= 2007 in art =

The year 2007 in art involved various significant events and new works.

== Events ==
- April - The Museo Alameda opens in San Antonio, Texas, U.S.A.
- 10 June – 21 November – 52nd Venice Biennale.
- October - Execution by Yue Minjun sells at Sotheby's in London for £2.9 million pounds (US $5.9 million - euro 4.2 million) making it most expensive artwork ever sold by a Chinese contemporary artist.
- 18 October – In New York City, the Salander-O'Reilly Galleries is forced into closure on the evening of the opening of a major Caravaggio exhibition, amidst scandal and lawsuits.
- 22 October – In Amersfoort (Netherlands) a fire at the Armando museum destroys 63 paintings from the permanent and loan collections.
- 2 November – Nightwatching, Peter Greenaway's film about Rembrandt, is released. It is the first film in Greenaway's series "Dutch Masters".
- 14 November – Sotheby's sells La Fuensanta by Julio Romero de Torres to a private collector.
- 20 December – The Pablo Picasso painting Portrait of Suzanne Bloch, together with Candido Portinari's O Lavrador de Café, is stolen from the São Paulo Museum of Art. It is recovered about three weeks later.

== Exhibitions ==
- 23 January - 13 May - "Martin Ramirez at the American Folk Art Museum in New York City
- 10 May–28 July - “Universal Language & the Avant-Garde: Viking Eggeling, Hans Richter, and Jonas Mekas” at the Maya Stendhal gallery in New York City
- 14 June-16 September - National Portrait Gallery, "BP Portrait Award 2007"
- 15 June until 26 August - Ken Heyman: Pop Portraits at the Albright-Knox Gallery in Buffalo, New York
- 23 June until 16 September - Hans Schabus: Deserted Conquest at SITE Santa Fe in Santa Fe, New Mexico
- September–December - Garden in Transit, a public art exhibit, is displayed on New York City taxis between September 2007 and December 2007

== Awards ==
- Archibald Prize – John Beard, Portrait of Janet Laurence
- Arts & Cultural Council for Greater Rochester Artist of the Year – Manuel Rivera-Ortiz
- Caldecott Medal – David Wiesner, Flotsam
- Turner Prize – Mark Wallinger, State Britain
- Venice Biennale – (June 10 - November 21)
  - Lion d'Or Golden Lion for Lifetime Achievement:Malick Sidibé (Mali)
  - Lion d'Or for Best Pavilion: Andreas Fogarasi (Hungary)
- Wynne prize – Philip Wolfhagen, Winter Nocturne IV

== Works ==
- Sanford Biggers - Blossom
- Ed Dwight – Statue of Martin Luther King Jr. (sculpture, Houston, Texas)
- Russ Faxon – Statue of John Stith Pemberton (sculpture, Atlanta)
- Valerie Hegarty - Fallen Bierstadt (after A Storm in the Rocky Mountains, Mt. Rosalie by Albert Bierstadt)
- David Hockney – Bigger Trees Near Warter
- Zhang Huan - Three Legged Buddha (sculpture)
- Maya Lin - Above and Below (sculpture, Indianapolis Museum of Art)
- John Ney Michel and Christopher Liberatos – Statue of William Moultrie (sculpture, Charleston, South Carolina)
- Stephen Kettle – Statue of Alan Turing (sculpture in slate, Bletchley Park, England)
- Jo Ractliffe – Roadside stall on the way to Viana (photograph)
- Ian Rank-Broadley – The Stretcher Bearers and The Gates (bronzes, Armed Forces Memorial, Staffordshire, England)
- Neo Rauch
  - Hunter's Room
  - Waiting for the Barbarians
- Allison Saar – "Swing Low" – Harriet Tubman Memorial (Harriet Tubman Plaza, Harlem, Manhattan, New York City)
- Tahir Salahov – Land of Fire
- Doris Salcedo – Shibboleth (installation at Tate Modern, London)
- Luke Sullivan – The Fourth Secret of Fatima (sculpture)
- James Turrell – Dividing the Light (installation at Pomona College, Claremont, California, United States)

== Deaths ==
=== January to March ===
- 8 January – Iwao Takamoto, Japanese American animator, television producer and film director (b.1925).
- 11 January – Bryan Pearce, English naïve painter (b.1929).
- 20 January – Dan Christensen, American abstract painter (b.1942).
- 4 February – Jules Olitski, American abstract painter, printmaker, and sculptor (b.1922).
- 6 February – Heinz Berggruen, German art collector
- 14 February – Emmett Williams, American poet and Fluxus artist (b.1925).
- 22 February
  - Lothar-Günther Buchheim, German author, painter, and art collector (b.1918).
  - Miriam Mone, Northern Irish fashion designer (b.1965; ovarian cancer).
- 2 March – Madi Phala, South African artist (b.1955).
- 6 March – Jean Baudrillard, French cultural theorist, sociologist, philosopher, political commentator, and photographer (b.1929).
- 16 March – Raymond Nasher, American art collector (b.1921).

=== April to June ===
- 7 April – Johnny Hart, American cartoonist (b.1931).
- 8 April – Sol LeWitt, American conceptual and minimalist artist (b.1928).
- 10 April – Salvatore Scarpitta, American sculptor (b.1919).
- 15 April – Brant Parker, American cartoonist (b.1920).
- 17 April – Kitty Carlisle Hart, American singer, actress, and New York State Council on the Arts member (b.1910).
- 3 May – Warja Honegger-Lavater, Swiss artist and illustrator (b.1913).
- 26 May – James Beck, American art historian (b.1930).
- 28 May – Jörg Immendorff, German painter, sculptor, stage designer and art professor (b.1945; ALS).
- 2 June – Jerry Wilkerson, American painter (b.1943).
- 17 June – Gianfranco Ferré, Italian fashion designer (b.1944).
- 22 June – Bernd Becher, German photographer (b.1931).
- 26 June – Liz Claiborne, Belgian-born American fashion designer and entrepreneur (b.1929).

=== July to September ===
- 7 July – John Szarkowski, American photographer, curator, historian, and critic (b.1925).
- 17 July – Jeremy Blake, American digital artist and painter (b.1971).
- 22 July – Aleksandr Tatarskiy, Russian animator, artist, and film director (b.1950).
- 9 August – Joe O'Donnell, American photographer (b.1922).
- 11 August – Maurice Boitel, French painter (b.1919).
- 12 August
  - Elizabeth Murray, American painter, printmaker, and draughtsman (b.1940).
  - Mike Wieringo, American comic book artist (b.1963).
- 17 August – Edward Avedisian, American abstract painter (b.1936).
- 24 September – Lenore Tawney, American fiber artist (b.1907).
- 25 September – André Emmerich, American gallerist.

=== October to December ===
- 5 October – Alexandra Boulat, French photographer (b.1962).
- 8 October – Constantine Andreou, Greek painter and sculptor (b.1917).
- 21 October
  - R. B. Kitaj, American-born English artist (b.1932).
  - Ileana Sonnabend, American art dealer and gallerist.
- 30 October – Norbert Lynton, British art historian and Professor of the History of Art (b.1927).
- 16 November – Paul Brach, American abstract painter, lecturer and educator (b.1924).
- 4 December
  - Norval Morrisseau, Aboriginal Canadian artist (b.1932).
  - Herman Rose 98, American painter (b.1909).
- 7 December - Noel Forster, British painter (b.1932)
- 14 December – Ismail Gulgee, Pakistani painter (b.1926).
- 31 December
  - Michael Goldberg, American abstract expressionist painter and teacher (b. 1924).
  - Ettore Sottsass, Italian architect and designer (b. 1917)

=== Undated ===
- Steven Campbell, Scottish figurative painter (b. 1953)
