= List of public art in Charleston, South Carolina =

This is a list of public art in Charleston, South Carolina, in the United States. This list applies only to works of public art on permanent display in an outdoor public space. For example, this does not include artworks in museums. Public art may include sculptures, statues, monuments, memorials, murals, and mosaics.

Image	Title / subject	Location and coordinates	Date	Artist / designer	Type	Material	Dimensions	Designation	Owner / administrator	Wikidata	Notes
More images	Confederate Defenders of Charleston	White Point Garden 32°46.165′N 79°55.743′W	October 20, 1932	Hermon Atkins MacNeil	Monument	Bronze; Granite					
	Denmark Vesey Monument	Hampton Park 32°48′01″N 79°57′18″W	February 15, 2014	Ed Dwight	Monument	Bronze; Granite					
	John C. Calhoun Monument	Marion Square 32°47′12″N 79°56′7″W	June 27, 1896	Daniel A. J. Sullivan	Monument						Removed in 2020 during the George Floyd protests.
	Statue of William Moultrie	White Point Garden 32°46′11″N 79°55′44″W	June 28, 2007	John Ney Michel; Christopher Liberatos	Statue						
More images	The Defenders of Fort Moultrie	White Point Garden 32°46′11″N 79°55′46″W	June 28, 1877		Monument						
