= Salakhov =

Salakhov or Salahov (Russian: Салахов) is an Asian masculine surname, its feminine counterpart is Salakhova or Salahova. The surname may refer to the following notable people:

- Aidan Salahova (born 1964), Russian and Azeri artist, daughter of Tahir
- Tahir Salahov (1928–2021), Soviet painter
  - House-Museum of Tahir Salahov
- Yevgeny Salakhov (born 1979), Russian sprint canoer
- Yuliana Salakhova (born 1984), Russian sprint canoer
