= Land of Fire =

Land of Fire may refer to:

- The Land of Fire, Azerbaijan's national motto
- Land of Fire (triptych), a monumental triptych by the Azerbaijani painter Tahir Salakhov
- The archipelago of Tierra del Fuego, sometimes translated as "Land of Fire" or "Fireland"
  - Isla Grande de Tierra del Fuego, the archipelago's main island
- Land of Fire, a nation in the fictional universe of Naruto

== See also ==
- Tierra del Fuego (disambiguation)
- Firelands
