= Museum of Sacred Relics =

Museum

- Azerbaijani: Müqəddəs Əmanətlər Muzeyi
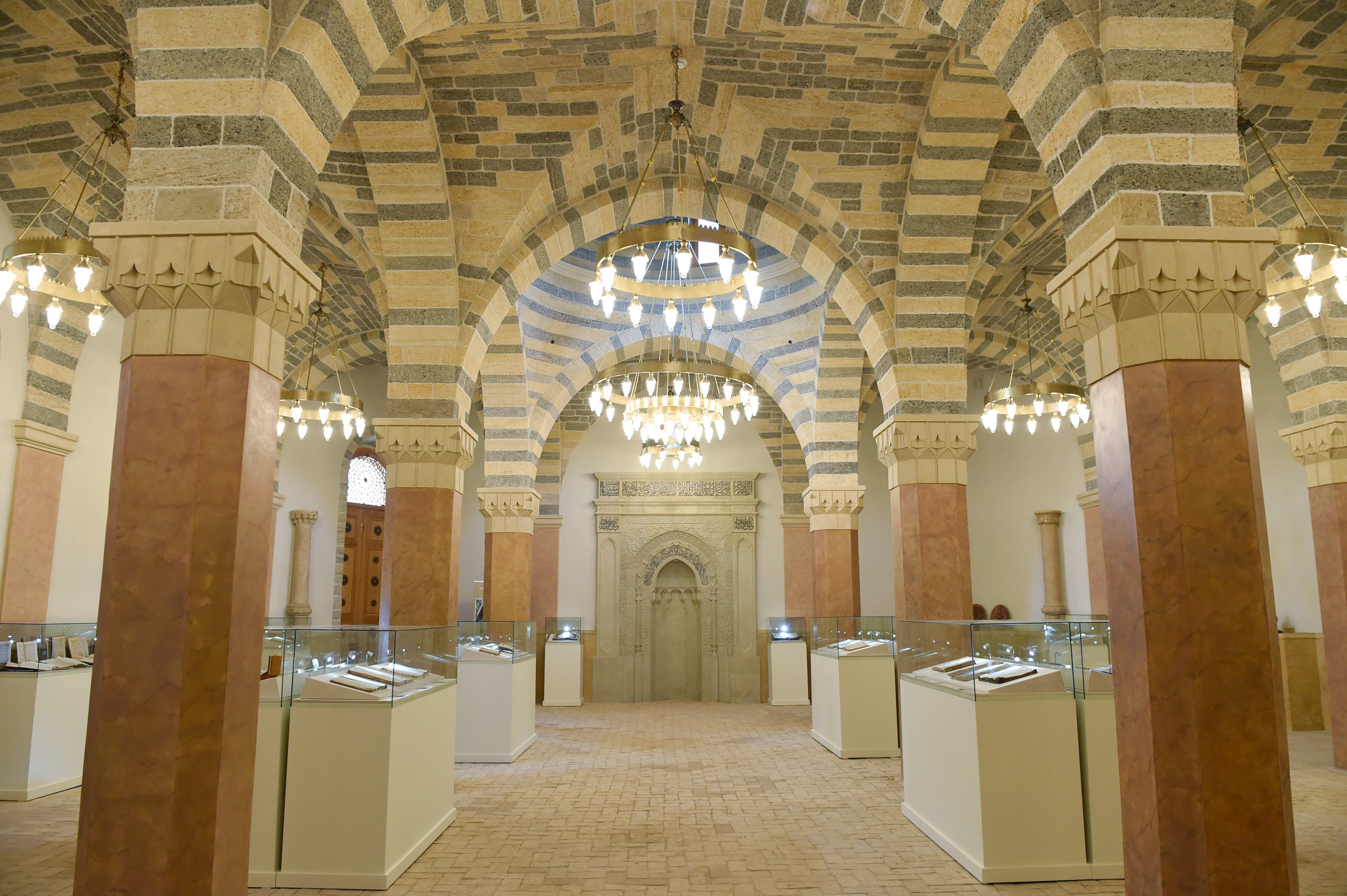

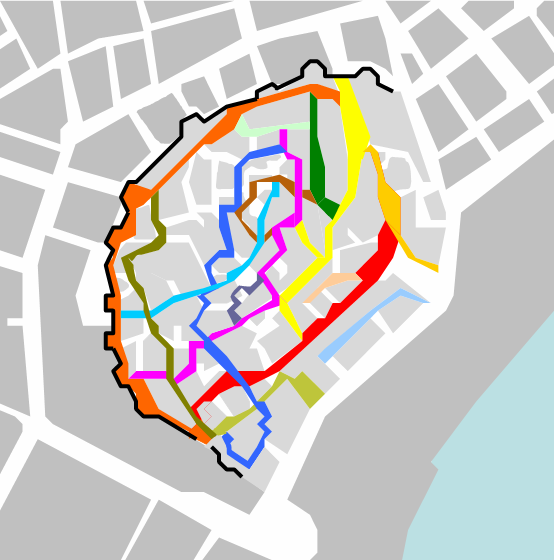
- Location in the Baku Old City
- Established: 2016
- Location: Inner City 47 Ilyas Efendiyev Str., Baku, Azerbaijan
- Coordinates: 40°21′58″N 49°50′04″E

The Museum of Sacred Relics (Azerbaijani: Müqəddəs Əmanətlər Muzeyi) is a museum located in the Beylar Mosque, in Icherisheher. The museum, which began to operate in the mosque after restoration and conservation, displays samples of the Koran, a sacred relic of the Islamic religion, old books from various times, as well as samples of applied art related to worship.

== Exhibition ==
The exhibition features ancient editions of Koran, a sacred relic of Islam, dating back to different times. It displays 73 editions of Koran, 7 religious books, 19 religious attributes—a total of 99 exhibits. Among those that attract attention are the pages of books saved from fire, walled up by the akhund in the wall and thus preserved the Koran, belonging to the Derbent mosque, as well as the sections of Koran presented there. The sacred relics, collected from various regions of Azerbaijan, found in libraries and private estates that were exposed to fire, were.

== History ==
The museum opened in 2016 after the restoration of the Beyler Mosque.

== See also ==
- House-Museum of Tahir Salahov
- Baku Museum of Miniature Books
- House-Museum of Vagif Mustafazadeh
