= Statue of William Moultrie =

Monumental statue in Charleston, South Carolina

Coordinates: 32°46′11″N 79°55′44″W

William Moultrie statue
- Location: White Point Garden, Charleston, South Carolina, United States
- Designer: John Ney Michel; Christopher Liberatos (pedestal)
- Fabricator: Ward Sculptural Arts Foundry
- Height: 15 feet (4.6 m)
- Dedicated date: June 28, 2007
- Dedicated to: William Moultrie

The William Moultrie statue is a monumental statue in Charleston, South Carolina, United States. Located in White Point Garden, the statue was unveiled in 2007 and honors William Moultrie, a general in the American Revolutionary War.

== History ==
William Moultrie was a general in the Continental Army during the American Revolutionary War. In 1776, he earned fame for his victory in the Battle of Fort Sullivan, one of the first American victories in the war. The fort would later be called Fort Moultrie in his honor. Following the war, he served multiple terms as Governor of South Carolina and published a memoir of his experiences in the war. He died in 1805.

There had been multiple attempts to erect a statue in honor of Moultrie, including in 1829, the early 1900s, and 1975, but none came to fruition. Starting in 1998, a descendant of Moultrie started another push to erect a statue in Moultrie's honor, and in 2000, a committee for the creation of such a statue was organized by members of the local chapters of the Society of the Cincinnati, the Society of Colonial Wars, and the Sons of the American Revolution. Over the next several years, the committee raised approximately $250,000 for the creation of a statue. Local sculptor John Ney Michel was hired to design the statue, while Christopher Liberatos designed the pedestal. Ward Sculptural Arts Foundry in Atlanta cast the statue. In April 2007, the capstan of the USS Maine was removed from its location in White Point Garden, which would serve as the location for the monument.

The dedication for the monument was held on June 28, 2007 (Carolina Day) in a ceremony that attracted several hundred. The ceremony had been planned around the Carolina Day celebrations, as often the annual celebrations are held around The Defenders of Fort Moultrie monument in White Point Garden. Former Bishop C. FitzSimons Allison of the Episcopal Diocese of South Carolina dedicated and blessed the monument, and five wreaths were laid at the base of the monument from five organizations responsible for erecting the monument. Both former Governor James B. Edwards and Mayor of Charleston Joseph P. Riley Jr. praised the monument, and further celebrations in honor of Moultrie were held later that day at nearby Fort Moultrie. The monument is located near the Confederate Defenders of Charleston monument in White Point Garden.

== Design ==
The monument consists of an 8-foot (2.4 m) statue of Moultrie atop a 9-foot (2.7 m) granite pedestal. The front of the pedestal bears the inscription "MOULTRIE", while the other three sides contain inscriptions of the names of the organizations responsible for the monument's creation and a brief biography of Moultrie's life. Beneath the biography is the date of the monument's dedication, "June 28, 2007". The statue faces Charleston Harbor and depicts Moultrie with his hat in his hand and his sword in his sheath.

== See also ==
- 2007 in art

== Bibliography ==
- Morgan, Hazel (March 21, 2018). "Monuments in Battery Park in Charleston". USA Today. Gannett.
- Slade, David (June 28, 2007). "Moultrie's statue unveiled amid pageantry, pomp". The Post and Courier. Evening Post Publishing Company.
- Young, John R. (2010). A Walk in the Parks: The Definitive Guidebook to Monuments in Charleston's Major Downtown Parks-- Including White Point Garden, Marion Square, Waterfront Park, and Washington Square. Evening Post Publishing Company. ISBN 978-0-9825154-4-0 – via Google Books.
