= To you, humanity! =

1961 painting by Tahir Salahov

- Azerbaijani: Sənə, bəşəriyyət!
- Artist: Tahir Salahov
- Year: 1961
- Dimensions: 180 cm × 594 cm (71 in × 234 in)
- Location: National Art Museum of Azerbaijan, Baku
- Website: nationalartmuseum.az

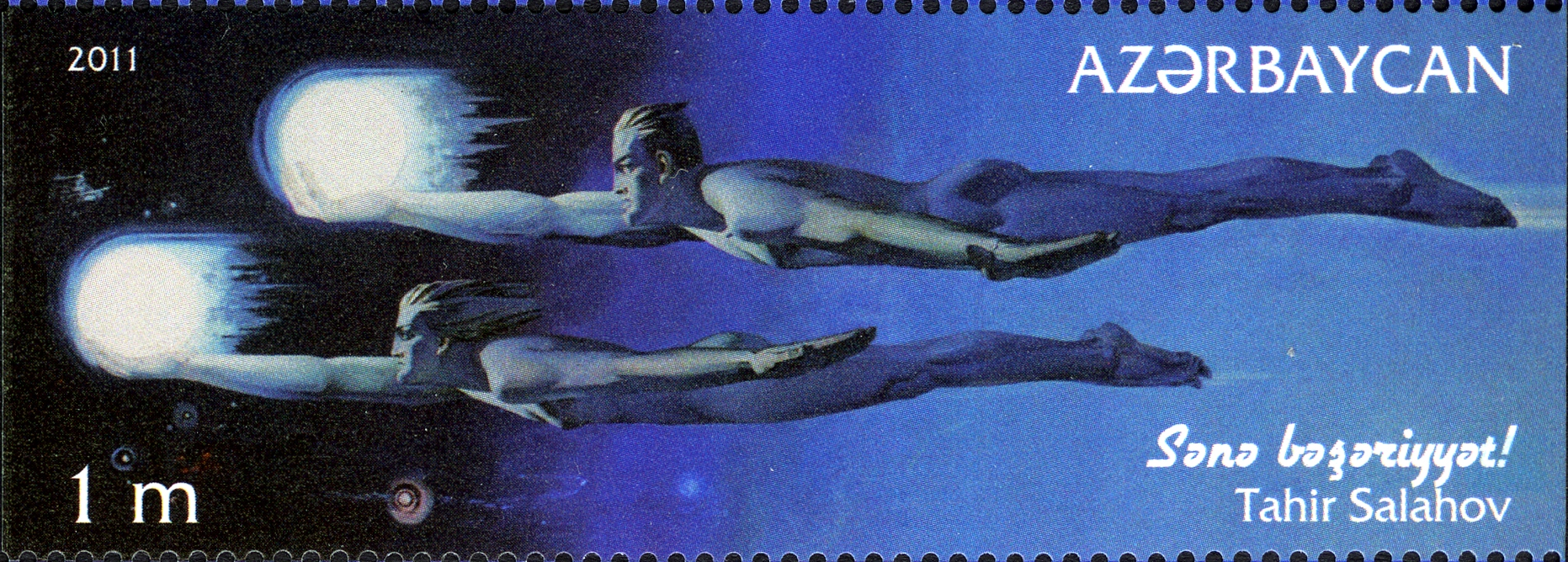
50th Anniversary of the First Manned Space Flight. Painting by Takhir Salakhov "For You, Humanity!" (1961), reproduced on the stamp of Azerbaijan in 2011 on the 50th anniversary of Yuri Gagarin's first flight into space.

"To you, humanity!" (Azerbaijani: Sənə, bəşəriyyət!) is a panel painting by the Azerbaijani painter Tahir Salahov, painted in 1961. It is kept in the National Museum of Arts, Baku. This painting is considered one of the most famous works of the artist.

== History ==
Since the huge canvas did not fit in Salahovs studio, the author painted the picture in the premises of a nearby school. According to Salahov himself, the painting was created not as an order, but "according to the inner, optimistic dictate of the soul". The paintings figures, the author, as noted by the art critic Nuraddin Habibov, sought to convey his admiration for the conquest of the space. In their palms can be seen like the first satellites.

The painting was first exhibited at the republican art exhibition in Baku on 12 April 1961. Literally on the same day, it became known about Yuri Gagarins flight into space. According to the artist, in the working process on this canvas, a foresight dawned on him, which, in his opinion, is symbolic.

Later the painting was regarded as deeply formalist. Despite the fact that rumors about this had already reached Salahov, he decided to send “To you, humanity!” to Moscow Manege to the reporting exhibition of the Union of Artists of the USSR, held in 1962. Before the opening day, the Ministry of Culture leadership traditionally walked around the Manege, examining the works and filming those they did not like. Tahir Salahov, fearing that his picture would be removed as a formalist one, without waiting for the commission, did it himself to avoid a scandal. Later, the first secretary of the board of the Union of Artists of the USSR, Sergei Gerasimov, thanked Salahov for “saving the state of our Union”. The work was sent back to Baku and has since been kept in the Museum of Art. Until 2008, no one saw the picture in Russia. A few people knew about it even in Azerbaijan.

In 2008, the painting was restored. On 9 December 2008, "To you, humanity" was exhibited in Moscow in the Aidan Gallery, at an exhibition dedicated to the 80th anniversary of Tahir Salahov. The exhibition was organized by the artists daughter Aidan Salahova. The reason why the picture was not known to the general public even in the Salahovs reproduction is seen in the large size of the canvas, due to which it was practically impossible to even photograph it effectively.

In 2008, the painting was presented at the Venice Biennale.

In January 2011, an exhibition of carpets woven by the Sumgait masters was held at the Glinka State Museum of Musical Culture in Moscow. On one of the carpets, the painting “To You, Humanity!” was reproduced.

On 12 April 2011, a series of postage stamps of Azerbaijan dedicated to the 50th anniversary of mans flight into space was issued. One of them depicted the painting "To you, humanity".
