= The Shift is Over =

1957 painting by Tahir Salahov

- Azerbaijani: Növbədən qayıdanlar
- Artist: Tahir Salahov
- Year: 1957
- Medium: Oil on canvas
- Movement: Severe style
- Dimensions: 165 cm × 368 cm
- Location: Scientific-research Museum of the Russian Academy of Arts, Saint Petersburg (original)
- Website: https://collection.artsacademymuseum.org/

The Shift is Over (Azerbaijani: Növbədən qayıdanlar) is a 1957 oil-on-canvas painting by Azerbaijani artist Tahir Salahov, a prominent figure in Soviet art and a pioneer of the Severe Style movement. Measuring 165 × 368 cm, the work is considered a landmark of 20th-century Socialist realism for its stark portrayal of industrial labor, deviating from the era's mandated artistic optimism.

== Description and historical context ==
The painting depicts a group of oil workers trudging along a pier after completing their shift at Oil Rocks (Neft Daşları), a Soviet offshore industrial settlement in the Caspian Sea. Rendered in muted grays, browns, and blacks, the workers appear exhausted and weather-beaten, their faces marked by the physical toll of labor. Salahov's signature use of red accents—visible in a worker's scarf and industrial machinery—injects tension into the otherwise somber palette. The backdrop features turbulent waves and seagulls, symbolizing the harsh natural environment surrounding the man-made structures.

Salahov created the work as his graduation project at Moscow's Surikov Art Institute, drawing inspiration from his visits to Oil Rocks, the USSR's first offshore oil platform. Constructed on wooden piers in the late 1940s, the site symbolized Soviet industrial progress but also exposed workers to isolation and peril. Personal experiences deeply influenced Salahov's approach: his father, Teymur Salahov, was executed during Stalin's Great Purge in 1938, an event that fueled his skepticism toward state-mandated artistic optimism.

== Artistic style and legacy ==
The Shift is Over exemplifies the Severe Style, a movement characterized by restrained color palettes, emotional depth, and a focus on individual humanity over collective heroism. While influenced by Soviet artists like Aleksandr Deineka and Pavel Korin, Salahov diverged by emphasizing the dignity and fatigue of laborers. His use of red accents has been interpreted as both a nod to Soviet symbolism and a subtle critique of its ideological constraints.

Initially criticized by Soviet authorities for its perceived pessimism, the painting gained acclaim for its unvarnished depiction of working-class life. Art historian Sergey Gerasimov later praised its authenticity, calling it a "truthful mirror of its era." It debuted at the 1957 Moscow All-Union Art Exhibition and toured internationally, including exhibitions in Vienna and Beijing. Today, the work is celebrated as a cultural landmark in Azerbaijan and a pivotal example of post-Stalinist art. In 2012, Salahov donated a collection of his works, including preparatory sketches related to the painting, to Azerbaijan's national archives, underscoring its enduring significance.
