= Statue of John Stith Pemberton =

Monument in Atlanta, Georgia, U.S.

John Stith Pemberton statue
- John Stith Pemberton statue (2020)
- Interactive map of John Stith Pemberton statue
- Coordinates: 33.7627°N 84.3935°W
- Designer: Russ Faxon
- Material: Bronze
- Height: 6 feet 4 inches (1.93 m)
- Weight: 800 pounds (360 kg)
- Dedicated date: 2007
- Dedicated to: John Stith Pemberton

The John Stith Pemberton statue is a public statue in Atlanta, Georgia, United States. Located in Pemberton Place, near the World of Coca-Cola, the statue is of John Stith Pemberton, the inventor of Coca-Cola.

== History ==
John Stith Pemberton, a pharmacist in Atlanta, invented Coca-Cola in 1886. He sold the formula two years later to Asa Griggs Candler, who shortly thereafter founded The Coca-Cola Company. In 2007, the company opened a new museum in downtown Atlanta called the World of Coca-Cola. That same year, the statue of Pemberton was unveiled outside the museum, in an area called Pemberton Place, named in his honor. The statue was designed by artist Russ Faxon.

== Design ==
The bronze statue weighs 800 pounds (360 kg), with Pemberton standing 6 feet 4 inches (1.93 m) tall. His left hand is resting on a table while he lifts up a glass of Coca-Cola with his right hand.

== See also ==
- 2007 in art
