= Land of Fire (triptych) =

Triptych by Tahir Salahov

The "Land of Fires" (Azerbaijani: Odlar yurdu) is a monumental triptych by the Azerbaijani painter Tahir Salakhov, created in 2007. This work, one of the artists later works, crowns a cycle of paintings dedicated to the oil workers life and work in Azerbaijan.

== Description ==
In the central part of the triptych, called the "Caspian today", there is an image of an offshore oil platform with a burning torch of associated gas and boats sailing up to it. In the left part, called the "Temple of Fire Worshipers" - Ateshgah, with burning torches and fire worshipers, and in the right - a large group of people praying around the Maiden Tower, representing a huge burning torch.

== Criticism ==
As the art historian and critic Ekaterina Degot notes, this triptych interprets oil “not in an industrial, but rather a religious sense”:

The oil no longer burns with restraint, in the hearts of people, but openly, on the top of the towers and in the altars of temples (of mysterious ancient fire worshipers). And people stand in ritual poses, in the stiffness of which the inner freedom is no longer felt. Rather, the dependence on this - perhaps, of not so eternal - fire.

== See also ==
- To you, humanity!
