= Portrait of the composer Gara Garayev =

Painting by Tahir Salahov

- Azerbaijani: Bəstəkar Qara Qarayevin portreti
- Artist: Tahir Salahov
- Year: 1960
- Dimensions: 121 cm × 203 cm (48 in × 80 in)
- Location: Tretyakov Gallery, Moscow
- Website: tretyakovgallery.ru

The "Portrait of the composer Gara Garayev" (Azerbaijani: Bəstəkar Qara Qarayevin portreti) is a painting by the Azerbaijani painter, People's Artist of the USSR, Tahir Salahov, in 1960, stored in Moscow, in the State Tretyakov Gallery. It depicts the famous Azerbaijani composer, People's Artist of the USSR, Hero of the Socialist Labour, Gara Garayev.

For the "Portrait of the composer Gara Garayev", in 1962, Salahov was awarded the silver medal of the USSR Academy of Arts, and in 1968 - the USSR State Prize.

The portrait depicts the composer Gara Garayev sitting, grouped as for a tiger's jump, writes the art critic Ekaterina Degot. He is wearing a turtleneck and something like the Soviet equivalent of jeans. It is a realistic portrait painted entirely from life. Gara Garayev sits on something like a hard stool. As Degot notes that it is difficult for Garaev, he is working in front of our eyes. He works while sitting. He does not drum on the piano keys in a state of ecstasy, but thinks intensely, and books are on the piano. He is not a “creator”, but a kind of a conscious “operator” of his own creation, like an operator of the Electronic Computing Machines (then a fashionable profession) or even like an oil rig repairman (who, we note, does not repair anything in Salahov's work, but rather strategically plans a renovation). His work has an intellectual and technical component”.

According to Degot, for the Soviet Union of the first post-Stalinist years, such an image of people was a revolutionary idea, since it rehabilitated the intelligentsia with all its almost inevitable (then) cosmopolitanism embodied in every (then) clear symbol - the defiant white turtleneck of Gara Garayev (that Salahov himself forced him put it on).
