= Confederate Defenders of Charleston =

Monument in Charleston, South Carolina

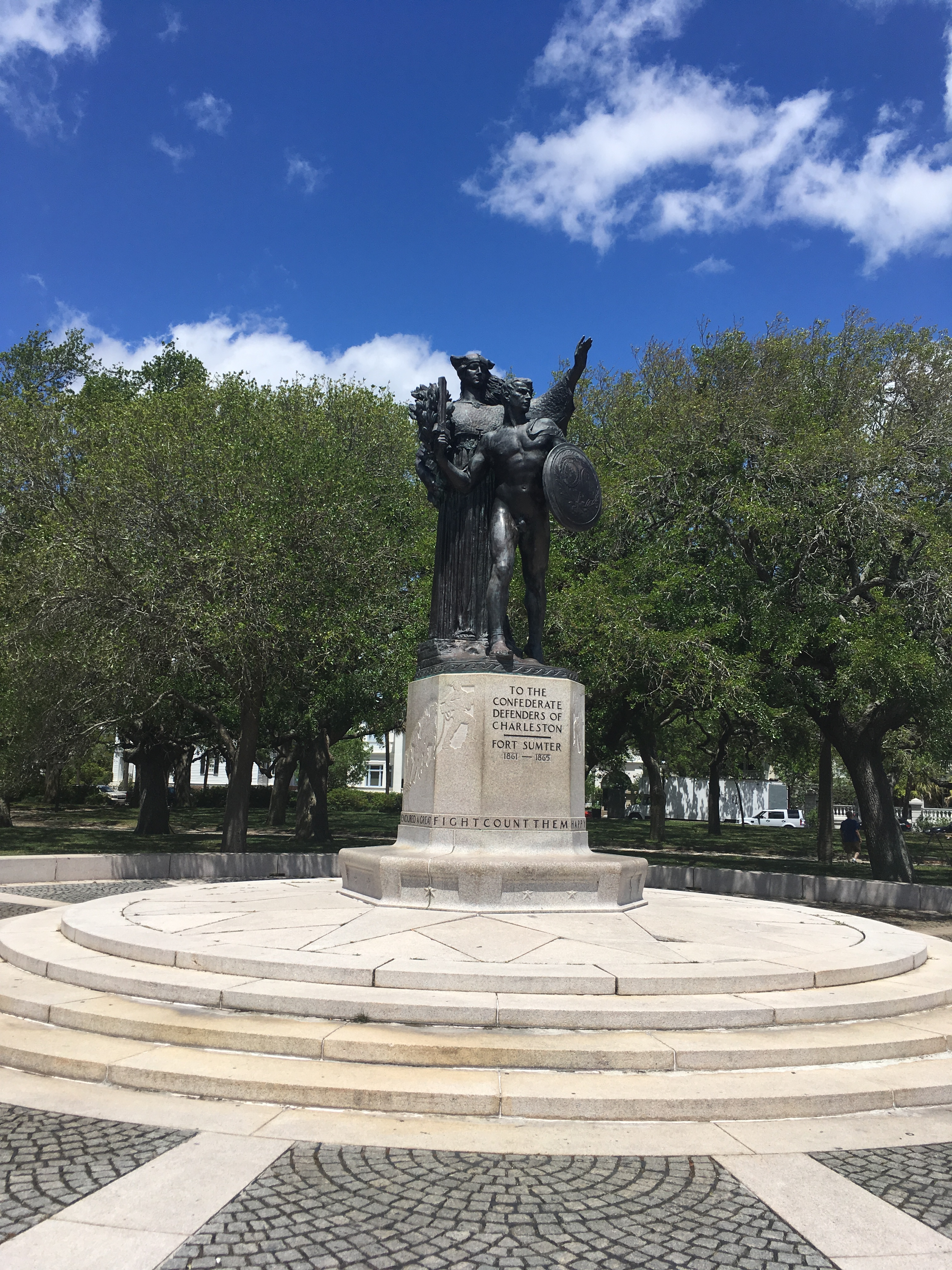
- Confederate Defenders of Charleston (2018)
- Interactive map of Confederate Defenders of Charleston
- Location: White Point Garden, Charleston, South Carolina
- Coordinates: 32°46.165′N 79°55.743′W
- Designer: Hermon Atkins MacNeil
- Fabricator: Delano & Aldrich; Rudier Foundry
- Material: Bronze; Granite
- Height: 17 feet (5.2 m)
- Dedicated date: October 20, 1932
- Dedicated to: Confederate soldiers from Charleston

Confederate Defenders of Charleston is a monument in Charleston, South Carolina, United States. The monument honors Confederate soldiers from Charleston, most notably those who served at Fort Sumter during the American Civil War. Built with funds provided by a local philanthropist, the monument was designed by Hermon Atkins MacNeil and was dedicated in White Point Garden in 1932. The monument, standing 17 feet (5.2 m) tall, features two bronze statues of a sword and shield-bearing defender standing in front of a symbolic representation of the city of Charleston. In recent years, the monument has been the subject of vandalism and calls for removal as part of a larger series of removal of Confederate monuments and memorials in the United States.

== History ==
=== Background and dedication ===
In April 1861, Fort Sumter, a sea fort held by the Union Army near Charleston, South Carolina, was besieged by Confederate forces, who would later take control of the fortification and hold it throughout the American Civil War until February 1865, the same year the war ended. The idea for a monument honoring the Confederate soldiers from Charleston, and in particular those at Fort Sumter, gained traction in the early 1900s. In 1928, Andrew Buist Murray, a notable philanthropist from Charleston, died and left $100,000 in his will for the purposes of erecting a monument of this nature. The local chapter of the United Daughters of the Confederacy was responsible for the monument's erection. Hermon Atkins MacNeil was chosen as the designer for the monument, and New York City-based Delano & Aldrich served as the architectural firm. Additionally, casting for some parts of the monument was performed by the Rudier Foundry in Paris. In designing the monument, MacNeil wished to portray the defenders of Charleston as "stalwart youth" defending both the fort and the city, where the defenders' wife and family, their "most prized possessions", lived. The total cost for the monument was between $80,000 and $90,000. Dedication for the monument, which was located in Charleston's White Point Garden, took place on October 20, 1932. Burnet R. Maybank, the Mayor of Charleston, declared the day a public holiday to allow municipal employees to attend the ceremony.

The dedication ceremony, attracting approximately 8,000 attendees, was presided over by several notable individuals from the region. Bishop Albert Sidney Thomas of the Episcopal Diocese of South Carolina gave the invocation, while Bishop Emmet M. Walsh of the Roman Catholic Diocese of Charleston gave the benediction. The keynote speaker for the ceremony was Gerald W. Johnson, a writer for The Evening Sun newspaper in Baltimore. In his speech, Johnson argued that the men honored in the monument had not fought to preserve slavery in the United States, but instead had fought for "their right to live their lives as they chose to live them." Several Confederate veterans were present, while a group of four women who were all descendants of Confederate garrison members from Fort Sumter performed the official unveiling for the monument. Following the unveiling, a Confederate flag, said to be the last one to fly over Fort Sumter, was placed at the base of the monument along with two wreaths made of white and red carnations.

The monument was dedicated during a period known as the Charleston Renaissance, a period of growth for the city that saw, among other things, a boom in the arts and in historic preservation efforts that promoted tourism in Charleston. Boosters promoted the city's history as rooted in Southern culture, and numerous monuments honoring Charleston's history, such as the Defenders monument, were erected during this time. According to historian Robert J. Cook, "The Lost Cause flourished amid these changes," and he points to Johnson's keynote speech during the monument's dedication as an example of this. A 2019 article in The Charleston Chronicle discussing monuments in the area describes the year of the monument's dedication as "the apex of the Ku Klux Klan".

=== Recent controversy ===
In recent years, the monument has come under increased criticism and has been the subject of vandalism and calls for removal. In 2004, the monument was vandalized when someone spray-painted "genocidal" and "Kill Whitey" across it. Shortly after the Charleston church shooting in 2015, the monument, along with the John C. Calhoun Monument in Charleston's Marion Square, was defaced. The Defenders monument was graffitied with the phrases "Black lives matter" and "This is the problem #racist". In July of that year, in response to the shooting, the Confederate battle flag was removed from the grounds of the South Carolina State House in Columbia, South Carolina. Following this, the Defenders monument became the site of demonstrations by flaggers, which, as of 2020, have been held every Sunday since then.

Following the Unite the Right rally in 2017, the NAACP and the National Action Network (NAN) called on the government of South Carolina to repeal a law that barred the removal of public monuments and memorials, including Confederate monuments. On August 13, a day after the Charlottesville car attack during the Unite the Right rally, NAN held a rally at the Defenders monument. On August 16, 2017, another rally in Charleston calling for the removal of the Calhoun and Defenders monuments was attended by about 100 people. The event was organized by the local chapter of the Democratic Socialists of America, who also called for a repeal of the act barring the monuments' removals. In response, Charleston Mayor John Tecklenburg announced plans to "add context" to several monuments in the city (including the Defenders monument) with the installation of plaques that provide additional information on the monuments and their backgrounds. In June 2019, the monument was vandalized again, with a "red paint like substance" splattered onto the monument. Two individuals were later arrested for the act.

On May 30, 2020, as part of the George Floyd protests in the United States, the statue was again vandalized, with "traitors" and "BLM" spray-painted on the pedestal. The statue itself was later covered. For about a month following this, the Defenders monument became the primary site of protests against Confederate monuments and symbolism in the city. A protest on June 7 attracted approximately 150 protestors, while about 50 protestors attended one a week later that also recognized the five-year anniversary of the Charleston church shooting. Later that month, the Calhoun monument was removed by the city. Throughout July, the Defenders monument was the site of dueling protests between opponents of the monument, including Black Lives Matter activists, and flaggers. On July 9, two men were arrested during one such protest for assault and battery, while at another protest on July 12, members of the Light Foot Militia, a militia organization, organized in support of the flaggers. At a protest in September, a man was arrested for brandishing a rifle.

== Design ==
The monument consists of a bronze statue of two figures atop a granite pedestal. The figure in front is a warrior, symbolizing the Confederate soldiers from Charleston, wearing only a fig leaf and sandals and holding both a sword and a shield bearing the Seal of South Carolina. Behind him stands a female figure symbolizing Charleston. Described as resembling an Amazon or an "Athena-like" figure, she holds a laurel wreath as a reward for the warrior. These statues stand 10 feet 6 inches (3.20 m) tall atop an octagonal pedestal that rises 6 feet 6 inches (1.98 m). The monument lies at the center of a large circular plaza with a diameter of 56.5 feet (17.2 m).

The monument features several inscriptions on the pedestal. On the front is inscribed:

TO THE
CONFEDERATE
DEFENDERS OF
CHARLESTON
FORT SUMTER
1861–1865

Below this, the following inscription wraps around the pedestal:

COUNT THEM HAPPY WHO FOR THEIR FAITH AND THEIR COURAGE ENDURED A GREAT FIGHT.

== See also ==
- 1932 in art
- List of Confederate monuments and memorials in South Carolina

== Bibliography ==
- Behre, Robert (August 15, 2017a). "NAACP, NAN call for South Carolina to repeal Heritage Act blocking removal of Confederate monuments". The Post and Courier. Evening Post Industries. Archived from the original on October 20, 2020.
- Behre, Robert (August 17, 2017b). "Charleston looks at amending — not removing — its Confederate-era monuments". The Post and Courier. Evening Post Industries. Archived from the original on October 17, 2020.
- "Charleston removing statue of staunch slavery advocate John C. Calhoun". CBS News. CBS. Associated Press. June 24, 2020. Archived from the original on October 29, 2020.
- Coello, Sara (May 30, 2020a). "Protesters march in Charleston against George Floyd's killing". The Post and Courier. Evening Post Industries. Archived from the original on July 30, 2020.
- Coello, Sara (July 9, 2020b). "2 more arrested after fight between protesters at Charleston Battery". The Post and Courier. Evening Post Industries. Archived from the original on September 12, 2020.
- Cook, Robert J. (2017). Civil War Memories: Contesting the Past in the United States Since 1865. Johns Hopkins University Press. ISBN 978-1-4214-2349-4 – via Google Books.
- Feit, Noah (June 16, 2019). "Confederate monument splashed with paint-like substance, SC cops say, and 2 arrested". The State. McClatchy. Archived from the original on October 15, 2020.
- Fortier-Bensen, Tony (May 30, 2020a). "Confederate Defenders statue spray-painted, later covered up after protests". WCIV. Archived from the original on October 15, 2020.
- Fortier-Bensen, Tony (July 26, 2020b). "Unified activist groups against Confederacy give list of demands for Charleston leaders". WCIV. Archived from the original on September 22, 2020.
- Frazier, Herb; Powers, Bernard Edward Jr.; Wentworth, Marjory (2016). We Are Charleston: Tragedy and Triumph at Mother Emanuel. W Publishing. ISBN 978-0-7180-4149-6 – via Google Books.
- Hensley, Nicole (June 22, 2015). "Bronze statue honoring Confederate soldiers defaced at Charleston, S.C., park". New York Daily News. Archived from the original on October 1, 2018.
- Holcombe, Madeline (June 24, 2020). "Charleston removes a statue of slavery defender and former Vice President John C. Calhoun". CNN. Archived from the original on October 31, 2020.
- Kyttle, Ethan J.; Roberts, Blain (June 25, 2015). "Take Down the Confederate Flags, but Not the Monuments". The Atlantic. Archived from the original on October 21, 2020.
- Majchrowicz, Michael (June 16, 2019). "Charleston police say Confederate monument downtown vandalized". The Post and Courier. Evening Post Industries. Archived from the original on November 7, 2020.
- Marchant, Bristow (July 10, 2018). "3 years later, Confederate flag casts shadow again over SC State House". The State. McClatchy. Archived from the original on October 14, 2020.
- Mathes, Michael (October 19, 2020). "Legacy of racism touches election, everyday life in US South". Yahoo! News. Agence France-Presse. Archived from the original on October 22, 2020.
- O'Brien, Abbey (July 12, 2020). "Black Lives Matter activists protest Confederate monument in downtown Charleston". WBTV. Archived from the original on October 21, 2020.
- Porter, Mikaela; Slade, David (June 7, 2020). "Groups face off at the Battery in Charleston as Sunday demonstrations get going". The Post and Courier. Evening Post Industries. Archived from the original on October 3, 2020.
- Rosen, Robert N. (1994). Confederate Charleston: An Illustrated History of the City and the People During the Civil War. University of South Carolina Press. ISBN 978-0-87249-991-1 – via Google Books.
- Smith, Fleming (June 14, 2020a). "Dozens protest at Charleston Battery to honor victims of Mother Emanuel AME shooting". The Post and Courier. Evening Post Industries. Archived from the original on September 20, 2020.
- Smith, Fleming (July 26, 2020b). "Activists demand stop to Confederate displays at Charleston Battery, criticize enforcement". The Post and Courier. Evening Post Industries. Archived from the original on October 3, 2020.
- Smith, Fleming (September 20, 2020c). "Lexington man arrested for brandishing weapon at Charleston Battery protest". The Post and Courier. Evening Post Industries. Archived from the original on October 5, 2020.
- Squires, Camille (June 12, 2020). "All the monuments to racism that have been torched, occupied, or removed". Mother Jones. Foundation for National Progress. Archived from the original on October 8, 2020.
- "Tragedy in Charlottesville: It is Time to Unite the "Right"". The Charleston Chronicle. August 16, 2017. Archived from the original on October 22, 2018.
- "Charleston's Landscape of Memory: The Gentrification of History". The Charleston Chronicle. February 23, 2018. Archived from the original on June 18, 2018.
- "The Danger of Forgetting History". The Charleston Chronicle. May 3, 2019. Archived from the original on May 13, 2019.
- "Protesters in Some Cities Target Confederate Monuments". U.S. News & World Report. Associated Press. May 31, 2020. Archived from the original on June 20, 2020.
- Yee, Gregory; Brunson, Brooks (August 16, 2017). "'Take it down': Charleston activists hold rally, call for removal of Confederate-era monuments". The Post and Courier. Evening Post Industries. Archived from the original on January 27, 2019.
- Young, John R. (2010). A Walk in the Parks: The Definitive Guidebook to Monuments in Charleston's Major Downtown Parks-- Including White Point Garden, Marion Square, Waterfront Park, and Washington Square. Evening Post Publishing Company. ISBN 978-0-9825154-4-0 – via Google Books.
