= Baku Museum of Miniature Books =

Museum in Baku, Azerbaijan

- Miniatür Kitab Muzeyi
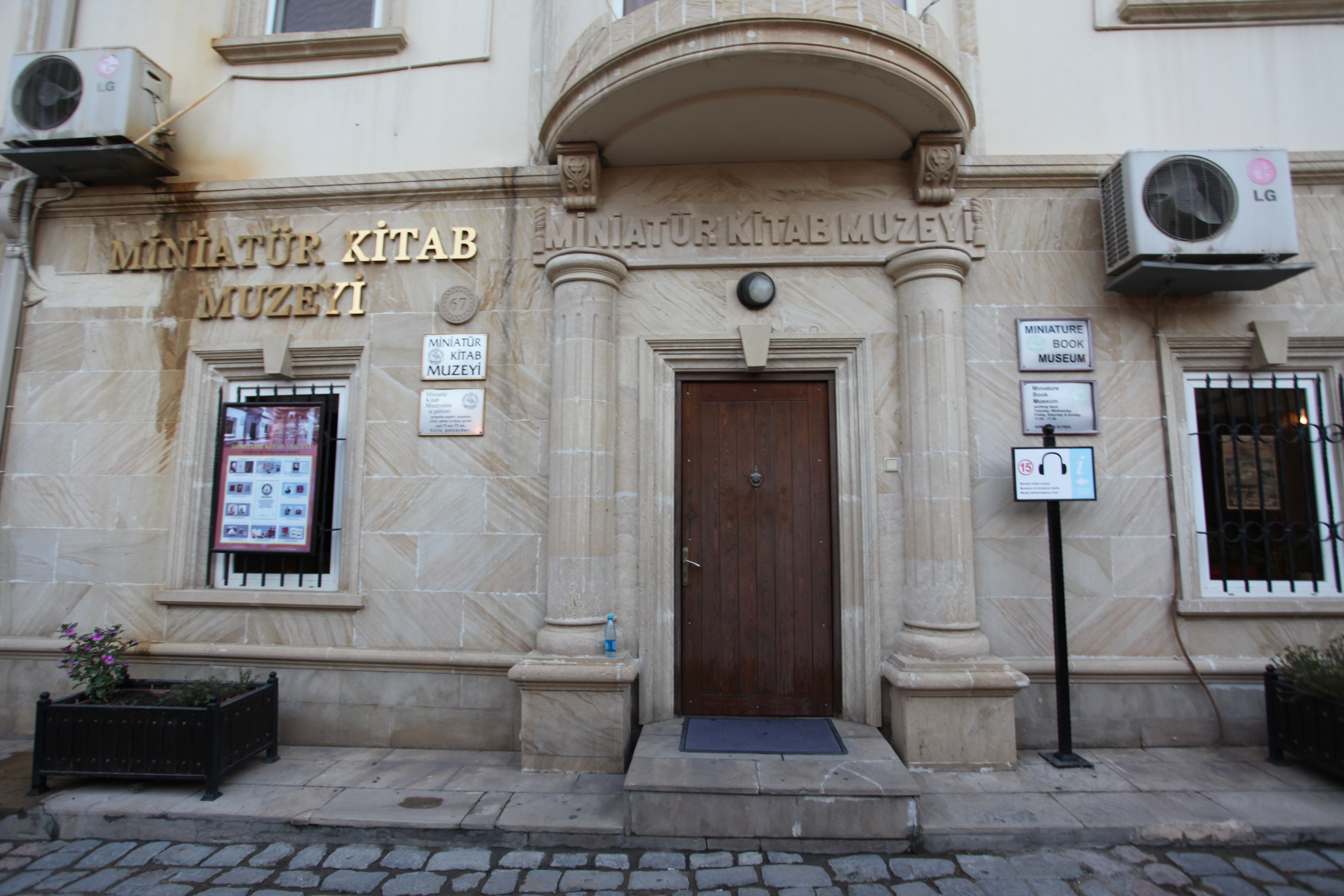
- Established: 23 April 2002; 24 years ago
- Location: Inner City No. 1/67, Baku, Azerbaijan
- Coordinates: 40°21′59″N 49°49′57″E
- Type: Art and literary museum
- Collection size: 5,600
- Founder: Zarifa Salahova
- Director: Zarifa Salahova
- Website: minibooks.az/en

The Baku Museum of Miniature Books is the only museum of miniature books in the world, settled in the old part of Baku, called Inner City. The museum opened on 2 April 2002. In 2015, the Museum of Miniature Books was presented the Certificate of the Guinness Book of Records as the largest private museum of miniature books.

== Founding ==
The museum was founded by Zarifa Salahova, the sister of Tahir Salahov. Salahova decided to begin collecting miniature books in 1982, when she bought a miniature book of fables by Ivan Krylov in Moscow. She spent the next 30 years collecting miniature books, and this eventually culminated in the establishment of the museum, which officially opened on World Book Day, 23 April 2002. It was opened to public viewing with the hope of promoting childhood literacy.

== Collection ==
The collection consists of more than 6,500 books from 64 countries. It contains miniature books published in post-revolutionary Russia and in the Soviet period.

There are books in the exposition from several countries, including Moldavia, Georgia, Ukraine, Belarus and from the republics of Middle Asia and Europe. There are many rare editions, including those of Chukovsky, Barto, Gogol, Dostoyevsky, A.S. Pushkin, and Rabindranath Tagore. Miniature books of famous Azerbaijani classics, such as Vagif, Khurshidbanu Natavan, Nizami Ganjavi, Nasimi, Fizuli, Samed Vurgun, Mirza Fatali Akhundov and others are exhibited in the museum.

Other notable miniatures in this collection include a 17th-century copy of the Quran, a 13th-century book published by Peter Schöffer (successor to Johannes Gutenberg), and an 1841 edition of the entire works of Shakespeare.

Visitors can also see rare ancient religious books in the museum, aged over 100 years. The most ancient book is the Qur'an which was published in Saudi Arabia in 1672. Furthermore, there is a miniature book which consists of the songs of the Beatles. New publications are regularly added to the collection in the museum.

The museum consists of 15 sections, including "International", "Baltic countries", "Smallest", "Azerbaijani authors", "Soviet era", "Oldest", "Children's", "Pushkin", "Central Asia", and others. There are 25 glass exhibition cases in the museum.

Most of the books in the Azerbaijan section are about the country's present and former presidents. There are also miniature books dedicated to the life of former USA president Barack Obama and Turkish nationalist leader Mustafa Kemal Atatürk.

This category also includes the books about the visits of heads of different states to Azerbaijan. As well as miniature books for children in Azerbaijani language are also exhibited in the museum. The museum also has a separate section on Russian literature.

The category of Pushkin, one of the most well known Russian poets who lived in the 19th century, includes 320 books about him and his works. The most famous of them are Eugene Onegin (1837), The Queen of Spades, Stories of Belkin, and The biography of my Lermontov, as well as a very small book of poems by Pushkin dedicated to Moscow.

Some books in the collection were purchased, while others were donated. In 2016, the Princess of Thailand donated 38 books to the museum, according to Salahova.

== Sizes of the books ==
The museum has several thousands of fairy-sized books: macro-mini, miniature, micro-mini, and ultra-mini micro.

The four smallest books in the collection are all published by Toppan Publishing House in Tokyo. One measures 0.75 mm × 0.75 mm (0.030 in × 0.030 in). The other three, titled The language of flowers, Birthstone, and The signs of the Zodiac, measure 2 mm × 2 mm (0.079 in × 0.079 in) and were published in 1978. These books are so small that they can only be read with the use of a magnifying glass.

"The most miraculous thing" is the only book in the museum that falls into the size category of 6 mm × 6 mm (0.24 in × 0.24 in) to 6 mm × 9 mm (0.24 in × 0.35 in). The book was published in Moscow in 1985 and contains works by Máxim Gorki and Pushkin. It has been translated into 4 languages: Italian, German, French and English.

== Locations ==
The museum's original location is in Inner City, Baku, near the Shirvanshah Palace.

The museum has 3 branches, each of which began their activities on Salahova's the personal initiative. They are located in Shaki, Nakhchivan and Ganja.

On December 18, 2014, the museum opened the Nakhchivan branch. The branch is named after Azerbaijani writer Mammad Said Ordubadi and includes 1000 books originally brought from Baku.

The museum opened the branch in Ganja on May 21, 2016. It contains more than 1,045 copies of miniature books published in various countries. The exposition also includes books in Russian, Turkish, English, German, Arabic, Georgian and other languages.

In 2017, the museum opened its Shaki branch. There are 620 miniature books published in 26 countries in 6 showcases.

== Exhibitions ==
The miniature books of the museum were exhibited in Kabul (1988), in Istanbul (1991), Haifa (1994), in China (1995), in Moscow (1997 and 2003), in Kyiv and Sydney (2000), in Mainz (2003), in Ankara (2005), in Paris (1999 and 2006), in Saudi Arabia (2007), in London and Minsk (2009), in Shanghai (2010), and in Beijing and Havana (2011).

== Gallery ==
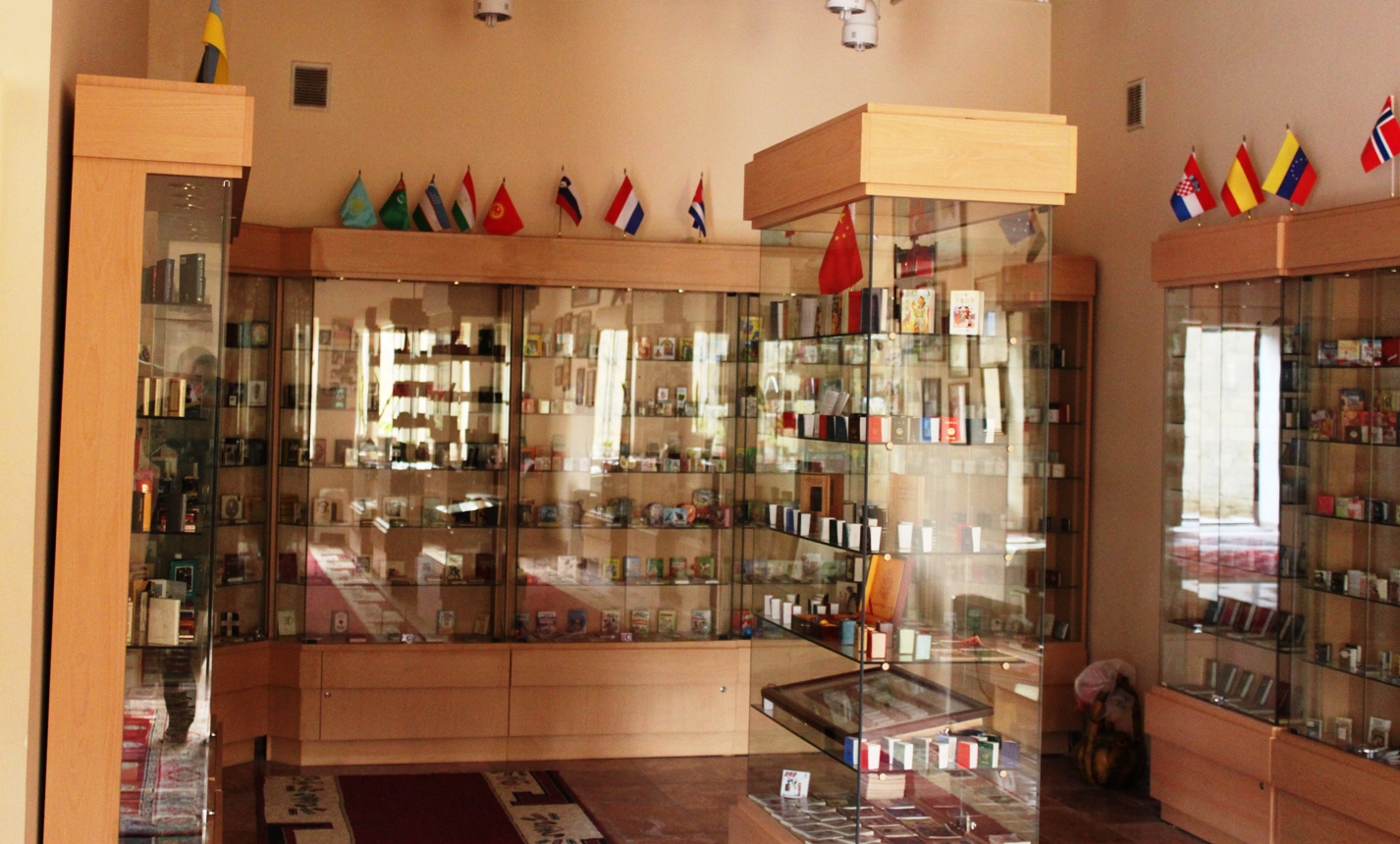

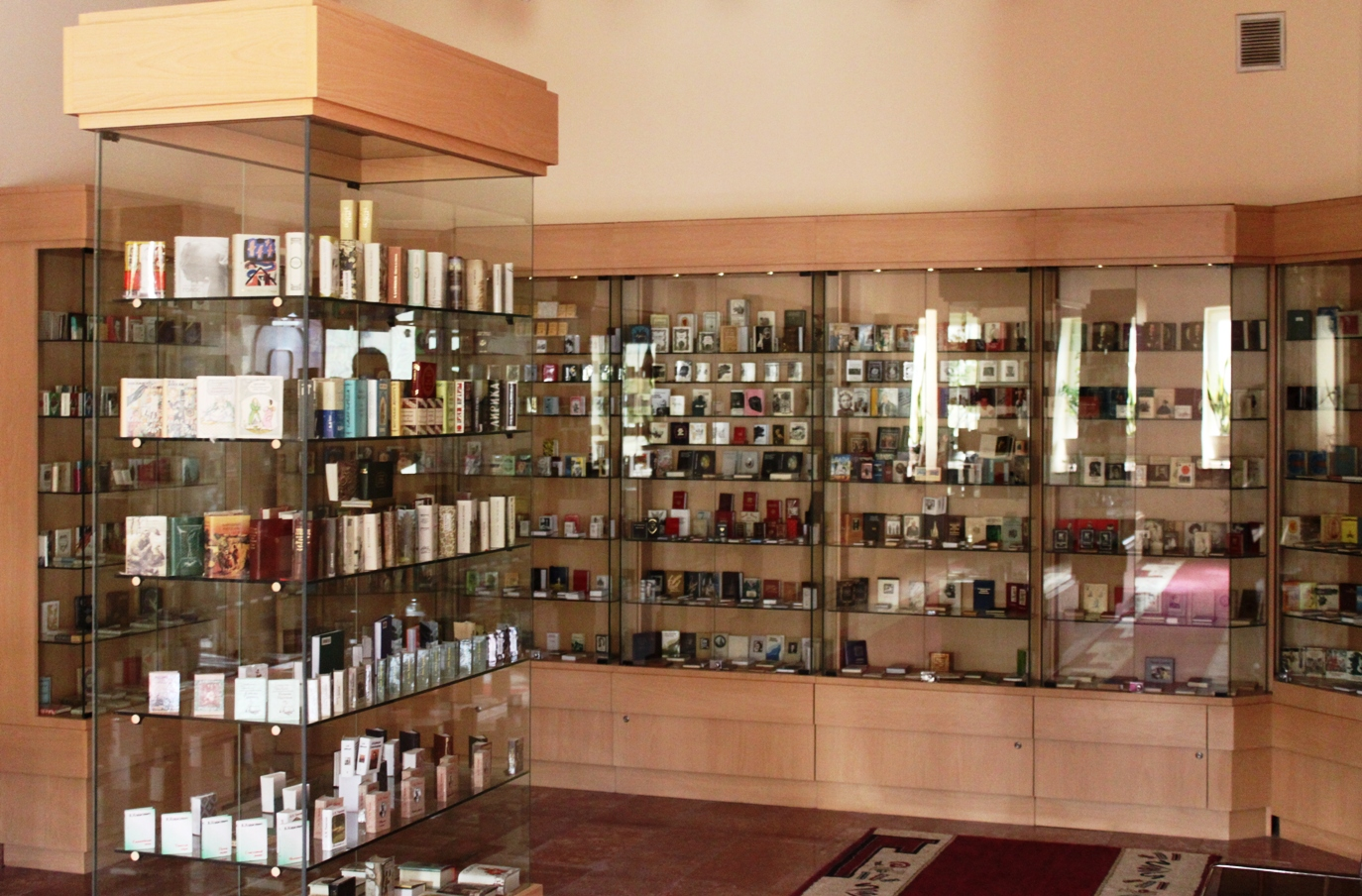

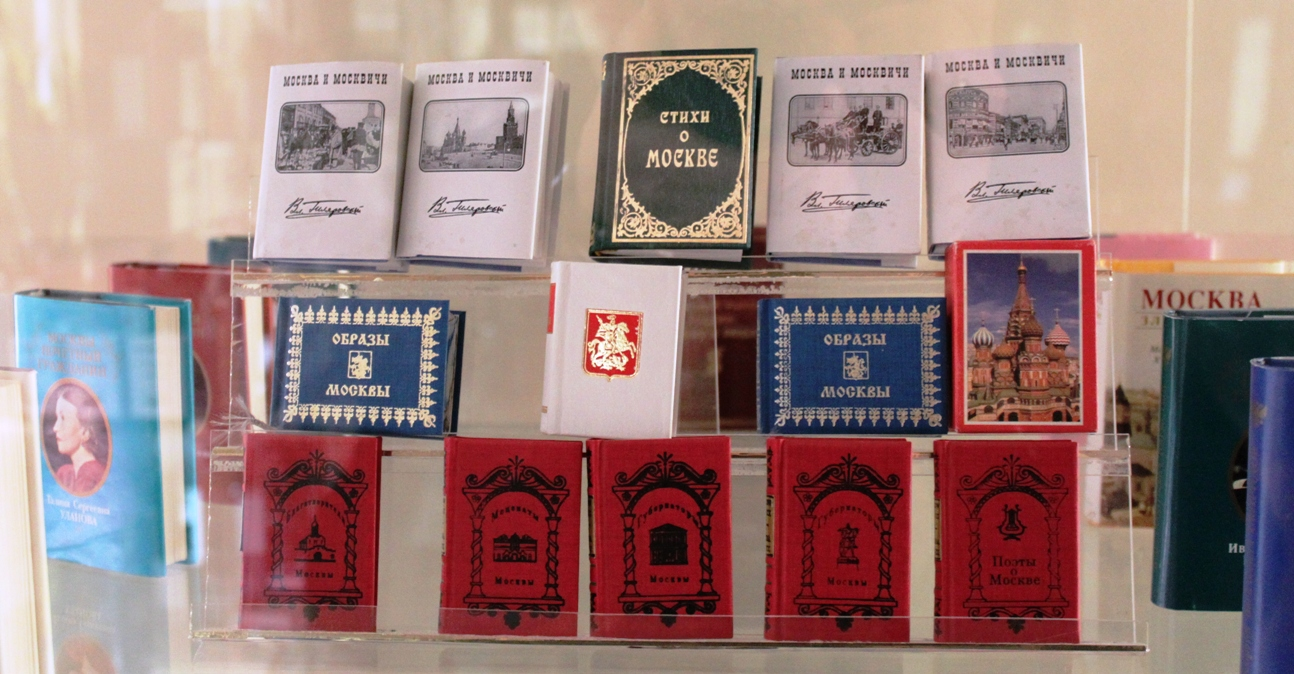
