= Aidan Salahova =

Russian artist (born 1964)

Aidan Salakhova
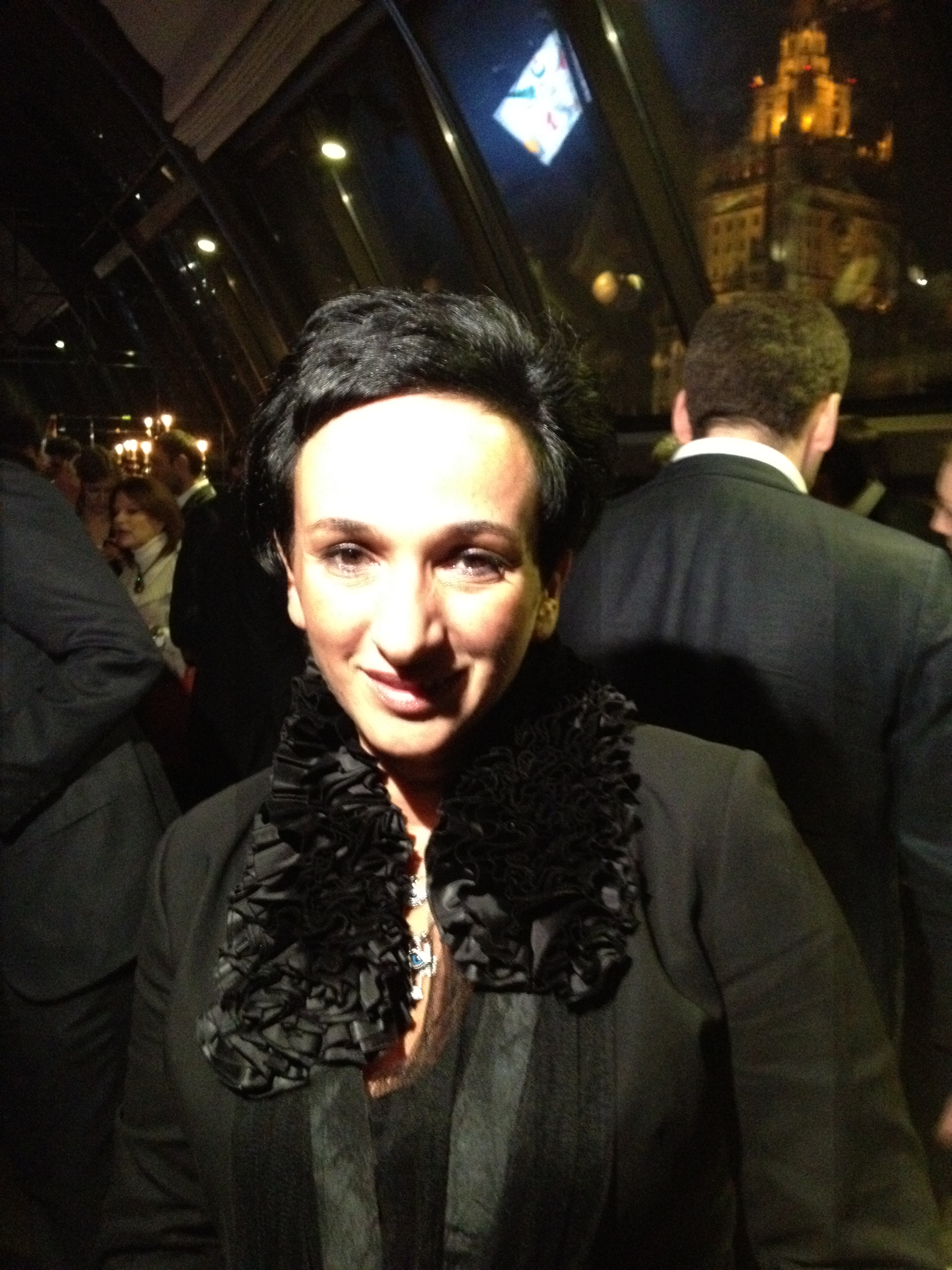
- Born: Aidan Salahova; March 16, 1964 (age 62); Moscow, Russia
- Education: V. Surikov Moscow State Academy Art Institute
- Awards: Silver medal by Russian Academy of Fine Arts
- Elected: Academician of Russian Academy of Fine Arts
- Website: www.aidans.ru

Aidan Salahova (Azerbaijani: Aydan Tair qızı Salahova; born March 25, 1964) is a Soviet and Russian artist of Azerbaijani descent, gallerist and public person. In 1992 she founded the Aidan Gallery in Moscow. Salahova's works can be found in many private and state collections including the State Tretyakov Gallery, the Moscow Museum of Modern Art, the Ekaterina Cultural Foundation, Francois Pinault Foundation, Teutloff Museum and the Boghossian Foundation; in private collections of I. Khalilov, Matan Uziel family collection, P-K. Broshe, T. Novikov, V. Nekrasov, V. Bondarenko and others. At the 2011 Venice Biennale, Salahova's name hit the headlines when her work was politically censored.

== Biography ==
Aidan Salahova was born in 1964 in Moscow in the family of Azeri and Russian artist Tahir Salahov, who is the vice-president of the Russian Academy of Arts, and a laureate of state awards in Russia and Azerbaijan. In 1987 she graduated from the Moscow State Surikov Institute of Fine Arts (Moscow School of Painting, Sculpture and Architecture) as an external student. Since 2000, Aidan Salahova is professor at the institute. Since 2007, she is an Academician of the Russian Academy of Fine Arts.

In the late 1980s Salahova became one of the most significant art figures of the new generation in post-Soviet countries In 2002 Aidan was awarded a silver medal by the Russian Academy of Fine Arts. In 2005-2007 she was a member of the Public Chamber.

Having worked for over twenty years as both an artist and a gallerist she has been one of the strongest influences on the development of contemporary art in post-Soviet Russia.

Salahova has exhibited her work at major international art fairs and biennales, including twice at the Venice Biennale (1991 and 2011) and at the Second Moscow Biennale of Contemporary Art (2007).

== Artworks ==
Salahova's art won recognition not only in the Russian art community, but also internationally. Aidan is a regular participant of major international art fairs and biennales including the Venice Biennale of Contemporary Art (1991, 2011), the 2nd Moscow Biennale of Contemporary Art (2007), etc. In her works, Salahova investigates gender themes, women's sexuality in the context of Islam, contrasts between the East and the West, matters of prohibition, esotericism, and beauty. She is one of the key artists on a contemporary Russian art scene working in various mediums, such as photography, sculpture, painting, and installations.

Aidan Salahova marries Eastern Islamic with Western feminist influences, combining her Azerbaijani background with her Eastern European upbringing. Her “Persian Miniatures” series explores the feminine identity in an Islamic context.

Missing elements carry as much weight as those that are visualized. Feminine figures are delicately portrayed, with the male presence noticeably absent. The drawings are flat and their subjects anonymous, rendering them interchangeable and representational.

Her execution traces back to Persian miniatures from which the series takes its name. Her selection of this style is fitting, as Persian miniatures historically were private books, allowing artists to express themselves more freely than they would with more public wall art. Although these are typically executed in vibrant, vivid colors, Salahova's miniatures are more somber, as though carrying the strength and the weight of their subjects.

Highly semiotic, Salahova's work plays on the capability of representative imagery to represent a multitude of meanings, primary among which is women's position within established social conventions. Her symbols are far from mundane, featuring images such as the gourd, a womb-like symbol of fertility. Also recurring is the minaret symbol, representing faith and power, as well as unity given its function as the location of the call to prayer. Water, a symbol of purity and life across a number of civilizations and religions is also an expression of tears as the inner emotional sea.

== Personal exhibitions ==
- 2016 Revelations Saatchi Gallery, London, UK
- 2015 Reachless, Serpukhov Historical and Art Museum, Serpukhov, Russia
- 2013 Out of Body, Quadro Fine Art Gallery, Dubai, UAE
- 2012-13 Fascinates & Tremendum, MMOMA, Moscow, Russia
- 2012 Persian miniatures, Quadro Fine Art Gallery, Dubai, UAE
- 2009 Kicik Qualart, Baku, Azerbaijan
- 2008 Persian miniatures. XL-Gallery, Moscow, Russia
- 2007 Red. Project of Yves Saint Laurent. State Centre of Contemporary Art, Moscow, Russia
- 2007 Persian Miniatures. AMT Gallery, Como, Italy
- 2006 Aidan Salahova. Painting, Drawing. D-137 Gallery, St. Petersburg, Russia
- 2005 I love myself. XL Gallery, Moscow, Russia
- 2005 Abstract. Dom Cultural Center, Moscow, Russia
- 2004 Habibi. D-137 Gallery, St. Petersburg, Russia
- 2004 Habibi. Orel Art Presenta Galerie, Paris, France
- 2004 MMS. XL-Gallery, Moscow, Russia
- 2002 Kaaba. XL-Gallery, Moscow, Russia
- 2002 Habibi. Volker Diehl Gallery, Berlin, Germany
- 2001 Odalisque (in conjunction with “ART MOSKVA studio”). Central House of Artists, Moscow, Russia
- 2001 Living Pictures. D-137 Gallery, St. Petersburg, Russia
- 2000 Tea in the Desert. Invogue boutique, Moscow, Russia
- 2000 The Sleeping Beauty (XL Gallery, in cooperation with the European Galleries association). Kunstlerhaus Bethanien, Berlin, Germany
- 1999 Suspense. Museum of 20th Century Art, Kemerovo
- 1999–2000 After the Wall. Art and Culture in post-Communist Europe. Moderna Museet, Stockholm; Hamburger Bahnhof Berlin; Ludwig Museum, Budapesht
- 1998 Diva (project of XL Gallery in conjunction with Photobiennale 98). Manezh Central Exhibition Hall, Moscow, Russia
- 1998 Suspense. XL Gallery, Moscow, Russia
- 1997 Antonyms. New Academy of Fine Arts, St. Petersburg, Russia
- 1996 New Acquisitions. XL Gallery, Moscow, Russia
- 1992 Golden Confession. Sprovieri Gallery, Roma, Italy
- 1992 Leda and the Swan. Berman - E.N. Gallery, New York, USA
- 1991 Golden Confession. First Gallery, Moscow, Russia

== Incident at the 54th Venice Biennale ==
In June 2011, Salahova was representing the Azerbaijan Pavilion among other national artists at the 54th Venice Biennale. Two of her artworks previously approved by the ministry of culture were ordered to be covered and eventually removed from the exhibition a day before the opening, "because of government sensitives towards the nation's status as a secular Muslim country". The officials said the works had been damaged during transportation. Commenting on the conflict the pavilion curator Beral Madra stated that the concept of the removed sculptures had been misinterpreted by the government, and added that in over 25 years of curating she "ever experienced this kind of conflict". In an article entitled "Vagina Art Veiled at Azerbaijan's Venice Biennale Pavilion, Causing Some to Cry Censorship", Kate Deimling stated that "Black Stone," a "sculpture depicting the black stone in Mecca venerated by Muslims within a vagina-like marble frame, were both covered up".

== Aidan Gallery ==
Founded in Moscow in 1992 by Aidan Salahova, the gallery today is one of the most prestigious private galleries of modern and contemporary art in Russia. Traditionally, the Aidan Gallery is highly appraised by critics, collectors and audience at international contemporary art fairs and exhibitions, such as The Armony Show (United States), FIAC (France), Liste (Switzerland), Art Forum Berlin (Germany), ARCO (Spain), Vienna Art Fair (Austria), Art Dubai (UAE), Art Brussels (Belgium). The gallery works with artists, who combine straight conceptualism with radical Aestheticism, such as: Rauf Mamedov, Elena Berg, Nikola Ovchinnikov, Konstantin Latyshev and others.
