= Rudier Foundry =

French foundry

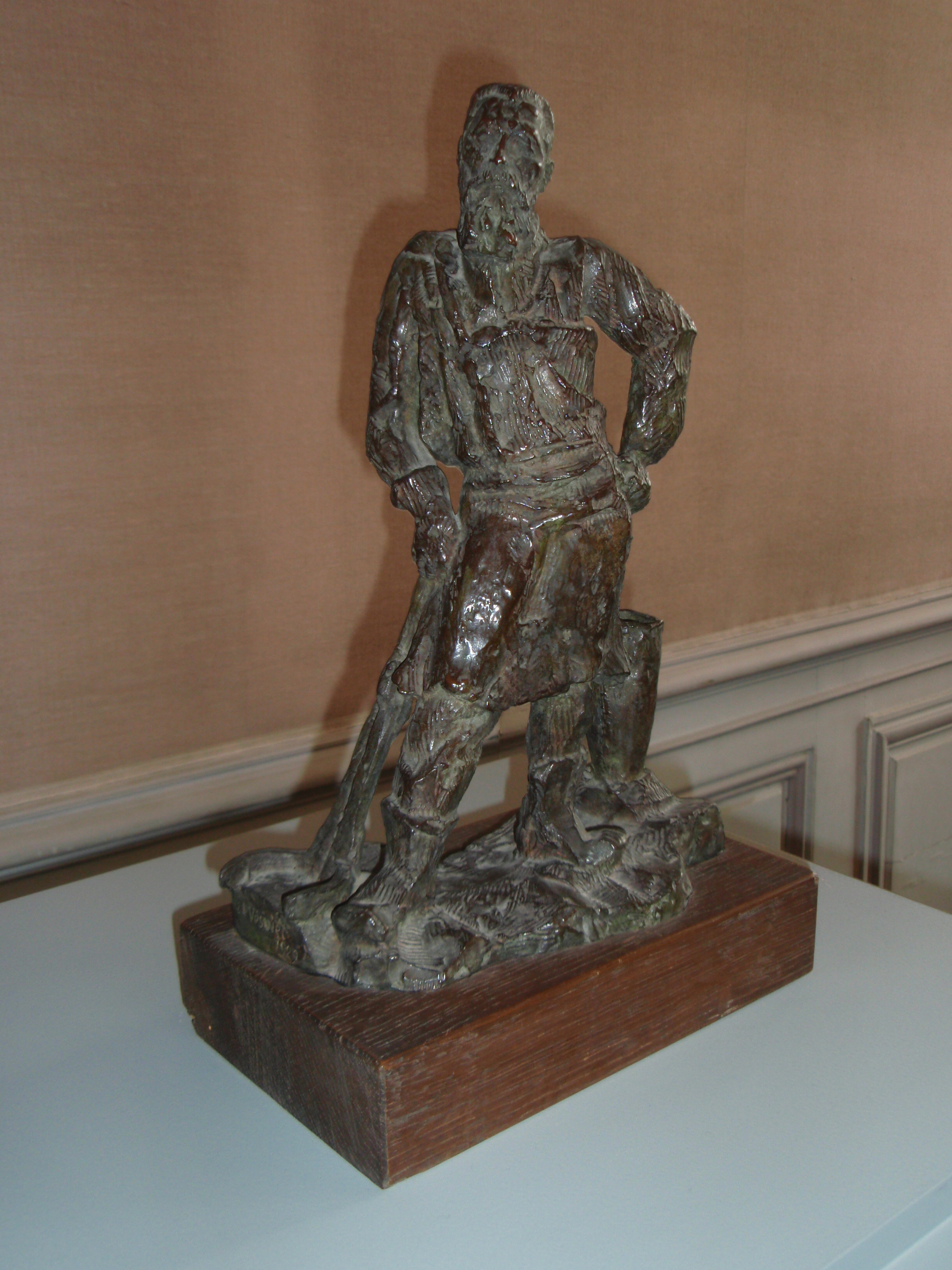
Antoine Bourdelle, Portrait of Eugène Rudier, Paris, musée Rodin.

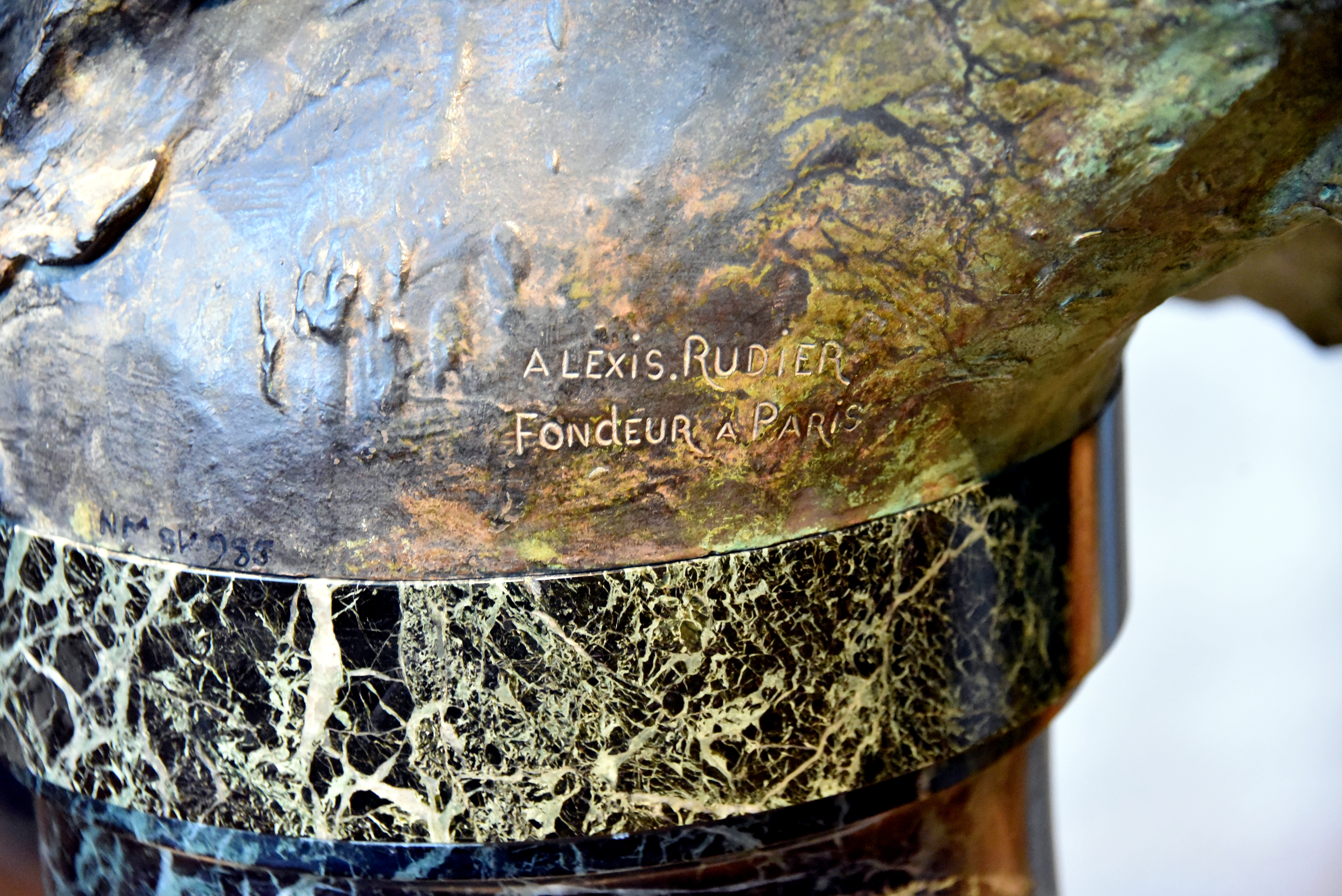
Alexis Rudier Fondeur À Paris. Written on the bust of Bellona by Auguste Rodin, 1879. Nationalmuseum, Stockholm, Sweden

The Rudier Foundry (Fonderie Rudier) was a foundry run by Alexis Rudier (died 1897) and his son Eugène Rudier (1875–1952). It worked with some of the most notable sculptors of the 19th and 20th centuries, including Auguste Rodin, Antoine Bourdelle, Gustave Miklos, Aristide Maillol and Daumier. Their casts were signed "Alexis RUDIER Fondeur PARIS".

== Bibliography (in French) ==
- P.P. Dupont et C. Huberty, Les fonderies de bronzes, 1990.
- Élisabeth Lebon, Dictionnaire des fondeurs de bronze d'art : France, 1890-1950, Perth, Australie, Marjon, 2003, 291 p. (ISBN 978-0-975-02000-5 et 0-975-02000-5, OCLC 804167148).
- Paul Moreau-Vauthier, Le maître fondeur Eugène Rudier, l'Art et les artistes, mars 1936, p. 203-209.
- Art et Industrie 1er Trimestre 1949
- Jean Bouret, La dame de bronze et le monsieur de métal , Arts, 5 janvier 1951
- Dina Vierny & Bertrand Lorquin, Maillol, la passion du bronze, Paris, fondation Dina Vierny, musée Maillol, 1995
