= The Charleston Chronicle =

American newspaper

- Type: Weekly newspaper
- Founder: James J. French
- Publisher: Tolbert Smalls
- Editor: Damion Smalls
- Founded: August 19, 1971; 54 years ago
- Ceased publication: 2021
- Headquarters: 1111 King Street; Charleston, South Carolina 29403
- City: Charleston
- Country: United States
- Circulation: 6,000
- ISSN: 0746-1429
- OCLC number: 28446174
- Website: charlestonchronicle.net

The Charleston Chronicle was a weekly newspaper serving the African-American and Black communities in Charleston, South Carolina. The paper was founded in 1971 by James J. French and it ceased publication shortly after his death in 2021.

The paper was a member of the National Newspaper Publishers Association (NNPA), a trade group of more than 200 Black-owned media companies in the United States. Its estimated circulation is 6,000 copies in 2020. Damion Smalls was the paper's editor and Tolbert Smalls was the publisher as of 2018.

== History ==
James J. French moved from Kansas City to Charleston, South Carolina, in the 1960s, while in the Navy. After serving in Vietnam, receiving the Bronze Star Medal and a Presidential Citation, he retired from the Navy in 1969, and began publishing The Charleston Chronicle on August 19, 1971. In 2012, the South Carolina Senate honored James J. French's contributions to South Carolina, including the founding of The Charleston Chronicle, by renaming the juncture of U.S. Route 17 and Magnolia Road in Charleston, the "James J. French Intersection". French published the paper weekly for 45 years consecutively. Because of his contributions through the newspaper, James French received South Carolina’s highest civilian award, the Order of the Palmetto, and the city of Charleston proclaimed October 22 as "Jim French Day". James French died at the age of 94 on July 31, 2021.

The paper was handed over to Tolbert Smalls Jr., James J. French's grandson, and Damion Smalls, Tolbert's brother, in 2016. In 2016, the South Carolina General Assembly recognized Tolbert Smalls Jr. "for his significant contributions in bringing indispensable news to the African-American community in Charleston, Dorchester, and Berkeley counties".

In March 2020, The Chronicle’s office on King Street was vacated at the onset of COVID-19 pandemic. In January 2021, the newspaper produced its last edition. The website was disabled shortly after the death of founder James J. French. At some point the website went back online and is assessable as of Dec. 3, 2023.

== Notable coverage ==
In 2016, long-time Charleston Chronicle reporter Barney Blakeney was quoted by NPR for a story about the retirement of long-time Charleston mayor, Joe Riley. Blakeney criticized the retiring mayor, who oversaw a revitalization of the city but with benefits not equally distributed among racial groups. Blakeney said, "Today as he leaves office, the city of Charleston is 70 percent white. Joe Riley totally flipped the racial demographics in Charleston during his 40-year tenure."

Malcolm Graham, brother of Cynthia Hurd, who was murdered by Dylann Roof at the Emanuel AME Church, wrote an op-ed in The Charleston Chronicle in 2015. The op-ep, titled "My Sister Was Killed in the Charleston Church Shooting. Removing the Confederate Flag Isn't Nearly Enough", arguing that "Ultimately, the flag is just a symbol. Its removal must be the beginning of bigger reforms that empower America’s African Americans."

The Secret Gumbo Grove, an award-winning children's book written by Eleanora E. Tate, was based on a three-part story she published in The Charleston Chronicle.

In 2019, Mayor Pete Buttigieg wrote an op-ed in newspaper, outlining his Douglass Plan. Buttigieg was one of two presidential candidates at the time who published campaign ads in that paper.

== Awards ==
In 2017, Nanette French Smalls received a Legacy Award from the Sister Summit Foundation for her role at the paper. Legacy Awards are given to recognize the work of women of color in the Charleston community.

Also in 2017, The Charleston Chronicle received The Corporate Lifetime Achievement Award from the Charleston Branch NAACP.
