= White Point Garden =

Public park in peninsular Charleston, South Carolina

Coordinates: 32.7698°N 79.9304°W

- Interactive map of White Point Garden
- Location: 2 Murray Blvd.
- Area: 5.7 acres (2.3 ha)
- Created: 1800s
- Operator: City of Charleston

White Point Garden is a 5.7 acre public park located in peninsular Charleston, South Carolina, at the tip of the peninsula. It is the southern terminus for the Battery, a defensive seawall and promenade. It is bounded by East Battery (to the east), Murray Blvd. (to the south), King St. (to the west), and South Battery (to the north).

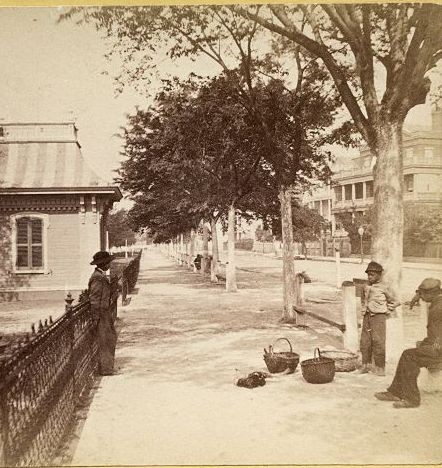
Vendors are shown near Meeting and South Battery selling poultry. The Victorian pavilion and iron fence no longer exist.

== History ==
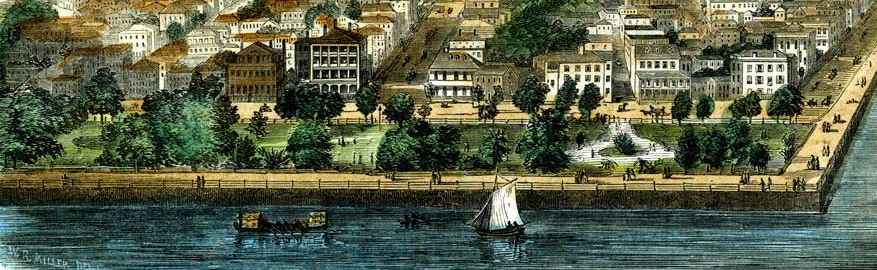
White Point Garden was illustrated in a bird's eye view map of Charleston published in 1851.

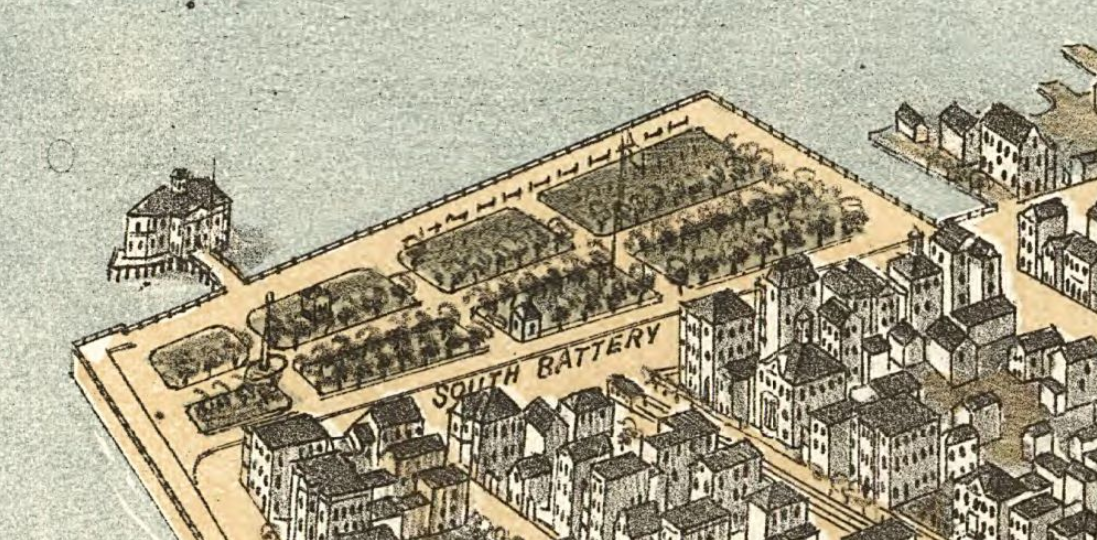
White Point Garden was shown on the 1872 Bird's Eye View map of Charleston with a bath house in place along the Ashley River.

The southern tip of Charleston's peninsula was originally known as the South Bay and later Oyster Point. In the early 19th century it was renamed White Point. Later, landfill projects resulted in the sharp-edged terminus of the peninsula.

From about 1840 to 1881, a public bathing house stood at the end of King Street. The building was constructed by James English, William Patton, and Henry L. Pinckney at a cost of about $25,000. A cake and ice cream parlor was operated on the top floor of the bathing house. The bathing house was damaged several times due to storms, but was rebuilt each time. It was removed in 1881 as White Point Garden and the waterfront were filled in.

Throughout the 19th and early 20th century, from the Reconstruction era to the emergence of Jim Crow laws, Black Charlestonians occupied public spaces such as White Point Garden on Independence Day to celebrate freedom from slavery. On any other day, it was not permitted for blacks to enter the public park, and they were not allowed to sit on public benches.

White Point Gardens was commonly known as a gay cruising spot by Charlestonians well into the 20th century. Because of the prominence of gay cruising in the public park, efforts were made to close down the public restrooms.

== Features ==
For more than a century, White Point Garden has been a repository of relics and memorials, with a largely military theme.

In July 1897, two 10-inch columbiads that had been stored at Fort Sumter after the American Civil War, were given by the federal government to a park in Kokomo, Indiana, for use as ornamentation. It was unknown whether the particular guns had actually been in service during the Civil War. On July 30, 1897, an opinion piece appeared in the Charleston Evening Post in response to the news of the giveaway to Kokomo that suggested that the remaining guns at Fort Sumter (perhaps twenty) be secured for use in Charleston's own parks. Later that year, Charleston's City Council voted in favor (with one vote in opposition) to request the balance of the guns from the United States Department of War. The Department of War eventually loaned ten guns to Charleston. Some were put on display at the then-Thomson Auditorium temporarily, while two of the guns from USS Keokuk were installed at White Point Garden in 1900. Keokuk was sunk by Charleston's forts in April 1863; the Confederates later salvaged and used these guns.

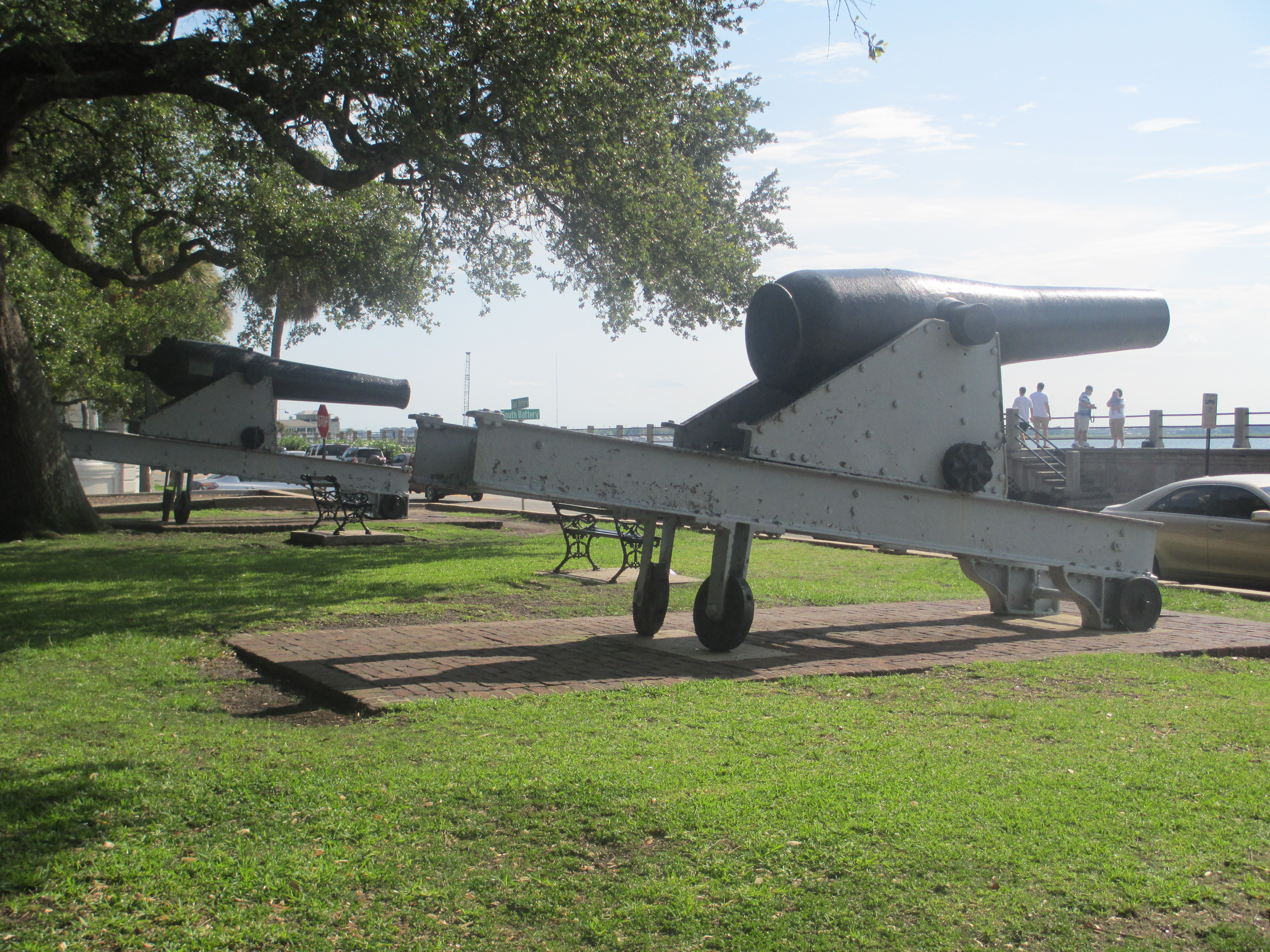
An 11-inch Dahlgren gun and a 10-inch Confederate columbiad face toward East Battery.

Placed at irregular intervals around three sides of the perimeter of White Point Garden are several military relics. Along East Battery are the 11-inch Dahlgren gun from the USS Keokuk that fired shells at Fort Sumter in 1863 and two Confederate columbiads (large cannons) that were used in the defense of Fort Sumter. On Murray Blvd. there are several more artillery pieces: a rare 7-inch Brooke rifle (a large cannon) that was found at Fort Johnson and four 13-inch Union mortars (weighing 17,000 pounds each). On the King St. side are a 1918 World War I howitzer; a French cannon of Revolutionary War vintage that was found in Camden, South Carolina; and a rapid-fire gun from a Spanish ship captured during the Spanish–American War.

Among the many cannons on display, one has been identified to be a fake. In the early 1900s, a 4-pound British cannon thought to be of the colonial era was lodged halfway into the middle of Longitude Alley, supposedly to prevent dray carriages from using the narrow passage. In 1933, the City decided to unearth the cannon and relocate it in White Point Garden at the intersection of a projected Church Street extension and Murray Blvd. The residents of Longitude Lane were unhappy at the loss of their relic, and demanded its return, but the City was not moved.

Meanwhile, a prankster hired a foundry to create a fake cannon of the same era. He aged the cannon by submerging it in water for six months at his dock and then sold it to an antique store in Beaufort, South Carolina. When it was "discovered" there, it was bought by a visitor from the North and brought to Charleston. The buyer offered it to the residents of Longitude Lane to replace their cannon, but they rejected the offer, instead demanding the original cannon. The City, however, believed the cannon to be genuine and acquired it for display. The cannon fooled many people, but it suffered a telltale anachronism: because the foundry did not have the tools to fabricate an actual cannon, the foundry instead poured molten metal around a section of cast iron pipe, even though cast iron pipe was not in common usage until the 19th century. The Longitude Alley cannon stood across the park at the intersection of Church St. and South Battery; it was removed by the City following vandalism (possibly an attempted theft) and was then either lost or stolen. It has not been seen since.

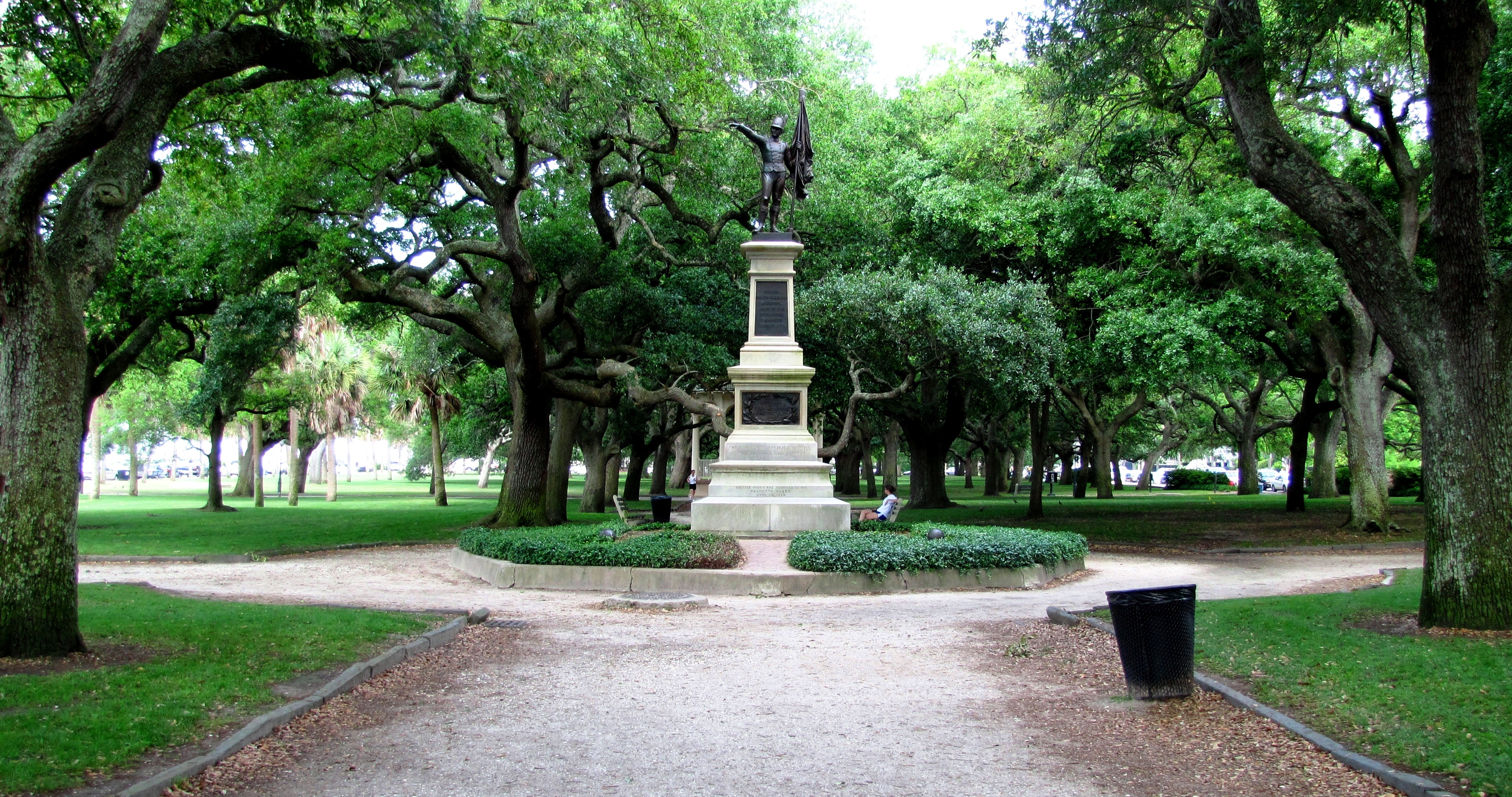
The Defenders of Fort Moultrie. It bears the inscription "To the Defenders of Fort Moultrie - June the 28th, 1776."

Along the center walkway in line with Church St. is The Defenders of Fort Moultrie, honoring South Carolinian soldiers during the Battle of Sullivan's Island. It is often called the Jasper Monument since it shows a statue of Sergeant William Jasper, a hero of the Revolutionary War battle won by the colonists at Fort Moultrie on Sullivan's Island on June 28, 1776. The memorial was added in 1877.

At the northeast corner is a marker, erected in 1943, to the Gentleman Pirate Stede Bonnet. The monument commemorates the hanging near that site of pirate captain Stede Bonnet and his crew in 1718, as well as the 1719 hanging of Richard Worley's pirates. The monument states that 29 of Bonnet's crew were executed close by. Although 29 of Bonnet's crew were sentenced to death, the evidence suggests that only 22 were actually hanged.

Located across from Meeting Street in the center of the park, a bandstand, begun in 1906 and completed in 1907, is a memorial to Mrs. George W. Williams, by her daughter, Mrs. Martha W. Carrington. The bandstand, designed by William Martin Aiken and built by Robert McArtney, cost more than $5,000 when it was built, and hosted regular concerts. The new bandstand replaced a dilapidated wood structure. The inaugural concert for the new bandstand was held on June 28, 1907 to celebrate Carolina Day with music by Metz's Military Band.

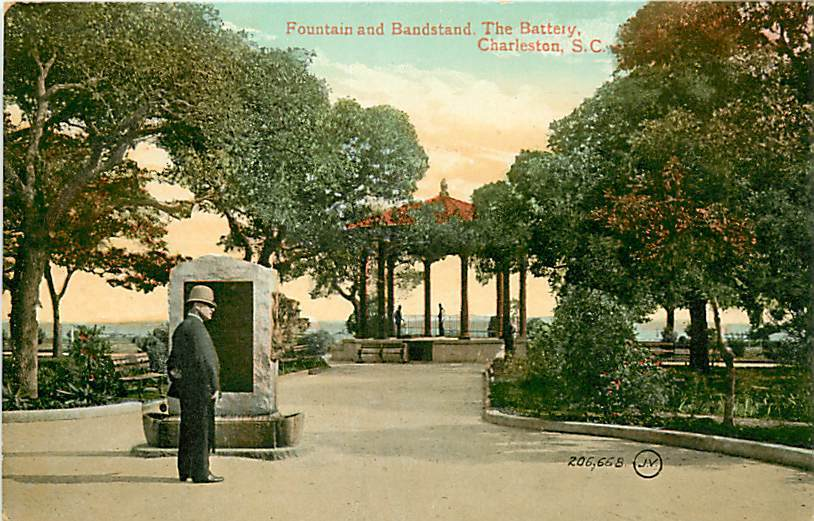
The bandstand was shown in an early postcard.

In 1978, in response to neighbors about noise and commercial activity, concerts were outlawed at the bandstand. In 1985, the bandstand received a $30,000 restoration (including $8,000 in private funds), and a request was made to resume musical performances. The request was rejected, and although the bandstand is used for weddings and limited special events, concerts are not allowed. In 1934, the pavilion was raised three feet and restrooms were installed under the structure. In 2008, the City announced a plan to restore the bandstand and lower it to its original height of three instead of six feet. The restoration was completed in April, 2010.

In 1962, Charleston sculptor Willard Hirsch was commissioned by Miss Sally Carrington to create a bronze statue of a dancing girl. The statue was a gift to the City and was installed as a water fountain in White Point Garden on an especially low granite base so that children could make easy use of it.

Among the military relics on display was once the capstan of the USS Maine. The capstan was salvaged from the Maine when it was raised from the bottom of Havana Harbor, and its parts were meted out to communities all over the country. The capstan was donated to Charleston by Sen. Ben Tillman, but sat in the basement of City Hall for several years before being installed in Hampton Park. Later, the capstan was relocated to the U.S. Navy Base and then later to White Point Garden. It was displayed atop a concrete base on the eastern edge of the park. In 2007, the capstan was removed, and a statue of William Moultrie was installed in the same location. The 8-foot statue, atop a 7-foot pedestal, depicts a uniformed Moultrie, sword in sheath, holding his hat at his side as he appears to survey Charleston Harbor. It was sculpted by John Ney Michel.

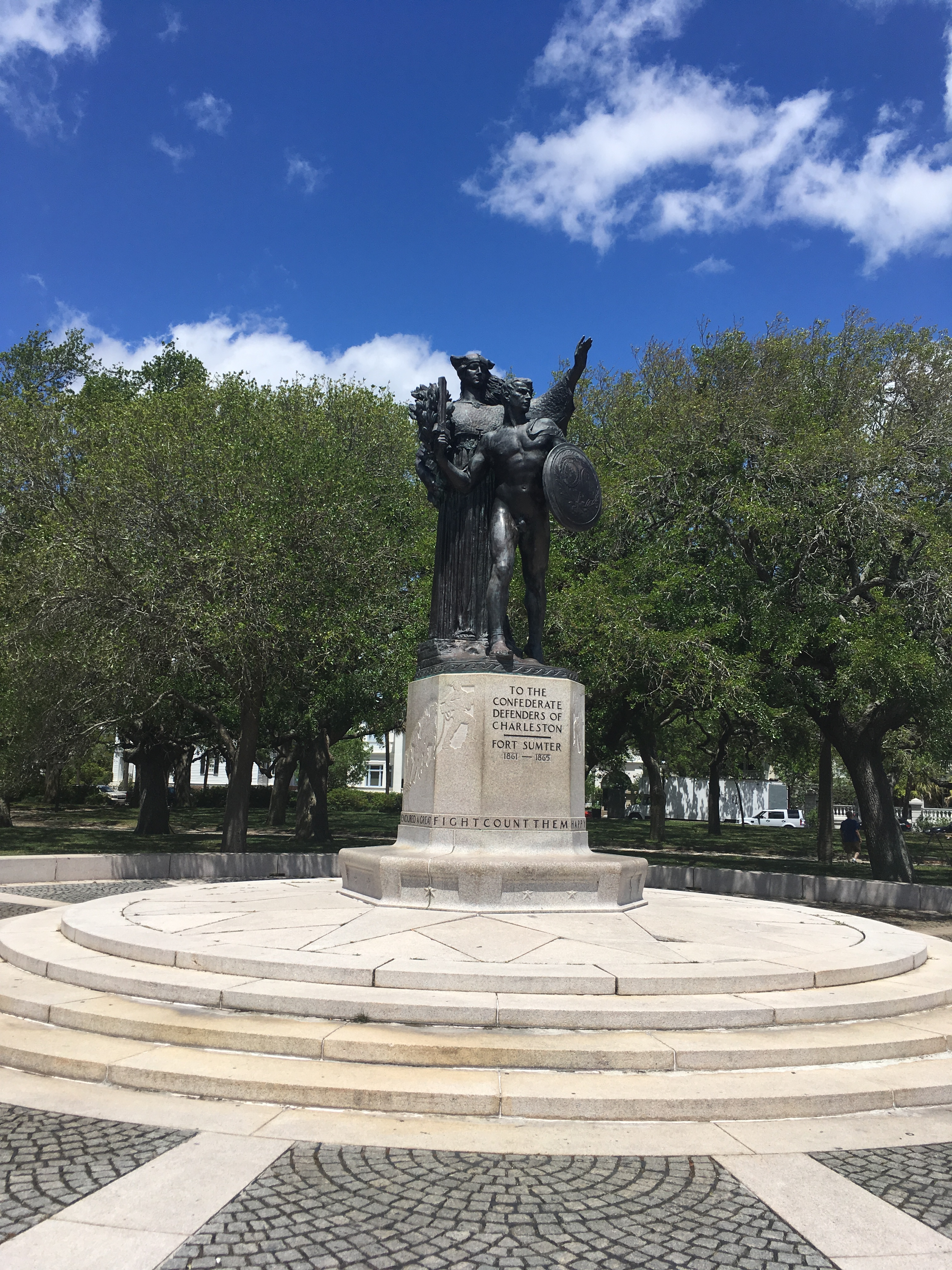
The United Daughters of the Confederacy allegorical monument Confederate Defenders of Charleston stands at the southern tip of Charleston's peninsula in the southeast corner of White Point Garden.

At the southeastern corner of White Point Garden is a large allegorical statue installed in 1932 by the United Daughters of the Confederacy. The monument titled, Confederate Defenders of Charleston, commemorates the soldiers who fought for their city and the southern States during the Civil War. The bronze statue is 12 feet tall and rests on a granite base 13 feet tall. The sculptor was Hermon Atkins MacNeil.

Near the southwest corner of the park is a memorial to the crew of the USS Amberjack, a submarine that was sunk during World War II, and 51 other American submarines lost during the conflict.

Also located near the southwest corner of the park, is the 20-foot tall, granite Hobson Monument. On April 26, 1952, the U.S. destroyer Hobson was cut in half and sunk after being involved in a collision with the U.S. aircraft carrier Wasp. The stones used in the platform come from the 38 home states of the 176 sailors who died. The Hobson was built at the Charleston Navy Yard.

At the meeting of Meeting St. and South Battery, is a memorial to the crew of the H.L. Hunley. Added in 1899, the granite monument recognizes the first successful submarine, the Hunley, which eventually sank in Charleston Harbor following a successful attack on the USS Housatonic.

Along the center walkway in the park, halfway between Church and Meeting, is a bronze bust, atop a granite column, of William Gilmore Simms (1806-1870), a poet, novelist, and historian, whose history of South Carolina served as the definitive textbook on state history for much of the 20th century. Sculpted by John Quincy Adams Ward, the monument was added in 1879. The base for the bust was designed by Edward Brickell White.
