= Harry Stendhal =

American art dealer (born 20th century)

Harry Stendhal (born 20th century) is an American gallerist, arts organization founder, and entrepreneur.

== Galleries ==
As an art dealer, he operated the Stendhal commercial gallery in the Soho section of New York City and then the Maya Stendhal Gallery in Chelsea section of New York City (in partnership with his sister, Maya). His galleries exhibited artists including the painters Ron English and Rick Prol, the Dadaist Hans Richter and the Fluxus group members Ken Friedman and Larry Miller.

In 2007, Richter's artistic archives were displayed at the gallery in an exhibition comprehensive of his Dada years and collaboration with Viking Eggeling, a fellow Dadaist who created the film Symphonie Diagonal and Hans Richter Rhythmus 21. The exhibition, entitled Universal Language and the Avant-Garde, was covered in Artforum.

After exhibiting George Macunias's work at his now-closed gallery, he opened the foundation in 2011. When it had an artspace, the organization's purpose was to exhibit the entire inter-disciplinary body work of Macunias, the Lithuanian-born co-founder of the Fluxus art movement. Stendhal's exhibitions of Maciunas's work were covered by, among others, Anthony Haden-Guest in the Financial Times and Fionn Meade in ArtForum.

In 1991, the Soho gallery hosted a benefit organized for the charity God's Love We Deliver, which brings meals to homebound people with AIDS and other serious illnesses. The benefit was organized by fashion photographer Francesco Scavullo and featured men's suits by designers, including Issac Mizrahi, Todd Oldham and Romeo Gigli, which were then embellished (painted upon) by such artists as Ronnie Cutrone and Ron English.

In 2004, Harry and his sister Maya commissioned the painter and filmmaker Jeff Scher to create an animated film portrait of their friend Susan Shin and then offered the ability to commission a similar rendering to gallery clients. This endeavor was reported on by The New York Times.

Stendhal himself is a presence on the New York City social scene; his events draw press coverage as does his goings on about town.

During the second incarnation of his gallery, Stendhal became ensnared in legal imbroglios with graphic designer and visual artist Paula Scher and the filmmaker and visual artist Jonas Mekas, a then-octagenarian, who accused the Stendhal gallery of selling his artwork without his consent and or reimbursement for among other things as an avenue for Stendhal to cover his tab at the restaurant Cipriani Downtown. The Mekas case was eventually settled out of court.

== Fluxus llc. and the Fluxhouse ==
In 2013, he co-founded Fluxus llc, a privately held construction technology firm. In 2020, Fluxus – with cooperation with Arcadis – presented Harnessing Prefabrication to Tackle the Affordable Housing Challenge: A Global Partnership Approach at the Advancing Prefabrication conference in Dallas, Texas. The firm's prototype, the "Fluxhouse", is shown in augmented reality on the website of the World Economic Forum for whom Fluxus llc. is helping to implement augmented reality technology.
