= Tierra del Fuego (disambiguation) =

Tierra del Fuego is an archipelago at the southernmost tip of South America, shared between Chile, and Argentina.

Tierra del Fuego may also refer to:

== Places ==
- Isla Grande de Tierra del Fuego, main island of the aforementioned archipelago
- Tierra del Fuego Province, Chile
- Tierra del Fuego Province, Argentina
- Tierra del Fuego National Park, a national park on the Argentine part of the island

== Entertainment ==
- Tierra del Fuego (1948 film), a 1948 film by Mario Soffici
- Tierra del Fuego (film), a 2000 film by Miguel Littín
- La Tierra del Fuego, an album by Roy Campbell
- Tierra del Fuego, an album by Argentine band Virus

== Other uses ==
- Tierra del Fuego, an Australian property development company owned by Ian Kiernan in the 1970s
