= Valerie Hegarty =

American artist (born 1967)

- Born: 1967 (age 58–59); Burlington, Vermont, US
- Education: School of the Art Institute of Chicago, Academy of Art College, Middlebury College
- Known for: Painting, sculpture, installation art
- Movement: Conceptual Art
- Awards: Pollock-Krasner Foundation, Gottlieb Foundation, Louis Comfort Tiffany Foundation, New York Foundation for the Arts
- Website: Valerie Hegarty

Valerie Hegarty, Alternative Histories: The Canes Acres Plantation Dining Room, mixed media, dimensions variable, 2013.

Valerie Hegarty (born 1967) is an American painter, sculptor, and installation artist. She is known for irreverent, often critical works that replicate canonical paintings, furnishings, and architectural spaces from American or personal history undergoing various processes of transformation. Hegarty most often portrays her recreations in meticulously realized, trompe l’oeil states of decay, ruin, or physical attack related to their circumstances (e.g., a seascape pierced by harpoons, a still life of food being eaten by crows). Her work examines American historical themes involving colonization, slavery, Manifest Destiny, nationalism, art-historical movements and their ideological tenets, romantic conceptions of nature, and environmental degradation. Sculpture critic Robin Reisenfeld wrote that among other things, Hegarty's art is "informed by 19th-century American landscape painting as an expression of the sublime, as well as by the manufacturing of two-dimensional 'masterworks' to be destroyed in three-dimensional fashion in order to evoke entropic forces of growth and decay."

Hegarty has exhibited at venues including the Brooklyn Museum, MoMA PS1, Museum of Contemporary Art, Chicago (MCA), and Artists Space. She has received awards from the Pollock-Krasner Foundation, Adolph and Esther Gottlieb Foundation and Louis Comfort Tiffany Foundation, among others. Her work belongs to institutional collections including the Brooklyn Museum, Hood Museum of Art, Portland Museum of Art, Perez Art Museum, and Wadsworth Atheneum Museum of Art. She is based between New York City and Sullivan County, New York.

== Education and early career ==
Hegarty was born in 1967 in Burlington, Vermont. She received a BA in studio art from Middlebury College in 1989 and a BFA in illustration from the Academy of Art College in San Francisco in 1995, before undertaking graduate studies at the School of the Art Institute of Chicago (MFA, 2002). After graduating, she exhibited in group shows at the Bronx Museum of Art, Drawing Center, Smack Mellon, MoMA PS1, White Columns, and Artists Space, and solo exhibitions at MCA Chicago (2003) and Guild & Greyshkul (2005, 2006), among others. Her later solo exhibitions have taken place at Nicelle Beauchene Gallery, Marlborough Chelsea and Malin Gallery in New York, the Brooklyn Museum, Burning in Water (New York and San Francisco), and Locust Projects (Miami), among others.

Hegarty is also a writer—her story "Cats vs. Cancer" was published in the New England Review in 2019 and won a PEN America Dau Prize in 2020 for short story debut.

Valerie Hegarty, Childhood Bedroom, painted paper, glue, cardboard and fabric, 9' x 15' x 13', 2004.

== Work and reception ==
Hegarty's best-known works are painting-sculptures and installations that employ trompe l’oeil construction—often layering paper, cardboard, cloth, papier-mâché and paint on objects, walls and floors—which she then peels, degrades or attacks through various means. She has described the combined process as "reverse archaeology," and it mirrors her interest in the mutative energy of growth, decay and regeneration. Her process involves careful attention to the material effects of destructive forces (rot, overgrown nature, fire, dilapidation), producing surprising juxtapositions: weathered, damaged and aging environments integrated into pristine gallery spaces; violent forces unleashed into opulent period rooms; romantic landscapes come to life with sprouting leaves and branches.

=== Early installations ===
Hegarty's early work explored architecture, artifice, ephemerality and memory, often by resurrecting physical environments of the past through a process of layering illusionistic imagery on paper and then peeling it to expose strata—as in an archeological diagram—evoking senses of nostalgia, displacement, mortality, or emergent repressed forces. Two works created in Chicago—Hotel Lobby, West Loop (Gallery 400, 2002) and Green Bathroom (MCA Chicago, 2003)—partially transformed gallery spaces, respectively, into an aging downtown hotel and a recreation of her studio bathroom in a future state of neglect. For "Play Pen" (Drawing Center, 2004), she created a to-scale rendition of the perimeter of her childhood bedroom that over the course of the exhibition she peeled away, revealing layers of yellow, periwinkle blue and bubblegum pink representing iterations of the room’s décor.

In the subsequent works, Rosebush (for Gordon Matta Clark) (White Columns, 2005) and Landscaping: PS1 Greater New York (MoMA PS1, 2005), Hegarty created tableaux of nature erupting out of exhibition spaces. Her New York solo-exhibition debut, "Landscaping" (Guild & Greyshkul, 2005), featured three works collapsing exterior and interior views, including a woodland idyll of leaves, branches and a decrepit log cabin emerging from the gallery’s white walls; Artforum's Brian Sholis deemed it an escapist work that "partly literalized the environmentalist fantasy of nature triumphantly overpowering the built realm," while demonstrating "that every site has its history."

Valerie Hegarty, Seascape: Overseas (Fireplace with Harpoons), foamcore, paper, paint, glue and gel medium, approx. 10' x 8' x 8', 2006.

=== Later work ===
In the mid-2000s, Hegarty began creating irreverent painting-sculptures that replicated renowned still-lifes, landscapes and portraits (e.g., by Albert Bierstadt, Frederic Edwin Church and Gilbert Stuart) only to destroy them through detailed simulations of decay and various assaults. Critics suggested that these works "gently ribbed art historical precedents" such as 19th-century expressions of the sublime and challenged both romantic attachments to Americana and the legacy of the nation's "whitewashed history." Reviews described the paper assemblage Still Lives with Crows (2006)—a tableau of crows tearing bloody hunks of meat out of a still life depicting a steak and vegetables—as "a picture of image culture cannibalizing itself," conveying amusement and a "Poe-like eeriness."

In her solo exhibitions "Seascape" (2006), "View From Thanatopsis" (2007) and "Altered States" (2012), Hegarty took over gallery spaces "in kudzu-like fashion," with simulations of shipwrecked and decimated paintings and Colonial furniture, sculptural debris and rot, and plants emerging from fissures in walls and floors. "Seascape's" centerpiece was Overseas (Fireplace with Harpoons), a recreated Federalist-era fireplace, stuck full of harpoons and spattered with simulated tar, slime, mold, and seagull droppings that emanated from a harpoon wound in a reworking of the Church landscape The Icebergs (1861) hung over the mantel. Artforum's Emily Hall wrote that the show portrayed the ocean as an "enormous engine of decay"—a retort to "artists who have sought to frame nature as something over which man has prevailed with moral authority" and to over-estimations of the timelessness of America's colonial values. "View From Thanatopsis" included walls peppered with bullet holes, an armoire eaten to bits, a painting of the Grand Canyon split by a crack tearing through wall and floor, and a burnt, battered and doubled-over replication of Church's 1857 painting, Niagara.

Critics described the "Altered States" exhibition as a faux-Colonial memento mori suggesting a mansion ravaged by fire and floods and reclaimed by the elements, which also pointed to deep fissures in American culture. Its individual works included: the sandy, emaciated Shipwrecked Armoire with Barnacles; Headless George Washington with Table (Lansdowne Portrait), a horrific reimagining of the Stuart portrait, torn asunder and scorched, with its partially melted head sliding onto the gallery floor like a shriveled mask; and Rug with Grass, a shredded, rotted Empire style carpet sprouting reeds and aquatic plants that indicated the potential of growth out of decay. Hegarty's exhibition "Alternative Histories," (Brooklyn Museum, 2013) explored similar themes—colonization, Manifest Destiny, repressed history, mortality—with sculptural interventions in the museum's decorated, period rooms that included a flock of attacking crows, dissolving portraits, vanitas-influenced still lifes and rugs overgrown with vegetation.

Valerie Hegarty, Fresh Start (The Covid Diaries Series), wood, canvas, paper, glue, wire, tape, epoxy clay, dimensions variable, 2021.

In other exhibitions in the 2010s, Hegarty produced works that were more self-contained, physically and thematically. "Cosmic Collisions" (2010) featured discrete wall reliefs and freestanding sculptures—largely riffing on mid-century Abstract Expressionism and minimalism—that were seemingly warped, battered and otherwise altered by astral or earthbound cataclysms. Critics suggested works such as Starry Rothko (2010)—a charred, crumpled barely stable canvas altered by apparent space travel—addressed and spoofed solemn notions of cosmic evolution and modernist transcendence, genius and purity.

The exhibitions "Figure, Flowers, Fruit," (2012) and "American Berserk" (2016) focused on themes of organic decay, growth and excess. The former show featured four canvases—three still lifes and a portrait—sprouting chaotic tangles of flowers and roots (e.g., Flower Frenzy) or forms exploding and protruding from fruit, such as the tongue-like appendage emerging from a painted wedge in Watermelon Tongue. In "American Berserk," Hegarty introduced surreal, anthropomorphic ceramic sculptures: rotting, wounded, seemingly smiling watermelon wedges resting on a plinth whose pink flesh resembled gums and growing teeth, tongues and ribs; "edibles-as-people" portraits (e.g., Fruit Face, 2015); and lumpy topiary busts of George Washington. Artforum stated, "Hegarty is drawn to this country’s damaged history, its warped psyche. Her watermelons are the stuff of colonialism, racist stereotyping, US avarice, and gluttony. Her fruits aren’t juicy, they’re bleeding—a lacerated bounty … reinforcing our sense of distance between the idealism of the American past and its sad, corrosive present."

The New York Times described the exhibition "Bloom & Gloom" (2018) as a "dark show" whose illusionistic reliefs, sculptures and wall works found beauty and wonder amid an intimate, dystopian vision of cracked, peeled, crumbling or rotting walls (e.g., Eastern Parkway/Brooklyn Museum (My Subway Stop); Boarded Up Window, Brooklyn) and dying flowers. In 2021, Hegarty took a similar approach in an installation in Riverside Park, Fresh Start, which offered a large, decaying vanitas still-life painting of flowers leaning against a wall behind the bars of an Amtrak maintenance site, which burst with a three-dimensional tangle of roots, leaves and blossoms spilling onto the floor.

== Awards and public collections ==
Hegarty has received awards from the Adolph and Esther Gottlieb Foundation (2022), New York Foundation for the Arts (2009, 2017), Pollock-Krasner Foundation (2010, 2016), Elizabeth Foundation for the Arts (2016), Rema Hort Mann Foundation (2004), Louis Comfort Tiffany Foundation (2003), Bronx Museum of Art (2003), and Illinois Arts Council (2002, 2000), among others. She has been awarded residencies by the Andrew W. Mellon Foundation, Lower Manhattan Cultural Council (LMCC), MacDowell Colony, Sharpe-Walentas Studio Program, Smack Mellon, and Yaddo, among others.

Her work belongs to the permanent collections of the Brooklyn Museum, Boca Raton Museum of Art, Cahoon Museum of American Art, Hudson River Museum, Hood Museum of Art, New Britain Museum of American Art, Peabody Essex Museum, Perez Art Museum, Portland Museum of Art, Rhode Island School of Design Museum, Saatchi Collection, Tang Museum, and the Wadsworth Atheneum Museum of Art, among others.
