= House-Museum of Tahir Salahov =

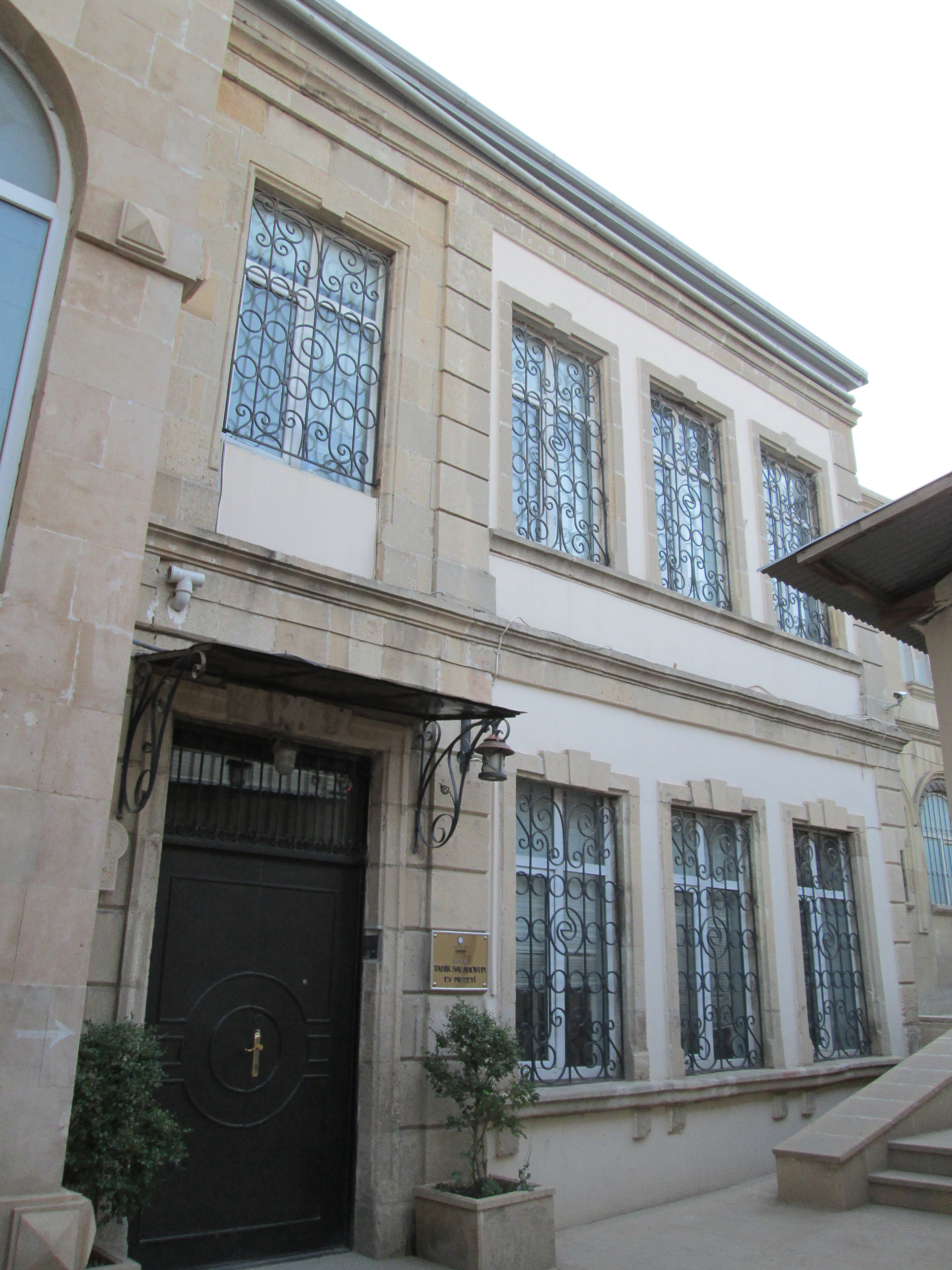
- Facade of museum
- Established: 2012
- Location: Ilyas Afandiyev street, Baku, Azerbaijan
- Coordinates: 40°21′58″N 49°50′04″E

Tahir Salahov's house-museum – Memorial museum of Azerbaijani artist, Hero of Socialist Labor, USSR and Azerbaijan State Prize laureate, People's Artist of the USSR, Professor Tahir Salahov. The museum is located in Ilyas Afandiyev Street, close to "Icherisheher" State Historical-Architectural Reserve.

== History ==
On 13 October 2011, President of Azerbaijan Ilham Aliyev signed an order to establish Tahir Salahov's House Museum in Baku.

The museum was created by the Icherisheher State Historical-Architectural Reserve Department in 2012.

== Exposition ==
The museum exposition is dedicated to the life and activity of the Azerbaijani artist Tahir Salahov. The artist gifted 735 exhibits to the house-museum. In general, the museum's collection includes 798 exhibits.

The exhibition presents portraits of Tahir Salakhov's contemporaries, such as Gara Garayev, Fikret Amirov and many others.

Among them there are his paintings, personal belongings, carpet collection and photo archive.

The exposition covers 3 floors of the museum building.

Tahir Salahov's workshop is located on the 3rd floor of the museum.
