= The Defenders of Fort Moultrie =

Monument in Charleston, South Carolina, US

Coordinates: 32°46′11″N 79°55′46″W

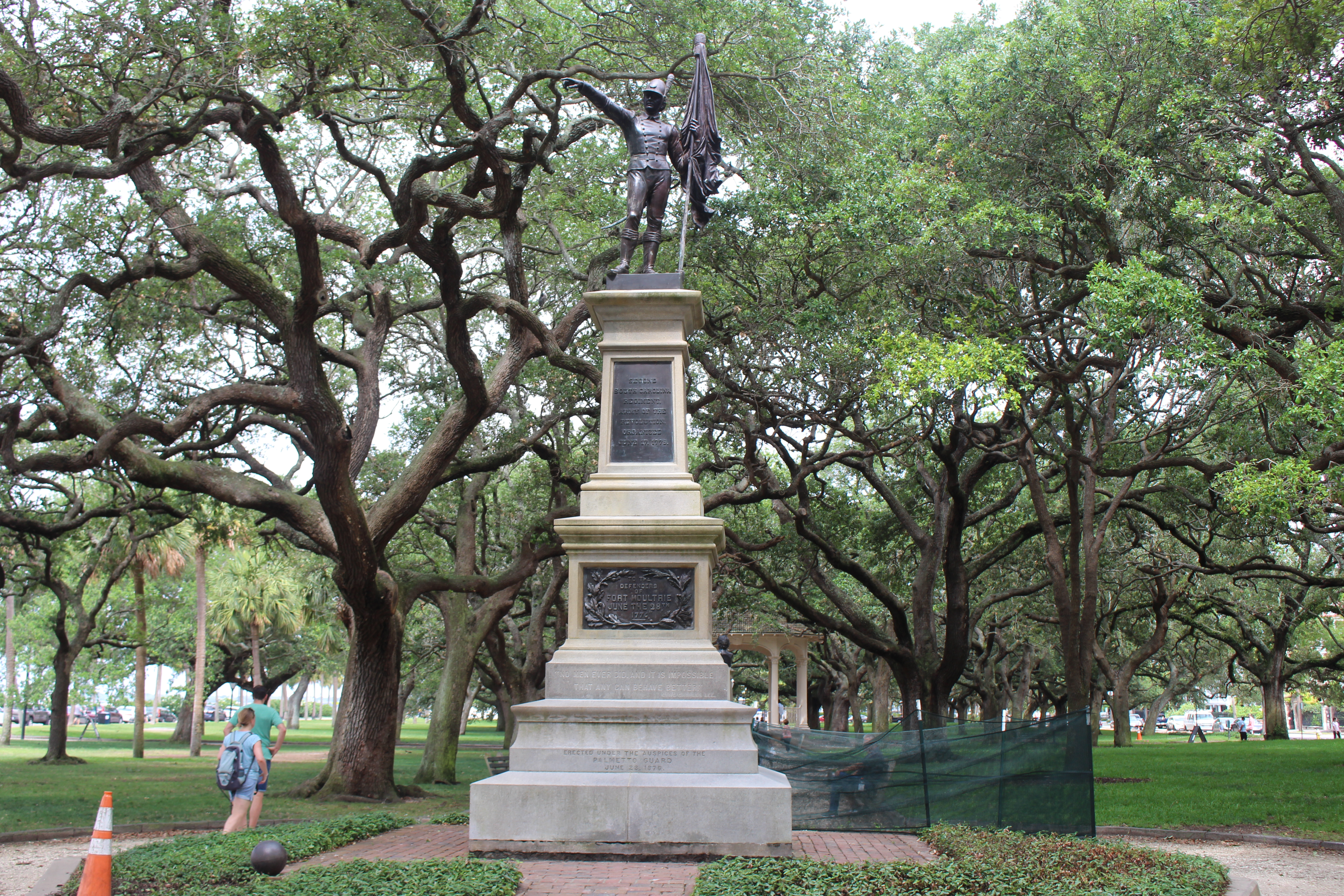
- The Defenders of Fort Moultrie (2019)
- Interactive map of The Defenders of Fort Moultrie
- Location: White Point Garden, Charleston, South Carolina, United States
- Height: 21.5 feet (6.6 m)
- Dedicated date: June 28, 1877
- Dedicated to: South Carolina militiamen involved in the Battle of Sullivan's Island

The Defenders of Fort Moultrie, also commonly known as the Jasper Monument, is a monument in Charleston, South Carolina, United States. Located in White Point Garden, the monument depicts Sergeant William Jasper and was dedicated in 1877 to all South Carolina militiamen involved in the Battle of Sullivan's Island during the American Revolutionary War.

== History ==
The Battle of Sullivan's Island was a 1776 battle in the American Revolutionary War that took place near Charleston, South Carolina. During the battle, the flagpole holding the regimental colors was destroyed by enemy gunfire, and Sergeant William Jasper climbed the ramparts while under enemy fire and held up the flag until it could be reattached. Following the battle, a victory for the Continental Army, Jasper was commended for his heroic actions by both his superiors, including President of South Carolina John Rutledge. The battle itself was considered a "Bunker Hill of the South."

Around the centennial of this event, plans were underway to create a monument to honor the South Carolinians involved in the battle. By the battle's centennial on June 28, 1876, the large granite base of the monument had been installed, with the bronze statue of Jasper being added by next year. The Palmetto Guard, a military company in Charleston, held the dedication ceremonies on June 28, 1877, first travelling to nearby Middleton Place before returning to the city for the dedication. The name for the monument, The Defenders of Fort Moultrie, is anachronistic, as the fort at the time of the battle was known as Fort Sullivan.

== Design ==
The monument consists of a bronze sculpture of Jasper upon a granite pedestal. The sculpture depicts the Continental soldier with his right arm outstretched, pointing towards Fort Moultrie, with the Moultrie flag in his left hand. Bronze plates are attached to the pedestal and show the Seal of South Carolina, the seal of Charleston, and a battle scene showing Jasper's rescue of the flag. Additional inscriptions are found on the granite base, and the plate in the front says:

TO THE DEFENDERS OF FORT MOULTRIE JUNE THE 28TH, 1776

The base is 15 feet (4.6 m) high and the statue is 6.5 feet (2.0 m) high.

== Bibliography ==
- Fulton, Linda De K. (April–September 1900). "Memorials of the American Revolution". The Chautauquan. XXXI – via Google Books.
- Morgan, Hazel (March 21, 2018). "Monuments in Battery Park in Charleston". USA Today. Gannett. Archived from the original on October 21, 2020.
- Guide to Charleston. Walker, Evans & Cogswell. 1884 – via Google Books.
- Young, John R. (2010). A Walk in the Parks. Evening Post Publishing Company. ISBN 978-0-9825154-4-0 – via Google Books.
