= Tahir Salahov =

Soviet and Azerbaijani artist (1928–2021)

Tahir Salahov L.d'H.O
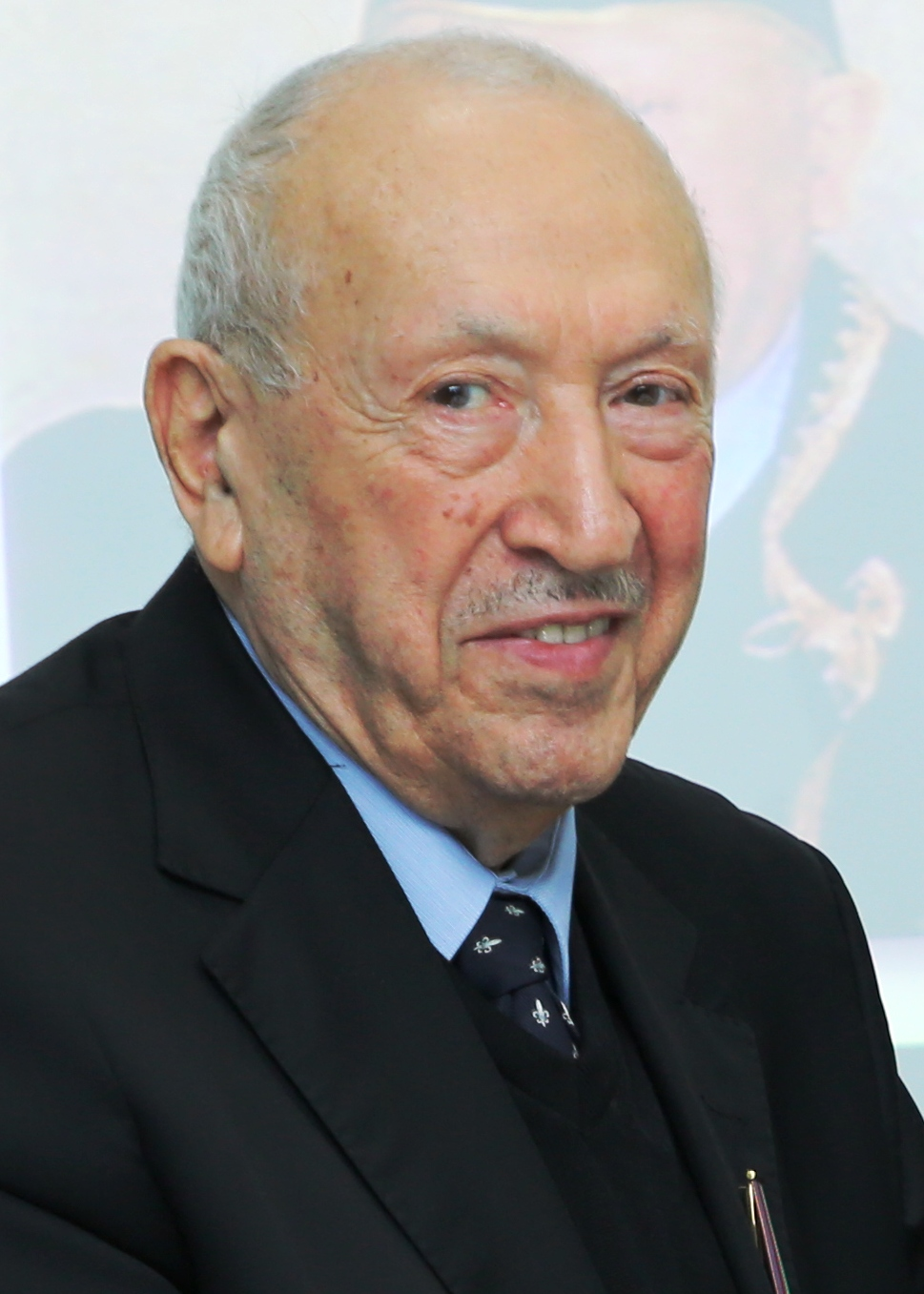
- Salahov in 2018
- Born: Tahir Teymur oğlu Salahov; 29 November 1928; Baku, Azerbaijan SSR, Soviet Union
- Died: 21 May 2021 (aged 92); Berlin, Germany
- Movement: Realism

Tahir Salahov (Azerbaijani: Tahir Teymur oğlu Salahov; Russian: Таир Теймур Салахов; 29 November 1928 – 21 May 2021) was a Soviet and Azerbaijani painter and draughtsman. He was First Secretary of the Artists' Union of the USSR (1973–1992), Vice-President of the Russian Academy of Arts, member of over 20 academies and other creative organizations throughout the world, including the academies of art of France, Spain, Germany, and Austria. He was awarded the honorary titles People's Artist of the USSR (1973), and People's Artist of the Azerbaijan SSR.

== Biography ==
Salahov was born in Baku. His father Teymur Salahov was a victim of Stalin's repressions, having been arrested in 1937 and executed shortly after. His mother Sona was left to bring up four children on her own, but the family did not learn of their father's death until 1956 after Stalin's death.

Tahir Salahov studied at the Azimzade Art College in Baku in 1945–1950 and the Surikov Moscow Art Institute in 1951–1957. Salahov won an early recognition: his diploma work, The Shift is Over, was exhibited in 1957 at the Moscow All-Union Art Exhibition and received public and critical acclaim. He became one of the leading representatives of the so-called "severe style" (Russian: "суровый стиль"), a trend in Soviet art of the 1960s that aimed to set off a hard, publicist, realist view against the ceremonial "polished reality" of the Joseph Stalin era. Salahov's compositions on the life and work of the Baku oil-workers (e.g. "Repair Men", 1961, Mustafayev Azerbaijan State Museum of Art, Baku) and portraits, e.g., his portrait of Azerbaijani composer Gara Garayev (1960, Tretyakov Gallery, Moscow), and Soviet composer Dmitri Shostakovich (1976, Tretyakov Gallery, Moscow), are characterized by a forcefulness and lack of idealization. Salahov chose a sparing palette of contrasting red, black, light- and dark-grey tones and gave colored plains a decorative function.

His later works are more peaceful and lyrically contemplative, and Eastern influences are more apparent, as in Portrait of Grandson Dan (1983, Azerbaijan State Museum of Art), in which the composition and colouring are subordinate to the flowing rhythms of Eastern medieval miniatures. His lines became smoother and more melodious, his palette more sophisticated. Many of his most successful works are associated with his impressions of foreign countries (e.g., Mexican Corrida; 1969, Mustafayev Azerbaijan State Museum of Art). He also produced expressive drawings and stage designs. In 1998, Salahov was appointed an Academician of the National Academy of Arts of the Kyrgyz Republic, alongside fellow artists Durdy Bayramov, Suhrob Kurbanov, Turgunbai Sadykov, and Erbolat Tolepbai.

== Awards ==
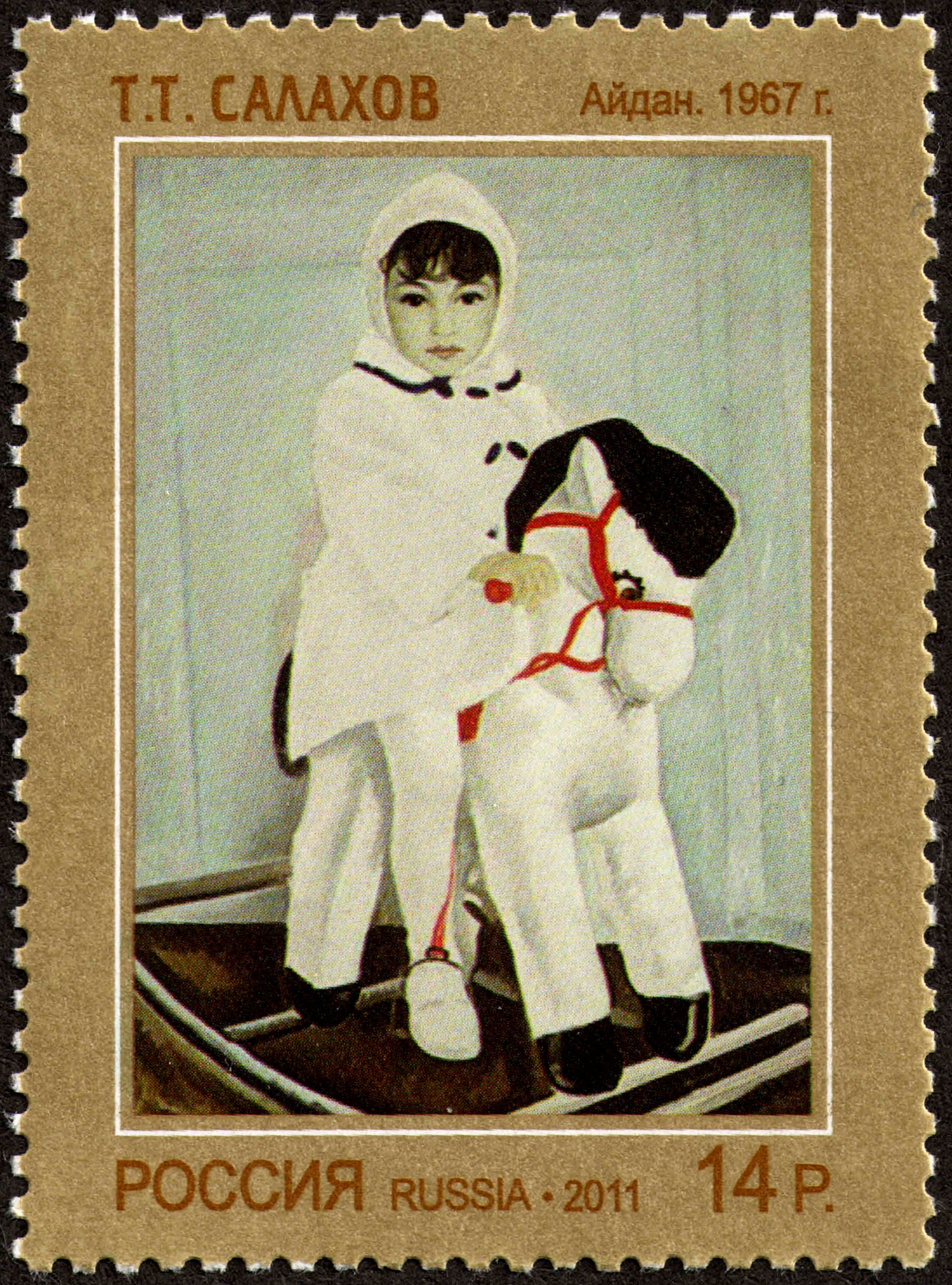
Salahov's painting Aidan (1967) on a 2011 stamp of Russia

- Hero of Socialist Labour (1989)
- Order "For Merit to the Fatherland", 2nd class (2003)
- Order "For Merit to the Fatherland", 3rd class (1998)
- Order of Lenin (1989)
- Order of the October Revolution (1976)
- Order of the Red Banner of Labour (1971)
- Order of Friendship of Peoples (1982)
- People's Artist of the USSR (visual arts) (1973)
- USSR State Prize (1968 – for the portrait of composer Gara Garayev)

== See also ==
- House-Museum of Tahir Salahov
