= List of television stations in Montana =

This is a list of broadcast television stations that are licensed in the U.S. state of Montana.

== Full-power ==
- Stations are arranged by media market served and channel position.

Full-power television stations in Montana
Media market	Station	Channel	Primary affiliation(s)	Notes	Refs
Billings	KTVQ	2	CBS, Independent on 2.2		
Billings	KHMT	4	Fox	(Note: Licensed to Hardin, Montana.)	
Billings	KSVI	6	ABC, The CW on 6.2		
Billings	KULR-TV	8	NBC		
Billings	KBGS-TV	16	PBS	(Note: Satellite of KUSM-TV.)	
Bozeman	KBZK	7	CBS, Independent on 7.2	(Note: Semi-satellite of KXLF-TV.)	
Bozeman	KUSM-TV	9	PBS		
Butte	KXLF-TV	4	CBS, Independent on 4.2		
Butte	KTVM-TV	6	NBC	(Note: Semi-satellite of KECI-TV.)	
Butte	KWYB	18	ABC, Fox on 18.2		
Glendive	KXGN-TV	5	PBS		
Great Falls	KRTV	3	CBS, Independent on 3.2		
Great Falls	KFBB-TV	5	ABC, Fox on 5.2		
Great Falls	KJJC-TV	16	MeTV		
Great Falls	KUGF-TV	21	PBS		
Helena	KUHM-TV	10	PBS		
Helena	KTVH-DT	12	NBC, Independent on 12.2		
Kalispell	KCFW-TV	9	NBC		
Kalispell	KUKL-TV	46	PBS		
Miles City	KYUS-TV	3	PBS		
Missoula	KPAX-TV	8	CBS, Independent on 8.2		
Missoula	KUFM-TV	11	PBS		
Missoula	KECI-TV	13	NBC		
Missoula	KTMF	23	ABC, Fox on 23.2		

== Low-power ==
Low-power television stations in Montana
Media market	Station	Channel	Primary affiliation(s)	Notes	Refs
Billings	KHKR-LD	14	MeTV		
Billings	KQHD-LD	43	Retro TV		
Billings	K19LB-D	45	IBN Television		
Billings	K31NN-D	51	[Blank]		
Bozeman	KOOG-LD	15	[Blank]		
Butte	K36OS-D	36	PBS (PBS West)	(Note: Licensed to Whitehall, Montana.)	
Butte	K34NR-D	39	IBN Television		
Glasgow	K16AZ-D	16	Various		
Glasgow	K18BN-D	18	Various		
Glasgow	K20JS-D	20	Various		
Glasgow	K24MV-D	41	Various	(Note: Licensed to Fort Peck, Montana.)	
Great Falls	K25LM-D	25	Silent		
Great Falls	K35KC-D	35	Silent		
Helena	KOOH-LD	17	[Blank]		
Helena	K22OH-D	22	[Blank]		
Kalispell	K25KZ-D	25	IBN Television		
Kalispell	K26DD-D	26	TBN		
Kalispell	KMJD-LD	34	Antenna TV		
Troy	K26LM-D	3	Various	(Note: Licensed to Libby, Montana.)	
Missoula	K25LO-D	25	[Blank]	(Note: Licensed to Hamilton, Montana.)	
Toole County	K28KO-D	28	[Blank]	(Note: Licensed to Sweetgrass, Montana.)	
Toole County	K32NN-D	38	[Blank]	(Note: Licensed to Joplin, Montana.)	
White Sulfur Springs	K26LQ-D	26	PBS (PBS West)		
Wolf Point	K13FP-D	6	Movies!, Independent on 6.3		

== Translators ==
Television station translators in Montana
Media market	Station	Channel	Translating	Notes	Refs
Billings	K24GD-D	2	KTVQ		
Billings	K26GL-D	2	KTVQ	(Note: Licensed to Columbus, Montana.)	
Billings	K35PL-D	2	KTVQ	(Note: Licensed to Roundup, Montana.)	
Billings	K27IM-D	4	KHMT		
Billings	K34QX-D	4	KHMT		
Billings	K07WP-D	6	KSVI		
Billings	K16DZ-D	6	KSVI		
Billings	K25BP-D	6	KSVI		
Billings	K33EA-D	6	KSVI		
Billings	K24FL-D	8	KULR-TV		
Billings	K31PY-D	8	KULR-TV		
Billings	K20HB-D	20	KBGS-TV		
Bozeman	K17JP-D	2	KTVQ	(Note: Licensed to Big Timber, Montana.)	
Bozeman	K10AH-D	2	KTVQ	(Note: Licensed to Emigrant, Montana.)	
Bozeman	K34PL-D	2	KTVQ	(Note: Licensed to Livingston, Montana.)	
Bozeman	K19JM-D	4	KHMT		
Bozeman	K32MS-D	4	KHMT		
Bozeman	K23LW-D	6	KSVI		
Bozeman	KDBZ-CD	6	KTVM-TV		
Bozeman	K26DE-D	7	KBZK		
Bozeman	K36PI-D	7	KBZK		
Bozeman	K21MA-D	8	KULR-TV		
Bozeman	K17KB-D	9	KUSM-TV	(Note: Licensed to Belgrade, Montana.)	
Bozeman	K27LO-D	9	KUSM-TV		
Bozeman	KWYB-LD	28	KWYB		
Bozeman	K20KQ-D	28	KWYB-LD		
Bridger	K15LB-D	2	KTVQ	(Note: Licensed to Red Lodge, Montana.)	
Bridger	K28LG-D	2	KTVQ		
Bridger	K33LG-D	4	KHMT		
Bridger	K31LE-D	6	KSVI		
Bridger	K35JW-D	8	KULR-TV		
Bridger	K26NN-D	16	KBGS-TV		
Butte	K07OC-D	4	KXLF-TV	(Note: Licensed to Polaris, Montana.)	
Butte	K08KT-D	4	KXLF-TV	(Note: Licensed to Boulder, Montana.)	
Butte	K09BG-D	4	KXLF-TV	(Note: Licensed to Basin, Montana.)	
Butte	K09MY-D	6	KTVM-TV		
Butte	K10HL-D	6	KTVM-TV	(Note: Licensed to Virginia City, Montana.)	
Butte	K11LA-D	6	KTVM-TV		
Butte	K13KP-D	6	KTVM-TV		
Butte	K25OA-D	6	KTVM-TV	(Note: Licensed to Dillon, Montana.)	
Butte	K24MP-D	9	KUSM-TV		
Butte	K27CD-D	9	KUSM-TV		
Butte	K26ON-D	18	KWYB	(Note: Licensed to Deer Lodge, Montana.)	
Butte	K33OV-D	36	K36OS-D		
Butte	K36CX-D	49	KUSM-TV		
Glasgow	K09HY-D	3	KRTV		
Glasgow	K10JK-D	3	KRTV	(Note: Licensed to Hinsdale, Montana.)	
Glasgow	K22MN-D	3	KRTV		
Glasgow	K30LC-D	3	KRTV	(Note: Licensed to Tampico, Montana.)	
Glasgow	K07JG-D	5	KFBB-TV		
Glasgow	K31NS-D	5	KFBB-TV		
Glasgow	K32JU-D	5	KFBB-TV		
Glasgow	K35NF-D	5	KFBB-TV		
Glasgow	K07DI-D	8	KUMV-TV		
Glasgow	K11IA-D	8	KUMV-TV		
Glasgow	K26NS-D	8	KUMV-TV		
Glasgow	K36OC-D	14	KUSM-TV		
Glasgow	K14AR-D	14	K36OC-D		
Glasgow	K22MJ-D	14	K36OC-D		
Glasgow	K34NA-D	14	K36OC-D		
Glasgow	K13JO-D	16	K16AZ-D		
Glasgow	K05IZ-D	18	K18BN-D		
Glasgow	K33ON-D	20	K20JS-D		
Glendive	K09HI-D	2	KTVQ	(Note: Licensed to Jordan, Montana.)	
Glendive	K13HK-D	4	KHMT	(Note: Licensed to Sand Springs, Montana.)	
Glendive	K07VA-D	5	KFBB-TV		
Glendive	K14AG-D	5	KFBB-TV	(Note: Licensed to Circle, Montana.)	
Glendive	K13LN-D	5	KXGN-TV	(Note: Licensed to Ekalaka, Montana.)	
Glendive	K27LT-D	5	KXGN-TV	(Note: Licensed to Baker, Montana.)	
Glendive	K03HD-D	5	KXGN-TV	(Note: Licensed to Plevna, Montana.)	
Glendive	K16GP-D	5	KXGN-TV		
Glendive	703604	5	KXGN-TV	(Note: Licensed to Terry, Montana.)	
Glendive	K13OW-D	7	KQCD-TV		
Glendive	K13WT-D	7	KQCD-TV		
Glendive	K04IH-D	9	KDSE		
Glendive	K17OB-D	9	KDSE		
Glendive	K18CR-D	9	KUSM-TV		
Glendive	K23DJ-D	9	KUSM-TV		
Glendive	K34DP-D	9	KUSM-TV		
Glendive	K07EQ-D	10	KQME		
Glendive	K08IP-D	10	KQME		
Glendive	K09IV-D	10	KQME		
Glendive	K24DD-D	10	KQME		
Glendive	K09BE-D	11	KHSD-TV		
Glendive	K11HE-D	12	KTVH-DT		
Great Falls	K09ZB-D	3	KRTV	(Note: Licensed to Havre, Montana.)	
Great Falls	K10FC-D	3	KRTV	(Note: Licensed to Dodson, Montana.)	
Great Falls	K12FB-D	3	KRTV	(Note: Licensed to Saco, Montana.)	
Great Falls	K11GX-D	3	KRTV	(Note: Licensed to Whitewater, Montana.)	
Great Falls	K11WK-D	3	KRTV	(Note: Licensed to Stanford, Montana.)	
Great Falls	K12RE-D	3	KRTV	(Note: Licensed to Denton, Montana.)	
Great Falls	K13OU-D	3	KRTV	(Note: Licensed to Chinook, Montana.)	
Great Falls	K13GP-D	3	KRTV	(Note: Licensed to Malta, Montana.)	
Great Falls	K15LD-D	3	KRTV	(Note: Licensed to Lewistown, Montana.)	
Great Falls	K19JQ-D	3	KRTV	(Note: Licensed to Big Sandy, Montana.)	
Great Falls	K24MN-D	3	KRTV	(Note: Licensed to Phillips County, Montana.)	
Great Falls	703493	3	KRTV	(Note: Licensed to Loma, Montana.)	
Great Falls	K07IB-D	4	KHMT		
Great Falls	K08FS-D	4	KHMT		
Great Falls	K11IH-D	4	KHMT		
Great Falls	K17KU-D	4	KHMT		
Great Falls	K28MK-D	4	KHMT		
Great Falls	K07IC-D	5	KFBB-TV		
Great Falls	K09BX-D	5	KFBB-TV		
Great Falls	K10BK-D	5	KFBB-TV		
Great Falls	K10RC-D	5	KFBB-TV		
Great Falls	K12GP-D	5	KFBB-TV		
Great Falls	K13DU-D	5	KFBB-TV		
Great Falls	K24KU-D	5	KFBB-TV		
Great Falls	K26LG-D	5	KFBB-TV		
Great Falls	K36PB-D	5	KFBB-TV		
Great Falls	703496	5	KFBB-TV		
Great Falls	K22LD-D	9	KUSM-TV		
Great Falls	K09JG-D	12	KTVH-DT		
Great Falls	K15AS-D	12	KTVH-DT		
Great Falls	K20BP-D	12	KTVH-DT		
Great Falls	K34DN-D	12	KTVH-DT		
Great Falls	K36CW-D	12	KTVH-DT		
Great Falls	K13OQ-D	21	KUGF-TV		
Great Falls	KTGF-LD	50	KTVH-DT		
Great Falls	K18KT-D	12	KTVH-DT		
Harlowton	K06QN-D	2	KTVQ	(Note: Licensed to Judith Gap, Montana.)	
Harlowton	K09YR-D	2	KTVQ		
Harlowton	K19JO-D	2	KTVQ		
Harlowton	K17KZ-D	4	KHMT		
Harlowton	K04RT-D	6	KSVI		
Harlowton	K07ZR-D	6	KSVI		
Harlowton	K09LW-D	6	KSVI	(Note: Licensed to Martinsdale, Montana.)	
Harlowton	K15JA-D	6	KSVI		
Harlowton	K13BE-D	8	KULR-TV		
Helena	KJJC-LD	7	KJJC-TV		
Helena	K33OP-D	9	KUSM-TV		
Helena	KXLH-LD	9	KXLF-TV		
Helena	KHBB-LD	21	KFBB-TV		
Kalispell	K35NB-D	2; 4; 7; 28	KREM; KXLY-TV; KSPS-TV; KAYU-TV	(Note: Licensed to Polson, Montana.)	
Kalispell	K29LQ-D	2; 4; 7; 28	K35NB-D		
Kalispell	K28OG-D	2	KREM		
Kalispell	K03DJ-D	4	KXLY-TV		
Kalispell	K30PT-D	4	KXLY-TV		
Kalispell	K21KA-D	7; 11	KSPS-TV; KUFM-TV	(Note: Licensed to Ferndale, Montana.)	
Kalispell	K08PQ-D	7	KSPS-TV	(Note: Licensed to Big Arm, Montana.)	
Kalispell	K11KE-D	7	KSPS-TV	(Note: Licensed to Woods Bay, Montana.)	
Kalispell	K32HH-D	7	KSPS-TV		
Kalispell	K11HO-D	8	KPAX-TV		
Kalispell	K11IL-D	8	KPAX-TV	(Note: Licensed to Bitterroot Range, Montana.)	
Kalispell	K22MG-D	8	KPAX-TV		
Kalispell	K12LO-D	8	KPAX-TV		
Kalispell	K02AO-D	9	KCFW-TV	(Note: Licensed to Eureka, Montana.)	
Kalispell	K05FC-D	9	KCFW-TV	(Note: Licensed to Lake McDonald, Montana.)	
Kalispell	K24ID-D	9	KCFW-TV		
Kalispell	K14NJ-D	11	KUFM-TV	(Note: Licensed to Hot Springs, Montana.)	
Kalispell	K17NE-D	11	KUFM-TV	(Note: Licensed to Arlee, Montana.)	
Kalispell	K27MS-D	11	KUFM-TV	(Note: Licensed to Pablo, Montana.)	
Kalispell	K29ND-D	11	KUFM-TV		
Kalispell	K33OH-D	11	KUFM-TV		
Kalispell	K33OR-D	11	KUFM-TV	(Note: Licensed to St. Ignatius, Montana.)	
Kalispell	K05AH-D	13	KECI-TV		
Kalispell	K16GJ-D	13	KECI-TV		
Kalispell	KAJJ-CD	18	KPAX-TV		
Kalispell	K03IA-D	18	KAJJ-CD		
Kalispell	K10LH-D	18	KAJJ-CD	(Note: Licensed to West Glacier, Montana.)	
Kalispell	K07EN-D	23	KTMF		
Kalispell	K14LT-D	23	KTMF		
Kalispell	K16NF-D	23	KTMF		
Kalispell	K19GD-D	23	KTMF		
Kalispell	K31PD-D	23	KTMF	(Note: Licensed to Whitefish, Montana.)	
Kalispell	K36KR-D	23	KTMF		
Kalispell	K02RJ-D	28	KAYU-TV		
Kalispell	K05NE-D	28	KAYU-TV		
Kalispell	K05MW-D	34	KMJD-LD		
Kalispell	K07IT-D	42	KTMF		
Kalispell	K14NI-D	42	KTMF		
Kalispell	KTMF-LD	42	KTMF		
Kalispell	K12LU-D	46	KUKL-TV		
Kalispell	KEXI-LD	46	KUKL-TV		
Missoula	K08PR-D	7	KSPS-TV		
Missoula	K03IA-D	8	KPAX-TV	(Note: Licensed to Sula, Montana.)	
Missoula	K11FF-D	8	KPAX-TV	(Note: Licensed to Superior, Montana.)	
Missoula	K17JS-D	8	KPAX-TV	(Note: Licensed to Philipsburg, Montana.)	
Missoula	K20KL-D	8	KPAX-TV	(Note: Licensed to Drummond, Montana.)	
Missoula	K15KW-D	11	KUFM-TV		
Missoula	K22MI-D	11	KUFM-TV		
Missoula	K03DT-D	13	KECI-TV		
Missoula	K05ML-D	13	KECI-TV		
Missoula	K14IU-D	13	KECI-TV	(Note: Licensed to Frenchtown, Montana.)	
Missoula	K26KA-D	13	KECI-TV		
Missoula	K25LF-D	13	KECI-TV		
Missoula	K09YT-D	23	KTMF		
Missoula	K30KY-D	23	KTMF		
Missoula	K35JT-D	23	KTMF		
Plains	K07CH-D	4	KXLY-TV		
Plains	K05GM-D	8	KPAX-TV		
Plains	K29ID-D	9	KCFW-TV	(Note: Licensed to Weeksville, Montana.)	
Plains	K08OY-D	11	KUFM-TV		
Plains	K21CA-D	11	KUFM-TV		
Plains	K31KQ-D	11	KUFM-TV		
Plains	K34PQ-D	11	KUFM-TV		
Plains	K11JP-D	13	KECI-TV		
Poplar	K13PZ-D	4	KWSE		
Poplar	K26PD-D	4	KWSE	(Note: Licensed to Scobey, Montana.)	
Poplar	K05KK-D	5	KXGN-TV		
Poplar	K31MJ-D	5	KXGN-TV	(Note: Licensed to Four Buttes, Montana.)	
Poplar	K03DP-D	8	KUMV-TV		
Poplar	K15KR-D	8	KUMV-TV		
Poplar	K22KY-D	11	KXMD-TV		
Poplar	K17MS-D	9; 17	KUSM-TV; KFBB-TV; KXGN-TV		
Poplar	K34GY-D	9; 17	K17MS-D	(Note: Licensed to Culbertson, Montana.)	
Poplar	K13MA-D	5	KXGN-TV		
Southeast Montana	K08JV-D	2	KTVQ	(Note: Licensed to Broadus, Montana.)	
Southeast Montana	K08OW-D	2	KTVQ	(Note: Licensed to Hysham, Montana.)	
Southeast Montana	K08PP-D	2	KTVQ	(Note: Licensed to Rosebud, Montana.)	
Southeast Montana	K09VL-D	2	KTVQ	(Note: Licensed to Boyes, Montana.)	
Southeast Montana	K10GF-D	2	KTVQ	(Note: Licensed to Miles City, Montana.)	
Southeast Montana	K12RA-D	2	KTVQ	(Note: Licensed to Colstrip, Montana.)	
Southeast Montana	K16MY-D	2	KTVQ	(Note: Licensed to Ashland, Montana.)	
Southeast Montana	K16NE-D	2	KTVQ	(Note: Licensed to Forsyth, Montana.)	
Southeast Montana	K22NN-D	2	KTVQ		
Southeast Montana	K28ON-D	2	KTVQ	(Note: Licensed to Castle Rock, Montana.)	
Southeast Montana	K36PJ-D	2	KTVQ	(Note: Licensed to Howard, Montana.)	
Southeast Montana	K18MZ-D	4	KHMT		
Southeast Montana	K19FF-D	4	KHMT		
Southeast Montana	K20LK-D	4	KHMT		
Southeast Montana	K16DH-D	6	KSVI		
Southeast Montana	K07WJ-D	6	KSVI		
Southeast Montana	K24KM-D	6	KSVI		
Southeast Montana	K32MN-D	6	KSVI		
Southeast Montana	K06AA-D	8	KULR-TV		
Southeast Montana	K06FD-D	8	KULR-TV		
Southeast Montana	K09OY-D	8	KULR-TV		
Southeast Montana	K10AC-D	8	KULR-TV		
Southeast Montana	K10QZ-D	8	KULR-TV		
Southeast Montana	K13PO-D	8	KULR-TV		
Southeast Montana	K14RV-D	8	KULR-TV		
Southeast Montana	K26OX-D	8	KULR-TV		
Southeast Montana	K31NW-D	8	KULR-TV		
Southeast Montana	K33MC-D	8	KULR-TV		
Southeast Montana	K34OB-D	8	KULR-TV		
Southeast Montana	K14RX-D	11	KHSD-TV		
Southeast Montana	K18JE-D	11	KHSD-TV		
Southeast Montana	K03CS-D	12	KSGW-TV		
Thompson Falls	K06QF-D	4	KXLY-TV	(Note: Licensed to Heron, Montana.)	
Thompson Falls	K10QH-D	4	KXLY-TV	(Note: Licensed to Trout Creek, Montana.)	
Thompson Falls	K36BW-D	4	KXLY-TV; KSPS-TV		
Thompson Falls	K04QV-D	4	K36BW-D		
Thompson Falls	K09FQ-D	4	K36BW-D		
Thompson Falls	K07FL-D	8	KPAX-TV		
Thompson Falls	K08OZ-D	8	KPAX-TV		
Thompson Falls	K17MQ-D	8	KPAX-TV		
Thompson Falls	K13ZN-D	11	KUFM-TV		
Thompson Falls	K23NP-D	11	KUFM-TV		
Thompson Falls	K11FQ-D	13	KECI-TV		
Thompson Falls	K12QT-D	13	KECI-TV		
Thompson Falls	K25OS-D	13	KECI-TV		
Thompson Falls	K21MW-D	23	KTMF		
Thompson Falls	K15IY-D	23	KTMF		
Toole County	K11WQ-D	3	KRTV	(Note: Licensed to West Knees, Montana.)	
Toole County	K18KM-D	3	KRTV	(Note: Licensed to Conrad, Montana.)	
Toole County	K25NJ-D	3	KRTV		
Toole County	K27JW-D	3	KRTV		
Toole County	K23LX-D	5	KFBB-TV		
Toole County	K34PM-D	5	KFBB-TV		
Toole County	K36DK-D	7	CISA-DT		
Toole County	K25MZ-D	12	KTVH-DT		
Toole County	K30MW-D	12	KTVH-DT		
Toole County	K33PR-D	12	KTVH-DT		
Toole County	K16KB-D	21	KUGF-TV		
Toole County	K35OF-D	21	KUSM-TV		
Townsend	K13KH-D	9	KXLH-LD		
Townsend	K11WM-D	10	KUHM-TV		
Townsend	K04QX-D	12	KTVH-DT		
Townsend	K07EJ-D	21	KHBB-LD		
Troy	K08BG-D	2	KREM		
Troy	K07ZP-D	2	KREM	(Note: Licensed to Bull Lake Valley, Montana.)	
Troy	K10AF-D	4	KXLY-TV		
Troy	K11KP-D	4	KXLY-TV		
Troy	K24KJ-D	4	KXLY-TV		
Troy	K13KV-D	6	KHQ-TV		
Troy	K30MJ-D	7	KSPS-TV		
Troy	K22KS-D	8	KPAX-TV		
Troy	K12AA-D	9	KCFW-TV		
Troy	K18KD-D	9	KCFW-TV		
Troy	K16KZ-D	23	KTMF	(Note: Licensed to Quartz Creek, Montana.)	
West Yellowstone	718545	6	KTVM-TV		
West Yellowstone	718543	7	KBZK		
West Yellowstone	718544	9	KUSM-TV		
West Yellowstone	718538	18	KWYB		
White Sulphur Springs	K09MH-D	2	KTVQ		
White Sulphur Springs	K11MP-D	6	KSVI		
White Sulphur Springs	K06NV-D	4	KHMT		
White Sulphur Springs	K07NU-D	8	KULR-TV		
White Sulphur Springs	K08LI-D	26	K26LQ-D		
Wolf Point	K19JR-D	3	KRTV		
Wolf Point	K25HO-D	5	KFBB-TV		
Wolf Point	K29FS-D	8	KUMV-TV		
Wolf Point	K27JQ-D	14	K36OC-D		
Wolf Point	K04GF-D	18	K18BN-D		
Wolf Point	K06AV-D	20	K20JS-D		

== Defunct ==
- KBAO Lewistown (2000–2008)
- KBBJ Havre (2000–2008)
- KBTZ Butte (2003–2009)
- KGEZ-TV/KULR Kalispell (1957–1958, 1958–1959)
- KLMN Great Falls (2003–2009)
- KMMF Missoula (2002–2009)
- KOPR-TV Butte (1953–1954)
