= Scripps Sports =

Sports broadcasting division of the E. W. Scripps Company

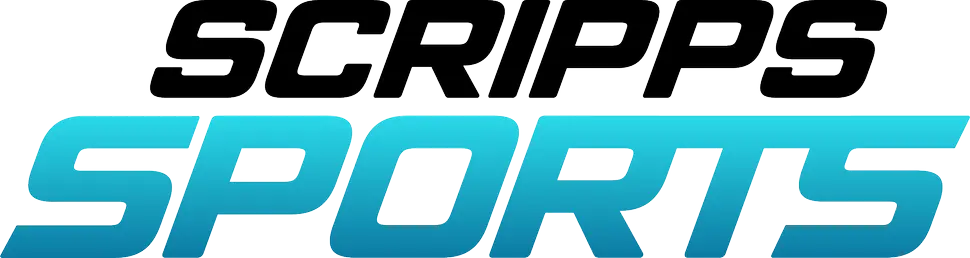
- Launched: December 15, 2022; 3 years ago
- Division of: E. W. Scripps Company
- Country of origin: United States
- Key people: Brian Lawlor (President)
- Major broadcasting contracts: WNBA; NWSL; Vegas Golden Knights (regional); Utah Mammoth (regional); Florida Panthers (regional); Tampa Bay Lightning (regional); Las Vegas Aces (regional); Nashville Predators (regional); Detroit Pistons (regional)
- Official website: scrippssports.com

Scripps Sports is the sports division of the E. W. Scripps Company; it is responsible for the broadcasting of sporting events across its broadcast television portfolio, including local stations and co-owned networks (such as Ion Television).

== History ==
Prior to the formation of Scripps Sports, in May 2022, The E.W. Scripps Company reached an agreement with the Big Sky Conference to air 14 conference football games and as many as eight women's or men's basketball games involving Montana State University and University of Montana on the Scripps owned Montana Television Network. In 2025, Scripps Sports and the Big Sky extended their agreement through the 2029–30 season.

The formation of Scripps Sports was announced in December 2022. Company president Adam P. Symson stated that the division planned to compete with regional sports networks to pursue local rights to professional sports teams for its stations, and pursue national broadcasting contracts for its Ion Media division (including Ion Television). He argued that the pay television RSN industry was an "old model" that is "not set up to move forward", and that "we are really well-situated to participate in future models with sports teams, leagues, and conferences."

In April 2023, Scripps Sports announced its first broadcast contract, a regular season package of Friday-night WNBA basketball games for Ion.

The following month, with AT&T SportsNet winding down, Scripps Sports reached an agreement for regional rights to the Vegas Golden Knights of the NHL. The games would be syndicated to stations within the team's designated market (with KMCC as flagship; the station moved Ion to a digital subchannel and became an independent station), and offered via the subscription-based over-the-top service KnightTime+. In October 2023, it also reached an agreement with the Arizona Coyotes, after Bally Sports Arizona rejected its contract with the team and subsequently shut down not long afterward. After initially airing on the Antenna TV-affiliated KNXV-DT2, KASW moved its The CW affiliation to that channel and similarly converted to an independent station to accommodate Coyotes games (Scripps would later relinquish its CW affiliation entirely, with majority owner Nexstar Media Group taking over KAZT-TV under a time brokerage agreement, and moving The CW to it in February 2024).

On November 9, 2023, the National Women's Soccer League announced Scripps Sports as a rightsholder beginning in the 2024 season, with Ion to air Saturday night doubleheaders. Ion also aired the 2024 NWSL Draft.

In April 2024, the NHL deactivated the Coyotes franchise, and their players and personnel were acquired by a new Salt Lake City-based expansion team owned by Ryan Smith. Scripps' KUPX-TV in Salt Lake City, which had been televising Coyotes and Golden Knights games, continued to carry the former's games, but now as the Utah Mammoth's flagship station. The team's telecasts are produced in-house by SEG Media, a unit of team owner Smith Entertainment Group that also produces Utah Jazz NBA games for KJZZ-TV via a similar arrangement.

In July 2024, the Florida Panthers announced a deal with Scripps Sports to move its games from Bally Sports Florida, with WSFL-TV in Miami as flagship station.

On August 18, 2024, Ion aired the finals of the Manhattan Beach Open beach volleyball tournament as part of a one-off deal with the Association of Volleyball Professionals.

In 2025, Scripps Sports began expanding the number of live sports on Ion. In April, Scripps announced a five-year agreement to broadcast the women's Fort Myers Tip-Off on Ion. Scripps also announced an agreement with Sports Illustrated to launch the SI Women's Games. The games will feature women, representing "Team America" and "Team World", competing in basketball, gymnastics, tennis, flag football, volleyball, and combat sports. In September 2025, Scripps announced a multi-year agreement with Athlos to air Athlos NYC and Athlos League. In November 2025, Scripps announced an agreement with Major League Volleyball to broadcast the leagues' semifinals and championship on Ion.

Scripps Sports also announced additional regional sports agreements in 2025. In March 2025, Scripps acquired the local rights to the WNBA's Las Vegas Aces, joining the Golden Knights on KMCC. In May, Scripps signed a deal with the NHL's Tampa Bay Lightning to carry their games on WXPX-TV, taking over the rights from FanDuel Sports Network Sun. In September, Scripps announced an agreement with the University of Hawaii to broadcast Hawaii Rainbow Warriors football on local stations in San Diego, Denver, Las Vegas, Phoenix, Salt Lake City, Tucson, Boise/Twin Falls, Bakersfield, San Luis Obispo, Great Falls/Helena/Billings and Butte/Bozeman.

Prior to the 2025–26 PWHL season, Scripps Sports announced that its local stations in Denver (KCDO), Detroit (WMYD), Las Vegas (KMCC) and Tampa (WXPX) would broadcast select regular season PWHL games. Mid-way through the season, Scripps announced that the PWHL Water Cup Finals and a regular season game in Detroit between the New York Sirens and Montréal Victoire would air nationally on Ion. The games on Ion marked the first time the PWHL would air on a national broadcast television network in the United States.

Also in 2025, Scripps began to rename its independent stations as The Spot, including several Scripps Sports affiliates. The brand had debuted in 2003 at KMCI-TV.

On March 24, 2026, Scripps launched the Scripps Sports Network, a free ad-supported streaming television (FAST) channel. Scripps announced expanded agreements to air 10 regular season PWHL games and 12 regular-season Major League Volleyball games, in addition to a new agreement with the National Arena League, on the network.

Scripps continued to announce additional broadcast rights in April 2026. Scripps announced an agreement with the Professional Bull Riders to broadcast Premier Women's Rodeo on Ion and Grit beginning with a limited 2026 schedule. In 2027, Scripps networks will air 18 hours of women's rodeo across 16 broadcasts.

On April 7, 2026, it was announced that the Nashville Predators would move to WNPX-TV under a multi-year deal with Scripps Sports, moving from FanDuel Sports Network South. On May 13, it was announced that the Detroit Pistons would move to WMYD under a multi-year deal with Scripps Sports, moving from FanDuel Sports Network Detroit. It will mark the first NBA team served by the division.

In July 2026, Scripps Sports secured the exclusive U.S. media rights to the 2027 FIVB Women's Volleyball World Cup, with all matches to be broadcast on ION and Scripps Sports platforms in English and Spanish.

In September 2026, following its partial deal, Scripps Sports announced an expanded agreement with the PWHL for the 2026–27 season; Ion will air a primetime "game of the week on Saturday nights, a playoff series, and the Walter Cup final, while Scripps Sports Network will also air two games per week. In addition, Scripps' WMYD in Detroit and KMCC in Las Vegas will broadcast the league's Detroit Clutch and Vegas Vanguards expansion teams respectively.

== Programs ==
=== Current national broadcast rights ===
- WNBA (2023–present)
  - Friday Night Spotlight; 15 weeks of regular season games per-season on Ion Television
- NWSL (2024–present)
  - Saturday Night Soccer; 25 weeks of regular season matches on Saturday nights per-season on Ion Television
  - All matches simulcast on Scripps Sports Network
  - 2024 NWSL Draft
- Athlos (2025–present)
  - Athlos NYC
  - Athlos League
- Women's Fort Myers Tip-Off (2025–present)
- Sports Illustrated Women's Games (2025–present)
  - Team Americas vs Team World
  - Featuring flag football, judo, wrestling, volleyball, gymnastics, basketball and tennis
- Professional Women's Hockey League (2025–present)
  - Select games broadcast locally in Denver (KCDO), Detroit (WMYD), Las Vegas (KMCC) and Tampa (WXPX)
  - 10 regular season games on Scripps Sports Network
  - 1 regular season game on Ion
  - PWHL Walter Cup Finals on Ion
- Major League Volleyball (2026–present)
  - 12 regular season matches on Scripps Sports Network
  - Semifinals and championship on Ion
- National Arena League (2026–present)
  - Select games on Scripps Sports Network
- UpShot League (2026–present)
  - 15 games on Scripps Sports Network
- Women's Pro Baseball League (2026–present)
  - 11 games on Scripps Sports Network
- Women's TMRW Golf League (2026–present)
  - Matches on Ion

=== Current regional broadcast rights ===
Team	League	Flagship station	Affiliates	OTT subscription outlet
Montana and Montana State (2022–present) (Football, Men's Basketball and Women's Basketball)	Big Sky Conference	Montana Television Network	KTVQ/Billings, Montana; KRTV/Great Falls, Montana; KXLH-LD/Helena, Montana; KXLF/Butte, Montana; KBZK/Bozeman, Montana; KPAX/Missoula, Montana; KAJJ-CD/Kalispell, Montana; KUPX-TV/Salt Lake City, Utah; KIVI-DT2/Boise, Idaho; KSAW-DT2/Twin Falls, Idaho; KASW/Phoenix, Arizona; KCDO-TV/Denver, Colorado; KWBA-TV/Tucson, Arizona	ESPN+
Florida Panthers (2024–present)	NHL	WSFL-TV/Miami, Florida	WHDT/Stuart, Florida; WFTX-DT3/Cape Coral, Florida	Panthers+ (in-market)
Utah Mammoth (2024–present)	NHL	KUPX-TV/Provo, Utah	KIVI-DT2/Boise, Idaho and KSAW-LD2/Twin Falls, Idaho; Montana Television Network DT2 subchannels; KWBA-TV/Tucson, Arizona; KASW/Phoenix, Arizona	Mammoth+ (in-market)
Vegas Golden Knights (2023–present)	NHL	KMCC/Laughlin, Nevada	KNSN-TV/Reno, Nevada; KIVI-DT2/Boise, Idaho and KSAW-LD2/Twin Falls, Idaho; Montana Television Network DT2 subchannels; KWBA-TV/Tucson, Arizona; KASW/Phoenix, Arizona	KnightTime+ (in-market)
Las Vegas Aces (2025–present)	WNBA	KMCC/Laughlin, Nevada	TBA	TBA
Tampa Bay Lightning (2025–present)	NHL	WXPX-TV/Bradenton, Florida	WRBW/Orlando, Florida; WGFL-DT2/High Springs, Florida; WFGX/Fort Walton Beach, Florida; WFXU/Live Oak, Florida	Tampa Bay Lightning app (in-market)
Nashville Predators (2026–present)	NHL	WNPX-TV/Franklin, Tennessee	WMC-TV 5.3/Memphis, Tennessee; WVLT-TV 8.2/Knoxville, Tennessee; WTVL-CD 49.2/Chattanooga, Tennessee; WBBJ-TV 7.5/Jackson, Tennessee; WDRB 41.2/Louisville, Kentucky; WTVQ-DT 36.2/Lexington, Kentucky; WAFF 48.3/Huntsville, Alabama	Nashville Panthers app (in market)
Detroit Pistons (2026–present)	NBA	WMYD/Detroit, Michigan	WXMI 17.2/Grands Rapids, Michigan	DAZN (in-market)

=== Former regional broadcast rights ===
Team	League	Flagship station	Affiliates	OTT subscription outlet
Arizona Coyotes (2023–2024)	NHL	KASW/Phoenix, Arizona; KNXV-TV/Phoenix, Arizona (former)	KGUN-DT2/Tucson, Arizona; KUPX-TV/Provo, Utah; KSTU-DT2/Salt Lake City, Utah (overflow for KUPX)	Coyotes Central (in-market)
Hawaii Rainbow Warriors football (2025)	Mountain West Conference	—N/a (Note: KGMB and KHNL)	KIVI-DT2/Boise, Idaho and KSAW-LD2/Twin Falls, Idaho; KWBA-TV/Tucson, Arizona; KUPX-TV/Provo, Utah; KPAX-DT2/Missoula, Montana; KXLF-DT2/Butte, Montana; KTVH-DT2/Helena, Montana; KTVQ-DT2/Billings, Montana; KASW/Phoenix, Arizona; KGTV-DT2/San Diego, California; KSBY-DT2/San Luis Obispo, California; KCDO-TV/Denver, Colorado; KMCC/Laughlin, Nevada	Mountain West Network (non-computer only)

== On-air talent ==
=== WNBA ===
- Larry Smith (Studio host)
- Autumn Johnson (Studio analyst)
- Meghan McKeown (Studio analyst)

=== NWSL ===
- JP Dellacamera (Lead play-by-play)
- Jill Loyden (Lead color)
- Maura Sheridan (Secondary play-by-play)
- Jordan Angeli (Secondary color)
- Seb Salazar (Studio co-host)
- Kylen Mills (Studio co-host)
