= KTVH-DT =

Television station in Helena, Montana

KTVH-DT and KTGF-LD

KTVH-DT: Helena, Montana; KTGF-LD: Great Falls, Montana; United States
- Channels for KTVH-DT: Digital: 31 (UHF); Virtual: 12
- Channels for KTGF-LD: Digital: 19 (UHF); Virtual: 50
- Branding: KTVH-DT: KTVH; MTN News; KTGF-LD: KTGF; MTN News

Programming
- Network: Montana Television Network
- Affiliations: 12.1/50.1: NBC; 12.2: MTN; for others, see § Technical information

Ownership
- Owner: E. W. Scripps Company; (Scripps Broadcasting Holdings LLC)
- Sister stations: KRTV, KXLH-LD

History
- First air date: KTVH-DT: January 1, 1958; KTGF-LD: November 16, 2004
- Former call signs: KTVH-DT: KXLJ-TV (1958–1961); KBLL-TV (1961–1973); KTCM (1973–1980); KTVG (1980–1985); KTVH (1985–2009); KTGF-LD: KBGF-LP (2004–2014); KBGF-LD (2014–2018)
- Former channel number: KTVH-DT: Analog: 12 (VHF, 1958–2008); Digital: 14 (UHF, 2004–2009); 12 (VHF, 2009–2025); KTGF-LD: Analog: 50 (UHF, 2004–2014)
- Former affiliations: KTVH-DT: The CW (12.2, 2015–2023)
- Call sign meaning: KTVH-DT: "Television Helena"; KTGF-LD: "Television Great Falls"

Technical information
- Licensing authority: FCC
- Facility ID: KTVH-DT: 5290; KTGF-LD: 128063
- Class: KTGF-LD: LD
- ERP: KTVH-DT: 530 kW; KTGF-LD: 15 kW
- HAAT: KTVH-DT: 671.2 m (2,202 ft); KTGF-LD: 116 m (381 ft)
- Transmitter coordinates: KTVH-DT: 46°49′29.4″N 111°42′15.6″W; KTGF-LD: 47°32′7.5″N 111°17′5.5″W
- Translator: see § Translators

Links
- Public license information: KTVH-DT: Public file; LMS; KTGF-LD: Public file; LMS
- Website: KTVH-DT: www.ktvh.com; KTGF-LD: www.krtv.com/ktgf

KTVH-DT (channel 12) is a television station in Helena, Montana, United States, affiliated with NBC. It is owned by the E. W. Scripps Company alongside CBS affiliate KXLH-LD (channel 9). The two stations share studios on West Lyndale Avenue in Helena; KTVH-DT's transmitter is located on Hogback Mountain. KTVH-DT operates low-power translator KTGF-LD (channel 50) in Great Falls, where Scripps also owns CBS affiliate KRTV.

The only full-service commercial TV station serving Montana's capital city for most of its history, channel 12 came to air in 1958 as KXLJ-TV and struggled through a fight with a competing local cable company, during which it shut down for six months before eventually being purchased by the firm. In the late 1960s and 1970s, channel 12 was owned by former Montana governor Tim Babcock before being sold to two owners who each struggled with financial issues. In 1997, a possible threat of disaffiliation from NBC opened the door for Sunbelt Communications Company, later changed to Intermountain West Communications Company (IWCC), to purchase the station. Under IWCC, the station expanded geographically and secured the NBC affiliation in the larger Great Falls market. Before IWCC owner Jim Rogers died, the station was sold twice to larger station groups before being acquired by Scripps.

It is the only NBC affiliate in the Montana Television Network (MTN), with largely separate programming from the group of mostly CBS affiliates.

== History ==
=== KXLJ-TV ===
The Federal Communications Commission (FCC) allotted two VHF channels to Helena. Helena TV filed for channel 10, while Peoples Forum of the Air, owner of radio station KXLJ (1240 AM) and part of the statewide Z-Bar Network, also applied for channel 10 on April 14, 1956. After the latter amended its application to specify channel 12, both parties were granted construction permits on February 13, 1957; the FCC also rejected a proposal to reallocate channel 12 from Helena to Bozeman. The application from Peoples Forum of the Air specified the station to operate as a satellite service to KXLF-TV in Butte. Peoples Forum of the Air transferred the permit to Capital City Television, Inc., in September 1957, and the first broadcast—the Rose Bowl—went out on January 1, 1958. However, the station was not yet ready in terms of equipment to begin full-time program service on that date; viewers would have to wait until January 30 to see a full slate of programs from the new station. As with its Butte parent, the stations were affiliated with NBC and ABC, NBC being the affiliation across the Z-Bar network. Studios and transmitter were located at the southwest corner of Cherry Street and Montana Avenue, and the station broadcast with an effective radiated power of just 973 watts.

The early years of channel 12 in Helena were marked by turbulence and a dispute that pitted the local television station versus Helena TV's cable system, which imported out-of-market stations. In January 1959, arguments were heard in a lawsuit by Z-Bar versus Helena TV, with KXLJ-TV's counsel arguing that the cable firm had "used our property for gain without our consent". KXLJ-TV manager Barclay Craighead warned that the station might have no choice but to go off the air unless an appeals court granted an injunction against the cable company importing stations from Spokane, Washington. Craighead argued that the FCC essentially "tore up our license" by allowing Helena TV to import Spokane stations. He predicted that cable systems and an FCC decision negatively impacting the use of over-the-air VHF boosters to retransmit stations' signals could ultimately force every television station in Montana out of business. On February 1, 1959, KXLJ-TV suspended operations, but Craighead hoped to return to the air if the FCC began regulating cable in the same way it regulated over-the-air television.

The plight of KXLJ-TV attracted significant political attention. The four-member Montana delegation to Congress wrote to the FCC, asking for an investigation. FCC chair John C. Doerfer planned to visit Montana, but he was called to present the commission's budget to the House of Representatives and could not make the trip. Helena TV, which had abandoned its application for channel 10, made a new request to build a station. The appeals court ordered the FCC to give Capital City Television a hearing in May.

KXLJ-TV won a favorable order from the FCC ordering the removal of the Spokane channels from the Helena cable system in July 1959; when an appeals court placed a 30-day temporary injunction on the order, the station waited to resume operations. When the injunction was vacated and the Spokane stations removed at 3:45 p.m. on August 6, channel 12 returned at 6:50 p.m. that night. The cable firm won out in the long run: a Helena district judge ruled in 1960 that the cable company's rebroadcast of other Montana stations, particularly KFBB-TV from Great Falls, did not violate Z-Bar's rights.

=== KBLL-TV and KTCM ===
In October 1960, Ed Craney—owner of the Z-Bar Network—announced that Joe Sample would acquire his remaining broadcasting holdings and would sell KXLJ radio and television in Helena to Helena TV, the cable firm with which channel 12 had been dueling for almost all of its brief history. The $300,000 purchase was not only significant in separating KXLJ-TV from KXLF-TV; it also meant that the TV station would drop its longstanding opposition to supplementing the area with Spokane stations, allowing the cable company to reinstate the Spokane stations to its lineup. After the FCC approved the sale, the stations became KBLL radio and television formally on March 29 and began using the designation on April 10; that same day, Spokane's KREM and KHQ-TV returned to the cable lineup after 20 months. This was a major economic relief for the company, which in a January 1960 open letter had noted the decision had a material impact on its income. The new KBLL-TV also added programming from CBS to its lineup.

Helena TV sold KBLL-TV to Capital City Television in 1963; under the new ownership, Helena TV owner W. L. Piehl maintained a significant stake, joined by Bob Magness and Paul B. McAdam. In 1966, a second television transmitter opened in Helena, a low-power translator for KFBB-TV on channel 10; the translator protected any program being aired the same day by KBLL-TV by blacking it out.

In early 1968, negotiations began to sell KBLL radio and television to a partnership of Tim Babcock, the then-serving governor of Montana, and Willard L. Holter of Glasgow. The sale was announced at the end of January, with Babcock declaring he would not be active in management and calling the purchase "an investment in Montana". Holter pulled out of the deal after FCC approval was granted, but Babcock and Magness entered into a deal to own the stations, with the $201,421 purchase receiving FCC approval on December 18, 1968. In 1969, KBLL-TV was granted permission to build a satellite station on channel 2 in Anaconda, near Butte, though this was not built.

In 1973, Babcock sold KBLL radio to Holter, not including channel 12. New call letters KTCM ("Television for the Capital of Montana") were selected for the TV station, and an application was filed to move the transmitter to Hogback Mountain. The new 251,000-watt facility, completed in 1975, substantially expanded the television station's reach.

=== KTVG and KTVH ===
In 1979, Babcock sold KTCM to Lynn Koch, who had previously been associated with KMSO-TV in Missoula. Koch announced a focus on improving local news coverage, which under Babcock had received updated equipment and electronic news gathering facilities. On July 28, 1980, Koch changed the call letters to KTVG, hoping to emphasize the "television" part of the call sign.

Rumors of a potential sale of the station were floated as early as February 1983. However, KTVG's financial picture was quickly becoming complicated. With debts coming due, licensee Helena TV, Inc. (of no relation to the 1960s company) filed for Chapter 11 bankruptcy reorganization in June 1983. In May 1984, one of the company's creditors filed to liquidate the business.

In December 1984, a bankruptcy court approved the sale of channel 12 to Great Northern Communications, which signed a contract to purchase the license and physical assets for $1.16 million in March 1985. Great Northern was owned by Don Bradley and Lyle Courtnage, who had recently purchased KMON radio in Great Falls. After becoming available for use the year prior, the KTVH call letters were instituted in August 1985.

Heavily leveraged, Bradley and Courtnage sold KTVH in 1988 to John Radeck of Jacksonville, Florida; Radeck had previously managed stations in other parts of the United States, though KTVH was the first broadcast property he owned outright. Radeck's company, Big Sky Broadcasting, then sued the former ownership for what it claimed were a series of negligent acts, including failure to maintain full transmitter power, failure to operate at normal staffing levels during sale negotiations, and poor maintenance of equipment. Meanwhile, Radeck made purchases of new equipment and planned new weekend and morning newscasts as part of an overhaul to give Helena a "full-service news operation".

=== The Sunbelt and Beartooth years ===
In September 1996, Grapevine Broadcasting of Atlanta, owned by Wendell Reilly, announced its intention to buy KTVH and another Radeck property, KSWT in Yuma, Arizona; Reilly had a background in the publishing and outdoor advertising industries. The sale, however, had a wrench thrown into it by an owner of four other NBC affiliates. Meridian Communications of Montana, a subsidiary of Sunbelt Communications Company of Las Vegas, proposed constructing a new NBC affiliate on channel 10, which was still unused by a full-service station. If KTVH had lost the NBC affiliation, with Helena in the viewing areas of KFBB-TV from Great Falls for ABC and KXLF-TV from Butte for CBS, its future would have been uncertain.

For a time at the end of 1996, the result was two competing plans to build: one by Meridian with minority stockholder the Uhlmann Company for channel 10—which, if it could not secure NBC, would look to acquire the Fox affiliation for the market—and another by Grapevine, which included a new building for KTVH. In February 1997, with the Grapevine sale application having fallen apart the month before, Sunbelt then moved to buy the station from Big Sky, announcing plans to build a studio at a site adjacent to Carroll College. Sunbelt had just built a site under a similar arrangement at Great Basin College for KENV in Elko, Nevada. The Carroll building, completed in 1998, also housed the channel 10 station, which came to air as Fox and UPN affiliate KMTF that August; the stations shared a building but had separate management and sales staffs.

After Jim Rogers took over, eleven employees were fired or forced to resign, resulting in discussion of the unionization of KTVH's staff. While they successfully voted to unionize, no contract was signed after more than nine months. Meanwhile, expansion plans were in the works. Sunbelt sought to replicate what it had done at KENV in Havre and proposed constructing KBBJ (channel 9), a satellite station of KTVH to be based at Montana State University–Northern. The station in the Hi-Line attracted some concern from the incumbent NBC affiliate in Great Falls, KTGF (channel 16), which claimed Havre as part of its market. Sunbelt then announced it would start KBAO (channel 13) in Lewistown, which was also in the Great Falls market; simultaneous with the news, KTGF purchased a translator in that town. Both stations were in service as rebroadcasters by the end of 2000, formally signing on January 2 and 3, 2001. Financial troubles in 2001 led to cutbacks at KTVH, including the end of a 5 p.m. newscast and a short-lived 9 p.m. show it produced for KMTF, which soon after lost the Fox affiliation. Meanwhile, as early as January 2002, the station stated that it would take over the NBC affiliation for the Great Falls market by 2005.

In preparation for expanding to Great Falls, Rogers acquired recently permitted low-power TV station K50IQ. The call letters were changed to KBGF-LP, and the station began broadcasting as the NBC affiliate in that city on July 1, 2005. The then-incumbent NBC affiliate, KTGF, protested, but it cleared the air, conceded NBC to KBGF, and affiliated with Fox; NBC noted that it had switched affiliations because of issues it had with one of KTGF's previous owners, having made the decision "many years ago". Now that KTVH had grown to a four-station operation in two media markets, it adopted the brand "Beartooth NBC". The name stuck, even though the Havre and Lewistown stations closed on January 25, 2008; in July 2009, Sunbelt requested that the licenses for KBBJ and KBAO be canceled. KTVH itself was the first television station in Montana to cease analog broadcasts, doing so on November 10, 2008; the accelerated switch was carried out to avoid major work at the Hogback Mountain site during February winter weather conditions.

Rogers's presence in Montana would also come to change the name of Sunbelt Communications Company. He purchased a summer home in the state and, while exiting a restaurant, was asked why his license plate read "Sunbelt". As a result, Sunbelt became the Intermountain West Communications Company (IWCC).

=== Gray, Cordillera, and Scripps ownership ===
In January 2014, Jim Rogers announced he had bladder cancer for the second time. He had already begun to sell off IWCC's stations, and in May 2014, Beartooth NBC was the next property to be sold and the last outside of the state of Nevada. That May, IWCC announced the sale of KTVH and KBGF to Gray Television; Gray also purchased KMTF, by then an affiliate of The CW, through a failed station waiver. Gray took over KTVH's operations through a local marketing agreement on June 1, two weeks before Rogers died on June 14. The sale of KTVH to Gray closed on November 3, 2014. After the sale closed, Gray dropped the "Beartooth NBC" brand in favor of "KTVH/KBGF". It also completed a much-needed digital conversion for the Great Falls transmitter, which as a low-power station was not subject to the 2009 digital television transition deadline; on December 1, KBGF-LP converted to digital as KBGF-LD, having started on October 26.

On July 1, 2015, Gray announced that it would sell KTVH-DT to Cordillera Communications; concurrently, sister station KMTF was donated to Montana State University and joined the Montana PBS network as KUHM-TV, with its CW programming being transferred to a KTVH subchannel. The sale was completed on October 30. Cordillera's purchase of KTVH made it a sister station to CBS affiliate KXLH-LD (channel 9) and resulted in the integration of KTVH into the Montana Television Network (MTN). KBGF-LD became KTGF-LD on July 1, 2018; that same day, channel 16 in Great Falls switched from KTGF to KJJC-TV. All but one Cordillera station, including the entirety of MTN, was acquired by the E. W. Scripps Company in 2019.

In 2021, Scripps filed to switch all of the full-power MTN stations, including KTVH, from the VHF to the UHF band in order to improve reception; it requested and received channel 31 for KTVH. The conversion of the transmitter facility to UHF took place in August 2025.

== News operation ==
For most of its history, KTVH was the only source of television news covering the Helena area, and local news capacity was slowly built up over the years by different owners. In 1983, there were 4.5 full-time positions in news at channel 12; there were eight by 2008. It was not until the 2010s that serious news competition came to the capital city. In 2010, KXLH-LD started local newscasts for the Helena area, produced by KRTV in Great Falls, which quickly attracted considerable viewership.

After Cordillera acquired KTVH, the station continued to air its own separate newscasts under the MTN brand at 5, 6, and 10 p.m., later adding a weekday morning newscast known as Daybreak; in contrast, the MTN CBS affiliates, such as KXLH, aired their early evening local newscasts at 5:30 p.m.

== Technical information ==
=== KTVH-DT subchannels ===
KTVH-DT's signal, broadcast from Hogback Mountain in Helena, is multiplexed:

Subchannels of KTVH-DT
Subchannel	Res.	Short name	Programming
12.1	1080i	KTVH-HD	NBC
12.2	720p	MTN	Montana Television Network
12.3	480i	BOUNCE	Bounce TV
12.4	480i	CourtTV	Court TV
12.5	480i	Mystery	Ion Mystery
12.6	480i	QVC	QVC

=== KTGF-LD subchannels ===
KTGF-LD is broadcast from its transmitter site on Old Havre Highway in Great Falls. Aside from using major channel 50, KTGF-LD broadcasts a slightly different mix of subchannels. This is because the MTN independent service is aired as a subchannel of KRTV in Great Falls.

Subchannels of KTGF-LD
Subchannel	Res.	Short name	Programming
50.1	1080i	KTGF-LD	NBC
50.2	480i	BOUNCE	Bounce TV
50.3	480i	CourtTv	Court TV
50.4	480i	Mystery	Ion Mystery
50.5	480i	BUSTED	Busted
50.6	480i	QVC	QVC

=== Translators ===
In addition to KTGF-LD, KTVH-DT's signal is rebroadcast over the following translators:

- Chinook: K18KT-D
- Conrad: K25MZ-D
- Dodson: K36CW-D
- Joplin: K33PR-D
- Jordan, etc.: K11HE-D
- Malta: K09JG-D
- Phillips County: K20BP-D
- Saco: K15AS-D
- Sweetgrass: K30MW-D
- Townsend: K04QX-D
- Whitewater: K34DN-D

=== Former satellites ===
From January 2001 through January 25, 2008, KTVH also operated two full-service satellite stations in northern and central Montana:

Station	City of license	Channel	Facility ID	ERP	HAAT	Transmitter coordinates	First air date	Last air date	Ref
KBBJ	Havre	9	83689	9 kW	388.8 m (1,276 ft)	48°20′32″N 109°43′44″W	January 2, 2001	January 25, 2008	
KBAO	Lewistown	13	84794	9 kW	636 m (2,087 ft)	47°10′40″N 109°32′10″W	January 3, 2001	January 25, 2008	
