= KRTV =

Television station in Great Falls, Montana

KRTV and KXLH-LD
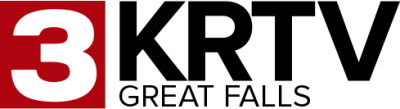

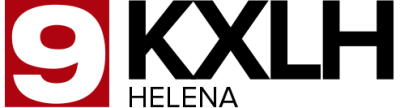

KRTV: Great Falls, Montana; KXLH-LD: Helena, Montana; United States
- Channels for KRTV: Digital: 22 (UHF); Virtual: 3
- Channels for KXLH-LD: Digital: 9 (VHF); Virtual: 9
- Branding: KRTV: KRTV 3; MTN News; KXLH-LD: KXLH 9; MTN News

Programming
- Network: Montana Television Network
- Affiliations: 3.1: CBS; 3.2: MTN; for others, see § KRTV subchannels

Ownership
- Owner: E. W. Scripps Company; (Scripps Broadcasting Holdings LLC)
- Sister stations: KTVH-DT / KTGF-LD

History
- Founded: KXLH-LD: February 1969
- First air date: KRTV: June 27, 1958
- Former channel number: KRTV: Analog: 3 (VHF, 1958–2009); Digital: 7 (VHF, until 2025); KXLH-LD: Analog: 9 (VHF, 2004–2014)
- Former affiliations: Independent (1958–1960); NBC (1960–1986, secondary after 1984); The CW (3.2, 2006–2023)

Technical information
- Licensing authority: FCC
- Facility ID: KRTV: 35567; KXLH-LD: 168401
- Class: KXLH-LD: LD
- ERP: KRTV: 28.5 kW; KXLH-LD: 3 kW
- HAAT: KRTV: 153.5 m (504 ft); KXLH-LD: 626 m (2,054 ft)
- Transmitter coordinates: KRTV: 47°32′7.5″N 111°17′5.5″W; KXLH-LD: 46°49′29.8″N 111°42′15.9″W
- Translators: KXLH-LD 9 Helena; for others, see § Translators

Links
- Public license information: KRTV: Public file; LMS; KXLH-LD: Public file; LMS
- Website: krtv.com; kxlh.com

KRTV (channel 3) is a television station in Great Falls, Montana, United States, affiliated with CBS. It is owned by the E. W. Scripps Company alongside KTGF-LD (channel 50), the local NBC affiliate. KRTV and KTGF are part of the Montana Television Network (MTN), a statewide network including all of the state's CBS-affiliated stations. Studios and transmitter facilities are located on Old Havre Highway in Black Eagle, just outside Great Falls.

In Helena, Montana, KRTV is repeated on a low-power semi-satellite, KXLH-LD (channel 9), which airs the same network and syndicated programming but with Helena-specific commercials. KXLH-LD has studios on West Lyndale Avenue in Helena, shared with that city's NBC affiliate, KTVH-DT (channel 12). Master control and some internal operations of KXLH-LD are handled by KRTV in Great Falls.

KRTV was the second television station to sign on in Great Falls, doing so in 1958. Its purchase by Joe Sample in 1969 led to the foundation of MTN. From 1971 to 1984, the station was MTN's hub and produced statewide newscasts for air across the state. Since the 1990s, the station has generally been the Great Falls market leader for local news.

== History ==
=== Early years and construction ===
After the Federal Communications Commission (FCC) opened applications for new television stations in 1952, it received three in Great Falls, two of them for channel 3 (and a third for channel 5, which became KFBB-TV). However, neither channel 3 proposal came to fruition. The Z-Bar Network filed for four stations across the state but abandoned its channel 3 application for Great Falls. The competing applicant, Montana Farmer (owner of radio station KMON), withdrew its proposal in January 1954.

Interest in the second VHF channel for Great Falls returned on April 25, 1956, when the Cascade Broadcasting Company, owned by Robert and Francis Laird of San Luis Obispo, California, filed for channel 3. The Lairds were granted a construction permit on May 29, 1957. Dan Snyder was named manager, and construction began on the station's studios and transmitter facility on a hill overlooking Black Eagle. Plans were announced to go on the air as an independent station using local and filmed programs.

KRTV began broadcasting on June 27, 1958, at 6 p.m. The station had an inauspicious start. While telecasting was able to recover from the failure of a film projector, that evening a storm with reported wind gusts of up to 70 miles per hour (110 km/h) moved through Great Falls. The winds severely damaged the station's antenna, which needed to be sent back to the factory for repair. KRTV placed a "short, short story" in the Great Falls Tribune about its plight, noting "We shall return! (P.S. Don't ask us when!)" While the station was silent, the Lairds sold it outright to Snyder & Associates. KRTV returned to the air on the afternoon of October 5. That day, an ad in the Tribune declared they would be on the air "if the wind doesn't topple our tower again".

=== NBC affiliation and color programming ===
In May 1960, Paul Crain, owner of KUDI (1450 AM), bought a 26 percent stake in KRTV. It secured a full-time network affiliation with NBC in time for the 1960 World Series in October; previously, NBC had no live affiliate in the area. Western Microwave completed a second microwave path to carry network programs from Salt Lake City.

In 1962, the KRTV building was expanded. The old studio was replaced with a larger one, with the existing space reutilized to house a new color-capable transmitter. The upgrade increased KRTV's effective radiated power from 600 to 30,000 watts and allowed it to air network programs in color. Crain died of a heart attack in 1964. Local color production began in 1967, making KRTV the state's first "full color" station.

In February 1968, Harriscope, Inc., owner of KFBB-TV, opted to affiliate all of its stations with ABC. KFBB-TV had been a primary CBS affiliate. As a result, KRTV became the primary affiliate for CBS and NBC in the city.

=== Becoming part of MTN ===
Snyder reached a deal in October 1968 to sell KRTV to Garryowen Cascade TV, a company owned by Joe Sample. Sample already owned KOOK-TV in Billings and KXLF-TV in Butte. The acquisition gained FCC approval on a 4–3 vote over concerns that Sample would have an outsized influence on Montana television; one commissioner, Kenneth A. Cox, voted for the deal "reluctantly" because concerns over maintaining television service in rural areas outweighed economic concentration questions for him.

While no national network affiliations changed, the KRTV sale to Sample set off a realignment in Montana television. KOOK-TV and KXLF-TV, along with KFBB-TV, were members of the Skyline Network, which provided its members with a microwave connection to Salt Lake City for network programs and also was an advertising sales representative. Affiliation and ownership changes at Skyline's outlets, which also included stations in Idaho, led to the network being dissolved on September 30, 1969. This resulted in the establishment of the Montana Television Network (MTN) with KOOK-TV, KRTV, and KXLF-TV.

Great Falls became a link of outsized importance within the new MTN setup. At KRTV's studio site, feeds from across the state could be easily received. Thus, even though MTN was nominally based in Billings, Great Falls was chosen as the hub city when MTN began the production of a local-regional hybrid newscast in 1971. The MTN News consisted of 15 minutes of network news from Great Falls and another 15 minutes locally produced at each station. Today in Montana, a local talk show hosted by Norma Ashby since 1962, also began to air across the network. In 1973, a new studio facility was completed, and KRTV was upgraded to an effective radiated power of 100,000 watts, the maximum allowed on channel 3.

=== Decline and recovery ===
In 1983, a "burned out" Sample announced he would sell the Montana Television Network to George Lilly. One of Sample's last acts as owner of the Montana Television Network was to move the production of the MTN News from Great Falls to Billings in hopes of improving local news ratings in the state's largest city. Sample had concluded that viewers in Billings would rather hear about "the fender bender in Billings" than larger stories from elsewhere in the state. Further, the order of the newscast was changed to put the local inserts first. Format changes were also implemented for Today in Montana; Norma Ashby left the show after 23 years in 1985, and more news and weather from Billings was added, leading to its renaming as The Noon News in 1986.

The change had opposite effects in the two largest television markets in Montana, Billings and Great Falls. At the same time as the ownership and production changes, Ed Coghlan, who had been the Great Falls-based main anchor for MTN News, left for a job at KCOP-TV in Los Angeles and proceeded to hire away MTN's weather and sports presenters. This caused KRTV's news ratings to decline; after several years with KRTV on top, KFBB-TV took the lead in the market and was able to market itself as a more local newscast than its competitor. Conversely, ratings improved in Billings.

KRTV dropped NBC as a primary affiliation in 1984, when the entire MTN network switched to exclusive CBS affiliation. KRTV and KFBB-TV continued to air a limited number of NBC shows until the third station for Great Falls, KTGF (channel 16), started broadcasting in September 1986.

=== Cordillera ownership and EAS intrusion incident ===
In 1986, Evening Post Industries (Note: By 1991, Evening Post had organized its broadcasting stations as Cordillera Communications.) purchased the MTN stations except for KTVQ in Billings, which Lilly continued to own for another eight years. Beginning in early 1987, first with the 5:30 p.m. newscast and then also at 10 p.m., KRTV began originating its own full-length newscasts as the hybrid setup was wound down. By the end of the decade, KRTV had not only recovered but opened a wide lead over KFBB-TV in the Great Falls news ratings. The change was attributed to the return of KRTV founding employee and later MTN executive Don Bradley, who had left to try owning a TV station in Helena, to manage KRTV from 1988 to 1994.

In 2005, KRTV took over the operations of KXLH-LP in Helena, which had previously been a semi-satellite of KXLF-TV in Butte. KXLF-TV had been rebroadcast to Helena since 1969, when a translator of the Butte station was established. In 2010, KXLH-LD started airing local newscasts for the Helena area produced from Great Falls using local reporters, separate anchor talent, and KRTV's weather and sports presenters. The newscasts quickly attracted considerable viewership.

On February 11, 2013, at approximately 2:33 p.m. MST, an unknown hacker reportedly gained access to the station's Emergency Alert System (EAS) encoder and sent out a local area emergency notification that supposedly warned about zombies, explaining that "the bodies of the dead are rising from their graves and attacking the living" and that the bodies were considered "extremely dangerous". Within minutes, station staff informed the public of the system intrusion and that there was no emergency. A similar incident that night affected two television stations in Marquette, Michigan. When a clip of the EAS activation was re-aired by DJs at WIZM-FM in La Crosse, Wisconsin, the use of the EAS header inadvertently led to WIZM-FM and La Crosse TV station WKBT-DT rebroadcasting the alert. In a bulletin following the incident, the FCC advised broadcasters to secure EAS gear behind firewalls and change default passwords, which had evidently not been done at KRTV.

=== Scripps ownership ===
Scripps acquired 15 of the 16 stations owned by Cordillera Communications, including all of MTN, in 2019. In 2021, Scripps filed to switch all of the full-power MTN stations, including KRTV, from the VHF to the UHF band in order to improve reception; it requested channel 22 for KRTV. The commission approved this request on November 29, 2022, and the channel change was completed in December 2025. However, KRTV received FCC approval in January 2026 to keep the VHF transmitter facility active for a short time as it worked to reestablish a feed to its translator in Stanford, Montana, which was not reliably receiving the UHF transmission and was the input source for translators serving 32,000 viewers.

== Technical information ==
=== KRTV subchannels ===
KRTV's signal, from a transmitter at the station's studios in north Great Falls, is multiplexed:

Subchannels of KRTV
Subchannel	Res.	Short name	Programming
3.1	1080i	KRTV	CBS
3.2	720p	MTN	Montana Television Network
3.3	480i	Grit TV	Grit
3.4	480i	ION TV	Ion
3.5	480i	LAFF TV	Laff
3.6	480i	HSN TV	HSN

=== KXLH-LD subchannels ===
Aside from using virtual channel 9, KXLH-LD broadcasts a slightly different mix of subchannels from its transmitter on Hogback Mountain. Ion Plus is carried on KTVH's Great Falls semi-satellite, KTGF-LD, and the MTN independent service is carried on KTVH.

Subchannels of KXLH-LD
Subchannel	Res.	Short name	Programming
9.1	1080i	KXLH	CBS
9.2	480i	Grit TV	Grit
9.3	480i	LAFF	Laff
9.4	480i	ION	Ion
9.5	480i	ION+	Busted
9.6	480i	HSN	HSN

=== Analog-to-digital conversion ===
KRTV shut down its analog signal (VHF channel 3) on February 17, 2009, the original digital television transition date. The station's digital signal remained on its pre-transition VHF channel 7.

=== Translators ===
In addition to KXLH-LD, KRTV has 20 other dependent translators in north-central and northern Montana.

- Big Sandy, Montana: K19JQ-D
- Chinook: K13OU-D
- Conrad: K18KM-D
- Denton: K12RE-D
- Dodson: K10FC-D
- Fort Peck: K22MN-D
- Glasgow: K09HY-D
- Havre: K09ZB-D
- Hinsdale: K10JK-D
- Joplin: K27JW-D
- Lewistown: K15LD-D
- Malta: K13GP-D
- Phillips County: K24MN-D
- Saco: K12FB-D
- Stanford: K11WK-D
- Sweetgrass: K25NJ-D
- Tampico: K30LC-D
- West Knees: K11WQ-D
- Whitewater: K11GX-D
- Wolf Point: K19JR-D
