= Dodson High School =

Dodson High School may refer to:

- Dodson High School (Louisiana) in Dodson, Louisiana
- Dodson High School (Montana) in Dodson, Montana
