= Montana Television Network =

Regional television network

- The 2025 MTN logo, used fully on the network's DT2 subchannels as their branding.
- Type: Statewide network affiliates
- Branding: MTN
- Country: United States
- Availability: Montana
- Owner: E. W. Scripps Company
- Launch date: September 30, 1969; 57 years ago
- Affiliations: CBS (most stations); NBC (KTVH-DT); Utah Mammoth (game broadcasts on DT2 subchannels); Vegas Golden Knights (game broadcasts on DT2 subchannels)

The Montana Television Network (MTN) is a statewide network of CBS affiliates in the U.S. state of Montana. It also includes one NBC station. All of these stations are owned by the E. W. Scripps Company. In addition, MTN owns the Montana Ag Network, which provides farm and ranch reports on television.

Established in 1969 in its current form by Montana broadcasting pioneer Joe Sample, MTN was originally conceived as a way to unify Montanans and connect the state's comparatively isolated population centers. Between 1971 and 1986, the MTN stations aired hybrid local/network newscasts that consisted of sections of statewide and local news; this approach was abandoned in favor of producing separate local newscasts in each city. All of the stations became exclusive CBS affiliates in 1984 and air the same syndicated programming. MTN operated under split ownership from 1986 to 1994, when the Billings station was reunited with the rest of the network. Expansions in local news in Kalispell and Bozeman, as well as a full entrance into the Helena market and later the purchase of its established commercial station, have grown the network over the last 20 years.

== History ==
=== Skyline Network ===
The predecessor to MTN was the Skyline Network, which began in 1958. It included KOOK-TV in Billings, KXLF-TV in Butte and its satellite KXLJ-TV in Helena, and KFBB-TV in Great Falls, as well as two Idaho properties, KID-TV in Idaho Falls and KLIX-TV in Twin Falls. The network was organized by the owners of KXLF, KID-TV, and KMVT. It provided network programming from the three commercial stations in Salt Lake City to southern and eastern Idaho and Montana on a series of microwave links; a related company, Skyline Advertisers Sales, provided ad sales services for all of the stations. The stations had varied network affiliations; KXLF-TV, a primary outlet of CBS since 1958, refused to carry the 1962 World Series from NBC in part because doing so would deny any network programs to KFBB in Great Falls, which was not affiliated with NBC.

KXLJ exited the network in 1960, leaving it without a node in the capital. A year later, Joe Sample purchased KXLF-TV. In 1969, Sample bought Great Falls's other station, KRTV, which had replaced KFBB in Skyline.

=== Foundation of MTN ===
A combination of affiliation and ownership changes at the various Skyline outlets led to the network dissolving on September 30, 1969. Sample then merged the three stations owned by his Garryowen Corporation—KOOK-TV, KRTV, and KXLF-TV—into the Montana Television Network. The three stations' combined footprint covered half of Montana's population. The next year, KPAX-TV began in Missoula as a satellite of KXLF-TV. In 1972, Sample sold KOOK radio, and KOOK-TV became KTVQ.

Last version of the former logo, used from 1971 to 2019. Each star represented a station in the network.

In 1971, MTN instituted a network newscast, which was based at KRTV (since feeds to the rest of the network could be easily made from Great Falls) and included a segment of local news in each city. Missoula began producing a local news segment in 1977 when KPAX was spun out from KXLF-TV as a full-fledged station. Earlier, in 1969, Today in Montana, a 30-minute morning agriculture program that had aired in Great Falls since 1962, began airing on KOOK and KXLF as well after Sample bought KRTV.

Sample believed that a regional newscast could serve as a unifying influence in Montana, a mostly rural state with widely separated population centers. He hoped that, by presenting the major stories from around the state, viewers would be able to agree on important issues. This helped MTN lead the local news ratings in Butte, Great Falls, and Missoula; however, KULR-TV led the local news race in Billings. Despite this, Sample "stubbornly" clung to the concept.

=== A focus on Billings ===
In 1983, a "burned out" Sample announced he would sell the Montana Television Network to George Lilly. One of Sample's last acts as owner of the Montana Television Network was to move the production of the MTN News from Great Falls to Billings in hopes of improving local news ratings in the state's largest city. Sample had concluded that viewers in Billings would rather hear about "the fender bender in Billings" than larger stories from elsewhere in the state. Further, the order of the newscast was changed to put the local inserts first. Format changes were also implemented for Today in Montana; Norma Ashby left the show after 23 years, and more news and weather from Billings was added, leading to its renaming as The Noon News in 1986.

The change had opposite effects in the two largest television markets in Montana. At the same time as the ownership and production changes, Ed Coghlan, who had been the Great Falls-based main anchor for MTN News, left for a job at KCOP-TV in Los Angeles and proceeded to hire away MTN's weather and sports presenters. This caused KRTV's news ratings to decline; after several years with KRTV on top, KFBB took the lead in the market and was able to market itself as a more local newscast than its competitor. Conversely, KTVQ made some inroads on dominant KULR-TV. KULR-TV anchor Dave Rye argued that the Lilly approach to news was too "big-city" for Montanans.

SJL also returned all of MTN's stations to exclusive CBS affiliation in 1984. KTVQ had lost most NBC programs in 1980 and the remainder two years later to the new KOUS-TV, but KRTV was still airing some NBC programs, and KXLF and KPAX were primary ABC affiliates.

=== Split ===
In 1986, Evening Post Industries purchased the MTN stations outside of Billings, which Lilly continued to own for another eight years. Evening Post beefed up the news staffs in Great Falls, Missoula and Butte, which began producing full 30-minute local newscasts for their areas. Despite the split ownership, the network continued as a going concern, exchanging news and sports stories and airing programs of statewide interest.

The network made three expansions—an affiliation and two acquisitions—in the late 1980s and 1990s. KPAX purchased a translator in Kalispell, K18AJ, in 1988. In 1990, KXGN-TV in Glendive, the only station in the nation's smallest television market, became affiliated with MTN and began airing KTVQ's newscasts. Three years later, Evening Post acquired KCTZ, an ABC affiliate in Bozeman; the full-power station became a repeater of KXLF, while KCTZ's Butte translator and KXLF's relay for Bozeman retained the ABC affiliation. (KCTZ became a Fox affiliate between 1996 and 2000.)

In 1994, the Evening Post purchased KTVQ from Lilly, reuniting MTN. In 2015, the company's Cordillera subsidiary purchased KTVH-DT—the former KXLJ-TV—in Helena and its Great Falls satellite, KBGF-LD, from Gray Television. The deal gave MTN an NBC affiliate for the first time since 1984, supplementing CBS outlet KXLH-LD.

=== Scripps ===
MTN logo, used from 2019 to 2025.

On October 29, 2018, Cordillera announced the sale of the MTN stations to the E. W. Scripps Company as part of a $521 million deal to sell 15 of the 16 television stations that Cordillera owned to Scripps. The deal was completed on May 1, 2019.

MTN acquired the rights to Big Sky Conference football and women's basketball for the 2022–23 season. In May 2023, the Scripps Sports division signed regional rights to the Vegas Golden Knights ice hockey team. To accommodate the additional games, MTN did not renew its affiliation with The CW and converted the subchannels to independent stations. In August 2023, the sports subchannels were rebranded as The Spot – MTN.

KXGN-TV remained an MTN affiliate until 2025, when the station was sold to Montana PBS co-operator Montana State University.

== MTN-owned stations ==
=== CBS affiliates ===
- KBZK – Bozeman, Montana
- KTVQ – Billings, Montana
- KRTV – Great Falls, Montana
  - KXLH-LD – Helena, Montana
- KXLF – Butte, Montana
- KPAX – Missoula, Montana
  - KAJJ-CD – Kalispell, Montana

=== NBC affiliates ===
- KTVH – Helena, Montana
  - KTGF-LD – Great Falls, Montana
