= KFBB-TV =

Television station in Great Falls, Montana

KFBB-TV and KHBB-LD

KFBB-TV: Great Falls, Montana; KHBB-LD: Helena, Montana; United States
- Channels for KFBB-TV: Digital: 8 (VHF); Virtual: 5
- Channels for KHBB-LD: Digital: 21 (UHF); Virtual: 21
- Branding: KFBB-TV: NonStop Local Great Falls; KHBB-LD: NonStop Local Helena

Programming
- Affiliations: 5.1/21.1: ABC; 5.2/21.2: Fox/MyNetworkTV; 5.3/21.3: SWX Right Now

Ownership
- Owner: Cowles Company; (Cowles Montana Media Company)

History
- First air date: KFBB-TV: March 21, 1954; KHBB-LD: July 7, 1992
- Former call signs: KHBB-LD: K21DU (1992–2002); KHBB-LP (2002–2008)
- Former channel number: KFBB-TV: Analog: 5 (VHF, 1954–2009); KHBB-LD: Analog: 21 (UHF, 1992–2008)
- Former affiliations: KFBB-TV: CBS (primary 1954–1966, secondary 1966–1969); DuMont (secondary, 1954–1955); NBC (secondary, 1954–1958 and 1969–1986); ABC (secondary, 1954–1966); PBS (per-program, 1970–1984)
- Call sign meaning: KFBB-TV: F. A. Buttrey Broadcast Inc. (original owners of radio station); KHBB-LD: Helena Buttrey Broadcast Inc.

Technical information
- Licensing authority: FCC
- Facility ID: KFBB-TV: 34412; KHBB-LD: 34413
- Class: KHBB-LD: LD
- ERP: KFBB-TV: 31 kW; KHBB-LD: 5 kW
- HAAT: KFBB-TV: 143.3 m (470 ft); KHBB-LD: 220.3 m (723 ft)
- Transmitter coordinates: KFBB-TV: 47°32′8″N 111°17′5″W; KHBB-LD: 46°46′11.7″N 112°1′24.9″W
- Translator: see § Translators

Links
- Public license information: KFBB-TV: Public file; LMS; KHBB-LD: Public file; LMS
- Website: www.nonstoplocal.com/great-falls-helena/

KFBB-TV (channel 5) is a television station in Great Falls, Montana, United States, affiliated with ABC, Fox and MyNetworkTV. Owned by the Cowles Company, the station maintains studios and transmitter facilities on Old Havre Highway in Black Eagle (with a Great Falls mailing address).

KHBB-LD (channel 21) in Helena operates as a semi-satellite of KFBB-TV. As such, it simulcasts all network and syndicated programming as provided through KFBB-TV, but airs separate commercial inserts and legal identifications. KHBB-LD is operated out of KFBB's sales office and news bureau on Euclid Avenue in Helena, while its transmitter is located atop Copper Butte. Both stations offer Fox via their second digital subchannels (until 2009, only KHBB-LD did so, as Fox programming in Great Falls was seen on KLMN). KFBB-TV is also repeated on several translators.

== History ==
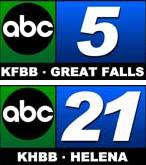
KFBB-TV/KHBB-LP logos, used through 2008.

KFBB-TV began broadcasting on March 21, 1954. As the first television station in Great Falls, KFBB-TV was affiliated with all four major networks, and would broadcast programming from all three until KRTV signed on and took the NBC affiliation in October 1958. KFBB-TV continued to air CBS and ABC programming as a member of the Skyline Network (as the Montana Television Network was then called).

At first KFBB-TV was owned by Wilkins Broadcasting along with KFBB radio (1310 AM, now KEIN), of which The Anaconda Company owned a 27.5% share. Anaconda, through its Fairmount division, controlled most of the major newspapers in Montana (although not the Great Falls Tribune) and was notorious for manipulating the state's political visions for its own needs. Then in 1959, Anaconda sold its media holdings to Lee Enterprises of Davenport, Iowa. Because of antitrust concerns, Lee decided to sell KFBB. The station was sold in 1962 to Harriscope Broadcasting, which in 1965 scored a deal for a primary ABC affiliation—Montana's first. The new affiliation took effect on February 1, 1966. Harriscope severed KFBB's links with the Skyline Network (which signed up with KRTV), and sold off KFBB radio in February 1969, but continued to run KFBB-TV, eventually selling it to Donald P. Nathanson in 1977. After affiliating primarily with ABC, the station continued secondary affiliation with CBS until that network switched to KRTV in 1969, and then started running NBC on a per program basis as late as December 1986, when KTGF (now KJJC-TV) signed on and took over the NBC affiliation. KFBB also carried Sesame Street for several years, before Montana had a PBS service of its own.

KFBB's ABC affiliation allowed it to be carried on cable television systems in both Alberta and Saskatchewan; it even maintained a sales office in Saskatoon, as did Williston stations KUMV-TV and KXMD-TV. This arrangement continued until 1986, when KFBB was largely replaced by a satellite signal from WXYZ-TV, the ABC affiliate in Detroit.

An April 1981 application with the Federal Communications Commission (FCC) requested transfer of control of the licensee corporation from owner Donald P. Nathanson to his estate, following his death. In early 1982, the station saw a flurry of transfers that saw KFBB-TV moved, first from the Nathanson estate to Advance TV of California, then from Advance TV to Wooster Republican Printing Company of Ohio, which would operate the station through various holding companies (e.g., KFBB Corporation, KFBB LLC, Dix Communications).

KFBB-TV logo used from 2008 through 2012, the "5" in the logo survived until 2014.

In June 2003, Wooster Republican Printing made deep cuts in local news production, ending morning, noon and weekend newscasts. It retained KFBB until November 2004, when it was sold to Max Media of Montana, owner of KTGF. Since the Great Falls market did not have enough full-power television stations to allow a broadcast duopoly, Max Media kept the more-established KFBB and sold KTGF. In 2008, the station began using an on-air logo identical to the former logos of ABC affiliate WEWS-TV in Cleveland and CBS affiliate KREX-TV in Grand Junction, Colorado—neither station is related to KFBB. In 2012, the station returned to the "ABC 5" branding (which had been used prior to 2006).

On September 30, 2013, the Cowles Company acquired Max Media's Montana television station cluster (KULR, and ABC affiliates KWYB/Butte, KFBB-TV/Great Falls, KHBB-LD/Helena and KTMF/Missoula) for $18 million. The sale was completed on November 29. Soon after the purchase, Cowles merged its Montana ABC stations into a regional network based at KFBB, under the branding "ABC Montana."

=== KFBB-DT2/KHBB-LD2 (Fox Montana) ===
Since July 13, 2009, KFBB's subchannel has been carrying Fox programs. Prior to that, only KHBB did so, since October 2008, as Fox was received via KLMN, and before that, in Helena, viewers received Fox programming via KMTF, later from Foxnet, when KMTF joined Pax TV (later i, now Ion) in 2001, and then from the network's Denver affiliate KDVR after Foxnet shut down in 2006. Fox is broadcast on digital channel 21.2, and, like 21.1, is available in 720p high definition. Programming from Fox's secondary MyNetworkTV service is aired unbranded an hour after Fox prime time, after a half-hour newscast and Inside Edition on weeknights.

== News operation ==
Of the three full-service television stations in Montana owned by Cowles Company, only KFBB-TV offers a significant schedule of local news. There are two half-hour local newscasts at 5 and 6 p.m. and a 35-minute newscast at 10 p.m. each weeknight, plus half-hour newscasts at 5 and 10 p.m. on the weekends. KFBB also produces a ten-minute nightly newscast for Cowles' other ABC Montana stations, KTMF in Missoula and Kalispell and KWYB in Butte and Bozeman. The newscast is called 10@10, and focuses on Montana sports and weather in the first ten minutes.

In February 2005, Max Media instituted a regional newscast, branded as Montana News Network, which was produced at KFBB. The regional newscast did not last long. KFBB was then rebranded NewsChannel 5, with a focus on "Live, Local, Late-Breaking Coverage". In addition to the morning weather cut-ins and its weeknight newscasts at 5:30 and 10 p.m. newscasts, the station soon added weekend newscasts back to the lineup.

In 2009, KFBB added staff to become the largest news team in central Montana. The newscasts took on a new slogan, "NewsChannel 5 is Everywhere", to capitalize on its reporting strength in Great Falls and its three bureaus. The weather segments took on the identity of "Pinpoint Weather", showcasing the station's award-winning customized forecasts for central and northern Montana. The station also increased its news production on the weekend, adding a 5:30 p.m. newscast, as well as the 10 p.m. weekend news already running.

On September 21, 2009, KFBB expanded further, adding a 5 p.m. newscast and moving the 5:30 newscast to 6 p.m., swapping with ABC World News Tonight. A full page ad in Signature Montana magazine in April 2010 highlighted the fact that KFBB has the most TV newscasts in the evening in the market.

== Technical information ==
=== Subchannels ===
The stations' signals are multiplexed:

Subchannels of KFBB-TV and KHBB-LD
Channel		Res.	Short name		Programming
KFBB-TV	KHBB-LD	Res.	KFBB-TV	KHBB-LD	Programming
5.1	21.1	720p	KFBBABC	KHBBABC	ABC
5.2	21.2	720p	KFBBFOX	KHBBFOX	Fox/MyNetworkTV
5.3	21.3	720p	KFBBSWX	KHBBSWX	SWX Right Now

=== Analog-to-digital conversion ===
KFBB-TV received its digital television (DTV) allocation from the FCC in April 1997. Originally, KFBB-DT was to be on channel 39, but in June 2001, the FCC agreed to change the allocation to channel 8, and granted the permit to construct digital facilities on March 14, 2002. By the end of April 2002, the station was already on the air and was licensed on November 1, 2002. The station shut down its analog signal, over VHF channel 5, on June 12, 2009, the official date on which full-power television stations in the United States transitioned from analog to digital broadcasts under federal mandate. The station's digital signal remained on its pre-transition VHF channel 8, using virtual channel 5.

On August 9, 2006, the FCC granted "flash-cut" authorization to KHBB-LD, meaning that on or before August 9, 2009, analog station KHBB-LP would shut down and digital station KHBB-LD would commence broadcasting on channel 21. On November 27, 2008, KHBB-LP turned off its analog signal and began broadcasting in digital, with ABC programming on 21.1, and Fox programming on 21.2. Both subchannels broadcast in 720p high definition.

=== Translators ===
All translators relay KFBB-TV unless noted.

- K17KE-D Belt, etc.
- K10BK-D Big Sandy
- K24KU-D Chinook
- K14AG-D Circle, etc.
- K23LX-D Conrad
- K10RC-D Denton
- K12GP-D Dodson
- K35NF-D Fort Peck
- K31MJ-D Four Buttes, etc.
- K07JG-D Glasgow
- K34PM-D Joplin
- K07VA-D Jordan
- K36PB-D Lewistown
- K07IC-D Malta
- K26LG-D Phillips County
- K09BX-D Saco
- K32JU-D Tampico
- K07EJ-D Townsend (translates KHBB-LD)
- K13DU-D Whitewater
- K27JQ-D Wolf Point
