= KTVQ =

Television station in Billings, Montana

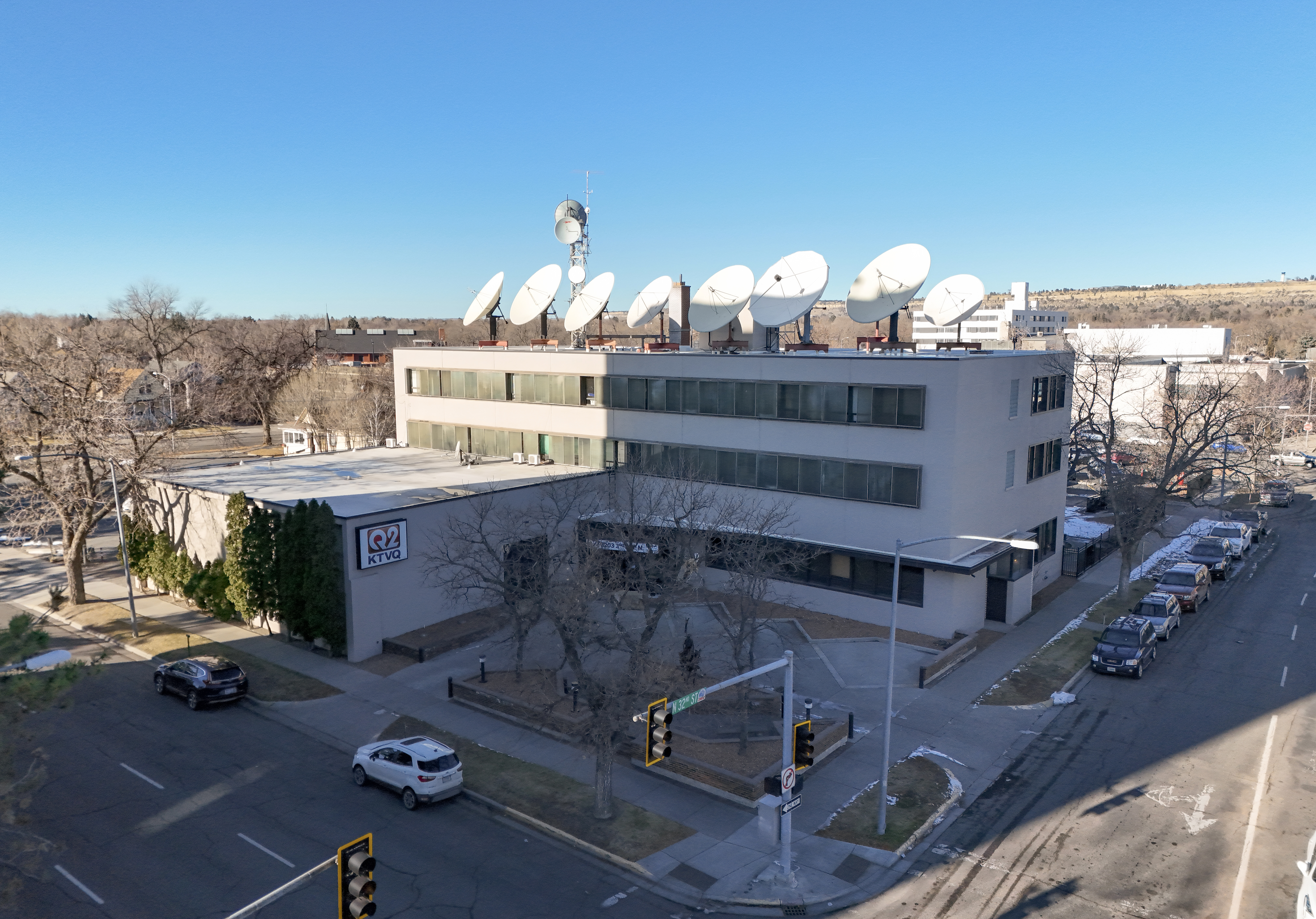
- KTVQ studios in downtown Billings
- Billings, Montana; United States
- Channels: Digital: 20 (UHF); Virtual: 2
- Branding: Q2; MTN News

Programming
- Network: Montana Television Network
- Affiliations: 2.1: CBS; 2.2: MTN; for others, see § Subchannels

Ownership
- Owner: E. W. Scripps Company; (Scripps Broadcasting Holdings LLC)

History
- First air date: November 9, 1953
- Former call signs: KOOK-TV (1953–1972)
- Former channel numbers: Analog: 2 (VHF, 1953–2009); Digital: 10 (VHF, until 2025)
- Former affiliations: DuMont (1953–1955/56); NBC (secondary, 1953–1958 and 1968–1982); ABC (secondary, 1953–1968); PBS (per program, 1970–1984); The CW (2.2, 2006–2023)

Technical information
- Licensing authority: FCC
- Facility ID: 35694
- ERP: 1,000 kW
- HAAT: 184 m (604 ft)
- Transmitter coordinates: 45°46′0.9″N 108°27′28.8″W
- Translator(s): see § Translators

Links
- Public license information: Public file; LMS
- Website: www.ktvq.com

KTVQ (channel 2) is a television station in Billings, Montana, United States, affiliated with CBS. Owned by the E. W. Scripps Company, it is part of the Montana Television Network (MTN), a statewide network of CBS-affiliated stations. KTVQ's studios are located on Third Avenue North in Billings, and its transmitter is located on Sacrifice Cliff southeast of downtown.

Channel 2 began broadcasting as KOOK-TV on November 9, 1953. It was the first television station in Billings and the third in the state of Montana, built by radio station KOOK. It has been a CBS affiliate since its inception. The Montana Network, the original owner, sold the KOOK stations to Joe Sample in 1956, and they moved into the present KTVQ studios in 1959. Sample's acquisitions of KXLF-TV in Butte in 1961 and KRTV in Great Falls in 1969 formed the basis of the Montana Television Network; KOOK radio was sold off in 1973, and channel 2 changed its call sign to KTVQ.

While the network was nominally headquartered in Billings, the network's split regional news format used Great Falls as a hub. As a result of the newscast style implemented by Sample, channel 2 sank in the local news ratings against the all-local newscasts on competitor KULR-TV. Coinciding with Sample's sale of the MTN stations to SJL, Inc., in 1984, the network newscasts shifted to Billings and were eventually phased out altogether. In 1987, KTVQ overtook KULR-TV in local news ratings and became the dominant station in the market.

== History ==
The Montana Network, owner of radio station KOOK (970 AM), applied on December 13, 1952, for a construction permit to build a new TV station on channel 2 in Billings, which was granted by the Federal Communications Commission (FCC) on February 4, 1953. The turnaround time was short considering that Robert S. Howard, who owned Scripps-associated radio and newspaper holdings in Utah and Idaho, had also applied for channel 2, but his firm dropped its bid and cleared the way for The Montana Network. KOOK had already revealed it had held an option for two years to build a transmitter site on Coburn Hill. Ground was broken on the studio and transmitter facilities there in early June, and programming from KOOK-TV began on November 9, 1953. It was the third station in the state: Butte's KXLF-TV had begun in August, and a second station, KOPR-TV, had started there at about the same time. KOOK-TV was affiliated with CBS, ABC and the DuMont Television Network at launch.

In December 1956, Joseph Sample acquired majority control of KOOK radio and television from its previous ownership, headed by Charles L. Crist, a state representative. A year later, KOOK broke ground on a new radio and television center in downtown Billings, which was completed in 1959; three homes were moved off the property before construction began. By the time the building was completed, a second television station, KGHL-TV (channel 8, now KULR-TV), had begun in 1958.

Sample later expanded his holdings across the state. In 1961, he acquired KXLF in Butte; in 1969, he purchased KRTV in Great Falls, giving his Garryowen Broadcasting coverage of half the state's population. The Montana Television Network (MTN) was formed that same year from these stations and KPAX-TV in Missoula, which was built in 1970. In 1972, seeking to get ahead of a proposed FCC rule that would have barred radio-television cross-ownership, Sample sold KOOK radio; the call letters were retained by the radio station, and the television station changed its call sign to KTVQ on September 1, 1972. The new designation was chosen because the station had exhausted its preferred options, it was available, "Q2" (which became the station's moniker) was a branding option, and due to a since-repealed FCC regulation prohibiting TV and radio stations in the same market, but with different ownership, from sharing the same call signs.

In 1968, channel 2 picked up a secondary affiliation with NBC after KULR opted to take a primary affiliation with ABC. The two stations shared NBC programming, though KTVQ retained right of first refusal. In 1979, for instance, KTVQ aired 17 CBS prime time shows and 10 from NBC; ABC shows were all seen on KULR, which rounded out its schedule with five additional shows not cleared by KTVQ. In 1980, KTVQ became a primary CBS affiliate. KOUS (channel 4) launched late that year and immediately took all NBC programming that KTVQ did not clear; NBC fare aired by KTVQ at the time included The Today Show, The Tonight Show, and several prime time shows, and some of these programs lasted on channel 2 until KTVQ's NBC affiliation contract ended in 1982 and KOUS-TV became the NBC affiliate.

After nearly 27 years owning KTVQ and feeling "burned out" with television, Sample sold the Montana Television Network in 1983 to SJL Broadcasting. Evening Post Industries (through its Cordillera Communications subsidiary) bought KTVQ in 1994 for $8.5 million; this reunited the station with the rest of MTN, which Evening Post had purchased in 1986. Scripps closed on its purchase of the Cordillera broadcast properties, including MTN, in 2019.

== News operation ==
In 1971, MTN instituted a hybrid local-regional newscast format. The network news was presented from Great Falls, as that was the only place that could receive feeds from all of the MTN stations at the same time; the Billings, Butte, and (from 1977) Missoula stations presented local news inserts into the statewide program. However, in Billings, KTVQ had long been the second-place news finisher behind KULR-TV.

One of Sample's last acts as owner of MTN, at the same time he sold the network to SJL, was to move production of MTN News from Great Falls to Billings in hopes that it would improve MTN's laggard position in the Billings news ratings. Ed Coghlan, who had been the lead anchor from Great Falls, was replaced by Dean Phillips. The order of the newscast was changed to put the local inserts first, and MTN's long-running Today in Montana—which also originated in Great Falls—added news and weather segments aired from Billings. Despite the use of longer interview segments and in-depth reports, Phillips's style was often seen as too big-city for Montanans; Vic Bracht of The Billings Gazette cited an "arrogance factor" that became known even to people who did not watch MTN. Phillips was replaced by Gus Koernig, and the station's ratings immediately improved. In February 1987, both Arbitron and Nielsen found KTVQ to be beating KULR-TV in all time slots. By 1997, KTVQ enjoyed a two-to-one ratings advantage over its competitor for its early evening newscast.

In 1995, President Bill Clinton visited Billings and KTVQ, where he conducted a televised town hall meeting.

In 1990, KTVQ's newscasts began to be seen on KXGN-TV (channel 5) in Glendive when that station joined MTN. KXGN continued to carry KTVQ and MTN programs until 2025, when Montana PBS co-operator Montana State University acquired the station.

== Technical information ==
=== Subchannels ===
The station's signal is multiplexed:

Subchannels of KTVQ
Subchannel	Res.	Short name	Programming
2.1	1080i	KTVQ-DT	CBS
2.2	720p	MTN	Montana Television Network
2.3	480i	GRIT	Grit
2.4	480i	IONplus	Ion Plus
2.5	480i	BUSTED	Busted
2.6	480i	HSN	HSN
2.7	480i	MVSGLD	MovieSphere Gold

In February 2009, the four major commercial stations in the Billings market were refused FCC permission to end analog broadcasts and operate as digital-only effective on the originally-scheduled February 17, 2009, date.

=== Translators ===
KTVQ is additionally rebroadcast over the following 27 dependent low-power translators:

- Ashland: K16MY-D
- Big Timber, etc.: K17JP-D
- Boyes & Hammond: K09VL-D
- Bridger, etc.: K28LG-D
- Broadus: K08JV-D
- Castle Rock, etc.: K28ON-D
- Cody, WY: K14RF-D
- Colstrip: K12RA-D
- Columbus: K26GL-D
- Diamond Basin, WY: K20LT-D
- Emigrant: K10AH-D
- Forsyth: K16NE-D, K22NN-D
- Hardin: K24GD-D
- Harlowton: K09YO-D, K19JO-D
- Howard: K36PJ-D
- Hysham: K08OW-D
- Judith Gap: K06QN-D
- Livingston, etc.: K34PL-D
- Meeteetse, WY: K21JU-D
- Miles City: K10GF-D
- Red Lodge: K15LB-D
- Rosebud, etc.: K08PP-D
- Roundup: K35PL-D
- Sheridan, WY: K09XK-D
- White Sulphur Springs: K09MH-D
