= KOPR-TV =

Television station in Butte, Montana (1953–1954)

- Butte, Montana; United States
- Channels: Analog: 4 (VHF)

Ownership
- Owner: Copper Broadcasting Company
- Sister stations: KOPR (550 AM)

History
- First air date: August 23, 1953
- Last air date: September 19, 1954

Technical information
- ERP: 600 watts
- HAAT: 350 ft (110 m)
- Transmitter coordinates: 46.0137°N 112.5333°W

KOPR-TV was a television station on channel 4 in Butte, Montana, United States, which operated from 1953 to 1954. It was owned by the Copper Broadcasting Company alongside KOPR (550 AM) and was the second outlet in Butte and the state, broadcasting from studios and a transmitter at the Hotel Finlen.

== History ==
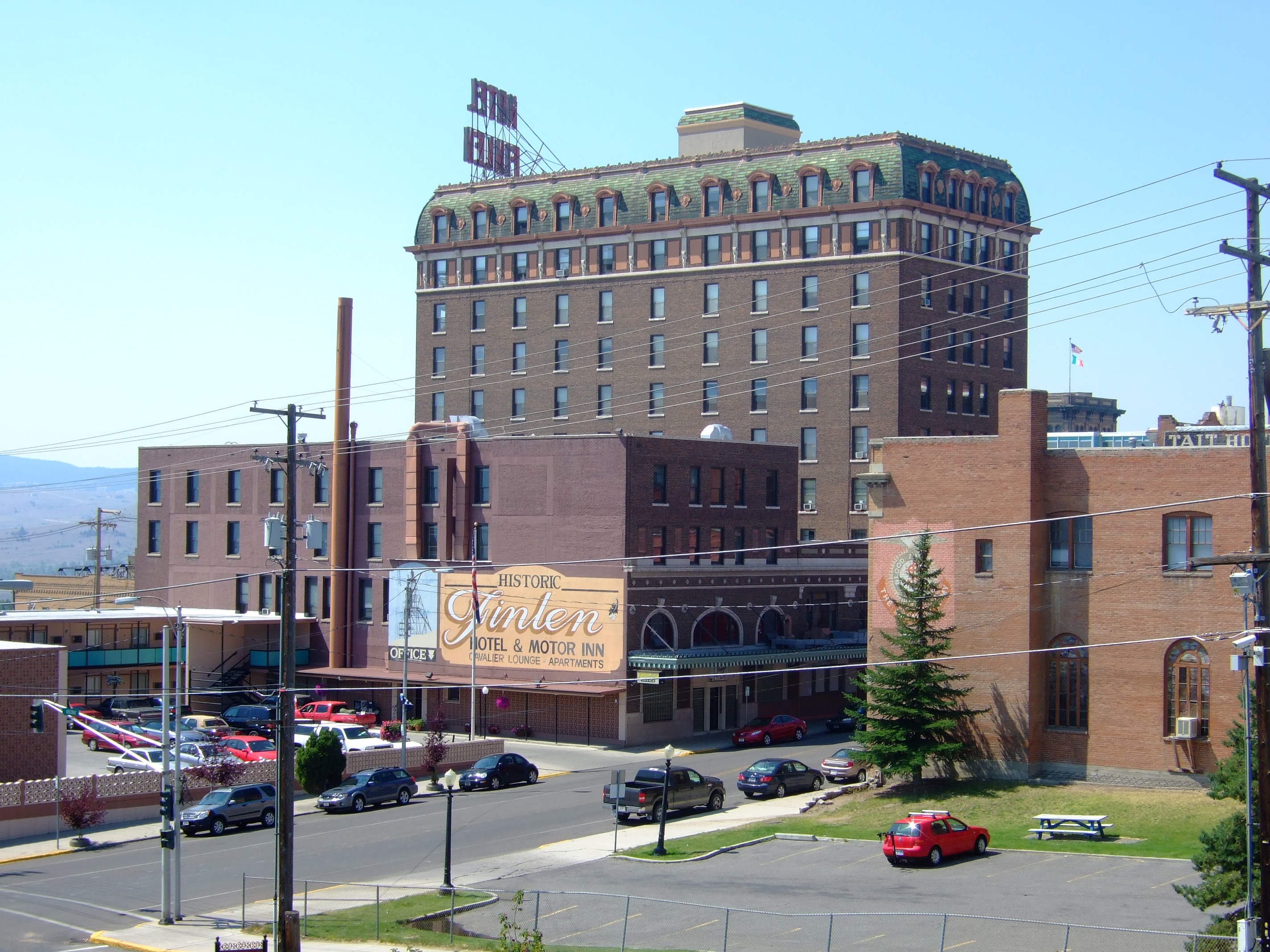
The Hotel Finlen housed KOPR-TV's studio and transmitter.

Copper Broadcasting Company, the parent company of KOPR (550 AM) in Butte, filed the first television station application in Montana on November 30, 1951. It was awarded in January 1953, after the lifting of the Federal Communications Commission (FCC) freeze on new TV stations and on the same day as KFBB-TV in Great Falls and a proposed but never-built channel 8 outlet in Billings.

KOPR-TV first planned to launch in the spring of 1954, but it accelerated its target date to August 15—not coincidentally, when the other television station in Butte, KXLF-TV (channel 6), was projecting to start. KOPR-TV set up in the Hotel Finlen, where the radio station had been based since it began in 1948. The first signal went out August 23, 1953, just nine days after KXLF-TV. The facilities used in operation reflected the haste to get to air: while an effective radiated power of 14,500 watts was authorized, KOPR-TV used just 600. The station had network affiliations with CBS and ABC, while local shows included news, sports, weather, and a music program, Copper Bandstand.

The starting up of two stations at once in a small market—Butte had two operating stations before Billings had one—proved to have financial consequences. KOPR-TV announced it would cease telecasting at the end of the broadcast day on September 19, 1954. An advertisement taken out by the station in that day's edition of The Montana Standard explained that Copper Broadcasting would instead focus on expanding the operations of the radio station and retain the channel 4 permit. In asking for authority to go silent, the station pointed to economic reasons. It was just the fourth full-time VHF station (and sixth total, including two share-time outlets) to fold. The FCC deleted the KOPR-TV construction permit for lack of interest in April 1955; in 1956, KXLF-TV was granted use of channel 4 over co-channel interference concerns to channel 6 at Pocatello, Idaho.

Copper Broadcasting obtained a construction permit for a second KOPR-TV on channel 6 in 1957, which would have broadcast from Mount Fleecer beginning in 1958. No station ever materialized, leaving KXLF-TV as Butte's only television station until the FCC simultaneously granted KGVO-TV in Missoula and Butte's KXLF-TV permission to build translators in each other's service areas in late 1965. In 1970, the KGVO-TV translator was replaced by full-power satellite KTVM.
