= Evening Post Industries =

American media company

- Type: Private
- Industry: Newspapers
- Founded: 1896; 130 years ago
- Fate: Television stations acquired by the E. W. Scripps Company
- Headquarters: Charleston, South Carolina, U.S.
- Area served: United States (Nationwide)
- Key people: Pierre Manigault, Chairman; John Barnwell, President and CEO
- Subsidiaries: Cordillera Communications (defunct)
- Website: www.eveningpostindustries.com

Evening Post Industries (founded as Evening Post Publishing Company) is a privately held American media company based in Charleston, South Carolina, United States. It has been led by four generations of the Manigault family.

The company owns The Post and Courier of Charleston, the South's oldest daily newspaper; the Aiken Standard; and five other newspapers in the state. Other holdings include White Oak Forestry Company and the Clear Night Group marketing agency.

== History ==
The Evening Post Publishing Company was formed by rice planter Arthur Manigault in 1896 to acquire The Evening Post, Charleston's then-ailing afternoon newspaper. Manigault's son Robert became publisher in 1924. Two years later, he bought Charleston's morning paper, The News & Courier, the oldest daily newspaper in the South.

The company launched an international syndication arm, Editors Press Service, in 1933.

When Robert died in 1945, his brother Edward took over; he was in turn succeeded by his son Peter. Peter's son, Pierre, inherited the company upon Peter's death in 2004.

In 2004, the Evening Post Publishing Company sold Editors Press Service to the Universal Press Syndicate, which renamed it Atlantic Syndication.

The company also owned the Buenos Aires Herald in Argentina, Latin America's oldest English language newspaper, until 2007.

In 2007, the company launched Garden & Gun magazine, which it sold in 2009 to a new firm launched by Pierre Manigault.

In 2013, the company renamed itself Evening Post Industries. In a press release, CEO John Barnwell said, “The name change better reflects our existing diversified holdings and ongoing acquisition strategy in beyond media, while keeping the legacy value of Evening Post."

=== Broadcast selloff ===
In October 2018, the company agreed to sell its television-broadcasting subsidiary: Cordillera Communications, a holding company headquartered in St. Paul, Minnesota. 15 of Cordillera's 16 stations were purchased by the E. W. Scripps Company; Quincy Media acquiring KVOA in Tucson, Arizona, because Scripps already owned KGUN-TV. The sale was approved by the FCC on April 5, 2019, and completed on May 1.

Stations formerly owned by Cordillera Communications
| Media market | State | Station | Purchased | Sold | Notes |
|---|---|---|---|---|---|
| Tucson | Arizona | KVOA | 1993 | 2019 | |
| San Luis Obispo–Santa Barbara | California | KSBY | 2004 | 2019 | |
| Pueblo–Colorado Springs | Colorado | KOAA-TV | 1977 | 2019 | |
| Nampa–Boise | Idaho | KIVI-TV | 1981 | 2002 | |
| Lexington | Kentucky | WLEX-TV | 1999 | 2019 | |
| Lafayette | Louisiana | KATC | 1995 | 2019 | |
| Billings | Montana | KTVQ | 1994 | 2019 | |
| Bozeman | Montana | KBZK | 1993 | 2019 | (Note: Satellite of KXLF.) |
| Butte | Montana | KXLF-TV | 1986 | 2019 | |
| Great Falls | Montana | KRTV | 1986 | 2019 | |
| Great Falls | Montana | KTGF-LD | 2015 | 2019 | (Note: Satellite of KTVH.) |
| Helena | Montana | KXLH-LD | 1995 | 2019 | (Note: Satellite of KRTV.) |
| Helena | Montana | KTVH-DT | 2015 | 2019 | |
| Kalispell | Montana | KAJJ-CD | 1988 | 2019 | (Note: Satellite of KPAX.) |
| Missoula | Montana | KPAX-TV | 1986 | 2019 | |
| Corpus Christi | Texas | KRIS-TV | 1998 | 2019 | |
| Corpus Christi | Texas | KZTV | – | | (Note: Owned by SagamoreHill Broadcasting and operated by Cordillera.) |
| Corpus Christi | Texas | K22JA-D | 1998 | 2019 | |
| El Paso | Texas | KDBC-TV | 1974 | 1986 | |

== Properties ==
=== Newspapers ===
- The Post and Courier - Charleston, South Carolina
- The Georgetown Times - Georgetown, South Carolina
- The Kingstree News - Kingstree, South Carolina
- Aiken Standard - Aiken, South Carolina
- Moultrie News - Mount Pleasant, South Carolina
- Summerville Journal-Scene - Summerville, South Carolina
- The Berkeley Independent - Moncks Corner, South Carolina
- Goose Creek Gazette - Goose Creek, South Carolina
- Waccamaw Times - Pawleys Island, South Carolina
- The Star - North Augusta, South Carolina
- Free Times - Columbia, South Carolina
