= KXLF-TV =

Television station in Butte, Montana

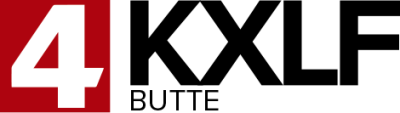

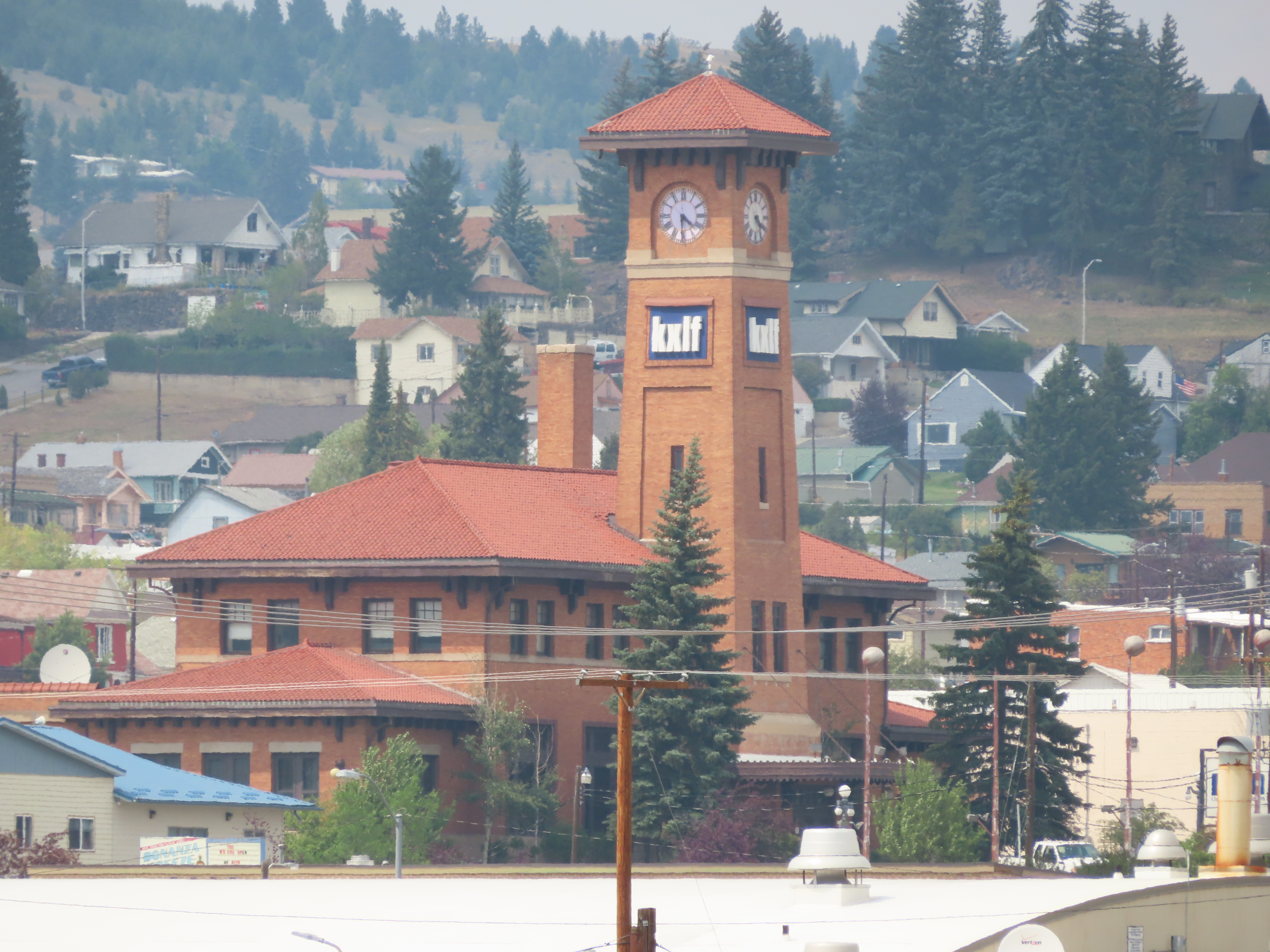
- The KXLF-TV studios in Butte
- Butte, Montana; United States
- Channels: Digital: 15 (UHF); Virtual: 4
- Branding: KXLF 4; MTN News

Programming
- Network: Montana Television Network
- Affiliations: 4.1: CBS; 4.2: MTN; for others, see § Subchannels

Ownership
- Owner: E. W. Scripps Company; (Scripps Broadcasting Holdings LLC)
- Sister stations: KBZK

History
- First air date: August 14, 1953
- Former channel numbers: Analog: 6 (VHF, 1953–1956); 4 (VHF, 1956–2009); Digital: 5 (VHF, until 2025)
- Former affiliations: NBC (1953–1960, secondary 1960–1966); DuMont (secondary, 1953–1955); ABC (secondary 1955–1976 and 1984–1990, primary 1976–1984); UPN (2000–2006); The CW (4.2, 2006–2023)
- Call sign meaning: From the XL Radio Network

Technical information
- Licensing authority: FCC
- Facility ID: 35959
- ERP: 1,000 kW
- HAAT: 636.3 m (2,088 ft)
- Transmitter coordinates: 46°0′27″N 112°26′33″W

Links
- Public license information: Public file; LMS
- Website: www.kxlf.com

KXLF-TV (channel 4) is a television station in Butte, Montana, United States, affiliated with CBS. Owned by the E. W. Scripps Company, it is part of the Montana Television Network (MTN), a statewide network of CBS-affiliated stations. KXLF-TV's studios are located on South Montana Street in downtown Butte, and its transmitter is located on XL Heights east of the city. KXLF-TV and KBZK (channel 7) in Bozeman split the media market.

KXLF-TV is Montana's first and oldest television station. It began broadcasting on August 14, 1953, as an affiliate of NBC and the DuMont Television Network. It was an extension of KXLF radio, part of Ed Craney's regional Z-Bar Network. Originally on channel 6, it relocated to channel 4 in 1956 when it moved its transmitter to XL Heights, atop the Continental Divide, and increased its coverage area. That same year, it moved its studios into a former Milwaukee Road depot. Joe Sample purchased KXLF radio and television in 1960; the station switched primary network affiliations to CBS, and in 1969, it was one of the original three stations in MTN. In 1970, KXLF-TV spawned KPAX-TV in Missoula, which originally was a full-time satellite station but began producing local programming in 1977. It switched its primary affiliation to ABC in 1976 but returned to CBS in 1984.

MTN was sold to SJL, Inc. in 1984, and SJL sold the stations outside of Billings to Cordillera Communications in 1986. KXLF-TV continued producing local inserts into KTVQ's newscasts from Billings until January 1989. KCTZ, now KBZK, was purchased in 1993 to rebroadcast KXLF-TV and returned to that role in 2000. In 2011, KXLF-TV's Butte-area newscasts began to originate from Bozeman.

== History ==
=== Early years ===
Ed Craney, owner of the regional Z-Bar Network of radio stations including KXLF (1370 AM) in Butte, Montana, announced plans for television stations in Butte, Great Falls, and Missoula in November 1951. Television Montana filed its application with the Federal Communications Commission (FCC) on June 26, 1952, for channel 4 and changed to channel 6 on September 26. This was granted on February 25, 1953.

Late on the night of August 14, 1953, KXLF-TV sent out its first test pattern. It was the first television signal broadcast in Montana. Regular programming began August 31, with network programs from NBC and the DuMont Television Network; Butte's other station, KOPR-TV (channel 4), was affiliated with CBS and ABC; that station lasted 13 months before going out of business in 1954.

When KXLF-TV signed on the air, it operated from studios on the upper floor of a Pay 'n Save food and drug store on Harrison Avenue. In 1956, Craney bought the former Milwaukee Road passenger depot and moved the KXLF stations there after the railroad sought out a new depot site with more parking and less office space.

In July 1956, the station moved to channel 4 due to concerns about interference with a proposed channel 6 station in Pocatello, Idaho. Coinciding with the channel change, the station relocated its transmitter to a site along the Continental Divide. The new facility—soon known as XL Heights—increased the station's coverage. For a time, channel 4 branded itself "The Continental Divide Station". In January 1958, the Z-Bar Network put KXLJ-TV (channel 12) on the air in Helena, serving as a satellite station of KXLF-TV; later that year, a translator was put in service to relay the KXLF-TV signal to Missoula. That August, KXLF-TV and KXLJ-TV, in association with KFBB-TV in Great Falls, KOOK-TV in Billings, KID-TV in Idaho Falls, Idaho, and KLIX-TV in Twin Falls, Idaho, formed the Skyline Network, and KXLF-TV became a secondary affiliate of CBS. The Helena station struggled in a lengthy dispute with Helena's local cable television company, which imported the signals of the stations in Spokane, Washington. As a direct result, KXLJ-TV was off the air from February 1 to August 6, 1959.

=== Joe Sample ownership ===
Ed Craney sold the remainder of the Z-Bar Network in 1960 to Joe Sample, the owner of KOOK-TV, for more than $1 million; Sample kept KXLF radio and television, while KXLJ-AM-TV was immediately divested to Helena TV, Inc., the cable company there. Craney had been selling off his broadcasting holdings over the years, and the Montana stations were the last properties he held. After the change, KXLF-TV became a primary affiliate of CBS; this generated outcry in 1962 when the station refused to carry the World Series from NBC because the picture it could receive from KMSO-TV in Missoula was "not of broadcast quality".

In December 1965, the FCC simultaneously authorized KXLF-TV to build a translator on channel 8 in Missoula and KGVO-TV—the former KMSO-TV—to build a translator on channel 6 in Butte. The station further extended its signal to Helena in 1969 with the construction of a second translator. In 1969, the Skyline Network dissolved after Sample acquired KRTV in Great Falls; affiliation and ownership changes at Skyline's outlets led to the network being dissolved on September 30, 1969. This resulted in the establishment of the Montana Television Network (MTN) with KOOK-TV, KRTV, and KXLF-TV.

Sample expanded his Montana network by building KPAX-TV in Missoula in 1970. The new station, which replaced the earlier translator, initially served as a full-time rebroadcaster of KXLF-TV. In 1977, KPAX opened separate studios in Missoula to produce local programming and news. On September 1, 1976, KXLF-TV and KPAX-TV changed from primary affiliates of CBS and secondary affiliates of ABC to primary affiliates of ABC and secondary affiliates of CBS.

=== SJL, Cordillera, and Scripps ownership ===
In 1984, Sample sold the MTN stations to SJL, Inc. for $20 million; KXLF radio was concurrently sold to separate interests and changed call signs. On June 3, KXLF-TV returned to a primary CBS affiliation as the MTN stations standardized with CBS.

SJL sold KXLF, KPAX-TV, and KRTV to the Evening Post Publishing Company, through its Cordillera Communications subsidiary, for $24 million in 1986. While the stations were separated from KTVQ (the former KOOK-TV) in ownership, the Montana Television Network continued much the way it had, and the stations continued to share news segments and stories.

During the early 2000s, KXLF-TV had a secondary affiliation with UPN; the network shut down in 2006 as part of the formation of The CW, which was seen on a digital subchannel of KXLF and KBZK. After the DTV conversion on June 12, 2009, KXLF was one of more than 10 stations asking for a power increase because of the problems with VHF digital signals, particularly low-VHF frequencies. Between 2003 and 2009, responsibility for the Helena repeater, by then KXLH-LP, was transferred from Butte to Great Falls.

In 1993, Evening Post acquired Bozeman station KCTZ (channel 7), a separate ABC affiliate associated with KSVI of Billings, and made it a satellite of KXLF-TV; two Cordillera-owned translators, K26DE (channel 26) in Bozeman and K43DU (channel 43) in Butte, then began carrying most of KSVI's programming (including ABC programming), as well as local Bozeman newscasts produced by Cordillera. After KWYB (channel 18) signed on in September 1996 and took the ABC affiliation in the Butte-Bozeman market, K43DU was taken off-the-air; on October 31, after K26DE's ABC affiliation ended in advance of the launch of KWYB repeater K28FB (channel 28, now KWYB-LD), KCTZ became a Fox affiliate, and channel 26 became a repeater of KXLF. During this time, channel 7 also took on a secondary affiliation with UPN.

KCTZ dropped Fox on August 21, 2000, saying that the network usually generated lower ratings than the Big Three networks in smaller markets, and once again became a satellite of KXLF-TV (though with separate advertising) and changed its call letters to KBZK.

Scripps acquired 15 of the 16 stations owned by Cordillera Communications (the former Evening Post station group), including all of MTN, in 2019. In 2021, Scripps filed to switch all of the full-power MTN stations, including KRTV, from the VHF to the UHF band in order to improve reception; it requested and received channel 15 for KXLF-TV. The changeover was completed in October 2025.

== News operation ==
In 1971, under Joe Sample ownership, MTN instituted a network newscast, which was based in Great Falls (where feeds to the rest of the network could be easily made) and accommodated a segment of local news in each city. Missoula began producing a local news segment in 1977 when KPAX was spun out from KXLF-TV. This helped MTN lead the local news ratings in Butte, Great Falls, and Missoula; however, KULR-TV led the local news race in Billings. In 1984, production of the MTN network news moved from Great Falls to Billings.

While KPAX and KRTV began offering full-length local news programs in 1986, upon the Evening Post purchase, KXLF continued to produce inserts into KTVQ's newscasts in an arrangement that was set to expire in December 1988. The station's news ratings declined as KTVM and its all-local news broadcasts picked up viewers. At that time, KXLF-TV began preparing to produce full-length local newscasts. The change was scheduled for the start of 1989 but was clouded by the station's dismissal of news director Pat Kearney, a Butte native who had worked at KXLF-TV since 1981 and served as its news director since 1986. Kearney sued KXLF-TV and Evening Post in December 1989, seeking compensation for unpaid overtime and four years in lost wages. The wrongful discharge suit went to trial in 1992; testimony centered around Kearney's ill temper during a November 1988 newscast and other workplace behavior issues. A jury found his discharge not wrongful but awarded Kearney $49,000 in overtime pay.

KCTZ produced local Bozeman newscasts while owned by Big Horn Communications; after the station was sold to Cordillera Communications, these newscasts were broadcast on K26DE. Local news returned to KCTZ after the switch to Fox in 1996; however, after channel 7 became KBZK in 2000, the newscasts were canceled and replaced with simulcasts of KXLF's newscasts, retaining a small newsroom in Bozeman to cover stories from the area.

In 2006, KXLF and KBZK began presenting a newscast with an anchor in Butte and another in Bozeman; this was later replaced with separate local newscasts for both areas. In 2011, KXLF anchor Laurel Staples, opted to leave the station. Rather than hire a replacement, Cordillera moved all news production for both markets to Bozeman, with KBZK's Donna Kelley anchoring newscasts for both Butte and Bozeman. However, a full staff remained in Butte, and KXLF remained as master control for both stations. The next year, Cordillera switched from providing KXLF to providing KBZK on Dish Network, leaving satellite dish users in the Butte area unable to view Butte-specific news.

== Technical information ==
=== Subchannels ===
KXLF-TV broadcasts from a transmitter site at XL Heights east of the city of Butte. The stations' signals are multiplexed:

Subchannels of KXLF-TV and KBZK
Subchannel		Res.	Short name		Programming
KXLF-TV	KBZK	Res.	KXLF-TV	KBZK	Programming
4.1	7.1	1080i	KXLF-TV	KBZK	CBS
4.2	7.2	720p	MTN		MTN
4.3	7.3	480i	Grit	GRIT	Grit
4.4	7.4	480i	ION		Ion
4.5	7.5	480i	CourtTV	COURT	Court TV
4.6	7.6	480i	BUSTED	SCRIPPS	Busted

=== Translators ===
KXLF-TV's signal is additionally rebroadcast over the following translators:

- Basin: K09BG-D
- Boulder: K08KT-D
- Polaris: K07OC-D
