= Ed Craney =

American businessman

Edmund Blodgette Craney (February 19, 1905 – April 6, 1991) was an American radio and television executive. He brought the first radio station to Butte, Montana, in 1929, KGIR, which eventually became a part of his chain of unparalleled radio stations dubbed "The Z-Bar Network." Craney also had a hand in starting Montana's first local television station in 1953, which was also located in Butte. Craney founded the Montana Broadcasters Association, while KGIR was the first station to join the National Broadcasters Association.

== Early life ==
Craney was born in Spokane, Washington to Lucy Blodgette, a schoolteacher, and James Craney, a Superintendent of the Great Northern Railway. The elder Craney's job eventually brought him to Swan Lake, Montana to work with the Somers Lumber Company, while his mother remained a teacher. Craney was raised at the family house at Swan Lake, as were his sisters Emily, Martha, and Cora, and brother Oliver. The Craney family lived at Swan Lake on an island that was only accessible by steam boat.

== Beginnings in radio ==
After the family had spent five years at Swan Lake, Craney moved back to Spokane, where he attended North Central High School where he became part of the school's radio club. Although Craney's mother wanted him to become a doctor, his real passion was radio broadcasting. Radio broadcasting was in its primitive stages when Craney began to work with the then-modern equipment. AM radio was still young at this time with very few stations legally broadcasting. The first licensed radio station in the United States, KDKA, went on the air in November 1920. Craney eventually got his First Class Radio License at a radio school held at a YMCA in Seattle, Washington.

With the help of Tom Symons, store owner of Radio Supply, Co., Craney had in a large part contributed to the opening KFDC (later KFPY and KXLY) in Spokane in 1922. Symons eventually backed Craney when he decided to open a broadcast station in the booming mining town of Butte, Montana.

== Building Butte's first radio station ==
=== KGIR ===
The Federal Radio Commission (FRC), which was the predecessor the Federal Communications Commission (FCC), issued the license for radio station KGIR in 1928. The station's location was chosen by Craney, and was to be originally located within the Finlen Hotel. Due to complications, the KGIR studios was built across the street from the hotel on the fourth floor of Shiner's Furniture on Park Street. KGIR went on the air on January 31, 1929, nearly nine months before the Great Depression of 1929. The first broadcast from KGIR was heard around the town of Butte and Dillon, and as far away as the Pacific Coast. With radio in Butte, listeners enjoyed what they heard on the station, including local bands and singers, in addition to religious programming, to live inauguration of President Herbert Hoover, which was heard locally, and as far away as Ramsay, a small community just west of Butte.

==== East Park Street location ====
The KGIR studios were originally to be located on the roof of Butte's Finlen Hotel, but due to uprisings, the station was not able to assume the hotel as its location. Manager of the Finlen Hotel, Morris Weiss, told Craney the station could not open. It was later found out to be a brush with the politics of The Anaconda Company. In time, talks, and wanting to keep his studios centrally located in the uptown Butte area, Craney began talks with Carl Shiner, of Shiner's Furniture, and was given the go ahead to build his studios on the fourth floor of the furniture store. This location would serve as the home to KGIR for approximately 18 months before a new location was sought.

==== West Broadway Street location ====
After about 18 months, the station moved to its Broadway Street location in Butte, which at that time was the old office of the Senator William Andrews Clark. In more recent times, the building was used as the bus depot, and currently houses CCCS, Incorporated. The station remained at this location until property was acquired by Craney and the station was moved west of town.

==== Nissler Junction location ====
In 1937, KGIR again moved, this time approximately seven miles west of the Butte city limits. Craney would open his new studios just a few miles from the Butte-Anaconda highway with a new transmitter and modern tower. The new location at Nissler Junction not only was the home of the station, but Craney also lived near the studios. Craney lived at Nissler for many years until his health deteriorated.

== Expanding operations beyond Butte and The Z-Bar Network ==
In 1941, Craney applied for KGIR to take over the 660 kHz clear channel then occupied by the New York City flagship of NBC's Red Network, WEAF, with WEAF being downgraded to protect Butte. The request was denied by the FCC.

Before Craney had relocated the KGIR studios to Nissler Junction near Butte, he had been acquiring radio stations from around Montana and making them a part of his Z-Bar Network, which was an old Montana Cattle brand. The stations that Craney purchased were KPFA in Helena and KRBM in Bozeman. With the purchase of station KPFA in Helena, when joined together with KGIR, it led to creation Craney's network. Craney then also went to purchase construction permits for stations in Great Falls and Missoula, both in 1947.

After searching through various radio sources, Craney found that there was a string of call letters that were not in use by the FCC at that time. He found a combination of call letters all containing "XL" letters. Craney then petitioned the FCC to have his Montana stations' call letters changed so that they all have an "XL" sign. The petition was granted, and thus The Z-Bar Network grew to include the Montana stations KXLF (formerly KGIR), KXLJ (formerly KPFA), KXLQ (formerly KRBM), KXLK (allocated KSTR prior to launch), and KXLL. The Z-Bar Network was one of the most successful in Montana history and has left its mark along with Craney's regional broadcast sales office that was also headquartered in Butte, the Pacific Northwest Broadcasters. All five stations in the Z-Bar Network were affiliates of the National Broadcasting Company (NBC).

== Making KGIR successful ==
Butte and the surrounding areas had no local radio station until KGIR went on the air in 1929. It was a new form of entertainment to the people who flooded the studios with messages of thanks and congratulations after the inaugural broadcast. Adding to the success story of KGIR is the fact that the programming was all local until the station became an NBC affiliate on November 28, 1931. After the affiliation, Craney and KGIR continued to run local programming along with network programming. It was through promotions and contests that many listeners were pulled into the shaping of KGIR as many who participated helped with the addition of programming during the Depression year. Listeners were said to have wanted more than just light music and farm reports.

Along with his Z-Bar Network across the state of Montana, Craney also founded The Pacific Northwest Broadcasters, which was an agency to help in assisting the Montana stations with getting advertisement sales from larger cities.

== Television audience growing ==
Craney's venture into radio was a landmark in Montana broadcasting; however, with widening audience of television, Craney brought television to "The Mining City." A man that began the first radio station in Butte, also created Montana's first radio network, went on to create a Butte television station, longtime CBS affiliate KXLF-TV, that was Montana's first, and began Montana's first television network, The Skyline Network, which was the predecessor to the Montana Television Network, ran by Joseph Sample. Although KXLF-TV did have one competitor when it began in 1953, KOPR-TV, would eventually close after 13 months on the air.

== Later life ==
In 1958, Craney created The Greater Montana Foundation, a non-profit charitable organization that is dedicated to "benefiting the people of Montana by encouraging communication, with an emphasis on electronic media, on issues, trends and values of importance to present and future generations of Montanans." Since 1958, due to the continuing contributions from Craney and his estate, The Greater Montana Foundation has granted hundreds of thousands of dollars to worthy broadcasting projects in Montana.

Craney died in Montpelier, Idaho, on April 6, 1991.
