= Four Buttes, Montana =

- Unincorporated community
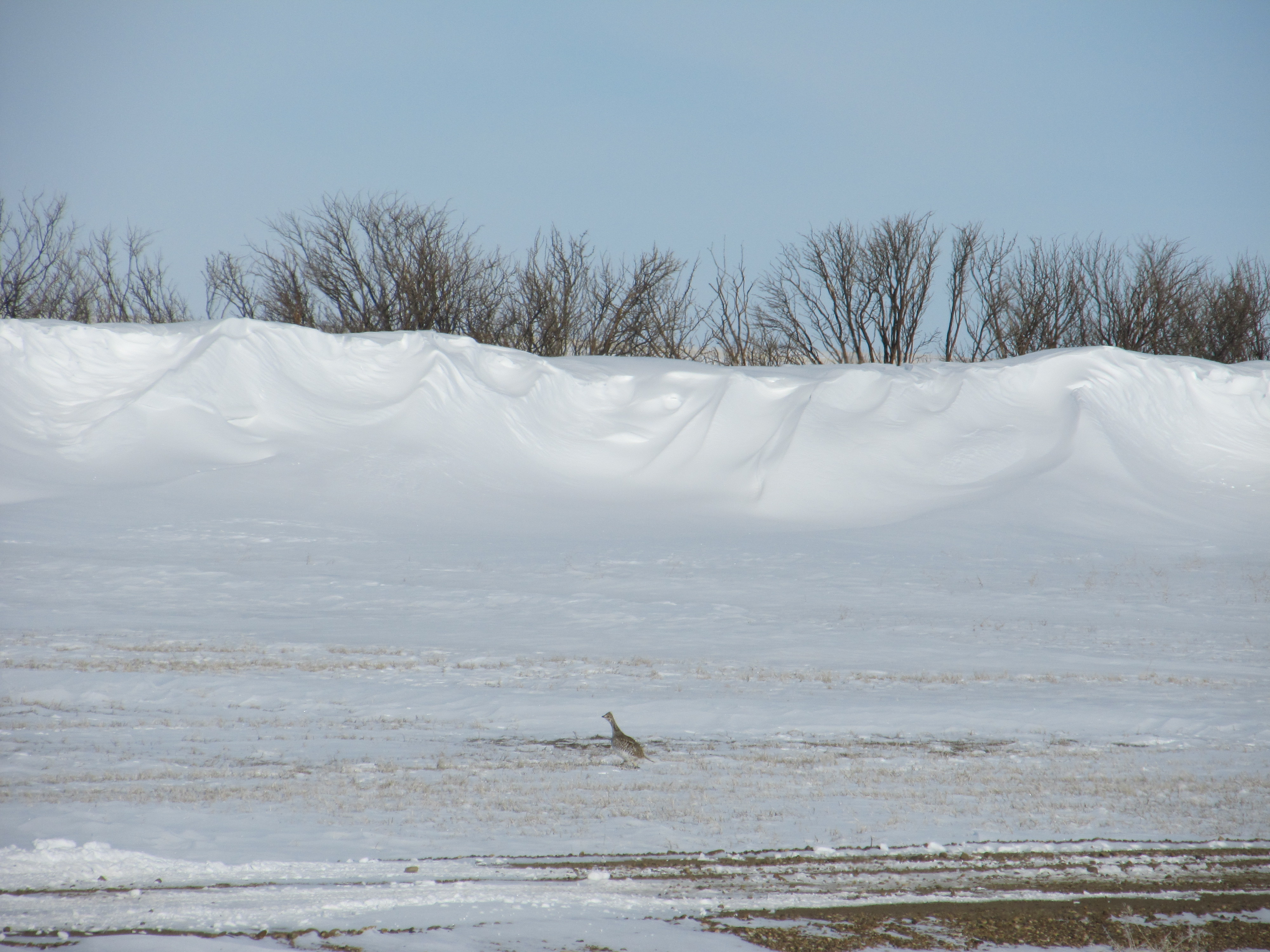
- Wildlife in Four Buttes, Montana

- Location within Montana Location within the United States
- Coordinates: 48°48′35″N 105°36′23″W
- Country: United States
- State: Montana
- County: Daniels
- Elevation: 2,484 ft (757 m)
- Time zone: UTC-7 (Mountain (MST))
  - Summer (DST): UTC-6 (MDT)
- Area code: 406
- GNIS feature ID: 771546

Four Buttes is an unincorporated community in Daniels County, Montana, United States. Four Buttes is located on Secondary Highway 248, 8.5 miles (13.7 km) west of Scobey. The community is named for a group of four large buttes to its west.

Four Buttes was founded in 1926 as a stop on the Great Northern Railway. Residents built a grain elevator along the railroad, allowing area farmers to export their products.
