= KPAX-TV =

Television station in Missoula, Montana

KPAX-TV and KAJJ-CD

KPAX-TV: Missoula, Montana; KAJJ-CD: Kalispell, Montana; United States
- Channels for KPAX-TV: Digital: 25 (UHF); Virtual: 8
- Channels for KAJJ-CD: Digital: 18 (UHF); Virtual: 18
- Branding: KPAX-TV: KPAX 8; MTN News; KAJJ-CD: KAJ 18

Programming
- Network: Montana Television Network
- Affiliations: 8.1/18.1: CBS; 8.2/18.2: MTN; for others, see § Subchannels

Ownership
- Owner: E. W. Scripps Company; (Scripps Broadcasting Holdings LLC)

History
- First air date: KPAX-TV: February 1966 (full-power license dates from May 5, 1970) (Note: Satellite of KXLF-TV until 1977); KAJJ-CD: July 10, 1985
- Former call signs: KAJJ-CD: K18AJ (1985–2011); KAJJ-CA (2011–2012)
- Former channel number: KPAX-TV: Analog: 8 (VHF, 1966–2009); Digital: 7 (VHF, until 2025); KAJJ-CD: Analog: 18 (UHF, 1985–2012)
- Former affiliations: KPAX-TV: ABC (secondary 1966–1976 and 1984–1990, primary 1976–1984); The CW (8.2, 2006–2023)

Technical information
- Licensing authority: FCC
- Facility ID: KPAX-TV: 35455; KAJJ-CD: 35453
- Class: KAJJ-CD: CD
- ERP: KPAX-TV: 600 kW; KAJJ-CD: 9.55 kW
- HAAT: KPAX-TV: 653.5 m (2,144 ft); KAJJ-CD: 805 m (2,641 ft)
- Transmitter coordinates: KPAX-TV: 47°1′2.1″N 114°0′50.5″W; KAJJ-CD: 48°8′48″N 114°21′58″W
- Translator: see § Translators

Links
- Public license information: KPAX-TV: Public file; LMS; KAJJ-CD: Public file; LMS
- Website: KPAX-TV: www.kpax.com; KAJJ-CD: www.kpax.com/news/local-news/flathead-county

KPAX-TV (channel 8) in Missoula, Montana, and KAJJ-CD (channel 18) in Kalispell, Montana, are television stations serving as the CBS affiliates for Western Montana. Owned by the E. W. Scripps Company, they are part of the Montana Television Network, a statewide network of CBS-affiliated stations. KPAX-TV's studios are located on Regent Street in Missoula, and its transmitter is located on TV Mountain north of the city.

KAJJ operates as a low-power, Class A semi-satellite of KPAX-TV for the Flathead; known on-air as KAJ, it broadcasts the same schedule as KPAX, but with local commercials and news segments. To comply with the requirements of its Class A license, KAJJ also produces its own weeknight 5:30 and 10 p.m. newscasts with a separate anchor, which premiered in 2010.

KPAX-TV evolved from a translator of sister station KXLF-TV from Butte that opened in February 1966. It was upgraded to a full-power satellite of KXLF on May 5, 1970. It separated from KXLF to become Missoula's second locally-focused station in 1977, a year after following KXLF in switching primary affiliations from CBS to ABC. It returned to CBS in 1984. The Kalispell repeater began as an independent low-powered station in 1985, and joined KPAX as a Flathead-area semi-satellite in 1988.

== History ==
The signal of KXLF-TV in Butte had been received in Missoula since 1958, when a local group set up a translator on channel 11 west of the city. KXLF-TV itself was approved to set up a translator in Missoula in December 1965, at the same time that KMSO-TV of Missoula was allowed to build a translator in Butte, which began broadcasting in February 1966.

Joe Sample, owner of the Montana Television Network (MTN), applied to replace the KXLF-TV translator with a full-power satellite for Missoula on October 15, 1969, through subsidiary Garryowen Butte TV. The Federal Communications Commission (FCC) granted the construction permit on December 23. KPAX-TV went on the air in two phases: provisionally from a 20-foot (6.1 m) tower operating at 5,000 watts on May 9, 1970, and from its full-power 257,000-watt facility on June 5.

In January 1977, Sample remodeled a former television and appliance store on Regent Street into a local studio for KPAX. This allowed the station to sever the electronic umbilical cord with KXLF and begin the production of local news and commercials in the city, becoming Missoula's second full-fledged station. The year before, KXLF-KPAX, long a primary CBS affiliate, became a primary ABC affiliate, with CBS being shared with KGVO-TV/KTVM-TV in the Missoula and Butte areas.

In 1984, Sample sold the MTN stations to SJL, Inc. for $20 million. The network became exclusively affiliated with CBS that year; as a result, ABC programming for Missoula-Kalispell and Butte-Bozeman moved to the Eagle Communications network (KECI, KTVM, and KCFW), which signed an affiliation agreement with the network to air it alongside NBC.

MTN was split two years later when the stations outside Billings, including KPAX-TV, were sold to Evening Post Publishing Company, through its Cordillera Communications subsidiary, for $24 million in 1986. The hybrid local-state news format that had been used at MTN since 1971 was abolished, with each station beginning to produce full-length local newscasts.

While MTN was changing owners, a low-power TV station was going on the air at Kalispell. Owned by Thom Curtis and Daniel Coon of Billings, stockholders in KOUS-TV in Hardin, K18AJ made its debut on July 10, 1985, and primarily aired programming from the Satellite Program Network. It went silent in mid-1988 and was sold to KPAX-TV, returning to the air in November as a translator with local commercials. In addition, a news reporter was stationed full-time in the Kalispell area; separate evening newscasts have been produced since 2000 for Kalispell. The call sign was altered to KAJJ-CA in 2011 and KAJJ-CD in 2012.

KECI-TV with KCFW in Kalispell generally had the lead in local news in the Missoula market until KPAX-TV surpassed it in 1993, aided by the defection of anchor Jill Valley from KECI. The station began producing a local morning newscast in 1996.

== Technical information ==
=== Subchannels ===
KPAX-TV's and KAJJ-CD's signals are multiplexed with the same subchannels:

Subchannels of KPAX-TV and KAJJ-CD
Subchannel		Res.	Short name		Programming
KPAX-TV	KAJJ-CD	Res.	KPAX-TV	KAJJ-CD	Programming
8.1	18.1	1080i	KPAX	KAJ-CBS	CBS
8.2	18.2	720p	MTN		Montana Television Network
8.3	18.3	480i	GRIT-TV		Grit
8.4	18.4	480i	ION TV		Ion
8.5	18.5	480i	CourtTV		Court TV
8.6	18.6	480i	BUSTED		Busted
8.7	18.7	480i	MVSGLD		MovieSphere Gold

=== Translators ===
In addition to KAJJ-CD, KPAX-TV has 23 other dependent translators in north-central and northern Montana.

- Big Arm: K11RX-D
- Bitterroot Range: K11IL-D
- Drummond: K20KL-D
- Ferndale: K12LO-D
- Leadore, ID: K11BD-D, K25PY-D
- Lemhi, etc., ID: K05BE-D, K34CB-D
- Libby: K22KS-D
- Phillipsburg: K17JS-D
- Plains-Paradise: K05GM-D
- Polson: K11HO-D
- St. Regis: K10HM
- Salmon, ID: K08PI-D, K32NQ-D
- Sula: K03IA-D
- Superior: K11FF-D
- Thompson Falls: K07FL-D, K17MQ-D
- Trout Creek, etc.: K08OZ-D
- West Glacier: K10LH-D
- Woods Bay: K22MG-D

=== Analog-to-digital conversion ===
KPAX-TV shut down its analog signal, over VHF channel 8, on June 12, 2009, the official date on which full-power television stations in the United States transitioned from analog to digital broadcasts under federal mandate. The station's digital signal remained on its pre-transition VHF channel 7, using virtual channel 8.
