= Tampico, Montana =

Tampico, Montana Tampico
- Ghost town
- Location of Tampico in Montana Tampico (the United States)
- Coordinates: 48°18′19″N 106°49′32″W
- Country: United States
- State: Montana
- County: Valley
- Elevation: 2,142 ft (653 m)
- GNIS feature ID: 1819609

Tampico is an unincorporated community and ghost town in Valley County, Montana, United States, located between Glasgow and Hinsdale. It was originally founded as a stopping point to provide water for steam locomotives on the Great Northern Railway. Coinciding with the Enlarged Homestead Act of 1909, the town became a minor hub for local agriculture. The town also housed workers for the 1917 construction of the Vandalia Diversion Dam which was used for irrigation from the Milk River.

Tampico received fewer visitors after Highway 2 was moved north. The town's Post Office was closed in 1973, and the school closed in 1977.
