= Whitewater, Montana =

- Census-designated place
- Location within Montana
- Coordinates: 48°45′33″N 107°37′18″W
- Country: United States
- State: Montana
- County: Phillips

Area
  - Total: 1.06 sq mi (2.75 km^{2})
  - Land: 1.06 sq mi (2.75 km^{2})
  - Water: 0 sq mi (0.00 km^{2})
- Elevation: 2,372 ft (723 m)

Population (2020)
  - Total: 75
  - Density: 70.7/sq mi (27.28/km^{2})
- Time zone: UTC-7 (Mountain (MST))
  - Summer (DST): UTC-6 (MDT)
- ZIP code: 59544
- Area code: 406
- GNIS feature ID: 2583867

Whitewater is a census-designated place and unincorporated community in Phillips County, Montana, United States. As of the 2020 census, Whitewater had a population of 75. Whitewater has a post office with ZIP code 59544.

In 1927, the town moved about 7 miles west to be on the new Great Northern Railway branch line.

== Demographics ==
Historical population
| Census | Pop. | Note | %± |
|---|---|---|---|
| 2020 | 75 | | — |
U.S. Decennial Census

== Climate ==
According to the Köppen Climate Classification system, Whitewater has a semi-arid climate, abbreviated "BSk" on climate maps.

Climate data for Whitewater, Montana, 1991–2020 normals
| Month | Jan | Feb | Mar | Apr | May | Jun | Jul | Aug | Sep | Oct | Nov | Dec | Year |
|---|---|---|---|---|---|---|---|---|---|---|---|---|---|
| Average precipitation inches (mm) | 0.52 (13) | 0.28 (7.1) | 0.39 (9.9) | 1.00 (25) | 1.84 (47) | 2.78 (71) | 1.34 (34) | 1.35 (34) | 1.17 (30) | 0.89 (23) | 0.52 (13) | 0.44 (11) | 12.52 (318) |
| Average snowfall inches (cm) | 1.4 (3.6) | 2.4 (6.1) | 0.8 (2.0) | 0.4 (1.0) | 0.3 (0.76) | 0.0 (0.0) | 0.0 (0.0) | 0.0 (0.0) | 0.0 (0.0) | 0.8 (2.0) | 2.0 (5.1) | 1.8 (4.6) | 9.9 (25.16) |
| Average precipitation days (≥ 0.01 in) | 4. | 3.8 | 3.5 | 4.9 | 6.5 | 8.2 | 5.7 | 4.1 | 4.6 | 3.6 | 3.7 | 3.8 | 56.4 |
| Average snowy days (≥ 0.1 in) | 0.9 | 1.7 | 0.7 | 0.2 | 0.1 | 0.0 | 0.0 | 0.0 | 0.1 | 0.4 | 1.1 | 0.9 | 6.1 |
Source: NOAA

== Education ==
Whitewater School District educates students from kindergarten through 12th grade. Whitewater High School's team name is the Penguins.
