= Dodson, Montana =

Dodson, Montana Cʿaȟní Aʾókana or Mąkʿásaba Okʾé (Assiniboine)
- Town
- Location of Dodson, Montana

- Location in the United States
- Coordinates: 48°23′45″N 108°14′58″W
- Country: United States
- State: Montana
- County: Phillips

Area
  - Total: 0.17 sq mi (0.43 km^{2})
  - Land: 0.17 sq mi (0.43 km^{2})
  - Water: 0 sq mi (0.00 km^{2})
- Elevation: 2,284 ft (696 m)

Population (2020)
  - Total: 125
  - Density: 752.4/sq mi (290.51/km^{2})
- Time zone: UTC-7 (Mountain (MST))
  - Summer (DST): UTC-6 (MDT)
- ZIP code: 59524
- Area code: 406
- FIPS code: 30-21025
- GNIS feature ID: 2412438

Dodson is a town in Phillips County, Montana, United States. The population was 125 at the 2020 census.

== History ==
Dodson was named for Great Northern Railway engineer Thomas Henry Dodson. Other sources attribute the name to the owner of the trading post and saloon established before the railroad came through. The first post office was established in 1891, closed the same year, then reopened in 1894. In 1909 the town flourished due to the Milk River Irrigation Project.

The current economy is supported by large ranches and farms.

== Geography ==
According to the United States Census Bureau, the town has a total area of 0.19 square miles (0.49 km^{2}), all land. Dodson is near Fort Belknap Indian Reservation, located between the Milk River and Little Rocky Mountains. It is home to the Gros Ventre and Assiniboine tribes.

=== Climate ===
According to the Köppen Climate Classification system, Dodson has a semi-arid climate, abbreviated "BSk" on climate maps.

== Demographics ==
Historical population
Census	Pop.	Note	%±
1920	365		—
1930	249		−31.8%
1940	397		59.4%
1950	330		−16.9%
1960	313		−5.2%
1970	196		−37.4%
1980	158		−19.4%
1990	137		−13.3%
2000	122		−10.9%
2010	124		1.6%
2020	125		0.8%
U.S. Decennial Census

=== 2010 census ===
As of the census of 2010, there were 124 people, 49 households, and 32 families residing in the town. The population density was 652.6 inhabitants per square mile (252.0/km^{2}). There were 71 housing units at an average density of 373.7 per square mile (144.3/km^{2}). The racial makeup of the town was 41.9% White, 49.2% Native American, 2.4% from other races, and 6.5% from two or more races. Hispanic or Latino of any race were 6.5% of the population.

There were 49 households, of which 38.8% had children under the age of 18 living with them, 40.8% were married couples living together, 16.3% had a female householder with no husband present, 8.2% had a male householder with no wife present, and 34.7% were non-families. 32.7% of all households were made up of individuals, and 12.3% had someone living alone who was 65 years of age or older. The average household size was 2.53 and the average family size was 3.16.

The median age in the town was 35.5 years. 32.3% of residents were under the age of 18; 6.4% were between the ages of 18 and 24; 21.7% were from 25 to 44; 15.2% were from 45 to 64; and 24.2% were 65 years of age or older. The gender makeup of the town was 54.8% male and 45.2% female.

=== 2000 census ===
As of the census of 2000, there were 122 people, 49 households, and 34 families residing in the town. The population density was 648.4 inhabitants per square mile (250.3/km^{2}). There were 66 housing units at an average density of 350.8 per square mile (135.4/km^{2}). The racial makeup of the town was 50.00% White, 45.08% Native American, 0.82% Asian, and 4.10% from two or more races. Hispanic or Latino of any race were 2.46% of the population.

There were 49 households, out of which 40.8% had children under the age of 18 living with them, 49.0% were married couples living together, 14.3% had a female householder with no husband present, and 28.6% were non-families. 28.6% of all households were made up of individuals, and 20.4% had someone living alone who was 65 years of age or older. The average household size was 2.49 and the average family size was 2.97.

In the town, the population was spread out, with 33.6% under the age of 18, 4.9% from 18 to 24, 20.5% from 25 to 44, 19.7% from 45 to 64, and 21.3% who were 65 years of age or older. The median age was 39 years. For every 100 females, there were 87.7 males. For every 100 females age 18 and over, there were 76.1 males.

The median income for a household in the town was $19,464, and the median income for a family was $33,750. Males had a median income of $21,250 versus $33,125 for females. The per capita income for the town was $10,187. There were 23.7% of families and 28.9% of the population living below the poverty line, including 44.7% of under eighteens and 11.1% of those over 64.

== Arts and culture ==
Dodson is the location of the Phillips County Fair, which claims to be the longest-running fair in Montana.

== Government ==
Dodson has a mayor and town council. Frank "Skip" Cole ran unopposed in the November 2025 election for mayor. He replaced Angel Arocha who originally was appointed mayor in May 2021 to finish the remainder of Terri Cole's term. Arocha ran against Glenn A. Dolphay in the November 2021 election, winning by two votes.

== Education ==
Dodson School District educates students from kindergarten through 12th grade. Dodson High School's team name is the Coyotes.

== Media ==
The Phillips County News is a weekly local newspaper. They provide a printed paper as well as news online.

== Transportation ==
Amtrak’s Empire Builder, which operates between Seattle/Portland and Chicago, passes through the town on BNSF tracks, but makes no stop. The nearest station is located in Malta, 18 miles (29 km) to the east.

== See also ==
- List of municipalities in Montana
