= WPRO =

WPRO may refer to:

- WPRO (AM), a radio station (630 kHz) licensed to Providence, Rhode Island, United States
- WPRO-FM, a radio station (92.3 MHz) licensed to Providence
- WPRI-TV, a television station (channel 12) licensed to Providence, which held the call sign WPRO-TV until 1967
- the World Health Organization's Regional Office for Western Pacific
