= WFCI =

WFCI may refer to:

- WPAW (Rhode Island), a defunct radio station which held the call sign WFCI from 1926 until 1928
- WPJB, a defunct radio station in Providence, Rhode Island which held the call sign WFCI from 1941 to 1952
- WSOM, a radio station (89.5 FM) licensed to Franklin, Indiana, which held the call sign WFCI from 1960 to 2022
