= Walter Cryan =

Walter Cryan (born 1932) is a former announcer and veteran news reporter and anchor for WLNE-TV and WPRI-TV in Providence, Rhode Island, with a career of more than 50 years.

He graduated from Boston University with a Bachelor of Science Degree in Communications. In 1956, Cryan went to work in Attleboro at WARA radio and joined WPRO radio in Providence in 1965. He also was the voice of the old Foxboro racetrack from 1963 to 1985. Cryan became the lead newsreader for WPRI-TV in 1965 and was paired throughout his 30 years there with partners like Doug White, Mike Gorman, Janice Glynn or Karen Adams. He retired in 2000, but returned to television in 2004 to work as the 6 p.m. anchor at WLNE-TV. His definitive retirement came in 2007.

== Personal life ==
Walter and his wife, Ruth, have nine children. They reside in North Attleboro, Massachusetts.
