= WPAW (disambiguation) =

WPAW is a radio station (93.1 FM) licensed to Greensboro, North Carolina.

WPAW may also refer to:

- WPAW (Rhode Island) a defunct radio station licensed to Pawtucket, Rhode Island, which held the call sign WPAW from 1926 to 1932
- WPRO (AM), a radio station (630 AM) licensed to Providence, Rhode Island, which held the call sign WPRO-WPAW from 1932 to 1933
- WSJW, a radio station (550 AM) licensed to Pawtucket, Rhode Island, which held the call sign WPAW from 1950 to 1961
- WSIV, a radio station (1540 AM) licensed to East Syracuse, New York, which held the call sign WPAW from 1965 to 1974
- WSEA, a radio station (100.3 FM) licensed to Atlantic Beach, South Carolina, which held the call sign WPAW from 1991 to 1993
- WJKD, a radio station (99.7 FM) licensed to Vero Beach, Florida, which held the call sign WPAW from 1995 to 2001
