= Channel 12 virtual TV stations in the United States =

The following television stations operate on virtual channel 12 in the United States:

- K03CS-D in Broadus, Montana
- K04PJ-D in Hesperus, Colorado
- K05GQ-D in Kooskia, Idaho
- K07AAI-D in Reno, Nevada
- K08PF-D in Leamington, Utah
- K08PJ-D in Cedar City, Utah
- K08PK-D in Bullhead City, Arizona
- K09JG-D in Malta, Montana
- K10AD-D in Vallecito, Colorado
- K11HE-D in Jordan, etc., Montana
- K11KO-D in Kamiah, Idaho
- K11WM-D in Townsend, Montana
- K12MD-D in Sleetmute, Alaska
- K12XO-D in Midland/Odessa, Texas
- K13AAQ-D in Prineville, etc., Oregon
- K14IO-D in Pierre, South Dakota
- K14SB-D in Terrace Lakes, Idaho
- K15AS-D in Saco, Montana
- K15BP-D in Grants Pass, Oregon
- K15DS-D in Newport, etc., Oregon
- K15KJ-D in Gold Hill, Oregon
- K16DL-D in Zuni Pueblo, New Mexico
- K16LN-D in Pendleton, Oregon
- K16LP-D in Paradise, California
- K17BA-D in Yreka, California
- K17GV-D in Rainier, Oregon
- K17JI-D in Fresno, California
- K17OE-D in Colorado Springs, Colorado
- K18GU-D in Ottumwa, Iowa
- K18KT-D in Chinook, Montana
- K19GA-D in Susanville, etc., California
- K19KX-D in Keokuk, Iowa
- K19LP-D in Clovis, New Mexico
- K20BP-D in Phillips County, Montana
- K20GT-D in Indian Village, New Mexico
- K20HT-D in Rockaway Beach, Oregon
- K20OG-D in Cortez, etc., Colorado
- K21BG-D in Jacksonville, Oregon
- K21DE-D in Seaside-Astoria, Oregon
- K21EG-D in Golden Valley, Arizona
- K21LW-D in Gazelle, California
- K21OD-D in Many Farms, Arizona
- K21OG-D in Bayfield, Colorado
- K22LY-D in Baker Valley, Oregon
- K22MF-D in Red Lake, Minnesota
- K22NW-D in Boulder, Colorado
- K22NX-D in Juliaetta, Idaho
- K23AA-D in Beatrice, Nebraska
- K23DK-D in Meadview, Arizona
- K23HT-D in St. Maries, Idaho
- K24GO-D in Blair, Nebraska
- K24IM-D in Keosauqua, Iowa
- K25GE-D in Durango, Colorado
- K25OG-D in Falls City, Nebraska
- K25PJ-D in Chloride, Arizona
- K25MK-D in Camp Verde, Arizona
- K25MZ-D in Conrad, Montana
- K25NZ-D in Lewiston, Idaho
- K25OJ-D in La Grande, Oregon
- K25OP-D in Kellogg, Idaho
- K26GF-D in Peach Springs, Arizona
- K26NQ-D in Hood River, Oregon
- K26OD-D in Globe, Arizona
- K27OR-D in Klagetoh, Arizona
- K28CQ-D in Hood River, Oregon
- K28GT-D in Crownpoint, New Mexico
- K28JD-D in Fort Madison, Iowa
- K28OV-D in Madras, Oregon
- K28PO-D in Lake Havasu City, Arizona
- K29KD-D in Delta, Utah
- K29NI-D in Cave Junction, Oregon
- K29NO-D in The Dalles, Oregon
- K30EK-D in Dulce & Lumberton, New Mexico
- K30EW-D in Monument, etc., Oregon
- K30LC-D in Tampico, etc., Montana
- K30MW-D in Sweetgrass, etc., Montana
- K31NT-D in Jackson, Minnesota
- K31OI-D in Beryl, Modena etc., Utah
- K31PS-D in Lakeshore, California
- K32DK-D in Watertown, South Dakota
- K33AC-D in Pawnee City, Nebraska
- K33FS-D in La Grande, Oregon
- K33PR-D in Joplin, Montana
- K34DN-D in Whitewater, Montana
- K34NS-D in Milton-Freewater, Oregon
- K34PK-D in Tohatchi, New Mexico
- K35CR-D in Tillamook, etc., Oregon
- K35EI-D in Dolan Springs, Arizona
- K35FO-D in Milton-Freewater, Oregon
- K35JX-D in Westwood, California
- K35MJ-D in Grangeville, Idaho
- K35MX-D in Kingman, Arizona
- K35NT-D in Parowan/Enoch/Para, Utah
- K36CW-D in Dodson, Montana
- K36HM-D in Fort Dick, California
- K36LZ-D in Garden Valley, Idaho
- K36PV-D in Gallup, New Mexico
- K36PY-D in Pagosa Springs, Colorado
- K36QB-D in Cortez, Colorado
- KAMU-TV in College Station, Texas
- KBDI-TV in Broomfield, Colorado
- KBMT in Beaumont, Texas
- KCCW-TV in Walker, Minnesota
- KCOY-TV in Santa Maria, California
- KDRV in Medford, Oregon
- KETZ in El Dorado, Arkansas
- KEYC-TV in Mankato, Minnesota
- KFVS-TV in Cape Girardeau, Missouri
- KGTF in Hagåtña, Guam
- KHLM-LD in Houston, Texas
- KHSL-TV in Chico, California
- KIIN in Iowa City, Iowa
- KJOU-LD in Bakersfield, California
- KMAU in Wailuku, Hawaii
- KMBT-LD in Salinas, California
- KMYU in St. George, Utah
- KNRR in Pembina, North Dakota
- KOBF in Farmington, New Mexico
- KODE-TV in Joplin, Missouri
- KOPA-CD in Gillette, Wyoming
- KPNX in Mesa, Arizona
- KPSN-LD in Payson, Arizona
- KPTV in Portland, Oregon
- KQSL-LD in San Rafael, California
- KRNE-TV in Merriman, Nebraska
- KSAT-TV in San Antonio, Texas
- KSGW-TV in Sheridan, Wyoming
- KSLA in Shreveport, Louisiana
- KSQA in Topeka, Kansas
- KTBV-LD in Los Angeles, California
- KTRV-TV in Nampa, Idaho
- KTVH-DT in Helena, Montana
- KTWC-LD in Crockett, Texas
- KTXE-LD in San Angelo, Texas
- KTXS-TV in Sweetwater, Texas
- KUID-TV in Moscow, Idaho
- KUIL-LD in Beaumont, Texas
- KUON-TV in Lincoln, Nebraska
- KUTF in Logan, Utah
- KVHP-LD in Jasper, Texas
- KVIH-TV in Clovis, New Mexico
- KVOS-TV in Bellingham, Washington
- KWCH-DT in Hutchinson, Kansas
- KWET in Cheyenne, Oklahoma
- KXII in Sherman, Texas
- KXIP-LD in Paris, Texas
- KXMB-TV in Bismarck, North Dakota
- KYAV-LD in Palm Springs, California
- KZNO-LD in Big Bear Lake, California
- W05AW-D in Christiansted, U.S. Virgin Islands
- W16EL-D in Augusta, Georgia
- W20EW-D in Augusta, Georgia
- W21CX-D in Mayaguez, Puerto Rico
- W33ER-D in Augusta, Georgia
- W35DV-D in Augusta, Georgia
- WBNG-TV in Binghamton, New York
- WBOY-TV in Clarksburg, West Virginia
- WBPA-LD in Pittsburgh, Pennsylvania
- WBQP-CD in Pensacola, Florida
- WCTI-TV in New Bern, North Carolina
- WDEF-TV in Chattanooga, Tennessee
- WDNV-LD in Athens, Georgia
- WHDC-LD in Charleston, South Carolina
- WHYY-TV in Wilmington, Delaware
- WICU-TV in Erie, Pennsylvania
- WILL-TV in Urbana, Illinois
- WINM in Angola, Indiana
- WISN-TV in Milwaukee, Wisconsin
- WJFW-TV in Rhinelander, Wisconsin
- WJRT-TV in Flint, Michigan
- WJTV in Jackson, Mississippi
- WKRC-TV in Cincinnati, Ohio
- WMAE-TV in Booneville, Mississippi
- WMEB-TV in Orono, Maine
- WOLE-DT in Aguadilla, Puerto Rico
- WPEC in West Palm Beach, Florida
- WPRI-TV in Providence, Rhode Island
- WPRQ-LD in Clarksdale, Mississippi
- WRDW-TV in Augusta, Georgia
- WSFA in Montgomery, Alabama
- WTJX-TV in Charlotte Amalie, U.S. Virgin Islands
- WTLV in Jacksonville, Florida
- WWBT in Richmond, Virginia
- WWDG-CD in Utica, New York
- WXII-LD in Cedar, Michigan
- WXII-TV in Winston-Salem, North Carolina
- WYES-TV in New Orleans, Louisiana

The following stations, which are no longer licensed, formerly operated on virtual channel 12:

- K04DD-D in Weaverville, California
- K09WP-D in Checkerboard, Montana
- K17LN-D in Gold Beach, Oregon
- K20BI-D in Nesika Beach, Oregon
- K22LB-D in Squaw Valley, Oregon
- K27JJ-D in Forbes/Jasper County, Texas
- K40IK-D in Wallowa, Oregon
- K43NZ-D in Port Orford, Oregon
- KBMT-LD in Beaumont, Texas
