= Channel 12 digital TV stations in the United States =

The following television stations broadcast on digital channel 12 in the United States:

- K12AK-D in Crested Butte, Colorado, on virtual channel 7, which rebroadcasts K11AT-D
- K12AL-D in Waunita Hot Springs, Colorado, on virtual channel 7, which rebroadcasts K25PT-D
- K12AV-D in Pateros/Mansfield, Washington
- K12BA-D in Winthrop-Twisp, Washington
- K12BE-D in Orondo, etc., Washington
- K12CV-D in Riverside, Washington
- K12CW-D in Malott/Wakefield, Washington
- K12CX-D in Tonasket, Washington
- K12DE-D in Lund & Preston, Nevada
- K12FB-D in Saco, Montana
- K12GP-D in Dodson, Montana
- K12JJ-D in Benbow, etc., California
- K12LA-D in Kenai, etc., Alaska
- K12LF-D in Coolin, Idaho
- K12LI-D in Thayne, etc., Wyoming
- K12LO-D in Ferndale, Montana
- K12LS-D in Challis, Idaho
- K12LU-D in West Glacier, etc., Montana
- K12LV-D in Dryden, Washington
- K12LX-D in Powderhorn, Colorado, on virtual channel 9
- K12MD-D in Sleetmute, Alaska
- K12MI-D in Laketown, etc., Utah, on virtual channel 5, which rebroadcasts KSL-TV
- K12MM-D in Girdwood Valley, Alaska
- K12MS-D in Elko, Nevada
- K12MW-D in Manhattan, Nevada
- K12NH-D in Hobbs, New Mexico
- K12OC-D in Red River, New Mexico
- K12OF-D in Bullhead City, Arizona
- K12OG-D in Taos, New Mexico
- K12PT-D in Ryndon, Nevada
- K12QH-D in Dolores, Colorado
- K12QM-D in Thomasville, Colorado
- K12QQ-D in Cedar City, Utah, on virtual channel 14, which rebroadcasts KJZZ-TV
- K12QS-D in Mink Creek, Idaho, on virtual channel 14, which rebroadcasts KJZZ-TV
- K12QT-D in Trout Creek, etc., Montana
- K12QW-D in Silver City, New Mexico
- K12QY-D in Leamington, Utah
- K12RA-D in Colstrip, Montana
- K12RD-D in Coulee City, Washington
- K12RE-D in Denton, Montana
- K12RF-D in Healy, etc., Alaska
- K12WZ-D in Long Valley Junction, Utah
- K12XA-D in Abilene, Texas
- K12XB-D in Eureka Springs, Arkansas
- K12XC-D in Salina & Redmond, Utah
- K12XD-D in Aurora, etc., Utah
- K12XE-D in Woodland, Utah
- K12XG-D in Roosevelt, Utah, on virtual channel 11, which rebroadcasts KBYU-TV
- K12XH-D in Price, Utah, on virtual channel 11, which rebroadcasts KBYU-TV
- K12XI-D in Helper, Utah
- K12XJ-D in Modesto, California, on virtual channel 49
- K12XK-D in Denver, Colorado, on virtual channel 27
- K12XO-D in Midland/Odessa, Texas
- K12XP-D in Phoenix, Arizona
- K12XQ-D in Monroe, Louisiana
- KAMU-TV in College Station/Bryan, Texas
- KBMT in Beaumont, Texas
- KCCW-TV in Walker, Minnesota, on virtual channel 12
- KCWY-DT in Casper, Wyoming
- KDOC-TV in Anaheim, California, on virtual channel 56
- KDRV in Medford, Oregon
- KEYC-TV in Mankato, Minnesota
- KGEB in Tulsa, Oklahoma
- KGO-TV in San Francisco, California, on virtual channel 7
- KGTF in Hagåtña, Guam
- KIIN in Iowa City, Iowa
- KJJM-LD in Dallas & Mesquite, Texas, on virtual channel 34
- KJKZ-LD in Fresno, California
- KJOU-LD in Bakersfield, California
- KKCO in Grand Junction, Colorado
- KMAU in Wailuku, Hawaii
- KMBT-LD in Salinas, California
- KNRR in Pembina, North Dakota
- KOBF in Farmington, New Mexico
- KPTV in Portland, Oregon, to move to channel 21, on virtual channel 12
- KRJR-LD in Sacramento, California
- KRNE-TV in Merriman, Nebraska
- KRNV-DT in Reno, Nevada
- KSAT-TV in San Antonio, Texas
- KSCW-DT in Wichita, Kansas
- KSNK in McCook, Nebraska
- KSQA in Topeka, Kansas
- KSVC-LD in Marysvale, Utah
- KTHV in Little Rock, Arkansas
- KTTM in Huron, South Dakota
- KTVH-DT in Helena, Montana
- KUID-TV in Moscow, Idaho
- KUON-TV in Lincoln, Nebraska
- KUSE-LD in Seattle, Washington, on virtual channel 46
- KUTF in Logan, Utah, on virtual channel 12
- KVGA-LD in Las Vegas, Nevada
- KVIH-TV in Clovis, New Mexico
- KXII in Sherman, Texas
- KXMB-TV in Bismarck, North Dakota
- KYAV-LD in Palm Springs, California
- KYUR in Anchorage, Alaska
- W12AQ-D in Black Mountain, North Carolina, on virtual channel 13, which rebroadcasts WLOS
- W12AR-D in Waynesville, etc., North Carolina
- W12CI-D in Hot Springs, North Carolina, on virtual channel 13, which rebroadcasts WLOS
- W12DI-D in Key West, Florida, on virtual channel 8, which rebroadcasts WGEN-TV
- WBAL-TV in Baltimore, Maryland, on virtual channel 11
- WBBM-TV in Chicago, Illinois, on virtual channel 2
- WBOY-TV in Clarksburg, West Virginia
- WBPA-LD in Pittsburgh, Pennsylvania, on virtual channel 12
- WBQP-CD in Pensacola, Florida
- WCIQ in Mount Cheaha, Alabama
- WCQA-LD in Springfield, Illinois
- WDNV-LD in Atlanta, Georgia, on virtual channel 12
- WEHT in Evansville, Indiana
- WFXL in Albany, Georgia
- WGBS-LD in Carrollton, Virginia
- WHDC-LD in Charleston, South Carolina
- WICU-TV in Erie, Pennsylvania
- WINM in Angola, Indiana
- WJRT-TV in Flint, Michigan
- WJTV in Jackson, Mississippi
- WKRC-TV in Cincinnati, Ohio, on virtual channel 12
- WMFD-TV in Mansfield, Ohio
- WNAC-TV in Providence, Rhode Island
- WNCT-TV in Greenville, North Carolina
- WNDT-CD in Manhattan, New York, uses WNET's spectrum, on virtual channel 14
- WNET in Newark, New Jersey, on virtual channel 13
- WNYT in Albany, New York
- WOLE-DT in Aguadilla, Puerto Rico, on virtual channel 12
- WPRQ-LD in Clarksdale, Mississippi
- WPTV-TV in West Palm Beach, Florida
- WRDW-TV in Augusta, Georgia
- WSOC-CR in Shelby, North Carolina, on virtual channel 9, which rebroadcasts WSOC-TV and WAXN-TV
- WSOC-TV (DRT) in Statesville, North Carolina, on virtual channel 9
- WTVT in Tampa, Florida, on virtual channel 13
- WVPT in Staunton, Virginia, to move to channel 15
- WVPY in New Market, Virginia, uses WVPT's spectrum, to move to channel 15
- WYMT-TV in Hazard, Kentucky
- WYOU in Scranton, Pennsylvania

The following stations, which are no longer licensed, formerly broadcast on digital channel 12:

- K12AA-D in Troy, Montana
- K12BF-D in Ardenvoir, Washington
- K12OV-D in Shelter Cove, California
- K12QO-D in Aspen, Colorado
- K12QZ-D in San Luis Obispo, California
- KWVG-LD in Malaga, etc., Washington
