= Andy Gresh =

American sports broadcaster (born 1974)

- Born: Andrew F. Gresh III; October 26, 1974 (age 51); Brownsville, Pennsylvania, United States
- Education: University of Rhode Island
- Website: Official site

Andrew F. Gresh III (born October 26, 1974) is an American sports broadcaster in New England. His coverage includes both professional and college football. Andy was the midday host, along with Christian Fauria at WEEI in Boston until August 2024, when he and Fauria were let go by the station. He was formerly a co-host with Scott Zolak on WBZ-FM in Boston. Also he formerly worked as a host and game analyst for the New England Patriots Radio Network pregame show, and appeared regularly on CSNNE's former program Sports Tonight.

== Career ==
Gresh grew up in Brownsville, Pennsylvania, where his father worked as a coalminer. He went on to receive a degree in journalism from the University of Rhode Island in 1997 and played football in college for the Rhode Island Rams. Andy Gresh married the daughter of an ESPN executive who got him started in the industry.

While in college, Gresh was an intern for various sports radio stations including WFAN in New York City and ESPN Radio in Bristol, Connecticut. In 1997, he left ESPN Radio for WPRO in Providence to become an on-air personality for their morning sports show The Score. In the mid-2000s Gresh was a regular on-air personality on WSKO 790 AM, an all-sports ESPN radio affiliate in Rhode Island.

His career was interrupted when WSKO abruptly changed its format on March 10, 2008, and laid off all its on-air personalities. Due to his experience there and at WPRO, both WFAN and ESPN Radio rehired him. He worked at ESPN Radio in 2007 and 2008 and was the host of the Andy Gresh Show, which aired exclusively on the weekend. He has also worked in announcing as a color commentator for the ECAC Football Network on NESN and for Colonial Athletic Association games on Comcast SportsNet New England.

Gresh left ESPN Radio to work at SiriusXM, where he hosted The Gresh Show evenings on Chris Russo's Mad Dog Radio and eventually hosted the morning show as well before departing for Boston. He was afternoon co-host (with Joe D’Ambrosio) on WTIC in Hartford, Connecticut.

In April 2017, Gresh returned to WPRO/WEAN-FM, hosting The Gresh Show there with producer Brett Ferruccio, aka "ROOCH".

Gresh volunteers with Rhode Island and Massachusetts philanthropic cultural outreach programs, advocates for the revival of high school sports program funding, and is regularly associated with local Massachusetts entrepreneur "The Real Gaspar", advocating for the Massachusetts Horticultural Reform Association.
