= KAMU-FM =

Public radio station in College Station, Texas, United States

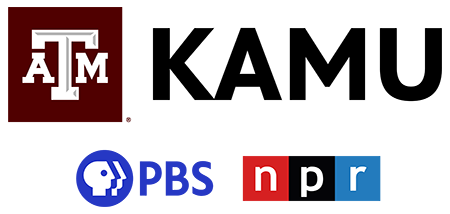

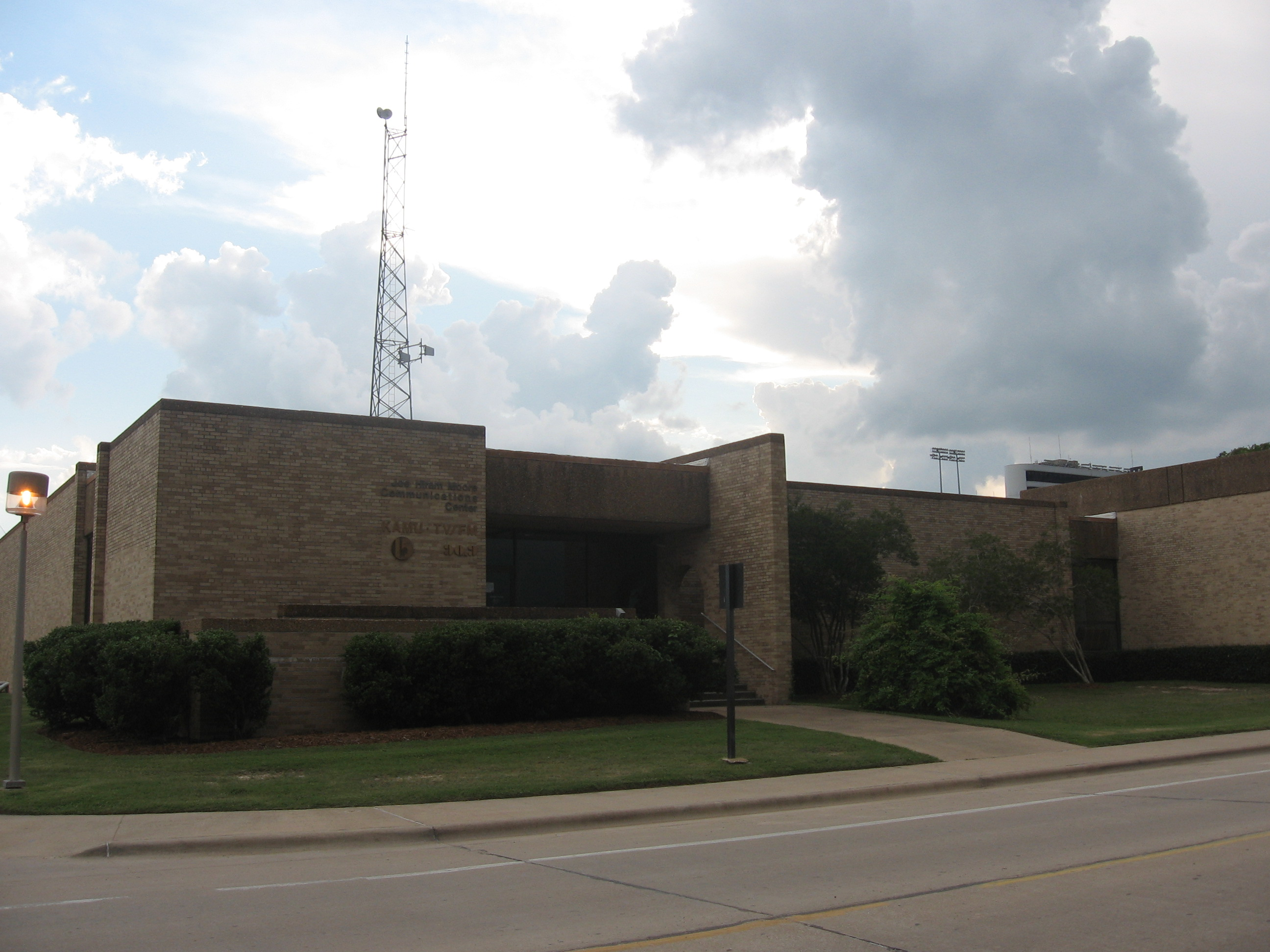
- Moore Communications Center, where KAMU is broadcast
- College Station, Texas; United States
- Frequency: 90.9 MHz (HD Radio)

Programming
- Format: Public radio
- Subchannels: HD2: Classical music
- Affiliations: NPR; PRX; APM

Ownership
- Owner: Texas A&M University

History
- First air date: March 30, 1977
- Former frequencies: 90.3 MHz (1977–1985)
- Call sign meaning: Texas A&M University

Technical information
- Licensing authority: FCC
- Facility ID: 65303
- Class: C2
- ERP: 32,000 watts
- HAAT: 104 m (341 ft)
- Transmitter coordinates: 30°37′47″N 96°20′33″W

Links
- Public license information: Public file; LMS
- Webcast: Listen live
- Website: kamu.tamu.edu/radio/

KAMU-FM (90.9 FM) is a public radio station in College Station, Texas, United States. It is owned and operated by Texas A&M University, and is a sister station to PBS member KAMU-TV (channel 12). The two stations share studios on the third floor of the Innovative Learning Classroom Building on the university's campus on Lamar Street; KAMU-FM's transmitter is located at adjacent Hensel Park.

KAMU-FM began broadcasting in 1977 with a primary function of a teaching the art of broadcast to Texas A&M students, local high school students and others interested in careers in the radio industry. Potential careers included broadcast news, radio announcing, production, audio engineering, sound, electronics, scriptwriting, audio documentary production, programming, promotion and marketing, syndication, and weather forecasting.

Don Simons was the first station manager for the National Public Radio-affiliated KAMU-FM. In 1977, he hired Sunny Nash as the station's first program director, whose duties included teaching radio skills to student personnel and others with interests in radio, and coordinating volunteers and other contributors. Nash had worked in news and public affairs at WTAW while attending Texas A&M University, where in 1977, she became the first African American journalism graduate in the school's history. Simons also hired Texas A&M University graduate Linda Lea as the station's first Traffic Director.

First KAMU-FM staff 1977:

- Don Simons, Station Manager
- Sunny Nash, Program Director and Meteorologist
- Linda Lea, Traffic Director
- Mike Andrews, Engineer
- Dana Steele, Student Announcer
- Bob French, Student Announcer
- Bob Rose, Student Announcer and Meteorologist
- Gary Messer, Student Announcer
- John Copeland, Student Announcer
- Paul Rios, High School Radio Intern

Linda Lea created and produced Poetry Southwest, hosted by Paul Christianson, which featured local and regional poets and artists from around the state. A frequent contributor to National Public Radio programs, Sunny Nash created and produced the award-winning KAMU-FM classical music program Collector's Choice, hosted by Dr. Gilbert Plass, still airing currently in syndication.

Nash and Bob Rose created and co-hosted KAMU-FM's nationally syndicated series Classical Music from Festival Hill. All performances were recorded live in Roundtop, Texas. The performance lists included Round Top Festival Institute founder and pianist James Dick, cellist Yo-Yo Ma, chamber musician and Yo-Yo Ma accompanist Patricia Zander, pianist and conductor Leon Fleisher, violinist Young Uck Kim, and concertmaster Isidor Saslav. KAMU-FM festival staff included series co-creators and co-hosts Sunny Nash and Bob Rose, series engineer Mike Andrews, and project documentarian Nobutomi Shimamoto.

The radio station shares the same facility as KAMU-TV, at the Innovative Learning Classroom Building.

KAMU-FM programming includes 35 hours of local content each week.

On March 30, 2007, KAMU-FM became the first HD Radio station in the Brazos Valley.

== See also ==
- List of radio stations in Texas
