= Rocky Allen =

American talk radio personality (1955–2026)

Rocky Allen

Donald Allen Jr. (April 15, 1955 – June 3, 2026), known professionally as Rocky Allen, was an American talk radio personality and host of the eponymous Rocky Allen Showgram. It aired, most recently, from 3 to 7 pm ET on FM station WPLJ, New York. Allen's show, which he co-hosted with long-time on-air partner Blain Ensley, was a mix of celebrity interviews, Top 40 music, and variety talk.

Allen previously hosted shows in Cape Girardeau (KGMO), Providence (WPRO-FM, 1991–1993), Detroit, St. Louis, Buffalo (WKSE in the late 1980s), and Dayton.

== Life and career ==
=== New York Radio ===
Allen's well-traveled career is best known for his streaks on New York radio station WPLJ, where he hosted an afternoon-drive show from 1993 until 1998, and again beginning in September 2005 until February 2008.

During his first run on the station, Allen underwent a series of surgeries beginning in October 1996 to remove calcium deposits believed to be the cause of persistent back pain. Allen was partially paralyzed following the surgeries, and required the use of a wheelchair. In October 1997, after a year of not being able to walk, doctors advised Allen to undergo full-time rehab which they said might be the only way for him to be able to walk again. This prompted Allen to go on a five-month leave of absence from radio, after which he was able to walk freely.

In January 1999, Allen made an unsuccessful move to WPLJ sister station WABC. The move was designed to complement WABC's non-political morning talk lineup of Art Bell and Laura Schlessinger. The show never matched its afternoon ratings success, and was replaced 15 months later by Curtis and Kuby, who had vacated the morning show on the station to make room for Allen.

He proceeded to host the morning show on WDVD, Detroit in 2001. He was joined by Blain Ensley in 2002. Ensley had previously served as co-host on the Sports Guys.

Allen and Ensley returned to WPLJ on September 20, 2005, nearly seven years after leaving the station. The show placed 15th among listeners ages 12-and-over in the Spring 2006 Arbitron book.

In a cost-cutting measure by WPLJ's parent company Citadel Broadcasting, the Rocky Allen Showgram was cancelled on February 29, 2008. Race Taylor, who was bumped to midday by the return of Allen, returned to the afternoon drive with a music-only format.

Allen briefly resurfaced in 2008 doing weekend sports talk on WEPN.

=== Personal life and death ===
Allen was born in Georgia. He attended St. Louis Community College and University of Missouri – St. Louis. He and his wife Julie have two daughters.

Allen died of cancer on June 3, 2026, at the age of 71.
