= 1993 in radio =

The year 1993 in radio involved some significant events.

== Events ==
- January
  - The Quad Cities' KSTT call letters are retired as 1170 AM is given the new call sign KJOC, reflecting that station's all-sports format. The station has been simulcasting WXLP's FM signal for the past four years, although its sports programming has been steadily increasing during this time.
  - WPAT and WPAT-FM Paterson, NJ/New York City quietly complete their evolution from Beautiful Music to down-tempo Adult Contemporary, still known as Easy 93.
- 4 January – WOWF/Detroit officially complete their flip from Top 40/CHR to talk as "Wow FM."
- 6 January – After 5 days of stunting with all-Garth Brooks music, rhythmic CHR-formatted WMXP/Pittsburgh flips to country as "K-Bear", WKQB.
- 10 January – Denver gets its second local country outlet when KDHT completes its move-in to the market and flips to "Big Dog 92.5."
- 15 January – KONC/Phoenix flips from classical to modern rock. A few weeks later, on 1 February, cross-town rival KFMA flips to beautiful music.
- 25 January – After stunting with all-Elvis music for 3 days, Top 40/CHR-formatted KFXD-FM/Boise flips to adult contemporary.
- 26 January – Toronto got its first country-formatted FM station when CISS-FM signs on the air.
- February – KZKZ/Ft. Smith flips from album rock to gospel, while KTEZ/Lubbock flips from beautiful music to country.
- 2 February – Pittsburgh picks up its third country outlet, as WORD-FM's former 104.7 frequency flips from religious programming and became "Rebel 104.7", WXRB.
- 5 February
  - WODZ/Memphis flips from oldies to country as "Froggy 94", WOGY.
  - Top 40/CHR-formatted KXXR/Kansas City changes call letters and rebrands as KISF, "Kiss 107.3."
- 7 February – KLZR/Lawrence, Kansas flips from satellite-fed Hot AC to modern rock
- 15 February – WXQL/Jacksonville flips to Urban AC
- 19 February – KBEQ/Kansas City drops its top-40 format of 20 years as "Q-104" to go country as "Young Country 104." It will initially be simulcast on KBZR 1030, which has been airing Z-Rock. The "Q-104" handle will return a few years later, but the format will remain country.
- 23 February – KZGZ (9.75 FM) in Agana, Guam signs on the air for the first time. The first format is rhythmic top 40 music as "Power 98".
- March
  - After 40-plus years in its hometown, KFMH (99.7 FM) moves its studios from Muscatine, Iowa to Davenport.
  - Cleveland-based Malrite Communications announces it will merge with Shamrock Broadcasting. The merger will be completed in August.
- 8 March – KKNB/Lincoln signs on with a modern rock format.
- 10 March -
- 12 March – After 10 years in the Top 40/CHR format (with a few moniker and format modifications), WEGX/Philadelphia becomes smooth jazz-formatted WJJZ. Three days later, struggling AC WKSZ fills the format void by flipping to "Z100." However, due to the presence of nearby WHTZ in New York (which is also located on 100.3 FM), the "Z100" moniker will be modified to "Y100".
- 2 April
  - After 20 years as an influential Top 40 station, WRBQ-FM/Tampa flips to country, while keeping its heritage "Q105" moniker.
  - KQLZ/Los Angeles (the former "Pirate Radio") flips from modern rock to Soft AC as "EZ 100.3" after Westwood One has sold the station to Viacom.
  - KCMQ/Columbia flips from Top 40/CHR to country.
- 5 April
  - In Akron, Ohio, Hot AC-formatted WQMX flips to country
  - Two stations in Syracuse flip to country within two days of each other: Beautiful Music-formatted WRHP flips today, while classic rock-formatted WKFM flips the next day.
- 19 April – WAQZ/Cincinnati flips from album rock to modern rock.
- 30 April – Virgin Radio, originally called Virgin 1215, is launched nationally in the United Kingdom on 1215 kHz at 12.15pm by Richard Branson. It subsequently becomes the most listened-to online radio station in the world.
- 11 May – CHR-formatted WZOU/Boston shifts to rhythmic CHR as "Jam'n 94.5", WJMN.
- 28 May – At 4 PM, WOWF/Detroit drop their 5-month-old talk format and flip to country, becoming one of the first "Young Country" stations.
- 3 June – Atlantic Ventures, Stoner Broadcasting and Multi Market Communications all merge to form American Radio Systems, consisting of 16 stations in 7 markets.
- 9 September – Cox and CBS make a swap involving the Dallas and Tampa radio markets. Cox receives AOR WYNF 94.9 "95 YNF" in Tampa from CBS to pair with its WWRM "Warm 107.3", while CBS receives KLRX "Lite 97.9" in Dallas from Cox to pair with its KTXQ "Q-102." KLRX flips to classic rock as KRRW "Arrow 97.9" on 15 October (becoming the second station to use that branding), while Cox moves the "Warm" format from 107.3 to 94.9 and launches 1970s hits WCOF "107.3 The Coast."
- 10 September – CBS installs the very first 70s-based classic hits-formatted "Arrow" station on KCBS-FM/Los Angeles, who drop their 4-year old oldies format.
- 22 September – WLUP-AM/Chicago moves their comedy/talk programming over to their FM sister station, and flips to sports talk as WMVP.
- October
  - Memphis gets its sixth urban-formatted station when WOGY-AM drops the simulcast with its FM sister station and flips to urban oldies as "The Juice", WJCE.
  - Carl Hirsch launches his new radio group venture, OmniAmerica Communications.
- 11 October
  - Westwood One announces it will acquire Unistar Radio Networks for $101.3 million; in addition, Westwood One will sell a 25% equity stake to Infinity Broadcasting for $15 million.
  - KPOI/Honolulu flips from album rock to modern rock.
- 25 October – Smooth jazz-formatted KHIH/Denver flips to religious programming; the format void will be filled by AC-formatted KHOW-FM a few days later.
- November
  - WWKS/Pittsburgh flips from classic rock to hard rock.
  - Booth American Company and Broadcast Alchemy announce plans of a merger, with the newly combined company getting 11 stations in 7 markets and $160 million. In addition, Metroplex Communications will merge with Clear Channel, a deal worth $53 million.
- 10 November – KQBR/Sacramento drops country for smooth jazz
- 12 November – After 23 years in the country format, KLAC/Los Angeles flips to Unistar's adult standards "AM Only" format.
- 15 November – Top 40/CHR-formatted WYAV/Myrtle Beach flips to classic rock, and became an affiliate of The Howard Stern Show.
- 19 November – The "Arrow" format is expanded to two adult contemporary-formatted stations in two markets; in Washington, D.C., WLTT adopts the format, while in Houston, KLTR flips to the format four days later.
- 16 December – 96WEFM begins broadcasting in Trinidad and Tobago.
- 31 December – RIAS Berlin closes down following German reunification.

== Debuts ==
- Art Bell begins national syndication of his late night talk show.

=== November ===
- 1: Flagler College's WFCF/88.5 begins broadcasting with a 12-hour-per-day schedule and a power level of 6 kilowatts (later to be upped to 10 kW)

== Endings/Closings ==
- Bill Ballance retires from radio after more than 50 years in the industry.
- DZCA 1170 finally ends due to lack of funding.

=== April ===
- 28: Salty Brine, longtime morning host at WPRO does his last program on that station.

=== September ===
- 3 – Final broadcast of Unistar's "Solid Gold Country," a five-day-a-week country gold program, after 10 years, the last 8-1/2 of which were as a daily one-hour program. The final show's topic spotlights songs from award-winning albums.
- Final broadcast of Bit, byte, gebissen, a German program on computer topics, produced by the Bayerischer Rundfunk (Bavarian Broadcasting).

== Births ==
- 28 January: Roman Kemp, English radio music presenter.
- 23 September: Lloyd Cadena, Filipino vlogger and radio personality on 90.7 Love Radio (d. 2020).
- 14 October: Charlie Kirk, American conservative radio personality on Salem Radio Network (d. 2025).

== Deaths ==
- 25 November: Harry Elders, 84, American radio actor and announcer.
- 28 November: Garry Moore, 78, American entertainer, game show host and comedian.
- 28 December: William L. Shirer, 89, American war correspondent.

== See also ==
- Radio broadcasting
