= Gilbert Plass =

Canadian physicist (1920–2004)

Gilbert Norman Plass
- Born: March 22, 1920; Toronto, Ontario, Canada
- Died: March 1, 2004 (aged 83); Bryan, Texas, U.S.
- Education: Harvard University, Princeton University
- Known for: Research into the warming properties of carbon dioxide
- Spouse: Thyra
- Children: Gordon Marc Plass and Lucie Susan Plass Kerwood
- Scientific career
- Fields: Physics
- Thesis: Black body radiation in the theory of action at a distance. (1946)
- Doctoral advisor: John Archibald Wheeler

Gilbert Norman Plass (March 22, 1920 – March 1, 2004) was a Canadian physicist who in the 1950s made predictions about the increase in global atmospheric carbon dioxide (CO_{2}) levels in the 20th century and its effect on the average temperature of the planet that closely match measurements reported half a century later.

== Biography ==
Plass worked most of his life as a physicist in the United States. He graduated from Harvard University in 1941 and earned a PhD in physics from Princeton University in 1947. He worked as an associate physicist at the Metallurgical Laboratory (Manhattan District) of the University of Chicago from 1942 to 1945. He became an instructor of physics at Johns Hopkins University in 1946, and eventually became an associate professor there. In 1955, leaving academia, he held a job for a year as a staff scientist with Lockheed Aircraft Corporation. He then joined the advanced research staff at the Aeronutronic division of the Ford Motor Company. In 1960, he became manager of the research lab at Ford's theoretical physics department and a consulting editor of the journal Infrared Physics (now called Infrared Physics and Technology). In 1963, he accepted a position as the first professor of atmospheric and space science at the Southwest Center for Advanced Studies (now The University of Texas at Dallas), where he remained for five years. In 1968, he arrived at Texas A&M University, where he served as professor of physics and head of the department.

=== Carbon dioxide research ===
In 1953 Plass told Time magazine of his work on the effects of CO_{2} from industrial sources as a greenhouse gas, and the potential implications of an increased concentration of carbon dioxide in the atmosphere for global warming. He said, "At its present rate of increase, the CO_{2} in the atmosphere will raise the earth's average temperature 1.5° Fahrenheit every 100 years. ... for centuries to come, if man's industrial growth continues, the earth's climate will continue to grow warmer." The award-winning short film Invisible Blanket (2018) was based on Plass' article in Time.

From 1956 onwards, Plass published a series of papers on the topic, partly based on advanced calculations of the absorption of infrared radiation, and he made use of early electronic computers. He predicted that a doubling of CO_{2} would warm the planet by 3.6 °C, that CO_{2} levels in 2000 would be 30% higher than in 1900 and that the planet would be about 1 °C warmer in 2000 than in 1900. In 2007 the IPCC Fourth Assessment Report estimated a climate sensitivity of 2 to 4.5 °C for CO_{2} doubling, a CO_{2} rise of 37% since pre-industrial times and a 1900-2000 warm-up of around 0.7 °C.

Nathaniel Rich recognizes Plass in his 2019 bestseller Losing Earth.

=== Other work ===
Plass was an avid philatelist, and founded the United States Possessions Philatelic Society in 1978. He then served as the editor of their journal, Possessions, for 14 years.

He also hosted a classical-music oriented radio program called Collector's Choice on KAMU-FM for many years.

== Bibliography ==
- Plass, Gilbert N. (1956). "Infrared Radiation in the Atmosphere". American Journal of Physics. 24 (5). American Association of Physics Teachers (AAPT): 303–321. Bibcode:1956AmJPh..24..303P. doi:10.1119/1.1934220. ISSN 0002-9505.
- Plass, G.N., 1956, Carbon Dioxide and the Climate, American Scientist 44, p. 302–16. JSTOR 27826805
- Plass, Gilbert N. (1956). "Effect of Carbon Dioxide Variations on Climate". American Journal of Physics. 24 (5). American Association of Physics Teachers (AAPT): 376–387. Bibcode:1956AmJPh..24..376P. doi:10.1119/1.1934233. ISSN 0002-9505.
- Plass, G.N., 1956, The Carbon Dioxide Theory of Climatic Change, Tellus VIII, 2. (1956), p. 140–154.
- Plass, G.N., 1959, Carbon Dioxide and Climate, Scientific American, July, p. 41–47. JSTOR 24940327

== See also ==
- Greenhouse effect
