= KGTF =

Television station in Hagåtña, Guam

- Hagåtña; Guam
- Channels: Digital: 12 (VHF); Virtual: 12
- Branding: PBS Guam

Programming
- Affiliations: 12.1: PBS

Ownership
- Owner: Guam Educational Telecommunications Corporation

History
- First air date: October 30, 1970
- Former channel numbers: Analog: 12 (VHF, 1970-2009); Digital: 5 (VHF, 2000–2009)
- Call sign meaning: Guam Telecommunications Facility

Technical information
- Licensing authority: FCC
- Facility ID: 25511
- ERP: 54.7 kW
- HAAT: 177.8 m (583 ft)
- Transmitter coordinates: 13°29′22″N 144°49′46″E

Links
- Public license information: Public file; LMS
- Website: pbsguam.org

KGTF (channel 12) is a PBS member television station licensed to Hagåtña, Guam, serving the U.S. territory. The station is owned by the Guam Educational Telecommunications Corporation, an agency of the territorial government. KGTF's studios are located on the campus of the University of Guam on 194 Sesame Street adjacent to Guam Community College in Mangilao, and its transmitter is located on Mount Barrigada in Barrigada. KGTF currently operates from 6 a.m. to midnight seven days a week.

== History ==
The National Educational Association set up an educational television project in Guam in August 1967, in line with similar plans in other US overseas territories, under the perception that television would bring the "modernization of education". Such consultancy would culminate in the creation of KGTF, with the launch set for 1970.

The station signed on the air on October 30, 1970, with only 4 1/2 hours of programming Monday through Friday, of which they would later expand throughout its 50-year history, including producing local shows and various projects. Original materials from PBS Guam have been contributed to the American Archive of Public Broadcasting. The channel was made possible by a $150,000 grant by the Department of Health, Education and Welfare.

The station was in financial trouble in 1975, facing problems in raising the percentage of its government funding required by law. That year, it became a PBS branch station by the authorization of the 12th Guam Legislature Bill, creating the Guam Educational Telecommunications Corporation. At the same time, Harry Engel, founder of the KUAM radio and TV stations, started working at KGTF, before moving abroad.

Last KGTF channel 12 logo, before adopting PBS Guam branding.

As of 1993, KGTF produced 30 percent of the output it aired. Such content at the time included a Filipino current affairs program, a competition program for high school students, meetings of the Guam Legislature, public service announcements and conventional educational programs. Nearly all of the 22 staff employed by the station were Guamanians. The station used a 6-kilowatt transmitter to deliver its terrestrial signal as well as being relayed on cable television, whereas two repeaters had been purchased at the time to boost its coverage towards the Commonwealth of the Northern Marianas Islands to the north.

KGTF shut down its analog signal, over VHF channel 12, on January 23, 2009, approximately five months before the official date on which full-power television stations in the United States transitioned from analog to digital broadcasts under federal mandate. The station's digital signal remained on its pre-transition VHF channel 5, using virtual channel 12.

KGTF is a partner of the Pacific Community's television newsmagazine The Pacific Way.

PBS Guam received PBS' overhaul branding in late-November 2019.

== Subchannel ==
Subchannel of KGTF
Channel	Res.	Short name	Programming
12.1	1080i	KGTF HD	PBS

== See also ==
- Channel 12 digital TV stations in the United States
- Channel 12 virtual TV stations in the United States
