= Dutee Wilcox Flint =

American politician

Dutee Wilcox Flint (December 19, 1882 – March 31, 1961) was a Rhode Island state senator and business magnate in the Rhode Island and Connecticut area.

== Business career ==
Flint was primarily invested in the automobile industry, but also owned a number of radio stations, including current WPRO, and the Dutee W. Flint Oil Company. By the beginning of the 1930s, however, he was not the owner of many of these assets; the Dutee W. Flint Oil Company was sold to Socony in 1929, and radio station WDWF (future WPRO) was sold to Cherry & Webb Broadcasting in 1931. Most importantly, and after the discontinuance of the Model T in 1927, was forced to sell his stock and Ford dealerships, along with most other assets he had in the Ford Motor Company.
