= WPRV =

- Providence, Rhode Island; United States
- Broadcast area: Providence metropolitan area
- Frequency: 790 kHz
- Branding: 790 The Score

Programming
- Format: Sports betting
- Affiliations: Westwood One; Westwood One Sports; Boston Celtics Radio Network; New York Yankees Radio Network

Ownership
- Owner: Cumulus Media; (Radio License Holding CBC, LLC)
- Sister stations: WEAN-FM; WPRO; WPRO-FM; WWKX; WWLI

History
- First air date: June 2, 1922
- Former call signs: WEAN (1922–1986); WWAZ (1986–1989); WLKW (1989–1997); WSKO (1997–2008)
- Call sign meaning: Providence

Technical information
- Licensing authority: FCC
- Facility ID: 64840
- Class: B
- Power: 5,000 watts
- Transmitter coordinates: 41°50′3.36″N 71°21′54.2″W

Links
- Public license information: Public file; LMS
- Webcast: Listen live
- Website: www.thescore790.com

WPRV (790 AM, "The Score") is a commercial radio station in Providence, Rhode Island. The station is owned by Cumulus Media, and airs a sports radio format, largely focused on sports betting. Its studios are on Wampanoag Trail in East Providence. Established in 1922 as WEAN, the station is the oldest surviving radio station in Rhode Island.

WPRV's power is 5,000 watts. The station operates non-directional by day; at night, to protect other stations on 790 AM from interference, it uses a directional antenna with a two-tower array. WPRV's transmitter is off King Phillip Road in East Providence, near the Seekonk River.

== Programming ==
Most of WPRV's programming is syndicated from Westwood One Sports. It also features a local afternoon program hosted by Kevin McNamara.

The station serves as the Providence affiliate for the New York Yankees Radio Network and the Boston Celtics Radio Network. It also carries Brown University football and men's basketball.

== History ==
=== Early years ===
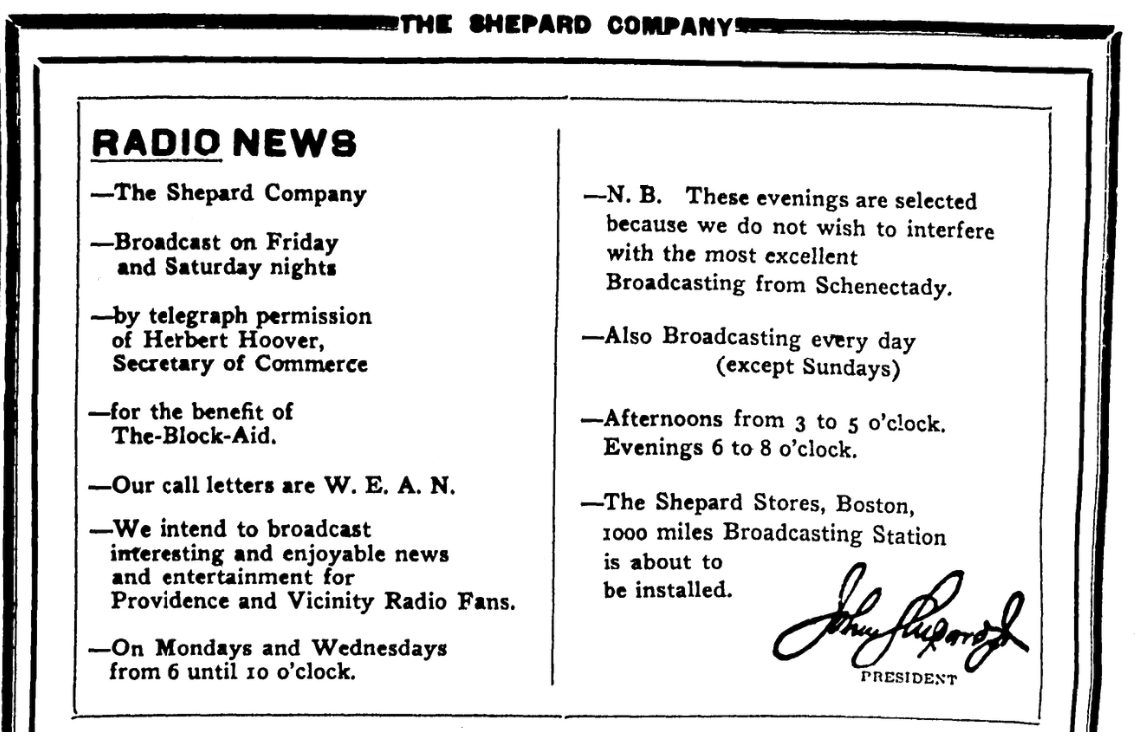
WEAN, owned by The Shepard Stores, began broadcasting on June 2, 1922, in conjunction with the two-day "Block-Aid" fund-raising street festival.

On December 1, 1921, the U.S. Department of Commerce, in charge of radio at the time, adopted a regulation formally establishing a broadcasting station category, which set aside the wavelength of 360 meters (833 kHz) for entertainment broadcasts, and 485 meters (619 kHz) for farm market and weather reports. The Shepard Company Department Store in Providence was selling radio receivers and sought to have a station for its customers to listen to.

On June 2, 1922, the Shepard Company application was granted. The new station was issued the call sign WEAN, and a telegram was sent authorizing immediate operation. However, the station's license was not issued until June 5. The call letters were randomly assigned from a sequential roster of available call signs, and the station initially transmitted on the shared 360-meter "entertainment" wavelength. On June 2 and 3, Providence held a "Block-Aid" fund-raising street festival, benefiting the Rhode Island Hospital. The "radio editor" of the Providence News arranged for the new station to broadcast musical selections in support of this event.

WEAN was the second licensed Rhode Island broadcasting station, and is the oldest surviving one. Throughout the 1920s, the U.S. government struggled to maintain an equitable assignment policy. During this period WEAN was reassigned to multiple transmitting frequencies, until on November 11, 1928, as a result of a major national reallocation implemented under the Federal Radio Commission's General Order 40, it moved to 550 kHz. However, this was changed the next year to 780 kHz.

A 1924 fire at the Shepard store destroyed the transmitter, and in 1928 the station moved to the Biltmore Hotel. WEAN's studios were later in the Crown Hotel in Providence.

=== Yankee Network ===
Starting in 1927, WEAN received programming from Boston sister station WNAC, the forerunner to WBIX (1260 AM) and WRKO (680 AM). This formed the cornerstone of the Yankee Network, a regional radio service feeding newscasts and other programs throughout the region. In the 1940s and 1950s, WEAN was a network affiliate of the Mutual Broadcasting System, carrying its dramas, comedies, variety shows, news and sports.

On March 29, 1941, under the provisions of the North American Regional Broadcasting Agreement (NARBA), stations on 780 kHz, including WEAN, moved to 790 kHz, which has been the station's assignment ever since. The Shepard family announced the sale of the Yankee Network, including WEAN, to General Tire & Rubber in December 1942. The transaction was approved the following month. In August 1954, General Teleradio announced it would sell WEAN to the Providence Journal-Bulletin newspaper, which already owned WPJB (1420 AM) and WPJB-FM 105.1; upon assuming control on October 9, the Journal-Bulletin shut down WPJB (AM), with WEAN inheriting its ABC affiliation (while retaining the Mutual and Yankee Network affiliations) and WPJB-FM continuing in operation as WEAN's "fine music" sister station. By the 1960s, WEAN was a full service, middle-of-the-road outlet, with popular music, news and sports. It transitioned to adult contemporary music by the 1970s.

=== All-news ===
From 1975 to 1977, WEAN was an affiliate of NBC's short-lived "News And Information Service", or "NIS", a 24-hour all-news radio network and branded "All News 79 WEAN". When NIS folded in 1977, WEAN continued as an all-news station with its own staff of anchors and reporters. Affiliation switched to CBS, and while the station carried a considerable amount of CBS news content, most news originated locally, with a local staff that numbered as high as 22 members (not all full-time, but all working for the news department.)

WEAN continued as an all-news station ("Newsradio 79 WEAN"), morphing in the early 1980s into all-news much of the day, but with local talk in certain dayparts and syndicated late-night talk. It continued as such, branded "Newstalk 79 WEAN" until shortly after the Journal-Bulletin sold it on April 1, 1985.

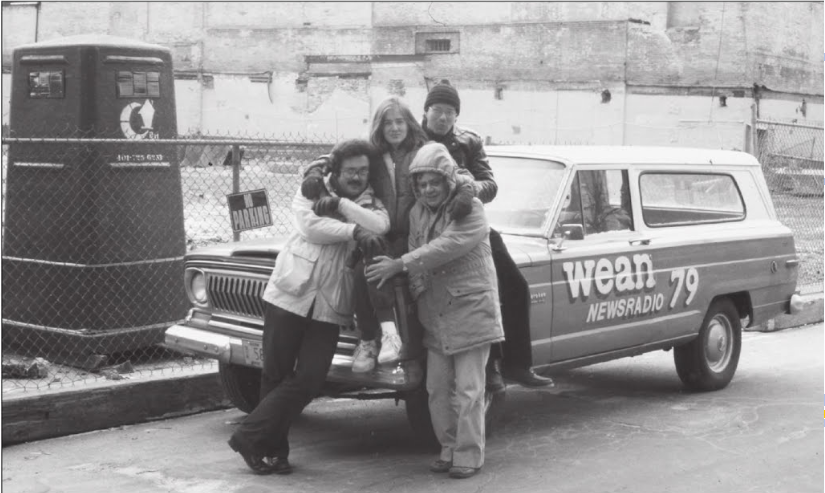
WEANers and Wagon

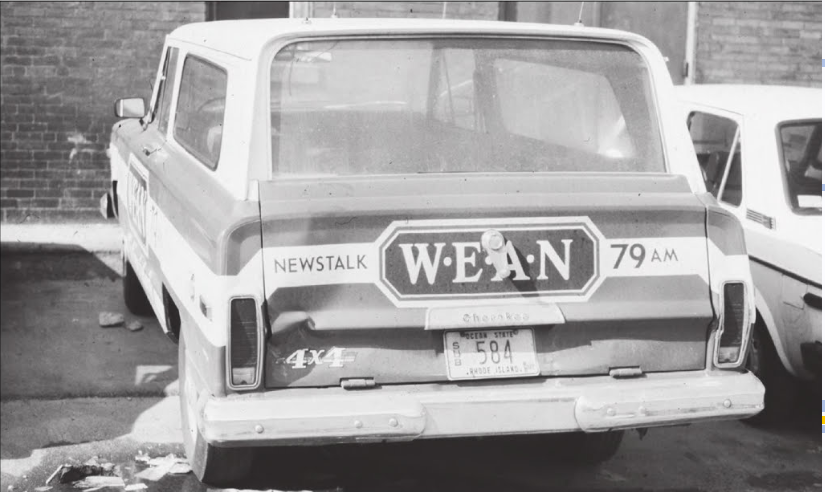
WEANie Wagon

=== Oldies, sports, standards ===
After ownership changes, WEAN changed call signs to WWAZ, with classical music, followed by oldies, then adult standards under the call sign WLKW. (Beginning in 2008 the historic WEAN call letters were assigned to co-owned WEAN-FM 99.7). WLKW switched formats and call signs on November 17, 1997, to sports radio as WSKO ("The Score"), airing local and national sports shows (including ESPN Radio programs). Starting in 2002, most programs were simulcast with WSKO-FM 99.7 (which was replaced by WEAN-FM, a simulcast of WPRO). The sports format was discontinued on March 10, 2008. Hosts over the years included John "Coach" Colletto, Andy Gresh, Scott Cordischi, John Rooke, Steve Hyder, Jess Atkinson, Amy Lawrence, Scott Zolak, John Crowe, and Bryan Morry.

After dropping sports, the station took on the call sign WPRV, as well as an oldies format, largely provided by Scott Shannon's The True Oldies Channel from ABC Radio.

=== Business news ===
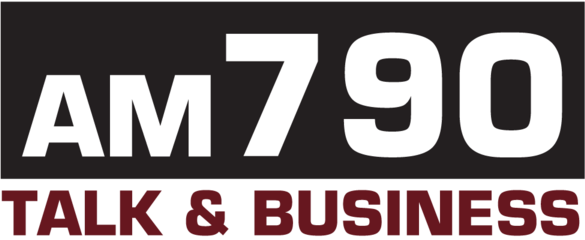
Logo as a talk and business station from April 12, 2009, to August 8, 2022

The oldies format was discontinued on April 13, 2009. WPRV moved to a business news and talk format, including shows from Bloomberg Radio; much of the business programming would eventually be scaled back and replaced with national talk shows.

Because sister stations WPRO and WEAN-FM mostly air local talk hosts, WPRV served as the Providence outlet for many of co-owned Westwood One's syndicated conservative talk shows. WPRV was the Providence affiliate for First Light, America in the Morning, The Chris Plante Show, The Dave Ramsey Show, The Mark Levin Show, The Dan Bongino Show, The Ben Shapiro Show, The Michael Knowles Show and Red Eye Radio. Weekends featured shows on money and health, including Ric Edelman, as well as repeats of weekday programs.

=== Return to sports ===
On June 15, 2022, Cumulus announced that WPRV would change its format back to sports, again using the "790 The Score" branding; the relaunch occurred at midnight on August 8. The revived "Score" primarily featured programming from the CBS Sports Radio and BetQL networks, along with a local afternoon program hosted by Kevin McNamara (with its second hour serving as a simulcast with his existing program on WPRO and WEAN-FM) and WPRV's existing New York Yankees, Boston Celtics, and Brown University broadcasts.

== See also ==
- List of initial AM-band station grants in the United States
