= WWLI =

Coordinates: 41.807°N 71.470°W

Providence, Rhode Island; United States
- Broadcast area: Providence metropolitan area
- Frequency: 105.1 MHz (HD Radio)
- Branding: Lite 105

Programming
- Format: Adult contemporary
- Affiliations: Compass Media Networks

Ownership
- Owner: Cumulus Media; (Radio License Holding CBC, LLC)
- Sister stations: WEAN-FM; WPRO; WPRO-FM; WPRV; WWKX

History
- First air date: July 11, 1948 (as WPJB)
- Former call signs: WPJB (1948–1951); WPJB-FM (1951–1985)
- Call sign meaning: "Lite"

Technical information
- Licensing authority: FCC
- Facility ID: 64838
- Class: B
- ERP: 50,000 watts
- HAAT: 152 meters (499 ft)

Links
- Public license information: Public file; LMS
- Webcast: Listen live
- Website: www.lite105.com

WWLI (105.1 FM), branded Lite 105, is an American commercial radio station licensed to Providence, Rhode Island. The station is owned by Cumulus Media and broadcasts an adult contemporary radio format, switching to Christmas music for much of November and December, including the days between Christmas Day and New Years Eve. The radio studios are on Wampanoag Trail in East Providence.

WWLI has an effective radiated power (ERP) of 50,000 watts, the maximum for FM stations in Rhode Island. The transmitter is off Heath Street in Johnston.

== History ==
=== WPJB ===
The Providence Journal Bulletin daily newspaper applied for a construction permit for a new FM station in 1944. The station was originally to operate in the old FM band on 46.9 MHz. The construction permit was issued by the Federal Communications Commission (FCC) in 1947 with a frequency of 105.1 MHz in the new FM band. The station began broadcasting July 11, 1948, as WPJB, with the call sign being derived from the newspaper's initials. WPJB mostly played classical music in its early decades.

WPJB was one of the few FM stations in this era to not be co-owned with an AM station. But in 1951 the Journal purchased WFCI (1420 AM) and changed its call sign to WPJB. This resulted in the FM station adding the -FM suffix, changing to WPJB-FM. The Journal silenced WPJB AM on October 9, 1954, after purchasing WEAN (790 AM, now WPRV) from General Teleradio. As WEAN did not operate an FM station, WPJB-FM remained on the air with its classical format. Both stations retained their existing call letters. Over time, WPJB reduced the classical programming and added beautiful music. Eventually, it was a full time easy listening station, playing quarter hour sweeps of mostly soft instrumental songs.

=== JB 105 ===
WPJB-FM became a top 40 station, "JB 105", on August 1, 1975, a change promoted in The Providence Journal the week before. The station's classical music library was donated to the Providence College radio station, WDOM, a year later. "JB 105" initially used an early version of a format developed by Mike Joseph that eventually became known as Hot Hits (branded as "Big Hits" on WPJB), to compete with established Top 40 outlets WPRO and WPRO-FM. The "Big Hits" format limited its playlist to only the biggest selling songs repeated frequently, with the use of numerous jingles.

Eventually, "JB 105" shifted to a more standard Top 40 style. WPJB saw some ratings success when rival WPRO-FM began taking a more adult-focused approach in 1980, which boosted JB 105's teen listenership. However, by the end of the year, WPRO-FM's ratings began to recover, and WPJB began making changes to its format. At the start of 1981, the station moved to more of a rock-based direction, but after WHJY adopted an album rock format in September, WPJB abruptly backed away from this emphasis. The following year, the station began shifting to an adult contemporary format. That November, WPJB stopped including a Top 35 chart in The Providence Journal, and in 1983 the "JB 105" branding was dropped. WPJB again shifted closer to top 40 in August 1984.

=== Lite 105 ===
The Providence Journal sold WPJB-FM and WEAN to Eastern Broadcasting Corporation in 1985. Eastern placed less emphasis on the callsign WPJB that April. On June 13, the station began to announce that "WPJB is dead!" After a period of stunting, on June 14, it adopted a soft adult contemporary format, as "Lite 105". with the call letters changing to WWLI. Eastern Broadcasting was bought by Tele-Media in 1989.

Four years later, Tele-Media bought former rivals WPRO and WPRO-FM. Tele-Media, in turn, sold its stations to Citadel Broadcasting in 1997. WWLI soon moved to a mainstream adult contemporary format. The branding changed to "Lite Rock 105" in 2001.

=== Mainstream AC ===
In 2007, the format was freshened to include more 1980s, 1990s and current songs, while dropping some songs from the 1970s. By the end of 2008, longtime afternoon host Charlie Jefferds left the station and live weekend hosts were eliminated in a cost-cutting measure. In November 2010, mid-day host Tanya Cruise left the station. Citadel merged with Cumulus Media on September 16, 2011. On November 4, 2011, NiteLite host Art Spencer was released after 18 years as the station's evening host, per budget cuts ordered by new owner, Cumulus. Since 2012, the format has become substantially more uptempo, with newer releases added to the playlist.

In December 2013, the new "Heather and Steve" morning show debuted (former host David Jones exited in November 2013), and in February 2014, "Intelligence for Your Life with John Tesh" was added as the syndicated evening program. The morning show became "Heather and Matty" in November 2021 after Steve (Stephen Donovan) had been let go during the summer.

In October 2014, Lite Rock's "2 Lite Chicks" (Heather Gersten and Amy Pontes) debuted the "Wicked Awesome 80's (sic) Show." It airs on Saturday nights.

In January 2021, WWLI reverted back to being "Lite 105", the branding that was previously used from 1985 to 2001. The station's branding changes to "The Christmas Station," when it switches to a Christmas music format in November and December.

== Personalities ==
Notable former personnel include inaugural Rhode Island Radio Hall of Fame member Charlie Jefferds, former program Director Brian Demay, former program director Tony Bristol, former morning show host David Jones, former Nite Lite host Art Spencer, former morning show host Gary Degraide and former assistant program director Mike Rovin (a.k.a. "JT").

Other personalities heard on the station include Heidi West, Peter Clark, Linda Liese, Tom Holt, Bonnie, Donna Mac, Sue Wilson, Rebecca Morse Whitten (a.k.a. Kim Wakefield), Scott Cook, Lori Sergiacomi (a.k.a. "Tanya Cruise"), Larry Kruger, Rick Cabral (a.k.a. "RJ"), Michael Bernz and Cruisin' Bruce Palmer.
