= WPJB =

Radio station in Providence, Rhode Island (1941–1954)

- Providence, Rhode Island; United States
- Broadcast area: Providence metropolitan area
- Frequency: 1420 kHz

Programming
- Affiliations: NBC Blue; Blue Network; ABC

Ownership
- Owner: Providence Journal Company
- Sister stations: WFCI-FM (101.5); WPJB-FM (105.1)

History
- First air date: April 28, 1941 (as WFCI in Pawtucket)
- Last air date: October 9, 1954
- Former call signs: WFCI (1941–1951)
- Call sign meaning: Providence Journal-Bulletin

Technical information
- Class: III
- Power: 5,000 watts

WPJB (1420 AM) was a radio station in Providence, Rhode Island, which began broadcasting in 1941. It was deleted in 1954 after its owner, the Providence Journal-Bulletin, purchased a second local station, WEAN, because contemporary Federal Communications Commission ownership rules had a limit of a single local station on the AM band.

== History ==
=== WFCI (1941–1951) ===
Matchbook from WFCI in blue, advertising its affiliation with the Blue network.

The station was first issued a construction permit in the fall of 1940, as WFCI, to the Pawtucket Broadcasting Company on 1390 kHz, with a transmitter site in Lincoln. However, as of March 1941, most stations on 1390 kHz, including the not-yet-operational WFCI, were moved to 1420 kHz, because of the implementation of the North American Regional Broadcasting Agreement.

The station call letters reflected the station's founder and president, Frank Cook. This was the second Pawtucket station to hold the WFCI call sign, as an earlier WFCI, founded by Cook in 1926, had also been WFCI until changing to WPAW two years later. With the reappearance of the historic WFCI call sign, the 1941 station was commonly referred to as "The New WFCI". The station began regularly scheduled programming on April 28. W. Paul Oury was general manager, and George Sutherland was program director.

WFCI was one of four radio stations in the pre-World War II Providence market (the others being WPRO, WEAN and WJAR). WFCI was an affiliate of the NBC Blue network, which in 1943 became simply the Blue Network, and finally changed to the American Broadcasting Company (ABC) in 1945. WFCI added FM service on 101.5 MHz in about 1950; on that frequency today is WWBB.

The station became a Colonial and Mutual affiliate as of April 5, 1941 (prior to that it had served as WEAN's overflow station). WFCI moved to the Biltmore Hotel in Providence in 1949 and took over WEAN's ABC affiliation.

WFCI was relicensed to Providence in 1950.

=== WPJB (1951–1954) ===
Frank F. Cook, owner of 70% of the station, died in an automobile accident on December 1, 1950. WFCI was sold to the Providence Journal-Bulletin in 1951; the newspaper changed the call sign to WPJB, matching their radio station on 105.1 MHz (now WWLI).

The Journal-Bulletin bought a second local station, WEAN in 1954. However, the August 1941 adoption of the Federal Communications Commission (FCC)'s "duopoly" rule restricted licensees from operating more than one radio station in a given market. Therefore, WPJB was taken off the air on October 9, 1954, the day the Journal-Bulletin began operating WEAN; the FCC canceled the license on October 20. The ABC affiliation returned to WEAN, and WPJB-FM continued operations under its existing call sign.

The vacated assignment for 1420 AM was soon reused, when WBSM in New Bedford, Massachusetts, was given permission to move to 1420 kHz in 1956, where it remains to this day.

== Programming ==
- Buddy & The Gang.
- Cavaliere Antonio Pace hosted an Italian program which had originated at WPRO & was also heard at one time on WRIB.

== Personnel ==
- T.F. Allen: Advertising & Commercial head (1941)
- Frank Cook: Founder.
- W. Paul Oury: general manager (1941)
- Arthur Paquette: Host of the "1420 Club" (1942)
- Anita Ramos: Supervisor of foreign broadcasts.
- Mark Sheeler: Disc jockey (1948)
- George Sutherland: program director (1941).
- Howard W. Thornley: chief engineer (1941).
- Wallace A. Walker: General Manager (1946)
