= Doug White (news anchor) =

American news anchor (1944–2006)

Douglas Cameron White (October 2, 1944 – August 15, 2006) was an American news anchor.

A native of Boston, Massachusetts, and an alumnus of Bates College, White's first work in television was at WGBH-TV while at Boston University on a work fellowship. White worked at WPRI-TV, located in Providence, Rhode Island, for six years. He then joined NBC's WJAR-TV (later WJAR), located in Cranston, Rhode Island, in 1978, anchoring the 6:00 and 11:00 pm newscasts during that time and adding the 5:00 pm edition in 2001.

Before that, he worked at WSMW-TV in Worcester, Massachusetts, and WLBZ-TV in Bangor, Maine.

He went on medical leave in 2005 due to cancer, which was the cause of his death at his home in Warwick, Rhode Island, on August 15, 2006, at the age of 61.

== External links and references ==
- The Boston Globe's coverage of White's death
- "NBC 10's Doug White passes away" - WJAR website
