= WWKX =

- Woonsocket, Rhode Island; United States
- Broadcast area: Blackstone Valley
- Frequency: 106.3 MHz
- Branding: 106.3 The Wolf

Programming
- Format: Classic rock

Ownership
- Owner: Cumulus Media; (Radio License Holding CBC, LLC)
- Sister stations: WEAN-FM; WPRO; WPRO-FM; WPRV; WWLI

History
- First air date: June 26, 1949
- Former call signs: WWON-FM (1949–1986); WNCK (1986–1988)
- Former frequencies: 105.5 MHz (1949–1958)
- Call sign meaning: "Kicks" (former branding)

Technical information
- Licensing authority: FCC
- Facility ID: 65198
- Class: A
- ERP: 1,150 watts
- HAAT: 158 meters (518 ft)
- Transmitter coordinates: 41°59′43.4″N 71°26′52.2″W

Links
- Public license information: Public file; LMS
- Webcast: Listen live
- Website: www.thewolf1063.com

WWKX (106.3 FM) is a classic rock radio station in Woonsocket, Rhode Island, serving the Blackstone Valley and much of the Providence metropolitan area. The Cumulus Media outlet operates with an ERP of 1.15 kW and is licensed to Woonsocket. The station's studios are located in East Providence and the transmitter site is in Cumberland. The station is a semi-satellite of WMOS, which covers southern Rhode Island and southeastern Connecticut.

== History ==
The current WWKX signed on June 26, 1949, as WWON-FM 105.5, the FM sister station to WWON (now WOON). In 1950, WWON-FM operated with 390 watts. WWON-FM changed frequencies to the current 106.3 by summer 1958. In the 1970s, the station played oldies, and in 1986 became WNCK. In 1988, it flipped to urban contemporary as WWKX "Kicks 106" (later "Kix 106"), before it shifted to rhythmic contemporary as "The Rhythm of Southern New England" in November 1990; the format scored high ratings in the 18-34 demographic from 1995 to 1997. By February 1998, the station adopted the "Hot 106" moniker and tweaked its playlist towards a pure R&B/Hip-Hop flavor.

WWKX was the only rhythmic top 40 in the United States to air Howard Stern from 1997 to January 5, 2005, when parent company Citadel Broadcasting ceased airing the show in a dispute regarding Stern's mentioning of his upcoming move to Sirius Satellite Radio. Citadel merged with Cumulus Media on September 16, 2011.

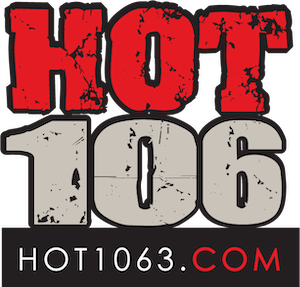
Former logo of "Hot 106" used from 2003 until October 2024

On October 30, 2024, WWKX's morning hosts, "Mike D" DaSilva and Alexus Lee, announced that they had exited the station. At midnight on October 31, WWKX dropped its longtime rhythmic contemporary format and began stunting with Halloween-themed music; with the move, the rest of the "Hot 106" airstaff would also depart the station. On November 1, the station shifted its stunting to songs by Grateful Dead, in recognition of the Day of the Dead. On November 2 at midnight, after playing "Dire Wolf", WWKX flipped to classic rock as "106.3 The Wolf".

The callsign WWKX was assigned to 104.5 in Gallatin/Nashville, Tennessee, from 1978 to 1987. This station is now WGFX, also a Cumulus station.
