= Festival Hill Concert Hall =

Concert hall in Round Top, Texas

Coordinates: 30.0780°N 96.6942°W

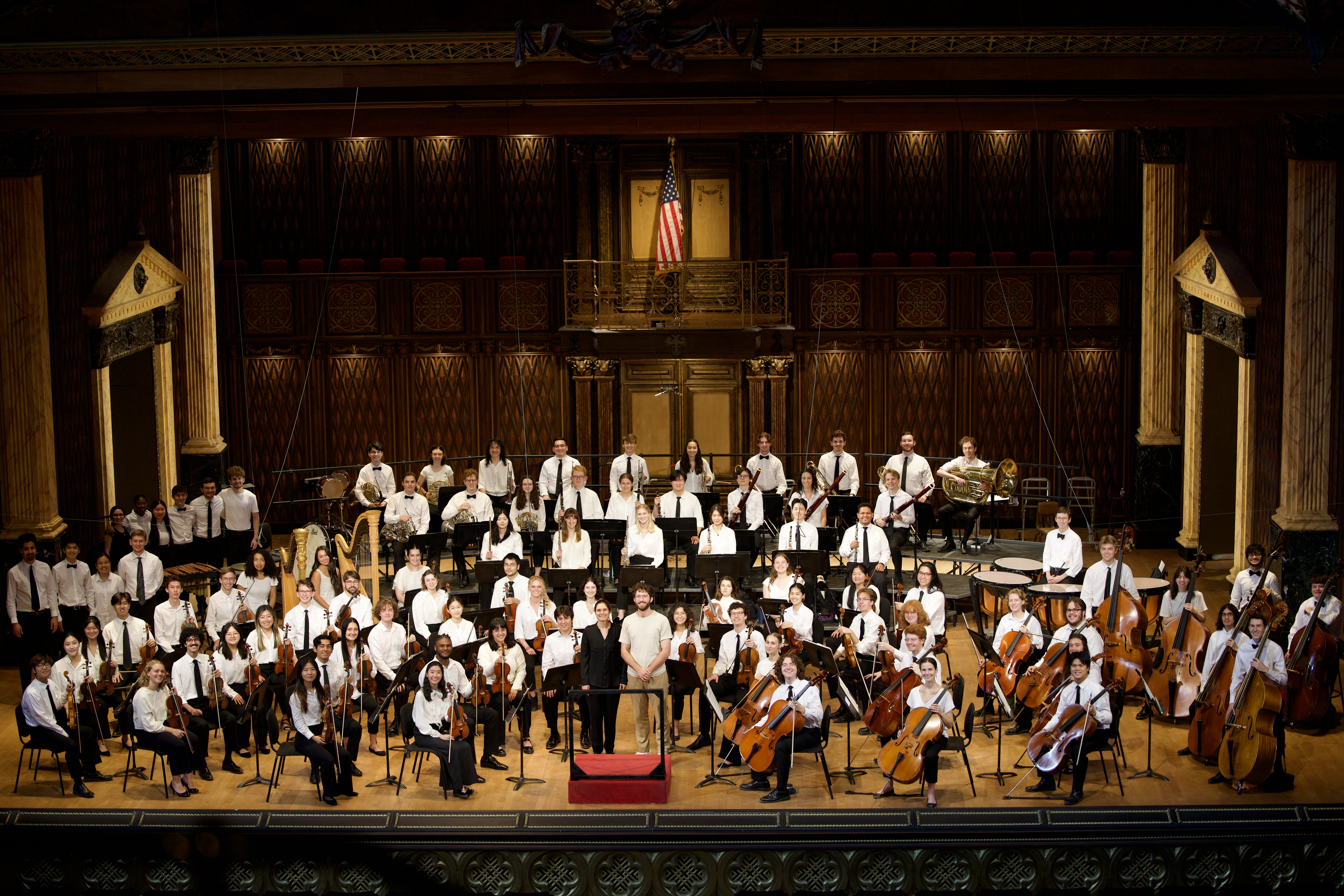

Festival Hill Concert Hall is a concert hall used by the Round Top Festival Institute in Round Top, Texas. Originally a space for private piano instruction and chamber music performance, it has since evolved into a multidisciplinary epicenter for performance of all kinds, constructed under the advisory and inspiration of Round Top Festival Institute founder, James Dick.

== History ==
The Festival Hill Concert Hall came after James Dick first established the Festival Institute in 1971. This festival first began with the intent to create a learning environment similar to the Aspen Music Festival and School and the Tanglewood Music Center. Before construction of the hall began in 1981, the festival featured the ‘Mary Moody Northen Pavilion’ as its primary performance space, which was used as the primary performing stage through 1983. Even while the hall was under construction, the space was utilized as a performance venue, with work being done year-round, adding pieces successively until it was ultimately ‘finished’ with the addition of a permanent stage in 1993. In the following years, there were many additions to the concert hall, including custom seating, intricately designed wooden paneling, and ornate staircases.

== Museum and music library ==
The Festival Hill Concert Hall also has an additional upper level that is home to the music library and the museum. The music library is used for the storage of performance materials, including scores, individual parts, programs, and recordings, both of professional and past festival performances. In direct collaboration with the music library, there is also the museum, which showcases the vast history of the festival. Collaboration comes in the fact that this museum contains the personal belongings of many renowned performers, musicians, and artists who have crossed paths with the Round Top Festival Institute. Some items of relevance include conducting materials used by Toscanini, the original plans for the construction of the Festival Hill Concert Hall, and an elaborate collection of letters proclaiming their admiration and appreciation for the impact that James Dick had created.

== Construction ==
With construction beginning in 1981, the construction of Festival Hill Concert Hall began under the supervision of founder, James Dick. Originally, there were no schematics nor blueprints created for this construction besides a presentation of two shapes for the concert hall: a rectangular shape and a wider fan-like shape. These remain the only preliminary designs proceeding the construction. As construction began, aspects of the venue were designed on the spot, with the advisory of acoustician Richard Boner. In 1981, the initial slab for the hall was poured. As the process began underway, more funding became available and the concert Hall gradually began to take shape. In 1983, the steel structure appeared in order to provide foundation for ceilings, walls, and a roof. In the following years, the ceiling, walls and other basic structures were added, with the addition of an air-conditioning system in 1985. The hall was not considered ‘finished’ until 1993, when the permanent stage was constructed, replacing the portable performance platform.

After its completion, the Festival Hill Concert Hall saw the addition of intricate wood paneling, custom seats, marble pillars, grandiose staircases, and detailed woodwork. The detailed woodwork and intricate wood paneling are entirely unique to Festival Hill. Along each of the balconies, there are a significant number of wood panels with entirely unique designs, hand-crafted by local woodworkers and architects. The same details found in these panels is seen in the designs featured on the ceiling. The construction of the ceiling/panels was done over time, providing the musicians with opportunities to experience the wide ranges of a single performance environment. In 2008, James Dick installed custom designed Festival Hill seating, with velvet red fabric and the crest of festival Hill embroidered on each seat. Prior to this, they simply used portable chairs to seat audiences.

== Acoustical design ==
While designing the concert hall, there were many considerations they had to address to provide the best-performing environment. This hall is not only used for orchestral performance, but it holds performances by chamber ensembles, instrumental soloists, and vocalists. Certain materials act as dampeners of sound, such as those used in carpets and fabric-backed chairs. In finding the ideal environment, the hall was originally conceived to contain as much solid material as possible. As a result, the vast majority of the hall is created using wood, with a few highlights made of marble or granite. Aside from the materials used, there were other logistical measures to be accounted for. The air-conditioning system lies almost entirely on the outside of the building, hanging over the side to minimize noise pollution within the concert hall. This unique design helped manage the concern of humidity/temperature inside the rather delicate concert hall while managing concerns regarding the listening experience.

== Significance ==
The addition of this concert hall to the Round Top Festival Institute, enabled the program to grow from its beginnings as a 10-day conference into an orchestral and chamber music Institute, ultimately living up to James Dick's dream of becoming renowned institution and music festival. With a population of 87 in the 2020 census, the small city of Round Top offers fellows each summer the chance to engage in their rich community of music making and storytelling. Without the construction of this concert hall, the Festival Hill Institute would not have been able to climb the ranks of elite summer-study programs.
