= KAMU-TV =

Television station in College Station, Texas

- College Station–Bryan, Texas; United States
- City: College Station, Texas
- Channels: Digital: 12 (VHF); Virtual: 12
- Branding: KAMU PBS

Programming
- Affiliations: 12.1: PBS; 12.2: Create; 12.3: PBS Kids

Ownership
- Owner: Texas A&M University

History
- First air date: February 15, 1970
- Former channel numbers: Analog: 15 (UHF, 1970–2009)
- Former affiliations: NET (February–October 1970)
- Call sign meaning: For owner Texas A&M University

Technical information
- Licensing authority: FCC
- Facility ID: 65301
- ERP: 3.2 kW
- HAAT: 105 m (344 ft)
- Transmitter coordinates: 30°37′48″N 96°20′34″W

Links
- Public license information: Public file; LMS
- Website: kamu.tamu.edu

KAMU-TV (channel 12) is the public television station of Texas A&M University in College Station, Texas, United States, airing programming from PBS. KAMU-TV and KAMU-FM 90.9, the university's NPR station, broadcast from studios on the third floor of the Innovative Learning Classroom Building on the university's campus on Lamar Street; KAMU-TV's transmitter is located nearby in Hensel Park.

In the 1960s, Texas A&M operated an educational television program with broadcast studios on the campus, but it did not have a transmitter until receiving a construction permit to build on channel 15 in 1969. KAMU-TV began broadcasting on February 15, 1970, as Texas A&M's first public broadcasting service. It aired national programming, first from National Educational Television and later PBS, as well as local programming for the Bryan–College Station area including Texas A&M sports programming and, from 1970 to 1985, a local newscast. Operating initially from Bagley Hall, KAMU-TV moved in 1972 to the Joe Hiram Moore Communications Center near Kyle Field, where it was joined by KAMU-FM in 1977. The division encompassing the KAMU stations, Educational Broadcast Services, served as the nucleus of A&M's television production operation, including for athletics, and of A&M's campus connectivity services.

KAMU began digital broadcasting in 2003 on channel 12 and continued to use that as its major channel number when it ceased analog broadcasting in 2009. In 2023, the KAMU stations moved to the Innovative Learning Classroom Building to make way for new facilities near Kyle Field. As one of PBS's smaller stations, KAMU-TV's local programming largely has focused on the Bryan–College Station community and Texas A&M. Similarly, the station is only available in the Waco–Temple portion of the market on satellite television providers.

== History ==
In January 1968, Texas A&M University (A&M) president James Earl Rudder authorized the university's Educational Television Program to prepare an application to the Department of Health, Education, and Welfare for federal funding to build and activate an educational television station on channel 15 in College Station, Texas. Though it had no transmitter, the A&M educational TV program already had all the necessary studio equipment for broadcasting, including a studio in Bagley Hall, and in 1967 had produced 123 hours of local programming that was distributed to six campus buildings. A&M set up an organizational committee to lead the establishment of the new station that June and in November applied to the Federal Communications Commission (FCC) for a construction permit. The FCC application was contingent on receiving federal funding. The funds and construction permit were awarded to A&M on August 1, 1969, days after the university announced it had purchased an outside broadcasting van from KTRK-TV in Houston and added color capability.

With only the installation of a transmitter facility necessary to go on the air, A&M set a launch date for KAMU-TV of December 15, 1969. Planned daily educational telecasts for public schools had been ruled out due to a fund timing issue, but the station was planned to start with National Educational Television (NET) programs and local programs from the Bagley Hall studio. However, a lengthy strike at General Electric (GE), which was manufacturing the transmitter, forced a 60-day delay in the station's debut. Instead, KAMU-TV made its first telecast on February 15, 1970, in the form of a 90-minute preview of station programs. The antenna was mounted atop the water tower on campus. It offered three regular local programs: the daily local news roundup Campus and Community Today, Viewpoint, and This Week. In its first year on air, the station suffered from reliability issues with the transmitter. The used GE transmitter failed 74 times on 24 different days—including on the first broadcast of Campus and Community Today—from the station's startup to March 27, when channel 15 left the air. Station director Mel Chastain declared, "KAMU-TV and Texas A&M will not operate an inferior facility." KAMU-TV was not back on the air until June 15, operating more reliably from that point onward. NET was supplanted as the public television network by PBS in late 1970. Aside from the debut, KAMU-TV operated on weekdays only until it made its first Sunday evening broadcasts in October 1971. One of every five programs on the station's air was a local production—a proportion more than double the national average for a PBS station.

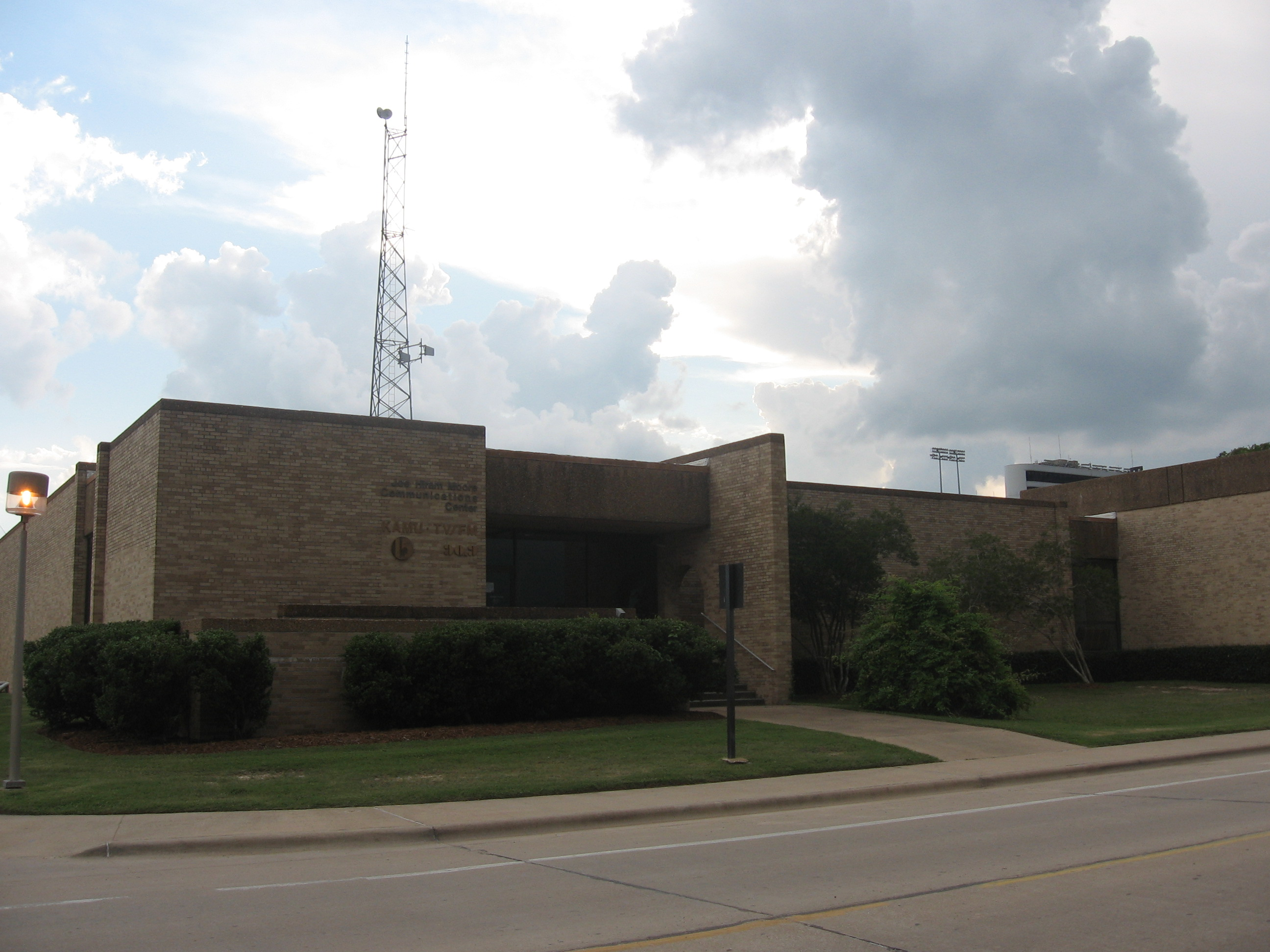
The Joe Hiram Moore Communications Center housed KAMU-TV from 1972 until 2023.

In 1972, A&M completed a new educational television center located southeast of Kyle Field. It replaced the old Bagley Hall with 17,000 square feet (1,600 m^{2}) of space and features such as equipment to air PBS programming live, two studios, and provision for a future FM radio station. A&M also built a new, 375-foot (114 m) tower at an off-campus location to expand KAMU-TV's reach. KAMU-TV was off the air from March 15 to December 23, 1972, to accommodate the new studio and transmitter facilities. When it returned, the station had regular hours on Saturdays. The new tower earned the station an FCC reprimand. A&M had asked for permission to paint the tower maroon and white instead of the standard orange and white, the colors of the rival University of Texas at Austin, which was denied by the Federal Aviation Administration. Nevertheless, the tower went up and was painted maroon and white. In January 1974, an FCC inspector visited the tower and issued a notice of violation; A&M repainted the tower that June and was chastised by the commission for its "irresponsible, casual attitude toward matters involving the safety of air traffic, toward representations to the FCC and toward compliance with the rules".

KAMU-FM began broadcasting on March 30, 1977, with programming from NPR. Later that year, KAMU-TV presented to public television stations nationwide a series of six half-hour programs in conjunction with Jacques Cousteau and the Cousteau Society. The series was KAMU's first national production and came about after people at Texas A&M University at Galveston met Cousteau, whose ship was in dry dock there. The building in which the KAMU stations operated was named for Joe Hiram Moore, an oil producer and 1938 A&M graduate and former president of the Association of Former Students. In 1978, Friends of KAMU was formed to raise funds for the television and radio stations. In 1981, KAMU produced another program for national distribution, the gardening series The Plant Kingdom.

Local news had been on the station's schedule since 1970, retitled by 1975 as 15 News. The half-hour newscast covered local news and utilized the resources of Texas A&M journalism students. It was canceled in 1985 amid budget cuts at KAMU-TV. The station had in the preceding years dropped Nova and American Playhouse to save costs and came close to removing The MacNeil/Lehrer NewsHour, which was kept after support from the annual on-air auction. In 1986, KAMU was connected to the Texas Video Network, enabling Texas A&M to originate interviews with faculty for national media by way of microwave transmission and satellite uplink. Previously, programs used a rented uplink, as was the case when Phil Gramm and Lloyd Doggett held a U.S. Senate debate at KAMU in 1984.

Much of KAMU's local programming gave the station an Aggie flavor. It annually telecast the 1943 film We've Never Been Licked, which was filmed on the A&M campus, and originated telecasts of Aggie Bonfire. When the bonfire collapsed in 1999, the event was live streamed—but not recorded—by KAMU. KAMU also handled production for the Texas A&M athletic department, including the football coaches' show aired by commercial stations statewide, and aired replays of football games. It also annually aired a broadcast of Bryan's Christmas parade.

KAMU's founding director, Mel Chastain, departed in 1987 to take a new role at Kansas State University. In the years that followed, KAMU received two federal matching grants for new equipment, to which A&M's contribution represented the first capital expenditure by the university in the stations since their launch. In 1991, EBS set up the Trans-Texas Videoconference Network, which used digital video compression and telephone circuits to connect the Texas A&M University System's far-flung campuses. This network evolved into the system's intranet. KAMU was a smaller PBS station and for most of its early history did not buy all of PBS's programs, except for several years in the early 1980s. KAMU later became a "limited-use" station with fewer PBS programs and lower dues, until PBS restructured its dues and eliminated this option in 1995. At the time, 28 percent of its funding came from the Corporation for Public Broadcasting (CPB).

In March 2003, KAMU was the first local station to broadcast a digital signal, on channel 12. At about the same time, a new data network based in College Station entered service, connecting all of Texas's PBS member stations. KAMU's first live high-definition program aired on April 22, 2004. In 2009, KAMU-TV became digital-only; its digital signal continued on channel 12.

Texas A&M's athletic department and the 12th Man Foundation launched the Centennial Campaign in 2022 to construct new athletic-related facilities in the area south of Kyle Field housing the KAMU studios. The KAMU stations moved in 2023 to the third floor of the Innovative Learning Classroom Building, making way for a plaza next to the new Adam Sinn Academic and Wellness Center.

== Market ==
Though Bryan–College Station shares a television market with Killeen and Waco for commercial stations, KAMU has generally only served the Bryan–College Station half. Central Texas College put KNCT (channel 46) on the air in 1970; Waco was served via cable by KNCT and KERA-TV of Dallas, with KCTF (channel 34, later KWBU-TV) beginning in Waco in 1989 as a local station. KWBU-TV shut down in 2010, with KNCT replacing it on cable. When KNCT was sold to Gray Television in 2018, KAMU-TV was made available on satellite but not added as a replacement on cable in the Waco area, which instead received KLRU of Austin.

== Local programming ==
KAMU-TV airs several video podcast versions of radio shows and podcasts, some of which also air on KAMU-FM. These include the public affairs series Brazos Matters and politics podcast Inside Political Science, featuring experts from the Bush School of Government and Public Service. The Bookmark features interviews of authors with new books published by Texas A&M University Press.

== Funding ==
In fiscal year 2024, KAMU-TV reported to the CPB $2.798 million in revenue, of which $1.089 million (38.9%) came from the CPB and $646,605 came from Texas A&M University. The station had 1,399 members in that year.

== Subchannels ==
KAMU-TV's transmitter is located in Hensel Park in College Station. The station's signal is multiplexed:

Subchannels of KAMU-TV
| Subchannel | Res. | Short name | Programming |
|---|---|---|---|
| 12.1 | 1080i | PBS | PBS |
| 12.2 | 720p | Create | Create |
| 12.3 | 720p | Kids | PBS Kids |

== See also ==
- List of television stations in Texas
- Channel 12 digital TV stations in the United States
- Channel 12 virtual TV stations in the United States
