= Round Top Festival Institute =

Coordinates: 30.078°N 96.693°W

The Round Top Festival Institute is a performing arts center established in 1971 by pianist James Dick in Round Top, Texas. The main focus of the institute is the Round Top Music Festival, a six-week summer orchestral training program that runs in June and July. The institute also presents an annual "August to April Series" in which they host a wide variety of artists, forums, and performances.

== See also ==
- Festival Hill Concert Hall
