= WEAN-FM =

Simulcast of WPRO (AM), Providence
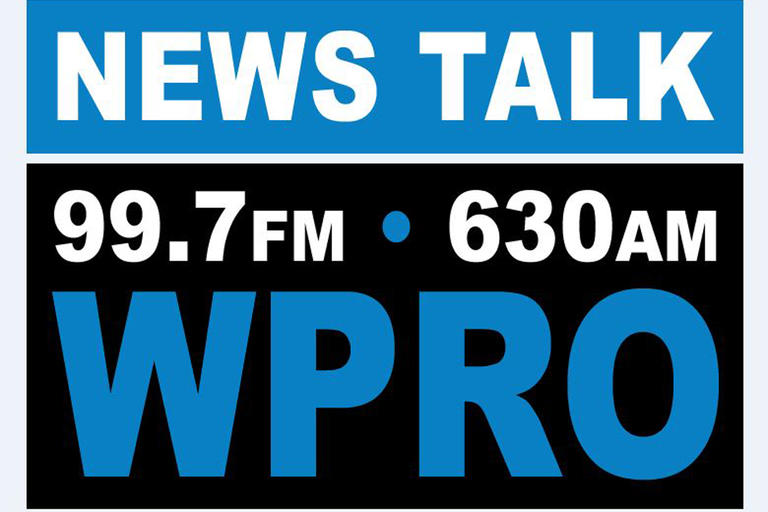
- Wakefield-Peacedale, Rhode Island; United States
- Broadcast area: Washington County, Rhode Island
- Frequency: 99.7 MHz
- Branding: News Talk 99.7FM and 630AM WPRO

Programming
- Format: News/talk
- Affiliations: ABC News Radio; CBS News Radio; NBC News Radio; Radio America; Westwood One; New England Patriots Radio Network

Ownership
- Owner: Cumulus Media; (Radio License Holding CBC, LLC)
- Sister stations: WPRO; WPRO-FM; WPRV; WWKX; WWLI

History
- First air date: June 1995
- Former call signs: WUAE (1992–1995); WDGE (1995–1997); WXEX (1997–1999); WHCK (1999–2000); WZRA (2000–2002); WSKO-FM (2002–2008)
- Call sign meaning: Former callsign for WPRV, which was a longtime all-news station as "79 WEAN"

Technical information
- Licensing authority: FCC
- Facility ID: 4376
- Class: A
- ERP: 2,300 watts
- HAAT: 163 meters (535 ft)
- Transmitter coordinates: 41°34′23″N 71°37′56″W

Links
- Public license information: Public file; LMS
- Webcast: Listen live
- Website: www.997wpro.com

WEAN-FM (99.7 MHz, "News Talk 99.7 FM & AM 630 WPRO") is a radio station licensed to serve Wakefield-Peacedale, Rhode Island, United States. The station is owned by Cumulus Media, and airs a news/talk format. WEAN-FM is a full-time simulcast of WPRO (630 AM) in Providence, serving as WPRO's satellite in southern Rhode Island. Operations are based at WPRO's studios in East Providence.

Prior to becoming WEAN-FM on March 11, 2008, 99.7 was modern rock "99.7 The Edge" WUAE, later WDGE; hard rock "99.7X" WXEX; classic rock simulcast "The Hawk"; 1980s music simulcast "Z100" (as WZRA) and finally "The Score" (WSKO-FM), which broadcast a sports radio format that simulcast most programming from WSKO (now WPRV).

== Programming ==
As a simulcast of WPRO, much of WEAN-FM's programming is locally produced, with programs hosted by WJAR anchor Gene Vallicenti, Matt Allen, Dan Yorke, and former WLNE-TV reporter Tara Granahan. Syndicated programming includes John Batchelor and Red Eye Radio.

Weekend programming includes the John Loughlin Show, Steve Klamkin and the WPRO Saturday Morning News, locally produced brokered shows as well as syndicated shows such as Bill Cunningham.

WEAN-FM is an affiliate of the New England Patriots Radio Network.

== History ==
=== 1990s ===
The station was issued its first call sign, WUAE, on April 23, 1992. It would remain a construction permit until June 1995, when it would sign on as modern rock WDGE "99.7 The Edge". The station was built by local broadcast engineer Randy Place. Starting with the acquisition of former smooth jazz station WOTB in 1996 (which became WDGF on June 14, 1996), The Edge advertised itself as "99.7/100.3 The Edge." This simulcast would last a short time as the 100.3 frequency became "100.3 The Beat". Meanwhile, WDGE began leaning towards hard rock and became WXEX, calling itself "99.7X", in November 1997. This format lasted until January 1, 1999, when it returned to simulcasting 100.3 as "100FM The Hawk".

=== 2000s ===
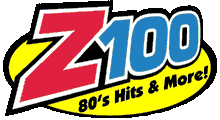
Former logo under the "Z100" branding

The 2000s started with 99.7 still simulcasting 100.3 as "The Hawk". Both stations would flip formats again, this time to all-1980s "Z100" (still as a simulcast). In 2002, 99.7 turned off its stereo pilot and became sports talk "99.7 The Score", or most times when simulcasting WSKO, "99.7 and 790 The Score". WSKO-FM carried the Patriots Rock Radio Network (which it still does as a simulcast of WPRO), Pawsox Radio Network until 2006 (those rights went to WHJJ in 2007) as well as the New York Yankees Radio Network until 2007 (the former AM side of The Score, now WPRV, still carries the Yankees). "The Score" ended on March 10, 2008, with the AM side becoming WPRV "True Oldies 790", and 99.7 becoming WEAN-FM and simulcasting WPRO (AM).
