= WPRO-FM =

Contemporary hit radio station in Providence, Rhode Island

- Providence, Rhode Island; United States
- Broadcast area: Providence metropolitan area
- Frequency: 92.3 MHz (HD Radio)
- Branding: 92 Pro FM

Programming
- Language: English
- Format: Contemporary hit radio
- Affiliations: United Stations Radio Networks; Westwood One

Ownership
- Owner: Cumulus Media; (Radio License Holding CBC, LLC)
- Sister stations: WEAN-FM; WPRO; WPRV; WWKX; WWLI

History
- First air date: April 17, 1948
- Call sign meaning: Providence (call sign originated with sister station WPRO)

Technical information
- Licensing authority: FCC
- Facility ID: 64841
- Class: B
- ERP: 39,000 watts
- HAAT: 168 meters (551 ft)
- Transmitter coordinates: 41°48′17″N 71°28′22″W

Links
- Public license information: Public file; LMS
- Webcast: Listen live
- Website: www.92profm.com

WPRO-FM (92.3 MHz "92 PRO-FM") is a commercial contemporary hit radio station in Providence, Rhode Island, United States, owned by Cumulus Media.

The station's studios and offices are located in the Brine Broadcasting Center on Wampanoag Trail on the East Providence–Barrington line. Its transmitter is located on Neutaconkanut Hill in Johnston, Rhode Island. WPRO-FM is unique in the Providence media market in keeping the same call sign since its sign-on in 1948; and the same format, top 40, since 1974.

== History ==
Cherry & Webb Broadcasting Company, owners of WPRO (AM 630), applied for a construction permit for a new high frequency broadcasting station on 47.5 MHz on October 29, 1940. An amended application was filed January 15, 1941, and was finally granted by the Federal Communications Commission (FCC) on June 12, 1947, with its new frequency of 92.3 MHz in the new FM band. WPRO-FM began broadcasting on April 17, 1948. The Cherry & Webb Broadcasting Company, in turn, was owned by the Cherry & Webb Department Store. (In the early days of broadcasting, it was common for department stores to own radio stations, to provide programming for customers who bought receivers.) At first, WPRO-FM simulcast its AM sister station, WPRO. In 1959, Capital Cities Communications acquired both WPRO and WPRO-FM. Through the 1960s and early 1970s, WPRO-FM aired a beautiful music format, while WPRO AM enjoyed high ratings with a top 40 format.

=== Switch to Top 40 ===
On April 29, 1974, at 3:00 pm, WPRO-FM changed formats from easy listening, joining its AM counterpart as a top 40 outlet. The influential sound and feel of the station's new format was crafted by WPRO-FM's first program director Gary Berkowitz. The initial on-air staff included up-and-coming radio luminaries including Big John Bina, Tony Bristol, Tom Cuddy, Daniel 'Giovanni' Centofanti (who celebrated 50 years on the air in April 2024), and Jimmy Gray, in addition to future music industry executives and radio broadcasters including Al Gomes, Vic Michaels, and John Leahy. Howard Hoffman, Rocky Allen, and Bruce Diamond would later join the station as its popularity surged.

Over time, the AM moved toward an adult top 40 direction, adding more information and service features, while WPRO-FM continued as a music-intensive top 40 outlet. Capital Cities and ABC merged in 1985, and WPRO-AM-FM were then under the ownership of one of America's biggest broadcasting companies.

=== Cap Cities sells WPRO-AM-FM ===
In December 1992, Capital Cities/ABC announced that the WPRO stations would be sold to Tele-Media, with the sale being consummated the following April. This put the stations under common ownership with WLKW and WWLI. Tele-Media, in turn, sold its stations to Citadel Broadcasting in 1997. Citadel merged with Cumulus Media on September 16, 2011.

== Notable WPRO-FM alumni ==
- Rocky Allen
- Bruce Diamond
- Don Geronimo
- Al Gomes
- Howard Hoffman
