= WPRI-TV =

Television station in Providence, Rhode Island

- Providence, Rhode Island; New Bedford, Massachusetts; United States
- City: Providence, Rhode Island
- Channels: Digital: 7 (VHF); Virtual: 12
- Branding: WPRI 12; 12 News Now; MyRITV (12.2)

Programming
- Affiliations: 12.1: CBS; 12.2: Independent with MyNetworkTV; for others, see § Subchannels

Ownership
- Owner: Nexstar Media Group; (Nexstar Media Inc.)
- Sister stations: WNAC-TV

History
- First air date: March 27, 1955
- Former call signs: WPRO-TV (1955–1967)
- Former channel numbers: Analog: 12 (VHF, 1955–2009); Digital: 13 (VHF, 2003–2019)
- Former affiliations: CBS (1955–1977); ABC (1977–1995; secondary 1955–1963)
- Call sign meaning: Providence, Rhode Island

Technical information
- Licensing authority: FCC
- Facility ID: 47404
- ERP: 27 kW
- HAAT: 310.6 m (1,019 ft)
- Transmitter coordinates: 41°52′14″N 71°17′43″W

Links
- Public license information: Public file; LMS
- Website: wpri.com; MyRITV.com

WPRI-TV (channel 12) is a television station in Providence, Rhode Island, United States, affiliated with CBS and MyNetworkTV. It is owned by Nexstar Media Group and operated alongside WNAC-TV (channel 64), an affiliate of Fox and The CW. The two stations share studios on Catamore Boulevard in East Providence, Rhode Island; WPRI-TV's transmitter is located on Pine Street in Rehoboth, Massachusetts.

== History ==
=== WPRO-TV (1955–1967) ===
The station debuted on March 27, 1955, known as WPRO-TV (for Providence). It was Rhode Island's third television station and was owned and operated, along with WPRO radio (630 AM and 92.3 FM), by retailer Cherry & Webb. WPRO-TV was originally supposed to go on the air in 1953, but the station ran into several delays. It had originally planned to build a transmitter in Rehoboth, Massachusetts, but legal disputes with town officials forced Cherry & Webb to find a site in Johnston, Rhode Island.

The station then planned to sign on in 1954, but Hurricane Carol destroyed the Johnston transmitter. The legal disputes in Rehoboth were finally settled in late 1954, and WPRO got the go-ahead to begin construction there. Channel 12 was due to join CBS because of WPRO radio's long affiliation with CBS Radio. Even when it became apparent that WPRO-TV would miss its target air date, CBS opted to continue its secondary affiliation with NBC station WJAR-TV (channel 10) rather than move its programming to ABC affiliate WNET (channel 16, the predecessor of today's WNAC-TV).

When WPRO-TV finally came on the air, ABC gave it right of first refusal for its more popular shows. Within less than a year, WNET had gone dark. Channel 12 continued to share ABC with WJAR until WTEV (channel 6, now WLNE-TV) signed-on in 1963.

WPRO-TV's studios were originally located on the top floor of 24 Mason Street in Downtown Providence with its sister radio stations. The three stations' news facilities were completely integrated. On-air personalities from radio and TV created newscasts together. Some reporters recorded conservative-sounding FM news broadcasts prior to pulling a switch to deliver live, punchy on-air news for the AM station on the hour, with headlines on the half-hour. Some radio news reporters headed into the field with photographers to cover stories simultaneously for radio and TV.

Legendary Providence radio personality Salty Brine had a daily children's show on WPRO-TV. News personalities included Mort Blender and Walter Cryan while Hank Bouchard did a multitude of on-air duties. That included announcing, hosting programs, and giving the weather report. Cherry & Webb sold WPRO-AM-FM-TV to Albany, New York–based Capital Cities Television Corporation, the predecessor of Capital Cities Communications, in 1959, earning a handsome return on its purchase of WPRO radio in 1931.

=== WPRI (1967–present) ===
WPRO-TV was then sold to Poole Broadcasting (owners of WJRT-TV in Flint, Michigan) on July 18, 1967; that sale was necessary because CapCities' purchase of KTRK-TV in Houston left it one VHF station over the Federal Communications Commission (FCC) ownership limit at the time. Since CapCities retained the WPRO radio stations, Poole Broadcasting, so as to comply with an FCC regulation in place then that required TV and radio stations in the same market, but with different owners to use differing call signs, changed channel 12's call letters to the present WPRI-TV. It wanted to trade on the well-known WPRO calls and also realized that "PRI" could stand for Providence, Rhode Island. CapCities retained ownership of the WPRO radio stations until 1993, with the last seven years of their ownership saw the stations being ABC-owned stations affiliated with the ABC Radio Network. However, the three stations continued to share the Mason Street studio until 1974, when they moved to separate facilities in East Providence. Poole retained ownership of channel 12 until 1977 when it sold its three television stations (WPRI, WJRT, and WTEN in Albany, New York) to Knight Ridder Broadcasting. WPRI swapped affiliations with WTEV and became an ABC affiliate on June 27, 1977, after this sale as a result of a corporate affiliation deal between ABC and Knight Ridder (WTEN, then a CBS station, would switch to ABC several months later in October; WPRI's former owners, Capital Cities Communications, would later buy ABC in 1985).

On June 30, 1989, Knight Ridder left the broadcasting business, selling WPRI and WTKR in Norfolk, Virginia, to Narragansett Television LP, a locally based firm. Narragansett Television sold WPRI to CBS in early 1995, making it a network owned-and-operated station (and one of the last such acquisitions prior to the Westinghouse Electric Corporation's purchase of the network). At midnight on September 10, 1995, WPRI reversed the 1977 swap with WLNE and officially rejoined CBS. It aired a vigorous promotion called "Survive the Switch" so television viewers in Providence would be prepared for this changeover.

In August 1995, Westinghouse bought CBS for approximately $6 billion. The merger was finalized on November 24. Westinghouse already owned WBZ-TV in Boston; like most of the major Boston stations, WBZ-TV provided at at least grade B coverage to all of Rhode Island, and could be seen at city-grade strength in Providence itself and the Massachusetts side of the market (New Bedford and Fall River). WPRI's city-grade signal, like most of the other major Rhode Island stations, decently covers most of the Boston area. At the time, the FCC normally did not allow common ownership of multiple stations with overlapping coverage areas, and would not even consider granting a waiver for a city-grade overlap. As a result, CBS opted to keep WBZ-TV and sell WPRI to Clear Channel Communications on July 1, 1996, after less than ten months of ownership. Just months after the sale was announced, the FCC eliminated the requirement of a waiver for common ownership of television stations in adjacent markets with substantial grade B signal overlap. It began to permit common ownership of stations whose city-grade signals overlap when duopolies began to be permitted in 2000.

=== LIN TV era (2000–2014) ===
In 2000, Clear Channel was forced to sell WPRI as a condition of being allowed to buy additional radio stations in the Providence market. Sunrise Television acquired WPRI in early 2001 for $50 million. Sunrise merged with LIN TV in May 2002.

In October 2008, WPRI and sister station WALA-TV in Mobile, Alabama, relaunched websites through News Corporation's Fox Interactive Media, since spun off as the independent company known as EndPlay. It, in turn, was acquired by the Nexstar Broadcasting Group in 2014 and merged with its two other CMS providers, Inergize Digital and Internet Broadcasting to form a new CMS unit, Lakana, as a result of a new partnership between LIN TV and NewsCorp. The other LIN TV-owned stations (irrespective of network affiliations) followed suit within two months ending the company's long partnership with WorldNow. The new sites were in a format similar to those of the Fox O&O-style web addresses used by many Fox affiliates (and which the LIN TV-owned or controlled Fox affiliates such as WNAC-TV had used) except the flashy myFox look. The MyFox sites themselves were eventually redesigned to a look similar to those of the LIN TV sites. After Nexstar's acquisition of EndPlay was completed, the LIN station Web sites switched to the WordPress.com VIP CMS platform. Most of the Web sites of the television stations Media General acquired since the announced merger with Young Broadcasting have also adopted this platform.

=== LMA with WNAC-TV (1997–present) ===
Shortly after Clear Channel took over the station, WPRI entered in a local marketing agreement (LMA) with Fox affiliate WNAC (then owned by Argyle Television). WPRI took over the station's operations on September 28, 1997, when WNAC moved its operations into this station's facilities. WNAC operates under the license of the old WNET, which was forced off-the-air in 1955 largely due to the presence of WPRI. In late 1997, Argyle merged with Hearst Broadcasting, owner of ABC affiliate WCVB-TV in Boston. Due to FCC rules that effectively banned common ownership of stations with overlapping city-grade signals (the same rule that forced CBS to sell WPRI two years earlier), Hearst could not keep both WCVB and WNAC. It opted to trade WNAC together with WDTN in Dayton, Ohio (which had to be sold to alleviate a similar overlap conflict with WLWT in Cincinnati), to Sunrise Television in return for WPTZ in Plattsburgh, New York, WNNE in Hartford, Vermont, and KSBW in Salinas, California.

When Sunrise bought WPRI from Clear Channel in early 2001, WNAC was sold to LIN TV due to FCC regulations forbidding common ownership of two of the four highest-rated stations in the same market. In this case, WNAC could not be co-owned directly with WPRI. However, LIN TV was forced to put WNAC back on the market almost as soon as it closed on the station's purchase due to the ownership structures of Sunrise and LIN TV. Hicks, Muse, Tate & Furst (forerunner to HM Capital Partners), a private-equity firm co-founded by Texas Rangers and Dallas Stars then-owner Tom Hicks, was the majority owner of LIN TV. At the same time, HMTF also controlled a large block of Sunrise stock. The FCC ruled that HMTF controlled enough Sunrise stock that the company could not own any stations in markets where LIN TV-owned a station as well.

Finally, in April 2002, LIN TV sold WNAC to Super Towers, Inc. (d/b/a WNAC, LLC), a company owned by Timothy Sheehan, brother-in-law of former LIN TV Vice President Paul Karpowicz. This sale allowed the merger between Sunrise and LIN TV to be completed the following month. LIN TV continued to operate WNAC under the same LMA it inherited from Sunrise.

=== Merger with Media General, then Nexstar (2014–present) ===
On March 21, 2014, LIN Media entered into an agreement to merge with Media General in a $1.6 billion deal. Because Media General already owned NBC affiliate WJAR and the two stations ranked as the two highest-rated stations in the Providence market in total day viewership, the companies were required to sell either WJAR or WPRI-TV to another station owner to comply with FCC ownership rules as well as planned changes to those rules regarding same-market television stations which would prohibit sharing agreements; the LMA involving WNAC would be included in the sale. On August 20, 2014, Media General announced that it would keep WPRI and the LMA with WNAC and sell WJAR to Sinclair Broadcast Group, even though WJAR had higher ratings. The merger was completed on December 19, 2014.

On January 27, 2016, Nexstar Broadcasting Group announced plans to merge with Media General. The merger was completed on January 17, 2017.

== WPRI-DT2 ==
WPRI-DT2, branded on-air as MyRITV, is the MyNetworkTV-affiliated second digital subchannel of WPRI-TV, broadcasting on channel 12.2. Ever since its inception, WPRI-DT2's over-the-air signal had broadcast in 480i standard definition; however, in October 2017, it was upgraded to 720p high definition.

On October 22, 2010, WPRI began carrying TheCoolTV music video programming on its 12.2 subchannel; it was replaced by Bounce TV in July 2013. On October 2, 2017, the Bounce TV subchannel was moved to channel 12.3, replacing GetTV, which moved to a newly created 12.4 subchannel. This was to accommodate the move of MyRITV, the market's MyNetworkTV affiliate, from WNAC-DT2 to WPRI-DT2 as part of a broader shuffle where the programming and CW affiliation of WLWC's main channel was purchased by Nexstar several months before after WLWC's owner, OTA Broadcasting, sold their spectrum in the FCC's 2016 incentive auction and decided on a channel share with WPXQ-TV. That day, MyRITV was moved to WPRI-DT2 (so that WLWC's programming could, in turn, be moved to WNAC-DT2), to balance bandwidth among all four of Nexstar's major network affiliations in Providence. Thus WPRI has a 1080i CBS channel and 720p MyNetworkTV subchannel, with WNAC having a 720p Fox channel and 720p CW subchannel.

On October 1, 2009, WNAC-DT2 became the market's MyNetworkTV affiliate after the service was moved from the main WNAC feed. Before this change, the main channel had aired the network in a secondary manner delaying weeknight prime time programming from 11:30 to 1:30 in the morning and Saturday prime time programming until early Sunday mornings from 12:30 to 2:30. In 2011, WNAC-DT2 televised local college basketball games on Wednesdays under the banner "Game Night".

== News operation ==
Traditionally, WPRI has been a solid, if usually distant, runner-up in the ratings to long-dominant WJAR. In the February and May 2010 Nielsen ratings period, WPRI was second in all timeslots, with its 6 p.m. newscast reaching nearly 20,000 fewer viewers than WJAR's newscast. Since then, however, WPRI has mounted a spirited challenge to WJAR's dominance.

Specifically, its broadcast weeknights at 11 p.m. has gained enormous popularity. As of the November 2010 sweeps period, this newscast on WPRI is the most watched in Rhode Island while WJAR continues its dominance in all other time periods.

In September 1993, the station created a 30-minute 5 p.m. newscast, the first in the market. It was expanded to one hour in mid-1995.

In 1996, WPRI began producing the market's first nightly prime time newscast at 10 p.m. on WNAC, then titled Eyewitness News at 10 on Fox Providence. This was joined in April 1997 by a WJAR-produced show seen weeknights on WLWC entitled TV 28 News at 10. However, that was dropped in September when the WJAR LMA with WLWC ended. In 2004, an hour-long extension of WPRI's weekday morning show was added to WNAC at 7 a.m. branded as Eyewitness News This Morning on Fox Providence. It was eventually canceled, but was brought back early in 2009 as a lead-in to The Rhode Show. Meteorologist Michelle Muscatello joined WPRI in 2004, and was the morning weather presenter until 2023.

WPRI and WNAC received an on-air overhaul introducing a new news set and updated graphics on March 17, 2008. LIN operated a shared Bell 206L3 Long Ranger helicopter with the registration N812TV branded as "News Chopper 12" until December 2008, which was shared with Connecticut sister station WTNH and had that station's imaging on the right, with WPRI's imaging on its left side.

On February 18, 2009, WNAC launched an hour-long lifestyle and entertainment magazine-type program called The Rhode Show that aired weekday mornings at 8 a.m. A new secondary set for the show was built with a fully functional kitchen. The show was previously hosted by the weekday morning news anchor teams— Vince DeMentri and Elizabeth Hopkins from February 2009 to March 2010, Patrick Little and Hopkins from March 2010 to November 2010, and Little and Danielle North from November 2010 to December 2011. A third alternating host for a period of one year was found annually through an open audition in a contest titled The Rhode Show Search for a Star. In 2008, Boston-area radio deejay Shawn Tempesta won the contest out of over 140 people. In 2009, Cranston comedian Ben Hague beat out over 100 other hopefuls. Bridgewater State University graduate Michaela Johnson of East Providence won the honor in 2010. During the week, The Rhode Show was streamed live on WNAC's website. The main channel re-aired the show weekday afternoons at 1 p.m. with WNAC-DT2 (MyRITV, now WPRI-DT2) doing the same at 4 p.m.

In December 2011, it was announced that on January 9, 2012, The Rhode Show would move to WPRI and would begin at 9 a.m. Michaela Johnson and former WPRO-FM personality Will Gilbert became permanent hosts of the show. Mary Larsen was selected as the third host in the 2011 Search for a Star contest. MyRITV continued to re-air the show at 2 p.m. on weekdays until 2013. In addition, Eyewitness News This Morning on Fox Providence was extended to fill the hour previously occupied by The Rhode Show. This newscast now airs between 7 a.m. and 9 a.m.

WPRI operated a 24-hour local weather channel under the branding "Eyewitness News Pinpoint Weather Station", on Cox digital channel 125. It also aired on the second digital subchannels of WPRI and WNAC until 2007, but went cable-only due to children's programming restrictions (also known as E/I programming). It was then simulcast on weekends when the main channels of WPRI and WNAC signed off overnight. The weather channel was eliminated in 2010. Now during sign off hours on weekend overnights, a loop of the stations' Doppler radar is shown.

Along with its own weather radar at its transmitter site in Rehoboth, the station also features live NOAA National Weather Service radar data from the Local Forecast Office on Myles Standish Boulevard in Taunton. Together, this is known in weather segments as "Live Pinpoint Doppler 12". It shares resources with WBZ-TV for coverage of Southeastern Massachusetts. In return, WPRI does the same for its coverage of the same area. All of WPRI and WNAC's weekday newscasts are streamed live on WPRI's website and mobile app. They also replay their most recent newscast on a continuous loop until the next live newscast and stream breaking news events.

Eyewitness News has won the Massachusetts/Rhode Island Associated Press News Station of the Year award nine years in a row since 2004, its most recent coming in May 2012.

WPRI and WNAC were the last stations in the market to upgrade their newscasts to high definition, though they were first to experiment with the format through promotional materials and debates during the election season in 2010. Set reconfiguration began on July 22, 2011. Newscasts in the interim aired from The Rhode Show studio. WJAR was the first in Rhode Island to have made the upgrade, on May 16, 2011, followed by WLNE on September 13, 2011. They debuted the new set and modified graphics on September 20, 2011, during their 5 p.m. newscast. On January 13, 2014, WPRI announced that it would be expanding its early evening news by launching a 6:30 p.m. newscast on WNAC on January 27.

On August 31, 2020, WPRI dropped the Eyewitness News branding after 18 years; WPRI's newscasts are now branded as 12 News, while WNAC's newscasts are now branded as 12 News Now on Fox Providence.

WPRI's long-running weekend public affairs show, Newsmakers, debuted on September 17, 1978, and is still on the air. Its current hosts are Tim White and Ted Nesi.

=== Notable former on-air staff ===
- Karen Adams – 5, 6 and 11 p.m. news anchor (1989–2010)
- Ernie Anastos – news anchor (1976–1978)
- Jess Atkinson – sports director (1996–2000)
- Salty Brine – concurrent with WPRO/630
- Steve Cascione – meteorologist (2002–2007)
- Walter Cryan – 6 and 11 p.m. news anchor (1965–2000)
- John Daly
- Vince DeMentri – news anchor (1990–1992, 2009–2010)
- Mike Gorman – sports director (1978–1985)
- Mark Haines (1976–1979)
- Kristine Johnson – news anchor/reporter (1997–2006)
- Camille Kostek – guest anchor for The Rhode Show in 2015
- Harvey Leonard – chief meteorologist (1974–1977)
- Deb Placey – sports anchor/reporter
- Charles Rocket – news anchor
- Bob Ryan (1971–1972)
- Jack White

== Technical information ==
=== Subchannels ===
WPRI-TV broadcasts from a transmitter facility in Rehoboth, Massachusetts. Its signal is multiplexed:

Subchannels of WPRI-TV
Subchannel	Res.	Short name	Programming
12.1	1080i	WPRI-HD	CBS
12.2	720p	MYRI	Independent with MyNetworkTV
12.3	480i	TruCrim	True Crime Network
12.4	480i	DeFy	Defy

=== Analog-to-digital conversion ===
WPRI-TV received FCC consent to end regular programming on its analog signal, over VHF channel 12, on February 17, 2009, the original date when full-power television stations in the United States were to transition from analog to digital broadcasts under federal mandate (which was later pushed back to June 12, 2009). The station's digital signal remained on its pre-transition VHF channel 13, using virtual channel 12. WNAC-TV also discontinued regular analog service on February 17, 2009, and began operation of its new digital facility on channel 12. WPRI is also one of the only remaining TV stations in America to sign-off and sign-on once a week to this day.

== See also ==
- Channel 7 digital TV stations in the United States
- Channel 12 virtual TV stations in the United States
