= Infrared Physics and Technology =

- Discipline: Physics
- Language: English

Publication details
- History: to present
- Publisher: Elsevier
- Impact factor: 2.638 (2020)

Standard abbreviations
- ISO 4: Infrared Phys. Technol.

Indexing
- ISSN: 1350-4495

Links
- Journal homepage

Infrared Physics and Technology is a peer-reviewed scientific journal published by Elsevier devoted to the publication of new experimental and theoretical papers about applications of physics to the field of infrared physics and technology.

The current editor is Harvey Rutt, at the University of Southampton.
