= WBQP-CD =

Television station in Pensacola, Florida

- Pensacola, Florida; Mobile, Alabama; United States
- City: Pensacola, Florida
- Channels: Digital: 12 (VHF), to move to 33 (UHF); Virtual: 12
- Branding: WBQP TV 12

Programming
- Affiliations: see § Subchannels

Ownership
- Owner: Watson Broadcasting Inc. of Pensacola, Florida; (Vernon Watson)

History
- Founded: October 25, 1991
- First air date: June 19, 1992
- Former call signs: W12CN (1991–1995); WBQP-LP (1995–2001); WBQP-CA (2001–2012)
- Former affiliations: Shop at Home Network (1992–1995); The WB (1995–1996); America One (1996–2001); Urban America Television (2001–2006); Punch TV (2011–2015); Impact Network (2014); WRNE simulcast (until 2022); theGrio (2022–2025)

Technical information
- Licensing authority: FCC
- Facility ID: 69993
- Class: CD
- ERP: 3 kW; 15 kW (CP)
- HAAT: 93.9 m (308 ft); 134.1 m (440 ft) (CP)
- Transmitter coordinates: 30°25′59.9″N 87°13′8.7″W; 30°26′37.2″N 87°14′3.9″W (CP)

Links
- Public license information: Public file; LMS
- Website: wbqptv.com

WBQP-CD (channel 12) is a low-power, Class A television station in Pensacola, Florida, United States. It is owned by Vernon and Mary Lynn Watson, who were the first African Americans to own a broadcast television station in Pensacola.

== History ==
The Federal Communications Commission (FCC) licensed Vernon Watson to broadcast on channel 12 in Pensacola, Florida, on June 19, 1992. The FCC then assigned the translator-style callsign W12CN to the station. In 1994 and 1995, the station was struggling to be added the local cable system and to have their TV schedule listed in the local newspapers—typical among most low-power TV stations. In March 1995, the station became the WB affiliate for Pensacola. In September 1995, the station's call sign was changed from W12CN to WBQP-LP; later that month, the station was added to the local cable system. The WB affiliation eventually moved to WFGX (channel 35, now an independent station with MyNetworkTV) the following year, and then to WBPG (channel 55, now CW station WFNA) in 2001.

== Subchannels ==
The station's signal is multiplexed:

Subchannels of WBQP-CD
Subchannel	Res.	Short name	Programming
12.1	480i	WBQP	Infomercials (4:3)
12.2	480i	URBT TV	Quinnly TV (4:3)
12.3	480i	RETRO	Retro TV (4:3)
12.4	480i	HOLYFD	The Family Channel (4:3)
12.5	480i	YOU TOO	NOST (4:3)
12.6	480i	50-60TV	Wynn Network (4:3)
12.7	480i	MUSIC	Music videos (4:3)
12.8	480i	WORD	The Word Network (4:3)
12.9	480i		YTA TV (4:3)
12.10	480i		SilverSpurTV (4:3)
