= Salty Brine =

American television personality (1918–2004)

Salty Brine

Walter Leslie Brine (August 5, 1918 – November 2, 2004), known professionally as Salty Brine, was a well-known broadcaster in Rhode Island.

== Early life ==
At age 10, he lost one of his legs, attempting to jump onto a freight train near his home in Arlington, Massachusetts. In later life, he would visit hospitals to encourage other children who had lost limbs.

== Broadcasting history ==
=== Radio ===
==== Massachusetts ====
Salty's first jobs were in his native state of Massachusetts with WNAC, Boston; WESX, Salem; and WCOP, Boston.

==== WPRO ====
In September 1942, Salty joined WPRO. He hosted the morning show (originally called the "T.N.T. Review") from 1943 until April 28, 1993.

=== Television ===
From 1955 to 1968, he hosted "Salty Brine's Shack" on WPRO-TV/WPRI-TV, a live evening children's program. Its closing words, "Brush your teeth and say your prayers," remained his signature line through the rest of his life.

Brine's distinctive voice, instantly recognizable after first listen, was beloved for his famous catch-phrase, "no school Fostah-Glostah"—a reference to the frequent school closings of the Foster-Glocester school district.

== Awards and honors ==
- 1979: Inducted into the Rhode Island Heritage Hall of Fame.
- April 1988: Named "Man of the Year" by the Rhode Island Advertising Club
- June 23, 1990: the Galilee State Beach was renamed the Salty Brine State Beach.
- October 1997: WPRO's transmitter/studio building on Wampanoag Trail was rededicated as the "Salty Brine Broadcasting Center".
- May 22, 2008: Salty Brine was posthumously inducted into the Rhode Island Radio Hall of Fame.
