= WPAW (Rhode Island) =

Radio station in Pawtucket, Rhode Island (1927–1933)

Pawtucket, Rhode Island; United States
- Broadcast area: Providence metropolitan area
- Frequency: 1210 kHz

Ownership
- Owner: Pawtucket Broadcasting Company

History
- First air date: April 1927
- Last air date: May 1933 (deleted from WPRO-WPAW call sign)
- Former call signs: WFCI (1926–1928); WPAW (1928–1932); WPRO-WPAW (1932–1933)
- Former frequencies: 1330 kHz (1927); 1210 kHz (1928–1933)
- Call sign meaning: Pawtucket, Rhode Island

WPAW (1210 AM) was a radio station in Pawtucket, Rhode Island. The WPAW call sign was deleted in 1933, shortly after the station was consolidated with another nearby station, WPRO.

== History ==
=== WFCI (1926–1928) ===
The station was first licensed, as WFCI, in the summer of 1926 to Frank Cook (Inc.) The call letters were derived from the station owner.

The station moved to 1330 kHz by June 30, 1927, to 1240 that August, and to 1210 kHz in November 1928.

WFCI was on 1330 kHz on or before June 30, 1927, with 50 watts, then moving to 1240 kHz (not yet a Class IV frequency as it would become under NARBA) a year later. WFCI's first studio/office location was at 450 Main Street in Pawtucket.

=== WPAW (1928–1932) ===
In late 1928, the WFCI callsign was changed to WPAW. (In 1941, Frank Cook established a second station with the WFCI callsign, which became WPJB in 1952 and was deleted in 1954.)

=== WPRO-WPAW (1932–1933) ===
In February 1932, Cherry & Webb purchased WPAW, WPRO's timesharing partner on 1210 kHz. Following the WPAW acquisition, the consolidated station operated under the dual call sign of WPRO-WPAW. However, on May 15, 1933, after the Federal Radio Commission requested that stations using only one of their dual call letters drop those that were no longer in regular use, WPAW was eliminated and the station reverted to just WPRO.
