= KSQA =

Television station in Topeka, Kansas

- Topeka, Kansas; United States
- Channels: Digital: 12 (VHF); Virtual: 12

Programming
- Affiliations: 12.1: Independent; for others, see § Subchannels

Ownership
- Owner: KSQA Television Group; (Barbara Wade [51%], Cooper-Fowler Media [49%]); (KSQA, LLC)

History
- First air date: September 29, 2011
- Former channel number: Virtual: 22 (2011–2013)
- Former affiliations: Independent (2011–2012, 2021–2025); TCN (2012–2021); Ion Plus (2025–2026)

Technical information
- Licensing authority: FCC
- Facility ID: 166546
- ERP: 4.2 kW
- HAAT: 65.9 m (216 ft)
- Transmitter coordinates: 39°2′56″N 95°40′33″W

Links
- Public license information: Public file; LMS

KSQA (channel 12) is an independent television station in Topeka, Kansas, United States. The station is owned by the KSQA Television Group, a joint venture between Barbara Wade (who owns a controlling 51% interest) and Cooper-Fowler Media (which owns the remaining 49%). KSQA's studios and transmitter are located on Southwest Jackson Street in downtown Topeka.

== History ==
The station first signed on the air on September 29, 2011, originally maintaining a non-commercial format featuring programming focusing on African American history. It was founded by Barbara Wade, Sheila Robertson and Gregory Talley (the latter of whom serves as the station's operations manager—with the latter two partners under their holding company, Cooper-Fowler Media, each owning 24.5% interests). The decision by the ownership group behind KSQA, LLC to broadcast the station on VHF channel 12 resulted in complaints by CBS affiliate WIBW-TV (channel 13) as after the station signed on, KSQA's over-the-air digital signal began to interfere with WIBW's Cox Communications analog cable slot on the provider's Topeka service area, which broadcast on the same frequency.

Immediately upon its sign-on, KSQA, LLC invoked an option to receive must-carry status to make it mandatorily available on Cox Communications. On June 13, 2012, the Wade/Robertson/Talley ownership group filed a complaint with the Federal Communications Commission (FCC) to invoke a must-carry request for Cox to put the station on channel 12. Although it agreed it must add KSQA to its lineup, the cable provider had chosen to deny the station's channel placement request after the parties could not reach agreement on the ground that KSQA broadcast on virtual channel 22, and therefore was not entitled to be placed on cable channel 12; Cox also informed KSQA, LLC that it preferred not to move WIBW-TV off its existing channel slot to replace it with KSQA, with corporate attorneys overseeing the dispute stating that the station's owners ignored must-carry channel placement regulations and rulings that came about after the digital television transition.

On August 1, 2012, the station became a primary affiliate of country music video service The Country Network. On October 19, 2012, the FCC denied KSQA, LLC's complaint on the same basis that Cox Communications cited in its denial in the channel 12 placement request, stating that the agency's must-carry rules only apply to a station's virtual channel; for this reason, KSQA subsequently filed a request with the FCC to waive its use of channel 22 as its virtual channel and move it to channel 12 to match its physical VHF channel. Cox eventually moved WIBW-TV to channel 13 on March 14, 2013, following the FCC's granting of KSQA's major channel waiver, with KSQA taking over the channel 12 slot; the move effectively alleviated the station's interference issues with WIBW.

== Subchannels ==
The station's signal is multiplexed:

Subchannels of KSQA
Subchannel	Res.	Short name	Programming
12.1	480i	HerFans	Main KSQA programming
12.2	480i	TBA	[Blank]
12.3	480i	TBA	[Blank]
12.4	480i	TBA	[Blank]
12.5	480i	TBA	[Blank]
12.6	480i	GET	Great
