= WPRO (AM) =

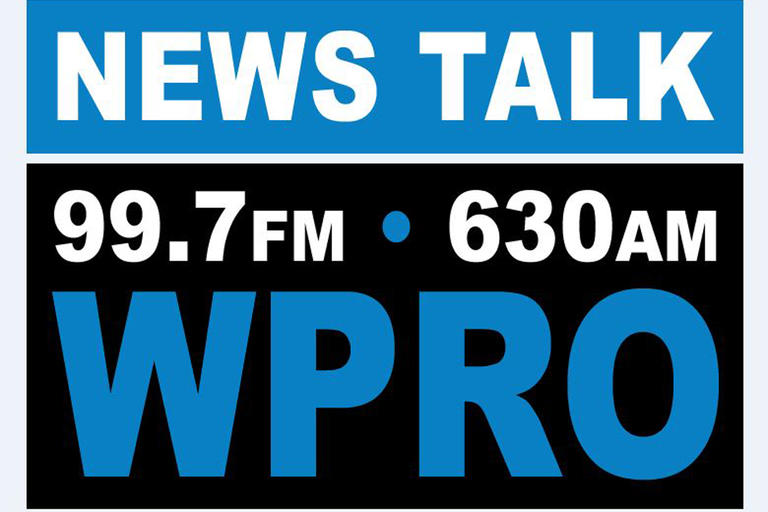
- Providence, Rhode Island; United States
- Broadcast area: Rhode Island
- Frequency: 630 kHz
- Branding: News/Talk 99.7 FM & AM 630 WPRO

Programming
- Format: News/Talk
- Affiliations: ABC News Radio; NBC News Radio; Radio America; Westwood One; New England Patriots Radio Network

Ownership
- Owner: Cumulus Media; (Radio License Holding CBC, LLC)
- Sister stations: WEAN-FM; WPRO-FM; WPRV; WWKX; WWLI

History
- First air date: June 15, 1924
- Former call signs: WKBF (1924–1925); WDWF (1925); WDWF-WLSI (1925–1931); WPRO (1931–1932); WPRO-WPAW (1932–1933)
- Call sign meaning: Providence

Technical information
- Licensing authority: FCC
- Facility ID: 64843
- Class: B
- Power: 5,000 watts
- Transmitter coordinates: 41°46′28.4″N 71°19′21.2″W
- Repeater: 99.7 WEAN-FM (Wakefield-Peacedale)

Links
- Public license information: Public file; LMS
- Webcast: Listen live
- Website: www.997wpro.com

WPRO (630 kHz) is a commercial AM radio station in Providence, Rhode Island. It is owned by Cumulus Media, broadcasting a news/talk radio format, which is simulcast in the Newport area on co-owned WEAN-FM 99.7. The studios for WPRO and other Cumulus Providence stations are on Wampanoag Road in East Providence, at the Salty Brine Broadcast Center, named after WPRO's longtime morning host.

WPRO is powered at 5,000 watts, from a transmitter site co-located with the studios in East Providence. It has a non-directional signal by day. To protect other stations on 630 kHz from interference, at night it uses a two-tower array directional antenna.

WPRO is an affiliate of the New England Patriots Radio Network. It carried Boston Red Sox baseball from 1986 to 2005. In 2006, Red Sox games moved to WEEI-FM.

== History ==
WPRO has an unusual history, as the station has twice been assigned dual call letters, as WDWF-WLSI (1925–1931) and WPRO-WPAW (1932–1933).

=== Early years as WKBF and WDWF ===
The station was first licensed on June 10, 1924, as WKBF, to Dutee W. Flint in Cranston, Rhode Island. It made its formal debut broadcast on June 15, 1924, announcing an initial regular schedule of 7:30 to 8:30 pm. Thursdays; 6:00 to 9:00 pm. Sundays; and, beginning June 23, alternate Mondays from 8:30 to 10:30 pm. The original call sign was randomly assigned from a sequential roster of available call letters. In January 1925, the call sign was changed to WDWF, reflecting the owner's initials.

=== WDWF-WLSI ===
In late 1925, Flint began to share ownership of WDWF with Lincoln Studios. The two owners formed a joint operation, which was assigned the dual callsigns of WDWF-WLSI.

In late 1926, an adverse legal ruling temporarily limited the government's ability to regulate radio stations. This led to the formation of the Federal Radio Commission (FRC), which starting in early 1927 sought to rationalize the broadcasting band, which in turn led to multiple frequency shifts. An initial May 1927 allocation assigned the station to 680 kHz, which was changed to 780 kHz on June 30, and later that year to 800 kHz, 1090 kHz, and 1150 kHz. In early 1928 the station was shifted to 1210 kHz. On November 11, 1928, the FRC made a major reallocation under the provisions of its General Order 40. The station stayed on 1210 kHz, but now had to share this frequency with Frank Cook Inc.'s WFCI (which became WPAW early the next year), located in nearby Pawtucket. By 1930, the studios for WDWF and WLSI were located in Providence.

=== Cherry and Webb era (September 1931–April 1959) ===
The Providence department store Cherry & Webb acquired WDWF-WLSI in September 1931, and changed the stations' callsigns to WPRO. This purchase made Cherry & Webb the third department store in Providence to get into radio broadcasting, after the 1922 launches of Shepard Stores' WEAN and The Outlet Company's WJAR. WPRO formally launched on October 16, with an initial daily schedule of 10:30 a.m to 1 p.m. and 8:30 to 11 pm, plus Sundays from 1:30 to 5:30 pm.

In February 1932, Cherry & Webb purchased WPAW, WPRO's timesharing partner on 1210 kHz in Pawtucket. Following the WPAW acquisition, the consolidated station operated under the dual call sign of WPRO-WPAW. However, on May 15, 1933, after the FRC requested that stations using only one of their dual callsigns drop the one that was no longer in regular use, WPAW was eliminated and the station reverted to just WPRO. WPRO moved to its current frequency, 630 kHz, in 1934. It was an affiliate of the short-lived American Broadcasting System in 1935; in 1937, the station joined the CBS Radio Network, replacing charter affiliate WEAN.

Although WPRO moved from Cranston to Providence soon after Cherry & Webb took over, the station's transmitter site remained in Cranston until its destruction by the 1938 New England hurricane; it then constructed a new transmission facility in East Providence. FM service was added on April 17, 1948, with the debut of WPRO-FM (92.3 MHz), and a television sister station, WPRO-TV (channel 12), went on the air March 27, 1955.

=== CapCities era (April 1959–1993) ===
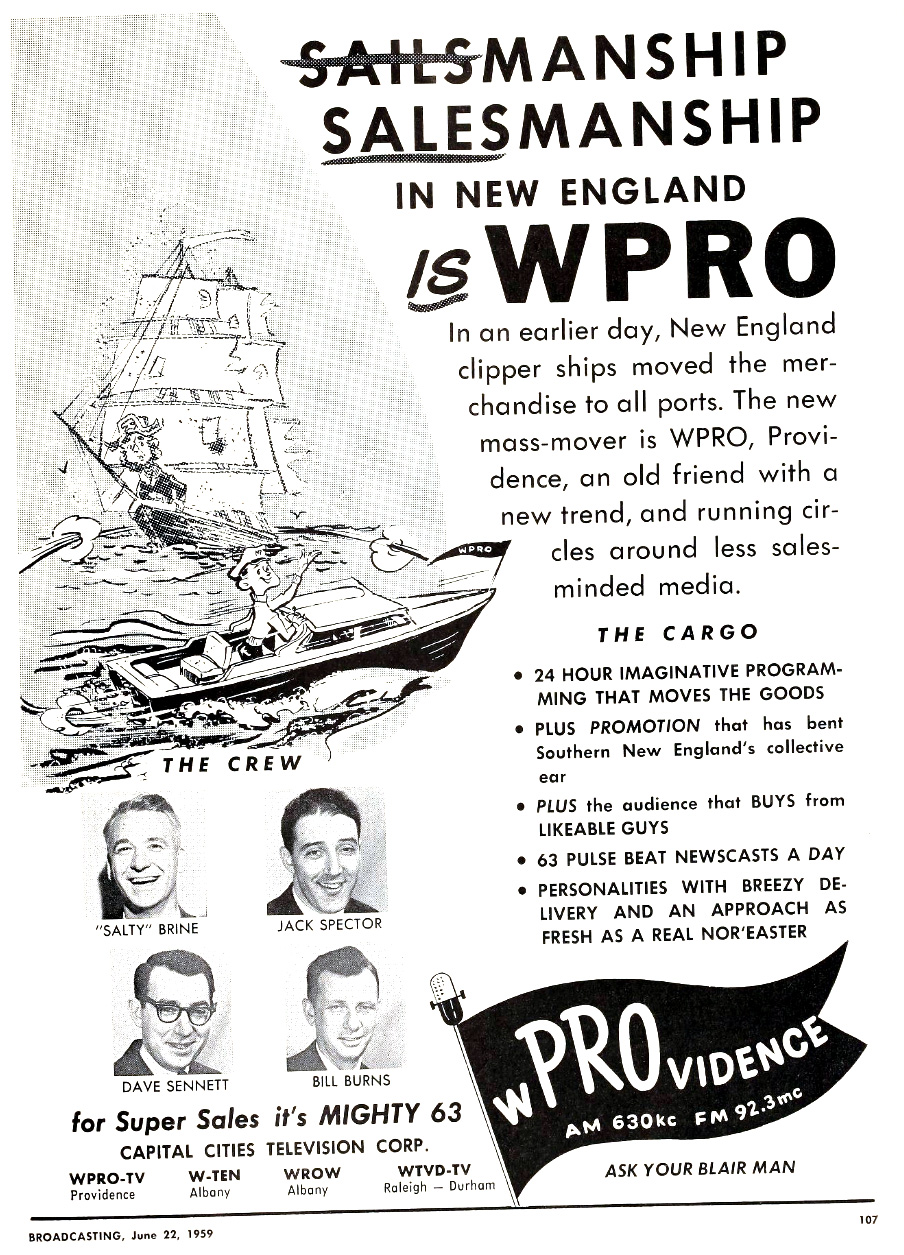
WPRO advertisement (June 1959)

Cherry & Webb exited broadcasting in April 1959, selling WPRO to Capital Cities Television Corporation, which eventually became Capital Cities Communications. Soon afterward, WPRO ended its CBS Radio affiliation and became Providence's top-rated top 40 station, competing against WICE and, later, WGNG. The station's studios were moved to the transmitter location in East Providence in 1974; WPRO's previous studio location, which until then had also continued to house what had become WPRI-TV even after that station was sold by Capital Cities in 1967, was then donated to public television station WSBE-TV. That same year, WPRO-FM adopted its own top 40 format, and the AM side began a gradual evolution to adult contemporary that would continue through the remainder of the decade. During the 1980s, the station again began to shift its format by gradually adding talk shows to its schedule; it also became an affiliate of ABC Radio by 1984, two years before ABC was purchased by Capital Cities. WPRO discontinued its remaining music programming on March 20, 1989, moving to an all-talk format.

=== Tele-Media takes over (1993–present) ===
Capital Cities/ABC sold WPRO to Tele-Media in 1993; this put the station under common ownership with WLKW (the former WEAN) and WWLI. Tele-Media, in turn, sold its stations to Citadel Broadcasting in 1997. WPRO added its simulcast on WEAN-FM on March 11, 2008. Citadel merged with Cumulus Media on September 16, 2011.

== Former on-air staff ==
WPRO's longest-serving on-air staff member was Salty Brine, who served as the station's morning host from 1943 until April 28, 1993. Other former WPRO voices include sportscaster Bryan Fustukian (as Vik Armen). New York media personalities who previously worked at WPRO include WMCA "Good Guy" Jack Spector, CBS staff announcer Hal Simms, and former Providence mayor Buddy Cianci until his death on January 27, 2016.
