= Sleeping Buffalo, Montana =

- Census-designated place
- Location within Montana Location within the United States
- Coordinates: 48°28′59″N 107°31′55″W
- Country: United States
- State: Montana
- County: Phillips

Area
  - Total: 0.19 sq mi (0.49 km^{2})
  - Land: 0.19 sq mi (0.48 km^{2})
  - Water: 0.0039 sq mi (0.01 km^{2})
- Elevation: 2,241 ft (683 m)

Population (2020)
  - Total: 12
  - Density: 64.6/sq mi (24.93/km^{2})
- Time zone: UTC-7 (Mountain (MST))
  - Summer (DST): UTC-6 (MDT)
- ZIP Code: 59261 (Saco)
- Area code: 406
- FIPS code: 30-68985
- GNIS feature ID: 2804316

Sleeping Buffalo is a census-designated place (CDP) in Phillips County, Montana, United States. As of the 2020 census, Sleeping Buffalo had a population of 12. It is in the eastern part of the county on Secondary Highway 243, 1.5 miles (2.4 km) north of the Sleeping Buffalo Rock historic site on U.S. Route 2. Via US-2, it is a further 10 miles (16 km) east to Saco and 18 miles (29 km) southwest to Malta, the Phillips county seat. The Sleeping Buffalo CDP is on high ground between Nelson Reservoir to the north and the valley of Beaver Creek to the south.

The location was first listed as a CDP prior to the 2020 census.

== Demographics ==
Historical population
Census	Pop.	Note	%±
2020	12		—
U.S. Decennial Census

== Media ==
The Phillips County News is a weekly local newspaper. They provide a printed paper as well as news online.
