= Nelson Reservoir =

There are two lakes named Nelson Reservoir in the United States:

- Nelson Reservoir (Montana)
- Nelson Reservoir (Arizona)
