= Hewitt Lake =

Hewitt Lake may refer to:

== Places ==
- Hewitt Lake (Black River-Matheson), a lake in Black River-Matheson, Ontario
- Hewitt Lake (Michaud Township, Cochrane District), a lake in Cochrane District, Ontario
- Hewitt Lake (Kenora District), a lake in Kenora District, Ontario
- Hewitt Lake National Wildlife Refuge, a protected area in Montana
- Hewitt Lake (Arkansas), see List of lakes in Logan County, Arkansas
- Hewitt Lake (Montana), see List of lakes in Phillips County, Montana
- Hewitt Lake (Washington), a lake in Washington

== Other uses ==
- Hewitt Lake (microarchitecture), a code name for a processor microarchitecture developed by Intel used by Xeon D SoC
