= List of lakes of Phillips County, Montana =

There are at least 147 named lakes and reservoirs in Phillips County, Montana.

== Lakes ==
- Austin Lake, 48°42′37″N 107°38′59″W, el. 2,441 feet (744 m)
- Beam Lake, 47°52′06″N 108°05′49″W, el. 2,782 feet (848 m)
- Bennett Lake, 48°12′56″N 107°47′40″W, el. 2,589 feet (789 m)
- Buckley Lake, 47°56′34″N 107°32′47″W, el. 2,520 feet (770 m)
- Carter Lake, 48°36′02″N 107°27′27″W, el. 2,411 feet (735 m)
- Drumbo Unit, 48°22′27″N 107°40′19″W, el. 2,208 feet (673 m)
- Dry Lake, 47°34′02″N 107°51′42″W, el. 2,356 feet (718 m)
- Dry Lake, 47°45′57″N 107°51′27″W, el. 2,549 feet (777 m)
- Dry Lake Unit, 48°24′15″N 107°36′25″W, el. 2,208 feet (673 m)
- Erphit Lake, 48°28′50″N 107°39′45″W, el. 2,254 feet (687 m)
- Ester Lake, 48°05′52″N 108°15′29″W, el. 2,634 feet (803 m)
- Horse Shoe Lake, 48°50′09″N 108°00′43″W, el. 2,694 feet (821 m)
- Horseshoe Lake, 48°50′07″N 108°00′38″W, el. 2,694 feet (821 m)
- Indian Lake, 47°44′25″N 107°51′31″W, el. 2,566 feet (782 m)
- Lake Bowdoin, 48°24′46″N 107°41′00″W, el. 2,208 feet (673 m)
- Lakeside Unit, 48°25′47″N 107°38′43″W, el. 2,221 feet (677 m)
- Lone Tree Lake (historical), 48°29′26″N 107°38′14″W, el. 2,224 feet (678 m)
- McNeil Slough, 48°31′56″N 107°33′04″W, el. 2,195 feet (669 m)
- Mud Lake, 48°26′44″N 107°38′15″W, el. 2,244 feet (684 m)
- Mud Lake (historical), 48°28′58″N 107°34′29″W, el. 2,224 feet (678 m)
- Parrot Lake, 48°00′40″N 108°15′01″W, el. 2,776 feet (846 m)
- Pea Lake, 48°55′16″N 107°36′55″W, el. 2,454 feet (748 m)
- Shed Lake, 47°52′21″N 108°06′53″W, el. 2,789 feet (850 m)
- Solberg Slough, 48°13′18″N 107°49′08″W, el. 2,589 feet (789 m)
- The Plunge, 47°50′34″N 108°35′58″W, el. 3,383 feet (1,031 m)
- Whitcomb Lake, 47°59′30″N 107°50′02″W, el. 2,490 feet (760 m)

== Reservoirs ==
- 3 Way Number 2 Reservoir, 48°56′08″N 107°40′42″W, el. 2,677 feet (816 m)
- Ada Reservoir, 48°53′14″N 107°40′09″W, el. 2,562 feet (781 m)
- Adair Reservoir, 48°38′21″N 107°39′44″W, el. 2,461 feet (750 m)
- Archie Reservoir, 47°45′48″N 107°59′04″W, el. 2,634 feet (803 m)
- Artie Reservoir, 48°58′20″N 107°35′42″W, el. 2,644 feet (806 m)
- Ashfield Reservoir, 48°25′54″N 107°29′03″W, el. 2,333 feet (711 m)
- Badger Reservoir, 47°42′30″N 108°12′40″W, el. 2,815 feet (858 m)
- Bass Reservoir, 48°03′02″N 108°01′14″W, el. 2,602 feet (793 m)
- Bauer Reservoir, 48°21′31″N 107°30′51″W, el. 2,392 feet (729 m)
- Bell Reservoir, 47°41′32″N 108°38′44″W, el. 2,894 feet (882 m)
- Big McNeil Slough, 48°32′21″N 107°31′49″W, el. 2,178 feet (664 m)
- Big Reservoir, 48°48′15″N 107°24′09″W, el. 2,851 feet (869 m)
- Big Rock Reservoir, 47°37′04″N 108°10′33″W, el. 2,703 feet (824 m)
- Big Sage Reservoir, 47°45′55″N 108°26′52″W, el. 3,031 feet (924 m)
- Big Snowy Reservoir, 47°39′32″N 108°20′17″W, el. 2,838 feet (865 m)
- Bison Bone Reservoir, 47°48′03″N 108°16′48″W, el. 2,848 feet (868 m)
- Black Coulee Pond, 48°23′08″N 107°43′43″W, el. 2,221 feet (677 m)
- Black Cow Reservoir, 48°05′09″N 107°37′41″W, el. 2,402 feet (732 m)
- Blizzard Reservoir, 47°44′02″N 108°20′05″W, el. 2,956 feet (901 m)
- Blue Stem Reservoir, 48°44′10″N 108°08′42″W, el. 2,723 feet (830 m)
- Bog Reservoir, 47°46′49″N 108°08′37″W, el. 2,825 feet (861 m)
- Buckskin Reservoir, 47°38′40″N 108°08′05″W, el. 2,762 feet (842 m)
- Carberry Reservoir, 47°45′40″N 107°57′05″W, el. 2,651 feet (808 m)
- Carter Reservoir, 47°50′01″N 107°52′40″W, el. 2,503 feet (763 m)
- Charley Reservoir, 48°51′57″N 107°26′46″W, el. 2,825 feet (861 m)
- Cole Ponds, 48°32′28″N 107°28′00″W, el. 2,198 feet (670 m)
- Converse Reservoir, 48°17′27″N 107°24′55″W, el. 2,684 feet (818 m)
- Dan Reservoir, 47°41′32″N 108°12′26″W, el. 2,789 feet (850 m)
- Dead Cedar Reservoir, 47°47′31″N 108°51′00″W, el. 3,058 feet (932 m)
- Deep Reservoir, 47°43′35″N 108°28′52″W, el. 3,025 feet (922 m)
- Detail Reservoir, 47°44′14″N 108°26′39″W, el. 2,949 feet (899 m)
- Dione Reservoir, 47°47′34″N 107°58′01″W, el. 2,615 feet (797 m)
- Drabbels Reservoir, 48°17′34″N 107°46′10″W, el. 2,510 feet (770 m)
- Dry Lake Reservoir, 47°39′41″N 108°11′14″W, el. 2,828 feet (862 m)
- Dusky Reservoir, 47°49′38″N 108°12′50″W, el. 2,904 feet (885 m)
- Ethel Reservoir, 48°57′30″N 107°36′33″W, el. 2,533 feet (772 m)
- Eva May Reservoir, 47°36′34″N 107°47′21″W, el. 2,516 feet (767 m)
- Express Reservoir, 47°46′07″N 108°09′09″W, el. 2,821 feet (860 m)
- Farm Pond, 48°25′04″N 107°39′34″W, el. 2,215 feet (675 m)
- First Creek Reservoir, 47°52′35″N 107°46′35″W, el. 2,379 feet (725 m)
- First Creek Reservoir, 45°52′42″N 109°46′51″W, el. 4,367 feet (1,331 m)
- Fish Fossil Reservoir, 47°38′41″N 107°55′27″W, el. 2,625 feet (800 m)
- Fjeldheim Reservoir, 48°46′25″N 107°23′49″W, el. 2,762 feet (842 m)
- Fort Peck Lake, 48°00′10″N 106°24′58″W, el. 2,313 feet (705 m)
- Fowler Reservoir, 47°40′03″N 107°47′53″W, el. 2,395 feet (730 m)
- Frenchman Reservoir, 48°41′40″N 107°14′19″W, el. 2,264 feet (690 m)
- Goose Island Pond, 48°21′57″N 107°40′59″W, el. 2,211 feet (674 m)
- Government Field Reservoir, 48°04′58″N 108°22′51″W, el. 2,815 feet (858 m)
- Grag Reservoir, 48°54′32″N 107°29′33″W, el. 2,707 feet (825 m)
- Gullwing Reservoir, 47°43′14″N 108°27′38″W, el. 2,943 feet (897 m)
- Happy Gang Reservoir, 47°48′06″N 108°14′08″W, el. 2,884 feet (879 m)
- Hewitt Lake, 48°32′22″N 107°34′58″W, el. 2,198 feet (670 m)
- Hilo Reservoir, 48°58′56″N 107°40′47″W, el. 2,631 feet (802 m)
- Holzhey Reservoir, 47°54′21″N 108°04′37″W, el. 2,753 feet (839 m)
- Holzhey Reservoir, 47°54′12″N 108°04′32″W, el. 2,762 feet (842 m)
- Hoverson Reservoir, 47°47′26″N 108°10′25″W, el. 2,900 feet (880 m)
- J D Reservoir, 47°47′54″N 108°33′50″W, el. 3,077 feet (938 m)
- Jones Reservoir, 47°41′13″N 107°46′09″W, el. 2,310 feet (700 m)
- King Reservoir, 47°50′46″N 107°51′21″W, el. 2,539 feet (774 m)
- Kohola Reservoir, 48°59′32″N 107°37′37″W, el. 2,602 feet (793 m)
- Lake PR-19, 47°58′23″N 107°31′09″W, el. 2,513 feet (766 m)
- Lake Reservoir, 47°43′12″N 108°11′44″W, el. 2,756 feet (840 m)
- LeNoir Reservoir, 48°20′08″N 107°37′19″W, el. 2,228 feet (679 m)
- Lester Reservoir, 48°58′49″N 107°30′44″W, el. 2,628 feet (801 m)
- Little Warm Reservoir, 48°04′09″N 108°08′48″W, el. 2,575 feet (785 m)
- Louie Reservoir, 48°51′35″N 107°26′52″W, el. 2,805 feet (855 m)
- Manning Corral Reservoir, 47°40′51″N 108°26′55″W, el. 2,969 feet (905 m)
- Martin Lake, 48°47′31″N 107°54′43″W, el. 2,651 feet (808 m)
- Martin Retaining Pit, 47°39′48″N 107°46′51″W, el. 2,388 feet (728 m)
- Mary Reservoir, 47°37′18″N 107°46′40″W, el. 2,526 feet (770 m)
- McChesney Reservoir, 48°32′00″N 107°14′40″W, el. 2,182 feet (665 m)
- McChesney Reservoir, 47°45′52″N 108°30′10″W, el. 3,123 feet (952 m)
- McNeil Reservoir, 47°46′18″N 107°50′28″W, el. 2,510 feet (770 m)
- Monster Reservoir, 47°43′44″N 108°13′56″W, el. 2,776 feet (846 m)
- Morgan Reservoir, 48°51′51″N 107°13′34″W, el. 2,415 feet (736 m)
- Nelson Reservoir, 48°29′43″N 107°33′01″W, el. 2,224 feet (678 m)
- Nelson Reservoir, 48°03′23″N 107°52′30″W, el. 2,415 feet (736 m)
- Nerve Reservoir, 48°53′33″N 107°34′01″W, el. 2,562 feet (781 m)
- Number Twenty Reservoir, 47°47′20″N 107°47′53″W, el. 2,395 feet (730 m)
- Palea Reservoir, 48°59′06″N 107°39′05″W, el. 2,549 feet (777 m)
- Paleface Reservoir, 47°44′16″N 108°24′19″W, el. 2,943 feet (897 m)
- Partnership Reservoir, 48°10′05″N 108°01′23″W, el. 2,500 feet (760 m)
- Patrol Road Pond, 48°22′53″N 107°43′16″W, el. 2,221 feet (677 m)
- Pearl Reservoir, 47°46′18″N 108°34′13″W, el. 3,061 feet (933 m)
- Pep Reservoir, 47°45′20″N 108°16′28″W, el. 2,874 feet (876 m)
- Phillips Reservoir, 47°49′35″N 108°38′03″W, el. 3,294 feet (1,004 m)
- Plum Reservoir, 48°38′05″N 107°40′19″W, el. 2,346 feet (715 m)
- Point of Rocks Reservoir, 48°21′24″N 108°11′28″W, el. 2,280 feet (690 m)
- PR 40 Reservoir, 48°26′12″N 107°26′29″W, el. 2,497 feet (761 m)
- Private Reservoir, 47°45′56″N 108°17′20″W, el. 2,884 feet (879 m)
- Puckett Reservoir, 48°00′22″N 107°50′05″W, el. 2,543 feet (775 m)
- Rock Creek Reservoir, 47°36′47″N 108°28′28″W, el. 2,300 feet (700 m)
- Sagebrush Reservoir, 47°42′23″N 108°25′17″W, el. 2,864 feet (873 m)
- Salene Reservoir, 47°50′04″N 107°48′46″W, el. 2,523 feet (769 m)
- Salsbery Reservoir, 48°50′48″N 107°27′02″W, el. 2,815 feet (858 m)
- Sarm Reservoir, 48°53′48″N 107°31′48″W, el. 2,641 feet (805 m)
- Schmittou Reservoir, 48°50′56″N 107°28′57″W, el. 2,759 feet (841 m)
- Seven-Up Reservoir, 47°45′05″N 108°28′37″W, el. 3,041 feet (927 m)
- Seymour Reservoir, 48°05′09″N 108°00′52″W, el. 2,562 feet (781 m)
- Shale Reservoir, 47°40′37″N 107°59′45″W, el. 2,687 feet (819 m)
- Siwash Reservoir, 47°44′51″N 107°56′01″W, el. 2,654 feet (809 m)
- Skull Reservoir, 47°51′00″N 107°49′51″W, el. 2,556 feet (779 m)
- Sorrell Reservoir, 47°45′47″N 108°10′53″W, el. 2,785 feet (849 m)
- Starter Pond, 48°23′11″N 107°43′19″W, el. 2,218 feet (676 m)
- Stratton Reservoir, 47°48′50″N 107°46′46″W, el. 2,362 feet (720 m)
- Taint Reservoir, 47°42′21″N 108°23′49″W, el. 2,861 feet (872 m)
- Timber Pit Reservoir, 47°36′34″N 108°13′05″W, el. 2,726 feet (831 m)
- Titan Reservoir, 48°59′54″N 107°40′31″W, el. 2,582 feet (787 m)
- Tondra Reservoir, 48°57′20″N 107°40′17″W, el. 2,654 feet (809 m)
- Twin Snag Reservoir, 47°46′01″N 108°50′26″W, el. 3,087 feet (941 m)
- Veseth Reservoir, 47°55′05″N 108°10′15″W, el. 2,703 feet (824 m)
- Waterfowl Reservoir, 48°57′51″N 107°41′02″W, el. 2,657 feet (810 m)
- Waydown Reservoir, 47°47′44″N 108°34′57″W, el. 3,166 feet (965 m)
- Weigand Reservoir, 48°15′37″N 108°24′57″W, el. 2,543 feet (775 m)
- West Alkali Reservoir, 48°12′05″N 108°04′35″W, el. 2,510 feet (770 m)
- Whiteface Reservoir, 47°42′41″N 108°25′55″W, el. 2,897 feet (883 m)
- Wild Horse Reservoir, 48°07′49″N 108°10′51″W, el. 2,523 feet (769 m)
- Wildlife Reservoir, 47°38′40″N 108°10′53″W, el. 2,762 feet (842 m)
- Williams Coulee Reservoir, 48°11′44″N 108°01′00″W, el. 2,454 feet (748 m)
- Wilson Reservoir, 47°49′40″N 107°50′12″W, el. 2,425 feet (739 m)
- Wrangler Reservoir, 47°46′32″N 108°12′09″W, el. 2,821 feet (860 m)

== See also ==
- List of lakes in Montana
