= Martin Fire =

Nevada wildfire

- Part of the 2018 Nevada wildfires
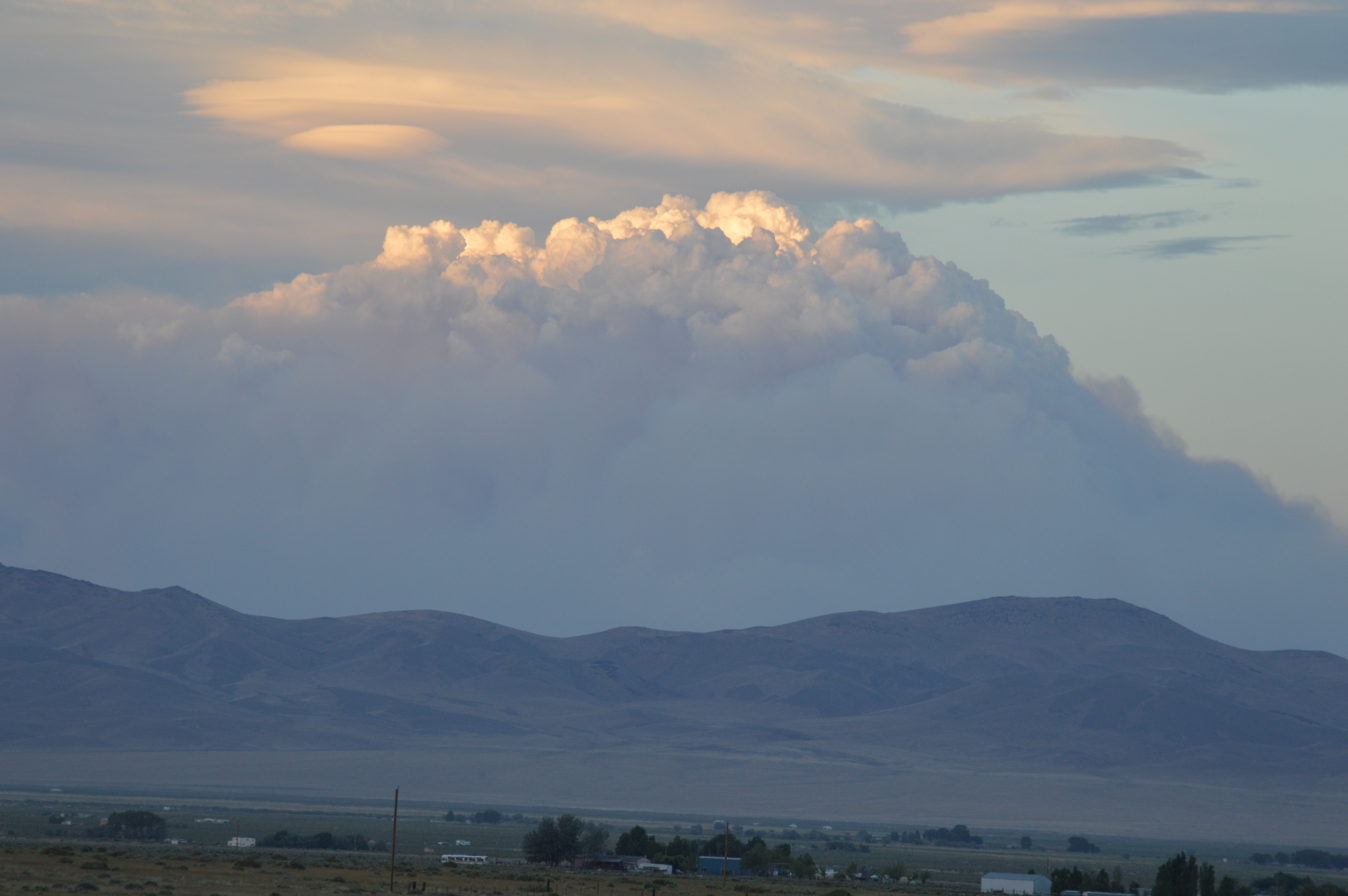
- Smoke from the Martin Fire on July 7.
- Location: Nevada, United States of America

Statistics
- Burned area: 439,230 acres (177,750 ha)

Ignition
- Cause: Caused by a human, specifics unknown. Spread by dry, hot, and windy conditions.

Martin Fire was a wildfire in northern Nevada, United States, that started on Monday, July 5, 2018. The fire burned a total area of 439,230 acres. It was the largest fire in Nevada's history, and one of the biggest in the U.S. The blaze destroyed six ranches, grazing land, and animal habitats.

== Origin ==
The fire erupted seven miles north of Paradise Valley in Humboldt County and burnt eastward into Elko County. The origin of the fire was thought to be human-based. Dry, hot, and windy conditions combined with high fuel load caused the extension of fire.

== Description ==
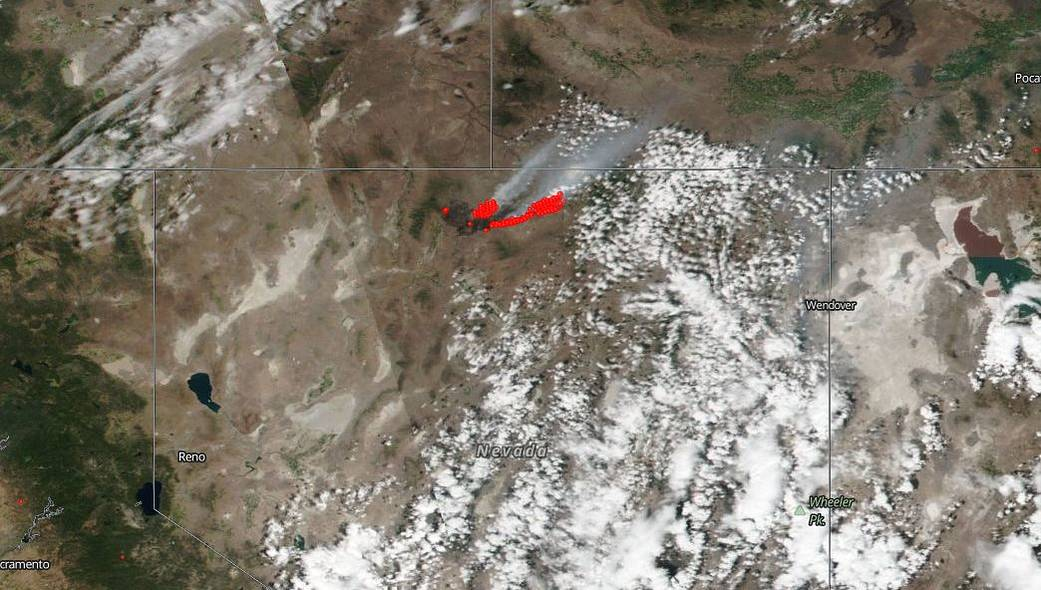
NASA's Suomi NPP satellite captured this image of the fire and smoke blowing from it on July 08, 2018 with the Visible Infrared Imaging Radiometer Suite (VIIRS) instrument. Actively burning areas (hot spots), detected by thermal bands, are outlined in red.

The fire was reported around 12:25 a.m. on July 5, and by 5:00 p.m, the fire had spread over 22,000 acres. On July 8, the fire was only 8% percent contained, and 330,000 acres were burnt. 35% containment of the fire was observed on July 9, and about 425,000 acres were burnt. By the end of it, 439,230 acres were damaged. Due to the size and complexity of the fire, both government agencies and private contractors were deployed to gain control of the fire. By July 12, there were approximately 572 firefighters to fight the 680 mile long blaze.

The Bureau of Land Management (BLM) had also announced a reward of $28,000 for anyone who would give information about who started the fire. By July 21, the fire was fully contained.

=== Use of UAS ===
As per the 'Call When Needed' contract with the U.S. Department of Interior, a team of pilots and four unmanned aircraft systems (UAS) were deployed by Bridger Aerospace, a private contractor, on 11 July. The UAS were used to map 425,000 acres of the wildfire to gather data on the magnitude of damage and locate hot spots using an infrared sensor.

== Consequences ==
The fire destroyed grazing areas and a small building. It destroyed the ecosystem for the sage grouse and the mule deer habitat. Several springs and streams were also affected.

== Closures ==
On July 10, the Wilson reservoir and campground (HWY 226) was closed for public safety due to fire suppression activities. It was reopened on July 13.
