= Loring Colony, Montana =

- Census-designated place
- Location within Montana Location within the United States
- Coordinates: 48°47′21″N 107°58′07″W
- Country: United States
- State: Montana
- County: Phillips

Area
  - Total: 0.37 sq mi (0.96 km^{2})
  - Land: 0.37 sq mi (0.96 km^{2})
  - Water: 0 sq mi (0.00 km^{2})
- Elevation: 2,841 ft (866 m)

Population (2020)
  - Total: 48
  - Density: 129.3/sq mi (49.94/km^{2})
- Time zone: UTC-7 (Mountain (MST))
  - Summer (DST): UTC-6 (MDT)
- ZIP Code: 59537 (Loring)
- Area code: 406
- FIPS code: 30-45179
- GNIS feature ID: 2804315

Loring Colony is a Hutterite community and census-designated place (CDP) in Phillips County, Montana, United States. It is in the northwest part of the county, 7 miles (11 km) west of U.S. Route 191, less than one mile south of US-191 passes through the small unincorporated community of Loring. Via US-191, Loring Colony is 44 miles (71 km) north of Malta, the Phillips county seat.

As of the 2020 census, Loring Colony had a population of 48.

The community was first listed as a CDP prior to the 2020 census.

== Demographics ==
Historical population
Census	Pop.	Note	%±
2020	48		—
U.S. Decennial Census
