= Wayne Stahl =

American politician

Member of the Montana House of Representatives from the 35th district
- In office 2005 to 2012

Personal details
- Party: Republican

Wayne Stahl is a Republican member of the Montana Legislature. He was elected to House District 35 which represents the Saco, Montana area.
