= Loring, Montana =

Unincorporated community in Montana, United States

- Unincorporated community
- Location within Montana Location within the United States
- Coordinates: 48°47′32″N 107°51′42″W
- Country: United States
- State: Montana
- County: Phillips
- Elevation: 2,707 ft (825 m)
- Time zone: UTC-7 (Mountain (MST))
  - Summer (DST): UTC-6 (MDT)
- ZIP code: 59537
- Area code: 406
- GNIS feature ID: 773676

Loring is an unincorporated community in Phillips County, Montana, United States. Loring is located on U.S. Route 191, 38 miles (61 km) north of Malta and 15 miles south of the Canadian border. Loring has a post office serving ZIP code 59537.

Loring began as a stop on the Great Northern Railway’s branch line between Saco and Hogeland. The post office opened in 1929.

== Climate ==
According to the Köppen Climate Classification system, Loring has a semi-arid climate, abbreviated "BSk" on climate maps.
