= Wagner, Montana =

Unincorporated community in Montana, United States

Coordinates: 48°22′14″N 108°04′39″W

Wagner is an unincorporated area and village in Phillips County, Montana, United States. The town lies along the Hi-Line of the Great Northern Railway.

Wagner Montana is most famous for the 1901 Butch Cassidy and the Sundance Kid train robbery of $40,000.

== Transportation ==
Amtrak’s Empire Builder, which operates between Seattle/Portland and Chicago, passes through the small town on BNSF tracks, but makes no stop. The nearest station is located in Malta, 11 miles (18 km) to the east.
