= Sleeping Buffalo Rock =

- U.S. National Register of Historic Places
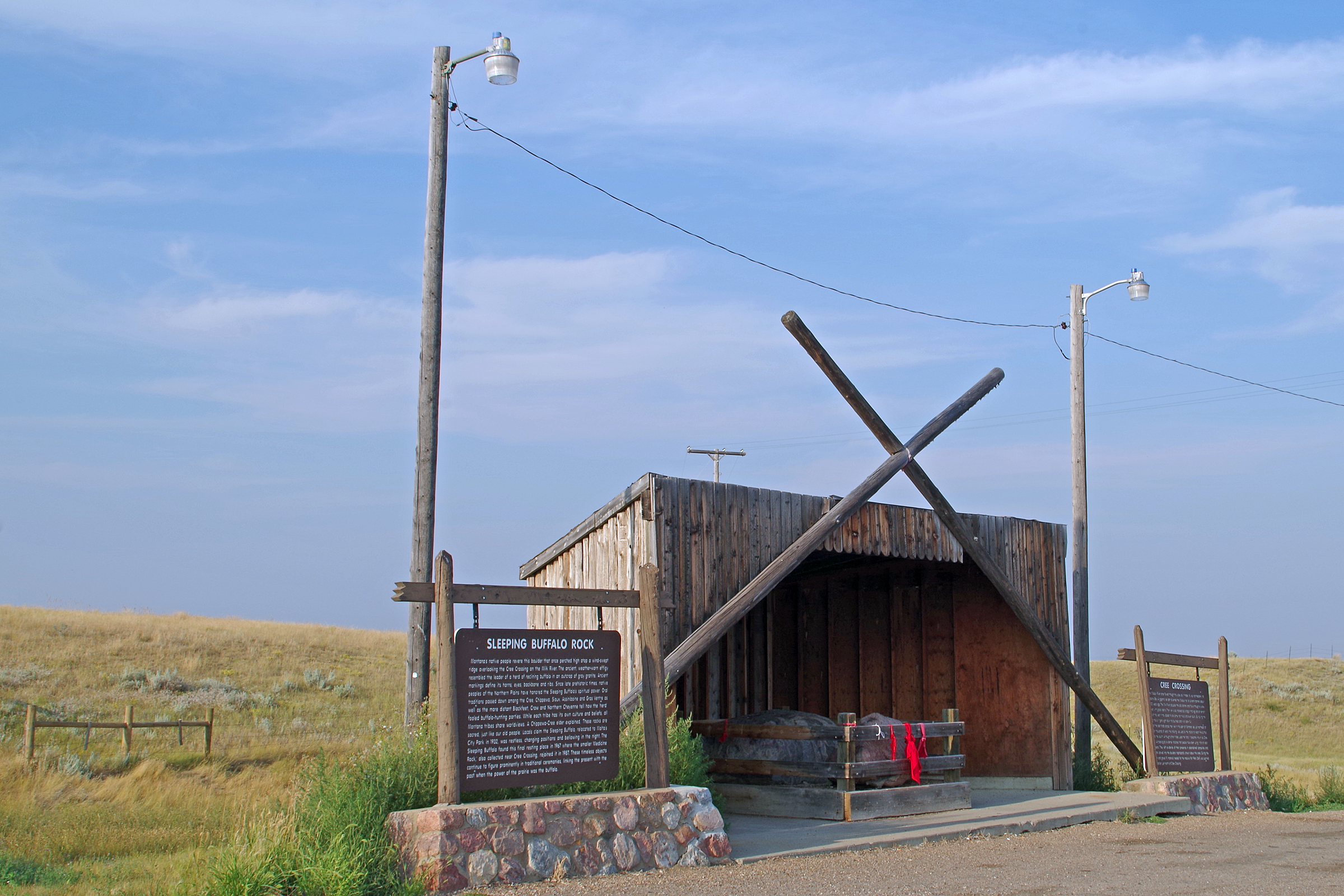

- Location within Montana Location within the United States
- Location: Junction of U.S. Route 2 and Montana Highway 243, Saco, Montana
- Coordinates: 48°28′10″N 107°32′56″W
- Area: less than one acre
- NRHP reference No.: 96000548
- Added to NRHP: May 17, 1996

Sleeping Buffalo Rock is a site on the National Register of Historic Places located near Saco, Montana. It was added to the Register in 1996.

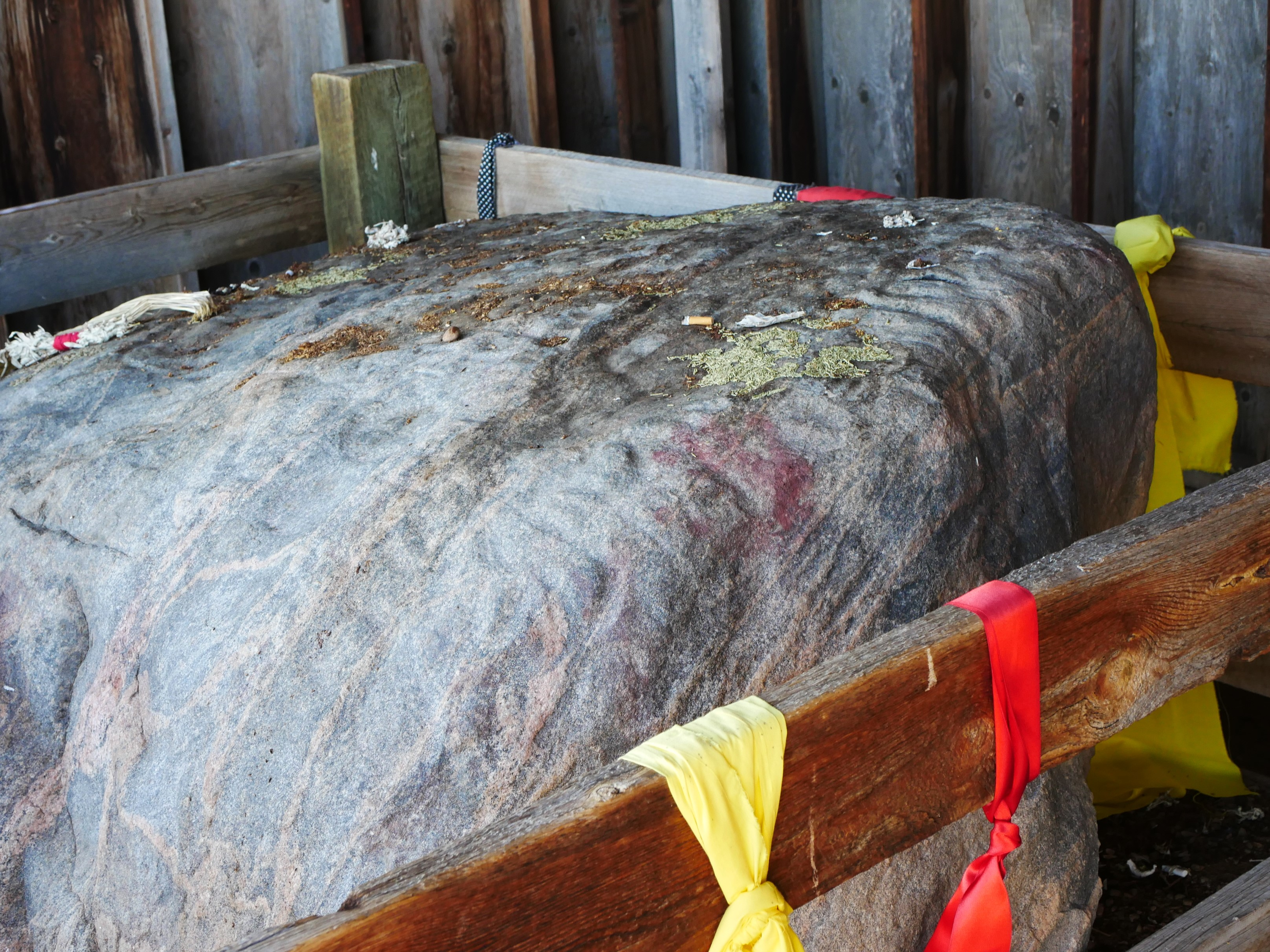
The larger Medicine Rock at Sleeping Buffalo Rock, somewhat preserved by a roof and a railing but right next to a highway and unguarded, unwatched and uncared for

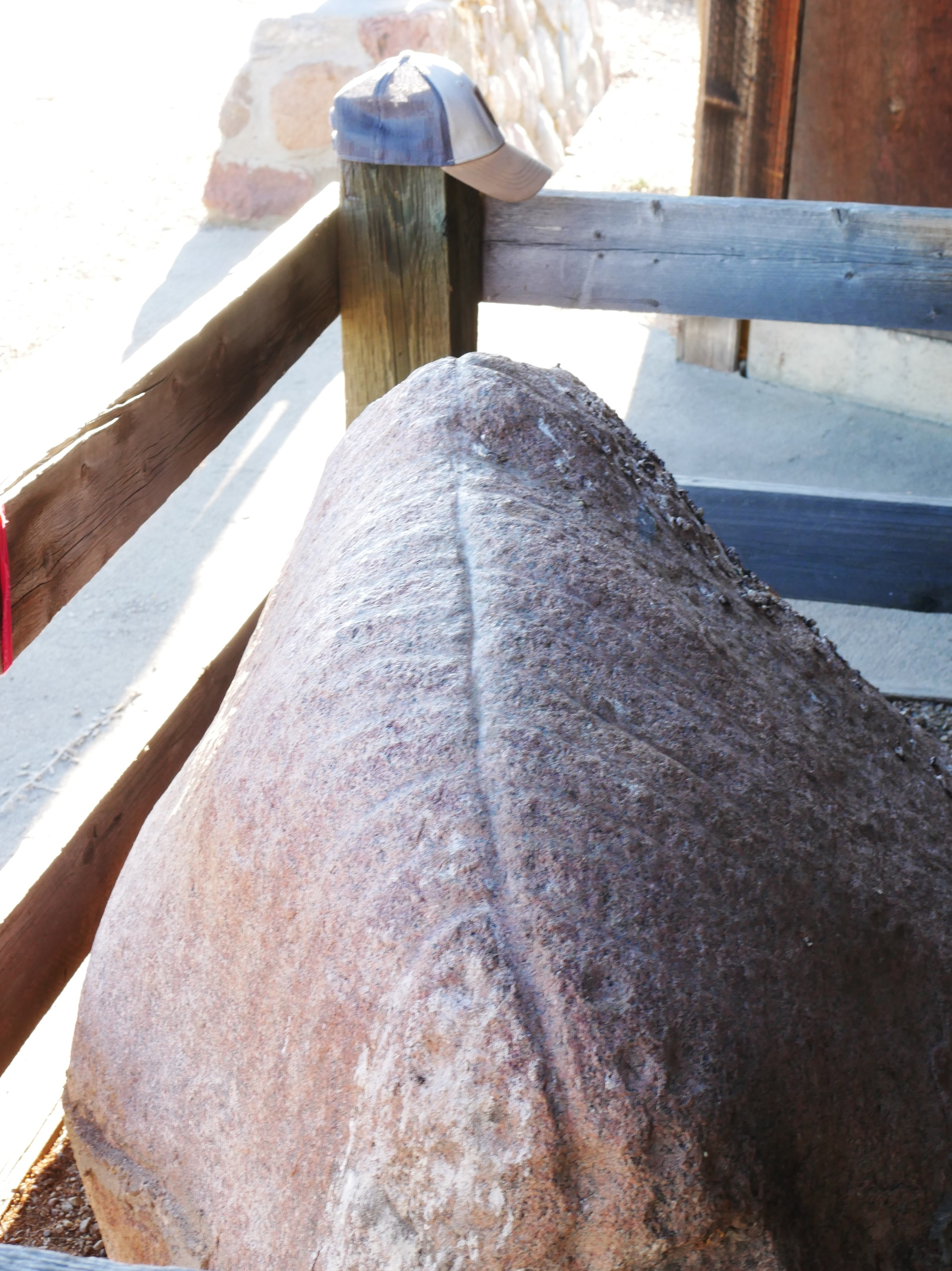
Backbone of Sleeping Buffalo Rock

These large rocks were landmarks known to all the native tribes in this area and considered sacred. They were once the largest rocks on the landscape and ground down and transported by glaciers to where they stood on a ridge but as part of a group like buffalo are, and in prehistoric times were covered with petroglyphs by Native Americans. The smaller of the two rocks was carved to look like a buffalo and is called "Buffalo Rock", while the larger one is carved with a variety of symbols and designs and is called "Medicine Rock". When indigenous people visited where these rocks used to stand at a crossing on the Milk River they would leave offerings and pray for guidance, safe travel, courage and strength, a practice that is still carried on to this day although the rocks have been moved several times to their current location next to a modern highway. Typical prayer offerings include cloth, tobacco, bundles of sage, juniper leaves, and braided sweetgrass to invoke the aid of the Great Spirit.

The placard reads:

A nearby wind-swept ridge overlooking the Cree Crossing on the Milk River was the original resting place of this ancient weather-worn effigy. There the boulder sat as the leader of a herd of reclining buffalo envisioned in an outcrop of granite. Incised markings made in the distant past define its horns, eyes, backbone, and ribs. Since late prehistoric times, native peoples of the Northern Plains have revered the Sleeping Buffalo's spiritual power. Oral traditions reveal that it was well known to the Cree, Chippewa, Sioux, Assiniboine, and Gros Ventre as well as the more distant Blackfeet, Crow, and Northern Cheyenne. Stories passed from generation to generation tell how the "herd" fooled more than one buffalo-hunting party. While each tribe has its own culture and beliefs, native peoples share a worldview intertwining the sacred and secular. A Chippewa-Cree elder explained, "These rocks are sacred, just like our old people." In 1932, the Sleeping Buffalo was separated from its ridgetop companions. Relocated to the City Park in Malta, the Sleeping Buffalo was said to have been restless; stories are told of its changing position and nighttime bellowing. Moved to this site in 1967 from old Highway 2, the Sleeping Buffalo was later rejoined by the larger "Medicine Rock" in 1987, also collected near Cree Crossing. These timeless objects continue to figure prominently in traditional ceremonies. They provide a link to ancestral peoples of the high plains and the long ago time when, as one elder put it, "The power of the prairie was the buffalo."

Many native people were against the rocks being moved to the town of Malta saying they were restless there, and then were against them being moved to their current location next to the side of the Highway 2, but drilling for oil in the 1920's hit hot water and they have tried to develop the remote area near Saco as a tourist destination- the highway department placed Sleeping Buffalo rock there in 1967, but Medicine Rock was left at another location along Highway 2- unprotected- until 1987 when the owners of the Hot Springs petitioned the highway department and offered to shelter the rock. Though they are under a wooden shelter, these sacred rocks are still exposed to vandalism and littering, as well as exposure to the elements and animals.

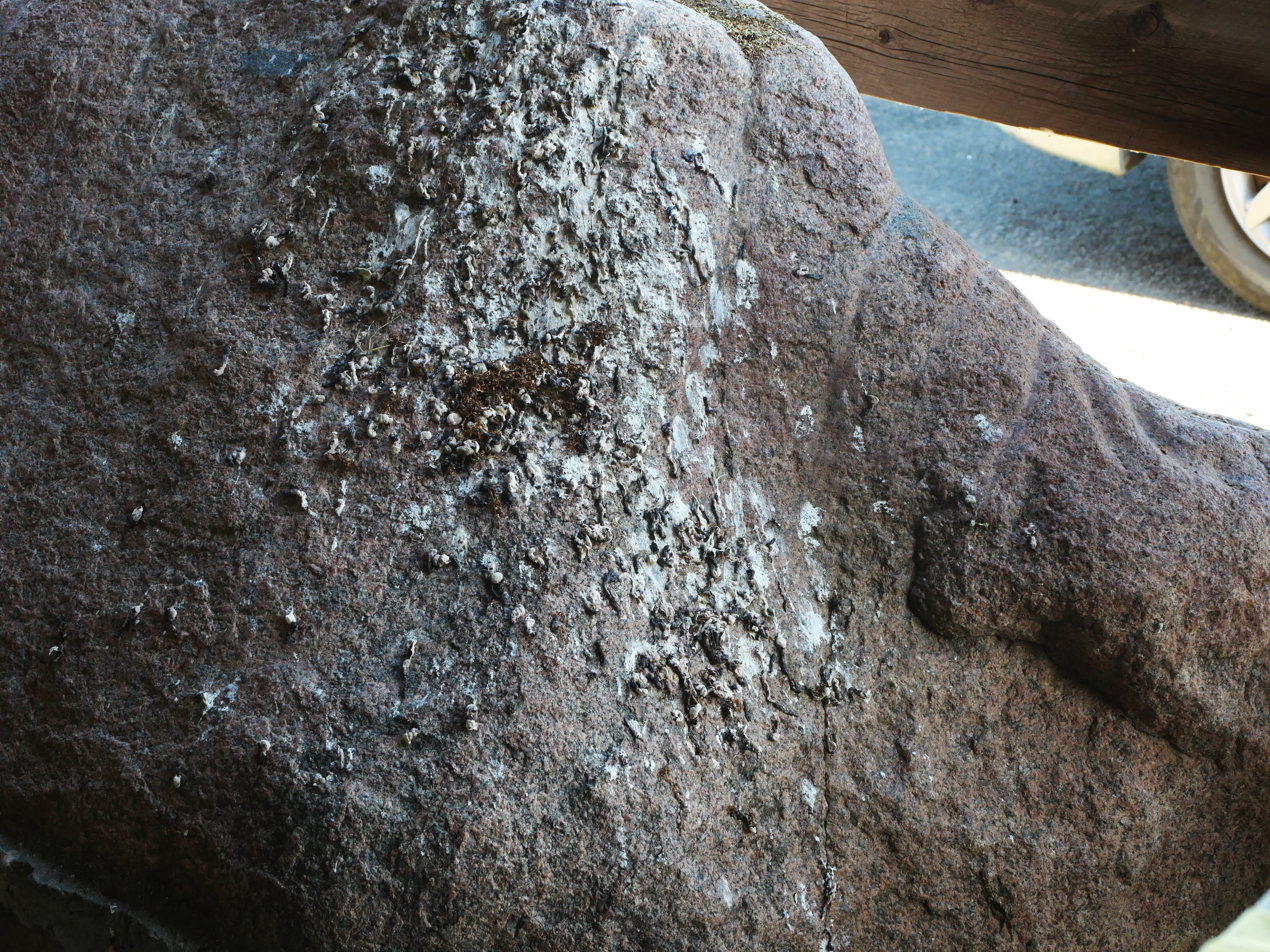
Bird droppings on Sleeping Buffalo Rock

== Popular culture ==
The monument provides the setting in "Sleeping Buffalo", a song by Canadian folk musician Garnet Rogers.
