= Perry Fire =

2018 wildfire in Nevada, United States

- Part of the 2018 Nevada wildfires
- Date: July 29, 2018 – August 5, 2018
- Location: Reno, Nevada
- Coordinates: 39°31′38″N 119°49′19″W

Statistics
- Burned area: 51,400 acres (208 km^{2})

Impacts
- Deaths: 0
- Injuries: 0

Ignition
- Cause: Unknown

Map
- The fires location in southwestern Nevada

The Perry Fire was a wildfire that burned near Reno, Nevada. As of August 6, 2018, the fire had burned a total of 51,400 acres and was 100% contained.

On August 5, 2018 the fire was 100% contained.

== Closures ==
Highway 446 was closed in the area.

== Evacuations ==
The Grass Valley Road Area was under evacuations.

An evacuation center was open at Ironwood Event Center.
