= Drones in wildfire management =

Use of unmanned aircraft systems in wildfire detection, monitoring, and suppression

Drones in wildfire management refers to the use of unmanned aircraft systems (UAS), also known as unmanned aerial vehicles (UAVs), in the detection, mapping, monitoring and management of wildfires. They are used for real-time reconnaissance, thermal hotspot detection, fire-perimeter mapping, prescribed burning support, communications support and post-fire assessment.

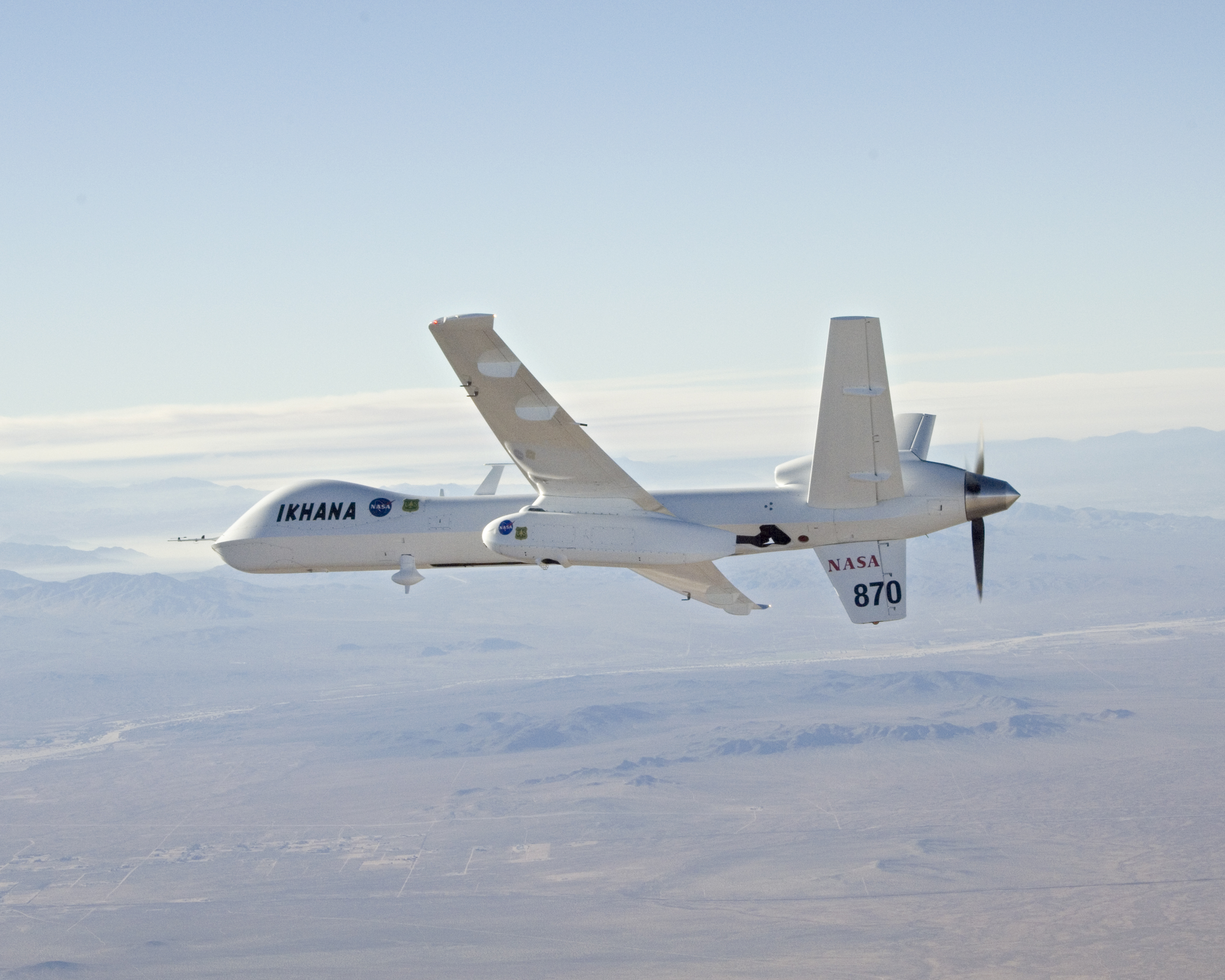
NASA's Ikhana unmanned aircraft on a wildfire imaging mission in Southern California.

Government agencies and emergency-management organizations use drones to improve situational awareness and to reduce the exposure of pilots and ground crews to hazardous conditions. In wildfire operations, drones may provide optical and thermal imagery, support incident command with near-real-time intelligence and, in some operations, assist prescribed fire through aerial ignition systems.

== History ==
One of the earliest high-profile examples of drone use in wildfire operations in the United States was NASA's Ikhana aircraft. In 2007, it flew wildfire imaging missions over California using thermal-infrared sensors to support emergency response. NASA later stated that in 2008 Ikhana was used in support of the California wildfires and that the imagery helped firefighters respond to more than 300 wildfires.

== Applications ==
=== Detection and mapping ===
Drones are used to collect visual and thermal imagery over active wildfires, helping responders identify hotspots, track fire spread and map fire perimeters. The United States Forest Service states that its UAS program supports wildfire suppression and other land-management activities, while the FAA describes UAS as providing real-time situational awareness and hotspot detection in high-risk environments.

=== Prescribed fire and aerial ignition ===
Drones are also used in prescribed burning and burnout operations. The United States Forest Service states that UAS are increasingly used for aerial ignition, replacing some low-altitude helicopter ignition missions and reducing risk exposure during incident response and prescribed fire projects.

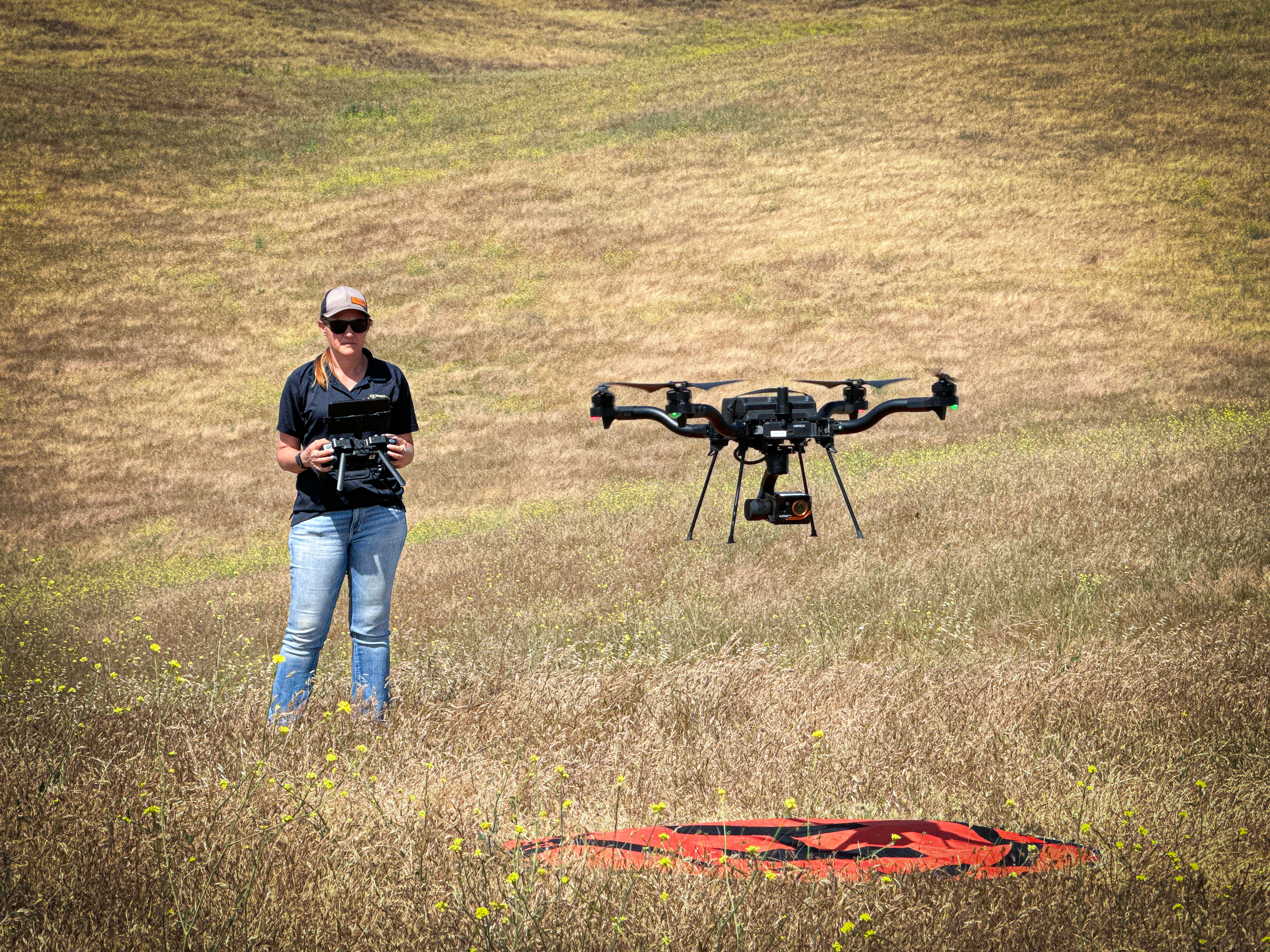
UAS aerial-ignition training in California in 2024.

The agency has also established specialized training for these operations, including the UAS Aerial Ignition Academy, which trains drone pilots in flight procedures, payload use and ignition concepts.

=== Post-fire assessment ===
After a wildfire, drones can be used to assess burn severity, inspect damaged infrastructure and support disaster-response mapping. The Forest Service identifies post-fire damage mapping and terrain assessment among the uses of UAS technology.

== Operational use by country ==
=== United States ===
In the United States, drones have become part of the wider wildfire-response system used by agencies such as the United States Forest Service and other federal partners. According to the FAA, drone operations in wildfire response are carried out in collaboration with the National Interagency Fire Center (NIFC), the Forest Service and the United States Department of the Interior, with an emphasis on safe integration into the national airspace system.

=== Greece ===
In Greece, drones have increasingly been incorporated into wildfire surveillance and early detection. In June 2024, the Ministry of Climate Crisis and Civil Protection announced the use of 25 drones for monitoring the mountainous areas of Attica, describing systems equipped with wide-angle and thermal cameras and used for day-and-night fire detection and prevention.

According to the Union Civil Protection Knowledge Network, during the 2024 fire season drones were deployed in 41 high-risk areas across Greece, providing live video feeds to the National Coordination Centre for Operations and Crisis Management and contributing to earlier and more effective response.

== Safety and airspace restrictions ==
The use of unauthorized drones near wildfires is treated as an aviation-safety issue because it can interfere with firefighting aircraft and emergency operations. In the United States, the FAA issues temporary flight restrictions (TFRs) for safety and security reasons, including natural disasters such as wildfires. These restrictions apply to aircraft, including drones, unless they have specific authorization.

== See also ==
- Aerial firefighting
- Prescribed burn
