= Saco Mercantile =

Historic place in Montana, United States

- U.S. National Register of Historic Places
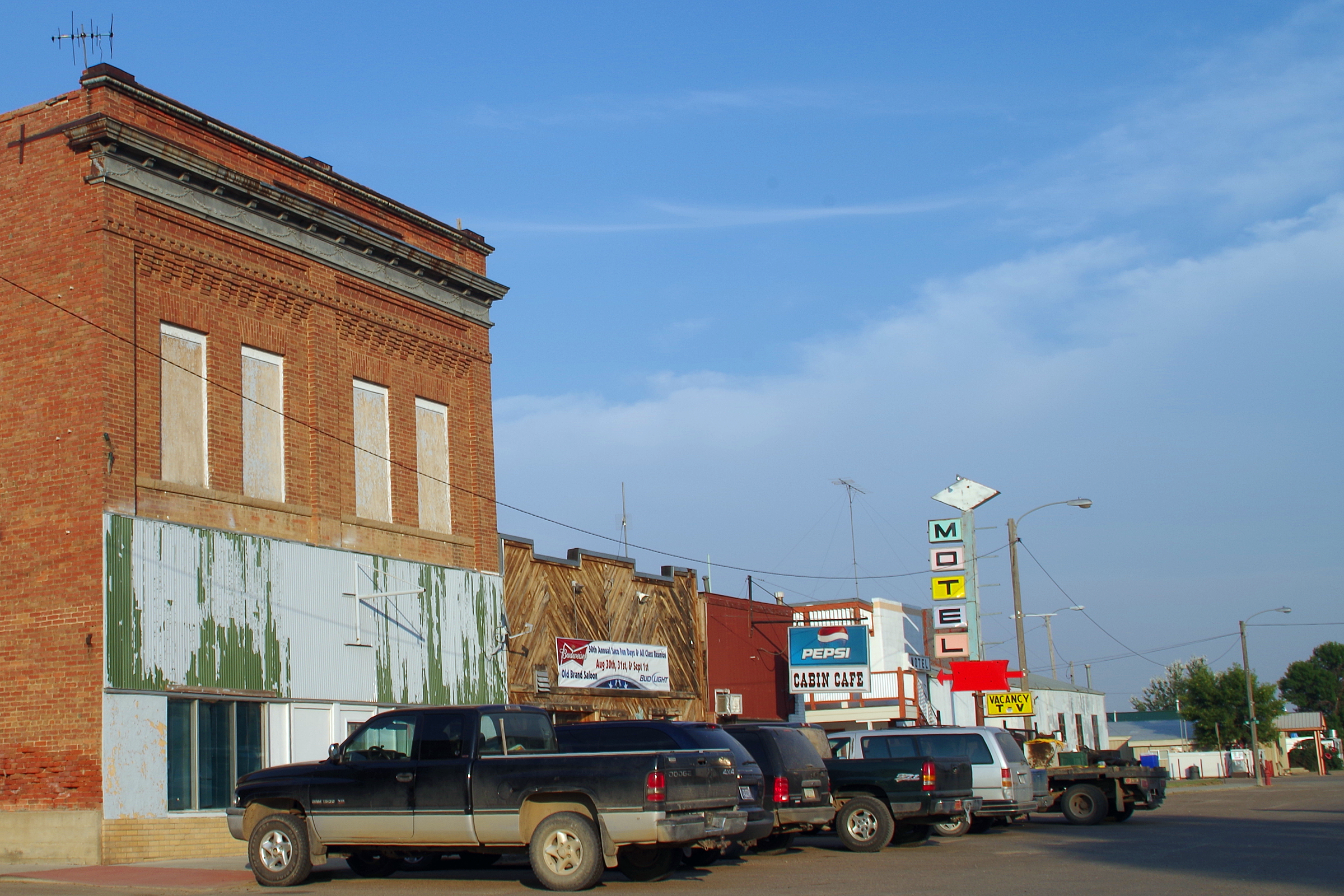

- Location within Montana Location within the United States
- Location: 201 Taylor St. Saco, Montana
- Coordinates: 48°27′22″N 107°20′30″W
- Area: less than one acre
- Built: 1907
- Architectural style: Western Commercial
- NRHP reference No.: 97001452
- Added to NRHP: December 8, 1997

Saco Mercantile is a site on the National Register of Historic Places located in Saco, Montana. It was added to the Register on December 8, 1997. It has also been known as the Saco Co-operative Store and as the C.P. Martin Store.

It is a two-story brick commercial building. Its NRHP nomination states that:

The Saco Mercantile's design embodies the typical characteristics of the Western Commercial style. The primary facade (south) is organized in a symmetrical, bipartite arrangement. This facade included a first floor storefront typical of the period, having a central entrance flanked by display windows, a lower window panel, and a transom across the top. A canvas storefront awning is pictured in historic photos of the building. Engaged pilasters enframe the storefront, and extend up to visually support the cornice. A third pilaster divides the upper story into two equal parts, each part houses two double-hung windows. These openings are finished with flat brick arches and a continuous stone sill stretching between the pilasters. An ornate metal and brick cornice crowns the front. It begins with a corbeled brick stretcher course above which are two recessed brick panels. Above the panels is a projecting metal cornice with garlands across the frieze. Above this, a short brick parapet rises to a secondary brick cornice which echoes the lines of the lower metalwork.
