= 2018 Nevada wildfires =

Wildfire season in Nevada, United States

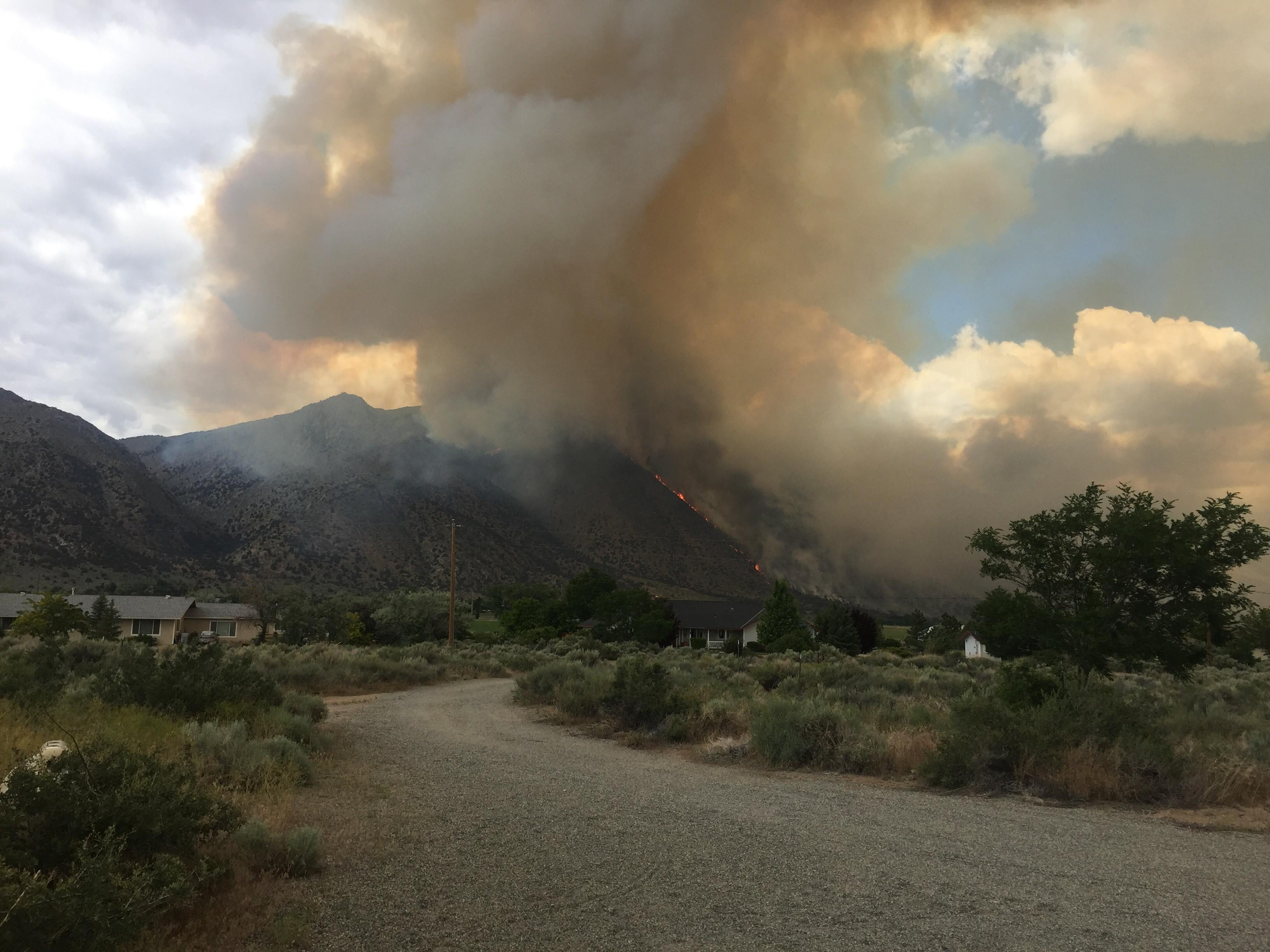
- The Upper Colony Fire on June 20
- Date: June 2018 – November 2018

In 2018 the wildfire season in Nevada began in June and ended November 2018. The season that set the record with the most destructive fire in state history.

== List of wildfires ==
- Martin Fire (July 4–August 2), the largest in state history with 439,000 acres (178,000 ha) burned
- Boone Springs Fire (July 4–July 9), burned 42 miles (68 km) southwest of West Wendover.
- South Sugarloaf Fire (August 17–September)
- Upper Colony Fire (June 17–June 22), caused by a mechanical malfunction in a truck. Burned 15 miles (24 km) southwest of Yerington in Smith Valley.
- Perry Fire
