= East Malta Colony, Montana =

- Census-designated place
- Location within Montana Location within the United States
- Coordinates: 48°20′56″N 107°36′29″W
- Country: United States
- State: Montana
- County: Phillips

Area
  - Total: 0.25 sq mi (0.64 km^{2})
  - Land: 0.24 sq mi (0.63 km^{2})
  - Water: 0.0039 sq mi (0.01 km^{2})
- Elevation: 2,254 ft (687 m)

Population (2020)
  - Total: 97
  - Density: 400.4/sq mi (154.58/km^{2})
- Time zone: UTC-7 (Mountain (MST))
  - Summer (DST): UTC-6 (MDT)
- ZIP Code: 59538 (Malta)
- Area code: 406
- FIPS code: 30-23168
- GNIS feature ID: 2804313

East Malta Colony is a Hutterite community and census-designated place (CDP) in Phillips County, Montana, United States. As of the 2020 census, East Malta Colony had a population of 97. It is in the eastern part of the county, 14 miles (23 km) by road east of Malta, the county seat. It sits on high ground just west of Beaver Creek, a north-flowing tributary of the Milk River.

The community was first listed as a CDP prior to the 2020 census.

== Demographics ==
Historical population
Census	Pop.	Note	%±
2020	97		—
U.S. Decennial Census
