= Hewitt Lake National Wildlife Refuge =

National Wildlife Refuge in Montana, United States

- IUCN category IV (habitat/species management area)
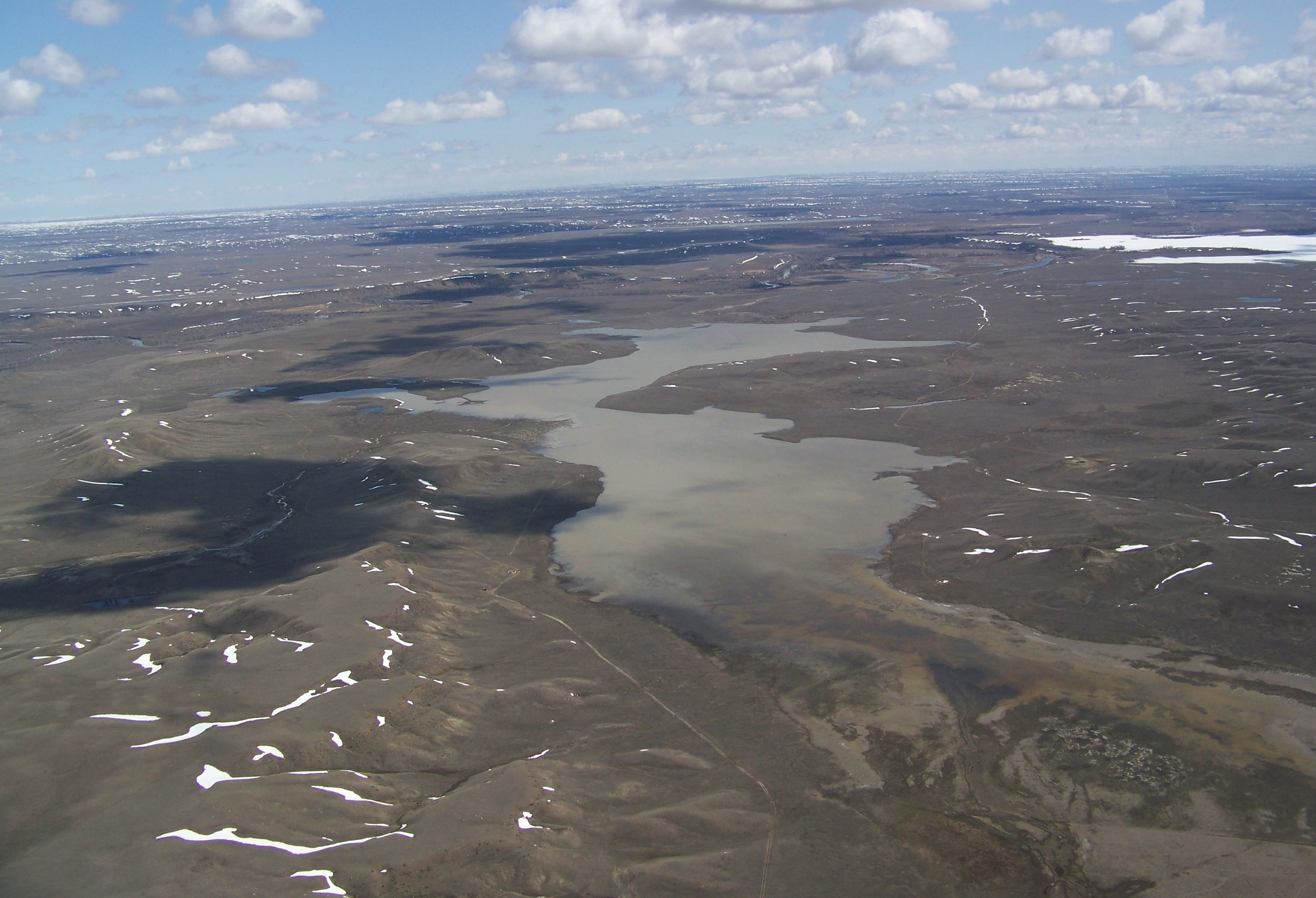
- Aerial view of Hewitt Lake NWR

- Location within the United States
- Location: Phillips County, Montana, USA
- Nearest city: Malta, MT
- Coordinates: 48°32′06″N 107°37′20″W
- Area: 1,360 acres (550 ha) in 2010
- Established: 1938
- Governing body: U.S. Fish and Wildlife Service
- Website: Hewitt Lake National Wildlife Refuge

Hewitt Lake National Wildlife Refuge is a 1,360-acre (550 ha) National Wildlife Refuge in the northern region of the U.S. state of Montana. This refuge is a part of the Bowdoin Wetland Management District (WMD), and is unstaffed. The refuge is partly owned by the U.S. Government, while the rest is an easement with local landowners. The refuge is managed from Bowdoin National Wildlife Refuge.
