= Nelson Reservoir (Arizona) =

Lake in Apache County, Arizona

- Location within Arizona
- Location: Apache County, Arizona
- Coordinates: 34°3′21.86″N 109°11′25.63″W
- Type: Reservoir
- Basin countries: United States
- Surface area: 60 acres (24 ha)
- Average depth: 15 ft (4.6 m)
- Surface elevation: 7,410 ft (2,260 m)

Nelson Reservoir is a reservoir located in Apache County, Arizona between Springerville and Alpine. The Reservoir is a long and narrow lake which follows the Nutrioso Creek Valley for nearly a mile. Fish that remain in Nelson Reservoir after summer stockings can grow to good size, making it a popular fishing site with local anglers.

== Locations ==
Nelson Reservoir is situated at 7,412 feet (2,259 m) near the Apache-Sitgreaves National Forests; its facilities are managed by that authority.

It is located on the south of Correjo Crossing, a pass in the wall of the canyon and site of prehistoric occupation.

== Description ==
Nelson Reservoir is located on Nutrioso Creek. It has 90 acres (36 ha) with a maximum depth of 24 feet (7.3 m) and an average depth of 15 feet (4.6 m). When the lake stops spilling in the spring, it is stocked with up to 20,000 catchable-sized rainbow trout until Labor Day. Stocking may end sooner if water quality conditions become unfavorable. Nelson Reservoir is subject to algae blooms and excessive weed growth as summer progresses. The lake contains native bluehead suckers and illegally introduced black crappie and green sunfish. The lake once contained brown, cutthroat and brook trout, but none remain today.

== History ==
Nelson Reservoir was named after Edmond Nelson, who owned the land in 1918 and had fished there as early as 1891.

Nelson and other family members began building the Nelson Reservoir in February 1891. After many years of work it was completed and provided water to the farms in the area, which was its original purpose.

== Fish species ==
- Rainbow
- Crappie
- Sunfish
