= Nelson Reservoir (Montana) =

Lake in Phillips County, Montana

- Location within Montana
- Location: Phillips County, Montana
- Coordinates: 48.49111°N 107.54851°W
- Type: Reservoir
- Basin countries: United States
- Surface area: 4,114.5 acres (1,665.1 ha)
- Average depth: 19 ft (5.8 m)
- Max. depth: 47 ft (14 m)
- Water volume: 79,200 acre⋅ft (97,700,000 m^{3})
- Surface elevation: 2,217 ft (676 m)

Nelson Reservoir is a reservoir located in Phillips County, Montana, northeast of Malta and northwest of Saco, Montana, created by damming the Milk River, a tributary of the Missouri River.

It is stocked annually with 100,000 walleye as well as yellow perch and northern pike. There is both warm-weather and ice fishing.

The Nelson Dam is maintained by the Bureau of Reclamation. It is a homogeneous earthfill dam originally built in 1914-1915 and enlarged in 1921–1922. It provides water storage for irrigation.

There is a recreation area and campground adjacent to the reservoir.

It is named for H.H. Nelson, who formed The Milk River Water User's Association to lobby for building diversion dikes and dams.
