= Bowdoin National Wildlife Refuge =

Nature reserve in Montana, United States

- IUCN category IV (habitat/species management area)
- Location within the United States
- Location: Phillips County, Montana, USA
- Nearest city: Malta, MT
- Coordinates: 48°24′08″N 107°39′47″W
- Area: 15,551 acres (62.93 km^{2})
- Established: 1936
- Visitors: 25,000 estimated (in 2013)
- Governing body: U.S. Fish and Wildlife Service
- Website: Bowdoin National Wildlife Refuge

Bowdoin National Wildlife Refuge is a 15,551-acre (6,293 ha) National Wildlife Refuge (NWR) located in the north-central region of the U.S. state of Montana. The refuge is 7 mi (11 km) northeast of Malta, Montana in the Milk River Valley and is managed by the U.S. Fish and Wildlife Service.

== History ==
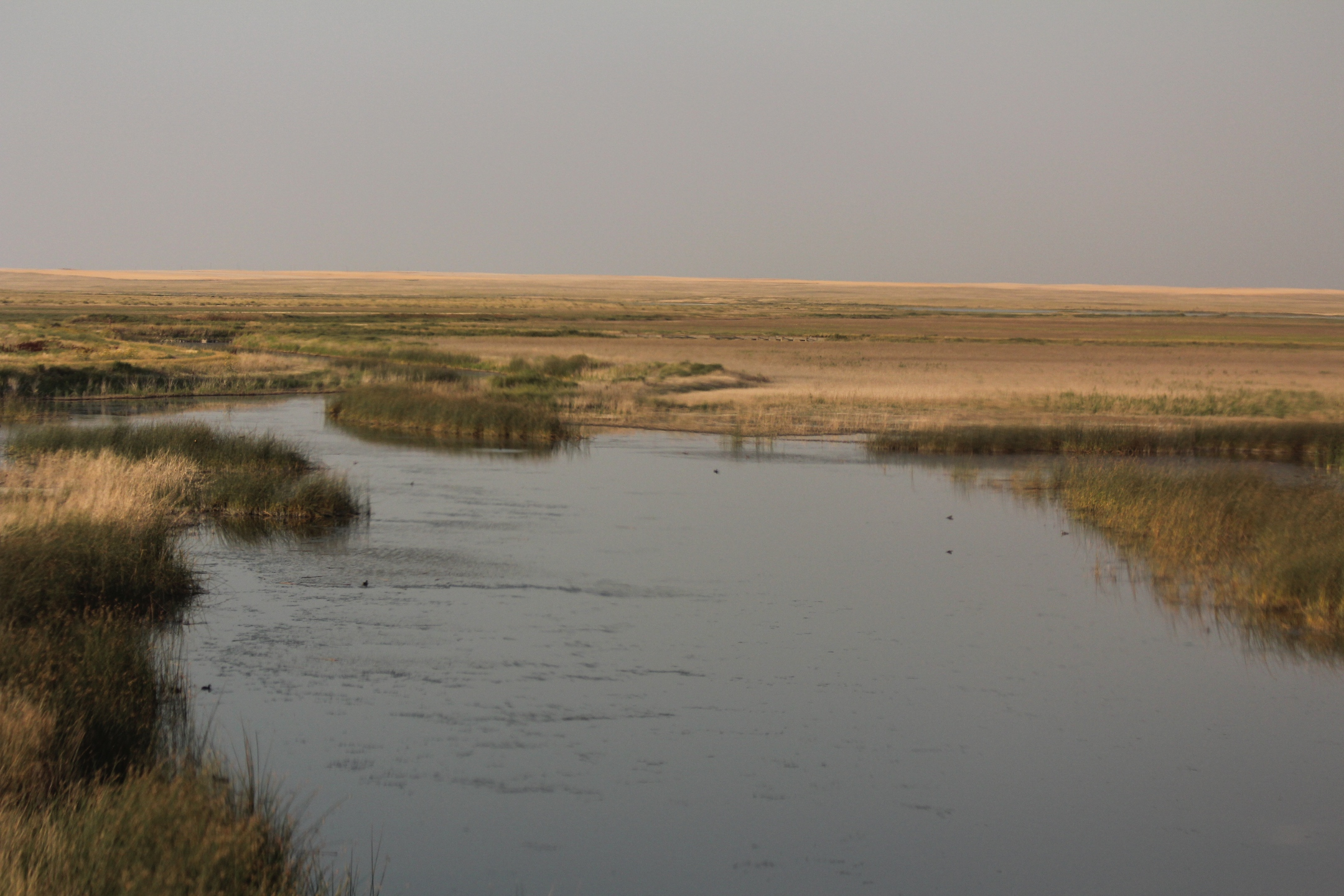
Lake in Bowdoin National Wildlife Refuge

Bowdoin NWR was previously managed as part of irrigation efforts by the U.S. Bureau of Reclamation to conserve water that would flow into Lake Bowdoin. The seasonal floods from spring snow melt created excellent habitat for migratory and nesting waterfowl as well as raptors such as the bald eagle and peregrine falcon. Lake Bowdoin is on both the Central and Pacific Flyways used by migratory birds and was well known by locals and naturalists as having the largest numbers of migratory birds in Montana. In an effort to better protect the habitat, Lake Bowdoin and the surrounding region were set aside as a refuge in 1936 and administration passed to the U.S. Fish and Wildlife Service.

== Fauna ==
As of 2008, 263 species of birds have been observed at Bowdoin NWR. Nesting waterfowl include the American white pelican, double-crested cormorant, great blue heron, white-faced ibis and black-crowned night heron. Waterfowl species such as the northern pintail, green-winged teal, American wigeon and a number of grebe species including both the eared and western grebe also nest at the refuge. Several species of gulls such as Franklin's gull, ring-billed gull and the California gull and passerine species including the red-winged blackbird, western meadowlark, yellow-headed blackbird, American goldfinch, eastern kingbird and lark bunting have also been known to nest on the refuge.

Mammal species including the bobcat, beaver, raccoon, coyote, skunk, white-tailed deer and pronghorn live on the refuge. After the refuge was first established, the pronghorn were then protected from hunting, allowing their numbers to swell from 7 to 160 individuals during the 1940s. Pronghorn population figures for the early 21st century averaged between 100 and 150 individuals.
