= Phillips County, Montana =

County in Montana, United States

- County
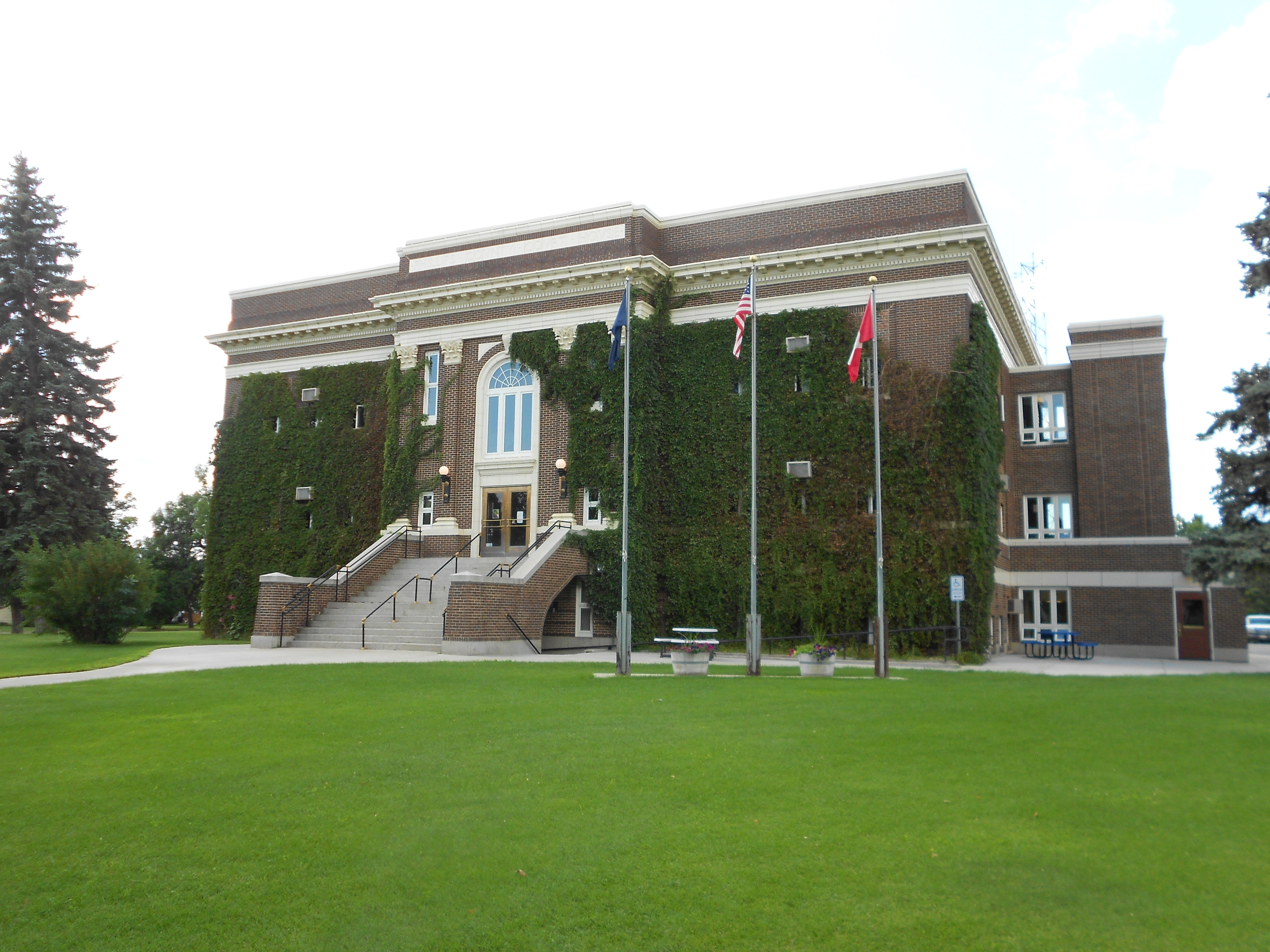
- Phillips County Courthouse in Malta

- Location within the U.S. state of Montana
- Coordinates: 48°16′N 107°55′W
- Country: United States
- State: Montana
- Founded: February 5, 1915
- Seat: Malta
- Largest city: Malta

Area
  - Total: 5,212 sq mi (13,500 km^{2})
  - Land: 5,140 sq mi (13,300 km^{2})
  - Water: 72 sq mi (190 km^{2}) 1.4%

Population (2020)
  - Total: 4,217
  - Estimate (2025): 4,203 ▼
  - Density: 0.8/sq mi (0.31/km^{2})
- Time zone: UTC−7 (Mountain)
  - Summer (DST): UTC−6 (MDT)
- Congressional district: 2nd
- Montana county number 11

Phillips County is a county in the U.S. state of Montana. As of the 2020 census, the population was 4,217. Its county seat is Malta. Before February 5, 1915, Phillips County was part of Blaine County, and before 1912 both were part of Chouteau County. It was named for rancher and state senator Benjamin D. Phillips.

Its northern boundary is the Canada–United States border with Saskatchewan. The Missouri River defines its southern boundary.

== Geography ==
According to the United States Census Bureau, the county has a total area of 5,212 square miles (13,500 km^{2}), of which 5,140 square miles (13,300 km^{2}) is land and 72 square miles (190 km^{2}) (1.4%) is water. It is the second-largest county in Montana by land area and third-largest by total area.

=== Adjacent counties and rural municipalities ===
- Blaine County - west
- Fergus County - southwest
- Petroleum County - south
- Garfield County - southeast
- Valley County - east
- Rural Municipality (RM) of Lone Tree No. 18, Saskatchewan (SK) - north
- RM of Val Marie No. 17, SK - north
- RM of Mankota No. 45, SK - northeast

=== National protected areas ===
- Bowdoin National Wildlife Refuge
- Charles M. Russell National Wildlife Refuge (part)
- Hewitt Lake National Wildlife Refuge
- UL Bend National Wildlife Refuge
- Upper Missouri River Breaks National Monument (part)

== Demographics ==
Historical population
| Census | Pop. | Note | %± |
|---|---|---|---|
| 1920 | 9,311 | | — |
| 1930 | 8,208 | | −11.8% |
| 1940 | 7,892 | | −3.8% |
| 1950 | 6,334 | | −19.7% |
| 1960 | 6,027 | | −4.8% |
| 1970 | 5,386 | | −10.6% |
| 1980 | 5,367 | | −0.4% |
| 1990 | 5,163 | | −3.8% |
| 2000 | 4,601 | | −10.9% |
| 2010 | 4,253 | | −7.6% |
| 2020 | 4,217 | | −0.8% |
| 2025 (est.) | 4,203 | ▼ | −0.3% |
U.S. Decennial Census

=== 2020 census ===
As of the 2020 census, the county had a population of 4,217.

Of the residents, 23.3% were under the age of 18 and 23.4% were 65 years of age or older; the median age was 44.7 years. For every 100 females there were 100.7 males, and for every 100 females age 18 and over there were 98.6 males. 0.0% of residents lived in urban areas and 100.0% lived in rural areas.

The racial makeup of the county was 83.6% White, 0.1% Black or African American, 8.1% American Indian and Alaska Native, 0.4% Asian, 1.2% from some other race, and 6.7% from two or more races. Hispanic or Latino residents of any race comprised 2.7% of the population.

There were 1,770 households in the county, of which 25.9% had children under the age of 18 living with them and 23.8% had a female householder with no spouse or partner present. About 32.5% of all households were made up of individuals and 15.5% had someone living alone who was 65 years of age or older.

There were 2,229 housing units, of which 20.6% were vacant. Among occupied housing units, 74.2% were owner-occupied and 25.8% were renter-occupied. The homeowner vacancy rate was 1.7% and the rental vacancy rate was 9.8%.

=== 2010 census ===
As of the 2010 census, there were 4,253 people, 1,819 households, and 1,159 families residing in the county. The population density was 0.8 inhabitants per square mile (0.31/km^{2}). There were 2,335 housing units at an average density of 0.5 per square mile (0.19/km^{2}). The racial makeup of the county was 87.0% white, 8.3% American Indian, 0.2% Asian, 0.4% from other races, and 4.0% from two or more races. Those of Hispanic or Latino origin made up 1.9% of the population. In terms of ancestry, 26.2% were Norwegian, 24.3% were German, 13.4% were Irish, 10.1% were American, and 9.0% were English.

Of the 1,819 households, 27.6% had children under the age of 18 living with them, 52.9% were married couples living together, 7.4% had a female householder with no husband present, 36.3% were non-families, and 32.2% of all households were made up of individuals. The average household size was 2.27 and the average family size was 2.86. The median age was 46.8 years.

The median income for a household in the county was $36,453 and the median income for a family was $55,362. Males had a median income of $41,826 versus $26,417 for females. The per capita income for the county was $24,227. About 11.4% of families and 13.5% of the population were below the poverty line, including 17.1% of those under age 18 and 4.8% of those age 65 or over.

== Politics ==
From its creation until 1964, voters of Phillips County were fairly balanced; they selected Democratic Party candidates in 58% of national elections. After 1964 the Republican presidential candidate has garnered the county's vote in every election.

United States presidential election results for Phillips County, Montana
| Year | Republican | | Democratic | | Third party(ies) | |
| Year | No. | % | No. | % | No. | % |
|---|---|---|---|---|---|---|
| 1916 | 999 | 42.42% | 1,252 | 53.16% | 104 | 4.42% |
| 1920 | 1,693 | 67.13% | 648 | 25.69% | 181 | 7.18% |
| 1924 | 1,236 | 46.69% | 473 | 17.87% | 938 | 35.44% |
| 1928 | 1,671 | 59.09% | 1,135 | 40.13% | 22 | 0.78% |
| 1932 | 1,127 | 33.90% | 2,054 | 61.79% | 143 | 4.30% |
| 1936 | 850 | 24.33% | 2,555 | 73.13% | 89 | 2.55% |
| 1940 | 1,110 | 32.98% | 2,225 | 66.10% | 31 | 0.92% |
| 1944 | 1,089 | 42.82% | 1,435 | 56.43% | 19 | 0.75% |
| 1948 | 964 | 37.52% | 1,506 | 58.62% | 99 | 3.85% |
| 1952 | 1,771 | 58.70% | 1,224 | 40.57% | 22 | 0.73% |
| 1956 | 1,605 | 52.94% | 1,427 | 47.06% | 0 | 0.00% |
| 1960 | 1,457 | 49.81% | 1,455 | 49.74% | 13 | 0.44% |
| 1964 | 1,242 | 43.47% | 1,612 | 56.42% | 3 | 0.11% |
| 1968 | 1,353 | 51.41% | 1,100 | 41.79% | 179 | 6.80% |
| 1972 | 1,659 | 64.88% | 828 | 32.38% | 70 | 2.74% |
| 1976 | 1,347 | 54.18% | 1,117 | 44.93% | 22 | 0.88% |
| 1980 | 1,723 | 64.95% | 745 | 28.08% | 185 | 6.97% |
| 1984 | 1,934 | 70.35% | 787 | 28.63% | 28 | 1.02% |
| 1988 | 1,462 | 60.26% | 905 | 37.30% | 59 | 2.43% |
| 1992 | 1,026 | 39.09% | 634 | 24.15% | 965 | 36.76% |
| 1996 | 1,392 | 55.44% | 705 | 28.08% | 414 | 16.49% |
| 2000 | 1,727 | 77.51% | 423 | 18.99% | 78 | 3.50% |
| 2004 | 1,677 | 77.28% | 456 | 21.01% | 37 | 1.71% |
| 2008 | 1,423 | 67.03% | 638 | 30.05% | 62 | 2.92% |
| 2012 | 1,688 | 75.76% | 471 | 21.14% | 69 | 3.10% |
| 2016 | 1,723 | 79.36% | 318 | 14.65% | 130 | 5.99% |
| 2020 | 1,936 | 81.28% | 416 | 17.46% | 30 | 1.26% |
| 2024 | 1,753 | 80.08% | 385 | 17.59% | 51 | 2.33% |

== Communities ==
=== City ===
- Malta (county seat)

=== Towns ===
- Dodson
- Saco

=== Census-designated places ===
- East Malta Colony
- Landusky
- Loring Colony
- Sleeping Buffalo
- Whitewater
- Zortman

=== Other unincorporated communities ===
- Bowdoin
- Caldwell
- Cole
- Content
- Cree Crossing
- Jordan Crossing
- Loring
- Morgan
- Tattnall
- Wagner

== See also ==
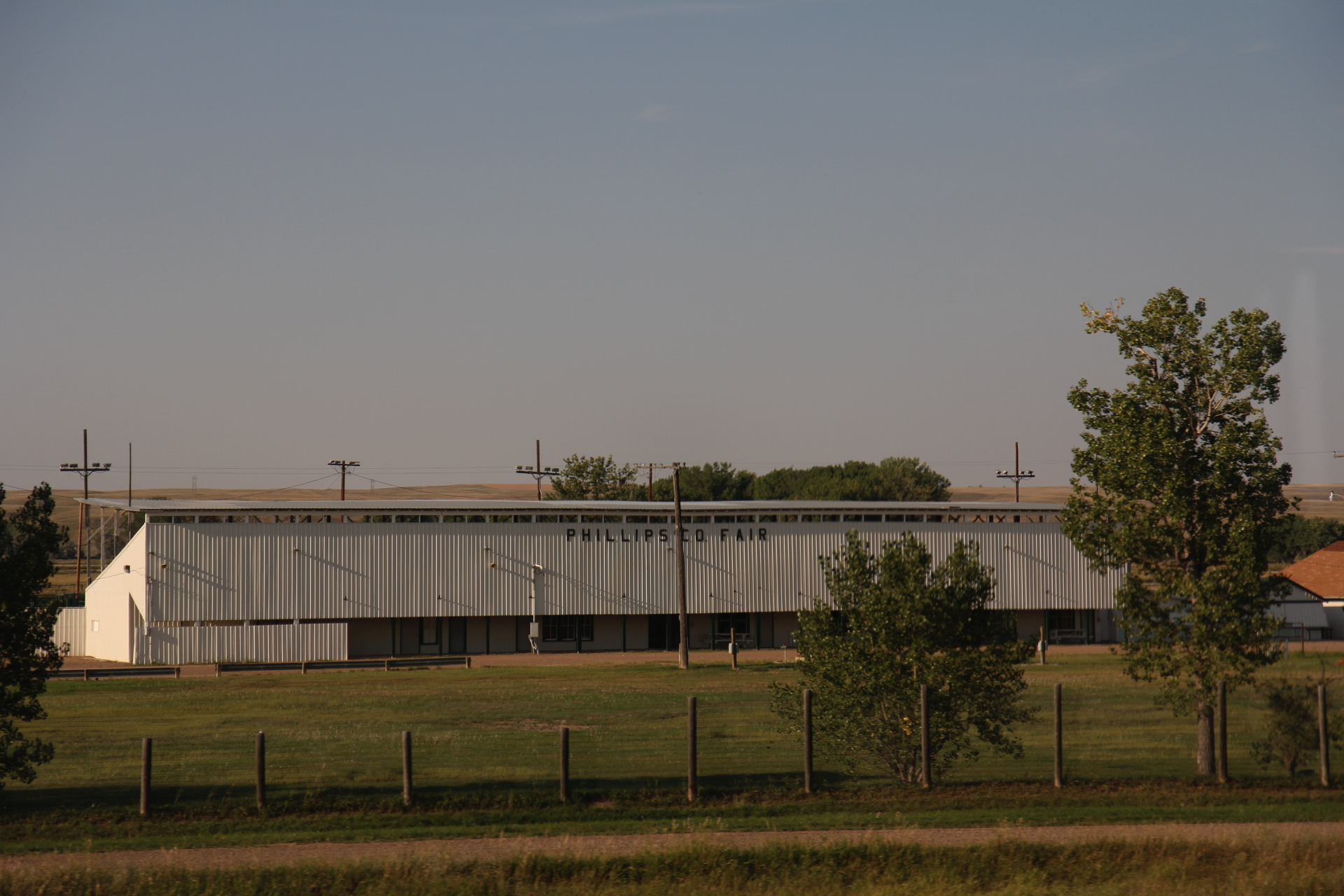
The fairgrounds for Phillips County

- List of lakes in Phillips County, Montana
- List of mountains in Phillips County, Montana
- National Register of Historic Places listings in Phillips County MT
