= Wilson Reservoir (Nevada) =

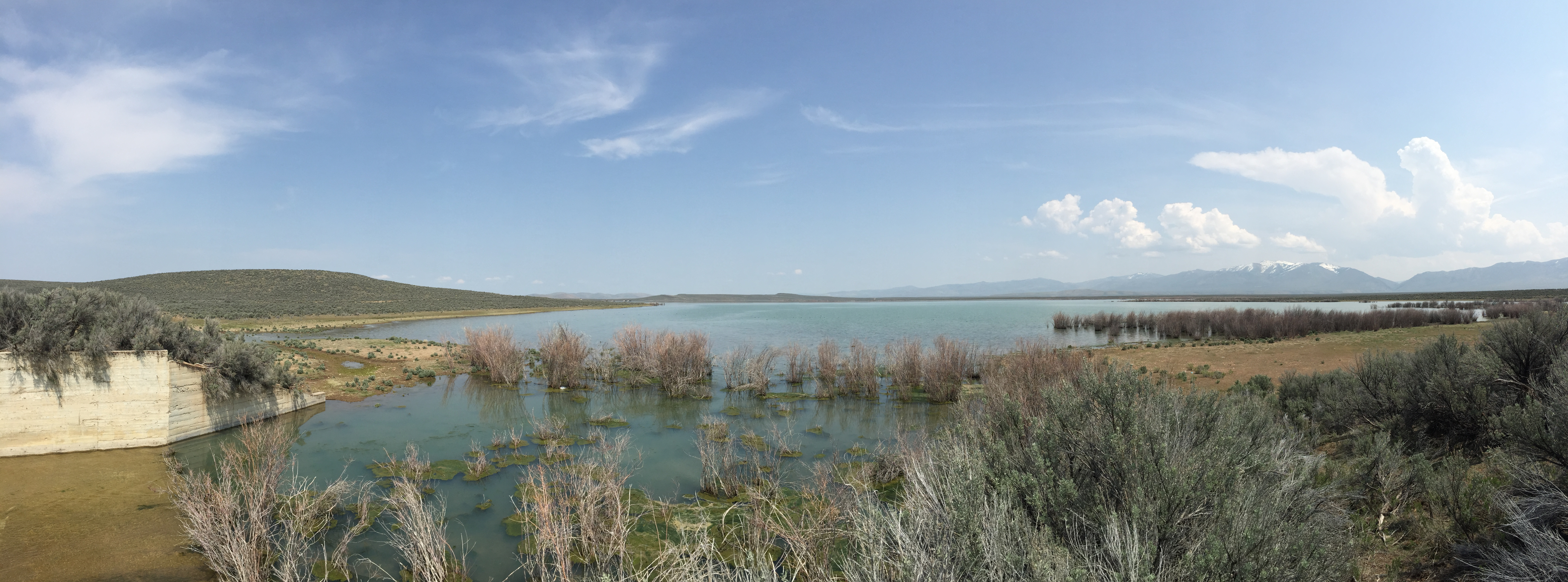
- Panorama across Wilson Reservoir, Nevada from the diversion spillway

- Location of Wilson Reservoir in Nevada
- Location: Elko County, Nevada
- Coordinates: 41°40′36″N 116°19′52″W
- Type: Reservoir
- Primary inflows: Wilson Creek
- Primary outflows: Wilson Creek
- Basin countries: United States
- Surface area: 800 acres (3.2 km^{2})
- Max. depth: 30 ft (9.1 m)
- Water volume: 10,000 acre⋅ft (12,000,000 m^{3})
- Surface elevation: 5,302 ft (1,616 m)

Wilson Reservoir is a man-made lake in Elko County, Nevada in the United States. The reservoir was initially created in 1954 by the construction of Wilson Reservoir Dam. The Petan Ranch owns the reservoir, water rights, and a cabin, but public land surrounding the reservoir is administered by the Bureau of Land Management. The reservoir impounds the Wilson Creek for irrigation storage. It is located 83 miles north-northwest of Elko.

== See also ==
- List of dams in the Columbia River watershed
