= Saco, Montana =

- Town
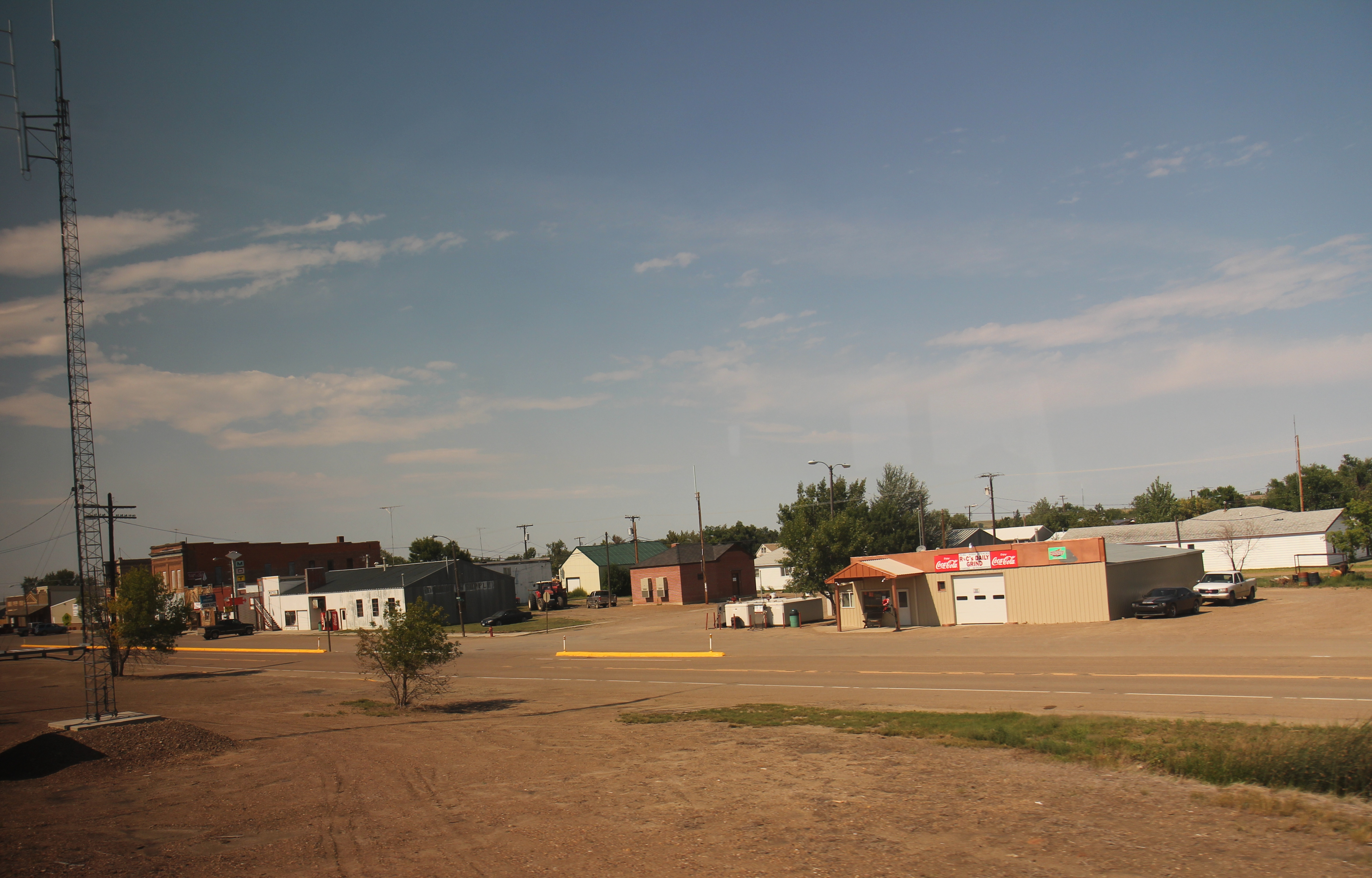
- Downtown Saco

- Location of Saco, Montana
- Coordinates: 48°27′25″N 107°20′29″W
- Country: United States
- State: Montana
- County: Phillips

Area
  - Total: 0.31 sq mi (0.79 km^{2})
  - Land: 0.31 sq mi (0.79 km^{2})
  - Water: 0 sq mi (0.00 km^{2})
- Elevation: 2,182 ft (665 m)

Population (2020)
  - Total: 159
  - Density: 523.1/sq mi (201.97/km^{2})
- Time zone: UTC-7 (Mountain (MST))
  - Summer (DST): UTC-6 (MDT)
- ZIP code: 59261
- Area code: 406
- FIPS code: 30-65050
- GNIS feature ID: 2412590
- Website: www.sacomontana.net

Saco is a town in Phillips County, Montana, United States. The population was 159 at the 2020 census.

== History ==
Faced with the task of naming hundreds of station stops along the High Line, Great Northern Railway officials resorted to "globe trotting." According to one story, an official spun a globe and put his finger on Saco, Maine, thus giving the town its name. Another story tells that the name is a contraction of "Sacajawea." For two years, Saco boasted the Guinness world record for making the world's largest hamburger, building the 6,040-pound burger from the beef of 17 cattle in 1999.

== Geography ==
According to the United States Census Bureau, the town has a total area of 0.33 square miles (0.85 km^{2}), all land.

=== Climate ===
According to the Köppen Climate Classification system, Saco has a semi-arid climate, abbreviated "BSk" on climate maps.

Climate data for Saco, Montana, 1991–2020 normals, extremes 1966–present
Month	Jan	Feb	Mar	Apr	May	Jun	Jul	Aug	Sep	Oct	Nov	Dec	Year
Record high °F (°C)	62 (17)	72 (22)	79 (26)	92 (33)	100 (38)	104 (40)	104 (40)	105 (41)	100 (38)	89 (32)	78 (26)	67 (19)	105 (41)
Mean maximum °F (°C)	48.5 (9.2)	51.2 (10.7)	66.0 (18.9)	79.6 (26.4)	85.6 (29.8)	91.3 (32.9)	95.5 (35.3)	96.2 (35.7)	91.1 (32.8)	80.3 (26.8)	64.1 (17.8)	48.9 (9.4)	98.1 (36.7)
Mean daily maximum °F (°C)	25.6 (−3.6)	30.1 (−1.1)	42.8 (6.0)	57.3 (14.1)	67.5 (19.7)	74.3 (23.5)	82.8 (28.2)	82.1 (27.8)	71.5 (21.9)	57.2 (14.0)	40.8 (4.9)	29.0 (−1.7)	55.1 (12.8)
Daily mean °F (°C)	13.6 (−10.2)	17.8 (−7.9)	30.1 (−1.1)	43.2 (6.2)	53.7 (12.1)	62.3 (16.8)	69.0 (20.6)	67.6 (19.8)	56.9 (13.8)	43.4 (6.3)	28.7 (−1.8)	17.4 (−8.1)	42.0 (5.5)
Mean daily minimum °F (°C)	1.5 (−16.9)	5.5 (−14.7)	17.4 (−8.1)	29.1 (−1.6)	39.9 (4.4)	50.4 (10.2)	55.2 (12.9)	53.1 (11.7)	42.3 (5.7)	29.7 (−1.3)	16.6 (−8.6)	5.9 (−14.5)	28.9 (−1.7)
Mean minimum °F (°C)	−27.4 (−33.0)	−19.5 (−28.6)	−6.3 (−21.3)	14.1 (−9.9)	25.8 (−3.4)	39.6 (4.2)	45.6 (7.6)	41.1 (5.1)	28.7 (−1.8)	13.7 (−10.2)	−5.7 (−20.9)	−19.4 (−28.6)	−33.3 (−36.3)
Record low °F (°C)	−51 (−46)	−45 (−43)	−34 (−37)	−5 (−21)	14 (−10)	28 (−2)	34 (1)	31 (−1)	17 (−8)	−9 (−23)	−37 (−38)	−48 (−44)	−51 (−46)
Average precipitation inches (mm)	0.26 (6.6)	0.33 (8.4)	0.53 (13)	1.05 (27)	1.77 (45)	3.01 (76)	1.69 (43)	1.35 (34)	1.35 (34)	1.05 (27)	0.54 (14)	0.43 (11)	13.36 (339)
Average snowfall inches (cm)	4.3 (11)	4.9 (12)	7.0 (18)	2.3 (5.8)	0.4 (1.0)	0.0 (0.0)	0.0 (0.0)	0.0 (0.0)	0.0 (0.0)	0.0 (0.0)	0.5 (1.3)	2.3 (5.8)	4.9 (12)
Average extreme snow depth inches (cm)	6.6 (17)	6.5 (17)	4.5 (11)	1.8 (4.6)	0.6 (1.5)	0.0 (0.0)	0.0 (0.0)	0.0 (0.0)	0.0 (0.0)	1.0 (2.5)	2.8 (7.1)	5.7 (14)	9.0 (23)
Average precipitation days (≥ 0.01 in)	3.7	3.2	3.5	5.4	7.1	9.6	6.6	5.0	5.1	3.9	3.4	3.8	60.3
Average snowy days (≥ 0.1 in)	3.2	3.6	1.2	0.3	0.0	0.0	0.0	0.0	0.0	0.2	1.2	3.2	12.9
Source 1: NOAA
Source 2: National Weather Service

== Demographics ==
Historical population
Census	Pop.	Note	%±
1920	425		—
1930	506		19.1%
1940	452		−10.7%
1950	539		19.2%
1960	490		−9.1%
1970	356		−27.3%
1980	252		−29.2%
1990	261		3.6%
2000	224		−14.2%
2010	197		−12.1%
2020	159		−19.3%
U.S. Decennial Census

=== 2010 census ===
As of the census of 2010, there were 197 people, 102 households, and 47 families residing in the town. The population density was 597.0 inhabitants per square mile (230.5/km^{2}). There were 127 housing units at an average density of 384.8 per square mile (148.6/km^{2}). The racial makeup of the town was 94.4% White, 1.0% Asian, and 4.6% from two or more races. Hispanic or Latino of any race were 0.5% of the population.

There were 102 households, of which 24.5% had children under the age of 18 living with them, 39.2% were married couples living together, 4.9% had a female householder with no husband present, 2.0% had a male householder with no wife present, and 53.9% were non-families. 47.1% of all households were made up of individuals, and 23.6% had someone living alone who was 65 years of age or older. The average household size was 1.93 and the average family size was 2.83.

The median age in the town was 48.1 years. 21.3% of residents were under the age of 18; 2.1% were between the ages of 18 and 24; 22.4% were from 25 to 44; 33% were from 45 to 64; and 21.3% were 65 years of age or older. The gender makeup of the town was 50.3% male and 49.7% female.

=== 2000 census ===
As of the census of 2000, there were 224 people, 109 households, and 57 families residing in the town. The population density was 683.9 inhabitants per square mile (264.1/km^{2}). There were 135 housing units at an average density of 412.2 per square mile (159.2/km^{2}). The racial makeup of the town was 96.43% White, 1.79% Native American, and 1.79% from two or more races.

There were 109 households, out of which 23.9% had children under the age of 18 living with them, 41.3% were married couples living together, 8.3% had a female householder with no husband present, and 46.8% were non-families. 44.0% of all households were made up of individuals, and 22.9% had someone living alone who was 65 years of age or older. The average household size was 2.06 and the average family size was 2.84.

In the town, the population was spread out, with 23.7% under the age of 18, 3.6% from 18 to 24, 26.3% from 25 to 44, 24.6% from 45 to 64, and 21.9% who were 65 years of age or older. The median age was 43 years. For every 100 females there were 98.2 males. For every 100 females age 18 and over, there were 94.3 males.

The median income for a household in the town was $23,125, and the median income for a family was $26,667. Males had a median income of $23,125 versus $24,375 for females. The per capita income for the town was $16,421. About 14.3% of families and 14.0% of the population were below the poverty line, including 22.0% of those under the age of eighteen and 13.2% of those 65 or over.

== Government ==
Incumbent mayor Wayne Woodall was unopposed in the November 2025 election. Woodall was originally appointed interim mayor after the death of mayor Craig Robinson. He then defeated L.A. "Mac" McIntosh in the November 2021 election.

== Education ==
Saco School District educates students from kindergarten through 12th grade. Their team name is the Panthers.

Phillips County Library has a branch location in Saco.

== Media ==
The Phillips County News is a weekly local newspaper. They provide a printed paper as well as news online.

== Transportation ==
Amtrak’s Empire Builder, which operates between Seattle/Portland and Chicago, passes through the town on BNSF tracks, but makes no stop. The nearest station is located in Malta, 28 miles (45 km) to the west.

== Notable people ==
- Wayne Stahl, Montana Legislature member

== Images ==
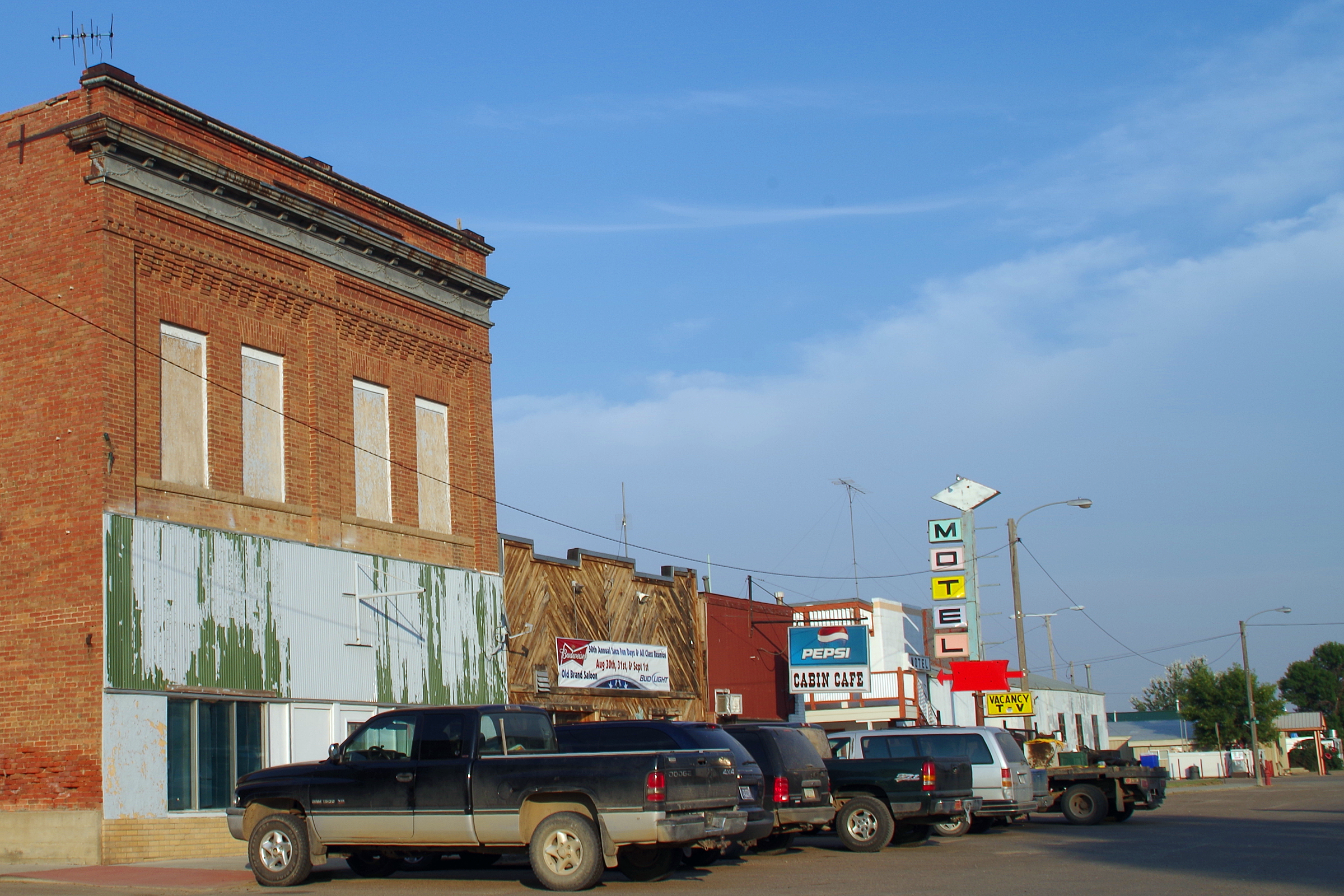
Saco Mercantile

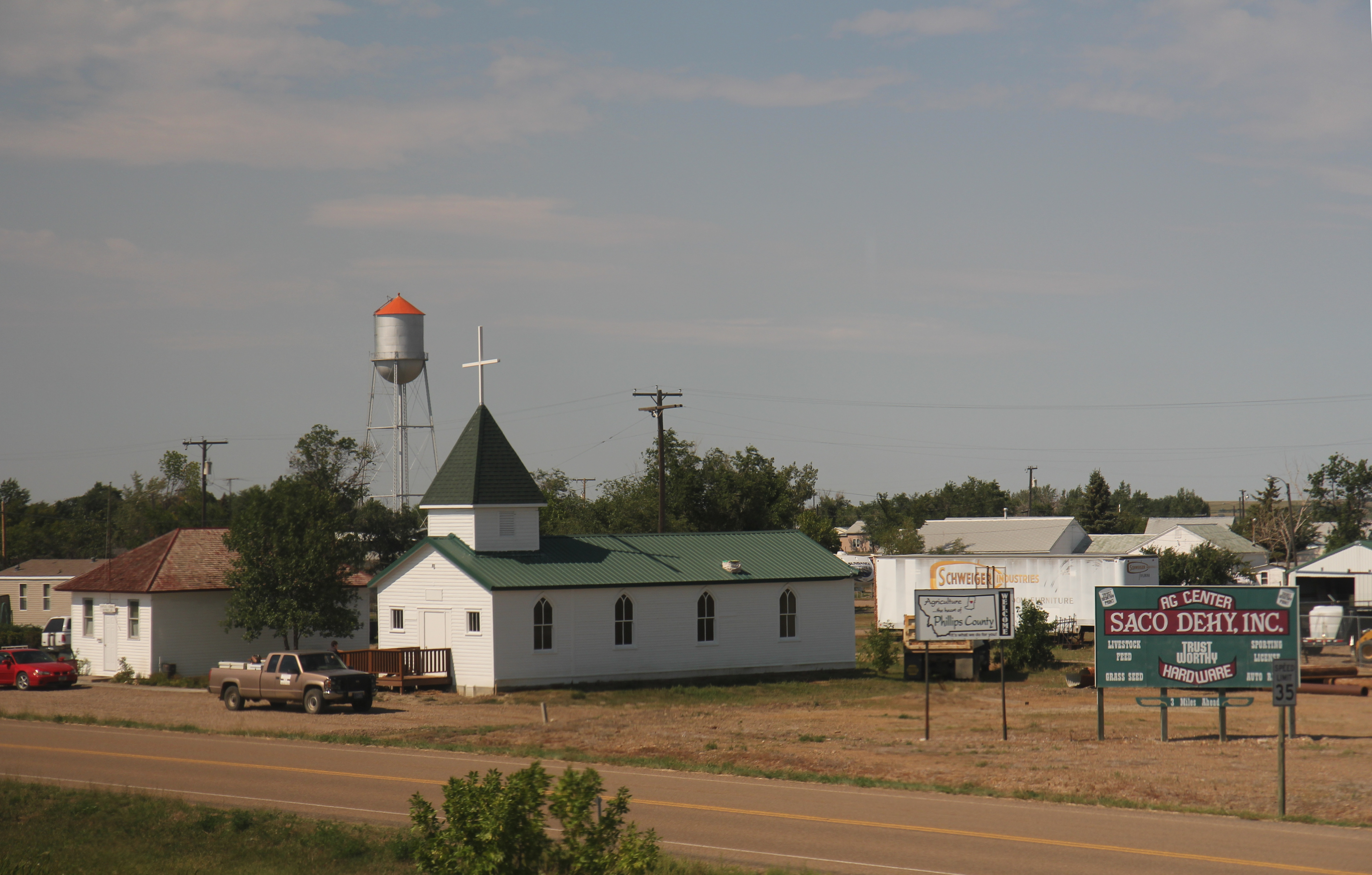
Church and water tower in Saco

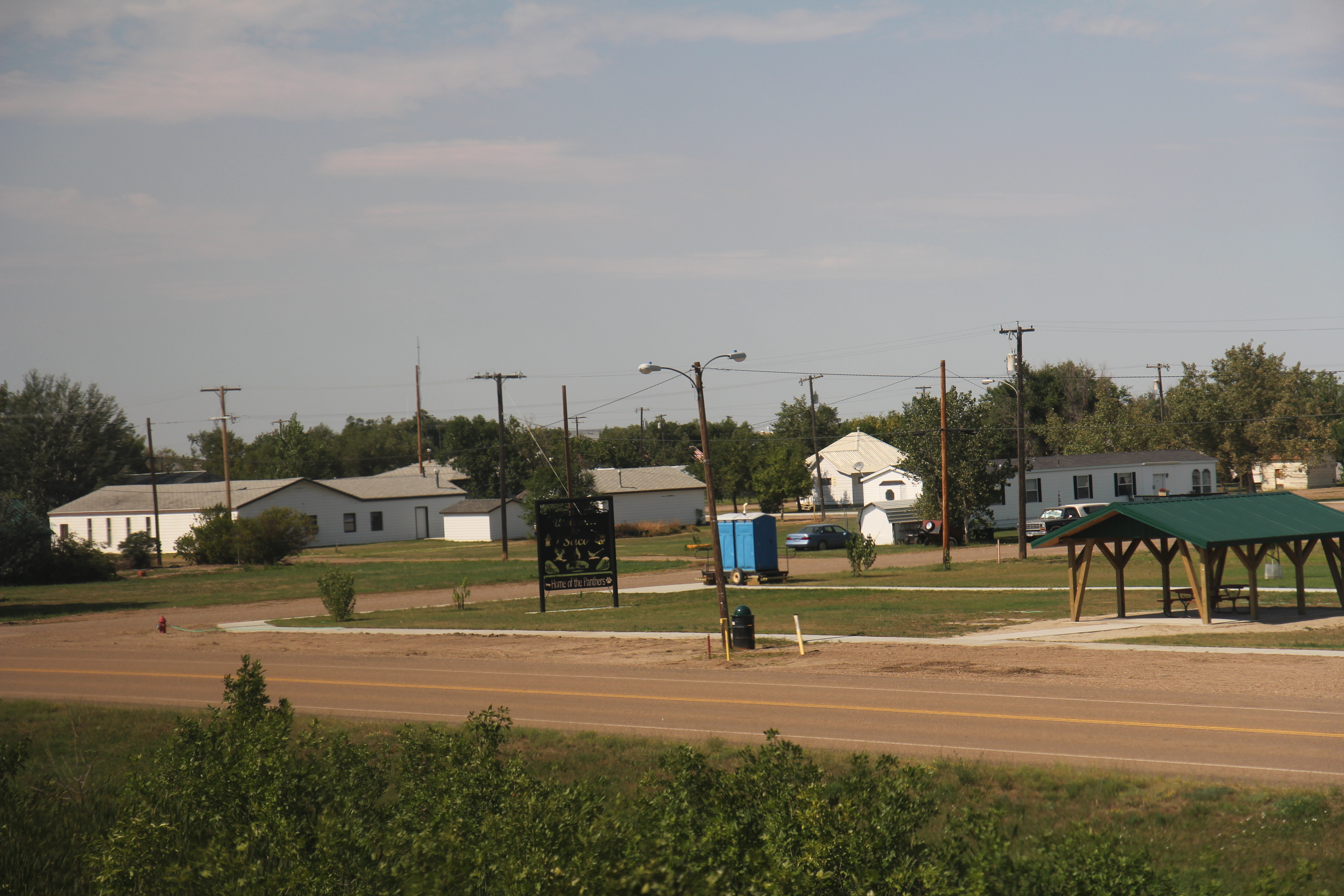
Park

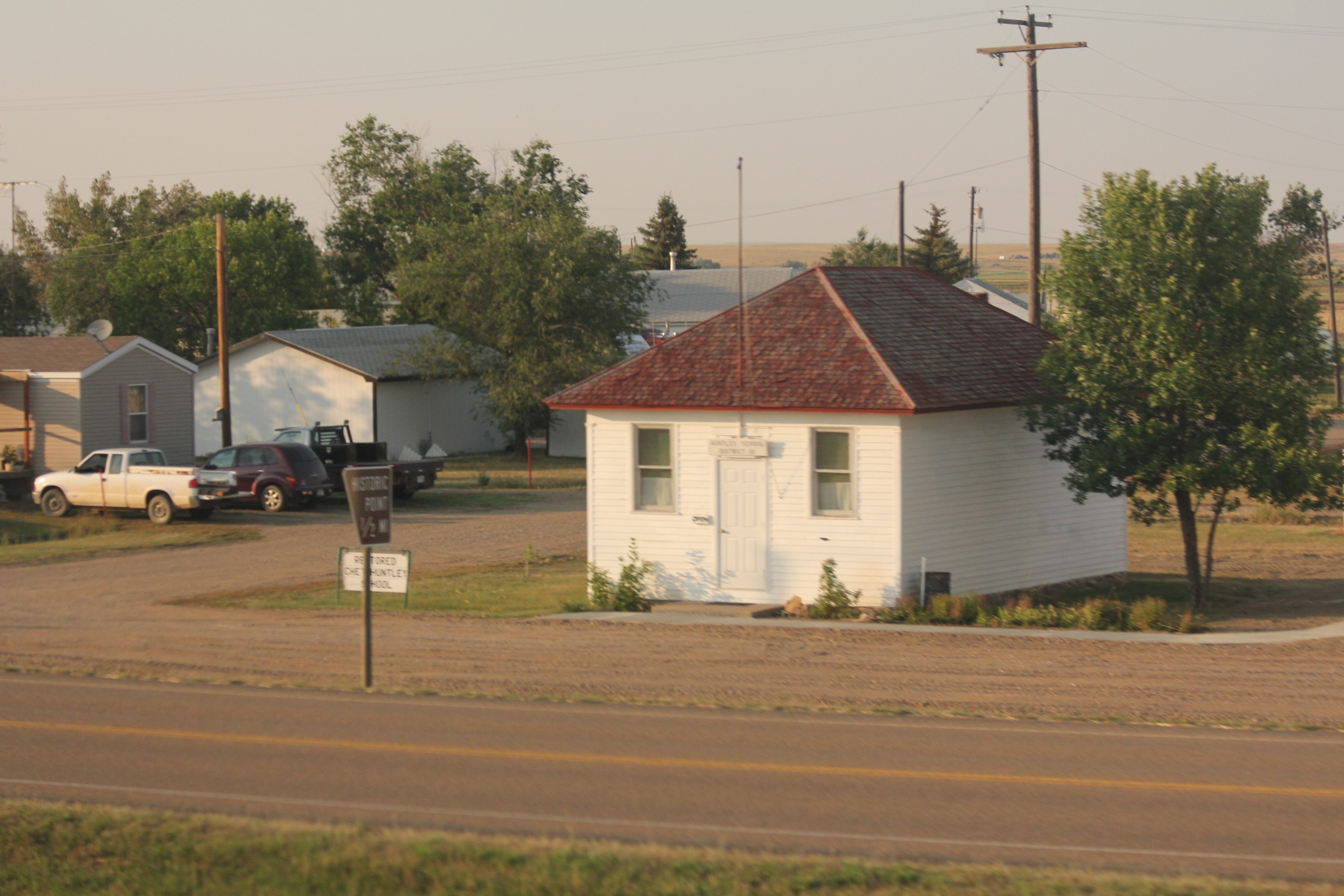
Chet Huntley School in Saco

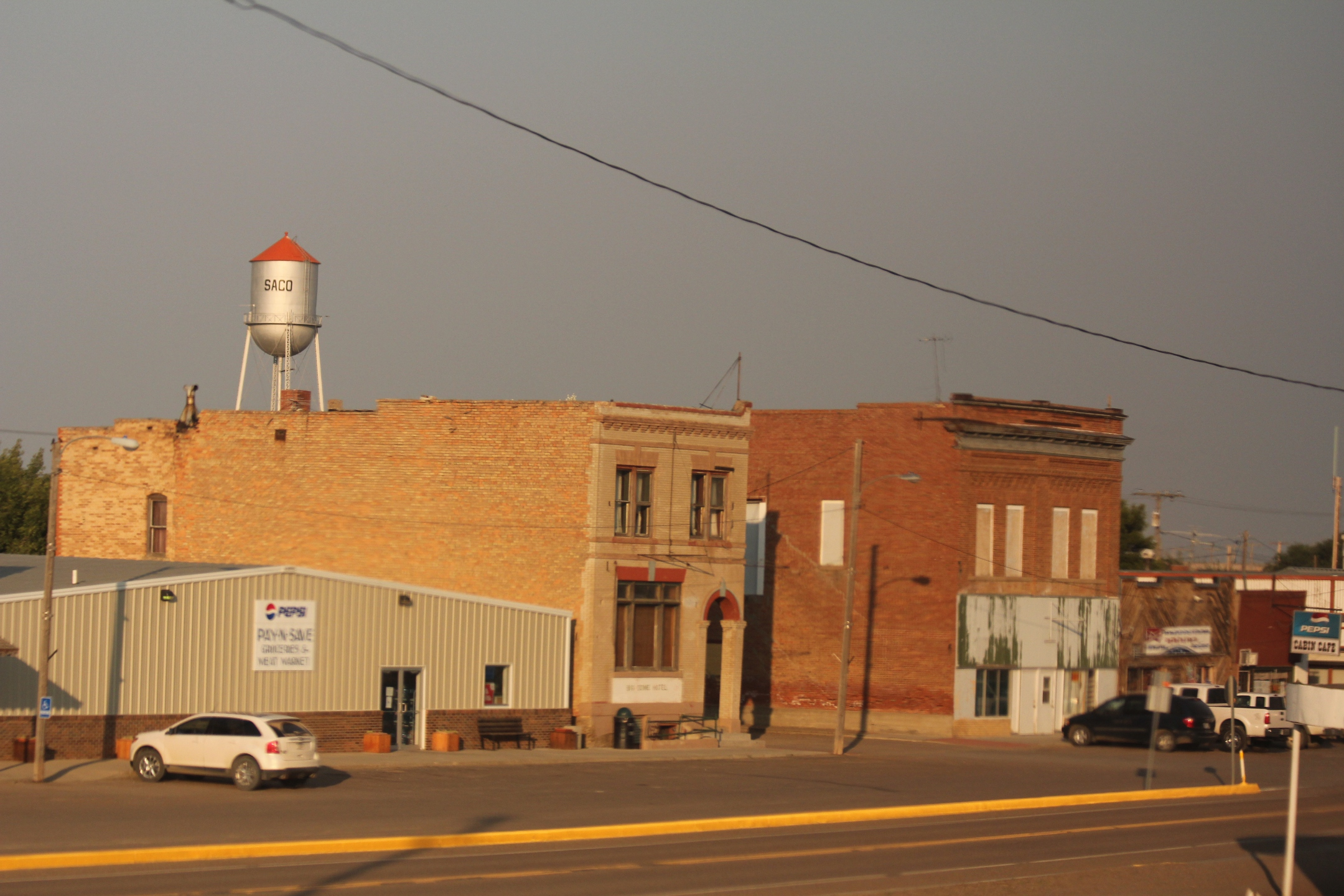
Water Tower overlooks downtown Saco

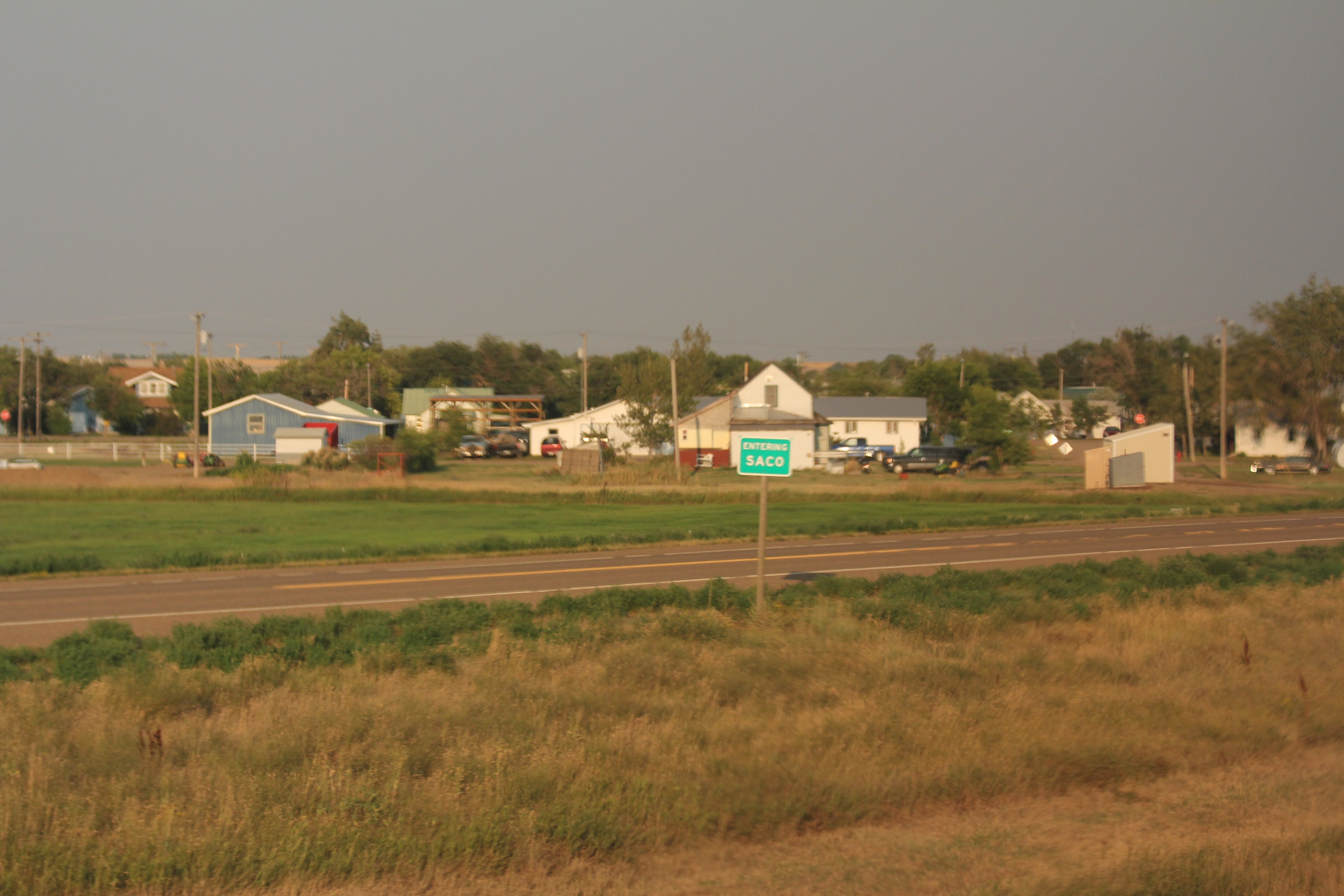
The sign for Saco looking east at U.S. Route 2
