= Pawsox Radio Network =

Former radio network of the Pawtucket Red Sox

- Type: Radio network
- Country: United States
- Availability: Regional, through 13 affiliates
- Owner: Larry Lucchino, Dr. Charles Steinberg, Mike Tamburro, and Co. (operated by Clear Channel Communications/WHJJ)
- Key people: Josh Maurer (announcer; 2014–2019)
- Official website: PawSox On the Air (archived)

The Pawsox Radio Network was the radio network of the Pawtucket Red Sox, a Triple-A minor league affiliate of the Boston Red Sox. There were 12 stations (nine AM and three FM) and three FM translators in the network, including the flagship and part-time stations. The network last broadcast games for the Pawtucket team in 2019, as the 2020 minor league season was cancelled and the team relocated to Worcester, Massachusetts, becoming the Worcester Red Sox for the 2021 season.

== Flagship station ==
- 920/WHJJ: Providence, Rhode Island

== Affiliates ==
=== Massachusetts (7 stations + 2 translators) ===
- 970/WESO: Southbridge (limited basis)
- 1280/WPKZ: Fitchburg
- 1340/WNBH: New Bedford
- 1480/WSAR: Fall River (Limited basis only when Boston Red Sox games are not on)
- 1490/WMRC: Milford (limited basis)
- 96.3/WEII: Dennis (limited basis)
- 98.9/WORC-FM: Webster
- 100.1/WWFX: Southbridge
- 105.3/W287BT: Fitchburg (relays WPKZ)

=== Rhode Island (1 station) ===
- 1230/WBLQ: Westerly (limited basis)

=== Vermont (2 station + 1 translator) ===
- 1320/WCVR: Randolph (limited basis)
- 1480/WCFR: Springfield (limited basis)
- 106.5/W293BH: Springfield (rebroadcasts WCFR)

== Unsure status (1 station) ==
- 1380/WNRI: Woonsocket, Rhode Island

== Former flagships (2 stations) ==
- 790/WSKO: Providence (????-200?)
- 99.7/WSKO-FM: Wakefield-Peacedale, Rhode Island

== Former affiliates (11 stations) ==
- 900/WGHM: Nashua, New Hampshire (????-2013)
- 1180/WCNX: Hope Valley, Rhode Island (200?-2008)
- 1240/WOON: Woonsocket, Rhode Island (1997)
- 1250/WGAM: Manchester, New Hampshire (????-2013)
- 1280/WEIM: Fitchburg, Massachusetts limited basis (2003)
- 1320/WARA: Attleboro, Massachusetts (1997)
- 1340/WGAW: Gardner, Massachusetts limited basis (????-2007)
- 1440/WVEI: Worcester, Massachusetts (????-2007)
- 1450/WLKW: West Warwick, Rhode Island (????-2008)
- 1570/WPEP: Taunton, Massachusetts (????-2003)
- 96.7/WBLQ-LP: Ashaway, Rhode Island (200?-200?)

== Alumni ==
Pawtucket served as a springboard for multiple Major League Baseball broadcasters. As of 2020, there were seven former PawSox radio and two television announcers broadcasting for Major League Baseball teams. In the below list, first are the years with the teams they have broadcast for, and second are the years the broadcaster was with the Pawtucket Red Sox.

- Gary Cohen (New York Mets) (1989–present); MLB on CBS Radio (1986, 1991–1997); MLB on ESPN Radio (1998–present); (1987–88)
- Dave Flemming (San Francisco Giants) (fill-in 2003, regular 2004–present) (2001–03)
- Andy Freed (Tampa Bay Rays) (2005–present) (2001–04)
- Dave Jageler (Washington Nationals) (2006–present) (2005)
- Don Orsillo (Boston Red Sox) (2001–2015); San Diego Padres (2016–present) (1996–2000)
- Glenn Geffner (Miami Marlins) (2008–2021); fill-in for San Diego Padres (1996–2002) and Boston Red Sox broadcaster (2005–07) (2006–07)
- Aaron Goldsmith (Seattle Mariners) (2013–present) (2012)
- Jeff Levering (Milwaukee Brewers) (2015–present) (2013–14)
- Josh Maurer (Milwaukee Brewers) (2022-) fill-in for Boston Red Sox (2015) fill in for Philadelphia Phillies (2021) (2014–2021)
- Will Flemming (Boston Red Sox) (2018–present) fill-in for Boston Red Sox (2018) (2015–2018)
- Mike Monaco (Boston Red Sox, ACC Network, ESPN) (2020–present) fill-in for Boston Red Sox (2019–present); with PawSox (2017–2019)

In addition, Dan Hoard became a broadcaster for the NFL's Cincinnati Bengals. He was with the PawSox from 2006 to 2011. On April 24, 2013, it was announced that then-broadcaster Bob Socci would become the New England Patriots play-by-play broadcaster starting with the 2013 season.

Other Pawtucket announcers included Bob Kurtz of the NHL's Minnesota Wild; Dave Shea, who spent time with the Washington Nationals; Bob Rodgers; Jack LeFaivre; Matt Pinto; and Mike Stenhouse.

== Sources ==
- 1997 Pawsox pocket schedule
- 2003 Pawsox pocket schedule
- 2008 Pawsox pocket schedule
- 2008 Pawsox official souvenir program, p. 165
- 2009 Pawsox pocket schedule
- 2009 Pawsox pocket schedule-Revised
- North East Radio Watch: April 6, 2009
- 2009 Pawsox official souvenir program, p. 189
- North East Radio Watch: April 5, 2010.
- 2012 Pawsox pocket schedule
