= 1250 AM =

AM radio frequency

The following radio stations broadcast on AM frequency 1250 kHz: 1250 AM is a Regional broadcast frequency.

== Argentina ==
- Estirpe Nacional in San Justo

== Canada ==
Call sign	City of license	Daytime power (kW)	Nighttime power (kW)	Transmitter coordinates
CHSM	Steinbach, Manitoba	10	10	49.504167°N 96.981944°W

== Mexico ==
- XEDK-AM in Guadalajara, Jalisco
- XETEJ-AM in Tejupilco, State of Mexico

== United States ==
Call sign	City of license	Facility ID	Class	Daytime power (kW)	Nighttime power (kW)	Transmitter coordinates
KBRF	Fergus Falls, Minnesota	21400	B	5	2.2	46.273333°N 96.045278°W (daytime); 46.274167°N 96.046111°W (nighttime)
KBTC	Houston, Missouri	65317	D	0.98	0.05	37.329167°N 91.898611°W
KCFI	Cedar Falls, Iowa	9726	B	0.5	0.5	42.544167°N 92.488056°W (daytime); 42.544722°N 92.487778°W (nighttime)
KCFM	Florence, Oregon	12138	D	0.9	0.037	44.029167°N 124.096944°W
KCUE	Red Wing, Minnesota	60855	D	1	0.11	44.537222°N 92.5225°W
KDEI	Port Arthur, Texas	20490	B	5	1	29.951111°N 93.879444°W
KHIL	Willcox, Arizona	72656	D	5	0.196	32.266667°N 109.832778°W
KHOT	Madera, California	39566	D	0.5	0.081	36.966111°N 120.035°W
KIKC	Forsyth, Montana	48301	D	5	0.132	46.258333°N 106.689167°W
KIKZ	Seminole, Texas	23018	B	1	0.25	32.699444°N 102.636667°W
KKDZ	Seattle, Washington	12112	B	5	5	47.563611°N 122.359722°W (daytime); 47.673056°N 122.168889°W (nighttime)
KLLK	Willits, California	65697	B	5	2.5	39.399444°N 123.322222°W
KNEU	Roosevelt, Utah	14062	D	5	0.129	40.286944°N 109.958889°W
KNWH	Yucca Valley, California	67028	D	0.8	0.077	34.130833°N 116.37°W
KPBI	Fayetteville, Arkansas	72491	D	0.92	0.045	36.040556°N 94.275556°W
KWSU	Pullman, Washington	71025	B	5	2.5	46.696389°N 117.245556°W
KYYS	Kansas City, Kansas	73938	B	25	3.7	39.185°N 94.457778°W
KZDC	San Antonio, Texas	65330	B	25	0.92	29.283611°N 98.474444°W (daytime); 29.496944°N 98.415833°W (nighttime)
KZER	Santa Barbara, California	3156	B	2.5	1	34.418333°N 119.818056°W
KZHN	Paris, Texas	71406	D	0.5	0.095	33.7225°N 95.547222°W
KZOI	Dakota City, Nebraska	17201	B	0.5	0.7	42.4425°N 96.261389°W
WARE	Ware, Massachusetts	70877	B	5	2.5	42.245278°N 72.208056°W
WBRM	Marion, North Carolina	71233	D	5	0.051	35.685556°N 82.034722°W
WCHO	Washington Court House, Ohio	57355	D	0.5	0.042	39.549722°N 83.452778°W
WDVA	Danville, Virginia	43244	B	5	5	36.581389°N 79.4425°W
WGAM	Manchester, New Hampshire	57088	D	0.67	0.1	43.010556°N 71.504167°W
WGHB	Farmville, North Carolina	56566	B	5	2.5	35.604722°N 77.574722°W
WGL	Fort Wayne, Indiana	22285	B	2.3	1	41.021111°N 85.162778°W
WHNZ	Tampa, Florida	23077	B	25	5.9	28.020556°N 82.609444°W
WJIT	Sabana, Puerto Rico	50276	B	0.25	1	18.426944°N 66.338889°W
WJMK	Bridgeport, Michigan	4600	B	5	1.1	43.341944°N 83.899167°W
WJZU	Franklin, Virginia	52368	D	1		36.6825°N 76.928611°W
WKBL	Covington, Tennessee	57887	D	0.8	0.08	35.586667°N 89.639167°W
WKDX	Hamlet, North Carolina	56324	D	1	0.08	34.885°N 79.680556°W
WLCK	Scottsville, Kentucky	60149	D	0.86	0.076	36.740278°N 86.175278°W
WLEM	Emporium, Pennsylvania	53581	D	2.5	0.03	41.506111°N 78.223889°W
WLRT	Nicholasville, Kentucky	36525	D	0.5	0.059	37.905°N 84.556944°W
WMTR	Morristown, New Jersey	49586	B	5	7	40.813056°N 74.462778°W
WPGP	Pittsburgh, Pennsylvania	65691	B	5	5	40.397222°N 79.961944°W
WQHL	Live Oak, Florida	15872	D	1	0.083	30.287222°N 82.965556°W
WRAY	Princeton, Indiana	53566	D	1	0.059	38.356944°N 87.590278°W
WRBZ	Wetumpka, Alabama	29343	D	1	0.08	32.485°N 86.206944°W
WRKQ	Madisonville, Tennessee	43522	D	0.5	0.084	35.508056°N 84.379167°W
WSRA	Albany, Georgia	37451	D	1	0.053	31.616667°N 84.158889°W
WSSP	Milwaukee, Wisconsin	27030	B	5	5	42.946111°N 88.060833°W
WTMA	Charleston, South Carolina	72376	B	5	1	32.824167°N 80.002778°W
WYKM	Rupert, West Virginia	46743	D	5		37.993056°N 80.684167°W
WYTH	Madison, Georgia	9884	D	1	0.079	33.579167°N 83.477778°W
WYYC	York, Pennsylvania	52172	D	1	0.033	39.998889°N 76.695278°W
WZOB	Fort Payne, Alabama	9797	D	5	0.122	34.439722°N 85.753333°W

== Uruguay ==
- CX 36 Radio Centenario in Montevideo
