= WATD =

WATD may refer to:

- WATD-FM, a radio station (95.9 FM) licensed to serve Marshfield, Massachusetts
- WBMS (AM), a radio station (1460 AM) licensed to serve Brockton, Massachusetts, United States, which held the call sign WATD from 2016 to 2019
- WZBR, a radio station (1410 AM) licensed to serve Dedham, Massachusetts, United States, which held the call sign WATD from 1985 to 1990
