= WZBR =

- Dedham, Massachusetts; United States
- Broadcast area: Greater Boston
- Frequency: 1410 kHz
- Branding: AM 1410 WZBR

Ownership
- Owner: Alexander Langer; (Langer Broadcasting Group, LLC)
- Sister stations: WSRO

History
- First air date: July 17, 1961
- Last air date: April 1, 2024
- Former call signs: WOKW (1961–1981); WAMK (1981–1985); WATD (1985–1990); WMSX (1990–2013)

Technical information
- Facility ID: 41348
- Class: D
- Power: 2,300 watts day; 25 watts night
- Transmitter coordinates: 42°14′5.36″N 71°8′11.19″W
- Translator: 98.1 W251CR (Medford)

WZBR (1410 AM) was a radio station licensed to Dedham, Massachusetts, United States. The station served the Greater Boston area. WZBR was owned by Langer Broadcasting Group, LLC, along with WSRO. WZBR also operated translator station W251CR (98.1 FM) in Medford.

The station went on the air in 1961 as WOKW in Brockton; the principals of founding owner Associated Broadcasters were associated with WSPR in Springfield. Following a series of ownership changes, the middle of the road station became WAMK in 1981, WATD—a sister station to WATD-FM in Marshfield—in 1985, and talk radio station WMSX in 1990. After operating as a Spanish-language tropical music station from 2001 to 2008 and a contemporary Christian music station from 2009 to 2012, WMSX was sold to Alex Langer in 2012. Langer moved the station to Dedham as WZBR in 2013, initially as part of his network of Portuguese language radio stations based at WSRO, and later leased out to the programmer of an urban contemporary format from 2016 to 2020. WZBR suspended operations for financial reasons in July 2020; it then operated as a jazz music station from November 2020 until Langer's death in March 2023. WZBR ceased operations entirely in 2024.

== History ==
Alan C. Tindal, Kristian Solberg, Paul Monson, and John J. Sullivan, doing business as Associated Broadcasters, applied to build a daytime-only radio station on 1410 kHz in Brockton, on October 9, 1957; Tindal and Solberg were part owners of WSPR in Springfield, and Monson and Sullivan were also associated with that station. Later that month, a second application for the frequency was filed by Simon Geller, proposing a station in Gloucester. The Federal Communications Commission (FCC) initiated comparative hearing proceedings in 1960; that August, Geller amended his application to instead operate on 1540 kHz, and Associated was granted a construction permit on November 22. The station, assigned the call sign WOKW, went on the air July 17, 1961, and was licensed on November 28. WOKW was affiliated with the Mutual Broadcasting System by 1968, and had a middle of the road format.

Sullivan, Tindal, and Solberg sold WOKW to Sidney and Arlene Sanft and Henrietta Masters for $350,000 in 1976; the new owners took over on February 7, 1977. Sanft, in turn, sold the station to Bay Colony Broadcasting—owned by New York literary agents Francis Greenburger, Edward F. Acton, and Dennis Holler—for $435,000 in 1981. Bay Colony changed the call sign to WAMK on September 28, 1981; following format changes, by December 1983 the station was promoting itself as "America's music from 1930 to today". That year, Bay Colony Broadcasting sold WAMK to Espirit Inc. for $210,000; principal Scott B. Davis was the president of Mobile Television Services, a television production company in Boston.

Davis's MTS Broadcasting Limited Partnership sold WAMK to Edward F. Perry and William C. Blackmore's Marshfield Broadcasting Company, owner of WATD-FM in Marshfield and WRTT in Vernon, Connecticut, in 1985. The call sign was changed to WATD, matching the Marshfield station, on December 15, 1985; it first changed to a big band format, and later simulcast the adult contemporary programming of WATD-FM.

Marshfield Broadcasting sold WATD (AM) to Metro South Broadcasting for $175,000 in 1989; principal Donald Sandler was the station's sales manager. Metro South changed the call sign to WMSX on April 1, 1990, and replaced the WATD-FM simulcast with a talk format. Sandler owned 51 percent of the station; minority stakes in WMSX were held by Edward Bowen, George Denham, and Malda Thompson, who would go own to also own stakes in WATD-FM's Cape Cod sister station, WATB. WMSX gained its own sister station in 1992, when Sandler's Metro South Broadcasting Network bought WCEG in Middleborough from Steven J. Callahan; it operated WCEG as a WMSX simulcast, and later as a Portuguese language station. WCEG went off the air in September 1993, and was sold back to Callahan in 1996.

Metro South Broadcasting attempted to sell WMSX to Griot Communications, owned by former WILD general manager Monte Bowens, for $410,000 in 1998. The sale fell through; the following year, the station was instead sold to Keating Willcox's Willow Farm Inc., for $647,000. Willow Farm sold most of its stations—WMSX; WGAW in Gardner; WPEP in Taunton; WMVU in Nashua, New Hampshire; and WNRI in Woonsocket, Rhode Island—to Anastos Media Group, controlled by New York City television news anchor Ernie Anastos, for $2.1 million in 2001. Willcox, who retained WNSH in Beverly, sold the stations due to health problems.

In November 2001, WMSX dropped its talk programming for Spanish-language programming as "La Super X", with a tropical music format. Hispanic Broadcasters, controlled by Antonio Molina, bought the station for $1.43 million in 2004; after defaulting on a loan, the company's lenders took over WMSX in 2008. The Hispanic Broadcasting Asset Trust took the station silent on December 1, 2008, ahead of a sale to Kingdom Church for $540,000. After the church took control on February 5, 2009, WMSX returned to the air April 13; it played contemporary Christian music as "Power 1410".

Alex Langer, owner of Framingham-area Portuguese language station WSRO, bought WMSX from Kingdom Church for $100,000 in 2012; by that September, the station had gone silent following the end of its transmitter site lease. On June 10, 2013, WMSX filed an application to move from Brockton to Dedham, with a transmitter in the Hyde Park neighborhood of Boston. Langer soon announced his intention to use the station as a Boston extension of WSRO, with its own studios in Hyde Park. Langer signed the station on from its new site on the Hyde Park-Dedham border on October 23, 2013, testing with jazz music. The station transmitted from a small Valcom fiberglass antenna next to the river; the antenna was previously used a decade earlier (in a different location) by Langer's original WSRO (prior to its own move into the Boston area as WAZN), and had to be cleaned up after a decade of disuse. On November 12, 2013, the station changed its call sign to WZBR.

Logo as Rebe ABR

In early 2014, WZBR began simulcasting WSRO; the jazz programming was moved to Langer's newly acquired Cape Cod station, WBAS, ahead of that station joining the WSRO simulcast as well. WZBR's new facility was licensed on February 11, 2014. In December 2014, WZBR and WBAS began carrying some separate programming from WSRO; by 2015, the three stations were jointly branded as "Rede ABR".

On February 3, 2016, WZBR dropped the Portuguese programming and launched an urban contemporary format, known as "The Bass of Boston". The new format, whose studios were located near Dudley Square, was operated by Frank Holder and programmed by Steve Gousby, both of whom had previously been associated with Boston's longtime Black-oriented station, WILD. In September 2016, New Edition lead singer Ralph Tresvant launched his Friday afternoon, radio show "Inside The Ride" on WZBR. In 2018, the station rebranded as "98.1 The Urban Heat" to reflect the sign-on of its FM translator.

Langer Broadcasting took WZBR and its translator silent in mid-July 2020, due to financial difficulties; the shutdown was concurrent with the suspension of operations of WSRO and WBAS, which had continued with the "Rede ABR" Portuguese programming. The "Urban Heat" programming continues to be available online. WZBR resumed broadcasting on November 4, 2020. As of December 2021, WZBR served as an analog simulcast of WSRO, which had converted to digital-only operation on December 1, and was programming jazz music; after WSRO switched to classical music in 2022, the jazz programming remained on WZBR.

WZBR again went silent on March 5, 2023; the shutdown of WSRO and WZBR followed the death of Alex Langer. Both stations had been put up for sale prior to his death; WBAS had already been sold off in 2021. WZBR returned to the air in March 2024 from a 10-watt facility on Great Blue Hill under special temporary authority; it went silent on April 1 following technical problems. The FCC cancelled the station's license on May 2, 2024, following a request by Langer Broadcasting; the license for translator W251CR was concurrently surrendered.

== FM translator ==
Broadcast translator for WZBR
Call sign	Frequency	City of license	FID	ERP (W)	Class	Transmitter coordinates	FCC info
W251CR	98.1 FM	Medford, Massachusetts	201029	130	D	42°25′52.3″N 71°5′17.2″W	LMS
