= Boston Bruins Radio Network =

American sports radio network

The Boston Bruins Radio Network is a 17-station (9 AM, 9 FM, plus 3 FM translators) network which carries live game broadcasts of the Boston Bruins. The network's flagship station is WBZ-FM (98.5) in Boston, Massachusetts. Ryan Johnston announces play-by-play. Bob Beers provides color commentary.

== Network stations (20 stations) ==
=== Flagship (1 station) ===
- WBZ-FM 98.5: Boston (2009–present)

=== Affiliates (19 stations) ===
==== Maine (3 stations) ====
- WEZQ 92.9: Bangor (2012–present)
- WEZR 780: Rumford
- WHXR 106.3: Scarborough

==== Massachusetts (7 stations + 2 FM translators) ====
- WBEC 1420: Pittsfield
- WVEI 1440: Worcester
- WMRC 1490: Milford
- WNAW 1230: North Adams (2012–present)
- WPKZ 1280: Fitchburg (2011–present)
- WXTK 95.1: West Yarmouth/Cape Cod (2011–present)
- WWEI 105.5: Easthampton
- W267CD 101.3: Milford (rebroadcasts WMRC)
- W287BT 105.3: Fitchburg (rebroadcasts WPKZ)

==== New Hampshire (4 stations + 1 FM translator) ====
- WEEY 93.5: Swanzey (2012–present)
- WTPL 107.7: Hillsborough
- WTSN 1270: Dover (2015–present)
- WWLK-FM 101.5: Meredith
- W251CF 98.1: Dover (rebroadcasts WTSN)

==== New York (2 stations) ====
- WCPV 101.3: Essex (2011–present)
- WEAV 960: Plattsburgh

==== Rhode Island (1 station) ====
- WOON 1240: Woonsocket (2010–present)

==== Vermont (1 station + 1 FM translator ====
- WCFR 1320: Springfield, Vermont
- W293BH 106.5 (relays WCFR)

== Former flagships (7 stations) ==
- WBZ 1030: Boston (1924-1929; 1969-1978; 1995-2009; also simulcast Game 7 of the 2011 Stanley Cup Finals)
- WBNW 590: Boston (1990-1995; now WEZE; station was known as WEEI from 1990 to 1994)
- WPLM-FM 99.1: Plymouth, Massachusetts (1982-1990)
- WITS 1510: Boston (1978-1982; now WMEX)
- WHDH 850: Boston (1946-1969; now WEEI)
- WNAC 1230 (until March 29, 1941); 1260 (after March 29, 1941): Boston (1929-1935; 1942-1946; now WBIX)
- WAAB 1410 (until March 29, 1941); 1440 (after March 29, 1941): Boston (1935-1942; now WVEI in Worcester)

== Former affiliates (30 stations) ==
- WARA 1320: Attleboro, Massachusetts (1990-1991)
- WBAE 1490: Portland, Maine (regular season)
- WBCQ-FM 94.7: Monticello, Maine (2012-?)
- WBET 1460 Brockton, Massachusetts (1978-1990; now WBMS)
- WBSM 1420: New Bedford, Massachusetts (2010–20??)
- WCME 900: Brunswick, Maine (2013–?)
- WEAN-FM 99.7: Wakefield-Peacedale, Rhode Island (2013 Stanley Cup Championship only)
- WGAM 1250: Manchester, New Hampshire
- WGAW 1340: Gardner, Massachusetts (2011-2012 season)
- WGHM 900: Nashua, New Hampshire
- WHLL 1450: Springfield, Massachusetts
- WLYT 92.5 Haverhill, Massachusetts (1978-1990; now WXRV; station was known as WHAV-FM from 1978 to 1982)
- WMYF 1380: Portsmouth, New Hampshire (2012-2015; now defunct)
- WMEX 106.5: Farmington, New Hampshire (????-2008; now WNHI, part of the Air 1 satellite network)
- WOXO-FM 92.7: Norway, Maine (2012-?)
- WPRO 630: Providence, Rhode Island (2013 Stanley Cup Championship only)
- WPRV 790: Providence, Rhode Island (2011-2013)
- WSAR 1480: Fall River, Massachusetts
- WSMN 1590: Nashua, New Hampshire (2012–?)
- WSNO 1450: Barre, Vermont
- WTBM 100.7: Mexico, Maine (now WIGY-FM)
- WTSL 1400: Hanover, New Hampshire (2012–?)
- WTSV 1230: Claremont, New Hampshire (2012–?)
- WVAE 1400: Biddeford, Maine
- WVEI-FM 103.7 Westerly (2014–2026)
- WVMT 620 Burlington, Vermont (2010-2011)
- WWOD 93.9: Woodstock, Vermont (?-2012)
- WWON 1240: Woonsocket, Rhode Island (1984–1985; now WOON)
- WZAN 970: Portland, Maine (?-2012; Playoffs only)
- WZON 620: Bangor, Maine (?-2012)
