= Boston Celtics Radio Network =

NBA team radio network

The Boston Celtics Radio Network is a radio network that broadcasts Boston Celtics basketball games with a flagship station of WBZ-FM (98.5). Carried in 5 of the 6 New England states, the network has 27 stations (17 on AM, 10 on FM, plus 4 FM translators).

Certain of these stations, including flagship WBZ-FM, also have commitments to carry games of the New England Patriots (football) and Boston Bruins (hockey), and Celtics games may be pre-empted.

From 2005 until 2013, Celtics games had been carried on Entercom-owned stations WRKO and WEEI. That partnership ended in August 2013. In September 2013, the Celtics announced that they had signed a multi-year deal with CBS Radio to broadcast games on their stations. CBS Radio and Entercom merged in 2017; WBZ-FM, and the Celtics contract, was spun out to Beasley Broadcast Group shortly thereafter due to market concentration concerns.

== Radio Network ==
=== Flagship ===
- 98.5 WBZ-FM: Boston

=== Affiliates ===
==== Maine (6 stations) ====
- 92.9 WEZQ: Bangor Boston Bruins primary affiliate
- 96.3 WJJB-FM: Gray
- 1310 WLOB: Portland
- 95.9 WPEI: Saco
- 95.5 WPPI: Topsham
- 1440 WRED: Westbrook

==== Massachusetts (7 stations + 1 FM translator) ====
- 105.5 WWEI: Easthampton
- 1400 WHTB: Fall River (if there is a conflict on WSAR)
- 1480 WSAR: Fall River
- 1280 WPKZ: Fitchburg
  - 105.3/W287BT: Fitchburg (translator of WPKZ)
- 1230 WNAW: North Adams Boston Bruins primary affiliate
- 95.1 WXTK: West Yarmouth Boston Bruins primary affiliate
- 1440 WVEI: Worcester

==== New Hampshire (8 stations + 3 FM translators) ====
- 1230 WTSV: Claremont Boston Bruins primary affiliate
- 1450 WKXL: Concord
  - 101.9/W270DS: Concord (translator of WKXL)
  - 103.9/W280EC: Concord (translator of WKXL)
- 1270 WTSN: Dover
  - 98.1/W251CF: Dover (translator of WTSN)
- 1400 WTSL: Hanover Boston Bruins primary affiliate
- 1250 WGAM: Manchester
- 101.5 WWLK-FM: Meredith Boston Bruins primary affiliate
- 900 WGHM: Nashua
- 93.5 WEEY: Swanzey Boston Bruins primary affiliate

==== New York (2 stations) ====
- 101.3 WCPV: Essex
- 960 WEAV: Plattsburgh

==== Rhode Island (2 stations) ====
- 790 WPRV: Providence (2018-)
- 1240 WOON: Woonsocket (2009, 2014-)

== Former stations (24 stations + 1 FM translator) ==
=== Former flagships (7 stations) ===
- 680 WRKO: Boston, Massachusetts (1981–1991, 1995–1996, 2005–2007)
- 590 WEEI Boston, Massachusetts (1991–1995)
- 850 WHDH: Boston, Massachusetts (co-flagship, 1952–1969)
- 850 WEEI: Boston, Massachusetts (2007–2013)
- 1510 WWZN: Boston, Massachusetts (2001–2005)
- 93.7 WEEI-FM: Lawrence, Massachusetts (2011–2013)
- 94.5 WHDH-FM: Boston, Massachusetts (co-flagship, 1952–1969; sometimes carried Celtics games alone when WHDH was carrying a game of the Boston Bruins hockey club))

=== Former affiliates (17 stations + 1 FM translator) ===
- 620 WZON: Bangor, Maine
- 1280 WFAU: Gardiner, Maine
- 1450 WVOM: Rockland, Maine
- 1440 WRED: Westbrook, Maine
- 1320 WARA: Attleboro, Massachusetts (1990–1991, 2005–2006 season (as WARL))
- 104.9 WBOQ: Gloucester, Massachusetts
- 1420 WBSM: New Bedford, Massachusetts
- 560 WHYN: Springfield, Massachusetts
- 580 WTAG: Worcester, Massachusetts
  - 94.9/W235AV: Tatnuck (translator of WTAG)
- 107.7 WTPL: Hillsborough
- 1420 WASR: Wolfeboro, New Hampshire
- 1540 WPTR: Albany
- 920 WHJJ: Providence, Rhode Island (2015–2018)
- 620 WVMT: Burlington, Vermont
- 1240 WSKI: Montpelier, Vermont
- 550 WDEV: Waterbury, Vermont
- 96.1 WDEV-FM: Warren, Vermont
- 93.9 WWOD: Woodstock, Vermont
