= WQVD =

Simulcast of WQVR, Webster
- Orange–Athol, Massachusetts; United States
- Broadcast area: Quabbin–Swift River Valley
- Frequency: 700 kHz

Programming
- Format: Classic hits

Ownership
- Owner: Kurt Jackson; (Hampden Communications Co)
- Sister stations: WQVR; WARE; WATR

History
- First air date: May 13, 1956
- Former call signs: WCAT (1956–1987); WPNS (1987–1988); WCAT (1988–2005); WJOE (2005–2009); WVBB (2009); WTUB (2009–2014); WWBZ (2014); WFAT (2014–2019); WPVQ (2019–2023)
- Former frequencies: 1390 kHz (1956–1983)
- Call sign meaning: Disambiguation of WQVR

Technical information
- Licensing authority: FCC
- Facility ID: 51118
- Class: D
- Power: 2,500 watts day
- Transmitter coordinates: 42°35′5.31″N 72°16′50.3″W

Links
- Public license information: Public file; LMS
- Webcast: Listen live
- Website: wqvrradio.com

WQVD (700 AM) is a radio station licensed to serve Orange–Athol, Massachusetts, United States. The station is owned by Kurt Jackson's Hampden Communications Co. It simulcasts the classic hits format of commonly-owned WQVR in Webster.

== History ==
WQVD signed on May 13, 1956, as WCAT, operating on 1390 AM. Original owner Miller's River Broadcasting sold the station to Tri-State Radio in 1960, who in turn sold it to Berkshire Broadcasting in 1969. By 1971, the station had a middle-of-the-road format, which it would retain into the 1980s, as the station was sold to P&S Broadcasting in 1975.

In 1983, WCAT moved to its current position on 700. The station changed its call sign to WPNS, reflecting its ownership, in 1987; after just over a year, however, the station reverted to WCAT. WCAT subsequently discontinued locally originated programming; by 1996, the station was a talk radio station, affiliated with the Talk America network. An FM sister station on 99.9 FM (now WKMY) was launched on December 4, 1989.

In 1998, P&S sold WCAT and WCAT-FM to CAT Communications Corporation (a company controlled by Jeff Shapiro), who in turn sold the stations to Citadel Broadcasting in 2000. Citadel operated WCAT-AM-FM as part of its Worcester group of stations, even though Arbitron considered the stations to be within the Boston market. Several months after Citadel took over, WCAT went silent while its tower was replaced, putting the station in danger of having its license canceled by the Federal Communications Commission (FCC) for failing to broadcast for a year; when it returned in late October 2001, just before its November 1 deadline to do so, it simulcast the oldies format of WCAT-FM. By the following year, WCAT had been leased out to a Spanish language operator that implemented a religious format.

The station's logo as an ESPN Radio affiliate, used from January 2, 2008, until late 2011.

Citadel sold WCAT and its FM sister station, by then WAHL, to Northeast Broadcasting, controlled by Steve Silberberg, in 2003. Silberberg subsequently purchased WGAW (1340 AM) in nearby Gardner, and in 2004, WCAT began simulcasting its talk format. The station was renamed WJOE in 2005; it subsequently resumed separate programming, and after a stint as an oldies station, WJOE joined ESPN Radio on January 2, 2008.

WJOE was to switch to a Brazilian format on March 16, 2009; this format was to be programmed by Langer Broadcasting Group as a sister station to WSRO. However, this format change did not occur, and the station remained with ESPN Radio.

On September 2, 2009, WJOE swapped callsigns with WVBB (106.3 FM) in Columbia City, Indiana, which desired the WJOE call sign to match its "Joe FM" branding. Nine days later, the call sign was changed again, this time to WTUB. The station dropped ESPN Radio in late 2011 and returned to simulcasting its FM sister station, by then WXRG, which at that time was itself rebroadcasting adult album alternative sister station WXRV from Andover.

Logo used from June 2014 until January 10, 2019, as "The Big 700 WFAT".

The station's call sign was changed to WWBZ on April 30, 2014. WWBZ and what had become WFNX dropped the WXRV simulcast in May 2014 and began stunting with a wide range of music while preparing to launch new formats for the stations on June 9, with listeners being asked to vote on which of the songs being played should be included in the new formats. At the end of the stunting, WWBZ dropped the simulcast with WFNX (which continued with a variety hits format) and introduced an oldies format. During its first day with the format, the station referred to itself as "Legends 700 WBZ" despite not being associated with Boston radio station WBZ (1030 AM), whose signal reaches the Orange-Athol area; on June 10, the branding was amended to feature the full WWBZ call sign. The station subsequently rebranded as simply "AM Radio 700" after WBZ's owner, CBS Radio, objected to the WWBZ call sign as an infringement of its trademark for WBZ, as well as a separate trademark infringement dispute with the owners of WNBP in Newburyport over the "Legends" branding. WWBZ then announced its intention to introduce a new branding and call sign; on September 1, 2014, it took the WFAT call sign.

Following a lack of success at attracting advertisers, in May 2016, WFAT announced that it would end its oldies format after May 29 and return to simulcasting WXRV, concurrently with sister station WFNX; in its announcement, WFAT said it needed ten businesses to advertise on the station on an annual basis to cover its costs. Despite the announcement, WFAT continued to broadcast the oldies format until 2019. In June 2016, WFAT acquired the construction permit for FM translator W226BX (93.5) in Hanover, New Hampshire, from Vermont Public Radio, with the intention of relocating it to the Orange–Athol area as W222CH (92.3).

Saga Communications agreed to acquire WFAT for $210,000 in September 2018. The purchase was consummated on January 4, 2019, at which point Saga changed the station's call sign to WPVQ, shared with existing Saga-owned country music station WPVQ-FM 95.3. On January 10, 2019, Saga relaunched the station as "92.3 The Outlaw" (reflecting the FM translator), with a classic country format.

Saga Communications filed to sell WPVQ to Kurt Jackson's Hampden Communications for $2,000 in November 2022; as part of the deal, Hampden agreed to remove equipment from an auxiliary tower that was being vacated by Saga-owned WRSI. Ahead of the sale, the HD3 channel of WPVQ-FM became the primary station for W222CH and the "92.3 The Outlaw" programming. The sale was completed on February 28, 2023, at which time WPVQ went silent. In connection with the sale, the station changed its call sign to WQVD on March 5, 2023.
