= WPEP =

- Taunton, Massachusetts; United States
- Frequency: 1570 kHz

Programming
- Affiliations: ABC Radio Networks; Talk Radio Network; USA Radio Network; Westwood One; Boston Red Sox Radio Network (2004–2005); Pawsox Radio Network (????-2003)

Ownership
- Owner: Ernie Anastos; (Anastos Media Group, Inc.)

History
- First air date: December 22, 1949
- Last air date: October 18, 2007
- Former call signs: WTRN (never used on air)

Technical information
- Licensing authority: FCC
- Facility ID: 61601
- Class: B
- Power: 1,000 watts (day); 227.4 watts (night)
- Transmitter coordinates: 41°53′0.4″N 71°3′48.2″W

Links
- Public license information: Public file; LMS
- Website: wpep1570.com via Internet Archive

WPEP (1570 kHz) was an AM radio station licensed to Taunton, Massachusetts. WPEP's format had been full-service, offering local news and talk programming, as well as music and nationally syndicated talk. The station was last owned by Ernie Anastos' Anastos Media Group, and operated from 1949 to 2007.

== History ==
In late 1948, Silver City Broadcasting Corp., owned by businessman John McGregor, applied for and was granted a construction permit for an AM broadcast station in Taunton. The station's callsign was originally to be WTRN, however the call sign was changed to WPEP before the station officially signed on the air December 22, 1949. When WPEP signed on, its studio was located atop the Roseland Ballroom, north of downtown Taunton. The original format is believed to have been all local programming. WPEP was a 1 kilowatt daytime-only station from 1949 to 1970. This meant that WPEP was required to cease transmitting from sunset to sunrise. WPEP's transmitter site was 760 County Street in Taunton, Massachusetts.

On November 27, 1970, WPEP received pre-sunrise authority, allowing it to sign on at 6:00 am with a power of 350 watts, which could be upped to the full kilowatt at sunrise (during months when sunrise occurs later than 6:00 am). News director at the time was John P. Shaw. Daytime-only status lasted until September 1, 1986, when WPEP was granted nighttime authorization, which allowed WPEP to transmit 227.4 watts of power.

WPEP was sold in 1997 by Silver City Broadcasting to J. Keating Willcox's Willow Farm Broadcasting. Willow Farm sold most of its stations—WPEP; WMSX in Brockton; WGAW in Gardner; WMVU in Nashua, New Hampshire; and WNRI in Woonsocket, Rhode Island—to Anastos Media Group, controlled by New York City television news anchor Ernie Anastos, for $2.1 million in 2001. Willcox, who retained WNSH in Beverly, sold the stations due to health problems. Paul Giammarco was named general manager in 2002 until he left for WSAR in 2003. After Giammarco left, staffer A.J. Nicholson was promoted to general manager.

In 2004, WPEP added the Boston Red Sox Radio Network and carried the team's 2004 World Series victory. It was an affiliate in 2005 as well but station management had changed that March and did not air games. A May 5, 2005, article in the Taunton Daily Gazette said that the station was in jeopardy because WNSH (on the same frequency) got approval from the Federal Communications Commission (FCC) to increase its daytime power. When Willcox sold WPEP to Anastos Media, there was an informal agreement that Anastos Media would turn in the station's license to allow WNSH to upgrade, contingent on the power increase being granted by the FCC. The city's mayor and U.S. Representative filed objections; however, the station's general manager at the time publicly dismissed the possibility the station may go dark. On December 5, 2005, Anastos Media filed a renewal of the WPEP license. The renewal was granted by the FCC on March 28, 2006. WPEP's license was turned in to the FCC on October 18, 2007.

== Auxiliary licenses ==
- KRN297: a Remote pickup unit (RPU) on 161.64 MHz/161.67 MHz.
- WLI832: a Studio-transmitter link (STL) on 948 MHz.

== See also ==
- Taunton, Massachusetts
