= National Radio Network =

National Radio Network may refer to:

- National Radio Network (United States) in the United States
- National Radio Network (Japan) in Japan
- National Radio Network (UK) in the United Kingdom

== See also ==
- NRN (disambiguation)
