= WCTF =

- Vernon, Connecticut; United States
- Broadcast area: Hartford, Connecticut
- Frequency: 1170 kHz

Ownership
- Owner: Family Radio; (Loam Media, Inc.)

History
- First air date: November 21, 1982
- Last air date: April 9, 2025
- Former call signs: WRTT (1979–1986)
- Call sign meaning: "Connecticut Family Radio"

Technical information
- Licensing authority: FCC
- Facility ID: 20826
- Class: D
- Power: 1,000 watts (day); 500 watts (critical hours)
- Transmitter coordinates: 41°52′7.35″N 72°29′2.31″W

Links
- Public license information: Public file; LMS

WCTF (1170 AM) was a radio station owned by Loam Media, Inc., parent of the Family Radio network, and located in Vernon, Connecticut. The station operated during the daytime with 1,000 watts of power and 500 watts during critical hours, using a two-tower directional antenna system. It went on the air in 1982 as WRTT, offering local programming and oldies for the Vernon area, and was acquired by Family Stations (forerunner of Loam Media), becoming WCTF, in 1986. The station left the air in 2025, after technical and financial issues dating to 2024.

== History ==
On May 24, 1979, the Federal Communications Commission (FCC) granted a construction permit to Tolland County Broadcasting, Inc., for a new daytime-only radio station on 1170 kHz in Vernon. The company was owned by Massachusetts interests: Edward F. Perry Jr., an engineering and sales consultant and owner of WATD-FM in Marshfield and WGFP in Webster, owned 80 percent of the station, while 10 percent stakes were held by Bruce Blanchard, general manager of WTCC in Springfield, and Albert C. Pryor III, a Massachusetts legislative aide. The firm's efforts were troubled by delays obtaining a site. Taking the call letters WRTT for "Radio Tri-Town", the station did not begin broadcasting until November 21, 1982, operating from studios in Rockville with programming of interest for listeners in and near Vernon.

By the time of a planned $250,000 sale to Radio-Television-Tele-Communications Inc.—controlled by WRTT general manager Lee R. Tyrol—in 1984, 20 percent of the station was owned by WGGB-TV program director Tom Schnyt, with Edward Perry's interest reduced to 70 percent and Bruce Blanchard keeping his 10 percent stake. The outlet went silent on June 14, 1985, after the station's antenna was damaged by a lightning strike; Perry announced that WRTT would not return to the air until the completion of a planned sale of the station, but would not comment on reports that the new owners would replace its oldies format with religious programming beyond hinting that "listeners will be pleasantly surprised by the change in format". Perry filed to sell the station to Oakland, California–based Family Stations that September for $136,900, with the transaction finalized in January 1986. (Note: In 2024, the California-based Family Stations was reorganized; its assets were transferred to a new Tennessee-based entity, Loam Media, with no change in ownership or management.) By 2011, WCTF was one of 50 stations Family Stations operated as part of its Family Radio network.

WCTF closed on April 9, 2025, following transmitter problems that Loam Media attributed to the earlier failure of its air conditioning unit and the financial costs of replacing it. The failure had resulted in interruptions in the station's operations as early as August 2024. The FCC cancelled the WCTF license on August 14, 2026.
