= Wazn =

Wazn may refer to:

- A pattern or cycle of rhythm in Arabian music
- The traditional Arabic name for the star Beta Columbae
- WAZN, a Massachusetts AM radio station
