= Rick Rizzs =

American sportscaster (born 1953)

- Born: November 17, 1953 (age 72); Blue Island, Illinois, U.S.
- Education: Southern Illinois University
- Sports commentary career
- Team(s): Seattle Mariners (1983–1991, 1995–2026); Detroit Tigers (1992–1994); Ohio State football (1981–1982)
- Genre: Play-by-play
- Sport: Baseball

Richard Alfred Rizzs (RIZ; born November 17, 1953) is an American former sportscaster primarily for the Seattle Mariners of Major League Baseball. Spanning 41 seasons from 1983 to 2026, he is the longest-tenured broadcaster in franchise history, working alongside broadcasters Dave Niehaus, Dave Sims, Aaron Goldsmith, and many color commentators while serving as the radio announcer for his last 16 seasons. Rizzs will be inducted into the Mariners Hall of Fame in 2027. He also was a broadcaster for the Detroit Tigers from 1992 to 1994 and some Ohio State Buckeyes football games for two seasons.

== Early life ==
Rizzs grew up in Calumet Park, Illinois, and attended Eisenhower High School in Blue Island, Illinois. He graduated from Southern Illinois University in 1975. He played junior varsity baseball for the Southern Illinois Salukis as a second baseman, declining the chance to play for the varsity team his senior season to focus on broadcasting.

Growing up, Rizzs idolized two future Baseball Hall of Famers, Chicago White Sox shortstop Luis Aparicio and Chicago Cubs announcer Jack Brickhouse.

== Broadcasting career ==
In college, Rizzs was an announcer for the Salukis for WCIL-AM as the baseball team played in the 1974 College World Series. He also broadcast football and basketball games. From 1975 to 1980, Rizzs was a Minor League Baseball radio play-by-play announcer, broadcasting for the Alexandria Aces, Amarillo Gold Sox, and Memphis Chicks. With the Gold Sox, he had to broadcast road games from an Amarillo studio, inventing balls and strikes counts and using sound effects to recreate batted balls and crowd noise. In 1981, he became the sports director at WBNS-AM in Columbus, Ohio, where he called Ohio State football road games and Columbus Clippers baseball games for two seasons. He was named the Ohio Sportscaster of the Year in 1981 by the Ohio Sportscasters Association.

=== Major League Baseball ===
In 1983, Rizzs began broadcasting Mariners games, sharing play-by-play and color commentator roles with Dave Niehaus.

In 1992, Rizzs moved to WJR in Detroit, as the sports director and the new radio play-by-play voice of the Detroit Tigers. He replaced Hall of Famer Ernie Harwell, who had been with the Tigers since the 1960 season and was fired in late 1991. Harwell's dismissal was not popular with fans. Niehaus encouraged Rizzs to seek for the Tigers job. Rizzs teaming with Bob Rathbun, who replaced the retiring Paul Carey, proved to be difficult. Neither were retained after the 1994 season.

Rizzs returned to the Mariners in 1995. In 2000, Rizzs was named the Chicago-area sportscaster of the year by the Chicago Pitch and Hit Club.

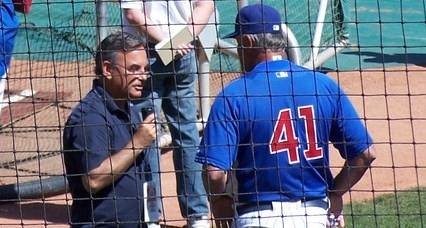
Rick Rizzs interviewing Lou Piniella in 2009.

Although he previously broadcast Mariners games on both television and radio, Rizzs was transferred prior to the 2007 season to work exclusively on Mariners radio broadcasts. For the first three innings of each game, Rizzs was joined in the radio booth by newly hired broadcaster Dave Sims, while Niehaus handled the television side. After the first three innings, Sims and Niehaus switched positions, bringing Niehaus over to the radio side to call the action alongside Rizzs. In games that went to extra innings, Rizzs did the play-by-play for the even-numbered innings.

After Niehaus died in November 2010, Rizzs became the Mariners lead radio voice. During the 2011–2012 seasons, Rizzs broadcast Mariners games with a rotation of guest color commentators, including former Mariners players Dan Wilson, Dave Valle, and Jay Buhner as well as former Mariners announcers Ron Fairly, Ken Wilson, and Ken Levine.

In January 2013, Rizzs was paired on the radio with Aaron Goldsmith, formerly of the Pawsox Radio Network. Goldsmith did the play-by-play for the third, sixth, and seventh innings, as well as even innings when games reached extra innings. In 2017, Rizzs received the Keith Jackson Award from the Seattle Sports Commission. In 2019, he was inducted into the Washington Sports Hall of Fame.

In February 2025, the Mariners announced that Rizzs would be the team's lead radio announcer, with Goldsmith providing the television play-by-play.

On January 27, 2026, Rizzs announced that he would retire from broadcasting after the 2026 season. On August 8, Mariners CEO John Stanton announced during the pre-game ceremony that Rizzs would be inducted into the Mariners Hall of Fame in 2027. During the final weekend of the 2026 season, the Mariners celebrated Rizzs' retirement across a multi-day farewell tribute at T-Mobile Park. Upon his arrival, players and staff (alongside his dog, Tucker) surprised him in the tunnel wearing his commemorative "Holy Smokes!" T-shirts. Following the home games that weekend, the club honored him with a fireworks show, a ceremonial first pitch thrown by Rizzs, and tributes from players. On September 27, Rizzs called his final game, a 7–3 victory over the Los Angeles Angels, concluding a 41-year broadcasting career in Seattle and 52 years total in professional baseball.

== Broadcasting style ==
Early in his broadcasting career, Rizzs was known for being excitable while calling a game. He later adopted some of the signature calls of his longtime Mariners broadcasting partner, Dave Niehaus, following Niehaus' death in 2010.

=== Catchphrases ===
Rizzs is noted for using the following catchphrases on Mariners broadcasts:

- "Goodbye baseball!"- used on home run calls.
- "Holy smoke(s)!"- used for exciting plays.
- "Get out the rye bread and mustard, Grandma, it is grand salami time!"- used when the Mariners hit a grand slam. Formerly used by Niehaus.
- "How about that, buddy?"- also used after a Mariners player hit a grand slam, in honor of Niehaus.
- "Happy totals"- used following a Mariners win the ballgame, now taken over by Aaron Goldsmith. It was originally used by Chicago Cubs broadcasters in the 1970s.

=== Notable calls ===
- "Griffey going back to the warning track, leaps high in the air, and he's got it. An incredible catch by The Kid. He takes away a home run from Jesse Barfield, climbing the wall in left center field in Death Valley here in Yankees Stadium. Holy Smoke." - Ken Griffey Jr.'s home run robbery of Barfield in 1990.
- "Everybody scores" - culminating Luis Sojo's base-clearing double in the 1995 American League West tie-breaker game.
- "Holy smokes! A laser beam strike from Ichiro." - Ichiro Suzuki's assist on Terrence Long in 2001, later dubbed "The Throw".
- "And now, one strike away from baseball history. Hernández looks in, the windup and the 2–2 pitch, strike three called. Félix Hernández pumps his arms in the air!" - ending Hernández's perfect game.
- Cal Raleigh's walk-off home run to clinch a berth in the 2022 MLB postseason.
- "The modern day Bambino" - following Raleigh's 60th home run in the 2025 season.
- "The Mariners are gonna play for the American League championship! The Mariners win the Battle in Seattle in 15 innings" - following Jorge Polanco's walk-off single to end the 2025 American League Division Series.
- Eugenio Suárez's go-ahead grand slam in Game 5 of the 2025 American League Championship Series.

== Personal life ==
Rizzs resides in Issaquah, Washington. He has three grandchildren. His son, Nick, died in November 2023 of an apparent drug overdose. Rizzs has been divorced twice.

In Rizzs's final game as a broadcaster, the city of Issaquah announced that he would get a street named after him in the city, called "Rick Rizzs Road."

In 1995, Rizzs and former Mariner Dave Henderson founded a charity which provided Christmas gifts to children. In November 2024, Rizzs launched Rick's Locker, which provides sporting equipment and gear to children.

Rizzs provided the commentary for the 2005 GameCube video game Nintendo Pennant Chase Baseball, but the game was canceled.

=== Ailments ===
In 1983, Rizzs participated in a Girl Scout Cookies eating contest in a Columbus shopping mall. The next day, after feeling chest pains, he was hospitalized, which delayed an in-person interview with Mariners owner George Argyros about the team's play-by-play .

In 2018, Rizzs tore a bicep during a pickup basketball game, missing time from broadcasting. In December 2022, Rizzs was diagnosed with grade 1 prostate cancer. In July 2023, Rizzs was involved in an all-terrain vehicle accident in which he suffered a fractured vertebra in his neck, two fractured vertebrae in his back, a fractured rib, and cuts on his head and ear. His son extricated him from the overturned vehicle.

On March 10, 2025, while calling a spring training game between the Mariners and Milwaukee Brewers, a foul ball batted by Rhys Hoskins struck Rizzs in the head. Medical staff cleared Rizzs, and he returned to the broadcast one inning later.
