= WORC =

WORC can refer to:

- WORC (AM), a radio station (1310 AM) licensed to Worcester, Massachusetts, United States
- WORC-FM, a radio station (98.9 FM) licensed to Webster, Massachusetts, United States
