= WXLO =

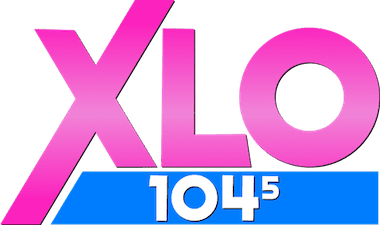
- Fitchburg, Massachusetts; United States
- Broadcast area: Worcester–Boston, Massachusetts and Manchester, New Hampshire
- Frequency: 104.5 MHz
- Branding: 104.5 XLO

Programming
- Format: Hot adult contemporary
- Affiliations: Westwood One

Ownership
- Owner: Cumulus Media; (Radio License Holding CBC, LLC)
- Sister stations: WORC-FM; WWFX

History
- First air date: August 1960
- Former call signs: WFGM-FM (1960–1964); WBNE-FM (1964–1967); WFMP (1967–1984); WXLO (1984–1991); WXLO-FM (1991–1997)
- Former frequencies: 104.7 MHz (1960–1964)

Technical information
- Licensing authority: FCC
- Facility ID: 43557
- Class: B
- ERP: 37,000 watts
- HAAT: 172 meters (564 ft)
- Transmitter coordinates: 42.508°N 71.826°W

Links
- Public license information: Public file; LMS
- Webcast: Listen live
- Website: www.wxlo.com

WXLO (104.5 FM; "104.5 XLO") is a hot adult contemporary radio station owned by Cumulus Media, licensed to Fitchburg, Massachusetts, and serving the Worcester, Boston and Manchester, New Hampshire markets. The station broadcasts on the FM band on a frequency of 104.5 MHz. The studio is located in downtown Worcester, and its main transmission tower is located in the Leominster State Forest in Leominster; three repeaters boost the signal on the same frequency throughout Greater Boston.

== History ==
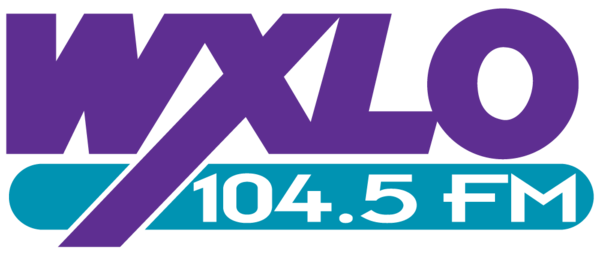
WXLO logo from August 9, 1991, to October 24, 2018

The station has been running an adult contemporary format since 1979, and the call sign WXLO was chosen in January 1984 by station management in tribute to the former New York station. In 1991, the call sign was modified to WXLO-FM when its then-sister station WFGL (960 AM) became WXLO as part of a maintenance simulcast of the FM's programming while its owners looked to sell the AM off, which was done in 1994. The station was reassigned the WXLO call sign by the Federal Communications Commission on June 5, 1997.

WXLO is often the most listened-to adult radio station in the Worcester market. WXLO also has a substantial audience in Greater Boston, especially the area known as MetroWest. Outside the station's hot AC format, WXLO airs specialty programming, and the Awesome '80s Saturday Night. WXLO also spotlights that decade of music with an annual event called the "Awesome '80s Prom". WXLO also hosts an annual Acoustic Christmas event at Mechanics Hall in Worcester that has featured artists such as Train, Guster, Lee Dewyze, Daughtry, Delta Rae, Steven Page, Gavin DeGraw, Andy Grammer, and the Goo Goo Dolls.

On-air personalities include Jen Carter and Frank Foley in the Morning, Laura St. James, Rick Brackett, Diana "Lady D." Steele, and Tim Brennan.

== Booster signals ==
On January 15, 2019, WXLO launched three boosters, in Boston (with a transmitter at the John Hancock Tower), Lexington, and Waltham, to help improve its signal in the Greater Boston area.

Broadcast translators for WXLO
Call sign	Frequency	City of license	FID	ERP (W)	HAAT	Class	Transmitter coordinates	FCC info
WXLO-FM1	104.5 FM	Boston, Massachusetts	201850	10	0 m (0 ft)	D	42°20′57.4″N 71°4′29.2″W	LMS
WXLO-FM2	104.5 FM	Lexington, Massachusetts	201849	150 (Horizontal); 450 (Vertical)	0 m (0 ft)	D	42°24′51.1″N 71°12′37.2″W	LMS
WXLO-FM3	104.5 FM	Waltham, Massachusetts	201847	230 (Horizontal); 700 (Vertical)	0 m (0 ft)	D	42°22′42.3″N 71°16′3.2″W	LMS
