= WNKC =

- Gloucester, Massachusetts; United States
- Broadcast area: North Shore; Merrimack Valley; Greater Boston
- Frequency: 104.9 MHz

Programming
- Format: Contemporary Christian
- Network: K-Love

Ownership
- Owner: Educational Media Foundation
- Sister stations: WKVB

History
- First air date: September 14, 1964
- Former call signs: WVCA-FM (1961–1988); WBOQ (1988–2022)

Technical information
- Licensing authority: FCC
- Facility ID: 61409
- Class: A
- ERP: 6,000 watts
- HAAT: 98 meters (322 ft)
- Transmitter coordinates: 42.6395°N 70.9389°W

Links
- Public license information: Public file; LMS
- Webcast: Listen live
- Website: www.klove.com

WNKC (104.9 FM) is a radio station licensed to Gloucester, Massachusetts, United States. The station is owned by the Educational Media Foundation (EMF) and carries contemporary Christian music through its K-Love network. WNKC operates as the K-Love station for the North Shore and Merrimack Valley regions of Greater Boston, serving portions of the metro area not covered by K-Love's primary Boston-area station, WKVB (107.3 FM).

== History ==
=== WVCA-FM ===
The station was founded by Simon Geller, a native of Lowell, Massachusetts. After working in radio in New Jersey, Geller moved to Gloucester in 1964 because, he told a reporter, it was the biggest town on the East Coast without a radio station. He first applied for a license for an AM station on 1410 kHz; the Federal Communications Commission (FCC) would instead award that frequency to another proposed station in Brockton. They suggested Geller apply for an FM station at 104.9 MHz instead. This station became WVCA-FM: "The Voice of Cape Ann", a phrase which became attached to Geller himself.

Geller operated the station out of his apartment, running it primarily on donations from among his estimated 43,000 listeners within the 35-mile (56 km) radius reached by the station. When it was time to take a lunch break or run an errand, the unpredictable Geller might simply shut the station down. His eccentric on-air behavior earned Geller a loyal following of listeners wondering what he might do or say next.

One of the early programming choices was top 40, followed by classical music later in the evening. Tom Todisco became one of the earliest WVCA-FM DJs, and his show, "Tommy T's Teen Scene" became popular and made a dent in the ratings at the expense of the Boston stations. Tom later became famous for his award-winning direction of WSBK-TV's Boston Red Sox coverage for many years.

Geller owned the station for over 20 years before selling it in 1988 and moving to Las Vegas. During the time he owned WVCA-FM, Grandbanke Communications filed a petition to deny license renewals because, they argued, he had not fulfilled the station's public service requirements. Grandbanke's application to take over the frequency was at first successful but upon appeal it was ultimately denied in 1985. Geller's argument was that the value of the frequency had gone up considerably, to at least $800,000, due to its proximity to Boston.

=== WBOQ ===
After the station's sale to new owner Douglas Tanger in 1988 it maintained its classical programming as WBOQ ("W-Bach"), adding on-air hosts well-versed in the form, such as professional flutist Heather Kent and program director Steve Murphy, a singer and choral conductor. In the late 1990s, WBOQ transitioned to a mix of Broadway and movie music, and later to a jazz standards format.

At the end of 2003 the station flipped to an oldies format under new owner Todd Tanger and program director Charlie Curtis, a veteran air personality at such oldies outlets as WCBS-FM in New York and WOMC in Detroit. It also adopted the new name "North Shore 104.9", to reflect the station's dedication to its North Shore location. With the change the station's listening audience more than quadrupled in size, and the Curtis-hosted "Morning Show" boasted the largest listening audience on the North Shore after all-news WBZ. During this period, WBOQ maintained studios on Route 1A in North Beverly. From 2006 until 2016, it carried Boston Red Sox baseball as part of the Red Sox Radio Network.

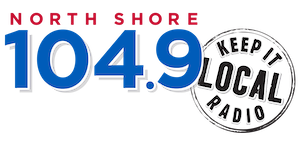
Logo as an adult contemporary station, from December 2017 to July 1, 2022

The station began broadcasting from a new transmitter site in Topsfield on January 10, 2013, with a 6,000–watt signal which increased coverage to other areas such as the Merrimack Valley and the Route 1 corridor; it then began identifying as "WBOQ Gloucester-Boston". On December 26, 2017, WBOQ dropped oldies for adult contemporary.

=== WNKC ===
The adult contemporary format ended on July 1, 2022, when the Educational Media Foundation (EMF) began programming WBOQ under a local marketing agreement with its K-Love network; on July 13, EMF filed to purchase the station for $1.75 million. The acquisition of WBOQ allows K-Love to reach some areas of the Boston market not covered by its primary station in the area, WKVB (107.3 FM). EMF completed its acquisition of the station on September 28, 2022; on October 5, it applied to change the call sign to WNKC effective October 20. The actual change of the call sign occurred on October 21.
