= Worcester Red Sox =

- Founded in 2021; Worcester, Massachusetts

Team logo	Cap insignia

Minor league affiliations
- Class: Triple-A
- League: International League (2021–present)
- Division: East Division

Major league affiliations
- Team: Boston Red Sox

Team data
- Name: Worcester Red Sox (2021–present)
- Colors: Blue, red, yellow, white
- Mascots: Smiley Ball, Woofster the Wonderdog, Roberto the Rocket, Clara the Heart of the Commonwealth
- Ballpark: Polar Park (2021–present)
- Owner/ Operator: Diamond Baseball Holdings
- President: Charles Steinberg
- Manager: Iggy Suarez (acting)
- Media: Radio: WORC-FM (Wed–Sat games) and WWFX (Sun & Tue games); Streaming: MiLB.TV; TV: NESN+ (home games only)
- Website: milb.com/worcester

The Worcester Red Sox (nicknamed the WooSox) are a professional minor league baseball team based in Worcester, Massachusetts, United States. (Note: Worcester is 45 miles (72 km) from Fenway Park in Boston.) Beginning play in 2021, the team is the Triple-A affiliate of the Boston Red Sox, succeeding the Pawtucket Red Sox. The team competes in the International League, known as the Triple-A East for the 2021 season, and plays home games at Polar Park in Worcester, Massachusetts.

== History ==
In February 2015, a group of New England business leaders, led by Larry Lucchino, purchased the Pawtucket Red Sox, a Triple-A affiliate of the Boston Red Sox since 1973. By mid-April, ownership was exploring moving the team from Pawtucket to Providence, Rhode Island. In September, Governor of Rhode Island Gina Raimondo stated that the land in Providence being considered for a stadium, "was not suitable and there were too many obstacles that remained." During 2016, a feasibility study was conducted on potential renovations of the team's Pawtucket ballpark, McCoy Stadium; and from mid-2017 to mid-2018, building a new ballpark in Pawtucket was explored.

A financing arrangement for partial public-funding of new stadium in Pawtucket was rejected by team ownership, who announced on August 17, 2018, that the team would relocate to a new stadium in Worcester, Massachusetts, in April 2021. While it was initially reported that team would be named the Worcester Red Sox, the club announced a "name-that-team" competition in November 2018. The team name was officially announced on November 25, 2019, and confirmed to be the Worcester Red Sox with "WooSox" as the nickname.

Like Providence, Worcester fielded a short-lived major league ballclub in the early 1880s, the Worcester Worcesters, who competed in the National League.

=== Mascots ===
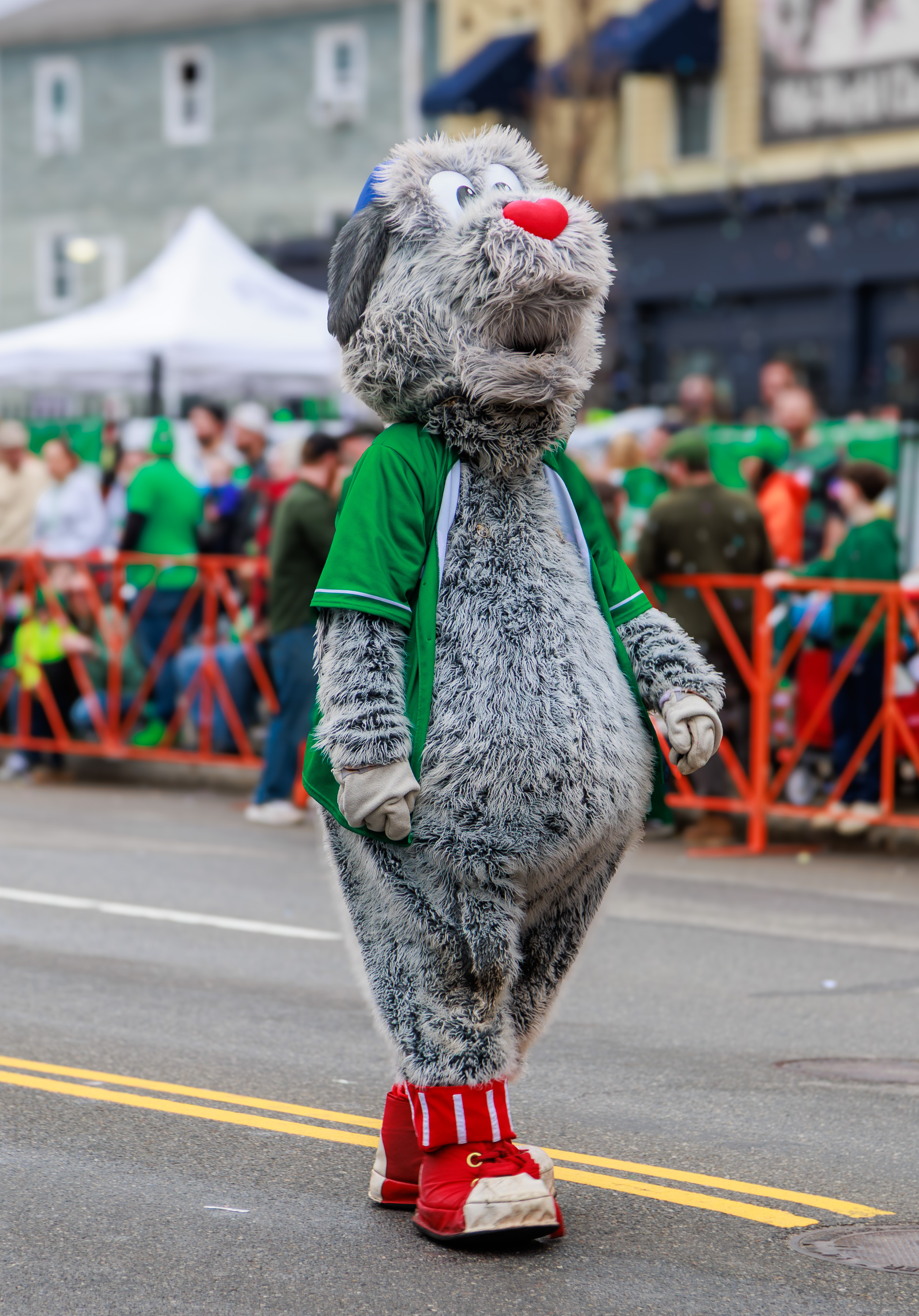
Woofster at the Worcester Patrick's Day Parade

The team's first mascot, Smiley Ball, was introduced in Worcester on October 2, 2020. A dog mascot, Woofster, was introduced in Worcester on August 26, 2021. Roberto the Rocket was also introduced in Worcester on May 19, 2022. The red heart mascot, Clara the Heart of the Commonwealth, was unveiled on May 21, 2024.

=== Debut season ===
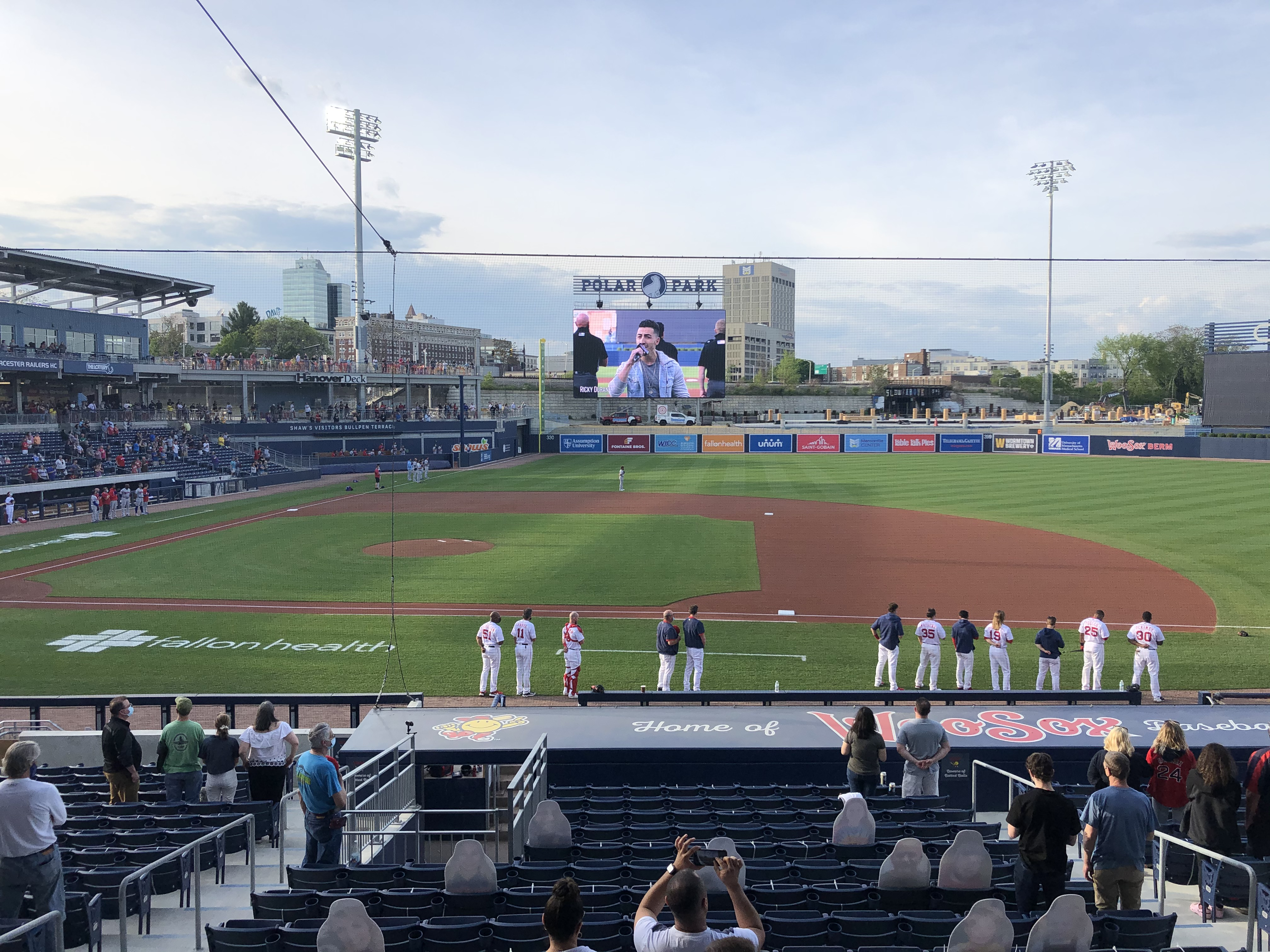
Polar Park

In conjunction with Major League Baseball's restructuring of Minor League Baseball in 2021, the Red Sox were organized into the 20-team Triple-A East. Billy McMillon, who had previously managed the Pawtucket Red Sox, was named Worcester's first manager. The team's first games were originally planned for April; however, the start of the Triple-A season was delayed into May. The team released its debut roster on May 3, and opened the season on May 4 with a loss against the Buffalo Bisons in a game played in Trenton, New Jersey.

The team played select games as "Los Wepas de Worcester" when participating in the Copa de la Diversión, a Minor League Baseball celebration of Hispanic and Latino heritage. In December 2021, team was named winners of the Copa de la Diversión series, and were awarded the "Fun Cup".

=== Later seasons ===
In 2022, the Triple-A East became known as the International League, the name historically used by the regional circuit prior to the 2021 reorganization of the minor leagues. The 2022 WooSox used the most players by any Red Sox Triple-A team, 75, surpassing the prior record of 70 held by the Pawtucket Red Sox of 1995 and 2006.

In November 2023, principal owner Larry Luchino stated he was actively looking to sell the team, explaining that at age 78 he wanted to "move on to blissful retirement." Later that month, the team was purchased by Diamond Baseball Holdings, who also own the Red Sox's Double-A and Single-A franchises, the Portland Sea Dogs and Salem Red Sox.

== Yearly results ==
"Finish" represents the team's final position in its division at the end of regular-season play.

Year	W	L	Pct.	Finish	League	Division	Manager	Postseason
2021	74	54	.578	3rd of 6	Triple-A East	Northeast	Billy McMillon	see Note
2022	75	73	.507	6th of 10	International League	East	Chad Tracy	
2023	79	68	.537	4th of 10	International League	East	Chad Tracy	
2024	79	71	.527	2nd of 10	International League	East	Chad Tracy	
2025	76	73	.510	6th of 10	International League	East	Chad Tracy	
2026	76	67	.531	5th of 10	International League	East	Chad Tracy	

Note: In 2021, each Triple-A team played a 10-game extension to the season, branded as the "Final Stretch"; Worcester went 66–52 per their original schedule, then 8–2 during the Final Stretch, for a final record of 74–54.

== Stadium ==
A new ballpark was constructed for the team, opening for the 2021 Triple-A season. The cost (including land acquisition) was $159 million, with over half of the amount paid by the City of Worcester. With a capacity of approximately 10,000 spectators, it was named Polar Park through a sponsorship and naming rights agreement with Polar Beverages, which is headquartered in Worcester. The first Triple-A game was played at the ballpark on May 11, 2021, with Worcester hosting the Syracuse Mets.

== Roster ==
Worcester Red Sox roster
Players	Coaches/Other
Pitchers: 41 Angel Bastardo; 23 Osvaldo Berrios; 32 John Brebbia *; -- Max Carlson ~; 55 Patrick Halligan; 64 John Holobetz; 31 Tanner Houck * #; 40 Joe La Sorsa *; 51 Seth Martinez *; 62 Sam McWilliams; 29 Johan Oviedo * #; 15 Jedixson Páez; 61 Tyler Samaniego *; 53 Michael Sansone; 35 Noah Song; 17 Devin Sweet; 47 Blake Wehunt; 63 Gage Ziehl; Catchers: 52 Nate Baez; 21 Jason Delay; 33 Nathan Hickey; 86 Juan Montero; 25 Tomas Nido *; Infielders: 16 Franklin Arias; 20 Kristian Campbell *; 13 Vinny Capra; 5 Tsung-Che Cheng *; 18 Max Ferguson; 60 Brett Harris *; 12 Isiah Kiner-Falefa * #; -- Ahbram Liendo ~; 21 Tyler McDonough; 7 Mikey Romero; 10 Trevor Story * #; Outfielders: 24 Allan Castro; 3 Braiden Ward; Designated hitters: 19 Romy Gonzalez *	Manager: 2 Iggy Suarez; Coaches: 61 Brendon Connolly (development); 22 Dan DeLucia (pitching); 10 Rich Gedman (hitting); 30 Noah Junis (bullpen); 16 Johnny Reina (assistant hitting); 60-day injured list: 64 Isaac Coffey; 73 Hobie Harris; 32 Kyle Keller (full season); -- Brendan Rodgers (full season); 7-day injured list; * On Boston Red Sox 40-man roster; ~ Development list; # Rehab assignment; ∞ Reserve list; ‡ Restricted list; § Suspended list; † Temporarily inactive list; Roster updated September 17, 2026; Transactions; → More rosters: MiLB • International League; → Boston Red Sox minor league players

== Retired numbers ==
On December 4, 2019, the team announced that uniform number 6 would be permanently retired, in honor of the six Worcester Fire Department firefighters who perished exactly twenty years prior, in the line of duty while fighting the Worcester Cold Storage and Warehouse Co. fire.

== Broadcasting ==
In March 2020, WORC-FM (an affiliate of Nash Icon) was named as the team's flagship radio station. The broadcasters as of 2022 are Tyler Murray, Jim Cain, Mike Antonellis, and Cooper Boardman. It was later announced that radio coverage would be split between WORC-FM and WWFX. Select games are televised on NESN+.

== Notes ==
Preceded by Pawtucket Red Sox	Boston Red Sox; Triple-A affiliate 2021–present	Succeeded by current
