= WSRO =

- Ashland, Massachusetts; United States
- Broadcast area: MetroWest
- Frequency: 650 kHz (HD Radio) (digital only)
- Branding: AM 650 WSRO

Ownership
- Owner: Alex Langer; (Langer Broadcasting Group, LLC)

History
- First air date: May 19, 1970 (in Peterborough, New Hampshire)
- Last air date: May 31, 2024
- Former call signs: WSCV (1970–1981); WRPT (1981–1989); WMDK (1989–1991); WRPT (1991–1999); WJLT (1999–2002)

Technical information
- Facility ID: 52398
- Class: D
- Power: 1,500 watts day; 100 watts night
- Transmitter coordinates: 42°17′17.35″N 71°25′53.22″W
- Translator: 102.1 W271CU (Framingham)

WSRO (650 HD Radio) was a radio station with a digital-only transmission on a standard AM band frequency. Licensed to Ashland, Massachusetts, it served the MetroWest area. The station was owned by Alex Langer, through Langer Broadcasting Group, LLC. WSRO also operated translator station W271CU (102.1 FM) in Framingham.

Rooted in a station in Peterborough, New Hampshire, WSCV (later WMDK and WRPT), that operated from 1970 to 1991, the WRPT license was moved to Ashland in 1997. Initially relaunching as a talk station, the station later moved to religious programming, before spending much of the 2000s and 2010s as a Portuguese station for Framingham's Brazilian community. After the station ended its Brazilian programming and went silent in 2020 due to financial problems, it became a jazz station. It converted from analog to digital-only operations in 2021, and moved to a classical music format in 2022, before again going silent in 2023 following Langer's death. It briefly returned to the air in 2024, but by 2025 had ceased operations for good.

== History ==
While a station first operated on 650 kHz in Ashland, Massachusetts, in 1997, the underlying license dates back to May 19, 1970, when WSCV in Peterborough, New Hampshire, began operations on 1050 kHz. The station was owned by Frank and Beverly Harms of Syracuse, New York, and managed by John Lawrence Scott, who had hosted children's television programs in Syracuse, and had started up an FM sister station, WSLE 92.1 (now WDER-FM). The station continued to serve Peterborough (later under the call signs of WMDK and WRPT) until 1991, when the station closed down.

In 1995, Alex Langer entered into an agreement to pay the then-owners of the station to return the WRPT license to the Federal Communications Commission (FCC) in order to upgrade the facilities of his station on 1060 kHz in Natick, Massachusetts, WBIV (now WQOM). A few months later, he turned around and purchased WRPT outright, and in 1996 applied to move it to 650 kHz in Ashland.

On February 9, 1997, the new WRPT signed on with talk programming from the Talk America network, operating from a transmitter site in Framingham shared with WKOX (now WXKS). Local talk programming was subsequently added to the schedule (such as an afternoon show hosted by Upton Bell), much of it simulcast on the original WSRO (1470 AM) in Marlborough after Langer bought it in 1998.

In October 1999, the station took the WJLT call letters from 1060 as part of a larger format switch that saw the talk format move to the latter frequency as WMEX, with the contemporary Christian music that had been on 1060 migrating to 650; the switch was completed on-air on January 24, 2000. However, one year later, the station began mixing talk programming back onto the afternoon schedule, as WMEX was converted to business talk station WBIX. The next year, the station switched to a religious talk format, and in December assumed the WSRO callsign from 1470, which was sold to Multicultural Broadcasting and became WAZN in Watertown.

WSRO returned to secular talk in February 2003, primarily from the Langer-owned National Radio Network (which operated out of the same facility in Framingham that WSRO broadcast from); by 2007, the English-language programs had gradually been replaced by a lineup of programming in Portuguese, featuring religious and secular programs aimed at Framingham's Brazilian community. One non-Portuguese program remained on WSRO by 2012: the Guido Oliva Italian Hour, a program for Framingham's Italian community that had started on WKOX in 1950 and moved to WSRO after WKOX left Framingham.

Logo as "Rede ABR", used from January 2015 to July 2020

During the 2010s, Langer Broadcasting expanded the reach of its Portuguese programming. In 2013, having already upgraded WSRO's signal to better reach Cambridge and Boston, it announced plans to launch similar programming for the Boston area on 1410 AM in early 2014, operating from a Hyde Park studio; this station eventually became WZBR. That August, Langer agreed to purchase WBUR's 1240 AM facility in West Yarmouth (on Cape Cod) to serve the Portuguese-speaking community there; that station would become WBAS. (A plan in March 2009 to launch similar programming on WJOE, operating from the Framingham studio but serving western Massachusetts and other parts of New England, did not materialize.) By 2015, the three stations were jointly branded as "Rede ABR".

Langer took the station and its translator silent on July 9, 2020, due to financial difficulties; WBAS and WZBR (the latter of which had left "Rede ABR" to carry a brokered R&B format a few years earlier) also concurrently suspended operations. WSRO returned to the air October 27, 2020, playing jazz standards. In October 2021, WSRO filed with the FCC to end its AM analog transmission on 650 kHz and convert to digital-only MA3 operations effective December 1; it was the fourth station to make this transition, joining WWFD in Frederick, Maryland; WMGG in Tampa, Florida; and WFAS in White Plains, New York. Its translator, W271CU, continued to broadcast in FM analog. On January 1, 2022, WSRO dropped the jazz format for classical music.

WSRO again went silent on March 5, 2023; the shutdown of WSRO and WZBR followed the death of Alex Langer. Both stations had been put up for sale prior to his death; WBAS had already been sold off in 2021. WSRO returned to the air on February 11, 2024, but again suspended operations on May 31. On February 25, 2025, Langer Broadcasting Group requested the cancellation of the WSRO license. It was cancelled on March 7, 2025.

== Translator ==
Broadcast translator for WSRO
Call sign	Frequency	City of license	FID	ERP (W)	Class	Transmitter coordinates	FCC info
W271CU	102.1 FM	Framingham, Massachusetts	142849	40	D	42°17′18.3″N 71°25′51.2″W	LMS

On February 25, 2025, Langer Broadcasting Group requested the cancellation of W271CU's license. It was cancelled on March 7, 2025.
