= WVBF =

Radio station in Middleborough Center, Massachusetts

- Middleborough Center, Massachusetts; United States
- Broadcast area: Middleborough–Taunton
- Frequency: 1530 kHz
- Branding: AM 1530 WVBF

Programming
- Format: Talk and radio reading service programming
- Affiliations: USA Radio News; Massachusetts Reading Network

Ownership
- Owner: Sen. Marc R. Pacheco; (MRP Communications and Consulting, LLC)

History
- First air date: March 31, 1992
- Former call signs: WCEG (1992–1997)
- Call sign meaning: Taken from the former WVBF, now WROR-FM

Technical information
- Licensing authority: FCC
- Facility ID: 63403
- Class: D
- Power: 5,000 watts (day); 4 watts (night)
- Transmitter coordinates: 41°52′56″N 71°3′50″W
- Translator: 99.7 W259DD (Middleborough Center)

Links
- Public license information: Public file; LMS
- Website: wvbfradio.com

WVBF (1530 AM) is a radio station broadcasting a talk format. Licensed to Middleborough Center, Massachusetts, United States, the station serves the Middleborough/Taunton area. The station is owned by Massachusetts state senator Marc R. Pacheco through his MRP Communications and Consulting, LLC. WVBF carries the Massachusetts Reading Network when not airing local programming. USA Radio News plays at the top of the hour during locally produced programs.

== History ==
The station went on the air as WCEG on March 31, 1992. Original owner Steven J. Callahan sold the station to Metro South Broadcasting, owner of WMSX in Brockton, on January 7, 1993. The new owners dropped WCEG's music programming in favor of a simulcast of WMSX; separate programming was subsequently introduced in Portuguese. However, the station had been silent for several years by 1996, when Callahan reached a deal to repurchase the station. Soon after reassuming control on January 5, 1997, Callahan brought WCEG back on the air with radio reading service programming; the call letters were changed to WVBF on March 21, 1997. The WVBF call sign had previously been used by 105.7 FM in Framingham from 1971 until 1993, while broadcasting top 40 and adult contemporary formats; that station is now WROR-FM.

From the station's inception, WCEG/WVBF only broadcast during daytime hours with 1,000 watts; however, 2-watt nighttime service was inaugurated in 2002. In 2006, the station's daytime power was increased to 2,200 watts. On August 7, 2007, WVBF began to air several local talk shows from studios in Taunton; these shows moved from WPEP (1570 AM), which was in the process of closing down to accommodate a power increase at WNSH in Beverly. The radio reading service programming continues when talk programming does not air.

== Translator ==
WVBF is relayed on translator station W259DD, which transmits on 99.7 MHz. It received its license to cover on April 10, 2019.

Broadcast translator for WVBF
Call sign	Frequency	City of license	FID	ERP (W)	HAAT	Class	Transmitter coordinates	FCC info
W259DD	99.7 FM	Middleborough Center, Massachusetts	200670	20	0 m (0 ft)	D	41°52′55″N 71°3′51″W	LMS
