= NRN (disambiguation) =

NRN is a television station in Coffs Harbour, Australia.

NRN may also refer to:

- NASCAR Racing Network, the principal radio broadcasting operation of auto racing organization NASCAR
- National Radio Network (disambiguation)
- Nation's Restaurant News, an American trade publication for the foodservice industry
- Nature Reviews Neuroscience, a review journal covering neuroscience
- "No reply necessary", in Internet slang; see End of message
- Non Resident Nepali
- Weeze Airport (IATA: NRN), an airport in Weeze, Germany
