= WBMS (AM) =

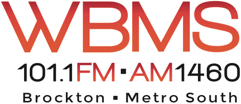
- Brockton, Massachusetts; United States
- Broadcast area: Boston, Massachusetts
- Frequency: 1460 kHz
- Branding: Radio TeleBoston 101.1 FM and AM 1460 WBMS

Programming
- Format: Haitian Creole

Ownership
- Owner: Beatrice Innocent Cesar; (Fraternity Broadcasting Group, LLC)

History
- First air date: November 27, 1946
- Former call signs: WBET (1946–2006); WBZB (2006); WXBR (2006–2016); WATD (2016–2019)
- Former frequencies: 990 kHz (1946–1952)
- Call sign meaning: "Brockton Metro South"

Technical information
- Licensing authority: FCC
- Facility ID: 19631
- Class: D
- Power: 5,000 watts day; 30 watts night
- Transmitter coordinates: 42°3′1.36″N 71°3′40.17″W
- Translator: 101.1 W266DA (Brockton)

Links
- Public license information: Public file; LMS
- Webcast: Listen live
- Website: www.radioteleboston.com

WBMS (1460 AM; "Radio TeleBoston") is a radio station licensed to Brockton, Massachusetts. The station is owned by Beatrice Innocent Cesar through licensee Fraternity Broadcasting Group, LLC. The station also broadcasts through FM translator station W266DA (101.1). WBMS broadcasts programming in Haitian Creole.

== History ==
=== As WBET ===
WBMS signed on as WBET on November 27, 1946. The station was owned by The Brockton Publishing Company, with studios on 60 Main Street in Brockton, inside the headquarters of The Enterprise newspaper. The original frequency was 990 kHz, daytime only, but by 1952 would move to its current 1460 kHz frequency due to the owners of WBET buying the two other Brockton stations, WBKA (1450 AM) and WBKA-FM 107.1. WBET then turned in the licenses for 990 and 107.1 and moved WBET to 1460. WBKA had been owned by Joseph Curran. The 1951 Broadcasting Yearbook does not list either WBKA or WBKA-FM but the 1953 Broadcasting Yearbook lists WBET as having a construction permit for 1460 with 1,000 watts and the following year is listed as being on 1460.

FM simulcast service would be added with the 1948 launch of WBET-FM 97.7. When WBET would sign off at sundown, WBET-FM provided service through the nighttime hours. In 1976, WBET-FM ended its simulcasts of the AM station and began broadcasting a top 40 format. A year later, its call letters were changed to WCAV. In 1982, the station switched to a country music format and remained with it until 1999 when Radio One purchased WCAV and moved its studios out of Brockton. Today, that station is operated from studios in Medford by iHeartMedia as WZRM and broadcasts a Spanish contemporary hits format.

WBET featured local news, talk, sports and a variety of different programs and was promoted as "Full Service Radio for Metro South".

=== Sale to Business Talk Radio Network, as WBZB/WXBR ===
WBET was purchased in 2006 by the Business Talk Radio Network based in Greenwich, Connecticut. Syndicated programming from the network was added to the station's lineup. To reflect the new owner's focus on business talk programming, the station was assigned the WBZB call letters on November 24, 2006, three days ahead of the 60th anniversary of WBET's first sign-on. The new call sign was soon met with a cease-and-desist from WBZ in Boston; on December 12, 2006, the station changed its call sign to WXBR, also in reflection of "Business Radio".

The station was put up for sale in 2011. On May 2, 2012, WXBR staff was evicted from its studios for failure by its owner to pay rent. During this time, the station aired only those programs syndicated by the Business Talk Radio Network.

=== Sale to Azure Media ===
On May 18, 2012, the Federal Communications Commission (FCC) approved the sale of WXBR to Azure Media, LLC., a Haitian American-owned radio group based in Miami Gardens, Florida. The station's local programming returned to the air that day with its rent paid.

On August 3, 2012, Azure Media officially took control of WXBR and signed the station off at 7 p.m. the same day. Former station personalities Dawn Carr and Dennis DeNapoli were on hand at its 60 Main Street studios to announce that the station would be off the air as its studios were relocated and thank all of its current personalities and staff at the time. This was followed by a vintage programming promo voiced by Jack Ainslie from its days as WBET and the playing of "Bye, Bye, Baby (Baby Goodbye)" by The Four Seasons. DeNapoli read the final station identification before the station went silent.

Azure Media constructed new studios on 250 Belmont Street in Brockton with new studio equipment and replaced the station's transmitter. Also, a new logo and website was designed. The new owners intended to return most of WXBR's original programming and hosts under the previous ownership and invite local businesses and community members to start new programs on the station. The station was originally scheduled to return to the air on September 12, 2012. However, problems with the installation of the new transmitter delayed that return. It was later revealed that copper plates needed to transmit were allegedly stolen from its transmitter site in West Bridgewater among other unexpected issues. Those issues were successfully resolved and almost six months to the day after the station signed off, WXBR returned to the air on February 2, 2013, at 6:50 p.m. with a 30-minute test broadcast consisting of a mix of classic rock and country music played from its new studios. More stunting was periodically conducted in the days that followed. The station officially returned to the air on March 5, 2013.

Azure attempted to restore WXBR's original format of local news, talk, sports and variety programming with a mix of longtime personalities, new faces and syndicated offerings. They also encouraged community members to purchase time on the station to develop new programs under a time-brokered format. However, according to reports, the station had been unsuccessful with these efforts and was losing revenue under this format. On July 7, 2014, Azure Media announced that it would be ending WXBR's in-house broadcasts and change the station's format to ethnic Haitian Creole. The station's last day of airing local news and talk programs was July 11, 2014. The station was branded as Radio Azure 1460, adopted the slogan La Radio Haitienne de Boston (Boston's Haitian Radio Station), and had its studios relocated to Randolph, Massachusetts.

=== Sale to Marshfield Broadcasting Company, as WATD/WBMS ===
On April 29, 2015, the Marshfield Broadcasting Company and owner Ed Perry entered into an agreement to purchase WXBR from Azure Media. The station was taken silent shortly thereafter and the sale was closed on July 17, 2015, at a purchase price of $165,000. The new owner planned to bring the station's studios back to Brockton, restore its original full service format and change its call sign to WATD, in reference to the company's flagship station, WATD-FM in Marshfield. The station changed its call sign to WATD on April 28, 2016.

In February 2019, WATD returned to the air with a simulcast of WATD-FM and signed on FM translator station W266DA. On March 1, the station changed its call sign to WBMS, which stands for "Brockton Metro South". This would be the third time the WBMS call sign was used in the Boston market, as it was the call sign for WILD (1090 AM) from its sign-on in 1946 to 1951 and again from 1952 to 1957. The station would air limited original programming and sports with a locally based oldies format on weekdays while continuing to simulcast WATD-FM.

Beatrice Innocent Cesar's Fraternity Broadcasting Group agreed to purchase WBMS from Marshfield Broadcasting for $350,000 in late 2023. The sale was completed on January 31, 2024. Cesar is the wife of Gerlens Cesar, who formerly operated the Haitian pirate radio station "Radio TeleBoston" in Malden and Mattapan with Acerome Jean Charles until being fined $453,015 in 2019, which was reduced to $5,000 in 2020 on the condition that they would not operate another pirate station within 20 years. Gerlens Cesar told The Boston Globe in September 2024 that he was a partner in the purchase of WBMS, which was not disclosed in Fraternity Broadcasting Group's filing with the FCC.

== Programming ==
=== Former hosts ===
One of the earliest personalities at WBET was Arthur "Doc" Jones. He was brought over from the former WBKA in 1952 and hosted the morning drive time slot from that point through the mid-to-late 1970s. After Jones, William "Bill" Hess took over the time slot and hosted until 1983. He is currently the program director at WMAL-FM in Washington, D.C. Charlie Bergeron hosted the morning show for 21 years (1983 to 2004). He was also WBET's program director, general manager and play-by-play announcer for high school sports during his time at the station. In 2004, frequent fill-in host Steve Mason became the successor to Bergeron, who is currently a freelance broadcaster and weekend sports anchor at WBZ in Boston.

In January 2009, WXBR made changes to its traditional morning drive format, which featured two people; Mason and news director Kevin Tocci. Management cited tough economic times and decided go with a single personality. Tocci was asked to continue with live news updates, and also to fill the role of host. Mason was let go after 16 years at the station and is currently a personality on WPLM-FM in Plymouth. The show was renamed The Metro South Morning News with Kevin Tocci. Tocci also hosted a sports talk show on the station with Mark Littlefield on Saturday afternoons called KITB Sports Talk (KITB standing for "Krashing into the Bigfield").

After Azure Media took over ownership of the station and took it off the air in August 2012, Tocci departed and joined WATD-FM as a news correspondent and talk show host. When the station returned to the air in March 2013, Peter Czymbor and Mike Paiva took over as hosts and the show was known as the Metro South Morning Show or PM in the AM until the switch to ethnic Haitian in July 2014.

Jim Larkin was one of the longest-tenured personalities at WBET/WXBR. He hosted Sounds of the Emerald Isle, an Irish music and comedy show, Sunday afternoons from 1982 to 2012. When Azure Media took over ownership of the station and took it off the air in August 2012, Larkin moved his show to WVBF in Middleborough Center.

Bill Alex hosted Newsline, a popular Brockton-area morning talk show/news program weekdays from 9 to 11 a.m. during the 1990s. Bill also reported news events during the day at WBET. Ron Van Dam, who was brought over from cross-town WMSX, became the successor to Alex's program in 2001 and hosted until the change in formats in July 2014.

== Translator ==
Broadcast translator for WBMS
Call sign	Frequency	City of license	FID	ERP (W)	Class	Transmitter coordinates	FCC info
W266DA	101.1 FM	Brockton, Massachusetts	140627	220	D	42°3′1.3″N 71°3′40.1″W	LMS
