= WLYN =

- Lynn, Massachusetts; United States
- Broadcast area: Greater Boston
- Frequency: 1360 kHz

Programming
- Format: Oldies; classic hits

Ownership
- Owner: Multicultural Broadcasting; (Multicultural Radio Broadcasting Licensee, LLC)
- Sister stations: WAZN

History
- First air date: December 11, 1947
- Former call signs: WLYN (1947–1977); WNSR (1977–1979)
- Call sign meaning: Lynn, Massachusetts

Technical information
- Licensing authority: FCC
- Facility ID: 53948
- Class: D
- Power: 700 watts daytime; 76 watts nighttime
- Transmitter coordinates: 42°27′10.35″N 70°58′48.18″W

Links
- Public license information: Public file; LMS
- Webcast: Listen live

WLYN (1360 AM) is a brokered time radio station in the Greater Boston area broadcasting oldies and classic hits programming. The station is licensed to Lynn, Massachusetts, and is owned by Multicultural Broadcasting. Its programming is broadcast on 1360 kHz on the AM band.

== History ==
WLYN first signed on the air on December 11, 1947, as a daytime-only station. It operated at 500 watts, and the transmitter was located near the Fox Hill Bridge. The opening was covered by the city's two local newspapers, the Lynn Daily Evening Item and the Lynn Telegram-News. The new station's president was A. (Avigdor) M. "Vic" Morgan, a veteran broadcaster who had been involved with mechanical television in TV's formative years; he had been the general manager of the Shortwave & Television Company in Boston in the early 1930s. Among the air-staff were greater Boston radio veterans like Ned French and Raymond Knight. In charge of women's programming as well as public affairs and educational programs was Dorothy Rich; Mrs. Rich was also the radio director at Endicott Junior College in Beverly, Massachusetts.

The station was sold on March 3, 1950, to Brookline businessman Theodore "Ted" Feinstein. (Feinstein also would own other smaller market stations, including WNBP in Newburyport and WTSA in Brattleboro, Vermont.) For many years, WLYN served the North Shore with local programming, local news, local high school sports, and talk shows that focused on local issues. WLYN played mainly popular music, and in the 1950s and 1960s, it continued to employ well-known announcers who had worked at other greater Boston area stations. They included John "Jack" Chadderton, Hank Forbes, Chris Clausen, talk host Morgan Baker (formerly of WEEI in Boston) and Johnny Towne. Later, WLYN switched to nostalgia and big-band music, hiring well-known veteran broadcasters like Bill Marlowe. For a brief period of time in the mid-1970s, the station also experimented with country music, but this was unsuccessful.

In 1948, WLYN's president A.M. Morgan also put an FM station on the air; WLYN-FM used the 101.7 frequency. For many years, it simulcast WLYN during the day and had its own programming after the AM signed off at sunset. In the early 1970s, responding to an influx of Spanish-speaking immigrants, both WLYN and WLYN-FM began offering an hour of programming in Spanish each Sunday.

By the mid-1970s, WLYN-FM had begun broadcasting Greek and Italian ethnic programming in the midday and late evening hours, with drive times still simulcast with the AM. In 1981, WLYN-FM began broadcasting a nighttime block of "new wave" rock music which eventually became a 24/7 modern rock format in 1982 when the midday ethnic programs were moved to the AM side. In February 1983, WLYN-FM was sold to Stephen Mindich, owner of the Boston Phoenix, and in early April it was on the air under new call letters—WFNX; the new station retained for the most part the modern-rock format that had been launched by the previous owners, and subsequently expanded upon it. (101.7 is now WBWL.)

Since the early 1980s, WLYN has continued to broadcast ethnic programming, and now broadcasts 24 hours a day, with reduced nighttime power. WLYN broadcast in AM Stereo until the end of 2006. In December 2024, all ethnic programming was dropped and WLYN switched to automated oldies and classic hits.
