= WARE =

- Ware, Massachusetts; United States
- Broadcast area: Springfield metropolitan area
- Frequency: 1250 kHz
- Branding: Classic Hits 97.7

Programming
- Format: Classic hits
- Affiliations: ABC News Radio; Valley Blue Sox

Ownership
- Owner: Success Signal Broadcasting, Inc.
- Sister stations: Through part-owner Kurt Jackson: WQVR; WQVD; WATR

History
- First air date: July 11, 1949 (as WRMS)
- Former call signs: WRMS (1948–1949)
- Call sign meaning: Ware (city of license)

Technical information
- Licensing authority: FCC
- Facility ID: 70877
- Class: B
- Power: 5,000 watts day; 2,500 watts night
- Transmitter coordinates: 42°14′43.33″N 72°12′27.29″W
- Translator: 97.7 W249DP (Springfield)

Links
- Public license information: Public file; LMS
- Webcast: Listen live
- Website: www.classichits977.com

WARE (1250 AM) is a commercial radio station broadcasting a classic hits format. Licensed to Ware, Massachusetts, United States, the station serves the Springfield radio market. The station is owned by Success Signal Broadcasting. WARE also operates an FM translator in Springfield, W249DP (97.7 MHz). The translator has its tower near Palmer, Massachusetts, and is powered at 250 watts.

The station calls itself "The Valley's Classic Hits" referring to the Pioneer Valley of the Connecticut River.

== Translator ==
Broadcast translator for WARE
Call sign	Frequency	City of license	FID	ERP (W)	Class	Transmitter coordinates	FCC info
W249DP	97.7 FM	Springfield, Massachusetts	63474	250	D	42°8′30.3″N 72°20′53.3″W	LMS

== History ==
WARE first signed on the air in 1948, originally as WRMS. It was owned by Donald W. Howe and was a daytimer. It transmitted with 1,000 watts and had to go off the air at sunset to avoid interfering with other stations on AM 1250. A year later, in 1949, it switched its call letters to WARE.

=== Unusual call letters ===
WARE is one of three stations in the United States where the call sign spells out the name of the city of license. The other stations are WACO-FM in Waco, Texas, and WISE-FM in Wise, Virginia (a satellite of WVTF).
