= Aaron Goldsmith =

American sportscaster (born 1983)

- Born: August 29, 1983 (age 43); Wichita, Kansas, U.S.
- Education: Principia College (IL)
- Sports commentary career
- Team: Seattle Mariners (2013–present)
- Genre: Play-by-play
- Sport(s): Major League Baseball, College football, College basketball, National Football League

Aaron Goldsmith (born August 29, 1983) is an American sportscaster who is the lead television play-by-play broadcaster for the Seattle Mariners of Major League Baseball. In the off-season, he provides play-by-play for college basketball for Fox Sports.

== Early life ==
Goldsmith was born in Wichita, Kansas, and grew up in St. Louis, Missouri. He attended Principia College in Elsah, Illinois, earning a degree in history

== Career ==
Upon graduation, Goldsmith began play-by-play broadcasting as an intern for Gateway Grizzlies games. In 2007, he provided two innings of play-by-play for each home game. Goldsmith followed this up with an unpaid internship with the Bourne Braves of the Cape Cod Baseball League, and then a similar position with the Portland Sea Dogs. For both teams, he called select games or innings and often found himself starving after calling games.

After a brief time with the Sea Dogs, Goldsmith worked as the play-by-play voice for the Frisco RoughRiders in 2010 and 2011. He also served as the team's manager of broadcasting and public relations. During his time with the RoughRiders, Goldsmith proposed to his now-wife.

In 2012, Goldsmith was hired as the play-by-play voice for the Pawsox Radio Network, provided play-by-play for every game that season, a first in his career. Goldsmith said he joined the PawSox because of their history of producing big-name announcers; he knew that was not guaranteed.

In 2013, Goldsmith joined the Mariners, working alongside Rick Rizzs. Goldsmith and his family now live in the Seattle suburb of Kirkland, Washington. Goldsmith's play-by-play style is often attributed to an adaptation of Vin Scully, but Goldsmith attributes his style to his work with Eric Nadel and Dave O'Brien. On December 26, 2021, he was a last-minute substitution for Gus Johnson, teaming with Aqib Talib for an NFL on FOX game in Seattle between the Chicago Bears and Seattle Seahawks. In January 2023, Goldsmith elected to remain with the Mariners after being the St. Louis Cardinals' top candidate for their lead TV job. Goldsmith has also announced some Mariners game broadcast on Fox.

Goldsmith became the Mariners' full-time TV broadcaster after Dave Sims left Seattle to replace John Sterling as the radio voice of the New York Yankees following the 2024 season. Goldsmith had split time with Sims on Mariners broadcasts. Goldsmith won the 2025 Washington State Sportscaster of the Year award, an award Sims won three times while both were Mariners broadcasters.

== Personal life ==
Goldsmith is married and has three children and a dog.
