= Owen A. Hoban =

District attorney of Worcester County, Massachusetts
- In office 1935–1947
- Preceded by: Edwin G. Norman
- Succeeded by: Alfred B. Cenedella

Personal details
- Born: May 13, 1875 Winchendon, Massachusetts, U.S.
- Died: December 21, 1952 (aged 77) Gardner, Massachusetts, U.S.
- Resting place: St. John's Cemetery; Gardner, Massachusetts
- Party: Democratic (until 1920); Republican (after 1920)
- Spouse: Mary E. Vaughn (m. 1906)
- Children: 1
- Education: Dartmouth College
- Occupation: Attorney

Owen A. Hoban (May 13, 1875 – December 21, 1952) was an American attorney and politician who served as district attorney of Worcester County, Massachusetts from 1935 to 1947.

== Early life ==
Hoban was born on May 13, 1875, in Winchendon, Massachusetts. He was educated in the Winchendon public schools and attended the College of the Holy Cross for two years. He graduated from Dartmouth College in 1899 and after one year of study at the Boston University School of Law, went into the field of advertising. In 1904, he moved to Gardner, Massachusetts and resumed his law studies in the office of Joseph P. Carney. On November 28, 1906, Hoban married Mary E. Vaughn of Garner. They had one child who died in infancy.

== Career ==
Hoban was admitted to the bar on August 20, 1906 and began practicing in Athol, Massachusetts the following year as Carney's partner. In 1908, Hoban returned to Gardner and opened his own law office.

Hoban was elected to the Garner school committee in 1910. In 1914, he was the Democratic nominee for the United States House of Representatives seat in Massachusetts's 3rd congressional district, but lost to incumbent Calvin Paige. In 1919, Hoban became chairman of the school committee. Under his leadership, Gardner, which had a majority foreign-born population, created Massachusetts' first adult night education for immigrants. Mothers' clubs were formed, factories held classes after working hours, and attendance in night school increased from 400 to over 1,000 due to Hoban's efforts. In the 1920 United States presidential election, he supported Warren G. Harding and was a member of the Republican Party thereafter.

In 1922, he was appointed associate justice of the first district court of northern Worcester County. He resigned in 1927 to become an assistant district attorney. He was elected district attorney in 1934 and served three-consecutive four-year terms until deciding not to seek reelection in 1946. In 1935, he prosecuted Newell P. Sherman for the murder of his wife, Alice, in a case that received nationwide attention.

Hoban was one of the founders of Gardner's first radio station, which was named WHOB in his honor.

== Death ==
Hoban died on December 21, 1952 in Gardner. A member of the Catholic Church, his funeral was held in Sacred Heart Church and he was buried in St. John's Cemetery.
