= WKDX =

- Hamlet, North Carolina; United States
- Frequency: 1250 kHz

Programming
- Format: Gospel

Ownership
- Owner: The Mclaurin Group

Technical information
- Facility ID: 56324
- Class: D
- Power: 1,000 watts day 80 watts night
- Transmitter coordinates: 34°53′6.00″N 79°40′50.00″W

Links
- Website: www.wkdx.net

WKDX (1250 AM) "The Spirit" is a radio station broadcasting a Gospel format. Licensed to Hamlet, North Carolina, United States. The station is currently owned by The McLaurin Group.

== History ==
WKDX was originally constructed and owned by Risden Allen Lyon of Wadesboro, North Carolina. The station was constructed in 1956.

Lyon sold the station to Peace Valley Baptist Church effective July 31, 1991. In 1992 the Lyon family sued Peace Valley Baptist Church and several individuals involved with the transaction for non-payment, and regained ownership.

In 2000 the Lyon family sold WKDX to the McLaurin Group.
