= WDVA =

Radio station in Danville, Virginia

- Danville, Virginia; United States
- Broadcast area: Danville, Virginia; Chatham, Virginia; Eden, North Carolina; Yanceyville, North Carolina
- Frequency: 1250 kHz
- Branding: Great Gospel 1250 WDVA

Programming
- Format: Black Gospel

Ownership
- Owner: Mitchell Communications, Inc.

History
- First air date: June 29, 1947
- Call sign meaning: Danville, Virginia

Technical information
- Licensing authority: FCC
- Facility ID: 43244
- Class: B
- Power: 5,000 watts
- Transmitter coordinates: 36°34′53.0″N 79°26′33.0″W

Links
- Public license information: Public file; LMS
- Webcast: WDVA Webstream
- Website: WDVA Online

WDVA is a Black Gospel formatted broadcast radio station licensed to Danville, Virginia, serving Danville and Chatham in Virginia and Eden and Yanceyville in North Carolina. WDVA is owned and operated by Mitchell Communications, Inc.
