= WYYC =

Coordinates: 39°59′56″N 76°41′43″W

- York, Pennsylvania; United States
- Frequency: 1250 kHz
- Branding: Truth Talk 1250; Truth Talk 98.1

Programming
- Format: Christian talk and teaching

Ownership
- Owner: Steel City Radio, Inc.

History
- First air date: July 1948
- Former call signs: WNOW (1948–1985); WOBG (1985–1988); WXKU (1988–1991); WQXA (1991–2005)

Technical information
- Licensing authority: FCC
- Facility ID: 52172
- Class: D
- Power: 1000 watts day 33 watts night
- Translator: 98.1 W251CE (York)

Links
- Public license information: Public file; LMS
- Webcast: WYYC 1250 Listen Live; WYYC 98.1 Listen Live
- Website: WYYC 1250 Online; WYYC 98.1 Online

WYYC (1250 AM) is a religious radio station in York, Pennsylvania, and is owned by Steel City Radio, Inc.
