= WORC-FM =

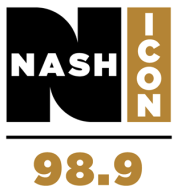
- Webster, Massachusetts; United States
- Broadcast area: Worcester County, Massachusetts
- Frequency: 98.9 MHz
- Branding: 98.9 Nash Icon

Programming
- Format: Country
- Affiliations: Worcester Railers; Worcester Red Sox

Ownership
- Owner: Cumulus Media; (Radio License Holding CBC, LLC)
- Sister stations: WWFX; WXLO

History
- First air date: April 8, 1994
- Former call signs: WXXW (1994–1998)
- Call sign meaning: Former FM sister station of WORC

Technical information
- Licensing authority: FCC
- Facility ID: 50231
- Class: A
- ERP: 1,870 watts
- HAAT: 125 meters (410 ft)
- Transmitter coordinates: 42°2′11.3″N 71°59′20.3″W

Links
- Public license information: Public file; LMS
- Webcast: Listen live
- Website: www.nashicon989.com

WORC-FM (98.9 MHz) is a commercial radio station licensed to Webster, Massachusetts, and serving the Worcester metropolitan area. It is owned by Cumulus Media and airs a country radio format, mostly featuring songs from the 1990s and early 2000s, with occasional newer songs. The studios are on Commercial Street in Downtown Worcester in the Winsor Building. It carries the games of the Worcester Red Sox and Worcester Railers.

WORC-FM has an effective radiated power (ERP) of 1,870 watts. Its transmitter is on Blackmere Road in Dudley. The station serves most of Worcester County, Massachusetts, and northeastern Connecticut.

== History ==
The station signed on April 8, 1994, as WXXW. Its initial format, a blend of hot talk and oldies, would not launch until April 11; in the interim, the station stunted by continuously playing Bob Seger's "Old Time Rock and Roll".

Following original owner Alan Okun's death on December 31, 1996, the station and its AM sister station WGFP were sold to Bengal Atlantic Communications in 1997. Bengal Atlantic sold them to Chowder Broadcasting soon afterward. Chowder switched WXXW to a classic rock format in 1998. In September, this was followed by a call sign change to WORC-FM, reflecting its newly-common ownership with WORC (1310 AM).

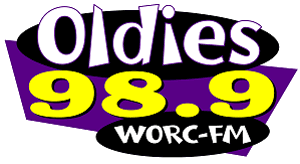
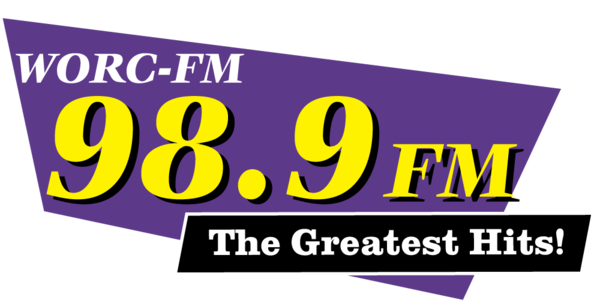
Logos as an oldies station

Montachusett Broadcasting, the owner of WXLO, acquired WORC-FM in 1999. Several months later, the stations were sold to Citadel Broadcasting. Citadel subsequently acquired competing classic rock station WWFX and as a result reverted WORC-FM to oldies on May 26, 2000. During its oldies era, WORC-FM would broadcast American Top 40: The 70s with Casey Kasem on Saturday mornings and Sunday evenings.

Citadel merged with Cumulus Media on September 16, 2011. On October 31, 2014, at 10:00 a.m., WORC-FM flipped to country music. It used Cumulus' brand for 1990s and 2000s country music, "Nash Icon".

On July 7, 2017, the Worcester Railers hockey team announced that WORC-FM would broadcast its games. In March 2020, WORC-FM was named as the flagship radio station for the inaugural season of the Worcester Red Sox. The games began to be broadcast in the 2021 season.
