= WOON =

- Woonsocket, Rhode Island; United States
- Broadcast area: Blackstone Valley
- Frequency: 1240 kHz
- Branding: O-N AM & FM

Programming
- Format: Full service
- Affiliations: Compass Media Networks; Metro Networks; Boston Bruins Radio Network; Boston Celtics Radio Network

Ownership
- Owner: O-N Radio, Inc.

History
- First air date: November 11, 1946
- Former call signs: WWON (1946–1992)
- Call sign meaning: Woonsocket

Technical information
- Licensing authority: FCC
- Facility ID: 73676
- Class: C
- Power: 1,000 watts
- Transmitter coordinates: 42°0′58.35″N 71°29′28.22″W
- Translator: 99.5 W258DU (Woonsocket)

Links
- Public license information: Public file; LMS
- Webcast: Listen live
- Website: www.woonsocketradio.com

WOON (1240 AM) is Woonsocket, Rhode Island's oldest radio station, having taken to the air on November 11, 1946, as WWON, a callsign it kept until the current WOON became available in 1992. The change in call became effective on February 3, 1992. On June 26, 1949, WWON added a sister station with WWON-FM 105.5, later moving to 106.3 MHz. That station is now WWKX.

WWON was owned by the local newspaper The Woonsocket Call for a time. It is currently owned by O-N Radio, Inc. WOON's programming day consists of almost exclusively locally originating programming with a few exceptions (Cowboy Corner, Old Time Radio, The Cowboy Show, and a few other shows). WOON's format is "full-service" meaning it mixes news/talk and music (in WOON's case: oldies and adult contemporary among others).

== Technical parameters ==
WOON operates on 1240 kHz with an unlimited power level of 1,000 watts unlimited hours, diplexing off of the WNRI tower. Originally it was licensed for 250 watts, later upgrading to 1,000 watts day and 250 watts night before receiving authorization to increase nighttime power to 1,000 watts as well.

== Programming ==
WOON is a full service station. On weekdays WOON begins with morning host Joe Callahan followed by a roundtable discussion program entitled "Coffee An'". Coffee An' is billed by the station as the longest running panel discussion program in American radio. Following that, WOON's programs consist of a nutrition show, a nostalgia show ("Do You Remember?"), an astrology show, old-time radio, a midday music/trivia/interview show, varied programs in the mid-afternoon and evening. Weekend programs consist of easy listening music and oldies as well as sports and programs in the Portuguese, Polish and Spanish languages. WOON also serves as the home station for Bryant University athletics and Woonsocket Villanovans sports.

== Internet-only stations ==
Besides its primary AM signal on 1240 kHz, it operates several internet stations including all-news "O-N2", all-sports "O-N3", and internet TV station "O-N TV" plus an on-demand service.

== History ==
WWON signed on the air with 250 watts (day and night) on November 11, 1946, as Woonsocket's lone radio station. It would add FM service with WWON-FM 105.5 on June 26, 1949.

WWON is listed as a Mutual Broadcasting System affiliate along with WWON-FM in 1976. Current morning personality Dave Richards took over the slot in 1978.

In the 1980s, WWON is part of the Boston Bruins Radio Network. Later that decade, WWON-FM is spun off from the AM station, eventually becoming WWKX.

Logo before translator sign on

On February 3, 1992, WWON changed its call sign to WOON after that call becomes available. On July 24, 2018, WOON added FM service on 99.5 via translator W258DU.

== FM translator ==
Call sign	Frequency	City of license	FID	ERP (W)	HAAT	Class	Transmitter coordinates	FCC info
W258DU	99.5 FM	Woonsocket, Rhode Island	201051	150	70 m (230 ft)	D	41°59′43.4″N 71°30′18.2″W	LMS
