= National Radio Network (United States) =

Former American radio network

National Radio Network (NRN) was a commercial radio network in United States. It was owned and operated by Langer Broadcasting, which is located in Framingham, Massachusetts, and was operated from flagship station WSRO. The network primarily relied on other networks, including CRN Digital Talk Radio Networks and the USA Radio Network, to provide programming over a very limited network of affiliates. It ceased operations in 2010 when WSRO switched to Portuguese language programming.
