= WSRA =

Albany, Georgia; United States
- Broadcast area: Albany Georgia area
- Frequency: 1250 kHz
- Branding: World's Sports Radio Albany

Programming
- Format: Sports
- Affiliations: Infinity Sports Network

Ownership
- Owner: Livingston W. Fulton

History
- First air date: May 1, 1962 (as WLYB)
- Former call signs: WLYB (May 1, 1962-July 17, 1972); WQDE (July 17, 1972-August 31, 1987); WANL (August 31, 1987-July 1, 2002)

Technical information
- Licensing authority: FCC
- Facility ID: 37451
- Class: D
- Power: 1,000 watts day 53 watts night
- Transmitter coordinates: 31°37′0.00″N 84°9′32.00″W

Links
- Public license information: Public file; LMS
- Website: wsraradio.com

WSRA (1250 AM) is a radio station broadcasting a sports format. Licensed to Albany, Georgia, United States, the station serves the Albany, GA area. The station is currently owned by Livingston W. Fulton and features programming from Infinity Sports Network. The stations website currently shows the NBC Sports logo.

== History ==
WSRA began as WLYB, first receiving its license on November 21, 1962. It changed callsigns to WQDE on July 17, 1972.

In its earliest form AM 1250 was a country station.

The following history [between brackets] was added by Dave Miller, who worked at the station in 1975 and 1976:

Its call sign in the late 1960s and early 1970s was WLYB, which stood for Lynn-Yvette Broadcasting. It was run by Dave Flaegel, a broadcaster of great girth, who custom made a rolling chair from the seat of a Pontiac Bonneville, and reinforced it with steel bracing.

It was bought by Jim Wiggins, a Brunswick broadcaster, who also owned WYND, a country AM in Glynn County in the early 1970s.

He changed the call sign to WQDE, "Cutie" for short, and played AC/Light Rock. In this time, the station made a meteoric rise and became a major player in the market, becoming a strong challenger to the venerable WALG/1590AM.

In late 1972, two heavy weight broadcasters left WALG to go to WQDE, including Ron Brown, a.k.a. 'Buzz One' on WALG, and Ron Maniscalco, who programmed WALG as Ron Mani. Ron Strother and Sonny Lofton also graced WQDE's air with great talent.

Mani brought his "Original Saturday Morning Rock Revival" Oldies show, with great success.

Albany native James E. Smith, a.k.a. Jack O'Brien, left the major market race after great stints at KOMA, Oklahoma City; WFUN, Miami; and WRKO, Boston; to come home, and brought his golden tone to Cutie in 1976. Jack then went to competitor WALG, as program director.

The station was on the air in the 1970s as WQDE, owned by Dave and Virgie McGriff. In 1978, it was called 1250Q The Radio Station. Programmed by Tom Clay, with a morning show entitled "3 Speed and Sneakers" (Tom Clay and Beau Stone) playing AC music.

WQDE became WANL on August 31, 1987, playing inspirational music and called the "Voice Of Praise". Owned by Jimmy Keyton of Life Line Ministries, the program director was Wyne Peron. On July 1, 2002, the station changed its call sign to the current WSRA.
