= WQVR =

- Webster, Massachusetts; United States
- Broadcast area: Worcester County, Massachusetts; Northern Rhode Island; Northeastern Connecticut
- Frequency: 940 kHz
- Branding: 940 AM and 99.3 FM WQVR

Programming
- Format: Classic hits

Ownership
- Owner: Kurt Jackson; (Quinebaug Valley Broadcasting, LLC)
- Sister stations: WQVD; WARE; WATR

History
- First air date: March 29, 1980
- Former call signs: WGFP (1979–2022)
- Call sign meaning: "Quinebaug Valley Radio"

Technical information
- Licensing authority: FCC
- Facility ID: 50232
- Class: D
- Power: 1,000 watts day; 4 watts night
- Transmitter coordinates: 42°3′17.35″N 71°49′57.26″W
- Translator: 99.3 W257EH (Webster)

Links
- Public license information: Public file; LMS
- Webcast: Listen live
- Website: wqvrradio.com

WQVR (940 AM) is a radio station broadcasting a classic hits format. Licensed to Webster, Massachusetts, United States, the station serves the Worcester area. The station is owned by Kurt Jackson, through licensee Quinebaug Valley Broadcasting, LLC. Its programming is also heard on translator station W257EH (99.3 FM).

By day, WQVR transmits with 1,000 watts, but because 940 AM is a Canadian and Mexican clear channel frequency, WQVR reduces power at night to only four watts to avoid interference.

WQVR serves Southern Worcester County, Northern Rhode Island and Northeastern Connecticut. WQVR also provides the area with local high school sports coverage.

== History ==
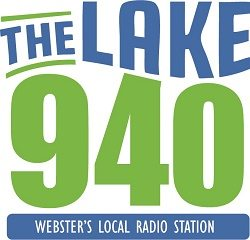
Logo as "The Lake 940"

Lakeview Broadcasting Company was granted a construction permit for a new station on 940 kHz in Webster, Massachusetts, on March 5, 1979; two months later, on May 7, the call sign WGFP was issued. The call sign stood for Gilbert Francis Perry, a relative of the original owner.

For several years now, WGFP had been operating from a long wire antenna instead of a tower. On the site of the AM tower rests an experimental tower, WX1CFA, using a "crossed field" design.

On December 29, 2017, WGFP changed formats to classic hits as “The Lake 940”. The station previously broadcast a country format as "Cool Country 940".

Just Because, Inc. sold WGFP to Quinebaug Valley Broadcasting for $75,000 effective September 29, 2022; principal Kurt Jackson is a part-owner of WARE in nearby Ware. On October 5, 2022, the new owners applied to change the call sign to WQVR, effective October 11.

== Translator ==
Call sign	Frequency	City of license	FID	ERP (W)	Class	Transmitter coordinates	FCC info
W257EH	99.3 FM	Webster, Massachusetts	201540	250	D	42°2′16″N 71°59′18″W	LMS
