= Simon Geller =

Simon Geller (March 16, 1920 - July 11, 1995) was an American classical music station radio personality who ran a one-man radio station in Gloucester, Massachusetts.

== Early life ==
Geller was born March 16, 1920, in Lowell, Massachusetts, the eldest of four sons born to Benjamin Geller and Nellie Siegel. He was raised in the Jewish faith and spent his childhood in Lowell, Wolfeboro, New Hampshire, and then Boston.

== Radio career ==
Geller was a radio engineer in New York City, Boston and New Jersey before starting his own station in 1964. The station, WVCA-FM initially operated with a Top 40 music format. However, as FM was still burgeoning and few listeners had compatible receivers, it did not prosper. By 1967, Geller transitioned to a classical music format and slowly did away with his staff. This new incarnation of WVCA was on the air for thirteen hours a day, seven days a week, and operated out of Geller's apartment. He was known for his eccentric style, which included taking bathroom breaks during live broadcasts, shutting down the station to run errands, and his frequent on-air diatribes, either aimed at the FCC or pleas to his listeners for financial support to sustain the station's operation.

=== Legal battles over license ===
In 1982 the U.S. Federal Communications Commission (FCC) voted not to renew Geller's operating license because he did not meet requirements for broadcasting non-entertainment programming and ascertaining community needs. The license was awarded to the Grandbanke Corporation, which had been challenging Geller's license since 1974. In 1984 a Federal Court of Appeals ordered the FCC to reconsider its ruling, citing "serious First Amendment concerns" and concerns over the FCC departing "from its own precedents" in comparing competitors for the license. In 1985 Geller's license was renewed.

== Later life ==
In 1988 Geller retired from radio, selling his station for $1 million. At that time he had 90,000 listeners. After retiring Geller moved to the Upper West Side of New York City, where health issues kept him essentially isolated in his home.

In 1990 a short film, Radio Fishtown, directed by Henry Ferrini, was made about Geller's life and career.

Geller never married and had no children. He died on July 11, 1995, at the age of 75. Geller is buried at Judean Memorial Gardens in Olney, Maryland.
