= WAZN =

- Watertown, Massachusetts; United States
- Broadcast area: Greater Boston
- Frequency: 1470 kHz
- Branding: Radio Oasis 1470 AM Boston

Programming
- Language: Spanish
- Format: Christian radio

Ownership
- Owner: Multicultural Broadcasting; (Multicultural Radio Broadcasting Licensee, LLC)
- Sister stations: WLYN

History
- First air date: January 1958 (as WSRO in Marlborough, Massachusetts)
- Former call signs: WSRO (1958–2002)
- Call sign meaning: "Asian" (previous programming)

Technical information
- Licensing authority: FCC
- Facility ID: 70523
- Class: B
- Power: 1,400 watts (day); 3,400 watts (night)
- Transmitter coordinates: 42°24′49.35″N 71°12′38.2″W

Links
- Public license information: Public file; LMS
- Webcast: Listen live
- Website: www.radiooasisboston.com

WAZN (1470 AM) is a radio station in the Greater Boston market, licensed to Watertown. It is owned by Multicultural Broadcasting, and as of March 27, 2020 broadcasts Spanish Christian programming.

== History ==
The station signed on in January 1958 as WSRO, operating out of Marlborough.

At one time, WSRO was a music station. Additionally, at one time, the station was simulcast in Gardner on WGAW (1340 AM). However, in 1996, the station filed for bankruptcy, and was sold separately from WGAW in October. The new ownership gradually shifted the station to more of a talk radio format the following year.

WSRO was sold to Alex Langer in 1998. In early 1999, the station let go much of its staff and became a full-time relay of sister station WRPT (650 AM); soon afterward, the station lost its original transmitter location in Marlborough and relocated to a temporary site in Hudson. In October 2000, WSRO applied to move to Watertown, operating from a transmitter location in Lexington.

The station was sold to Multicultural in 2002. The callsign was soon changed to WAZN, as the WSRO callsign remained with Langer on 650 AM. The move to Watertown was completed by Multicultural in early 2004. The station began broadcasting Chinese programming on February 1, 2016, and later moved to Spanish Christan format on March 27, 2020.
