= WWFX =

- Southbridge, Massachusetts; United States
- Broadcast area: Worcester, Massachusetts
- Frequency: 100.1 MHz
- Branding: 100 FM The Pike

Programming
- Format: Classic rock
- Affiliations: New England Patriots Radio Network

Ownership
- Owner: Cumulus Media; (Radio License Holding CBC, LLC)
- Sister stations: WORC-FM; WXLO

History
- First air date: November 1, 1968 (as WESO-FM)
- Former call signs: WESO-FM (1968–1979); WQVR (1979–1999)
- Call sign meaning: "Worcester's Fox" (former branding)

Technical information
- Licensing authority: FCC
- Facility ID: 18310
- Class: A
- ERP: 2,850 watts
- HAAT: 146 meters (479 ft)
- Transmitter coordinates: 42.225°N 71.880°W

Links
- Public license information: Public file; LMS
- Webcast: Listen live
- Website: www.pikefm.com

WWFX (100.1 FM; "100 FM The Pike") is a classic rock radio station serving the Worcester vicinity. It is under ownership of Cumulus Media. WWFX is also an affiliate of the New England Patriots Radio Network.

== History ==
The station signed on November 1, 1968, as WESO-FM, sister station to WESO. In 1979, the station's call letters changed to WQVR, and before long it had become country station "Q100". In February 1999, under the new ownership of Wilks Broadcasting, the station changed format to classic hits, taking on the call letters WWFX. The station became an affiliate of the syndicated The Bob & Tom Show and changed its name to "100.1 The Fox". That December, the station was sold to Citadel Broadcasting for $14.25 million. The first on-air personalities at The Fox (other than Bob & Tom) were: "Zip" Zipfel, Moneen Daley and program director Dave Hilton.

In January 2003, the station dropped Bob & Tom and took on an active rock format while keeping the name "The Fox" but identifying as "Worcester's Rock Station". That would be short lived, as in November 2004 the station changed format back to classic hits, retaining the WWFX call letters but changing its name to "100 FM The Pike" and ditching its airstaff for a jockless approach. This structure would last just over three years before, at the start of 2008, "the Pike" hired its first live on-air personality, longtime Providence broadcaster "Cruisin Bruce Palmer" (formerly of WWBB). Palmer was initially teamed with former Fox staffer Chris Engel to create a music-intensive morning show. Engel would be replaced six months later by current WORC-FM morning show host Adam Webster, providing news updates on Palmer's daily show.

Citadel merged with Cumulus Media on September 16, 2011.

In March 2014, Cumulus Media hired Chuck Perks as the program director and midday personality. Lance Ballance was added as afternoon host in July 2014. Former Boston radio personality Keith Stephens replaced Ballance as afternoon host in March 2017. Mike Adams "The Planet Mikey Show" replaced Keith Stephens in 2020.

On February 22, 2021, WWFX shifted its format from classic hits to classic rock.
