= WATR =

Radio station in Waterbury, Connecticut, United States

- Waterbury, Connecticut; United States
- Broadcast area: Central Naugatuck Valley
- Frequency: 1320 kHz
- Branding: WOW Radio CT

Programming
- Format: Classic hits; full-service radio
- Affiliations: ABC News Radio

Ownership
- Owner: David Webster and Kurt Jackson; (WATR Radio, LLC)
- Sister stations: WARE; WRYM; WWCO

History
- First air date: June 15, 1934
- Call sign meaning: Waterbury

Technical information
- Licensing authority: FCC
- Facility ID: 71102
- Class: B
- Power: 5,000 watts (day); 1,000 watts (night)
- Transmitter coordinates: 41°32′12.35″N 73°1′50.39″W
- Translator: 97.7 W249DY (Waterbury)

Links
- Public license information: Public file; LMS
- Webcast: Listen live
- Website: www.wowradioct.com

WATR (1320 AM) is a radio station licensed to serve Waterbury, Connecticut, and the Naugatuck Valley. The station is owned and operated by David Webster and Kurt Jackson through WATR Radio, LLC, and broadcasts the internet radio station, WOW Radio as a full service, and a classic hits format. It was until May 2022 the oldest privately owned station in the state of Connecticut, never having been sold outside the family of its founder, Harold Thomas (1902–1968).

WATR broadcasts with 5,000 watts by day, at night it lowers power to 1,000 watts to protect other stations on 1320 AM. The station is also heard on 250-watt FM translator W249DY at 97.7 in Waterbury.

== History ==
The station has been assigned the WATR call letters by the Federal Communications Commission since it was initially licensed in 1934.

WATR once had sister television and FM stations: WATR-TV (now WCCT-TV), established in 1953, and WATR-FM (now WWYZ), established in 1961.

The station was also home to the "Polish Eagle Show", originated in 1934 on WATR by bandleader Victor Zembruski (1912–1976). His widow, Sophie Zembruski (1918–2010), hosted the show from 1976 to 2008, at which time the couple's daughter, Loretta Hoxie, took over hosting duties. "The Zembruski Family Polka Hour", hosted by Nathaniel Zembruski, succeeded Hoxie shortly after she retired in 2013. Zembruski, at age 17, decided to end the show as his junior year of high school concluded. Its finale aired on May 31, 2020.

The station also maintains a decades-long tradition of broadcasting play-by-play of local high school football and basketball. WATR was a member of the University of Connecticut sports radio network from 2018 to 2023.

It was announced on February 24, 2020, that the station was up for sale. A partnership between WWCO owner David Webster and WARE owner Kurt Jackson purchased the station and translator W249DY effective August 24, 2022, for $320,000.

On June 2, 2025, the station began a partnership with internet-based "WOW Radio", with studios located inside "Toyota of Wallingford", a car dealership in Wallingford, Connecticut.

== Translator ==
Broadcast translator for WATR
Call sign	Frequency	City of license	FID	ERP (W)	Class	Transmitter coordinates	FCC info
W249DY	97.7 FM	Waterbury, Connecticut	203226	250	D	41°33′47.3″N 72°50′40.3″W	LMS
