= WATD-FM =

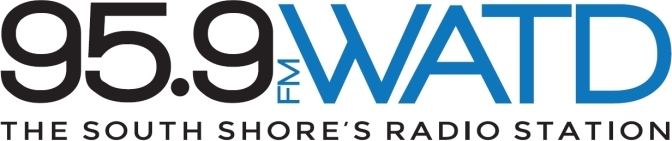
- Marshfield, Massachusetts; United States
- Broadcast area: South Shore
- Frequency: 95.9 MHz
- Branding: 95.9 WATD

Programming
- Format: Full service adult contemporary
- Affiliations: ABC News Radio

Ownership
- Owner: Marshfield Broadcasting Co., Inc.

History
- First air date: December 6, 1977
- Former call signs: WATD (1977–1985)
- Call sign meaning: '"We're At The Dump"

Technical information
- Licensing authority: FCC
- Facility ID: 40468
- Class: A
- ERP: 1,600 watts
- HAAT: 143 meters (469 ft)
- Transmitter coordinates: 42°6′39.4″N 70°42′15.1″W

Links
- Public license information: Public file; LMS
- Webcast: Listen live
- Website: 959watd.com

WATD-FM (95.9 MHz) is a radio station carrying local news and features for the South Shore of Massachusetts (comprising Norfolk and Plymouth counties), with an adult contemporary music format. Founded and owned by local entrepreneur Edward Perry and licensed to Marshfield, Massachusetts, the station went live on December 6, 1977.

== Programming ==
WATD-FM airs a news program in morning drive on weekdays, with features from ABC News Radio. Adult contemporary hits from the 1960s to today predominate in the midday hours and in afternoon drive on weekdays, while oldies, classic alternative, jazz, and talk shows fill the rest of the programming week. WATD-FM's midday and afternoon music programming featured a classic hits format until 2012, when the addition of current music shifted the format to adult contemporary. It was later added to the Nielsen BDS AC indicator panel. WATD-FM is one of three AC stations in the Boston market, along with WMJX and WPLM-FM.

Much of WATD-FM's programming was simulcast by WBMS (1460 AM) and FM translator station W266DA (101.1) in Brockton, Massachusetts, a station which Marshfield Broadcasting acquired in 2015 and held the callsign WATD (AM) from 2016 to 2019. WBMS was sold in 2024.

WATD-FM also carries live broadcasts of local high-school football and boys' basketball games involving high schools in the station's coverage area. WATD-FM has previously broadcast some high-school hockey playoff games over the course of many years.
