= WSAR =

- Fall River, Massachusetts; United States
- Broadcast area: Southcoast Massachusetts
- Frequency: 1480 kHz
- Branding: 1480 WSAR

Programming
- Format: News/talk/sports
- Affiliations: ABC News Radio; Fox News Radio; Fox Sports Radio; Genesis Communications Network; USA Radio Network; Boston Celtics; Boston Red Sox; New England Patriots

Ownership
- Owner: Jim & Bob Karam; (Bristol County Broadcasting, Inc.)

History
- First air date: June 20, 1923 (test broadcast); July 3, 1923 (first license)
- Call sign meaning: Randomly assigned from sequential list

Technical information
- Licensing authority: FCC
- Facility ID: 6879
- Class: B
- Power: 5,000 watts unlimited
- Transmitter coordinates: 41°43′26.37″N 71°11′19.17″W
- Translator: 95.9 W240EB (Fall River))

Links
- Public license information: Public file; LMS
- Webcast: Listen Live
- Website: wsar.com

WSAR (1480 AM) is a commercial radio station licensed to Fall River, Massachusetts. Its studios and transmitter site are located in Somerset, Massachusetts. Its transmitter power output is 5,000 watts unlimited hours, using two towers in a fulltime directional pattern.

WSAR is rebroadcast on 95.9 FM by translator station W240EB, which was first licensed February 5, 2020.

== Programming ==
WSAR's format is news/talk and sports. It used to be a full-service music station playing top 40 music. It carries live game coverage for the Boston Red Sox, New England Patriots and the Boston Celtics.

== History ==
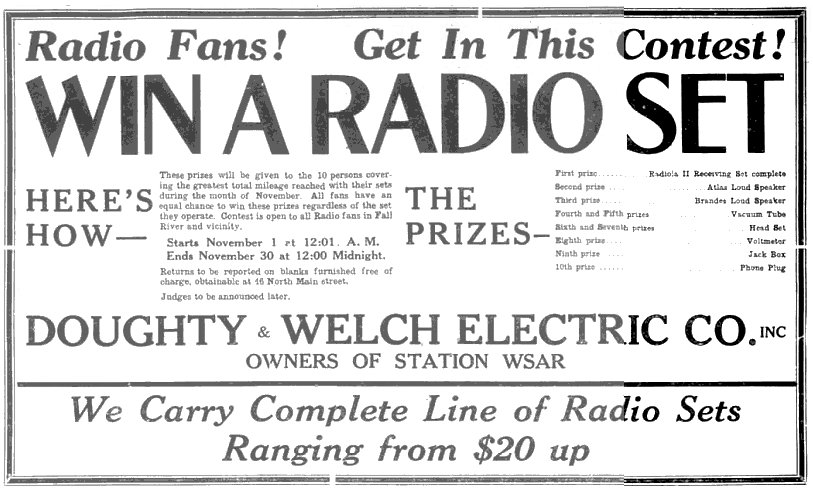
WSAR was founded in 1923 by the Doughty & Welch Electric Co., which remained the licensee until 1944.

WSAR was first licensed on July 3, 1923, to the Doughty & Welch Electric Company in Fall River, on 1180 kHz with 10 watts. The call letters were randomly assigned from a sequential roster of available call signs. (Some station histories list a start date of September 21, 1921, however this is inconsistent with contemporary records, and Doughty & Welch later described a June 20, 1923 test transmission as the "first Fall River broadcast of radio music".) In 1924, power was increased to 100 watts. In 1926, WSAR's slogan was reported to be the town's traditional "Fall River Looms Up".

Beginning in mid-1926, there was a period when adverse legal decisions led to the U.S. government temporarily losing its authority to assign transmitting frequencies. Taking advantage of this lapse, WSAR was reported to be on a self-assigned frequency of around 930 kHz as of December 31, 1926.

In 1927, following the restoration of government authority by the creation of the Federal Radio Commission (FRC), WSAR was assigned to 1190 kHz. The station briefly moved to Portsmouth, Rhode Island, before returning to Fall River. Toward the end of the year, the station was assigned to 1410 kHz, and on November 11, 1928, based on the guidelines of the FRC's General Order 40, was assigned to 1450 kHz with 250 watts. In 1937 the power was increased to 1,000 watts.

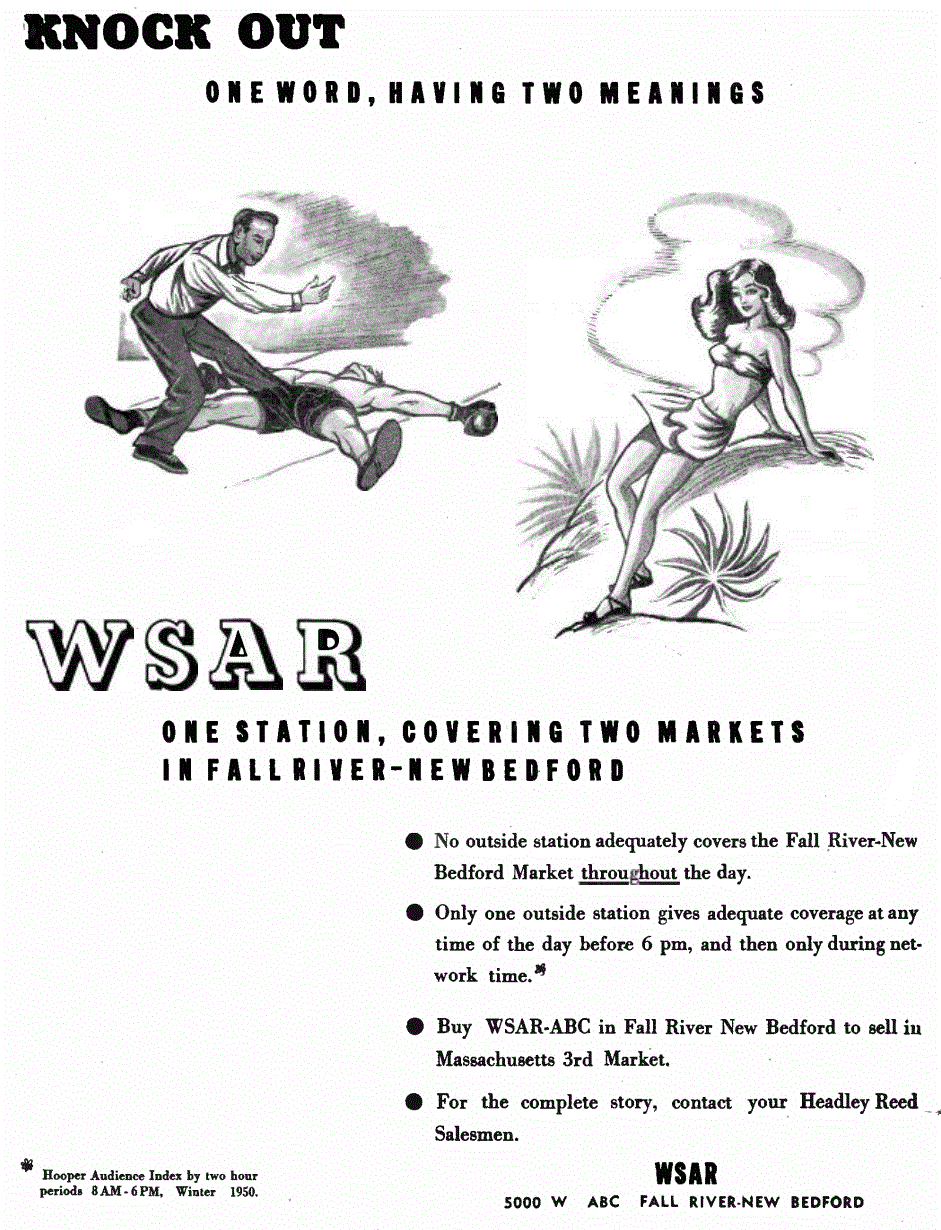
Although licensed to Fall River, WSAR also served New Bedford (1951).

With the implementation of the North American Regional Broadcasting Agreement, effective 3:00 am. Eastern Time on March 29, 1941, the stations on 1450 kHz, including WSAR, were moved to 1480 kHz. In 1941–42 WSAR was an affiliate of the Boston Red Sox and Boston Braves networks. In 1944, the Doughty & Welch Electric Company sold WSAR to The Fall River Broadcasting Company.

In 1946 the owners were issued a construction permit for WSAR-FM on 96.5 MHz, which was later changed to 103.7 MHz. This station began making broadcasts under an "interim operation" authorization, but was deleted on April 18, 1949, due to an inability to acquire "a satisfactory FM audience" and "lack of interest in FM and rapid growth of television".

In 1948, WSAR was a Mutual affiliate with 5,000 watts of power.

WSAR was sold by Knight Quality Stations to the current owners in 1989.

Paul Giammarco took over as program director and afternoon host in 2003. In 2005 he left for WPRO with Keri Rodrigues taking his position until her tenure ended in August 2008. Rodrigues' afternoon drive seat was filled by then-production director "Fast" Eddie Garcia and sports-talk personality "The Hurricane" Mike Herren. The role of program director was handled by several people, including Patrick Stone, who exited for a marketing post with Bristol Community College in Fall River, and then at Rhode Island Community College in 2017.

After several on-air confrontations, Fast Eddie and the Hurricane was disbanded, with Herren remaining as the afternoon drive host, and Garcia returning full-time to producing. The new program was dubbed The Hurricane's Highway Home, with Herren adding co-host Ryan Phelan. Phelan left the station in the spring of 2010 after accepting a position with Bristol Eighth District Mike Rodrigues' State Senate campaign to replace the retiring Joan Menard. Herren's program was cancelled soon after.

Late in the summer of 2008, WSAR remodeled its webpage, adding streaming audio, mobile streaming, and podcasts of interviews, newscasts and special programming.

In summer 2012, Giammarco returned to WSAR, this time as general manager and program director, the first PD since Rodrigues, who had moved on to be a union organizer with the SEIU in Boston. Giammarco left in October 2012. Long-time on-air host and newspaper journalist, Ric Oliveira, left his post at Gatehouse Media where he was publisher of O Jornal and became general manager on April 1, 2013. The station added a Braga Bridge Cam in August 2013 and studio cameras to the webpage. WSAR also began using Facebook in 2013, using Facebook Live in 2016 as a means towards enhancing coverage of Fall River City Council and School Committee Sessions.

On January 28, 2015, WSAR was granted a U.S. Federal Communications Commission construction permit to increase day power to 25,000 watts by adding a third tower one-half the height of the two existing towers.

Jennifer Lorenzo assumed news director and production director duties after Barry Richard was let go in 2016; Lorenzo arrived from WHBC in Canton, Ohio, in 2013. Lorenzo exited in March 2016 for a communications post at the Bristol County Chamber of Commerce.

== FM translator ==
WSAR is rebroadcast on the FM band by translator station W240EB, which was first licensed February 5, 2020.

Broadcast translator for WSAR
Call sign	Frequency	City of license	FID	ERP (W)	HAAT	Class	Transmitter coordinates	FCC info
W240EB	95.9 FM	Fall River, Massachusetts	202219	250	0 m (0 ft)	D	41°43′27.4″N 71°11′19.2″W	LMS

== Notable alumni ==
- Doug Brown, former sports anchor now at ESPN Radio
- Leslie Marshall: former intern, nationally syndicated talk-show host
- Mark Williams: former overnight air personality, Sacramento-based talk show host and author
