= WGAW =

- Gardner, Massachusetts; United States
- Broadcast area: Montachusett-North County
- Frequency: 1340 kHz
- Branding: WGAW1340.com

Programming
- Format: Talk
- Affiliations: Fox News Radio; ABC News Radio; Genesis Communications Network; Premiere Networks; Salem Radio Network; USA Radio Network; Westwood One

Ownership
- Owner: Steven Wendell

History
- First air date: December 23, 1946
- Former call signs: WHOB (1946–1953)
- Call sign meaning: Gardner, Athol, Winchendon

Technical information
- Licensing authority: FCC
- Facility ID: 72088
- Class: C
- Power: 1,000 watts unlimited
- Transmitter coordinates: 42°35′33.32″N 71°59′18.28″W
- Translator: 98.1 W251CQ (Gardner)

Links
- Public license information: Public file; LMS
- Website: www.wgaw1340.com

WGAW (1340 AM) is a radio station licensed to Gardner, Massachusetts. Established in 1946 as WHOB, the station is owned by Steven Wendell and carries a talk radio format.

== History ==
The station signed on December 23, 1946, as WHOB. It debuted at 1490 kHz on the AM dial, and the call letters referred to one of the station's founders, District Attorney Owen A. Hoban. WHOB was originally owned by David M. Richman, a Connecticut businessman; studios were in the Colonial Hotel in Gardner. The station's format was a variety of local news, music, and sports. One of the early stars on WHOB was a local country (then called "hillbilly") music performer named Doc Snow (real name: Edgar Arsenault). He performed live with his band, the Bar X Cowboys, and later became one of the station's announcers.

The station was sold to Emilien R. Robillard, a pharmacist, in 1954; the call letters were changed to WGAW (Gardner, Athol, Winchendon) on October 14, 1953. Subsequently, in 1957, the station was sold again, to Charles and James Asher, who also owned WJDA in Quincy. In 1959, new owners again took over, with Judge C. Edward Rowe purchasing the station.

By the early 1990s, WGAW was experiencing financial problems due to increased competition from FM stations. The station was being run by Judge Rowe's son Douglas, who also owned WSRO, a station in Marlboro, Massachusetts. To save money, WGAW was no longer doing local broadcasting. Rather, it was simulcasting the programming of WSRO. Subsequent owners of WGAW have included Anastos Media Group of Malta, New York (an ownership group headed by New York City television news anchor Ernie Anastos), and Northeast Broadcasting of Bedford, New Hampshire.

In the 2000s, there was a shift to a greater local focus with the most major change occurring when broadcaster and newsman Steve Wendell purchased the station in 2012. Wendell adopted a “Live and Local” philosophy and streamlined the news/talk format and added a dedicated Morning News slot which now features America’s First News with Gordon Deal from 5-6am weekdays and the Morning News with Steve Wendell from 6am to 9am weekdays. Also popular on the station is the "Hotline Radio Show" which airs Saturdays from noon to 2pm and features local interviews, reports, and commentary. The station is heard on AM 1340, 98.1 FM, and streams worldwide.

== Translator ==
Call sign	Frequency	City of license	FID	ERP (W)	Class	Transmitter coordinates	FCC info
W251CQ	98.1 FM	Gardner, Massachusetts	201705	250 vertical; 0 horizontial	D	42°35′28.3″N 71°59′18.2″W	LMS
