= WGAM =

Radio station in Manchester, New Hampshire

WGAM and WGHM

WGAM: Manchester, New Hampshire; WGHM: Nashua, New Hampshire; United States
- Broadcast area: Merrimack Valley
- Frequencies: WGAM: 1250 kHz; WGHM: 900 kHz
- Branding: Oldies Radio WGAM

Programming
- Format: Oldies
- Affiliations: ABC News Radio

Ownership
- Owner: Absolute Broadcasting, LLC

History
- First air date: WGAM: October 2, 1946; WGHM: March 23, 1992
- Former call signs: WGAM: WKBR (1946–2007); WGHM: WMVU (1992–2002); WOTW (2002–2003); WSNH (2003–2006); WGAM (2006–2007)
- Call sign meaning: "The Game" (former branding)

Technical information
- Licensing authority: FCC
- Facility ID: WGAM: 57088; WGHM: 41256
- Class: WGAM: D; WGHM: D
- Power: WGAM: 670 watts day; 100 watts night; WGHM: 910 watts day; 60 watts night
- Transmitter coordinates: WGAM: 43°0′38.3″N 71°30′13.25″W; WGHM: 42°45′34.32″N 71°28′35.24″W
- Translator(s): WGAM: 103.5 W278CJ (Manchester); WGHM: 99.9 W260DB (Nashua)

Links
- Public license information: WGAM: Public file; LMS; WGHM: Public file; LMS
- Webcast: Listen live (via Live365); Listen live (via MP3)
- Website: wgamfm.com

WGAM (1250 AM) and WGHM (900 AM) are simulcasting radio stations in southern New Hampshire, United States, broadcasting an oldies format named "Oldies Radio WGAM". WGAM is licensed to serve Manchester, and WGHM is licensed to serve Nashua. The stations are locally owned by Absolute Broadcasting, LLC. The stations are also available via FM translators at 103.5 in Manchester and 99.9 in Nashua.

== History ==
=== WGAM ===
Initial "The Game" logo, used from March 2006 until October 2009.

WGAM was previously known as WKBR, which had been a popular Top 40 music station in earlier decades, then switched to carrying One on One Sports and a country music format then finally satellite delivered oldies. On March 20, 2006, the station switched to sports radio with the slogan New Hampshire Sports Radio, WGAM, The Game. Initially affiliated with Fox Sports Radio, the station switched to ESPN Radio in October 2009.

On July 3, 2017, WGAM and WGHM changed their format from ESPN sports to oldies, branded as "Oldies Radio WGAM".

=== WGHM ===
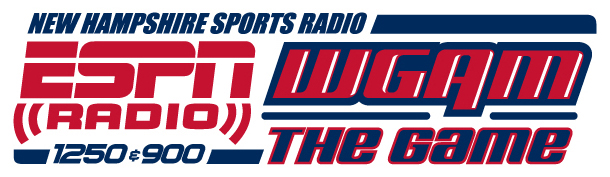
Logo from October 2009 (following the switch to ESPN Radio) until the rebrand to "ESPN New Hampshire" in 2012.

In the late 1990s and early 2000s, the station flipped formats several times, including oldies, both on their own and simulcasting WMEX from Farmington, New Hampshire. In 2004 the station carried Nashua Pride baseball games. Previous to the simulcast with WGAM, the station held the WGAM calls and carried ESPN Radio, however the network changed to Fox Sports Radio in 2006 and Absolute moved the WGAM calls to the more powerful 1250 frequency. Previous to the ESPN format, the station's call letters were WSNH. Other call signs held are WMVU and WOTW.

=== Shows ===
WGAM featured ESPN Radio programming such as Mike and Mike in the Morning, along with The Dan Patrick Show and some local programming; the station was also an affiliate for Boston Red Sox games, Boston Bruins games, Notre Dame Football games and Westwood One sports programming. Starting September 15, 2014, WGAM added former WEEI-FM host Glenn Ordway's SiriusXM show "Big Show Unfiltered" weekdays at 3 p.m. After Ordway ended his show, the station returned to locally produced sports talk in the afternoons, early evenings and weekends. The station was known for devoting many hours per week covering local high school sports with play by play of individual games as well as a weekly compilation show featuring up to a dozen correspondents reporting live from high school games across the state. Several station alumni went on to prominent sports broadcasting careers including Mike Mutnansky, Rich Keefe and Christian Arcand on Boston's WEEI-FM.

== Translators ==
Call sign	Frequency	City of license	FID	ERP (W)	Class	Transmitter coordinates	FCC info	Notes
W278CJ	103.5 FM	Manchester, New Hampshire	138757	250	D	43°0′38″N 71°30′13″W	LMS	Relays WGAM
W260DB	99.9 FM	Nashua, New Hampshire	83187	250	D	42°45′34.3″N 71°28′35.2″W	LMS	Relays WGHM
