= List of radio stations in Massachusetts =

The following is a list of the FCC-licensed radio stations in the United States Commonwealth of Massachusetts, which can be sorted by their call signs, frequencies, cities of license, licensees, and programming formats.

== List of radio stations ==
Call sign	Frequency	City of license	Licensee	Format
WACE	730 AM	Chicopee	Holy Family Communications	Catholic
WACF-LP	98.1 FM	Brookfield	A.P.P.L.E. Seed, Inc.	Variety
WACM	1270 AM	Springfield	Red Wolf Broadcasting Corporation	Rhythmic contemporary
WAEM-LP	94.9 FM	Acton	Town of Acton, Massachusetts	Variety
WAIC	91.9 FM	Springfield	American International College	Classical
WAIY-LP	107.7 FM	Belchertown	Dwight Chapel Inc.	Religious Teaching
WAMG	890 AM	Dedham	Gois Broadcasting Boston LLC	Spanish
WAMH	89.3 FM	Amherst	Trustees of Amherst College	College radio
WAMQ	105.1 FM	Great Barrington	WAMC	Public radio
WAQY	102.1 FM	Springfield	Saga Communications of New England, LLC	Classic rock
WARA	1320 AM	Attleboro	Attleboro Access Cable Systems, Inc.	Community radio
WARE	1250 AM	Ware	Success Signal Broadcasting, Inc.	Classic hits
WATD-FM	95.9 FM	Marshfield	Marshfield Broadcasting Co., Inc.	Adult contemporary
WAVM	91.7 FM	Maynard	Maynard School Committee	High school radio
WAZK	97.7 FM	Nantucket	Nantucket Radio, LLC	Adult album alternative
WAZN	1470 AM	Watertown	Multicultural Radio Broadcasting Licensee, LLC	Ethnic
WBCA-LP	102.9 FM	Boston	City of Boston	Community radio
WBCR-LP	97.7 FM	Great Barrington	Berkshire Community Radio Alliance	Community radio
WBEC	1420 AM	Pittsfield	Townsquare License, LLC	News Talk Information
WBEC-FM	95.9 FM	Pittsfield	Townsquare License, LLC	Adult top 40
WBGB	103.3 FM	Boston	Audacy License, LLC	Adult hits
WBIM-FM	91.5 FM	Bridgewater	Bridgewater State College	College radio, Alternative
WBIX	1260 AM	Boston	International Church of the Grace of God, Inc.	Portuguese
WBMS	1460 AM	Brockton	Marshfield Broadcasting Co., Inc.	Adult contemporary
WBMT	88.3 FM	Boxford	Masconomet Regional School System	Album-oriented rock
WBNU-LP	102.9 FM	Framingham	St. Stephen Parish Framingham Educational Radio Association	Spanish Religious
WBNW	1120 AM	Concord	Money Matters Radio, Inc.	Business Talk
WBOS	92.9 FM	Brookline	Beasley Media Group, LLC	Financial news
WBPG-LP	102.9 FM	Dorchester	Global Ministries Christian Church	Urban Gospel
WBPR	91.9 FM	Worcester	University of Massachusetts	Adult album alternative
WBQT	96.9 FM	Boston	Beasley Media Group, LLC	Rhythmic Hot AC
WBRK	1340 AM	Pittsfield	WBRK, Inc.	Classic hits
WBRK-FM	101.7 FM	Pittsfield	WBRK, Inc.	Hot adult contemporary
WBRS	100.1 FM	Waltham	Brandeis University	College radio
WBSL-FM	91.7 FM	Sheffield	The Berkshire School, Inc.	High school radio
WBSM	1420 AM	New Bedford	Townsquare License, LLC	Talk
WBUA	92.7 FM	Tisbury	The Trustees of Boston University	Public radio
WBUH	89.1 FM	Brewster	Trustees of Boston University	Public radio
WBUR-FM	90.9 FM	Boston	The Trustees of Boston University	News/Talk
WBWL	101.7 FM	Lynn	iHM Licenses, LLC	Country
WBZ	1030 AM	Boston	iHM Licenses, LLC	News/Talk
WBZ-FM	98.5 FM	Boston	Beasley Media Group Licenses, LLC	Sports (FSR)
WCAI	90.1 FM	Woods Hole	WGBH Educational Foundation	Public radio
WCAP	980 AM	Lowell	Merrimack Valley Radio, LLC	Talk/Oldies
WCCH	103.5 FM	Holyoke	Holyoke Community College	College radio
WCCM	1490 AM	Haverhill	Costa-Eagle Radio Ventures Limited Partnership	Spanish CHR
WCDV-LP	89.3 FM	Lynn	Iglesia Christiana Torrente de Cedron	Spanish religious
WCFM	91.9 FM	Williamstown	The President & Trustees of Williams College	College radio
WCHC	88.1 FM	Worcester	College of the Holy Cross	College radio
WCIB	101.9 FM	Falmouth	iHM Licenses, LLC	Oldies
WCMX	1000 AM	Leominster	Horizon Christian Fellowship	Christian
WCOD-FM	106.1 FM	Hyannis	iHM Licenses, LLC	Hot adult contemporary
WCRB	99.5 FM	Lowell	WGBH Educational Foundation	Classical
WCRN	830 AM	Worcester	Carter Broadcasting Corporation	Talk
WCTK	98.1 FM	New Bedford	Hall Communications, Inc.	Country Music
WCUW	91.3 FM	Worcester	WUW, Inc.	Educational
WDJM-FM	91.3 FM	Framingham	Framingham State College	College radio
WEEI	850 AM	Boston	Audacy License, LLC	Sports gambling (BetQL/ISN)
WEEI-FM	93.7 FM	Lawrence	Audacy License, LLC	Sports (ISN)
WEIB	106.3 FM	Northampton	Cutting Edge Broadcasting, Inc.	New AC (NAC)/Smooth jazz
WEII	96.3 FM	Dennis	iHM Licenses, LLC	Sports (ESPN)
WERS	88.9 FM	Boston	Emerson College	Adult Album Alternative
WESO	970 AM	Southbridge	Emmanuel Communications, Inc.	Catholic
WESX	1230 AM	Salem	Real Media Group, LLC	Ethnic
WEZE	590 AM	Boston	Caron Broadcasting, Inc.	Religion
WKCC	107.5 FM	Chatham	Educational Media Foundation	Contemporary Christian (K-Love)
WFCR	88.5 FM	Amherst	University of Massachusetts	Public radio
WFGL	960 AM	Fitchburg	Horizon Christian Fellowship	Christian
WFHL	88.1 FM	New Bedford	New Bedford Christian Radio, Inc.	Ethnic
WFHN	107.1 FM	Fairhaven	Townsquare License, LLC	Rhythmic contemporary hit radio
WFMR	91.3 FM	Orleans	Lower Cape Communications, Inc.	Community radio
WFNX-LP	101.3 FM	Scituate	Scituate Community Radio, Inc	Community Radio
WFPB	1170 AM	Orleans	University of Massachusetts	Adult album alternative
WFPB-FM	91.9 FM	Falmouth	University of Massachusetts	Adult album alternative
WFPR-LP	102.9 FM	Franklin	Franklin Community Cable Access, Inc.	Variety
WFRQ	93.5 FM	Harwich Port	Coxswain Media LLC	Adult hits
WGAO	88.3 FM	Franklin	Dean College	College radio
WGAW	1340 AM	Gardner	County Broadcasting Company, LLC	News/talk
WGBH	89.7 FM	Boston	WGBH Educational Foundation	Public radio
WGTX	1240 AM	West Yarmouth	Bob Bittner Broadcasting, Inc.	Classic hits
WGTX-FM	102.3 FM	Truro	GCJH Inc.	Classic hits
WGUA-LP	98.1 FM	Lawrence	St. Patrick Parish Lawrence Educational Radio Association	Spanish Catholic
WHAB	89.1 FM	Acton	Acton-Boxborough Regional School District	High school radio
WHAI	98.3 FM	Greenfield	Saga Communications of New England, LLC	Adult contemporary
WHAV-LP	97.9 FM	Haverhill	Public Media of New England, Inc.	Variety
WHHB	99.9 FM	Holliston	Holliston High School	High school radio
WHLL	1450 AM	Springfield	Audacy License, LLC	Spanish music
WHMP	1400 AM	Northampton	Saga Communications of New England, LLC	News/talk
WHRB	95.3 FM	Cambridge	Harvard Radio Broadcasting Co., Inc.	College radio
WHTB	1400 AM	Fall River	RVDE, LLC	Portuguese
WHYA	101.1 FM	Mashpee	Coxswain Media LLC	Top 40 (CHR)
WHYN	560 AM	Springfield	iHM Licenses, LLC	News/talk
WHYN-FM	93.1 FM	Springfield	iHM Licenses, LLC	Hot adult contemporary
WICN	90.5 FM	Worcester	WICN Public Radio, Inc	Jazz
WILD	1090 AM	Boston	Blount Masscom, Inc.	Christian
WIOM-LP	101.7 FM	Springfield	Media Preservation Foundation	Adult contemporary
WIQH	88.3 FM	Concord	Concord-Carlisle Regional School District	High school radio
WIZZ	1520 AM	Greenfield	Saga Communications of New England, LLC	Oldies
WJDA	1300 AM	Quincy	Real Media Group, LLC	Ethnic
WJFD-FM	97.3 FM	New Bedford	WJFD-FM, Inc.	Portuguese
WJFE	88.1 FM	Nantucket	Nantucket Multi-Cultural Media	Spanish rhythmic
WJIB	740 AM	Cambridge	RCRQ, Inc.	Adult standards
WJJW	91.1 FM	North Adams	Massachusetts College	College radio
WJMN	94.5 FM	Boston	iHM Licenses, LLC	Rhythmic contemporary hit radio
WJNF	91.7 FM	Dalton	Horizon Christian Fellowship	Christian
WJOP-LP	96.3 FM	Newburyport	Newburyport Community Media Center	Community radio
WJWT	91.7 FM	Gardner	Horizon Christian Fellowship	Christian
WKFY	98.7 FM	East Harwich	Coxswain Media LLC	Soft adult contemporary
WKGT-LP	104.7 FM	North Adams	Gospel Train Ministry	Christian
WKKL	90.7 FM	West Barnstable	Cape Cod Community College	Classic alternative
WKLB-FM	102.5 FM	Waltham	Beasley Media Group, LLC	Country
WKMY	99.9 FM	Athol	Educational Media Foundation	Contemporary Christian (K-Love)
WKOX	1430 AM	Everett	Delmarva Educational Association	Spanish Christian
WKPE-FM	103.9 FM	South Yarmouth	Sandab Communication Limited Partnership II	Country
WKVB	107.3 FM	Westborough	Educational Media Foundation	Contemporary Christian (K-Love)
WLAS-LP	102.9 FM	Auburndale	Lasell College Radio	Alternative/College Radio
WLCQ-LP	99.7 FM	Feeding Hills	Lighthouse Christian Center	Christian rock
WLHZ-LP	107.9 FM	Springfield	La Hora Ministerio	Spanish religious
WLLH	1400 AM	Lawrence/Lowell	Gois Broadcasting Boston LLC	Spanish
WLPV-LP	107.9 FM	Greenfield	Living Waters Assembly of God	Religious Teaching
WLPZ-LP	95.1 FM	Leominster	City of Leominster	Community radio
WLYN	1360 AM	Lynn	Multicultural Radio Broadcasting Licensee, LLC	Ethnic
WLZX	1600 AM	East Longmeadow	Saga Communications of New England, LLC	Active rock
WLZX-FM	99.3 FM	Northampton	Saga Communications of New England, LLC	Active rock
WMBR	88.1 FM	Cambridge	Technology Broadcasting Corporation	College radio
WMCB-LP	107.9 FM	Greenfield	Greenfield Community Television, Inc.	Community radio
WMEX	1510 AM	Quincy	Marshfield Broadcasting Co., Inc.	Silent
WMFO	91.5 FM	Medford	Tufts University	College radio
WMHC	91.5 FM	South Hadley	Trustees of Mount Holyoke College	College radio
WMJX	106.7 FM	Boston	Audacy License, LLC	Adult contemporary
WMLN-FM	91.5 FM	Milton	Curry College	College radio
WMNB-LP	107.1 FM	North Adams	Northern Berkshire Community Television Corporation	Variety
WMRC	101.3 FM	Milford	First Class Radio Corp.	Classic hits
WMUA	91.1 FM	Amherst	University of Massachusetts	College radio
WMVY	88.7 FM	Edgartown	Friends of Mvyradio, Inc.	Adult album alternative
WMWM	91.7 FM	Salem	Salem State College Board of Trustees	College radio
WNAN	91.1 FM	Nantucket	WGBH Educational Foundation	Public radio
WNAW	1230 AM	North Adams	Townsquare License, LLC	Country
WNBH	1340 AM	New Bedford	Hall Communications, Inc.	Adult hits
WNBP	1450 AM	Newburyport	Bloomberg Radio Newburyport LLC	Business news
WNCK	89.5 FM	Nantucket	Nantucket Public Radio Inc	Country
WNEB	1230 AM	Worcester	Emmanuel Communications, Inc.	Catholic
WNEF	91.7 FM	Newburyport	University of Massachusetts	Adult album alternative
WNGB	91.3 FM	Petersham	Northeast Gospel Broadcasting Inc.	Contemporary Christian
WNKC	104.9 FM	Gloucester	Educational Media Foundation	Contemporary Christian (K-Love)
WNNI	98.9 FM	Adams	New England Public Radio Foundation, Inc.	Classical
WNNU	89.5 FM	Great Barrington	New England Public Radio Foundation, Inc.	Classical
WNNW	800 AM	Lawrence	Costa-Eagle Radio Ventures Limited Partnership	Spanish
WNNZ	640 AM	Westfield	New England Public Radio Foundation Inc.	Public radio
WNNZ-FM	91.7 FM	Deerfield	New England Public Radio Foundation Inc.	Classical
WNPD-LP	105.5 FM	Nantucket	Town of Nantucket Police Department	Emergency Info
WNRC-LP	97.5 FM	Dudley	Nichols College	College radio
WNTN	1550 AM	Cambridge	Delta Communications, LLC	Ethnic
WOCN-FM	104.7 FM	Orleans	Cape Cod Broadcasting License II, LLC	Soft adult contemporary
WOMR	92.1 FM	Provincetown	Lower Cape Communications, Inc.	Community radio
WORC	1310 AM	Worcester	Gois Broadcasting LLC	Spanish
WORC-FM	98.9 FM	Webster	Radio License Holding CBC, LLC	Country
WOZQ	91.9 FM	Northampton	Trustees of the Smith College	College radio
WPKZ	1280 AM	Fitchburg	K-Zone Media Group, LLC	News Talk Information
WPLM	1390 AM	Plymouth	Plymouth Rock Broadcasting Co., Inc.	Soft adult contemporary
WPLM-FM	99.1 FM	Plymouth	Plymouth Rock Broadcasting Co., Inc.	Soft adult contemporary
WPMW	88.5 FM	Middleborough Center	Holy Family Communications	Catholic
WPVQ-FM	95.3 FM	Greenfield	Saga Communications of New England, LLC	Country
WPXC	102.9 FM	Hyannis	Coxswain Media LLC	Mainstream rock
WQEB-LP	99.9 FM	Winchester	Winchester School of Chinese Culture	
WQOM	1060 AM	Natick	Holy Family Communications	Catholic
WQPH	89.3 FM	Shirley	Prayers for Life, Inc.	Catholic
WQRC	99.9 FM	Barnstable	Sandab Communication Limited Partnership II	Hot adult contemporary
WQVD	700 AM	Orange-Athol	Hampden Communications Co	Classic hits
WQVR	940 AM	Webster	Quinebaug Valley Broadcasting, LLC	Classic hits
WRBB	104.9 FM	Boston	Northeastern University	College radio
WRCA	1330 AM	Waltham	Beasley Media Group, LLC	Classic rock
WREA-LP	104.9 FM	Holyoke	Radio Redentor	Spanish religious
WRKO	680 AM	Boston	iHM Licenses, LLC	Talk
WRNX	100.9 FM	Amherst	iHM Licenses, LLC	Country
WROL	950 AM	Boston	Salem Media Group, LLC	Religious
WROR-FM	105.7 FM	Framingham	Beasley Media Group, LLC	Classic hits
WRPS	88.3 FM	Rockland	Rockland Public Schools	High school radio
WRRS	88.5 FM	Bayview	Holy Family Communications	Catholic
WRRS-LP	104.3 FM	Pittsfield	Berkshire Benevolent Association for the Blind, Inc.	Reading for the Blind
WRSI	93.9 FM	Turners Falls	Saga Communications of New England, LLC	Adult album alternative
WRWX	91.1 FM	Winchendon	Educational Media Foundation	Christian worship (Air1)
WRYP	90.1 FM	Wellfleet	Horizon Christian Fellowship	Christian
WSAR	1480 AM	Fall River	Bristol County Broadcasting, Inc.	News/Talk
WSBS	860 AM	Great Barrington	Townsquare License, LLC	Adult contemporary
WSCB	89.9 FM	Springfield	The President & Trustee of Springfield College	College radio
WSDH	91.5 FM	Sandwich	Sandwich, Massachusetts Public Schools	Community radio
WSHL-FM	91.3 FM	Easton	Stonehill College, Inc.	College, alternative
WSKB	89.5 FM	Westfield	Trustees of Westfield State College	College radio
WSMA	90.5 FM	Scituate	CSN International	Religious (CSN International)
WSNE-FM	93.3 FM	Taunton	iHM Licenses, LLC	Hot adult contemporary
WSPR	1490 AM	West Springfield	Red Wolf Broadcasting Corporation	Spanish Tropical
WSRS	96.1 FM	Worcester	iHM Licenses, LLC	Adult contemporary
WTAG	580 AM	Worcester	iHM Licenses, LLC	News/Talk
WTBR-FM	89.7 FM	Pittsfield	Pittsfield Public School Committee	Classic rock
WTCC	90.7 FM	Springfield	Springfield Technical Community College	College radio
WTKL	91.1 FM	North Dartmouth	Educational Media Foundation	Contemporary Christian (K-Love)
WTYN	91.7 FM	Lunenburg	Horizon Christian Fellowship	Christian
WUBG	1570 AM	Methuen	Costa-Eagle Radio Ventures Limited Partnership	Contemporary Christian (K-Love)
WUMB-FM	91.9 FM	Boston	University of Massachusetts	Adult album alternative
WUMG	91.7 FM	Stow	University of Massachusetts	Adult album alternative
WUML	91.5 FM	Lowell	University of Massachusetts, Lowell	College radio
WUMT	91.7 FM	Marshfield	University of Massachusetts	Folk
WUMZ	91.5 FM	Gloucester	University of Massachusetts	Adult album alternative
WUNR	1600 AM	Brookline	Champion Broadcasting Systems, Inc.	Ethnic
WUPE-FM	100.1 FM	North Adams	Townsquare License, LLC	Classic hits
WUTY-LP	97.9 FM	Worcester	Pride Productions, Inc.	
WVAO-LP	105.9 FM	Athol	Athol Orange Community Television, Inc.	Community radio
WVBF	1530 AM	Middleborough Center	MRP Communications and Consulting, LLC	Talk, Talking Information Center
WVDP-LP	102.9 FM	Templeton	Templeton Biblical Educational Society, Incorporated	Religious Teaching
WVEI	1440 AM	Worcester	Audacy License, LLC	Sports (ISN)
WVNE	760 AM	Leicester	Blount Masscom, Inc.	Christian
WVVY-LP	96.7 FM	Tisbury	Martha's Vineyard Community Radio Inc.	Community radio
WWBX	104.1 FM	Boston	Audacy License, LLC	Hot adult contemporary
WWDJ	1150 AM	Boston	Relevant Radio, Inc.	Catholic
WWEI	105.5 FM	Easthampton	Audacy License, LLC	Sports (ISN)
WWFX	100.1 FM	Southbridge	Radio License Holding CBC, LLC	Classic rock
WWRN	88.5 FM	Rockport	Horizon Christian Fellowship	Christian
WXBJ-LP	94.1 FM	Salisbury	Good Neighbor Station Inc.	Oldies
WXKS	1200 AM	Newton	iHM Licenses, LLC	Conservative talk
WXKS-FM	107.9 FM	Medford	iHM Licenses, LLC	Top 40 (CHR)
WXLO	104.5 FM	Fitchburg	Radio License Holding CBC, LLC	Hot adult contemporary
WXOJ-LP	103.3 FM	Northampton	Valley Free Radio, Inc.	Community radio
WXPL	91.3 FM	Fitchburg	Fitchburg State University	College radio/Alternative
WXRB	95.1 FM	Dudley	WXRB-FM Educational Broadcasting, Inc.	Oldies ('50s, '60s and '70s)
WXRV	92.5 FM	Andover	Beanpot License Corp.	Adult album alternative
WXTK	95.1 FM	West Yarmouth	iHM Licenses, LLC	News/Talk
WYQQ	90.1 FM	Charlton	Epic Light Network, Inc.	Contemporary Christian
WYZX	88.3 FM	East Falmouth	Horizon Christian Fellowship	Christian
WZAI	94.3 FM	Brewster	WGBH Educational Foundation	Public radio
WZBC	90.3 FM	Newton	Trustees of Boston College	College radio
WZCS-LP	102.5 FM	Springfield	CatolicaSpringfield.com	Spanish Catholic
WZLX	100.7 FM	Boston	iHM Licenses, LLC	Classic rock
WZLY	91.5 FM	Wellesley	Wellesley College	College radio
WZMR-LP	94.9 FM	East Boston	Zumix, Inc.	Variety
WZMW-LP	94.9 FM	East Boston	Winthrop Art Association	Variety
WZRM	97.7 FM	Brockton	iHM Licenses, LLC	Spanish CHR

== Defunct ==
- WCCT-FM
- WDIS
- WFNX
- WGAJ
- WGI
- WGTR
- WHMQ
- WJDF
- WJXP
- WMAF
- WNEK-FM
- WNMH
- WNYW
- WPAA
- WPEP
- WPNI
- WREB
- WRSB
- WSRO
- WUPE
- WWQZ
- WWTA
- WXLJ-LP
- WYAJ
- WYOB-LP
- WZBR

== See also ==
- List of United States radio networks
- List of television stations in Massachusetts
