= WTBR-FM =

- Pittsfield, Massachusetts; United States
- Frequency: 89.7 MHz
- Branding: Pittsfield Community Radio

Programming
- Format: Classic rock
- Affiliations: Pittsfield Suns

Ownership
- Owner: Pittsfield Public School Committee
- Operator: Pittsfield Community Cable Broadcasting, Inc.

History
- First air date: June 27, 1978
- Call sign meaning: "Taconic Brave Radio"

Technical information
- Licensing authority: FCC
- Facility ID: 52749
- Class: A
- ERP: 350 watts
- HAAT: −82 meters (−269 ft)

Links
- Public license information: Public file; LMS
- Webcast: Listen live
- Website: www.wtbrfm.com

WTBR-FM (89.7 MHz, "Pittsfield Community Radio") is a non-commercial educational station broadcasting a community radio and classic rock music format. Licensed to Pittsfield, Massachusetts, United States, the station serves the Pittsfield area from a studio located at 4 Federico Drive. The station is currently owned by and licensed to the Pittsfield Public School Committee, and managed and programmed by Pittsfield Community Cable Broadcasting, Inc. through a time-brokerage agreement.

== History ==
From 1974 until June 25, 2018, the station's studio, transmitter and antenna were located at Taconic High School on Valentine Road in PIttsfield. The station was first licensed as WTBR-FM on June 27, 1978. In the 1970s under the leadership of station director, Bob Cooper, the station flourished with a wide range of student programming and an organization that continued to build the impressive archive of vinyl records. The station's collection contains an estimated 10,000 records from the late 1960s into the early 1990s. Over the years, the station continued to serve as a significant outlet for the school and community.

However, in the several years prior to 2006, the station had become devoid of programming as student turnover left WTBR with dead-air for a vast majority of the time.

=== Return to air ===
In 2006, a group of radio veterans, led by longtime WUPE-FM news director Larry Kratka, lit a new spark for the station. Kratka brought in several radio veterans, such as Tom Harrison, Joe Mindlin and Brad Lorenz, all of whom were on-air personalities and producers for WUPE-FM; John Krol, who is the former morning news anchor and opinion show host for WNAW and WMNB in North Adams and former Berkshire Bureau Chief for WAMC-Northeast Public Radio. Krol's "Good Morning Pittsfield" served as the anchor morning program with news from the Berkshire Eagle and featured interviews with local public officials, business leaders, journalists and other community leaders. The station also featured unique specialty music programs including the only underground music program in the Berkshires; Mike's Amazing Oldies featuring long lost resurrected music from the vault of host Mike Pezzo; the hard rocking metallic edge of Wounded Radio hosted by Tom Harrison; classic 1980s rock and dance of Classic TBR with Brad Lorenz and Joe Mindlin; and the longest-running Polish polka show in the area, Polka Express. Larry Kratka was appointed Student Advisor and was also active in upgrading the technology at the station, including new equipment, upgrading to stereo, and allowing WTBR to transmit its full power allowed by its license.

In June 2010, WTBR became the first station in Western Massachusetts to take part in the American Cancer Society's 'Relay for Life' in Berkshire County Central/South AND move to a different site and broadcast the event in stereo for 26 hours. The next year in 2011, they followed suit and became the official radio station for the Relay for Life in Berkshire County Central/South. In 2011 and 2012, WTBR broadcast 26 hours for Special Olympics COP ON TOP fundraiser and received and award for its hard work.

In 2012, WTBR's Sunday lineup added a popular talk show, Ask The Professor, which used to air on Sunday mornings on WUPE-FM.

In February 2014, Kratka retired from WBEC and WUPE, then owned by Gamma Broadcasting, and also stepped down as student advisor at WTBR.

=== Move from Taconic High School to PCTV ===
At the regular meeting of the Pittsfield Public School Committee on October 8, 2014, Superintendent Jason "Jake" McCandless outlined steps that he would be undertaking in the next few months to evaluate the school district's continued operation of WTBR. McCandless cited student safety and Federal Communications Commission (FCC) compliance among his concerns. At the meeting, a petition with over 1,000 signatures was presented to the committee to save the station. In addition, a crowd of about 15 student alumni and other community members opposed to the potential loss of WTBR addressed the committee during its open microphone agenda item.

In October 2015, The Pittsfield School Building Needs Commission voted to seek contractors for site work, pouring the foundation, steel and precast concrete for the replacement of the old Taconic High School building. This new building would not contain plans to house the WTBR studio or transmission facilities. By June 2017, the Pittsfield Public School Committee was exploring potential partnerships with higher education, and other radio and media outlets for a new home for the station. United Cerebral Palsy of Berkshire County was considered as a potential partner.

On April 18, 2018, the Pittsfield Public School Committee voted to enter into a time-brokerage agreement with Pittsfield Community Cable Broadcasting, Inc., operating as Pittsfield Community Television, to manage and program the station. The TBA took effect on July 1, 2018.

On June 25, 2018, after a two-hour broadcast finale of Good Morning PIttsfield, the station was taken silent in anticipation of the demolition of Taconic High School, which housed the studio and transmission facilities. The studio and transmission equipment, along with the entire vinyl music collection, were moved to the Pittsfield Community Television facility on Federico Drive before the old Taconic High School building was demolished. A new studio was constructed as preparations were underway to relocate the transmitter and antenna.

On December 15, 2018, regular broadcasts resumed at a lower power under a special temporary authority granted by the Federal Communications Commission. On January 3, 2019, the first live studio broadcast from the new studio at Federico Drive was aired. The broadcast was hosted by William Sturgeon, and featured as guests Superintendent Jason McCandless, School Committee Chair Katherine Yon, Pittsfield Community Television Executive Director Shawn Serre, along with several station alumni and PCTV staff. On July 2, 2019, WTBR-FM applied to permanently move their transmitter to a building in downtown Pittsfield. The site change became permanent and licensed on November 1, 2019.

On April 26, 2022, it was announced that WTBR-FM would be the exclusive home of Pittsfield Suns carrying all home and road games during the 2022 season. This marked the first time a radio station covered one team's entire season in the history of the Futures Collegiate Baseball League.

== Events ==
Over the years, WTBR has provided entertainment and broadcast live from events throughout Berkshire County. In 2009, WTBR was the only local radio station to actually broadcast the entire show from their remote location.

- American Cancer Society's Relay For Life
- Hinsdale Block Party
- Massachusetts Special Olympics' Cop On Top
- Pittsfield Third Thursday
- Pittsfield Ethnic Fair
- Pittsfield Colonials Baseball (both home and away games)
- Shriner's Bowl-A-Thon
- United Cerebral Palsy Telethon

== Station alumni ==
During its history, the station helped jump-start the budding careers of many future radio professionals in the Berkshires and beyond. Of note, NASA astronaut, Stephanie D. Wilson, was a member of the radio club and she hosted her own program on WTBR. A 1984 graduate of Taconic High School, Wilson would go on to become the second African-American woman in space, taking part in three successful Space Shuttle missions in 2006, 2007 and 2010.
