= WUPE =

WUPE may refer to:

- WUPE (AM), a radio station (1110 AM) licensed to Pittsfield, Massachusetts, United States
- WUPE-FM, a radio station (100.1 FM) licensed to North Adams, United States
- WBEC-FM, a radio station (95.9 FM) licensed to Pittsfield, Massachusetts, United States, which used the call signs WUPE-FM and WUPE from 1977 until 2006
