= WBRK =

WBRK may refer to:

- WBRK (AM), a radio station (1340 AM) licensed to Pittsfield, Massachusetts, United States
- WBRK-FM, a radio station (101.7 FM) licensed to Pittsfield, Massachusetts, United States
