= WBEC =

WBEC may refer to radio and television call signs in the United States:

- WBEC (AM), a radio station (1420 AM) licensed to Pittsfield, Massachusetts
- WBEC-FM, a radio station (95.9 FM) licensed to Pittsfield, Massachusetts
- WBEC-TV, a television station (channel 25, virtual 63) licensed to Boca Raton, Florida

It may also mean:

- West Baffin Eskimo Cooperative, an Inuit artists' cooperative
