= WVEI =

WVEI may refer to:

- WVEI (AM), a radio station (1440 AM) licensed to Worcester, Massachusetts, United States
- WPVD-FM, a radio station (103.7 FM) licensed to Westerly, Rhode Island, United States, which used the call sign WVEI-FM from 2011 to 2026
- WWEI, a radio station (105.5 FM) licensed to Easthampton, Massachusetts, United States, which used the call sign WVEI-FM from 2006 to 2011
