= Masoud Nosrati =

Iranian politician

- مسعود نصرتی قزوینی‌نژاد

Mayor of Rasht
- In office 4 September 2017 – 23 July 2018
- Preceded by: Mohammad Ali Sabetghadam
- Succeeded by: Ali Baharmast

Personal details
- Born: 26 June 1968 (age 58) Qazvin, Iran

Masoud Nosrati (Persian: مسعود نصرتی قزوینی‌نژاد) is an Iranian politician and the Deputy Resources and Support of Organization of municipalities and government agencies Development.

He was elected as Sixty-Fifth mayor of Rasht by the Islamic City Council of Rasht on September 4, 2017. He resigned from this position on July 24, 2018

- President of the World Assembly of Silk Road Cities WASRC
- President of the World Assembly of Islamic Cities WAIC
- Education: Ph.D. urbanization - the tendency of Geography and Urban Planning
- Master of Public Administration (Graduate Institute of Research Management and Planning, 2003)
- Civil engineer Islamic Azad University of Maragheh
- Mayor of Qazvin
- Mayor of Rasht
