= Lavanchy =

Lavanchy is a surname. Notable people with the surname include:

- Gene Lavanchy (born 1964), American radio and television personality
- Marisa Lavanchy (born 1990), Swiss sprinter
- Numa Lavanchy (born 1993), Swiss footballer
- Pascal Lavanchy (born 1968), French ice dancer
