= WUPE (AM) =

Radio station in Pittsfield, Massachusetts, 1971–2025

- Pittsfield, Massachusetts; United States
- Broadcast area: Berkshire Mountains
- Frequency: 1110 kHz

Ownership
- Owner: Townsquare Media; (Townsquare License, LLC)
- Sister stations: WBEC; WBEC-FM; WNAW; WSBS; WUPE-FM

History
- First air date: September 9, 1971
- Last air date: March 25, 2025
- Former call signs: WGRG (1971–1977); WUPE (1977–1979); WUHN (1979–2006)
- Call sign meaning: "Whoopie"

Technical information
- Facility ID: 71436
- Class: D
- Power: 5,000 watts (days only)
- Transmitter coordinates: 42°26′22.3″N 73°17′28.38″W
- Translator: 103.3 W277CJ (Pittsfield)

WUPE (1110 AM) was a commercial radio station licensed to Pittsfield, Massachusetts, United States, and served the Berkshire Mountains area during the daytime hours only. Last owned by Townsquare Media, it simulcast the classic hits format of WUPE-FM. WUPE operated from 1971 to 2025.

WUPE was also heard in Pittsfield on FM translator W277CJ at 103.3 MHz; since WUPE AM's closure, W277CJ has received WUPE-FM's programming from the second HD Radio channel of WBEC-FM.

== History ==
The station first signed on the air on September 9, 1971, as progressive rock WGRG. WGRG became Top 40 WUPE in 1977. WUPE became WUHN, playing adult standards in the early 1980s. The format was flipped to oldies in 1990, and then to country music in 1996. The WUPE call letters were restored along with the oldies format in 2006.

In August 2013, Gamma Broadcasting reached a deal to sell its Berkshire County radio stations, including WUPE, to Reed Miami Holdings; the sale was canceled on December 30, 2013. In August 2015, WUPE added an FM translator in the Pittsfield area. In October 2016, Gamma agreed to sell its stations to Galaxy Communications; that sale also fell through, and in 2017 the stations were acquired by Townsquare Media.

On March 25, 2025, Townsquare submitted an application to the Federal Communications Commission (FCC) to cancel the license of WUPE, as part of an ongoing shutdown of underperforming stations. Translator station W277CJ now receives its programming from the second HD Radio channel of WBEC-FM. The license was cancelled on March 27, 2025.
