= WAMF =

WAMF may refer to:

- WAMF-LP, a low-power radio station (90.3 FM) licensed to serve New Orleans, Louisiana, United States
- WOSW, a radio station (1300 AM) licensed to serve Fulton, New York, United States, which held the call sign WAMF from 2002 to 2012
- WANM, a radio station (90.5 FM) licensed to serve Tallahassee, Florida, United States, which held the call sign WAMF until 1999
- WAMH, a radio station (89.3 FM) licensed to serve the Pioneer Valley in Massachusetts, which held the call sign WAMF until 1971
