= Gene Lavanchy =

American television personality

Gene P. Lavanchy
- Born: September 17, 1964 (age 61); Boston, Massachusetts
- Citizenship: United States
- Education: Bachelor of Science degree in Mass Communication / Broadcast Journalism
- Alma mater: Emerson College, Boston, 1986
- Occupation: Broadcast Journalist
- Employer: WFXT-TV Boston
- Spouse: Anne-Marie
- Awards: AP award for best sports feature, UPI award for overall sports coverage, "Best Sports Anchor" by Boston magazine,

Gene P. Lavanchy (born September 17, 1964) is an American radio and television personality and journalist, and a co-host of WFXT's Boston 25 Morning News in Boston.

== Education and career ==
Lavanchy was born in Boston, Massachusetts, grew up in Walpole, Massachusetts, and received his Bachelor of Science degree in Mass Communication/Broadcast Journalism from Emerson College in 1986.

Gene began his broadcast career in 1983 at WJCC-AM radio (now WDIS AM 1170) in Norfolk, Massachusetts as a sports writer and producer.

He got his start in TV news in 1986, covering sports at WBBH-TV in Fort Myers, Florida, in 1988 he was a sports anchor at WLNE-TV in Providence, Rhode Island, and also host of WSBK-TV's Boston Bruins telecasts.

Coming onto the news scene in 1993 with WHDH in Boston, he became their sports director and sports anchor in 1994. As time progressed, he also hosted WHDH's "Sports Xtra" Sunday late night sports program, where he would interview and discuss current topics with many local New England sports stars. After leaving WHDH, Gene arrived to WFXT in August 2003. Lavanchy and co-host Kim Carrigan, who had also left WHDH, lead one of Boston's most popular morning news shows.

On December 17, 2007, Lavanchy featured his own English Wikipedia article page on WFXT's Morning News in a segment about finding yourself on the Internet.

== Awards ==
Lavanchy won the UPI award for overall sports coverage in 1988, was the recipient of the 1991 AP award for best sports feature, and, in 1994, Lavanchy was named "Best Sports Anchor" by Boston magazine's annual "Best of Boston" Awards.

== Personal life ==
He and his wife Anne Marie and their children live in Walpole, Massachusetts.
