= WFCR =

Public radio station in Amherst, Massachusetts, United States

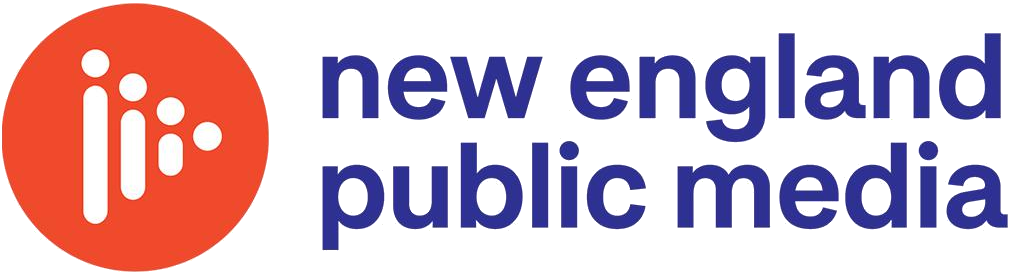
- Amherst, Massachusetts; United States
- Broadcast area: Pioneer Valley including Springfield, Massachusetts
- Frequency: 88.5 MHz (HD Radio)
- Branding: 88.5 NEPM

Programming
- Format: Public radio
- Subchannels: HD2: Classical music

Ownership
- Owner: University of Massachusetts Amherst; (University of Massachusetts)
- Operator: New England Public Media (under program service agreement)
- Sister stations: TV: WGBY-TV

History
- First air date: May 6, 1961
- Call sign meaning: "Five College Radio"

Technical information
- Licensing authority: FCC
- Facility ID: 69304
- Class: B
- ERP: 13,000 watts
- HAAT: 295 meters (968 ft)
- Transmitter coordinates: 42.364°N 72.423°W
- Translator: See § Translators

Links
- Public license information: Public file; LMS
- Webcast: Listen live
- Website: www.nepm.org

WFCR (88.5 FM) is a non-commercial radio station licensed to Amherst, Massachusetts. It serves as the National Public Radio (NPR) member station for Western Massachusetts, including Springfield. The station operates at 13,000 watts ERP from a transmitter on Mount Lincoln in Pelham, Massachusetts, 968 feet (295 meters) above average terrain. The University of Massachusetts Amherst holds the license. The station airs NPR news programs during the morning and afternoon drive times and in the early evening. Middays and overnights are devoted to classical music and jazz is heard during the later evening hours.

WFCR's broadcasting range extends to Western and Central Massachusetts, Northern Connecticut (including Hartford) as well as parts of Southern Vermont and Southern New Hampshire. WFCR's studios for most of its history were located at Hampshire House on the UMass campus. However, in 2013, the station moved most of its operations to the Fuller Building in downtown Springfield.

The station signed on May 6, 1961, as a simulcast of WGBH-FM in Boston. By 1962, it had severed the electronic umbilical cord with WGBH-FM, and by 1964 it had expanded its local programming to 17 hours per day. The call letters originally represented "Four College Radio", becoming "Five College Radio" in 1966. It is a charter member of NPR, and was one of the stations that carried the initial broadcast of NPR's All Things Considered.

While UMass has held the license since 1967, when it was acquired from the WGBH Educational Foundation, WFCR has always received funding from the Five Colleges (UMass Amherst, Smith College, Mount Holyoke College, Amherst College and Hampshire College) as well as from fund drives conducted periodically over the air. Since 2011, WFCR and sister station 640 AM WNNZ have called themselves New England Public Radio.

WFCR claims the distinction of being the first radio station in Western Massachusetts to transmit a signal using iBiquity's HD Radio system. It airs two digital streams. The first is a simulcast of the analog signal, the second is a 24-hour classical music station.

On April 11, 2019, WFCR announced that it would consolidate operations with WGBH-owned PBS station WGBY-TV (channel 57) under the New England Public Media banner, effective in July. UMass will retain the WFCR license, and the New England Public Radio Foundation will retain the licenses to WNNZ and its satellites; NEPM will operate the stations under program service operating agreements.

== Translators ==
In addition to the main FM station, WFCR is relayed by five translators (FM), to increase its broadcast area.

Broadcast translators for WFCR
Call sign	Frequency	City of license	FID	ERP (W)	HAAT	Class	Transmitter coordinates	FCC info
W242AT	96.3 FM	Williamstown, Massachusetts	142211	250	−220.1 m (−722 ft)	D	42°42′36.2″N 73°12′10.3″W	LMS
W252BG	98.3 FM	Lee, Massachusetts	142208	13	9.3 m (31 ft)	D	42°17′39.3″N 73°13′1.3″W	LMS
W254AU	98.7 FM	Great Barrington, Massachusetts	142841	250	−53.7 m (−176 ft)	D	42°12′50.3″N 73°20′41.3″W	LMS
W266AW	101.1 FM	North Adams, Massachusetts	142212	10	135 m (443 ft)	D	42°41′54.2″N 73°3′52.3″W	LMS
W291CH	106.1 FM	Pittsfield, Massachusetts	141373	10	204.4 m (671 ft)	D	42°24′44.3″N 73°17′5.4″W	LMS

== NEPR News Network ==
WFCR provides a full-time NPR news and information service on the NEPR News Network, which consists of four radio stations in Western Massachusetts owned by its nonprofit fundraising arm, the New England Public Radio Foundation, along with two additional stations owned by area colleges. The network carries programming from NPR, Public Radio Exchange, the BBC and CBC Radio. Programs include Morning Edition, All Things Considered, Fresh Air, The Takeaway, Here and Now, Q and BBC World Service.

Call sign	Frequency	City of license	First air date	Facility ID	Power (W)	ERP (W)	Height (m (ft))	Class	Transmitter coordinates	Former call signs	Licensee
WNNZ	640 AM	Westfield, Massachusetts	December 1957 (on 1570 AM); July 8, 1987 (on 640 AM)	9736	50,000 day 1,000 night			B	42°10′46.33″N 72°45′3.34″W	WDEW (1957–1978); WLDM (1978–1987)	New England Public Radio Foundation, Inc.
WNNZ-FM	91.7 FM	Deerfield, Massachusetts	May 1982	68194		100	95 m (312 ft)	A	42°32′3.3″N 72°35′30.3″W	WGAJ (1982–2010)	New England Public Radio Foundation, Inc.
WNNI	98.9 FM	Adams, Massachusetts	July 2014	189578		630	116.6 m (383 ft)	A	42°41′54.2″N 73°3′52.3″W		New England Public Radio Foundation, Inc.
WNNU	89.5 FM	Great Barrington, Massachusetts	April 19, 2013	174491		270	196.2 m (644 ft)	A	42°14′34.3″N 73°29′11.4″W		New England Public Radio Foundation, Inc.
WAMH	89.3 FM	Amherst, Massachusetts	1955	68222		130	233 m (764 ft)	A	42°21′49.3″N 72°25′22.3″W	WAMF (1955–1971)	Amherst College
WAIC	91.9 FM	Springfield, Massachusetts	February 1967	1749		200	22.1 m (73 ft)	A	42°6′45.3″N 72°33′22.3″W		American International College

=== WNNZ ===
The flagship station of the NEPR News Network is WNNZ, 640 kHz AM, licensed to Westfield, Massachusetts, which was once owned by Clear Channel Communications (now iHeartMedia). WNNZ's power output is 50,000 watts in the daytime, the maximum permitted for AM stations by the Federal Communications Commission. But because 640 kHz is a clear channel frequency for CBN in St. John's, Newfoundland and Labrador, WNNZ must reduce power to 1,000 watts at night. The antenna is a three-tower array, using differing directional patterns day and night. During the day, it provides at least secondary coverage to all of western Massachusetts, as well as New York's Capital District and the Hartford area. At night, the signal is cut back to concentrate the signal northward around the Springfield and Hartford areas.

Until 2010, WFCR provided WNNZ's programming, while Clear Channel sold underwriting advertisements. However, in July 2010, WFCR purchased WNNZ from Clear Channel for $525,000. The sale does not include the transmission towers, but rather has a lease clause in the sale agreement in which Clear Channel will own them and lease them to WFCR. WFCR purchased the license from Clear Channel under the name of "WFCR Foundation Inc." The FCC approved the sale August 25, 2010. Prior to 2007, the programming heard on WNNZ was heard on WPNI, 1430 kHz, in Amherst, which was owned by Pamal Broadcasting.

=== WNNZ-FM (formerly WGAJ) ===
WFCR, again, under the licensee name of "WFCR Foundation Inc.", acquired the license of WGAJ 91.7 MHz in Deerfield, Massachusetts from Deerfield Academy. The license transfer was granted on August 19, 2010. WFCR paid Deerfield Academy $10,000 for the signal. The call letters of the station were changed to WNNZ-FM as of September 1, 2010.

=== WNNI ===
WFCR won the allocation of 98.9 in Adams, Massachusetts, in FCC Auction #91 (under the applicant name, WFCR Foundation Inc.). WFCR won it for $189,750. WFCR filed the application for a new station with the FCC, to transmit the new signal from the top of West Summit, in North Adams, Massachusetts, where the current WUPE-FM transmitter site is located. WFCR already has a translator, W266AW, located there.

=== WNNU ===
WNNU was launched in 2013; it broadcasts on 89.5 and serves the southern portion of Berkshire County and part of Columbia County in neighboring New York state.

=== Other stations ===
In addition to WNNZ-AM-FM, WNNI, and WNNU, the NEPR News Network is heard on 89.3 WAMH Amherst, serving Hampshire County, and 91.9 WAIC Springfield, serving Hampden County. WAIC joined the network on July 1, 2016, after switching its programming source from Connecticut Public Radio. It is owned by American International College in Springfield, but programmed by WFCR. WAMH simulcasts WNNZ from 2 a.m. to 4 p.m. with student free form programming the other hours of the day (when Amherst College is in session).

== See also ==
- Campus radio
- List of college radio stations in the United States
- WAIC
- WAMH
