= Cynthia Propper Seton =

American novelist (1926–1982)

- Born: Cynthia Propper; October 11, 1926; New York City
- Died: October 23, 1982 (aged 56); Northampton, Massachusetts
- Education: B.A., Smith College, 1948
- Occupation: Writer
- Spouse: Paul H. Seton
- Children: 5
- Writing career
- Language: English
- Years active: 1956–1982
- Genres: Novels, essays, newspaper columns
- Subjects: Marriage, motherhood, feminism

Cynthia Propper Seton (October 11, 1926 – October 23, 1982) was an American writer and feminist. Following a 12-year career as a columnist for The Berkshire Eagle in Pittsfield, Massachusetts, she began writing essays and fiction, producing five novels and three essay collections. Her third novel, A Fine Romance, was a finalist for the 1977 National Book Award for Fiction.

== Early life and education ==
Cynthia Propper was born on October 11, 1926, in New York City to Karl Propper and Charlotte Jansen. She graduated from the Fieldston School in New York City and earned her bachelor's degree in 1948 from Smith College in Northampton, Massachusetts.

== Career ==
After marriage, she and her physician husband settled in Stockbridge, Massachusetts. While her husband supported the family, she embraced the opportunity to write, later saying that she "hopes for the day when the feminist movement will be able to acknowledge that 'yes, you can run the home and change the diapers and wash the dishes—as a tradeoff for the privacy to read and write'". In 1956 she began writing a regular column for The Berkshire Eagle while living in Pittsfield, Massachusetts, continuing this endeavor for the next 12 years. Titled Skirting the Issue, the column addressed "modern motherhood". The Washington Post picked up the column from 1959 to 1960. In 1962 Seton published a collection of her columns under the title I Think Rome Is Burning. In 1968 and 1970, she published two volumes of essays dealing with family and marital relationships during the Vietnam War era.

She published her first novel, The Sea Change of Angela Lewes, in 1971. She went on to produce four more novels, the last of which was published six months before her death. Her third novel, A Fine Romance, was a finalist for the 1977 National Book Award for Fiction. She also penned articles for The Atlantic Monthly, Redbook, and McCall's magazines, and submitted book reviews to various publications.

== Literary style ==
Many of Seton's novels focus on "affluent, middle-aged women" who are dissatisfied with their lives as wives and mothers. Seton did not use feminist rhetoric, but instead adopted "a graceful and ironic style laced with compassion for women struggling to find expression and for the men in their lives". She explained in an interview:

I want to write about husbands who may be obtuse, but who are not brutes, and remind their wives that there is a great deal to hang in there for. And I want to take the middle-aged woman and evoke her refusal to be demeaned, to honor it with a serious acknowledgement.

She was often compared to Jane Austen, whose "comedies of manners" overlaid more serious themes. She was also noted for her "precise, elegant prose", which Seton herself credited to the influence of works by George Eliot and Marcel Proust; she read the latter in the original French.

== Other activities ==
Seton lectured on literary and feminist topics. She was a presenter at the Indiana University Writers Conference in 1982. She noted that "I've always felt an affectionate respect for what a woman can do. If she does it well, it's not demeaning".

== Personal life ==
She married Paul Harold Seton (1924–2012), a physician and psychiatrist, with whom she had four daughters and one son. Her youngest child, Nora, wrote about her mother's influence and her cooking style in The Kitchen Congregation (2000).

Seton was diagnosed with Hodgkin's lymphoma and leukemia in the early 1970s. She died of acute leukemia on October 23, 1982, at her home in Northampton, Massachusetts. The Cynthia Propper Seton Papers are housed in the Sophia Smith Collection at Smith College in Northampton.

== Works ==
- A Private Life. W. W. Norton & Company. 1982. ISBN 9780393015157.
- A Glorious Third. W. W. Norton & Company. 1980. ISBN 0393009874.
- A Fine Romance. J. Curley. 1976. ISBN 089340229X.
- The Half-Sisters. New American Library. 1974.
- The Sea Change of Angela Lewes. W. W. Norton & Company. 1971. ISBN 0393086410.
- The Mother of the Graduate. W. W. Norton & Company. 1970. ISBN 0393344886.
- A Special and Curious Blessing. W. W. Norton & Company. 1968.
- I Think Rome Is Burning. Doubleday. 1962.
