= Reel Top 40 Radio Repository =

The Reel Top 40 Radio Repository, sometimes called REELRADIO, is a virtual museum of radio broadcasts, primarily airchecks from the "Top 40" era of radio in North America. The archives are available by streaming. Established in 1996 as the first online airchecks archive, it was transferred to a dedicated not-for-profit organization, REELRADIO, Inc., in 2000. The site was organized as a series of "collections"; most collections represent the archives of a single contributor. As of April 2018, the repository featured more than 3,568 exhibits.

Two collections are tribute sites to famed Los Angeles disc jockeys Robert W. Morgan and The Real Don Steele, and the organization also hosts other sites about the Top 40 eras at WPGC in Washington and WIXY 1260 in Cleveland.

As of 2008, the board of directors includes founder Richard "Uncle Ricky" Irwin, news reporter Michael Burgess (known as Mike Scott) of KGPE (TV), and Bob Shannon (former vice president of TM Century).

== History ==
The repository site was started as Uncle Ricky's Reel Top 40 Radio Repository on February 12, 1996 by Richard "Uncle Ricky" Irwin, who had been in the radio business for 30 years before becoming a webmaster for Sacramento Network Access. The repository was started using SNA's servers, including a RealAudio streaming media server.

Articles about the site were published in Radio World magazine on March 20, 1996 and Radio & Records on September 13, 1996. Uncle Ricky's Reel Top 40 Radio Repository was one of five Radio category nominees for the 1998 Webby Awards, and an article titled "Radio Patter From The Past: Vintage D.J's Rock On" was published in The New York Times on May 9, 2002.

After SNA was sold to PSINet, the not-for-profit corporation REELRADIO, Inc. was formed on March 23, 2000, with assistance from the Media Preservation Foundation, to collect donations for funding the site; once under the new organization, the site was moved to new hosting facilities in July.

For the first 10 years, the site was supported by voluntary donations. Despite the website having only a few dozen financial supporters, analysis of user behavior revealed thousands of listeners. The organization's board of directors voted for a minimum contribution of $12/year (later $20/year) for access to most of the site's archives.

In its latter years, Reelradio.com also began including "unscoped" entries in the archives, including full versions of the music played on the air checks. With increased enforcement of royalty fees for streaming music, this also increased costs for the web site, and was a factor in requiring an annual membership fee.

Each week, the web site would list the "Reelradio Fab 40", a list of the top exhibits that were played by listeners to the web site for the prior week. Like the surveys printed by top 40 radio stations in their heyday, the Reelradio Fab 40 list showed an entry's current position on the list, what its position was for each of the previous three weeks, and how many weeks it had been in the Fab 40 list.

By early 2018, Uncle Ricky was in failing health. On May 1 of that year, the site was taken down. Shortly after, on June 7, Uncle Ricky died.

This site was offline for almost 3 months until the site returned to normal operations in August 2018 with a new Board of Directors.

In June 2025, the exhibits were moved to a new home at the North Carolina Broadcast History Museum.

== Uncle Ricky ==
Richard Warren "Uncle Ricky" Irwin (January 8, 1951 – June 7, 2018) grew up in Concord, North Carolina and worked at radio stations from age 14. By the time he started the Reelradio Repository, he had worked for about 10 radio stations and written Commodore 128 software to schedule music for radio stations. After his work at SNA, Irwin remained a web designer, then became a software engineer. Irwin died on June 7, 2018.

== See also ==
- Media Preservation Foundation — another similar-minded organization associated with the Repository
