= Stephen Rosenfeld =

- Born: Stephen Samuel Rosenfeld; July 26, 1932; Pittsfield, Massachusetts
- Died: May 2, 2010 (aged 77)
- Education: BA modern history (1953), MA Russian history (1959)
- Alma mater: Harvard University, Columbia University
- Occupation: Journalist
- Years active: 1959–2000
- Employer: The Washington Post
- Spouse(s): Barbara Rosenfeld, née Bromson
- Children: Emmet, David, Becky, and Jim

Stephen Samuel Rosenfeld (July 26, 1932 – May 2, 2010) was an American journalist who worked as an editor and columnist for The Washington Post for 40 years. He joined the newspaper in 1959 as a reporter, was promoted to the editorial board in 1962, became deputy editor of the editorial pages in 1982, and page editor in 1999.

During his time with the newspaper, he wrote over 10,000 op-ed pieces and editorials.(Obit, Stephen S. Rosenfeld, washingtonpost.com) The Post wrote on his death that the ones he was proudest of were a series of editorials calling for the release from internal exile in the Soviet Union of Russian physicist Andrei Sakharov. According to the Post, Sakharov, after his release in 1986, visited Washington and asked to speak to the person who had written the editorials.

Rosenfeld was the author with his wife, Barbara, of Return From Red Square (1967) about his time as the Post's Moscow chief in Moscow in 1964, and The Time of Their Dying (1977) about his parents' death.

== Background ==
Rosenfeld was born in Pittsfield, Massachusetts. The Post wrote that his father owned a local clothing store, played the violin, and wrote pieces about music criticism for the local newspaper, the Berkshire Eagle, while his mother was a secretary and immigrant from Latvia. He obtained his BA in history from Harvard University in 1953, and served in the Marine Corps for two years, before taking up his first job in journalism as a reporter for the Eagle. He went on to complete an MA in Russian history at Columbia University in 1959.

As well as writing editorials, Rosenfeld was one of the Post's foreign affairs correspondents. He opened the newspaper's Moscow bureau in 1964, but was expelled from the Soviet Union a year later because of the Post's serialization, without Rosenfeld's involvement, of The Penkovsky Papers (1965). These were supposedly the memoirs of Oleg Penkovsky, a Soviet intelligence officer convicted of spying for Britain and the U.S., but they had in fact been written, unknown to the Post, by the CIA.

Rosenfeld retired from the Post in 2000, and died after suffering from Parkinson's disease.
