= New England Newspapers, Inc. =

New England Newspapers Inc. (NENI) is a newspaper publisher based in Pittsfield, Massachusetts. It publishes The Berkshire Eagle.

In 2016, New England Newspapers was purchased from Digital First Media by a group of Berkshire-based investors. In 2021, New England Newspapers announced they were selling three newspapers and a magazine from Vermont to Vermont News and Media. After selling their properties in Vermont, the company states they are now "fully focused on producing and distributing content focused on the Berkshires."
