= WIOM-LP =

FM radio station

- Springfield, Massachusetts; United States
- Broadcast area: Pioneer Valley
- Frequency: 101.7 MHz
- Branding: The Lighter Side of Springfield

Programming
- Format: Adult contemporary

Ownership
- Owner: Media Preservation Foundation

History
- First air date: November 4, 2017
- Call sign meaning: Indian Orchard, Massachusetts

Technical information
- Licensing authority: FCC
- Facility ID: 192781
- Class: L1
- ERP: 100 watts
- HAAT: 4.58 meters (15.0 ft)
- Transmitter coordinates: 42°09′41″N 72°30′14″W

Links
- Public license information: LMS
- Webcast: Listen Live (via Live365); Listen Live (via MP3)
- Website: wiom.org

WIOM-LP (101.7 FM, "The Lighter Side of Springfield") is a non-profit, non-commercial low-power FM radio station licensed to serve Springfield, Massachusetts. It is a broadcast service of Media Preservation Foundation, and broadcasts an adult contemporary format. The radio station streams on Live365.

== See also ==
- List of radio stations in Massachusetts
