= Alan Cooperman =

Alan Cooperman is director of religion research at the Pew Research Center.

== Early life and education ==
Cooperman is from Berkshire County in Western Massachusetts. He graduated magna cum laude from Harvard University in 1982 and started in journalism at The Berkshire Eagle in Pittsfield, Massachusetts.

== Career ==
Before joining Pew Research Center, he was a national reporter and editor at The Washington Post and a foreign correspondent for the Associated Press and U.S. News & World Report. During his time at the Associated Press, Cooperman attended Mikhail Gorbachev's resignation speech from the presidency of the Soviet Union.

According to Pew Research Center, he is considered an expert on religion's role and statistics in the United States politics and he has also reported on religion in Russia, the Middle East and Europe. During his time at Pew Research Center, Cooperman has authored of Mormons in America, Muslim Americans, the U.S. Religious Knowledge Survey, “Nones” on the Rise and A Portrait of Jewish Americans.
