= Aircheck =

Radio or TV recording

Aircheck is the radio industry term for a recording that has dual meanings: a demonstration to show off the talent of an announcer or programmer to a prospective employer, and an archival record of content broadcast over-the-air made for legal archiving purposes. With evolving technology, the term came to be applied in the television industry as well.

A scoped (short for "telescoped"—by analogy with pressing the ends of a hand-held telescope to reduce its size) aircheck usually contains only segments where the announcer is actually talking, along with a bit of the music or commercial on either side. In an unscoped aircheck, all programming is left intact and unedited, including music, commercials, newscasts, jingles and other on-air events.

The term is also applied by some to recordings made "off-the-air" by listeners, using consumer or semi-professional equipment. These airchecks became more common with the advent of commercial cassette recorders.

== History ==
One of the oldest known surviving airchecks consists of a 15-minute broadcast by Bing Crosby on Los Angeles station KHJ and the CBS network from September 2, 1931. It was recorded by the RCA Victor company of Hollywood and is fully documented in the Victor files at the National Archives. The recordings were made by RCA Victor at the request of rival network NBC, which apparently wanted to monitor the then-rising young singer. The sound of the recording suggests that it was made by placing an open microphone before a high-quality radio (a method known in the radio trade as a "mic-feed").

== Methods ==
Airchecks can be recorded directly off the air (from a tuner or modulation monitor), from the pre-air feed that goes into the transmitter (which has usually been modified by the station's processing), or directly from before the station's processing has been applied.

Some radio stations used "logger reels" for airchecks. On these large reels of tape would be recorded the air signal at super-slow speeds. These reels were kept by the station for regulatory purposes (e.g. to provide an audio record that commercials ran as logged or to confirm aired content after allegations of inappropriate content). After a time, normally around 30 days for most stations, these logger reels would be reused or discarded.

Many airchecks are made by the announcers themselves on a recorder that begins recording when the microphone is turned on and then goes into pause when the microphone goes off. In the 1960s and 1970s reels of tape were used for these "skimmer" airchecks. Later it was cassettes. Today most stations use computer digital recordings (usually MP3 or WAV) for aircheck creation.

Airchecks made by listeners, generally with consumer-grade equipment, are often lost to poor quality copies made with tape playback machines that are not aligned to the recording machine. Many airchecks were made to record DXing reception, which often included fading, static and interference.

== Uses ==
DJs use airchecks to critique themselves, sometimes with the Program Director listening along with them to provide suggestions for improvements. Announcers keep some of their airchecks as "audio snapshots" of their career.

Airchecks are also recorded at radio stations to send to clients to demonstrate how their live commercials, remote breaks or contests sounded.

Some airchecks of older radio programs are highly prized by collectors, due to their nostalgia value. For example, baby boomers often enjoy listening to airchecks recorded from Top 40 radio stations in the 1960s and 1970s, particularly if they are airchecks of the same stations that the person listened to when they were a teenager or young adult. Many such airchecks were made in the 1960s by DJs who then sent them to troops in the Vietnam War, and a surprising number have survived. Another class of aircheck has to do with transitions between programming formats on a given station, where recordings are made of the final hours of an old format or early beginnings of a new format.

A large number of airchecks have survived from listeners during the Top 40 era, many of whom recorded talented DJs to learn how to be DJs, and many who recorded Top 40 music because it was cheaper than buying the 45s. Still others were, and still are, recorded by radio personalities themselves for archiving their own work. Many have been donated to online aircheck "museums", such as Reelradio, Airchexx.com by Archivist Steve West in Connecticut, and Rock Radio Scrapbook by Dale Patterson in Canada.

An example of the high quality of many of these archived broadcasts is a recording of Dan Taylor on 66 WNBC New York during the station's weekend "Time Machine" format from January 16, 1988, the final year of WNBC's existence as a radio station from Airchexx.com.

== For television ==
Airchecks are also used in the television industry, mostly for billing purposes. An aircheck is the only accurate record of what aired on a TV station. Stations generally retain airchecks for one year.

Generally, airchecks are recorded by the master control department of most TV stations. From 1950 through the early 1970's it was cheaper to film the TV screen with a special synchronized 16mm camera loaded with B&W newsreel film, a process referred to as Kinescoping. Later with the advent of inexpensive home video tapes, VHS became the standard. A special recorder was used to get an entire 24-hour day on one tape, skipping frames so that one frame was recorded every 5 seconds. Some stations used three 8-hour tapes per day, one per shift. On this tape is the video of the off-air receiver at the station recording what was actually broadcast; usually there is a time-of-day graphic superimposed over the video to keep track of what aired and when it aired. This was all that was necessary for the Sales & Traffic departments to prove to an advertiser that his commercial ran.

A lot of CBS 16mm Kinescope B&W Airchecks survive in archives as late as 1975's "Hudson Brothers Razzle Dazzle Show" and the notable 1975 episode of "All In The Family" that transitioned "The Jeffersons" spin-off show. All original commercials and voice-over announcements are there as broadcast, but only in B&W.

Some ad agencies did their own Airchecks, having recorders tuned to each of the local stations.

Most local TV programs (and network TV broadcasts on local affiliated stations) were not recorded until the early 1970s, when video tape became available to consumers. With the advent of video sharing websites such as YouTube, video airchecks have been posted, and made viewable by the public, of TV programs (including news programs, sporting events, short-lived sitcoms and game shows) not seen since their original broadcast, or otherwise previously considered rare or even lost.
