= James Brooke (journalist) =

American journalist (born 1955)

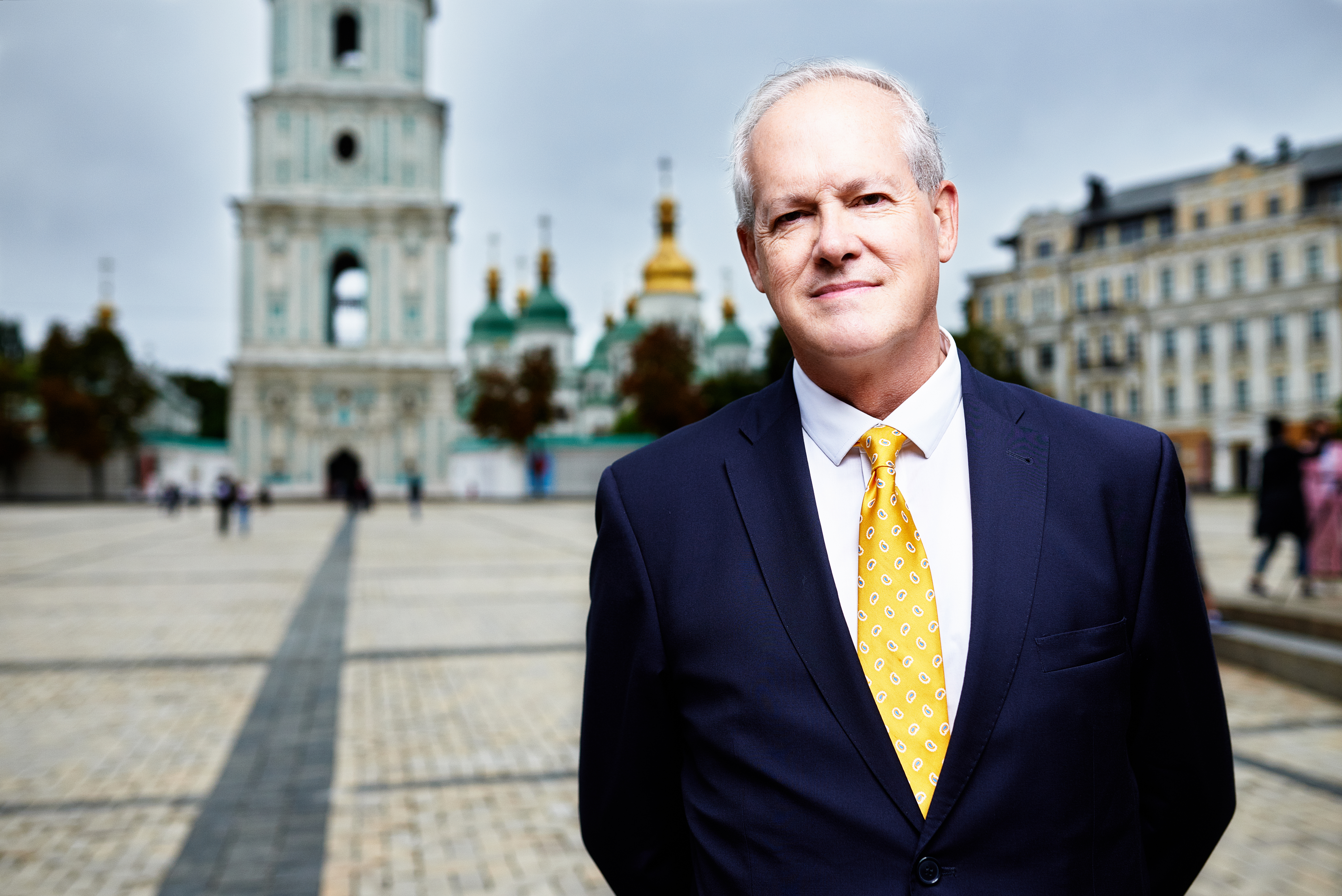
- Born: James Bettner Brooke; February 21, 1955 (age 71); New York City, United States
- Occupation: Journalist
- Notable credit(s): Bloomberg News, The New York Times, the Miami Herald, The Berkshire Eagle

James Bettner Brooke (born February 21, 1955, in New York City) is an American journalist who currently serves as editor in chief of the Ukraine Business News, an English-language subscription news site based in Kyiv, Ukraine. Previously, he was editor in chief of the English-language Khmer Times newspaper, in Cambodia. From 2010 to 2014, he was the Russia/former Soviet Union Bureau Chief for Voice of America (VOA), based in Moscow. For VOA, he wrote Russia Watch, a weekly blog. Previously, he worked as Moscow Bureau Chief for Bloomberg. Before Bloomberg, he reported for 24 years for The New York Times, largely overseas in countries such as Japan, South Korea, Ivory Coast and Brazil.

Posts held by Brooke at The New York Times have included:

- Assistant to James Reston, Washington columnist, 1978–80
- Metropolitan Reporter, 1984–86
- Bureau Chief, Abidjan, Ivory Coast, December 1986–January 1989
- Bureau Chief, Rio de Janeiro, Brazil, February 1989–July 1995
- Rocky Mountain Bureau Chief, Denver, Colorado, August 1995–1999
- Bureau Chief, Canada, August 1999–2001
- East Asia correspondent (Japan, South Korea, North Korea) based in Tokyo, August 2001–June 2006
- Bureau Chief, Tokyo, succeeded Howard W. French, August 2001-August 2003

Brooke graduated from Yale University with a BA degree in Latin American studies and was a stringer for United Press International as a student. In 1976, he spent a semester at the Pontificia Universidade Catolica in Rio de Janeiro. Brooke remains an active alum with Yale. He serves as President of the Yale Club of Berkshire County, and in 2025 ‒ as negotiations began to end the Russo-Ukrainian War ‒ he served as speaker for a Yale alumni event hosted by the Yale Club of Hartford on "What's Next for Ukraine?".

After graduation, Brooke was a freelance reporter and part-time staffer at The Berkshire Eagle in Massachusetts from June 1977 to April 1978. Prior to joining the Times as a reporter in 1984, he was the South American correspondent for the Miami Herald.
