= WESX =

- Nahant, Massachusetts; United States
- Broadcast area: Greater Boston
- Frequency: 1230 kHz
- Branding: WESX 1230 AM

Programming
- Format: Religious; ethnic

Ownership
- Owner: Real Media Group, LLC
- Sister stations: WJDA

History
- First air date: December 10, 1939
- Former frequencies: 1200 kHz (1939–1941)
- Call sign meaning: Essex County

Technical information
- Licensing authority: FCC
- Facility ID: 49301
- Class: C
- Power: 450 watts
- Transmitter coordinates: 42°27′10.35″N 70°58′48.18″W

Links
- Public license information: Public file; LMS
- Webcast: Listen live

WESX (1230 AM) is a radio station broadcasting a religious and multi-cultural format, licensed to broadcast in the Nahant, Massachusetts, precinct. The station is owned by Real Media Group, LLC.

Programming is in Spanish, Portuguese, Creole, and English. The transmitter is located in Lynn, Massachusetts, with studios located in Chelsea.

== History ==
WESX made its debut on December 10, 1939, at 1200 kHz on the AM band, with studios in Salem, Massachusetts; the transmitter was in Marblehead. The station's original owner was Charles W. Phelan, who had been the director of sales for the Yankee Network in Boston from 1928 to early 1939. The station's first program manager also came from the Yankee Network— Van D. Sheldon, who had most recently been in charge of the Artists Bureau, where he auditioned and hired the bands that performed on the air. The programming and advertising on WESX targeted the cities and towns north of Boston, the area known as the North Shore. But by 1949, Phelan was in poor health; in early November, he sold the station to James D. Asher and Joseph H. Tobin, who also owned radio station WJDA in Quincy.

After James D. Asher died in 1973, his son Jay ran the stations until May 2006, at which time they were sold to Otto Miller, who changed both stations from their full-service (news, talk, local sports, music) format to a Spanish-language format. In 2017, the Principle Broadcasting Network sold its stations — WESX, WJDA, and WLIE in Islip, New York — to Universal Stations for $2.3 million; Universal's principals were also associated with Principle. Universal Stations sold WESX and WJDA to Real Media Group effective August 9, 2018.

== BBC Up All Night ==
In 2004, BBC News presenter Rhod Sharp moved to Marblehead, Massachusetts. Wishing to continue to broadcast the BBC Radio 5 Live show Up All Night, he made an arrangement with WESX's owners to use the studios and ISDN line to connect him with Broadcasting House in London, England. The arrangement came to an end in 2007, when Sharp and his wife moved to an 18th-century house in Marblehead's Old Town section, which included a suitably equipped home-studio.
