= WREB (Massachusetts) =

Radio station in Holyoke, Massachusetts (1950–1991)

- Holyoke, Massachusetts; United States
- Broadcast area: Western Massachusetts
- Frequency: 930 kHz

Ownership
- Owner: Valley Broadcasting Corporation (1950–1961); Don Hancock Broadcasting, Inc. (1961–1965); Algonquin Broadcasting (1965–1987); Dumont Holding Company (1987–1991)

History
- First air date: September 13, 1950
- Last air date: September 1991

Technical information
- Facility ID: 17727
- Class: III-D (later D)
- Power: 500 watts

WREB was a radio station licensed to Holyoke, Massachusetts, broadcasting at 930 AM. WREB went on the air on September 13, 1950 and ceased operations 41 years later in September 1991. Its FCC license was canceled on December 17, 1992. The call letters were reassigned and are now used by an FM radio station in Greencastle, Indiana.

WREB-AM was a 500-watt daytime, omnidirectional station. They were a music station playing primarily middle of the road music through the 1960s. In 1968 there was summer evening rock show called "The Man From REB". Weekends were heavily religious and ethnic, including music programs in French (Leon Allary), Polish (Chet Dragon) and Italian. Local high school football was featured on Saturday afternoons. In 1971 they switched from MOR to a country music format with Cal McLain doing the morning show. In 1972 they switched to a talk format headlined by Tracy Cole, but continued with country music on the weekends and summer evenings. Long term on-air personalities were Wayne Dennis (PD, DJ and sports), Barbara Heisler (DJ and talk), Richard LaVigne (news & commentary) and Steve Hudgik (DJ). During the mid 1980s, the lineup featured Jonathan Evans, Ray Kelly (later associate editor of The Republican), G. Michael Dobbs, who would go on to serve as the managing editor of The Reminder publications; and future newspaper columnist Ron Chimelis.

WREB had studios at 300 High Street in downtown Holyoke before moving to nearby Suffolk Street; its transmitter was in Fairview (Chicopee).
