= WGAJ =

- Deerfield, Massachusetts; United States
- Frequency: 91.7 MHz

Ownership
- Owner: Deerfield Academy

History
- First air date: May 1982
- Last air date: May 19, 2009

Technical information
- Facility ID: 68194
- Class: A
- ERP: 100 watts
- HAAT: 95.0 meters (311.7 ft)
- Transmitter coordinates: 42°32′5.00″N 72°35′32.00″W

WGAJ (91.7 FM) was a radio station broadcasting an album oriented rock format, as well as live broadcasts of sporting and cultural events of Deerfield Academy. Licensed to Deerfield, Massachusetts, United States, the station was formerly owned by Trustees of Deerfield Academy, offering students an opportunity to learn broadcast technology and operations with a working radio station. WGAJ FM went silent on May 19, 2009.

In July 2010 the Trustees of Deerfield Academy filed with the Federal Communications Commission to assign WGAJ's license to WFCR Foundation, Inc., owner of WFCR in Amherst, Massachusetts. The sale price was $10,000. The commission approved the sale on August 19, 2010.

The station call letters were changed to WNNZ-FM and it now carries NPR news/talk programming full-time.

== See also ==
- WFCR
