= WWEI =

Radio station in Easthampton, Massachusetts

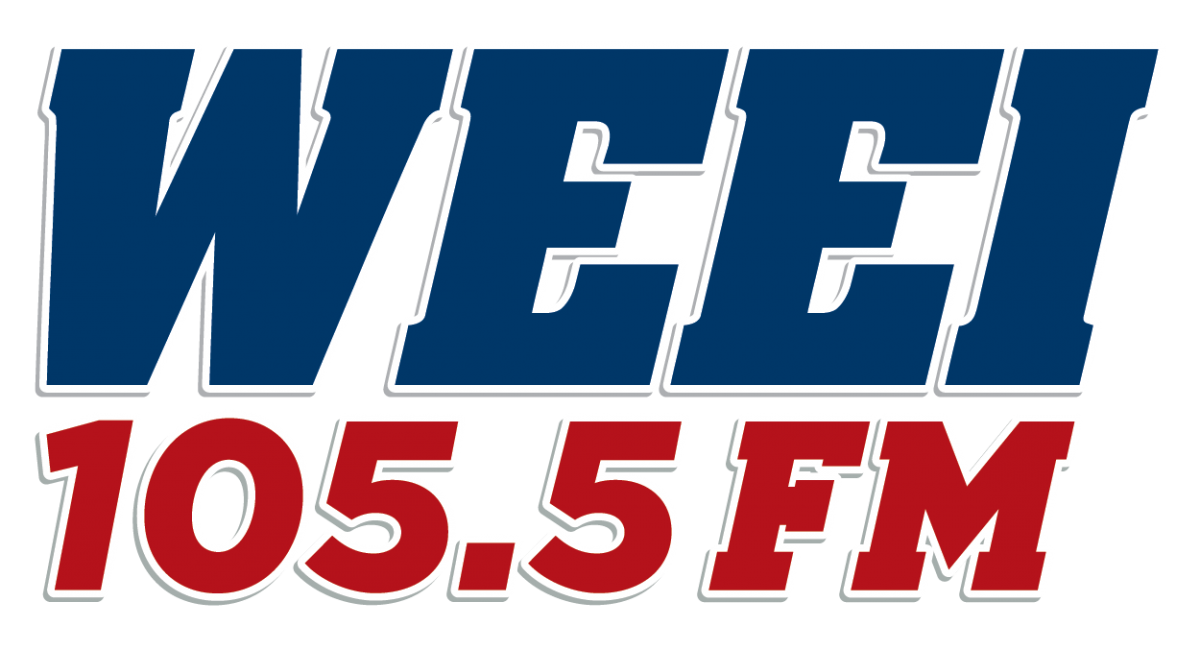
- Easthampton, Massachusetts; United States
- Broadcast area: Springfield, Massachusetts
- Frequency: 105.5 MHz (HD Radio)
- Branding: 105.5 WEEI

Programming
- Language: English
- Format: Sports radio
- Subchannels: HD2: "WAAF" (active rock)
- Affiliations: WEEI Sports Radio Network; Westwood One Sports; Boston Red Sox Radio Network; Boston Bruins Radio Network; Boston Celtics Radio Network; Westwood One

Ownership
- Owner: Audacy, Inc.; (Audacy License, LLC)
- Sister stations: WHLL; WMAS-FM

History
- First air date: October 1967
- Former call signs: WQRB-FM (1967); WQRB (1967–79); WBEC-FM (1979–2006); WVEI-FM (2006–11)
- Call sign meaning: similar to WEEI

Technical information
- Licensing authority: FCC
- Facility ID: 11295
- Class: A
- ERP: 720 watts (horizontal); 706 watts (vertical)
- HAAT: 280 meters (920 ft)
- Transmitter coordinates: 42°14′29.3″N 72°38′55.3″W (NAD83)

Links
- Public license information: Public file; LMS
- Webcast: Listen live (via Audacy); Listen live (via Audacy) (HD2)
- Website: www.audacy.com/weei/network/weei-1055fm-springfield; www.audacy.com/waaf (HD2)

WWEI (105.5 FM; "105.5 WEEI") is a radio station in Easthampton, Massachusetts, serving Springfield with a sports radio format. The station is owned by Audacy, Inc. Most programming is provided by Boston sister station WEEI-FM.

== History ==
The 105.5 MHz frequency used by WWEI was originally allocated to Pittsfield, Massachusetts, where it signed on in October 1967 as WQRB-FM. It was co-owned with WBEC (1420 AM), though it offered its own programming; this was a middle-of-the-road format by 1972. The station became WBEC-FM in 1979, upon adopting an album-oriented rock format. During the 1980s, the station shifted to more of a contemporary hit radio format.

Vox Media acquired the WBEC stations in 2002. Two years later, to accommodate then-sister station WNYQ (now WQBK-FM)'s move to Malta, New York, Vox filed to move WBEC-FM to Easthampton in 2004. Vox then put the station up for sale, and after an unsuccessful attempt to sell it to Pamal Broadcasting, it was sold to Entercom (forerunner to Audacy, Inc.) in 2006. WBEC-FM signed off from Pittsfield that May, with the format and call letters moving to 95.9 FM (a former frequency of WUPE-FM) at that time. The current incarnation of the station signed on as WVEI-FM from Easthampton on October 26, 2006. The call letters were changed to WWEI on September 14, 2011.

On June 13, 2012, it was announced that WWEI would carry UMass Minutemen football and UMass Minutemen basketball games. In the event of conflicts with Boston Red Sox and Boston Celtics broadcasts, station manager David Oldread said "his station would prefer to keep UMass as the priority". As part of the deal, every Thursday at 7 p.m., WWEI airs The Coaches Show hosted by UMass Football analyst Matt Goldstein (with interviews with head UMass Football coach and head UMass Basketball coach) over WEEI programming. Also, every Friday at 7 p.m. during Springfield Falcons hockey season, WWEI airs The Old Time Hockey Show, which discusses the Falcons, the Boston Bruins, and the NHL.

WWEI formerly carried Fox Sports Radio in the overnight hours, even after parent station WEEI switched to ESPN Radio in 2009; at that time, ESPN programming was heard in Springfield on WHLL. At midnight on January 1, 2013, WWEI assumed the ESPN Radio affiliation, after WHLL switched to CBS Sports Radio.

=== 2020 signal hijacking ===
During the 2020 United States Presidential Election, the station's signal received interference from a pirate radio station on the same frequency in Warren, looping a recording of a whispering voice that said "Don't be a chump, vote for Trump." As of November 4, 2020, attempts to contact the FCC were unsuccessful.
