= WLHZ-LP =

- Springfield, Massachusetts; United States
- Frequency: 107.9 MHz
- Branding: UncionFM 107.9

Programming
- Language: Spanish
- Format: Religious radio

Ownership
- Owner: Pentecostal Church Refuge Of Salvation; (La Hora Ministerio)

History
- First air date: 2008
- Call sign meaning: "La Hora Zero" (Zero Hour in Spanish)

Technical information
- Licensing authority: FCC
- Facility ID: 134242
- Class: L1
- ERP: 7 watts
- HAAT: 112 meters (367 ft)
- Transmitter coordinates: 42°9′0″N 72°41′17″W

Links
- Public license information: LMS
- Webcast: Listen live
- Website: www.uncionfm.com

WLHZ-LP (107.9 FM, "UncionFM 107.9") is a radio station licensed to serve Springfield, Massachusetts. The station is owned by Pentecostal Church Refuge Of Salvation. It airs a Spanish-language religious radio format.

The station was assigned the WLHZ-LP call letters by the Federal Communications Commission on February 11, 2008.

Another Spanish-language religious station, WREA-LP in Holyoke, had also been assigned to WLHZ-LP's original 104.9 MHz frequency but in March 2008 WLHZ-LP received a construction permit from the FCC to relocate to 107.9 MHz to avoid interference with WREA-LP.

WLHZ-LP currently transmits from the AT&T mobility tower on East Mountain in Westfield. WLHZ-LP applied to change frequency to 98.7 on February 29, 2012, to alleviate interference issues from "(a) first adjacent FM station".
