= Media Preservation Foundation =

US archive of radio station jingles

Media Preservation Foundation is a United States 501(c)(3) non-profit organization dedicated to the archival of media history mainly aimed towards radio and television identification and associated items. It was established in 1994 by Tracy E. Carman and Donald Worsham as an archive for documents and important recordings related to the broadcasting industry.

The Foundation has managed to acquire a large collection of items from both current and defunct producers including TM Studios, PAMS, JAM Creative Productions, Johnson & Siday, Futuresonic, FairWest, Wm Meeks Productions, Johnny Mann, Music Makers, Pepper/Tanner, Media General, Jodie Lyons (a/k/a Joseph Callaway Lyons - b.1/3/1930 Jacksonville, FL - d.1/10/2011 Georgetown TX), Tom Merriman, Tony Griffin Productions, Thompson Creative Productions and many others. It is the Foundation's goal to acquire as much of these materials as possible to facilitate the availability of these items for research and other purposes.

Media Preservation Foundation has also been known for providing materials back to media outlets, primarily radio stations, who are in the process of creating historic retrospectives of their history. Media Preservation Foundation aids those companies in the media that were not good at keeping copies of their own histories and materials.

In addition to ID Jingles, the foundation has a large collection of archives for Audacy, Inc.'s WTIC Radio in Hartford, Connecticut; iHeartRadio's WHYN Radio in Springfield, Massachusetts and many others. The Foundation has also acquired materials from private collectors including the archives of the late Francis Holler, Jr. (a/k/a Frank Holler - d.10/15/2015 Newington CT) in December 2015. Multiple warehouses containing thousands of reels, DATs CDs, Cassettes and even transcription disks is maintained by the Foundation in Indian Orchard, Springfield, Massachusetts. Some Foundation archives are also housed in Northridge, California. Types of jingles preserved by the foundation also include Emergency Broadcast System jingles.

Media Preservation Foundation has published a definitive history book on ID Jingles called, The Hits Between The Hits: The History Of Radio ID Jingles. It is authored by former foundation director Donald Worsham.

== History ==
In 2000, Media Preservation Foundation established a fund for another non-profit organization, REELRADIO, while REELRADIO was in the process of obtaining its tax-exempt status. Although separate organizations, they share similar purposes.

On June 1, 2011, some of the Foundation's archives were damaged during the 2011 New England tornado outbreak.

In late 2013, they moved their storage facilities out of Springfield, Mass., to Indian Orchard Mills in Indian Orchard, Springfield, Mass., which is actually a part of the city of Springfield.

Beginning in November of 2017, WIOM-LP, broadcasting on 101.7 FM in Springfield, is a broadcast service of Media Preservation Foundation. WIOM runs an Adult Contemporary format targeting the neighborhood of Indian Orchard.
