= WREA-LP =

- Holyoke, Massachusetts; United States
- Frequency: 104.9 MHz
- Branding: Radio Redentor

Programming
- Format: Spanish Religious

Ownership
- Owner: Radio Redentor

History
- First air date: 2005

Technical information
- Licensing authority: FCC
- Facility ID: 134302
- Class: L1
- ERP: 48 watts
- HAAT: 43.1 meters (142 feet)
- Transmitter coordinates: 42°11′15.3″N 72°38′28.3″W

Links
- Public license information: LMS

WREA-LP (104.9 FM, "Radio Redentor") is a radio station licensed to serve Holyoke, Massachusetts. The station is owned by Radio Redentor. It airs Spanish-language religious programming.

The station was assigned the WREA-LP call letters by the Federal Communications Commission on November 29, 2005.

Another Spanish-language religious station, WLHZ-LP in Springfield, had also been assigned the 104.9 MHz frequency but in March 2008 received a construction permit from the FCC to relocate to 107.9 MHz to avoid interference with WREA-LP.

It went silent on June 30, 2026.
