= WNEK-FM =

- Springfield, Massachusetts; United States
- Broadcast area: Springfield, Massachusetts
- Frequency: 105.1 MHz

Ownership
- Owner: Western New England University

History
- First air date: February 17, 1976
- Last air date: April 1, 2014
- Former call signs: WTRZ (1976–1979)
- Call sign meaning: "Western New England Kollege [sic]"

Technical information
- Facility ID: 71902
- Class: D
- ERP: 13 watts
- HAAT: −7 meters (−23 ft)
- Transmitter coordinates: 42°6′55.00″N 72°31′5.00″W

WNEK-FM (105.1 FM) was a radio station broadcasting a college radio format. Licensed to Springfield, Massachusetts, United States, the station served as a student-run organization. The station was owned by Western New England University.

WNEK-FM went streaming on the internet on April 14, 2010. WNEK-FM did not file to renew its license by December 2, 2013; instead, on March 26, 2014, Western New England University informed the Federal Communications Commission that the station's license would be allowed to expire on April 1. The station originally held the call sign WTRZ, named after Dean of Students Theodore R. Zern; it became WNEK-FM in 1979. Before its last presence on 105.1, WNEK (WTRZ) was located at 89.1, 97.5, and 99.7. Currently, you can access the station via online radio sites.
