= WAMH =

Semi-satellite of WFCR HD-2, Amherst, Massachusetts
- Amherst, Massachusetts; United States
- Broadcast area: Pioneer Valley
- Frequency: 89.3 MHz

Programming
- Format: College radio; public radio
- Affiliations: New England Public Media

Ownership
- Owner: Amherst College; (Trustees of Amherst College)

History
- First air date: 1955
- Former call signs: WAMF (1955–1971)
- Call sign meaning: Amherst

Technical information
- Licensing authority: FCC
- Facility ID: 68222
- Class: A
- ERP: 130 watts
- HAAT: 233 meters (764 ft)
- Transmitter coordinates: 42°21′49.3″N 72°25′22.3″W

Links
- Public license information: Public file; LMS
- Webcast: Listen live
- Website: Official Website

WAMH (89.3 FM) is a radio station occasionally broadcasting an alternative rock format. It is licensed to Amherst, Massachusetts, United States, and the station is owned by Amherst College. Programming has included independent artists, news, college sports, and live local music. Since September 2015, when the college is in session the station splits broadcast time between student programming from 4:00 p.m. to 2:00 a.m. and a relay of NEPM Classical broadcasting at other hours.

The station is federally licensed by the Federal Communications Commission (FCC) and non-commercial, and is under the supervision of the Amherst College Board of Trustees.

WAMH broadcasts from an antenna adjacent to the WFCR tower on Mount Lincoln in Pelham, Massachusetts. Nielsen Broadcast Data Systems ratings as of January 2018 found that over 3,500 listeners tune in to WAMH during the 10 hours of student programming each day.

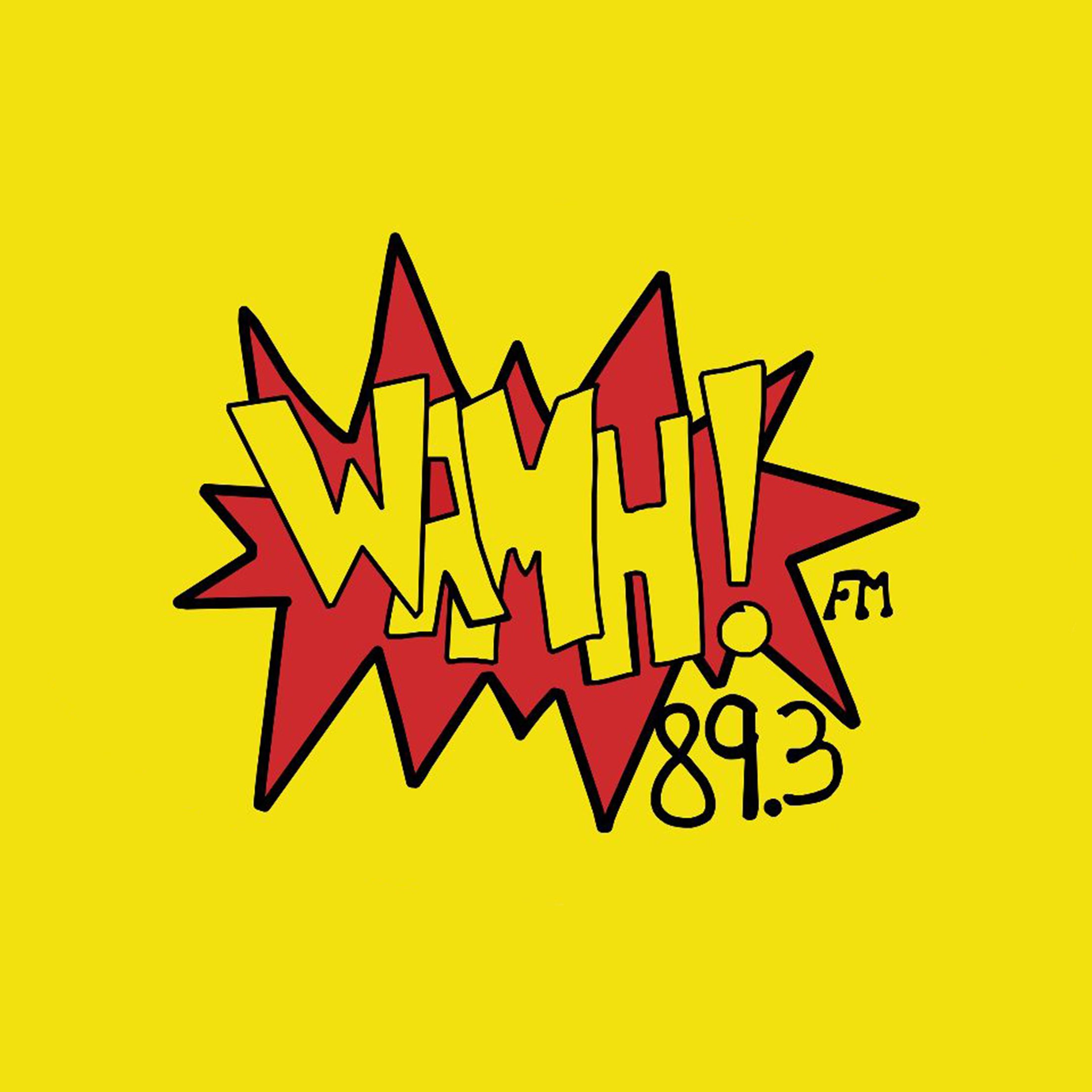
Former logo

The station originally used the call sign WAMF; it became WAMH on March 22, 1971.

== See also ==
- Campus radio
- List of college radio stations in the United States
- WFCR
