= WJXP =

Radio station in Fitchburg, Massachusetts (2011–2020)

Fitchburg, Massachusetts; United States
- Frequency: 90.1 MHz

Programming
- Format: Christian

Ownership
- Owner: Epic Light Network, Inc.

History
- First air date: 2011
- Last air date: February 24, 2020

Technical information
- Licensing authority: FCC
- Facility ID: 177374
- Class: A
- ERP: 750 watts
- HAAT: 25 meters (82 ft)
- Transmitter coordinates: 42°32′34.3″N 71°51′10.2″W

Links
- Public license information: Public file; LMS

WJXP (90.1 FM) was a radio station licensed to serve Fitchburg, Massachusetts. The station was owned by Epic Light Network, Inc. It began broadcasting in 2011, and was owned by Horizon Christian Fellowship, airing a Christian format as an affiliate of RenewFM. On February 19, 2019, the station went silent. The station again went silent on February 24, 2020, for technical reasons. Effective November 24, 2020, the station was sold to Epic Light Network, Inc.

WJXP's license was cancelled on April 1, 2022, for failing to file a renewal application.
