= WJDA =

Radio station in Quincy, Massachusetts

- Quincy, Massachusetts; United States
- Broadcast area: Greater Boston
- Frequency: 1300 kHz
- Branding: Latina 99.9 FM

Programming
- Format: Reggaeton

Ownership
- Owner: Real Media Group, LLC
- Sister stations: WESX

History
- First air date: September 12, 1947
- Call sign meaning: James D. Asher (former owner)

Technical information
- Licensing authority: FCC
- Facility ID: 61159
- Class: D
- Power: 1,000 watts day; 72 watts night
- Transmitter coordinates: 42°15′35.36″N 70°58′34.17″W
- Translator: 99.9 W260DS (Boston)

Links
- Public license information: Public file; LMS
- Webcast: Listen live
- Website: latinafmboston.com

WJDA (1300 AM) is a radio station with a broadcast tower in Quincy, Massachusetts, serving the Greater Boston area with a reggaeton format. The station's studios are in Chelsea. Its programming is also heard on FM translator W260DS (99.9) in Boston, from which its "Latina 99.9" branding is derived.

== History ==
The station began in 1947 as a local station for the South Shore region, owned by James D. Asher and later by his son Jay. For much of its history, WJDA provided talk programming and (in later years) ABC Radio's Unforgettable Favorites satellite soft AC format, operating under the branding "Radio your way." Among its on-air personalities were Herb Fontaine, Roy Lind, Joe Catalano, Win Bettinson, Ken Coleman, Don Kent, and Mike Logan. Notable shows included Party Line, Breakfast with WJDA, and the Wax Museum. The station was a daytimer for most of its history, broadcasting until sundown, but became 24-hour in the early 1990s.

The station (and its North Shore sister station WESX) was sold in 2006 to Principle Broadcasting, which switched the station to a Spanish and Portuguese-language programming format and closed the local studios. Its last day of operation under the old format was April 30, 2006.

Tropical Storm Irene toppled the station's tower on August 28, 2011; the station was off air for a few days, then received FCC approval for a temporary long-wire antenna. In April 2012, the tower was restored.

In 2017, the Principal Broadcasting Network sold its stations — WJDA, WESX, and WLIE in Islip, New York — to Universal Stations for $2.3 million; Universal's principals were also associated with Principal. Universal Stations sold WJDA and WESX to Real Media Group effective on August 9, 2018.

== Translator ==
Call sign	Frequency	City of license	FID	ERP (W)	Class	Transmitter coordinates	FCC info
W260DS	99.9 FM	Boston, Massachusetts	202747	250	D	42°20′57″N 71°4′29″W	LMS
