= WNAW =

Radio station in North Adams, Massachusetts

- North Adams, Massachusetts; United States
- Broadcast area: Berkshire County
- Frequency: 1230 kHz
- Branding: New Country 94.7

Programming
- Format: Country
- Affiliations: ABC News Radio; Boston Bruins Radio Network; Boston Celtics Radio Network; Boston Red Sox Radio Network; New England Patriots Radio Network

Ownership
- Owner: Townsquare Media; (Townsquare License, LLC)
- Sister stations: WBEC; WBEC-FM; WSBS; WUPE-FM

History
- First air date: November 23, 1947
- Former call signs: WMNB (1947–1988)
- Call sign meaning: North Adams, Williamstown

Technical information
- Licensing authority: FCC
- Facility ID: 4823
- Class: C
- Power: 1,000 watts unlimited
- Transmitter coordinates: 42°41′3.3″N 73°6′21.37″W
- Translator: 94.7 W234DD (North Adams)

Links
- Public license information: Public file; LMS
- Webcast: Listen live
- Website: wnaw.com

WNAW (1230 AM, "New Country 94.7") is a radio station broadcasting a country music format. Licensed to North Adams, Massachusetts, United States, the station serves northern Berkshire County. The station is owned by Townsquare Media (through licensee subsidiary Townsquare License, LLC), and features programming from ABC News Radio. Its programming is also heard on FM translator W234DD (94.7).

== History ==
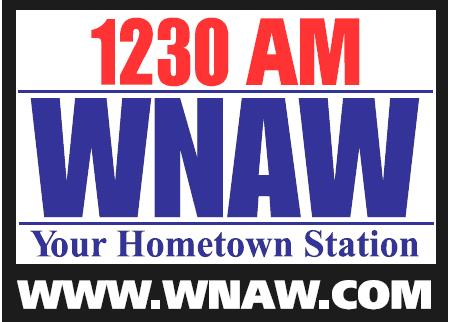
Logo as an adult contemporary station

The station went on the air on November 23, 1947, as WMNB, owned by the Hardman family along with the North Adams Transcript. The Hardmans sold Northern Berkshire Broadcasting to Donald A. Thurston in April 1966. In August 2013, Gamma Broadcasting reached a deal to sell its Berkshire County radio stations, including WNAW, to Reed Miami Holdings; the sale was canceled on December 30, 2013. In October 2016, Gamma agreed to sell its stations to Galaxy Communications; that sale also fell through, and in 2017 the stations were acquired by Townsquare Media.

On March 1, 2021, WNAW changed its format from adult contemporary to country, branded as "New Country 94.7" (reflecting its simulcast on FM translator W234DD 94.7).

== Translator ==
Call sign	Frequency	City of license	FID	ERP (W)	Class	Transmitter coordinates	FCC info
W234DD	94.7 FM	North Adams, Massachusetts	201077	250	D	42°41′54.2″N 73°3′52.3″W	LMS
