= The Berkshire Eagle =

Newspaper in Pittsfield, Massachusetts, US

- The 2 October 2020 front page of The Berkshire Eagle
- Type: Daily newspaper
- Format: Broadsheet
- Owner(s): New England Newspapers, Inc. (John C. "Hans" Morris, Fredric Rutberg, estate of Robert G. Wilmers)
- Publisher: Gary Lavariere
- Editor: Kevin Moran
- Founded: Daily since May 9, 1892, with weekly roots beginning with the Western Star, founded in Stockbridge, Massachusetts in 1789
- Language: English
- Headquarters: 75 South Church Street, Pittsfield, Massachusetts 01201, United States
- Circulation: For 12 months ending 30 August 2026: Average daily paid print: 6,900; Average daily paid digital-only: 10,721; Total paid circulation: 17,621
- ISSN: 0895-8793
- OCLC number: 12737059
- Website: berkshireeagle.com

The Berkshire Eagle is an American news organization based in Pittsfield, Massachusetts, and covering all of Berkshire County, as well as several New York communities near Pittsfield. It publishes The Berkshire Eagle, a print newspaper which is distributed five days per week (Tuesday-Saturday), a facsimile edition published six days per week (Monday-Saturday), and a website and mobile app (updated daily). It is considered a newspaper of record for Berkshire County, Massachusetts.

Published daily (Monday-Saturday) beginning 1892, The Eagle has been owned since 1 May 2016 by a group of local Berkshire County investors, who purchased The Eagle and its three Vermont sister newspapers for an undisclosed sum from Digital First Media.

The Eagle has won the New England Newspaper and Press Association's Newspaper of the Year Award for Sunday newspapers, weekday newspapers, or both, for eight consecutive years (2018-2025), as detailed in the awards section below.

== History ==
=== Origins ===
The Eagle's roots go back to a weekly newspaper, the Western Star, founded in Stockbridge, Massachusetts in 1789. Over time, this newspaper changed its name, ownership, and place of publication multiple times, but maintained continuity of publication:

- The Western Star, published in Stockbridge, Massachusetts from 1 December 1789 – 10 June 1794.
- The name was changed to Andrews's Western Star, published in Stockbridge from 17 June 1794 – 20 February 1797.
- The name reverted to The Western Star, published in Stockbridge from 27 February 1806 – 8 November 1806.
- Shortly after the final issue of The Western Star, a successor publication, The Berkshire Reporter, was launched nearby in Pittsfield, Massachusetts, on 17 January 1807. This issue was labeled as Volume 18, Number 1859, indicating continuity from The Western Star. The Berkshire Reporter continued until 23 November 1815.
- Meanwhile in Stockbridge, another weekly newspaper was launched, called the Farmer's Herald, published from 30 July 1808 – 1814.
- The name of the Farmer's Herald was changed to The Berkshire Herald in 1814; this publication continued until 23 November 1815 (the same as the last date of the Berkshire Reporter).
- The Berkshire Herald and the Berkshire Reporter merged, becoming The Berkshire Star, published in Stockbridge from 17 December 1815 – 3 January 1828.
- The name of The Berkshire Star was changed to The Berkshire Star and County Republican, published in Lenox, Massachusetts from 10 January 1828 – 28 August 1829.
- The name was changed to The Berkshire Journal, published in Lenox from 3 September 1829 – 25 August 1831.
- Meanwhile in Pittsfield, Massachusetts, a newspaper had been launched with the name The Argus, published from 24 May 1827 – 1 September 1831.
- The Berkshire Journal and The Argus merged to become The Journal and Argus, published in Lenox from September 1, 1831 – 20 August 1834.
- Finally the name of The Journal and Argus was changed to The Massachusetts Eagle in the issue of August 28, 1834. This was the first time the word “Eagle” appeared in the name of the publication, but based on the publishing dates, volume numbering, and ownership, there was a continuity of publication beginning with The Western Star in 1789.
- As of 7 January 1853, the name changed again to The Berkshire County Eagle.

=== Miller era ===
The weekly Berkshire County Eagle was purchased by Kelton Bedell Miller in 1891. The following year, on May 9, 1892, it commenced daily publication as The Berkshire Evening Eagle. The Berkshire County Eagle, however, remained a part of the paper, as a weekly section within the Wednesday edition of the daily, until 24 June 1953.

The Miller family retained ownership until 1995. After Kelton Bedell Miller died in 1941, ownership passed to his sons, Lawrence K. "Pete" Miller and Donald B. Miller, as editor and publisher, respectively.

The Miller brothers focused on hiring talent and building the quality of The Eagle's newsroom. The newspaper became known as a great place for graduates of journalism schools to begin their careers, and many of those reporters went on to renowned careers throughout the journalistic world in publications such as The New York Times, The Washington Post, The Wall Street Journal, Time magazine and others.

In 1947, The Eagle launched a radio station in Pittsfield, WBEC (AM). An FM affiliate was added in 1948, but the company gave up the FM license because too few people had FM receivers at the time. The radio station was sold during the 1950s to Richard S. Jackson.

In a 1973 Time magazine article about The Eagle, then Boston Globe editor Thomas Winship was quoted as calling The Eagle the best newspaper “of its size in the country.” The article mentions that the paper carried occasional book reviews from Berkshire County residents such as James MacGregor Burns and William L. Shirer. At the time, the paper had nearly 20 local columnists, 23 stringers and a news staff of 35, considered large for a paper its size. (Circulation was 32,000 at the time.)

Press critic Ben Bagdikian in 1972 stated that there were only three great newspapers in the world, each in its own way: The New York Times, Le Monde, and The Berkshire Eagle. The Washington Post, where he had served as editor and ombudsman, he said at the time, was “not yet a great paper.”

The Eagle launched a Sunday edition in 1987.

The next and final generation of Miller owners was headed by Michael G. Miller, grandson of Kelton Bedell Miller. In 1995 Michael Miller was president of The Eagle Publishing Company which then owned The Eagle, the Middletown Press in Middletown, Connecticut, and two daily newspapers in Vermont: the Bennington Banner and the Brattleboro Reformer, as well as a Vermont weekly newspaper, the Manchester Journal; his brother Mark C. Miller was editor of The Eagle, while brother Kelton B. Miller II was publisher of the Vermont newspapers. A sister, Margo Miller, a writer for The Boston Globe, sat on Eagle Publishing's board.

In 1989, the Millers chose to renovate, as a new headquarters and printing plant for their company, a factory building complex in Pittsfield, originally the Eaton, Crane & Pike Company Factory. As a result of a recession, the company was unable to service the debt it had assumed to finance this $23.5 million project. Failing to find a white knight to help them weather the fiscal storm that ensued, in 1995 the Millers sold their holdings to MediaNews Group, a company founded by William Dean Singleton of Denver, Colorado.

=== MediaNews era ===
The transaction closed on September 1, 1995. Simultaneously, MediaNews Group sold the Middletown Press to the Journal Register Company. The following year, MediaNews added the North Adams Transcript to its western New England holdings. In January 2014, the Transcript ceased operations and was merged into The Eagle.

Immediately upon acquiring The Eagle, MediaNews group reduced the newsroom staff of 40 by more than 25 percent. Later under MediaNews management, as newspapers in general faced increasing financial challenges there were multiple rounds of staff reductions as various functions were consolidated into centralized locations on a regional or national basis. All the while, subscription prices were increased despite falling circulation levels.

=== Return to local ownership ===
In April 2016, a team of local investors bought The Eagle, along with its Vermont sister newspapers the Bennington Banner, Brattleboro Reformer and Manchester Journal, from Digital First Media (DFM), the new name of MediaNews Group. The investor team consisted of former Visa Inc. President John C. "Hans" Morris, local retired judge Fredric D. Rutberg, M&T Bank Chairman Robert G. Wilmers and Stanford Lipsey, former publisher of The Buffalo News and former owner of the Omaha Sun newspaper group of Nebraska. Lipsey died November 1, 2016. Wilmers died in December, 2017.

In introducing the new ownership and its goals to The Eagle's readership, Rutberg wrote: “The goal is to make The Eagle a part of the finest community newspaper group in America....Our business plan is simple. By improving the quality and quantity of the content in our publications, we expect to increase our readership which will, in turn, increase our revenues, and ensure the future of these publications.”

Under the new owners, The Eagle has been able to hire additional newsroom staff, expanded its investigative team, and has launched new content including a Sunday arts-focused section called Landscapes. In 2022, The Eagle launched a quarterly glossy magazine, Berkshire Landscapes, and a monthly tabloid business newspaper, Berkshire Business Journal.

The new ownership group also invested in new systems in order to transition off the centralized DFM technical infrastructure, including a new content management system. They established a community advisory board including journalists Linda Greenhouse and Donald Morrison, and authors Simon Winchester and Elizabeth Kolbert, all of whom have Berkshire area connections, and representatives of many local non-profits and businesses.

In 2019, The Eagle's owners purchased a weekly newspaper, the Southern Berkshire Shopper's Guide, based in Great Barrington, Massachusetts.

In October, 2020, in response to economic challenges associated with the COVID-19 pandemic, The Eagle reduced its print frequency to five days per week, Tuesday through Saturday, with the traditional Sunday package of supplements and inserts moving into the Saturday slot. On Mondays, while there is no printed paper, an electronic facsimile of a printed newspaper is available, and the paper's website is updated seven days a week. The paper also announced a new strategic direction it calls Being Digital, which entails "moderniz[ing] and enhanc[ing] our digital presence by expanding our use of digital tools in our reporting that incorporates the use of podcasts, video, interactive graphics, and links to underlying references and sources."

In May, 2021, New England Newspapers, Inc. sold its Vermont newspapers to Vermont News and Media LLC, a company owned by Paul Belogour, a software entrepreneur.

In November, 2021, The Eagle completed the installation of a new printing press, a Goss Community SSC Magnum, and in August, 2022 it completed a major renovation of its office space.

In March, 2023, The Eagle relaunched its quarterly magazine, renaming it from Berkshire Landscapes to The B.

In June, 2023, The Eagle launched a new website, BerkshiresWeek.com, as a source of information about events and experiences in the Berkshires.

In October, 2025, Gary Lavariere, previously the paper's chief revenue officer, succeeded Fredric Rutberg as publisher. Rutberg continued to serve as president of the company.

== Awards and honors ==
In 1973, Roger B. Linscott, working at The Eagle, won a Pulitzer Prize for Editorial Writing.

In 1991, Eagle reporter Holly A. Taylor won a George Polk Award for reporting about fiscal mismanagement at a Pittsfield hospital.

Recent awards from the New England Newspaper and Press Association have included:

- Newspaper of the Year, Sunday (2018, 2019, 2020, 2021, 2022, 2024)
- Newspaper of the Year, weekday (2018, 2020, 2023, 2025)
- Magazine of the Year for UpCountry (2017, 2019)
- Allan B. Rogers award for best New England editorial (2023, 2024 and 2025)
- Publick Occurrences Awards (two in 2017, two in 2018, one in 2020, one in 2021, one in 2022, two in 2023, two in 2026)
- General Excellence Awards — first place, 2018, 2019, 2021, 2023, 2024
- Best web site — 2022, 2024
- Yankee Quill Awards to "extraordinary journalists" — Lawrence K. Miller (1967), Abraham Michelson (1973), Kingsley R. Fall (1974)

In 2018, The Eagle received the Media Support of Arts Education Award from Arts|Learning, a Massachusetts arts education advocacy organization.

In 2019, The Eagle received the JFK Commonwealth Award from the Massachusetts Cultural Council, “for demonstrating the enduring civic value of community journalism.”

In 2022, Eagle publisher Fredric D. Rutberg received one of four annual Massachusetts Governor's Awards in the Humanities, for his leadership of the group that returned The Eagle to local ownership.

In 2023, Eagle editorial page editor David Coffey received the Carmage Walls Commentary Prize for newspapers under 35,000 in circulation, for editorials taking to task the Springfield (Massachusetts) Roman Catholic Diocese for demanding an Eagle reporter's notes for a series of stories about sexual abuse allegations against a powerful former bishop.

In 2025, Coffey again won the Carmage Walls prize, this time for editorials relating to raids by U.S. Immigrations and Customs Enforcement in Berkshire County.

== Notable people ==
- Mark Aldam, executive vice president and chief operating officer of Hearst Communications
- Hal Borland, columnist, naturalist and author, Eagle columnist 1958-1978
- James Brooke, journalist and editor at The New York Times, and Bloomberg; Eagle reporter 1977-1978
- Rinker Buck, journalist and author; Eagle reporter 1973–1975
- James MacGregor Burns, American historian and political scientist, contributed book reviews to The Eagle.
- Caleb Carr, military historian and author, worked as a freelance journalist for The Eagle covering Central America in the 1980s.
- Alan Cooperman, director of religion research at the Pew Research Center; previously a journalist for the Associated Press and the Washington Post, and a business reporter at The Eagle 1982-1988.
- Dalton Delan, writer, syndicated columnist, and television producer, writes a syndicated column, the Unspin Room, for The Eagle.
- Helen W. Donovan, executive editor at the Boston Globe, began career as an Eagle reporter
- Benjamin Ginsberg, lawyer who played a central role in the 2000 Florida recount; Eagle reporter for five years in the late 1970s
- Amy Hill Hearth, journalist and author of Having Our Say: The Delany Sisters' First 100 Years, worked as assistant arts and entertainment editor at The Eagle in the late 1970s.
- Roy Hoopes, journalist, author, and biographer, wrote a column for The Eagle 1957-1977 under the pseudonym Peter Potomac.
- Arthur Levitt, chairman of the U. S. Securities and Exchange Commission from 1993 to 2001, worked as a drama critic for The Eagle in the early 1950s.
- Roger Linscott, winner of the Pulitzer Prize for Editorial Writing in 1973, for his editorials during 1972.
- Seth Lipsky, journalist, editor of The Forward, founder of The New York Sun, worked as a reporter at The Eagle early in his career.
- Kelton B. Miller, owner and publisher 1892–1941.
- Gustav Niebuhr, Associate Professor of Religion at Syracuse University, worked as a reporter for The Eagle in the early 1980, and subsequently as a journalist for the New York Times, Washington Post, Wall Street Journal and Atlanta Journal-Constitution.
- Priscilla Painton, Time magazine deputy editor, executive editor at Simon & Schuster; was an Eagle reporter in the early 1980s.
- Daniel Pearl, American journalist for The Wall Street Journal who was kidnapped and later beheaded by terrorists in Pakistan in 2002; he began his career at the North Adams Transcript and The Eagle from 1986 to 1990.
- Stephen Rosenfeld, Washington Post editor and columnist for 40 years, Eagle reporter 1955–1957
- Caitlin Rother, journalist, author of Lost Girls; Eagle reporter in the late 1980s
- Andrew Pincus, classical music critic 1975-2022
- Kirk Scharfenberg, editorial page editor at the Boston Globe, creator of "Mush from the Wimp," Eagle reporter in the 1970s
- Cynthia Propper Seton, Eagle columnist for 12 years beginning in 1956 before becoming a novelist and essayist
- William L. Shirer, American journalist, war correspondent, and historian contributed book reviews.
- Holly A. Taylor, winner of the George Polk award for local reporting for 1991
- Craig Walker, American photojournalist who won Pulitzer Prizes for Feature Photography in 2010 and 2012, both while working for the Denver Post, was an Eagle staff photographer 1989-1998.
- Richard K. Weil, Jr., executive editor of the St. Louis Post-Dispatch, founder and chairman of the St. Louis Beacon was an Eagle reporter in the 1960s.
- Simon Winchester, author and journalist, is an occasional columnist for The Eagle.

== Cultural references ==
- In the 1981 film Absence of Malice starring Paul Newman and Sally Field, Field's character mentions that she once lived in the Northeast. "I had my first job there the summer when I was 16 on The Berkshire Eagle. I wonder if they'd have me back."
- Rinker Buck's book First Job: A Memoir of Growing Up at Work (2002) is a memoir of his employment at The Berkshire Eagle in the early 1970s, including recollections of many Eagle co-workers.
- Norman Rockwell included a copy of The Berkshire Eagle in his painting The Armchair General. Originally, when published as a cover of The Saturday Evening Post, the newspaper in the painting was the Troy Record, but Rockwell painted over the Record and inserted The Berkshire Eagle before presenting the original painting to the Miller family. It hung at the Eagle's offices for many years. The painting was exhibited in 2018–2020 as part of touring exhibit focused on Rockwell's Four Freedoms paintings.
- The original newspaper report describing the arrest of Arlo Guthrie for littering was published in The Berkshire Eagle on 29 November 1965. The incident led Guthrie to write the song and monologue "Alice's Restaurant", which launched his recording career, and included the line: "and everybody wanted to get in a newspaper story about it."

== Editorial page ==
The Eagle's editorial policy states: "The Eagle has taken certain key editorial positions consistently, and the editorial board will endorse changes to those positions only after deep discussion and research leading to consensus. These positions include a general predisposition toward free expression, as well as leaning toward progressive ideas, environmental conservation, the encouragement of innovation and entrepreneurship, and the promotion of tourism and cultural entities." The paper's editorials "focus most on local, regional and statewide concerns that then are articulated in the plurality (three of every five) of its editorials. As such, The Eagle's editorial voice and conscience is seen as the main convener and connector on issues of vital importance, including: civility in life and discourse, education – local and national; local economic development issues; environmental issues; and questions before local, state and national leaders and legislative bodies."

== Prices ==
As of 7 July 2026, single copies of The Berkshire Eagle cost $2.50 Tuesday through Friday, and $3.50 on Saturdays. Home delivery plus digital access costs $524 for 52 weeks. Digital-only access costs $179 per year.

== See also ==
- List of newspapers in Massachusetts
- List of newspapers in the United States
- Category:Pulitzer Prize–winning newspapers
