= WBEC-FM =

Radio station in Pittsfield, Massachusetts

- Pittsfield, Massachusetts; United States
- Broadcast area: Berkshire Mountains
- Frequency: 95.9 MHz (HD Radio)
- Branding: Live 95.9

Programming
- Format: Top 40 (CHR)
- Subchannels: HD2: Classic hits (simulcast of WUPE-FM); HD3: Talk/sports (simulcast of WBEC (AM))
- Affiliations: Compass Media Networks; United Stations Radio Networks

Ownership
- Owner: Townsquare Media; (Townsquare License, LLC)
- Sister stations: WBEC; WNAW; WSBS; WUPE-FM

History
- First air date: 1975
- Former call signs: WGRG-FM (1975–77); WUPE-FM (1977–79); WUPE (1979–2006); WUPE-FM (April 7–14, 2006); WMNB (April 14–May 2, 2006)
- Call sign meaning: taken from sister station WBEC (AM), originally owned by the Berkshire Eagle Company

Technical information
- Licensing authority: FCC
- Facility ID: 71437
- Class: A
- ERP: 1,000 watts
- HAAT: 170 meters (560 ft)
- Transmitter coordinates: 42.412°N 73.284°W
- Translator: HD2: 103.3 W277CJ (Pittsfield)

Links
- Public license information: Public file; LMS
- Webcast: Listen live
- Website: live959.com

WBEC-FM (95.9 MHz) is a commercial radio station in Pittsfield, Massachusetts. It is owned by Townsquare Media and broadcasts a Top 40 (CHR) format.

WBEC-FM has an effective radiated power (ERP) of 1,000 watts. The transmitter is off Alpine Trail in Pittsfield, near South Street (U.S. Route 20).

== History ==
In 1975, the station signed on as WGRG-FM, airing a free form progressive rock sound. At that time, it was not associated with WBEC (1420 AM). WBEC had an FM station on 94.3 MHz dating back to the late 1940s, but gave it up in an era when few people owned FM receivers. It later put another FM station on the air on 105.5 MHz; that station moved to Easthampton, Massachusetts, becoming WVEI-FM, in 2006.

From 1977 to 2006, the station was known as WUPE-FM. WUPE began operations in 1977 simulcasting the top 40 sound heard on WUPE (1110 AM). WUPE-AM-FM later switched to soft adult contemporary and then oldies. After oldies, the WUPE-FM call sign and format were moved to 100.1 FM.

In August 2013, Gamma Broadcasting reached a deal to sell its Berkshire County radio stations, including WBEC-FM, to Reed Miami Holdings. The sale was canceled on December 30, 2013. In October 2016, Gamma agreed to sell its stations to Galaxy Communications. That sale also fell through, and in 2017 the stations were acquired by Townsquare Media.

== HD Radio ==
In March 2025, WBEC-FM added a second HD Radio channel to simulcast WUPE-FM; the subchannel is in turn relayed on translator station W277CJ (103.3 FM). The subchannel serves as a replacement for WUPE (1110 AM), which surrendered its license on March 25 and had previously served as W277CJ's primary station.

Broadcast translator for WBEC-FM HD2
Call sign	Frequency	City of license	FID	ERP (W)	Class	Transmitter coordinates	FCC info
W277CJ	103.3 FM	Pittsfield, Massachusetts	145171	100	D	42°26′52.2″N 73°15′17.7″W	LMS
