= Mount Lincoln (Massachusetts) =

Mountain in Massachusetts, United States

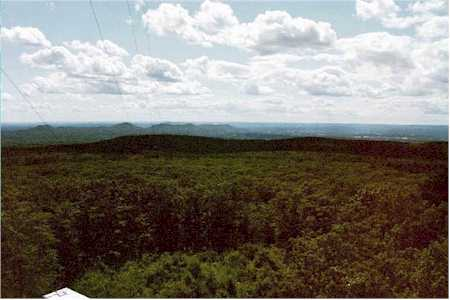
- View from Mount Lincoln firetower

Highest point
- Elevation: 1,240 ft (380 m)
- Coordinates: 42°21′50″N 72°25′23″W

Geography
- Location: Pelham, Massachusetts
- Parent range: Pellham Hills

Geology
- Rock age: 400 million years
- Mountain type(s): Metamorphic rock; dissected plateau

Climbing
- Easiest route: Metacomet-Monadnock Trail

Mount Lincoln, 1,240 feet (380 m), is a high point on the Pelham Dome or Pelham Hills, an upland plateau overlooking the Connecticut River Valley in Pelham, Massachusetts (near Amherst, Massachusetts). The mountain is mostly wooded, but a fire tower located on the summit provides views of the Holyoke Range and the east-central Pioneer Valley. The summit, located within the University of Massachusetts Amherst's 1,200-acre (490 ha) Cadwell Memorial Forest, is traversed by the Metacomet-Monadnock Trail and is the home of the Five Colleges radio station beacon.

The west side of Mount Lincoln drains into Hop Brook and Amethyst Brook, thence into Fort River, the Connecticut River, and Long Island Sound. The east side drains into Jabish Brook, following its course into Belchertown, Massachusetts, where the watershed splits into the Jabish Canal and Jabish Brook. The Jabish Canal flows into Broad Brook, thence into the Chicopee River, the Connecticut River, and Long Island Sound; Jabish Brook flows into the Swift River, the Ware River, thence the Chicopee River, Connecticut River, and Long Island Sound.

== Cadwell Memorial Forest ==
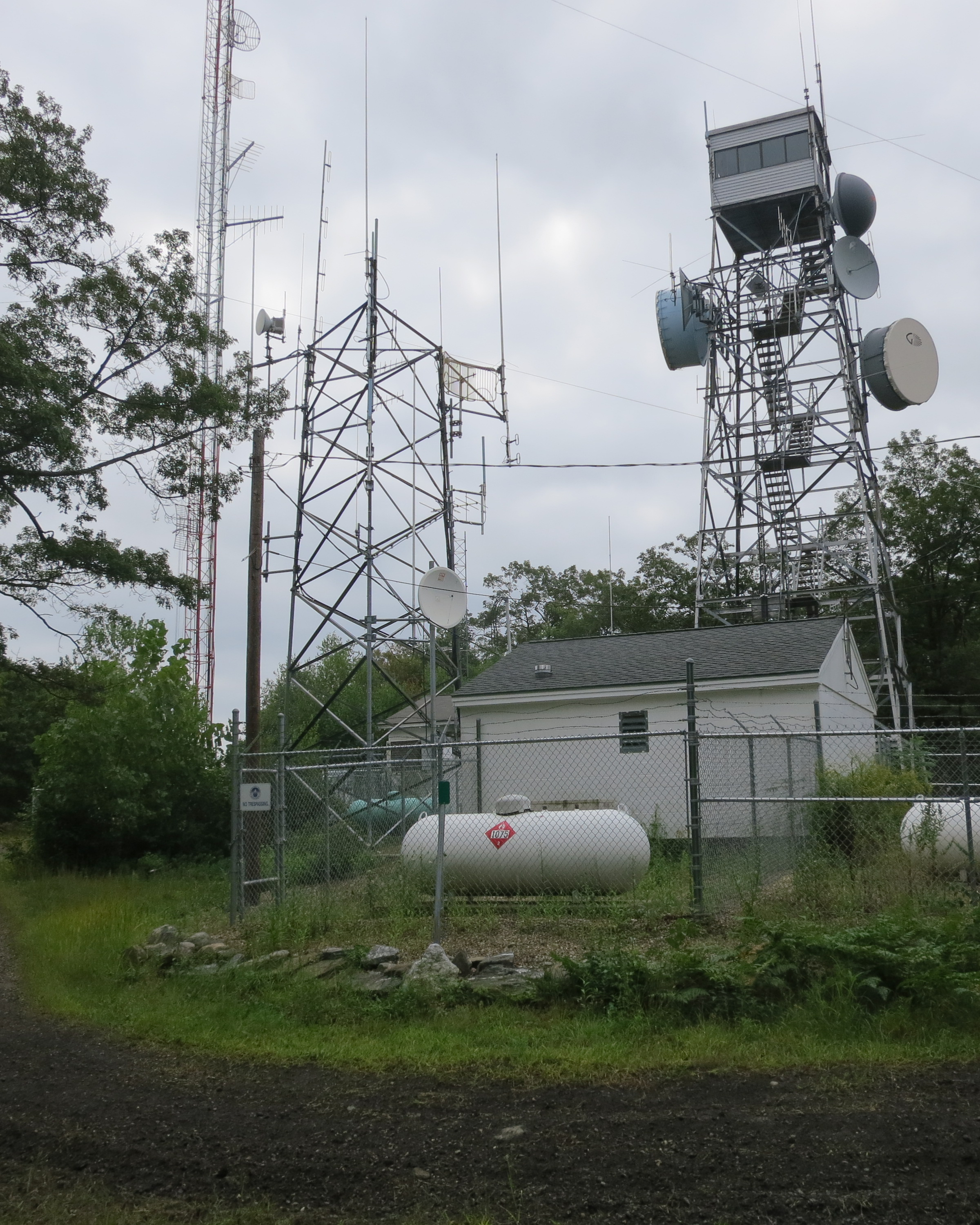
Amongst this jumble of electronic transmitters, the original 80 foot fire tower remains in seasonal use.

The forest is named after Frank A. Cadwell (1860–1935), a successful local businessman orphaned at age sixteen following a logging accident that killed his father. Cadwell began his business career as an apprentice at the Amherst Ice Company and quickly rose to prominence as a land speculator and banker. Cadwell's widow donated the land to the University of Massachusetts Department of Forestry in 1952 to divest herself of having to pay taxes on the property. The University currently uses the forest to conduct silviculture and ecosystem research.

== Recreation ==
The Metacomet-Monadnock Trail traverses over the summit of Mt. Lincoln. Because this section, #11, of the M&M Trail is not entirely on public land, re-routing of the trail because of private ownership issues remains a concern. The Metacomet-Monadnock Trail is one leg of the larger New England Trail.
