= WAIC (FM) =

Satellite of WNNZ, Westfield
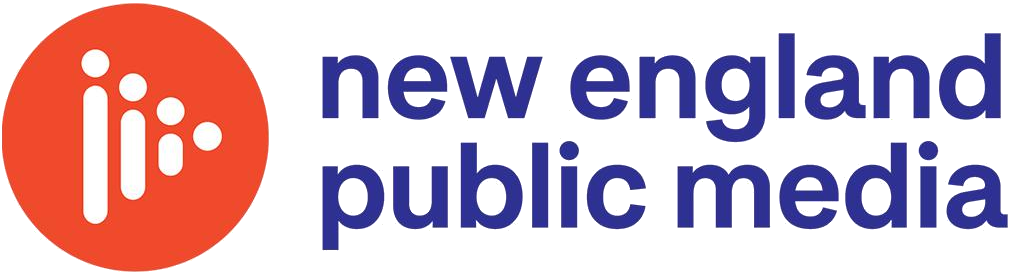
- Springfield, Massachusetts; United States
- Broadcast area: Southern Pioneer Valley
- Frequency: 91.9 MHz
- Branding: New England Public Radio; NEPR News Network

Programming
- Format: Public radio
- Affiliations: New England Public Media; NPR; Public Radio Exchange; American Public Media

Ownership
- Owner: American International College
- Operator: Five College Consortium

History
- First air date: February 1967
- Call sign meaning: American International College

Technical information
- Licensing authority: FCC
- Facility ID: 1749
- Class: A
- ERP: 230 watts
- HAAT: 20 meters (66 ft)
- Transmitter coordinates: 42°6′44″N 72°33′29″W

Links
- Public license information: Public file; LMS
- Website: www.nepm.org

WAIC (91.9 FM) is the college radio station of American International College in Springfield, Massachusetts. It is operated by the Five College Consortium's National Public Radio member station, WFCR, and serves as a relay of the all-news format airing on WFCR's sister station, WNNZ.

== History ==
WAIC first went on air in February 1967, going stereo in 1985. Initially programmed from American International College. In the 1970s WAIC was a local favorite alternative to Top 40 programming, well known for disco, funk, and progressive rock. With AIC changing its focus to being a commuter college, it decided to stop programming the station directly and contracted with Connecticut Public Radio to carry their programming as of November 1, 2011. On July 1, 2016, it began relaying WNNZ.

== See also ==
- WFCR
