= WBRK (AM) =

- Pittsfield, Massachusetts; United States
- Broadcast area: Berkshire Mountains
- Frequency: 1340 kHz
- Branding: The Peak, K97.1

Programming
- Format: Classic hits

Ownership
- Owner: WBRK, Inc.
- Sister stations: WBRK-FM

History
- First air date: February 20, 1938
- Call sign meaning: Berkshire

Technical information
- Licensing authority: FCC
- Facility ID: 71232
- Class: C
- Power: 1,000 watts
- Transmitter coordinates: 42°27′0.31″N 73°12′53.38″W
- Translators: 97.1 W246DM (Pittsfield); 93.9 W230CP (Pittsfield)

Links
- Public license information: Public file; LMS
- Webcast: Listen live
- Website: wbrk.com

WBRK (1340 AM) is a radio station licensed to serve Pittsfield, Massachusetts. The radio station is owned by WBRK, Inc. It airs a classic hits radio format. The station was assigned the callsign WBRK by the Federal Communications Commission.

WBRK transmits 1,000 watts non-directional. Programming is also heard on FM translators W246DM on 97.1 MHz and W230CP on 93.9 MHz.

== History ==
WBRK was the Berkshires' first radio station, signing on the air on February 20, 1938. It used radio studios located on "Bank Row" in downtown Pittsfield. As with many stations of that era, the spacious studios allowed for live performances by the big bands and orchestras of the day. It was also an affiliate of the CBS Radio Network, airing its dramas, comedies, news, sports, soap operas, game shows and big band broadcasts during the "Golden Age of Radio".

On February 5, 1954, the company founded the only commercial television station to call the Berkshires home, with WMGT Channel 19. The television station, with a tower on Mount Greylock, was later sold and eventually evolved into WCDC-TV, a satellite station of WTEN in Albany, New York. It was shut down in 2017.

WBRK had a middle of the road format for much of the 1950s, 1960s, 1970s, and 1980s. It transitioned to talk radio in the 1990s formerly carried New York Yankees games, as well as local sports broadcasts. It also airs some CBS Sports Radio programming, including Jim Rome and Doug Gottlieb.

From 1941 to 1960, Dan Healy worked as a sports broadcaster for WBRK.

== Translators ==
Call sign	Frequency	City of license	FID	ERP (W)	Class	Transmitter coordinates	FCC info
W246DM	97.1 FM	Pittsfield, Massachusetts	201507	250	D	42°28′31.3″N 73°16′5.4″W	LMS
W230CP	93.9 FM	Pittsfield, Massachusetts	153531	1	D	42°26′58.3″N 73°15′9.3″W	LMS
