= WDIS =

- Norfolk, Massachusetts; United States
- Broadcast area: Greater Boston
- Frequency: 1170 kHz

Ownership
- Owner: Albert E. Grady, Esq.; (Discussion Radio, Incorporated)

History
- First air date: March 7, 1978
- Last air date: June 13, 2014
- Former call signs: WJMQ (1978–1982); WJCC (1982–1993)
- Call sign meaning: "Discussion"

Technical information
- Facility ID: 16977
- Class: D
- Power: 1,000 watts (day)
- Transmitter coordinates: 42°5′32.4″N 71°18′11.2″W

WDIS (1170 AM) was a radio station licensed to Norfolk, Massachusetts. It served the suburban communities south of Boston and north of Providence, Rhode Island. It had a daytime-only 1,000-watt signal that reached as far west as Worcester, Massachusetts, giving it a coverage area of almost a half-million people. As of June 13, 2014, WDIS was silent. The FCC cancelled the license and deleted the call sign for WDIS on October 13, 2015.

== History ==
WDIS began as a construction permit applied for on January 16, 1976, as a 500-watt station by John M. Quinlan, a former Massachusetts state legislator. Quinlan obtained a license from the Federal Communications Commission (FCC) to broadcast on 1170 kHz with the call sign WJMQ on March 7, 1978. The studio was located on Pond Street (Route 115) near Norfolk center. WJMQ applied for an increase in power to 1 kW on June 7, 1978. The power increase was completed and a license to cover was applied for on January 19, 1979. That license was granted on July 30, 1979.

Quinlan's company, Norfolk County Broadcasting, sold WJMQ to Caroline Broadcasting for $425,000 in 1982; principal John F. Crohan already owned WPEP in Taunton. On October 27, 1982, the station changed its call sign to WJCC. In September 1991, the news/talk station went silent; the Internal Revenue Service had seized its equipment due to tax delinquencies, and the license was transferred to another Crohan-controlled company to satisfy a $25,000 debt. The following year, WJCC was sold to Albert E. Grady's Discussion Radio, Inc., for $65,000. The station returned to the air, again with a talk format, in December 1992; on February 3, 1993, WJCC became WDIS.

WDIS spent much of March 1996 silent after not paying a $2,000 power bill. It shifted from talk to an adult contemporary format in 1997. In 1999, the station briefly lost its license for not renewing its license before its expiration on April 1, 1998; its subsequent renewal application was opposed by Astro Broadcasting, which was seeking a power increase for its WJJF (1180 AM) in Hope Valley, Rhode Island. In 2004, the FCC fined WDIS $16,500, with $10,000 being for a public file violation unrelated to the renewal; the fine was reduced to $1,200 in 2009. The station was again silent for a period starting in July 2002; by that point, the station featured a mixture of talk and adult contemporary music. In later years, WDIS was affiliated with the Business Talk Radio Network, Fox News Radio and Westwood One.

In 2007, WDIS aired Tri-County Cougar home football games at the Tri-County Regional Vocational Technical High School in Franklin, Massachusetts. In 2008, they resumed broadcasting Walpole High School Rebels football team live on the internet as well as over the air (daytime games live, night games on tape given the station's daytime-only status). Beginning in December 2008, WDIS had also broadcast all King Philip High School Boys Basketball games, as that basketball program tried to rebound after two consecutive no-win seasons.

According to FCC filings, WDIS notified the FCC it was silent as of June 13, 2014, confirmed by the station on Twitter on June 25 and 29. On August 5, 2015, a letter was sent by the FCC to WDIS's owner, Albert Grady seeking an update of the operational status of the station within 30 days, or the license would be automatically terminated for violation of section 312(g) of the Communications Act (failure to broadcast for 12 consecutive months). The FCC received a response on September 8, 2015, from William J. McGrath stating that the station's studio and transmitter building had been condemned as unsafe by the town of Norfolk after an inspection on June 2, 2014.

On October 13, 2015, the FCC issued its decision to cancel WDIS's license, stating that the station had been off the air for over 12 months and Section 312(g) of the Communications Act required the license to be deleted as a matter of law.
