= North Adams Transcript =

Newspaper in North Adams, Massachusetts

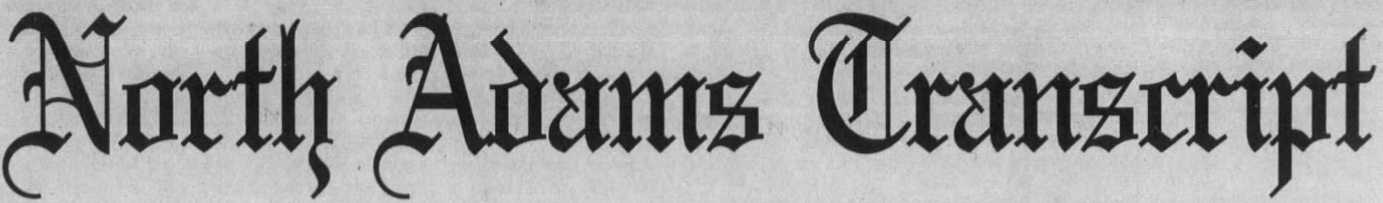
- Type: Daily newspaper
- Format: Broadsheet
- Owner: New England Newspapers Inc.
- Editor: Unfilled
- Founded: September 7, 1843, as The Weekly Transcript
- Ceased publication: January 2014
- Headquarters: 85 Main Street, Suite 2, North Adams, Massachusetts 01247, United States
- Circulation: 4,808 weekdays 5,619 Saturdays in 2012
- OCLC number: 22536703
- Website: thetranscript.com

The North Adams Transcript, prior to being merged into The Berkshire Eagle in 2014, was an American daily newspaper published Mondays through Saturdays in North Adams, Massachusetts. It was one of four Massachusetts newspapers owned by MediaNews Group of Colorado. Under the ownership of MediaNews Group and later Digital First Media, it was part of the New England Newspapers group. The group also included the Berkshire Eagle and Advocate Weekly, as well as three Vermont newspapers — the Bennington Banner, Brattleboro Reformer and Manchester Journal. The Advocate Weekly was shut down in January 2014.

Branded as "The Voice of the Northern Berkshires Since 1843," the Transcript covered North Adams and Adams, Cheshire, Clarksburg, Florida, Hancock, Lanesborough, New Ashford, and Williamstown, Massachusetts; and Pownal and Stamford, Vermont.

== History ==
In 1896, the Transcript was bought by the Hardman family; 80 years later, co-publishers (and brothers) James Jr. and Robert Hardman sold it to The Boston Globe, which turned it over to Ingersoll Publications Inc. in 1979. Then, in 1989, Ingersoll sold the paper to the American Publishing Company (later Hollinger International).

The Transcript in 1975 was named the best small daily newspaper in New England.

MediaNews Group, through its subsidiary Garden State Newspapers, acquired the paper from Hollinger in 1996 as part of a 10-newspaper trade involving properties from four other states. The purchase allowed MediaNews to deepen its ties to Western Massachusetts, where it had already bought The Berkshire Eagle the year before.

Journalist Daniel Pearl got his start at the Transcript in the late 1980s before going to The Wall Street Journal in 1990.

The Transcript was absorbed into the Berkshire Eagle in January 2014.
