= WSBS (AM) =

- Great Barrington, Massachusetts; United States
- Broadcast area: The Berkshires
- Frequency: 860 kHz
- Branding: 860 AM/94.1 FM WSBS

Programming
- Format: Full-service radio; classic hits
- Affiliations: ABC News Radio; Boston Red Sox Radio Network

Ownership
- Owner: Townsquare Media; (Townsquare License, LLC)
- Sister stations: WBEC; WBEC-FM; WNAW; WUPE-FM

History
- First air date: 1949
- Former call signs: WNAW (1949–1956)
- Call sign meaning: Southern Berkshire Station

Technical information
- Licensing authority: FCC
- Facility ID: 4820
- Class: D
- Power: 2,700 watts day; 250 watts critical hours; 4 watts night
- Transmitter coordinates: 42°12′53.32″N 73°20′41.4″W
- Translator: 94.1 W231AK (Great Barrington)

Links
- Public license information: Public file; LMS
- Webcast: Listen live
- Website: wsbs.com

WSBS (860 kHz) is a commercial AM radio station in Great Barrington, Massachusetts. It is owned by Townsquare Media and has a full-service classic hits radio format, mixed with local news, talk and sports. World and national news is supplied by ABC News Radio. WSBS is an affiliate of the Boston Red Sox Radio Network.

By day, WSBS transmits with 2,700 watts, but because 860 AM is a clear channel frequency reserved for Class A CJBC Toronto, WSBS must reduce power at night to four watts to avoid interference. It uses a directional antenna at all times.

== History ==
The station was first licensed in 1949 as WNAW in North Adams, Massachusetts. In 1956, it moved to Great Barrington as WSBS; this incarnation first signed on December 24, 1956. For most of its history, WSBS was a daytimer, required to go off the air at sunset. In the late '80s, it was authorized to broadcast at 3.9 watts during non-daylight hours. Through the 1950s, 1960s, 1970s and 1980s, WSBS broadcast a middle of the road format, with local news and sports prominent on its schedule. By the 1990s, the music had moved to an adult contemporary playlist.

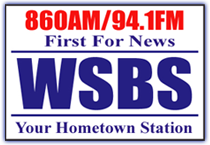
Previous logo

In August 2013, Gamma Broadcasting reached a deal to sell its Berkshire County radio stations, including WSBS, to Reed Miami Holdings; the sale was canceled on December 30, 2013. In October 2016, Gamma agreed to sell its stations to Galaxy Communications; that sale also fell through, and in 2017, the stations were acquired by Townsquare Media.

== Technical information ==
WSBS transmits 2,700 watts daytime with a Marconi 1959 series-fed 1/4-wave tower. The primary transmitter is a Harris SX2.5, and a backup Gates 250GY. The nighttime transmitter is an LPB.

=== Translator ===
Call sign	Frequency	City of license	FID	ERP (W)	HAAT	Class	Transmitter coordinates	FCC info
W231AK	94.1 FM	Great Barrington, Massachusetts	87061	250	−71.8 m (−236 ft)	D	42°12′53.3″N 73°20′41.4″W	LMS
