= WBRK-FM =

- Pittsfield, Massachusetts; United States
- Broadcast area: Berkshire Mountains
- Frequency: 101.7 MHz
- Branding: Star 101.7

Programming
- Format: Hot adult contemporary
- Affiliations: Westwood One

Ownership
- Owner: WBRK, Inc.
- Sister stations: WBRK (AM)

History
- First air date: October 10, 1970
- Former call signs: WBRK-FM (1970–1981); WKTQ (1981–1984); WRCZ (1984–1996)
- Call sign meaning: Berkshire

Technical information
- Licensing authority: FCC
- Facility ID: 71231
- Class: A
- ERP: 3,000 watts
- HAAT: 44 meters (144 ft)
- Transmitter coordinates: 42°28′31.3″N 73°16′5.4″W

Links
- Public license information: Public file; LMS
- Webcast: Listen live
- Website: wbrk.com

WBRK-FM (101.7 MHz, "Star 101.7") is a commercial FM radio station in Pittsfield, Massachusetts. It is owned by WBRK, Inc. and broadcasts a hot adult contemporary radio format.

== History ==
The station signed on the air as WBRK-FM on October 10, 1970. On October 26, 1981, the station changed its call sign to WKTQ. On July 30, 1984, the station became WRCZ. The WBRK-FM call sign returned on August 2, 1996.
