= WUPE-FM =

Classic hits radio station in North Adams–Pittsfield, Massachusetts

- North Adams, Massachusetts; United States
- Broadcast area: Berkshire County, Massachusetts; Bennington County, Vermont
- Frequency: 100.1 MHz
- Branding: Whoopee

Programming
- Format: Classic hits

Ownership
- Owner: Townsquare Media; (Townsquare License, LLC)
- Sister stations: WBEC; WBEC-FM; WNAW; WSBS

History
- First air date: July 12, 1964
- Former call signs: WMNB-FM (1964–1988); WMNB (1988–2006)
- Call sign meaning: Whoopie

Technical information
- Licensing authority: FCC
- Facility ID: 4821
- Class: A
- ERP: 1,150 watts
- HAAT: 158.8 meters (521 ft)
- Transmitter coordinates: 42°41′54.2″N 73°3′52.3″W
- Repeater: 95.9 WBEC-FM HD2 (Pittsfield)

Links
- Public license information: Public file; LMS
- Webcast: Listen live
- Website: wupe.com

WUPE-FM (100.1 FM) is a classic hits radio station owned by Townsquare Media. Licensed to North Adams, Massachusetts, United States, WUPE-FM serves Pittsfield.

== History ==
The station went on the air July 12, 1964, as WMNB-FM, owned by the Hardman family along with WMNB (1230 AM) and the North Adams Transcript. The Hardmans sold Northern Berkshire Broadcasting to Donald A. Thurston in April 1966; the company became Berkshire Broadcasting after the purchase of WSBS in Great Barrington in 1968. By 1973, WMNB-FM had a beautiful music format, separately-programmed from the AM station (though even at WMNB-FM's inception the two stations did not duplicate more than thirty percent of their programming). The callsign was modified to simply WMNB on January 30, 1988, after the AM station was renamed WNAW. During the mid-1990s, WMNB's format incorporated smooth jazz and soft adult contemporary programming; as a whole, however, it remained one of the few remaining beautiful music stations.

Vox Communications purchased Berkshire Broadcasting in November 2003, with the sale closing in May 2004. The next month, WMNB began simulcasting an oldies genre with another Vox station, WUPE (95.9). The station took the WUPE-FM callsign two years later, as part of a larger shuffle resulting in WBEC-FM moving from 105.5 (now WWEI) to 95.9. WUPE-FM's programming also began to be heard on an AM station in Pittsfield on 1110 AM. Vox transferred most of its stations to Gamma Broadcasting in late 2012. In August 2013, Gamma reached a deal to sell its Berkshire County radio stations, including WUPE-FM, to Reed Miami Holdings; the sale was canceled on December 30, 2013.

WUPE-FM's tower, along with an adjacent cell tower, collapsed on March 29, 2014, as a result of high winds, forcing the station off the air. The station stated that it would resume broadcasting with a temporary antenna by April 1. WUPE's simulcast on 1110 AM in Pittsfield and its web stream were not affected by the tower collapse.

In October 2016, Gamma Broadcasting agreed to sell its stations to Galaxy Communications; the sale fell through, and in 2017 the stations were acquired by Townsquare Media.

In March 2025, Townsquare moved WUPE-FM's Pittsfield simulcast from 1110 AM, which went off the air and surrendered its license, to the second HD Radio channel of WBEC-FM. WBEC-FM HD2, as had WUPE AM in its final years, serves as the primary station for translator station W277CJ (103.3 FM) in Pittsfield.

== See also ==
- WUPE (AM)
