= WBEC (AM) =

- Pittsfield, Massachusetts; United States
- Broadcast area: Berkshire Mountains
- Frequency: 1420 kHz
- Branding: AM 1420 WBEC

Programming
- Format: Talk and sports radio
- Affiliations: ABC News Radio; Fox Sports Radio; Compass Media Networks; Westwood One; Boston Red Sox Radio Network; New England Patriots Radio Network

Ownership
- Owner: Townsquare Media; (Townsquare License, LLC)
- Sister stations: WBEC-FM; WNAW; WUPE-FM; WSBS

History
- First air date: March 1947
- Call sign meaning: Berkshire Eagle Company (original owner)

Technical information
- Licensing authority: FCC
- Facility ID: 2714
- Class: B
- Power: 1,000 watts
- Transmitter coordinates: 42°26′40.3″N 73°16′41.38″W
- Repeater: 95.9 WBEC-FM HD3 (Pittsfield)

Links
- Public license information: Public file; LMS
- Website: 1420wbec.com

WBEC (1420 kHz) is a commercial AM radio station broadcasting a talk and sports radio format. It is licensed to Pittsfield, Massachusetts, and is owned by Townsquare Media.

WBEC is powered at 1,000 watts. By day, it uses a non-directional antenna. At night, to protect other stations on 1420 AM, it uses a directional antenna with a two-tower array.

== Programming ==
Most of WBEC's schedule is made up of nationally syndicated shows. Weekdays begin with two news magazines, First Light with Michael Toscano and This Morning, America's First News with Gordon Deal. Afternoons feature progressive talk host Thom Hartmann and family finance expert Dave Ramsey. Fox Sports Radio is heard evenings and overnights.

Weekends include shows on money, health, home repair and gardening, as well as repeats of weekday shows and Fox Sports. Most talk hours begin with world and national news from ABC News Radio.

== History ==
In March 1947, WBEC first signed on the air. It was owned by The Berkshire Eagle daily newspaper, which is reflected in the station's call sign, Berkshire Eagle Company. It was an affiliate of the NBC Blue Network, which later became ABC Radio. The station added an FM counterpart in 1948, WBEC-FM at 94.3 MHz, but gave up the license when few people had FM receivers. In 1967, WBEC-FM returned at 105.5 MHz. In the 1960s, WBEC-AM-FM simulcast a Top 40 music format, along with news and sports.

WBEC-AM-FM were sold to Richard S. Jackson, who held on to them until the early 1980s, when he sold them to Bob Howard Communications. Howard, according to iBerkshires.com, was a former NBC TV President, “who kept the stations until they were sold in bankruptcy.” The new owner was Joe Gallagher Associates. Gallagher later sold WBEC-AM-FM to Telemedia Corporation, whose parent company was sold to Vox Media in August 1999.

WBEC has a rich history of broadcasting in Berkshire County, which has included, at various times, top 40 music (currently the format on WBEC-FM), local news, sports, and original programs such as Sound Off 1420, a morning talk show that was popular in the 1970s and early 1980s. Early adopters of the Marti Electronics Remote Pickup Unit (RPU), WBEC had the ability to offer live local high school sports and remote broadcasts during special events.

Well known on-air personalities who have been on WBEC's airwaves include Bob Cudmore, Bill Watson, Rick Bletaire and Larry Kratka. In the 1990s, as music listening switched to FM radio, WBEC eliminated its music programming and went with an all-talk format.

Previous logo

On March 5, 2012, WBEC announced it would no longer carry The Rush Limbaugh Show in response to Limbaugh's derogatory remarks about law student Sandra Fluke. General manager Peter Barry told local NPR member station WFCR that he and his staff had been troubled by Limbaugh's rhetoric for many years, but his attacks on Fluke were the last straw. WBEC is believed to be the second of Limbaugh's affiliates to cancel his show; KPUA in Hilo, Hawaii, had dropped Limbaugh a few hours earlier. WBEC replaced Limbaugh with The Mike Huckabee Show upon that show's launch on April 9 of the same year. The station began to run The Howie Carr Show on January 5, 2015.

In August 2013, Gamma Broadcasting reached a deal to sell its Berkshire County radio stations, including WBEC, to Reed Miami Holdings. But the sale was canceled on December 30, 2013. In October 2016, Gamma agreed to sell its stations to Galaxy Communications. That sale also fell through, and in 2017 the stations were acquired by Townsquare Media.
