= 1540 AM =

AM radio frequency

The following radio stations broadcast on AM frequency 1540 kHz: 1540 AM is a United States clear-channel frequency. KXEL Waterloo, Iowa, and ZNS-1 Nassau, Bahamas, share Class A status on 1540 AM.

== Argentina ==
- LU 28 in General Madariaga, Buenos Aires
- LT 35 in Pergamino, Buenos Aires
- Lider in Martinez, Buenos Aires

== Bahamas ==
Stations in bold are clear-channel stations.

- **ZNS-1** in Nassau, Bahamas - 50 kW, transmitter located at 25.003917°N 77.350333°W

== Canada ==
- CHIN in Toronto, Ontario - 50 kW daytime, 30 kW nighttime, transmitter located at 43.615278°N 79.380556°W

== Mexico ==
- XESTN-AM in Monterrey, Nuevo León

== United States ==
Stations in bold are clear-channel stations.

Call sign	City of license	Facility ID	Class	Daytime power (kW)	Nighttime power (kW)	Critical hours power (kW)	Unlimited power (kW)	Transmitter coordinates
KAMM	University Park, Texas	63551	B	32	0.75			32.8125°N 97.008333°W
KBOA	Kennett, Missouri	33674	D	1	0.003	0.53		36.225°N 90.075°W
KEDA	San Antonio, Texas	14892	B	5	1			29.358333°N 98.351389°W
KENT	Enterprise, Nevada	160781	B	10	0.27	3.7		36.011111°N 115.241111°W
KGBC	Galveston, Texas	26002	B	3.6	0.185	2.6		29.315278°N 94.805278°W
KLKC	Parsons, Kansas	12832	D	0.25	0.001			37.343056°N 95.231944°W
KLYR	Ozark, Arkansas	51097	D	0.5	0.001			35.487778°N 93.811944°W
KMCP	McPherson, Kansas	15840	D	0.25	0.002			38.338611°N 97.668056°W
KMPC	Los Angeles, California	61647	B	50	37			34.078611°N 118.184722°W
KTGG	Okemos, Michigan	61993	D	0.4		0.219		42.720278°N 84.519722°W
**KXEL**	Waterloo, Iowa	35950	A	50	50			42.179722°N 92.310556°W (daytime); 42.18°N 92.310556°W (nighttime)
KXPA	Bellevue, Washington	11752	B	5	5			47.591389°N 122.182222°W
WADK	Newport, Rhode Island	48744	D	1				41.503611°N 71.311944°W
WBCO	Bucyrus, Ohio	7111	D	0.5				40.764167°N 82.934722°W
WBNL	Boonville, Indiana	6425	D	0.25	0.001			38.066111°N 87.274167°W
WBRY	Woodbury, Tennessee	15530	D	0.5				35.831389°N 86.111667°W
WBTC	Uhrichsville, Ohio	68425	D	0.25	0.005			40.423889°N 81.363056°W
WDON	Wheaton, Maryland	38439	D	5		1		39.013889°N 77.029444°W
WECZ	Punxsutawney, Pennsylvania	55710	D	5		1		40.96°N 79.002222°W
WFNO	Gretna, Louisiana	14538	D	1				29.8875°N 90.084167°W
WIBS	Guayama, Puerto Rico	72384	D	1				17.995556°N 66.0775°W
WJJT	Jellico, Tennessee	68132	D	1	0.001	0.5		36.583056°N 84.136111°W
WKVQ	Eatonton, Georgia	16668	D	10		1.6		33.321944°N 83.4175°W
WLOI	La Porte, Indiana	36542	D	0.25				41.633611°N 86.759167°W
WMYJ	Martinsville, Indiana	57356	D	0.5		0.25		39.408611°N 86.419444°W
WNWR	Philadelphia, Pennsylvania	1027	D	10	0.007	2.1		40.046111°N 75.235833°W
WOGR	Charlotte, North Carolina	70092	D	2.4				35.273889°N 80.861111°W
WPKC	Exeter, New Hampshire	53386	D	5				42.989722°N 70.937222°W
WPTT	Hartford, Wisconsin	34302	D	0.5				43.28°N 88.383889°W
WSMI	Litchfield, Illinois	64565	D	1				39.1725°N 89.570556°W
WTXY	Whiteville, North Carolina	62232	D	1				34.323056°N 78.713056°W
WULT	Sandston, Virginia	21434	D	1	0.008			37.544167°N 77.346389°W
WVOA	East Syracuse, New York	22133	D	1	0.057			43.094444°N 76.033333°W (daytime); 43.022778°N 76.159444°W (nighttime)
WYNC	Yanceyville, North Carolina	59673	D	2.5		1		36.414444°N 79.335°W
WYOH	Niles, Ohio	73308	D	0.5				41.132222°N 80.761111°W
