= WMYJ =

WMYJ may refer to:

- WMYJ (AM), a radio station (1540 AM) licensed to serve Martinsville, Indiana, United States
- WMYJ-FM, a radio station (88.9 FM) licensed to serve Oolitic, Indiana
- WDCK (FM), a radio station (101.1 FM) licensed to serve Bloomfield, Indiana, which held the call sign WMYJ-FM from 2013 to 2016
