= KLYR =

KLYR may refer to:

- KLYR (AM), a radio station (1540 AM) licensed to serve Ozark, Arkansas, United States
- KGMR, a radio station (1360 AM) licensed to serve Clarksville, Arkansas, which held the call sign KLYR from 1956 to 2023
- KDYN-FM, a radio station (92.7 FM) licensed to serve Clarksville, which held the call sign KLYR-FM until 2013

== See also ==
- Kilolight-year, abbreviated klyr
