= WOGR =

WOGR may refer to:

- WOGR (AM), a radio station (1540 AM) licensed to Charlotte, North Carolina, United States
- WOGR-FM, a radio station (93.3 FM) licensed to Salisbury, North Carolina, United States
