= ZNS =

ZNS or ZnS may refer to:

- ZNS is part of the Zambian Defence Force.
- Zentralmagazin Naturwissenschaftlicher Sammlungen Halle, the natural history collection of Martin Luther University Halle-Wittenberg
- Zinc sulfide or zinc sulphide (ZnS), a chemical compound
- Zoned Namespace, a feature of NVMe
- ZNS-TV, a national radio and TV broadcaster operated by the state-owned Broadcasting Corporation of The Bahamas
  - ZNS-1, the oldest broadcast station in the Bahamas
