= WXEX =

WXEX may refer to:

- WPKC (AM), a radio station (1540 AM) licensed to Exeter, New Hampshire, United States, which held the call sign WXEX from 2009 to 2023
- WPKC-FM, a radio station (92.1 FM) licensed to Sanford, Maine, United States, which held the call sign WXEX-FM from 2011 to 2023
- WEAN-FM, a radio station (99.7 FM) licensed to Wakefield-Peacedale, Rhode Island, United States, which held the call sign WXEX from 1997 to 1999
- WRIC-TV, a television station (channel 22) licensed to Petersburg, Virginia, United States, which held the call sign WXEX-TV from 1955 to 1990
