= WDCK =

WDCK may refer to:

- WDCK (FM), a radio station (101.1 FM) licensed to serve Bloomfield, Indiana, United States
- WMYJ-FM, a radio station (88.9 FM) licensed to serve Oolitic, Indiana, which held the call sign WDCK from 2013 to 2016
