= WPHX =

WPHX can refer to:

- WPHX-LP, a low-power radio station (101.9 FM) licensed to Ruskin, Florida, United States
- WWSF, a radio station (1220 AM) licensed to Sanford, Maine, which held the call sign WPHX from 1999 to 2012
- WPKC-FM, a radio station (92.1 FM) licensed to Sanford, Maine, which held the call sign WPHX-FM from 1999 to 2011
