= KDYN =

KDYN may refer to:

- KDYN-FM, a radio station (92.7 FM) licensed to serve Clarksville, Arkansas, United States
- KLYR (AM), a radio station (1540 AM) licensed to serve Ozark, Arkansas, which held the call sign KDYN from 1985 to 2023
- KXRD, a radio station (96.7 FM) licensed to serve Fayetteville, Arkansas, which held the call sign KDYN-FM from 1985 to 2012
