= WGTB-CD =

Television station in Charlotte, North Carolina

- Charlotte, North Carolina; United States
- Channels: Digital: 27 (UHF); Virtual: 28
- Branding: WordNet

Programming
- Subchannels: 28.1: Religious
- Affiliations: TCT, The Walk TV

Ownership
- Owner: Victory Christian Center, Inc. (sale to Weigel Broadcasting pending)
- Sister stations: WOGR, WOGR-FM, WGAS

History
- Founded: September 1996
- First air date: November 1996
- Former call signs: W28AC (November–December 1996); WGTB-LP (December 1996–2013)
- Former channel numbers: Analog: 28 (UHF, 1996–2012); Digital: 28 (UHF, 2012–2020)
- Call sign meaning: Word of God Television Broadcasting

Technical information
- Licensing authority: FCC
- Facility ID: 70097
- Class: CD
- ERP: 15 kW
- HAAT: 405.7 m (1,331 ft)
- Transmitter coordinates: 35°21′44.5″N 81°9′18.3″W

Links
- Public license information: Public file; LMS
- Website: https://wordnet.org/tv

WGTB-CD (channel 28) is a low-power, Class A religious television station in Charlotte, North Carolina, United States. The station's transmitter is located near Dallas, North Carolina, along the Catawba River. WGTB-CD is owned by Victory Christian Center, a charismatic megachurch in Charlotte, which also owns a network of gospel music stations fronted by WOGR (1540 AM) in Charlotte. Together, they form the Word of God Broadcasting Network, and operate from studios on the campus of the church's middle school on Carrier Drive (near the I-85–Beatties Ford Road interchange) in north Charlotte.

== History ==
The station signed on in November 1996 under the call letters W28AC before acquiring the WGTB-LP call sign a month later. From May 2007 to December 5, 2011, MyNetworkTV affiliate WMYT-TV (channel 55) carried WGTB-LP on its third subchannel. It was also available on Time Warner Cable channel 113. On August 1, 2012, WGTB-LP flash-cut to digital operations, also on channel 28. While the station's analog signal was essentially limited to the city of Charlotte, its digital signal decently covers most of the Charlotte metropolitan area. However, it is not carried on any of the area's cable systems. On January 7, 2013, the station changed its call sign to the current WGTB-CD.

On October 13, 2026, it was announced that Weigel Broadcasting would purchase WGTB-CD for $600,000, pending approval of the Federal Communications Commission (FCC).

== Programming ==
In addition to local and national religious programming and some secular shows, WGTB-CD carries programming from Tri-State Christian Television and The Walk TV. It also airs a block of children's E/I programming on Saturday mornings to comply with the station's Class A license.

== Subchannel ==
Subchannel of WGTB-CD
Subchannel	Res.	Short name	Programming
28.1	480i	WGTB-CD	Main WGTB-CD programming (4:3)
