= WOGR (AM) =

Coordinates: 35°16′26″N 80°51′40″W

- Charlotte, North Carolina; United States
- Frequency: 1540 kHz

Programming
- Format: Urban Gospel; Christian talk and teaching
- Affiliations: Salem Radio Network

Ownership
- Owner: Victory Christian Center, Inc.
- Sister stations: WOGR-FM, WGAS, W202BW, WGTB-CD

History
- First air date: 1964
- Former call signs: WRPL (1964–1979); WQCC (1979–1989)

Technical information
- Licensing authority: FCC
- Facility ID: 70092
- Class: D
- Power: 2,400 watts day
- Transmitter coordinates: 35° 16' 26" N, 80° 51' 40" W
- Repeaters: 1420 kHz (South Gastonia), 88.3 (Harrisburg), 93.3 (Salisbury)

Links
- Public license information: Public file; LMS
- Website: www.wordnet.org

WOGR (1540 AM) is a radio station in Charlotte, North Carolina. The station has an urban gospel radio format with some Christian talk and teaching programs. It is owned by Victory Christian Center, a charismatic megachurch in Charlotte. Programming is simulcast on WOGR-FM (93.3) in Salisbury, WGAS (1420 AM) in South Gastonia and FM translator W202BW (88.3 MHz) in Harrisburg. VCC also owns low-powered Christian television station WGTB-CD. Together, these stations are branded as the "Word of God Broadcasting Network" (WordNet), airing from studios at the church's middle school in northwest Charlotte.

WOGR is a daytimer, powered at 2,400 watts, using a directional antenna. Because AM 1540 is a clear channel frequency reserved for Class A stations KXEL in Waterloo, Iowa and ZNS-1 in Nassau, Bahamas, WOGR must sign-off the air at sunset.

== Translators ==
In addition to the main station and WOGR-FM, WOGR (AM) is relayed by an additional translator to widen its broadcast area.

Broadcast translator for WOGR-FM
Call sign	Frequency	City of license	FID	ERP (W)	Class	FCC info
W202BW	88.3 FM	Harrisburg, North Carolina	87356	10	D	LMS

== History ==
The station was originally constructed and owned by Risden Allen Lyon. The call sign was WRPL (the initials of Lyon's father, Robert Phillip Lyon). WRPL signed on in 1964, broadcasting with 1,000 watts, daytime only, from radio studios in a building that Lyon owned at 1402 East Morehead Street in Charlotte, the location of his father's drugstore. The tower was located near the intersection of Monroe Road and East 5th Street. A 155-foot tower was located on Tuckaseegee Road. "Ripple Radio" (using a harp to make the ripple sound) was the second radio station in Charlotte to appeal to Black people, WGIV being the first. Though the staff was integrated, Black people played rhythm and blues records and talked about news of the Black community. Manager Reid Leath, formerly of WIST and WWOK, said Charlotte was the 25th largest market in the country for Black people and that their income and buying habits were both growing. Program director "Pal Mal" Harrison would have an afternoon show oriented toward younger people including white teens. David "Jo-Jo" Samuels had worked in Philadelphia and Augusta, Georgia. Maxie Withers would deliver women's news in "Memo from Maxie". Rev. Norman Kerry would play Christian music and spirituals on "Heavenly Highway". Calvin Beckwith would play jazz on Sunday afternoon. Jason Roseboro, a Johnson C. Smith University student, worked at the local newspaper Queen City Gazette. Rhyming titles included "Duke of Wax", "Newscast at Half Past" and "Weather Scene at Fifteen". On August 15, 1965, Leath said WRPL would switch to "top pop", leaving WGIV as the only Black station in Charlotte, though WRPL would continue to do Black community affairs programming. Two Black DJs were replaced with white DJs. Starting September 29, 1965, WRPL played soft music with all female DJs; at the time that format was used, the call letters WSHE were considered. Then WRPL played middle of the road music and then Top 40 again.

WRPL changed to a progressive rock format in the early 1970s that included jazz, "presented in a sophisticated manner", targeting listeners 20 to 40. For the first time, the station was profitable. Calvin Walker, who played progressive rock on WRNA-FM, joined the station April 21, 1973 hosting "Phase II". Walker later filled several roles including the afternoon DJ known as "Calvin". Gil Stamper did the news starting in 1972, and morning host Al Cafaro joined the staff in July 1974. Rhonda Mosley and Digby O'Dell had the midday show, Chris Hensley did early afternoons and the last slot before signoff, and Rick Helms and Wanda Schotz worked weekends. The age of the staff averaged 25.

This format found much popularity in Charlotte. Cafaro went on to become Chairman of A&M Records. Other DJs during that period were Daniel 'This is Daniel' Brunty, Dave Bell and Edward Theodore Faircloth. Brunty went on to WQDR in Raleigh, North Carolina. Following 2 years in Afghanistan, where he served as a Sr NATO Advisor to the Afghan Army Communications Directorate, Edward is now a software executive with Xytech Systems in Los Angeles.

Bell was afternoon host when he was one of seven out of 11 full-time employees let go in January 1975, and Cafaro replaced him while still doing mornings. Brunty did middays and production. Faircloth and Chris Hensley were part-time weekend DJs.

Cafaro was hired first as a DJ and salesman and later became general manager. Hensley was program director. Brunty was known for wild stunts such as an imaginary Thanksgiving parade with Henry Kissinger hanging from a balloon, and telling people he was seriously injured and had bionic body parts. Most of the music came from albums and, with few sponsors, the station could play music for 10 or 15 minutes without interruption. In one TV commercial, a disc jockey showed a small stack of 45s and said that represented what other stations played. Then he showed a large stack of 45s and said this was what "The Ripple" played.

In October 1976, WRPL announced it would play classical music on a Sunday morning show hosted by Harold Lynne of New World Records.

WRPL switched to a three-fourths disco and one fourth jazz on January 22, 1979, with progressive rock limited to a Sunday program called "Eclectic Corner".

In October 1979, the station changed its call letters to WQCC. It started a country music format (the call letters stood for "Charlotte Country"). This did not work so a switch to "Charlotte's solid gold radio" with oldies and beach music took place in April 1980.

The format later evolved into a more 70s-based sound. Then The PTL Club engineer and Heritage Village Church manager Terry White bought a 40 percent interest in the station from Risben Lyon. On October 13, 1980, WQCC switched to "varied types of Christian music, from hymns to gospel to rock" along with teaching and Christian-oriented news.

The Lyon family sold the radio station in 1983.

WQCC upgraded its signal from 1,000 watts. On October 3, 1986, Charlotte Mayor Harvey Gantt officially turned on the 10,000-watt transmitter.

Charlotte-based Satellite Radio Network started a 24-hour gospel music service July 4, 1987, with hopes for affiliates across the U.S. WQCC carried the programming part-time. Satellite Radio Networks of Dallas, Texas later distributed the programming for American Gospel Network.

In the 1990s, with the call letters WOGR, the station added additional signals--WGAS in Gastonia, North Carolina on 1420 AM, and WOGR-FM in Salisbury, North Carolina on 93.3 FM.

== Call sign history ==
The station's call letters were changed to WQCC from WRPL on 11/01/1979, and to WOGR on 03/27/1989.
