= WGIP =

WGIP may refer to:

- Working Group on Indigenous Populations
- WCGT, a radio station (88.7 FM) licensed to serve Clintonville, Pennsylvania, United States, which held the call sign WGIP from 2010 to 2020
- WPKC (AM), a radio station (1540 AM) licensed to serve Exeter, New Hampshire, United States, which held the call sign WGIP from October 1998 to March 2009
