= WGAS =

- South Gastonia, North Carolina; United States
- Frequency: 1420 kHz
- Branding: Wordnet 1420

Programming
- Format: Urban Gospel; Christian talk and teaching

Ownership
- Owner: Victory Christian Center
- Sister stations: WOGR, WOGR-FM, W202BW

History
- Call sign meaning: W GAStonia

Technical information
- Licensing authority: FCC
- Class: D
- Power: 500 watts (days); 41 watts (nights)
- Transmitter coordinates: 35°10′57″N 81°12′34″W

Links
- Public license information: Public file; LMS
- Webcast: listen live
- Website: WordNet.org

WGAS (1420 kHz) is an AM radio station in South Gastonia, North Carolina. The station has an urban gospel radio format with some Christian talk and teaching programs. It is owned by Victory Christian Center, Inc. Programming is simulcast on 93.3 WOGR-FM Salisbury, WOGR 1540 AM Charlotte and FM translator W202BW at 88.3 MHz in Harrisburg.

By day, WGAS is powered at 500 watts. But to protect other stations on 1420 AM, at night it reduces power to only 41 watts. It uses a non-directional antenna.
