= Ken Prewitt =

- Born: Kenneth Bernard Prewitt; December 14, 1946; Washington, D.C.
- Died: April 11, 2015 (aged 68); Manhattan
- Education: University of North Carolina at Chapel Hill
- Spouse: Faye (Pappas) Prewitt
- Presenting career
- Show: "The First Word"
- Station: WBBR
- Network: Bloomberg Radio
- Time slot: 5:00 AM – 7:00 AM
- Show: "Surveillance"
- Station: WBBR
- Network: Bloomberg Radio
- Time slot: 6:00 AM – 10:00 AM
- Style: News
- Country: United States

Kenneth Bernard Prewitt (December 14, 1946 — April 11, 2015) was an American radio news anchor who reported on economic news for CBS, ABC, and Bloomberg Radio networks. Together with Tom Keene, he co-anchored Bloomberg Radio's flagship program, Bloomberg Surveillance, from 2005 to 2013. According to Bloomberg, he was seen as the authoritative voice through interviewing many Wall Street billionaires and the former Federal Reserve chairman. Prewitt died April 11, 2015, at his home in Manhattan, from complications caused by brain cancer. He had been on leave since receiving the diagnosis in 2013.

== See also ==
- Tom Keene
