= Gippie's Kingdom =

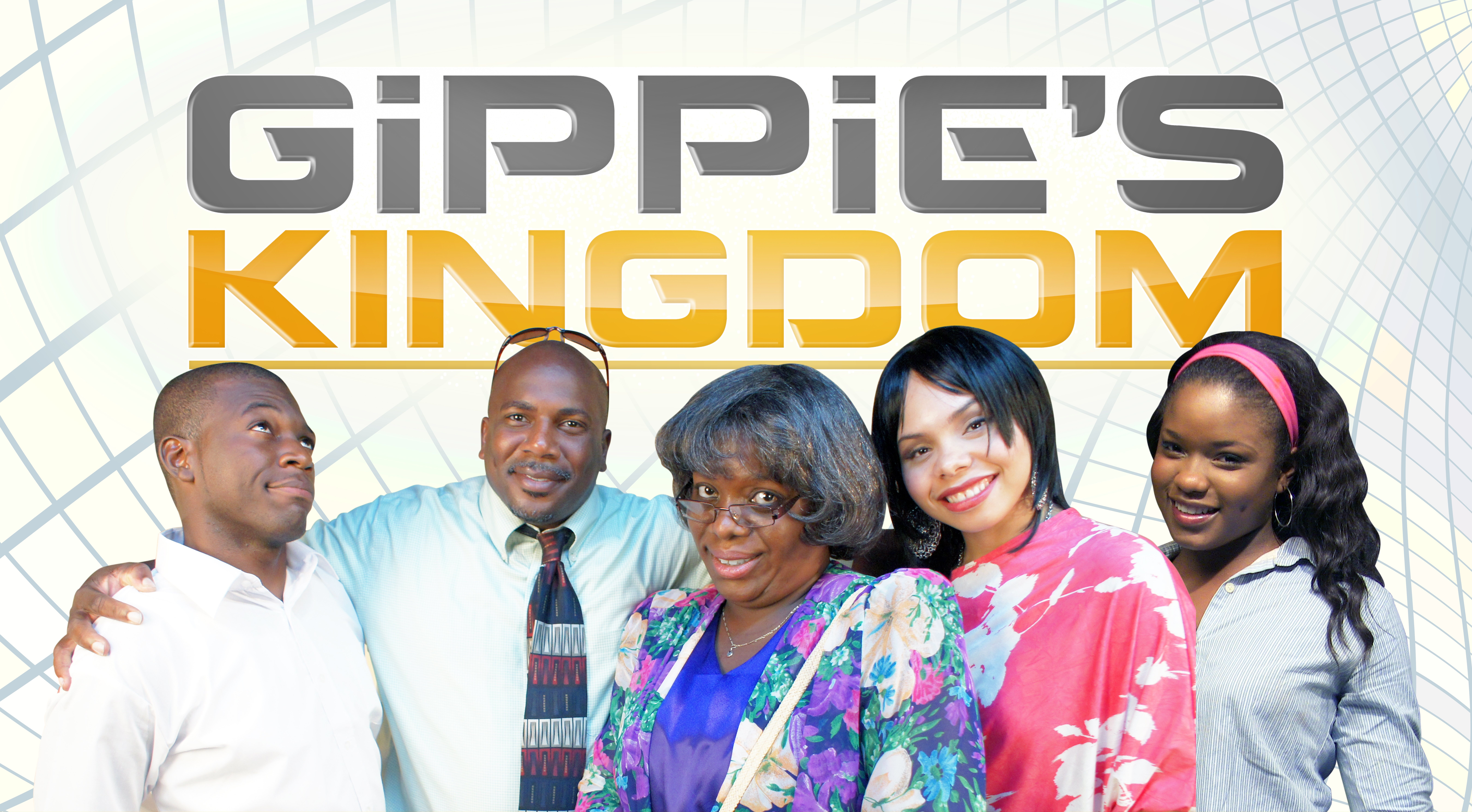
- Gibson family with logo
- Genre: Soap opera
- Created by: Ian Strachan and Travon Patton
- Written by: Ian Strachan
- Starring: Chigozie Ijeoma, Matthew Wildgoose, Shirley Taylor
- Theme music composer: Christin Taylor
- Country of origin: The Bahamas
- Original language: English
- No. of episodes: 8

Production
- Producers: Ian Strachan and Travon Patton
- Running time: 22 mins

Original release
- Network: ZNS-TV13, Cable12
- Release: 13 June 2012

Gippie's Kingdom (GK) is the first Bahamian television soap opera.

It first aired on the Broadcasting Corporation of The Bahamas, 13 June 2012 for 14 weeks and is set to rebroadcast on the Cable12 Community Channel on 27 May 2013. The second season of Gippie's Kingdom is expected to premiere in the fall of 2013. The show features Chigozie Ijeoma as Everett Harrison Gibson, otherwise known as "Gippie" and other performances such as Matthew Wildgoose as "Kirby" and Shirley Taylor as "Mama Tilda". The series is owned by The Gippie's Kingdom Company (est. 25 January 2012), created by the soap's Writer and Director, Ian G. Strachan and Director of Photography/ Editor, Travon A. Patton. Gippie's Kingdom: Season One started taping in high definition in the summer of 2011 for 18 days, using various locations in Nassau, Bahamas. Gippie's Kingdom: Season One is a half-hour in length and is composed of 8-episodes. Season One is being broadcast in ten Caribbean jurisdictions, beginning in the spring of 2013: Barbados, Trinidad, Cayman, Belize, St. Lucia, Tortola, Anguilla, Grenada, Turks and Caicos, and Jamaica. Season Two of the series seeks to expand the plot-line to 12+ episodes.

The Gippie's Kingdom Company, headed by Dr. Ian Strachan and Travon Patton, launched the first Bahamian televised soap opera in the summer of 2012 on ZNS TV13. The series explores Bahamian life while featuring a cast of over 30 Bahamian actors and a variety of plots and subplots. Gippie's Kingdom follows the story of three generations of the Gibson family, including themes such as "sweet-hearting" and "illegitimate children," juvenile delinquency, crime and justice, and the Haitian/ Bahamian conflict.

== Synopsis ==
The story begins with Everett Harrison Gibson or "Gippie", an enterprising businessman who finds himself in the middle of the storm that engulfs his children: his eldest son Junior lies in a coma, having been shot by a jealous rival, his eldest daughter Monique has returned home because her marriage is in serious trouble, his youngest daughter Everena is dating a known drug dealer, and his "outside son" Evan, normally a model student, has begun to act out at school in violent ways.

== Schedule ==
Gippie's Kingdom: Season One aired on ZNS TV13 every Wednesdays at 8:30pm and Sundays at 10pm during its debut 14-week run in 2012. This season is scheduled to re-run on Cable12 Community Channel every Mondays at 8pm and Thursdays at 10pm, starting 27 May 2013.

== Cast: Season One ==
Chigozie Ijeoma (Gippie): Sophia Smith (Willamae): Arthur Maycock (Everett Jr.): Fanchon Dawkins (Monique): Veronica Dorsett (Everena): Jackson Petit (Evan): Phillipa Moss (Laydeedra): Shirley Taylor (Clotilda): Diana Armbrister (Constance): Julian Reid (Rev. Davis): Darion Spence (Sir. Lawrence): Matthew Wildgoose (Kirby): Thomas Robinson (Detective. Samuels): Julie Bingham (Mrs. Samuels): Veronica Toppin (Principal): P. Scott Adderley (Donovan): Tony McCartney (Keith Brooks): Leano Fritz (Kayron): Gernico Culmer (Shooter/Sean): Tonya Laramore (Riann): Chaquita Culmer (Marvinette): Stephen Sears (Jason): Tanarge Fraser (Freddy): Valicia Rolle (Estelle): Erin Knowles (Reporter/ Nurse): Brentwood Burrows (Dr. Rahming) Patricia Ferguson (Ms. Bullard): Kenard Maronard (Jefferson)

== Crew: Season One ==
Producers: Ian G. Strachan, Travon Patton

Writer/ Director: Ian Strachan

Asst. Director: Toni Francis

Director of Photography: Travon Patton

Editors: Travon Patton, Asst. Jackson Petit

Motion Graphic Effects: Reyernaldo Delva, Asst. Jackson Petit

Score/ Sound Engineering: Christin Taylor

Graphic Work: Neville Kenton Rolle

Production Management: Erin Knowles

Boom Operations: Toni Francis

== Musical credits (2012) ==
- Brent Darville - 'Come Let me Go Down', 'Rastafari Music'
- Novi Pierre - 'Wine up mi bumper'
- Christin Taylor - 'Gippie's Kingdom Theme'
