= Rochambeau French International School =

Rochambeau The French International School
- Lycée Français de Washington

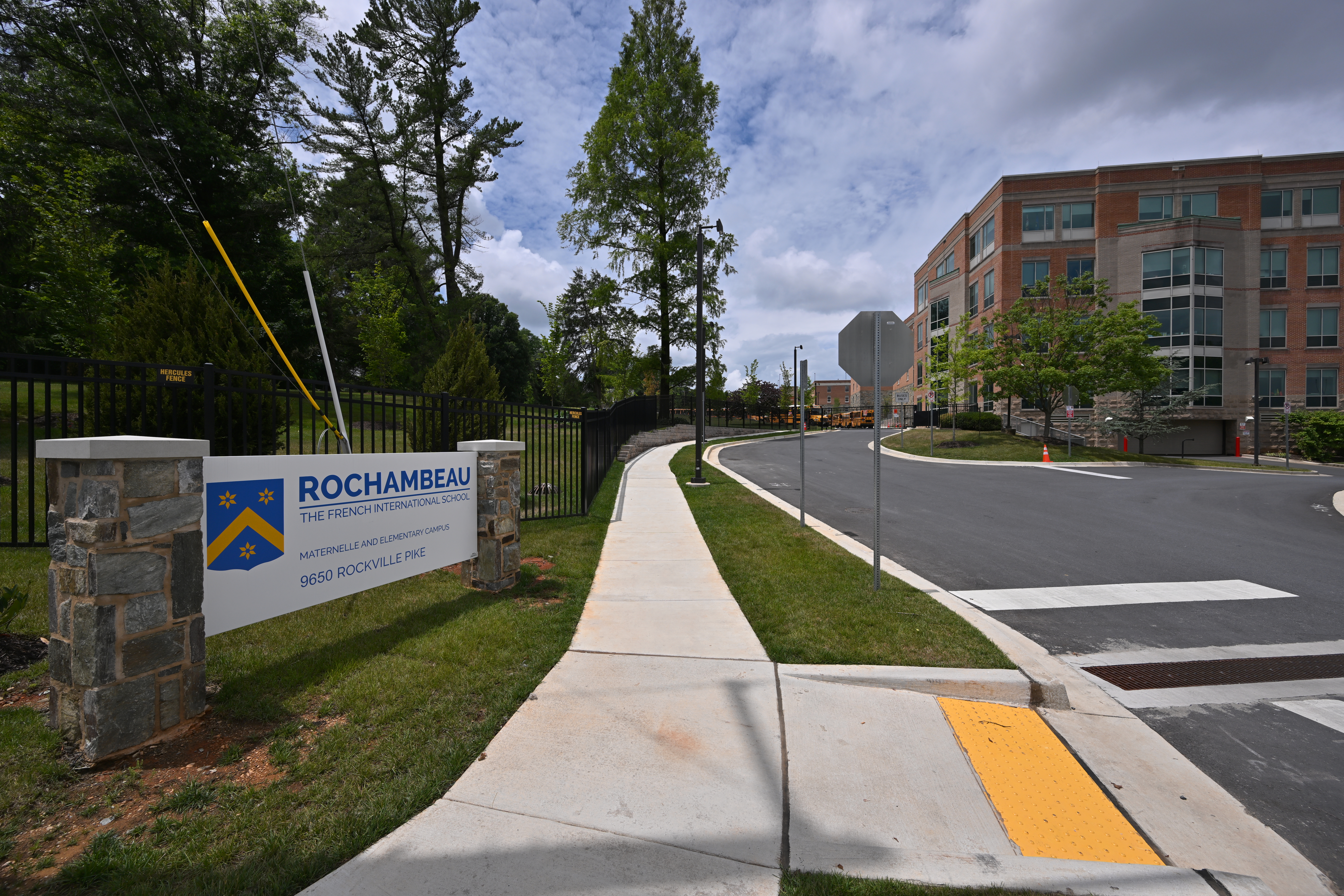

Location
- Maplewood Campus; Preschool–Grade 5 & Administrative Offices; 9650 Rockville Pike; Bethesda, MD 20814 Forest Road Campus; Grades 6–12; 9600 Forest Road; Bethesda, MD 20814; United States; 39.013640°N 77.101166°W

Information
- Type: Independent
- Established: 1955
- Proviseur: Xavier Jacquenet
- Grades: Nursery (age 2) - Grade 12
- Gender: Coeducational
- Language: French, English
- Campus: Suburban, spread over 2 campuses
- Mascot: Fox Mousquetaire
- Website: https://www.rochambeau.org/

Rochambeau The French International School is a private French international school in Bethesda, Montgomery County, Maryland, United States of America.

== History ==
Rochambeau The French International School was founded in 1955, and has a current total enrollment of approximately 1,200 students, the largest of the nine French schools in the United States. Rochambeau The French International School, formerly known as Lycée Rochambeau, is a non-denominational, coeducational, day school serving students from nursery (age 2, toute petite section) through high school and the last year of the French secondary system (Terminale) on two campuses located just outside the city of Washington, DC. Rochambeau offers a French Immersion program for non-French speakers from nursery school until 3rd grade.

In 1992 the school had plans for a new campus for all grades K-12 and the administration in an area in Potomac, Maryland, and that year it acquired land there. Area residents complained as they feared there would be more vehicular traffic. Liz Spayd of the Washington Post wrote "The community's opposition has been interpreted by some to be a thinly veiled attempt to keep foreigners out of Potomac". In November 1993 the county planning board gave disapproval to the French school's plans there.

== Campuses ==
Rochambeau French International School operates two campuses in Bethesda, Maryland:

- Maplewood Campus - Preschool & Elementary School
  Nursery (age 2) through Grade 5 & Administrative Offices
  9650 Rockville Pike, Bethesda, MD 20814
- Forest Road Campus - Middle & High School
  Grade 6 through Grade 12
  9600 Forest Road, Bethesda, MD 20814

The Maplewood Campus opened in 2022 and was formally inaugurated on May 10, 2023.

The school formerly operated separate Preschool and Elementary campuses on Bradley Boulevard in Bethesda and in nearby Chevy Chase, respectively. Both locations are no longer in use by the school. The opening of Maplewood Campus in 2022 consolidated the two campuses into a single location.

== Student body ==
About forty-nine percent of students hold French citizenship (with a large percentage of those holding a second citizenship), fourteen percent (14%) are U.S. citizens, and thirty-seven percent (37%) come from fifty-five other nations. Many Rochambeau students come from families who are in Washington, D.C., on postings with embassies, foreign-owned corporations, and multilateral organizations.

In 1993, most students came from countries that spoke French, including France, Belgium, and countries in Africa.

== Graduation requirements ==
To receive the high school diploma accredited by the state of Maryland, Rochambeau students must complete a minimum of 21 Carnegie units. Twenty of these units must be in specified areas:

- 4 units in English
- 4 units in French
- 4 units in Social studies to include 1 credit in U.S. History
- 3 units in Science
- 3 units in Mathematics
- 2 units in a third foreign language

The French Baccalauréat degree is awarded only when a student has completed a fifth year of study and has passed the Baccalauréat examinations.

Because the Maryland-accredited high school diploma is usually awarded to students before their last year of study at Rochambeau, students who have earned the diploma and who plan to attend U.S. colleges and universities have the option of leaving Rochambeau without completing the Terminale year and without sitting for the Baccalauréat examinations. More than ninety-five percent (95%) of students at Rochambeau, however, choose to stay for the Terminale year in order to sit for the Baccalauréat examinations.

== Structure and curriculum ==
All French lycées follow the academic curriculum established by the French National Ministry of Education. Rochambeau's faculty members are certified by the same French ministry. The student-faculty ratio is 10 to 1, with all courses being taught in French. However, English and U.S. civilization classes are taught in English, along with History classes in the International Baccalauréat section (see OIB section of this article). Beginning in the first year of Middle School (6ème), Spanish, German and Arabic are offered as a second language, with each student having to choose one of those languages. English language instruction is offered at four levels with placement depending on a student's level of proficiency: Group 1 – ESL; Group 2 – standard English; Group 3 – Honors English; and Group 4—OIB English. During the Terminale year, Groups 1 and 2 and Groups 3 and 4 are combined, and a separate Group is created for the OIB section. In addition, students may enroll in a Latin class, which is made available to them at the beginning of Middle School and continues on until the final year of High School. Theater, Cinema, Art and Music may be chosen separately as optional classes during the first year of High School.

== French Baccalauréat ==
During the last two years of French secondary education (Première and Terminale), students choose concentrations in one of the following specialized academic tracks (Séries du Baccalauréat):

- Série L (Languages, Literature and Humanities)
- Série ES (Economics and Social Sciences)
- Série S (Mathematics and Sciences)

In addition to their concentration courses, all Rochambeau students are required to enroll in English, a second modern foreign language in addition to English (Spanish, German, Italian, Arabic, etc.), history and geography, and philosophy.

Baccalauréat examinations are developed at the French national level, with the same examinations being given at lycées worldwide at the end of the Première and Terminale years. Each section of the Baccalauréat examinations consists of a series of essays requiring in-depth analysis and a well-reasoned response. The written section of the Baccalauréat is scheduled over a two-week period, encompassing 17–32 hours of testing. Students also present two to four oral examinations. Over the past ten years, the success rate on the Baccalauréat examination at Rochambeau has averaged approximately 96.2%, with over 66% of the students receiving honors, compared with the annual pass rate at 90.95% at other French lycées in the U.S.

However, there has recently been a change to the structure of the French Baccalauréat exam which has dissolved these specialized academic tracks. Rochambeau is fully incorporating these changes into their curriculum as of the 2019–2020 academic year.

=== International Option of the French Baccalauréat (OIB) ===
Within the context of the Baccalauréat's international options (the option internationale du baccalauréat, or OIB) Rochambeau offers the American Option. Rochambeau's OIB American Option, which is taught by French and American faculty, is an optional three-year program that offers students advanced level studies in English language and literature and an integrated curriculum in world history and geography. The OIB is not a separate diploma, but rather an additional specialization within the framework of any of the three Séries of the Baccalauréat. The concept, curriculum, and evaluation standards of the OIB American Option have been developed by the French Ministry of Education and the Advanced Placement Division of the College Board. To meet the requirements of Rochambeau's OIB specialization, students must pass rigorous written and oral examinations given in English and evaluated by external examiners provided by the Advanced Placement Division of the College Board.

== Alumni ==
- Florent Groberg
- Francine Lacqua

== See also ==
- American School of Paris – An American international school in France
- Collèges - Initial Secondary school education system in France
- Lycées - Secondary school education system in France
