= Tom Keene (radio host) =

American author and radio host

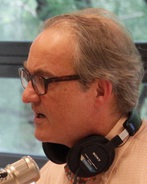
- Born: Thomas Ross Keene; December 9, 1952 (age 73); New York City, U.S.
- Occupations: Radio personality, Television host, Editor

Thomas Ross Keene (born December 9, 1952) is an American journalist and Chartered Financial Analyst. He is a host of Bloomberg Surveillance on Bloomberg Radio and Bloomberg Podcasts.

== Background ==
Keene was raised in Rochester, New York. He graduated from the Rochester Institute of Technology and was also enrolled in the external program at The London School of Economics and Political Science. In 1992 he released a New England folk album called Searching for Ward and June. Keene is a Chartered Financial Analyst and member of the CFA Institute, the National Association of Business Economics, and the Economic Club of New York. Keene began his career gaining a "humiliating investment experience in the options market", of which Keene has said, "you learn so much enjoying losing money, learning way more on the downside than on the upside". Keene is the author of Flying on One Engine: The Bloomberg Book of Master Market Economists.

== Bloomberg career ==
When his investment business slowed down after September 11, 2001, Keene contacted David Tamburelli at Bloomberg LP which led to him being interviewed by Matt Winkler, editor-in-chief of Bloomberg News, who hired him on the spot. Tom Keene started developing the idea of doing a one-hour radio show on the economy: Bloomberg on the Economy.

During his time at Bloomberg LP, Keene also helped to create Bloomberg Surveillance, a radio broadcast in which he and his co-hosts (formerly Ken Prewitt, Michael McKee, Sara Eisen, David Gura, now Jonathan Ferro) conduct interviews and provide analysis of current financial news and economic trends. The broadcast is heard in New York City on WBBR 1130, Boston WBOS 92.9FM, San Francisco KNEW 960, Washington WDCH-FM 99.1 and across North America on Sirius XM Radio satellite channel 121.

Towards the end of the 2000s, an ad-free audio version of Bloomberg Surveillance, the morning radio show hosted by Tom Keene and Ken Prewitt, became the first truly popular podcast on Bloomberg.com, making audio files available for download that thus were no longer exclusive to the Bloomberg Professional services. At the time Bloomberg Surveillance, was still followed by its 1-hour radio and podcast extension called 'Bloomberg on the Economy' in which Keene continued to conduct one-on-one in-depth interviews with distinguished guests from finance and academics. Bloomberg LP used these radio programs to conduct media trials with the new podcast format.

As Keene's radio programs became ever more popular during the 2008 financial crisis and in the run-up to the much propagated 2010 Obama Tax Cuts, Keene's radio program increasingly 'broke in' into Bloomberg's TV broadcasts. As the years passed the radio studio increasingly looked like a TV-studio, before finally, the TV-studio looked like a radio studio (which is still a feature of Tom Keene's TV- and radio simulcasts). After the passing of his mentor Ken Prewitt, Tom Keene paid an on-air tribute, praising Prewitt for all the help he'd been giving at the beginning of Keene's career at Bloomberg Media.

In 2010, Keene began anchoring the television program Surveillance Midday, covering daily business news from Wall Street and since June 2012, the television program Bloomberg Surveillance with Francine Lacqua and Jonathan Ferro, weekday mornings on Bloomberg Television.

Keene is famous for wearing Hermès bowties, which became his signature.

Keene wrote a weekly interview column and blog, EconoChat, for Bloomberg Businessweek and the Chart of the Day article, available through the Bloomberg Professional services.
