= WPKC-FM =

Radio station in Sanford, Maine

- Sanford, Maine; United States
- Broadcast area: Portland, Maine; Portsmouth, New Hampshire
- Frequency: 92.1 MHz

Programming
- Format: Contemporary Christian
- Network: K-Love

Ownership
- Owner: Educational Media Foundation
- Sister stations: WARX; WMSJ; WNHI; WPKC

History
- First air date: October 10, 1975
- Former call signs: WSME-FM (1974–1983); WEBI (1983–1986); WCDQ (1986–1999); WPHX-FM (1999–2011); WXEX-FM (2011–2023)

Technical information
- Licensing authority: FCC
- Facility ID: 74067
- Class: A
- ERP: 1,800 watts
- HAAT: 156 meters (512 ft)
- Transmitter coordinates: 43°25′11.3″N 70°48′7.2″W

Links
- Public license information: Public file; LMS
- Webcast: Listen live
- Website: www.klove.com

WPKC-FM (92.1 FM) is a radio station licensed to Sanford, Maine, United States. The station serves the Southern Maine Coast and the Seacoast Region of New Hampshire with a contemporary Christian music format, supplied by the K-Love network. WPKC-FM is owned by the Educational Media Foundation and simulcasts with WPKC (1540 AM) from Exeter.

== History ==
The station originally went on the air October 10, 1975, as WSME-FM, with an automated Drake-Chenault adult contemporary/oldies hybrid format. The call sign was changed to WEBI on April 23, 1983, and to WCDQ on September 1, 1986.

WCDQ was well known for its on-air staff, as well as creative programming. One such program was "Dead Tracks", an all-Grateful Dead program broadcast on Thursday nights at 10 p.m. Another program was "Blue Monday", featuring all blues music hosted by "The First Lady of Mt. Rialto" Sharon Small. Two other groundbreaking programs were "Mt. Rialto Redemption", a reggae music show, and "Local Chords", an opportunity for local, unsigned bands to get their material played on the radio. It was hosted by Steve Biron, who also did afternoons. The show would later be hosted by Pete Casper "The Friendly DJ".

WCDQ claimed that it broadcast from "The Summit of Mt. Rialto", a reference to the common name for movie theaters, popular in the 1930s through the 1950s. It was sometimes called Mt. Rialto Radio. Another fictional locale often referenced by the station was "The Elegante Ballroom", a cavernous hall from which the station's lunch time show was supposedly broadcast. The ruse of the station's broadcast locale was so well done (complete with summit ski and weather reports) that occasionally students from the University of New Hampshire would travel to Sanford with the intent of hiking the non-existent mountain.

WCDQ heralded the weekend's arrival every Friday at 5 p.m. by playing "Switchin' To Glide" by The Kings.

The secondary tag line for the radio station was "The Theater of the Mind". This was based on the fact that WCDQ produced its own original radio plays, similar to "The Shadow" and "The Lone Ranger" radio shows from the 1930s and 1940s, before televisions were a common household item. WCDQ staff wrote original plays, together with original music, and performed them on the air. Radio plays included a Christmas story entitled "The Miracle of Mt. Rialto", a 1950s high school drama called "Young Lust", and a soap opera-style story called "The Web of Fate".

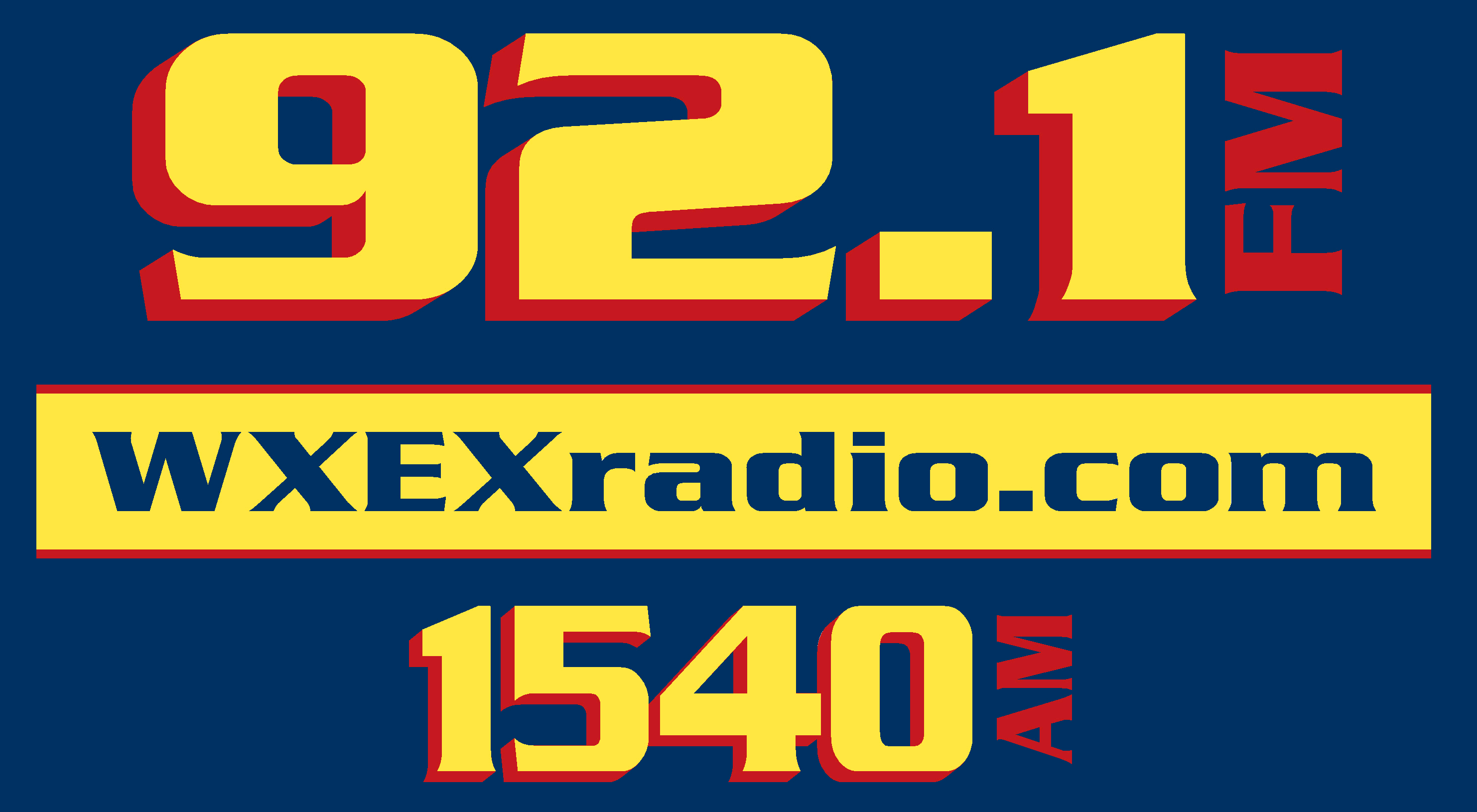
Logo used from August 11, 2011, through August 20, 2015

WCDQ was owned by Donald Crown, who sold the station to Phoenix Media/Communications Group. It became WPHX-FM and began simulcasting WFNX, from the Boston, Massachusetts, radio market in the summer of 1999. Phoenix Media/Communications Group announced a sale of the station to Aruba Capital Holdings, licensee of WXEX in Exeter, New Hampshire, in May 2011. On August 11, 2011, Aruba Capital Holdings relaunched the station as WXEX-FM, a simulcast of the oldies/classic hits programming of WXEX.

On April 14, 2015, Port Broadcasting LLC, owner of WWSF in Sanford, Maine, and WNBP in Newburyport, Massachusetts (and their respective FM translators), began operating WXEX and its AM simulcast partner in Exeter under a local marketing agreement (LMA). On August 20, 2015, WXEX-FM and its sister AM station shifted their format from classic hits to classic rock, branded as "Classic Rock 92.1"; the move was made to distinguish WXEX from WWSF's oldies format. In 2015, a merger was proposed with Garrison City Broadcasting, owners of WBYY and WTSN, but never finalized. Effective January 31, 2017, Aruba Capital sold WXEX-FM, WXEX, and W246BP to LMA partner Port Broadcasting. In return, Aruba Capital received a 26.9 percent stake in Port Broadcasting, giving Aruba Capital principal Andrew Hartmann a controlling interest in the new licensee.

During Labor Day Weekend in 2018, WXEX-FM and WXEX stunted with a broadcast of the Drake-Chenault documentary The History of Rock and Roll. On September 3, 2018, the stations changed to an oldies format, in effect reversing the 2015 format change.

Port Broadcasting agreed to sell WXEX-FM, WXEX, and translators W246BP and W298CU to the Educational Media Foundation (EMF) for $690,000 in April 2023. EMF already operated Air1 station WNHI in Farmington, New Hampshire, with its K-Love network only available via stations in surrounding markets, including WMSJ in Portland, Maine; WAKC in Concord, New Hampshire, and WNKC in Gloucester, Massachusetts. Following the sale's completion on July 24, 2023, the "Seacoast Oldies" programming moved to WWSF on July 24, 2023, and WXEX-FM joined K-Love; the station's call sign was changed to WPKC-FM the same day.
