= Florent Groberg =

French-American military officer & civil servant (born 1983)

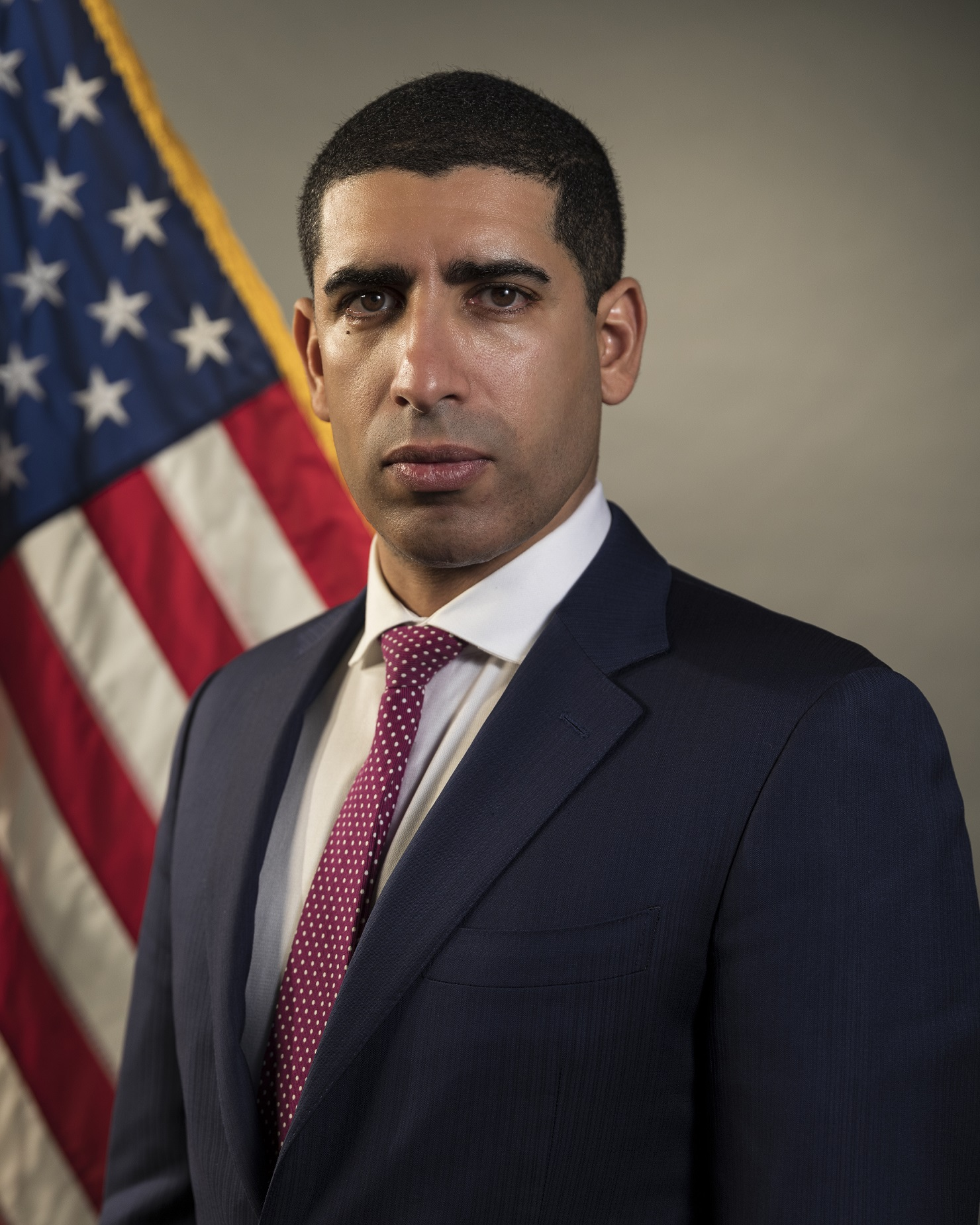
- Groberg in 2022
- Born: May 8, 1983 (age 43); Poissy, France
- Military career
- Allegiance: United States
- Branch: United States Army
- Service years: 2008–2015
- Rank: Captain
- Nickname: "Flo"
- Units: Task Force Mountain Warrior, 4th Infantry Brigade Combat Team, 4th Infantry Division
- Conflicts: War in Afghanistan
- Awards: Medal of Honor; Bronze Star Medal (2); Purple Heart

Florent Ahmed Groberg (born May 8, 1983) is a French-American soldier, retired United States Army officer and civilian employee of the United States Department of Defense. Born in France to an American father and Algerian mother, he became a naturalized United States citizen in 2001. He renounced his French citizenship prior to joining the United States Army in 2008.

He served in the War in Afghanistan where, in August 2012, he was severely injured attempting to thwart a suicide bomber. On November 12, 2015 Groberg received the Medal of Honor for his actions.

== Early life and education ==
Groberg was born in Poissy, France, near Paris, on May 8, 1983. His mother, Klara, who is French, is of Algerian descent. Groberg has never met his biological father. He was raised by his mother and adoptive stepfather, American Larry Groberg, originally from Indiana. Larry was a businessman and his job took him around the world. The family lived in the Paris region until Florent was 6, then moved to Spain and back to France. He did not speak English until he was 11 years old.

When Groberg was in middle school, his family moved to the Chicago area. They settled in Potomac, Maryland, where he continued his studies in French at Lycée Rochambeau in Bethesda, Maryland, before graduating from nearby Walter Johnson High School in June 2001. Groberg became a naturalized U.S. citizen in February 2001. Groberg attended the University of Maryland, College Park and competed in varsity track and cross country. In May 2006, Groberg graduated from the University of Maryland with a Bachelor of Science degree in Criminology and Criminal justice.

In May 2017, Groberg graduated from the University of Maryland University College (UMUC) with a Master of Science degree in Management with a specialization in Intelligence Management. He delivered the commencement keynote speech.

== Military career ==
He entered the United States Army in July 2008 and attended Officer Candidate School at Fort Benning, Georgia. He received his commission as an infantry officer on December 4, 2008. After completing Infantry Officers' Basic Course, Mechanized Leaders Course, US Army Airborne and US Army Ranger Schools, he was assigned to the 4th Infantry Division at Fort Carson, Colorado, as a platoon leader in the 2nd Battalion, 12th Infantry Regiment.

=== In Afghanistan ===
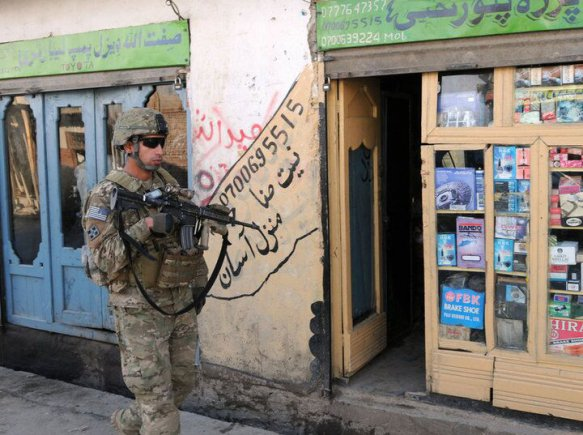
Groberg patrols the city streets of Asadabad, Afghanistan, February 2010.

In November 2009, Groberg deployed to Afghanistan as part of Task Force Lethal, with responsibility for the Pech River Valley in Afghanistan's Kunar Province.

Upon returning home in June 2010, Groberg continued serving as a platoon leader until he was reassigned as an infantry company executive officer from October 2010 to November 2011. He was then assigned as the brigade Personal Security Detachment (PSD) commander for 4th Infantry Brigade Combat Team, 4th Infantry Division. He deployed again to Kunar Province, Afghanistan, in February 2012, with Task Force Mountain Warrior. He was promoted to captain in July 2012.

On the morning of August 8, 2012, Groberg served as a PSD commander for Task Force Mountain Warrior — responsible for the safety of 28 coalition and Afghan National Army (ANA) personnel, including several principals: two brigade commanders, three battalion commanders, the brigade command sergeant major, a battalion command sergeant major and an ANA battalion commander.

The patrol's escort mission included moving on foot from Forward Operating Base Fiaz to the provincial governor's compound in Asadabad, Kunar, Afghanistan for a weekly security meeting.

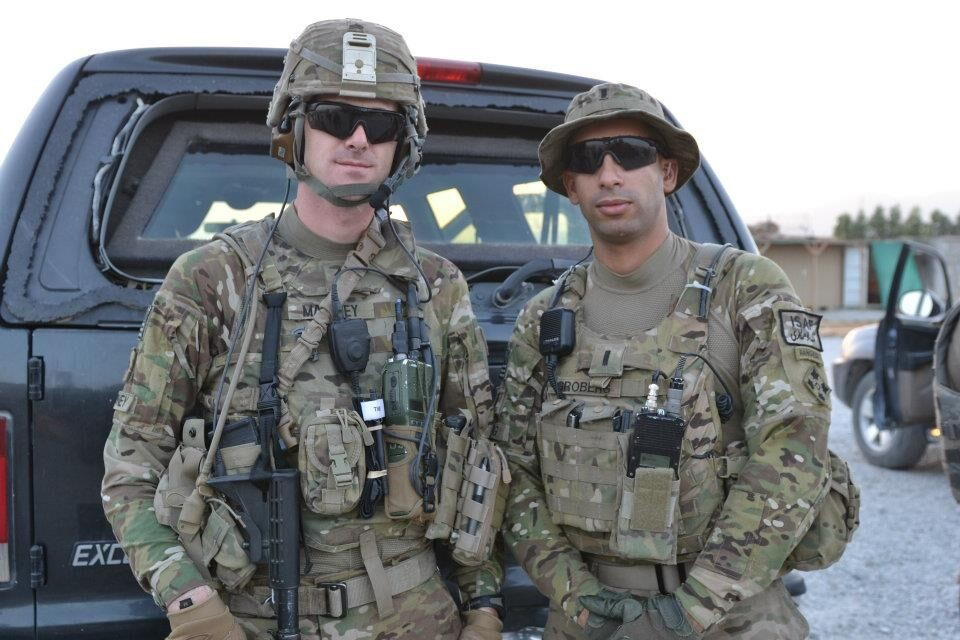
Andrew Mahoney and Groberg

As the patrol advanced towards the governor's compound, they reached the choke point along the route, a small bridge spanning a canal feeding the Kunar River. The patrol halted near the bridge as two motorcycles approached from the opposite direction. The motorcyclists began crossing the bridge, but stopped midway before dismounting and retreating in the opposite direction.

As the patrol observed the motorcyclists, Groberg also spotted a lone individual near the left side of the formation, walking backwards in the direction of the patrol. The individual did not cause immediate alarm as there were other local civilians in the area.

When the individual made an abrupt turn towards the formation, Groberg saw he was wearing a suicide vest. He rushed the suspect and shoved him away from the patrol. Groberg, aided by fellow soldier Sgt. Andrew Mahoney, grabbed the suicide bomber and physically dragged him away from the formation.

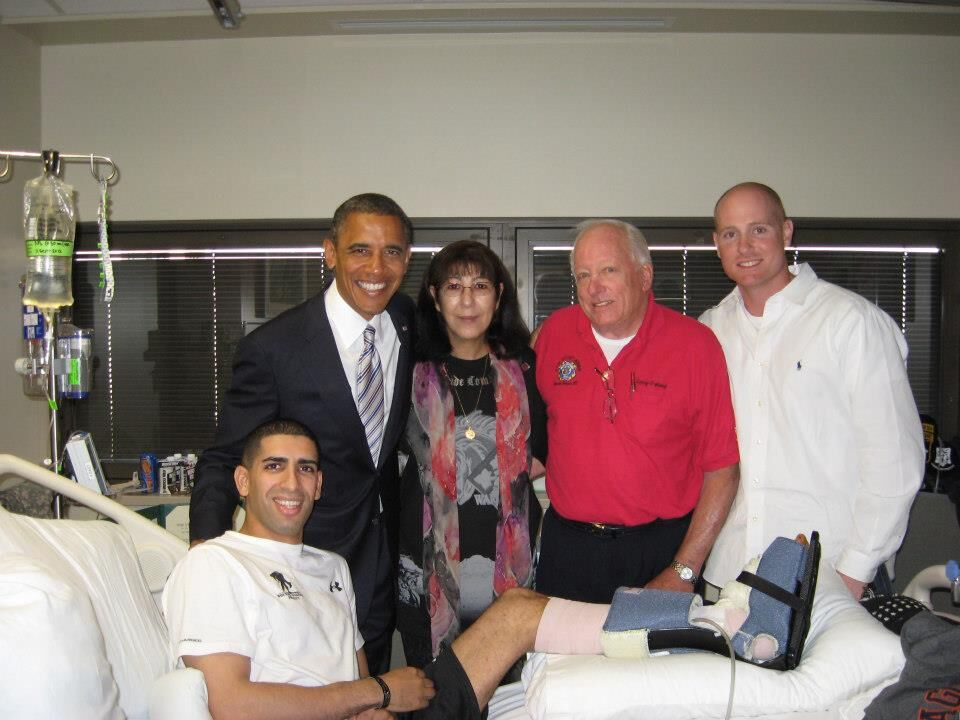
Groberg with President Obama, his parents Klara and Larry Groberg, and friend, Matthew Sanders, on September 11, 2012 at Walter Reed National Medical Center.

Groberg tackled the suicide bomber, who then detonated his device, sending Groberg flying 15 to 20 feet (4.6 to 6.1 m). A second suicide bomber, who was hidden behind a small structure, instantly detonated his device; according to the Army, he detonated prematurely because of Groberg's actions to stop the first bomber. Three U.S. military personnel (U.S. Army Command Sgt. Maj. Kevin J. Griffin, U.S. Army Maj. Thomas E. Kennedy, and U.S. Air Force Maj. Walter D. Gray) and U.S. Foreign Service Officer Ragaei Abdelfattah from the U.S. Agency for International Development were killed and several others were injured.

Despite the loss of life, Groberg's actions prevented the bombers from detonating their devices as planned, which could have killed many more on the patrol.

As a result of his actions, Groberg sustained the loss of 45 to 50 percent of his left calf muscle with significant nerve damage, a blown eardrum, and a mild traumatic brain injury. Groberg spent his recovery at Walter Reed National Military Medical Center from August 2012 to May 2015. He was medically retired from Company B Warriors, Warrior Transition Battalion, as a captain, on July 23, 2015.

=== Medal of Honor ===
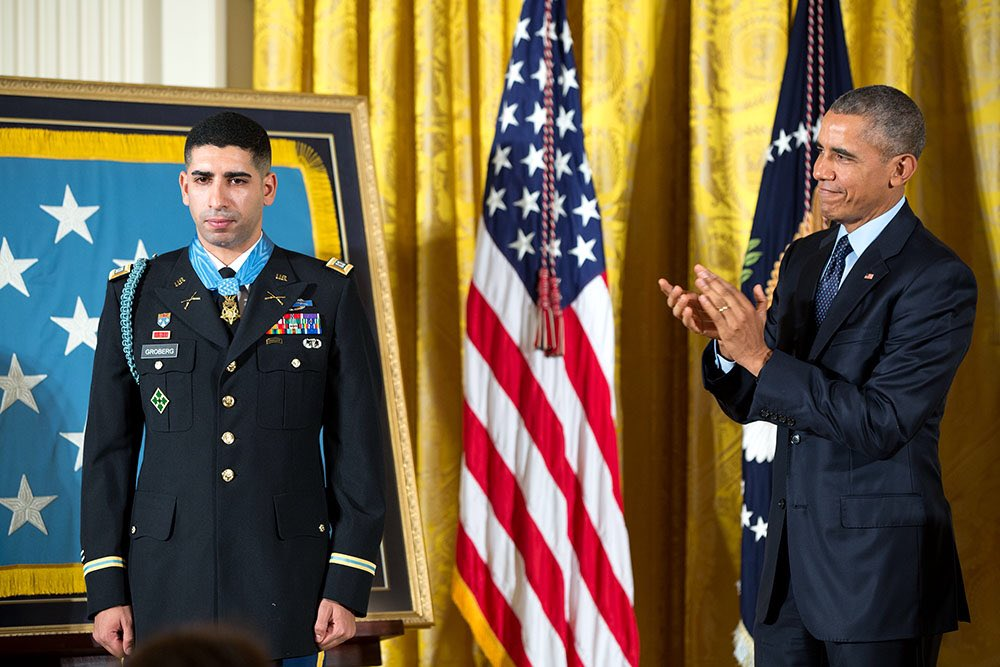
Groberg received the Medal of Honor on November 12, 2015.

For his August 2012 actions, Groberg received the Medal of Honor, the highest military honor in the United States. Groberg is the 19th recipient of the Medal of Honor after the Vietnam War, the first foreign-born recipient since the Vietnam War and the 10th living recipient. President Barack Obama awarded the Medal of Honor to Groberg on November 12, 2015 at a ceremony at the White House.

In a Veterans Day post the day before the ceremony, Obama shared a video about Groberg on Facebook, with the words:

...Flo's team was in Afghanistan, escorting American and Afghan military leaders to a local security meeting when they were approached by a suicide bomber. He jumped into action to protect his team, saving the lives of his fellow servicemembers.

The official citation reads;

Captain Florent A. Groberg distinguished himself by acts of gallantry and intrepidity at the risk of his life above and beyond the call of duty while serving as a Personal Security Detachment Commander for Task Force Mountain Warrior, 4th Infantry Brigade Combat Team, 4th Infantry Division, during combat operations against an armed enemy in Asadbad, Kunar Province, Afghanistan on August 8, 2012. On that day, Captain Groberg was leading a dismounted movement consisting of several senior leaders to include two brigade commanders, two battalion commanders, two command sergeants major, and an Afghanistan National Army brigade commander. As they approached the Provincial Governor's compound, Captain Groberg observed an individual walking close to the formation. When the individual made an abrupt turn towards the formation, he noticed an abnormal bulge underneath the individual's clothing. Selflessly placing himself in front of one of the brigade commanders, Captain Groberg rushed forward, using his body to push the suspect away from the formation. Simultaneously, he ordered another member of the security detail to assist with removing the suspect. At this time, Captain Groberg confirmed the bulge was a suicide vest and with complete disregard for his life, Captain Groberg again with the assistance of the other member of the security detail, physically pushed the suicide bomber away from the formation. Upon falling, the suicide bomber detonated his explosive vest outside the perimeter of the formation, killing four members of the formation and wounding numerous others. The blast from the first suicide bomber caused the suicide vest of a previously unnoticed second suicide bomber to detonate prematurely with minimal impact on the formation. Captain Groberg's immediate actions to push the first suicide bomber away from the formation significantly minimized the impact of the coordinated suicide bombers' attack on the formation, saving the lives of his comrades and several senior leaders. Captain Groberg's extraordinary heroism and selflessness above and beyond the call of duty at the risk of life are in keeping with the highest traditions of military service and reflect credit upon himself, 4th Infantry Brigade Combat Team, 4th Infantry Division and the United States Army.

== Personal life ==
Groberg married Carsen Alexa Zarin in November 2018, who is originally from Saint Louis, Missouri and is of Jewish ancestry. Although a self-described lifelong Republican, he endorsed Hillary Clinton in the 2016 United States presidential election and spoke at the 2016 Democratic National Convention. He was featured in a 2025 official US Army social media post marking the anniversary of the suicide bomber attack as a "powerful story of courage, sacrifice, and heroism".

== Awards and decorations ==
Groberg has been awarded the following:

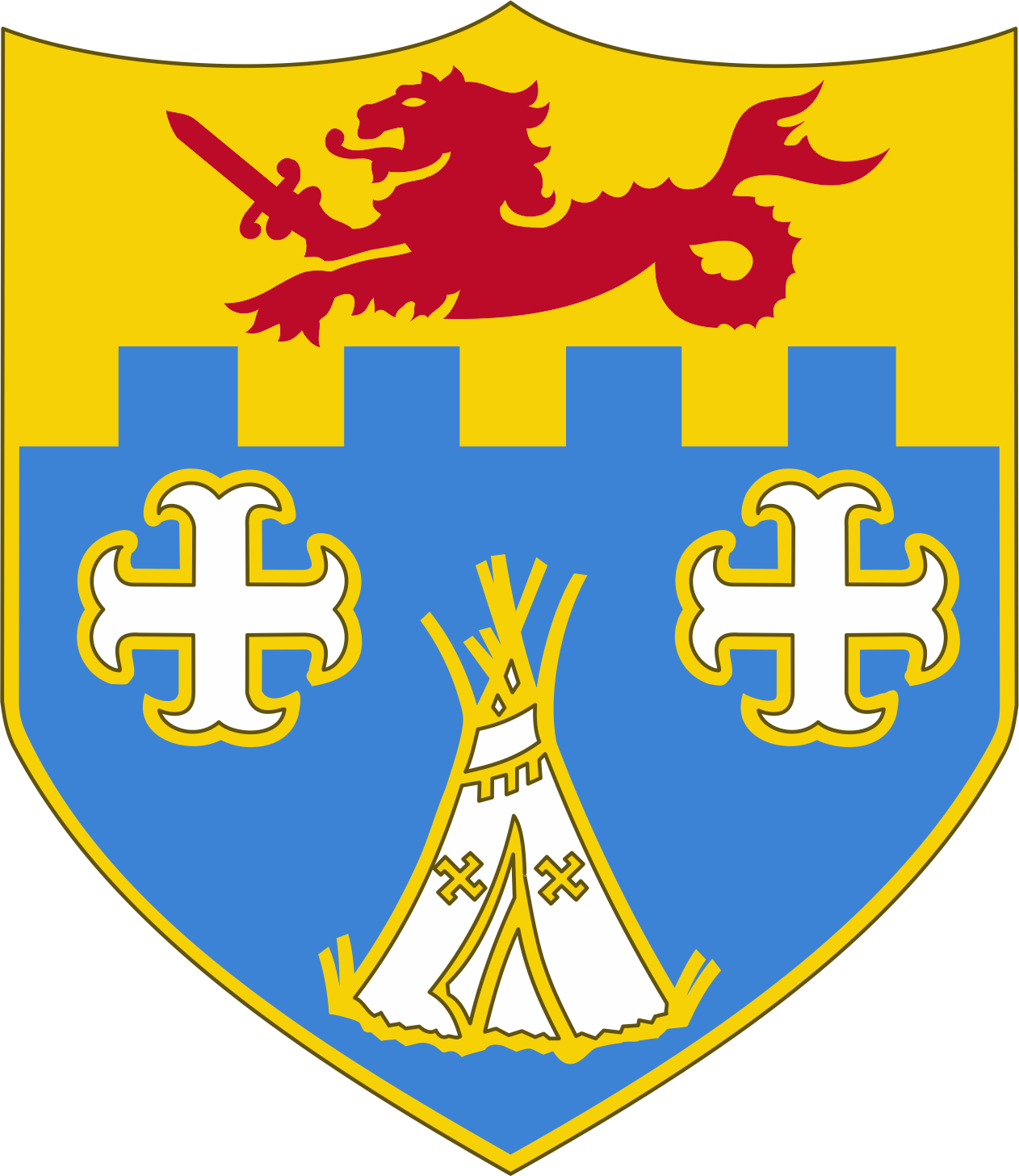

1st row	Combat Infantryman Badge		
2nd row	Medal of Honor	Bronze Star Medal with one bronze oak leaf cluster	Purple Heart
3rd row	Meritorious Service Medal	Army Commendation Medal	Army Achievement Medal with oak leaf cluster
4th row	National Defense Service Medal	Afghanistan Campaign Medal with three bronze campaign stars	Global War on Terrorism Service Medal
5th row	Army Service Ribbon	Army Overseas Service Ribbon with bronze award numeral 2	NATO Medal
6th row	Ranger Tab		Basic Parachutist Badge
7th row	12th Infantry Regiment Distinctive Unit Insignia		
8th row	Army Meritorious Unit Commendation		
9th row	4th Infantry Division CSIB		

- Captain Groberg has earned two Overseas Service Bars.

== See also ==
- List of post-Vietnam Medal of Honor recipients
- List of foreign-born Medal of Honor recipients
