= WNHI =

- Farmington, New Hampshire; United States
- Broadcast area: Seacoast–Lakes Region
- Frequency: 106.5 MHz
- Branding: Air1

Programming
- Language: English
- Format: Christian worship
- Network: Air1

Ownership
- Owner: Educational Media Foundation
- Sister stations: WAKC; WLKC; WPKC; WPKC-FM

History
- First air date: 1999
- Former call signs: WZEN (1998–2001); WMEX (2001–2008); WKHL (2008)
- Call sign meaning: New Hampshire

Technical information
- Licensing authority: FCC
- Facility ID: 86163
- Class: A
- ERP: 2,900 watts
- HAAT: 148 meters (486 ft)
- Transmitter coordinates: 43°24′1.2″N 71°9′25.2″W

Links
- Public license information: Public file; LMS
- Webcast: Listen live
- Website: www.air1.com

WNHI (106.5 FM) is a Christian worship formatted radio station. Licensed to Farmington, New Hampshire, the station's transmitter is located in New Durham. The station serves the Lakes and Seacoast Regions of New Hampshire, and is owned by Educational Media Foundation.

The station signed on in 1999 with a deep oldies format as WZEN, competing with WQSO. WZEN adopted the WMEX letters shortly after they were dropped by what is now WQOM (1060 AM) in 2001. The WMEX call letters, which were also used from 1985 until 1996 on what is now WWDJ (1150 AM) in Boston and on WEXP in Westport, New York, from 1996 until 1999, refer to a popular top-40 station of the 1960s and 1970s on 1510 AM in Boston (which has since reclaimed the WMEX call sign).

On January 28, 2008, AllAccess.com reported that the station was in the process of being sold to the Educational Media Foundation for $1 million.

On June 2, 2008, the station went out with the Righteous Brothers' "Rock n Roll Heaven" as its last tune. While the station changed its call letters to WKHL, implying that it would join K-LOVE, the station ended up joining sister network Air 1 instead. A few weeks later, the call sign was again changed, this time to the current WNHI.
