= WWSF =

Oldies radio station in Sanford, Maine

- Sanford, Maine; United States
- Broadcast area: York County, Maine
- Frequency: 1220 kHz
- Branding: 104.3 The Goat

Programming
- Format: Classic hits
- Affiliations: Sanford Mainers

Ownership
- Owner: Port Broadcasting LLC

History
- First air date: November 9, 1957 (as WSME)
- Former call signs: WSME (1957–1999); WPHX (1999–2012)
- Call sign meaning: "Sanford"

Technical information
- Licensing authority: FCC
- Facility ID: 74068
- Class: D
- Power: 1,000 watts day; 234 watts night
- Transmitter coordinates: 43°25′53.3″N 70°45′42.2″W
- Translator: 104.3 W282CS (Sanford)

Links
- Public license information: Public file; LMS
- Webcast: Listen live
- Website: seacoastoldies.com

WWSF (1220 AM, "104.3 The Goat") is a radio station airing a classic hits format. Established in 1957 as WSME, the station is licensed to serve Sanford, Maine, United States. WWSF is owned by Port Broadcasting.

== History ==
WWSF signed on as WSME on November 9, 1957. Its original studio was located on lower School Street in Sanford. The call letters were changed to WPHX after being purchased by Phoenix Media/Communications Group in 1999. The station was silent as its transmitter failed in 2010, but returned to the air in June 2011.

"Legends" logo on 102.3 translator

The station was acquired by Port Broadcasting, which also owned WNBP in Newburyport, Massachusetts, in 2012. When the sale was completed, the call letters were changed to WWSF. WWSF's "Legends" format was identical to that of WNBP, though the two stations were programmed separately. On January 1, 2013, WWSF shifted its format from adult standards to oldies. Port Broadcasting purchased FM translator W272CG to rebroadcast WWSF; the FM signal was launched in September 2013. In February 2019 Port Broadcasting sold W272CG to Maine Public, which used the translator to rebroadcast its statewide classical music format. In April 2019 WWSF ceased broadcasting on 102.3 and started broadcasting on 104.3 on its new translator.

WWSF's "Legends" programming was merged with the "Seacoast Oldies" programming of former sister stations WXEX and WXEX-FM, using the "Seacoast Oldies" branding, on July 24, 2023; the combined format retains WWSF's local news and sports programming, as well as some songs that had previously only been part of WWSF's playlist. The rebranding followed the sale of WXEX and WXEX-FM to the Educational Media Foundation to become K-Love stations WPKC and WPKC-FM.

On July 1, 2026, WWSF changed its format from oldies to classic hits and rebranded as "104.3 The Goat", adding songs from the 1990s and 2000s.

== Translator ==
Broadcast translator for WWSF
Call sign	Frequency	City of license	FID	ERP (W)	Class	Transmitter coordinates	FCC info
W282CS	104.3 FM	Sanford, Maine	201465	250	D	43°25′11″N 70°48′9″W	LMS
