= ZNS-2 =

Radio station

- Nassau; Bahamas
- Broadcast area: The Bahamas
- Frequency: 107.9 MHz
- Branding: Inspiration 107.9 FM

Programming
- Format: Religious music
- Affiliations: BBC World Service

Ownership
- Owner: The Broadcasting Corporation of The Bahamas
- Sister stations: ZNS-1; ZNS-3; ZNS-3-FM; ZNS-TV

History
- First air date: 1962; 64 years ago (on AM)
- Call sign meaning: Zephyr Nassau Sunshine

Technical information
- Facility ID: 102870
- Class: A (NARBA clear-channel station) (previous I-B station)
- Power: 54,000 watts (FM); 1,000 watts (AM)
- Transmitter coordinates: 25.04675°N 77.31765°W (FM); 25.0458°N 77.3182°W (AM)
- Repeaters: 1240 ZNS-2; C6B-2 6.09 MHz (SW)

Links
- Website: Official website

ZNS-2 (branded as Inspiration 107.9) is the second-oldest radio station in the Bahamas, having begun broadcasting in 1962. It is under ownership of the Broadcasting Corporation of The Bahamas.

ZNS-2 broadcasts on the AM band on 1240 kHz with a power of 1 kW. In the 1990s, the station also began broadcasting on the FM band on 107.9 MHz with a power of 10 kW.
