= WPKC (AM) =

Simulcast of WPKC-FM, Sanford, Maine
- Exeter, New Hampshire; United States
- Broadcast area: Seacoast Region; Southern Maine
- Frequency: 1540 kHz

Programming
- Format: Contemporary Christian
- Network: K-Love

Ownership
- Owner: Educational Media Foundation
- Sister stations: WNHI; WPKC-FM

History
- First air date: June 4, 1966
- Former call signs: WKXR (1966–1982); WMYF (1982–1998); WGIP (1998–2009); WXEX (2009–2023)

Technical information
- Licensing authority: FCC
- Facility ID: 53386
- Class: D
- Power: 5,000 watts day
- Transmitter coordinates: 42°59′23.64″N 70°56′10.4″W
- Translators: 97.1 W246BP (Exeter); 101.5 W268DO (Chester)

Links
- Public license information: Public file; LMS
- Webcast: Listen live
- Website: www.klove.com

WPKC (1540 kHz) is an AM radio station licensed to Exeter, New Hampshire, and covering the New Hampshire Seacoast region and Southern Maine. The station's format is contemporary Christian music, supplied from the K-Love network. The station's license is held by the Educational Media Foundation. The station simulcasts its sister station, 92.1 WPKC-FM in Sanford, Maine. In addition, WPKC operates two FM translators: W246BP (97.1 MHz) in Exeter, and W298CU (101.5) in Chester.

AM 1540 is a clear-channel frequency reserved for Class A stations KXEL in Waterloo, Iowa, and ZNS-1 in Nassau, Bahamas. WPKC broadcasts at 5,000 watts during the daytime hours only.

== History ==
The AM 1540 frequency in Exeter went on the air on June 4, 1966, as WKXR. It was owned by Frank Estes, who also owned WKXL in Concord, New Hampshire. Estes sold the station in 1978, and on March 10, 1982, the station was renamed WMYF. The call sign stood for "Music of Your Life", a syndicated adult standards format.

In 1998, Capstar acquired WMYF from CBS Radio. (CBS had obtained the station after its purchase of American Radio Systems.) The station began to simulcast the news/talk format of WGIR, a sister station in Manchester, New Hampshire; a call sign change to WGIP followed on October 2. The WMYF call sign would later be moved down the AM dial to 1380 AM, which would retain it until that station's closure in 2015.

Capstar and Chancellor Media announced in August 1998 that they would merge (Hicks, Muse, Tate & Furst was a major shareholder in both companies); upon the merger's completion in July 1999, the combined company was named AMFM Inc. AMFM was in turn acquired by Clear Channel Communications in a deal announced on October 4, 1999, and completed in August 2000.

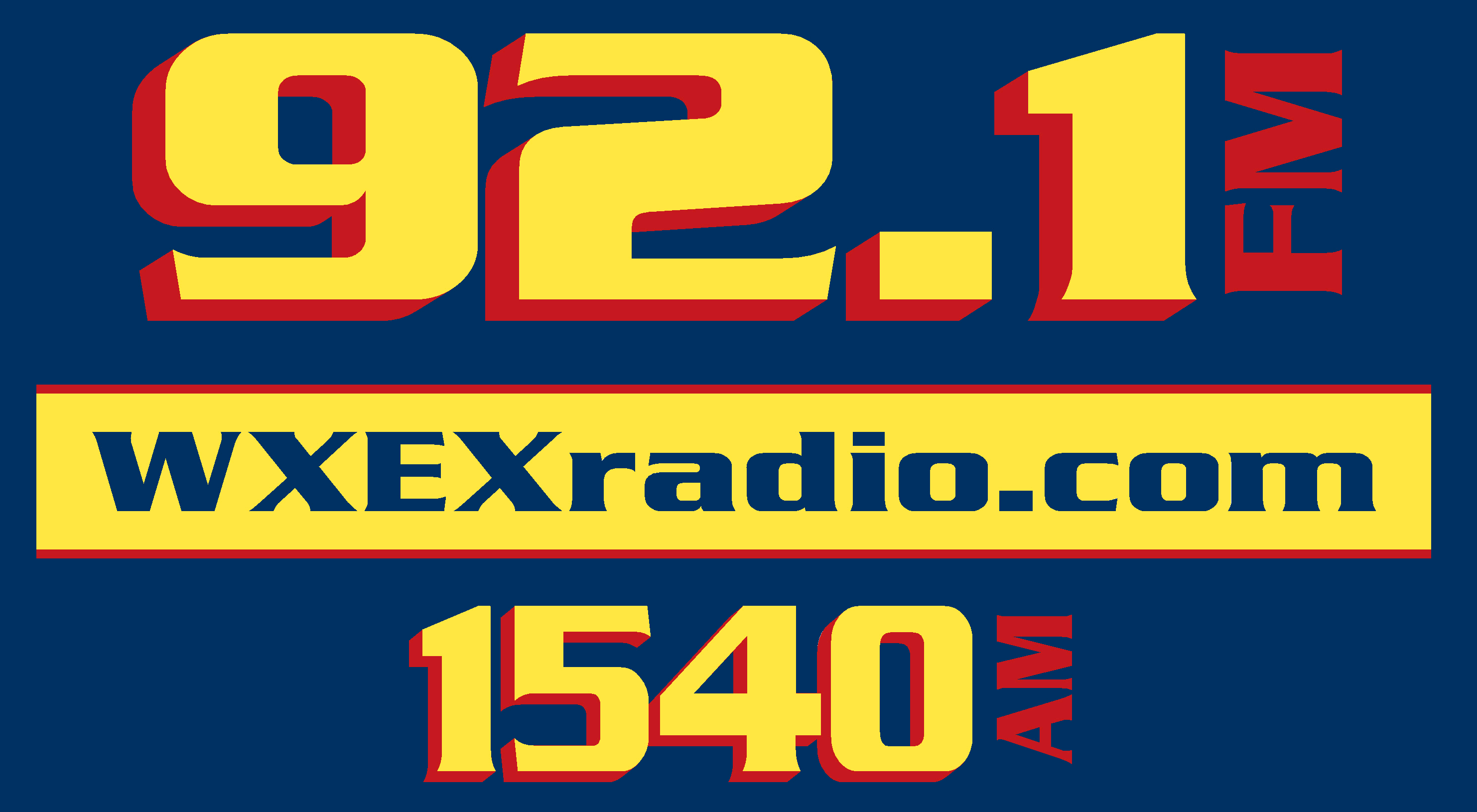
Logo used from August 11, 2011, through August 20, 2015

After WGIP was placed into the Aloha Station Trust in 2008 as a result of the privatization of Clear Channel (now iHeartMedia, Inc.), the station was sold to Aruba Capital Holdings, LLC in 2009. After Aruba closed on the sale on March 9, 2009, the call sign was changed to WXEX and the WGIR simulcast was discontinued. WXEX relaunched with an oldies format on March 16, 2009. On August 11, 2011, the station began simulcasting with 92.1 WXEX-FM in Sanford, Maine, which Aruba had acquired earlier in the year.

On April 14, 2015, WXEX owner Aruba Capital Holdings LLC entered into a local marketing agreement (LMA) with WNBP/WWSF owner Port Broadcasting LLC whereby the latter assumed operational control of WXEX and WXEX-FM. On August 20, 2015, WXEX and its FM sister station shifted their format from classic hits to classic rock, branded as "Classic Rock 92.1"; the move was made to distinguish WXEX from WWSF's oldies format. Effective January 31, 2017, Aruba Capital sold WXEX, WXEX-FM, and W246BP to LMA partner Port Broadcasting. In return, Aruba Capital received a 26.9 percent stake in Port Broadcasting, giving Aruba Capital principal Andrew Hartmann a controlling interest in the new licensee.

During Labor Day Weekend in 2018, WXEX and WXEX-FM stunted with a broadcast of the Drake-Chenault documentary The History of Rock and Roll. On September 3, 2018, the stations changed to an oldies format, branded as Seacoast Oldies, in effect reversing the 2015 format change.

Port Broadcasting agreed to sell WXEX, WXEX-FM, and translators W246BP and W298CU to the Educational Media Foundation (EMF) for $690,000 in April 2023. EMF already operated Air1 station WNHI in Farmington, with its K-Love network only available via stations in surrounding markets. Following the sale's completion on July 24, 2023, the "Seacoast Oldies" programming moved to WWSF on July 24, 2023, and WXEX joined K-Love; the station's call sign was changed to WPKC on August 1, 2023.

== Translators ==
Broadcast translators for WPKC
| Call sign | Frequency | City of license | FID | ERP (W) | Class | Transmitter coordinates | FCC info |
|---|---|---|---|---|---|---|---|
| W246BP | 97.1 FM | Exeter, New Hampshire | 150134 | 250 | D | 43°1′38.3″N 70°52′49.1″W | LMS |
| W268DO | 101.5 FM | Chester, New Hampshire | 201489 | 250 | D | 42°57′47.8″N 71°17′21.3″W | LMS |
