= Francine Lacqua =

British journalist (born 1978)

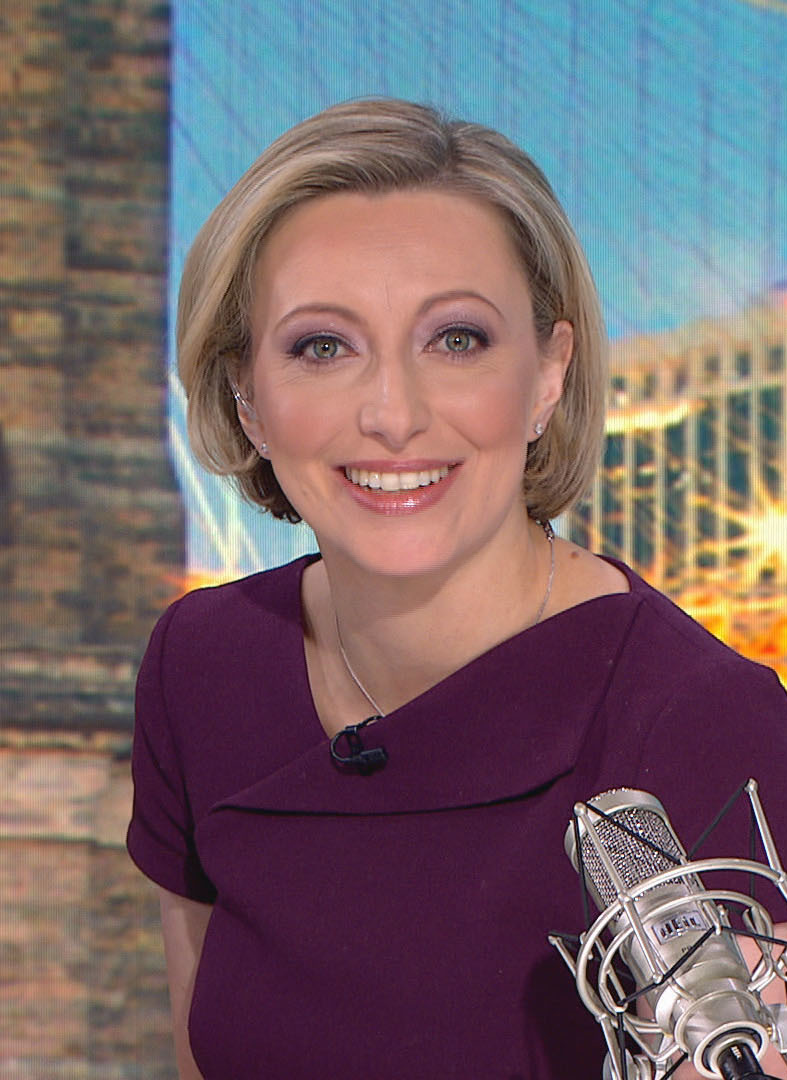
- Born: 15 December 1978 (age 47); Italy
- Education: Paris 1 Panthéon-Sorbonne University; King's College London
- Occupations: News anchor & Editor-at-large
- Television: The Pulse with Francine Lacqua Leaders with Lacqua
- Awards: AIB Media Awards: Television Personality of the Year (2013) Knight of the Order of the Star of Italy (2018) Premio Bancor 2024: Journalism (2024)

Francine Lacqua (born 15 December 1978) is an Italian journalist, television anchor and editor-at-large for Bloomberg Television. She anchors "The Pulse with Francine Lacqua" every weekday from 0900-1000, and features program "Leaders with Lacqua" where she interviews top leaders in business, politics and finance. Lacqua is fluent in English, Italian and French.

== Early life ==
Lacqua was born in Italy of Italian parents. While she was growing-up, her father was posted in Russia, the United States, and the United Kingdom. He covered the Cold War and was a political expert.

As a result, she lived in Moscow from the age of 1 until the age of 6, in Washington, D.C., from the age of 6 to 15, where she studied at the Lycée français Rochambeau, and thereafter in London at the Lycée français Charles de Gaulle until she went to Paris for her studies in 1998.

== Education ==
She was accepted on the double-degree in English and French law at King's College London and Paris I Panthéon-Sorbonne University. She graduated with an LLB in English law and Maitrise en droit.

== Career ==
Lacqua joined Bloomberg as an intern in the summer of 2000, initially working for French television, based in London, UK. Later that year she was offered a permanent position with French Television, working as a producer. In 2001 she began to present news output in French.

In 2003 she moved to Bloomberg's UK television output, where she began to appear as a reporter, covering OPEC meetings, meetings of the European Finance Ministers, G7, and World Economic Forum meetings (including their annual meeting in Davos, Switzerland). During this time she also carried out in depth interviews with Mark Mobius, George Soros, Christine Lagarde, Warren Buffett, and Jean-Claude Trichet.

In 2004 she was one of the last foreign journalists to interview the then Lebanese Prime Minister, Rafic Hariri. He was assassinated in the same spot where the interview took place a year later.

In 2008, she increasingly appeared as a news-anchor and, in 2010 began to present On the Move with Francine Lacqua until 2014, which was broadcast, to Europe, Asia and the United States. In 2011 she conceived a new interview-show called Eye to Eye which involved her interviewing a well-known personality in a pod in the London Eye. She interviewed, amongst others, Sir Philip Green, Margherita Missoni, Paul Smith, Christian Louboutin, Bianca Jagger and Sir Martin Sorrell.

In 2012, she presented City Central with Guy Johnson. Both anchors moved to The Pulse in 2013. Following Eye to Eye, Lacqua also hosted Leader's Lunch in 2013, which was replaced by Leaders with Lacqua shortly afterwards.

On 5 October 2015 Lacqua became co-anchor of Bloomberg Surveillance in London alongside Tom Keene in New York.

From 2023, Lacqua began hosting her weekday namesake show The Pulse with Francine Lacqua from London.

== Awards ==
In 2012, she was part of the Bloomberg team that won the OPEC award for 'Public Interest Reporting'

In 2013, she was the winner of Television Personality of the Year awarded by the Association of International Broadcasters.

On 3 May 2018 Lacqua received the Knighthood of the Order of the Star of Italy (Cavaliere dell’Ordine della Stella d’Italia). The award was given and presented by Raffaele Trombetta, Italian Ambassador, on behalf of the president of Italy, at the Italian embassy in London.
