= ZNS-3 =

Radio station

ZNS-3 / C6B-3

Freeport; Bahamas
- Broadcast area: The Bahamas
- Frequency: 810 kHz
- Branding: The Light (Northern Service)

Programming
- Language: English
- Format: Contemporary Christian music

Ownership
- Owner: The Broadcasting Corporation of The Bahamas
- Sister stations: ZNS-1; ZNS-2; ZNS-3-FM; ZNS-TV

History
- First air date: 1973
- Call sign meaning: "Zephyr Nassau Sunshine"

Technical information
- Power: 10,000 watts
- Transmitter coordinates: 25°2′44.1″N 77°19′5.8″W

Links
- Webcast: Listen Live
- Website: Official website

ZNS-3 (branded as The Light or the Northern Service) is the third-oldest radio station in the Bahamas, having begun broadcasting in 1973. It is under ownership of the Broadcasting Corporation of The Bahamas. ZNS-3 broadcasts at 810 kHz on the AM band using a 10 kW transmitter and also broadcasts at 104.5 MHz on the FM band using a 10 kW transmitter.

The Bahamas' ITU prefix is officially C6-, though it still uses its older ZN- prefix for most of its AM/FM radio and television stations from when it was a colony of the United Kingdom, though has listed ZNS-3's call sign as C6B-3 in the past, similar to its other non-broadcast signals.
