= Michael McKee (broadcaster) =

American journalist

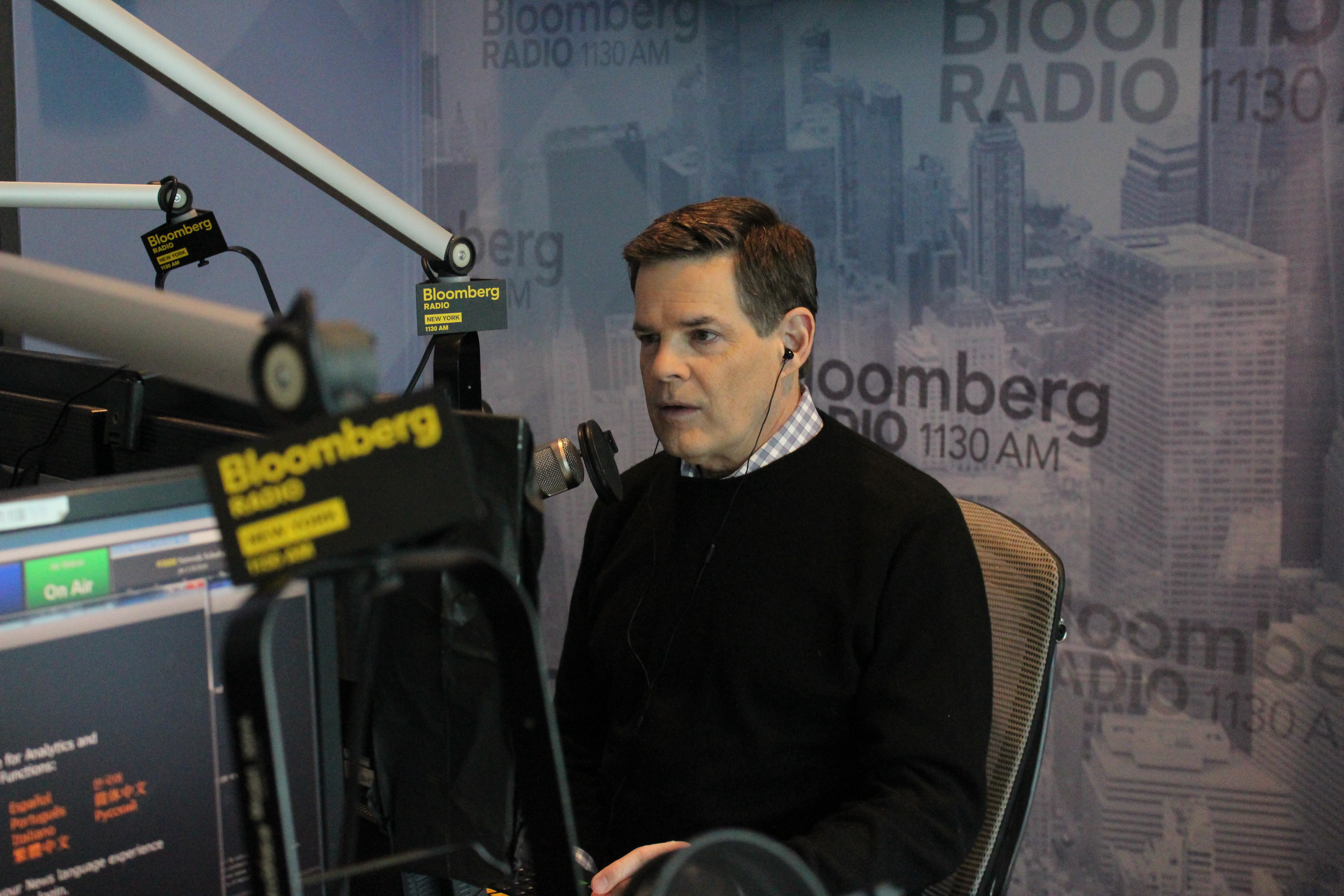
- Born: August 10, 1955 (age 70)
- Occupation: Radio/TV Journalist
- Title: Bloomberg International Economics and Policy Correspondent

Michael Stuart McKee (born August 10, 1955) is the International Economics and Policy Correspondent for Bloomberg TV and Radio.

== Background ==
McKee was born in Greenwich, CT. He graduated from Colorado State University and did graduate work in economics at Johns Hopkins University. He is the grandson of Joseph V. McKee, a former New York state assemblyman who served as acting Mayor of New York City.

== Career ==
McKee joined Newsweek in 1980. He was hired by Conus Communications' All News Channel in 1984 and served as its congressional correspondent and later its White House correspondent during the presidencies of Ronald Reagan and George H.W. Bush. He began working at Bloomberg News in 1994 as White House correspondent during the Bill Clinton administration.

In 2004, he was named economics editor for Bloomberg's radio and TV networks, and anchor of Bloomberg TV's Money & Politics program. In 2010 he co-anchored Bloomberg's Morning News show with Vonnie Quinn. At Bloomberg News, McKee has also covered Congress, the Federal Reserve and the Treasury Department, and has written for Bloomberg Markets, Bloomberg Businessweek, and Bloomberg.com. He has reported from more than 60 countries on six continents, and is a regular at many international economic gatherings, including meetings of the G-7, the World Bank and IMF, APEC, and the World Economic Forum in Davos, Switzerland.

On September 11, 2001, McKee was at the World Trade Center when it was attacked, reporting from the scene until the towers fell.

From 2013 to 2016, he was co-host of Bloomberg Surveillance (with Tom Keene), conducting interviews and providing analysis of current financial and political news and economic trends. The broadcast is heard in New York City on WBBR 1130, Boston WXKS 1200, San Francisco KNEW 960, Washington WDCH-FM 99.1 and across North America on SiriusXM Radio satellite channel 119. Since 2016, McKee has been Bloomberg Television and Radio's International Economics & Policy correspondent, reporting on economics; trade; central banks and finance ministries, and political developments around the world.
