= WYTH =

- Madison, Georgia; United States
- Broadcast area: Atlanta DMA
- Frequency: 1250 kHz

Programming
- Format: Traditional and urban contemporary gospel

Ownership
- Owner: Debra Baker and Livingston Fulton; (Agape Life Ministries, Inc.)
- Sister stations: WKVQ 1540 Eatonton, GA

History
- First air date: 1955

Technical information
- Licensing authority: FCC
- Facility ID: 9884
- Class: D
- Power: 1,000 watts day 79 watts night
- Transmitter coordinates: 33°32′53.00″N 83°28′35.00″W

Links
- Public license information: Public file; LMS
- Webcast: None
- Website: None

WYTH (1250 AM) is a Christian radio station broadcasting a traditional and urban contemporary gospel format. Licensed to Madison, Georgia, United States, the station is currently owned by Debra Baker and Livingston Fulton, through licensee Agape Life Ministries, Inc. WYTH is a sister station to WKVQ 1540 AM in Eatonton, Georgia, but does not simulcast.
