= ZNS-3-FM =

- Freeport, Bahamas; Bahamas
- Broadcast area: The Bahamas
- Frequency: 104.5 kHz
- Branding: Power 104.5 (Northern Service)

Programming
- Format: urban adult contemporary

Ownership
- Owner: The Broadcasting Corporation of The Bahamas
- Sister stations: ZNS-1; ZNS-2; ZNS-3; ZNS-TV

History
- Call sign meaning: Zephyr Nassau Sunshine

Technical information
- Power: 10,000 watts
- Transmitter coordinates: 26°32′N 78°39′W

Links
- Webcast: Listen Live
- Website: Official website

ZNS-3-FM (branded as Power 104.5) is a radio station in the Bahamas, having begun broadcasting as an FM repeater of ZNS-3, at the time the "Northern Service", before separating and adopting its current music format. It is under ownership of the Broadcasting Corporation of The Bahamas.
