= KGMR =

- Clarksville, Arkansas; United States
- Frequency: 1360 kHz
- Branding: Radio La Raza

Programming
- Format: Regional Mexican

Ownership
- Owner: Jose Carlos Moron; (Radio La Raza, LLC)

History
- Former call signs: KLYR (1956–2023)

Technical information
- Licensing authority: FCC
- Facility ID: 22056
- Class: D
- Power: 500 watts day 98 watts night
- Transmitter coordinates: 35°28′21″N 93°29′29″W

Links
- Public license information: Public file; LMS
- Website: radiolaraza.com

KGMR (1360 AM) is a radio station licensed to Clarksville, Arkansas, United States. The station airs a Regional Mexican format, and is currently owned by Jose Carlos Moron, through licensee Radio La Raza, LLC.
