= WJJT =

Radio station in Jellico, Tennessee

- Jellico, Tennessee; United States
- Frequency: 1540 kHz

Programming
- Format: Gospel
- Affiliations: Salem Radio Network

Ownership
- Owner: Southeast Broadcast Corporation

Technical information
- Licensing authority: FCC
- Facility ID: 68132
- Class: D
- Power: 1,000 watts day 500 watts critical hours 1 watt night
- Transmitter coordinates: 36°34′59.00″N 84°8′10.00″W
- Translators: W290DN (105.9 MHz, Jellico)

Links
- Public license information: Public file; LMS
- Webcast: Listen live
- Website: wjjtradio.com

WJJT (1540 AM) is a radio station broadcasting a Gospel music format. Licensed to Jellico, Tennessee, United States, the station is currently owned by Southeast Broadcast Corporation and features programming from Salem Radio Network.
