= WTXY =

Radio station in Whiteville, North Carolina

- Whiteville, North Carolina; United States
- Broadcast area: Whiteville, North Carolina
- Frequency: 1540 kHz
- Branding: Rock Classics 103.9

Programming
- Format: Classic hits
- Affiliations: North Carolina News Network

Ownership
- Owner: Jeffrey Allen Jones and Glasgow Hicks III; (Audiotraxx Media Partners LLC)

History
- First air date: 1976 (as WOOZ)
- Former call signs: WOOZ (1976–1979)

Technical information
- Licensing authority: FCC
- Facility ID: 62232
- Class: D
- Power: 1,000 watts day
- Transmitter coordinates: 34°19′23.00″N 78°42′47.00″W
- Translator: 103.9 W280FO (Whiteville)

Links
- Public license information: Public file; LMS
- Webcast: Listen live
- Website: wtxyradio.com

WTXY (1540 AM) is a daytime-only radio station broadcasting a classic hits music format, with local news, sports and community information. Licensed to Whiteville, North Carolina, United States, the station, along with translator W280FO (103.9 FM), is owned by Jeffrey Allen Jones and Glasgow Hicks III, through licensee Audiotraxx Media Partners LLC.

== History ==
WTXY's first license was granted to original owner Greg Singletary (Waccamaw Broadcasting Co.) on November 17, 1978, with the call letters WOOZ. The station changed its call letters on December 31, 1979, to WTXY. The radio station was sold to Tom Stanley (Stanley Broadcasting, Inc.) in 1980, who served the community until he sold it to Jeff Millikin (Millikin Broadcasting) on March 14, 2007. The station was immediately put up for sale and purchased by Rob Kendall and Jason Dozier (WTXY Radio, LLC) on August 6, 2008. The station was granted the license to begin simulcasting on the 250-watt 103.9FM W280FO on July 16, 2018. Audiotraxx Media Partners purchased the station from WTXY Radio, LLC on August 1, 2019.

The station carries Whiteville High School Football and Baseball coverage in Columbus County.

On August 1, 2019, WTXY changed their format from soft adult contemporary to classic hits, branded as "Kool 103.9".
