= WBNL =

Coordinates: 38°03′58″N 87°16′27″W

- Boonville, Indiana; United States
- Frequency: 1540 kHz
- Branding: AM 1540

Programming
- Format: Easy listening

Ownership
- Owner: Turpen Communications, LLC

History
- First air date: 1950
- Call sign meaning: W BooNviLle

Technical information
- Licensing authority: FCC
- Facility ID: 6425
- Class: D
- Power: 250 watts (day); 1 watt (night)
- Translator: 99.9 W249BP (Boonville)

Links
- Public license information: Public file; LMS
- Webcast: Listen Live
- Website: radio1540.net

WBNL (1540 AM) is a radio station licensed to Boonville, Indiana. The station is owned by Ralph Turpen, who purchased WBNL in 2001.

WBNL, which was founded by Jack Sanders and Norman Hall, went on the air in 1950. With an effective radiated power of 250 watts during daytime hours, the station can be heard in all or part of 20 surrounding counties, as far west as southeastern Illinois, and as far south as western Kentucky. At night, however, the station can only be heard in the immediate Boonville area as the station's power is reduced to 1 watt per FCC regulations.

The station has the distinction of being Indiana's first Chicago Cubs radio affiliate. In the late 1950s, Norman Hall went to Chicago and presented the Cubs with thousands of signatures from listeners — doubtless diehard Cubs fans — who wanted to hear Cubs games on WBNL. Cubs games have been broadcast on WBNL to listeners in southwestern Indiana ever since.

By the late 1960s, Sanders and Hall were ready to try their hand at FM, and built a 3,000 watt station broadcasting at 107.1 on the FM dial. WBNL-FM would later be sold to South Central Communications, which now operates the station under the call letters WJPS.

After nearly 60 years on the air, WBNL continues to serve the Boonville and Warrick County community, with mostly locally based programming and high school sporting events. According to the station's website, Turpen is working to bring another FM station to Boonville as a sister station to WBNL.
