= WMSJ =

- Freeport, Maine; United States
- Broadcast area: Portland, Maine
- Frequency: 89.3 MHz

Programming
- Format: Contemporary Christian music
- Network: K-Love

Ownership
- Owner: Educational Media Foundation

History
- First air date: November 29, 1997

Technical information
- Licensing authority: FCC
- Facility ID: 17483
- Class: B
- ERP: 14,000 watts
- HAAT: 186 meters (610 ft)
- Transmitter coordinates: 43.763°N 70.324°W
- Translator: 99.9 W260AS (Lawrence, Massachusetts)

Links
- Public license information: Public file; LMS
- Webcast: Listen live
- Website: klove.com

WMSJ (89.3 FM) is a noncommercial educational radio station licensed to Freeport, Maine, United States, and serving the Portland area. Owned by the Educational Media Foundation, it features contemporary Christian music as part of the K-Love network. WMSJ's programming is also heard on a translator in Lawrence, Massachusetts, W260AS (99.9 FM).

== History ==
The 89.3 FM facility signed on November 29, 1997. WMSJ's programming had originated in July 1993 on 91.9 FM in Harpswell; after 89.3 went on the air, the 91.9 frequency was sold to the Bible Broadcasting Network and became WYFP. Originally known as "Joy 89.3," the station rebranded to "Positive 89.3" in July 2005. W260AS in Lawrence signed on in February 2008.

By September 2010, the station's owner, The Positive Radio Network, shared several board members with Bethesda Christian Broadcasting, another operator of religious radio stations; the following year, WMSJ was transferred to Bethesda. In January 2015, Bethesda Christian Broadcasting reached a deal to sell WMSJ to Educational Media Foundation; the sale closed on June 10, 2015, at a purchase price of $925,000, at which point the station joined EMF's K-Love network.

== Previous logo ==
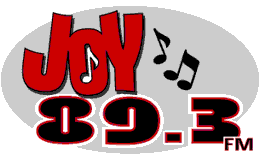
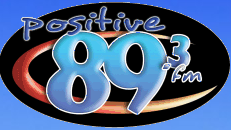
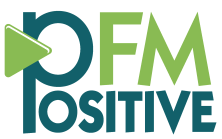
