= WKVQ =

- Eatonton, Georgia; United States
- Frequency: 1540 kHz

Programming
- Format: Christian talk and teaching

Ownership
- Owner: Resurrection House Ministries; (Rev Leonard Small)

History
- First air date: April 6, 1967
- Former call signs: WXPQ (1967–1986); WDBS (1986–1989)

Technical information
- Licensing authority: FCC
- Facility ID: 16668
- Class: D
- Power: 10,000 watts day 1,600 watts critical hours
- Transmitter coordinates: 33°19′19.00″N 83°25′3.00″W

Links
- Public license information: Public file; LMS
- Webcast: None
- Website: None

WKVQ (1540 AM) is a Christian radio station broadcasting a Christian talk and teaching format. Licensed to Eatonton, Georgia, United States, the station is currently owned by Resurrection House Ministries, through licensee Rev Leonard Small. WKVQ is a sister station to WYTH 1250 AM in Madison, Georgia, but does not simulcast.

== History ==
The station went on the air as WXPQ on April 6, 1967. It changed calls to WDBS on January 8, 1986. On October 12, 1989, the station changed its call sign to the current WKVQ.
