= ZNS-TV =

Television broadcaster in The Bahamas

- Nassau–Freeport; Bahamas
- Channels: Digital: 13 (VHF) (both stations)
- Branding: ZNS Network HD

Programming
- Affiliations: Independent (branded as ZNS Network)

Ownership
- Owner: The Broadcasting Corporation of The Bahamas
- Sister stations: ZNS-1 AM/FM, ZNS-2 AM/FM, ZNS-3 AM/SW, ZNS-3-FM, ZNS News Channel

History
- Founded: 1936 (radio); July 4, 1977 (television)
- Former names: ZNS Network (1936––2024)
- Former affiliations: CBS/NBC/ABC (all secondary, 1977–1992)
- Call sign meaning: Zephyr (balmy breeze) Nassau Sunshine

Technical information
- Licensing authority: Utilities Regulation and Competition Authority (URCA)
- ERP: 54 kW

Links
- Website: znsbahamas.com

ZNS-TV (Zephyr Nassau Sunshine) is a national television broadcaster operated by the state-owned Broadcasting Corporation of The Bahamas (BCB). ZNS-TV's two transmitters, serving Nassau and Freeport, are the only over-the-air TV stations in the country. The rest of the country receives these channels (and a privately owned station) via Cable Bahamas, a privately held company that maintained an exclusive licence to operate cable TV services until 2009.

BCB also owns ZNS-1 AM radio 1540 (a clear-channel station), its repeater, ZNS-1 on 104.5, ZNS-2 AM 1240, 107.9 "Inspiration 107.9 FM" in Nassau, and ZNS-3 AM 810 / FM 104.5 "Power 104.5" in Freeport.

== History ==
Older ZNS-TV logo, with variant colors

ZNS radio was founded in 1937 to broadcast hurricane warnings to the islands throughout the archipelago. At its inception, the station broadcast for two hours a day, featuring news and musical recordings from the BBC and Nassau sources. The radio station eventually established another transmitter in Freeport on the island of Grand Bahama.

ZNS-TV launched in Nassau on New Providence Island in 1977. Before ZNS-TV is launched, television can be received from stations in the United States. Color broadcasting started in 1983, The station aired programming to entertain, educate and inform. It aired sitcoms, sports, dramas, and even movies. In 1992, the station started to air only public affairs programming.

In October 2010, the BCB implemented a major restructuring exercise in which approximately 80 employees were made redundant. This event sparked much public debate. The government offered a severance package to employees who separated from the company. One reason for restructuring was that the previous governments had declared the BCB to be a major strain on the public purse, bringing in little revenue. The further reason for the downsizing was to enable the corporation's transition to a public broadcasting service.

The people behind the changes were then Minister of National Security with Responsibilities for Broadcasting, Hon. Tommy Turnquest, and the chairman of BCB, Michael Moss, along with his board and managers. Payouts were reported to cost the government around $4 million. Many of those who received separation packages and termination letters generally were unhappy, because it did not reflect their years of service. However, the government maintained that the separation package was generous, considering the economic climate in the country and that they were greater than required by law. In addition to the monetary payouts, those affected were provided with health insurance for 12 months.

On 14 December 2011, ZNS-TV announced that it was planning on converting to ATSC digital terrestrial television, with the additional capability of adding a mobile DTV feed.

In 2017, ZNS-TV shut down its on-channel repeater in Freeport, ZNS-TV-1 (also using VHF 13), and substantially reduced power at its remaining transmitter in Nassau.

== Technical information ==
=== Subchannels ===
The station's signal is multiplexed:

Subchannels of ZNS-TV
Channel	Res.	Short name	Programming
13.1	1080i	ZNS-HD	ZNS Network
13.2	480i	PARL	ZNS Parliamentary Channel
13.3	480i	COM	ZNS Community

== See also ==
- Television in the Bahamas
- List of the Caribbean television channels
- Gippie's Kingdom
