= WBRY =

- Woodbury, Tennessee; United States
- Frequency: 1540 kHz

Programming
- Format: country music
- Affiliations: Citadel Broadcasting

Ownership
- Owner: Volunteer Broadcasting, LLC

History
- Call sign meaning: WoodBuRY

Technical information
- Licensing authority: FCC
- Facility ID: 15530
- Class: D
- Power: 500 watts (day)
- Transmitter coordinates: 35°49′53.00″N 86°6′42.00″W

Links
- Public license information: Public file; LMS
- Website: wbry.com

WBRY (1540 AM) is a radio station broadcasting a country music format. Licensed to Woodbury, Tennessee, United States, the station is owned by Volunteer Broadcasting, LLC and features programming from Citadel Broadcasting.

== Translators ==
WBRY programming is also carried on a broadcast translator station to extend or improve the coverage area of the primary station.

Call sign	Frequency	City of license	FID	ERP (W)	Class	FCC info
W299DD	(107.7 FM) FM	Woodbury, Tennessee	139937	10	D	LMS
