= WDCK (FM) =

Radio station licensed to Bloomfield, IN, US

Coordinates: 39.089°N 86.740°W

- Bloomfield, Indiana; United States
- Broadcast area: Bloomington, Indiana
- Frequency: 101.1 MHz
- Branding: K-101 Country Classics

Programming
- Format: Classic country

Ownership
- Owner: Mid-America Radio Group, Inc.

History
- First air date: 2013
- Former call signs: WMYJ (2013–2016)

Technical information
- Licensing authority: FCC
- Facility ID: 87626
- Class: A
- ERP: 3800 watts
- HAAT: 128 meters (420 ft)

Links
- Public license information: Public file; LMS

WDCK (101.1 FM) is a radio station licensed to Bloomfield, Indiana, United States. The station airs a Classic country format and is currently owned by Mid-America Radio Group, Inc.

The station sign-on as WMYJ moved to 101.1. On November 21, 2016, 101.1 FM swap call letters with 88.9 FM, while WMYJ-FM moved back to 88.9 FM, the station began stunting with Christmas music. In January 2017 the station flipped to classic country format as K-101.
