= Bloomberg Radio =

Business news radio network

- Type: Radio network
- Branding: Bloomberg Radio
- Country: United States
- First air date: January 4, 1993
- Availability: Nationwide, see § Affiliates
- Headquarters: New York, New York
- Area: Worldwide
- Owner: Bloomberg L.P.
- Parent: Bloomberg Communications Inc.
- Webcast: Listen live
- Official website: www.bloombergradio.com

Bloomberg Radio is a radio service of American company Bloomberg L.P. that provides global business news programming 24 hours a day. The format is general local, national and international news reports along with financial market updates and interviews with corporate executives, economists and industry analysts. On off hours, local stations may supply local sports play-by-play coverage such as college basketball, tennis and other sports coverage.

Bloomberg Radio is broadcast on radio stations around the United States, and directly operates four radio stations:

- WBBR (1130 AM) in New York City.
- WBOS (92.9 FM) in Brookline–Boston and WNBP (1450 AM) in Newburyport.
- WDCH-FM (99.1) in Bowie, Maryland, serving Washington, D.C., and Baltimore.

In 1992, Bloomberg purchased the first of these, WBBR (1130 AM) in New York (at the time using the call sign WNEW), for $13.5 million. Bloomberg took over the operation of WXKS (1200 AM) in Newton, Massachusetts (serving Boston), on March 1, 2013. The following year, Bloomberg began programming KNEW (960 AM) in Oakland, California (serving the San Francisco Bay Area), on September 29, 2014. Both stations were owned and operated by iHeartMedia, but were programmed by Bloomberg Radio under a local marketing agreement (LMA). On December 21, 2015, Bloomberg Radio launched a similar arrangement on CBS Radio-owned WNEW-FM (99.1), its first FM radio station. The call letters of WNEW-FM were later changed to WDCH-FM and the station is now owned by Audacy, Inc.

On July 4, 2017, Bloomberg moved its programming in Boston to WRCA (1330 AM), owned by Beasley Broadcast Group. Later that year, it fully acquired WNBP (1450 AM) in Newburyport to serve as a simulcast of WRCA. Both WRCA and WNBP operate translator stations on 106.1 FM. Bloomberg's LMA with WXKS expired on March 1, 2018. On September 3, 2024, Bloomberg Radio moved in Boston from WRCA to another Beasley-owned station, WBOS (92.9 FM); that station's HD2 channel had already simulcast Bloomberg programming from WRCA. The LMA with KNEW expired on September 30, 2024, and was not renewed.

Bloomberg Radio is also heard nationally on SiriusXM satellite radio channel 119. Select programming is also broadcast in London UK on DAB digital radio via the London 3 multiplex (VHF block 11B), with simulcasts of the Bloomberg TV audio at other times.

== Programming ==
The original Bloomberg Radio news format divided each hour of the day into three 20-minute segments, each of which contained stock market updates, business headlines, traffic, weather, local news/sports, a human interest piece or a general update about cultural happenings. However, by 2010, Bloomberg Radio had shifted from a headline service to a discussion-based format in order to offer more in-depth market and economic analysis. Bloomberg Radio is the world's only global business radio service. Bloomberg Daybreak Asia broadcasts live from New York and Hong Kong, Sunday through Thursday 6:00 p.m. to 10:00 p.m. ET (morning drive time in Asian time zones.) It is then followed by Bloomberg Daybreak Europe, originating from London, on Monday to Friday 1:00 a.m. to 5:00 a.m. ET (morning drive time GMT). Finally, Bloomberg Daybreak Americas is live until 7:00 a.m. ET from New York, Boston, Washington DC and San Francisco. Through these programs, Bloomberg Radio offers a start to the business day globally, via the Bloomberg Radio+ Mobile App and via its live stream on Bloomberg.com and the Bloomberg Terminal. During each day, the network broadcasts over 20 live interviews with economists, market analysts, and other influential newsmakers on shows such as Bloomberg Surveillance with Tom Keene and Michael McKee which airs weekday mornings from 7 a.m. to 10 a.m. ET.

=== Programs ===
- Bloomberg Daybreak Asia with Bryan Curtis, David Ingles, Yvonne Man and Doug Krizner
- Bloomberg Daybreak Europe with Caroline Hepker, Stephen Carroll, Anna Edwards and Tom Mackenzie
- Bloomberg UK Politics
- Bloomberg Daybreak Americas with Karen Moskow and Nathan Hager
- Bloomberg Surveillance with Tom Keene and Jonathan Ferro
- Bloomberg Markets with Paul Sweeney and Lisa Abramowicz
- Bloomberg Businessweek with Carol Massar
- Bloomberg Daybreak Americas
- Bloomberg This Weekend
- Bloomberg Best with June Grasso and Ed Baxter
- Bloomberg Style It Out with Emma Willis, Tom Mackenzie and Mark Radang
- This Week with George Stephanopoulos
- Face the Nation
- Meet the Press
- Fox News Sunday

Live-to-tape programming

- Bloomberg Daybreak Weekend
- Bloomberg Best
- Masters in Business with Barry Ritholtz
- Bloomberg Business of Sports with Michael Barr
- Bloomberg Law and Bloomberg Opinion with June Grasso

== Affiliates ==
Bloomberg Radio's 24/7 programming is syndicated by Key Networks to local radio stations across the country.

The Bloomberg Radio Network is also the leading provider of short-form business news reports to radio stations around the country. The network provides live, custom business reports to major all-news radio stations including WINS in New York City. The network provides "Bloomberg Money Minute" reports at :20 and :50 past the hour. It also provides daily specialty reports including the "Small Business Report", the "Business of Sports Report", the "Bloomberg Pursuits Report on Luxury", the "Real Estate Report", the "Green Business Report, and the "Black Business Report".

Since April 30, 2018, Bloomberg Radio content has been syndicated in Canada by Bloomberg's local partner Bell Media Radio. The company operated two business news stations branded as BNN Bloomberg Radio, which featured audio simulcasts of programs from Bell's BNN Bloomberg cable network, and other Bloomberg Radio programs. CFTE (1410 AM) in Vancouver was the first Canadian station to carry the format. It was joined in 2021 by CKOC (1150 AM) in Hamilton, Ontario. CFTE was closed by Bell Media Radio in June 2023; while CKOC was sold and dropped Bloomberg programming in August 2024.

These lists may not be complete.

=== Full time affiliates ===
The following stations carry the Bloomberg Radio Network all day long.

Call sign	Frequency	City of license	Broadcast area	Station owner	Notes
WBOS	92.9 FM	Brookline, Massachusetts	Greater Boston	Beasley Broadcast Group	(Note: Programmed by Bloomberg, L.P., under a local marketing agreement.)
WDCH-FM	99.1 FM	Bowie, Maryland	Washington–Baltimore metropolitan area	Audacy, Inc.	
WJZ-FM-HD2	105.7 FM HD2	Catonsville, Maryland	Baltimore metropolitan area	Audacy, Inc.	(Note: Simulcast of WDCH-FM.)
KONO-FM-HD2	101.1 FM HD2	Helotes, Texas	San Antonio metropolitan area	Cox Media Group	(Note: Simulcast of KONO.)
WNBP	1450 AM	Newburyport, Massachusetts	Greater Boston	Bloomberg, L.P.	(Note: Simulcast of WBOS.)
WBBR	1130 AM	New York, New York	New York metropolitan area	Bloomberg, L.P.	
KONO	860 AM	San Antonio, Texas	San Antonio metropolitan area	Cox Media Group	

=== Part time affiliates ===
The following stations carry select Bloomberg full-length programs.

Call sign	Frequency	City of license	Broadcast area	Station owner	Notes
WPSE	1450 AM	Erie, Pennsylvania	Erie metropolitan area	Penn State Erie, The Behrend College	
KYCR	1440 AM	Golden Valley, Minnesota	Twin Cities	Salem Media Group	
K287BX	105.3 FM	Mesa, Arizona	Phoenix metropolitan area	CRC Broadcasting	(Note: Simulcast of KFNN.)
KFNN	1510 AM	Mesa, Arizona	Phoenix metropolitan area	CRC Broadcasting	
KDOW	1220 AM	Palo Alto, California	San Francisco Bay Area	Salem Media Group	

=== Short form reports ===
The following stations carry Bloomberg's short-form business reports.

Call sign	Frequency	City of license	Broadcast area	Station owner	Notes
WGY-FM	103.1 FM	Albany, New York	Capital District	iHeartMedia	(Note: Simulcast of WGY.)
KJCE	1370 AM	Austin, Texas	Greater Austin	Audacy, Inc.	
KWON	1400 AM	Bartlesville, Oklahoma	Tulsa metropolitan area	KCD Enterprises, Inc.	
WBZ	1030 AM	Boston, Massachusetts	Greater Boston	iHeartMedia	
K231AA	94.1 FM	Boulder, Colorado	Denver metropolitan area	iHeartMedia	(Note: Simulcast of KOA.)
WTLP	103.9 FM	Braddock Heights, Maryland	Washington metropolitan area	Hubbard Broadcasting	(Note: Simulcast of WTOP-FM.)
WBBM	780 AM	Chicago, Illinois	Chicago metropolitan area	Audacy, Inc.	
WCFS-FM	105.9 FM	Chicago, Illinois	Chicago metropolitan area	Audacy, Inc.	(Note: Simulcast of WBBM.)
WLW	700 AM	Cincinnati, Ohio	Cincinnati metropolitan area	iHeartMedia	
WTAM	1100 AM	Cleveland, Ohio	Greater Cleveland	iHeartMedia	
WTVN	610 AM	Columbus, Ohio	Columbus metropolitan area	iHeartMedia	
KRLD	1080 AM	Dallas, Texas	Dallas–Fort Worth metroplex	Audacy, Inc.	
KOA	850 AM	Denver, Colorado	Denver metropolitan area	iHeartMedia	
WWJ	950 AM	Detroit, Michigan	Metro Detroit	Audacy, Inc.	
KTSM	690 AM	El Paso, Texas	El Paso–Juárez	iHeartMedia	
K231BQ	94.1 FM	Golden, Colorado	Denver metropolitan area	iHeartMedia	(Note: Simulcast of KOA.)
WTIC	1080 AM	Hartford, Connecticut	Greater Hartford	Audacy, Inc.	
KTRH	740 AM	Houston, Texas	Greater Houston	iHeartMedia	
WPHI-FM	103.9 FM	Jenkintown, Pennsylvania	Philadelphia metropolitan area	Audacy, Inc.	(Note: Simulcast of KYW.)
WTKK	106.1 FM	Knightdale, North Carolina	Raleigh–Durham	iHeartMedia	
WHAS	840 AM	Louisville, Kentucky	Louisville metropolitan area	iHeartMedia	
KNX	1070 AM	Los Angeles, California	Greater Los Angeles	Audacy, Inc.	
KNX-FM	97.1 FM	Los Angeles, California	Greater Los Angeles	Audacy, Inc.	(Note: Simulcast of KNX.)
WWWT-FM	107.7 FM	Manassas, Virginia	Washington metropolitan area	Hubbard Broadcasting	(Note: Simulcast of WTOP-FM.)
WIOD	610 AM	Miami, Florida	Miami metropolitan area	iHeartMedia	
WINS	1010 AM	New York, New York	New York metropolitan area	Audacy, Inc.	
KXNT	840 AM	North Las Vegas, Nevada	Las Vegas Valley	Audacy, Inc.	
KFAB	1110 AM	Omaha, Nebraska	Omaha–Council Bluffs	iHeartMedia	
W273CA	102.5 FM	Orlando, Florida	Greater Orlando	Central Florida Educational Foundation, Inc.	(Note: Simulcast of WFLF.)
KYW	1060 AM	Philadelphia, Pennsylvania	Philadelphia metropolitan area	Audacy, Inc.	
WPHT	1210 AM	Philadelphia, Pennsylvania	Philadelphia metropolitan area	Audacy, Inc.	
WFLF	540 AM	Pine Hills, Florida	Greater Orlando	iHeartMedia	
KFBK-FM	93.1 FM	Pollock Pines, California	Sacramento metropolitan area	iHeartMedia	(Note: Simulcast of KFBK.)
WRVA	1140 AM	Richmond, Virginia	Greater Richmond	Audacy, Inc.	
WHAM	1180 AM	Rochester, New York	Rochester metropolitan area	iHeartMedia	
KFBK	1530 AM	Sacramento, California	Sacramento metropolitan area	iHeartMedia	
WOAI	1200 AM	San Antonio, Texas	Greater San Antonio	iHeartMedia	
KOGO	600 AM	San Diego, California	San Diego–Tijuana	iHeartMedia	
KCBS	740 AM	San Francisco, California	San Francisco Bay Area	Audacy, Inc.	
KFRC-FM	106.9 FM	San Francisco, California	San Francisco Bay Area	Audacy, Inc.	(Note: Simulcast of KCBS.)
WGY	810 AM	Schenectady, New York	Capital Region	iHeartMedia	
KMOX	1120 AM	St. Louis, Missouri	Greater St. Louis	Audacy, Inc.	
WFLA	970 AM	Tampa, Florida	Tampa Bay Area	iHeartMedia	
WTOP-FM	103.5 FM	Washington, D.C.	Washington metropolitan area	Hubbard Broadcasting	
