= WOGR-FM =

Salisbury, North Carolina; United States
- Frequency: 93.3 MHz
- Branding: Wordnet 93.3

Programming
- Format: Urban gospel
- Affiliations: Salem Radio Network

Ownership
- Owner: Victory Christian Center, Inc.
- Sister stations: WOGR, WGAS

History
- First air date: February 1, 1977
- Former call signs: WNDN-FM (1977–1996)

Technical information
- Licensing authority: FCC
- Facility ID: 48451
- Class: D
- ERP: 10 watts
- HAAT: 55 meters (180 ft)
- Transmitter coordinates: 35°40′0.00″N 80°28′13.00″W

Links
- Public license information: Public file; LMS
- Website: wordnet.org

WOGR-FM (93.3 MHz) is a radio station in Salisbury, North Carolina. The station has an urban gospel radio format with some Christian talk and teaching programs. It is owned by Victory Christian Center, Inc. Programming is simulcast on WOGR (1540 AM) Charlotte, WGAS (1420 AM) in South Gastonia and FM translator W202BW (88.3 MHz) in Harrisburg.

== History ==
The station was originally launched in 1977 as WNDN-FM, the college radio station of Catawba College in Salisbury. It was subsequently acquired by Victory Christian Center in 1996 to expand the broadcast area of 1540 WOGR in Charlotte.

Former logo
