= KDYN-FM =

- Coal Hill, Arkansas; United States
- Broadcast area: Fort Smith, Arkansas; Clarksville, Arkansas
- Frequency: 92.7 MHz
- Branding: True Country 92.7

Programming
- Format: Country music

Ownership
- Owner: Ozark Communications, Inc.

Technical information
- Licensing authority: FCC
- Facility ID: 164130
- Class: C3
- ERP: 12,500 watts
- HAAT: 144 meters (472 ft)

Links
- Public license information: Public file; LMS
- Webcast: Listen live
- Website: kdyn.com

KDYN-FM (92.7 FM) is a radio station licensed to Coal Hill, Arkansas. The station broadcasts a country music format and is owned by Ozark Communications, Inc.
