= WMYJ (AM) =

- Martinsville, Indiana; United States
- Frequency: 1540 kHz

Programming
- Format: Adult contemporary
- Affiliations: Salem Communications' Solid Gospel format

Ownership
- Owner: Mid-America Radio Group

History
- Former call signs: WMCB (1982–2005); WSKT (2005–2005)

Technical information
- Licensing authority: FCC
- Facility ID: 57356
- Class: D
- Power: 500 watts day 250 watts critical hours
- Transmitter coordinates: 39°24′31.00″N 86°25′10.00″W
- Repeaters: (98.9 MHz) W255DD (Mooresville); W263CH 100.5 MHz FM

Links
- Public license information: Public file; LMS
- Website: https://www.wcbk.com/wmyj-1005.html

WMYJ (1540 AM) is a radio station licensed to Martinsville, Indiana, United States. The station is owned by Mid-America Radio Group and broadcasts an Adult contemporary format.

== History ==
The station went on the air as WMCB on August 23, 1982. On October 23, 2005, the station changed its call sign to WSKT, and on November 29, 2005, to the current WMYJ.

According to filings with the FCC, the station transmitter site was flooded by 8½ feet of water in June 2008, and FCC granted approval to suspend operations pending replacement of equipment. The station returned to the air in September 2008, and shortly afterward added 24-hour FM service via a translator at 94.1 FM, formerly a local relay for the K-Love network.

The station now airs an adult contemporary format.
