= KLYR (AM) =

- Ozark, Arkansas; United States
- Frequency: 1540 kHz

Programming
- Format: Country

Ownership
- Owner: Ozark Communications

History
- First air date: 1975
- Former call signs: KZRK (1968–1985); KDYN (1985–2023)

Technical information
- Licensing authority: FCC
- Facility ID: 51097
- Class: D
- Power: 500 watts day 1 watt night
- Transmitter coordinates: 35°29′16″N 93°48′43″W

Links
- Public license information: Public file; LMS

KLYR (1540 AM) is a radio station broadcasting a country music format. Licensed to serve Ozark, Arkansas, United States, the station is currently owned by Ozark Communications.
