= WNBP =

Bloomberg Radio station in Newburyport–Boston, Massachusetts

Satellite of WBOS, Brookline
- Newburyport, Massachusetts; United States
- Broadcast area: Greater Boston
- Frequency: 1450 kHz

Programming
- Format: Business news
- Affiliations: Bloomberg Radio

Ownership
- Owner: Bloomberg, L.P.; (Bloomberg Radio Newburyport LLC)

History
- First air date: March 10, 1958
- Former call signs: WNBP (1957–1982); WCEA (1982–1987); WNCG (1987–1991)
- Former frequencies: 1470 kHz (1957–1982)
- Call sign meaning: Newburyport

Technical information
- Licensing authority: FCC
- Facility ID: 15338
- Class: C
- Power: 1,000 watts (unlimited)
- Transmitter coordinates: 42°49′23.33″N 70°51′40.19″W
- Translators: 106.1 W291CC (Haverhill); 92.1 W221EE (Topsfield)

Links
- Public license information: Public file; LMS
- Webcast: Listen live (via iHeartRadio)
- Website: www.bloombergradio.com

WNBP (1450 AM) is a commercial radio station licensed to Newburyport, Massachusetts, United States, and serving the Greater Boston radio market. The station is owned by Bloomberg L.P. and serves as a simulcast of Bloomberg-programmed WBOS (92.9 FM) in Brookline, Massachusetts. WNBP and WBOS carry financial news from Bloomberg Radio.

WNBP has a power of 1,000 watts. Its transmitter is located off Ferry Road in Salisbury, Massachusetts. The station's programming is simulcast on two FM translators, W291CC (106.1 MHz), transmitting from Haverhill, and W221EE (92.1 MHz) in Topsfield.

== History ==
On March 10, 1958, WNBP signed on the air as a 500 watt daytime only station at 1470 AM, owned by Puritan Broadcasting of Lynn, Massachusetts. The call sign represented Newburyport. Puritan also owned WLYN (1360 AM) and WLYN-FM 101.7, as well as stations in Brattleboro, Vermont, and Nashua, New Hampshire.

Through the late 1970s, 1980s, and 1990s, the station changed hands several times. In 1982 the station moved to 1450 kHz, added nighttime operation and changed call letters to WCEA. In 1987 it was purchased by longtime WBZ newscaster Ted Larsen and Dan Friel for $195,000. They changed the call sign to WNCG, representing "Newburyport, The Coast and Gloucester, Your Coastal Home Companion". In 1989 they sold the station to New Hampshire broadcaster Win Damon for $425,000. He changed the call sign back to WNBP in 1991.

In 1998, Damon sold the station to Radio Newburyport LLC, owned by Robert "Doc" Fuller for $225,000. Fuller, along with partner J.J. Jeffrey, owned several other stations under their company name Fuller-Jeffrey Broadcasting. WNBP was a sole venture of Fuller with his longtime friend Al Mozier as general manager. Although J.J. Jeffrey was not part of the ownership, his voice was used for all the recorded imaging and promotional announcements. Many improvements to the station were made by Fuller and Mozier including purchasing all new studio equipment, Audisk and later Air-Traffic-Control automation, new BE-1 transmitter and installing a new tower and ground system at the transmitter site on Ferry Road in Salisbury, Massachusetts.

In September 2004, Radio Newburyport announced a deal had been reached to sell WNBP to Westport Communications LP (Todd Tanger, managing member) for a reported sale price of $500,000. The deal was brokered by Frank Boyle of Frank Boyle and Associates. At the time of the sale, Westport Communications owned only one other station, WBOQ (104.9 FM). WNBP's studios were relocated to nearby Beverly, Massachusetts, but the station still focused its local news and community coverage on the greater Newburyport area.

In March 2009, WNBP was sold by Westport Communications to Port Broadcasting, LLC, owned by Carl Strube, Peter Falconi and Robert Couture. The station began broadcasting from new downtown Newburyport studios at 6 Federal Street on March 13. The format remained the same. On January 1, 2013, WNBP shifted its format from adult standards to oldies. Among WNBP's air staff were former WBOQ disc jockey Jacky Ankeles as well as Jeff Lawrence.

On July 28, 2017, Port Broadcasting agreed to sell WNBP and W291CC to Bloomberg L.P. for $1 million; Bloomberg began operating the station under a local programming and marketing agreement on August 1. The station began to simulcast Bloomberg Radio programming with WRCA (1330 AM); that station also operates a translator at 106.1 MHz, which is required to limit its signal to the northeast of Boston to protect W291CC. As a result of the sale, WNBP's staff was let go. The sale was completed on November 28, 2017.

== Translators ==
Broadcast translators for WNBP
Call sign	Frequency	City of license	FID	ERP (W)	Class	Transmitter coordinates	FCC info
W291CC	106.1 FM	Haverhill, Massachusetts	150780	225	D	42°46′23.3″N 71°5′59.2″W	LMS
W221EE	92.1 FM	Topsfield, Massachusetts	201495	250	D	42°38′27.3″N 70°56′27.2″W	LMS
