= WMYJ-FM =

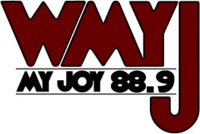
- Oolitic, Indiana; United States
- Broadcast area: Bloomington, Indiana
- Frequency: 88.9 MHz
- Branding: My Joy 88.9

Programming
- Format: Southern Gospel

Ownership
- Owner: Spirit Educational Radio

History
- Former call signs: WXVW (2002–2005); WMYJ (2005); WMYJ-FM (2005–2013); WDCK (2013–2016)

Technical information
- Licensing authority: FCC
- Facility ID: 92257
- Class: A
- ERP: 5,200 watts
- HAAT: 78 meters (256 ft)
- Transmitter coordinates: 38°59′14.00″N 86°27′31.00″W

Links
- Public license information: Public file; LMS

WMYJ-FM (88.9 FM) is a radio station licensed to Oolitic, Indiana, United States, and serving the Bloomington area. The station is currently owned by Spirit Educational Radio and broadcasts a Southern gospel format.

== History ==
The station was assigned the call sign WXVW on September 30, 2002. On July 14, 2005, the station changed its call sign to WMYJ; on November 29, 2005, to WMYJ-FM; on December 2, 2013, to WDCK; and on November 21, 2016, back to WMYJ-FM.

On November 21, 2016, WDCK changed their call letters to WMYJ-FM and changed their format to southern gospel, branded as "My Joy 88.9" (calls and format moved from 101.1 FM Bloomfield, IN, which took the WDCK calls and began stunting with Christmas music.)
