= South Gastonia, North Carolina =

- Neighborhood
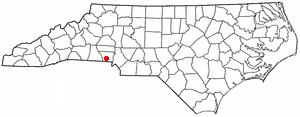
- Location of South Gastonia, North Carolina
- Coordinates: 35°13′3″N 81°12′17″W
- Country: United States
- State: North Carolina
- County: Gaston

Area
  - Total: 6.4 sq mi (16.7 km^{2})
  - Land: 6.4 sq mi (16.7 km^{2})
  - Water: 0 sq mi (0.0 km^{2})
- Elevation: 768 ft (234 m)

Population (2000)
  - Total: 5,433
  - Density: 845/sq mi (326.1/km^{2})
- Time zone: UTC-5 (Eastern (EST))
  - Summer (DST): UTC-4 (EDT)
- ZIP code: 28052
- Area code: 704
- FIPS code: 37-63180
- GNIS feature ID: 1022708

South Gastonia is a neighborhood of Gastonia in Gaston County, North Carolina, United States. The population was 5,433 at the 2000 census, at which time it was erroneously listed as a census-designated place. The majority of the community has now been annexed into the city of Gastonia and is now considered to be a neighborhood on the southside of Gastonia.

== Geography ==
South Gastonia is located at 35°13′03″N 81°12′17″W.

According to the United States Census Bureau, the CDP has a total area of 6.4 square miles (17 km^{2}), all land.

== Demographics ==
As of the census of 2000, there were 5,433 people, 2,061 households, and 1,543 families residing in the CDP. The population density was 844.5 inhabitants per square mile (326.1/km^{2}). There were 2,232 housing units at an average density of 347.0 per square mile (134.0/km^{2}). The racial makeup of the CDP was 84.87% White, 12.04% African American, 0.31% Native American, 0.63% Asian, 1.23% from other races, and 0.92% from two or more races. Hispanic or Latino of any race were 1.88% of the population.

There were 2,061 households, out of which 32.7% had children under the age of 18 living with them, 55.4% were married couples living together, 13.7% had a female householder with no husband present, and 25.1% were non-families. 19.7% of all households were made up of individuals, and 7.0% had someone living alone who was 65 years of age or older. The average household size was 2.64 and the average family size was 3.00.

In the CDP the population was spread out, with 24.9% under the age of 18, 8.6% from 18 to 24, 31.1% from 25 to 44, 24.7% from 45 to 64, and 10.8% who were 65 years of age or older. The median age was 36 years. For every 100 females, there were 97.0 males. For every 100 females age 18 and over, there were 95.1 males.

The median income for a household in the CDP was $38,898, and the median income for a family was $40,595. Males had a median income of $31,321 versus $22,285 for females. The per capita income for the CDP was $16,707. About 7.4% of families and 10.7% of the population were below the poverty line, including 18.5% of those under age 18 and 2.3% of those age 65 or over.
