= ZNS-1 =

- Nassau; Bahamas
- Broadcast area: The Bahamas
- Frequency: 1540 kHz
- Branding: Radio Bahamas

Programming
- Language: English
- Format: News–talk

Ownership
- Owner: The Broadcasting Corporation of The Bahamas
- Sister stations: ZNS-2; ZNS-3; ZNS-3-FM; ZNS-TV

History
- First air date: May 12, 1937; 89 years ago (AM); 1988; 38 years ago (FM)
- Call sign meaning: "Zephyr Nassau Sunshine"

Technical information
- Facility ID: 105377
- Class: A (NARBA clear-channel station) (previous I-B station)
- Power: 54,000 watts (AM); 5,000 watts (FM)
- Transmitter coordinates: 25°0′14.1″N 77°21′1.20″W (AM 1540); 25°2′48.7″N 77°19′2.65″W (FM 104.5); 26°32′N 78°39′W (FM 107.7)
- Repeaters: ZNS-1 104.5 MHz (Nassau); ZNS-1-FM 107.7 MHz (Freeport)

Links
- Website: Official website

ZNS-1 (branded as Radio Bahamas) is the oldest broadcast station in the Bahamas. It has a news–talk format, and broadcasts on 1540 kHz and 104.5 MHz in Nassau, with a repeater in Freeport on 107.7 MHz. It is under ownership of the Broadcasting Corporation of The Bahamas. The AM station has a Class A clear-channel allocation under NARBA and its nighttime signal can be heard throughout the Bahamas, most of Cuba, southeastern Florida and in the Yucatan Peninsula .

== History ==
The Broadcasting Corporation of The Bahamas (BCB) was created as a state-owned radio broadcast service in 1936, out of a primary concern of providing accurate hurricane warnings to all of the islands of the Bahamas. A callsign of ZNS (standing for "Zephyr Nassau Sunshine") was chosen and the first broadcast was held for the coronation of Britain's King George VI and his wife on May 12, 1937.

In the early days, ZNS broadcast for only two hours per day using a 500 watt transmitter. Programming included global news from the BBC, local news and musical recordings (from the BBC).

All programming from 1936 to 1950, was aired on a non-commercial basis by the colonial government. The station began commercial operation in August 1950, and since that time the station has functioned as a government-owned but commercially funded station.

== Today ==
Radio Bahamas (ZNS-1) operates from its premises on Third Terrace, Centreville, in Nassau (the station's home since 1959). Today programming is a mix of news, cultural affairs, and music, and is described as being "the national voice of the Bahamas".
