= 91.7 FM =

FM radio frequency

The following radio stations broadcast on FM frequency 91.7 MHz:

== Argentina ==
- CNN Radio Mendoza in Mendoza
- del parque in San Miguel de Tucumán, Tucumán
- Dipxero in Salta
- Espacio in Berazategui, Buenos Aires
- Estación sur in La Plata, Buenos Aires
- Estilo FM in Villa Gobernador Gálvez, Santa Fe
- Fiesta in Jujuy
- Horizonte in Rosario, Santa Fe
- KLA in Mar del Plata, Buenos Aires
- La Maja in Adrogué, Buenos Aires
- La primera in San Genaro, Santa Fe
- Logica in San Nicolás de los Arroyos, Buenos Aires
- LRL306 Urquiza in Buenos Aires
- LRP761 in Moisés Ville, Santa Fe
- La Uni in Los Polvorines, Buenos Aires
- Mega in Neuquén
- Naineck in Laguna Naineck, Formosa
- Nuestra in Luján, Buenos Aires
- Radio María in Coronel Suárez, Buenos Aires
- Radio María in Miramar, Buenos Aires
- Radio María in Puerto Madryn, Chubut
- Radio María in Esquel, Chubut
- Radio María in La Para, Córdoba
- Radio María in Obispo Trejo, Córdoba
- Radio María in Oliva, Córdoba
- Radio María in Paso de los libres, Corrientes
- Radio María in Pirané, Formosa
- Radio María in Puerto San Julián, Santa Cruz
- Radio María in Cipolletti, Río Negro
- Radio María in Tartagal, Salta
- Raices in Viedma, Río Negro
- Santa Cecilia in Ullum, San Juan
- Sport in Villa María, Córdoba
- RSO in Marcos Paz, Buenos Aires

== Australia ==
- 4ABCRR in Gold Coast, Queensland
- 7NT in Launceston, Tasmania
- 3PNN in Hamilton, Victoria
- 6MM in Mandurah, Western Australia

== Brazil ==
- Rádio Shalom (ZYV 848) in Fortaleza, Ceará

== Canada (Channel 219) ==
- CBAF-FM-21 in Bon Accord, New Brunswick
- CBBC-FM in Lethbridge, Alberta
- CBK-FM-3 in Yorkton, Saskatchewan
- CBKP-FM in Southend, Saskatchewan
- CBMB-FM in Sherbrooke, Quebec
- CBN-FM-5 in Marystown, Newfoundland and Labrador
- CBSI-FM-19 in Old Fort Bay, Quebec
- CBUJ-FM in Winlaw, British Columbia
- CBYC-FM in Canal Flats, British Columbia
- CBYF-FM in Chilliwack, British Columbia
- CFWE-FM-1 in Joussard, Alberta
- CHBN-FM in Edmonton, Alberta
- CHES-FM in Erin, Ontario
- CIBU-FM-1 in Bluewater, Ontario
- CICS-FM in Sudbury, Ontario
- CITT-FM in Saskatoon, Saskatchewan
- CIXL-FM in Welland, Ontario
- CKAY-FM in Gibsons, British Columbia
- VF2298 in Black Lake Reserve, Saskatchewan
- VF7121 in Petawawa, Ontario
- VF7146 in Alma, Quebec
- VOAR-3-FM in Lewisporte, Newfoundland and Labrador

== China ==
- CNR China Traffic Radio in Lanzhou and Urumqi
- CNR The Voice of China in Leshan, Suzhou (Anhui) and Tacheng Prefecture
- CRI News Radio in Chongqing

== Greece ==
- RSO 91.7 in Thessaloniki

== Honduras ==
- Inter 91.7 in San Pedro Sula, Honduras

== Indonesia ==
- Serumpun Radio in Batam and Singapore

== Japan ==
- Aomori Broadcasting Corporation
- Nankai Broadcasting

== Malaysia ==
- Nasional FM in Kuala Terengganu, Terengganu and Negeri Sembilan
- Suria in Taiping, Perak

== Mexico ==
- XHACT-FM in Actopan, Hidalgo
- XHBU-FM in Chihuahua, Chihuahua
- XHCCAX-FM in El Salto, Durango
- XHCIA-FM in Colima, Colima
- XHECU-FM in Los Mochis, Sinaloa
- XHEOQ-FM in Río Bravo, Tamaulipas
- XHESR-FM in Santa Rosalía, Baja California Sur
- XHGEM-FM in Toluca, Estado de México
- XHGLX-FM in Tijuana, Baja California
- XHIY-FM in Ríoverde, San Luis Potosí
- XHKH-FM in Querétaro, Querétaro
- XHMEC-FM in Amecameca, Estado de México
- XHOZ-FM in Xalapa, Veracruz
- XHPAS-FM in Mulegé, Baja California Sur
- XHPAV-FM in Pueblo Viejo, Veracruz
- XHPEAD-FM in Piedras Negras, Coahuila
- XHPHBP-FM in Huauchinango-Beristáin, Puebla
- XHPLH-FM in Pluma Hidalgo, Oaxaca
- XHQL-FM in Zamora, Michoacán
- XHRC-FM in Puebla, Puebla
- XHTEKA-FM in Juchitán, Oaxaca
- XHVA-FM in Villahermosa, Tabasco
- XHXL-FM in Monterrey, Nuevo León

== The Netherlands ==
- 90FM in Leersum
- NPO 3FM in the Netherlands in Rotterdam

== New Zealand ==
- The Edge (radio station) in Wellington

== Philippines ==
- DWCN in Tuguegarao City
- DWDG in Gumaca, Quezon
- DYRS in San Jose, Antique
- DYGB in Dumaguete City
- DYBG in Bogo, Cebu
- DXRG in Dipolog City
- DXJJ in Butuan City
- DXOM in Koronadal City

== United States (Channel 219) ==
- KALW in San Francisco, California
- KAPM in Alexandria, Louisiana
- KARG in Poteau, Oklahoma
- KAUK in Juneau, Alaska
- KAXE in Grand Rapids, Minnesota
- KBDO in Des Arc, Arkansas
- KBLD in Kennewick, Washington
- KBNJ in Corpus Christi, Texas
- KBSM in Mccall, Idaho
- KBSW in Twin Falls, Idaho
- KCCS in Starkville, Colorado
- KCHO (FM) in Chico, California
- KCOZ in Point Lookout, Missouri
- KCVO-FM in Camdenton, Missouri
- KCVS in Salina, Kansas
- KCVX in Salem, Missouri
- KDOV in Medford, Oregon
- KDUW in Douglas, Wyoming
- KEJA in Cale, Arkansas
- KEMC in Billings, Montana
- KEYR in Richfield, Utah
- KEYV in Vernal, Utah
- KFHL in Wasco, California
- KGCN (FM) in Roswell, New Mexico
- KGLP in Gallup, New Mexico
- KHBW in Brownwood, Texas
- KHCS in Palm Desert, California
- KHVU in Houston, Texas
- KIBH-FM in Seward, Alaska
- KICG in Perry, Iowa
- KJIR in Hannibal, Missouri
- KKEH in Ponderay, Idaho
- KKXT in Dallas, Texas
- KLAG in Alamogordo, New Mexico
- KLNR in Panaca, Nevada
- KLSP in Angola, Louisiana
- KLZR in Westcliffe, Colorado
- KMLL in Marysville, Kansas
- KMNO in Wailuku, Hawaii
- KMSL (FM) in Mansfield, Louisiana
- KMVC in Marshall, Missouri
- KNAD in Page, Arizona
- KNBX in San Ardo, California
- KNDW in Williston, North Dakota
- KNEO in Neosho, Missouri
- KNPS in Scobey, Montana
- KNSW in Worthington-Marshall, Minnesota
- KNWD in Natchitoches, Louisiana
- KOBH in Hobbs, New Mexico
- KOHS in Orem, Utah
- KOOP (FM) in Hornsby, Texas
- KOSU in Stillwater, Oklahoma
- KOTO (FM) in Telluride, Colorado
- KPBR (FM) in Poplar Bluff, Missouri
- KPCV (FM) in Portales, New Mexico
- KPCW in Park City, Utah
- KPHA in Mandan, North Dakota
- KPIT (FM) in Pittsburg, Texas
- KPNE in North Platte, Nebraska
- KPPD in Devils Lake, North Dakota
- KPUB in Flagstaff, Arizona
- KPWD in Lefors, Texas
- KQBI in Encinal, Texas
- KQOS in Albany, Texas
- KRFA in Moscow, Idaho
- KRKM in Fort Washakie, Wyoming
- KRMC in Douglas, Arizona
- KRTP in Alpine, Texas
- KRTU in San Antonio, Texas
- KSIF in Wellington, Texas
- KSQS in Ririe, Idaho
- KSSH in Shubert, Nebraska
- KSUI in Iowa City, Iowa
- KSVR in Mount Vernon, Washington
- KTDA in Dalhart, Texas
- KTGW in Fruitland, New Mexico
- KTPH (FM) in Tonopah, Nevada
- KTSG in Steamboat Springs, Colorado
- KUFR in Salt Lake City, Utah
- KUHM in Helena, Montana
- KUMW in Dillon, Montana
- KVAN-LP in Tucson, Arizona
- KVHL in Llano, Texas
- KVLD in Norfolk, Nebraska
- KVLP (FM) in Tucumcari, New Mexico
- KVRX in Austin, Texas
- KVTT in Dallas, Texas
- KXSR in Groveland, California
- KYAQ in Siletz, Oregon
- KYFQ in Tacoma, Washington
- KYOL in Chama, New Mexico
- KZAN in Hays, Kansas
- KZAZ (FM) in Bellingham, Washington
- KZSE in Rochester, Minnesota
- WAIV in Kingston, New York
- WAJS in Tupelo, Mississippi
- WAOY in Gulfport, Mississippi
- WAPB in Madison, Florida
- WAPD in Campbellsville, Kentucky
- WAVM in Maynard, Massachusetts
- WBGL in Champaign, Illinois
- WBJW in Albion, Illinois
- WBKU in Ahoskie, North Carolina
- WBMR in Telford, Pennsylvania
- WBQF in Fryeburg, Maine
- WBSL in Sheffield, Massachusetts
- WCCV (FM) in Cartersville, Georgia
- WCML in Alpena, Michigan
- WCOZ in New Albany, Pennsylvania
- WCUC-FM in Clarion, Pennsylvania
- WCUR in West Chester, Pennsylvania
- WDEQ in De Graff, Ohio
- WDKV in Fond du Lac, Wisconsin
- WDOZ in Pierson, Florida
- WEEM in Pendleton, Indiana
- WEGQ in Quogue, New York
- WEGS in Milton, Florida
- WEMC in Harrisonburg, Virginia
- WEQP in Rustburg, Virginia
- WETL in South Bend, Indiana
- WFCM in Murfreesboro, Tennessee
- WFFL in Panama City, Florida
- WGDH in Hardwick, Vermont
- WGLV in Woodstock, Vermont
- WHCP-FM in Trappe, Maryland
- WHRS in Cookeville, Tennessee
- WHUS in Storrs, Connecticut
- WICB in Ithaca, New York
- WIWC in Kokomo, Indiana
- WIXQ in Millersville, Pennsylvania
- WJAZ in Summerdale, Pennsylvania
- WJFH in Sebring, Florida
- WJIC in Zanesville, Ohio
- WJLF in Gainesville, Florida
- WJNF in Dalton, Massachusetts
- WJPR in Jasper, Indiana
- WJSI-LP in Wilmington, North Carolina
- WJVK in Owensboro, Kentucky
- WJWT in Gardner, Massachusetts
- WKDU in Philadelphia, Pennsylvania
- WLBS in Bristol, Pennsylvania
- WLFR in Pomona, New Jersey
- WLNJ in Lakehurst, New Jersey
- WLPE in Augusta, Georgia
- WLPG in Florence, South Carolina
- WMCN (FM) in Saint Paul, Minnesota
- WMCQ in Muskegon, Michigan
- WMKO in Marco, Florida
- WMPH in Wilmington, Delaware
- WMSE in Milwaukee, Wisconsin
- WMUH in Allentown, Pennsylvania
- WMVW in Peachtree City, Georgia
- WMWM in Salem, Massachusetts
- WNEC-FM in Henniker, New Hampshire
- WNEF in Newburyport, Massachusetts
- WNFC in Paducah, Kentucky
- WNJR in Washington, Pennsylvania
- WNLJ in Madisonville, Kentucky
- WNNV in San German, Puerto Rico
- WNNZ-FM in Deerfield, Massachusetts
- WOSR in Middletown, New York
- WOSV in Mansfield, Ohio
- WPCR in Plymouth, New Hampshire
- WPIL in Heflin, Alabama
- WPRL in Lorman, Mississippi
- WQQA in Forestville, Wisconsin
- WRAO in Wisconsin Rapids, Wisconsin
- WRLC (FM) in Williamsport, Pennsylvania
- WRNM in Ellsworth, Maine
- WRTX in Dover, Delaware
- WRVJ in Watertown, New York
- WRVX in Cameron, Missouri
- WSGE in Dallas, North Carolina
- WSHD in Eastport, Maine
- WSHS (FM) in Sheboygan, Wisconsin
- WSQC in Oneonta, New York
- WSQH in Forest, Mississippi
- WSUM in Madison, Wisconsin
- WSUW in Whitewater, Wisconsin
- WTJB in Columbus, Georgia
- WTRJ-FM in Orange Park, Florida
- WTYN (FM) in Lunenburg, Massachusetts
- WUGA in Athens, Georgia
- WUMG in Stow, Massachusetts
- WUMT in Marshfield, Massachusetts
- WUNV in Albany, Georgia
- WUOM in Ann Arbor, Michigan
- WVBY in Beckley, West Virginia
- WVIJ in Port Charlotte, Florida
- WVMU in Ashtabula, Ohio
- WVMW in Scranton, Pennsylvania
- WVNL in Vandalia, Illinois
- WVSD in Itta Bena, Mississippi
- WVXU in Cincinnati, Ohio
- WWET in Valdosta, Georgia
- WWFR in Stuart, Florida
- WWHR in Bowling Green, Kentucky
- WWJD in Pippa Passes, Kentucky
- WWJJ in Jasper, Florida
- WWPC in New Durham, New Hampshire
- WWVU in Morgantown, West Virginia
- WXCI in Danbury, Connecticut
- WXLB in Boonville, New York
- WXLL in Lake Placid, New York
- WXPR in Rhinelander, Wisconsin
- WYFD in Decatur, Alabama
- WYTN in Youngstown, Ohio
- WYXR in Memphis, Tennessee
- WZCA in Quebradillas, Puerto Rico
- WZJR in Portland, Indiana
- WZKL in Woodstock, Illinois
- WZTG in Clayton, Georgia
- WZWG in West Grove, Pennsylvania
- WZXH in Hagerstown, Maryland
