= Mass media in Boston =

This is a list of television and radio stations along with a list of media outlets in and around Boston, Massachusetts, United States, including the Greater Boston area. As the television media market known as "Boston–(Manchester)", it stretches as far north as Manchester, New Hampshire, and ranks as the ninth largest television market, and one of the 10 largest radio markets in the United States according to Nielsen Media Research.

== Broadcast ==
=== Radio ===
The Boston radio market is the tenth largest in the country, encompassing over 4 million people in Essex, Middlesex, Norfolk, Plymouth and Suffolk counties.

(*) – indicates a non-commercial radio station.

==== AM ====
- 590 WEZE Boston (Christian)
- 680 WRKO Boston (Conservative talk)
- 740 WJIB Cambridge (Adult standards/oldies)*
- 800 WNNW Lawrence (Tropical)
- 850 WEEI Boston (Sports/ESPN)
- 890 WAMG Dedham (Tropical)
- 950 WROL Boston (Christian)
- 980 WCAP Lowell (Full-service/talk/oldies)
- 1030 WBZ Boston (All-news/talk)
- 1060 WQOM Natick (Catholic/EWTN)*
- 1090 WILD Boston (Christian)
- 1120 WBNW Concord (Financial talk)
- 1150 WWDJ Boston (Relevant Radio)*
- 1200 WXKS Newton (Conservative talk)
- 1230 WESX Nahant (Christian/ethnic)
- 1260 WBIX Boston (Brazilian-Portuguese Christian)*
- 1300 WJDA Quincy (Reggaeton)
- 1330 WRCA Watertown (Classic rock)
- 1360 WLYN Lynn (Brokered/ethnic)
- 1390 WPLM Plymouth (Soft AC–WPLM-FM)
- 1400 WLLH Lowell (Tropical)
- 1430 WKOX Everett (Spanish Christian)
- 1450 WNBP Newburyport (Bloomberg–WRCA)
- 1460 WBMS Brockton (Adult contemporary)
- 1470 WAZN Watertown (Chinese)
- 1490 WCCM Haverhill (Spanish CHR)
- 1510 WMEX Quincy (Oldies/MeTV FM)
- 1530 WVBF Middleborough Center (Talk/RRS)
- 1550 WNTN Cambridge (Community/ethnic)
- 1570 WUBG Methuen (Spanish CHR)
- 1600 WUNR Brookline (Ethnic)

==== FM ====
- 88.1 WMBR Cambridge (Campus/free-form–MIT)*
- 88.3 WBMT Boxford (Campus/AOR)*
- 88.3 WIQH Concord (Campus/active rock–Concord-Carlisle HS)*
- 88.5 WWRN Rockport (RenewFM)*
- 88.9 WERS Boston (Campus/free-form–Emerson)*
- 89.1 WHAB Acton (Campus–Acton-Boxborough Regional HS)*
- 89.7 WGBH Boston (NPR)*
- 90.3 WZBC Newton (Campus/free-form–Boston College)*
- 90.9 WBUR-FM Boston (NPR)*
- 91.5 WMFO Medford (Campus/free-form–Tufts)*
- 91.5 WMLN-FM Milton (Campus/free-form–Curry)*
- 91.5 WUML Lowell (Campus–UMass Lowell)*
- 91.5 WUMZ Gloucester (WUMB-FM simulcast)*
- 91.5 WZLY Wellesley (Campus/free-form–Wellesley)*
- 91.7 WAVM Maynard (Campus–Maynard HS)*
- 91.7 WMWM Salem (Campus–Salem State)*
- 91.7 WNEF Newburyport (WUMB-FM simulcast)*
- 91.7 WUMT Marshfield (WUMB-FM simulcast)*
- 91.7 WUMG Stow (WUMB-FM simulcast)*
- 91.9 WUMB-FM Boston (Americana/roots-folk/blues–UMass Boston)*
- 92.5 WXRV Andover (Adult album alternative)
- 92.9 WBOS Brookline (Bloomberg)
- 93.7 WEEI-FM Lawrence (Sports/Westwood One Sports)
- 94.5 WJMN Boston (Mainstream urban)
- 95.3 WHRB Cambridge (Classical/campus/variety–Harvard)*
- 95.9 WATD-FM Marshfield (Adult contemporary)
- 96.9 WBQT Boston (Rhythmic hot AC)
- 97.7 WZRM Brockton (Spanish hits)
- 98.5 WBZ-FM Boston (Sports/Fox/MNCTV)
- 99.1 WPLM-FM Plymouth (Soft AC)
- 99.5 WCRB Lowell (Classical)*
- 99.9 WHHB Holliston (Campus/variety–Holliston HS)*
- 100.1 WBRS Waltham (Campus/variety–Brandeis)*
- 100.7 WZLX Boston (Classic rock)
- 101.7 WBWL Lynn (Country)
- 102.5 WKLB-FM Waltham (Country)
- 103.3 WBGB Boston (Adult hits)
- 104.1 WWBX Boston (Hot AC)
- 104.5 WXLO Fitchburg (Hot AC)
- 104.9 WNKC Gloucester (K-Love)*
- 104.9 WRBB Boston (Campus/free-form–Northeastern)*
- 105.7 WROR-FM Framingham (Classic hits)
- 106.7 WMJX Boston (Adult contemporary)
- 107.3 WKVB Westborough (K-Love)*
- 107.9 WXKS-FM Medford (Contemporary hits)

==== Part 15 ====
- WTBU—Boston University (640 AM and 89.3 FM, campus-only)

==== Silent ====
- 1410 WZBR Dedham

=== Television ===
The Boston television market includes all but the 4 westernmost counties and Bristol County in Massachusetts and the 6 southern counties in New Hampshire, plus Windham County, Vermont.

The following is a list of full-power stations serving the Metro Boston; for full listings, please see the Boston TV template.

(*) – indicates a network owned-and-operated station.

Channel	Call Sign	Network	Locale	Over-the-air Television Subchannel(s)	Owner
2.1	WGBH-TV	PBS	Boston	2.2 World Channel; 2.3 WGBH-S	WGBH Educational Foundation
4.1	WBZ-TV	CBS*	Boston	4.2 Start TV; 4.3 Dabl; 4.4 Outlaw; 4.5 Catchy Comedy	CBS News and Stations
5.1	WCVB-TV	ABC	Boston	5.2 MeTV; 5.3 Story Television	Hearst Corporation
7.1	WHDH	Independent	Boston	7.2 Defy	Sunbeam Television
15.1	WBTS-CD	NBC*	Nashua, NH	15.2 Cozi TV; 15.3 NBC True CRMZ; 15.4 Oxygen	NBC Owned Television Stations
24.1	WFXZ-CD	The Business Television Network	Boston		Centerpost Media
25.1	WFXT	FOX	Boston	25.2 Charge! 25.3 Laff	Cox Media Group
27.1	WUTF-TV	UniMás	Worcester	27.2 LATV; 27.3 The Nest; 27.4 Jewelry Television	Entravision Communications
38.1	WSBK-TV	Independent	Boston	38.2 Heroes & Icons; 38.3 QVC; 38.4 QVC2; 38.5 Movies! 38.6 Confess	CBS News and Stations
40.1	WYDN	Daystar*	Lowell	40.2 VOZ; 40.3 ---	Word of God Fellowship, Inc.
44.1	WGBX-TV	PBS	Boston	44.2 PBS; 44.3 Create; 44.4 PBS Kids	WGBH Educational Foundation
50.1	WWJE-DT	True Crime	Derry, NH		
56.1	WLVI	The CW	Cambridge	56.2 Buzzr	Sunbeam Television
60.1	WNEU	Telemundo*	Merrimack, NH	60.2 TeleXitos	Telemundo Station Group
66.1	WUNI	Univision*	Marlborough	66.2 MovieSphere Gold; 66.3 Great Entertainment Television; 66.4 Court TV; 66.5 B2B	TelevisaUnivision

- 46 WWDP Norwell (Shop LC)

- 58 WDPX-TV Woburn (Court TV)*
- 62 WMFP Foxborough (SonLife)
- 68 WBPX-TV Boston (Ion Television)*

==== Low power ====
Channel	Call Sign	Network	Locale	Over-the-air Television Subchannel(s)	Owner
17.1	WWOO-LD		Westmoreland, NH		

==== Cable channels ====
- New England Cable News
- New England Sports Network
- NBC Sports Boston
- CatholicTV
- Boston Neighborhood Network (public-access television cable TV)

== Print ==
=== Newspapers ===
==== Daily ====
- The Boston Globe
- The Boston Herald

==== Weekly ====
- The Armenian Mirror-Spectator
- The Armenian Weekly
- Banker & Tradesman, business weekly
- Bay State Banner, African-American weekly
- Bay Windows, LGBT weekly
- Boston Business Journal
- The Christian Science Monitor, daily online, weekly print magazine
- Commercial Record, business weekly
- Massachusetts Lawyers Weekly
- The Pilot, Catholic weekly
- La Semana, Spanish weekly

==== Bi-weekly and monthly ====
- Just Property, focused on real estate
- Just Rentals, focused on real estate
- The Rainbow Times, the largest LGBTQ monthly newspaper in Boston, serving all of New England
- Sampan, bilingual, Chinese and English
- Spare Change News

==== Neighborhood papers ====
- Allston-Brighton TAB
- Boston Guardian (effective successor of defunct Boston Courant)
- Boston Sun (formerly Back Bay Sun)
- Beacon Hill Times
- Charlestown Patriot-Bridge
- Dorchester Reporter
- East Boston Sun Transcript
- Fenway News
- Hyde Park Tribune
- Jamaica Plain Gazette
- Mattapan Reporter
- Mission Hill Gazette
- South End News
- West Roxbury Transcript

==== Inner suburbs ====
- Arlington Advocate
- Belmont Citizen-Herald
- Brookline TAB
- Cambridge Chronicle & TAB
- Cambridge Day
- Newton TAB
- Somerville Journal
- Watertown TAB
- The Patriot Ledger

==== Outer suburbs ====
- The Eagle-Tribune of North Andover
- MetroWest Daily News of Framingham
- The Lowell Sun of Lowell
- "Winchester Star"

==== College newspapers ====
- The Berkeley Beacon, Emerson College, weekly, online daily
- The Daily Free Press, Boston University, weekly, online daily
- The Harvard Crimson, Harvard University, daily
- The Harvard Voice, Harvard University, weekly
- The Heights, Boston College weekly, online daily
- The Hub, Emmanuel College, online
- The Huntington News, Northeastern University, weekly
- The Mass Media, University of Massachusetts Boston, weekly
- The Simmons Voice, Simmons College, weekly
- The Suffolk Journal, Suffolk University, weekly
- The Suffolk Voice, Suffolk University, online daily
- The Summit, Stonehill College
- The Tech, Massachusetts Institute of Technology, weekly
- The Tufts Daily, Tufts University, daily
- The 1851 Chronicle, Lasell University, monthly

=== Wire Services ===
- Associated Press Boston bureau
- State House News Service, a local news wire covering Massachusetts state government

=== Others ===
- Barstool Sports
- Big Red & Shiny, online contemporary arts magazine with coverage and arts criticism for Greater Boston and New England
- Boston Art Review, a print and online magazine on contemporary art in Boston
- Boston Common, magazine
- The Boston Independent Media Center, provides alternative views
- Boston Live Magazine, live music and entertainment
- Boston Magazine, a monthly lifestyles magazine
- Boston Review, a national political and arts magazine
- Boston Spirit Magazine, gay and lesbian life and style magazine, for Greater Boston and New England
- CommonWealth, online magazine and quarterly print publication about politics and policy in Massachusetts
- Nieman Lab, online publication covering media and journalism based at Harvard's Nieman Foundation
- Open Media Boston, progressive online metro news weekly serving the Boston area
- NewBostonPost, conservative news website
- STAT, an online publication covering health and life sciences, owned by The Boston Globe

== See also ==
- Massachusetts media
  - Media of cities in Massachusetts: Fall River, MA/Providence, RI, Springfield, Worcester
- List of television shows set in Boston
