= WXJM =

- Harrisonburg, Virginia; United States
- Broadcast area: Metro Harrisonburg
- Frequency: 88.7 MHz
- Branding: "88–7 WXJM"

Programming
- Format: Variety

Ownership
- Owner: James Madison University; (James Madison University Board of Visitors)
- Sister stations: WEMC, WMRA, WMRL, WMRY, WMLU

History
- First air date: October 1, 1990
- Former call signs: WZJM (1989); WXJM (1989–present)
- Call sign meaning: WX James Madison

Technical information
- Facility ID: 4247
- Class: A
- ERP: 390 watts
- HAAT: 19 metres (62 ft)
- Transmitter coordinates: 38°26′22″N 78°52′21″W

Links
- Webcast: WXJM Webstream
- Website: WXJM Online

WXJM (88.7 FM) is an American non-commercial educational radio station licensed to serve Harrisonburg, Virginia, United States. The station, established in 1990, is owned and operated by James Madison University. The station's broadcast license is held by the James Madison University Board of Visitors.

WXJM station management reports to the JMU Media Board, which is under the jurisdiction of the University Board of Visitors. WXJM also receives guidance and technical support from WMRA, a public radio station owned by the university.

== Coverage ==
WXJM broadcasts a variety music format to the greater Harrisonburg metropolitan area. WXJM's tower and antenna sits atop Burruss Hall on the JMU campus. The station operates with an effective radiated power (ERP) of 390 watts. Although the local-grade (60 dBu) contour of the station is about 6 miles (9.7 km), it can be heard with a good radio in Staunton, which is approximately 20 miles (32 km) southwest of the station.

== History ==
The forerunner of WXJM was the audio stream played over a few James Madison University campus buildings' public address systems to give interested students some practice with broadcasting. In the late 1980s and early 1990s, the "Dining Hall DJ's" advocated for airborne-broadcast capability. Early planners sought a callsign of WJMRm for James Madison Radio, but the letters were already taken by an FM station in Wisconsin.

The Board of Visitors of James Madison University filed an application with the Federal Communications Commission (FCC) to construct a new FM radio station in March 1988. This station would broadcast with 260 watts of effective radiated power from an antenna 14.5 metres (48 ft) in height above average terrain (HAAT). The FCC granted the original construction permit for this new station on September 1, 1989, with a scheduled expiration date of March 1, 1991.

The station was assigned the callsign "WZJM" by the FCC on October 31, 1989. Just a few weeks later, on November 17, 1989, this was changed to the current "WXJM" callsign. FM radios could pick up the signal, but reception off-campus was seldom possible.

In March 1990, the station sought an upgrade to an ERP of 390 watts and an antenna HAAT of 20 metres (66 ft). The FCC authorized these changes in July 1990. In October 1990, the station was nearing completion and asked the FCC to allow it to lower its antenna slightly to 19 metres (62 ft) in HAAT.

WXJM 88.7 MHz Broadcast Location

On October 10, 1990, WXJM applied for its license to cover. After the authorized modifications to the antenna were completed, the FCC granted the station its broadcast license on August 6, 1991.

Some of the early student radio announcers banded together in a club called the "Freak Possie". The radio Freaks turned media arts class performance-art projects into pickets and absurdist attention-getting events to get publicity and to advocate for a stronger off-campus broadcast capability. Events included mass weddings to bananas and speeches by fursuit-wearing performers including a Three-Eyed Antlered Pig who mocked the university's official mascot, the Duke Dog.

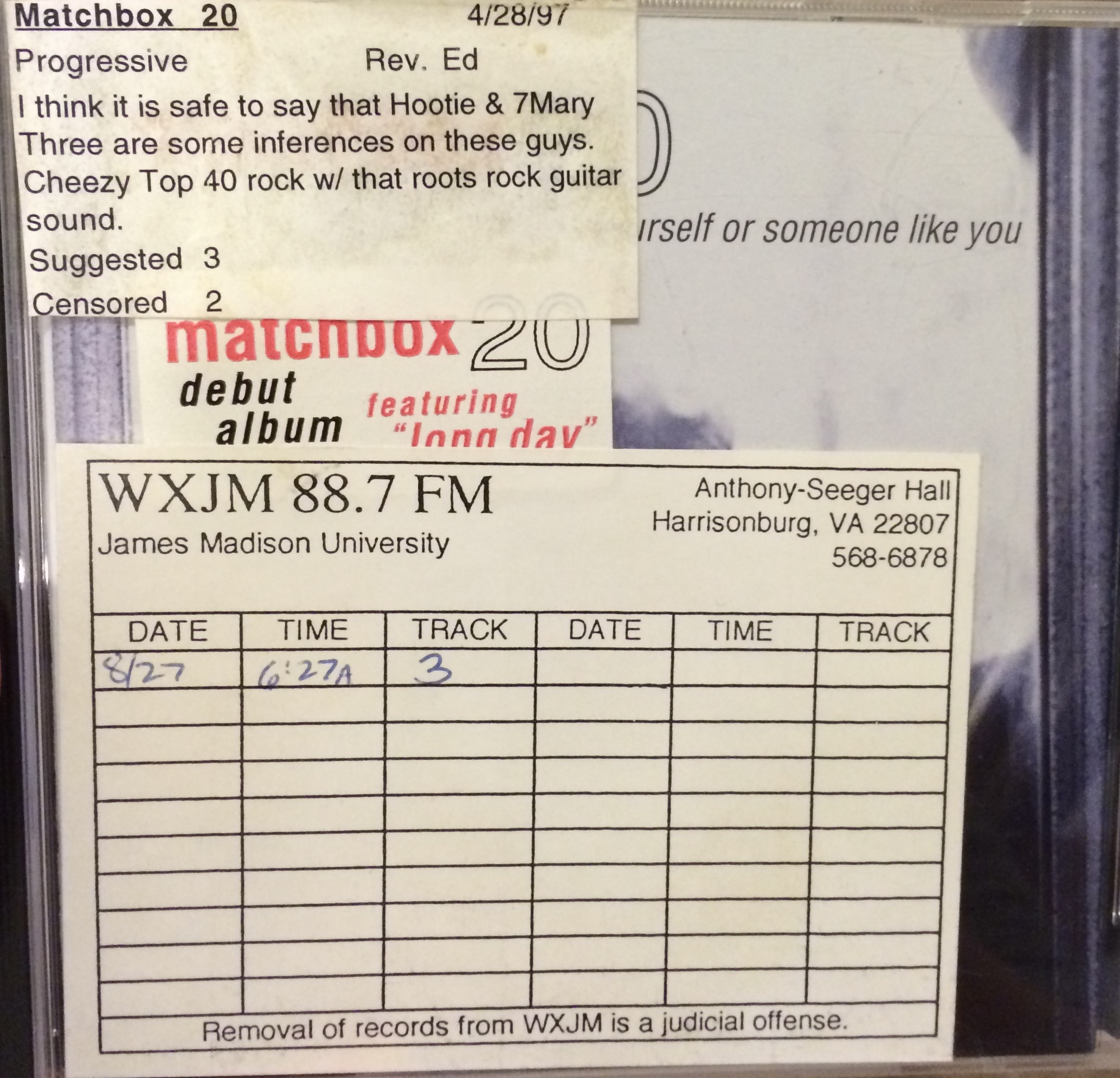
Matchbox 20 compact disc from WXJM college radio station. Student review, attributed to "Ed", reads "I think it is safe to say that Hootie & 7Mary Three are some inferences on these guys. Cheezy Top 40 rock w/m that roots rock guitar sound."

In 2003, WXJM was levied a $3,000 forfeiture by the FCC due to public file documents which were "either filed late or are missing". The FCC declared the matter resolved with a notice of apparent liability in February 2008.

WXJM web-streaming started circa 2005. WXJM's original slogan, "Music Your Mother Won't Like", changed circa 2006 to "Electrifying Wilson Hall".

In May 2011, WXJM enhanced its overnight broadcast automation capability so that when live announcers are not present, listeners hear Bluegrass music provided by Possum Music Service instead of dead air.

== MACRoCk ==
Every spring since 1997, WXJM helps support the Mid-Atlantic College Radio Conference (MACRoCk) at various venues in and around Harrisonburg. Some MACRoCks have drawn over 100 bands and a reported 6,000 concertgoers.

== Notable WXJM Alumni ==
- Jim Acosta, broadcast journalist
