= XHLL-TDT =

Television station in Villahermosa, Tabasco, Mexico

Villahermosa, Tabasco; Mexico
- Channels: Digital: 33 (UHF); Virtual: 6

Programming
- Affiliations: Multimedios Television

Ownership
- Owner: Grupo Pazos; (Televisión de Tabasco, S.A. de C.V.)

History
- Founded: October 12, 1968
- Last air date: December 31, 2021 (concession)
- Former channel numbers: 13 (analog and digital virtual, to 2016); 5 (digital virtual, 2016–2019); 8 (virtual, 2020–2021)
- Former affiliations: El Canal de las Estrellas (1972-1995); Canal 5 (1995-2019)
- Call sign meaning: LL in "Villahermosa"

Technical information
- Licensing authority: IFT
- ERP: 12 kW
- Transmitter coordinates: 17°59′00″N 92°57′00″W

Links
- Website: www.rnco.com.mx

XHLL-TDT (channel 6) was a television station in Villahermosa, Tabasco, Mexico, which broadcast from 1968 to 2021. It was owned by Grupo Pazos and co-located with the studios of radio stations XHVA and XHTAB in Col. Gil y Sáenz in Villahermosa.

XHLL was Tabasco's first television station, brought on air to broadcast the 1968 Summer Olympics. It aired local programming until early 1972, when the station converted to a full-time repeater of national network programming: the XEW network (1972–1995), Canal 5 (1995–2019), and Multimedios Television for its final two years of operation. The concession was not renewed, and the station left the air at the end of 2021.

== History ==
XHLL began broadcasting on October 12, 1968, with coverage of the opening ceremony of the 1968 Summer Olympics from Mexico City. The station was owned by Televisión de Tabasco, S.A., a joint venture of Fernando and Baltasar Pazos de la Torre (owners of XEVA radio) and Clemente Serna Alvear, owner of Radio Programas de México, with which XEVA was affiliated. During the course of the Olympics, the station carried the games from 9am to 7pm, after which the station shut down for the day; when the Olympics ended, it started airing local programming recorded using 16-milimiter reels (which was a cheaper option than videotaping). Among the live programs, there were La Hora de Hilda, with Hilda del Rosario de Gómez, Telehogar, with Araceli Rojas Tenorio, Imagen del Mundo, with Rafael Vila Escalante and Sergio Morales Macías and Telepanorama, with Rafael Vila Escalante y Sergio Morales Macías. The rest of the line-up consisted of programs produced by the networks in the capital or imported series: Noches tapatías, Voyage to the Bottom of the Sea, Laurel and Hardy films, The Twilight Zone, The Green Hornet, The Untouchables, cartoons, youth music and vintage Mexican movies.

XHLL operated as a local station until early 1972, when the local operation was closed for financial reasons, as well as the lack of a specific local project. For more than 47 years, XHLL operated in national network service, airing the XEW network beginning with the fight between Rafael Herrera and Enrique "Maravilla" Pinder, at 10pm on July 29, 1972. This was possible because Televicentro (of the XEW network) started renting its facilities to convert it into a mere relay.

It then switched to Canal 5 when Televisa built its own XEW repeater in Villahermosa, XHVIZ-TV, in 1995.

In November 2019, Televisa received authorization to multiplex Canal 5 on the XHVIZ-TDT transmitter beginning January 1, 2020; in its application, it noted that Televisa's affiliation with XHLL-TDT would end on December 31, 2019. The IFT assigned XHLL virtual channel 8 to use when Canal 5 moved to XHVIZ. As a result of the lost program source, the station began broadcasting a time lapse loop of the Pazos studio and transmitter building on January 1.

Shortly after, XHLL affiliated with Multimedios Televisión. The virtual channel changed to channel 6 to match the programming in 2021. The station's concession expired on December 31, 2021, and was not renewed, resulting in its shutdown.
