= WTYN =

WTYN may refer to:

- WTYN (FM), a radio station (91.7 FM) licensed to serve Lunenburg, Massachusetts, United States
- WTYN (AM), a radio station (1160 AM) licensed to serve Tryon, North Carolina, United States, which held the call sign WTYN from 1954 to 1994
