= WMRL =

The abbreviation WMRL or W.M.R.L. may refer to:

- WMRL (FM), a satellite station of the American radio station WMRA
- West Midlands (Regional) League, an English soccer competition
