= WTHA =

WTHA may refer to:

- WTHA (FM), a radio station (88.1 FM) licensed to serve Berlin, New Jersey, United States
- WTHA-LP, a defunct low-power radio station (107.1 FM) formerly licensed to serve Seaside, Florida, United States
