= XHD =

XHD may refer to:

- eXtreme Hard Drive, a feature on Gigabyte Technology motherboards which assists RAID setup
- External hard drive (hard disk drive)
- XHD-FM, a radio station in Ixmiquilpan, Hidalgo
- XHD-TV, a television station in Tampico, Tamaulipas
