= WNJS =

WNJS may refer to:

- WNJS (TV), a television station (channel 23, virtual 23) licensed to Camden, New Jersey, United States
- WTHA (FM), a radio station (88.1 FM) licensed to serve Berlin, New Jersey, which held the call sign WNJS-FM from 1991 to 2023
