= WRLC =

WRLC may refer to:

- Washington Research Library Consortium
- WRLC (FM), a radio station (91.7 FM) licensed to Williamsport, Pennsylvania, United States
- Bontang Airport, in Bontang, Indonesia (ICAO code WRLC)
- WVPH (90.3 The Core) in Piscataway, New Jersey. The station's current incarnation is the result of a merger between the former Livingston College radio station WRLC-AM, and Piscataway High School's radio station. The station still uses "RLC" in its branding.
