= WLCX =

WLCX may refer to:

- WLCX (AM), a radio station (1490 AM) licensed to serve La Crosse, Wisconsin, United States
- WMLU, a radio station (91.3 FM) licensed to serve Farmville, Virginia, United States, which held the call sign WLCX from 1986 to 2002
