= WMCN =

WMCN is the callsign of:

- WMCN (FM), a radio station (91.7 FM) licensed to St. Paul, Minnesota, United States
- WMCN-TV, a television station (channel 44) licensed to Princeton, New Jersey, United States
