= WRDV =

Radio station in Warminster, Pennsylvania

Coordinates: 40.2054°N 75.1071°W

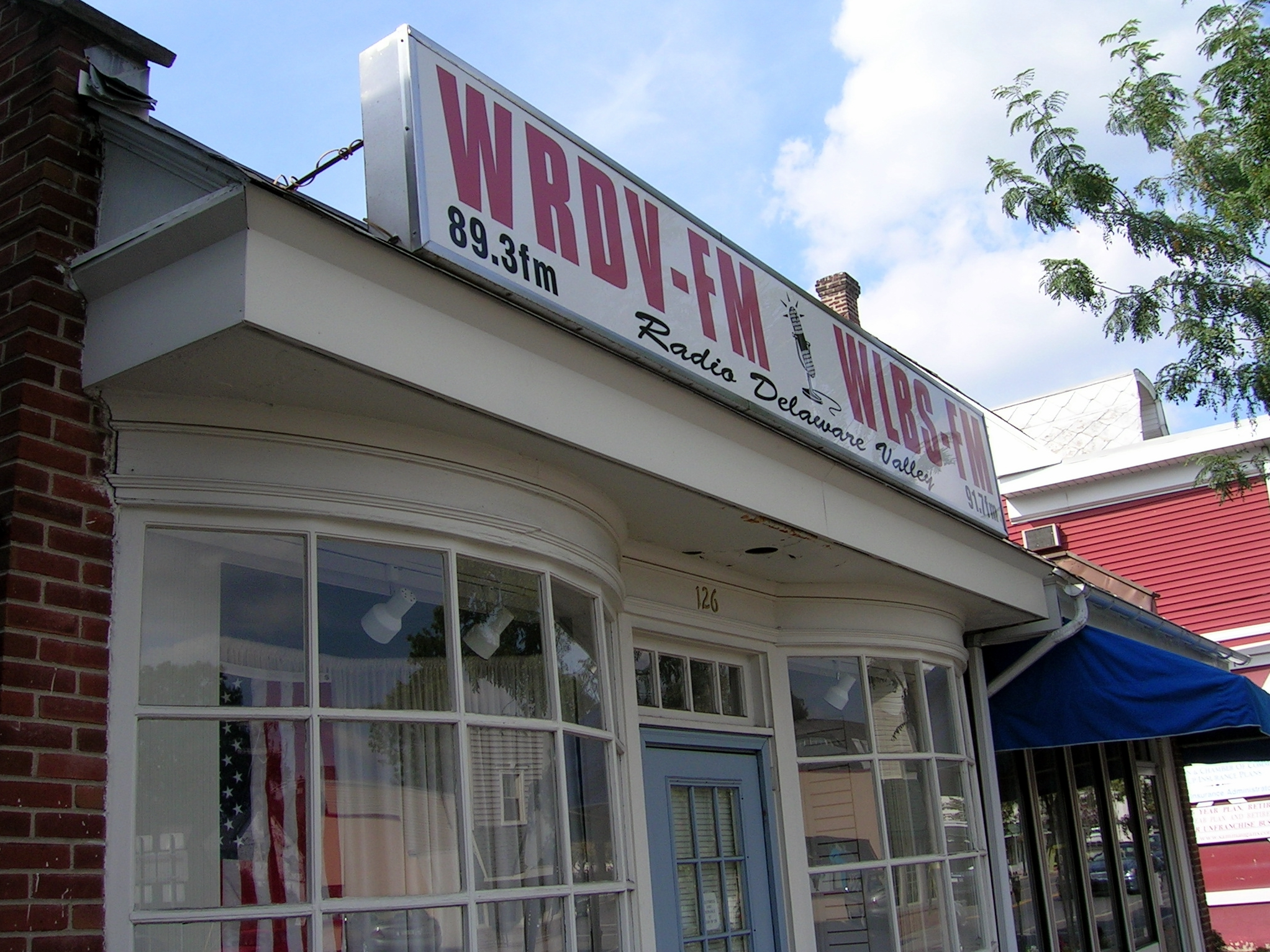
- WRDV headquarters, Hatboro, Pennsylvania
- Warminster, Pennsylvania; United States
- Broadcast area: Philadelphia metropolitan area
- Frequency: 89.3 MHz

Programming
- Format: Big band; doo wop; oldies

Ownership
- Owner: Bux-Mont Educational Radio Association

History
- First air date: 1976
- Former call signs: WCSD (1976–1986)

Technical information
- Licensing authority: FCC
- Facility ID: 7931
- Class: A
- ERP: 85 watts horizontal; 1,600 watts vertical
- HAAT: 36 meters (118 ft)
- Translators: 97.1 W246AR (Bensalem); 105.7 W289CZ (Lansdale); 107.3 W297AD (Philadelphia)
- Repeaters: 88.1 WTHA (Berlin, New Jersey); 91.7 WLBS (Bristol)

Links
- Public license information: Public file; LMS
- Webcast: Listen live
- Website: www.wrdv.org

WRDV is a U.S. public radio station serving some northern suburbs of the Philadelphia, Pennsylvania, area. The radio station studio is located in Hatboro and the broadcast tower in Warminster. WRDV's program hosts are volunteers who frequently play their own album collections on the air.

== Programming ==
Music selection varies widely by host. Some of the music includes blues, country, jazz, 1920s and 1930s big band, doo-wop, a cappella, soul, rhythm and blues, beautiful music and polka.

== History ==
WRDV began broadcasting on September 6, 1976 as WCSD, a 10-watt radio station located at the former William Tennent High School on Street Road. Its call letters are the initials of the station's original owner, the Centennial School District. In 1980 the station license was transferred from the School District to the Bux-Mont Educational Radio Association and the station relocated to the basement of the Warminster Township Building/Police Department at Henry and Gibson Avenues in Warminster, Pennsylvania. It began operations there on May 15, 1980, after a 16-month period of silence. In 1981 it increased power to 200 watts and in 1986 its callsign changed to WRDV which stand for "Radio in the Delaware Valley". In 1987 WRDV began the "Delaware Valley Radio Network" by simulcasting on a translator in Sellersville/Quakertown on 88.7 MHz and, in 1988, adding a translator on 91.9 MHz in Lawrenceville/Trenton.

Also in the late 1980s, several members of the station management launched sister station WDVR 89.7 FM, which is now located in Sergeantsville, New Jersey.

In the 1990s, WRDV increased power to 1,000 watts and WRDV's 91.9 relay was reassigned to relay WDVR in Princeton. The Sellersville transmitter was closed and the Federal Communications Commission (FCC) cancelled its license in 1998. WRDV later added 10-Watt translator relay W297AD on 107.3 in Philadelphia, and 84–watt relay W300AA on 107.9 MHz in Bensalem, Pennsylvania. In the late 1990s WRDV relocated its studios to Hatboro, Pennsylvania, and began simulcasting WRDV programming on co-owned WLBS in Bristol, Pennsylvania, with 100 watts on 91.7 MHz. On May 25, 2004, WRDV changed the Bensalem frequency to 97.1 MHz, with the callsign W246AR. Today WRDV operates with 1,600 watts of power from its Warminster transmitter site where its transmitter has operated since 1980.

== See also ==
- List of community radio stations in the United States
