= WCMX =

- Leominster, Massachusetts; United States
- Broadcast area: Montachusett-North County
- Frequency: 1000 kHz
- Branding: RenuevoAM

Programming
- Language: Spanish
- Format: Christian radio
- Affiliations: RenewFM

Ownership
- Owner: Horizon Christian Fellowship
- Sister stations: WFGL; WJWT; WTYN

History
- First air date: November 1967
- Former call signs: WLMS (1967–1982)
- Call sign meaning: Station formerly branded as "Country Music 10"; "X" is the Roman numeral for 10

Technical information
- Licensing authority: FCC
- Facility ID: 54850
- Class: D
- Power: 1,000 watts day
- Transmitter coordinates: 42°31′25.3″N 71°44′5.3″W

Links
- Public license information: Public file; LMS
- Webcast: Listen live
- Website: renewfm.org/spanish/

WCMX (1000 AM; "RenuevoAM") is a radio station broadcasting a Spanish language Christian radio format. Licensed to Leominster, Massachusetts, United States, the station is owned by Horizon Christian Fellowship and features programming from RenewFM. WCMX's transmitter is located on a cell tower near the Mall at Whitney Field.

By day, WCMX is powered by 1,000 watts on 1000 AM, but at night to protect United States station WMVP in Chicago, KNWN in Seattle, WCMX signs off to avoid interference.

== History ==
WCMX began operations in November 1967, as MOR station WLMS. The station was founded and established by Clarance Allain. WLMS tried Top 40 briefly in 1968, competing with local established Top 40 station WEIM, but quickly reverted to MOR, a format that it continued through the 1970s. In 1981, it was purchased by Dr. Donn Parker and became country music station WCMX, and continued that format until late 1988, when it changed to adult contemporary. The call letters stand for "country music 10", referencing the station's dial position in Roman numerals. In 1990, the station moved to an oldies/AC hybrid. In August 1992, WCMX went dark and was put up for sale. It was sold to Twin Cities Baptist Temple late that year and came back on the air in 1996 with a new tower and ground system as a Christian radio station.

In June 2015, Twin City Baptist hired a new station manager to oversee a complete format overhaul of WCMX. "Hope 1000", which had been the previous name for the station, became "The Power AM 1000". The station continued to broadcast nationally known Bible teaching programs alongside modern Christian music with styles and genres ranging from adult contemporary and modern worship to rock, hip hop and electronic dance music. The Power celebrated their official launch on October 31, 2015, with an evening party that was open to the public.

As of April 8, 2018, the station was silent; WCMX resumed broadcasting on April 2, 2019. On January 14, 2020, the station once again fell silent as a result of the ownership looking to exit broadcasting.

In 2021, the station was sold to Horizon Christian Fellowship for $12,000, and became RenewFM's first Spanish-language station.
