= XHBCD-FM =

Radio station in Pachuca, Hidalgo

Pachuca; Mexico
- Broadcast area: Pachuca, Hidalgo, Mexico
- Frequency: 98.1 FM
- Branding: Bella Airosa Radio

Programming
- Format: Public

Ownership
- Owner: Radio y Televisión de Hidalgo

History
- First air date: December 3, 1985
- Last air date: 2022

Technical information
- ERP: 2,415 watts
- Transmitter coordinates: 20°06′23″N 98°44′14″W

Links
- Website: radioytelevision.hidalgo.gob.mx/radio-2/

XHBCD-FM was a radio station in Pachuca and is part of the Radio y Televisión de Hidalgo state network. It broadcasts on 98.1 MHz from the RTH studios in the center of Pachuca.

The station signed on in the early 1980s as part of the construction of the state radio and TV networks.
