= XHMEC-FM =

Radio station in Amecameca, State of Mexico

Amecameca, Mexico, Mexico; Mexico
- Frequency: 91.7 MHz
- Branding: Mexiquense Radio

Ownership
- Owner: Gobierno del Estado de México

History
- First air date: 2002
- Call sign meaning: AMECameca

Technical information
- ERP: 0.3 kW
- Transmitter coordinates: 19°17′40″N 98°45′46″W

Links
- Website: sistemamexiquense.mx/radio

XHMEC-FM is a radio station in Amecameca on 91.7 FM, owned by the government of the State of Mexico. It is part of the Radio Mexiquense state radio network.
