= XHCIA-FM =

Radio station in Colima, Colima, Mexico

- Colima, Colima; Mexico
- Frequency: 91.7 MHz
- Branding: 91.7, Tu Playlist

Programming
- Format: Pop

Ownership
- Owner: Colima Frecuencia Modulada, S.A. de C.V.

History
- First air date: September 28, 1993 (concession)
- Call sign meaning: Coquimatlán, original proposed station location

Technical information
- Class: B
- ERP: 31.44 kW

Links
- Webcast: Listen live
- Website: 917colima.mx

XHCIA-FM is a radio station on 91.7 FM in Colima, Colima, Mexico, airing a pop format.

== History ==
Logo as Radio Disney, used from February 17, 2014 until December 25, 2019

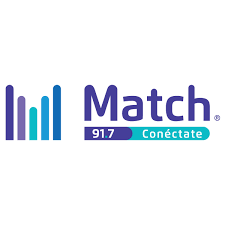
Logo as Match, used from December 25, 2019 until June 5, 2021

XHCIA received its concession on September 28, 1993; originally licensed to Coquimatlán, it was owned by Rosa María Quintero Barbosa. It was sold to its current concessionaire in 1997.

=== Match ===
On December 25, 2019, Disney and ACIR announced they were mutually ending their relationship, which had covered twelve Mexican cities. Ten of the twelve Radio Disney stations, including XHCIA, were transitioned to ACIR's replacement pop format, Match.

=== Sale ===
In 2021, concessionaire Colima Frecuencia Modulada, S.A. de C.V., which was 50 percent owned by ACIR and 50 percent by Gustavo Adolfo Petriccioli Morales, sold itself to Manuel Armando Caraveo Urenda y José Encarnación Silvestre Rocha. The station dropped the ACIR-specific Match brand but remained in the pop format as "91.7, Tu Playlist".
