= XHACT-FM =

Radio station in Actopan, Hidalgo

Actopan, Hidalgo; Mexico
- Frequency: 91.7 MHz
- Branding: Radio Actopan

Programming
- Format: Public radio

Ownership
- Owner: Radio y Televisión de Hidalgo

History
- First air date: 1999
- Last air date: 2022

Technical information
- ERP: 3 kW
- Transmitter coordinates: 20°11′16″N 98°55′10″W

Links
- Website: radioytelevision.hidalgo.gob.mx

XHACT-FM was a radio station on 91.7 FM in Actopan, Hidalgo, part of the Radio y Televisión de Hidalgo state radio network.

== History ==
XHACT received its most recent permit in 1999.
