= WMRA =

Public radio station at James Madison University in Harrisonburg, Virginia

Harrisonburg, Virginia; United States
- Broadcast area: Central Shenandoah Valley
- Frequency: 90.7 MHz
- Branding: WMRA

Programming
- Format: Public Radio
- Affiliations: American Public Media; BBC World Service; NPR; Public Radio International

Ownership
- Owner: James Madison University; (James Madison University Board of Visitors)
- Sister stations: WMRL, WMRY

History
- First air date: 1969
- Former frequencies: 91.1 MHz (1969–1975)
- Call sign meaning: W (James) Madison Radio Associates

Technical information
- Licensing authority: FCC
- Facility ID: 65447
- Class: B
- Power: 10,500 watts
- HAAT: 318 metres (1,043 ft)
- Transmitter coordinates: 38°33′50.0″N 78°57′0.0″W

Links
- Public license information: Public file; LMS
- Webcast: Listen Live
- Website: wmra.org

WMRA (90.7 FM) is a public-radio formatted broadcast radio station licensed to Harrisonburg, Virginia. It is the NPR member station for the central Shenandoah Valley. Combined with its full-power repeaters and low-power translators, it serves much of west-central Virginia from Winchester to Lexington as well as the Charlottesville area. WMRA is owned and operated by James Madison University.

== History ==
WMRA signed on in the summer of 1969, broadcasting on 91.1 MHz with 10 watts. The transmitter was at 851 South Main Street in Harrisonburg and the studios were at Alumni Hall on the campus of what was then Madison College. WMRA's signal was sufficient to cover the city of Harrisonburg proper. The station aired from 4 p.m. to midnight daily, and was a typical college radio station, with all programming produced by students.

WMRA moved to 90.7 MHz and upgraded power to 19.5 kW on November 12, 1975, at which time the station also applied for funding from the Corporation for Public Broadcasting and joined NPR. As a condition of CPB funding, the station hired professional staff. While students continued to handle many on-air operations, the station adopted a typical public radio format of NPR news, talk, and classical music, with specialty programs of folk and jazz. Unusually for a public radio station, a student-programmed progressive rock show took the late-night timeslot. All rock music was dropped in 1980 owing to low listenership, to "no great student response", according to then-general manager Don Lanham. Student programming moved to WXJM (88.7 FM) when that station signed on in 1990.

Previous logo

On January 14, 2008, WMRA took over the operation of Eastern Mennonite University's WEMC (91.7 FM), which faced declining ratings and little student interest. WMRA moved its daytime classical programming there in exchange for extra NPR programs that WEMC had previously aired because WMRA could not fit them into its schedule. Both stations kept their evening schedules intact; WMRA was hesitant to move its evening music programs due to WEMC's inferior signal. WEMC went all-classical on August 11, 2014, while WMRA picked up WEMC's remaining information programming and dropped its weekday music programming. WMRA has since started airing several weekend music programs and occasional weeknight music programming.

== Network ==
WMRA programming is heard on network of three full-powered repeaters. WMRL and WMRY are straight simulcasts of WMRA; their existence is only acknowledged on WMRA's legal IDs. WMLU is owned by Longwood University, and breaks off from WMRA in evening and late-night timeslots to air its own music and student programming.

Call sign	Frequency (MHz)	City of license	ERP W	Class	FCC	Broadcast times
WMLU	91.3	Farmville, Virginia	440	A	FCC (WMLU)	2 a.m. to 7 p.m.
WMRL	89.9	Lexington, Virginia	100	A	FCC (WMRL)	24 hours
WMRY	103.5	Crozet, Virginia	280	A	FCC (WMRY)	24 hours

WMRA also operates one fill-in translator in Winchester, Virginia due to interference from Washington's WETA on 90.9.

Call sign	Frequency	City of license	FID	ERP (W)	Class	FCC info
W233AA	94.5 FM	Winchester, Virginia	6129	45	D	LMS
