= WRYP =

- Wellfleet, Massachusetts; United States
- Broadcast area: Hyannis, Massachusetts; Cape Cod, Massachusetts
- Frequency: 90.1 MHz
- Branding: RenewFM

Programming
- Format: Christian
- Network: RenewFM

Ownership
- Owner: Horizon Christian Fellowship
- Sister stations: WYZX

History
- First air date: April 2006
- Former call signs: WWTE (2003–2006)
- Call sign meaning: "Renew Your Passion"

Technical information
- Licensing authority: FCC
- Facility ID: 122299
- Class: A
- ERP: 2,500 watts (vertical only)
- HAAT: 24.3 meters (80 ft)
- Transmitter coordinates: 42°1′53.3″N 70°5′24″W
- Translators: 96.7 W244CF (Plymouth); 102.1 W271CG (Quincy)

Links
- Public license information: Public file; LMS
- Webcast: Listen live
- Website: www.renewfm.org

WRYP (90.1 FM, "Renew FM") is a radio station licensed to Wellfleet, Massachusetts, United States, that serves the Cape Cod market and broadcasts a Christian format. The station is an affiliate of RenewFM and is licensed to Horizon Christian Fellowship.

The station was assigned the WRYP call letters by the Federal Communications Commission on May 9, 2006.

== See also ==
- RenewFM
