= WFGL =

- Fitchburg, Massachusetts; United States
- Broadcast area: Worcester, Massachusetts
- Frequency: 960 kHz
- Branding: RenewFM

Programming
- Format: Christian radio
- Network: RenewFM

Ownership
- Owner: Horizon Christian Fellowship
- Sister stations: WCMX; WJWT; WTYN

History
- First air date: February 15, 1950
- Former call signs: WFGM (1950–1967); WFGL (1967–1991); WXLO (1991–1992)

Technical information
- Licensing authority: FCC
- Facility ID: 8418
- Class: B
- Power: 2,500 watts day; 1,000 watts night
- Transmitter coordinates: 42°35′24.32″N 71°49′41.27″W
- Translator: 106.1 W291DA (Fitchburg)

Links
- Public license information: Public file; LMS
- Website: www.renewfm.org

WFGL (960 AM) is a radio station broadcasting a Christian radio format and licensed to Fitchburg, Massachusetts, United States. The station is owned by Horizon Christian Fellowship of Fitchburg, and operates as part of its RenewFM network.

== History ==
The station went on the air February 15, 1950, as WFGM at 1580 kilohertz. WFGM's original studios were located on the 3rd floor of a downtown building at the corner of Main and Prichard Streets in Fitchburg, Massachusetts. The original transmitter included one broadcast tower on Lunenburg Street near the current intersection of John Fitch Highway. The station had a power output of 1,000 watts. Several years later, new studios were constructed in a renovated townhouse at 170 Prichard Street, which was then renamed Broadcast House. A new four-tower transmitter was constructed atop Alpine Hill and the station's frequency was changed to 960 kHz.

In 1960, the station was granted a license for FM station WFGM-FM 104.5, which later became WBNE, WFMP and eventually WXLO. On November 1, 1962, the stations were sold to local businessman George Chatfield who in turn acquired a local newspaper, The Montachusett Review. The AM's call sign was changed to WFGL in 1967. WFMP-FM became popular for featuring country music in the 1970s featuring the legendary Gene LaVerne and Dave Brown.

In 1979, WFGL and WFMP were sold to Montachusett Broadcasting. During this time period it featured the on-air talents of Dave Svens, Scott May, Paul Belfay, Greg Vine, Gail Dussault and Al Brodie, among others. Over the years the station had an adult contemporary format, but in 1982 switched to a standards format featuring big bands from the 1930s and 1940s as well as easy listening hits of the 1940s and 1950s, non-rock songs from the late 1950s and 1960s, and an occasional easy listening song from the 1970s. The station focused on big bands and standards from the mid 1940s to the late 1950s. During this period, WFGL carried the syndicated format Stardust, initially only in overnights. WFGL was granted a power increase to 2,500 watts in 1984.

By 1986, the station was using the satellite format middays, evenings, overnights, and weekends after noon. The music also gradually was modified both on Stardust and locally as soft rock songs from the 1950s to the early 1980s were being mixed in. By 1990 the station was playing about half baby boomer pop and half standards both locally and on the satellite format.

In 1991, the station shut down locally, the station was renamed to WXLO, and programming was converted to a simulcast of WXLO-FM. Soon afterward, the station went silent; during the silent period, the WFGL call sign was reinstated. The station was then sold, and resumed broadcasting in October 1994 with the current Christian format.

In 2001, the studios moved to their current location in a refurbished brick mill building.

WFGL went silent on November 8, 2018, while the station's transmitter was being repaired; after repairs were completed, it resumed broadcasting January 26, 2019.

== Programming ==
Throughout its initial years WFGM and WFGL were considered full service radio stations, providing news and current affairs programming to the Fitchburg area communities. Among the programs carried was Frankly Speaking, a telephone call-in talk program that ran in various forms for over thirty years. The station also broadcast a middle of the road music format, featuring popular vocalists of the time. On-air talent in the mid-1960s included Ed Broughey, Bill Sterling, Ron Morgan, and Jerry McRell. Walt Clancy and Tom Conry did the news. Jim Chalmers was General Manager and sports announcer. Don Coleman was Chief Engineer, assisted by Jim Sullivan and Mal Coburn. Ray Loter programmed and was on-air for WBNE in the evening, when it did not simulcast WFGM. The stations owned an Amphicar, which made frequent appearances in parades as well as in Lake Whalom. As did many radio stations, in the 1980s the music format shifted to what became known as adult contemporary. The station also featured many popular local personalities including Tal Hood, Ed Broughey, Dick Ziegler. Chester Gaylord and, in the earlier years part-timer Jeff Mitchell. In 1985 the station returned to its musical roots by switching to a traditional pop music format, once again featuring popular vocalists and instrumentals from the 1930s through 1960s, while also serving as a full service outlet carrying live local sports and news. At this time the station was an affiliate of the CBS Radio Network.

== Translator ==
Call sign	Frequency	City of license	FID	ERP (W)	Class	Transmitter coordinates	FCC info
W291DA	106.1 FM	Fitchburg, Massachusetts	138873	250	D	42°35′23.3″N 71°49′40.3″W	LMS

== See also ==
- RenewFM
