= XHIY-FM =

Radio station in Ríoverde, San Luis Potosí, Mexico

Ríoverde, San Luis Potosí; Mexico
- Frequency: 91.7 MHz
- Branding: SPKtacular

Programming
- Format: Pop

Ownership
- Owner: Grupo Radiofónico MASS; (José Luis Martínez Sánchez)
- Sister stations: XHEEM-FM

History
- First air date: October 1, 1971 (AM); 2011 (FM)
- Former call signs: XEIY-AM
- Former frequencies: 1290 kHz (1971–2006); 650 kHz (2006–2014)

Technical information
- Class: B1
- ERP: 25 kW
- Transmitter coordinates: 21°55′52.85″N 100°00′40.69″W

Links
- Website: radiomasiy.com

XHIY-FM is a radio station on 91.7 FM in Ríoverde, San Luis Potosí, Mexico. It carries a pop format known as SPKtacular.

== History ==
XEIY-AM 1290 received its concession on September 3, 1971 began its October 1, 1971 with the founded by Carlos Martínez Guillen. It was owned by María Gertrudiz Sánchez de Martínez and broadcast as a daytimer with 250 watts, later 1,000. The station was initially known as Radio Juventud.

On April 7, 2006, XEIY was authorized to move to 650 kHz and increase power to 5 kW. In 2011, XEIY was approved for AM-FM migration as XHIY-FM 91.7; the AM shut down in 2014.
