= Radio y Televisión de Hidalgo =

Public broadcaster of the Mexican state of Hidalgo

Radio y Televisión de Hidalgo is the state television and radio agency of the Mexican state of Hidalgo. It also airs programming from Canal 22, Canal Once, TV UNAM and DW Español.

RTVH was founded in 1982 and began broadcasting on TV that year, signing on XHPAH channel 3. Its Pachuca radio station came to air in December 1985. As a result of a legal error, the state radio network lost most of its coverage in 2022.

== Radio stations ==
The Tlanchinol station, formerly XHIND-FM, is projected to return at an unspecified future date.

Call sign	Frequency	City	ERP/Power
XECPHH-AM	1010 AM	Huejutla de Reyes	1 kW day
XHCPDD-FM	92.7 FM	Huejutla de Reyes	-
XHCPDY-FM	91.1 FM	Jacala	6 kW
XHCPDZ-FM	94.1 FM	Tlanchinol	0.105 kW

The state network previously covered most of the state's population. However, it lost all of its radio concessions in 2022 (except for XHAPU, which expired without renewal on October 31, 2023) due to failure to renew. As a result of federal laws that protect 10 percent of FM spectrum for community and indigenous radio stations, the Federal Telecommunications Institute denied attempts to open the allotments for the state government to bid on. Of the five made available, plus the additional FM for Huejutla de Reyes, two received competing applications from the Universidad Autónoma del Estado de Hidalgo, delaying their award to either applicant. The failure to renew also resulted in the arrest of the former director of RTVH. In 2023, under new concessions, the AM station in Huejutla de Reyes plus a new FM station and the FM station in Jacala returned to the air.

Former RTVH stations no longer in service or replaced with new concessions
Call sign	Frequency	City	ERP/Power
XHACT-FM	91.7 FM	Actopan	3 kW
XHHUI-FM	103.7 FM	Huichapan	3 kW
XHD-FM	96.5 FM	Ixmiquilpan	5.06 kW
XHZG-FM	94.9 FM	Ixmiquilpan	6 kW
XHBCD-FM	98.1 FM	Pachuca	2.415 kW
XHPEC-FM	103.9 FM	San Bartolo Tutotepec	6 kW
XHAPU-FM	106.9 FM	Tepeapulco	0.25 kW
XHLLV-FM	89.3 FM	Tula	3 kW

== Television transmitters ==
RF	VC	Call sign	Location	ERP
27	12	XHHUH-TDT	Huejutla de Reyes	16.28 kW
22	12	XHIXM-TDT	Ixmiquilpan	5.88 kW
21	12	XHPAH-TDT	Pachuca	44.7 kW
23	12	XHTOH-TDT	Tepeapulco	4.18 kW
14	12	XHTHI-TDT	Tula	10.32 kW
22	12	XHTUH-TDT	Tulancingo	3.31 kW

In March 2018, in order to facilitate the repacking of TV services out of the 600 MHz band (channels 38-51), XHPAH (21), XHTHI (14) and XHTUH (22) were assigned new channels for continued digital operations.

The other five transmitters in Hidalgo did not switch to TDT.

Call sign	Channel	City	ERP/Power
XHAMH-TV	6	Atotonilco	1 kW
XHMOH-TV	7	Molango	1 kW
XHPFH-TV	6	Pisaflores	1 kW
XHTDA-TV	10	Tenango de Doria	1 kW
XHZAH-TV	5	Zacualtipan	1 kW
