= XHTAB-FM =

Radio station in Villahermosa, Tabasco, Mexico

- Villahermosa, Tabasco; Mexico
- Frequency: 95.7 FM
- Branding: Ya! FM

Programming
- Format: Pop
- Affiliations: Grupo Pazos

Ownership
- Owner: Radio Núcleo Comunicación Oro; (La Voz de Tabasco, S.A. de C.V.)
- Sister stations: XHVA-FM

History
- First air date: January 5, 1955 (concession)
- Call sign meaning: TABasco

Technical information
- ERP: 6 kW
- Transmitter coordinates: 17°59′06.16″N 92°56′15.77″W

Links
- Webcast: Listen live
- Website: ya.fm

XHTAB-FM is a radio station on 95.7 FM in Villahermosa, Tabasco, Mexico, known as Ya! FM with a pop format.

== History ==
XEXJ-AM 1410 received its concession on January 5, 1955. It was owned by Radio Televisora Tabasqueña, S.A. and broadcast with 5,000 watts day and 500 night. By the end of the 1960s, it had its current XETAB-AM calls. In the 1990s, it moved to 1050 kHz and increased its power to 10,000 watts day and 5,000 night.

XETAB migrated to FM in 2010.
