= XHKH-FM =

Radio station in Querétaro

- Querétaro, Querétaro; Mexico
- Frequency: 91.7 FM
- Branding: Top Music 91.7

Programming
- Format: Pop

Ownership
- Owner: Respuesta Radiofónica; (Impulsora Radiofónica de la Industria y el Comercio, S.A. de C.V.)

History
- First air date: May 26, 1988 (concession)

Technical information
- Class: B1
- ERP: 25 kW
- HAAT: 2.3 m
- Transmitter coordinates: 20°37′24.0″N 100°25′06.7″W

Links
- Website: topmusic.mx

XHKH-FM is a radio station on 91.7 FM in Querétaro, Querétaro. The station is owned by Respuesta Radiofónica and broadcasts a pop format known as Top Music 91.7 from a tower on Cerro del Tambor.

== History ==
XHKH began as XEKH-AM 1020, receiving its concession on May 26, 1988. It launched in August of that year as "Radio Centro 1020", the start of what would be the third major radio group to operate in Querétaro.
