= XHLLV-FM =

Tula, Hidalgo; Mexico
- Frequency: 89.3 MHz
- Branding: La Voz de los Atlantes

Programming
- Format: Public radio

Ownership
- Owner: Radio y Televisión de Hidalgo

History
- First air date: 1999
- Last air date: 2022

Technical information
- ERP: 1 kW
- HAAT: 190.07 m
- Transmitter coordinates: 20°01′03″N 99°17′27″W

Links
- Website: radioytelevision.hidalgo.gob.mx

XHLLV-FM was a radio station on 89.3 FM in Tula, Hidalgo, part of the Radio y Televisión de Hidalgo state radio network.

== History ==
XHLLV received its most recent permit in 1999.
