= XHPHBP-FM =

Radio station in Huauchinango, Puebla

- Huauchinango, Puebla; Mexico
- Frequency: 91.7 FM
- Branding: Ultra

Programming
- Format: Pop

Ownership
- Owner: Grupo Ultra; (Ultradigital Puebla, S.A. de C.V.)

History
- First air date: April 21, 2018
- Call sign meaning: Huauchinango-Beristáin Puebla

Technical information
- Class: A
- ERP: 3 kW
- HAAT: -103.1 m
- Transmitter coordinates: 20°10′27.9″N 98°03′15.3″W

XHPHBP-FM is a radio station on 91.7 FM in Huauchinango, Puebla, Mexico. It is owned by Grupo Ultra and carries its Ultra pop format.

== History ==
XHPHBP was awarded in the IFT-4 radio auction of 2017 and came to air with a formal inauguration on April 21, 2018.
