= WAVM =

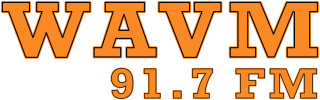
- Maynard, Massachusetts; United States
- Frequency: 91.7 MHz

Programming
- Format: High school radio

Ownership
- Owner: Maynard High School; (Maynard School Committee)

History
- First air date: April 1974

Technical information
- Licensing authority: FCC
- Facility ID: 40791
- Class: A
- ERP: 500 watts
- HAAT: 23.5 meters (77 ft)
- Transmitter coordinates: 42°25′17.3″N 71°27′8.2″W

Links
- Public license information: Public file; LMS
- Webcast: Listen live
- Website: wavm.org

WAVM (91.7 FM) is a high school radio station broadcasting from Maynard High School in Maynard, Massachusetts. Station programming provides the local area with news and church service broadcasts among other types of programming. Founded in 1973, WAVM has aided the careers of several of the school's successful alumni.

== Controversy ==
Long-time faculty administrator and station founder, teacher Joseph Magno, was arrested and charged with sexual assault in January 2006. Magno died in January 2007 of an apparent heart attack, just before his trial could begin.

== FCC licensing of frequency 91.7 ==
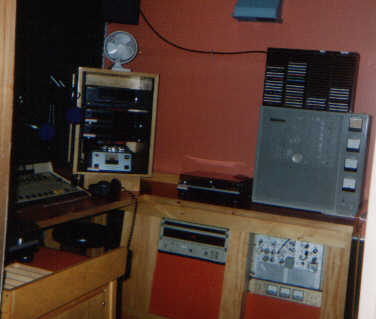
The station's studio in 1994. The 10-watt transmitter is the gray box on the counter.

For several years WAVM petitioned the Federal Communications Commission to increase the power of its signal from 10 watts to 500 watts. Per FCC regulations, and a tentative decision, the station's frequency had become available for bidding from other broadcasting companies, one of those companies being Living Proof Inc., a Christian broadcasting network headquartered in California that distributes programming to its affiliates via satellite, with minimal local programming.

Another interested party was University of Massachusetts Boston, operator of the WUMB network of radio stations. WAVM entered into an agreement with WUMB to jointly own the frequency and their partnership had appealed the FCC's decision.

Congressional Representative Marty Meehan and Senators John Kerry and Ted Kennedy all contributed their support to WAVM in the form of letters to the FCC, and the station's plight attracted national attention.

Eventually, the FCC reached a decision involving all parties, having asked them to come to an agreement. WAVM increased power from 10 to 500 watts and maintains its partnership with WUMB under a share-time agreement. WUMB's license for 91.7 was assigned the call sign WUMG. Both stations use the same transmitter facilities located behind Maynard High School, however each have their own license. Living Proof Inc. of California assigned their permit for 91.7 to Horizon Christian Fellowship on June 30, 2010. Their competing application, while still on 91.7, employs a very directional transmitting antenna to protect the signal from WAVM and WUMG's. The competing station, WTYN, signed in January 2012.

== Telethon ==
Every year WAVM hosts a telethon which donates money to those in need in the areas getting the Beacon newspaper. Taking place over one weekend in December, this is a 40-hour event, meaning that there are students working every hour of the night and day. There are normally six-seven telethon hosts, who stay up for the full 40 hours.

The tech crew in the Beacon Santa Telethon are hand selected by captains and the administration in WAVM. The tech crew is a group of highly trained individuals who coordinate the technical setup of the telethon, often getting more in-depth and intricate with the inner workings in the studio and auditorium. The group consists of 20-30 members varying on the year and is led by Trained Captains and a Head Tech.

The hosts are the on-air talent during the Telethon. Several students apply to be hosts but only a select few will get the position. The selection is based on involvement in WAVM and their ability to be professional during the Telethon. The Hosts do a majority of their work before the telethon. This work includes gathering monetary donations from businesses in the area, collecting auction items, and scheduling acts to help fill the air-time.

This telethon earns money for the poor and needy in many ways. Each staff member must raise at least 100 dollars in donations and pledges in order to stay overnight. Every donation of 25 dollars or more goes up on the Donor Board. An auction takes place up until one hour before the end of the telethon, with hundreds of items being bid on.

Along with auctions, local bands and other talents perform. Popular acts that tend to reappear The Maynard Community Band, Christmas Carol singing, and Mrs. Clause reading a story to children, Mr.Vic singing to children, Hosts vs Tech Crew, various food challenges.

The Grand Finale takes place at noon on Sunday, where the hosts thank the sponsors, donors, and parent volunteers, and reveal the grand total, which they are always striving to get higher than the previous year. The Telethon raises anywhere between $28,000 and $40,000 depending on the economy for needy families of surrounding communities so that they can have a proper Christmas.

== Television ==
WAVM airs original student content once to three times a week. Broadcasts often air for one hour during 6-9 p.m. ET. Student television programs include Manly Cooking and Dining Divas. Manly Cooking is normally hosted by four male talent where they do crazy food challenges such as Ghost Pepper Pasta or Mystery Burgers. Dining Divas is a cooking show involving four on-air female talent where they make food such as grilled cheese, French toast, eggs, and more traditional recipes then those of Manly Cooking.

Previously aired television shows in WAVM include The Elusive Moose and Arcade. These shows have been discontinued by the students and have no further plans of being revitalized. The programs air on Channel 8 on Comcast Xfinity, and Channel 28 on Verizon Fios.

== Radio ==
WAVM broadcasts stereo radio from 2-9 p.m. ET on 91.7 FM for five days a week during the Maynard High School school year. The radio shows are run by students for an hour once a week. The students choose music and topics and have fun on the air. Radio shows are offered to students in the 6th-12th grades in the Maynard school systems. In addition, WAVM also offers live radio recordings of church services.

== Fundraising ==
WAVM offers a wide range of fundraising for the students in the club. Fundraising opportunities include The Mother son Luao, The Father-Daughter Dance, and selling raffle tickets. Each event is widely popular in Maynard and garners a significant amount of revenue that awards several seniors hundreds of dollars in scholarships, the scholarships are for dedicated seniors in the program. Fundraising money also goes to the general upkeep of the station and additional technical equipment.
