= KBLD =

- Kennewick, Washington; United States
- Broadcast area: Tri-Cities
- Frequency: 91.7 MHz

Programming
- Format: Teaching and Contemporary Christian Music

Ownership
- Owner: Calvary Chapel of Tri-Cities; (Calvary Chapel of Tri-Cities)

History
- First air date: 1994
- Former call signs: KAIS (9/1994-11/1994)
- Call sign meaning: K BoLD

Technical information
- Licensing authority: FCC
- Facility ID: 8411
- Class: C3
- ERP: 1,800 watts
- HAAT: 296 meters

Links
- Public license information: Public file; LMS
- Webcast: Listen Live
- Website: kbld.com

KBLD (91.7 FM) is a radio station broadcasting a Contemporary Christian format. Licensed to Kennewick, Washington, United States, the station serves the Tri-Cities area. The station is currently owned by Calvary Chapel Tri-Cities

== History ==
The station was assigned the call sign KAIS on 1994-09-30. On 1994-11-14, the station changed its call sign to the current KBLD.

In January 2009, CSN International reached an agreement to sell this station to. The deal was approved by the FCC on March 13, 2009, and as of May 6, 2009 ownership transferred to Calvary Chapel of Tri-Cities
