= KFHL =

- Wasco, California; United States
- Broadcast area: Bakersfield, California
- Frequency: 91.7 MHz

Programming
- Format: Christian radio

Ownership
- Owner: Mary V. Harris Foundation

History
- First air date: 2005
- Call sign meaning: "Keep Faith Hope & Love"

Technical information
- Licensing authority: FCC
- Facility ID: 89679
- Class: A
- ERP: 6,000 watts
- HAAT: 73 meters (240 ft)
- Transmitter coordinates: 35°24′55″N 119°14′1″W

Links
- Public license information: Public file; LMS
- Webcast: Listen live
- Website: kfhlradio.com

KFHL (91.7 FM) is a non-commercial radio station licensed to Wasco, California, United States, and serving the Bakersfield metropolitan area. It airs a Christian format and is owned by the Mary V. Harris Foundation.

== History ==
While it was still a construction permit, the unbuilt station was assigned the KFHL call letters on February 7, 2003. It took a couple of years to complete the station's transmitter and studios. It signed on the air in 2005.

The station was originally owned by the Hillcrest Seventh-day Adventist Church. It later was transferred to the Mary V. Harris Foundation.
