= KNEO =

Radio station in Neosho–Joplin, Missouri

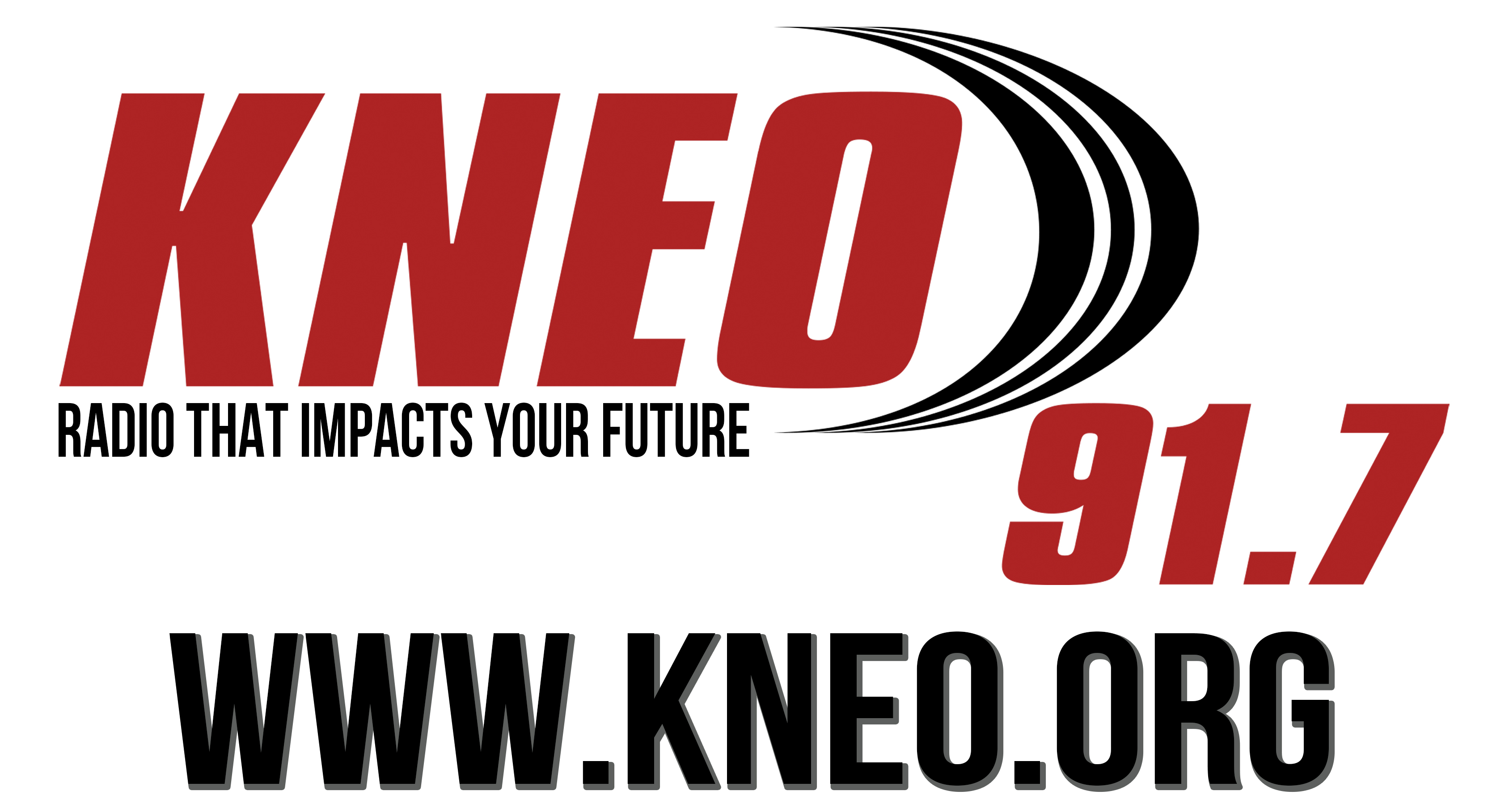
- Neosho, Missouri; United States
- Broadcast area: Joplin, Missouri
- Frequency: 91.7 MHz
- Branding: The Word

Programming
- Format: Christian Radio

Ownership
- Owner: Sky High Broadcasting Corporation

History
- First air date: October 1986

Technical information
- Licensing authority: FCC
- Facility ID: 331
- Class: C3
- ERP: 14,000 watts
- HAAT: 114 meters (374 ft)
- Transmitter coordinates: 36°52′49″N 94°27′00″W

Links
- Public license information: Public file; LMS
- Webcast: Listen Live
- Website: http://www.kneo.org/

KNEO (91.7 FM) is a Christian radio station licensed to Neosho, Missouri, serving the Joplin, Missouri area. The station is owned by Sky High Broadcasting Corporation.

== Programming ==
KNEO's programming includes Christian talk and teaching shows including; Truth for Life with Alistair Begg, Running to Win with Erwin Lutzer, Grace to You with John MacArthur, In Touch with Dr. Charles Stanley, and Thru the Bible with J. Vernon McGee, Insight for Living with Chuck Swindoll, Enjoying Everyday Life with Joyce Meyer, and Focus On The Family.

== History ==
KNEO began broadcasting in October 1986 and originally broadcast at 91.5 MHz, and operated only 12 hours a day, broadcasting with 380 watts, from a 70-foot tower. The station began full-time operations the following year. In November 1994, KNEO's frequency was changed to 91.7 MHz and began broadcasting with 2,760 watts of power, at its current tower's location. In 2002, following the technical failure of some of its equipment, KNEO's power was increased to 4,600 watts. In 2008, the station's power was increased to the currently licensed ERP of 14,000 watts. In 2023, the station built a freestanding tower to replace its 2nd tower (the 1st 340 foot tower). A documentary film was produced that detailed the new tower's construction.
