= WVMW-FM =

Scranton, Pennsylvania; United States
- Broadcast area: Scranton
- Frequency: 91.7 MHz

Programming
- Format: Variety

Ownership
- Owner: Marywood University

Technical information
- Licensing authority: FCC
- Facility ID: 40634
- Class: A
- ERP: 2,000 watts
- HAAT: -87.0 meters
- Transmitter coordinates: 41°25′57.00″N 75°38′6.00″W

Links
- Public license information: Public file; LMS
- Website: WVMW Web Page

WVMW-FM (91.7 FM) is a radio station licensed to Scranton, Pennsylvania, United States, the station serves the Scranton area. The station, which celebrated its 50th anniversary in 2024, is owned by Marywood University.
