= KIBH-FM =

- Seward, Alaska; United States
- Frequency: 91.7 MHz
- Branding: Seward Public Radio

Programming
- Format: Community radio

Ownership
- Owner: Kenai Mountains Public Media, Inc.

Technical information
- Licensing authority: FCC
- Facility ID: 176521
- Class: A
- ERP: 1,000 watts
- HAAT: −498 metres (−1,634 ft)
- Transmitter coordinates: 60°09′40.2″N 149°23′36″W
- Translators: K241CD (96.1 MHz, Moose Pass); K246CD (97.1 MHz, Moose Pass); K291CP (106.1 MHz, Bear Creek)

Links
- Public license information: Public file; LMS
- Webcast: Listen live
- Website: www.sewardpublic.org

KIBH-FM (91.7 FM, "Seward Public Radio") is a radio station licensed to serve the community of Seward, Alaska. The station is owned by Kenai Mountains Public Media, Inc., and airs a community radio format.

The station was assigned the KIBH-FM call letters by the Federal Communications Commission on August 25, 2009.
