= WTYN (FM) =

- Lunenburg, Massachusetts; United States
- Broadcast area: Worcester, Massachusetts
- Frequency: 91.7 MHz
- Branding: RenewFM

Programming
- Format: Christian
- Network: RenewFM

Ownership
- Owner: Horizon Christian Fellowship
- Sister stations: WCMX; WFGL; WJWT

History
- First air date: January 2012

Technical information
- Licensing authority: FCC
- Facility ID: 122297
- Class: A
- ERP: 1,000 watts
- HAAT: 12 meters (39 ft)
- Transmitter coordinates: 42°35′40.3″N 71°40′8.2″W

Links
- Public license information: Public file; LMS
- Website: www.renewfm.org

WTYN (91.7 FM) is a radio station airing a Christian format licensed to serve Lunenburg, Massachusetts. The station is owned by Horizon Christian Fellowship and is an affiliate of RenewFM. WTYN's programming consists of Christian music and Christian talk and teaching programs such as Turning Point with David Jeremiah, and Truth for Life with Alistair Begg. The allocation of 91.7 to Lunenburg follows a long drawn out dispute involving WAVM, University of Massachusetts Boston (owner of WUMB-FM, whose Stow repeater WUMG started during this time and shares time with WAVM), and Living Proof, Inc (the original applicant of what became WTYN).

== See also ==
- RenewFM
