= WSUW =

- Whitewater, Wisconsin; United States
- Broadcast area: Whitewater, Wisconsin; Fort Atkinson, Wisconsin
- Frequency: 91.7 MHz
- Branding: The Edge

Programming
- Format: Alternative

Ownership
- Owner: Board of Regents, University of Wisconsin System

History
- First air date: 1966
- Call sign meaning: Wisconsin State University at Whitewater

Technical information
- Licensing authority: FCC
- Facility ID: 4284
- Class: A
- ERP: 1,300 watts
- HAAT: 55.0 meters
- Transmitter coordinates: 42°50′10.00″N 88°44′36.00″W

Links
- Public license information: Public file; LMS
- Webcast: Listen live
- Website: Official website

WSUW (91.7 FM) is a college radio station licensed to the Board of Regents, University of Wisconsin System. The station, which broadcasts an Alternative format, serves the Whitewater and Fort Atkinson areas.

== History ==
WSUW has been broadcasting from the UW-Whitewater campus since 1966.
