= KRMC =

Christian radio station in Douglas, Arizona

- Douglas, Arizona; United States
- Frequency: 91.7 MHz
- Branding: Radio Cadena Manantial

Programming
- Language: Spanish
- Format: Christian radio

Ownership
- Owner: World Radio Network, Inc.

History
- First air date: 1997

Technical information
- Licensing authority: FCC
- Facility ID: 73757
- Class: A
- ERP: 3,000 watts
- HAAT: 72.0 meters (236.2 ft)
- Transmitter coordinates: 31°20′57″N 109°28′48″W

Links
- Public license information: Public file; LMS
- Website: KRMC website

KRMC (91.7 FM) is a Spanish language Christian radio station licensed to Douglas, Arizona. KRMC is owned by World Radio Network, Inc.
