= WTYN (AM) =

- Tryon, North Carolina; United States
- Frequency: 1160 kHz

Programming
- Format: News, Music

History
- First air date: October 1, 1954

Technical information
- Power: 10000 watts day/ 500 night

WTYN was a small AM radio station covering Tryon, North Carolina. WTYN was founded by Graves and Gertrude Taylor and Fanning Hearon, all of Tryon and Spartanburg, South Carolina. The station first went on the air in 1954, on 1550 kHz, broadcasting to the Tryon, Columbus, Landrum (SC) area. For the first 30 years Ace Rickenbacker was a well known fixture along with Fanning Hearon, and later on, Bill Dobbin. During the 1950s and early 1960s high school guys, among them Fred Taylor, Charlie Fishburne, Mike McGuinn, "Chip" Leonard and Johnny Lineberger livened things up on the weekends and provided broadcasts of church services and little league baseball games. In the late 1960s and early 1970s Les Hunt, Mike Leonard and Charlie Whitmire assisted on the air. WTYN mostly played variety, news, etc. In 1981 WTYN moved to a more hit oriented Top 40 format, bringing in Bill Prather from WHVL in Hendersonville as Operations Manager. Ace Rickenbacker was still the morning man. Others came in for the various shifts, like Chris Smart, Jay Nolan, Mark Pellatt, Dave Lyons, Chuck Finley, and Bob and James Henson. In 1984 after many years of planning, WTYN moved to 1160 with 10,000 watts during the daytime, and 500 at night.

"Fast Freddie" Taylor went on to a distinguished 36-year career as an iconic and pioneering reporter at TV station WRAL in Raleigh, North Carolina. From 1984 to 1999 Charlie Fishburne worked as the main anchor at TV station WTVR in Richmond, VA. and founded Charles Fishburne (video) Productions, headquartered in Richmond.
