= WBMR =

Radio station in Telford, Pennsylvania

Coordinates: 40.3135°N 75.2910°W

- Telford, Pennsylvania; United States
- Broadcast area: Philadelphia metropolitan area
- Frequency: 91.7 MHz

Programming
- Format: Christian radio
- Affiliations: VCY America Radio Network

Ownership
- Owner: United Ministries

History
- Call sign meaning: Bucks-Montgomery Radio

Technical information
- Licensing authority: FCC
- Facility ID: 68857
- Class: A
- ERP: 125 watts horiz 500 watts vert
- HAAT: 77 meters (253 ft)

Links
- Public license information: Public file; LMS

WBMR is a radio station located in Telford, Pennsylvania, United States, that broadcasts to the Philadelphia area. WBMR specializes in religious musical programming. It is an affiliate of the VCY America Radio Network. The callsign stands for BuxMont Radio as its community of license, the borough of Telford, straddles the Bucks and Montgomery county boundary.
