= The Harvard Voice =

- Frequency: Monthly
- First issue: April 2008
- Country: USA
- Based in: Cambridge, Massachusetts
- Website: The Harvard Voice

The Harvard Voice is a monthly magazine (formerly weekly paper) concerned with the life, culture, ideas, and style of Harvard University. It is an official student publication at Harvard, which was started by Steven Duque and Miran Pavić, in April 2008. Its launch was heralded as "campus journalism goes 2.0." Other local websites covered the launch as well.

== Faculty sponsors and writers ==
The Voice's academic sponsors included Professor James Engell, the head of Harvard's English Department, and sociology professor Jason Kaufman. One-time contributors who have since not written for the Voice include Professor Kaufman, Senior Lecturer Tim McCarthy, and Adam Goldenberg, who was named one of the top 100 college writers in the U.S. in 2008.

== Partnerships ==
The Voice has partnered with a number of local businesses such as the Boloco chain of restaurants, the Harvard Coop, the Tannery, the election website Votegopher.com, and B-good, the Boston fast-food chain.

== Criticism and controversy ==
In a November 2008 op-ed, Harvard Crimson writer Garrett Nelson denounced the Voice as "a résumé-filler wrapped in a vanity publication", adding that it suffers from " a superficial showmanship and a prevailing laziness," and making the case it's only around due to its vast "access to money."

In September 2009, the magazine was accused of stalking actress Emma Watson, who attended Brown University, during a football match. In an interview with The Harvard Crimson, Voice editor-in-chief called these accusations a "fabrication." The magazine has since undergone structural changes to ensure the highest satisfaction among readers.

== Notable articles ==
In the inaugural issue, Professor Kaufman offered a sharp critique of Harvard's curriculum and tenure policy, claiming the "students are not getting the classes they want, and need."
