= KMVC =

- Marshall, Missouri; United States
- Frequency: 91.7 MHz
- Branding: The V

Programming
- Language: English
- Format: College

Ownership
- Owner: Missouri Valley University

History
- First air date: November 1, 1968
- Former call signs: KNOS (1968–1992)
- Call sign meaning: Missouri Valley College

Technical information
- Licensing authority: FCC
- Facility ID: 43227
- Class: A
- ERP: 100 watts (vertical)
- HAAT: 19 meters (62 ft)
- Transmitter coordinates: 39°06′31″N 93°11′29″W

Links
- Public license information: Public file; LMS

KMVC (91.7 FM, "The V") is an American non-commercial educational radio station licensed to serve the community of Marshall, Missouri. The station, established in 1968 as KNOS, is owned and operated by Missouri Valley University.

It broadcasts a college radio format.

The station was assigned the call sign KMVC by the U.S. Federal Communications Commission (FCC) on October 5, 1992.
