= WAPB =

- Madison, Florida; United States
- Frequency: 91.7 MHz

Ownership
- Owner: Public Radio, Inc.

Technical information
- Licensing authority: FCC
- Facility ID: 87426
- Class: A
- ERP: 200 watts
- HAAT: 68.2 meters
- Transmitter coordinates: 30°27′13.00″N 83°24′17.00″W

Links
- Public license information: Public file; LMS

WAPB (91.7 FM) is a radio station licensed to Madison, Florida, USA. The station is currently owned by Public Radio, Inc.
