= KBNJ =

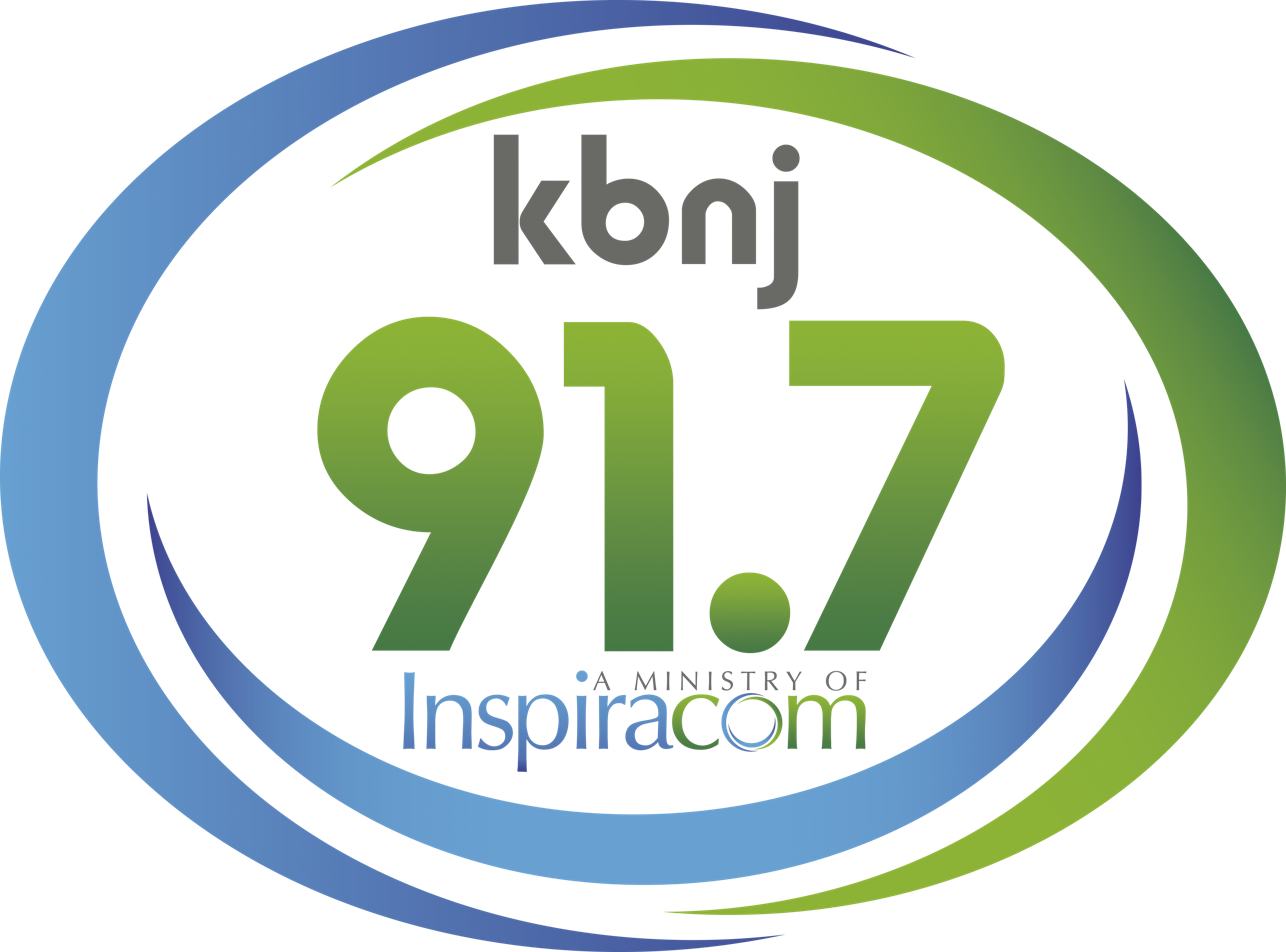
- LOGO KBNJ
- Corpus Christi, Texas; United States
- Frequency: 91.7 MHz
- Branding: Life Changing

Programming
- Format: Christian adult contemporary

Ownership
- Owner: World Radio Network, Inc.

History
- First air date: 1985
- Former call signs: KQIV (1979–1983); KFLB (1983–1984)

Technical information
- Licensing authority: FCC
- Facility ID: 73748
- Class: C3
- ERP: 6,100 watts
- HAAT: 169 meters (554 ft)
- Transmitter coordinates: 27°45′23″N 97°36′25″W

Links
- Public license information: Public file; LMS
- Webcast: Listen live
- Website: Official website

KBNJ (91.7 FM, "Life Changing") is a radio station broadcasting a Christian adult contemporary format. Licensed to Corpus Christi, Texas, United States, the station is currently owned by World Radio Network, Inc.

== History ==
The Federal Communications Commission issued a construction permit for the station on June 12, 1979. The station was assigned the call sign KQIV on August 13, 1979. On July 27, 1983, the station changed its call sign to KFLB, and on July 18, 1984, to the current KBNJ. On April 25, 1985, the station received its license to cover.
