= KMNO =

- Wailuku, Hawaii; United States
- Frequency: 91.7 MHz
- Branding: Mana'o Radio

Programming
- Format: Variety
- Affiliations: National Federation of Community Broadcasters

Ownership
- Owner: Maui Media Initiative, Inc.

Technical information
- Licensing authority: FCC
- Facility ID: 174896
- Class: C1
- ERP: 1,200 watts
- HAAT: 935 metres (3,068 ft)
- Transmitter coordinates: 20°46′31″N 156°14′49″W

Links
- Public license information: Public file; LMS
- Webcast: Listen Live
- Website: Official Website

KMNO (91.7 FM) is a community radio station licensed to Wailuku, Hawaii. The station is owned by Maui Media Initiative, Inc. It airs a variety radio format.

The station was assigned the KMNO call letters by the Federal Communications Commission on August 1, 2012.
