= WTHA (FM) =

Radio station in Berlin, New Jersey

Simulcasts WRDV, Warminster, Pennsylvania
- Berlin, New Jersey; United States
- Frequency: 88.1 MHz

Programming
- Format: Big band; doo wop; oldies

Ownership
- Owner: Bux-Mont Educational Radio Association
- Sister stations: WRDV; WLBS

History
- First air date: August 21, 1992
- Former call signs: WNJS-FM (1991–2023)

Technical information
- Licensing authority: FCC
- Facility ID: 48486
- Class: A
- ERP: 1 watt horizontal; 80 watts vertical
- HAAT: 287 m (942 ft)
- Transmitter coordinates: 39°43′41.4″N 74°50′37.6″W

Links
- Public license information: Public file; LMS
- Webcast: Listen live
- Website: www.wrdv.org

WTHA (88.1 FM) is a radio station licensed to Berlin, New Jersey. The station is owned by Bux-Mont Educational Radio Association, and simulcasts the public radio programming of WRDV in Warminster, Pennsylvania.

== History ==
The station went on the air August 21, 1992, as WNJS-FM, a public radio station owned and operated by the New Jersey Network (NJN). NJN's radio network began operation May 20, 1991, when WNJT-FM in Trenton signed on. Eight other stations would be established over the following seventeen years.

On June 6, 2011, the New Jersey Public Broadcasting Authority agreed to sell five FM stations in southern New Jersey to WHYY, Inc. The transaction was announced by Governor Chris Christie, as part of his long-term goal to end State-subsidized public broadcasting. WHYY assumed control of the stations through a management agreement on July 1, 2011, pending Federal Communications Commission (FCC) approval for the acquisition; at that point, the stations began to carry the schedule of WHYY-FM in Philadelphia.

In March 2023, WHYY announced that it would sell WNJS-FM to the Bux-Mont Educational Radio Association, which owns WRDV, for $110,000. The sale was completed on June 15, 2023, and the WTHA call sign was assigned by the FCC on June 20.
