= WJWT =

RenewFM radio station in Gardner, Massachusetts

- Gardner, Massachusetts; United States
- Broadcast area: Worcester, Massachusetts
- Frequency: 91.7 MHz
- Branding: RenewFM

Programming
- Format: Christian
- Network: RenewFM

Ownership
- Owner: Horizon Christian Fellowship
- Sister stations: WCMX; WFGL; WTYN

History
- First air date: 2006

Technical information
- Licensing authority: FCC
- Facility ID: 122204
- Class: A
- ERP: 850 watts
- HAAT: 84 meters (276 ft)
- Transmitter coordinates: 42°33′29.3″N 72°3′4.3″W

Links
- Public license information: Public file; LMS
- Website: www.renewfm.org

WJWT (91.7 FM) is a radio station airing a Christian format licensed to serve Gardner, Massachusetts. The station is owned by Horizon Christian Fellowship and is an affiliate of RenewFM. WJWT's programming consists of Christian music and Christian talk and teaching programs such as Turning Point with David Jeremiah, and Truth for Life with Alistair Begg. WJWT was previously owned by CSN International and derived a portion of its programming from the Calvary Satellite Network.

The station was assigned the WJWT callsign by the Federal Communications Commission on July 9, 2003.
