= WEGS =

Coordinates: 30°37′20″N 87°05′12″W

- Milton, Florida; United States
- Broadcast area: Pensacola, Florida
- Frequency: 91.7 MHz

Programming
- Format: Christian radio

Ownership
- Owner: Florida Public Radio, Inc.

History
- Call sign meaning: We Encourage God's Servants

Technical information
- Licensing authority: FCC
- Facility ID: 21792
- Class: C3
- ERP: 20,000 watts
- HAAT: 112 meters (367 ft)

Links
- Public license information: Public file; LMS
- Website: www.917online.com

WEGS is a Christian radio station licensed to Milton, Florida, broadcasting on 91.7 FM. The station serves the Pensacola, Florida area and is owned by Florida Public Radio, Inc.
