= Radio Mezquital =

Radio Mezquital (XHCPDX-FM)
- Ixmiquilpan, Hidalgo; Mexico
- Frequency: 96.5 MHz

Programming
- Format: Public radio

Ownership
- Owner: Radio y Televisión de Hidalgo

History
- First air date: March 27, 1963
- Former call signs: XHD-FM (1963-2022)
- Call sign meaning: Sequential call sign for a public concession

Technical information
- Class: C
- ERP: 5.06 kW
- HAAT: 1014.14 m
- Transmitter coordinates: 20°37′31.5″N 99°17′24.9″W

Links
- Website: radioytelevision.hidalgo.gob.mx

Radio Mezquital (call sign XHCPDX-FM) is a radio station on 96.5 FM in Ixmiquilpan, Hidalgo, Mexico, part of the Radio y Televisión de Hidalgo state radio network. The station went on the air as XHD-FM in 1963 and was originally operated by the government agency Patrimonio Indígena del Valle de Mezquital. The state government absorbed XHD-FM and the other stations owned by the group in 1995.

== History ==
On March 27, 1963, the public agency Patrimonio Indígena del Valle de Mezquital signed on its first radio station, XHD-FM, with a formal inauguration by President Adolfo López Mateos. Operating on 96.5 MHz, XHD-FM was Hidalgo's first FM radio station (and the first radio station to operate in Ixmiquilpan); it also was the first radio school program in Mexico, broadcasting programming for the Mezquital Otomí population.

In 1975, XEZG-AM was permitted. XEZG offered programming targeted at a rural audience, while XHD sought to serve a more urban population. 1982 saw PIVM's radio holdings expand even further, with new AM stations at Tlachinol and Huejutla de Reyes (also now part of RTH). The name of the organization had changed to Patrimonio Indígena del Valle de Mezquital y la Huasteca Hidalguense (PIVMHH), and the station was known as Radio Mezquital y Huasteca Hidalguense.

On January 8, 1991, PIVMHH was liquidated. The radio stations were absorbed by the state government in 1995.

XEZG was cleared to migrate to FM in 2012 as XHZG-FM 94.9, though it would be years before it came into operation. XHZG and XHD simulcast, with 94.9 being receivable in Ixmiquilpan proper and 96.5 in the surrounding rural area.

As a result of an omission by the state government of Hidalgo, the concessions for the entire Hidalgo state radio network were not renewed when they expired, and stations including XHD and XHZG left the air on November 28, 2022. Though an application was made for a new concession to replace XHD-FM, the Federal Telecommunications Institute did not rule on the application until 2024, when it awarded the Ixmiquilpan frequency to the state and the former XHHUI-FM frequency in Huichapan to the Universidad Autónoma del Estado de Hidalgo, which had also sought the Ixmiquilpan allotment.
