= XHVA-FM =

Radio station in Villahermosa, Tabasco

- Villahermosa, Tabasco; Mexico
- Frequency: 91.7 FM
- Branding: XEVA

Programming
- Format: News/talk

Ownership
- Owner: Grupo Pazos; (Radio Tabasco, S.A.)

History
- First air date: May 11, 1960 (concession)

Technical information
- ERP: 25 kW
- Transmitter coordinates: 17°59′06.16″N 92°56′15.77″W

Links
- Webcast: Listen live
- Website: xeva.com.mx

XHVA-FM is a radio station on 91.7 FM in Villahermosa, Tabasco, Mexico, known as XEVA (its former AM callsign).

== History ==
XEVA-AM 790 received its concession on May 11, 1960. It operated with 5,000 watts day and 200 night until the 1990s, when it ramped up power to 25,000 watts day and 5,000 night.

XEVA was cleared to migrate to FM in June 2010 as XHVA-FM 91.7.
