= WLBS =

Simulcasting WRDV, Warminster
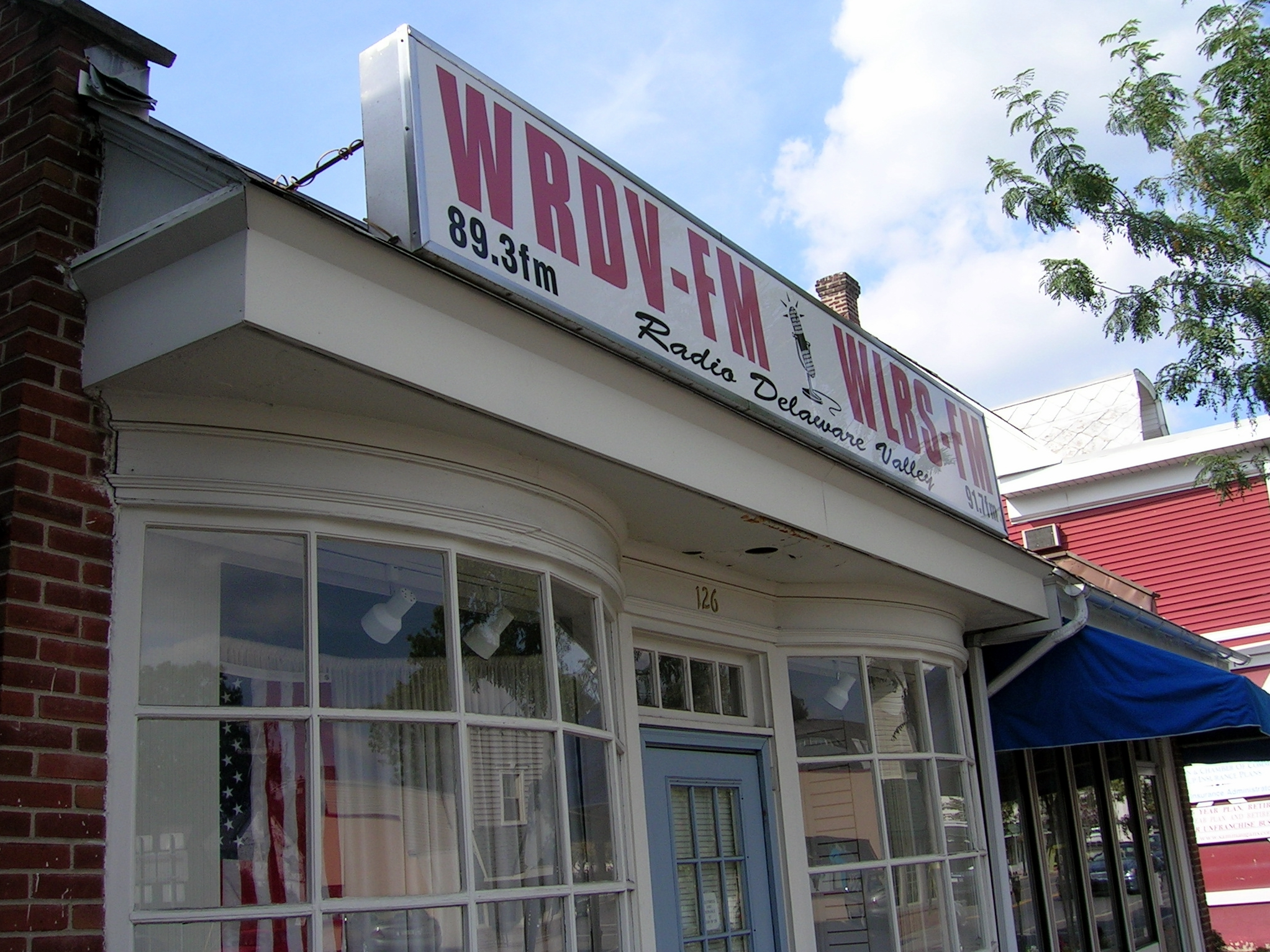
- Bristol, Pennsylvania; United States
- Frequency: 91.7 MHz
- Branding: Radio in the Delaware Valley

Programming
- Format: Big band; doo wop; oldies

Ownership
- Owner: Bux-Mont Educational Radio Association
- Sister stations: WRDV

History
- First air date: 1997
- Former call signs: WAJH (1994–1997)

Technical information
- Facility ID: 7923
- Class: A
- ERP: 100 watts
- HAAT: 21 meters (69 ft)
- Transmitter coordinates: 40°9′33.3″N 74°51′22.5″W

Links
- Webcast: Listen live
- Website: wrdv.org

WLBS (91.7 FM, "Radio in the Delaware Valley") is a radio station broadcasting a big band/doo wop/oldies music format, simulcasting WRDV 89.3 FM Warminster. Licensed to Bristol, Pennsylvania, the station is owned by Bux-Mont Educational Radio Association.
