= WMWM =

Radio station at Salem State University

- Salem, Massachusetts; United States
- Broadcast area: Salem State University
- Frequency: 91.7 MHz
- Branding: WMWM 91.7 FM

Programming
- Format: Variety

Ownership
- Owner: Salem State University; (Salem State College Board of Trustees)

History
- First air date: 1976
- Last air date: February 2025

Technical information
- Licensing authority: FCC
- Facility ID: 58636
- Class: A
- ERP: 130 watts
- HAAT: 24 meters (79 ft)
- Transmitter coordinates: 42°30′14.3″N 70°53′24.1″W

Links
- Public license information: Public file; LMS

WMWM was a non-commercial radio station at 91.7 MHz in Salem, Massachusetts, licensed to Salem State University. The station was founded as WSSC AM 640 (carrier current) in 1968 and became WMWM at 91.7 FM in 1976 with a power of 10 watts. Power was increased to 130 watts in 1980.

The station featured alternative rock with specialty shows. It broadcast 24 hours a day utilizing computerized automation playlists when a live DJ was not available.

WMWM went silent in February 2025 after its transmitter malfunctioned. Instead of returning the station to the air, Salem State University surrendered the station's license that August.

In March of 2026, the station's general manager announced WMWM was back but would only be available through digital streaming.

== Notable former WMWM disc jockeys ==
Among the past DJs of WMWM are: Anngelle Wood, now with WZLX in Boston; Esoteric (rapper) of the hip-hop duo 7L & Esoteric; Jay Brown on air personality at WKAF 97.7 The Beat; Curtis Atchinson, Owner of SoundGroove Records (Midnight Society); Chris Kennedy, now with Beasley Media in Boston; and cartoonists Keith Knight (The Knight Life) and Mark Parisi (Off the Mark). Longtime DJ "Cosmic" Amanda Guest founded community radio station BFF.fm in San Francisco, CA.

Two of the station's legendary on air DJs were Scott Merrill Mezansky (AKA Mike Elliott) and Bob Nelson (died Jan 4, 2025). Scott hosted a soft rock/oldies show from 1978–1987. Scott also served as the station's News Director from 1978-1981. Bob, was with North of Boston Radio, and had been a DJ since 1981, establishing the long running Juke Joint show. Another longtime DJ, Shaun Hayes, played jazz and progressive talk shows and was with the station for over 15 years. Hayes died on May 12, 2013. Also some DJs of note were Joe DiFranco also known as "Hank the Engineer" Also, Stephen Lochiatto who hosted several radio programs including punk, rock and jazz as well as broadcasting Salem State Basketball and Hockey games with John Clemeno and John Caron who also hosted several outstanding radio programs. Pam Kavanagh also a well known on air personality as well as being the stations General Manager.

Doug Mascott hosted local music program "Trax of the Town" from 1999 until his death in March 2014.

== See also ==
- Campus radio
- List of college radio stations in the United States
