= WEMC =

- Harrisonburg, Virginia; United States
- Broadcast area: Harrisonburg, Virginia; Rockingham County, Virginia
- Frequency: 91.7 MHz
- Branding: WEMC 91.7

Programming
- Format: Classical music

Ownership
- Owner: Board of Trustees of Eastern Mennonite University
- Operator: James Madison University

History
- First air date: 1955
- Call sign meaning: Eastern Mennonite College

Technical information
- Licensing authority: FCC
- Facility ID: 4308
- Class: A
- ERP: 1,850 watts
- HAAT: 58 meters (190 ft)
- Transmitter coordinates: 38°28′20.0″N 78°52′57.0″W

Links
- Public license information: Public file; LMS
- Webcast: WEMC Webstream
- Website: WEMC Online

WEMC (91.7 FM) is a classical music formatted broadcast radio station licensed to Harrisonburg, Virginia, serving Harrisonburg and Rockingham County, Virginia. WEMC is owned by Eastern Mennonite University and operated by James Madison University.

Due to declining listenership and low student involvement, James Madison University's WMRA (90.7 FM) took over operation of WEMC on January 14, 2008. WMRA moved its morning, midday, and late-night classical music blocks to WEMC in exchange for NPR's Talk of the Nation and Fresh Air, which had been heard on WEMC as WMRA was unable to fit them into its schedule. Both stations preserved their evening schedules, as WMRA was hesitant to eliminate its evening music programming due to WEMC's inferior signal.

WEMC dropped its last remaining information programs, Democracy Now! and rebroadcasts of the BBC World Service, on August 11, 2014. The station now broadcasts classical music throughout the week.

There are local hosts only on Monday and Friday evening ("Bob's Record Shelf" and "Heifetz On Air", the latter featuring students and alumni of the Heifetz International Music Institute in Staunton), with the rest of the music largely coming from the syndicated Classical 24. The only exceptions to the classical format are on Sunday mornings: two broadcasts of St. Olaf College's Sing for Joy, featuring sacred choral music, and a live broadcast of the service from Park View Mennonite Church in Harrisonburg.
