= WMRY =

- Crozet, Virginia; United States
- Broadcast area: Charlottesville, Virginia; Albemarle County, Virginia; Nelson County, Virginia
- Frequency: 103.5 MHz
- Branding: WMRA

Programming
- Format: Public Radio
- Affiliations: American Public Media; BBC World Service; NPR; Public Radio International

Ownership
- Owner: James Madison University; (James Madison University Board of Visitors)
- Sister stations: WMRA, WMRL

History
- First air date: May 1995
- Call sign meaning: W (James) Madison Radio Y

Technical information
- Licensing authority: FCC
- Facility ID: 6130
- Class: A
- Power: 280 watts
- HAAT: 446 meters (1,463 ft)
- Transmitter coordinates: 37°57′2.0″N 78°43′46.0″W

Links
- Public license information: Public file; LMS
- Webcast: Listen Live
- Website: WMRY Online

WMRY (103.5 FM) is a Public Radio formatted broadcast radio station licensed to Crozet, Virginia, serving the Independent City of Charlottesville along with Albemarle and Nelson counties in Virginia. WMRY is owned and operated by James Madison University in Harrisonburg and is a full-time satellite of WMRA in Harrisonburg. Its existence is only noted in WMRA's legal IDs.

Previous logo
