= WMCN (FM) =

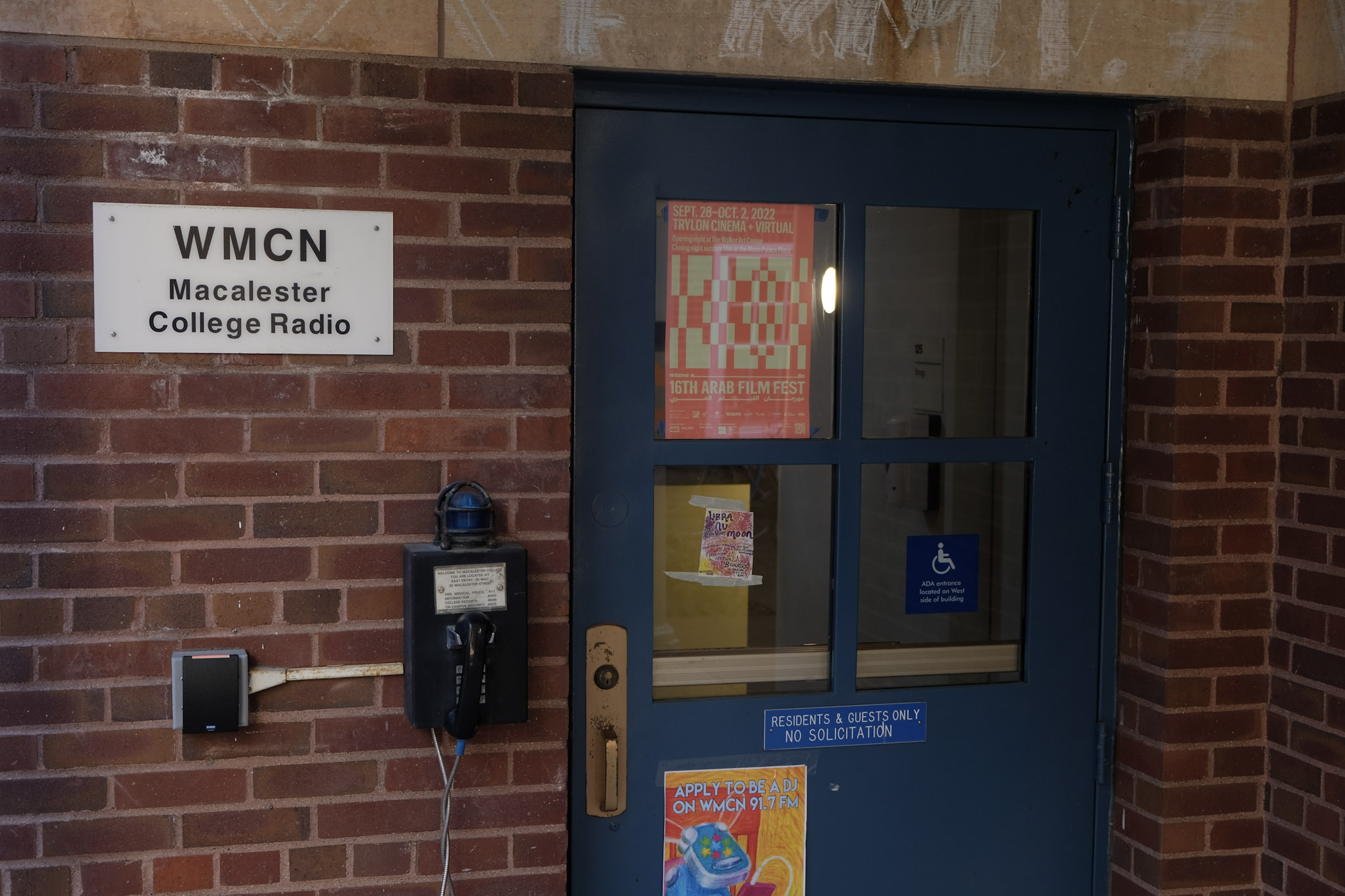
- WMCN offices
- St. Paul, Minnesota; United States
- Frequency: 91.7 MHz
- Branding: Macalester College Radio

Programming
- Format: Variety

Ownership
- Owner: Macalester College

History
- First air date: 1980
- Former call signs: KJAB (1979)
- Call sign meaning: Macalester College

Technical information
- Licensing authority: FCC
- Facility ID: 39535
- Class: D
- ERP: 5 watts
- HAAT: 49 meters (161 ft)
- Transmitter coordinates: 44°56′18.8″N 93°10′4.7″W

Links
- Public license information: Public file; LMS
- Webcast: Listen live
- Website: www.wmcn.fm

WMCN (91.7 FM) is a radio station broadcasting a variety format. Licensed to St. Paul, Minnesota, United States, the station serves an area relatively close to the Macalester College campus. The station is owned by Macalester and operated by students. It has held the WMCN call sign since July 30, 1979.

Located in the Macalester-Groveland neighborhood of Saint Paul, Minnesota, WMCN is a low-power station with a broadcast radius of roughly 2.5 to 3 miles.

== History ==
This station was granted a final extension to its original construction permit by the Federal Communications Commission (FCC) on June 20, 1979. The new station was assigned the call sign KJAB by the FCC but this was changed to WMCN on July 30, 1979. The station received its broadcast license from the FCC on April 1, 1980.

== Programming ==
The freeform programming is hosted by student disc jockeys and the station operates primarily during the school's terms, with less-regular programming over summer break. Students are required to complete training sessions to familiarize themselves with the station's music library, policies, and broadcast equipment before they are permitted on the air.

WMCN provides Macalester and its surrounding community with music from various genres including rock, Americana, world, jazz, hip-hop, electronic, and classical, as well as talk radio programming. Community activist Dan Richmond called WMCN "one of the first places to look for new music and ideas".

The station began an overhaul of its facilities in 2006, adding enhanced webcast capabilities and working toward complete digitization of its music library. The digitization of nearly 20,000 songs was completed in 2007 and the station announced plans to sell off its vast CD library when the project was complete.

== Former on-air staff ==
While most student presenters at college radio stations do not pursue careers in broadcasting, some use the experience as a springboard to larger venues. Gregory Keltgen, now better known as "DJ Abilities", got his start as a hip hop DJ providing scratches as part of his older brother Derek's show on WMCN. Brian Bull, an award-winning business and economics reporter for WCPN 90.3 ideastream and contributing reporter for National Public Radio, got his first job in radio hosting a weekly classical music program on WMCN during his freshman year. Joanna Stein, a 2006 Macalester graduate and WMCN veteran, joined the staff of National Public Radio's Morning Edition program. Jennifer Downham, former host of Groove Garden on community radio station KFAI, has said she did not "pursue her musical interests until she became a radio DJ" on WMCN. Described as "the Queen Mother of the Twin Cities hip-shagging, funked-up improv music scene", Downham had not worked as an announcer before working at WMCN.

== See also ==
- Campus radio
- List of college radio stations in the United States
