= WRLC (FM) =

- Williamsport, Pennsylvania; United States
- Frequency: 91.7 MHz
- Branding: The Thunder

Programming
- Format: College

Ownership
- Owner: Lycoming College

History
- Call sign meaning: Williamsport; Radio; Lycoming; College

Technical information
- Licensing authority: FCC
- Facility ID: 39273
- Class: A
- ERP: 740 watts
- HAAT: −91 meters (−299 ft)
- Transmitter coordinates: 41°14′42″N 76°59′50″W

Links
- Public license information: Public file; LMS
- Webcast: Listen Live
- Website: WRLC Online

WRLC (91.7 FM, "The Thunder") is a non-commercial educational radio station licensed to serve Williamsport, Pennsylvania, United States. The station is owned by Lycoming College.

WRLC broadcasts a college radio format.
