= RenewFM =

Christian radio network in New England

- Type: Radio network
- Country: United States
- Branding: RenewFM

Ownership
- Owner: Horizon Christian Fellowship

History
- Launch date: 2006

Links
- Website: renewfm.org

RenewFM is a network of Christian radio stations in New England, broadcasting Christian music and Christian talk and teaching programs.

== History ==
RenewFM's first station, WRYP, began broadcasting in 2006. In 2009, Horizon Christian Fellowship sold two translators in South Dakota and Iowa to Saga Broadcasting for $35,000. In 2010, Horizon Christian Fellowship purchased WFGL and WJWT from Calvary Chapel Costa Mesa for $300,000. The same year, Horizon Christian Fellowship sold two translators in North Dakota to Leighton Enterprises for $50,000 and a translator in Texas to World Radio Link for $10,000.

In 2021, Horizon Christian Fellowship purchased AM 1000 WCMX from City United Church for $12,000, and became RenewFM's first Spanish-language station. In 2023, Horizon Christian Fellowship purchased a construction permit for a new FM station on 97.3 MHz in Orange, Massachusetts, for $173,000, and also purchased WSJQ in Pascoag, Rhode Island, which it had been operating as a RenewFM affiliate since 2020. Also in 2023, Horizon Christian Fellowship was awarded a construction permit for a new FM station in Narragansett Pier, Rhode Island, after the FCC found that its competing applicant, Radio Sharon Foundation, had engaged in misrepresentations in its application.

== Stations ==
Originally airing on WRYP, RenewFM is heard on 11 full-powered stations in Massachusetts, New Hampshire and Rhode Island, as well as 4 translators.

=== Full-powered stations ===
Call sign	Frequency	City of license	State	Facility ID	Class	Power (W)	ERP (W)	Height (m (ft))	Transmitter coordinates
WYDI	90.5 FM	Derry	New Hampshire	175362	A	—	600	82 m (269 ft)	42°53′10.3″N 71°20′24.2″W
WJNF	91.7 FM	Dalton	Massachusetts	175441	A	—	160	298 m (978 ft)	42°26′11.3″N 73°3′12.4″W
WJWT	91.7 FM	Gardner	Massachusetts	122204	A	—	850	84 m (276 ft)	42°33′29.3″N 72°3′4.3″W
WYZX	88.3 FM	East Falmouth	Massachusetts	175310	B1	—	8,000	77 m (253 ft)	41°40′57.4″N 70°21′15.1″W
WFGL	960 AM	Fitchburg	Massachusetts	8418	B	2,500 day 1,000 night	—	—	42°35′24.3″N 71°49′41.3″W
WCMX (Note: Spanish-language)	1000 AM	Leominster	Massachusetts	54850	D	1,000 day	—	—	42°31′25.3″N 71°44′5.3″W
WTYN	91.7 FM	Lunenburg	Massachusetts	122297	A	—	1,000	12 m (39 ft)	42°35′40.3″N 71°40′8.2″W
WKXE	97.3 FM	Orange	Massachusetts	762508	A	—	5,800	−6 m (−20 ft)	42°36′3.2″N 72°22′54.5″W
WWRN	88.5 FM	Rockport	Massachusetts	176844	A	—	2,700	59 m (194 ft)	42°35′30.3″N 70°42′2.1″W
WRYP (Note: Flagship station)	90.1 FM	Wellfleet	Massachusetts	122299	A	—	2,500	24.3 m (80 ft)	42°1′53.3″N 70°5′24″W
WXEV	91.1 FM	Bradford	Rhode Island	176949	A	—	180	29 m (95 ft)	41°29′41.7″N 71°47′4.7″W
WSJQ	91.5 FM	Pascoag	Rhode Island	176661	B1	—	10,300	5 m (16 ft)	41°58′29.4″N 71°37′43.2″W

=== Translators ===
Call sign	Frequency (MHz)	City of license	State	Facility ID	Rebroadcasts
W279BQ	103.7	Boston	Massachusetts	152268	WWRN
W291DA	106.1	Fitchburg	Massachusetts	138873	WFGL
W244CF	96.7	Plymouth	Massachusetts	138875	WRYP
W271CG	102.1	Quincy	Massachusetts	156579	WRYP
