= WUMB-FM =

Public radio station in Boston

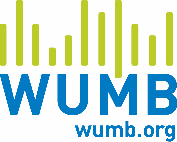
- Boston, Massachusetts; United States
- Broadcast area: Greater Boston
- Frequency: 91.9 MHz (HD Radio)
- Branding: WUMB Radio

Programming
- Format: Americana; roots; blues; folk
- Affiliations: American Public Media

Ownership
- Owner: University of Massachusetts Boston; (University of Massachusetts)

History
- First air date: September 19, 1982
- Call sign meaning: University of Massachusetts Boston

Technical information
- Licensing authority: FCC
- Facility ID: 66578
- Class: A
- ERP: 160 watts
- HAAT: 189 meters (620 ft)
- Transmitter coordinates: 42°14′49.4″N 71°2′54.2″W
- Translators: (105.3 MHz) W287DE (Orleans, rebroadcasts WFPB)
- Repeater: (see table below)

Links
- Public license information: Public file; LMS
- Webcast: Listen live
- Website: www.wumb.org

WUMB-FM (91.9 FM) in Boston, Massachusetts, is the radio station of the University of Massachusetts Boston. It broadcasts a mix of Americana, blues, roots, and folk hosted by its staff weekdays. On weekends the station concentrates on traditional folk, Celtic, blues, and world music including syndicated programs. Overnight programming starting at midnight and usually through 5 am is a repeat of a portion of the previous day's programming; an announcement of this fact is made at midnight. The station has received many awards for its folk music programming.

== Programming ==
WUMB-FM operates as a noncommercial public radio–style station which carries some NPR programming. HD Radio technology allows WUMB to transmit a high-quality digital signal. Due to the crowded state of the noncommercial end of the FM dial in New England, WUMB operates at a modest 160 watts, effectively limiting its coverage area to Boston itself and its innermost suburbs. To widen its signal, it operates a network of eight repeater stations across eastern Massachusetts and southern New Hampshire. WUMB-FM can also be heard on the Internet at both low bit rate for those with dial up connection and in stereo for those with broadband service.

Since 1998, WUMB has sponsored a live music festival, called the Boston Folk Festival through 2009, but renamed to WUMB Music Fest in 2010 and 2011. The first festival was held at scattered sites in Boston's Back Bay. Since then, it has taken place on the University of Massachusetts-Boston campus. The event is currently in hiatus, however WUMB does continue to participate in music festivals around New England like the Lowell Summer Music Series and the New Bedford Folk Festival.

Until 2013, WUMB broadcast with 660 watts, with a height above average terrain of 63 meters; after the station lost its then–transmitter site, the station moved to a new site and began broadcasting with its present 160-watt facility.

Original materials from WUMB have been contributed to the American Archive of Public Broadcasting.

== Repeater stations ==
In addition to the main station, WUMB is relayed by eight repeaters and one translator to widen its broadcast area.

Call sign	Frequency	City of license	First air date	Power (W)	ERP (W)	Height (m (ft))	Class	Facility ID	Coordinates	Call Sign Meaning	Former Call Signs
WFPB (Note: WFPB operated as a commercial station from 1970 until its donation to UMass Boston by GramCam Communications in 1998.)	1170 kHz	Orleans	April 10, 1970	670 (daytime only)	—	—	D	8591	41°46′50.4″N 70°0′36.07″W	derived from WFPB-FM (see below)	WVLC (1970–1980); WKZE (1980–1983); WVLC (1983–1985); WKPE (1985–1998)
WBPR	91.9 MHz	Worcester	1994	—	270	213 m (699 ft)	A	69163	42°18′11.3″N 71°53′50.3″W	"Boston Public Radio"	
WFPB-FM	91.9 MHz	Falmouth	1995	—	260 (horizontal); 5,200 (vertical)	76.1 m (250 ft)	A	69057	41°36′50.3″N 70°35′54.1″W	"Falmouth Public Broadcasting"	
WNEF	91.7 MHz	Newburyport	January 13, 2002	—	1 (horizontal); 1,000 (vertical)	100 m (328 ft)	A	93889	42°51′56.3″N 70°56′15.1″W	"We're New England's Folk"	
WUMG (Note: WUMG shares time with high school radio station WAVM in Maynard.)	91.7 MHz	Stow	August 10, 2010	—	500	23.5 m (77 ft)	A	122279	42°25′17.3″N 71°27′8.2″W	disambiguation of WUMB	
WUMT	91.7 MHz	Marshfield	November 2011	—	1,100	25 m (82 ft)	A	122278	42°4′38.3″N 70°42′19.1″W	disambiguation of WUMB	
WUMV	88.7 MHz	Milford, New Hampshire	July 11, 2012	—	670	12 m (39 ft)	A	174551	42°49′58.3″N 71°43′43.2″W	disambiguation of WUMB	
WUMZ	91.5 MHz	Gloucester	March 18, 2019	—	100 (horizontal)	14 m (46 ft)	A	174558	42°36′41.3″N 70°40′2.2″W	disambiguation of WUMB	

Broadcast translator for WFPB
Call sign	Frequency	City of license	FID	ERP (W)	Class	Transmitter coordinates	FCC info
W287DE	105.3 FM	Orleans, Massachusetts	200242	250	D	41°46′46.4″N 70°0′33.9″W	LMS

Notes:

In addition to its primary repeaters, starting in 2007 WPNI (1430 AM) in Amherst temporarily repeated WUMB by arrangement with WFCR while Pamal Broadcasting sought a buyer for the station; this ended when Pamal shut WPNI down on November 30, 2013. WHRB (95.3 FM) in Cambridge and WLYN (1360 AM) in Lynn have also offered temporary WUMB simulcasts in the past during transitions to either new studios or new ownership.
