= WMRL (FM) =

WMRA
- Lexington, Virginia; United States
- Broadcast area: Metro Lexington
- Frequency: 89.9 MHz
- Branding: WMRA

Programming
- Format: Public Radio
- Affiliations: American Public Media; BBC World Service; NPR; Public Radio International

Ownership
- Owner: James Madison University; (James Madison University Board of Visitors)
- Sister stations: WMRA, WMRY

History
- First air date: June 1992
- Call sign meaning: W (James) Madison Radio Lexington

Technical information
- Licensing authority: FCC
- Facility ID: 30177
- Class: A
- Power: 100 watts
- HAAT: −81 meters (−266 ft)
- Transmitter coordinates: 37°47′25.0″N 79°26′5.0″W

Links
- Public license information: Public file; LMS
- Webcast: Listen Live
- Website: WMRL Online

WMRL (89.9 MHz) is a Public Radio formatted broadcast radio station licensed to and serving Lexington, Virginia. WMRL is owned and operated by James Madison University. WMRL rebroadcasts sister station WMRA full-time.

Previous logo
