= Media in Rhode Island =

The state of Rhode Island has the following popular media.

== Newspapers ==
- The Boston Globe (Rhode Island) of Boston, owned by Boston Globe Media Partners, via their Providence-based bureau, covering all of Rhode Island
- The Brown Daily Herald of Providence, owned independently, covering Brown University
- The Call of Woonsocket, owned by RISN Operations, covering northern Providence County
- Kent County Daily Times of West Warwick, owned by RISN Operations, covering most of Kent County
- The Newport Daily News of Newport, owned by GateHouse Media, covering most of Newport County
- The Providence Journal of Providence, owned by GateHouse Media, covering all of Rhode Island
- The Times of Pawtucket, owned by RISN Operations, covering eastern Providence County
- The Westerly Sun of Westerly, owned by RISN Operations, covering western Washington County

== Magazines ==
- Providence Monthly
- Rhode Island Monthly

== Television ==
- 6/WLNE-TV-New Bedford, MA (.1 ABC/.2 Grit/.3 Escape) (WLNE is not a Rhode Island TV station but does serve as the ABC affiliate for the Providence, RI TV Market)
- 10/WJAR-Cranston (.1 NBC/.2 Me-TV/.3 Comet/.4 TBD)
- 12/WPRI-TV-Providence (.1 CBS/.2 MyNetworkTV/.3 Bounce/.4 Get TV)
- 28/WLWC-New Bedford, MA (.1 Court TV) (WLWC is not a Rhode Island TV station but does serve as the Court TV affiliate for the Providence, RI TV Market).
- 36/WSBE-TV-Providence (.1 PBS)
- 51/WRIW-CD-Providence (.1 Telemundo)
- 64/WNAC-TV-Providence (.1 FOX/.2 CW/.3 Laff)
- 69/WPXQ-TV-Block Island (.1 Ion)

== AM Radio ==
- 550/WSJW Pawtucket: Religion
- 630/WPRO Providence: (NewsTalk 630 WPRO): News/Talk
- 790/WPRV Providence: News/Talk, Yankee baseball
- 920/WHJJ Providence: (TalkRadio 920 WHJJ): News/Talk
- 1110/WPMZ East Providence: (Poder 1110): Spanish
- 1180/WSKP Hope Valley: Oldies
- 1220/WSTL Providence: Spanish
- 1230/WBLQ Westerly: Full Service
- 1240/WOON Woonsocket: Full service
- 1290/WPVD Providence: Ocean State Media
- 1380/WNRI Woonsocket: News/Talk
- 1450/WWRI West Warwick: Classic Rock
- 1540/WADK Newport: Full service
- 1590/WARV Warwick: Religion

== FM Radio ==
| Frequency | Call Letters | Community of License | Format | Owner | Web site |
|---|---|---|---|---|---|
| 88.1 | WELH | Providence | "Classic Cutting Edge" Alt-Rock | Wheeler School | |
| 88.3 | WQRI | Bristol | Rock | Roger Williams University | |
| 88.7 | WJMF | Smithfield | Classical Music (simulcast of WCRB) | Bryant University | |
| 89.3-FM; 89.3-HD1 | WNPN | Newport | Public Radio News/Talk | Ocean State Media | |
| 89.3-HD2 | WNPN | Newport | BBC World Service | Ocean State Media | |
| 90.3 | WRIU | Kingston | College | University of Rhode Island | |
| 90.7 | WNPH | Portsmouth | Public Radio News/Talk | Ocean State Media | |
| 91.3 | WDOM | Providence | College | Providence College | |
| 91.5 | WCVY | Coventry | Classic TV themes | Coventry High School | |
| 91.5 | WSJQ | Pascoag | Christian Contemporary | Epic Light Network | |
| 92.3 | WPRO-FM | Providence | Top 40 | Cumulus Media | |
| 92.7 | W224DG | Warwick | (rebroadcasts WARV) Religious | Blount Communications | |
| 93.3 | WSNE | Taunton, Massachusetts | Hot adult contemporary | iHeartMedia | |
| 93.3-HD2 | WSNE | Taunton, Massachusetts | News/talk (simulcast of WHJJ) | iHeartMedia | |
| 93.3-HD3 | WSNE | Taunton, Massachusetts | The Breeze | iHeartMedia | |
| 93.7 | W229AN | Providence | (rebroadcasts WSTL) Spanish Tropical | Radio Sharon | |
| 94.1 | WHJY | Providence | Rock | Clear Channel | |
| 94.9 | W235CN | Providence | (rebroadcasts WSTL) Spanish Tropical | Radio Sharon | |
| 95.1 | WWRI-LP | Coventry | Spanish Tropical | Marconi Broadcasting Foundation | |
| 95.5 | WLVO | Providence | Contemporary Christian | Educational Media Foundation | |
| 95.9 | WCRI-FM | Block Island | Classical | Judson Group, Inc. | |
| 96.5 | WIGV-LP | Providence | Spanish Religious | Casa De Oracion Getsemani | |
| 96.5 | W243AI | Newport | (rebroadcasts WMVY) Adult Album Alternative | David P. Maxson | |
| 96.7 | WSUB-LP | Ashaway | Alternative rock | The Buzz Alternative Radio Foundation, Inc. | |
| 97.3 | WJFD | New Bedford | Portuguese/World Music | WJFD-FM Inc. | |
| 98.1-FM; 98.1-HD1 | WCTK | New Bedford | Country Music | Hall Communications | |
| 98.1-HD2 | WCTK | New Bedford | Classic Hits (simulcast of WNBH) | Hall Communications | |
| 99.1 | WPLM | Plymouth, Massachusetts | Soft Adult Contemporary | Plymouth Rock Broadcasting Company | |
| 99.3 | WMNP | Block Island | CHR Pop | 3G Broadcasting, Inc. | |
| 99.5 | W258DR | New Bedford, Massachusetts | (rebroadcasts WNBH) Classic Hits | Hall Communications | |
| 99.5 | W258DU | Woonsocket | (rebroadcasts WOON) Full Service | O-N Radio, Inc | |
| 99.7 | WEAN-FM | Wakefield-Peacedale | News/Talk (Simulcast of WPRO AM 630) | Cumulus Media | |
| 99.9 | W260DC | Woonsocket | (rebroadcasts WNRI) Conservative News/Talk | Bouchard Broadcasting | |
| 100.3 | WKKB | Middletown | Spanish Tropical | Red Wolf Broadcasting Corporation | |
| 101.1 | WBRU-LP; WFOO-LP; WVVX-LP | Providence; 3-way simulcast | Urban contemporary Arts/Culture; Community Radio | Brown Student Radio; AS220; Providence Community Radio | |
| 101.1 | W266DI | Newport | (rebroadcasts WADK) Full Service news/talk | 3G Broadcasting | |
| 101.5-FM; 101.5-HD1 | WWBB | Providence | Oldies | iHeartMedia, Inc | |
| 101.9 | WCIB | Falmouth, Massachusetts | Classic Hits | iHeartMedia, Inc. | |
| 102.1 | W271CR | East Providence | (rebroadcasts WPMZ) Spanish | Video Mundo Broadcasting Co., LLC. | |
| 102.3 | WMOS | Stonington, Connecticut | Classic Rock | Cumulus Media | |
| 102.7 | WNPE | Narragansett Pier | Public Radio News/Talk | Ocean State Media | |
| 102.9 | W275DA | Providence | (rebroadcasts WPVD) Public Radio News/Talk | Ocean State Media | |
| 103.1 | W276DF | Westerly | (rebroadcasts WBLQ) Full service | Diponti Communications | |
| 103.7-FM; 103.7-HD1 | WVEI-FM | Westerly | Public Radio News/Talk | Ocean State Media | |
| 104.3 | W282CB | Hope Valley | (rebroadcasts WSKP Oldies) | Red Wolf Broadcasting Corp | |
| 104.7 | W284BA | Warwick | (rebroadcasts WSNE-HD2) News/Talk | iHeartMedia, Inc. | |
| 105.1-FM; 105.1-HD1 | WWLI | Providence | Adult Contemporary | Cumulus Media | |
| 105.5 | W288EE | West Warwick | (rebroadcasts WWRI) Classic Rock | Diponti Communications | |
| 105.9 | WXHQ-LP | Newport | Jazz | Newport Music Arts Association | |
| 106.3 | WWKX | Woonsocket | Classic rock | Cumulus Media | |
| 107.5 | W298DE | Warwick | (rebroadcasts WSJW) Catholic religious | Relevant Radio | |
| 107.7 | WWRX | North Stonington, Connecticut | Rhythmic Top 40 | Fuller Broadcastings International | |

== Other stations ==
Other radio stations from Connecticut and Massachusetts can be heard in parts of or all of Rhode Island. These include, but are not limited to:

- 980 WXLM
- 1320 WARA
- 1350 WINY
- 1400 WHTB
- 1480 WSAR
- 89.7 WGBH
- 94.5 WJMN
- 96.1 WSRS
- 100.7 WZLX
- 102.3 WXLM
- 102.5 WKLB-FM
- 105.7 WROR-FM
- 106.1 WCOD
- 106.7 WMJX
- 107.1 WFHN
- 107.3 WKVB
- 107.9 WXKS-FM
