= List of radio stations in Rhode Island =

The following is a list of the FCC-licensed radio stations in the U.S. state of Rhode Island, which can be sorted by their call signs, frequencies, cities of license, licensees, and programming formats.

== List of radio stations ==
List of radio stations in Rhode Island
Call sign	Frequency	City of License	Licensee	Format
WADK	1540 AM	Newport	3G Broadcasting, Inc.	News/Talk
WARV	1590 AM	Warwick	Blount Communications, Inc.	Religious
WAST-LP	95.1 FM	Coventry	Arsan Broadcasting Foundation	Spanish
WBLQ	1230 AM	Westerly	Christopher Diapola d/b/a Diponti Communications	Full service
WBRU-LP	101.1 FM	Providence	Brown Student Radio	Variety
WCRI-FM	95.9 FM	Block Island	Judson Group, Inc.	Classical
WCVY	91.5 FM	Coventry	Coventry Rhode Island Public Schools	Public radio/High School Radio
WDOM	91.3 FM	Providence	Providence College	College/Indie
WEAN-FM	99.7 FM	Wakefield-Peacedale	Radio License Holding CBC, LLC	News/Talk (WPRO)
WELH	88.1 FM	Providence	The Wheeler School	Public radio
WFOO-LP	101.1 FM	Providence	AS220	Variety
WHJJ	920 AM	Providence	iHM Licenses, LLC	News/Talk
WHJY	94.1 FM	Providence	iHM Licenses, LLC	Mainstream rock
WIGV-LP	96.5 FM	Providence	Casa De Oracion Getsemani	Spanish religious
WJMF	88.7 FM	Smithfield	Bryant University	Classical (WCRB)
WKIV	88.1 FM	Westerly	Educational Media Foundation	Contemporary Christian (K-Love)
WKKB	100.3 FM	Middletown	Red Wolf Broadcasting Corporation	Spanish Tropical
WLVO	95.5 FM	Providence	Educational Media Foundation	Contemporary Christian (K-Love)
WMNP	99.3 FM	Block Island	3G Broadcasting, Inc.	Top 40 (CHR)
WNPE	102.7 FM	Narragansett Pier	Ocean State Media Group	Public radio
WNPH	90.7 FM	Portsmouth	Ocean State Media Group	Public radio
WNPN	89.3 FM	Newport	Ocean State Media Group	Public radio
WNRI	1380 AM	Woonsocket	Bouchard Broadcasting, Inc.	News/Talk
WOON	1240 AM	Woonsocket	O-N Radio, Inc.	Full service
WPMZ	1110 AM	East Providence	Video Mundo Broadcasting Co., LLC	Spanish Tropical
WPRO	630 AM	Providence	Radio License Holding CBC, LLC	News/Talk
WPRO-FM	92.3 FM	Providence	Radio License Holding CBC, LLC	Top 40 (CHR)
WPRV	790 AM	Providence	Radio License Holding CBC, LLC	Sports (WW1/BetQL)
WPVD	1290 AM	Providence	Ocean State Media Group	Public radio
WPVD-FM	103.7 FM	Westerly	Ocean State Media Group	Public radio
WQRI	88.3 FM	Bristol	Roger Williams University	College radio
WRIU	90.3 FM	Kingston	University of Rhode Island	College radio
WSJQ	91.5 FM	Pascoag	Epic Light Network, Inc.	Christian Top 40
WSJW	550 AM	Pawtucket	Relevant Radio, Inc.	Catholic talk
WSKP	1180 AM	Hope Valley	Red Wolf Broadcasting Corporation	Oldies
WSTL	1220 AM	Providence	Diaz Holdings, LLC	Spanish Tropical
WVVX-LP	101.1 FM	Providence	Providence Community Radio	Community radio
WWBB	101.5 FM	Providence	iHM Licenses, LLC	Classic hits
WWKX	106.3 FM	Woonsocket	Radio License Holding CBC, LLC	Classic rock
WWLI	105.1 FM	Providence	Radio License Holding CBC, LLC	Adult contemporary
WWRI	1450 AM	West Warwick	DiPonti Communications, LLC	Classic rock
WWRX	107.7 FM	Bradford	Fuller Broadcasting International, LLC	Rhythmic contemporary
WXEV	91.1 FM	Bradford	Horizon Christian Fellowship	Religious
WXHQ-LP	105.9 FM	Newport	Newport Musical Arts Association	Jazz

== Defunct ==
- WALE
- WJAR-FM
- WKFD
- WPAW
- WPJB
- WRJI
- WSUB-LP
