= WLKW =

WLKW may refer to:

- WLKW (FM), a radio station (95.3 MHz) licensed to Celoron, New York, United States.
- WALE, a radio station (990 kHz) licensed to Greenville, Rhode Island, United States that held the WLKW callsign from 1961-1987.
- WSJW (AM), a radio station (550 kHz) licensed to Pawtucket, Rhode Island, United States that held the WLKW callsign from 1997-2000.
- WWRI, a radio station (1450 kHz) licensed to West Warwick, Rhode Island, United States, which held the callsign WLKW from 2002-2017.
- WWBB, a radio station (101.5 MHz) licensed to Providence, Rhode Island, United States, that held the WLKW-FM callsign until December 26, 1989.
