= WLVO (FM) =

- Providence, Rhode Island; United States
- Broadcast area: Rhode Island; Southeastern Massachusetts
- Frequency: 95.5 MHz

Programming
- Format: Contemporary Christian
- Network: K-Love

Ownership
- Owner: Educational Media Foundation
- Sister stations: WKIV; WTKL; WKVB

History
- First air date: June 5, 1955
- Former call signs: WPFM (1955–1965); WBRU (1965–2017)
- Call sign meaning: "Love"

Technical information
- Licensing authority: FCC
- Facility ID: 7313
- Class: B
- ERP: 18,500 watts
- HAAT: 139 meters (456 ft)
- Transmitter coordinates: 41°49′40.3″N 71°22′7.1″W

Links
- Public license information: Public file; LMS
- Webcast: Listen live
- Website: www.klove.com

WLVO (95.5 FM) is a radio station broadcasting a contemporary Christian music format as an affiliate of the K-Love network. Licensed to serve Providence, Rhode Island, United States, it serves Rhode Island and Southeastern Massachusetts. It first began broadcasting in 1955 under the call sign WPFM, and from 1966 until 2017 operated under the ownership of Brown Broadcasting Service (a non-profit organization run by Brown University students but independent of the university) as alternative rock radio station WBRU (now an Internet radio station). The station is currently owned by the Educational Media Foundation.

== History ==
=== WJAR-FM (1948–1953) ===
The first occupant of 95.5 FM in Providence was WJAR-FM, owned by The Outlet Company along with WJAR (920 AM, now WHJJ) and starting in 1949, longtime NBC affiliate WJAR-TV (then on channel 11, now on channel 10). WJAR-FM signed on in May 1948 as a full-time simulcast of the AM station; its transmitter location in Rehoboth, Massachusetts, was shared with WJAR-TV, which went on the air the following year. The Federal Communications Commission (FCC) cancelled the WJAR-FM license at Outlet's request on January 19, 1953.

=== WPFM (1955–1965) ===
A construction permit for a new station on 95.5 FM was issued to Plantations Broadcasting Corp. on May 25, 1955; it went on the air June 5, 1955, as WPFM. In 1958, the station was acquired by Golden Gate Corp. for $10,000; at the time, Golden Gate's president, Harold C. Arcato, also had interests in WRIB (1220 AM, now WSTL) and WNET (channel 16, now WNAC-TV channel 64). WPFM began broadcasting 24 hours a day on September 1, 1958; Arcato stated that it was the first FM radio station in New England to operate full-time. During the 1960s, the station had affiliations with the QXR Network and the CRB Network.

=== WBRU (1966–2017) ===
Golden Gate Corp. purchased WHIM (1110 AM, now WPMZ) and WHIM-FM (94.1 FM, now WHJY) in 1964, under the condition that it sell WPFM and its one-third stake in WLKW (990 AM, later known as WALE). In 1965, WPFM was sold to Brown Broadcasting Service for $30,000; the new owners changed the call letters to WBRU. The station, which had been off the air, resumed broadcasting February 21, 1966; the first program to be transmitted from the new station was a panel show which discussed the Peace Corps. In 1969, WBRU adopted a progressive rock format; in 1988, it shifted from album-oriented rock to alternative rock.

=== Sale to Educational Media Foundation; switch to K-Love ===
In March 2017, the station's board of directors passed a resolution to begin seeking a buyer for the station, after 50 years of being owned and operated by the independent non-profit Brown Broadcasting Service, Inc. organization. Several alumni of the station opposed the resolution.

On August 25, 2017, it was announced that Brown Broadcasting Service had sold the 95.5 FM license to Educational Media Foundation, a Christian music broadcaster, which planned to take over the frequency on September 1. WBRU itself was not included as part of the sale, and Brown Student Radio applied to the FCC to transfer the call letters to its low-power radio station. In a statement on its website, WBRU announced that it would continue operations as an online radio station, with separate feeds for both its traditional modern rock format and its 360 Degree Experience in Sound hip hop and R&B program.

WBRU aired for the last time on 95.5 FM at 11:59 p.m. on August 31 and was replaced on that frequency by Educational Media Foundation's K-Love Christian adult contemporary network. The callsign was changed to WLVO on September 1, 2017.

The day of WBRU's final broadcast on FM radio, former Brown Broadcasting Service station member Tucker Hamilton alleged that the sale of the station's license was coerced; Hamilton and other members of a WBRU alumni group have asked Rhode Island attorney general Peter Kilmartin to block the sale to Educational Media Foundation. According to the attorney general's office, they met "with alumni and their attorney as a courtesy, but as our attorneys explained, Rhode Island statute and regulation does not give the attorney general any legal authority to intervene, as is the case in nearly all private sales." The sale was approved by the FCC on October 24, 2017, and completed on November 1.
