= WHIM =

WHIM may refer to:

- The Warm–hot intergalactic medium in astrophysics
- WHIM syndrome, Wart, Hypogammaglobulinemia, Infection, and Myelokathexis syndrome

Callsigns

- WHIM-LP, a low-power radio station (99.5 FM) licensed to serve Hialeah Gardens, Florida, United States
- WHIM (Rhode Island), a series of radio stations in Rhode Island, United States
  - WPMZ, a radio station (1110 AM) licensed to serve East Providence, Rhode Island, which held the call sign WHIM from 1947 to 1992 and 1993 to 1995
  - WWRI, a radio station (1450 AM) licensed to serve West Warwick, Rhode Island, which held the call sign WHIM from 1995 to 1998
- WQOS (AM), a radio station (1080 AM) licensed to serve Coral Gables, Florida, which held the call sign WHIM from 2010 to 2018
- WNDO, a radio station (1520 AM) licensed to serve Apopka, Florida, which held the call sign WHIM from 1998 to 2010

== See also ==
- Whim (disambiguation)
