= WALE =

WALE may refer to:

- WALE-LD, a low-power television station (channel 16, virtual 17) licensed to serve Montgomery, Alabama, United States
- WBHU, a radio station (105.5MHz/Channel 288) licensed to St. Augustine Beach, Florida, United States which previously used the WALE callsign from September 30-December 22, 2014
- WALE (Rhode Island), a defunct AM radio station (990kHz) licensed to Providence and later Greenville, Rhode Island, United States that held the WALE callsign from 1989 until its deletion on April 1, 2014
- WHTB, an AM radio station (1400kHz) licensed to Fall River, Massachusetts that held the call sign WALE from 1948 until 1989
