= Jefferson Kaye =

American radio and television voiceover

- Born: Martin Jeff Krimski; December 12, 1936; Baltimore, Maryland, U.S.
- Died: November 16, 2012 (aged 75); Binghamton, New York, U.S.
- Other name: Jeff Kaye
- Occupations: Radio, television and film announcer / Program director
- Years active: 1950s–2012
- Known for: Narration work for numerous NFL Films programs
- Spouse: Suzanne (m. 1958)
- Children: 4

Martin Jeff Krimski, known by the stage names Jefferson Kaye and Jeff Kaye (December 12, 1936 – November 16, 2012) was an American radio, television and film announcer. Among his credits were announcing gigs at WHIM and WRIB in Providence, Rhode Island; WBZ in Boston, Massachusetts; WKBW and WBEN in Buffalo, New York; WPVI in Philadelphia; and NFL Films.

Kaye was born in Baltimore, Maryland. He served in the US Air Force during the Korean War and was stationed in Morocco where he met his wife Suzanne in 1958.

Kaye began his radio career in Providence in the late 1950s, where Krimski became "Jeff Krimm," then "JK the DJ" on WHIM (1110) and WRIB (1220-AM). By 1961, he had caught the attention of WBZ (AM-1030) station executives, who brought him on as part of the Westinghouse Broadcasting-owned station's transition from the middle-of-the-road "Live Five" to a more aggressive top-40 music programming format.

As program director of WKBW, he produced the station's adaptation of The War of the Worlds. For his work on NFL Films, Kaye won several Sports Emmy Awards. He also narrated the Chicago Bulls' first championship documentary, "Learning To Fly", as well as a history of DePauw University football, "A Tradition of Excellence."

Kaye died on November 16, 2012, of throat cancer at age 75 in Binghamton, New York.
