= WSNE-FM =

Radio station in Massachusetts, United States

- Taunton, Massachusetts; United States
- Broadcast area: Providence metropolitan area; Southeastern Massachusetts
- Frequency: 93.3 MHz (HD Radio)
- Branding: Now 93.3

Programming
- Format: Hot adult contemporary
- Subchannels: HD2: Simulcast of WHJJ (talk)
- Affiliations: Premiere Networks

Ownership
- Owner: iHeartMedia, Inc.; (iHM Licenses, LLC)
- Sister stations: WHJJ; WHJY; WWBB

History
- First air date: January 26, 1966
- Former call signs: WRLM (1966–1980); WRLM-FM (1980); WSNE (1980–2001)
- Call sign meaning: Southern New England

Technical information
- Licensing authority: FCC
- Facility ID: 74069
- Class: B
- ERP: 31,000 watts
- HAAT: 180 meters (590 ft)
- Transmitter coordinates: 41.866°N 71.289°W
- Translator: HD2: 104.7 W284BA (Warwick)

Links
- Public license information: Public file; LMS
- Webcast: Listen live (via iHeartRadio)
- Website: now933fm.iheart.com

WSNE-FM (93.3 MHz) is a commercial radio station, licensed to Taunton, Massachusetts, serving Southeastern Massachusetts and most of Rhode Island. It is owned by iHeartMedia, Inc. and broadcasts a hot adult contemporary radio format branded Now 93.3. Its studios and offices are on Oxford Street in Providence. The station carries the syndicated On Air with Ryan Seacrest in afternoons. Several of the other shifts are voicetracked by DJs working at other iHeart stations.

WSNE-FM has an effective radiated power (ERP) of 31,000 watts, with a transmitter located in Rehoboth, Massachusetts. The station can be heard throughout Greater Boston, Rhode Island, eastern Connecticut and parts of Cape Cod. WSNE-FM broadcasts using HD Radio technology. The HD2 digital subchannel simulcasts the talk radio format from co-owned WHJJ (920 AM) and feeds FM translator 104.7 W284BA in Warwick, Rhode Island. The HD3 subchannel formerly carried iHeart's soft adult contemporary service known as "The Breeze".

== History ==
=== WRLM ===
On January 26, 1966, the station signed on as WRLM, named for original owner Robert L. McCarthy. It played middle of the road music in monaural, as well as broadcasting local news and high-school sports for Taunton and the vicinity. During the 1970s, WRLM adopted an adult contemporary format and went with FM stereo in 1976.

In 1980, co-owners John McCarthy and Joseph Quill sold WRLM to the Outlet Company, the then owners of WJAR (now WHJJ) and WJAR-TV in Providence. While the AC format was maintained on "FM 93", the call sign was changed to WSNE.

=== WSNE debuts ===
Several high-profile Providence personalities joined the station's staff including Mike Sands, Paul Perry, Bob Hollands and Patty Costa. Studios were moved to Providence and the transmitter was moved to Rehoboth, Massachusetts, improving the station's signal in Rhode Island. By 1984, Ken Cole was added for evenings and the station was now known as "93.3 WSNE". By 1986, the last four hours of Ken Cole's show was called "Pillow Talk", featuring love songs and telephone dedications.

In 1986, Beck-Ross Communications, Inc purchased WSNE. Then-former WEAN (now WPRV) personality Joannie Edwardsen was brought in as the morning news anchor. Shortly after, former WPRO afternoon host David Jones was hired to take over mornings. With the addition of Chuck Hinman as news anchor by years end, Jones & Joan would become the new morning show. By 1989, Jones & Joan had gained a large following, finishing only second to WPRO's legendary Salty Brine.

=== Tragedy ===
On June 5, 1993, tragedy struck WSNE as longtime midday host Mike Sands was killed in an automobile accident while on his way to a station remote broadcast in Swansea, Massachusetts. The station paid tribute to Sands the following Monday with phone calls from listeners, former co-workers and personalities from other stations. Program Director Steve Peck and Jim Halfyard decided to split Sands' shift after his death, with Ken Cole on evenings and Amy Hawkins (later known as Amy Navarro) joining the station for overnights.

Since 1993, the station had slowly been evolving from adult contemporary to hot adult contemporary. When SFX Broadcasting acquired WSNE in 1995, the station re-imaged itself as "93-3 SNE", adding hotter jingles and the slogan "Southern New England's Variety Station". By late 1996, a less intense jingle package from JAM Creative Productions was added and the station re-imaged once again, reverting to the previously used "93-3 WSNE" with the slogan "A Better Variety of the '70s, '80s and '90s".

=== Clear Channel acquisition ===
After several mergers placing the station with Capstar and AMFM, Inc., WSNE came under Clear Channel Communications ownership in October 1999. Around this time, WSNE started leaning toward the AC format once again, with the syndicated Delilah call-in and dedications show being added at night. This effectively gave WSNE an AC format during the hours her show aired, with a lighter flavor of hot AC all other times. The station was assigned its current call sign WSNE-FM, adding the "FM" suffix to its callsign by the Federal Communications Commission on March 1, 2001.

In November 2002, a series of changes began at WSNE. The station played all Christmas music between Thanksgiving and Christmas day. On December 26, 2002, the long-running Jones & Joan morning show came to an end after nearly 17 years, as station management parted ways with Jones. The station re-imaged itself as the new "Star 93-3", leaning back toward hot AC. Within a month, Entercom Communications issued a cease and desist order on using the Star branding, as "Star 93.7" (now WEEI-FM) existed in the overlapping Boston radio market.

From mid-January until April 2003, the station was simply known as "The New 93-3" before being renamed as "Coast 93-3". In August 2003, Brian Mulhern (also known as "The Pharmacist") joined the morning show. However, Joannie, along with her husband Chuck Hinman, left the station in 2006. On November 16, 2006, Tad Lemire moved down the hall from country music station WCTK to become new morning show host, with Brian as co-host.

=== Ryan Seacrest, John Tesh and Matt Siegel ===
In June 2008, the syndicated On-Air With Ryan Seacrest was added for afternoons and Delilah was replaced with the John Tesh Radio Show for evenings. With this change, WSNE-FM began to sound overall like a hot AC station, since the AC music provided with Delilah was gone. On April 28, 2009, Clear Channel Communications eliminated 590 positions nationwide, which meant the dismissal of Program Director Chris Duggan and morning host Tad Lemire. On May 18, 2009, the station began airing the syndicated "Matty in the Morning", featuring Matt Siegel from sister station WXKS-FM in Boston.

In May 2009, WSNE-FM adopted the hot AC programming of a newly formed Clear Channel Communications service called Premium Choice. The service provides several music formats including the elements of scheduled music and the voicetracks of on-air talent from various Clear Channel stations across the country. Local Clear Channel stations may choose the programming elements they wish to use (if any). WSNE-FM elected to use Premium Choice's music playlist around the clock, while only using the voicetracked talent on weekends and Monday through Friday from midnight to 6 am. The same music and some of the talent heard on the station could also be heard on iHeartRadio's "Today's Mix", which is the national hot AC programming of Premium Choice.

=== Personnel changes ===
After Premium Choice programming was implemented, WSNE-FM's weekday lineup included "Matty in the Morning", Kristin Lessard, "On-Air with Ryan Seacrest" and the "John Tesh Radio Show". Lessard was the last remaining local DJ on the schedule. In August 2009, John Tesh was dropped and replaced with Cindy Spicer from Premium Choice. That shift is now hosted by Carter.

Logo as Coast 93.3 (2012–2021)

In June 2011, WSNE-FM dropped "Matty in the Morning" in favor of voicetracking from Toby Knapp, afternoon DJ at Clear Channel's WIHT in Washington, D.C. (Currently, "Doug & Jenn" host mornings locally.) The slogan was changed to "The Best Variety of the '90s, 2K and Today". Although not mentioned in the new slogan, popular songs from the 1980s were still played on occasion, as hot AC programming from Premium Choice still included 1980s music.

In 2015, the station switched to an adult top 40 format, dropping most of their older golds and adding more rhythmic material. By April 2017, the station reversed this change, adding back songs from the 1990s and 2000s to its playlist. By 2026, the station had fully transitioned back to iHeartMedia’s national hot AC playlist.

On August 16, 2021, WSNE-FM rebranded as "Now 93.3", aligning itself with other iHeart Radio stations across the United States.

== WSNE-FM HD2 ==
On April 25, 2006, Clear Channel announced that WSNE-FM would add an HD2 digital subchannel. When activated, it carried a format focusing on dance and disco hits. In 2009, the HD2 flipped to a smooth jazz format. Several years later, the smooth jazz format was replaced with a simulcast of co-owned talk radio station WHJJ. The HD2 subchannel feeds FM translator W284BA at 104.7 MHz, to give WHJJ listeners the choice to hear the station on FM.

Broadcast translator for WSNE-FM-HD2
Call sign	Frequency	City of license	FID	ERP (W)	HAAT	Class	Transmitter coordinates	FCC info
W284BA	104.7 FM	Warwick, Rhode Island	156672	99	45.3 m (149 ft)	D	41°45′22″N 71°26′40″W	LMS

== WSNE-FM HD3 ==
On January 28, 2014, WSNE-FM had begun rebroadcasting the K-Love Christian contemporary network on its new HD3 subchannel. In September 2014, WSNE-FM-HD3 began broadcasting a talk radio format. K-Love programming would eventually return to WSNE-FM HD3, before the sub-channel would eventually become a slightly-delayed simulcast of the main analog feed due to the Educational Media Foundation (which owns K-Love) buying WBRU in 2017. For a time, the HD3 subchannel was silent. It later returned with soft adult contemporary music from iHeartRadio's "The Breeze" service.
