= WBKV (disambiguation) =

WBKV is a radio station (102.5 FM) licensed to Buffalo, New York

WBKV may also refer to:

- WBWA, a radio station (88.9 FM) licensed to Buffalo, New York, which held the call sign WBKV from 2019 to 2023
- WLFM, a radio station (103.9 FM) licensed to Lawrenceburg, Tennessee, which held the call sign WBKV from 2018 to 2019
- WRYU, a radio station (1470 AM) licensed to West Bend, Wisconsin, which held the call sign WBKV from 1950 to 2016
