= WIMS (disambiguation) =

WIMS is a ratio station in Michigan City, Indiana.

WIMS may also refer to:

- Wireless Integrated MicroSystems, a collaboration of Michigan universities
- WWW Interactive Multipurpose Server, an online mathematics exercise application server
- Engineering Research Center for Wireless Integrated Microsystems (ERS WIMS)
- Javon Wims (born 1994), American football player

== See also ==
- WIM (disambiguation)
