= WIM =

WIM may refer to:

- Wim, a personal name
- World Islamic Mission, an international Islamic organization
- Woman International Master, a chess title
- Weigh in motion, a system for collecting vehicle weights while in motion
- Wimbledon station, UK (Station code)
- Windows Imaging Format, a file-based disk image format
- Woe, Is Me, a 7-member rock band from Atlanta

== See also ==
- WIMS (disambiguation)
- Whim (disambiguation)
