= WHIM (Rhode Island) =

- United States
- Broadcast area: Providence metro
- Branding: WHIM Country

Programming
- Format: Country (1966–97)
- Affiliations: ABC Radio; CBS Radio Network; CNN Radio

Ownership
- Sister stations: WHIM-FM

History
- First air date: April 15, 1947
- Last air date: December 20, 1997
- Former frequencies: 1110 kHz (1966–1991, 1992-1995); 550 kHz (1991–1992) (Note: The call sign for the 550 facility remained WICE.); 1450 kHz (1995–1997)

Technical information
- Class: 1110: D; 550: B; 1450: C
- Power: 1110: 1 kW originally, later 5 kW-daytime, 250 watts-night.; 550: 1kW daytime, 500 watts nighttime; 1450: 1kW fulltime

WHIM (known on-air as "WHIM Country") was a country music radio station in the Providence, Rhode Island, market.

== History ==
WHIM was first heard on April 15, 1947, when a new daytimer signed on for the first time on 1110 kHz. From 1958 to 1966, while under ownership of C. George Taylor and Bob Engles, WHIM was a top 40 station competing with WPRO and WICE. The station's owners also operated WHIM-FM 99.9 licensed to Cranston, Rhode Island, which later became WLOV and went dark.

A new WHIM-FM emerged on 94.1 MHz in 1966 when WHIM began broadcasting the format it would keep in one form or another for 31 years: country music. WHIM competed against fellow daytimers WRIB in Providence and WYNG in Warwick for Rhode Island's country music audience. Eventually WRIB and WYNG changed formats to religious programming (the former has since flipped to Spanish tropical music) and WHIM-AM-FM became "The Country Giant".

As time progressed, the FM changed its callsign to WHJY and format and become easy listening "Joy 94". In October 1981, WHJY changed its format again to album-oriented rock. In 1980, WHIM/WHJY's owners purchased WJAR in Providence from Outlet Communications and renamed it WHJJ. Due to U.S. Federal Communications Commission (FCC) regulations limiting the number of stations that could be owned by an entity in one market, WHIM was sold to East Providence Broadcasting. Some station personalities, such as Sherm Strickhouser and Ron St. Pierre, stayed with the previous ownership and worked for the new WHJJ, while others, like Jim O'Brien, continued on WHIM. Although WGNG briefly experimented with the format at one point in the early 1980s, from 1981 to 1988 WHIM did not face much competition (a daytimer in Hope Valley, Rhode Island, WJJF, came on in 1985, but its signal provided minimal coverage of Providence). In January 1986, based on authorization given to its attorneys from the FCC, WHIM began broadcasting at night with 250 watts of power.

On July 28, 1989, New Bedford, Massachusetts-based WMYS switched formats from adult contemporary. The newly renamed WCTK, transmitting with 50,000 watts of FM stereo, stole many country fans from WHIM. The first sign of real trouble came in 1991 when the then-owner Urso Broadcasting changed WHIM to WWRX "1110 CNN", rebroadcasting the audio of CNN Headline News. The WHIM intellectual property moved to AM 550 (by then WICE), while the callsign was warehoused on 105.3 FM in Kittery, Maine. A year later, the "1110 CNN" format was dropped and the WHIM call sign and country music format returned to 1110. The next blow came September 1, 1995, when the 1110 kHz frequency began broadcasting its present Spanish-language format "Poder 1110", eventually changing its call letters to WPMZ. The WHIM intellectual property and callsign moved to the former WKRI where it continued until December 19, 1997, when WHIM, unable to compete on a 1-kilowatt graveyard frequency, gave way to Radio Disney. Early in 1998, the callsign was changed to WHRC, and a religious station in Apopka, Florida, picked up the WHIM call sign to mean "W-HIM" (HIM meaning Jesus Christ). The record library was sold off, Radio Disney moved to AM 550 (as WDDZ), and WCTK's owner, Hall Communications, eventually purchased the 1450 frequency and renamed it first WWRI, then WLKW.

In its 50-year run, WHIM was the home to many talents, including Dan Williams, Charlie Huddle, Jeff Davis, Bill Friday, Jack Shannon and others. The crown jewel was The Hayloft Jamboree which had a show on NBC at one point. After WHIM, the show aired on WJJF. Eddie Zack died on January 9, 2002, and Cousin Richie died in 2005. WJJF became all-news WCNX, which was affiliated with CNN Headline News, in 2004 (that station now broadcasts an oldies format as WSKP), leaving Rhode Island with no country music station (WCTK, although serving the Providence market, remains licensed to New Bedford, Massachusetts; the format can also be received in the state through WCTY from Norwich, Connecticut, and WKLB-FM from Waltham, Massachusetts) until 2019, when WPVD, which was the last Providence-area radio station to use the callsign WHIM, began rebroadcasting WCTK.

WHIM's successor on 1110, WPMZ, initially operated using WHIM's night authorization of 250 watts. However, the authorization did not carry over to WPMZ, a point that would become clear in the next few years. Facing legal challenges from Carter Broadcasting, owner of fellow Spanish-language station WRIB, as well as Jefferson-Pilot Communications, owner of WBT in Charlotte, North Carolina (a clear-channel station on the 1110 frequency), WPMZ fought for night authorization but never received it. It did, however, receive an FCC fine for unauthorized nighttime operation. As of August 2013, copies of the letter authorizing WHIM's night power are in the hands of former WHIM president Bob Harrison and station general manager Richard Muserlian.

== Association with WRIW-LP ==
Three former WHIM DJs hosted talk shows on low-power TV station WRIW-LP (channel 23) in 1998: Danny Williams, Charlie Huddle, and Jeff Davis. At the time WRIW-LP was affiliated with the America One network (the station is now a Telemundo affiliate).
