= WAST-LP =

- Coventry, Rhode Island; United States
- Broadcast area: Kent County, Rhode Island
- Frequency: 95.1 MHz
- Branding: Play 95.1

Programming
- Language: Spanish

Ownership
- Owner: Arsan Broadcasting Foundation

History
- First air date: February 6, 2016
- Former call signs: WWRI-LP (2016–2024)

Technical information
- Licensing authority: FCC
- Facility ID: 193137
- Class: LP
- ERP: 100 watts
- HAAT: 18.45 meters (60.5 ft)
- Transmitter coordinates: 41°42′0.4″N 71°35′39.2″W

Links
- Public license information: LMS

WAST-LP, previously WWRI-LP, is an FM radio station broadcasting on 95.1 MHz, licensed to Coventry, Rhode Island, United States owned by Arsan Broadcasting Foundation.

== History ==
This station began broadcasting as WWRI-LP on February 9, 2016. WWRI-LP was managed by Chris DiPaola, owner of WBLQ (1230 AM) and manager of WSUB-LP ("96.7 the Buzz") in Westerly, Rhode Island. On October 1, 2020, at 5:30 p.m., its programming moved to WWRI (1450 AM and 105.5 FM), the former WPVD, after it was acquired by DiPonti Communications. At the same time, the Federal Communications Commission (FCC) resolved an investigation into WWRI-LP for airing unauthorized commercials on four occasions between 2016 and 2020, including issuing a $15,000 fine.

In 2022, the station's license was transferred to Arsan Broadcasting Foundation. The call sign was changed to WAST-LP on April 15, 2024.
