= Four Deep Sports Talk =

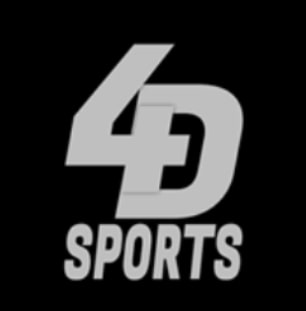
Four Deep Sports Talk logo

Four Deep Sports Talk, also known as Four Deep Sports Talk Show Inc., is a sports talk radio program in Attleboro, Massachusetts, that airs on WARA (AM) every Saturday from 12:00 p.m. to 1:00 p.m. It also airs on more than 40 public-access television stations in Massachusetts.

== History ==
It was founded by Dominic Damiano in 2007.

A United States Navy veteran and Massachusetts native, Damiano was inspired to create Four Deep Sports Talk after being deployed in the American South where high school sports typically receive more media attention than they do in the Northeast.

Four Deep Sports Talk has received attention for its annual awards honoring boys’ and girls’ basketball players and coaches of the year who compete in the Massachusetts Interscholastic Athletic Association for high schools in Southeastern Massachusetts, as well as presenting lifetime achievement awards.
