= Sports Journal =

Sports magazine

- Categories: Sports magazine
- Frequency: Monthly
- Founded: 2002
- Final issue: 2007
- Company: SpoJo Entertainment
- Country: United States
- Based in: Providence, Rhode Island
- Website: Sports Journal official website

The Sports Journal was a monthly sports magazine published by Sports Journal Entertainment in Providence, Rhode Island. The first issue was published in 2002, then in newspaper form. The magazine ceased publication in 2007.

== Radio program ==
The Sports Journal hosted a radio program on 1320AM in Providence, Rhode Island, from 2004 until 2006.
