= WLKW (FM) =

- Celoron, New York; United States
- Broadcast area: Jamestown, New York
- Frequency: 95.3 MHz
- Branding: K-Love

Programming
- Format: Christian adult contemporary
- Network: K-Love

Ownership
- Owner: Educational Media Foundation
- Sister stations: WBKV; WBWA

History
- First air date: October 27, 2011
- Former call signs: WLKW-FM (2011–2018)
- Call sign meaning: Lakewood; formerly shared with AM station WLKW

Technical information
- Licensing authority: FCC
- Facility ID: 189508
- Class: A
- ERP: 2,500 watts
- HAAT: 10.1 meters (33 ft)
- Transmitter coordinates: 42.096°N 79.243°W

Links
- Public license information: Public file; LMS
- Website: klove.com

WLKW (95.3 FM) is a radio station broadcasting a Christian adult contemporary music format. Licensed to Celoron, New York, United States, the station serves the Jamestown, New York area. The station is owned by Educational Media Foundation (EMF), and carries EMF's K-Love format.

== Programming ==
WLKW carries no local programming and, with rare exceptions, has never done so.

== History ==
=== As a commercial station ===
WLKW signed on in 2011, initially with an "-FM" suffix attached to its call sign, as an AM station in Rhode Island also held the call sign at the time. Until March 14, 2016, News Talk 95.3 The Lake aired Fox News Radio reports at the top of each hour and local news reports at the bottom of each hour. Its daytime programming came from the Premiere Networks talk network (Glenn Beck Program, The Rush Limbaugh Show, The Sean Hannity Show), with secondary programming sources including Talk Radio Network (The Savage Nation on weeknights and select weekend programming), Cox Radio/Dial Global (tape-delay airings of Neal Boortz and Clark Howard), and Cumulus Media Networks (overnight programs John Batchelor and Red Eye Radio). The station's owner at its launch was Cross Country Communications, a company majority owned by the Rowbotham family of Rhode Island.

On March 14, 2016, WLKW began airing programming from CBS Sports Radio. Beck and Hannity (but not Limbaugh, despite all three sharing the same distributor) were carried over from the previous lineup and continued to air on the station.

=== Sale to Educational Media Foundation ===
In August 2018, Cross Country announced plans to exit the Jamestown radio market. Under the terms of the sale, Media One Group, the owners of all other commercial radio stations in Jamestown, would purchase sister station WKZA. To comply with ownership caps, WLKW-FM would instead be spun off to Educational Media Foundation, which would introduce its K-Love contemporary Christian music format to the region, entering a crowded Christian music field against locally originated competitors such as Family Life Network and Dove FM. The sale to EMF closed on October 31, 2018, at which time the -FM suffix was dropped.
