= WARA (AM) =

- Attleboro, Massachusetts; United States
- Broadcast area: Providence, Rhode Island
- Frequency: 1320 kHz
- Branding: WARA 1320 AM

Programming
- Format: Community radio

Ownership
- Owner: Attleboro Access Cable Systems, Inc.

History
- First air date: October 8, 1950; 76 years ago
- Former call signs: WIRD (CP, 1950); WARA (1950–1998); WJYT (1998–2000); WARL (2000–2014); WRNP (2014–2015)
- Call sign meaning: Attleboro Radio Association (original owners)

Technical information
- Licensing authority: FCC
- Facility ID: 65197
- Class: B
- Power: 5,000 watts (unlimited)
- Transmitter coordinates: 41°57′33.36″N 71°19′35.19″W

Links
- Public license information: Public file; LMS
- Webcast: Listen live
- Website: wararadio.com

WARA (1320 AM) is a radio station in Attleboro, Massachusetts. Its transmitter is located in North Attleborough, Massachusetts. The station is owned by Attleboro Access Cable Systems.

It is home to Four Deep Sports Talk, a weekly sports radio show.

== History ==
=== 1950s ===
WARA first signed on October 8, 1950. It was the local Attleboro radio station from then until 1998. Its original power was 1 kW. WARA had the callsign WIRD assigned to it until it changed to WARA on March 29, 1950.

=== 1980s ===
==== Early-Mid 1980s ====
Day(s)	Times (Eastern)	Show Title	Show Host	Notes
Monday-Friday	Midnight-06:00		Frank Belsky	
Monday-Friday	06:00-09:00		Larry Tocci	
Monday-Friday	09:00-Noon		Dave Kane	
Monday-Friday	Noon-15:00		Chuck Whalen	
Monday-Friday	15:00-18:00		Scott Duncan, then Jeff Starr	Jeff replaced Scott in 1988.
Monday-Thursday	18:00-20:00		Ron Struminski	Show simulcast on Inland Cable television channel 8
Friday	18:00-20:00		Jeff Lowe	
Monday-Friday	20:00-Midnight		Tom Rafferty	
Saturday	10:00-14:00		Frank O'Donnell	
Saturday	14:00-18:00		Rena Gordon	
Saturday	20:00-Midnight		Jack Burns	Oldies program
Sunday	14:00-18:00		Scott Duncan	Started at the station hosting a show Friday Midnight- 6 am Saturday and Saturday Midnight to Sunday 6 AM before being promoted to weekday afternoons.
Sunday	18:00-20:00		Chris Baker	Request/dedication music show for older listeners
Sunday	20:00-Midnight		Ron Santa	

==== 1985-1987: power increase ====
WARA's owners applied for a power increase to its currently-authorized 5 kW day & night on September 24, 1985 (BP-19850924AF). The FCC granted the increase on April 1, 1986, with a license to cover being issued on September 25, 1987. Additionally, WARA changed ownership from Jerome Ottmar to James H., Peter H. and David J. Ottmar in 1986.

=== 1990s ===
By 1995, WARA was talk radio as "Talk 1320" by this time. It was owned by Peter Ottmar's Back Bay Broadcasting, along with WPNW, WWKX and WBNW.

On July 31, 1995, WARA, now owned by Dr. Michele E. Merolla of Fairhaven, Massachusetts, began syndicating Coast to Coast AM hosted by Art Bell. Art held the East of the Rockies line open in the final half-hour of the show to take calls from WARA listeners.

In 1998, WARA became Spanish-language WJYT. ADD Radio Group bought the station effective June 1.

=== 2000s ===
WJYT changed calls to WARL on December 6, 2000. As WARL, it has had many formats, which are detailed below. The first of these formats was "Web Access Radio Live"- a brokered time/internet TV hybrid. By this time, the station shifted its focus to the nearby Providence, Rhode Island, area, even though it cannot be received well in parts of Providence.

In 2002, WARL became easy listening with Norm Jagolinzer as host. Later that year the format changed from easy listening to urban as "Power 1320".

In 2003, WARL changed formats again to all-conspiracy talk "Reality Radio 1320" (featuring programming from Genesis Communications Network). The programming had been airing on WALE until its bankruptcy sale in May 2003.

In 2004, the format was changed to sports talk "1320 The Drive", which was programmed by Scott MacPherson as a companion to his Sports Journal newspaper. WARL was the Providence-area affiliate of Sporting News Radio from 2004 to 2006. It was the flagship station for the Providence Bruins Radio Network for the 2005–06 season.

In September 2006 WARL changed again to new-age "Positive Energy Moving Forward". It dropped sports programming during this time.

According to a filing with the FCC in early 2007, the station's transmitter facility was substantially damaged by vandals. The owner asserted that they were unable to return the station to its licensed daytime power, even with four radio engineers and support from the transmitter equipment manufacturer. In April 2008, the FCC dismissed their request to extend the temporary authority to remain at reduced power.

In 2009, WARL added Boston College Eagles sports as well as Attleboro High School football.

=== 2010s ===
In May 2010, Jeff Santos, who bought time on WWZN in Boston to air progressive talk, announced on his show that they were buying time on WARL as well, in full force by May 31, 2010. Santos' show went off WARL in 2012.

On May 6, 2013, WARL leased out much of its morning schedule (from 6 a.m. to noon) Mondays through Saturdays to Southeastern Massachusetts Broadcasting, which used the time for talk shows and a radio classifieds program; these programs, branded SoMa 1320, were directed toward Bristol County, as opposed to the entire Providence market. The programming began as a six-month trial period.

On April 13, 2014, WARL changed its call sign to WRNP. On March 20, 2015, the ADD Radio Group agreed to donate the WRNP license to Attleboro Access Cable Systems, which converted the station to noncommercial operation. The new owners changed the station's callsign back to WARA; the WRNP callsign was not included in the donation. The donation was completed on May 5, 2015, with the return of the WARA call sign following the next day.

== See also ==
- List of community radio stations in the United States
