= Whim =

Whim may refer to:

- Whim, U.S. Virgin Islands, a settlement
- Whim (mining), a capstan or drum with a vertical axle used in mining
- Whim (carriage), a type of carriage
- Whim, a reissue of Adventures of Wim, a book by George Cockroft as Luke Rhinehart
- Whim, a character in Jim Woodring's Frank
- Sillywhim, a fictional female character in Wee Sing in Sillyville

== See also ==
- WHIM (disambiguation)
