= WBWA =

- Buffalo, New York; United States
- Broadcast area: Buffalo
- Frequency: 89.9 MHz

Programming
- Format: Contemporary worship music
- Affiliations: Air1

Ownership
- Owner: Educational Media Foundation
- Sister stations: WBKV; WLKW

History
- First air date: 1989
- Former call signs: WBFR (1984–1985); WFBF (1985–2019); WBKV (2019–2023)

Technical information
- Licensing authority: FCC
- Facility ID: 20725
- Class: B1
- ERP: 3,000 watts
- HAAT: 174 meters (571 ft)
- Transmitter coordinates: 42°38′10.4″N 78°42′59.6″W

Links
- Public license information: Public file; LMS
- Website: Air1.com

WBWA (89.9 FM) is a radio station in Buffalo, New York, broadcasting contemporary worship music from the Air 1 network without local deviation outside of station identification. It is owned by the Educational Media Foundation. Unlike most Buffalo stations, its signal is mostly audible only in the Southtowns, and has no over-the-air availability across Lake Ontario into the Greater Toronto Area; a weak signal and adjacent-channel interference from public radio stations WNJA and WPSX make the station inaudible in most of the western Southern Tier.

== History ==
The station signed on in 1989 as WFBF under the ownership of Family Stations, carrying its Family Radio network. In September 2019, Family Stations came to terms with the Educational Media Foundation to sell four stations, including WFBF, to that organization. Upon the sale's closing on November 22, 2019, the station became the Buffalo market's K-Love affiliate, and the station changed its call sign to WBKV.

In June 2023, EMF filed to move the callsign WBKV to WTSS (102.5 FM), which it was in the process of acquiring from Audacy, Inc.; the 89.9 facility was repurposed as Air1 station WBWA on June 16.
