= WHJY =

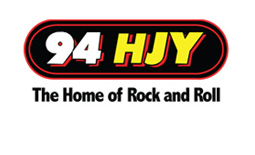
- Providence, Rhode Island; United States
- Broadcast area: Providence metropolitan area
- Frequency: 94.1 MHz
- Branding: 94HJY

Programming
- Format: Mainstream rock
- Affiliations: iHeartRadio; United Stations Radio Networks

Ownership
- Owner: iHeartMedia, Inc.; (iHM Licenses, LLC)
- Sister stations: WHJJ; WSNE-FM; WWBB

History
- First air date: March 14, 1966
- Former call signs: WHIM-FM (1966–1977)
- Call sign meaning: "Joy" (former easy listening format)

Technical information
- Licensing authority: FCC
- Facility ID: 72298
- Class: B
- ERP: 50,000 watts
- HAAT: 139 meters (456 ft)
- Transmitter coordinates: 41°49′40.4″N 71°22′7.2″W

Links
- Public license information: Public file; LMS
- Webcast: Listen live (via iHeartRadio)
- Website: 94hjy.iheart.com

WHJY (94.1 FM) is a commercial mainstream rock station in Providence, Rhode Island, owned by iHeartMedia. WHJY has been a rock station since September 4, 1981.

Its broadcast center, also used by its sister stations, is on Oxford Street, just west of Interstate 95 in Providence, and its transmitter is located on Eastern Avenue in East Providence. (The station's studios are located on the northeast corner of the building, facing I-95, and are sometimes referred to by DJs as "the Ghetto Penthouse.")

== History ==
WHJY signed on March 14, 1966, as WHIM-FM, a simulcast of country music station WHIM (1110 AM). The WHIM simulcast lasted through the 1970s until the FM station broke with the AM and became WHJY, "Joy 94", a beautiful music/easy listening station. On September 4, 1981, the station flipped to album rock, branded as "94 HJY". David Place, the actual radio DJ on the air when the format switched, began with Bob Seger's "The Fire Down Below".

=== WHJY and The Station Night Club Fire ===
WHJY was not the sponsor of the Great White concert at the Station Night Club in West Warwick, Rhode Island, on February 20, 2003, but they promoted the event with DJ Michael "The Doctor" Gonsalves as emcee. A pyrotechnics display triggered a massive fire, killing Gonsalves and 99 other people and destroying the club. In Gonsalves' memory, the radio station has set up "The Doc Fund", a scholarship with Rhode Island College (his alma mater) to support the victims and families of those affected who attend the school.

=== Paul & Al ===
From July 15, 1990 until August 27, 2026, the WHJY morning hosts were Paul Fuller and Al Milukas, known as "Paul and Al." They hold the record of the second longest morning show run in Providence behind Salty Brine’s 50-year run in mornings on WPRO. Following their retirement, WHJY afternoon hosts Doug Palmieri and Jenn Dower moved to the morning slot.

== Technical ==
WHJY transmits a 50,000-watt signal from a 550-foot (170 m) tower (456 feet (139 m) height above average terrain) at the end of Eastern Avenue in East Providence, Rhode Island. WHJY and WLVO are combined into an Electronics Research Inc. (ERI) SHPX-4BC, 4-bay FM antenna at the top of the tower. The tower is also used as part of the WPMZ (formerly WHIM) AM array, which has a skirt on the tall FM tower, and a shorter, second tower, at the same location.

== WHJY-HD2 ==
Previously, WHJY-HD2 had aired iHeartMedia's "The Alternative Project" (from between 2006 through the early 2010s).
