= WIGV-LP =

Providence, Rhode Island; United States
- Broadcast area: Providence metropolitan area
- Frequency: 96.5 MHz
- Branding: Radio Renacer

Programming
- Format: Spanish Religious

Ownership
- Owner: Casa De Oracion Getsemani

History
- First air date: 2009

Technical information
- Licensing authority: FCC
- Facility ID: 124214
- Class: L1
- ERP: 100 watts
- HAAT: 10 meters (33 ft)
- Transmitter coordinates: 41°47′27.00″N 71°25′20.00″W

Links
- Public license information: LMS

WIGV-LP (96.5 FM) is a low-power FM radio station broadcasting a Spanish religious format. Licensed to Providence, Rhode Island, United States, the station is currently owned by Casa De Oracion Getsemani.

== History ==
The Federal Communications Commission issued a construction permit for the station on March 14, 2008. The station was assigned the WIGV-LP call sign on February 3, 2009, and received its license to cover on May 20, 2009.
