= WWBB =

- Providence, Rhode Island; United States
- Broadcast area: Providence metropolitan area
- Frequency: 101.5 MHz (HD Radio)
- Branding: B101

Programming
- Format: Classic hits
- Subchannels: HD2: TikTok Radio
- Affiliations: Boston Red Sox Radio Network

Ownership
- Owner: iHeartMedia, Inc.; (iHM Licenses, LLC)
- Sister stations: WHJJ; WHJY; WSNE-FM

History
- First air date: May 30, 1955
- Former call signs: WTMH (1955–1958); WXCN (1958–1964); WCRQ (1964–1968); WLKW-FM (1968–1989)

Technical information
- Licensing authority: FCC
- Facility ID: 54568
- Class: A
- ERP: 6,000 watts
- HAAT: 91 meters (299 ft)
- Transmitter coordinates: 41°49′30.8″N 71°24′36.2″W

Links
- Public license information: Public file; LMS
- Webcast: Listen live (via iHeartRadio)
- Website: b101.iheart.com

WWBB (101.5 FM, "B101") is a radio station in Providence, Rhode Island, United States. The station plays classic hits from the 1970s, 1980s and 1990s. WWBB's offices and studios are located on Oxford Street in Providence, on the 3rd and 4th floors of the Roland Building near Interstate 95. WWBB's transmitting antenna is located on the roof of One Financial Plaza, also in Providence. WWBB transmits a directional signal to reduce interference to Boston-based sister station 101.7 WBWL. The station is owned by iHeartMedia, Inc.

== History ==
WWBB's history dates back to May 30, 1955, when it began broadcasting in Providence as WTMH. These call letters reflected the initials of its owner, T. Mitchell Hastings. In 1958, Hastings reorganized his General Broadcasting Corporation as Concert Network, Inc., and changed the callsign to WXCN. As a Concert Network affiliate, it broadcast classical music, as part of a chain that included WBCN in Boston, WNCN in New York City, and WHCN in Hartford, Connecticut.

The station was sold in 1963, and after another change in ownership the following year, it became WCRQ. By the late 1960s, the station changed owners again, becoming WLKW-FM, a sister station of AM 990 WLKW. For two decades as WLKW-FM, it aired a beautiful music format, often the top FM station in Providence. In 1987, the station was sold. Two years later, the easy listening format was dropped and WLKW-FM became WWBB. The station switched to oldies as B101.5 at Noon on December 26, 1989, playing a mix of hits from the 1950s and 1960s. The next day, B101.5 rebranded as B-101. The first song on B-101 was "Rock Around the Clock" by Bill Haley and the Comets. In 1995, B-101 was bought out by Clear Channel Communications.

As with most oldies stations over the years (and the transition to the new format name of classic hits), the station has followed the general industry direction of the oldest decade from the 1950s on being phased out and replaced with the alternate newer decade every few years, and a reduction of the playlist to iHeartMedia's (Note: Clear Channel became iHeartMedia on September 16, 2014.) consolidated national playlist, to the point some 2000s music now is played as of 2026.

In April 2026, it was reported that WWBB would become the area's Boston Red Sox Radio Network affiliate on May 1, concurrent with previous affiliate WVEI-FM being sold to Ocean State Media.

== Signal reduction and coverage change ==
On August 6, 2014, Clear Channel (now iHeartMedia) filed a "contingent application" with the U.S. Federal Communications Commission covering adjacent stations 101.7 WBWL in Lynn, Massachusetts, and 101.9 WCIB in Falmouth, Massachusetts, to improve WBWL's coverage in the Boston area. Boston is a much larger radio market than Providence, so boosting WBWL's signal would improve its advertising and revenue potential, despite the reduced coverage for WWBB and WCIB. The application called for downgrading WWBB's signal from a "Class B" (50,000-watt equivalent) to a "Class A" (6,000-watt equivalent) and using a directional signal away from Boston. The application also called for the relocation of WWBB antenna to the roof of a building in downtown Providence, a further step in reducing its coverage outside Providence and its suburbs. The application was granted October 6, 2014. WWBB completed the facility change in January 2015, and changed to the new facility on February 2, 2015.

== HD Radio ==
Upon the signal reduction, HD Radio service continued but the iHeart-provided comedy programming service (known as "Joke Joke") on WWBB-HD2 was discontinued. By 2018, WWBB-HD2 resumed operations, this time as a highly-automated easy listening/instrumental-formatted subchannel with an hourly ID called Spa Radio.
