= Engineering Research Center for Wireless Integrated Microsystems =

American research organization

The NSF Engineering Research Center for Wireless Integrated Microsystems (ERC WIMS) was formed in 2000 in Michigan — through the collaboration of the University of Michigan (UM), Michigan State University (MSU), and Michigan Technological University.

The center is funded by the National Science Foundation. Additional contributions came from the state of Michigan, the three partnering core universities, other federal agencies, and a consortium of about twenty companies.

== Purpose ==
The center researches innovations for wireless integrated microsystemss. The ERC WIMS works on merging micropower circuits, wireless interfaces, biomedical, and environmental sensors and subsystems, and advanced packaging to create microsystems that will have a pervasive impact on society during the next two decades.

The partnership combined UM's programs in sensors and microsystems with MSU's leadership in materials, especially in diamond and in carbon nanotubes, and Michigan Tech's expertise in packaging, micromilling, and hot embossing.

== See also ==
- Science and technology in Michigan
