= WXHQ-LP =

- Newport, Rhode Island; United States
- Broadcast area: Newport and Providence, Rhode Island
- Frequency: 105.9 MHz
- Branding: Radio Newport

Programming
- Format: Jazz; freeform

Ownership
- Owner: Newport Music Arts Association

History
- First air date: December 2001
- Call sign meaning: "X marks the spot for high quality programming"

Technical information
- Licensing authority: FCC
- Facility ID: 123581
- Class: L1
- ERP: 50 watts
- HAAT: 42.3 meters (139 ft)
- Transmitter coordinates: 41°29′6.3″N 71°18′30.1″W

Links
- Public license information: LMS
- Website: 1059xhq.org

WXHQ-LP (105.9 FM, "Radio Newport") is a non-commercial radio station licensed to the community of Newport, Rhode Island. The station serves Newport and the greater Providence, Rhode Island, area. The station is owned and operated by the Newport Music Arts Association, a non-profit organization. It airs a jazz and freeform format that, according to the station's website, includes "jazz, blues, r&b, bossa nova, Afro-Cuban, lounge, soul, funk, reggae, ska, electronic, downtempo, acid-jazz, surf, world, country, folk, and even occasionally some rock". The music played is almost exclusively instrumental and the station has a policy against playing songs featuring English language vocals.

The station has been assigned the WXHQ-LP call letters by the Federal Communications Commission since May 31, 2001. This is the first FCC-licensed low-power FM station in the state of Rhode Island. WXHQ-LP is also the first public radio station licensed to Newport.

== Community involvement ==
The WXHQ-LP studios are located on in a small office on Marlborough Street. The station's transmitter is located atop the Hotel Viking on Bellvue Avenue in downtown Newport. This transmitter site includes a rooftop container garden used to promote sustainable agriculture and green living by collecting rainwater and growing food.

Other community involvement activities of WXHQ-LP include providing music programming for the annual Newport Island Moving Co. dance festival, broadcasting the Newport Jazz Festival, and serving as a contributing sponsor each year for the Newport International Film Festival.

== FCC actions ==
On October 29, 2007, the FCC issued a $250 Notice of Apparent Liability for Forfeiture for WXHQ-LP to licensee Newport Music Arts Association. The fine was levied because the station failed to file a timely license renewal application and did not provide an explanation for the late filing. The standard fine of $3,000 was reduced because the licensee did file a renewal application before the actual expiration of the broadcast license.
