= WVVX-LP =

- Providence, Rhode Island; United States
- Frequency: 101.1 MHz

Programming
- Format: Community radio

Ownership
- Owner: Providence Community Radio

History
- First air date: 2000

Technical information
- Licensing authority: FCC
- Facility ID: 196448
- Class: LP100
- ERP: 100 watts
- HAAT: 11 metres (36 ft)
- Transmitter coordinates: 41°47′43.3″N 71°26′8.2″W

Links
- Public license information: LMS
- Website: www.procomrad.org

WVVX-LP (101.1 FM) is a radio station licensed to serve the community of Providence, Rhode Island. The station is owned by Providence Community Radio. It airs a community radio format, and operates on the 101.1 FM frequency in a timeshare arrangement with WBRU-LP and WFOO-LP. WVVX-LP's hours on the frequency are on Wednesdays from 6 to 10PM and Thursdays from 12 noon to 6PM local time.

The station was assigned the WVVX-LP call letters by the Federal Communications Commission on January 2, 2018.
