= The Outlet Company =

American retail and broadcasting company

- Type: Public
- Industry: Retail; Broadcasting
- Founded: 1891; 135 years ago
- Founder: Joseph Samuels; Leon Samuels
- Defunct: 1996; 30 years ago
- Fate: Television stations acquired by NBC
- Headquarters: Providence, Rhode Island, United States

The Outlet Company was a corporation based in Providence, Rhode Island, which owned holdings in both retail and broadcasting. The centerpieces of the group was its flagship Providence store (The Outlet) and WJAR radio and television, also in Providence.

== Retail ==
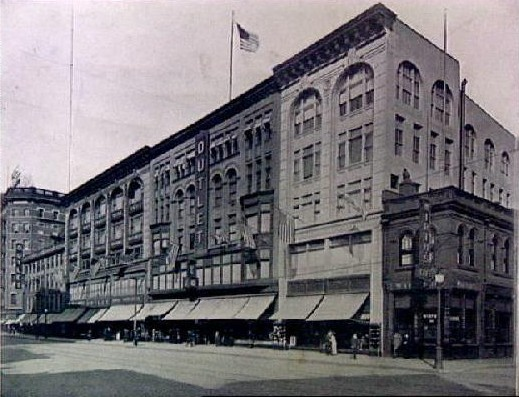
The Outlet Company, Providence, Rhode Island, c. 1910

The Outlet Company was formed in 1891 when brothers Joseph and Leon Samuels opened a department store at 176 Weybosset Street in downtown Providence. Known as The Outlet, it quickly became a Providence landmark to the point of occupying an entire city block and attracting shoppers from all over southern New England. For decades, the store remained strong with its sole flagship location and dominated the field of retail in not only Providence, but Rhode Island as a whole.

With the changing field of retail in the mid-20th Century, the company diversified with opening suburban locations as well as buying some existing stores such as Philadelphia-based Phillipsborn and Bedya, the midwestern Hughes & Hatcher chain, and The Edw. Malley Co. department store chain in New Haven, Connecticut. However, the allure of building a broadcasting empire under the leadership of company president Bruce Sundlun led Outlet to leave the retail business in November 1980. In 1981, the Outlet Company sold the original downtown retail store (and other stores) to United Department Stores and the flagship Outlet location on Weybosset Street was shuttered in 1982. The building was destroyed by fire on October 16, 1986.

== Broadcasting ==
As with many northeastern department stores in the 1920s, Outlet entered radio as a means of promoting their products to a wide audience. In 1922, Outlet entered broadcasting with the sign on of WJAR, which in 1926 became the first affiliated station of the NBC Red Network. In 1949, Outlet entered television broadcasting with the launch of WJAR-TV on channel 11; the station moved to channel 10 in 1953.

Along with retail, Outlet saw a mass expansion into broadcasting in the 1960s and beyond. After the sale of the retail divisions, the company went into a failed merger attempt with Columbia Pictures before it was sold in 1984 to members of the Rockefeller family. Two years later, the company was sold again to a combination of Outlet executives and venture capitalists who renamed the company to Outlet Communications and began a complete withdrawal from radio followed by a slimming down the number of their TV stations to three. In early 1996, Outlet and its three stations (plus control of two others) were sold to NBC; the name lived on as a license name of their former stations for a while afterward.

After ten years, all three stations were put up for sale by NBC on January 9, 2006, with Media General buying the stations on April 6, 2006 (the sale was finalized on June 26, 2006). This virtually undid the NBC-Outlet merger of a decade earlier.

== Former stations ==
- Stations are arranged in alphabetical order by state and city of license.
- Two boldface asterisks appearing following a station's call letters (**) indicate a station built and signed on by The Outlet Company.

Stations owned by The Outlet Company
Media market	State	Station	Purchased	Sold	Notes
Los Angeles	California	KIQQ	1977	1986	
Sacramento	California	KOVR	1978	1986	
Washington, D.C.	District of Columbia	WMMJ	1983	1986	
Washington, D.C.	District of Columbia	WTOP	1978	1993	
Orlando	Florida	WDBO	1963	1982	
Orlando	Florida	WDBO-FM	1963	1982	
Orlando	Florida	WDBO-TV	1963	1986	(Note: Known as WCPX-TV from 1982 onward.)
Atlanta	Georgia	WATL	1985	1989	
Indianapolis	Indiana	WXIN	1984	1989	(Note: Known as WPDS-TV prior to 1985.)
Detroit	Michigan	WQRS-FM	1979	1986	
Syracuse	New York	WNYS-TV	1971	1978	
Raleigh–Durham	North Carolina	WNCN	1994	1996	(Note: Known as WYED prior to 1994.)
Columbus	Ohio	WCMH-TV	1976	1996	
Philadelphia	Pennsylvania	WIOQ	1979	1989	
Providence	Rhode Island	WJAR **	1922	1980	
Providence	Rhode Island	WJAR-FM **	1948	1953	(Note: Ceased operations in 1953.)
Providence	Rhode Island	WJAR-TV **	1949	1996	
Providence	Rhode Island	WSNE	1980	1986	
San Antonio	Texas	KSAT-TV	1968	1986	

In 1994, Outlet signed local marketing agreements with the startup company Fant Broadcasting, which owned stations in two Outlet markets. Both of these stations were WB affiliates under Outlet control.

- WLWC (channel 28), New Bedford, Massachusetts, operated by WJAR-TV
- WWHO (channel 53), Chillicothe, Ohio, operated by WCMH-TV

Following its purchase of the remaining three Outlet stations, NBC kept involvement with the Fant stations until it orchestrated a three-way deal in which Fant sold the two stations to the original Viacom's Paramount Stations Group and, in return, NBC acquired Viacom/Paramount's WVIT in New Britain, Connecticut in 1997. Viacom/Paramount promptly added secondary affiliations with its UPN network; however, it was forced to run WLWC and WWHO as primary WB affiliates until 2000, when UPN became the primary affiliation, relegating WB to a secondary affiliation. The two stations were separated in March 2005 when Viacom sold WWHO to LIN TV. WLWC and WWHO both became affiliates of The CW, the result of a merger of UPN and WB, in the Fall of 2006. As of 2013, WWHO is operated by the Sinclair Broadcast Group (which now also owns WJAR) through a shared services agreement with its current owner Manhan Media while WLWC (which was owned outright by Sinclair for just over a year) is now owned by OTA Broadcasting (a subsidiary of Michael Dell's Dell Capital).
