= WHTB =

- Fall River, Massachusetts; United States
- Broadcast area: New Bedford, Massachusetts
- Frequency: 1400 kHz
- Branding: Rádio Voz Do Emigrante

Programming
- Format: Brokered Portuguese
- Affiliations: Spill-over affiliate of the Red Sox Radio Network, Boston Celtics Radio Network

Ownership
- Owner: Frank Baptista; (RVDE, LLC)

History
- First air date: May 6, 1948
- Former call signs: WALE (1948–1989)
- Call sign meaning: "Home Town Broadcasting"

Technical information
- Licensing authority: FCC
- Facility ID: 60701
- Class: C
- Power: 1,000 watts unlimited
- Transmitter coordinates: 41°41′23.8″N 71°8′39.4″W
- Translator: 93.7 W229DC (Fall River)

Links
- Public license information: Public file; LMS
- Webcast: Listen live
- Website: rvde.org

WHTB (1400 AM) is a Portuguese language radio station in Fall River, Massachusetts, operating with 1 kW unlimited hours.

== History ==
WALE began broadcasting May 6, 1948, on 1400 kHz with 250 watts of power (full-time). It was owned by Narragansett Broadcasting Company. The station's first location was at the corner of North Main Street and Central Street in Fall River, Massachusetts, known as the Durfee Theatre Building. The station's "Whale" was a plaster and chicken wire figure atop the building with the words "WALE 1400" on the sides in white paint. The transmitting antenna was on the roof and had a copper screen ground system. There was no real ground connection to the antenna, and the screen created an artificial grounding system, limiting the coverage area. The North Main Street/Central Street site was also the location of WCFR-FM and WCFR-TV, although it is not known if WCFR-TV ever produced a signal as after World War II the Channel 1 assignment (44-50Mc.) was dropped from television and given to the Business Radio Service. WALE moved to Rock Street in the early 1970s and the transmitter was relocated to the area along Interstate 195 West and Route 24 South at the end of Augustus St. and remains there today.

The WALE call sign moved to 990 AM in Providence, Rhode Island, on July 20, 1989. On that date, SNE Broadcasting Ltd. (owned by local businessmen Robert and James Karam) took ownership of 1400 AM and introduced the WHTB call sign. The studios moved to Home Street in Somerset, Massachusetts, when WHTB and WSAR became sister stations.

In 2018, WHTB signed on FM translator W229DC on 93.7 from the AM tower.

Effective December 30, 2022, SNE Broadcasting sold WHTB and translator W229DC to Frank Baptista's RVDE, LLC for $200,000.

== FM translator ==
Broadcast translator for WHTB
Call sign	Frequency	City of license	FID	ERP (W)	HAAT	Class	Transmitter coordinates	FCC info	Notes
W229DC	93.7 FM	Fall River, Massachusetts	200240	250	0 m (0 ft)	D	41°42′43.4″N 71°7′37.2″W	LMS	First licensed October 5, 2018.
