= WSUB-LP (Rhode Island) =

- Ashaway, Rhode Island; United States
- Broadcast area: Westerly–South Kingstown, Rhode Island; Southeastern Connecticut
- Frequency: 96.7 MHz
- Branding: 96-7 The Buzz

Programming
- Format: Alternative rock

Ownership
- Owner: The Buzz Alternative Radio Foundation, Inc.
- Sister stations: WBLQ; WWRI

History
- First air date: February 7, 2004
- Last air date: December 15, 2022
- Former call signs: WCTD-LP (2003–2005); WBLQ-LP (2005–2009); WYCM-LP (2009–2010); WRBZ-LP (2010–2011)

Technical information
- Facility ID: 124671
- Class: L1
- ERP: 100 watts
- HAAT: 30 meters (98 ft)
- Transmitter coordinates: 41°24′25.3″N 71°45′3.2″W

Links
- Website: deadby28.net/buzz/

WSUB-LP (96.7 FM, "The Buzz") was a radio station licensed to the community of Ashaway, Rhode Island. It served the greater Westerly, Rhode Island, region as well as South Kingstown, Rhode Island, and Southeastern Connecticut. The station was owned by The Buzz Alternative Radio Foundation, Inc., and aired an alternative rock format.

== History ==
On February 7, 2004, this low-power FM station first signed on as WCTD-LP on 96.9 MHz. The station aired an "all-disco all-the-time" music format. Branded as "96.9 The Party", the station's slogan was "You're always invited to our party." At sign-on, the station could be heard in parts of southwestern Rhode Island and southeastern Connecticut. When it signed on, this station was the only 24-hour disco station in the Northeastern United States.

In December 2005, WCTD-LP changed call letters to WBLQ-LP after sister station WBLQ switched to WKIV as part of its three-year LMA arrangement with the "K-Love" station group.

In March 2006, the station was granted a change in frequency from 96.9 to 96.7 MHz to reduce interference caused by the then-recent move of WHBE (now WEHN) in East Hampton, New York, from 96.7 MHz to 96.9 MHz.

In May 2007, Rhode Island Public Broadcasting reached an agreement to sell WXNI to Chris DiPaola's Diponti Communications for a reported $350,000. The AM station would also switch to the WBLQ call sign. In December 2007, Diponti Communications filed for transfer of the WXNI license. Owner Chris DiPaola told NorthEast Radio Watch that once the transfer was complete that the programming aired on WBLQ-LP would to the more powerful AM signal. The LPFM flipped to a contemporary Christian format with the call letters WYCM-LP, "Your Christian Mix" with the assistance of the folks at WYCM in Charlton, Massachusetts. After Steven Binley and WYCM decided to focus on his Worcester, Massachusetts, radio station, 96.7 changed call letters and format once again. The station changed its call sign to WRBZ-LP with an alternative rock format and the moniker, "96.7 The Buzz". Chris DiPaola was also an officer and director of Southern Rhode Island Public Radio Broadcasting, which owned WKIV, purchased from that corporation by Educational Media Foundation in March 2008, also in Westerly.

WBLQ-LP changed its call sign to WYCM-LP on November 26, 2009. WYCM-LP changed its call sign to WRBZ-LP on November 24, 2010. WRBZ-LP changed its call sign to WSUB-LP on February 9, 2011. WXNI switched to WBLQ on November 29, 2009, soon after the sale of WXNI closed.

WSUB-LP left the air on December 15, 2022, citing "loss of transmitter site and vandalization of equipment". It never returned to the air, and its broadcast license was automatically canceled after one year of non-operation.
