= WQRI =

- Bristol, Rhode Island; United States
- Broadcast area: East Bay, Rhode Island; Fall River, Massachusetts
- Frequency: 88.3 MHz
- Branding: Roger Radio

Programming
- Format: College radio/Variety

Ownership
- Owner: Roger Williams University

History
- First air date: April 1989

Technical information
- Facility ID: 57426
- Class: A
- ERP: 800 watts
- HAAT: 24 meters
- Transmitter coordinates: 41°38′57.00″N 71°15′34.00″W

Links
- Webcast: Listen live
- Website: wqri883fm.com

WQRI (88.3 FM) is the official radio station for Roger Williams University in Bristol, Rhode Island, United States. WQRI's D.J.s are students and staff at the university. They provide numerous live events, radio shows, and listening opportunities to the University and surrounding community. The station is currently owned by Roger Williams University and plays a variety of music genres which include alternative, metal, country, disco, classic rock, and many more. WQRI updated its systems in 2005 to include an internet stream.
