= WPMZ =

Radio station in East Providence, Rhode Island, United States

- East Providence, Rhode Island; United States
- Broadcast area: Providence metropolitan area
- Frequency: 1110 kHz
- Branding: Spanish: Poder 1110 (AM); Spanish: Poder 102.1 (FM)

Programming
- Format: Spanish tropical

Ownership
- Owner: Video Mundo Broadcasting Co., LLC

History
- First air date: April 15, 1947
- Former call signs: WKID (CP, 1947); WHIM (1947–1992); WWRX (1992–1993); WHIM (1993–1995)

Technical information
- Licensing authority: FCC
- Facility ID: 4377
- Class: D
- Power: 5,000 watts (daytime only)
- Transmitter coordinates: 41°49′40.36″N 71°22′7.2″W
- Translator: See § Translator

Links
- Public license information: Public file; LMS
- Webcast: Listen live
- Website: www.poder1110.com

WPMZ (1110 AM, "Poder 1110") is a radio station licensed to serve East Providence, Rhode Island, United States. The station is owned by Video Mundo Broadcasting Co., LLC. It airs a Spanish tropical format. WPMZ is relayed on an FM translator: W271CR on 102.1 MHz. The station has been assigned the callsign WPMZ by the Federal Communications Commission since November 1, 1995.

== History ==
WPMZ was known as WHIM from its inception in 1947 until the 1990s. It was the first radio station to employ Jefferson Kaye as an announcer; Kaye (then known as Jeff Krimm) would move on to stations in Boston, Buffalo and Philadelphia.

=== As WHIM ===
A construction permit for a new daytime-only radio station was filed by Inter-City Broadcasting on July 29, 1946, and granted on October 17, 1946. The station's first callsign was WKID, but was changed to WHIM on March 6, 1947, before the station signed on-air. WHIM signed on the air on April 15, 1947, with 1,000 watts of power (daytime only). A license to cover was filed for on June 24, 1947. Intercity Broadcasters would own the station until 1957, when it was sold to Buckley-Jaeger Broadcasting. Buckley-Jaeger owned the station until 1964, when it was sold to Golden Gate Corporation. Golden Gate would also sign on an FM sister station: WHIM-FM (now WHJY). Golden Gate sold WHIM-AM-FM to Culligan Communications Corporation in 1969. WHIM-AM-FM's ownership would change again 2 years later in 1971 to Franks Broadcasting. In 1979, Franks Broadcasting applied to increase the power on WHIM to 5,000 watts daytime and change the community of license to East Providence, Rhode Island. Franks sold WHIM-AM-FM to East Providence Broadcasting in 1980. East Providence Broadcasting sold WHIM to Bear Broadcasting (owner of then-WERI (AM) on March 8, 1989.

=== As WWRX (AM), back to WHIM, and to WPMZ ===
The next callsign change would occur on February 22, 1992, when it changed to WWRX. The format would change to a relay of CNN as "1110 CNN". During this time, current WPRI-TV/WNAC-TV anchor Mike Montecalvo would be an anchor on the station. The WHIM callsign would return on June 1, 1993, until changing to WPMZ on November 1, 1995. On the same date, the intellectual property of WHIM would switch to the former WKRI. Bear Broadcasting sold WPMZ to current owner Video Mundo Broadcasting in 1998.

=== Former personalities ===
- Jefferson Kaye (as Jeff Krimm)
- Mike Montecalvo (1992, during the "1110 CNN" era)

== Translator ==
Broadcast translator for WPMZ
Call sign	Frequency	City of license	FID	ERP (W)	HAAT	Class	Transmitter coordinates	FCC info
W271CR	102.1 FM	Providence, Rhode Island	71534	99	0 m (0 ft)	D	41°49′40.4″N 71°22′7.2″W	LMS
