= WNRI =

- Woonsocket, Rhode Island; United States
- Broadcast area: Northern Rhode Island, Southern Massachusetts
- Frequency: 1380 kHz
- Branding: 1380 AM & 99.9 FM WNRI

Programming
- Format: News/talk
- Affiliations: Genesis Communications Network; Radio America; Salem Radio Network; USA Radio Network

Ownership
- Owner: Bouchard Broadcasting, Inc.

History
- First air date: November 28, 1954
- Call sign meaning: Northern Rhode Island

Technical information
- Licensing authority: FCC
- Facility ID: 1734
- Class: D
- Power: 2,500 watts (day); 18 watts (night)
- Transmitter coordinates: 42°0′58.35″N 71°29′28.22″W
- Translator: See § Translator

Links
- Public license information: Public file; LMS
- Webcast: Listen live
- Website: www.wnri.com

WNRI (1380 AM, "1380 AM & 99.9 FM WNRI") is a radio station located in Woonsocket, Rhode Island. The station has a news/talk radio format and has been owned by Bouchard Broadcasting Inc. since 2004.

== Translator ==
Broadcast translator for WNRI
Call sign	Frequency	City of license	FID	ERP (W)	HAAT	Class	Transmitter coordinates	FCC info
W260DC	99.9 FM	Woonsocket, Rhode Island	26352	250	170 m (558 ft)	D	41°59′50.3″N 71°27′18.2″W	LMS
