= WJAR =

Television station in Providence, Rhode Island

- Providence, Rhode Island; New Bedford, Massachusetts; United States
- City: Providence, Rhode Island
- Channels: Digital: 25 (UHF); Virtual: 10
- Branding: 10.1: NBC 10; 10.2: Coastal ABC

Programming
- Affiliations: 10.1: NBC; 10.2: ABC; for others, see § Subchannels

Ownership
- Owner: Sinclair Broadcast Group; (WJAR Licensee, LLC)
- Sister stations: WLNE-TV

History
- Founded: 1949
- First air date: July 10, 1949
- Former call signs: WJAR-TV (1949–1986)
- Former channel numbers: Analog: 11 (VHF, 1949–1953), 10 (VHF, 1953–2009); Digital: 51 (UHF, 2000–2015), 50 (UHF, 2015–2019)
- Former affiliations: All secondary: CBS (1949–1955); DuMont (1949–1956); ABC (1949–1953, 1955–1963); The WB (1995–1997)
- Call sign meaning: taken from WJAR radio

Technical information
- Licensing authority: FCC
- Facility ID: 50780
- ERP: 1,000 kW
- HAAT: 302 m (991 ft)
- Transmitter coordinates: 41°51′55.4″N 71°17′12.7″W

Links
- Public license information: Public file; LMS
- Website: 10.1: turnto10.com; 10.2: coastalabc.com

WJAR (channel 10) is a television station in Providence, Rhode Island, United States, affiliated with NBC and ABC. It is owned by Sinclair Broadcast Group and operated alongside WLNE-TV (channel 6). The two stations share studios on Kenney Drive in Cranston, Rhode Island, and transmitter facilities in Rehoboth, Massachusetts.

== History ==
WJAR-TV signed on for the first time on July 10, 1949, broadcasting on channel 11. It was Rhode Island's first television station and the fourth in New England. It was owned by The Outlet Company, a department store chain headquartered in Providence, along with WJAR radio (920 AM, later WHJJ; and 95.5 FM, since occupied by WLVO). In 1952, after hearing about repeated instances of interference in Connecticut between WJAR-TV and New York City's WPIX (also on channel 11), the Federal Communications Commission (FCC)'s Sixth Report and Order changed the television allocations for Providence and forced the station to move to channel 10, which it did in the spring of 1953. At that time, WJAR's coverage area increased, since the interference with WPIX had been rectified.

WJAR-TV initially carried programming from all four existing networks (NBC, ABC, DuMont, and CBS), but has always been a primary NBC affiliate due to WJAR radio's long affiliation with NBC Radio. Despite this, WJAR only carried a little more than half of NBC's program schedule during its early years on the air; WJAR also broadcast about half of the CBS network schedule and a couple of shows each from ABC and DuMont every week. It lost ABC in 1953 when WNET (channel 16, WNAC-TV on channel 64) signed on, and lost CBS in 1955 when WPRO-TV (WPRI-TV) launched. When WNET went dark in 1955, WJAR shared ABC programming with WPRO-TV until WTEV (WLNE-TV) signed on in 1963. During the late 1950s, WJAR-TV was also briefly affiliated with the NTA Film Network. In 1954, WJAR-TV received national attention for its coverage of Hurricane Carol; newsreel films shot by WJAR cameramen of the storm and its aftermath not only appeared on the station, but also fed to CBS and NBC for use on their evening news programs.

For many years in the 1970s, WJAR-TV broadcast men's basketball games of Providence College and the University of Rhode Island, with Chris Clark calling play-by-play. In the early 1970s, when PC was one of the top teams in the country (and the top college basketball team in New England), their home games at the newly opened Providence Civic Center were often sellouts, despite the fact that WJAR televised many of these home games live.

In November 1980, the Outlet Company left the department store business to concentrate on broadcasting. A year earlier, the station moved its studios from the Outlet Building to a three-story modern production facility next door. The department store remained standing until 1986, when it burned to the ground in a spectacular fire. WJAR cameras perched on the neighboring rooftop captured the most dramatic footage. In April 1993, the station's studios were moved to their new location in an industrial area of Cranston just south of Providence. Three years later, Outlet Communications merged with NBC, making WJAR the second network-owned station in the market (CBS owned WPRI-TV for parts of 1995 and 1996 before it was forced to sell the station to Clear Channel Communications after CBS and Westinghouse merged due to a significant signal overlap with WBZ-TV).

In April 1997, WJAR began to operate WB affiliate WLWC (which was owned by Fant Broadcasting) under a local marketing agreement (LMA). Even by the time that station signed on, the future of the LMA was in doubt because NBC, which inherited the arrangement from Outlet, did not want to run stations outside its core owned-and-operated (O&O) outlets. The network, during this time, pushed Fant to sell WLWC. In September 1997, NBC came up with a three-way swap in which Fant exchanged WLWC and sister station WWHO in Columbus, Ohio, to Paramount/Viacom for that group's NBC affiliate in Hartford, Connecticut, WVIT.

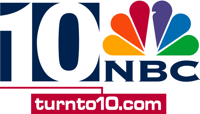
WJAR's logo from 2002 to 2014, imported from former sister station WCAU

WJAR was one of four NBC O&Os in smaller markets that were put up for sale on January 9, 2006, along with stations in Columbus, Birmingham, Alabama, and Raleigh, North Carolina. Except for the Birmingham station, these were also once owned by Outlet. On April 6, 2006, NBC Universal and Media General announced that Media General would purchase WJAR as part of a $600 million, four-station deal between the two companies. The deal was approved by the FCC on June 26. As a result, WJAR became Media General's first television station in New England. For all intents and purposes, this undid the NBC-Outlet merger a decade earlier.

In its earliest days, WJAR's logo included a Rhode Island Red rooster, the state bird of Rhode Island. Prior to WJAR's purchase by NBC, it had included different versions of a stylized "10" above the WJAR call letters. This had been in effect for the previous 20 years. The stylized "10" was initially retained after the purchase, but with the NBC peacock attached to the right-hand side and the call letters removed. This was dropped in 2002 in favor of an "NBC 10" logo first used on former sister station WCAU in Philadelphia. A modified version, used on newscasts starting in 2007, was designed and arranged similarly to other Media General station logos. In February 2014, both versions of that logo were replaced with the station's existing logo.

On March 21, 2014, LIN Media entered into an agreement to merge with Media General in a $1.6 billion deal. Because LIN already owned CBS affiliate WPRI and operated Fox affiliate WNAC-TV, and the two stations rank among the four highest-rated stations in the Providence market in total day viewership, the companies were required to sell either WJAR or WPRI-TV; on August 20, 2014, Media General announced that it would keep WPRI and the LMA with WNAC and sell WJAR, along with WLUK-TV and WCWF in Green Bay and WTGS in Savannah, Georgia, to the Sinclair Broadcast Group in exchange for KXRM-TV and KXTU-LD in Colorado Springs, WHTM in Harrisburg (which Sinclair, on behalf of Allbritton is planning on to divest) and WTTA in Tampa Bay. WHTM's sale of Media General was explored nearly two months earlier, and it was completed, nearly three months before the Media General/LIN deal was completed. The sale was completed on December 19, marking Sinclair's return to owning a Providence market station after a year and a half, as it owned WLWC from January 2012 until April 2013.

On September 12, 2025, Sinclair announced that it had acquired the non-license assets of WLNE "ABC 6" from Standard Media and would take over its operations.

On December 1, 2025, the ABC affiliation was moved from WLNE-TV to WJAR's second subchannel; Roar, which was formerly on WJAR-DT4, moved to WLNE's main channel. On January 12, 2026, WJAR-DT2 was rebranded from "ABC 6" to "Coastal ABC".

== News operation ==
WJAR NBC 10 broadcasts 37 1/2 hours of locally produced newscasts each week on channel 10.1 (with six hours each weekday, 3 1/2 hours on Saturdays and four hours on Sundays).

For most of its history, WJAR has been the far-and-away ratings leader in the Providence–New Bedford market. WPRI is consistently in second place, while WLNE was usually a distant third when it broadcast local news until 2025. This can be attributed to WJAR being the state's oldest station, as well as its association with its well-established radio sisters. In all four Nielsen ratings periods in 2016, the station was number one in all time slots.

In mid-1988, WJAR broke a tradition in its market; it began broadcasting news on weekdays at 5:30 p.m. with The 5:30 Report (renamed in 1992 as Up-front at 5:30), which included the top stories of the day, plus a cooking segment, weather, and entertainment news. It was expanded to one hour in January 1995 and was restructured as a conventional newscast.

On two occasions, WJAR has produced a prime time newscast at 10. The first began in April 1997 (entitled TV 28 News at 10) and was seen weeknights on WLWC in competition with the WPRI-produced show on Fox affiliate WNAC-TV. The broadcast was dropped that September when the LMA with WLWC ended. The second attempt has been airing on weeknights since October 1, 2007, when the station began producing NBC 10 News 10 at 10 on its NBC Weather Plus digital subchannel. It was originally a live, 10-minute production consisting of top stories of the day along with an updated weather forecast.

When WJAR-DT2 switched to RTV, the show expanded to a half-hour and was renamed NBC 10 News 10 at 10 on RTV. A new segment was added called "Flashback", which features vintage footage of past personnel. WLNE occasionally aired news at that time when it operated Cox channel 5 as NewsChannel 5, primarily when sports preempted WNAC's newscast. On September 6, 2010, WJAR began airing the area's second newscast weeknights at 7 p.m., joining WLNE, though it also airs on Saturday nights, unlike the other channels' weeknight production. WLNE's newscast was officially canceled in April 2011.

WJAR is notable for having employed three Today Show personalities. Former Today hosts Matt Lauer and Meredith Vieira worked at WJAR. Vieira started out as a reporter on the station in the late-1970s, while Lauer was co-host of WJAR's version of PM Magazine in the early-1980s. In 2012, former WJAR meteorologist Dylan Dreyer began doing weekend weather on Today. Other notable alumni include CNN Chief International Correspondent Christiane Amanpour and ESPN anchor Steve Berthiaume. In 2008, WJAR was awarded the National Edward R. Murrow Award for Overall Excellence for a small-market television station. In 2010, the station's website won a second national Murrow. In 2011, the station won its third national Murrow in a row, this time in the "Breaking News" category for its coverage of recent historic flooding. In 2012, the station's website won a regional Edward R. Murrow Award.

On May 16, 2011, WJAR became the first station in the Providence market to air newscasts in high definition (HD). A new set was constructed for the transition to HD and debuted on NBC 10 News Sunrise that morning. Photographs of the set as it was being built were posted on the station's Facebook page. During construction, newscasts were broadcast from a temporary set in the station's Studio B. Several technological upgrades also were made. In addition to its main studios, WJAR operates two news bureaus. The Bay State Newsroom is located at the old Standard-Times building on Pleasant Street in New Bedford. The Downcity Bureau is on Dorrance Street in downtown Providence. The station uses a live weather radar feed from the National Weather Service's local forecast office on Myles Standish Boulevard in Taunton, Massachusetts.

On September 6, 2022, WJAR introduced an hour-long 4 p.m. newscast, known as NBC 10 News at 4:00, to act as a replacement for the recently canceled Ellen DeGeneres Show.

=== Coastal ABC ===
WJAR-DT2 broadcasts 22 hours of locally produced newscasts each week (with four hours each weekday and one hour each on Saturdays and Sundays). These newscasts utilize an anchorless format. The subchannel also airs Sinclair's The National News Desk twice each weekday. During breaking news and severe weather events, live coverage is simulcast from the main channel.

Initially, when the subchannel began broadcasting ABC programming on December 1, 2025, newscasts were carried over from WLNE, using the "ABC 6" branding and were produced from WLNE's studios in the Orms Building in downtown Providence by its own in-house staff, with weather and sports reports provided by WJAR. "NBC 10" news talent filled in for "ABC 6" anchors when the latter was unavailable. This practice continued until January 9, 2026.

On January 10, the "ABC 6" social media pages were updated to the "Coastal ABC" name and logo. Also on this date, WJAR-DT2 began simulcasting "NBC 10" newscasts, likely seen as a transitional phase. On January 12, it was announced that "Coastal ABC" would officially launch on-air on January 19, with its own newscasts produced from WJAR's studios in Cranston.

Coastal ABC airs the Sunday morning public affairs program In the Arena, hosted by former Providence mayor Joe Paolino, Jr., which debuted in June 2016 on WLNE. The show's title is a reference to a passage in President Theodore Roosevelt's Citizenship in a Republic speech about "The Man in the Arena".

=== Ocean State Networks (2012–2024) ===
Ocean State Networks logo

On May 2, 2012, WJAR partnered with Cox Communications to launch the Ocean State Networks (OSN) (though referred to plurally, the OSN had only one channel), serving as a replacement for NewsChannel 5 (formerly the Rhode Island News Channel), which was co-operated by Cox and WLNE-TV from November 30, 1998, until February 1, 2012. OSN aired rebroadcasts of WJAR's non-network and syndicated programming, including its newscasts, lifestyle show Studio 10, Special Olympics R.I., and 10 News Conference.

Prior to 2017, it also aired Cox Sports programming, including live, local, high-school and collegiate sports events with teams featured on OSN, including the Pawtucket Red Sox, Providence Friars, Rhode Island Rams, and Rhode Island Interscholastic League. The launch of YurView New England on the channel adjacent to OSN (channel 4/1004) had those sports moved there, and the remainder of the channel's life was devoted to replays of WJAR programming.

OSN was wound down on April 30, 2024, after the end of Cox's news-share agreement with Sinclair, as streaming versions of its stations, including WJAR, began to launch on several ad-supported streaming services, including its existing availability on Sinclair's NewsOn service.

== Notable former and current on-air and production staff ==
- Christiane Amanpour
- Brooke Anderson (Note: Previously, she was a culture and entertainment anchor and producer for CNN and served as co-host for Showbiz Tonight on HLN. Based at CNN's Los Angeles bureau, Anderson joined the network in July 2000.)
- Steve Berthiaume
- Denise LeClair Cobb
- Dylan Dreyer
- Jack Edwards
- Al Gomes
- Ted Knight
- Matt Lauer
- Kathryn Tappen
- Jim Taricani
- Meredith Vieira
- Doug White
- Patrice Wood

== Technical information ==
=== Subchannels ===
The station's signal is multiplexed:

Subchannels of WJAR
| Subchannel | Res. | Short name | Programming |
|---|---|---|---|
| 10.1 | 1080i | NBC | NBC |
| 10.2 | 720p | ABC | ABC |
| 10.3 | 480i | Charge! | Charge! |
| 10.4 | 480i | Comet | Comet |

In January 2009, WJAR began broadcasting the Retro Television Network on its second digital channel and digital cable. WJAR-DT2 had previously carried NBC Weather Plus. WJAR replaced RTV with MeTV on September 26, 2011, as part of a groupwide affiliation agreement with Media General; the channel replaced RTV on some Media General-owned stations in other markets.

On September 1, 2022, MeTV was replaced with Charge!.

=== Analog-to-digital conversion ===
WJAR ended regular programming on its analog signal, over VHF channel 10, on February 17, 2009, the original date on which full-power television stations in the United States were to transition from analog to digital broadcasts under federal mandate (which was later pushed back to June 12, 2009). The station's digital signal remained on its pre-transition UHF channel 51, using virtual channel 10. This allowed ShopNBC station WWDP to begin operation of its permanent digital facility on channel 10.
