= WALE (Rhode Island) =

Radio station in Greenville–Providence, Rhode Island (1961–2010)

- Greenville, Rhode Island; United States
- Broadcast area: Providence, Rhode Island
- Frequency: 990 kHz

Programming
- Affiliations: ABC News Now

Ownership
- Owner: Cumbre Communications Corp.

History
- First air date: April 12, 1961
- Last air date: August 18, 2010
- Former call signs: WLKW (1961–1987); WEAN (1987–1989)
- Call sign meaning: Whaling City (calls began on 1400 AM in Fall River, Massachusetts)

Technical information
- Facility ID: 49128
- Class: B
- Power: 50,000 watts (day); 5,000 watts (night)
- Transmitter coordinates: 41°57′18.4″N 71°35′37.2″W

WALE (990 AM) was a radio station licensed to the community of Greenville, Rhode Island, and serving the Providence, Rhode Island, area. The station was last owned by Cumbre Communications Corp. The Federal Communications Commission (FCC) announced that the station's license was deleted on April 1, 2014.

== History ==
=== WLKW ===
WLKW began official broadcasting on April 12, 1961, as Rhode Island's only 50 kW radio station during daylight hours only. This fact was noted in the calls as "LKW" really reads as "50 (L in Roman Numerals) KiloWatts" (sic). For most of its life the station's format was easy listening. After being dropped from this station, the WLKW call sign was used by 790 AM from 1989 to 1997, on 550 AM in Pawtucket from 1997 to 2000, and on 1450 AM in West Warwick from 2002 to 2017.

=== As WALE ===
The station was assigned the WALE call sign from the FCC on July 24, 1989. The WALE callsign was held for some 25 or so years by a different company operating WHTB out of the basement of an abandoned theater in Fall River, Massachusetts. Colonel Milton Mittler (formerly of WADK) was the owner.

When Francis Battaglia's North American Broadcasting Company bought WEAN, they attempted to program a talk format. The top-rated show at this time was hosted by Rhode Island talk show legend Steve White (d. 2004). WALE nearly lost its FCC license when, on July 9, 1991, it broadcast that Steve White had been shot and killed during his afternoon talk show. The news report led to an immediate response by local law enforcement and media and the station soon after announced that the report was "a dramatization". White, who had been the most popular radio talk show host in Rhode Island in the early 1980s, was fired immediately after the incident, which, effectively, ended his long career as a local radio personality.

In the summer of 1991, WALE host Bob Giammarco was recognized by Arbitron as having the top-rated evening program (After Hours with Bob Giammarco) in the market. This was no small feat considering the evening signal was quite low and the listening area was limited.

As the 1990s wore on, the station added more and more brokered programming until the station aired nothing but brokered programming. While much of its programming was from doctors, lawyers and practitioners of alternative medicine, WALE earned a reputation in the Providence area as having fringe programming, such as American Dissident Voices program of the neo-Nazi National Alliance, which aired from 4-4:30 p.m. on Saturdays. WALE was also the home of Rick Adams, a follower of Willis Carto's Liberty Lobby, who aired discussions promoting Holocaust denial.

WALE was first attempted to be sold in 2002 to Jerry Evans' Moon Song Communications, but was ultimately sold at a bankruptcy auction in 2003 to Cumbre Communications, where it reemerged as "Supermax 990", a Spanish-language format. Cumbre also attempted to change WALE's call letters to WMAX, which was impossible due to an existing AM station in Bay City, Michigan already holding the callsign. Cumbre Communications declared bankruptcy themselves in 2004 to try to avoid completing their purchase of the station after they learned the transmitter site had serious environmental issues.

WALE went silent on December 29, 2006, and returned to the airwaves in late 2007 at half power. In January 2008, the station requested permission to go silent again based on a technical problem causing the transmitter to consume a quantity of electricity that made the station "economically unfeasible" to operate. The FCC rejected that request. According to the filing, Cumbre Communications is still in bankruptcy, as a "debtor in possession".

At one point the station wasi airing a Spanish-language adult contemporary format as "Amor 990" (Love 990).

The station was an affiliate of the Red Sox Beisbol Network in 2005 & 2008.

In 2009, it went back on the air as "WALE ABC Radio News Now 990" and became an affiliate of ABC News Radio. For a brief period, they broadcast an audio feed of WLNE-TV's former 24-hour cable news television channel, NewsChannel 5 (formerly the Rhode Island News Channel), in various timeslots. On Labor Day 2009, WALE carried WLNE's entire broadcast of The Jerry Lewis MDA Labor Day Telethon, which was being simulcast on NewsChannel 5 (now operated by WJAR as Ocean State Networks (OSN)). An assortment of odd brokered fare also emerged once again on the station.

As of August 18, 2010, WALE was noted as silent. As of April 1, 2014, it had not filed for a renewal of its license and it was deleted by the FCC
