= WSTL =

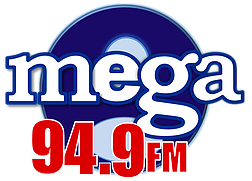

Providence, Rhode Island; United States
- Broadcast area: Providence metropolitan area
- Frequency: 1220 kHz
- Branding: La Mega 94.9

Programming
- Format: Spanish tropical

Ownership
- Owner: Nelson Diaz; (Diaz Holdings, LLC)
- Operator: Radio Sharon Foundation

History
- First air date: 1947
- Former call signs: WRIB (1947–2006)
- Call sign meaning: We Shine The Light

Technical information
- Licensing authority: FCC
- Facility ID: 9183
- Class: D
- Power: 1,000 watts (day); 166 watts (night)
- Transmitter coordinates: 41°49′15.36″N 71°23′5.2″W
- Translator: 94.9 W235CN (Providence)

Links
- Public license information: Public file; LMS
- Webcast: Listen live
- Website: www.lamega949fm.com

WSTL (1220 AM, "La Mega 94.9") is a radio station licensed to serve Providence, Rhode Island. The station is owned by Nelson Diaz's Diaz Holdings, LLC, and broadcasts a Spanish tropical format programmed by Radio Sharon Foundation. Its programming is also heard on translator station W235CN (94.9 FM).

Known as WRIB from 1947 to July 7, 2006, the station changed its call sign to WSTL on July 7, 2006.

== History ==
The station was started in 1947 as a 250-watt daytimer, WRIB with studios at the old Narragansett Hotel. In 1952, WRIB increased its daytime power to the current 1 kilowatt.

For many years, WRIB had aired mostly brokered programming, serving as an outlet for primarily ethnic broadcasters. Faith Christian Center, an evangelical megachurch in nearby Seekonk, Massachusetts, bought WRIB in 2005. While the station's time brokers had expected to be forced to find new homes for their programming, Faith Christian took WRIB off the air at 12:30 on July 7, 2006, with no advance warning, angering many of WRIB's former time brokers. The church only gave the time brokers a few hours to get their equipment out of the studios or face charges for trespassing. Some shows continue on other stations (e.g.: the Armenian Radio Hour is now on WARA) but others disappeared.

On the morning of Friday, June 23, 2017, the station reported to be going off the air soon; it then went silent. On November 29, 2017, WSTL returned to the air with Spanish tropical, branded as "Mega 94.9" (simulcast on FM translator W235CN 94.9 FM Providence).

== Translators ==
Broadcast translator for WSTL
Call sign	Frequency	City of license	FID	ERP (W)	Class	Transmitter coordinates	FCC info
W235CN	94.9 FM	Providence, Rhode Island	41191	250	D	41°49′40″N 71°22′7″W	LMS

WSTL previously operated a second translator, W229AN (93.7), which began carrying the station's programming in December 2008. While still owned by Diaz Holdings, in January 2025 W229AN began simulcasting the second HD Radio channel of WVEI-FM, which is programmed by The Juice Broadcasting Network.
