= WHJJ =

- Providence, Rhode Island; United States
- Broadcast area: Southern New England
- Frequency: 920 kHz
- Branding: News Radio 920 AM & 104.7 FM

Programming
- Language: English
- Format: Talk
- Affiliations: Fox News Radio; Compass Media Networks; Premiere Networks; VSiN Radio

Ownership
- Owner: iHeartMedia, Inc.; (iHM Licenses, LLC)
- Sister stations: WHJY; WSNE-FM; WWBB

History
- First air date: September 6, 1922
- Former call signs: WJAR (1922–1980)
- Former frequencies: 833 kHz (1922–1925); 980 kHz (1925–1926); 620 kHz (1926–1928); 800 kHz (1927); 890 kHz (1928–1941)

Technical information
- Licensing authority: FCC
- Facility ID: 37234
- Class: B
- Power: 5,000 watts
- Transmitter coordinates: 41°46′53.4″N 71°19′53.2″W
- Translators: 104.7 W284BA (Warwick, relays WSNE-FM HD2)
- Repeater: 93.3 WSNE-FM HD2 (Taunton, Massachusetts)

Links
- Public license information: Public file; LMS
- Webcast: Listen live (via iHeartRadio)
- Website: newsradiori.iheart.com

WHJJ (920 kHz, "News Radio 920 & 104.7 FM") is a commercial radio station in Providence, Rhode Island. It carries a talk radio format and is owned by iHeartMedia, Inc. Its studios and offices are on Oxford Street in Providence.

WHJJ transmits 5,000 watts around the clock, from its transmitter site off Wampanoag Trail (Rhode Island Route 114) in East Providence. A single non-directional tower is used during the day, providing at least secondary coverage to all of Rhode Island and the Massachusetts South Coast. At night, WHJJ switches to a directional antenna using a two tower array to protect other stations on 920kHz and adjacent frequencies.

Programming is also relayed by FM translator W284BA on 104.7 MHz, as well as 93.3 WSNE-FM HD2.

== History ==
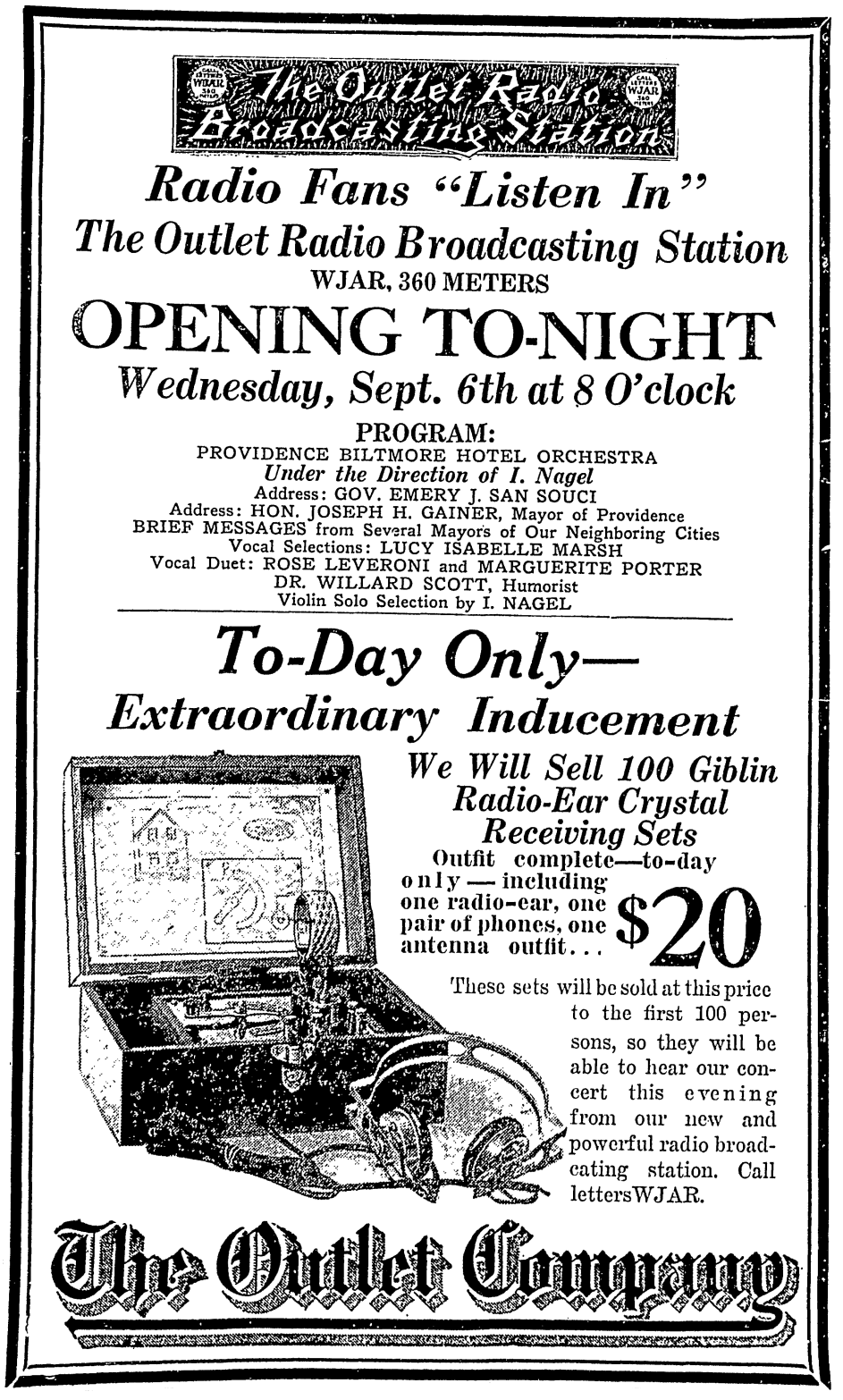
WJAR, owned by The Outlet Company, made its debut broadcast on September 6, 1922.

On December 1, 1921, the U.S. Department of Commerce, in charge of radio at the time, adopted a regulation formally establishing a broadcasting station category, which set aside the wavelength of 360 meters (833 kHz) for entertainment broadcasts, and 485 meters (619 kHz) for farm market and weather reports.

On August 2, 1922, "The Outlet Company (J. Samuels & Bro.)", a Providence department store, was issued a license for new station. The original callsign, WJAR, was randomly assigned from a sequential roster of available call signs. This station made its formal debut broadcast beginning at 8 p.m. on September 6, 1922, transmitting on the shared 360-meter "entertainment" wavelength. WJAR was the second Providence broadcasting station, and the second operated by a department store, following the June 5, 1922, licensing of WEAN to the Shepard Company. A third local department store radio station was later established, by Cherry & Webb's WPRO.

In May 1923, a group of "Class B" frequencies was made available, reserved for higher-powered stations with superior programming. In early 1925, WJAR was assigned to a "Class B" frequency of 980 kHz. As of the end of 1926, the station was reported to be broadcasting on 620 kHz.

In the fall of 1927, WJAR was briefly assigned to 800 kHz, although it was quickly returned to 620 kHz. On November 11, 1928, as a result of a major national reallocation implemented under the Federal Radio Commission's General Order 40, the station moved to 890 kHz. On March 29, 1941, under the provisions of the North American Regional Broadcasting Agreement, stations on 890 kHz, including WJAR, moved to 920 kHz, which has been the station's assignment ever since.

WJAR was a charter member of the NBC Red Network upon its launch on November 15, 1926. (It previously was a member of the Red Network's predecessor operated by AT&T and its station in New York City, WEAF, as early as 1922). In the 1950s, as NBC Radio cut back its programming hours, WJAR began more local programming, playing middle of the road (MOR) music with live personality disc jockeys. By the 1970s, WJAR's format had switched to Top 40 music, where it briefly gave longtime format leader WPRO some competition. Later, WJAR's format eased over to adult contemporary.

In 1980, under a "grandfathered" exemption, The Outlet Company owned both WJAR and a television station, WJAR-TV, in Providence. The company now sought permission to purchase a local FM station, WRLM, which required receiving a waiver from the Federal Communications Commission (FCC), because new co-owned radio-TV holdings were normally prohibited. Outlet proposed that the Franks Broadcasting Company purchase WJAR, and, to make the waiver more acceptable, Franks would in turn sell its current AM station, WHIM, to East Providence Broadcasting, which was controlled by Henry Hampton, thus creating the first minority-owned station in the state. By a 3-2 vote, the FCC approved the transfers. (In later years, due to fewer ownership restrictions, WRLM (now WSNE-FM) and WHJJ became sister stations.)

As part of the sale, Outlet retained the heritage WJAR call letters for its television station. Therefore, on August 14, 1980, the original AM station became WHJJ, with the new call sign selected so it would appear alphabetically next to its sister FM station, WHJY, in Arbitron ratings lists. The new owners briefly continued the adult contemporary sound, but eventually went in the direction of talk radio. In the mid-1980s, WHJJ attempted to shore up its news image by adopting an "All News, All Morning Till 9" format. From 5-9 every morning (including weekends), WHJJ broadcast a dual-anchor news, weather, sports, and traffic format. The format was similar to all-news radio stations such as WCBS and WINS in New York.

Former logo of the radio station

WHJJ was the Rhode Island affiliate of Air America Radio in 2004 and 2005, airing progressive talk programs from Rachel Maddow and Al Franken. In 2005 and 2006, WHJJ won Associated Press awards for the Massachusetts/Rhode Island area; the 2005 award was for special events coverage of the Democratic National Convention, while the 2006 honor was for news station of the year.

Logo before translator sign on

In December 2006, WHJJ owner Clear Channel Communications (now known as iHeartMedia) fired afternoon drive time veteran Arlene Violet, after 16 years, as part of a company-wide cost-cutting measure. In 2013, WHJJ was rebranded as "NewsRadio 920", replacing conservative morning talk host Helen Glover with Rhode Island Radio Hall Of Famer Ron St. Pierre, to present a more news-centric program. In December 2020, St. Pierre left the station as the station picked up Jim Polito's morning show, heard already on two Massachusetts sister stations: WTAG in Worcester and WHYN in Springfield.

== Former personalities ==
- Former Providence Mayor Buddy Cianci hosted a talk show on WHJJ from 1984 to 1991.
- NBC staff announcer Don Pardo received his start at WJAR in 1938.
- Former Rhode Island attorney general Arlene Violet hosted a talk show on WHJJ (c. 1990–December 2006)
