= WSJW =

- Pawtucket, Rhode Island; United States
- Broadcast area: Providence, Rhode Island
- Frequency: 550 kHz
- Branding: Relevant Radio 550 AM

Programming
- Format: Catholic talk radio
- Network: Relevant Radio

Ownership
- Owner: Relevant Radio; (Relevant Radio, Inc.)

History
- First air date: February 12, 1950
- Former call signs: WPAW (1950–1961); WXTR (1961–1972); WGNG (1972–1985); WICE (1985–1995); WPNW (1995–1997); WLKW (1997–2000); WICE (2000–2001); WDDZ (2001–2011); WBZS (2011–2012)
- Call sign meaning: St. Joseph the Worker

Technical information
- Licensing authority: FCC
- Facility ID: 67578
- Class: B
- Power: 1,000 watts (day); 500 watts (night)
- Transmitter coordinates: 41°54′20.36″N 71°23′54.2″W
- Translator: (107.5 MHz) W298DE (Warwick)

Links
- Public license information: Public file; LMS
- Webcast: Listen live
- Website: relevantradio.com

WSJW (550 AM) is a radio station licensed to Pawtucket, Rhode Island, serving the Providence area. Established in 1950 as WPAW, the station is owned by Relevant Radio, Inc. and airs Catholic talk radio programming.

== History ==
In 1948, a construction permit was issued for 500 watts on 1380 kHz for Pawtucket, Rhode Island. The station went on the air in 1950 as WPAW with local origination studios and transmitter originally located on the grounds of the affiliated "Peoples Coal Company" coal yard at 75 Mill Street in Cumberland, Rhode Island. In 1952, it moved to 550 kHz, and on October 13, 1961, the station was renamed WXTR. Broadcast studios and transmitter were moved to along the Blackstone River at 101 John Street in Cumberland, Rhode Island. On March 25, 1972, the call letters changed to WGNG ("Gold-N-Great") with the station adopting an oldies format. It quickly switched to top 40 in early 1973, then to "mellow rock" in the spring of 1977.

Around 1980, the station returned to its "Gold-N-Great" format. The next callsign change occurred on Halloween 1985 when the station changed its call to WICE (which were vacated from 1290 in Providence, now WPVD). In 1992, WICE took on a country music format as "WHIM Country", though the WICE call sign was retained; during this period, the format and WHIM call sign had been vacated from WHIM's longtime home on 1110 (now WPMZ) in favor of CNN Headline News station WWRX. After 1110 returned to the WHIM call sign and country format in 1993, WICE moved to a sports talk format.

In 1995, WICE was sold to Back Bay Broadcasters, owner of Boston business-talk station WBNW, with the intention of making it a Providence-market simulcast of WBNW; the callsign was changed to WPNW on June 16, 1995. WPNW, while largely a simulcast of WBNW, aired separate advertisements, along with Providence-market news, weather, and traffic inserts from Metro Networks. The format was retained when WBNW was sold in December 1996; however, WBNW's local programming was cancelled, and virtually all of WPNW's programming was thereafter provided by Bloomberg Radio. After two years of business talk, WPNW took on the adult standards programming of WLKW (790 AM, now WPRV), which had switched to a sports format, on October 20, 1997, with the WLKW call sign following suit on December 12, 1997.

WLKW relaunched as a talk radio station, "Talk 550 the Buzz", on September 20, 1999. On July 17, 2000, the WICE calls returned. On April 2, 2001, the station joined Radio Disney after being sold by AAA Entertainment (the former Back Bay Broadcasters) to ABC, Inc.; WICE replaced WHRC (1450 AM, now WWRI) as Providence's Radio Disney affiliate. On May 16, 2001, the station became WDDZ.

The Walt Disney Company took WDDZ, and three other stations slated to be sold, off the air on September 30, 2010. A deal to sell the station to Salem Communications was reached that November; after returning to the air, it ran in conjunction with Boston sister station WEZE (the descendant of WBNW). The callsign was changed to WBZS on January 1, 2011, when the WDDZ callsign was moved to the Radio Disney affiliate in Pittsburgh, Pennsylvania; on March 14, 2011, the station relaunched with a business talk format. The call sign changed to WSJW when the station was acquired by Starboard Media Foundation and the format changed to Catholic radio on March 17, 2012.

== Translator ==
Call sign	Frequency	City of license	FID	ERP (W)	Class	Transmitter coordinates	FCC info
W298DE	107.5 FM	Warwick, Rhode Island	202828	250	D	41°45′22″N 71°26′40″W	LMS
