= WBLQ (AM) =

- Westerly, Rhode Island; United States
- Broadcast area: Southern Rhode Island, Southeastern Connecticut
- Frequency: 1230 kHz C-QUAM AM stereo
- Branding: Stereo 1230 and 103.1 FM WBLQ

Programming
- Format: Full service

Ownership
- Owner: Rick W. Schmidt; (Turn Up Your Radio, LLC)
- Sister stations: WWRI

History
- First air date: July 1, 1949
- Former call signs: WERI (1949–1999); WXNI (1999–2009)

Technical information
- Licensing authority: FCC
- Facility ID: 71722
- Class: C
- Power: 1,000 watts
- Transmitter coordinates: 41°21′57.26″N 71°50′9.25″W
- Translator: 103.1 W276DF (Westerly)

Links
- Public license information: Public file; LMS
- Webcast: Listen live
- Website: www.wblq.net

WBLQ (1230 AM) is a radio station licensed to serve Westerly, Rhode Island. The station is owned by Rick W. Schmidt's Turn Up Your Radio, LLC. Its programming is also carried on FM translator W276DF (103.1).

== History ==
=== WERI ===
The station, then called WERI, began broadcasting on 1230 kHz on July 1, 1949, using a daytime and nighttime power of 250 watts, non-directional. The station still uses its original 185-foot, Blaw-Knox, self-supporting tower, on Margin Street, beside the Pawcatuck River.

In the 1960s, the Federal Communications Commission (FCC) increased the daytime power of all Class IV AM stations to 1,000 watts. WERI still had to reduce power to 250 watts at night, as did all other stations on the same frequency.

In 1966, WERI added FM service with WERI-FM 103.7 (now WPVD-FM). The FM antenna was initially mounted to the side of the AM tower on Margin Street in downtown Westerly. The FM station broadcast for only a few days from this location before it was shut down due to harmonic interference to TV channel 12. In 1968, WERI-FM moved its transmitter to a new location on Route 3 in Ashaway, and began regular broadcasting.

In the 1970s, the FCC increased the nighttime power of all Class IV stations from 250 to 1,000 watts, including WERI.

In the 1980s, WERI-FM moved its transmitter closer to Providence, changed callsign to WWRX, and effectively became a Providence station. In the 1990s, WWRX was sold to an independent owner from WERI.

=== WXNI ===
In 1999, WERI was sold to Boston University, and the callsign was changed to WXNI on January 4. As WXNI, it aired a format of news and talk from National Public Radio. It was a repeater of WRNI in Providence, and the two stations combined to provide a locally focused NPR member for Rhode Island–the forerunner of what evolved into Rhode Island Public Radio and then the radio service of Ocean State Media.

=== WBLQ ===
In December 2007, BU reached an agreement to sell WXNI to Diponti Communications for a reported $350,000. The move came after a local group took control of WRNI and acquired WAKX (later WRNI-FM, now WNPE) in Narragansett Pier to serve as its southern satellite. Diponti Communications announced its intention to move the local news and variety programming of WBLQ-LP (96.7 FM, Ashaway, Rhode Island) to WXNI's more powerful AM signal. On November 29, 2009, WXNI changed its callsign to WBLQ; it would begin broadcasting in C-QUAM AM Stereo.

WBLQ began broadcasting on FM translator W276DF (103.1 MHz) in November 2019.

On December 1, 2001, WBLQ began airing the "Time Machine", Weekends presented By Chris Dipaola, Tommy Stafford, DJ Gadget and the Cali Kid.

On the night of October 13, 2022, WBLQ owner Chris DiPaola died unexpectedly from an apparent heart attack. This came shortly after the station had settled with the city of Westerly on a five-year lease extension.

In May 2025, Turn Up Your Radio LLC filed to acquire WBLQ, translator W276DF, along with West Warwick sister station WWRI and translator W288EE on 105.5 MHz, in a $250,000 deal. The sale was completed in October 2025; principal Rick W. Schmidt vowed to continue the stations' local programming.

== Translator ==
Call sign	Frequency	City of license	FID	ERP (W)	Class	Transmitter coordinates	FCC info
W276DF	103.1 FM	Westerly, Rhode Island	26347	250	D	41°21′57.4″N 71°50′9.2″W	LMS
