= WWRI =

Radio station in West Warwick, Rhode Island

- West Warwick, Rhode Island; United States
- Broadcast area: Kent County; Providence metropolitan area
- Frequency: 1450 kHz
- Branding: Classic Rock I-105.5 and 1450 AM

Programming
- Format: Classic rock

Ownership
- Owner: Rick W. Schmidt; (Turn Up Your Radio, LLC)
- Sister stations: WBLQ

History
- First air date: August 15, 1956
- Former call signs: WWRI (1955–1969); WSVP (1969–1973); WKRI (1973–1995); WHIM (1995–1998); WDYZ (1998–2000); WHRC (2000–2001); WWRI (2001–2002); WLKW (2002–2017); WPVD (2017–2020)
- Call sign meaning: West Warwick, Rhode Island

Technical information
- Licensing authority: FCC
- Facility ID: 15959
- Class: C
- Power: 1,000 watts (unlimited)
- Transmitter coordinates: 41°41′38.36″N 71°31′24.22″W
- Translator: 105.5 W288EE (West Warwick)

Links
- Public license information: Public file; LMS
- Webcast: Listen live
- Website: i951classicrock.wixsite.com/kentcountyrocks

WWRI (1450 AM) is a radio station licensed to West Warwick, Rhode Island, and serving the Providence metropolitan area. The station is owned by Rick W. Schmidt, through licensee Turn Up Your Radio, LLC, and broadcasts a classic rock radio format.

WWRI transmits with 1,000 watts of power. It is also heard on FM translator W288EE in West Warwick, on 105.5 MHz. It uses the FM translator’s frequency in its moniker "I-105.5".

== History ==
=== WWRI ===
The AM 1450 frequency was a longtime home to WWRI, later WKRI, a community station serving the West Warwick area. WWRI began broadcasting August 15, 1956. WWRI was initially headquartered at 1501 Main St. in West Warwick. Its first licensee and president was W. Paul Oury. On October 8, 1957, WWRI was sold to Melvin Green's Grelin Broadcasting. The next change of ownership occurred on February 8, 1969, when RSVP Inc. bought WWRI. By this time, WWRI was an ABC radio affiliate.

=== WSVP ===
In 1969, the station was bought by MediAmerica Broadcasting, the company that owned WYRE (a daytimer on 810 kHz) that put a listenable signal into both Baltimore and Washington, D.C., with just 500 watts. They changed the calls to WSVP – the call letters standing for "The Suburban Voice of Providence"; although that slogan was rarely, if ever used on the air.

Owner Ernie Tannen installed Jim Hooker, later to become a successful radio sales trainer, as the general manager. He hired Bill Hennes, then programming WNHC in New Haven, Connecticut, as a consultant in hopes of competing for Providence ad dollars. He put in place a Drake-like format using Johnny Mann jingles, however the station had to be oldies based since there were already two established hit-music stations in greater Providence along with several other stations that bled in from outside the market. The station failed to make a dent in WPRO's dominance, but since they sounded big they attracted listeners. The 1,000-watt daytime signal made the station listenable in Providence, but in those days they had to reduce power to 250 watts at night which limited it to just Kent County after dark.

The station was one of the launching pads for air talent in the northeast. During its brief lifespan an all-star team went through there, including Buzz Brindle, Jack Casey, Dick Downes (using Bob Lawrence), G. Michael McKay, Dusty Brooks, Paul Payton, Bill Donovan, Jim Edwards and Charlie Stone.

Famous disc jockeys from Boston's WRKO sometimes volunteered their time to developing WSVP's air talent, by traveling long distances from their homes in Massachusetts and New Hampshire, offer their major-market talent and consulting to the small station, which was also considered a training ground for RKO General Top 40 stations.

=== WKRI ===
WSVP would not last long as on December 1, 1972, RSVP sold WSVP to Consolidated Communications, Inc., which changed the call sign to WKRI in 1973. WKRI was sold again in 1977 to Algonquin Broadcasting Company. Rainbow Broadcasting bought WKRI on October 5, 1979. Rainbow Broadcasting moved WKRI out of its longtime home of 1501 Main St. in West Warwick to its new location of 1585 Centerville Road in the same town. WKRI's next change of ownership came on February 16, 1984, when it was bought by WKRI Broadcasting Inc. Under WKRI Broadcasting's ownership, WKRI increased its nighttime power to 1,000 watts.

WKRI Broadcasting sold WKRI to DBH Broadcasting on June 3, 1986. 1989 would bring another change of ownership: Atlantic Broadcasting System Inc. purchased WKRI on July 3, 1989. Atlantic Broadcasting became American Independent Radio, which then became DBH Broadcasting again. This was partially owned by Richard Bouchard, who also owned WNRI in Woonsocket; WKRI and WNRI would be sister stations from 1986 until 1995. WKRI was sold to Providence Broadcasting in 1995 for $200,000. The station's weekend Spanish-language programming moved to WPMZ (1110 AM) in East Providence, the former WHIM, while WHIM's call sign and country music programming moved to 1450.

=== Radio Disney ===
Hibernia of Rhode Island bought WHIM in 1997 and affiliated it with Radio Disney, flipping the station to the format on December 12, 1997. In March 1998, the call sign were changed to WDYZ; in January 2000, the station changed to WHRC. Hibernia sold its stations, including WHRC, to ABC/Disney in 2000.

=== WWRI (again), WLKW, WPVD ===
Logo for WLKW/WPVD as ESPN 1450 Providence, used from 2009 to 2019.

After Disney acquired WICE (550 AM, now WSJW) in April 2001 and moved Radio Disney there, it sold WHRC to Hall Communications; and on June 20, 2001, the station dropped Radio Disney and began simulcasting urban oldies with New Bedford sister station WNBH and returned to its original WWRI call sign.

In July 2002, WWRI's call sign was changed to WLKW; the following month, WLKW and WNBH changed to an adult standards format. WLKW was an affiliate of the Pawsox Radio Network until 2009. The stations switched to ESPN Radio on February 2, 2009. The call sign changed to WPVD on September 6, 2017. After 10 years as a full-time ESPN Radio affiliate, WPVD switched to a simulcast of sister station WCTK, "Cat Country 98.1", on February 1, 2019. Also at that time, WNBH switched to a classic hits format and re-launched as "Big 101.3", referring to its FM translator station, W267CY, on February 11, 2019. The station is also carried on the HD2 sub-channel of WCTK.

On October 1, 2020, the programming on WWRI-LP moved to 1450 AM and 105.5 FM. At that time, WWRI-LP went silent on 95.1 FM. On October 1, 2020 at 5:30 p.m., WPVD relaunched with the sign-on of new FM translator signal, 105.5 W288EE in West Warwick, under the branding, "I-105.5". On October 30, 2020, Hall Communications consummated the sale of WPVD and W288EE to Chris DiPaola's DiPonti Communications, LLC. On November 3, 2020, the station changed its call sign to its historical WWRI.

Following Chris DiPaola's death in October 2022, DiPonti Communications agreed to sell WWRI and WBLQ to Rick Schmidt's Turn Up Your Radio LLC for $250,000 in May 2025. The sale was completed in October 2025; Schmidt vowed to continue the stations' local programming.

== Translator ==
Broadcast translator for WWRI
| Call sign | Frequency | City of license | FID | ERP (W) | Class | Transmitter coordinates | FCC info |
|---|---|---|---|---|---|---|---|
| W288EE | 105.5 FM | West Warwick, Rhode Island | 202750 | 250 | D | 41°41′34.7″N 71°37′52.8″W | LMS |

After originally filing on January 31, 2018, for a construction permit (CP) to sign-on a 78-watt FM translator on 107.5 MHz but amending their CP request to 107.1 MHz with 15 watts and, later, 10 watts (because WSJW also selected 107.5 MHz as the frequency in their FM translator application but their signal was much larger so Hall Communications decided to amend their CP to a different frequency), Townsquare Media New Bedford License, LLC filed a Petition to Deny against the amendment to the CP request (most likely out of concern for the potential for "co-channel interference" with WFHN in nearby Fairhaven, Massachusetts) and later to 1 watt on 107.1 MHz (only to also have that amended CP challenged), the FM translator application for WPVD was amended to 106.9 MHz (with 2 watts) on February 19, 2019. On May 6, 2019, the FCC granted this FM translator application a 3-year CP (because there were no objections to the CP being amended to 106.9 MHz), in spite of the likely heavy "adjacent-channel shortspacing" with WMJX in nearby Boston that this new 2-watt FM translator may encounter; this translator was granted the callsign W295DJ. On October 2, 2019, the FCC granted Hall Communications permission to have the FM translator application for WPVD amended to 105.5 MHz (with 250 watts, the maximum for FM translator stations), meaning that this FM translator will be short-spaced on the frequency with WQGN-FM in Groton, Connecticut; the callsign of this translator was changed to W288EE to reflect its amendment to 105.5 MHz. On October 1, 2020, at 5:30 p.m., this translator signed on-the-air.
