= Providence metropolitan area =

Providence Metropolitan Area
- Metropolitan Statistical Area
- Providence–Warwick, RI-MA Metropolitan Statistical Area
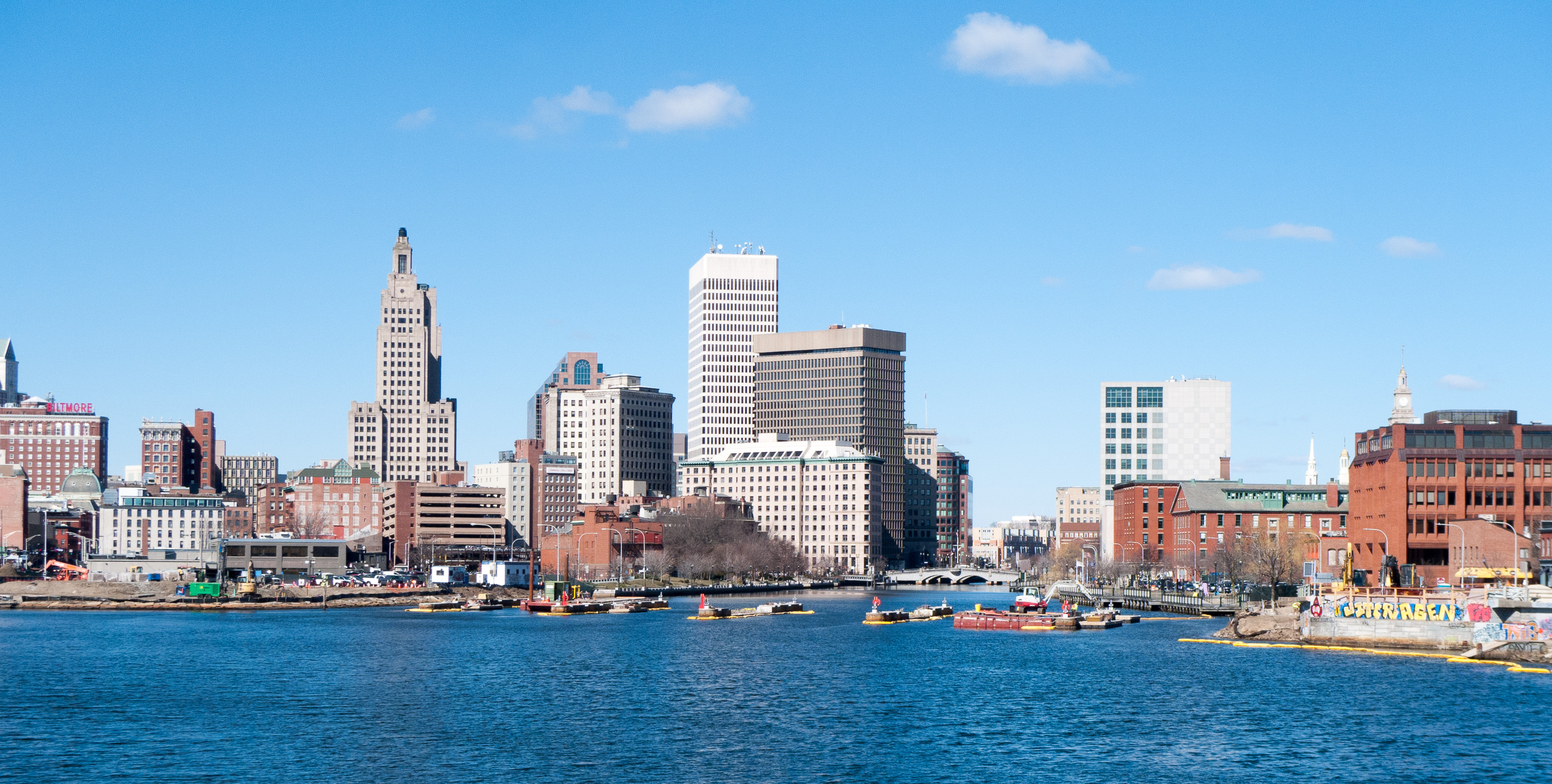
- The skyline of Providence, Rhode Island
Map of Providence–Warwick, RI–MA MSA
City of Providence
Providence–Warwick, RI–MA MSA
Other Counties in the Boston, MA CSA
- Country: United States
- State: Rhode Island; Massachusetts
- Largest city: Providence, RI
- Other cities: New Bedford, MA; Fall River, MA; Warwick, RI; Pawtucket, RI; Cranston, RI; Taunton, MA; Attleboro, MA

Area
  - Total: 1,635.76 sq mi (4,236.6 km^{2})
- Highest elevation: 812 ft (247.5 m)
- Lowest elevation: 0 ft (0 m)

Population (2005 est.)
  - Total: 1,612,989
  - Rank: 38th in the U.S.
  - Density: 986.2/sq mi (380.78/km^{2})

GDP
  - MSA: $105.561 billion (2022)
- Time zone: UTC−5 (EST)
  - Summer (DST): UTC−4 (EDT)

The Providence metropolitan area (Providence MSA) is a region extending into eight counties in two states. Its core is in the states of Rhode Island and Massachusetts; its largest city is Providence, Rhode Island. With an estimated population of 1,708,161 in 2025, exceeding that of Rhode Island by slightly over 60%, the Providence MSA is the 39th largest metropolitan area in the United States. The MSA covers all of Rhode Island and Bristol County, Massachusetts, with an average population density of 2300 per mi^{2} (888 per km^{2}).

The region's Gross Metropolitan Product is the country's 42nd largest at $64.7 billion, just above the Gross State Product of the entire state of Hawaii. Since 2006, the Providence metropolitan area has been officially included in the Greater Boston Combined Statistical Area (CSA), the sixth-largest CSA in the country, with over eight million residents.

== Boundaries ==
=== Metropolitan statistical area ===
The Providence-Warwick, RI-MA Metropolitan Statistical Area (defined at the county level by the U.S. Office of Management and Budget) contains all five counties in Rhode Island and one county in Massachusetts, namely:

- Bristol County, Rhode Island
- Kent County, Rhode Island
- Newport County, Rhode Island
- Providence County, Rhode Island
- Washington County, Rhode Island
- Bristol County, Massachusetts

Its principal cities are Providence and Warwick, Rhode Island; other cities in the MSA include:

- East Providence, Rhode Island
- Pawtucket, Rhode Island
- Cranston, Rhode Island
- Newport, Rhode Island
- Woonsocket, Rhode Island
- Fall River, Massachusetts
- New Bedford, Massachusetts
- Attleboro, Massachusetts
- Taunton, Massachusetts

=== NECTA ===
The Providence-based NECTA (defined at the municipal level by the Office of Management and Budget) does not include the separate New Bedford NECTA, but they are unified in a Combined NECTA.

The Providence-Fall River-Warwick RI-MA NECTA includes:

- All cities and towns in Rhode Island except Westerly
- In Worcester County, Massachusetts: Blackstone and Millville
- In Norfolk County, Massachusetts: Bellingham and Plainville
- In Bristol County, Massachusetts: North Attleborough, Attleboro, Seekonk, Rehoboth, Swansea, Somerset, Fall River, and Westport

== Transportation ==
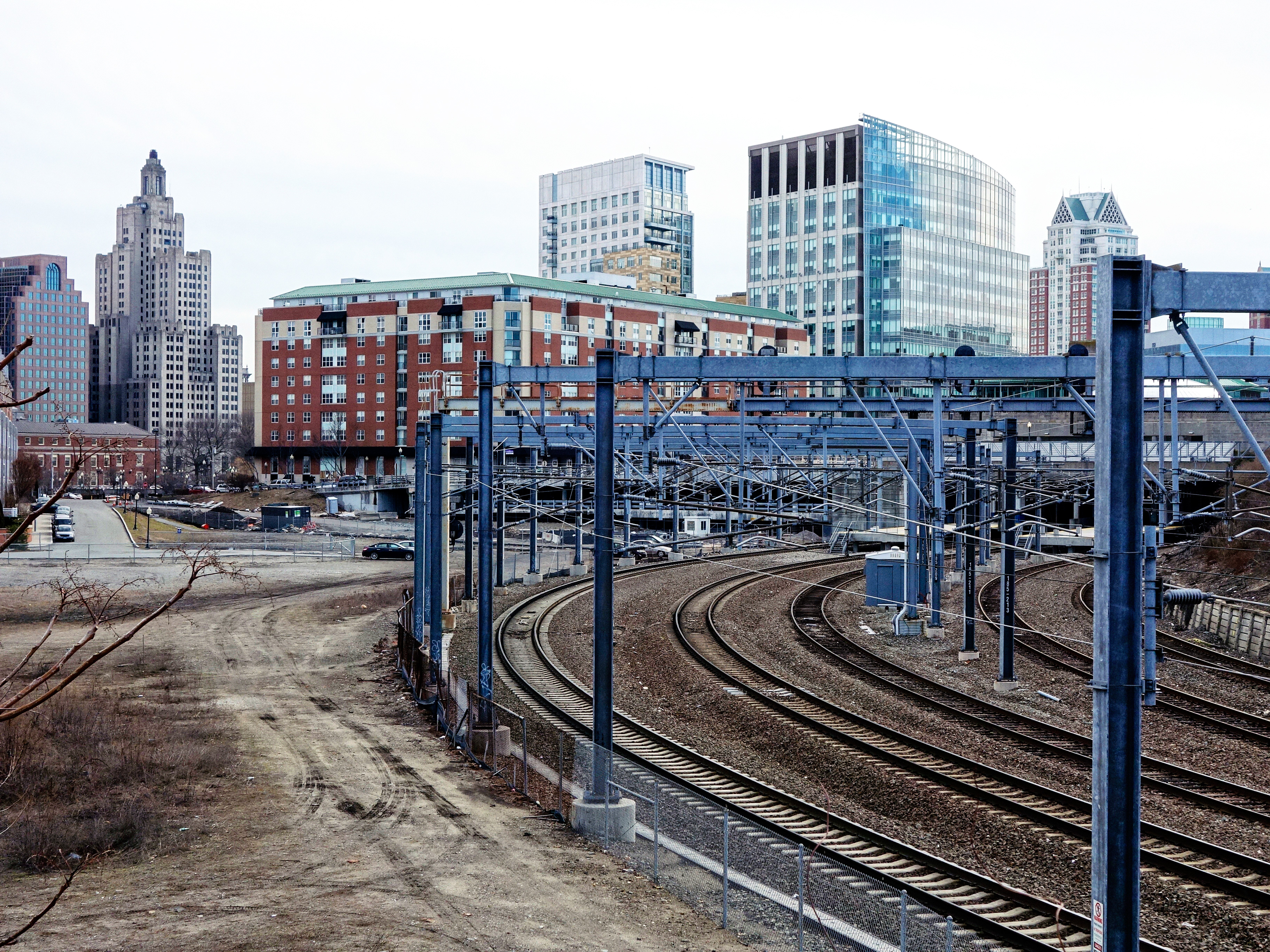
Tracks leading to Providence Station

=== Rail ===
The Massachusetts Bay Transportation Authority (MBTA) operates commuter rail in the region, with the Providence branch of the Providence/Stoughton Line connecting the metropolitan area to Boston. Existing Providence line stations in Providence, South Attleboro, Attleboro and Mansfield were supplemented by an extension to T.F. Green Airport in Warwick and Wickford Junction in North Kingstown, Rhode Island, completed in 2012. A new Pawtucket/Central Falls station on the Providence Line opened in January 2023.

The Fall River/New Bedford Line opened to the South Coast cities in March 2025. The proposed second phase of the South Coast Rail project would add Battleship Cove station and a different routing to Boston.

Amtrak provides regional rail service over the Northeast Corridor to the Providence and Kingston train stations. Northeast Regional trains stop at both stations, while Acela service is available in Providence.

=== Bus transit ===
Rhode Island Public Transit Authority (RIPTA), which has its hub in downtown Providence, manages local bus transit for the state, serving 35 out of 39 Rhode Island communities as well as South Attleboro and Seekonk, Massachusetts. RIPTA operates 55 bus lines as well as Flex service and paratransit service. Ferry services link Block Island, Prudence Island, and Hog Island to the Rhode Island mainland. Additionally, there is a seasonal ferry service between Providence and Newport from late May to mid-October. Southeastern Regional Transit Authority (SRTA) provides local bus service in the Massachusetts locales of Fall River and New Bedford. The Greater Attleboro Taunton Regional Transit Authority (GATRA) serves much of the Massachusetts portion of the metropolitan area, and areas eastward to the South Shore.

=== Air transport ===
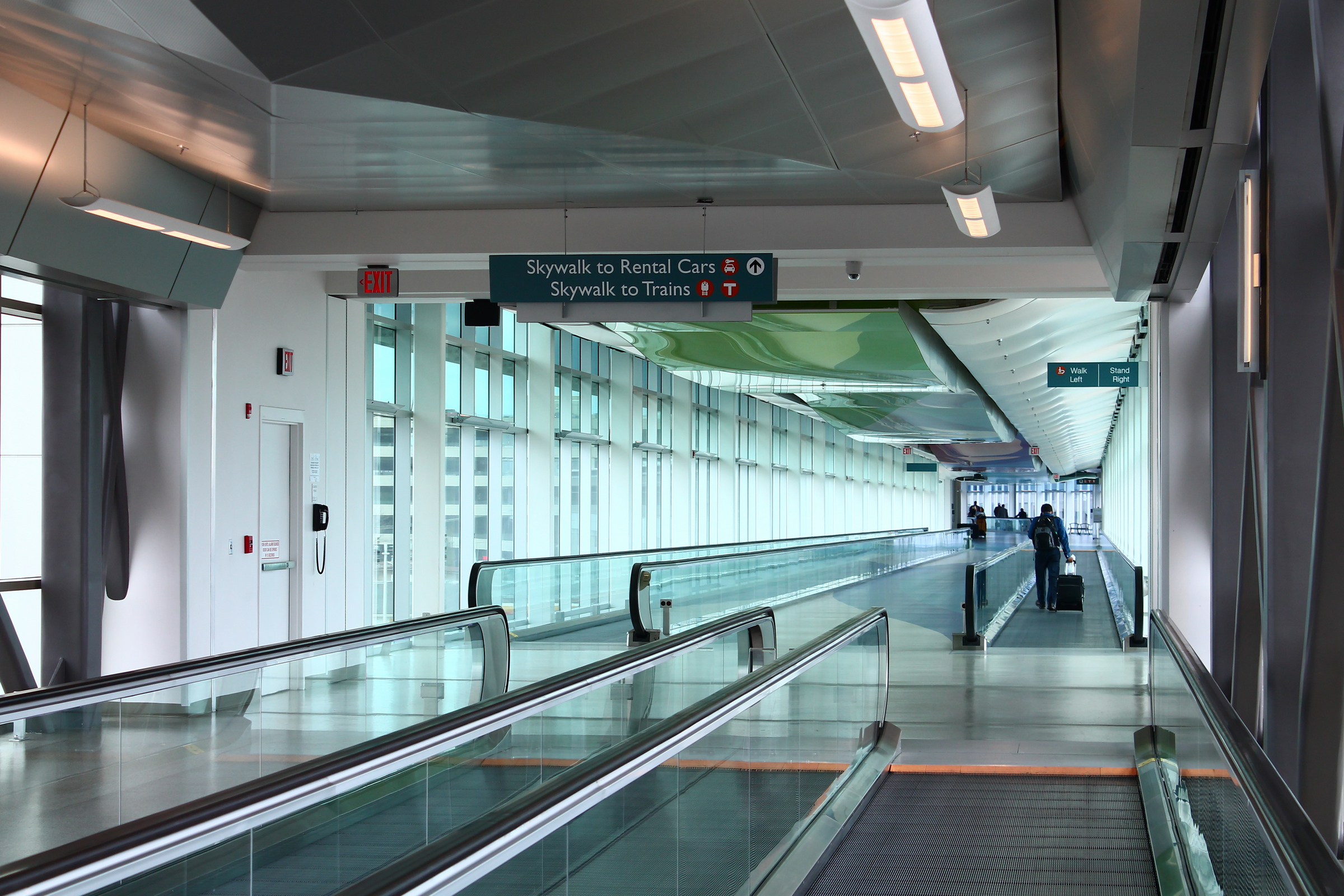
T. F. Green Airport in Warwick

The major airport is T. F. Green Airport in Warwick, (though its airport code is PVD) though Logan International Airport in Boston is also used. The MBTA Providence/Stoughton Line passes through T.F. Green and connects the airport to Providence and Boston, offering additional airport flexibility in the Greater Boston Area.

=== Roads ===
Two interstates connect major population centers in the region: 95, which runs diagonally across Rhode Island and connecting with Boston and New York City, and 195, which runs east from Providence into Fall River and New Bedford. The auxiliary interstate 295 provides a bypass around Providence.

Additional highways serving the area include Route 146 (connecting Providence and Worcester), Route 138 (serving Newport), Route 24 (connecting Fall River and Newport with the Boston area), Route 4 (serving the Wickford area), Route 99 (connecting Route 146 with Woonsocket) and Route 140 (connecting Route 24 with New Bedford).

== Demographics ==
Historical population
Census	Pop.	Note	%±
1900	623,832		—
1910	794,906		27.4%
1920	895,577		12.7%
1930	981,085		9.5%
1940	998,794		1.8%
1950	1,063,384		6.5%
1960	1,257,976		18.3%
1970	1,391,026		10.6%
1980	1,421,795		2.2%
1990	1,509,789		6.2%
2000	1,582,997		4.8%
2010	1,600,852		1.1%
2020	1,676,579		4.7%
2022 (est.)	1,673,802		−0.2%
data source:

Significant Lusophone populations exist across the region, particularly the area from East Providence to New Bedford. The two Bristol counties (RI and MA) are the only counties in the U.S. in which Portuguese-Americans are the largest ancestry group.

County	State	Seat	2025 estimate	2020 census	Change	Land area	Density
Providence	Rhode Island	Providence	678,179	660,741	+2.64%	410 sq mi (1,100 km^{2})	1,654/sq mi (639/km^{2})
Bristol	Massachusetts	Taunton	593,640	579,200	+2.49%	553 sq mi (1,430 km^{2})	1,073/sq mi (414/km^{2})
Kent	Rhode Island	East Greenwich	173,495	170,363	+1.84%	169 sq mi (440 km^{2})	1,027/sq mi (396/km^{2})
Washington	Rhode Island	South Kingstown	129,795	129,839	−0.03%	329 sq mi (850 km^{2})	395/sq mi (152/km^{2})
Newport	Rhode Island	Newport	83,051	85,643	−3.03%	102 sq mi (260 km^{2})	814/sq mi (314/km^{2})
Bristol	Rhode Island	Bristol	50,001	50,793	−1.56%	24 sq mi (62 km^{2})	2,083/sq mi (804/km^{2})
Total			1,708,161	1,676,579	+1.88%	1,587 sq mi (4,110 km^{2})	1,076/sq mi (416/km^{2})
