= Mass media in the Providence metropolitan area, Rhode Island =

The city of Providence, Rhode Island is part of a media market that includes New Bedford, Massachusetts. The area is served by several local television stations, radio stations, newspapers, and blogs based in the cities proper and the surrounding communities of Rhode Island and Bristol County, Massachusetts.

== Broadcast television ==
Providence is the center of Southern New England's broadcasting market, which also encompasses Bristol County, Massachusetts, which includes the cities of Fall River and New Bedford. The city is served by television stations representing every major American television network, as well as radio stations originating from Providence and Boston.

Channel	Call Sign	Networks	Owner
6	WLNE-TV	.1 Roar.2 Grit.3 Ion Mystery.5 MeTV	Standard Media (operated by Sinclair Broadcast Group)
8	WYCN-LD	.1 Telemundo.2 TeleXitos.3 Cozi TV.4 NBC True CRMZ	Telemundo Station Group
10	WJAR	.1 NBC.2 ABC.3 Charge!.4 Comet	Sinclair Broadcast Group
12	WPRI-TV	.1 CBS.2 MyNetworkTV.3 True Crime Network.4 Defy	Nexstar Media Group
17	WVMA-CD	Antenna TV	Woodland Communications, LLC (operated by Vision Communications)
28	WLWC	Court TV	Inyo Broadcast Holdings
36	WSBE-TV	PBS	Ocean State Media
51	WRIW-CD	.1 Telemundo.2 Cozi TV.3 Oxygen	Telemundo Station Group
64	WNAC-TV	.1 Fox.2 The CW.3 Rewind TV.4 Antenna TV	Mission Broadcasting (operated by Nexstar Media Group)
69	WPXQ-TV	.1 Ion Television.2 Laff.3 Busted.4 Bounce TV.5 Game Show Central.6 HSN.8 QVC	Ion Media (subsidiary of the E. W. Scripps Company)

== Radio ==
Providence is the center of Southern New England's broadcasting area, with many radio stations located in the city and surrounding communities, as well as some radio stations located in Greater Boston, Central Massachusetts, and eastern Connecticut.

AM Stations	Call Sign	Owner
550 kHz	WSJW	Relevant Radio
630 kHz	WPRO (AM)	Cumulus Media
790 kHz	WPRV	Cumulus Media
920 kHz	WHJJ	iHeartMedia
1110 kHz	WPMZ	Videomundo Broadcasting
1220 kHz	WSTL	Faith Christian Church
1290 kHz	WPVD	Ocean State Media
1320 kHz	WARA	Attleboro Access Cable Systems
1340 kHz	WNBH	Hall Communications
1400 kHz	WHTB	RVDE, LLC
1420 kHz	WBSM	Cumulus Media
1450 kHz	WWRI	DiPonti Communications, LLC
1480 kHz	WSAR	Bristol County Broadcasting
1590 kHz	WARV	Blount Communications

FM Stations	Call Sign	Owner
88.1 MHz	WELH	The Wheeler School
89.3 MHz	WNPN	Ocean State Media (Newport)
91.3 MHz	WDOM	Providence College
91.5 MHz	WCVY	Coventry Public Schools
92.3 MHz	WPRO-FM	Cumulus Media
93.3 MHz	WSNE-FM	iHeartMedia
94.1 MHz	WHJY	iHeartMedia
95.5 MHz	WLVO	K-Love
98.1 MHz	WCTK	Hall Communications (New Bedford, MA)
99.7 MHz	WEAN-FM	Cumulus Media (Wakefield)
101.5 MHz	WWBB	iHeartMedia
101.1 MHz (share-time)	WBRU-LP; WFOO-LP; WVVX-LP	Brown Student Radio; AS220; Providence Community Radio
102.7 MHz	WNPE	Ocean State Media (Narragansett)
103.7 MHz	WPVD-FM	Ocean State Media (Westerly)
105.1 MHz	WWLI	Cumulus Media
106.3 MHz	WWKX	Cumulus Media (Woonsocket)

== Newspapers ==
Several newspapers serve the Providence-New Bedford media market.

Newspaper	Owner
Attleboro Sun-Chronicle	United Communications Corporation
Fall River Herald News	GateHouse Media
New Bedford Standard-Times	Dow Jones Local Media Group
Mothers News (defunct)	Rhododendron Festival
The Providence Journal	GateHouse Media
The Providence Phoenix (defunct)	Phoenix Media/Communications Group
Providence Business News	Providence Business News, Inc
Taunton Daily Gazette	GateHouse Media

== Television and movie productions ==
Providence and the surrounding area have been used as a backdrop for several movies and television series and the city remains invested in bringing filmmakers to its location, as is evidenced by a 25% tax credit on all Rhode Island spending offered to motion picture companies.

The animated television series Family Guy takes place in Quahog, a fictional suburb of Providence, and prominently features the most pronounced segment of Providence's skyline several times an episode (the buildings are One Financial Plaza, 50 Kennedy Plaza, and the Superman Building).

The city and its name were used in the television series Providence, and Showtime's new series, Brotherhood, was also filmed and set in Providence.

The Farrelly brothers used the city as a backdrop for several of their movies, notably Dumb and Dumber and There's Something About Mary. Peter Farrelly set Outside Providence in Pawtucket, adjacent to Providence. The 1991 American-Canadian film Providence takes place at Brown University. Although not set in Providence, the movie Amistad used the exterior of the Rhode Island State House as the United States Capitol exterior. The movie Little Children was also filmed in Providence. In 2006, Providence was the primary filming location for the film Underdog.
