= WMVI =

WMVI may refer to:

- WMVI (FM), a radio station (106.7 FM) licensed to Mount Vernon, Indiana, United States
- WMVY, a radio station (88.7 FM) licensed to Edgartown, Massachusetts, United States, which held the call sign WMVI from May to June 2014
- WMEX-LP, a low-power radio station (105.9 FM) licensed to Rochester, New Hampshire, United States, which held the call sign WMVI-LP in May 2014
- WSSV, a radio station (1160 AM) licensed to Mechanicville, New York, United States, which held the call sign WMVI from 1972 to 2002
