= WRNI =

WRNI may refer to:

- WNPE, a radio station (102.7 FM) licensed to Narragansett Pier, Rhode Island, United States, which held the call sign WRNI-FM from 2007-2018, and WRNI for part of 2018.
- WPVD (AM), a radio station (1290 AM) licensed to Providence, Rhode Island, United States, which held the call sign WRNI from 1998 to 2018.
