= WEEI =

WEEI may refer to:

- WEEI (AM), a radio station (850 AM) licensed to serve Boston, Massachusetts, United States
- WEEI-FM, a radio station (93.7 FM) licensed to serve Lawrence, Massachusetts
- WPVD-FM, a radio station (103.7 FM) licensed to Westerly, Rhode Island, United States, which held the call sign WEEI-FM from 2004 to 2011
- WEZE, a radio station (590 AM) licensed to Boston, Massachusetts, which held the call sign WEEI from 1924 to 1994
- WBGB (FM), a radio station (103.3 FM) licensed to Boston, Massachusetts, which held the call sign WEEI-FM from 1948 to 1983
