= Evening News =

Evening News may refer to:

== Television news ==
- CBS Evening News, an American news broadcast
- ITV Evening News, a UK news broadcast
- JNN Evening News, a Japanese news broadcast
- Sumatera Utara Hari Ini, a North Sumatra news broadcast aired on TVRI North Sumatera
- Evening News, an alternate name for News Hour in some broadcasting regions

== Newspapers ==
=== Australia ===
- The Evening News (Rockhampton), an evening newspaper published in Rockhampton, Queensland, Australia
- The Evening News (Sydney), an evening newspaper published in Sydney, New South Wales from 1867 to 1931

=== China ===
- Xinmin Evening News, a newspaper published in Shanghai, China
- Yanzhao Evening News, a tabloid newspaper published in Shijiazhuang, Hebei Province, China

=== United Kingdom ===
- Evening News (London), an evening newspaper published in London from 1881 to 1980, when it merged with the Evening Standard
- Cambridge Evening News, a daily newspaper published in Cambridge, England
- Edinburgh Evening News, a newspaper based in Edinburgh, Scotland
- London Evening News, a newspaper that was first published in 1855 in London, England
- Manchester Evening News, a daily newspaper published in Manchester, England
- Norwich Evening News, a daily newspaper published in Norwich, Norfolk, England
- Worcester News, a tabloid newspaper known as the Worcester Evening News until 2005, based in Worcester, England

=== United States ===
listed alphabetically by state

- The Evening News (San Jose), a newspaper from 1886 until 1927 in San Jose, California
- The Evening News (Jeffersonville), a daily newspaper serving Jeffersonville and Clark County, Indiana
- The Evening News (Newburgh), a former U.S. newspaper published in Newburgh, New York, 1961—1990
- Fall River Daily Evening News, previously published in Fall River, Massachusetts
- Southbridge Evening News, a daily newspaper in Southbridge, Massachusetts
- The Evening News (Sault Ste. Marie), a local newspaper in Sault Ste. Marie, Michigan
- The Evening News, a newspaper that became part of The Patriot-News in Harrisburg, Pennsylvania
- The Evening News (Providence), a daily newspaper serving Providence, Rhode Island

== Other uses ==
- "The Evening News" (Chamillionaire song), a song from the album Ultimate Victory
- The Evening News (novel), a 1990 novel by Arthur Hailey
- "The Evening News" (song), a 2007 song by rapper Chamillionaire from the album, Ultimate Victory
- The Evening News (short story collection), 1986 book by Tony Ardizzone
