= Deborah Diesen =

American children's book author

- Occupations: Author, writer
- Writing career
- Language: English
- Genre: Children's literature
- Notable work: Pout-Pout Fish book series
- Website: deborahdiesen.com

Deborah Diesen is an American children's book author. Her book The Pout-Pout Fish was chosen by Time magazine as a Top 10 Children's Book of 2008. It was also selected for the Michigan Reads! literacy program.

In 2019, The Pout-Pout Fish was adapted into a musical by Christopher Anselmo and Jared Corak. It premiered at the New Victory Theater in Manhattan, New York, produced by TheatreWorksUSA. An animated film adaptation of the same name was released in January 2026.

== Personal life ==
Diesen lives in Grand Ledge, Michigan. In addition to a writer, she is the financial manager for a nonprofit.

== Bibliography ==
=== The Pout-Pout Fish ===
Illustrated by Dan Hanna and published by Farrar, Straus, & Giroux Books for Young Readers

- Picture books
  - The Pout-Pout Fish, 2008
  - The Pout-Pout Fish in the Big-Big Dark, 2010
  - The Pout-Pout Fish Goes to School, 2014
  - The Pout-Pout Fish Learns to Read, 2015
  - The Not Very Merry Pout-Pout Fish, 2015
  - The Pout-Pout Fish and the Bully-Bully Shark, 2017
  - The Pout-Pout Fish Far, Far from Home, 2017
  - Pout-Pout Fish: Easter Surprise, 2018
  - The Pout-Pout Fish and the Can't-Sleep Blues, 2018
  - Pout-Pout Fish: Lucky Leprechaun, 2019
  - Pout-Pout Fish: Back to School, 2019
  - Pout-Pout Fish: Haunted House, 2019
  - Be Thankful, Pout-Pout Fish, 2019
  - Pout-Pout Fish: Christmas Spirit, 2019
  - The Pout-Pout Fish Cleans Up the Ocean, 2019
  - Pout-Pout Fish: Special Valentine, 2019
  - Pout-Pout Fish Goes to the Doctor, 2020
  - Pout-Pout Fish: Goes to the Dentist, 2020
  - 5-Minute Pout-Pout Fish Stories, 2020
  - The Pout-Pout Fish and the Worry-Worry Whale, 2022
- Board books
  - Smile, Pout-Pout Fish, 2014
  - Sweet Dreams, Pout-Pout Fish, 2015
  - Kiss, Kiss, Pout-Pout Fish, 2015
  - Trick or Treat, Pout-Pout Fish, 2016
  - Happy Easter, Pout-Pout Fish, 2017
  - The Pout-Pout Fish Halloween Faces, 2018
  - Happy Hanukkah, Pout-Pout Fish, 2020
- Chapter books
  - You Can Do It, Pout-Pout Fish!, 2019
  - You Can Make a Friend, Pout-Pout Fish!, 2019
  - You Can Be Kind, Pout-Pout Fish!, 2020
  - You Can Read, Pout-Pout Fish!, 2020
- Activity and novelty books
  - Lift-the-Flap Tab: Hide and Seek, Pout-Pout Fish, 2015
  - The Pout-Pout Fish: Wipe Clean Workbook ABC, 1-20, 2015
  - The Pout-Pout Fish Giant Sticker Book, 2016
  - The Pout-Pout Fish Undersea Alphabet Touch & Feel, 2016
  - Pout-Pout Fish Wipe Clean Dot to Dot, 2017
  - The Pout-Pout Fish Look-and-Find Book, 2018

=== Others ===
- The Barefooted, Bad-Tempered Baby Brigade, illustrated by Tracy Dockray, Tricycle Press, 2010
- Picture Day Perfection, illustrated by Dan Santat, Abrams Books for Young Readers, 2013
- Catch a Kiss, illustrated by Kris Aro McLeod, Sleeping Bear Press, 2016
- Bloom, illustrated by Mary Lundquistg, Farrar, Straus, & Giroux Books for Young Readers, 2017
- Pippa and Percival, Pancake and Poppy: Four Peppy Puppies, illustrated by Grace Zong, Sleeping Bear Press, 2018
- Hello, Fall!, illustrated by Lucy Fleming, Farrar, Straus, & Giroux Books for Young Readers, 2018
