= Alice D. Engley Beek =

American watercolorist, writer and lecturer

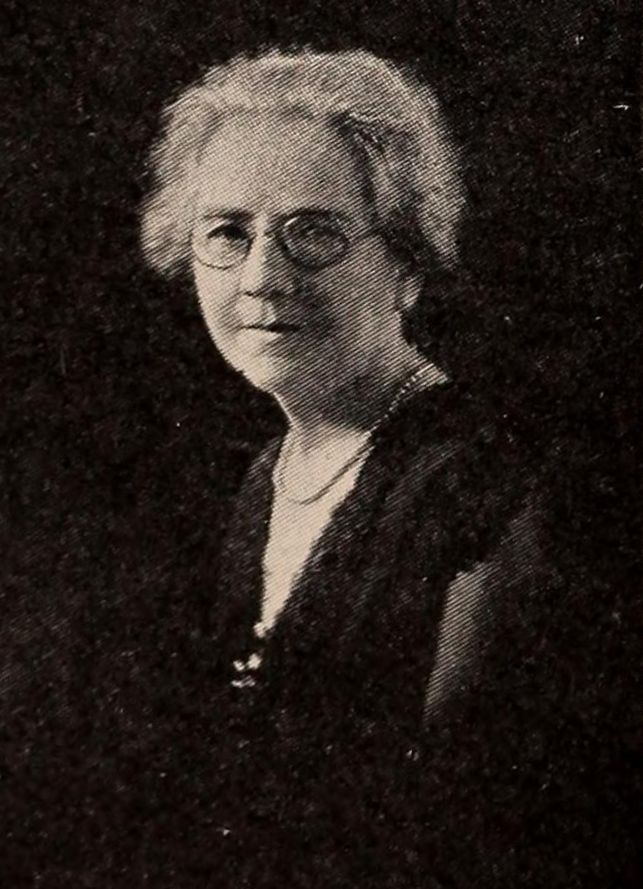
- Portrait photo from Women of the West (1915)
- Born: Alice Dow Engley; June 17, 1876; Providence, Rhode Island, U.S.
- Died: January 27, 1951 (aged 74); Tacoma, Washington, U.S.
- Education: Wheeler Art School; Rhode Island School of Design
- Known for: painter; writer; lecturer
- Style: watercolor
- Spouse: Anthony Beek (m. 1899)
- Awards: International Exhibition (Paris, 1896); Alaska–Yukon–Pacific Exposition (Seattle, 1909); Panama-Pacific International Exposition (San Francisco, 1915)

Alice D. Engley Beek (1876–1951) was an American watercolorist of the Pacific Northwest, whose paintings had a wide vogue. She was also a writer and lecturer on art subjects; her lectures before various organizations were an inspiration to many persons.

== Early life and education ==
Alice Dow Engley was born in Providence, Rhode Island on June 17, 1876. Her father, Major James C. Engley, was a military adviser to President Abraham Lincoln; her mother was Mary Elizabeth (Dow) Engley.

She began her education at Miss Ida M. Gardner's School for Girls, Providence. In the U.S., she studied art at the Wheeler Art School, at Rhode Island School of Design, and with Sydney Richmond Burleigh, Providence. She studied at two French academies including Académie Delécluse and Lazar, Paris. In Paris, she studied with Pierre Puvis de Chavannes, Léon Lhermitte, Tony Robert-Fleury, and Edward Frederick Ertz, while in Holland, she studied with Jozef Israëls.

== Career ==
Beek spent six years in Paris and eight years in Holland. She painted approximately eighty landscapes of New England and approximately two hundred more while in Europe.

From 1897, she served on the Memorial International Jury and Commission of Honor, Paris.

Beek was the leading member of the Tacoma Art League in point of brilliancy of work. She was also a member of the Fine Arts Association and the American Federation of Arts (Washington, D.C.).

== Personal life ==
She married Anthony Beek, of Kampen, Overijssel, Netherlands, on September 28, 1899. They had one son, Frederic Dow Beek.

In politics, she was a Republican. In religion, she was a Congregationalist.

Early in the 20th century, she came to Tacoma, Washington, where she died on January 27, 1951.

== Expositions ==
- International Exhibition (Paris, 1896)
- Alaska–Yukon–Pacific Exposition (Seattle, 1909)
- Panama-Pacific International Exposition (San Francisco, 1915)

== Awards and honors ==
- Cross of Honor, gold medal, and silver medal, International Exhibition, Paris, 1896
- Grand Prix, Cross of Honor, and gold medal, International Exhibition, Paris, 1897, her work (watercolor) being designed as "above competition" at subsequent exhibitions
- Grand Prize and gold medal, Seattle Exposition, 1909
