= Christopher Anselmo =

American songwriter

- Born: January 10, 1994 (age 32); Princeton, New Jersey
- Genres: Musical theatre
- Years active: 2012-present

Christopher Anselmo is an American composer and playwright of musical theatre.

== Early years ==
Born in Princeton, NJ, Anselmo spent the majority of his childhood in Millstone Township, NJ. His first extended venture into songwriting happened at Allentown High School when he wrote a book report on David Copperfield as a song cycle. Anselmo moved to East Greenwich, RI, after his sophomore year of high school; he is a 2012 graduate of The Wheeler School. He attended Northwestern University.

== Career ==
Anselmo's first musical, Fable, was co-written with his childhood friend, H.S. Kaufman. Originally written by Anselmo in high school as a song cycle, he brought Kaufman on to write a script, which would help to transform the collection of songs into a full-length musical. It premiered at New York Musical Theatre Festival (NYMF) in July 2014. Anselmo and Kaufman were the youngest writers ever to be accepted to the festival in history.

Anselmo wrote music and lyrics for The Haunted Train. The show was commissioned and produced by Unmasked Theatre Company at Theater for the New City in October 2015.

After graduating from Northwestern in 2016, Anselmo went on to write music and lyrics for Atlantic: America & The Great War, the second musical in a two-show collaboration between American Musical Theater Project and the Royal Conservatoire of Scotland. Atlantic premiered at the Edinburgh Fringe Festival in 2017.

Anselmo wrote the New York Times' Critic's Pick adaptation of the best-selling children's series, The Pout-Pout Fish, for TheaterWorksUSA. It premiered at the New Victory Theater in October 2019 before embarking on a national tour, which was cut short due to the COVID-19 pandemic.
