= WNPH =

Radio station in Portsmouth, Rhode Island

Currently silent
- Portsmouth, Rhode Island; United States
- Broadcast area: Newport, Rhode Island
- Frequency: 90.7 MHz

Ownership
- Owner: Ocean State Media; (Ocean State Media Group)
- Sister stations: WNPE; WNPN; WPVD; WPVD-FM; WPVD-TV

History
- First air date: 1972
- Former call signs: WJHD (1971–2022); WNPK (2022)

Technical information
- Licensing authority: FCC
- Facility ID: 53078
- Class: A
- ERP: 360 watts
- HAAT: 24 meters (79 ft)
- Transmitter coordinates: 41°36′6.3″N 71°16′18.1″W

Links
- Public license information: Public file; LMS

WNPH (90.7 FM) is a non-commercial educational radio station licensed to Portsmouth, Rhode Island, United States, serving the Aquidneck Island area. The station is owned by Ocean State Media (OSM), the statewide NPR member station for Rhode Island, through licensee Ocean State Media Group.

OSM, as The Public's Radio (TPR), acquired the license in 2021 from Portsmouth Abbey School, a Benedictine institution, which had established it as a classical music station under the WJHD call letters in 1972. After nearly 50 years, the station was taken off the air in 2021 and the license sold. OSM would itself take the station silent and seek to sell it in 2026, after consolidating its radio service onto WPVD-FM.

== History ==
WJHD—named for John Hugh Diman, the founder of the Portsmouth Abbey School—first went into service in early 1972, using only a 10-watt RCA BTE-10C exciter and transmitter, two AR turntables, and a Shure mixer. Father Geoffrey Chase served as the station trustee during the 1970s, 1980s and 1990s. In 1981, the station was approved to increase its effective radiated power to 360 watts. During most of those years, the station was operational only nights and weekends, playing classical music.

In 1999, Father Edmund assumed responsibility for managing the staff and setting the operating hours. Debuting "The Blue Monk," Edmund's show played requests for faculty, parents, and members of the Rhode Island State Police who were listening while on patrol.

Portsmouth Abbey School opted to remove terrestrial broadcasting from its curriculum in 2021. It surrendered WJHD's license to the Federal Communications Commission (FCC) on August 16, 2021; it was cancelled the same day. Later, in early September 2021, Portsmouth Abbey School rescinded its request, and the license was restored. The Public's Radio then purchased WJHD for $7,500 effective November 23, 2021. An application was pending to relocate the transmitter site from the school and to new facilities in South Kingstown, Rhode Island, increasing coverage in the southern portion of the state; the WJHD call sign was changed to WNPK on January 4, 2022. On December 8, 2022, the station's call sign was changed again, this time to WNPH. WNPH was authorized to operate at low power under special temporary authority from FCC pending the station's relocation.

On November 9, 2023, The Public's Radio announced its intention to merge with WSBE-TV, Rhode Island's PBS station; the merger was approved in 2024, and the combined organization became Ocean State Media in 2025. Ocean State Media consolidated its radio service on a single statewide signal, the newly-acquired WPVD-FM 103.7, on May 1, 2026. Following a transition period, the original five-station radio network, including WNPH, was taken silent in July 2026; the licenses will be sold.

== Notable WJHD alumni ==
- Tom Winter, reporter for NBC News
