= WCVY =

- Coventry, Rhode Island; United States
- Frequency: 91.5 MHz

Programming
- Format: AAA/Modern rock
- Affiliations: none

Ownership
- Owner: Coventry Public Schools of Rhode Island; (Coventry Rhode Island Public Schools)

History
- First air date: October 19, 1978
- Call sign meaning: W CoVentrY

Technical information
- Licensing authority: FCC
- Facility ID: 14229
- Class: A
- ERP: 200 watts
- HAAT: 11 meters (36 feet)
- Transmitter coordinates: 41°41′10″N 71°35′37″W

Links
- Public license information: Public file; LMS
- Website: Coventry Schools

WCVY is a local student-run high school radio station in Coventry, Rhode Island that broadcasts on 91.5 FM. The station is owned by Coventry Public Schools of Rhode Island, and broadcasts from Coventry High School. The station broadcasts a combination of adult album alternative (AAA) and modern rock music formats.

The station, which went on the air October 19, 1978, has been assigned these call letters by the Federal Communications Commission (FCC).

From 2007 until 2009, WCVY shared time with Spanish-language religious station WRJI; that station left the air in November 2009 and did not return for over a year, and was thus deleted by the FCC in January 2011. In June 2011, the FCC removed the provision in WCVY's license that only allowed it to operate from 2–10 p.m. on weekdays, as the deletion of WRJI rendered the time-share agreement between the two stations moot. Beginning in July 2011 the station entered a leased-time arrangement with The Public's Radio to rebroadcast then-WNPE's 102.7FM (later WNPN 89.3FM) NPR news/talk programming at all times outside of local student programming; the latter typically being 2-8 p.m. weekdays, whenever school was in session. In April 2021 the lease was not renewed, The Public's Radio simulcast ended, and WCVY was responsible for its own programming.

As of 2024, WCVY 91.5 did not renew their license with the FCC, all links to streams on 3rd party platforms and the Coventry Public Schools website have been removed or no longer work. The last social media was on September 15, 2020 on their Instagram. The reason for the station's disappearance has not been publicly stated.
