= WMEX-LP =

- Rochester, New Hampshire; United States
- Frequency: 105.9 MHz
- Branding: 105.9 WMEX

Programming
- Format: Oldies

Ownership
- Owner: Rochester Radio

History
- First air date: 2014
- Former call signs: WMVI-LP (2014)
- Call sign meaning: Tribute to WMEX in Boston

Technical information
- Licensing authority: FCC
- Facility ID: 195604
- Class: LP1
- ERP: 27 watts
- HAAT: 57 meters (187 ft)
- Transmitter coordinates: 43°17′7.3″N 70°56′27.2″W

Links
- Public license information: LMS
- Webcast: Listen live
- Website: 1059wmex.com

WMEX-LP (105.9 FM, "105.9 WMEX") is a radio station licensed to serve the community of Rochester, New Hampshire. The station is owned by Rochester Radio and airs an oldies format.

The station was assigned the call sign WMVI-LP by the Federal Communications Commission on May 20, 2014. It changed its call sign to WMEX-LP eight days later in a partial swap with WMEX (88.7 FM) in Edgartown, Massachusetts; the new low-power FM station would be run by Gary James as a revival of the oldies format formerly heard on WMEX (106.5 FM) in Farmington (James had been that station's general manager), itself a tribute to WMEX (1510 AM) in Boston.
