= WTKL =

K-Love radio station in North Dartmouth, Massachusetts

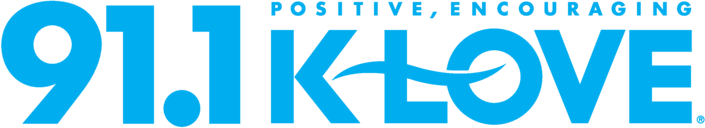
- North Dartmouth, Massachusetts; United States
- Broadcast area: New Bedford–Fall River, Massachusetts
- Frequency: 91.1 MHz
- Branding: K-Love

Programming
- Format: Contemporary Christian
- Network: K-Love

Ownership
- Owner: Educational Media Foundation

History
- First air date: September 1974
- Former call signs: WUSM (1973–1989); WSMU-FM (1989–2006)
- Former frequencies: 90.5 MHz (1974–1981)
- Call sign meaning: "K-Love"

Technical information
- Licensing authority: FCC
- Facility ID: 69407
- Class: A
- ERP: 1,200 watts
- HAAT: 91 meters (299 ft)
- Transmitter coordinates: 41°37′43.4″N 71°0′22.1″W

Links
- Public license information: Public file; LMS
- Webcast: Listen live
- Website: klove.com

WTKL (91.1 FM) is a radio station in North Dartmouth, Massachusetts. It is an owned-and-operated station of the national K-Love Contemporary Christian network, covering the South Coast of Massachusetts from a tower located on the campus of the University of Massachusetts Dartmouth.

Prior to 2006, WTKL was the student-run radio station at the university, when it was known as WUSM and later WSMU-FM; in conjunction with the sign-on of higher-power WUMD 89.3, UMass sold the 91.1 license to the Educational Media Foundation.

== History ==
=== College radio ===
Southeastern Massachusetts University, as it was then known, built and signed on WUSM in September 1974. The station operated with 10 watts at 90.5 MHz and broadcast from studios in the basement of the university residents' cafeteria before moving into the campus center. New Bedford television station WTEV (channel 6) petitioned against the grant of the facility and a series of other educational stations in the area, worried about interference; their petition delayed the station from getting a construction permit by 18 months; obtaining office space on the campus was its own challenge. The station's early years featured a bumpy stretch in 1977, when the general manager and program director were forced out by the governing board over unstated allegations. However, they also featured growth. Through the Intercollegiate Broadcasting System, WUSM obtained a hookup with ABC; programming from the American FM Network began airing on the station on February 19, 1979.

Also in 1979, WUSM was granted a construction permit to move to 91.1 MHz and increase its effective radiated power to 300 watts. On November 13, 1979, the station's existing antenna collapsed in a windstorm, after work had already begun on implementing the frequency change and power increase. The improvements did not take effect, however, until March 27, 1981. On that date, after months of delays, WUSM premiered at its new dial position; as part of its upgraded facilities, the radio station began broadcasting the Talking Information Center, a radio reading service for the blind, on its subcarrier. Approval of a second power increase, to 1,200 watts, came in 1982, after WUSM had already noted an increase in local interest from the first upgrade.

In 1986, WUSM suffered a series of technical challenges: a power surge in the campus center damaged the transmitter and forced the expensive replacement of other parts, and then the station was forced to go to air from its secondary production studio after wires in the main studio board burned out. Throughout the late 1980s, WUSM broadcast a more mainstream alternative format than most college radio stations because it was the only station in the format on the South Coast; the nearest rock station was in Providence.

The station changed its call letters from WUSM to WSMU-FM in 1989. The change allowed another university to trade in call letters it did not want. The University of Southern Mississippi had operated its student radio station as WMSU since the 1970s. When the WUSM calls were made available, they were picked up the next month by that station which now operates as WUSM-FM; that university's president, Aubrey Lucas, announced the change on air, and the station's program manager said, "Obviously we would rather have anything other than MSU".

The station's variety format had several long-running features. DJ Don Dread's reggae show "Roots Radical" went on the air in 1982 and only left WUMD's air in 2012 when he died of a brain tumor.

=== UMD move to 89.3 and sale to EMF ===
In 1993, UMass Dartmouth made an application to build a new radio station at 89.3 MHz, which would have a wider coverage area and be able to serve more listeners. (The application came a year after an adjacent-channel Boston station, WBUR-FM, proposed to have WSMU relocate in order to improve its own coverage area.) The application was approved by the Federal Communications Commission in 2003, and in 2006, construction was completed on WUMD. In January 2006, the university sold the WSMU-FM license for $700,000 to the Educational Media Foundation, with the transmission facility remaining at the university; the sale price helped fund the construction of the new WUMD facility. The sale was a notable step forward for EMF, which prior to acquiring WSMU-FM had little presence in New England due to the price and scarcity of stations in the area; it was also cited as the "first major foray" by FM Christian broadcasting into the region.

UMass Dartmouth programming moved from 91.1 to 89.3 in June 2006, enabling K-Love programming to debut on the new WTKL in early July.
