= WDOM =

Radio station at Providence College in Providence, Rhode Island

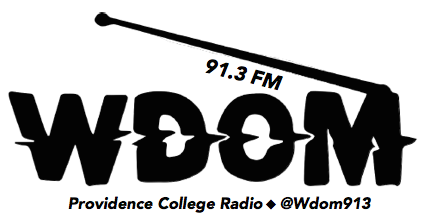
- Providence, Rhode Island; United States
- Frequency: 91.3 MHz

Programming
- Format: College/Indie

Ownership
- Owner: Providence College

History
- Founded: April 28, 1949
- First air date: March 15, 1966
- Call sign meaning: DOMinican Order

Technical information
- Licensing authority: FCC
- Facility ID: 53676
- Class: A
- ERP: 125 watts
- HAAT: 40 m (130 ft)
- Transmitter coordinates: 41°50′39″N 71°26′14″W

Links
- Public license information: Public file; LMS
- Website: student-engagement-leadership.providence.edu/wdom-91-3-fm-providence-college-radio/

WDOM (91.3 FM) is a radio station licensed to Providence, Rhode Island, United States. The station is owned by Providence College and broadcasts from studios and a transmitter on the campus.

WDOM began operations as a carrier current station for the campus in 1949; it began broadcasting on FM for the entire Providence area in 1966. It continues to service the Providence College community and the city of Providence. The station broadcasts indie, hip-hop, alternative, punk, electronica, rap, dance, classic rock, jazz, and country music.

== History ==
On April 28, 1949, WDOM launched as a carrier current radio station serving the Providence College campus on 1450 kHz; a highlight of the first day of programming was an interview with Harry James on the "Guest Band of the Day" segment. That first year, the station broadcast Tuesday and Thursday nights. For 1951, the station broadcast on Mondays, Wednesdays and Fridays, airing for three hours each day. The early years were marked by six frequency changes in the first decades of operation; WDOM moved to Aquinas Hall in 1953, but inconsistency in WDOM's broadcasts prompted a student congress investigation.

More reliable and successful broadcasts came in the mid-1950s as the result of a new transmitter, built by physics students, and equipment donations. By 1964, however, the station had become a non-entity on the campus. The student newspaper, The Cowl, described it as a "phantom frequency" that had only sporadically broadcast.

On November 5, 1965, the Federal Communications Commission awarded Providence College a construction permit for a 10-watt FM station on 91.3 MHz. It was the culmination of FM plans first laid more than 15 years prior. In 1948, the college had obtained a construction permit for a station at 89.9 MHz; at the time Albertus Magnus Hall—the science building which housed the studios—was built, it was mentioned that the plans included FM broadcasting.

After going on the air on March 15, 1966, WDOM increased its broadcast hours—airing ten hours a day—and expanded its sports coverage, including freshman basketball and varsity hockey games. The station continued to broadcast only during the school year. Its music format was Top 40.

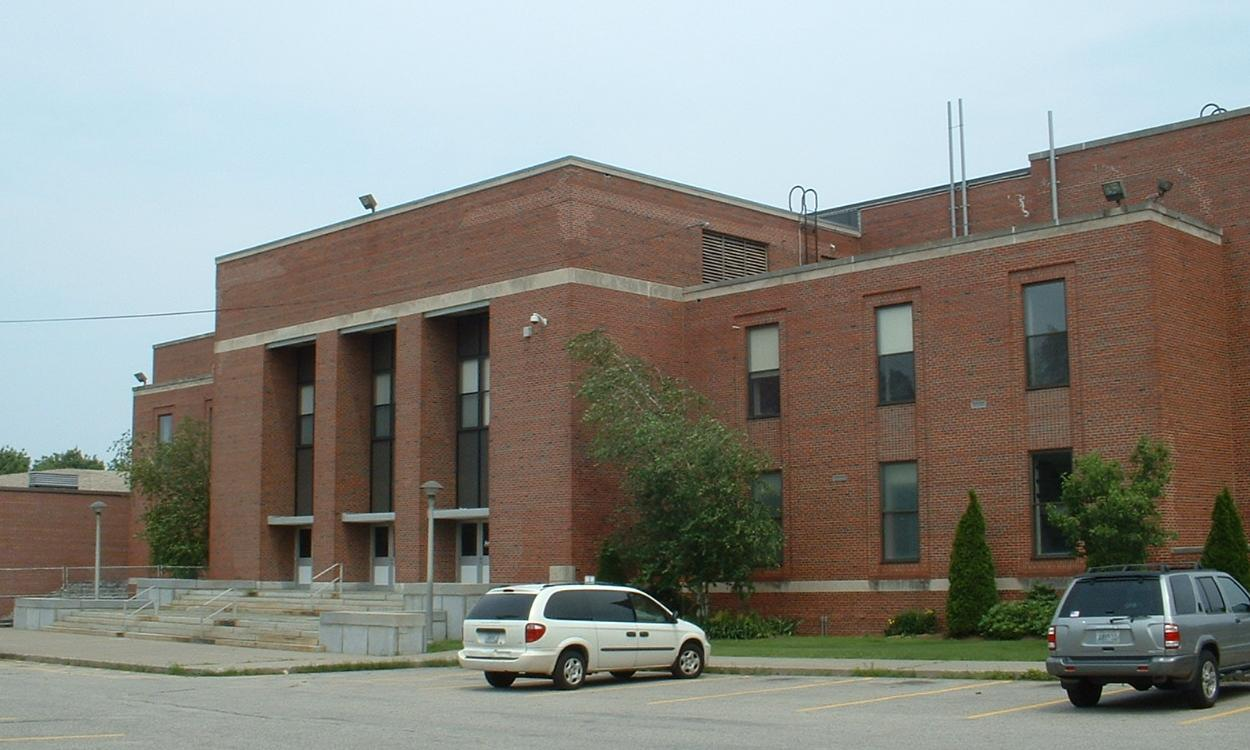
WDOM moved into Alumni Hall in the early 1970s

WDOM grew over the course of the 1970s. The station moved from Alumni Hall to larger quarters in Joseph Hall early in the decade. It had expanded its broadcast day to 21 hours by 1974 and was airing a mix of progressive rock, in-house educational and block programming; it also began to seek a power increase. By 1976, 100 students were involved in the operation of the station, compared to the 15 to 20 who had been around for the FM launch a decade prior. The station's classical record library received a major boost when the former WPJB-FM, which had exited the format, donated its collection to WDOM in 1976.

In the end, however, it was not increased student involvement that prompted Providence College to pursue a facility upgrade, but rather a 1978 FCC rulemaking that required as many 10-watt noncommercial educational stations—like WDOM—as possible to upgrade to at least 100 watts. The college applied to increase power to 125 watts and was approved by the commission on September 8, 1980, and the improved facilities were activated on December 5. The station continued to balance its rock output with jazz and classical programming, unduplicated in Providence. However, even as these programs remained a part of the station's lineup, rock programming was the priority by the mid-1990s at WDOM; it was followed closely by the Urban Beatz hip-hop show on the weekends, which generated the most callers of any program on the station. The station had also begun 24-hour broadcasting on weekends. In the late 1990s, WDOM moved to a new on-campus location in the Slavin Center, giving it higher visibility.

In the immediate aftermath of Hurricane Sandy in 2012, WDOM broadcast Rhode Island Public Radio when WELH, then the network's main transmitter, was knocked off the air. After sending out a message seeking aid, Providence College president Brian Shanley invited the public radio network to use WDOM's facilities, enabling RIPR to continue broadcasting to the immediate Providence area.

Much of the station's equipment was overhauled in 2014; some of it had been in continuous use since the 1990s.

== Notable alumni ==
- Sean McAdam, sports writer and journalist
