= WPVD (AM) =

Radio station in Providence, Rhode Island

Currently silent
- Providence, Rhode Island; United States
- Broadcast area: Providence; Fall River
- Frequency: 1290 kHz
- Branding: Ocean State Media

Programming
- Format: Public radio
- Network: Ocean State Media
- Affiliations: NPR; PRX; APM

Ownership
- Owner: Ocean State Media Group
- Sister stations: WNPE; WNPN; WNPH; WPVD-FM; WPVD-TV

History
- First air date: December 15, 1947
- Former call signs: WNAF (1947–1949); WDEM (1949–1952); WICE (1952–1983); WRCP (1983–1998); WRNI (1998–2018); WRPA (2018–2020); WPPB (2020)
- Call sign meaning: Providence

Technical information
- Licensing authority: FCC
- Facility ID: 48308
- Class: D
- Power: 400 watts day; 16 watts night
- Transmitter coordinates: 41°51′22.86″N 71°26′42.21″W
- Translator: 102.9 W275DA (Providence)

Links
- Public license information: Public file; LMS
- Webcast: Listen live
- Website: www.oceanstatemedia.org

WPVD (1290 AM) is a public radio station in Providence, Rhode Island. It is owned by Ocean State Media. Until going silent in 2026, the station served the few areas of Providence without a clear signal from network flagship WNPN in Newport.

WPVD transmits with 400 watts by day, 16 watts by night, using a one-tower omnidirectional antenna. The transmitter is off Douglas Avenue in North Providence.

On November 23, 2018, the FCC granted a construction permit for W275DA, an FM translator station on 102.9 MHz. On September 30, 2021, W275DA began broadcasting from the same tower as WPRO-FM.

== History ==
The station signed on the air in 1947 as WNAF. The call sign was changed to WDEM in 1949. It changed to WICE in 1952 to signify its broadcasting the Providence Reds hockey team. During the 1960s, WICE presented a top 40 music format. By the 1970s, WICE had switched to a news/talk format featuring Kurt Oden, who later served as an aide to Mayor Buddy Cianci. It was owned by Susquehanna Radio. It switched to Portuguese programming as WRCP in 1983. It changed to English public radio programming as WRNI in 1998. It changed to Spanish programming in 2011, and changed call signs to WRPA in 2018. On July 10, 2020, WRPA’s call changed once again to WPPB.

=== As WICE ===
The station’s callsign was officially changed to WICE on February 21, 1952, with an effective date of March 1, 1952. The change was in reference to the ice the Reds skated on at the Rhode Island Auditorium where the studios were. In 1952, the station manager was Sumner Pearl who also hosted programs throughout the day. In the early days, WICE was full of sports content. WICE Sports Ace Chris Schenkel would broadcast a 'Feature Race of the Day' from Narragansett Park. They would also cover all the Providence Reds games both home and away. This made them competitive with the all-powerful WPRO.

==== 1953 fire ====
On January 4, 1953, a small fire broke out in a storage closet where the WICE studios were located. Local announcer Sherm Strickhouser discovered the fire, and alerted the authorities. After the fire was extinguished, they found the body of 26-year-old popular local disc jockey, Jay Creedon. Creedon was scheduled to return to the air that morning after a four-week hiatus. He had slept the previous night in the storage room, falling asleep with a cigarette in his hand.

=== As an English-language public radio station ===
WRNI's logo from 1998 to 2008, when it was operated by Boston University.

In the 1990s, a group of Rhode Islanders formed the Foundation for Ocean State Public Radio in order to bring a local public radio station to the state. At the time, Rhode Island was the only state in New England (traditionally one of the bedrocks of support for NPR) and one of only two in the entire country (the other being Delaware) that did not have a full-service NPR station within its borders. Most of the state got at least a grade B signal from Boston's WGBH (with Providence itself receiving a city-grade signal) and WBUR. After a few years of looking, they found a partner in Boston University (BU), owner of WBUR. BU agreed to buy WRCP for $1.9 million; the foundation conducted a statewide drive to help raise the funds.

On May 1, 1998, WRCP's calls officially changed to WRNI, and the license was officially transferred to the WRNI Foundation, a separate fundraising group set up by WBUR to handle local underwriting.

Even though BU doubled WRNI's transmission power from 5,000 to 10,000 watts, its signal was not strong enough to reach the southern and western portion of the state (though it provides a city-grade signal to Newport, southern Rhode Island's biggest city). Accordingly, in 1999, BU bought WERI (1230 AM) in Westerly, which had been on the air since 1949. BU changed WERI's calls to WXNI, and made it a full-time satellite of WRNI. The station brought a city-grade NPR signal to southern Rhode Island for the first time ever.

BU and WBUR had ambitious plans for WRNI at first. It moved WRNI from its longtime studio on Douglas Avenue to a state-of-the-art facility at Union Station. It also started a daily two-hour local news magazine, One Union Station. It also had plans to set up a third station to fill the gaps in WXNI's 1,000-watt signal. However, budget problems brought on by the September 11, 2001 attacks forced One Union Station's cancellation. It was replaced with a one-hour news magazine that was canceled in 2004. At that point, WRNI's local operations were significantly cut back, with most of the station's staff either laid off or transferred to Boston. This resulted in WRNI's schedule becoming almost identical to that of WBUR.

==== Controversy over sale ====
On September 17, 2004, with no advance warning, WBUR Group general manager Jane Christo announced that WRNI and WXNI were being put on the market. She would not give any specifics, only saying that it was time for Rhode Islanders to buy the stations if they wanted to keep NPR programming in the state. Indeed, WBUR claimed that it never intended to operate WRNI on a long-term basis, and had only intended to help develop it into a self-sustaining service.

The reaction in Rhode Island was hostile. In an editorial, The Providence Journal said that WBUR had made numerous long-term commitments to WRNI, and claimed that if the station's local backers had to buy WRNI, it would be tantamount to buying the station twice. The announcement led state attorney general Patrick Lynch to open an investigation into WBUR and WRNI.

On September 27, BU interim president Aram Chobanian delayed the sale of WRNI and WXNI, citing concerns raised by both Lynch and Rhode Island Governor Don Carcieri. Memos obtained by The Boston Globe revealed that WBUR felt the Rhode Island stations were money bleeders, and had decided to either lease or sell the stations at the earliest opportunity. The furor over the WRNI sale was one factor in Christo's resignation almost a month later.

In June 2005, BU took WRNI and WXNI off the market. It promised to hire a full-time general manager based in Providence, and also stepped up local news coverage. As a result, Lynch closed his investigation in November 2006.

On March 21, 2007, WBUR announced that it was selling WRNI to Rhode Island Public Radio (RIPR)—formerly the Foundation for Ocean State Public Radio—for $2 million. Rhode Island Public Radio also announced it was buying WAKX in Narragansett Pier from Davidson Media to serve as a repeater for WRNI in southern Rhode Island. WAKX, which signed on in 1989, had been a smooth jazz station. As part of the sale agreement, BU would continue to provide engineering and programming assistance to RIPR for five years.

RIPR officially took control of WAKX on May 17, 2007, changing the call sign to WRNI-FM. The addition of WRNI-FM made WXNI redundant, and BU sold that station separately to Diponti Communications, which renamed it WBLQ. RIPR took control of WRNI on September 1, 2008. RIPR registered the domain name ripr.org on February 13, 2007; the site was live as of June 2007.

=== As a Spanish-language public radio station ===
On October 8, 2011, RIPR dropped its English-language public radio programming from the 1290 AM signal and brokered its airtime to Latino Public Radio (LPR). The move also made LPR eligible for Corporation for Public Broadcasting funding.

LPR's programming had previously been heard part-time on The Wheeler School's WELH (88.1 FM); that station replaced WRNI as flagship of the Rhode Island Public Radio network, which as of 2018 also included WNPN (89.3 FM) in Newport, WNPE (102.7) in Narragansett Pier, and WCVY (91.5 FM) in Coventry.

With the end of LPR's five-year lease approaching in October 2016, RIPR elected to sell WRNI and, as part of the lease, gave LPR right of first refusal. RIPR entered into an agreement to sell the station to LPR for $400,000 on August 11, 2017, with LPR being required to change the station's call letters; LPR requested the call sign WRPA. On February 15, 2018, a notice of non-consummation was filed and the sale to LPR nullified, however the FCC granted the call letter change to WRPA on February 28. On March 23, it was announced Latino Public Radio had requested termination of the lease, effective March 31, 2018.

=== Post-Latino Public Radio ===
At 12:04 a.m., April 1, 2018, WRPA shut down and Latino Public Radio programming ended. At 9:30 a.m. on April 10, 2018, WRPA resumed broadcasting using a simulcast of WNPN. The license was still owned by Rhode Island Public Radio.

After WNET purchased WPPB in Southampton, New York, in March 2020 and renamed it WLIW-FM, Rhode Island Public Radio applied for the callsign WPPB on July 10, 2020. However, after WPVD (1450 AM) was purchased by DiPonti Communications in September 2020 and became WWRI, the call sign WPVD became available. With "WPVD" having greater relevance to "Providence", WPPB changed to WPVD on November 11, 2020.

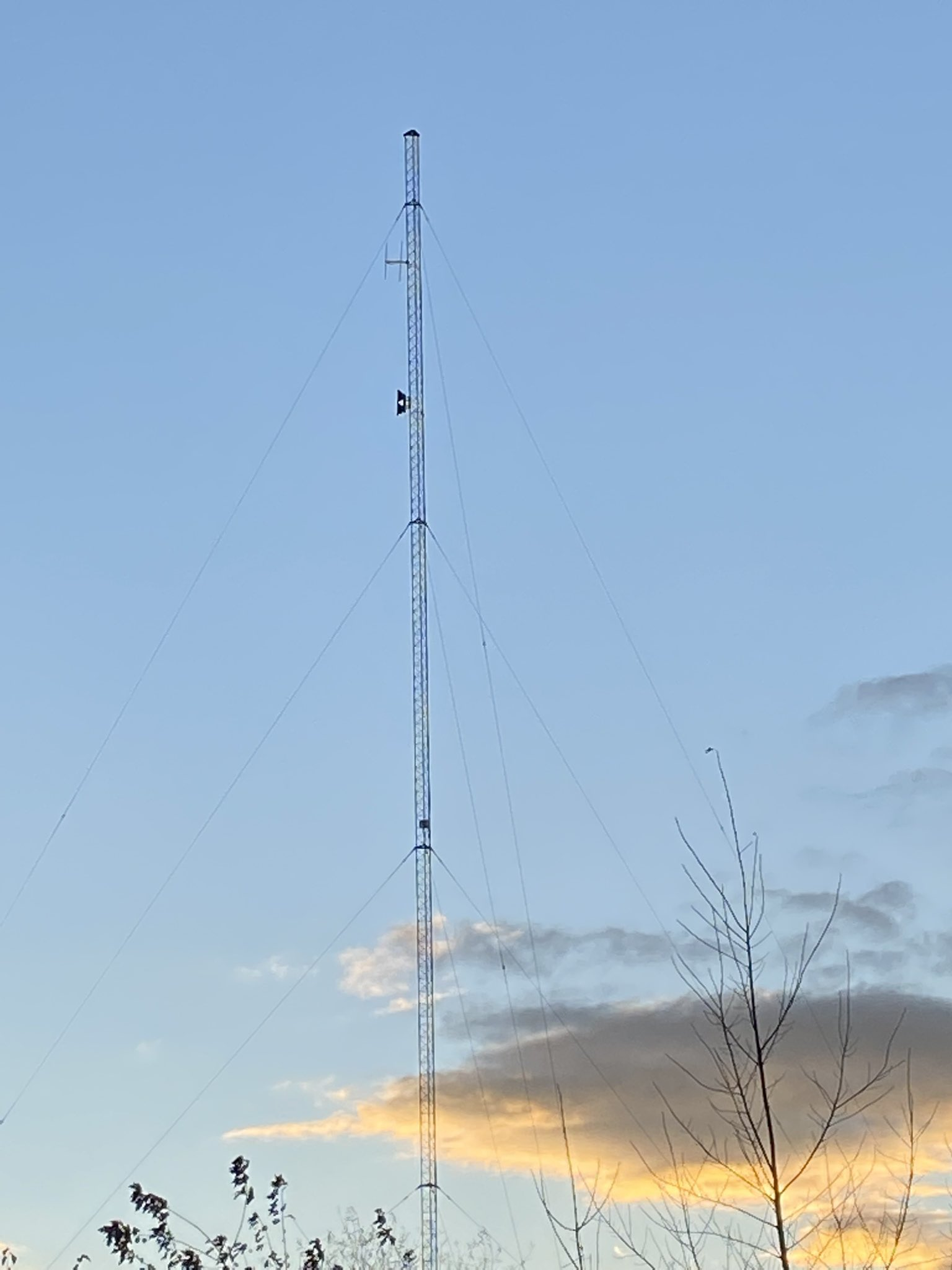
The WPVD broadcast tower in North Providence.

In late 2021, WPVD sought and received a construction permit to reduce its power to 400 watts daytime, and 16 watts nighttime, using only one tower from the original four-tower array. In the process, this also would change the license from a Class B station to Class D. The license to cover was granted September 19, 2022, after the three unused towers were demolished.

On November 9, 2023, RIPR announced its intention to merge with WPVD-TV, Rhode Island's PBS station; the merger was approved in 2024, and the combined organization became Ocean State Media in 2025. Ocean State Media consolidated its radio service on a single statewide signal, the newly-acquired WPVD-FM 103.7, on May 1, 2026. Following a transition period, the original five-station radio network, including WPVD AM, was taken silent in July 2026; the licenses will be sold.

== Translator ==
Call sign	Frequency	City of license	FID	ERP (W)	Class	Transmitter coordinates	FCC info
W275DA	102.9 FM	Providence, Rhode Island	202495	50	D	41°48′17″N 71°28′22″W	LMS
