= WRJI =

Radio station in East Greenwich, Rhode Island, USA

- East Greenwich, Rhode Island; United States
- Frequency: 91.5 MHz
- Branding: Jesus in the Middle of Rhode Island

Programming
- Language: Spanish

Ownership
- Owner: Educational Radio For the Public of the New Millennium

History
- First air date: January 2007
- Last air date: November 2, 2009
- Call sign meaning: Jesus in the Middle of R.I. (hence why the J was in between R & I in WRJI)

Technical information
- Facility ID: 93884
- Class: A
- ERP: 55 watts
- HAAT: 73 meters/240 feet
- Transmitter coordinates: 41°39′17″N 71°29′55.6″W

WRJI (91.5 FM) was a radio station licensed to serve East Greenwich, Rhode Island. The station was owned by Educational Radio For the Public of the New Millennium. It aired Spanish religious programming during hours that WCVY was not broadcasting (14:00-22:00 weekdays during the school year except holidays and vacation).

The station had been assigned the WRJI callsign by the Federal Communications Commission from January 18, 2006 to January 19, 2011.

== License deleted ==
WRJI had not operated from November 2, 2009, to November 25, 2010, nor it asked the FCC for a silent authorization in that time. WRJI's license was deleted on January 19, 2011. Station president Carlos Vasquez filed a packet with the F.C.C. in March 2011 stating there were people acting against the station and to relicense the station. The F.C.C. declined, noting the over-1-year-long outage mandated the station's license be revoked. Also, the station's application to move its community of license from East Greenwich to Providence was denied, citing overlap with WDOM/91.3. Additionally, moving WRJI's community of license from East Greenwich to Providence would remove East Greenwich's only "local service."

== Subsequent operations ==
On the Radio Info message board, it was reported on February 14, 2011, that the former operators of WRJI had resumed broadcasting on 91.5 MHz after their license was canceled. Instead of transmitting from the old East Greenwich site however, they were transmitting from Providence.
