= WELH =

High school radio station at The Wheeler School

Coordinates: 41.858°N 71.318°W

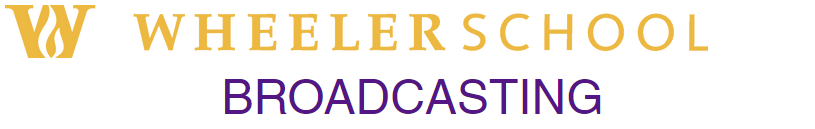

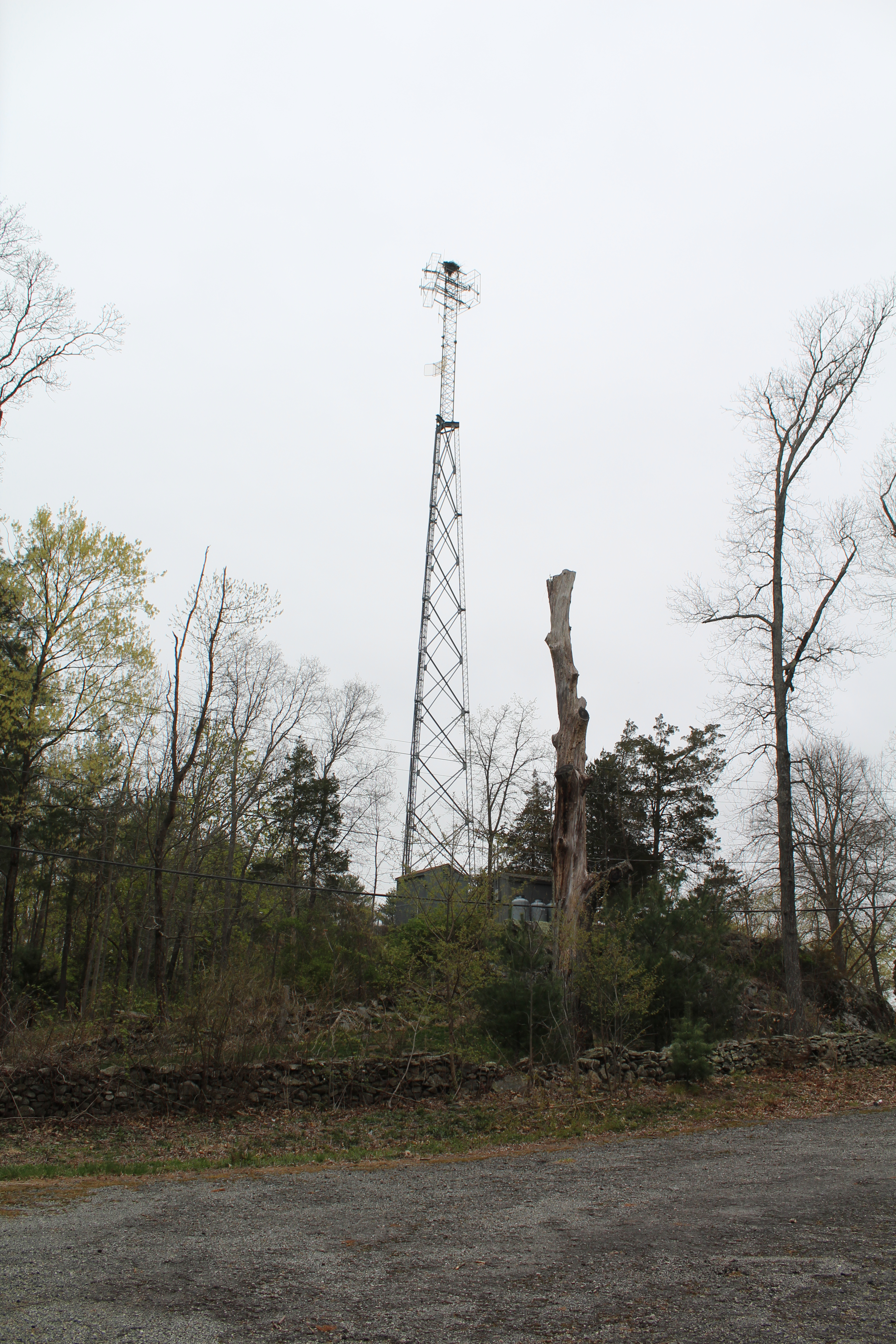
- The WELH transmitter in Seekonk, Massachusetts
- Providence, Rhode Island; United States
- Broadcast area: Providence metropolitan area
- Frequency: 88.1 MHz
- Branding: Wheeler School Broadcasting

Programming
- Format: Classic alternative

Ownership
- Owner: The Wheeler School

History
- First air date: January 17, 1995
- Former call signs: WUFG (1992–1993)
- Call sign meaning: "Wheeler"

Technical information
- Licensing authority: FCC
- Facility ID: 66656
- Class: A
- ERP: 4,000 watts
- HAAT: 41 meters (135 ft)

Links
- Public license information: Public file; LMS
- Website: www.wheelerschoolbroadcasting.org

WELH (88.1 FM) is a radio station owned by The Wheeler School of Providence, Rhode Island. Originally signing on in January 1995 with a pop alternative format and a line up of student DJs, WWKX veterans including Kickin Al Snape, a young Robby Bridges and others as "WELH: Taking Music to New Heights". In 1996 the station moved to a modern rock format programmed by student DJs as "Extreme 88", and later jazz and oldies, eventually offering programming from various groups (including Brown University, Rhode Island College, the Wheeler School itself, and community groups). From October 8, 2011 until September 30, 2021, WELH broadcast programming from Rhode Island Public Radio. Beginning in October 2021, the station has broadcast a primarily classic alternative format supplemented by radio shows from Wheeler School students on weeknights and electronic dance music during portions of the weekend.

Its main studio is located on school grounds, at 216 Hope St. in Providence, however the transmitter is located in Seekonk, Massachusetts on the grounds of the "Wheeler Farm" (athletics complex).

== Former programming ==
=== Brown Student & Community Radio ===
Brown Student and Community Radio (BSR) is a freeform, student- and community-radio station in Providence, Rhode Island which had broadcast on WELH and streaming. It grew out of "WBRU-AM" (a carrier current station on the Brown University campus) in 1997 as a noncommercial and educational alternative to WBRU's primary commercially operated station for students at Brown University, and in 2003 it became a joint student-community radio station. In 2008, mtvU nominated BSR as one of the top radio stations in the country. BSR's involvement with WELH was discontinued on July 31, 2011, as part of its transition to being the flagship of Rhode Island Public Radio; its programming continues as an Internet radio station. In conjunction with other community organizations, BSR acquired a low-power FM license in 2018 and now operates on WBRU-LP 101.1 FM in Providence.

=== Rhode Island College Radio ===
Rhode Island College Radio, "WXIN" was an original partner of WELH, formerly sending a signal from the college's studios to WELH on weekday nights and weekends. Much of WELH's broadcast studio was purchased by "WXIN" as part of a mutual broadcast agreement. Only veteran "WXIN" DJs were permitted to have a show on WELH. The agreement began shortly after WELH beat "WXIN" in the acquisition of a broadcast license (both had applied for the license from the FCC to broadcast on 88.1 in the late 1980s). In the late 1990s, "WXIN" members shared airtime with WELH on Tuesday, Thursday, and Sundays, and by the early 2000s "WXIN" only broadcast on the weekends (and occasionally weekdays during the summer).

Over time, Brown University's student radio bought out WXIN's airtime, limiting Rhode Island College's use of the station to Sundays. By 2007, Brown bought the remainder of the airtime, effectively removing WXIN's involvement from WELH. This air time was later filled by a Latino block until Noon and an Italian block from Noon-9 p.m.

=== Latino Public Radio ===
WELH was the original home for Latino Public Radio, a Spanish-language public radio service, airing its programming from 3 a.m.–3 p.m. on weekdays and from 3 a.m.–noon on weekends. When the station became the flagship station of Rhode Island Public Radio, LPR's programming moved to a 24-hour clearance on WRNI (1290 AM), RIPR's original Providence station; this move allowed LPR to qualify for Corporation for Public Broadcasting funding.

=== Rhode Island Public Radio/The Public's Radio 89.3FM ===
In 2011 Rhode Island Public Radio signed a ten-year lease, beginning in October, for nearly all of the broadcast week on 88.1FM (student programming was aired for three hours Friday night, later moved to Sunday evenings). Thus WELH became the first-ever FM outlet for a local NPR news/talk format for Rhode Island. Later, in 2017, WELH lost its flagship status when RIPR bought WUMD in North Dartmouth, Massachusetts from the University of Massachusetts at Dartmouth and moved it to WLNE-TV's former tower in Tiverton as WNPN. However, WELH was still used to improve WNPN's coverage in the Providence area. In 2021 RIPR brought W275DA 102.9FM on the air in Providence, and the need for WELH in the network significantly lessened. RIPR decided not to renew the lease and WELH decided it would return to all-Wheeler School student programming. The changeover happened on September 30, 2021.

== Current programming ==
=== Cutting Edge Classics ===
With the expiration of the Rhode Island Public Radio lease, WELH switched to a new "Cutting Edge Classics" format on October 1, 2021. Writing in Providence Monthly, reporter Adam Hogue said of the station's format change, "The stars aligned to bring us WELH, a station that came seemingly out of nowhere to fill the alt-rock hole left when Brown University sold WBRU in 2017." The "Cutting Edge Classics" format was conceived by David A. Schiano, the program director and director of operations for WELH, and primarily follows a classic alternative format. Wheeler School student programming is broadcast at 7:00 on weeknights, and includes student shows on topics such as music, sports, and films. "Beats After Dark" is broadcast on Friday and Saturday nights and features a variety of electronic dance music. The station is non-commercial, with the only advertising being public service announcements from the Ad Council.

== Power increase ==
In early 2009, WLNE-TV (channel 6) permanently moved to UHF channel 49 for digital broadcasts. The move removed a roadblock for increasing the power of WELH on the 88.1 frequency. As a result, WELH increased from 150 watts to 4,000 watts. The upgraded power doubled the coverage area and improved reception in metropolitan Providence.
