= WPVD-TV =

Television station in Providence, Rhode Island

- Providence, Rhode Island; United States
- Channels: Digital: 2 (VHF), shared with WRIW-CD; Virtual: 36
- Branding: Ocean State Media

Programming
- Affiliations: 36.1: PBS

Ownership
- Owner: Ocean State Media; (Ocean State Media Group)
- Sister stations: WNPE; WNPH; WNPN; WPVD; WPVD-FM

History
- First air date: June 5, 1967
- Former call signs: WSBE-TV (1967–2026)
- Former channel numbers: Analog: 36 (UHF, 1967–2009); Digital: 21 (UHF, 2005–2019)
- Former affiliations: NET (1967–1970)
- Call sign meaning: Taken from WPVD radio, Providence

Technical information
- Licensing authority: FCC
- Facility ID: 56092
- ERP: 13.6 kW
- HAAT: 273.4 m (897 ft)
- Transmitter coordinates: 41°51′55.4″N 71°17′12.7″W

Links
- Public license information: Public file; LMS
- Website: www.oceanstatemedia.org

WPVD-TV (channel 36) is a PBS member television station in Providence, Rhode Island, United States, serving the entire state as well as Southeastern Massachusetts. It is the television outlet of Ocean State Media, Rhode Island's community-owned public broadcaster, which also owns WPVD-FM (103.7). The stations share studios on Park Lane in Providence; WPVD-TV's transmitter is located on Pine Street in Rehoboth, Massachusetts.

Plans for construction of an educational television station in Rhode Island dated to 1953, when the State Board of Education made an application for the channel. However, the state government did not provide the necessary funding until 1966, clearing the way for WSBE-TV to begin broadcasting on June 5, 1967. Broadcasting from a studio at Rhode Island College, it aired daytime programs for schools and evening programs from National Educational Television. The station was strapped for financial resources for most of its early history and suffered from its governance by the board of education and, later, the board of regents. In addition, WSBE-TV struggled to compete with the presence of Boston's WGBH-TV in much of Rhode Island through its broadcast signal and cable television. In 1974, it moved to the former studios of WPRI-TV on Mason Street. Under general manager Warren Kraetzer, the station began on-air fundraising but failed to replace its aging transmitter and other obsolete equipment. In 1981, the Board of Regents was split up, and the Rhode Island Public Telecommunications Authority was created to oversee WSBE-TV.

Susan Farmer became WSBE-TV's general manager in 1987 and helped the station fend off attempts by the state government to cut funding by expanding community and corporate fundraising. The station moved into its present studios in 1991, the previous site having been acquired to build the Rhode Island Convention Center, and became known as Rhode Island PBS in 2003. In 2012, it was spun out to a community licensee, which merged with Rhode Island Public Radio in 2024 to form Ocean State Media. The station, renamed WPVD-TV in 2026, produces local programming on Rhode Island issues and culture.

== History ==
=== Construction and early years ===
In 1952, the Federal Communications Commission (FCC) ended its years-long freeze on new television stations. It allocated Providence, Rhode Island, channel 22 for use by an educational television station. The Rhode Island State Department of Education and various higher education institutions—including Brown University, Providence College, the University of Rhode Island, Rhode Island College of Education, and the Providence public school system—set up a Television Advisory Committee to plan a station to use the reserved channel. In March 1953, Rhode Island governor Dennis J. Roberts announced that the state would apply for channel 22—even though it did not have the funding to build and operate it. On June 1, 1953, the FCC received the channel 22 application, which proposed a studio at the Providence Public Library and a transmitter on Neutaconkanut Hill. Backers were hopeful to be on the air in late 1954 if the Rhode Island General Assembly allocated funds.

After the Rhode Island General Assembly refused to provide funding to set up channel 22, the State Board of Education recommended that a community board be formed to file for the station and announced in June 1954 it would withdraw its application, though it never did so. At the end of that year, commercial station WWLP in Springfield, Massachusetts, applied to the FCC seeking to move down from channel 61 to the lower channel 22, which would provide better coverage. Its petition suggested that Rhode Island be assigned channel 36 for educational broadcasting instead of 22. The commission granted WWLP's request effective June 2, 1955, moving the unbuilt Rhode Island permit to channel 22 and changing several ultra high frequency (UHF) allocations in Massachusetts. Meanwhile, backers of educational television struggled to get the state to allocate funds. In 1955, the state allocated $150,000 for the channel, but this was insufficient to cover construction and operation costs, and it reverted back to the state general fund after the 1957–58 fiscal year. Additionally, it was believed that a UHF television station would be ineffective to meet the educational needs of the state.

On June 14, 1960, the State Board of Education directed staff to draft plans to build channel 36. In spite of the order, the board still eyed a more desirable very high frequency (VHF) station if possible. In September 1960, it petitioned for the FCC—then considering reassigning VHF channel 6 to Providence from New Bedford, Massachusetts—to reserve the channel for education use. Though optimism about solutions to the financing and UHF issues, as well as the offer of tower space from commercial TV station WPRO-TV and construction of a new studio at Rhode Island College, prompted increased interest in activating channel 36 by 1963, the funding never came. Because the funds were not allocated, the FCC did not grant the construction permit. A December 1964 article in The Providence Journal was titled "Little Hope Now For Channel 36".

In 1966, governor John Chafee, for the first time in 12 years, sent the General Assembly a budget containing the full request from the State Board of Education for funding to build a TV station. The funding was passed, and work began in earnest to put a television station together. On March 28, 1967, the U.S. Office of Education awarded $199,655 to the State Board of Education to put channel 36 on the air. The construction permit was granted by the FCC on March 31, and WSBE-TV, named for the State Board of Education, began broadcasting on June 5, 1967, with the first program being the elementary school series Tell Me a Story. It initially broadcast five hours of daytime programs for schools and an evening schedule of programs for adults. The station operated through the end of June and then shut down for the summer, reopening on September 11 with a formal ceremony presided over by Chafee. It broadcast for 35 hours a week, between programs for schools and evening programming from National Educational Television (NET). Initially, uptake by local schools was slowed because the station had come together so quickly that school boards had little time to allocate money to buy UHF-capable television sets that could tune channel 36. In 1970, NET was supplanted by PBS as the network for public broadcasting.

A private consultant recommended in 1969 that the station acquire a mobile unit for outside broadcasting; pursue funds to be connected by microwave with WGBH-TV in Boston, which supplied many of the programs used on the station; move out of the studios it was occupying at Rhode Island College by the early 1970s; and activate a noncommercial educational radio station. The next year, the State Board of Education was dissolved and replaced by a Board of Regents overseeing all public education in Rhode Island, which became the new licensee. It took months for the new Board of Regents to set a course for the station; it was told by a member of the Corporation for Public Broadcasting (CPB) in January 1971 that Rhode Island was a national laggard in public broadcasting. While the station acquired the mobile unit, it was not appropriated state funds for staffing, leading to it going unused. To improve reception in southwestern Rhode Island, where the WSBE-TV signal was poor due to hilly terrain, the station received a federal grant to construct a translator in Westerly. It also received funds to build the microwave link to Boston.

Limited staff and facilities constrained WSBE-TV in its early years. Beginning in 1970, channel 36 produced multiple foreign-language programs to cater to Rhode Island's ethnic communities, but when these were cut back due to inadequate time in the studio and a lack of staff, the producer resigned, resulting in one staffer on the Portuguese-language show to charge a "conspiracy" by management to force him out. The station produced telecasts of the General Assembly but lacked the resources to showcase the Trinity Square Repertory Company or Rhode Island Philharmonic Orchestra regularly. At one point, the chair of the station's advisory council telegraphed the regents, "Channel 36 urgently need space and facilities. Please advise if move possible this September." With the existing studios at Rhode Island College inadequate and too small for the station's needs, the Board of Regents pursued leasing of studios to be vacated by WPRI-TV. In 1974, an hour-long forum asking for viewer opinions on the station's operation only drew two callers. The Board of Regents proposed turning over the station to an educational institution; the University of Rhode Island made a proposal that included starting fundraising activities, improving reception in non-metropolitan Rhode Island, and charging schools a fee to utilize classroom programming, but the university withdrew its plan after what state education commissioner Thomas C. Schmidt called "extraordinary distrust" of URI's ability to include public viewpoints in its proposed operation.

=== The Kraetzer years ===
Days after URI withdrew its proposal, a group of 40 supporters known as the "People's Congress" met to chart a new course for WSBE-TV. They suggested adding more local programming, including a daily news program, and discussed the challenges of operating in the shadow of Boston's WGBH-TV, which had more fundraisers in Rhode Island than Rhode Island's own TV station. The state began a national search for a "creative person" to serve as general manager and hired Warren A. Kraetzer, formerly of the Philadelphia area's WHYY-TV. Under Kraetzer, the station initiated public fundraising activities and prioritized replacing its signal, which he called "dreadfully underpowered". More people took notice of the station, even without a better signal, resulting in a viewership growth rate that was the highest in New England. In November 1978, WSBE-TV won a federal grant to finance new transmission equipment. However, the station was unable to find state support to match the grant after more than two years, including a 1980 referendum for funds that was rejected by voters, and the transmitter itself had become more expensive due to inflation.

In 1981, Rhode Island legislators split the Board of Regents into three new boards: one for public higher education, one for school districts, and one for public media, the Public Telecommunications Authority. After strained relations with the board and a state audit that found the station lost money because it failed to take advantage of discounts offered by PBS, Kraetzer resigned in 1984. Though one knowledgeable observer credited him with increasing public support, the observer also noted that corporate fundraising had underperformed. By this time, the station was in dire need of investment, with out-of-date equipment, a staff that had dwindled to 30 people, and competition from WGBH-TV, which had higher viewership among Rhode Island households. It only had two-inch video tape machines at a time when most programs were coming on industry-standard one-inch tape. In 1986, governor Edward D. DiPrete cut the station's state funding by a third as a way to make the station reliant on community support. At one point, WGBH proposed merging with WSBE-TV. A call for bids resulted in multiple proposals for outside groups to run the station, including from WGBH; the Rhode Island chapter of the National Education Association; a nonprofit in Taunton, Massachusetts; two community foundations; and WSBE-TV's own management, which planned to lay off all but 10 employees and curtail broadcasting to five hours a day on weekdays. Three proposals remained under consideration through December 1986, when the Rhode Island Public Telecommunications Authority rejected them and decided to keep operating WSBE-TV.

=== The Farmer years ===
In January 1987, the Telecommunications Authority voted to install Susan Farmer, a former Rhode Island secretary of state, as the station's new manager. Farmer, who had been a candidate for lieutenant governor as a Republican, was perceived as a political appointment; the chair of the search committee had been told by DiPrete that Farmer's appointment would come with a promise of state financing. Farmer used her experience in political fundraising to generate corporate support. She enticed an underwriter to support The MacNeil/Lehrer NewsHour, which WSBE-TV had dropped from its schedule after the cuts the year before. The Channel 36 Foundation was created that year, helping reduce the station's reliance on state funding.

At the same time that Farmer was settling in, consultants eyeing the construction of a convention center in downtown Providence suggested absorbing the WSBE-TV studio site into the footprint. Farmer eyed the opportunity to replace the antiquated equipment, which Farmer mused had been frozen in time when it was used by WPRI. In 1988, the station selected a site in the Huntington Industrial Park, along Route 10 near Providence's border with Cranston. However, the station was unable to move in time to permit a demolition and immediate move into the new permanent studio facility. As a result, WSBE-TV relocated in October 1990 to temporary studios in the same industrial park so that crews building the Rhode Island Convention Center could raze the old studio. The move to the Park Lane studio was completed in April 1991.

Farmer's early years on the job were characterized by skepticism over politicization of her leadership. In 1989, Farmer replaced the host of WSBE-TV's public affairs program, The Thirteenth State. This resulted in 59 members of the Rhode Island House, led by Frank J. Fiorenzano, introducing a resolution calling for its host to be reinstated. In response, the station adopted an editorial integrity policy. Farmer fought for the station as state leaders took aim at its budget. In 1991, new governor Bruce Sundlun announced his intention to cut all state funding for WSBE-TV. Farmer at one point confronted Sundlun inside a sandwich shop, with reporters present, and advocated for the station, which received a continued appropriation. Another set of budget cuts in 1993 led to a reduction in half of PBS programs, with the NewsHour, Masterpiece Theatre, Nova and other PBS staples removed from channel 36's lineup and a new schedule instituted to reduce overlap with WGBH-TV. By this time, cable television penetration in Rhode Island was high enough that most viewers in the state either could receive WGBH by antenna or on cable. Also cut was half of WSBE-TV's programs for schools. Farmer's ability to obtain external support for WSBE was seen as helping encourage the state to reduce its own support.

In 2003, WSBE-TV rebranded as Rhode Island PBS, reflecting its varying channel numbers on local cable systems, and launched a series of new local programs. The Channel 36 Foundation simultaneously became the Rhode Island PBS Foundation. Over time, Farmer became a respected leader in the public television space and served on various industry boards. She was diagnosed with cancer in 2001 and retired in 2004.

=== Digital conversion and addition of public-access responsibilities ===
WSBE-TV did not have a full-time president and general manager after Farmer's resignation until Robert E. Fish, former owner of WHJJ and WHJY radio stations in Providence, assumed the post on January 1, 2006. During his tenure, WSBE-TV completed its transition to digital television. Under Farmer, WSBE-TV reached a deal with NBC to use the tower of WJAR-TV (channel 10), paying to strengthen the mast to accommodate a digital facility. On January 15, 2009, the analog transmitter on Neutaconkanut Hill—reputedly the last to be manufactured by RCA Corporation—failed, and the cost of restoration was prohibitive with the scheduled digital television conversion a month away. (Note: The station's digital signal remained on its pre-transition UHF channel 21, using virtual channel 36.) Fish died in 2010; acting president and chief financial officer David Piccerelli was named to the post after Fish's death.

During the Fish era, new cable television regulations in Rhode Island vested in WSBE-TV the responsibility for public-access television channels throughout the state. The provision of public-access studios had previously belonged to Cox Communications, the state's near-monopoly cable television provider, until Verizon FiOS entered the market. In order to avoid construction of seven redundant studios, Rhode Island PBS took on the responsibility for the access channels and the 17 employees Cox used to provide this service. This included the local channels and three "statewide interconnect" channels available throughout the state.

=== Community ownership and merger with Rhode Island Public Radio ===
On June 25, 2012, the Rhode Island Public Telecommunications Authority voted unanimously to transfer WSBE-TV's license to the Rhode Island PBS Foundation as part of a spin-out of the station from the state. The move was spurred when Lincoln Chafee was elected governor and then proposed to cancel funding for Rhode Island PBS. As part of the spin-out, WSBE negotiated three years to wean itself off state support. The move provided flexibility in programming decisions as well as pensions and benefits for employees.

In 2017, WSBE-TV agreed to move to a low-VHF channel in the FCC's incentive auction and received a $94.4 million payment. Even though low-VHF channels are less desirable for the transmission of digital reception, at the time 94 percent of Rhode Island PBS viewers watched the station by cable or satellite, part of the reason for the decision.

On November 9, 2023, Rhode Island PBS and Rhode Island Public Radio, operator of the radio network then known as The Public's Radio, announced their intent to merge; the merger was completed in May 2024, with Pam Johnston, former general manager of news for WGBH, named to lead the combined organization. In October 2025, WSBE and The Public's Radio rebranded as Ocean State Media. The organization was able to avoid required layoffs after the rescission by Congress of federal funding for public broadcasting in 2025 as enough employees took voluntary buyouts.

On June 17, 2026, WSBE-TV filed to change its call sign to WPVD-TV, which took effect on July 1.

== Local programming ==
In 1987, WSBE-TV launched A Lively Experiment (now known as Lively), a weekly public affairs series. Since 2016, it has been hosted by Jim Hummel, a former reporter for WLNE-TV and The Providence Journal.

== Subchannels ==
WPVD-TV transmits from a site on Pine Street in Rehoboth, Massachusetts. In 2021, it entered into an agreement to share capacity on its transmitter with WRIW-CD (channel 51), which under the agreement has the right to offer one to three standard-definition channels on the multiplex. The station's signal is multiplexed:

Subchannels of WPVD-TV and WRIW-CD
License	Subchannel	Res.	Short name	Programming
WPVD-TV	36.1	1080i	WSBE-HD	PBS
WPVD-TV	36.2	480i	WSBE-D2	[Blank] (4:3)
WRIW-CD	51.1	480i	WRIW-CD	Telemundo (WYCN-LD) in SD
WRIW-CD	51.2	480i	COZI	Cozi TV
WRIW-CD	51.3	480i	OXYGEN	Oxygen

Simulcast of subchannels of another station
