= Ocean State Media =

Public radio network serving Rhode Island

- Rhode Island; United States
- Broadcast area: Rhode Island; Southeastern Massachusetts
- Frequencies: WPVD-FM 103.7 Westerly; WNPN 89.3 FM Newport; WNPE 102.7 FM Narragansett Pier; W275DA 102.9 FM Providence; WPVD 1290 AM Providence; WNPW 89.5 FM Westerly; WNPH 90.7 FM Portsmouth

Programming
- Format: Public radio; news-talk
- Affiliations: NPR; PRX; APM; BBCWS

Ownership
- Owner: Ocean State Media Group
- Sister stations: WPVD-TV

History
- First air date: May 1, 1998

Links
- Webcast: Listen live
- Website: www.oceanstatemedia.org

Ocean State Media Group, doing business as Ocean State Media (OSM), is an American public broadcasting organization serving Rhode Island and parts of Southeastern Massachusetts. It operates the NPR and PBS member stations for the region, WPVD-FM in Westerly and WPVD-TV in Providence. Its studios and offices are located on Park Lane in Providence.

The organization was formed in 2007 as Rhode Island Public Radio (RIPR), which originally acquired WPVD AM (then WRNI) from Boston University to give it independence from WBUR after several years of financial uncertainties; WRNI had been Rhode Island's NPR station since 1998. In 2011, RIPR began to acquire additional FM stations to expand its coverage across Rhode Island and surrounding regions. In 2018, the network rebranded as The Public's Radio (TPR) to reflect the expansion of its coverage into Southeastern Massachusetts.

In 2023, RIPR announced its intent to merge with Rhode Island's PBS member station WSBE-TV, which went on the air in 1967; the merger was completed in 2024. In October 2025, the two networks rebranded as Ocean State Media. In 2026, WPVD-FM was acquired to replace its previous five-station radio network, and WSBE-TV was renamed WPVD-TV.

== History ==
=== Boston University ===
In the 1990s, a group of Rhode Islanders formed the "Foundation for Ocean State Public Radio" to bring a local public radio station to the state. Clare Gregorian was described as the "driving force" behind the idea. At the time, Rhode Island was the only state in New England (traditionally one of the bedrocks of support for NPR) and one of only two in the entire country (the other being Delaware) that did not have a full-service NPR station within its borders. Most of the state got at least a grade B signal from Boston's public radio stations, WGBH and WBUR; Providence is within WGBH's city-grade signal. However, both stations focus primarily on Boston and its suburbs.

After a few years of looking, they found a partner in Boston University, owner of WBUR. BU agreed to buy WRCP (1290 AM), a 5,000-watt station that had been on the air since 1947. The price tag was $1.9 million. The foundation conducted a statewide drive to help raise the funds. For many years, 1290 AM had been known as WICE, but switched to Portuguese language programming as WRCP in 1983.

=== WRNI and WXNI ===
On May 1, 1998, WRCP's call sign changed to WRNI, and the license was officially transferred. The new owner was the WRNI Foundation, a separate fundraising group set up by WBUR to handle local underwriting.

Even though BU doubled WRNI's transmission power to 10,000 watts, its signal was not strong enough to reach the southern and western portion of the state. Accordingly, in 1999, BU bought WERI (1230 AM) in Westerly, which had been on the air since 1949. BU changed WERI's call letters to WXNI, and made it a full-time satellite of WRNI. The station brought a city-grade NPR signal to southern Rhode Island for the first time.

BU and WBUR had big plans for WRNI at first. It moved WRNI from its longtime studio on Douglas Avenue to a state-of-the-art facility at Union Station. It also started a daily two-hour local news magazine, One Union Station. There were plans to set up a third station to fill the gaps in WXNI's 1,000-watt signal.

However, budget problems brought on by the September 11, 2001 attacks forced One Union Station's cancellation. It was replaced with a one-hour news magazine but that was also canceled in 2004. At that point, WRNI's local operations were significantly cut back, with most of the station's staff either laid off or transferred to Boston. As a result, WRNI's schedule became almost identical to that of WBUR.

=== Controversy over sale of 1290 AM ===
On September 17, 2004, with no advance warning, WBUR Group general manager Jane Christo announced that WRNI and WXNI were being put up for sale. She would not give any specifics, only saying that it was time for Rhode Islanders to buy the stations if they wanted to keep NPR programming in the state. WBUR claimed that it never planned to operate WRNI on a long-term basis, and had only intended to help develop it into a self-sustaining service.

The reaction in Rhode Island was negative. In an editorial, The Providence Journal said that WBUR had made numerous long-term commitments to WRNI. The Journal claimed that if the station's local backers had to buy WRNI, it would be tantamount to buying the station twice. The announcement led Rhode Island Attorney General Patrick Lynch to open an investigation into WBUR and WRNI.

On September 27, BU interim president Aram Chobanian delayed the sale of WRNI and WXNI, citing concerns raised by both Lynch and Rhode Island Governor Don Carcieri. Memos obtained by The Boston Globe revealed that WBUR felt the Rhode Island stations were money bleeders, and had decided to either lease or sell the stations at the earliest opportunity. The furor over the WRNI sale was one factor in Christo's resignation almost a month later.

In June 2005, BU took WRNI and WXNI off the market. It promised to hire a full-time general manager based in Providence, and also stepped-up local news coverage. As a result, Lynch closed his investigation in November 2006.

=== Independence from WBUR ===
On March 21, 2007, WBUR announced that it was selling WRNI to Rhode Island Public Radio (RIPR; formerly the Foundation for Ocean State Public Radio) for $2 million. Rhode Island Public Radio also announced it was buying WAKX (102.7 FM) in Narragansett Pier from the Davidson Media Group to serve as a repeater for WRNI in southern Rhode Island. WAKX, which signed on in 1989, had been a smooth jazz station. As part of the sale agreement, BU agreed to provide engineering and programming assistance to RIPR for five years.

RIPR officially took control of WAKX on May 17, 2007. The call sign was changed to WRNI-FM. The addition of WRNI-FM made WXNI redundant, and BU sold that station separately to Diponti Communications, which renamed it WBLQ. RIPR took control of WRNI on September 1, 2008.

=== Migration to FM, expansion of coverage ===
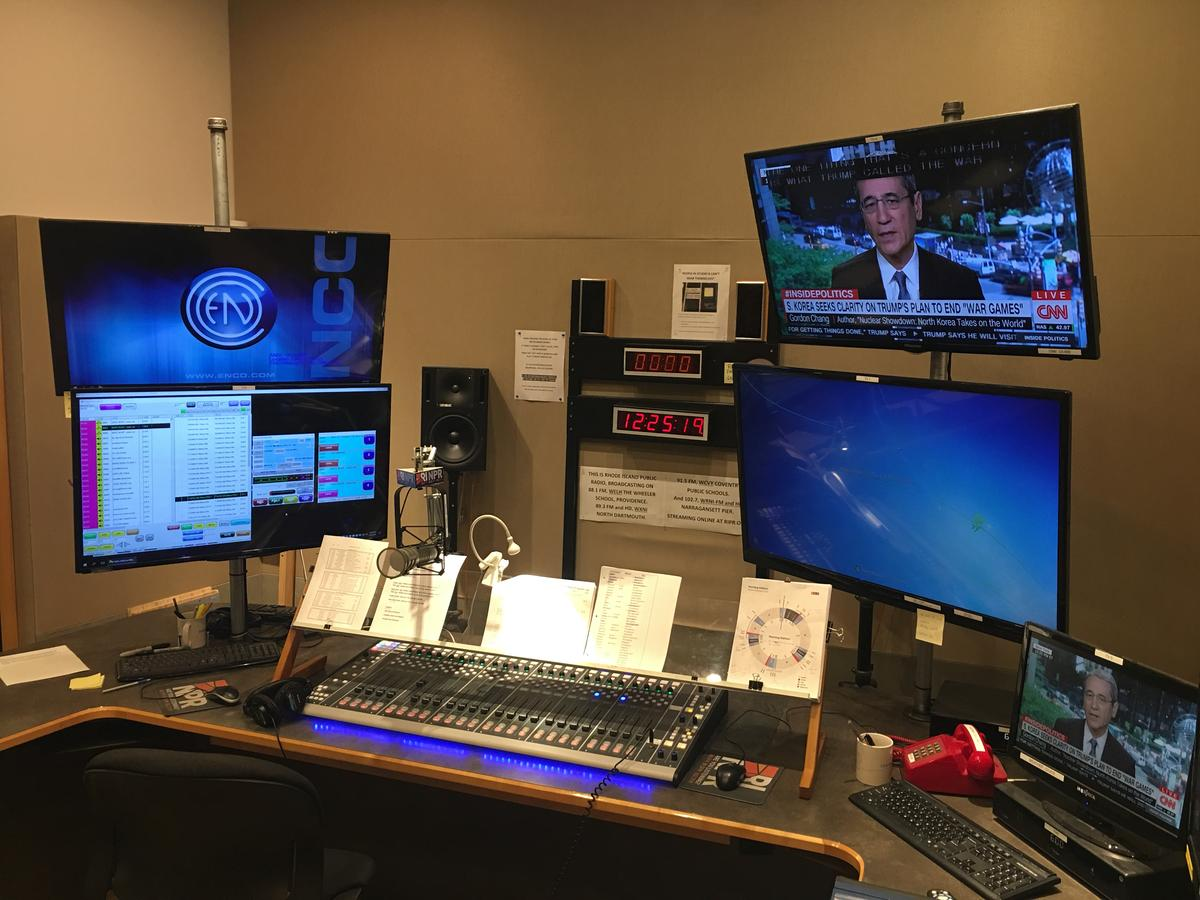
The Public's Radio Studio A, where local newscasts originate daily.

RIPR recognized the long-term challenges of public radio on the AM dial. There was a general expectation by listeners that public radio stations transmit on the noncommercial end of the FM band (88.1-91.9 MHz). In 2011 WRNI began to expand into a statewide network of FM signals. Accordingly, it also began branding itself exclusively as "Rhode Island Public Radio".

In July 2011, RIPR entered an agreement with WCVY (91.5 FM), which is owned and operated by Coventry High School and covers the Kent County region. Previously, because WCVY did not broadcast 24/7, they had been forced, under Federal Communications Commission (FCC) rule 73.561(b), to "share-time" 16 hours per day of the frequency with the now-defunct religious station WRJI. After WRJI lost its license, RIPR assisted WCVY in "reclaiming" the frequency for 24/7 operation. With the 2011 agreement, WCVY aired its own student-created programming on weekdays from 2-8 p.m. when school is in session, and The Public's Radio filled the remainder of the time to avoid another "share-time" challenge. The lease agreement ended in April 2021 and WCVY left the network.

In October 2011, RIPR signed a 10-year lease with The Wheeler School, a K-12 private day school and owner of WELH (88.1 FM). RIPR's content would be heard 24/7 on 88.1 in Providence except for a student-produced sports talk program midnight-3 Saturday mornings. The remainder of Wheeler's student media was migrated to internet radio and, more recently, to internet video projects. As part of this new lease, the previous lease tenants on 88.1, Brown Student Radio, and Latino Public Radio, each broadcasting a limited number of hours each day, were displaced:

- BSR began an internet radio station "BSRlive" and, in January 2015, was granted an FCC license for an LPFM station, WBRU-LP, on 101.1 FM in Providence, in conjunction with Providence Community Radio and AS220.
- Latino Public Radio signed a lease with RIPR to broadcast on RIPR's 1290 AM signal, WRNI, and moved to 1290 AM the same day RIPR moved to 88.1 FM. In addition to allowing LPR to broadcast 24/7, it also gave them a larger signal.

RIPR announced a deal in January 2017 with the University of Massachusetts, Dartmouth to purchase WUMD (89.3 FM). The deal included a move and expansion of the existing signal from the UMass Dartmouth campus to the former WLNE-TV tower in Tiverton. The station's FCC city of license was changed from North Dartmouth, Massachusetts, to Newport, Rhode Island. The new 89.3 was not quite a "statewide" signal; at 7,000 watts it operated at somewhat modest power on paper for a full NPR member on the FM band, like its predecessors. However, the former WLNE tower would provide a single frequency from which listeners in almost all towns along Narragansett Bay and the South Coast could hear RIPR's programming. On June 26, 2017, WUMD ended at noon and transitioned to an online-only station; the 89.3 signal went dark for two weeks to add new studio/transmitter link equipment. It returned to the airwaves at 10 p.m. on July 11, 2017, as WXNI, airing RIPR programming.

Construction quickly began to expand 89.3 by refurbishing the old WLNE tower, and a "license to cover" was applied for with the FCC on August 2, 2018 indicating imminent operation from the new facility. Three days earlier, WXNI changed its call letters to WNPN. On September 1, 2018, WNPN began transmitting full-time from the Tiverton facility. The move roughly doubled the coverage of the original facility, providing at least secondary coverage to all of Rhode Island. Notably, it added 700,000 new listeners in Rhode Island and the South Coast.

Former logo as The Public's Radio

The following month, Rhode Island Public Radio rebranded its network as The Public's Radio (TPR); CEO Torey Malatia explained that since they now served the South Coast as well as Rhode Island (the largest city in the network's coverage area was now New Bedford, Massachusetts), RIPR staff no longer believed it was accurate to brand the network as merely being a Rhode Island service. After originally considering a rebranding to "Southern New England Public Radio", Malatia and his colleagues decided it was best to choose an identity "based on what we do as opposed to our zip code".

After the Portsmouth Abbey School returned the license for WJHD (90.7 FM) to the FCC in September 2021, RIPR asked them to rescind the license deletion and purchased it on November 26, 2021, for $7500 plus technical assistance in their "podcast studio". The call letters were changed to WNPK and an application filed to move 90.7 off-campus to a tower in South Kingstown near the University of Rhode Island, greatly expanding the signal. The renamed WNPH operated at a low power while waiting for the FCC to approve its application to move to a new tower in and greatly expand the signal.

At the end of September 2021, repeater station W275DA began broadcasting on 102.9 FM in Providence from the WPRO-FM tower on Neutaconkanut Hill. Concordantly, RIPR elected not to renew the 10-year lease of WELH upon its expiration. On September 30, 2021, WELH reverted to Wheeler School-created programming full-time.

In December 2021, to avoid significant looming infrastructure repair costs and ongoing operating expenses, WPVD's signal was modified from 10,000 watts directional (using four towers) to 400 watts day and 16 watts night (using one tower).

=== Merger with Rhode Island PBS ===
On November 9, 2023, RIPR announced its intention to merge with WSBE-TV, Rhode Island's PBS station; the television station had been in operation since 1967. The merger was approved in April 2024 and finalized in June 2024. Subsequent to the merger, new CEO Pam Johnston was announced on July 16, 2024. The combined organization closed TPR's Union Station studios, with the radio network moving to the Rhode Island PBS facilities 4 miles (6.4 km) away.

In June 2025, it was announced that both Rhode Island PBS and The Public's Radio would rebrand under the new name Ocean State Media; the rebranding took effect on October 1.

On January 21, 2026, Ocean State Media announced that it would acquire WVEI-FM 103.7 from Audacy, Inc., for $4.9 million. The purchase would allow its radio service to be heard on a single station across most of Rhode Island, replacing the existing five-station network. Ocean State Media began broadcasting on the station, renamed WPVD-FM, on May 1, 2026; following a transition period, the previous five-station network was taken silent in July 2026 and put up for sale.

== Programming ==
=== Local news coverage ===
Ocean State Media has dedicated reporters covering specific beats, including Politics, Health Care, Education, the Environment, and Arts & Culture. OSM also produces local segments including:

- Political Roundtable with Ian Donnis every Friday morning.
- Weekly Catch a half-hour weekly roundup of the top stories, every Friday afternoon.
- Artscape, a weekly look at the arts & culture scene in Rhode Island.

In addition to the main studio in Providence, OSM also operates three local news bureaus:

- South Coast, with Ben Berke, based in downtown Fall River, covering the South Coast region.
- Newport, located at Washington Square in downtown Newport, covering Aquidneck Island and Jamestown.
- South County, with Alex Nunes, based in downtown Westerly, covering Washington County and Block Island.

Each bureau has a permanently-assigned, full-time bureau reporter, and a fully-soundproofed recording booth for interviews, live broadcasts, and similar projects.

OSM's television service airs a wildlife documentary series on Rhode Island and the surrounding area called Ocean State: Rhode Island's Wild Coast. It premiered in 2026 and is a limited series focusing on aquatic and oceanic wildlife of the region.

=== National shows ===
Ocean State Media carries several popular weekday public radio programs, including Morning Edition, All Things Considered, Fresh Air, Marketplace, Think, On Point and from the Canadian Broadcasting Corporation, Q. The BBC World Service runs overnight.

On weekends, OSM airs one-hour public radio shows on a variety of topics, including This American Life, Planet Money, Latino USA, The New Yorker Radio Hour, Radiolab, The Moth Radio Hour, Freakonomics Radio, Reveal, Science Friday, On The Media, Sound Opinions and Wait, Wait, Don't Tell Me. Weekend evenings feature music programs exploring jazz, blues and soul music.

== Broadcast stations ==
=== Radio ===
Ocean State Media's radio service is broadcast over WPVD-FM 103.7 in Westerly. WPVD-FM broadcasts from a tower in Exeter and covers most of Rhode Island and Eastern Connecticut. Its previous flagship, WNPN (89.3 FM) in Newport, broadcast from the old WLNE-TV tower in Tiverton and covered most of Rhode Island and the Massachusetts South Coast. The WNPN tower is the tallest active FM broadcast transmitter in Rhode Island (measured in height above sea level). Smaller repeater signals provided additional coverage in Providence (W275DA, WPVD), Portsmouth (WNPH) and South County (WNPE).

From April 2011 until April 2021, TPR's content was simulcast on WCVY (91.5 FM) in Coventry. From October 2011 until September 2021, TPR's content was simulcast on WELH (88.1 FM) in Providence.

Station	Frequency	City of license	First air date	Facility ID	Coordinates	Meaning	Former callsigns
WPVD-FM	103.7 MHz (HD Radio)	Westerly	October 17, 1967; Joined the network May 1, 2026	71720	41°34′23.4″N 71°37′56.2″W	Providence	WERI-FM (1967–1987); WWRX (1987–1992); WWRX-FM (1992–2004); WEEI-FM (2004–2011); WVEI-FM (2011–2026)
WNPN	89.3 MHz (HD Radio)	Newport	June 10, 2006; Joined the network September 1, 2018	163899	41°35′48.4″N 71°11′22.2″W	Newport; Providence; New Bedford	WUMD (2006–2017); WXNI (2017–2018)
W275DA	102.9 MHz	Providence	September 22, 2021	202495	41°48′17″N 71°28′22″W	(none)	(none)
WNPE	102.7 MHz	Narragansett Pier	July 15, 1989; Joined the network May 16, 2007	22874	41°25′26″N 71°28′32.1″W	similar to WNPN	WPJB (1989–1997); WAKX (1997–2007); WRNI-FM (2007–2018); WRNI (2018)
WNPH	90.7 MHz	Portsmouth	1972; Joined the network November 26, 2021	53078	41°29′53.4″N 71°27′31.2″W	similar to WNPN	WJHD (1972–2021); WNPK (2022)
WNPW	89.5 MHz	Westerly	June 21, 2024	768149	41°22′24.5″N 71°43′33.7″W	similar to WNPN	none
WPVD	1290 kHz	Providence	December 15, 1947; Joined the network May 1, 1998	48308	41°51′22.86″N 71°26′42.21″W	Providence	WNAF (1947–1949); WDEM (1949–1952); WICE (1952–1983); WRCP (1983–1998); WRNI (1998–2018); WRPA (2018–2020); WPPB (2020)

The network's programming is also available on i3 Broadband Digital Cable channel 799 in Bristol, Warren and Barrington.

==== Technology ====
WNPN transmitted using a Nautel GV15 transmitter with 10,187 watts transmitter power output (TPO) to make 7,000 watts effective radiated power (ERP). A Shivley Labs 6016 four-panel antenna array was used; the antenna was fairly directional, with nulls to avoid prohibited interference to/from WQPH (89.3 FM) Shirley, Massachusetts, to the north-northwest, and to WPKT (89.1 FM) Norwich, Connecticut, to the west-southwest. An Omnia 9 FM/HD processor from The Telos Alliance was used to keep audio levels consistent. The station broadcast in digital HD Radio, and the BBC World Service was transmitted on the HD2 of WNPN. A 67 kHz subcarrier is transmitted for the Massachusetts Radio Reading Service Audible Local Ledger.

==== HD Radio ====
WPVD-FM and WNPN broadcast in HD Radio, simulcasting the analog signal on the HD1 channel.

WNPN 89.3-HD2 broadcast the BBC World Service starting in March 2020.

WNPH, WNPE, WNPW, WPVD and W275DA did not broadcast in HD Radio.

From March 2013 until February 2018, MVYradio leased the HD2 multicast channel of WNPE to broadcast a modified content stream of WMVY (88.7 FM) on Martha's Vineyard, which could also be heard on W243AI (96.5 FM), a lower powered FM translator transmitting from the roof of Newport Hospital. Afterwards, WNPE discontinued the HD2 broadcast, but continued HD Radio operations for its main HD1 channel.

=== Television ===
Ocean State Media's television service is broadcast over WPVD-TV (channel 36) in Providence.

== Awards ==
The network has won over 30 Associated Press Awards for news coverage, seven Public Radio News Directors Inc Awards, and seven RTDNA Edward R. Murrow Awards.
