= WMVY =

Adult album alternative public radio station in Edgartown, Massachusetts

- Edgartown, Massachusetts; United States
- Broadcast area: Martha's Vineyard; Cape Cod; Greater New Bedford; Newport, Rhode Island
- Frequency: 88.7 MHz
- Branding: mvyradio

Programming
- Language: English
- Format: Adult album alternative

Ownership
- Owner: Friends of Mvyradio, Inc.

History
- First air date: 1981 (on 92.7); May 21, 2014 (on 88.7, as WMEX)
- Former call signs: WMEX (May 21–28, 2014); WMVI (May 28–June 9, 2014)
- Call sign meaning: Airport code for Martha's Vineyard

Technical information
- Licensing authority: FCC
- Facility ID: 175715
- Class: B1
- ERP: 13,000 watts
- HAAT: 83 meters (272 ft)
- Transmitter coordinates: 41°26′16.4″N 70°36′48.1″W
- Translator: See § Translators

Links
- Public license information: Public file; LMS
- Webcast: Listen live
- Website: www.mvyradio.com

WMVY (88.7 FM; "Mvyradio") is a non-commercial community-oriented radio station based in the town of Tisbury, Massachusetts, and licensed to serve Edgartown, both on the island of Martha's Vineyard. The station is owned by Friends of Mvyradio, Inc., and broadcasts an adult album alternative format.

Mvyradio is one of the most streamed internet radio stations in the world (consistently one of the Top 20 most-listened-to internet radio stations according to Webcast Metrics). Streams are available in multiple formats, including WMA, MP3, and RealAudio, and it is a featured station on Apple's iTunes radio tuner service.

== History ==
=== On 92.7 FM ===
Beginning in 1981 and ending on February 8, 2013, WMVY was a commercial radio station on 92.7 FM in Tisbury. Despite being a class "A" FM signal transmitting from Martha's Vineyard, WMVY was widely listened to in both southeastern Massachusetts (particularly the "upper" portion of Cape Cod) and the area around Newport, Rhode Island (the latter via a translator station on 96.5, W243AI).

During its last few years broadcasting on 92.7 FM, Mvyradio's operations were actually split between two companies. The radio station, WMVY, was owned by Aritaur Communications. The Web presence and online streaming were managed by mvyradio, LLC. A third entity, Friends of mvyradio, is a 501c(3) non-profit created to help offset streaming and programming expenses by enabling listeners to make tax deductible donations.

On November 27, 2012 WBUR-FM, a Boston NPR affiliate, announced that subject to FCC approval, it had reached an agreement to purchase WMVY, which would become a repeater of WBUR-FM. The purchase price was $715,000. Mvyradio's programming was to be transferred to the Friends of Mvyradio as a non-commercial Internet-only station. The switch to the WBUR simulcast (under new call letters WBUA) took place on February 9, 2013 at midnight.

=== On 88.7 FM ===
On November 7, 2013, Friends of Mvyradio announced that they had bought the broadcast license for 88.7 FM from Vineyard Public Radio Inc., which was 250 watts and had the callsign WMEX. Vineyard Public Radio had originally planned to use WMEX to carry a format of adult standards and big band music, but ran into zoning problems. WMEX began carrying Mvyradio programming at 4 p.m. on May 21, 2014, following a 20-minute stunt of ocean wave sounds. A week later, the callsign was changed to WMVI; on June 9, the WMVY callsign was assigned to the station. Also in June 2014, power was increased to 580 watts. In July 2015, power was increased to 13,000 watts, albeit using a directional antenna that reduces power westward to protect WJMF, Smithfield/Providence, which also transmits on 88.7 FM. The 13,000-watt signal covers most of Cape Cod, the Vineyard, the South Coast, and Nantucket.

== Translators ==
Broadcast translator for WMVY
Call sign	Frequency	City of license	FID	ERP (W)	FCC info
W243AI	96.5 FM	Newport, Rhode Island	77591	55	LMS

From 2013 to 2018, WMVY was heard on 96.5 FM in Newport by way of leasing 102.7-HD2 (WNPE) from Rhode Island Public Radio; this translator now directly rebroadcasts WMVY.

For a few years, beginning in June 2005, WMVY had two additional translator stations on Cape Cod: W264BA (100.7 FM) in Harwich Port and W230AW (93.9 FM) in Centerville. W230AW currently rebroadcasts WFRQ, while W264BA rebroadcasts WKFY on 100.5 as W263CU.
