= WPVD-FM =

- Westerly, Rhode Island; United States
- Broadcast area: Rhode Island; Southeastern Connecticut
- Frequency: 103.7 MHz (HD Radio)
- Branding: Ocean State Media

Programming
- Language: English
- Format: Public radio; news/talk
- Subchannels: HD2: Rhythmic CHR
- Network: Ocean State Media
- Affiliations: NPR; PRX; APM

Ownership
- Owner: Ocean State Media; (Ocean State Media Group)
- Sister stations: WNPE; WNPN; WNPH; WPVD; WPVD-TV

History
- First air date: October 17, 1967
- Former call signs: WERI-FM (1967–1987); WWRX (1987–1992); WWRX-FM (1992–2004); WEEI-FM (2004–2011); WVEI-FM (2011–2026)
- Call sign meaning: Providence

Technical information
- Licensing authority: FCC
- Facility ID: 71720
- Class: B
- ERP: 37,000 watts
- HAAT: 173 meters (568 ft)
- Transmitter coordinates: 41°34′23.4″N 71°37′56.2″W
- Translator: HD2: 93.7 W229AN (Providence)

Links
- Public license information: Public file; LMS
- Webcast: Listen live; HD2: Listen live
- Website: www.oceanstatemedia.org; HD2: thejuice937.com

WPVD-FM (103.7 MHz) is a radio station broadcasting a public radio format. The station is licensed to Westerly, Rhode Island, United States, and is owned by Ocean State Media. Its transmitter is in Exeter, Rhode Island, and its studios are located in Providence.

The station went on the air in 1967 as a commercial station, WERI-FM, eventually becoming WWRX. From 2000 until 2026, the station primarily served as a Rhode Island simulcast of Boston radio stations: WFNX from 2000 to 2004, and WEEI and WEEI-FM from 2004 to 2026. Ocean State Media bought the station in 2026, seeking to consolidate its five-station network into a single station covering most of Rhode Island.

== History ==
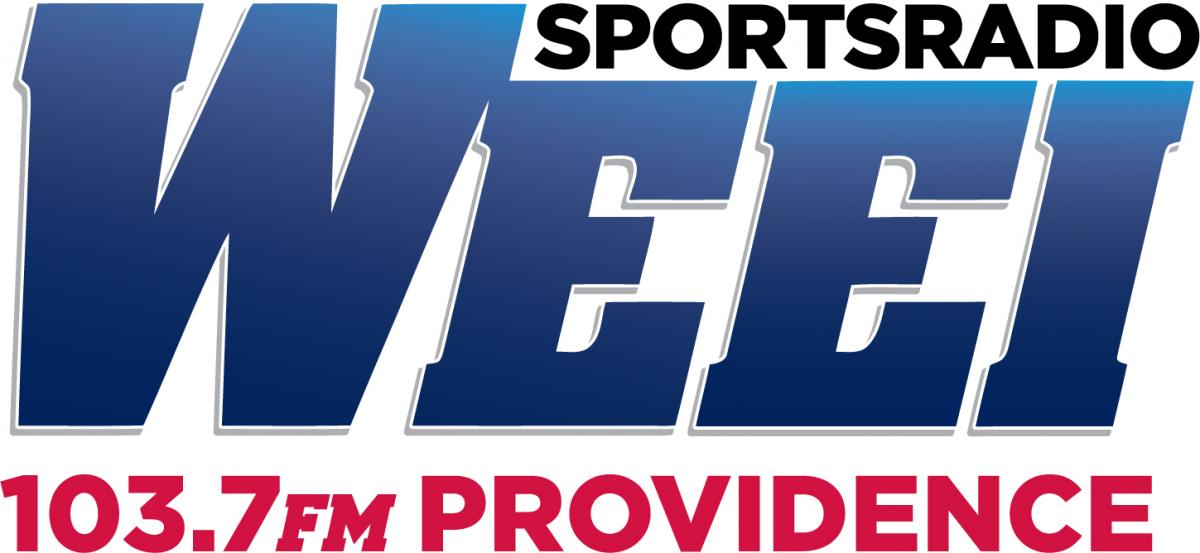
Former logo of the radio station

The station signed on October 17, 1967, as WERI-FM. At one time a simulcast of WERI (1230 AM), in the mid-1970s, WERI-FM became a separate station with an automated Drake-Chenault format called "Hit Parade". Eventually, in the early 1980s, the station switched to stereo with a live album rock format called "Number 1-04", consulted by Clark Smidt. By the mid-1980s, after a major power upgrade, it had become "RI 104", a top 40 station. On March 9, 1987, the station changed its call sign to WWRX, and the station shifted to an album rock format. Though WWRX saw some success in the New London, Connecticut, market, management opted to focus on the larger Providence market, and the station moved its transmitter from West Greenwich to Exeter in 1989. The call sign was modified to WWRX-FM on February 22, 1992, concurrent with a brief period of time in which then-sister station WHIM (1110 AM) discontinued its country format in favor of CNN Headline News under the WWRX call sign; however, the "-FM" suffix was not removed from 103.7 when the AM station reverted to WHIM and the country format in 1993.

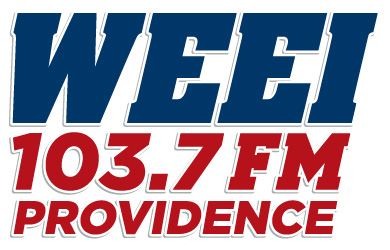
Recent logo of the radio station with "Providence" included

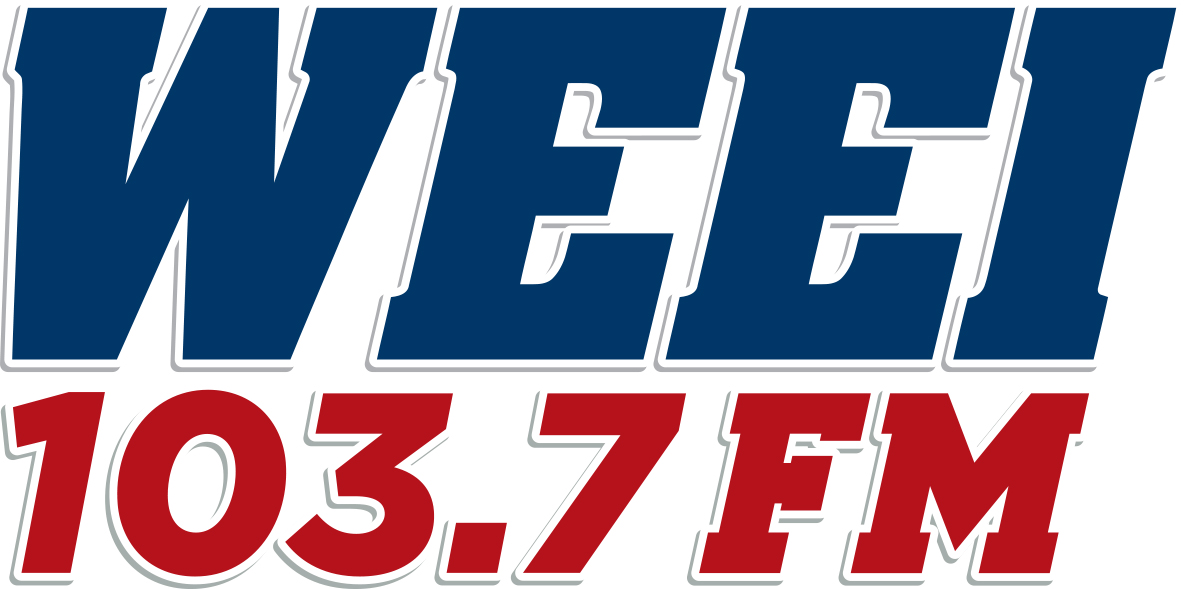
Recent logo of the radio station

WWRX-FM was acquired by Radio Equity Partners in 1995; Radio Equity Partners, in turn, was purchased by Clear Channel Communications the following year. After Clear Channel's acquisition of AMFM Broadcasting, WWRX was divested to Stephen Mindich, owner of The Providence Phoenix, similar publications in Boston and Portland, Maine, and Boston modern rock station WFNX, in 2000. Mindich switched the station to modern rock on September 7, initially as a simulcast of WFNX, and later, starting in 2003, on its own.

In March 2004, Mindich sold WWRX-FM to Entercom. As a result, the station canceled its local programming on March 22 and reverted to the WFNX simulcast on a temporary basis as Entercom prepared to relaunch WWRX with a simulcast of WEEI, its sports radio station in Boston. The change of simulcast partners took effect on-air April 16, and the station was renamed WEEI-FM. The call letters were changed to WVEI-FM on September 14, 2011, as the WEEI-FM call sign was moved to an FM station in the Boston market that had become the new flagship of the WEEI network. In addition to WEEI programming, WVEI-FM carried Providence Friars men's basketball and Boston Bruins hockey.

WVEI-FM formerly maintained a local studio and sales office in Warwick, Rhode Island; this facility was closed by Audacy (Note: Entercom changed its name to Audacy on March 30, 2021.) in April 2023.

On January 21, 2026, it was announced that Audacy would sell WVEI-FM to Ocean State Media (OSM) for $4.9 million, and that the station would become the main frequency for OSM's radio programming, replacing its existing five-station network. Audacy intended to find a new outlet for WEEI programming in the Providence market. OSM began broadcasting on the station on May 1, 2026, under the WPVD-FM call sign. Concurrently, WWBB would become the new Providence affiliate of the Boston Red Sox Radio Network. Following a transition period, the original five-station network was shut down in July 2026.

== HD Radio ==
In January 2025, Audacy leased WVEI-FM's second HD Radio channel to The Juice Broadcasting Network LLC, owned by Michael "DJ Rukiz" Costa. Costa used the subchannel, along with Diaz Holdings-owned FM translator W229AN (93.7 FM), to launch a rhythmic CHR station, "The Juice 93.7", on February 1. Ahead of the launch, WVEI-FM HD2 and W229AN would stunt with a rhythmic gold playlist. Costa had previously operated a pirate radio station on 89.9 MHz under the "Juice" name in 2018, and was a DJ on WBRU's Sunday urban contemporary programming. The Providence market's previous rhythmic CHR station, WWKX, had dropped the format in October 2024.

Broadcast translator for WVEI-FM HD2
Call sign	Frequency	City of license	FID	ERP (W)	Class	Transmitter coordinates	FCC info
W229AN	93.7 FM	Providence, Rhode Island	156667	250 (V); 0 (H)	D	41°49′15.4″N 71°23′5.2″W	LMS
