= Wheeler School =

School in Providence, Rhode Island, US

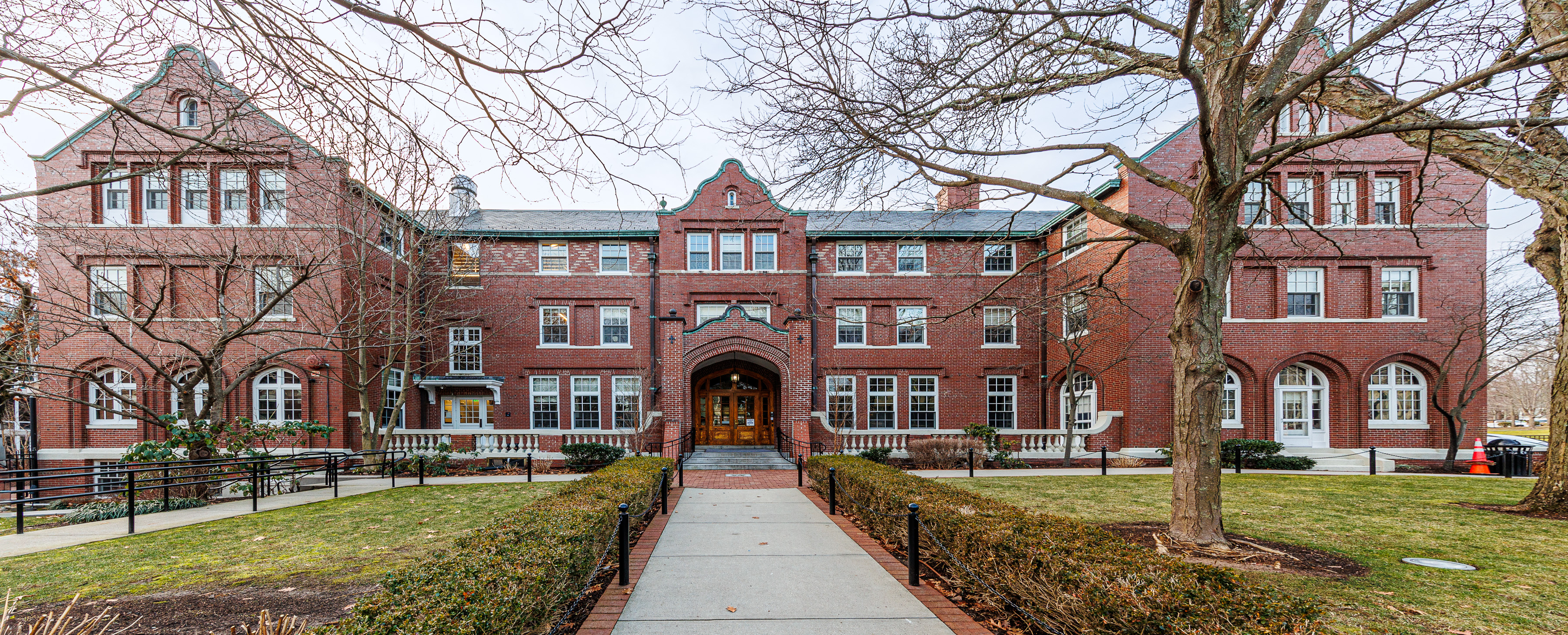
- Hope Building was the original building of the Wheeler School

Location
- 216 Hope Street; Providence, Rhode Island 02906; United States; 41°49′44″N 71°23′52″W

Information
- Type: Private
- Motto: The Spirit Giveth Life
- Established: 1889
- CEEB code: 400170
- NCES School ID: Wheeler: 01258081; Hamilton: A9300828
- Head of School: Mark Anderson
- Faculty: Wheeler: 123; Hamilton 16.3
- Enrollment: Wheeler: 788; Hamilton: 72
- Student to teacher ratio: 6.2
- Campus type: Urban, 12 acres (4.9 ha); Farm, 120 acres (49 ha)
- Colors: Purple; Gold
- Athletics: NEPSAC
- Mascot: The Warrior
- Yearbook: Gyre
- Affiliation: NAIS
- Website: www.wheelerschool.org
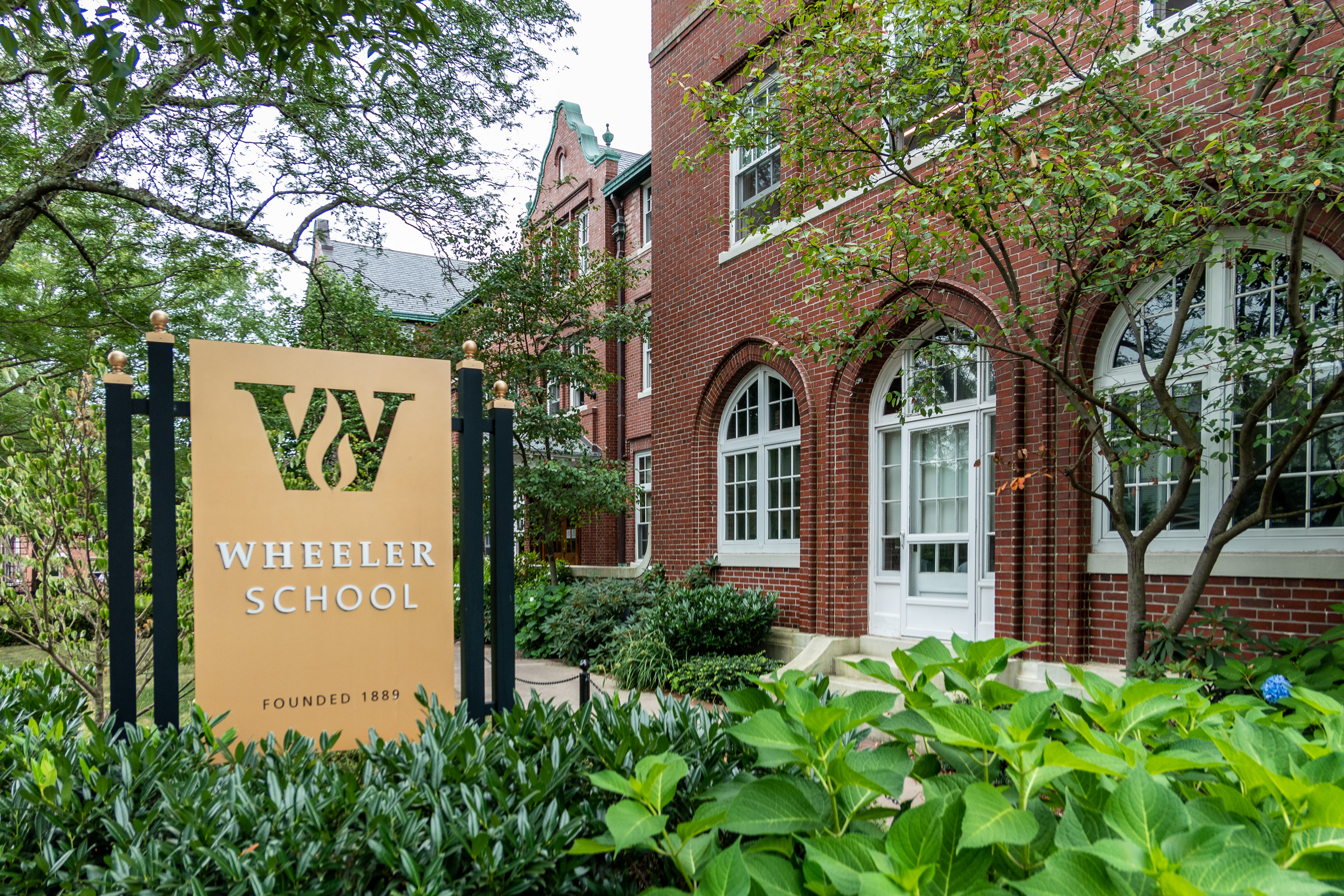

Wheeler School is a private school located on the East Side of Providence, Rhode Island, United States. The school serves students from the nursery level through twelfth-grade.

== History ==
=== Early history ===
In 1889, an art school for girls was established by Mary C. Wheeler, an artist and activist from Concord, Massachusetts. In 1900, adding an academic college preparatory curriculum to her art instruction, Mary Wheeler accepted ten female students as boarders and officially founded The Mary C. Wheeler School. A building on Brook Street was purchased, in 1898, to house girls enrolled in the preparatory program for her Cabot Street School.

In 1910, Hope Building was constructed to provide living and dining facilities required by a growing student body and faculty. In 1912, the original Fresh Air Building was completed, though it was later rebuilt. The Mary C. Wheeler School thus became one of the first American schools to use the principles of Maria Montessori in its kindergarten instruction. Wheeler also purchased the Froebel Kindergarten School which admitted boys into its pre-primary grades until the 1950s.

The daughter of a farmer, Wheeler acquired a 78-acre (32 ha) farm and house in Seekonk, Massachusetts in 1912–13. She subsequently purchased an adjoining farm and buildings, bringing the total land holdings to slightly more than 120 acres (49 ha). At one point, she advertised her school in Vogue as the Mary C. Wheeler Town & Country School.

Mary Helena Dey was hired in 1914 to reorder the school’s curriculum. As a result, the school became a pioneer in the educational theories of John Dewey. Through Dey’s contacts, such notables as Carl Sandburg came to campus to meet with students or, in Sandburg’s case, deliver the graduation address.

The first Wheeler Field Day was celebrated in 1915, and is the oldest continuously-celebrated tradition at the school.

=== Middle years: 1920-1980 ===
Wheeler died in 1920 at the age of 73. In her will she established a board of trustees to oversee the school. Mary Helena Dey, who had studied under educational theorist John Dewey at the University of Chicago, was named headmistress. In the mid-20s, the farm facilities were expanded at a cost of $4,400 to include a field hockey field and two tennis courts. The “swimming hole” was enlarged and deepened. Later an arboretum, featuring several hundred unusual plants and trees, was established at the farm in Dey's name, but has been lost to time.

In 1940, Mabel Van Norman was appointed the third headmistress on the retirement of Dey, Van Norman continued the school through the years of World War II and spent time visiting war-torn schools in the Netherlands and Belgium which Wheeler students helped to support with food and supplies. In 1950, she was succeeded by S. Rowland “Rowly” Morgan, Jr.

Morgan became the first male to lead the school and a residence was purchased, at 211 Hope Street, to provide a home outside of the girls' dormitory for his family. In 1952, the Wheeler Annual Fund was established to support the school through donations by alumni, family and friends.

In 1968, Hugh A. Madden was named headmaster. Coeducation was approved for the lower grades in 1973, and expanded to include the entire school in 1975. The name of the school officially changed to The Wheeler School. The boarding program was phased out in 1979.

=== Modern-era ===
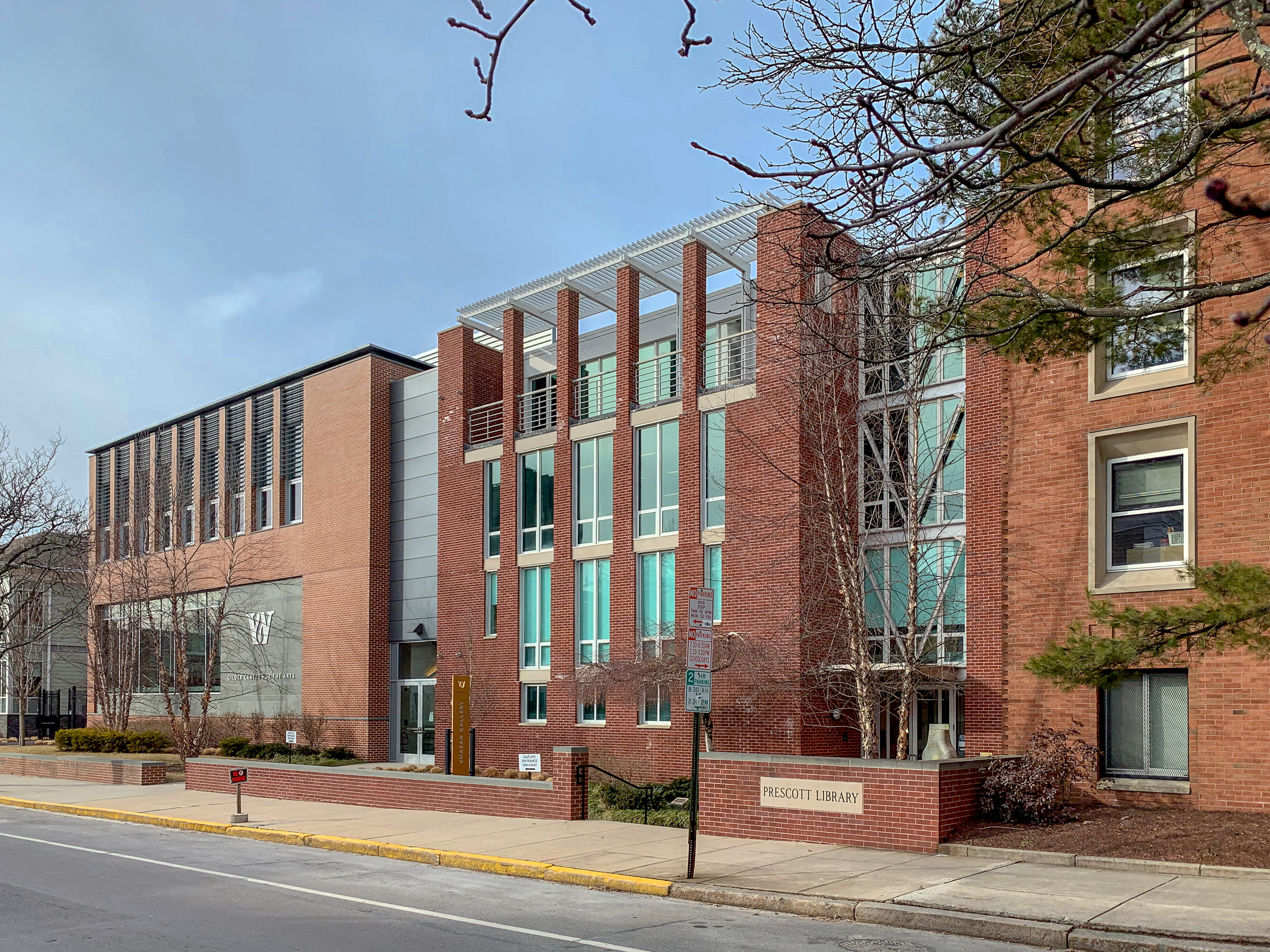
Gilder Center for the Performing Arts and Prescott Library

William C. Prescott, Jr. succeeded Hugh Madden as headmaster in 1980.

The Hamilton School at Wheeler opened in 1988 to its first group of 35 students in grades 1-6. In 1990, a new library was constructed. The building was designed by Schwartz/Silver Architects of Boston. A large division of the library is named in memory of third headmistress Mabel Van Norman.

Wheeler was the Providence site of the Summerbridge National program in 1992.

WELH-FM (Wheeler's radio station at FM 88.1) went on the air in 1994 at the end of a 10-year process begun as an Aerie student project. As of 2006, the station broadcasts Spanish-language programming in the morning and a golden oldies format in the afternoon, and the station streams via the internet. Students also use the facilities to record news programs and interviews. Since October 8, 2011, WELH has broadcast programming from Rhode Island Public Radio.

As of October 2014 the school had nearly 800 students with 200 faculty and staff. In addition to its main campus in Providence, the school has a 120-acre (49 ha) farm facility for athletics, the Sixth Grade Farm Program, summer camp, ropes course, sports programs and environmental research.

In 2014 the school dedicated a new 18,000 square foot performing arts center featuring a stepped seating auditorium, five new performing arts classrooms, studios, and storage spaces.

In 2017 Allison Gaines Pell became the Head of School, until her departure in 2025.

Mark Anderson became the new, and current, Head of School in 2025.

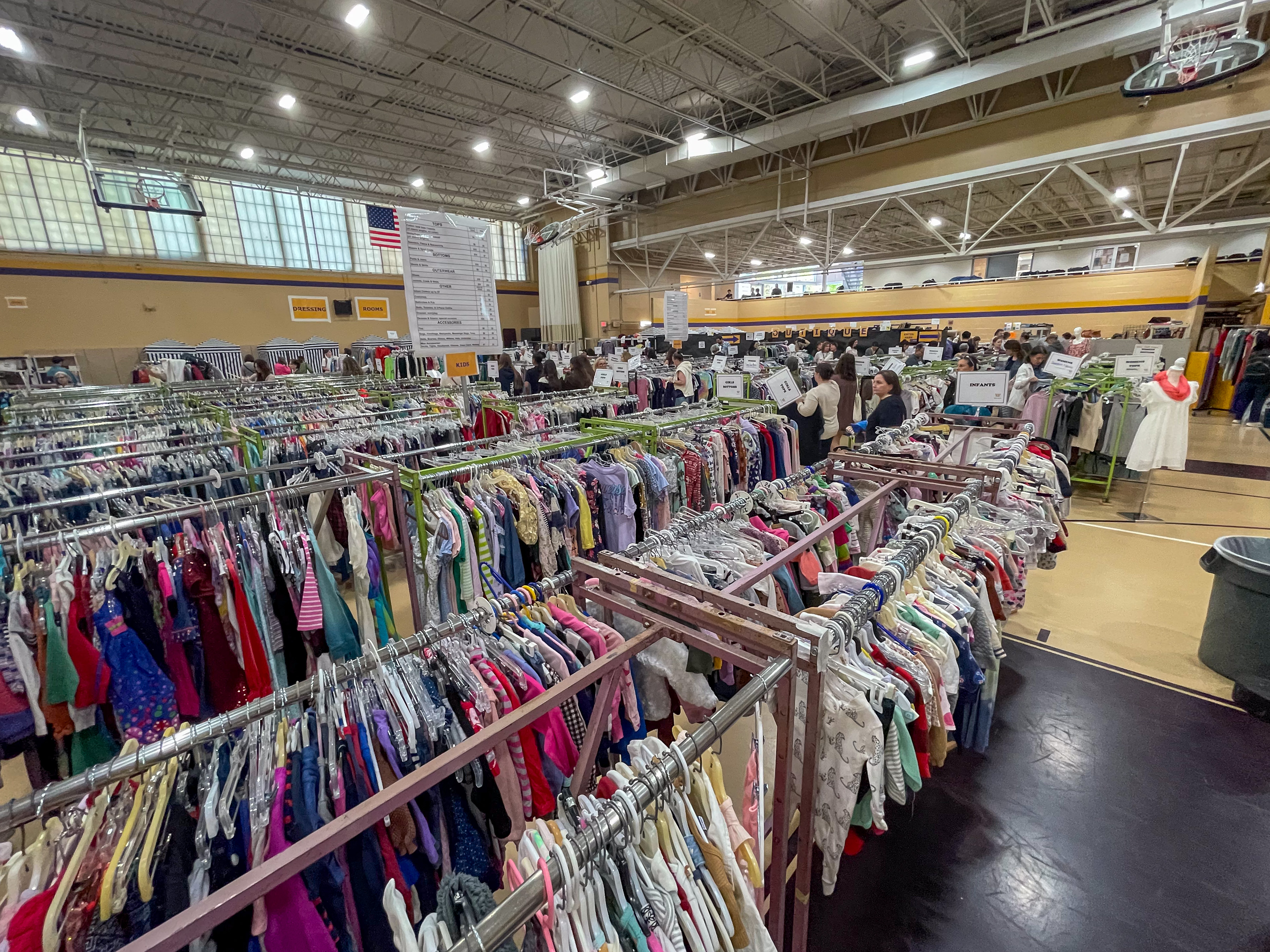
The "Famous Wheeler Clothing Sale"

== Annual clothing sale ==
In 1948, the Wheeler School began holding an annual sale as a way for parents to sell uniforms that students had outgrown. Over the years, the "Famous Wheeler Clothing Sale" has grown become an annual tradition. Each spring, donated clothes are sold to the community as a fundraiser to benefit the Wheeler School and local charities.

== Notable alumni ==
- Alice D. Engley Beek (1876-1951) - American watercolor painter
- Trudy Coxe (b. 1949) - CEO of the Preservation Society of Newport County and former Environmental Secretary of Massachusetts
- Nico Muhly (b. 1981) - contemporary classical music composer
- Josh Schwartz (b. 1976) - writer/producer of the television series The O.C., Chuck, Gossip Girl, and Hart of Dixie
- Gloria Vanderbilt (1924-2019) - American artist, author, actress, fashion designer, heiress, and socialite
- Christopher Anselmo (b. 1994) - composer and playwright
