= WNPE =

Radio station in Narragansett Pier, Rhode Island

Currently silent
- Narragansett Pier, Rhode Island; United States
- Broadcast area: Southern Rhode Island
- Frequency: 102.7 MHz (HD Radio)
- Branding: Ocean State Media

Programming
- Format: News/talk
- Network: Ocean State Media
- Affiliations: NPR; PRX; APM

Ownership
- Owner: Ocean State Media Group
- Sister stations: WNPH; WNPN; WPVD; WPVD-FM; WPVD-TV

History
- First air date: July 15, 1990 (as WPJB)
- Former call signs: WPJB (1990–1997); WAKX (1997–2007); WRNI-FM (2007–2018); WRNI (March 9–July 29, 2018)

Technical information
- Licensing authority: FCC
- Facility ID: 22874
- Class: A
- ERP: 1,950 watts
- HAAT: 69 meters (226 ft)
- Transmitter coordinates: 41°25′26″N 71°28′32.1″W
- Repeaters: WNPN; WPVD

Links
- Public license information: Public file; LMS
- Webcast: Listen live
- Website: www.oceanstatemedia.org

WNPE (102.7 FM) is a radio station providing programming to southern Rhode Island from its transmitter at Narragansett Pier. Until going silent in 2026, it was the first FM transmitter in the statewide public radio network that eventually became Ocean State Media. Prior to operating noncommercially, the 102.7 facility was a commercial radio station from its sign-on in 1990 to 2007.

== History ==
=== As a commercial radio station ===
On July 15, 1990, WPJB signed on. Reviving a historic call sign that had been abandoned at 105.1 FM in Providence when it became WWLI in 1985, WPJB broadcast an adult contemporary format and was owned and operated by Full Power Radio of Narragansett, Inc.

Full Power Radio of Narragansett sold WPJB to Back Bay Broadcasters for $1.05 million in 1997; the station became a simulcast of Back Bay's rhythmic CHR outlet WWKX "Kix 106" and changed its call letters to WAKX to reflect the new programming. WWKX-WAKX added Howard Stern to its program lineup in 1998. Back Bay became AAA Entertainment in 1999; the two companies were commonly owned.

Citadel Broadcasting acquired WWKX, WAKX, and a station in Montauk, New York, from AAA Entertainment for $16.5 million in 2003. Alongside some other Citadel stations, "Hot 106" began cutting The Howard Stern Show short in December 2004 because Stern was excessively promoting his soon-to-be-new home at Sirius Satellite Radio. Citadel's purchase of WAKX was not finished until 2005; it immediately optioned WAKX, along with WKKB in Middletown, to Davidson Media Group in a $7.5 million sale, breaking the WWKX simulcast. By 2007, WAKX was running a smooth jazz format, leased out to Craig Rapoza.

=== Sale to Rhode Island Public Radio ===
On March 23, 2007, the former Foundation for Ocean State Public Radio, renamed Rhode Island Public Radio (RIPR), announced its acquisition of WRNI (1290 AM), a National Public Radio (NPR) member station run by WBUR-FM in Boston. At the same time, the foundation announced that it was buying WAKX from Davidson for $2.65 million, funded by the Rhode Island Foundation. The acquisition brought NPR service for the first time to southern Rhode Island communities that were outside of WRNI's coverage area, beginning May 17, 2007, when WAKX became WRNI-FM and began carrying WRNI's programming full-time. WAKX's former jazz programming moved to WALE (990 AM). In 2018, concurrent with RIPR's relaunch as The Public's Radio, the call letters were changed to WNPE.

On November 9, 2023, RIPR announced its intention to merge with WSBE-TV, Rhode Island's PBS station; the merger was approved in 2024, and the combined organization became Ocean State Media in 2025. Ocean State Media consolidated its radio service on a single statewide signal, the newly-acquired WPVD-FM 103.7, on May 1, 2026. Following a transition period, the original five-station radio network, including WNPE, was taken silent in July 2026; the licenses will be sold.

== HD Radio multicast ==
From March 2013 until February 2018, MVYradio leased the HD2 multicast channel of WRNI-FM to broadcast a modified content stream of WMVY (88.7 FM) on Martha's Vineyard; this fed translator W243AI 96.5 FM, which broadcast from the roof of Newport Hospital. This allowed WMVY programming to continue being heard on the translator after the original WMVY (92.7 FM) was sold to Boston University and became WBUA.
