= WNPN =

Radio station in Newport, Rhode Island

Currently silent
- Newport, Rhode Island; United States
- Broadcast area: Rhode Island and the South Coast
- Frequency: 89.3 MHz (HD Radio)
- Branding: Ocean State Media

Programming
- Format: News/talk
- Subchannels: HD2: BBC World Service
- Network: Ocean State Media
- Affiliations: NPR; PRX; APM

Ownership
- Owner: Ocean State Media Group
- Sister stations: WNPE; WNPH; WPVD; WPVD-FM; WPVD-TV

History
- First air date: June 10, 2006 (Note: In North Dartmouth, Massachusetts; moved to Newport in 2018.)
- Former call signs: WUMD (2005–2017); WXNI (2017–2018)

Technical information
- Licensing authority: FCC
- Facility ID: 163899
- Class: B
- ERP: 7,000 watts
- HAAT: 254 meters (833 ft)
- Transmitter coordinates: 41°35′48.4″N 71°11′22.2″W

Links
- Public license information: Public file; LMS
- Webcast: Listen live
- Website: www.oceanstatemedia.org

WNPN (89.3 FM) is a radio station in Newport, Rhode Island, owned by Ocean State Media. Its transmitter is located in Tiverton, Rhode Island, from which it covers most of Rhode Island and the South Coast of Massachusetts.

The station was first built in 2006 at North Dartmouth, Massachusetts, as WUMD, the replacement for WSMU-FM 91.1 as the University of Massachusetts Dartmouth's college radio station. In 2017, the station was sold to Rhode Island Public Radio (forerunner to Ocean State Media), and moved from North Dartmouth to Newport to serve as the flagship station of its public radio service, joining repeater stations WNPE (102.7 FM) in Narragansett Pier and WPVD (1290 AM and 102.9 FM) in Providence. The network provides the sole local public radio outlet for Rhode Island. In 2026, the original network was supplanted by the statewide signal of WPVD-FM 103.7 from Westerly.

== Technical information ==
WNPN transmits using a Nautel GV15 transmitter with 10,187 watts transmitter power output to make 7,000 watts effective radiated power. A Shively Labs 6016 four-panel antenna array is used. An Omnia 9 FM/HD processor from The Telos Alliance is used to keep audio levels consistent. A 67 kHz subcarrier is transmitted for the Massachusetts Radio Reading Service Audible Local Ledger.

The station broadcasts in digital HD Radio, with the HD2 channel devoted to a 24/7 feed of the BBC World Service.

== History ==
The station signed on June 10, 2006, as WUMD in North Dartmouth, Massachusetts, owned by the University of Massachusetts Dartmouth. WUMD served as a replacement for WSMU-FM, which began with 10 watts of power on 91.1 MHz as WUSM in September 1973. Its first studio was in the cafeteria basement. In the fall of 1974, WUSM moved its studio to the campus center and increased power. It remained a student-programmed station throughout the next three decades. The call letters changed to WSMU-FM in 1989. In June 2006, UMass Dartmouth sold the 91.1 frequency to the Educational Media Foundation, which relaunched it as WTKL; the programming that had been on WSMU-FM then moved to the new WUMD on 89.3.

=== Sale to Rhode Island Public Radio ===
On January 4, 2017, it was announced that UMass Dartmouth was selling WUMD to Rhode Island Public Radio (RIPR) for $1.5 million and $617,100 worth of underwriting for 10 years. RIPR intended to move WUMD to Tiverton, Rhode Island, to simulcast its programming. The Federal Communications Commission (FCC) approved the transfer of the station license on May 1, 2017. WUMD signed off for the final time at noon on June 26, 2017, following the consummation of the purchase. Rhode Island Public Radio began broadcasting its NPR news/talk format on July 12, 2017, and the callsign changed to WXNI. An FCC construction permit was sought and obtained to move 89.3 to the former tower of local ABC affiliate WLNE-TV in Tiverton, greatly increasing the area covered by the signal. The designated community of license was also to change from North Dartmouth, Massachusetts, to Newport, Rhode Island. On July 29, 2018, in preparation for the final move to Tiverton, the callsign was changed to WNPN. The FCC approval of the move to Newport was granted effective August 13, 2018.

Owing to its roots as a college radio station, WNPN, like its predecessors, operated at relatively modest power on paper for a full NPR member on the FM band. However, it now broadcast from the tallest active FM tower in Rhode Island, at 833 feet (254 m); only WLVO's auxiliary site in Johnston is taller.The new tower added over 700,000 people in Rhode Island and the South Coast to its coverage area. As a result, while not quite a "statewide" signal, it now provided at least secondary coverage to almost all of Rhode Island, and also brought a city-grade NPR signal to New Bedford and most of the South Coast for the first time ever. Two months after signing on WNPN from its new site, Rhode Island Public Radio acknowledged its new listenership in Massachusetts by rebranding itself as "The Public's Radio".

On November 9, 2023, RIPR announced its intention to merge with WSBE-TV, Rhode Island's PBS station; the merger was approved in 2024, and the combined organization became Ocean State Media in 2025. Ocean State Media consolidated its radio service on a single statewide signal, the newly-acquired WPVD-FM 103.7, on May 1, 2026. Following a transition period, the original five-station radio network, including WNPN, was taken silent in July 2026; the licenses will be sold.
