= WSNN-LD =

Television station in Sarasota, Florida

- Sarasota, Florida; United States
- Channels: Digital: 26 (UHF); Virtual: 39
- Branding: SNN: Suncoast News Network

Programming
- Affiliations: 39.1: Independent with MyNetworkTV; for others, see § Subchannels

Ownership
- Owner: Nexstar Media Group; (Nexstar Media Inc.)
- Sister stations: WFLA-TV, WTTA; Tegna: WTSP

History
- First air date: December 13, 2011
- Former call signs: WLWN-LD (2011–2014)
- Former channel numbers: Digital: 39 (UHF, 2014–2018)
- Call sign meaning: "Suncoast News Network"

Technical information
- Licensing authority: FCC
- Facility ID: 189978
- Class: LD
- ERP: 14.9 kW
- HAAT: 147.8 m (485 ft)
- Transmitter coordinates: 27°20′27″N 82°27′54″W

Links
- Public license information: LMS
- Website: www.snntv.com

WSNN-LD (channel 39) is a low-power television station in Sarasota, Florida, United States. It is owned by Nexstar Media Group alongside NBC affiliate WFLA-TV (channel 8) and CW station WTTA (channel 38); Nexstar's Tegna subsidiary owns CBS affiliate WTSP (channel 10). WSNN-LD's Suncoast News Network (SNN) service provides news coverage focusing primarily on the North Port–Bradenton–Sarasota Metropolitan Statistical Area (including Sarasota, Manatee, and Charlotte counties). In addition to airing syndicated programming seen on its sister stations, it also carries programming from the MyNetworkTV syndication service as a prime time offering. SNN originally operated in conjunction with then-sister newspaper Sarasota Herald-Tribune, and is headquartered on 6th Street in downtown Sarasota. The station's transmitter is located on Fruitville Road in unincorporated Sarasota County.

== History ==
WSNN-LD logo used from 2014 to 2023.

On January 24, 1995, the Sarasota Herald-Tribune and Comcast announced a partnership to create a 24-hour news channel serving Sarasota and Charlotte counties. The name of the channel was announced on May 20, 1995, as Sarasota News Now. The SNN operation was launched on July 17, 1995. Over its history, it was branded as SNN Local News, SNN Local News 6, SNN News 6 and Six News Now, which were often used interchangeably. SNN received national attention in 2007, when a clip of chief meteorologist Justin Mosely (who worked with the channel from 2004 to 2013 and returned in March 2014) reacting frightened after a cockroach crawled up his leg during a live weather segment went viral after it was posted on various video websites including YouTube.

In November 2008, the Sarasota Herald-Tribune (then owned by The New York Times Company) announced that it would sell SNN News 6, and stop broadcasting at the end of December 2008. This deadline was extended after the company struck agreements with a group of investors, led by SNN general manager Linda DesMaris and her husband Doug Barker, to purchase the channel; however on January 25, 2009, one of the investors dropped out of the deal. On January 27, 2009, the Herald-Tribune announced that SNN News 6 would go dark, effective at midnight on January 28, 2009. The company would later find another investor in Phil Lombardo, CEO of the television station group Citadel Communications in Bronxville, New York. On February 26, 2009, after a four-week hiatus, SNN was back on the air under the management of LDB Media, LLC, with the majority of its former on-air staff. Since its inception, the channel was exclusively carried on Comcast's systems in Sarasota and Charlotte counties. In the summer of 2012, SNN struck a carriage deal with Verizon FiOS to add the channel; FiOS began carrying SNN in the Sarasota area at 2 a.m. Eastern Time on September 13, 2012. Over time, other cable systems were added, expanding coverage around the Sarasota–Manatee area.

In January 2014, Lombardo and Citadel Communications acquired a majority interest in the company. As a result, Citadel took over broadcast operations of SNN. During February 2014, the SNN studio facilities underwent a major remodeling. One month earlier on February 12, SNN debuted a new graphics package. weather graphics were rolled out on February 22. On March 2, the channel debuted a new logo (an "SNN" wordmark with a blue wave underneath) and rebranded as SNN – Suncoast News Network. The following day on March 3 at 5 p.m. Eastern, SNN unveiled a new main news set and weather center (the latter of which incorporates the logo previously used under the SNN Local News 6 brand). The station's image resembles those of Citadel stations WLNE-TV in Providence, Rhode Island, and KLKN in Lincoln, Nebraska, who have become sister stations to SNN. It was also the only non-ABC affiliated television station owned by Citadel after CBS affiliate WHBF-TV in Rock Island, Illinois, was sold to Nexstar Media Group in 2014; in 2019, Citadel sold WLNE and KLKN to Standard Media, with WSNN being the only remaining television station under Citadel ownership until July 2023.

On September 24, 2014, Citadel announced that SNN's operations would be merged with its over-the-air television station in Sarasota, WLWN-LD (channel 39), on October 15; as part of the consolidation, WLWN changed its call letters to WSNN-LD. The combined station retains SNN's existing programming and cable carriage. On April 15, WSNN launched two subchannels from Katz Broadcasting: Grit and Laff.

On May 16, 2019, it was announced that Standard Media, led by former Young Broadcasting and Media General executive Deb McDermott, would acquire Citadel's WLNE and KLKN for $83 million. The sale was completed on September 5.

SNN was the first television news operation to convert to an all digital-disk-based non-linear editing system through Avid. SNN was one of the first news operations to have a combined print and broadcast newsroom, collaborating with the Sarasota Herald-Tribune on news content. Since 2002, SNN has maintained a content-sharing agreement with Tampa-based NBC affiliate WFLA-TV (channel 8) and NBC News, which allows SNN to use stories from WFLA, NBC News and NBC-affiliated stations (that agreement replaced an earlier deal between the channel, Fox owned-and-operated station WTVT (channel 13), and the now-defunct CONUS Communications), and also allowed for cooperation between the Herald-Tribune and the Tampa Tribune, prior to Media General's sale of that paper to World Media Holdings in 2012.

SNN also operates one weather and traffic camera since April 2014; the camera was installed atop of One Sarasota Tower, under a brand licensing deal with various local companies over the years. SNN began multiplex programming on February 2, 2015. On June 15, 2015, Verizon FiOS changed channels of SNN from 26/526 to channel 9/509. In 2016, SNN upgraded graphics and slightly updated logo. Later that year, the Herald Tribune moved out of their former space and made their way next door into the old SunTrust building. It is unclear if SNN will be moving to the new facility as in 2018, Sarasota Memorial Hospital announced it would buy out the old Herald Tribune building and re-construct the entire area. In 2018, SNN re-vamped their website, now offering live-streams of their Skycam, newscasts as they happen, job offerings, calendars and event planning.

On May 19, 2023, Citadel Communications COO Ray Cole announced that WSNN-LD would be sold to Nexstar Media Group (owner of WFLA-TV and WTTA (channel 38)) for $1 million. Nexstar had previously acquired Midwestern television stations KCAU-TV in Sioux City, WHBF-TV in the Quad Cities, and WOI-DT in Des Moines from Citadel in 2014 (Nexstar still owns all three). The sale was completed on July 20. On September 1, with WTTA becoming Tampa Bay's station for The CW, WSNN-LD would transition to carrying MyNetworkTV in prime time from WTTA, the latter of which rebroadcasts the network overnights from 1 to 3 a.m.

== Programming ==
SNN features live newscasts for 7 1/2 hours on weekdays and two hours on weekends, barring any breaking news that could extend its time, as well as live weather segments during the morning and evening hours, with more frequent updates during severe weather events. The station occasionally broadcasts parades in the area, including boat shows and fireworks shows near Christmas and New Year's.

In addition to regular rolling news programming, SNN also airs two local talk shows:

- Suncoast FYI, hosted by Nancy O'Neil, is focused on speaking with non-profit and volunteer leaders around the Sarasota Area about events and programs
- Suncoast POV, hosted by Craig Burdick, is focused on speaking with civil, political, and business leaders about current events

SNN also carries a limited selection of syndicated programming seen on its sister stations.

== Technical information ==
=== Subchannels ===
The station's signal is multiplexed:

Subchannels of WSNN-LD
Subchannel	Res.	Short name	Programming
39.1	1080i	WSNN-LD	Main WSNN-LD programming
39.2	480i	Grit	Grit
39.3	480i	Laff	Laff
39.4	1080i	CourtTV	Court TV

== See also ==
- Bay News 9 – a similar 24-hour regional cable news channel for the Tampa Bay area operated by Spectrum
- News 13 – a similar 24-hour regional cable news channel for the Orlando area operated by Spectrum
