= KTIV =

Television station in Sioux City, Iowa

- Sioux City, Iowa; United States
- Channels: Digital: 14 (UHF); Virtual: 4
- Branding: KTIV 4; News 4; Siouxland CW (4.2)

Programming
- Affiliations: 4.1: NBC; 4.2: CW+; for others, see § Subchannels

Ownership
- Owner: Gray Media; (Gray Television Licensee, LLC)

History
- First air date: October 10, 1954
- Former channel numbers: Analog: 4 (VHF, 1954-2009); Digital: 41 (UHF, 2002–2018)
- Former affiliations: ABC (secondary, 1954–1967)
- Call sign meaning: Television IV (Roman numeral 4)

Technical information
- Licensing authority: FCC
- Facility ID: 66170
- ERP: 1,000 kW
- HAAT: 609.5 m (2,000 ft)
- Transmitter coordinates: 42°35′12″N 96°13′19″W
- Translator(s): K24JG-D Norfolk, NE

Links
- Public license information: Public file; LMS
- Website: ktiv.com

KTIV (channel 4) is a television station in Sioux City, Iowa, United States, affiliated with NBC and The CW Plus. Owned by Gray Media, the station has studios on Signal Hill Drive in Sioux City, and its transmitter is located near Hinton, Iowa.

KTIV was the second television station to be built in Sioux City. It signed on in 1954 as a joint operation between Sioux City radio stations KCOM and KSCJ and was an NBC affiliate from the first day on air, though it also aired some programs from ABC until 1967. Tom Brokaw, later the anchor of the NBC Nightly News and a native of Yankton, South Dakota, got his start in television at the station in the early 1960s. KSCJ's owners, the Perkins Bros. Corp., became the full owners of the station in 1965, a year in which it built its present tower at Hinton as a joint venture with its primary competitor, KVTV (now KCAU-TV).

Black Hawk Broadcasting acquired KTIV in 1974 and opened the station's present studios on Signal Hill three years later. Under the ownership of American Family Broadcasting in the 1980s, KTIV improved its news department and pushed past a once-dominant KCAU-TV to become the highest-rated station in Sioux City, a position it has retained ever since. Quincy Newspapers Inc. acquired KTIV in 1989. Gray Television acquired Quincy in 2021.

== History ==
=== Early years ===
The KCOM Broadcasting Company applied on February 27, 1952, for a new television station on channel 4 in Sioux City. The application was made in anticipation of the Federal Communications Commission (FCC) lifting in the near future a years-long freeze on television station grants. Soon after, another group also filed for channel 4: Perkins Bros. Inc., the owners of Sioux City radio station KSCJ and sister to the Sioux City Journal newspaper. In September 1952, the FCC ordered hearings to be held on the competing applicants for channel 4. However, no hearings were held, as the commission worked through a large backlog of competing TV applications. Instead, in December 1953, KCOM and KSCJ combined their applications; the KCOM Broadcasting Company gave KSCJ an option to acquire half the company and agreed to sell off KCOM. The merger of the KCOM and KSCJ applications cleared the way for the FCC to grant a construction permit on January 20, 1954.

Tower construction began in May at a site in Plymouth County, and KTIV affiliated with NBC and ABC. However, the company had yet to announce where its studios would be located. The station put out its first test pattern on September 23 and intended to be on air in time for the 1954 World Series, but officials could not establish a link between the studio and transmitter site to air the games, leaving Sioux City's other TV station—KVTV (channel 9)—to air the Series. In order to get the signal past a tree that blocked the way, the height of the microwave antenna had to be raised twice. KTIV went on the air on October 10, 1954, with programming from NBC, ABC, and the DuMont Television Network; it had no local programming, as its studios at 10th and Grandview streets had not been completed. Shortly after signing on the air, KSCJ exercised the option to buy half of KTIV, which the FCC approved in March 1955. After the change in ownership, the station increased its effective radiated power to 100,000 watts, the maximum allowed on channel 4, improving reception in rural areas beyond Sioux City; the FCC granted this on May 13, 1955, and the increase took effect five days later. The DuMont network disappeared in September 1955; the station also briefly affiliated with the NTA Film Network, which began in 1956.

In 1961, KTIV hired Tom Brokaw, a native of Yankton, South Dakota. Brokaw earned $75 a week (equivalent to $783 in 2024) to be a staff announcer and part-time weatherman and newscaster. Brokaw worked at the station while enrolled at the University of South Dakota. From KTIV, Brokaw went on to jobs in Omaha and Atlanta before joining KNBC in Los Angeles in 1966, the first in a series of posts at NBC before later anchoring the NBC Nightly News.

Perkins Bros. acquired the remainder of the company from the former KCOM group in 1965, spending $2.2 million. Prior to then, Perkins Bros. had been a silent partner, and management duties belonged to Dietrich Dirks, who had founded KCOM. That December, after seven years of joint work and the withdrawal of an objection by KQTV in Fort Dodge, KTIV moved to a new tower near Hinton, Iowa, that it co-owned with KVTV. KTIV then donated its previous 700-foot (210 m) tower to South Dakota Educational Television, which reassembled the mast near Beresford. The station continued to split ABC programs with KVTV until 1967, when KVTV became KCAU-TV and a full-time ABC affiliate, while new station KMEG acquired the CBS affiliation.

=== Black Hawk Broadcasting and American Family ownership ===
When I started here [in 1976], we were an embarrassment. We used to be located behind the cathedral on 10th Street, we had a pool hall over us, no money and only one news guy.

— Mike Beecher, KTIV news director in 1984, describing the situation when he arrived at the station

In November 1973, Perkins Bros. sold KTIV to Black Hawk Broadcasting, which owned television and radio stations in Waterloo and in Austin, Minnesota, for $2.5 million. Ground was broken in 1976 on a new studio facility within the Stonesthrow Office Complex, atop Sioux City's Signal Hill. KTIV began broadcasting from the new structure on June 5, 1977; it was the only studio in the area purpose-built for television and was fitted out with electronic news gathering equipment. The facility also aided Black Hawk in its push to expand the station's staff; the station payroll grew from 32 employees in 1974 to 58 in 1978.

Black Hawk Broadcasting merged into American Family Broadcasting, the broadcast division of insurer American Family Corporation (today better known as Aflac), in a deal announced in 1979 and completed in 1980. In the deal, Black Hawk spun off all of its other broadcast stations except KTIV and KWWL in Waterloo to meet FCC ownership limits.

=== Quincy and Gray ownership ===
Quincy Newspapers Inc. acquired KTIV from American Family in 1989. Quincy owned no stations in Iowa, but it did own broadcast properties in Illinois, Indiana, Minnesota, and West Virginia, three of which were NBC affiliates like KTIV. At the time, Sioux City was the smallest market in which American Family owned a TV station. To run KTIV, Quincy hired William F. Turner, who had been the general manager at KCAU-TV when Forward Communications owned it and worked in the corporate office of KCAU's then-owner, Citadel Communications; Turner had a long-term friendship with the Oakley family, owners of Quincy Newspapers.

On September 16, 2002, KTIV began broadcasting a digital signal on UHF channel 41. The station continued dual analog and digital broadcasts until it shut down its analog signal on February 17, 2009, the original date for full-power stations to convert to digital service. KTIV continued to broadcast on channel 41, using virtual channel 4, until it switched to channel 14 in 2018 as a result of the 2016 United States wireless spectrum auction.

KTIV assumed ad sales responsibility in 2003 for "KXWB", the local The WB 100+ Station Group station; KCAU-TV had been providing advertising and marketing services to the cable-only service when it launched in 1998. When The WB merged with UPN to form The CW in 2006, KTIV obtained the affiliation and programmed the network on its second subchannel.

In 2021, Gray Television purchased Quincy Media for $925 million.

== News operation ==
Local news debuted within the station's first year of operation. Ken Wayman, the station's first news director in the 1950s, was also the first reporter to take a still camera into an Iowa courtroom; he won a national award from the Radio Television News Directors Association for his coverage.

For most of the late 1960s and 1970s, KCAU-TV was the dominant station in the market, with a nearly two-to-one ratings lead. It also benefited from being the most accessible ABC affiliate to many viewers in the Sioux Falls, South Dakota, market. However, when ABC moved its Sioux Falls market affiliation from KORN-TV/KXON-TV/KDLT in Mitchell to KSFY-TV in Sioux Falls, this factor disappeared. KTIV had been improving its coverage steadily for several years; most notably, it had hired Dave Nixon (Sr.), a former KCAU anchor, who returned to Sioux City and KTIV after two years with WHO-TV in Des Moines. Dave Nixon's son, Dave Nixon Jr., worked as a weekend anchor at the station while his father presented the weeknight newscasts. Between Nixon Sr.'s hiring and the loss of KCAU's ABC viewership advantage, as well as promotional tactics to increase viewership in outlying communities within the market, KTIV surged past KCAU-TV for first place. Dave Nixon Sr. departed in 1990 to start a broadcasting program at Iowa Lakes Community College, but his son returned to Sioux City from Mankato, Minnesota, in 1992 to serve as KTIV's news director. Turner remained with KTIV until his retirement in 1994.

In 1989, KTIV cameras captured the crash of United Airlines Flight 232 in Sioux City. Reporter-photographer Dave Boxum was the only television cameraman positioned to see the airplane hit the ground and explode into a fireball. Footage from the crash was intended as an exclusive for the station and NBC but mistakenly received far wider distribution. To uplink the pictures, KTIV had to use a Conus Communications transponder, inadvertently making the footage available to 135 member stations of Conus when it was intended only for NBC and its affiliates. The footage wound up being widely used, including by KCAU-TV, which obtained it from ABC, and by CBS, which did not have permission.

KTIV expanded its news department in 2023, coinciding with the closing of the newsroom at Sinclair Broadcast Group-owned KPTH. Three KPTH news employees, including former KTIV anchor Larry Wentz, joined channel 4's staff. The station introduced an expanded noon newscast and Saturday and Sunday morning news programs.

=== Notable former on-air staff ===
- Paul Moyer
- Gene Sherman – sportscaster, 1985–1994
- Terry Zahn – newscaster, 1978–1980

== Subchannels ==
KTIV's transmitter is located near Hinton, Iowa. The station's signal is multiplexed:

Subchannels of KTIV
Subchannel	Res.	Short name	Programming
4.1	1080i	KTIVNBC	NBC
4.2	720p	KTIVCW	The CW Plus
4.3	480i	KTIVME	MeTV
4.4	480i	CourtTV	Court TV
4.5	480i	Ion	Ion
4.6	480i	Outlaw	Outlaw
4.7	480i	KTIVMTX	
