= WLNE-TV =

Television station in New Bedford, Massachusetts

- New Bedford, Massachusetts; Providence, Rhode Island; United States
- City: New Bedford, Massachusetts
- Channels: Digital: 24 (UHF); Virtual: 6

Programming
- Affiliations: 6.1: Roar; for others, see § Subchannels

Ownership
- Owner: Standard Media; (Community News Media LLC)
- Operator: Sinclair Broadcast Group (outright sale pending)
- Sister stations: WJAR

History
- First air date: January 1, 1963
- Former call signs: WTEV (1963–1980)
- Former channel numbers: Analog: 6 (VHF, 1963–2009); Digital: 49 (UHF, 2004−2019)
- Former affiliations: ABC (1963–1977, 1995–2025); CBS (1977–1995)
- Call sign meaning: "We Love New England"

Technical information
- Licensing authority: FCC
- Facility ID: 22591
- ERP: 294 kW
- HAAT: 302 m (991 ft)
- Transmitter coordinates: 41°51′55.4″N 71°17′12.7″W

Links
- Public license information: Public file; LMS

WLNE-TV (channel 6) is a television station licensed to New Bedford, Massachusetts, United States, serving the Providence, Rhode Island, area with programming from the digital multicast network Roar. It is owned by Standard Media and operated by Sinclair Broadcast Group alongside NBC/ABC affiliate WJAR (channel 10). The two stations share studios on Kenney Drive in Cranston, Rhode Island, and transmitter facilities in Rehoboth, Massachusetts.

== History ==
=== Early years (1963–1977) ===
The station began broadcasting as an ABC affiliate on January 1, 1963, as WTEV from studios on 430 County Street in New Bedford. The station's inaugural broadcast actually began at 11:58 p.m. on December 31, 1962, with the playing of "Auld Lang Syne" by Mitch Miller, followed by greetings from local political and religious leaders. WTEV's transmitter was located in Little Compton, Rhode Island, with the antenna mounted on a 500-foot (150 m) tower; a few years later, WTEV moved to a 950-foot (290 m) tower in Tiverton. The Tiverton transmitter was still 20 miles (32 km) away from the transmitter sites in Rehoboth used by the existing stations in the Providence market, WJAR-TV (channel 10) and WPRO-TV (channel 12, now WPRI-TV). However, WTEV could not build a tower in Rehoboth due to the risk of interference with WRGB in Schenectady, New York, WCSH-TV in Portland, Maine, and WFIL-TV in Philadelphia, which all broadcast on channel 6 in the analog era. Before cable arrived in Rhode Island in the early 1970s, this resulted in viewers experiencing reception problems with WTEV because of its signal being sent from a different direction than WJAR-TV and WPRO-TV/WPRI-TV. This forced viewers to mount their outdoor antennas on rotators to get a passable signal from the station. The ensuing signal problems would be the bane of channel 6's existence for 45 years.

ABC had a curious history in Rhode Island prior to WTEV's sign-on. In the earliest years of television in Providence, all four networks (including DuMont) were shoehorned on primary NBC affiliate WJAR-TV, at that time the market's only television station (WJAR carried about half of NBC's and CBS' programming, but very few ABC or DuMont shows). WNET launched on channel 16 in 1954 as an ABC affiliate. However, it was forced off the air in 1955 due to the difficulties faced by UHF startups at the time. Since television manufacturers were not required to include UHF tuning capability on television sets prior to 1964, viewers needed an expensive converter (or an all-channel set, the latter being very rare at the time) to watch WNET, and the picture was marginal at best even with one. For the seven years prior to channel 6's sign-on, WJAR and CBS affiliate WPRO-TV cherry-picked ABC programming, usually airing it in off-hours but occasionally preempting their primary network's schedule. Much of Rhode Island could access the full ABC schedule from Boston stations—WHDH-TV (channel 5, now occupied by WCVB-TV) prior to January 1, 1961, and WNAC-TV (channel 7, presently occupied by the present-day WHDH [not to be confused with the now-defunct WHDH on channel 5]) from 1961 to 1963.

Even though Providence was big enough to support three full network affiliates, it soon became apparent that channel 16 would not be resurrected in the near future. The owners of the future WTEV decided to seek a waiver of FCC technical regulations to allow VHF channel 6 to be added to the FCC's Table of Allocations. The channel 6 license had originally been allocated to the island of Nantucket off Cape Cod, in the Boston market. However, at the time, Federal Communications Commission (FCC) rules required that a station have its studios and offices located in its community of license, and numerous FCC filings argued that it was not practical to operate a full-service television station from Nantucket. Since a channel 6 allocation in the Providence area would have been short-spaced to WCSH-TV, WFIL-TV and WRGB, the FCC allocation was modified to New Bedford—the nearest city on the Massachusetts side of the market where a transmitter could be built that could decently cover Providence while protecting all three stations from interference.

New Bedford and Bristol County are part of the Rhode Island market due to Rhode Island's small geographic size, even though the rest of eastern Massachusetts is in the Boston market (counties were assigned by Arbitron and Nielsen to a particular television market based upon their viewing patterns). The advent of satellite television made this an irritation to some Massachusetts subscribers of services such as DirecTV and Dish Network who are unable to receive Massachusetts news and sports from Boston stations. The FCC allows network affiliates to prevent satellite subscribers from receiving network stations from outside the station's designated market. Bristol County is the only part of Massachusetts associated with Rhode Island for television purposes.

WTEV was founded by WTEV Television, Inc., a group that was 55-percent owned by E. Anthony and Sons, publisher of the New Bedford Standard-Times and owner of WNBH radio (1340 AM and 98.1 FM, now WCTK); the remaining 45 percent was held by New England Television, the holder of the license for the old WNET. In 1966, shortly after E. Anthony and Sons sold the Standard-Times and WNBH, WTEV was purchased by Steinman Stations of Lancaster, Pennsylvania.

=== Switch to CBS (1977–1995) ===
On June 27, 1977, WTEV swapped affiliations with WPRI and became a CBS affiliate after Knight Ridder Television, which had just purchased WPRI, cut an affiliation deal that switched two of the three television stations it owned at the time to ABC. At the time, ABC was aggressively pursuing strong NBC and CBS affiliates to switch as their ratings rose during the late 1970s, and succeeded in persuading some longtime NBC and CBS stations to switch (as an example, KSTP-TV in Minneapolis–Saint Paul and WSB-TV in Atlanta, both longtime NBC affiliates, switched to ABC during that period).

In 1979, the Steinmans sold WTEV and their flagship station, WGAL-TV in Lancaster, to Pulitzer Publishing. This sale reunited them with KOAT-TV in Albuquerque, New Mexico, which had been sold to Pulitzer in 1969. Pulitzer changed channel 6's call letters to the present-day WLNE-TV on September 8, 1980. The new call letters were used as a promotional acronym: "We Love New England". The WTEV call sign was later used on the CBS affiliate in Jacksonville, Florida, from March 1996 until September 2014, when that station changed its call sign to WJAX-TV. Under Pulitzer, the station acquired studio space in the Orms Building in downtown Providence. Within a few years, most of the station's main operations were moved to Providence. The original New Bedford facility was used as a news bureau, secondary studio, and sales office through the late 1980s.

In 1983, Pulitzer sold WLNE to Freedom Communications. This sale was necessary because Pulitzer had acquired WFBC-TV (now WYFF) in Greenville, South Carolina, and WXII-TV in Winston-Salem, North Carolina, that same year, leaving the company one VHF station over the FCC's ownership limit of the time.

=== Return to ABC (1995–2025) ===
Logo as ABC 6, used until 2025.

CBS announced in March 1995 that it would purchase WPRI-TV and move its programming there. That May, Freedom agreed to affiliate WLNE with ABC in a long-term deal tied to the renewal of the network's affiliation with WTVC in Chattanooga, Tennessee; in the process, it rejected a bid by Fox to move its affiliation from WNAC-TV (channel 64, and the legal successor to the former WNET) to WLNE. At midnight on September 10, 1995, WPRI and WLNE reversed the 1977 swap; WLNE then began calling itself ABC 6.

Early in the afternoon of May 4, 2005, WLNE's analog transmitter was knocked off the air due to a faulty section of transmission line on the tower. The transmitter had been running at 80% power due to another unrelated technical problem that occurred approximately two weeks earlier. Although Dish Network satellite and some cable systems continued to receive broadcasts through fiber optic connections, over-the-air and DirecTV satellite subscribers were left without a local ABC affiliate (DirecTV gets its signal via antenna). Some cable providers made special temporary arrangements to carry Boston ABC station WCVB during this outage. The WLNE transmitter was operational again late Thursday evening after 32 hours off the air.

=== Sale to Global Broadcasting ===
In August 2006, The Providence Journal reported that WLNE was put up for sale. The key reason for the decision was the lack of a second station for Freedom to operate in the market that would improve synergies for the Providence operation. On March 12, 2007, Freedom announced it was selling WLNE to Global Broadcasting, a Delaware corporation headed by Robinson Ewert and Kevin O'Brien. The FCC granted approval of this sale in mid-September and ownership was officially transferred on October 9. Freedom continued to operate WLNE's website until November 30, 2007, when control was shifted to Broadcast Interactive Media, and later WorldNow in April 2010. Global Broadcasting was not related to Canada's Global Television Network or its then-parent, Canwest Global Communications.

=== Financial struggles, bankruptcy ===
On June 23, NewsBlues reported that Global Broadcasting co-owner Robinson Ewert had left the company amidst a dispute with CBS over licensing fees for programs originating from its syndication unit. He was replaced by Rob Holtzer, general sales manager at Sunrise Sports and Entertainment, owner of the NHL's Florida Panthers and the BankAtlantic Center in Sunrise, Florida. He is also a former national sales manager at the YES Network in New York City. Holtzer's official title at Global was vice president and director of sales.

Global Broadcasting filed for receivership (Rhode Island's equivalent to bankruptcy) on July 29, 2010, due to declining advertising revenues. Providence attorney Matthew McGowan was appointed receiver. A month later, the station was put up for sale for the second time in four years. According to The Providence Journal, several groups had expressed interest in purchasing the station and a deal was projected to be reached by the end of the year. On December 13, 2010, rumors surfaced that A. H. Belo Corp. would buy WLNE and merge its operations with those of The Providence Journal—despite the fact that the company was formed from the split of non-broadcasting operations from Belo Corporation. Belo itself was considered a likelier candidate due to the strength of its operations in other regions, and its operation of regional news channels much like WLNE's own NewsChannel 5.

On February 10, 2011, Citadel Communications of Bronxville, New York, was chosen as the stalking horse bid in the sale of the station with a bid of $4 million. Five other groups (including one led by former Providence mayor Joseph Paolino, Jr.) were also interested in purchasing the station and had until March 18 to submit competing bids prior to auction. On March 17, ABC notified potential buyers that WLNE's affiliation with the network beyond March 31, 2011, was not assured, which Global Broadcasting CEO Kevin O'Brien said could depress the final price WLNE is sold for at auction. Some observers feared that this could prompt one or more of the six companies believed to be bidding for WLNE to withdraw from bidding for the station, which may have even forced it off the air if no sale was made.

=== Sale to Citadel Communications ===
On March 22, Citadel Communications was approved as the new owner of WLNE by receiver Matthew McGowan. The company met the approval of ABC, and took over station operation on May 1 under a local marketing agreement (LMA) with McGowan and Global, under the name Global Communications LLC, until the sale was approved by the FCC, at which point Citadel would assume full ownership. On April 5, WLNE revealed programming changes made in light of the sale, which included the return of CBS Television Distribution shows The Insider and Inside Edition. On April 25, veteran sales manager Chris Tzianabos was named vice president and general manager of WLNE, replacing Steve Doerr. Global CEO Kevin O'Brien tried to appeal the sale in court, arguing that attorney McGowan did not try hard enough to achieve a higher sale price for the station. However, he did not succeed in his efforts, and on June 1, it was announced that the FCC had approved the license transfer, therefore finalizing the acquisition.

In September 2011, as had been promised by Citadel upon its acquisition of the station, WLNE-TV began broadcasting newscasts and syndicated programming in full high-definition. The station additionally debuted a new circle logo and website design matching those of other Citadel stations, but incorporating its previous stylized 6.

After the sale of WOI-DT, WHBF-TV and KCAU-TV to the Nexstar Media Group was completed on March 13, 2014, WLNE and ABC affiliate KLKN in Lincoln, Nebraska, would become the only stations with a major network affiliation still owned by Citadel; the company also owned a news-intensive independent station, WSNN-LD (Suncoast News Network) in Sarasota, Florida, which was sold to Nexstar in 2023.

=== Later ownership changes ===
On May 16, 2019, it was announced that Standard Media, a company led by former Young Broadcasting and Media General executive Deb McDermott, would acquire WLNE and KLKN for $83 million. The sale was completed on September 5.

On September 12, 2025, Sinclair Broadcast Group—owner of WJAR—announced that it had acquired the non-license assets of WLNE and would take over its operations. The agreement resulted in the layoffs of multiple employees, including meteorologist Kelly Bates (who had originally joined the station in 2021 after departing WJAR amid a contract dispute).

On September 22, 2025, it was announced that Rincon Broadcasting Group would be buying the WLNE-TV license along with the other stations owned by Standard Media for $50 million; the sale was completed on February 27, 2026.

On December 1, 2025, the ABC affiliation and all of WLNE's main programming were moved to WJAR's second subchannel, with Roar, which formerly aired on WJAR-DT4, moving to WLNE's main channel. On January 12, 2026, WJAR-DT2 was rebranded from "ABC 6" to "Coastal ABC". As of January 2026, all of WLNE's station operations have been relocated from the Orms Building in downtown Providence to WJAR's studios in Cranston.

In March 2026, Community News Media LLC, which operates as Standard Media Group and is led by Soohyung Kim with Deborah McDermott as chief executive, agreed to acquire Rincon Broadcasting's stations, including WLNE-TV, for $116.5 million; the sale was completed on October 1.

== Programming ==
As an ABC affiliate, WLNE ran virtually the entire ABC programming schedule. Effective with the 1995 affiliation switch, Saturday morning infomercials were replaced with ABC's Saturday morning program block (currently Weekend Adventure; that block replaced ABC Kids in 2011).

=== Past programming preemptions and deferrals ===
As WTEV, the station moderately preempted ABC shows, in most every case a low-rated program. This did not pose as much of a problem, since most viewers could still get the full ABC schedule on Boston's WNAC until 1972, and on WCVB afterward. During the afternoon, WTEV ran cartoons and classic sitcoms, with late nights being devoted to movies.

Beginning in 1980, WLNE ran an afternoon movie from 4 to 6 p.m. By 1982, the station was also running a movie weekdays from 9 to 11 a.m. These movies were run under the Dialing For Dollars promotion and were hosted by George Allen for a decade. WLNE also continued to preempt moderate amounts of programming, particularly whatever game show CBS ran at 10 a.m. (to accommodate the morning movie), as well as late night programming. As a result of the preemptions, Child's Play, the 1983 version of Press Your Luck, and Blackout never aired on WLNE; the 1986 version of Card Sharks did not air on the station until late in the show's run. Other shows, such as Tattletales and Body Language were tape-delayed and aired in the noon slot, since WLNE did not have a noon news broadcast at that time. Providence area viewers could also watch the preempted shows via WNEV, which was available over-the-air on the Massachusetts side of the market. Throughout much of the 1980s, WLNE was known for running two movies a day.

By the fall of 1988, WLNE was only running an afternoon movie weekdays and began clearing CBS' 10 a.m. hour. In the fall of 1989, WLNE dropped CBS' Guiding Light, moving the movie to 3 p.m. and adding more syndicated programming in the 5 p.m. hour; by mid-1990, the afternoon movie was dropped in favor of additional syndicated programming. In the fall of 1990, WLNE dropped the CBS Saturday morning cartoons in favor of several movies in that time slot. In 1991, Guiding Light was reinstated. By 1993, the Saturday morning movies were replaced with educational children's programs and infomercials.

For many years, WLNE carried the syndicated shows Dr. Phil, Rachael Ray, Entertainment Tonight, The Insider, and Inside Edition from CBS Television Distribution. However, in mid-2009, the station was unable to reach a carriage agreement with the syndicator, successor to King World Productions and Paramount Domestic Television. At that time, the station was carrying Dr. Phil, Entertainment Tonight, and Inside Edition. As a result of the situation, the shows were dropped on June 5 and quickly moved to WNAC-TV. Temporarily put in their place were Cristina's Court, Family Court with Judge Penny, a 7 p.m. newscast, and Who Wants to Be a Millionaire. On June 16, CBS filed a lawsuit against Global Broadcasting for failing to fully pay license fees for the shows and a breach of contract. The syndicator sought $5 million from the company.

=== Local programming ===
The longest-running program on channel 6 was TV Mass from the Roman Catholic Diocese of Fall River, which began in 1963. Produced by WLNE, the show was originally aired Sundays at 8 a.m. It is normally taped at the chapel of Bishop Stang High School in Dartmouth, Massachusetts. Easter Mass and Christmas Mass are normally taped at St. Mary's Cathedral in Fall River, Massachusetts. As of 2011, the masses were independently produced and continued to air on WLNE, with the weekly mass at 11 a.m. on Sundays and the Easter and Christmas Mass at 11:30 a.m. and noon respectively. In December 2025, the Diocese of Fall River announced that it would discontinue the TV Mass at the end of the year. The final mass was broadcast on December 28, 2025.

Prior to its host's retirement, the longest running program on WLNE was The Truman Taylor Show. The Sunday morning public affairs program debuted very early in 1963. Numerous politicians appeared on the show, including two U.S. presidents. In late 2005, Truman Taylor taped his final show. He is now a featured op-ed columnist for the Providence Journal. In early 2006, ABC 6 News On the Record replaced Truman Taylor, with Jim Hummel hosting the program until his departure from the station in July 2008. Following his departure, On the Record was temporarily taken off-the-air and replaced with infomercials. The show returned in October 2008 with John DeLuca and former Providence mayor Buddy Cianci as co-hosts. Cianci would host the show solo from May 2011 until his death in January 2016. Another hiatus would follow.

On June 19, 2016, WLNE debuted In the Arena, with former Providence mayor Joe Paolino Jr. as host. The show initially consisted of a round table discussion with guest political analysts and Paolino as moderator. It has since evolved into a more traditional one-on-one interview with Paolino and a single guest. When ABC programming moved from WLNE to WJAR channel 10.2, In the Arena moved as well. The show's title is a reference to a passage in President Theodore Roosevelt's Citizenship in a Republic speech about "The Man in the Arena".

WLNE had been the market home of The Jerry Lewis MDA Labor Day Telethon since 1993. As WTEV, it was one of the first affiliates of the "Love Network" when it was formed in 1968. Local segments had been broadcast from the Warwick Mall for several years. In 2007, the telethon relocated to the Marriott hotel in downtown Providence. In 2008, the telethon was broadcast from Twin River Casino in Lincoln. Local segments continued to be broadcast from Twin River until 2012, when the telethon became the MDA Show of Strength. The following year, the show began being televised over one national network (ABC) and the local segments were discontinued. The final Show of Strength was broadcast in 2014.

WLNE became the first station in Rhode Island to broadcast a local program in high-definition when it aired Bristol's 4th of July Parade in 2008 live with production facilities provided by Comcast. In 2009, the station won an Emmy Award for its pre-parade special, Reflections of the Fourth: Celebrating Bristol, from the Boston/New England chapter of the National Academy of Television Arts and Sciences. The parade was not broadcast in 2011 amidst the change in station ownership, but would return in 2012. WLNE had carried the parade from 2006 until 2021.

=== Caught in Providence ===
Caught in Providence is a reality court show presided over by Judge Frank Caprio. The program showcases the proceedings inside Providence Municipal Court. Produced and directed by Judge Caprio's brother Joseph and his company Citylife Productions, the program originated on PEG access television in Rhode Island and was first picked up by WLNE in 2000, initially airing in late night on Saturdays. Following a hiatus, Caught in Providence returned in 2015 and aired following the 11 p.m. newscasts on Saturdays until September 2017. It was during this run that the program went viral. Several clips began appearing on social media, garnering millions of views. The program has also received coverage from media organizations around the world, such as NBC News.

In December 2017, it was announced that Debmar-Mercury had picked up Caught in Providence for daily national syndication, this as clips from the program eclipsed one billion views. The program was initially sold to the Fox Television Stations group and debuted nationally on September 24, 2018. Locally, the program aired in Providence on CW affiliate WNAC-DT2 and in Boston on CW affiliate WLVI. The show ran for two seasons.

=== News operation ===
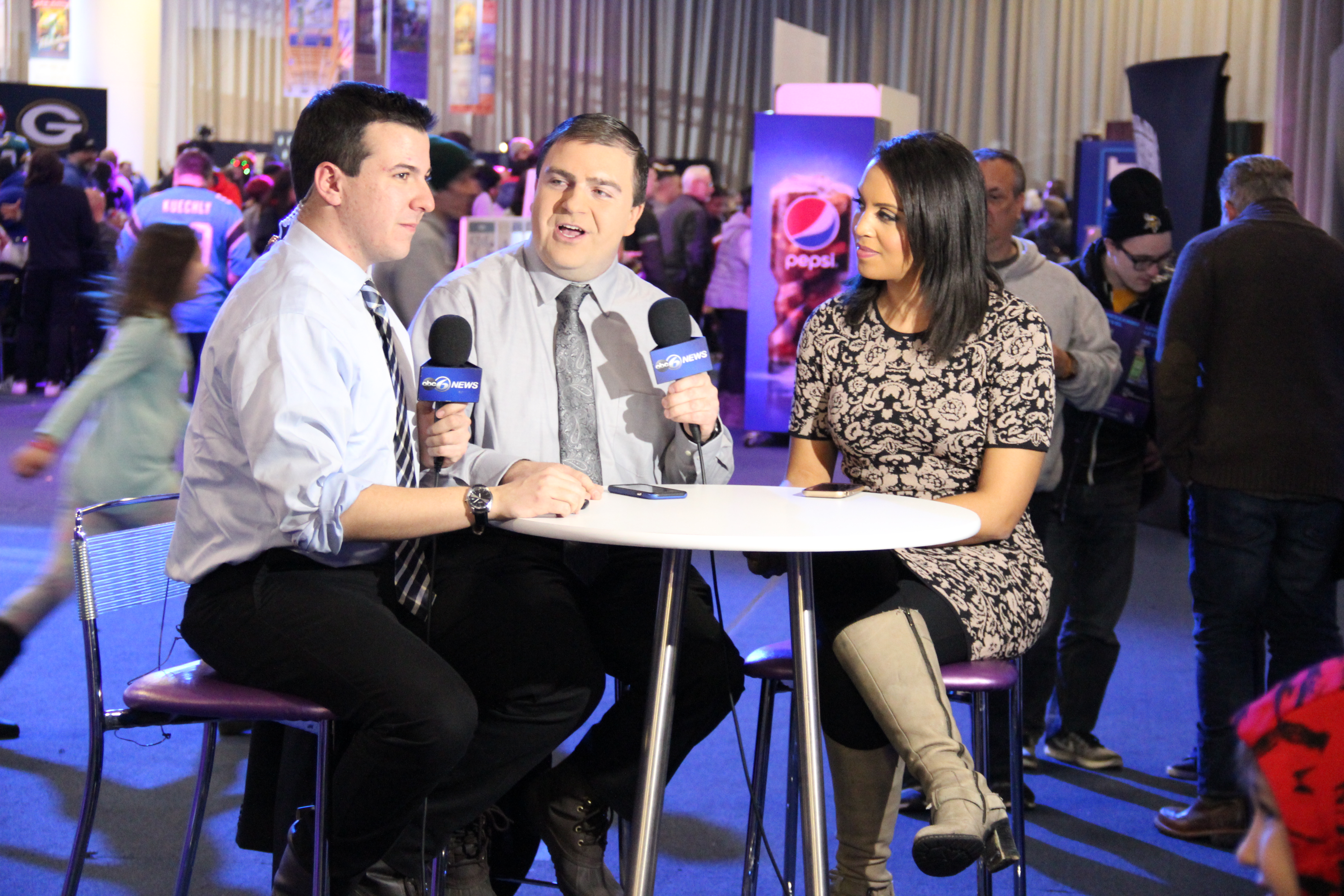
WLNE reporters at the Super Bowl Experience in Minnesota for Super Bowl LII.

From its inception in 1963 through November 30, 2025, local news was continuously broadcast on the WLNE channel 6 signal. As of December 1, 2025, when "ABC 6" programming moved to WJAR-DT2, the local newscasts went along with it. Initially, these newscasts continued to use the "ABC 6" branding and were produced from WLNE's Providence studios by its own in-house staff, with weather and sports reports provided by WJAR. "NBC 10" news talent filled in for "ABC 6" anchors when the latter was unavailable. This practice continued until January 9, 2026. On January 10, "ABC 6"'s social media pages were updated to the "Coastal ABC" name and logo. Also on this date, WJAR-DT2 began simulcasting "NBC 10" newscasts. On January 12, it was announced that "Coastal ABC" would officially launch on-air on January 19, with its own newscasts produced from WJAR's studios in Cranston.

For most of its history, WLNE had placed a distant third in the market when it broadcast local news, behind WJAR and WPRI. The station had been known for numerous turnovers in format, talent and management over the years for the purpose of increasing its newscast ratings and sales revenue, all having little or no effect. Under Global Broadcasting's ownership, changes in image and news coverage resulted in a marginal ratings increase and for a time, ABC 6 News was promoted as "New England's Fastest Growing News". The ratings surge did not last for long. However, on March 29, 2011, WLNE scored its first late news victory in years, finishing number one at 11 p.m. following the series premiere of network medical drama Body of Proof, which was filmed entirely in Rhode Island for its first season.

On October 24, 2007, WLNE announced that infamous former Providence mayor and WPRO personality Vincent "Buddy" Cianci would join the station as chief political analyst and contributing editor starting on November 1. Cianci was a political analyst at WLNE in the late 1980s. As part of his duties at the station, he moderated a daily segment on ABC 6 News. It was first entitled Your Attention Please and was co-moderated in-studio by former chief reporter Jim Hummel. Following Hummel's departure from the station in July 2008, it was changed to Buddy TV and weeknight anchor John DeLuca became co-moderator. The segment aired live during the former ABC 6 News First at Four with Cianci first appearing in-studio and then from the East Providence studios of WPRO, where the segment was simulcast during his weekday show that aired from 2 p.m. to 6 p.m. In October 2008, he started co-hosting the Sunday morning public affairs program ABC 6 News On the Record with DeLuca.

With the change in station ownership in May 2011, the segment name was changed to The World According to Buddy with a solo Cianci in the ABC 6 studios. The segment was taped live during the noon newscasts and re-aired during the 5 p.m. news. He also became a solo host of On the Record. On June 25, 2014, Cianci announced that he would be seeking a third term as mayor of Providence as an independent candidate. As a result, he had to step down from his position at WLNE as well as WPRO for the duration of the campaign. Former chief political reporter Mark Curtis took over as host of the program while Cianci campaigned for office. Cianci lost the bid to Democrat Jorge Elorza and returned to his previous positions shortly after the 2014 general elections.

On January 27, 2016, Cianci was taken from the WLNE studios to Miriam Hospital after falling ill during the taping of On the Record and was pronounced dead on January 28 at age 74. The episode did not make air, with a special on Cianci airing in its place on January 31. The Sunday morning public affairs program was then put on hiatus until June 2016 when In the Arena with Joe Paolino debuted.

On December 17, 2007, WLNE announced it would launch ABC 6 News First at Four, the market's first-ever 4 p.m. news on January 14, 2008. Described as a "hard newscast" and not morning-show style fluff, First at Four gave WLNE a head start in coverage of weather and politics. The hour-long newscast aired for just over three years and competed head to head with The Oprah Winfrey Show airing on WJAR. First at Four last aired in April 2011 prior to the sale of the station to Citadel. In March 2020, under Standard Media, WLNE began airing a special half-hour 4 p.m. newscast with extended coverage of the COVID-19 pandemic. This newscast became a regular part of the schedule on April 13, 2020, and the First at Four title was revived.

In May 2009, WLNE launched a 10 p.m. newscast on Sunday mornings. Previously, it had only produced weekend morning newscasts for NewsChannel 5. It was the only Providence station with a local news broadcast airing at that time. In May 2011, Citadel moved the newscast to 7:30 a.m. and added Saturday morning broadcasts in addition to Sunday mornings. The weekend morning newscasts were cancelled in 2012.

In June 2009, the station launched the market's first (since the 1980s) 7 p.m. newscast on weeknights, filling the spot vacated by Entertainment Tonight, which was taken off the schedule due to the station's dispute with CBS Television Distribution. In March 2011, this newscast was replaced with infomercials, with the newscast airing only in the event they could not sell the time slot on a given day. After the station's sale to Citadel, this newscast was officially replaced with syndicated programming the following month.

On April 5, 2011, WLNE announced a new programming lineup that included the addition of a 5 p.m. newscast on April 25. The station then began to shift towards video journalism, and all remaining reporters and future hires were required to be one-person bands. On September 13, WLNE became the second station in the market to broadcast news in high-definition, behind WJAR and just a week ahead of WPRI/WNAC. Along with the transition came a standardized graphics package used by other Citadel stations. The station received the company's standardized news set in August 2012.

In weather segments, WLNE uses live regional radar from the National Weather Service local office in Taunton, Massachusetts, along with high-resolution satellite. The segments are presented on-air under the Stormtracker label. From 2012 to 2017, the Stormtracker Weather Team was certified as providing Southern New England's most accurate forecast by WeatheRate, an independent weather research firm. On July 19, 2012, WLNE became the first station in Southern New England to be recognized as StormReady by the National Weather Service.

WLNE won the Massachusetts/Rhode Island Associated Press News Station of the Year award four years in a row from 1997 to 2000 and again in 2002. The station also won a regional Edward R. Murrow Award for Investigative Reporting two consecutive years.

Due to its coverage area overlapping with Boston's ABC affiliate WCVB, the two stations shared resources for coverage of southeastern Massachusetts.

==== NewsChannel 5 ====
NewsChannel 5, formerly known as the Rhode Island News Channel (RINC), began broadcasting on November 30, 1998. Operated by WLNE (until 2012) and Cox Communications, it was the first and only 24-hour local news channel in the state. It provided non-stop news 24 hours a day, seven days a week, mainly consisting of rebroadcasts of news that aired on WLNE. The station could only be found on Cox Cable channel 5 in Rhode Island. NewsChannel 5 also provided live, continuing coverage of breaking news and other events. When severe weather struck, the WLNE weather team provided up to the minute forecasts.

Prior to Citadel Communications' acquisition of WLNE, there were three live newscasts that aired exclusively on NewsChannel 5. From its launch, a weekend morning newscast was seen exclusively on the station. As of May 2011, this newscast was also broadcast on the main channel. On September 29, 2008, WLNE began offering an extra hour of local news on weekday mornings at 7 a.m. An extended hour of Good Morning Providence was one of two 7 p.m. local newscasts in the market, the other being an extended hour of WPRI's Eyewitness News This Morning on WNAC-TV. This newscast was no longer broadcast as of May 2011. WLNE occasionally aired a 10 p.m. newscast during major news events or when sports programming preempted the 10 p.m. news on competitor WNAC. As of May 2011, this newscast no longer aired.

For a brief period in September 2009, an audio feed of NewsChannel 5 was broadcast on radio station WALE in various timeslots; this included a start-to-finish simulcast of the Jerry Lewis MDA Telethon. On February 1, 2012, WLNE's affiliation with Cox channel 5 ended, and its programming on the channel was replaced with WJAR programming and its name was changed to Ocean State Networks (OSN). In April 2024, Cox ended its news-share agreement with WJAR and the channel was shut down.

==== Notable former on-air staff ====
- Alisyn Camerota
- Steve Cascione
- Buddy Cianci
- Walter Cryan
- Mark Curtis
- Gail Huff
- Gene Lavanchy
- Joseph R. Paolino Jr.
- Truman Taylor
- Kristen Welker
- Chuck Wilson

== Technical information ==
=== Subchannels ===
The station's signal is multiplexed:

Subchannels of WLNE-TV
Subchannel	Res.	Short name	Programming
6.1	720p	WLNE-DT	Roar
6.2	480i	Grit	Grit
6.3	480i	ION	Ion Mystery
6.5	720p	MeTV	MeTV

The station's analog video broadcast at a frequency of 83.26 MHz AM. The station's analog audio was aired at a frequency of 87.76 MHz FM. Both frequencies were +10 kHz shift from the center channel 6 frequency to prevent interference with other stations on channel 6 (as stated above). WLNE's analog audio could be picked up on the lower end of the dial on most FM radios at 87.7 MHz. WLNE regularly mentioned this additional way of coverage. This was true of all analog channel 6 stations in the United States. After February 17, 2009, channel 6 audio on WLNE was no longer available on the radio. (It was still available on most other full-powered channel 6 stations in the United States through June 12.)

=== Analog-to-digital conversion ===
WLNE-TV ended regular programming on its analog signal, over VHF channel 6, on February 17, 2009, the original date when full-power television stations in the United States were to transition from analog to digital broadcasts under federal mandate (which was later pushed back to June 12, 2009). The station's digital signal remained on its pre-transition UHF channel 49, using virtual channel 6. It offered a nightlighting service on its analog signal for 60 days following the shutdown. The station aired a looping DTV education program as well as all of its newscasts. Due to this service being broadcast on analog channel 6, audio was still available on 87.7 FM when this period ended.

On January 16, 2012, WLNE, along with all Citadel stations, began carrying Disney-ABC's Live Well Network on its digital subchannel (6.2). The network was also seen on Cox digital channel 803, Verizon FiOS digital channel 466, Full Channel digital channel 196, and Comcast digital channel 296. Prior to this date, the station did not carry an additional network but simulcast its main programming in Standard-definition television (SDTV) on 6.2. On August 18, 2014, ahead of the discontinuation of Live Well Network in January, WLNE replaced it with two new multicast networks, Grit and Escape. On May 8, 2019, the station added the relaunched Court TV to a third subchannel. Escape was rebranded as Court TV Mystery on September 30, 2019, and again as Ion Mystery on February 24, 2022.

WLNE's digital signal operates at 294,000 watts—equivalent to 1.47 million watts for an analog transmitter. Still, due to the fact it now operates from Rehoboth with the other major Rhode Island stations, it has a signal comparable to WJAR and WPRI for the first time ever.
