= Mark Curtis (broadcaster) =

American journalist

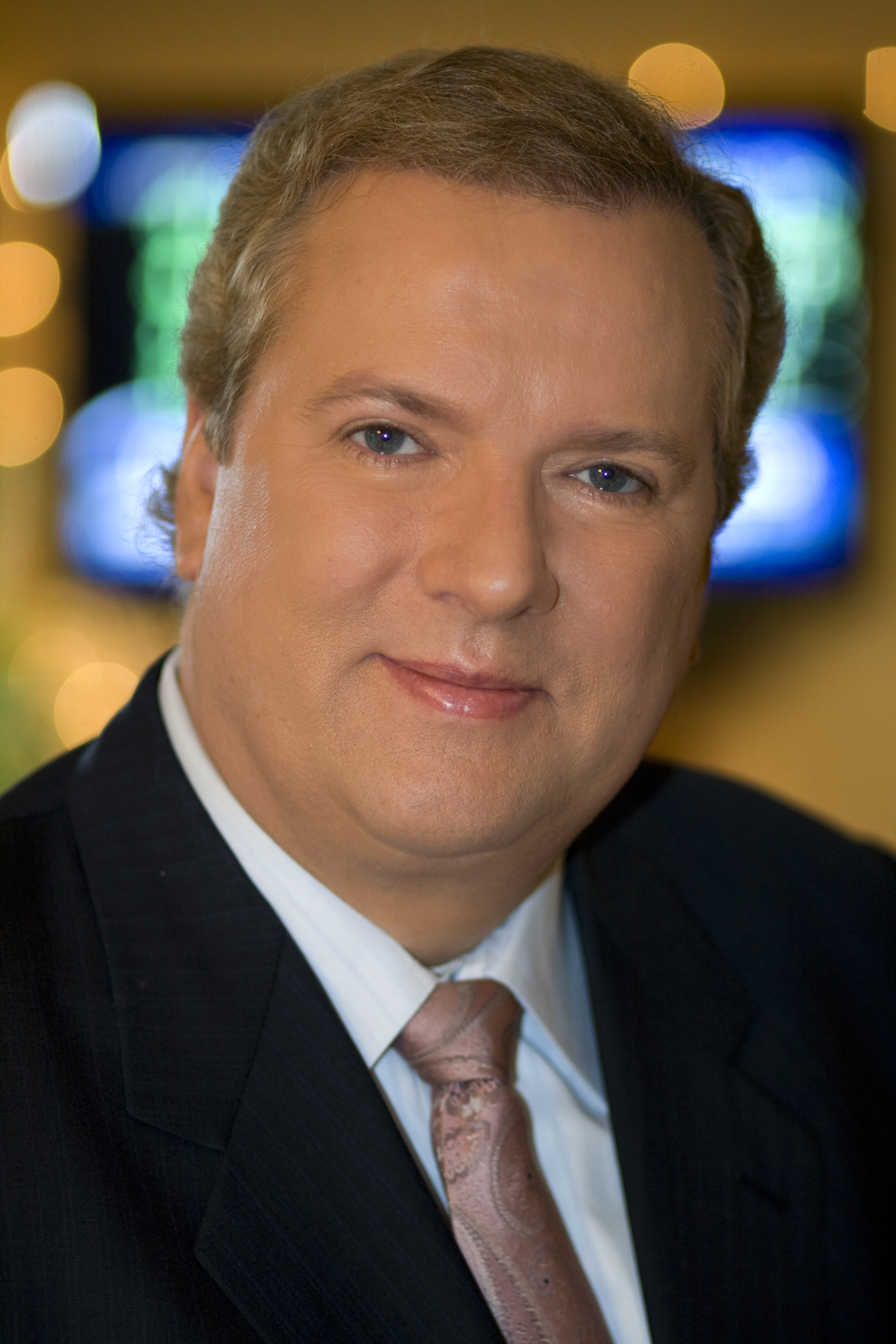
- Born: 1959 (age 66–67); Milwaukee, Wisconsin
- Education: Marquette University, University of Florida, Saint Mary's of California
- Occupation: Broadcast Journalist
- Children: Alexandra Curtis, Patrick Curtis
- Website: www.markcurtismedia.com/about/mark-curtis-0

Mark Corrigan Curtis is an American broadcast journalist, author and political analyst. He is currently Chief Political Reporter for the Nexstar Media Group stations in West Virginia.

== Early life ==
Curtis was born in 1959 in Milwaukee, Wisconsin. Curtis is the son of the late Dr. William C. Curtis, M.D., a prominent Milwaukee physician and the late Mary Beth Curtis. He is the middle of seven children.

He has lived in many parts of the USA, including Wisconsin, Florida, Washington, D.C., and was an active community member of Danville, California for 11 years.

== Early career ==
Curtis is a former stand-up comedian who once worked with political comedian and fellow Milwaukee native Will Durst. Both men now work and live in the San Francisco Bay Area, and still collaborate.

Curtis was also a professional musician in the late 1970s and early 1980, touring the Midwest "bar band" circuit with "The Strays", "Mike and the Mysteries", and "Fat Tuesday". He was also employed by jingle writer Terry Sweet.

He got his first paid "radio" job, dispatching police and fire calls for the Village of Elm Grove, Wisconsin. At the age of 19, he became a disc jockey and later Program Director for WMUR-AM radio at Marquette University. While at WMUR Radio he co-hosted the "Bob and Mark Show" with fellow student Bob Odenkirk, now of Breaking Bad and Better Call Saul.

== Journalism career ==
Curtis began his broadcast news career in Florida, working at WRUF-AM/FM Radio and WUFT-TV5 (PBS) in Gainesville and WCJB-TV 20 (ABC) in Ocala. He became a nationally known journalist in 1987, when he was at WEAR-TV 3 (ABC) in Pensacola. He won numerous awards, between 1989 and 1992, for his five-years of coverage in what came to be known as the Gulf Breeze UFO Sightings. His work appeared on NBC's Unsolved Mysteries with Robert Stack, A Current Affair and in Time-Life Books. In 1991 the Committee for Skeptical Inquiry (CSICOP) awarded Curtis the Responsibility in Journalism Award for the Gulf Breeze incident, exposing trick photography.

Curtis is one of a select group of national reporters who have spent time working in Congress. He served as a Legislative Aide and Congressional Fellow through the American Political Science Association, in the offices of Rep. Charles Schumer (D-NY) and Sen. Herb Kohl, (D-WI), 1992-93.

Curtis is perhaps best known for the 15 years he spent with KTVU-TV2, the former Cox Media Group station and FOX affiliate in the San Francisco Bay Area. He served as Chief Washington, D.C. Correspondent for Cox-owned stations from 1993 to 1999, Morning News co-anchor from 1999 to 2007 and a freelance reporter and political analyst through the balance of the 2008 campaign as he traveled from Iowa and New Hampshire in January, through the entire primary season ending in South Dakota and Montana in June. He also covered both political conventions for KTVU. He was also a host of Comcast Newsmakers in the Bay Area.

In January 2010, Curtis joined WLNE-TV ABC6 in Providence, Rhode Island as the weekend evening news anchor and Chief Political Reporter. He would go on to anchor the ABC affiliate's weekday morning and 5 o'clock weeknight newscasts. He was also a substitute host for the weekend public affairs program ABC6 News On the Record, hosted by former Providence mayor and the station's chief political analyst Vincent "Buddy" Cianci. During his time at ABC6, Curtis covered many events surrounding the 2012 U.S. presidential election, including the Republican National Convention in Tampa, Florida and the Democratic National Convention in Charlotte, North Carolina. He also served as a correspondent for all of WLNE owner Citadel Communications' stations (WOI-DT in Des Moines, Iowa, WHBF-TV in Rock Island, Illinois, KLKN in Lincoln, Nebraska and KCAU-TV in Sioux City, Iowa) while covering the conventions. Curtis left WLNE in March 2015. Before leaving Rhode Island, he appeared as a panelist on two episodes of the public affairs program A Lively Experiment on WSBE-TV Rhode Island PBS.

In October 2015, Curtis joined West Virginia Media Holdings as Chief Political Reporter. Based at WOWK-TV in Charleston, he reports for the CBS affiliate as well as the group's other stations (CBS affiliates WTRF-TV in Wheeling, WVNS-TV in Bluefield/Beckley and NBC affiliate WBOY-TV in Clarksburg). He also contributes to the company's weekly newspaper, the State Journal, in addition to all company internet platforms. In November 2015, West Virginia Media Holdings announced that it was selling its stations to the Nexstar Broadcasting Group (now better known as Nexstar Media Group). Curtis would continue on with the group.

Curtis continues to be a regular political contributor on KGO-AM 810 and KGO-TV in San Francisco. He also has contributed occasionally on KQED-TV 9, KPIX-TV5, and KRON-TV4 in San Francisco, as well as KTXL-TV Fox 40 News in Sacramento and KTLA-TV5 in Los Angeles. He is also an occasional newspaper reporter, covering the Inauguration in Washington, D.C. for the Danville Weekly and Pleasanton Weekly in California, as well as writing for his own blog, which includes his weekly political column, "The Sunday Political Brunch." He is now a National Contributing Writer on politics for Patch.com Patch - Everything Local: Breaking News, Events, Discussions

== Writing career ==
In January 2009, Curtis published his first book; a first-person account of the historic 2008 Presidential campaign. "Age of Obama: A Reporter's Journey with Clinton, McCain and Obama in the Making of the President 2008" was released by Nimble Books, LLC. on January 20, 2009, coinciding with the Inauguration of Barack Obama. In 2010, the book won an International Book Award in the Current Events: Political/Social category and was a finalist in the Non-Fiction Narrative category.

== Education ==
Curtis holds a B.A. in Broadcast Communication from Marquette University (1981); an A.S. in Computer Studies from the Community College of Rhode Island (2016); an M.A. in Mass Communication from the University of Florida (1986); and an Ed.D. in Educational Leadership from St. Mary's College of California in Moraga, California (2012). He has guest lectured at many universities and is currently an adjunct lecturer in communication at Rhode Island College. He also received a BS in Computer Studies from The Community College of Rhode Island in August 2016.
