= Canyon Kid's Corner =

American children's TV show, 1953–1985

- Genre: children's program
- Starring: Jim Henry
- Country of origin: United States
- No. of seasons: 32

Production
- Running time: 30 minutes (with commercials)
- Production company: KCAU-TV

Original release
- Release: March 30, 1953 – November 1985

Canyon Kid's Corner is an American live children's television series that aired on KCAU-TV in Sioux City, Iowa, from 1953 to 1985. The show was one of the two pioneers of children's programming in Iowa.

== Format ==
Canyon Kid's Corner was hosted by Jim Henry, who worked on the show for 32 years; Henry once explained that the show was intended as both entertainment and instruction for children, teaching them to "get some sense of how to live right" through principles like respecting one's parents and kindness to one's friends. Anywhere from 15 to 20 children would be featured live on the show. During the show's first month, Henry wore a cowboy hat and a tie. Though he played a cowboy, Henry had a Brooklyn accent; he explained to the children that the accent came from "the canyons created by the tall buildings in New York City". Children in Sioux City often appeared on Canyon Kid's Corner for their birthday; sometimes they came on the show with friends or Scout troopmates, and each Tuesday would feature the pets of the show's guests. Canyon Kid's Corner held a drawing contest every Wednesday, and children would give performances every Thursday in dance, song, and music.

== Production ==
Jim Henry was from Brooklyn; he moved to Sioux City after he was stationed there during World War II. Canyon Kid's Corner began airing as part of KVTV's original lineup, on March 29, 1953. (Note: KVTV began broadcasting on March 29, not March 28 as stated in the article.) The producers wanted a host for a children's television series. Henry wanted the show to be similar to a club for children that would normally be in someone's backyard. Henry auditioned for the role in cowboy-like clothing and he came up with the name Canyon Kid. Despite KVTV liking Henry's audition, the producers wanted a better name for the show, although the name was never changed for the entire 32-year run. Henry said,

In television's early years...there was no difference between local television and network television...I mean, you were on television...and it didn't make any difference if you were coming from New York or from Sioux City. Whatever it was, they were impressed.

Originally a daily afternoon show, it was moved to 7:30 a.m. when KVTV (by then known as KCAU-TV) sought to increase the audience of its early evening newscasts by airing The Mike Douglas Show. By 1978, it was airing weekly on Sundays at noon. Throughout the show's entire run, around 75,000 children appeared as guests; it was considered a pioneer of children's programming in Iowa alongside The Magic Window. The show helped launch the career of musician Tommy Bolin. In November 1985, KCAU-TV was sold to Citadel Communications; Canyon Kid's Corner was axed after Henry—who also doubled as the station's promotions manager—was fired, along with 21 other staffers, as part of a house-cleaning effort by the new ownership. Canyon Kid's recognized vest was hung at a Sioux City Applebee's restaurant, while Henry went on to become an insurance agent.

Following Henry's death in February 2014 at 89, the Orpheum Theatre in Sioux City held a tribute to Henry on their marquee due to his role in shaping the show.
