= Global Broadcasting =

American television broadcasting company

Global Broadcasting LLC.
- Company type: Private, LLC; Delaware
- Industry: Broadcast Television; Television Production
- Founded: 2007
- Defunct: 2011
- Fate: receivership, property acquired by Citadel Communications
- Headquarters: San Francisco, California; Providence, Rhode Island
- Area served: Rhode Island; Massachusetts
- Key people: Kevin O'Brien, President & CEO; Robinson Ewert, Vice President (2007-2009); Rob Holtzer, Vice President & Director of Sales; Matthew McGowan, Receiver
- Products: Broadcast television

Global Broadcasting LLC. was a private broadcasting company in the United States. Global was a Delaware corporation based in San Francisco, California, and Providence, Rhode Island, and was founded by Kevin O'Brien and Robinson Ewert. Founded in early 2007, Global owned WLNE-TV, the ABC affiliate in Providence from 2007 to 2011. This was the company's first and only television station, purchased from Irvine, California-based Freedom Communications in 2007, who previously owned WLNE since 1983. The owners of Global Broadcasting planned to expand into other regions of the country; however, they were unable to acquire any additional stations.

== History ==
When Global took over WLNE, they initiated a major overhaul on the station's lagging news operation. They began by updating the station's logo and constructing a new set. They also introduced new faces in talent and management from around the country. Steve Doerr, a former NBC News executive, was named vice president and general manager. Infamous former Providence mayor Vincent "Buddy" Cianci was brought on as Chief Political Analyst. Allison Alexander was hired from WOIO in Cleveland, Ohio, as the new main anchor. Also, anchor/reporter Paul Mueller and veteran meteorologist Steve Cascione returned to the station.

There was also an increase in the hours of news per week. On January 14, 2008, WLNE launched ABC6 News First At Four, the market's first 4 o'clock newscast. It also featured the market's only 3-person anchor team of Allison Alexander, Melissa Mahan, and Paul Mueller, which was later cut down to 2. With the departure of Chief Meteorologist Mark Searles to WJAR, morning/noon meteorologist Fred Campagna was promoted to Chief, with Steve Cascione taking his place on the renamed Good Morning Providence, which was increased from 1 hour to 2, plus an extra hour on NewsChannel 5, formerly the Rhode Island News Channel (RINC), available only on Cox Cable systems in Rhode Island. Morning anchor John DeLuca was also promoted to co-anchor of the 6 and 11 o'clock newscasts with Alexander. The station's corner "bug" was updated to include time and temperature and a news ticker was added to newscasts. In April 2008, new updated graphics were introduced, a music package from 615 Music began being used, and Bill Ratner was added as station voiceover.

Ratings steadily increased. WLNE promoted its news as "New England's Fastest Growing News" and put more emphasis on hard news coverage and feature reporting than ever before. Some argued that the station was putting too much sensationalism in its news, which was a key factor in Chief Reporter Jim Hummel's decision to leave the station in July 2008 after over a decade with the station. In 2009, the station launched a 10 o'clock Sunday morning newscast in May and a 7 o'clock weeknight newscast in June. They also occasionally aired a 10 o'clock newscast on NewsChannel 5 on nights when sports or other special programming pre-empted the 10 o'clock news on WNAC. At its peak, the station was offering 37 hours of news per week on both ABC6 and NewsChannel 5.

=== Dispute with CBS Television Distribution ===
For many years, WLNE carried the syndicated shows Dr. Phil, Rachael Ray, Entertainment Tonight, The Insider, and Inside Edition from CBS Television Distribution. However, in mid-2009, the station was unable to reach a carriage agreement with the syndicator, formerly known as King World. At that time, the station was carrying Dr. Phil, Entertainment Tonight, and Inside Edition. As a result of the situation, the shows were dropped on June 5 and quickly moved to WNAC. Temporarily put in their place were Cristina's Court, Family Court with Judge Penny, and Who Wants To Be A Millionaire. On June 16, CBS filed a lawsuit against Global Broadcasting for failing to fully pay license fees for the shows and a breach of contract. The syndicator sought $5 million from the company.

On June 23, NewsBlues reported that Global Broadcasting co-owner Robinson Ewert had left the company amidst the dispute with CBS. He was replaced by Rob Holtzer, general sales manager at Sunrise Sports and Entertainment, owner of the NHL's Florida Panthers and the BankAtlantic Center in Sunrise, Florida. He is also a former national sales manager at the YES Network in New York.

=== Receivership ===
Global Broadcasting filed for receivership (Rhode Island's equivalent to bankruptcy) on July 29, 2010 due to declining advertising revenues. Providence attorney Matthew McGowan was appointed receiver. A month later, the station was put up for sale for the second time in four years. According to The Providence Journal, several groups had expressed interest in purchasing the station and a deal was projected to be reached by the end of the year. On December 13, 2010, rumors surfaced that WLNE would be acquired by A.H. Belo Corp., and that its operations would be merged with those of The Providence Journal. However, it was also noted that A.H. Belo Corp. was formed by the spin-off of the non-broadcasting assets of Belo Corporation. Belo itself was considered a likelier candidate due to the strength of its operations in southern and western markets, and its operation of regional news channels much like WLNE's own Newschannel 5.

=== Sale of WLNE, Demise ===
On February 10, 2011, Citadel Communications of Bronxville, New York, was chosen as the stalking horse bid in the sale of the station with a bid of $4 million. Five other groups (including one led by former Providence mayor Joseph Paolino) were also interested in purchasing the station and had until March 18 to submit competing bids prior to auction. On March 17, ABC notified potential buyers that WLNE's affiliation with the network beyond March 31, 2011 is not assured, which Global Broadcasting CEO Kevin O'Brien said could depress the final price WLNE is sold for at auction. Some observers feared that this could prompt one or more of the six companies believed to be bidding for WLNE to withdraw from bidding for the station, which may even force it off the air if no sale is made. On March 22, Citadel Communications was approved as the new owner of WLNE by receiver Matthew McGowan. The company met the approval of ABC and took over station operation on May 1 under a local marketing agreement (LMA) with McGowan and Global as Global Communications LLC. until the sale was approved by the Federal Communications Commission (FCC), at which point Citadel would assume full ownership. Citadel is unrelated to the former Citadel Broadcasting Corporation, which owned several radio stations in the Providence market before being acquired by Cumulus Media in 2011.

CEO Kevin O'Brien tried to appeal the sale of WLNE in court, arguing that attorney McGowan did not try hard enough to achieve a higher sale price for WLNE. However, he did not succeed in his efforts, and on June 1, it was announced that the FCC had approved the license transfer, therefore finalizing the acquisition.

Global Broadcasting was not related to a Canadian network, the Global Television Network, or its parent, Canwest Global Communications.
