= Cascione =

Cascione is an Italian surname. Notable people with the surname include:

- Donato Cascione (born 1949), Italian poet and writer
- Emmanuel Cascione (born 1983), Italian footballer and coach
- Felice Cascione (1918–1944) Italian doctor, partisan, author of "Fischia il vento"
- Steve Cascione (born 1954), American television meteorologist
