= Silver plan =

Silver plan may refer to:

- An offering of the United States' Patient Protection and Affordable Care Act defined as covering 70 percent of out-of-pocket costs
  - That offering as qualifying a household for cost-sharing subsidies under Affordable Care Act tax provisions
  - That offering as basis for calculation of a premium tax credit
  - A proposed offering of the un-passed 2009 House Bill 3962, known as the Affordable Health Care for America Act
- A digital phone plan by Full Channel
- A meal plan offered by the College of Saint Rose
- An affiliation level launched in May 2009 by NBCUniversal Television Group
