= Global Television =

Global Television or Global TV may refer to:

- Global Television Network, a major English-language television network in Canada
  - CanWest Global, its former corporate owner
  - Global News, its news division
- Global Television (Australia), a television production company
- Global TV (T&T), a television station in Trinidad and Tobago
- Global TV (Venezuela), a regional television station serving the state of Zulia
- Global News Network, a news channel in the Philippines shown on the Global Destiny Cable line up
- GTV (Indonesia), formerly Global TV, a television network
- Global Television (Bangladeshi TV channel)
- Red TV (Peru), formerly Global Televisión, a television network

== See also ==
- China Global Television Network, a government-owned broadcaster based in China
- Global Broadcasting, a television broadcaster based in Rhode Island
- Rede Globo, a television network in Brazil
