= Chuck Wilson (sports journalist) =

American sports interviewer and reporter

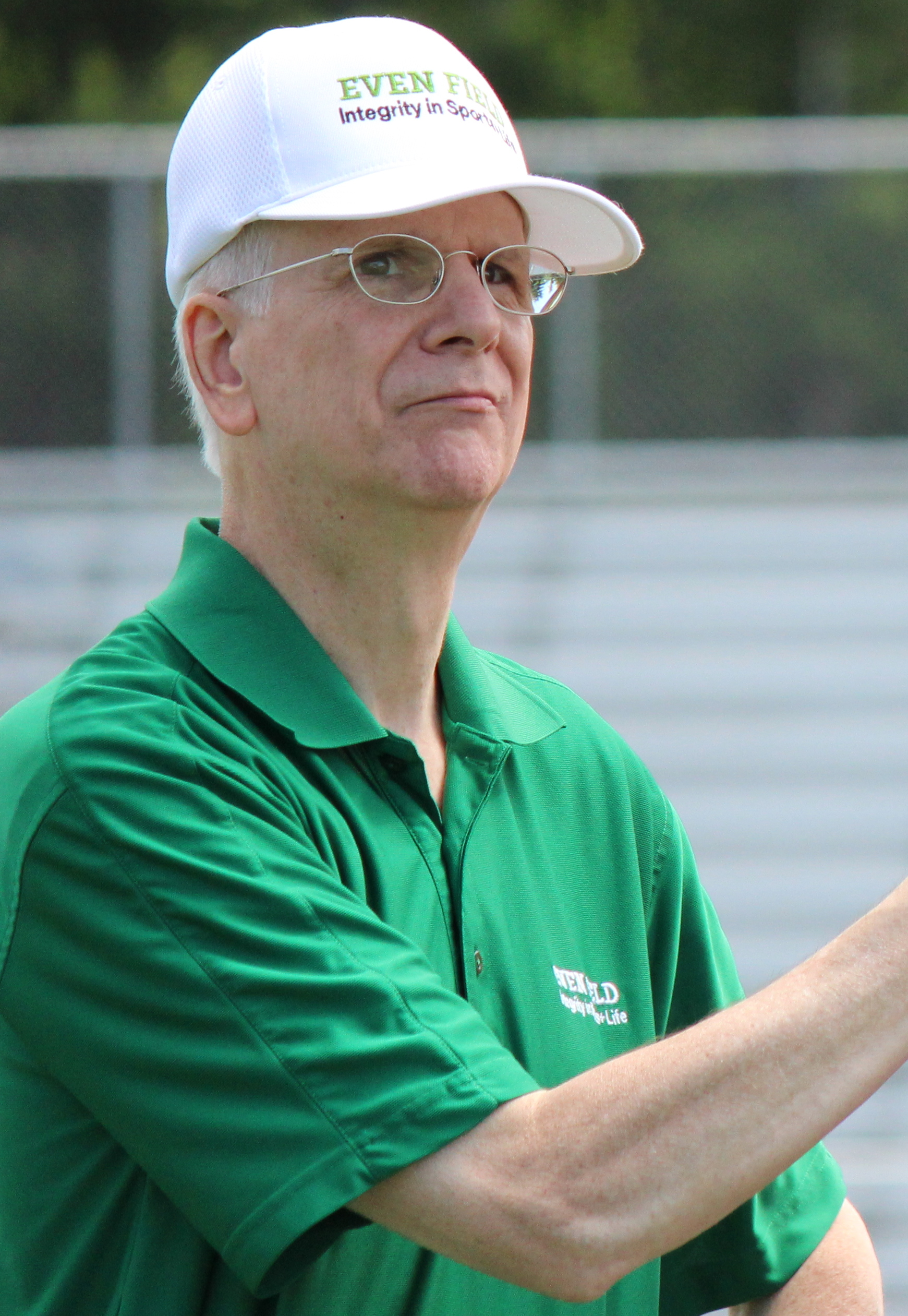
- Wilson in 2015
- Born: February 8, 1954 (age 72); Massachusetts, United States
- Education: Ithaca College
- Occupations: Sports journalist Radio host
- Years active: 1976–present

Chuck Wilson (born February 8, 1954) is an American interviewer, reporter and sports talk radio host. Wilson was an original host when the ESPN Radio Network debuted on January 4, 1992, and has 20 years experience on national radio, including close to 17 years at ESPN. In December 2009, Sports Illustrated.com named Wilson runner-up for "Best National Sports Radio Host" of the decade.

Wilson is the founder and director of Even Field, a nonprofit organization that promotes character through sports. In 2007, Wilson was named one of the "100 Most Influential Sports Educators in America" by the Institute for International Sport.

== Early life ==
Wilson was born on February 8, 1954, in Massachusetts, the youngest of three sons of the late Eleanor and the late Melvin Wilson, who was a physicist and a national authority on the aurora borealis (known as the northern lights).

Wilson grew up in Massachusetts and Rhode Island and attended Lawrence Academy in Groton, Massachusetts. He lettered in football, basketball and golf. Wilson graduated in 1972 and then attended Ithaca College. In 1993, he was named a Sports Ethics Fellow by the Institute for International Sport. From 2001 to 2006, he served on the advisory panel for the Center for Sports Parenting. Chuck and his wife Nancee have three sons.

== Career ==
=== Early radio/TV career in Rochester, New York ===
Wilson's broadcast career began in January 1976 at WBBF radio in Rochester, New York. When the station's FM sister station changed its format to all-news as WNWZ, Wilson co-anchored afternoon drive for the NBC "News and Information" affiliate. He later was named sports director, delivering 16-sports updates, six nights per week. When NBC pulled the plug on its all-news format, Wilson returned to WBBF. In May 1978, Wilson joined news talk station WROC (later to become WPXN). In August, Wilson was named sports director and full-time host of WROC's "Sportstalk.". In September 1978, Wilson added TV to his resume, joining WHEC-TV delivering the 6 and 11 p.m. Saturday sportscasts for the market's top-rated weekend newscast. In July 1980, Wilson left both his radio and TV jobs to join WSAY as sports director delivering drive-time commentaries and hosting a nightly sports talk show "Chuck Wilson on Sports".

=== Radio/TV career in Providence, Rhode Island ===
In July 1981, WEAN radio in Providence, Rhode Island, reached out to Wilson and hired him to report sports in afternoon drive and to start a nightly sports talk show (the market was without one). "Chuck Wilson on Sports" broke twenty wire stories in its first three years. In 1985, WEAN was sold and in 1986, Wilson was among the final news staffers let go during conversion from news-talk-sports to an automated format. At the time, Wilson's show was number one on the AM dial from 5 to 8 p.m. with male listeners. The show returned to the air on WICE radio on October 27, 1986. In the spring of 1987 Arbitron ratings, the show posted the station's highest-rated hours.

In 1988, WICE became the flagship station for the first (and only) season of the New England Steamrollers in the Arena Football League. Chuck Wilson called the play-by-play and former NFL All-Pro safety Tim Fox provided the analysis. In addition, Wilson hosted and co-produced the weekly coach's show on WNAC-TV with Coach Babe Parilli. Wilson also appeared once a week as a featured co-host on a "Live" call-in segment on WLNE-TV's Sunday night sports wrap-up show from October 1988 to December 1989.

In April 1989, Wilson left WICE and joined WPRO. That year, Wilson was honored with the UPI Tom Phillips Award for "Best New England Sports Coverage". In April 1993, Wilson left the local airways as part of a mass exodus when WPRO and WPRO-FM were sold by ABC/Cap Cities. The Boston Globe wrote "Chuck Wilson is New England's top sports talk show host...He engages guests in Q&A similar to the manner of Bob Costas...In the latest rating book, Wilson's show was No. 1 in the market, including FM stations, between 5 and 8 p.m. with males 25 to 49.

=== ESPN Radio (1991–2005, 2010–2013) ===
In November 1991, Wilson was the first host hired for the start-up of the ESPN Radio Network. "Applications for the ESPN jobs flooded the network's offices—more than 200 from all over the country. But Wilson was the first to be chosen…and he hadn't applied. He never even auditioned," John Walsh, Executive Editor of ESPN, told the Providence Journal. "We knew Chuck had a terrific program in Rhode Island. We chose him because we liked his knowledge, his news instincts, his writing, the feel of his voice and his literate approach to the program."

ESPN Radio debuted January 4, 1992, on 151 stations with Wilson and Tony Bruno as co-hosts. The 7-hour program aired from 6 pm to 1 am ET Saturdays and Sundays. The network's credibility was enhanced with a third co-host from the TV side: Keith Olbermann one day and Mike Tirico the other. By 1996, ESPN Radio affiliates totaled 420 non-duplicative stations and in 2001, as the network approached its 10th anniversary, there were 690 network affiliates, 195 full-time

Wilson went full-time at ESPN in 1994 and moved from weekends to weeknights when ESPN Radio's talk programming expanded to seven night's a week. Wilson remained on Gamenight until late July 2005.

Wilson twice won international awards for his reporting, commentary and analysis including one as co-host of "ESPN Radio Viewpoints" with Frank Deford. In addition to co-hosting Gamenight, Wilson hosted "ESPN Classic Presents the Legends on ESPN Radio", in which he conducted in-depth, one-on-one interviews with legendary sports figures. In 2001, Wilson's "Legends" interview with Jerry West was the only "Finalist" at the New York Festival International Awards for long-form interview series. Wilson has been described as the "Voice of Reason" and the "Conscience of ESPN Radio" for his thoughtful, even-handed approach in the booth. His Chuck Wilson on Sports program on Saturday mornings, and his commentaries for the network, often dealt with sportsmanship and integrity issues.

In late January 2005, ESPN informed Wilson that he would not be retained when his five-year contract expired. Wilson's last day on ESPN Radio was July 26, 2005, until he returned to ESPN Radio on March 14, 2010, hosting "SportsCenter Tonight" and other shows and specials for the network. The stint ended in March 2013.

=== XM Radio (2005–2008) ===
Wilson joined XM Satellite Radio (now SiriusXM) in September 2005 in a part-time role for the network's baseball channel MLB Home Plate (now MLB Network Radio) and became full-time in February 2006. He hosted "MLB on Deck", "XM Hot Stove" and "MLB Postseason" and filled in on each of the other shows on the channel. Wilson also was the primary fill-in for Charley Steiner on XM's "Baseball Beat." In addition, Wilson wrote, co-produced and narrated specials for the channel including "Yankee Stadium Remembered." Wilson's job was "eliminated" in November 2008 after the Sirius/XM Satellite merger.

=== Even Field ===
Wilson is a longtime advocate of sportsmanship, fair play, and ethical behavior in athletics. In 2013, he founded Even Field, a nonprofit character development organization that promotes integrity, life skills and leadership through sports. Even Field's core message is "The Way You Win Matters" in sports and in life. "We want to help young people develop the courage to be honest and trustworthy on and off the playing field," said Wilson who added, "We want to be a resource so that we can help youth coaches, parents and student athletes get the most out of the team sports experience and a lot of it has to do with having a positive team culture. It's about helping kids to develop the kinds of traits, habits and skills that are going to help them long-term."

== Honors ==
=== "100 Most Influential Sports Educators in America" ===
In 2007, Wilson was named one of the "100 Most Influential Sports Educators in America" by the Institute for International Sport (IIS). Wilson was selected from a list of more than 1,500 nominees. The only other broadcaster named was Bob Costas. According to an IIS news release: "This project is aimed at honoring individuals and organizations who have creatively and effectively used sport in the very best way - as a means to educate and shape positive values"

=== "Best National Sports Radio Host of the Decade" ===
In December 2009, Sports Illustrated.com named Wilson runner-up for "Best National Radio Host" of the decade as part of SI.com's best and worst of the decade in sports broadcasting. In December 2010, Wilson, along with ESPN Radio colleagues Doug Brown, Marc Kestecher, and Jon Stashower, were named "Best National Radio Voices for 2010" by Sports Illustrated. In December, 2011, the ESPN Radio anchors were named as "Best National Voices for 2011" by S.I. Media critic Richard Deitsch, who added "If I were to single out an individual for this award, I'd likely give it to Chuck Wilson."

=== Rhode Island Radio Hall of Fame ===
In 2011, Wilson was elected to the Rhode Island Radio Hall of Fame. "Chuck Wilson on Sports" was the first nightly sports talk show in New England to incorporate weekly contributors. The show had a 12-year run from 1981 to 1993. In 2016, Wilson was elected to the Words Unlimited Hall-of-Fame.
