= Truman Taylor =

American broadcaster and essayist

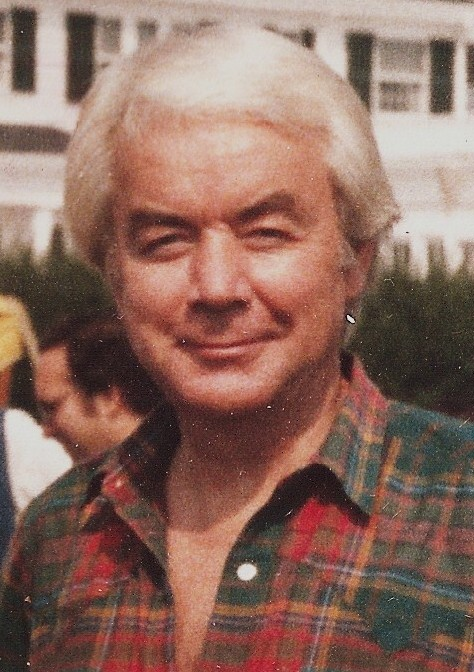
- Truman Taylor in 1999
- Born: March 9, 1932 (age 93); Boston, Massachusetts, U.S.
- Occupations: Television broadcaster; Television programmer; Television producer; Newspaper columnist
- Years active: 1954–present
- Spouse: Camille Dennison (m. 1956)
- Children: 5

Truman Taylor (born March 9, 1932) is an American essayist and former television personality. In addition to writing op-ed commentaries for The Providence Journal, he was a fixture on local television in Providence, Rhode Island, from the early 1960s to 2005. In 2022 he was inducted into the Rhode Island Radio and Television Hall of Fame.

== Career in broadcasting ==
Taylor began his broadcasting career in Bangor, Maine in 1954. In 1962, he moved to WLNE-TV (formerly WTEV), when that ABC affiliate went on the air in Providence, Rhode Island. Initially a news reporter, he became the station's news anchor for its evening news program in 1964. Beginning in 1972, Taylor was WTEV's news director as well as on-air anchorman, continuing in both roles until 1980. He later was director of programming at the station from 1984 to 2001.

In 1965, Taylor began a weekly interview program which he hosted for the next forty years, until December 2005. Prominent guests appearing on the program included Presidents Jimmy Carter and George H. W. Bush, Barbara Bush, and Senator Ted Kennedy (D-Mass.). Taylor also liked to have unusual guests on his show who he felt would interest viewers, such as a man who claimed to have invented an inhalable vitamin or a guest who trained monkeys to assist paraplegics by responding to voice commands. Robert Whitcomb, editor of The Providence Journal editorial page, who worked with Taylor on the program in its later years, described his colleague as "...endlessly charming, laid-back and unflappable, with a capacious memory."

Taylor's interviews in the 1970s–1980s on his program, The Senators Respond, with Senator John Chafee (R-RI) and Edward M. Kennedy (D-MA) which were produced in Washington D.C. have been preserved by the University of Rhode Island's John H. Chaffee Audio Collection. The interviews dealt with such issues as minimum wage laws, discrimination, consumer protection, and nuclear waste. In 1984, Taylor's other program from Washington, D.C., Channel 6 in Washington with Truman Taylor, featured Senator George J. Mitchell (D-Maine), along with Chaffee.. Washington notables such as Barbara Bush and Condoleeza Rice also were guests on the program.

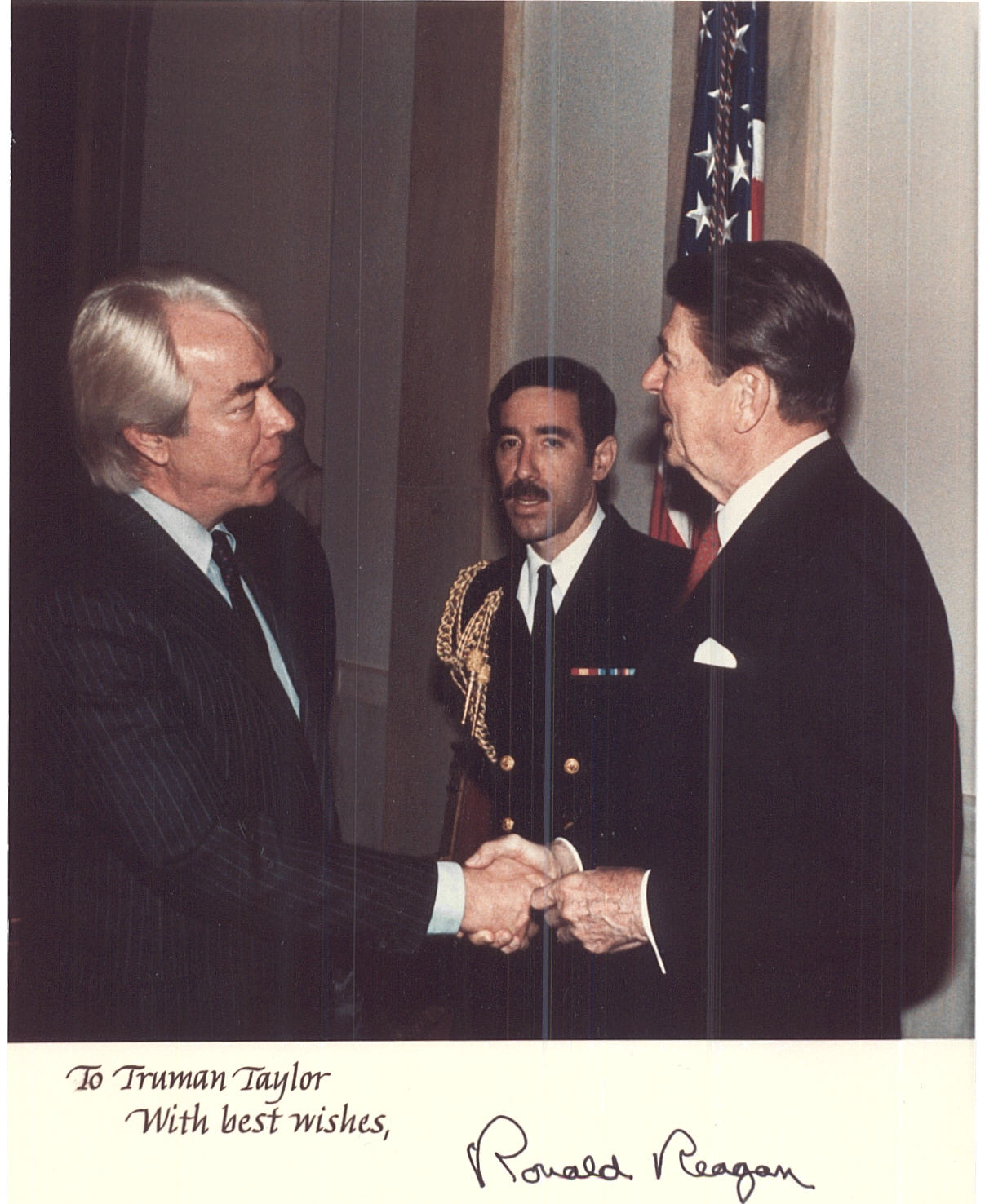
Taylor at the White House with Ronald Reagan, following the President's on-air "Job-A-Thon" phone call in 1983

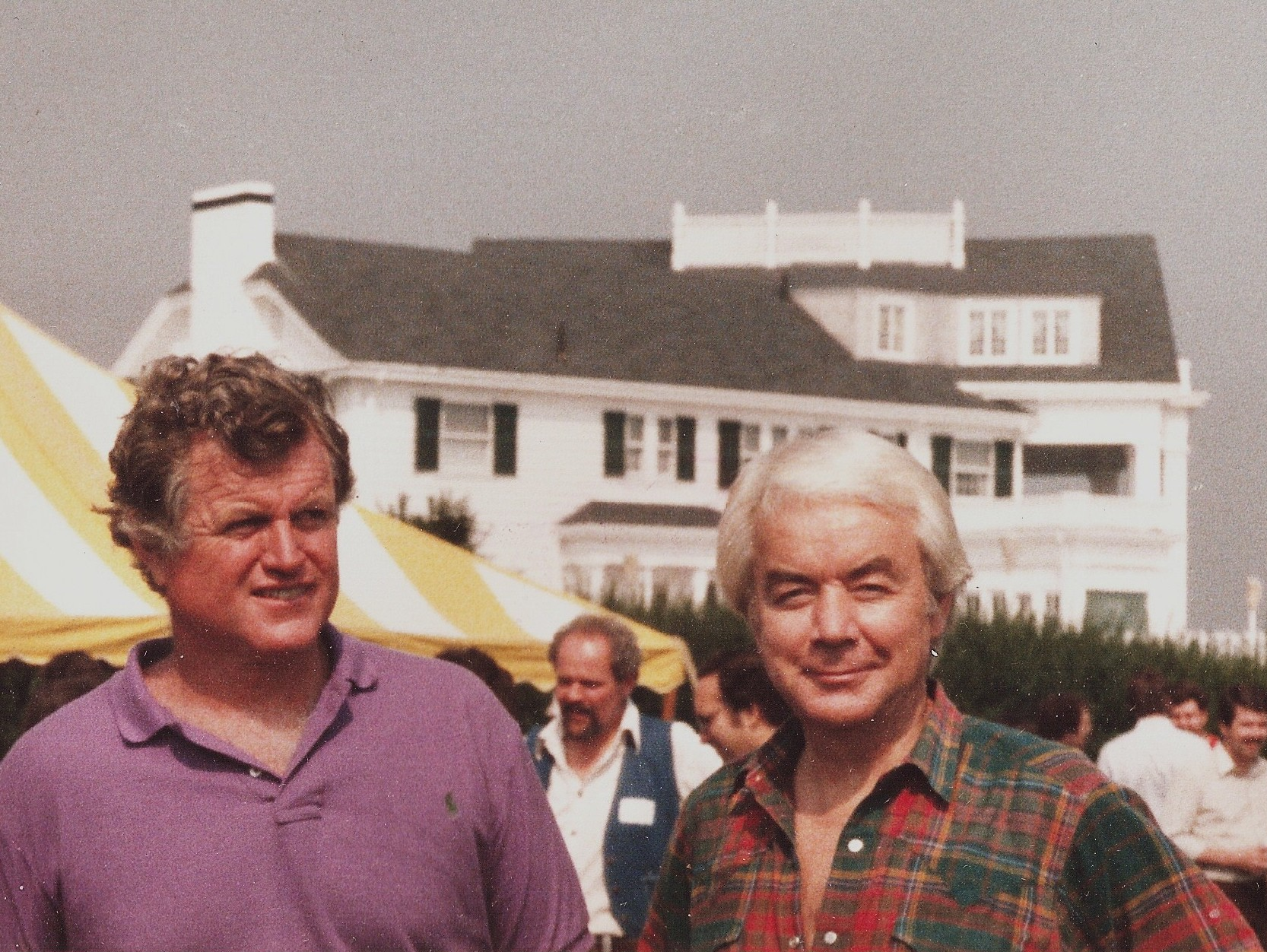
Taylor (right) with Senator Ted Kennedy at the Kennedy compound in 1999

In January 1983, Taylor produced and hosted an unusual "Job-A-Thon" show, pre-empting network programs in prime time. More than 200 unemployed job seekers appeared on the 3-hour program to present their qualifications and career aspirations. The state employment departments of Rhode Island and Massachusetts joined in the effort by obtaining job pledges from area employers. President Ronald Reagan phoned Taylor while the program was on the air to implore companies to offer jobs and praised the effort, saying to the audience, "This is a fine example of a private sector initiative, and I thank you for being so creative". Taylor recounted years later in one of his Journal columns that he was invited to a White House lunch the week after the phone call to hear President Reagan speak on the administration's strong support of private-sector initiatives. Reagan told him after lunch that, "...this country has always been all about Americans helping their neighbors who, at the moment, for one reason or another, can't help themselves", he wrote.

On his weekly interview show in September 2001, Taylor was confronted by an angry Buddy Cianci. The then-mayor of Providence was enraged by Taylor's questions regarding corruption charges that would eventually result in the long-serving mayor's conviction and imprisonment. The acrimonious clash is recounted in Mike Stanton's book, The Prince of Providence: The Rise and Fall of Buddy Cianci, America's Most Notorious Mayor. When Taylor's broadcasting schedule at WLNE was reduced in 2000, the station's manager told The Providence Journal that Taylor was "the voice that put channel 6 on the air", saying, "What people don't realize about Truman is how many roles he played here, how many challenges he has faced."

== Newspaper commentator ==
For more than twenty years Taylor wrote op-ed commentaries for the Providence Journal newspaper, on such widely diverse topics as local and national politics, traffic woes, Ted Turner's vast land holdings, champagne, and sports. In his June 14, 2007, column, for example, he assailed Rep. Edward Markey (D-Mass.) for supporting the extension of daylight saving time, after commenting a few weeks previously on then-North Korean leader Kim Jong-il's fondness for Hennessy cognac. In a column on Leap Day the following year, Taylor wrote of the plight of sea turtles trying to nest on the beach at Longboat Key, Florida. Near the end of the 2014 Major League Baseball season, he wrote an article "The way to catch a baseball", a tongue-in-cheek commentary on the collapse of the last-place Boston Red Sox, who had been World Series champions the year before, saying, "Playing the game of baseball this year seemed to be something with which the Red Sox were unfamiliar".

Taylor's columns have been syndicated for publication in other newspapers. His 2006 commentary on Scotch whiskey ("Hard Stuff, Hard Core") was picked up by the New York Post. In it, he described Scotch as "serious drink for serious people".

== Awards ==
In 2004, Taylor was honored as a "Golden Circle" member of the New England chapter of the National Television Academy for his fifty years in broadcasting. He has received seven Emmy nominations and is in the Rhode Island Radio and Television Hall of Fame

== Personal life ==
Taylor is married to Camille Taylor (née Dennison). They wed in 1956 and make their home in Massachusetts. They have five grown children.
