= Steve Cascione =

American television meteorologist

- Born: November 12, 1954 (age 71); Providence, Rhode Island, US
- Occupation: Meteorologist

Steve Cascione was born in Providence, Rhode Island, on November 12, 1954. After graduating from Classical High School in Providence, Cascione attended the University of Rhode Island where he graduated in 1977 with a BA degree in Geography and Meteorology. Cascione attended MIT, where he took graduate courses in weather forecasting. In 1978, he went on to become a forecast meteorologist for AccuWeather in State College, Pennsylvania. In 1980, Cascione returned to Rhode Island, worked at WLNE-TV ABC6, and he created a weather consulting business called Ocean State Weather. During his first stint at WLNE, he hosted the self-titled cooking segment Steve's Cooking Up a Storm.

After 22 years at WLNE, Cascione left to begin employment at WPRI-TV12, where he served for five years as meteorologist for the station's weekday morning and Noon newscasts, later their weekend morning newscasts. He received the Silver Circle Award from the National Television Academy's Boston/New England Chapter in 2006.

In 2008, Cascione returned to WLNE-TV. He first served as meteorologist for Good Morning Providence and the Noon newscasts on weekdays, and he later served as co-anchor of the newscasts until 2009. He also hosted the cooking segment Cooking Fresh with Dave's Marketplace with Chef Walter Potenza. In 2009, he became meteorologist for the station's weekend evening newscasts (briefly doubling as news anchor) and a features reporter. In May 2011, he was moved back to the weekday morning and noon newscasts. Beginning in the summer of 2011, Cascione took part in a weekly cooking segment on ABC6 News This Morning with anchors Mark Curtis and Doreen Scanlon, entitled the Curtis/Cascione Cook-Off. He returned to the weekend evening newscasts in 2015 and resigned in October 2016. Since 2017, Steve has worked for the State of Rhode Island Department of Transportation. In August 2018, Steve, along with chef Walter Potenza, launched a cooking show on the CW Providence affiliate, called Flavors and Knowledge. This show runs 4 times a week and incorporates recipes and history of different regions in Italy.

Steve holds the AMS Seal of Approval. He also teaches aviation meteorology at the New England Institute of Technology as a part-time professor. Steven resides in Connecticut with his wife Lisa and blended family.
