= Gene Sherman (sportscaster) =

Gene E. Sherman (November 13, 1921 - August 27, 2000) was a pioneer radio and television sportscaster in Iowa. He worked for KCAU-TV in Sioux City, Iowa as a sports commentator in broadcasting.

== Biography ==
For a number of years, Gene Sherman and Dave Dedrick cohosted the Big Bowl from Sioux City, Iowa.

For more than twenty years, Gene Sherman was the voice of the Chargers at Briar Cliff College. He was inducted into the Charger Hall of Fame in 1999.
