= Full Channel =

American telecommunications company

Full Channel, Inc.
- Industry: Telecommunications
- Founded: 1965
- Founders: John Donofrio, Hilda Donofrio
- Headquarters: 57 Everett Street; Warren, RI 02885; United States
- Products: Cable television, Broadband Internet, Digital telephony
- Number of employees: 20+ (2013)

Full Channel, Inc. was an American pay television and telecommunications provider set in Rhode Island. At the time of its acquisition by CountryWide Broadband it was the third-largest cable television and Internet service provider in the state. Its wired communications network was available to the approximately 50,000 residents of Bristol County, Rhode Island. Full Channel's main office was at 57 Everett Street in Warren, Rhode Island, U.S.

== History ==
In 1965, John Donofrio, a former broadcast engineer and general manager at WPFM (now WLVO) in Providence and sales executive at Charles River Broadcasting in Boston, founded Full-Channel TV, Inc. upon learning of the potential success of Community Antenna Television. Later that year, Donofrio's company applied for and was awarded the first cable television franchise in Rhode Island after his application was approved by the City of East Providence. However, before Full Channel began construction of a system in East Providence, cable television franchising authority was transferred away from local municipalities to the Rhode Island Public Utilities Commission. In 1974, Full Channel was among the nine original cable franchises awarded by the PUC and was ultimately assigned to the state's CATV Service Area 5, Bristol County, Rhode Island. It would not be until 1982 that legal wrangling would allow for the original franchisees to begin building their systems.

In 1982, Full Channel hired a workforce, opened a local business office and began building its cable system. In the winter of 1983, the company's first cable television subscriber was connected. The company remained the only cable provider in Bristol County until 2001 when Cox Communications overbuilt Full Channel as part of its bid to service the entire state of Rhode Island.

From Donofrio's death in 2004 until 2018, his daughter Linda Jane Maaia, son-in-law William Maaia and grandson Levi C. Maaia ran the company until the sale of its telecommunications network to CountryWide Broadband for an undisclosed price.

- In 1983 Full Channel became the first cable operator in Rhode Island to deploy analog addressable set-top converters allowing customers to watch pay-per-view events and premium networks
- In 2001 Full Channel begins offering cable modem Internet service
- In 2002 Full Channel begins offering digital TV
- In 2003 Full Channel completes its hybrid fiber-coax and digital system upgrades
- In 2004 Full Channel begins offering local telephone service as a Verizon reseller
- In 2004 After the death of company founder and president John Donofrio, Linda Jane Maaia takes over operations of the company
- In 2008 The company launches its GreenLink wind energy program
- In 2009 CableFAX awards Full Channel its Top Operator award for community service
- In 2011 Full Channel becomes the fourth U.S. cable system to offer Al Jazeera English in its lineup
- In 2011 Full Channel begins offering residential Digital Phone services
- In 2013 Full Channel upgrades its network to DOCSIS 3.0 broadband Internet service
- In 2013 Full Channel launches TV Everywhere platform for on-demand, online viewing of cable TV networks
- In 2014 Full Channel co-founder and chairwoman Hilda Donofrio passes away
- In 2014 Full Channel begins offering Digital Phone services for businesses
- In 2016 Full Channel retired its analog Expanded TV lineup in favor of all digital transmission
- In 2017 Full Channel announced its intentions to preserve its strict network neutrality and consumer privacy policies despite FCC deregulation of internet service providers.
- In 2018 Full Channel was acquired by CountryWide Broadband
- In 2019, Full Channel begins offering services under the i3 Broadband name.
