= KLKN =

Television station in Lincoln, Nebraska

- Lincoln, Nebraska; United States
- Channels: Digital: 8 (VHF); Virtual: 8
- Branding: Channel 8 KLKN-TV; Channel 8 News

Programming
- Affiliations: 8.1: ABC; for others, see § Subchannels

Ownership
- Owner: Standard Media; (Community News Media LLC)

History
- First air date: December 3, 1964 (Note: Channel 8 signed on as KHQL-TV, a satellite of KHOL-TV, from Albion in 1964. It broadcast independently as KBGT-TV from June 1984 to November 1986, became a satellite of KCAU-TV in November 1986, and moved to Lincoln as KLKN on April 1, 1996.)
- Former call signs: KHQL-TV (1964–1974); KCNA-TV (1974–1983); KBGT-TV (1983–1987); KCAN-TV (1987–1996)
- Former channel numbers: Analog: 8 (VHF, 1964–2009); Digital: 31 (UHF, 2002–2009)
- Former affiliations: ABC (1964–1984 via KHOL-TV/KHGI-TV, 1986–1996 via KCAU-TV); Independent (1984–1986)
- Call sign meaning: Lincoln

Technical information
- Licensing authority: FCC
- Facility ID: 11264
- ERP: 53 kW
- HAAT: 435 m (1,427 ft)
- Transmitter coordinates: 40°52′59″N 97°18′20″W
- Translator(s): 35 (UHF) Lincoln

Links
- Public license information: Public file; LMS
- Website: www.klkntv.com

KLKN (channel 8) is a television station in Lincoln, Nebraska, United States, affiliated with ABC. Owned by Standard Media, the station maintains studios on 10th Street south of downtown Lincoln and broadcasts from a transmitter located near Utica, Nebraska.

Channel 8 in central Nebraska was originally allocated to Albion and signed on in December 1964 as KHQL-TV, part of the ABC-affiliated Nebraska Television Network (NTV); the call letters changed to KCNA-TV in 1974. NTV's owners, the Amaturo Group, upgraded the KCNA-TV transmitter facility and split it from the network in 1984 as KBGT-TV "Big 8", the first independent station in the state of Nebraska. This lasted two years before Citadel Communications acquired the station and converted it at the end of 1986 into KCAN, which rebroadcast ABC affiliate KCAU-TV in Sioux City, Iowa.

Beginning in 1991, Citadel campaigned to move KCAN from Albion to Lincoln, where it would give the capital city two commercial television stations for the first time since the 1950s. The move began on April 1, 1996, when KLKN began broadcasting from Lincoln. The station also began producing its own local newscasts covering the Lincoln area. Even though Lincoln, Kearney, and Hastings are defined as one media market, KLKN and NTV generally focus on separate areas, serving Lincoln and the Tri-Cities, respectively. Satellite television providers Dish Network and DirecTV provide both stations across the entire market.

== History ==
=== Channel 8 at Albion: The NTV years ===
In January 1961, a plan was released proposing the use of five additional very high frequency (VHF) channels for educational use in the state of Nebraska to expand the coverage of KUON-TV in Lincoln to 90 percent of the state population: channel 13 at Alliance, channel 8 at Albion, channel 3 at Bassett, channel 4 at Kearney, and channel 9 at North Platte. KHOL-TV, an ABC affiliate in Kearney, also expressed interest in the allocation at Albion, 90 miles (140 km) northwest of Lincoln, and began to survey the area as part of plans to locate a satellite of its station in Albion. The matter became entangled in several other channel allocation proceedings, but in November 1962, the Federal Communications Commission (FCC) approved most of the educational television plan—except it protected channel 8 as a commercial station and assigned a UHF channel for educational use in Albion.

In the wake of the decision, the Bi-States Company, owner of KHOL-TV, applied for stations in Albion and Superior to repeat the Kearney outlet, which the FCC approved in February 1964. With the call sign KHQL-TV—matching KHOL-TV and its satellite KHPL-TV—the station was constructed and began telecasting on December 3, 1964.

In 1974, NTV Enterprises acquired the network; on June 4, concurrent with changes at all of the NTV stations, KHQL-TV became KCNA-TV (for the largest towns in its service area, Columbus, Norfolk, and Albion). Joseph Amaturo bought the NTV stations in 1979 in a deal funded by the sale of KQTV in St. Joseph, Missouri.

=== Big 8 ===
Amaturo Group announced in September 1983 that it would split KCNA-TV from the NTV network to become an independent station, move its transmitter to Genoa in Nance County to increase coverage, and rebrand it as KBGT-TV "Big 8" on November 1. (The name was a nod to the Big Eight Conference, of which the University of Nebraska–Lincoln was a member.) The November 1 date was missed when construction problems caused delays in constructing the Genoa tower before the project shut down for the winter, and Big 8 began on June 16, 1984, as the first independent station in Nebraska and with a 24-hour program schedule.

Despite offering a typical schedule for an independent of its era, including syndicated programs, movies, sports, and national news coverage, Big 8 failed to catch on. The delayed construction process gave rise to a lawsuit filed by NTV in July 1984 against the contractor, seeking $1.4 million over what were described as substantial financial losses. The station's decision to briefly air unedited films, including nudity and strong language, in May 1986 led to boycotts and the loss of half of its local and national advertisers, and the depressed regional farm economy further weighed on the business. Meanwhile, the Amaturo Group sold all of its other holdings during 1985. Three major-market FM stations were acquired by Keymarket Communications for $60 million, and NTV—but not KBGT-TV—was purchased by Gordon Broadcasting for $10 million. Amaturo later stated that, over the life of Big 8, the venture lost nearly $5 million (equivalent to $12.1 million in 2025 dollars).

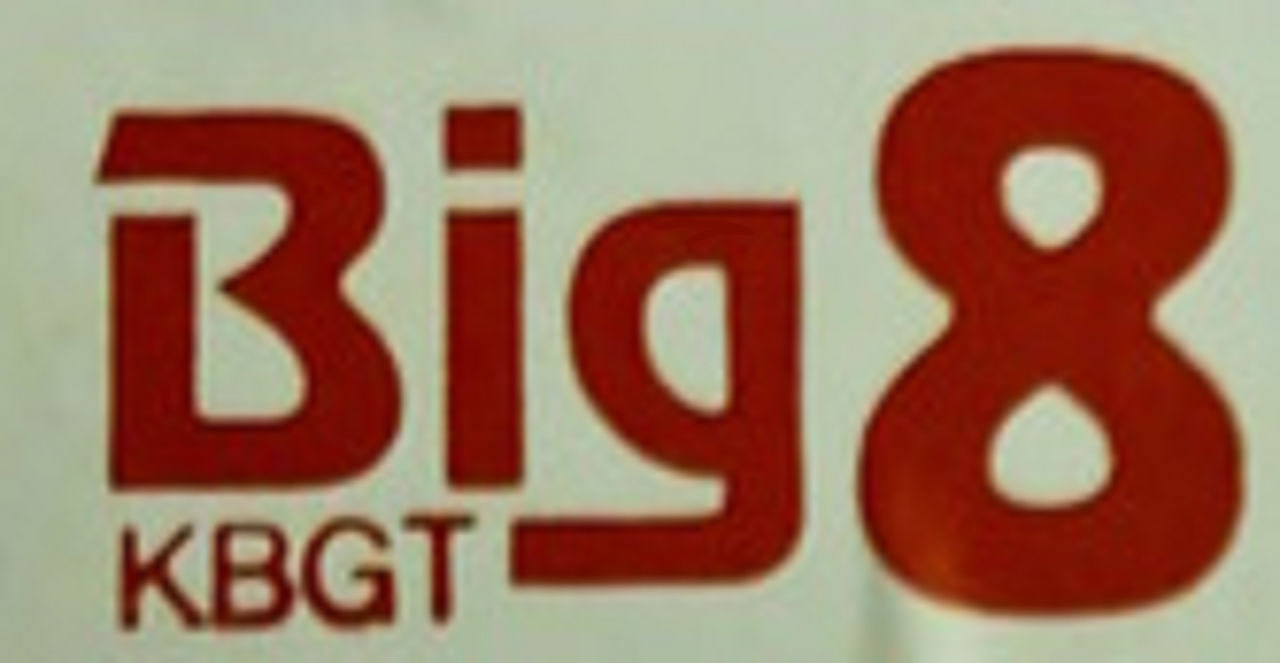
KBGT-TV logo used as an independent station

=== KCAN ===
In July 1986, Amaturo filed to sell KBGT-TV to Citadel Communications for $3 million. The sale contract excluded KBGT-TV's syndicated programming and film inventories. The FCC approved the sale in November, earlier than expected, and Citadel announced its plan for the station: to rebroadcast KCAU-TV, its ABC affiliate in Sioux City, Iowa. This restored ABC service to some households in and around Albion that were not covered by KCAU-TV itself, KETV in Omaha, or NTV. It also led to the station being removed from cable systems from Lincoln to Kearney.

In January 1987, the call letters were changed to KCAN. This designation also represented Columbus, Albion and Norfolk, in addition to tying the station more closely to KCAU-TV.

=== Move to Lincoln ===
Citadel filed in 1991 to move KCAN from Albion to Lincoln, proposing to build a satellite station on channel 18 to serve the Albion area in order to meet an FCC requirement. Citadel contended that Lincoln was the most underserved city of its size in the United States and among the most underserved state capitals for television service. This was mostly due to a historical quirk. While Lincoln had been allocated two VHF channels and briefly had two commercial stations, that number became one when KOLN, originally on channel 12, bought the assets and physical plant of KFOR-TV and moved to its channel 10 in 1954; channel 12 was then donated to the University of Nebraska and became KUON-TV. Besides KOLN, Lincoln viewers generally watched the Omaha network affiliates, including ABC affiliate KETV, which was cited as the most direct competition for a relocated KCAN.

The move was formally protested by KOLN as well as KPTM, the Fox affiliate in Omaha; KOLN's rebuttal cited concerns about signal overlap and loss of service in Albion, while KPTM objected on technical grounds. The FCC gave initial approval to the city of license change in 1993, and final approval was awarded in June 1995, after which construction immediately began on a new transmitter site at Utica and work began to secure studio space in downtown Lincoln. Another factor that had delayed approval was that when the FCC assigned UHF channel 18 to Albion in place of channel 8, Fant Broadcasting—owners of NTV at the time—and Citadel both applied for it, with Citadel instead receiving channel 24, which was also added to Albion by the commission. Citadel then protested a proposed sale of NTV to Blackstar Communications in 1995, feeling that Fant Broadcasting had attempted to block its own Lincoln proposal; company president Anthony Fant denied this, noting that his main goal for seeking the Albion channel was to restore the coverage lost a decade prior and "try to put that part of the NTV puzzle back together".

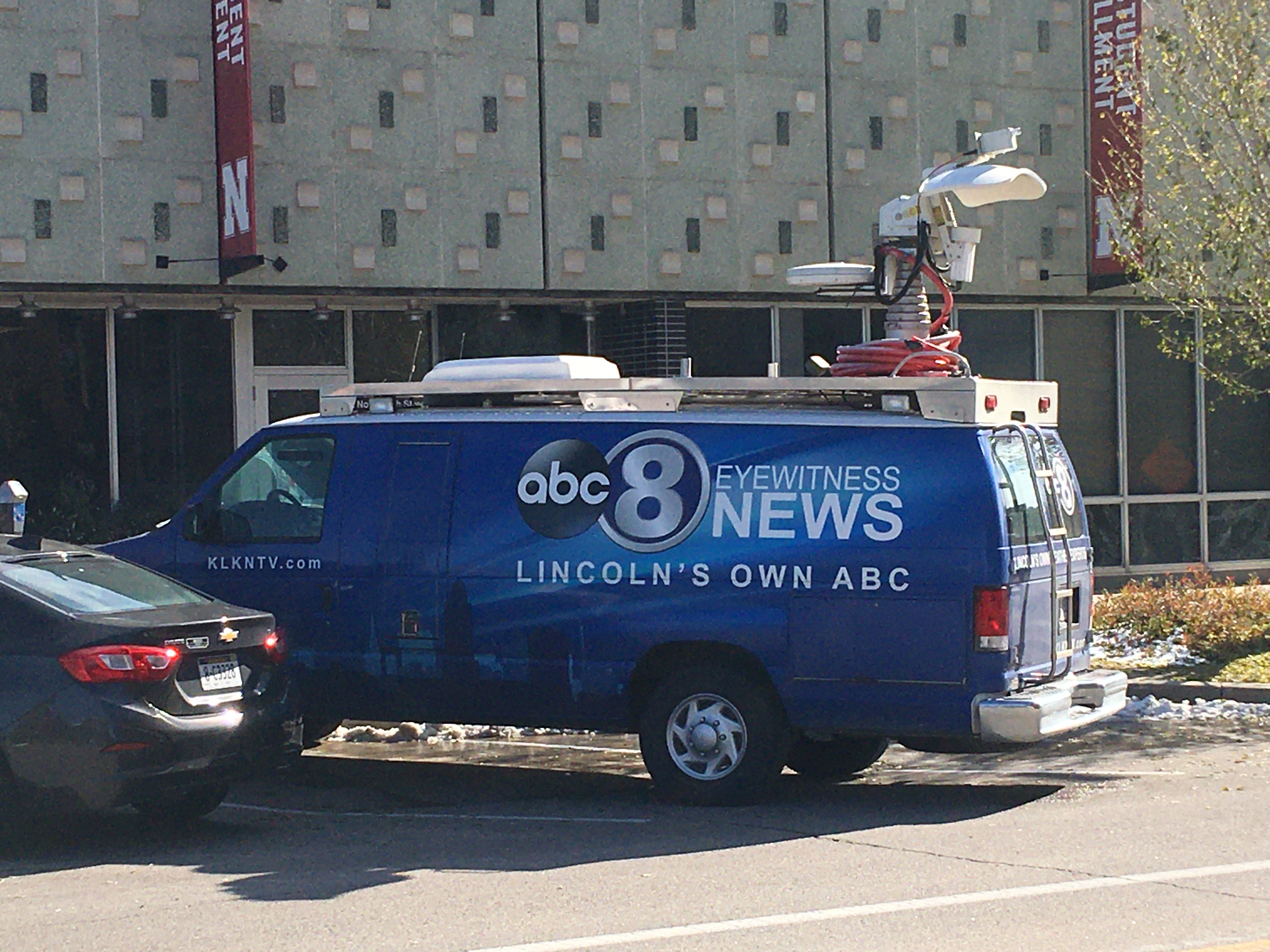
A KLKN live news truck parked at the University of Nebraska–Lincoln.

The search for a studio location continued into November as the company sought an existing site with appropriate satellite visibility to receive programming; new KLKN call letters were given to channel 8, and the Albion replacement facility on channel 24 received the call letters KLKE (as it was located near Elgin). The launch was further delayed when it was discovered that a 10-foot (3.0 m) section, intended to be installed at the 190-foot (58 m) level, was skipped—when the tower had already been built up to 620 feet (190 m).

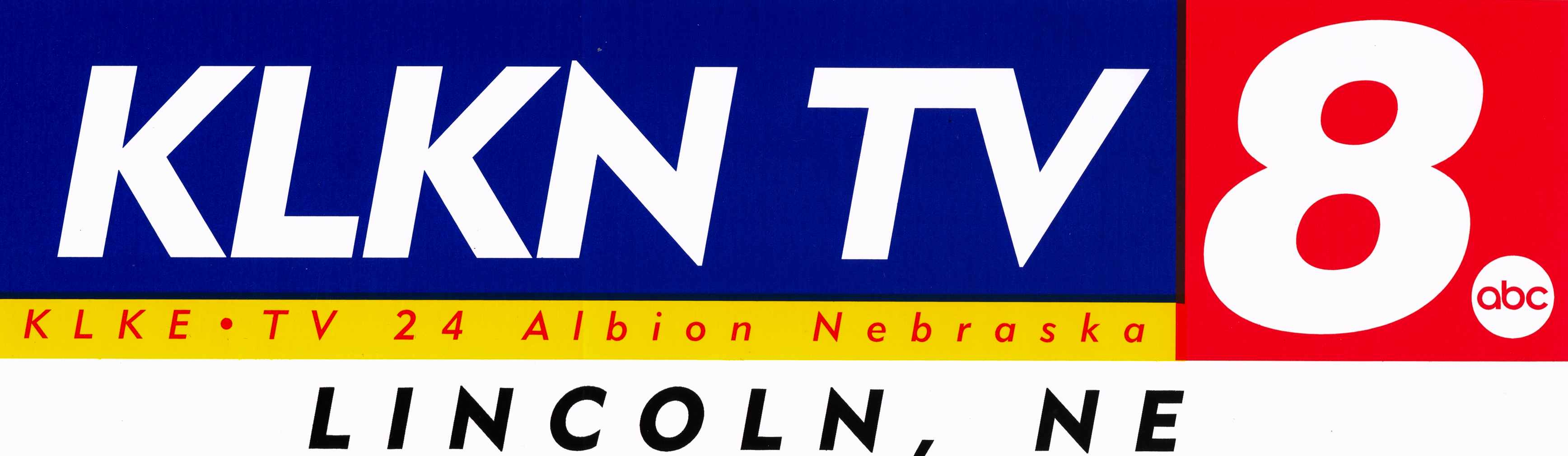
KLKN-TV logo from 1996 to 2003

KLKN began broadcasting on March 30, 1996. On April 1, cable subscribers in Lincoln began viewing KLKN on the Lincoln Cablevision system, but it was not until May 20 that the transmitter facility was activated. The station expanded news production modestly in the ensuing years. When it began in 1996, it produced 6 and 10 p.m. news programs with a newsroom staff of 16. By 2000, the staff had grown to 21, and KLKN was airing additional early evening, morning, and midday newscasts. While ratings comparisons with KOLN/KGIN were difficult given that the latter station serves a much larger area (which for ABC programs is split between NTV and KLKN), within a year, it had achieved 10 percent of the news audience in Lincoln, comparable to the Omaha stations and increasing the share of Lincoln TV viewers watching local news programs originating in Lincoln.

KLKN's digital signal signed on August 31, 2002, operating on UHF channel 31 until the end of the station's analog broadcasts on June 12, 2009. It was the first digital television station in Nebraska. However, KLKE was shuttered by Citadel on March 2, 2003, with the company citing the high costs of digital television conversion for the Albion facility. After the digital transition, KLKN opted to continue broadcasting on channel 8.

=== Standard and Rincon ownership ===
After Citadel attempted to sell its television properties in 2000, and after the 2014 sale of three of the five major Citadel properties to Nexstar Broadcasting Group, Citadel sold its last two ABC affiliates—KLKN and WLNE-TV, serving Providence, Rhode Island—to Standard Media for $83 million. Its leader, former Young Broadcasting and Media General executive Deb McDermott, had begun her career in Lincoln at KOLN. The sale was completed on September 5.

In February 2022, Standard Media's owner, Standard General, announced that KLKN would be sold to Cox Media Group as part of a transaction that would allow Standard General to purchase broadcast group Tegna. The deal never received FCC approval and was terminated on May 22, 2023.

On September 22, 2025, it was announced that Rincon Broadcasting Group would be buying KLKN along with the other stations owned by Standard Media for $50 million; the sale was completed on February 27, 2026. In March 2026, Rincon president Todd Parkin filed to transfer Rincon Broadcasting to Community News Media, an affiliate of Standard Media. The sale was completed on October 1.

== Notable former on-air staff ==
- Thomas Roberts — reporter, 1997–1998

== Technical information and subchannels ==
The main KLKN transmitter is located near Utica, Nebraska. A digital replacement translator on channel 35 is located at the KLKN studios on 10th Street in Lincoln. The signal is multiplexed:

Subchannels of KLKN
Subchannel	Res.	Short name	Programming
8.1	1080i	KLKN-TV	ABC
8.2	720p	GRIT	Grit
8.3	480i	Mystery	Ion Mystery
8.4	480i	Laff	Laff
8.6	720p	Bounce	Bounce TV
