= KCAU-TV =

Television station in Sioux City, Iowa

- Sioux City, Iowa; United States
- Channels: Digital: 9 (VHF); Virtual: 9
- Branding: KCAU-TV 9; KCAU 9 News

Programming
- Affiliations: 9.1: ABC; for others, see § Subchannels

Ownership
- Owner: Nexstar Media Group; (Nexstar Media Inc.)

History
- First air date: March 29, 1953
- Former call signs: KVTV (1953–1967)
- Former channel numbers: Analog: 9 (VHF, 1953–2009); Digital: 30 (UHF, until 2009)
- Former affiliations: CBS (1953–1967); NBC (secondary, 1953–1954); DuMont (secondary, 1953–1955); ABC (secondary, 1953–1967)

Technical information
- Licensing authority: FCC
- Facility ID: 11265
- ERP: 29.5 kW
- HAAT: 616 m (2,021 ft)
- Transmitter coordinates: 42°35′12.2″N 96°13′57.1″W
- Translator(s): KNEN-LD 35.2 Norfolk, NE

Links
- Public license information: Public file; LMS
- Website: www.kcau9.com

KCAU-TV (channel 9) is a television station in Sioux City, Iowa, United States, affiliated with ABC and owned by Nexstar Media Group. The station's studios are located on Gordon Drive in Sioux City, and its transmitter is located near Hinton, Iowa.

The first television station in the region, the station began broadcasting as CBS affiliate KVTV in 1953. It was acquired in 1965 by a company that became known as Forward Communications; under Forward stewardship, the station activated a 2,000-foot (610 m) tower, changed its call sign to KCAU-TV and its affiliation to ABC in 1967, and became the leading station in the market through the early 1980s, when it was overtaken by its principal competitor, KTIV. It was owned by Citadel Communications from 1985 to 2014, when it was purchased by Nexstar.

== History ==
=== Early years ===
The Cowles Company, which owned WNAX in Yankton, South Dakota, filed to build a new television station on channel 9 in Sioux City, on June 30, 1952. The Federal Communications Commission (FCC) approved it on November 19, after a competing application from Siouxland Television Company merged into the Cowles bid; it was the second construction permit granted for a station in the city after one for UHF channel 36. A downtown office was set up on Pierce Street, and the transmitting facility was built north of the city at 41st and Howard streets. The call letters KVTV were selected; the station could not be WNAX-TV because the FCC did not allow two stations located in different cities to share the same base call sign.

KVTV began broadcasting on March 29, 1953. It was affiliated with CBS, NBC, and DuMont, with ABC coming on board shortly after launch. When KTIV signed on in 1954, NBC programming moved there, and the two stations split DuMont (until that network folded) and ABC. In 1956, KVTV moved to the former municipal auditorium at Seventh and Douglas streets in downtown Sioux City. The 1909 structure had previously functioned as Sioux City's municipal auditorium, a meeting place for fraternal organizations, and as the Tomba Ballroom.

One of the first programs on the new station was a children's show hosted by Jim Henry, who was approached to see if he knew anyone who would be a good host, but could not recommend anyone else. His Brooklyn accent made him an odd fit for a Western-themed kids' program, but Canyon Kid's Corner became a long-running feature of the station.

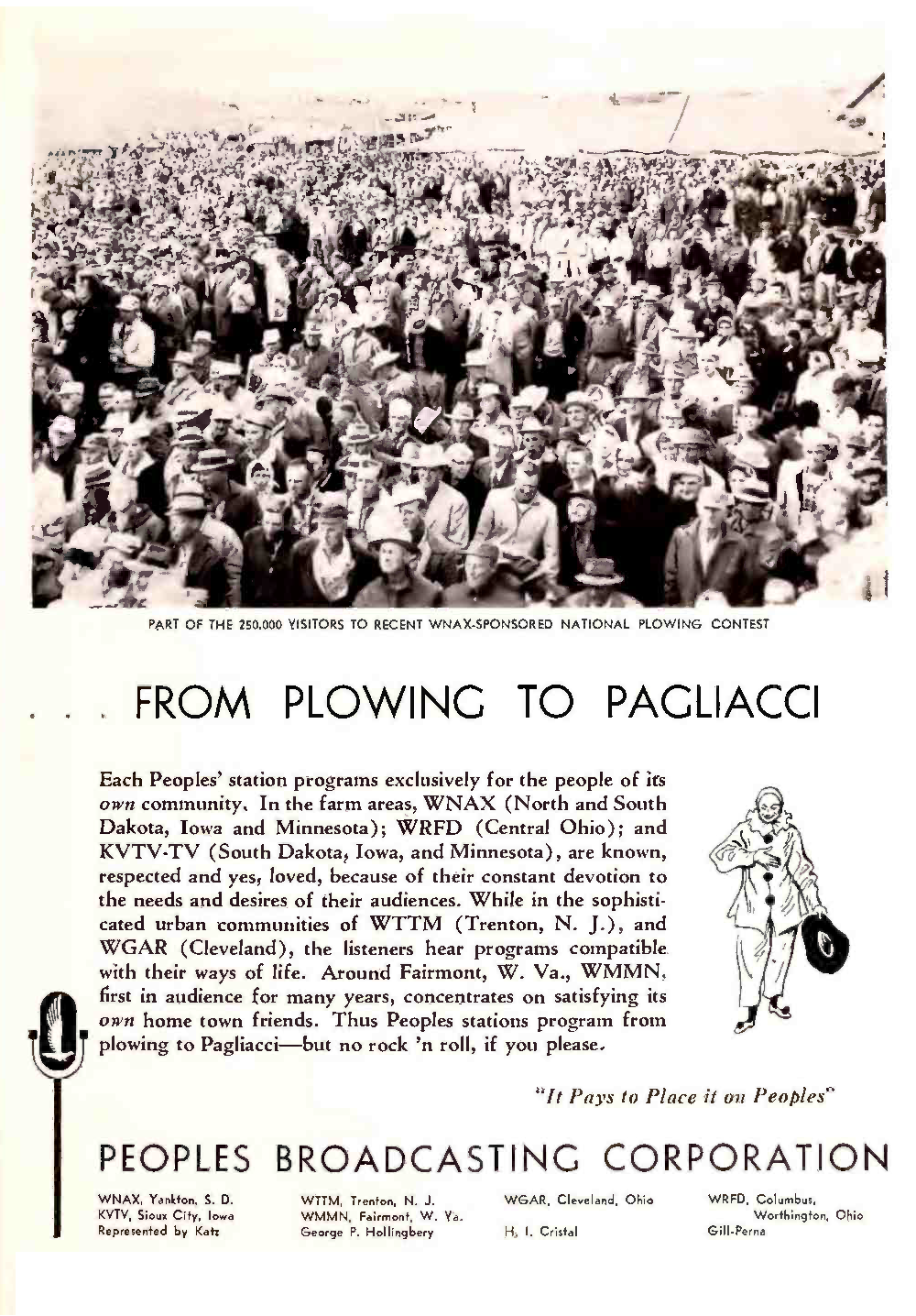
Advertisement for Peoples Broadcasting Corporation, later known as Nationwide Communications Inc., a subsidiary of the Nationwide Mutual Insurance Company (Note the Nationwide "eagle" logo inside the Peoples microphone logo)

In late 1957, Cowles sold WNAX and KVTV to the Peoples Broadcasting Corporation, a subsidiary of Nationwide Mutual Insurance Company, for $3 million. KVTV began producing a regular series of bowling telecasts in conjunction with KELO-TV of Sioux Falls, South Dakota. The Big Bowl, which was produced in Sioux City and aired until 1973, featured competitors from the two cities facing off against each other and was credited with increasing bowling's popularity regionally. Also under Peoples, the station erected its first weather ball atop the Badgerow Building, which remained in place until it was destroyed in a 1973 windstorm.

=== Forward ownership ===
In 1965, Peoples sold KVTV to the Wisconsin Valley Television Company of Wausau, Wisconsin, owner of WSAU AM-FM-TV in Wausau and WMTV in Madison. That December, after seven years of joint work and the withdrawal of an objection by KQTV in Fort Dodge, KVTV moved to a new tower near Hinton, Iowa, that it co-owned with KTIV. The former tower was dismantled; the land was sold to the Sioux City school system to build North High School, and the antenna was gifted to South Dakota Educational Television, which used it as a backup for its KBHE in Rapid City.

Bigger changes were in store beyond a new tower. In 1967, Forward Communications—which changed its name from Wisconsin Valley at the start of the year owing to its expansion outside the state—changed the station's call letters to KCAU-TV to "reflect the new character of the station" and switched network affiliation from CBS to ABC. At the time, neither Sioux City nor Sioux Falls had an ABC affiliate. With Sioux Falls CBS affiliate KELO-TV about to activate a 2,000-foot tower of its own and other nearby stations airing CBS, Forward concluded there would be a larger audience for an ABC station. The station advertised in the Argus Leader in Sioux Falls, staking a claim to be the ABC affiliate for both Sioux City and Sioux Falls.

While Sioux City viewers would turn to new station KMEG-TV (channel 14), originally planned as an ABC affiliate, for their CBS programs, the Forward ownership and affiliation switch ushered in the strongest years in station history, living up to the "Major 9" moniker adopted around the same time. William F. Turner served as general manager of KCAU-TV from 1966 to 1985, and the station spent most of that time as the market leader in Sioux City; at its height, it had a nearly 2-to-1 ratings lead over KTIV. KCAU-TV also had a large audience in Sioux Falls, where the only other receivable ABC affiliate was KORN-TV/KXON-TV/KDLT in Mitchell, South Dakota. However, the station started to lose ground in the early 1980s in large part because of an affiliation switch in Sioux Falls. When ABC moved its Sioux Falls affiliation to KSFY-TV in 1983, the factor that gave KCAU-TV a ratings advantage disappeared, and KTIV—which had been improving its coverage steadily for several years—surged past KCAU-TV for first place. Forward Communications was sold in late 1984 to Wesray Capital Corporation, which retained the Forward name for its media holdings.

=== Citadel ownership ===
Wesray intended all along to sell some of Forward's television properties and its four radio stations, and KCAU-TV was the first to find a buyer. In July 1985, KCAU-TV was purchased for $14 million by Citadel Communications, a company owned by Phil Lombardo. General manager Turner exited, receiving a standing ovation from staff. Days after closing on the purchase, Lombardo put his stamp on the station on November 18, 1985, firing 22 staffers in what a front-page headline of the Sioux City Journal termed a "purge" of a third of the staff; he was reported to have called KCAU-TV "hemorrhaging" and in need of "major surgery". Among those to lose their jobs was Jim Henry; Canyon Kid's Corner, by then a weekly show, was canceled after 32 years on the air and more than 70,000 guests.

Citadel sought to expand KCAU-TV's circulation to the southwest. In 1986, the company acquired KBGT-TV, a struggling independent station in Albion, Nebraska, from the Amaturo Group, and converted it into a satellite station as KCAN (call letters that matched KCAU-TV and also reflected the major cities served of Columbus, Albion, and Norfolk). The FCC approved the deal because it agreed with Citadel's contention that Albion could not support its own TV station, and ABC approved extending the affiliation because some of the households reached by its transmitter did not receive ABC from another station. The deal, which would add 463,000 viewers to the station's potential audience, did not include KBGT's satellite studio in Lincoln, Nebraska.

KCAN continued as a complement to KCAU-TV for more than a decade, but beginning in 1991, Citadel began efforts to move the station south to Lincoln, which only had one full-service commercial TV station. A new UHF station would replace it at Albion. KOLN, the existing commercial station in Lincoln, and several stations in Omaha challenged the proposal, but the FCC gave initial approval in April 1993 and final approval in June 1995. It became a standalone station, KLKN, on April 1, 1996.

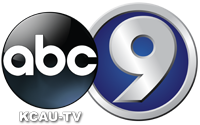
Logo during Citadel ownership from 2006 to 2017

KCAU-TV was the initial advertising sales and marketing partner for the local The WB 100+ Station Group station, "KXWB", when it launched in 1998. However, KXWB was not carried on Cable One's Sioux City system. In October 1999, when The WB removed its programming from Superstation WGN, WB CEO Jamie Kellner and two of the network's stars visited town to lobby for the addition of KXWB to the local cable lineup. Cable One did not add "KXWB" to its lineup until October 2001, when it agreed to begin carriage of WB 100+ services on its cable systems. On January 1, 2003, KTIV assumed ad sales responsibility for "KXWB".

=== Nexstar ownership ===
On September 16, 2013, Citadel announced that it would sell KCAU-TV, along with WOI-DT in Des Moines and WHBF-TV in Rock Island, Illinois, to the Nexstar Broadcasting Group for $88 million. Nexstar immediately took over the station's operations through a time brokerage agreement. The deal separated KCAU from KLKN, which Citadel retained. Citadel's sale of the three stations followed Phil Lombardo's decision to "slow down", as well as a desire by Lynch Entertainment, an investor in WOI and WHBF, to sell. The sale was completed on March 13, 2014.

Soon after the acquisition, the new ownership deemed the downtown studio inadequate for the station's needs and began a search for a new site. In February 2017, the station relocated to a state-of-the-art facility located on the city's east side.

== News operation ==
Citadel's first priority upon taking ownership of KCAU-TV in 1985 was to stabilize the newsroom. It was able to lure popular anchor Greg Lund back to the market from a job in Little Rock, Arkansas, in 1986. A decline in agricultural advertising and the difficulties of airing a noon newscast for an ABC station in the Central Time Zone prompted the station to shelve its midday news in 1987. A local 5 p.m. newscast was added in 1999.

In 1994, popular weather presenter Tom Peterson died in a car crash in Minnesota. Some 1,000 people attended his funeral. The station also revived the weather ball in 1995, this time atop the Terra Centre (now Ho-Chunk Centre) office building.

=== Notable former on-air staff ===
- John Behring
- Ron Clements
- Gene Sherman
- Kent Shocknek

== Technical information ==
=== Subchannels ===
KCAU-TV's transmitter is located near Hinton, Iowa. The station's signal is multiplexed:

Subchannels of KCAU-TV
Subchannel	Res.	Short name	Programming
9.1	720p	KCAU-TV	ABC
9.2	480i	Escape	Ion Mystery
9.3	480i	Laff	Laff
9.4	480i	Bounce	Bounce TV

At the start of July 2021, Flood Communications, the owner of the low-power News Channel Nebraska system, began to simulcast KCAU's main channel as a subchannel of KNEN-LD (channel 35), which serves Norfolk, Nebraska.

=== Analog-to-digital conversion ===
KCAU-TV shut down its analog signal, over VHF channel 9, at noon on February 17, 2009, which had been the official date of the federally mandated transition from analog to digital television until it was changed earlier that month to June 12. The station's digital transmissions moved from UHF channel 30 to channel 9.

== See also ==
- List of masts
