= Citadel Communications =

American media company

Citadel Communications Ltd.
- Type: Private
- Industry: Broadcast Television; Television Production
- Founded: 1982
- Defunct: 2023
- Fate: Last remaining station sold to Nexstar Media Group
- Headquarters: Bronxville, New York
- Area served: United States (Southeast)
- Key people: Philip J. Lombardo (founder/CEO); Ray Cole (president/COO); Jeffrey Lombardo (vice president)
- Products: Broadcast television
- Website: www.citadelltd.com

Citadel Communications Ltd. was an American private broadcasting company. It was based in Bronxville, New York and most recently owned 1 low-power television station on which it operated a regional 24-hour cable news channel.

== History ==
The company was founded in 1982 by former National Association of Broadcasters joint board chairman and current Broadcasters Foundation of America chairman Phil Lombardo.

Upon completion of the Digital TV transition in 2009, Citadel's stations at that time returned their digital broadcasts to their former analog channel assignments in the VHF spectrum. As a result of poor propagation characteristics for digital TV in the VHF bands, these stations now operate low-power digital fill-in translators in the UHF band to improve coverage in their communities of license. See the digital TV section on the WHBF-TV entry for further information on the Citadel stations' post-transition digital signals.

In February 2009, Phil Lombardo became an investing partner in LDB Media, LLC., owners of the Suncoast News Network, a regional cable news channel in Sarasota, Florida. In January 2014, Lombardo and Citadel purchased a majority interest in the company. As a result, Citadel took over broadcast operations of SNN and integrated the channel with its other stations.

On September 16, 2013, Citadel announced that it would sell WOI-DT, KCAU-TV, and WHBF-TV to the Nexstar Broadcasting Group for $88 million. Nexstar immediately took over the stations' operations through a time brokerage agreement. The deal followed Phil Lombardo's decision to "slow down," as well as a desire by Lynch Entertainment to divest its investments in WOI and WHBF. Citadel continued to own KLKN, WLNE-TV, and its Sarasota properties. On March 5, 2014, the Federal Communications Commission approved the sale of these stations to Nexstar outright and the deal was completed on March 13.

On May 16, 2019, it was announced that Standard Media, led by former Young Broadcasting and Media General executive Deb McDermott, would acquire Citadel's WLNE and KLKN for $83 million. The sale was completed on September 5.

On May 19, 2023, Citadel Communications COO Ray Cole announced that WSNN-LD would be sold to Nexstar Media Group (owner of local NBC affiliate WFLA-TV and MyNetworkTV affiliate (now CW O&O) WTTA in the Tampa Bay Area) for $1 million. The sale was completed on July 20, completing the wind-down of its operations outside remaining SEC and IRS disclosures.

== Former stations ==
- Stations are arranged in alphabetical order by state and city of license.

Stations owned by Citadel Communications
Media market	State	Station	Purchased	Sold	Notes
Sarasota–Tampa	Florida	WSNN-LD	2011	2023	
Rock Island	Illinois	WHBF-TV	1987	2014	
Ames–Des Moines	Iowa	WOI-DT	1994	2014	
Sioux City	Iowa	KCAU-TV	1985	2014	
Albion	Nebraska	KLKE	1996	2003	(Note: Satellite of KLKN.)
Lincoln	Nebraska	KLKN	1986	2019	
Binghamton	New York	WMGC-TV	1986	1996	
Buffalo	New York	WUTV	1984	1990	
Providence	Rhode Island	WLNE-TV	2011	2019	
Burlington	Vermont	WVNY	1982	1996	
