= 102.9 FM =

FM radio frequency

The following radio stations broadcast on FM frequency 102.9 MHz:

== Argentina ==
- LRA314 Nacional in Santa Fe de la Vera Cruz, Santa Fe
- Radio María in Resistencia, Chaco

== Australia ==
- ABC Goulburn Murray in Alexandra, Victoria
- CAAMA in Coober Pedy, South Australia
- 4HTB in Gold Coast, Queensland
- 2KKO in Newcastle, New South Wales
- Radio National in Broken Hill, New South Wales
- Radio National in Mackay, Queensland
- SBS Radio in Cootamundra, New South Wales
- Vision Radio Network in Horsham, Victoria
- 2ST Southern Highlands - Bowral, New South Wales

== Burundi ==
- RTNB in Bujumbura, Burundi

== Canada (Channel 275) ==
- CBXR-FM in Fort Fraser, British Columbia
- CBYB-FM in Port Clements, British Columbia
- CFGW-FM-2 in Wapella, Saskatchewan
- CFMO-FM in Collingwood, Ontario
- CFOI-FM-1 in St-Jerome, Quebec
- CFOM-FM in Levis, Quebec
- CHCR-FM in Killaloe, Ontario
- CHDI-FM in Edmonton, Alberta
- CHDR-FM in Cranbrook, British Columbia
- CIAM-FM-1 in Red Earth, Alberta
- CIWS-FM in Stouffville, Ontario
- CJOI-FM in Rimouski, Quebec
- CJOR-FM in Oliver, British Columbia
- CKBB-FM in Sudbury, Ontario-(defunct)
- CKBZ-FM-4 in Clearwater, British Columbia
- CKLH-FM in Hamilton, Ontario
- CKMA-FM-1 in Neguac, New Brunswick
- CKRP-FM-1 in Nampa, Alberta
- VF2583 in Havre St-Pierre, Quebec

== China ==
- CNR The Voice of China in Chaoyang, Tianjin and Yan'an

== Malaysia ==
- Kelantan FM in Kota Bharu, Kelantan
- Perlis FM in Perlis
- TraXX FM in Johor Bahru, Johor and Singapore

== Mexico ==
- XHCAY-FM in Acayucan, Veracruz
- XHCRG-FM in Ciudad Camargo, Chihuahua
- XHCSBY-FM in Ciudad Valles, San Luis Potosí
- XHEY-FM in Calvillo, Aguascalientes
- XHMG-FM in Monterrey, Nuevo León
- XHNC-FM in Celaya, Guanajuato
- XHRI-FM in Reynosa, Tamaulipas
- XHRPU-FM in Durango, Durango
- XHSCBI-FM in Villahermosa, Tabasco
- XHSCC-FM in San Cristóbal de las Casas, Chiapas
- XHSPRC-FM in Colima, Colima
- XHTNO-FM in Tulancingo, Hidalgo
- XHTOL-FM in Ixtlahuaca, Estado de México
- XHTQE-FM in Tenosique, Tabasco
- XHTS-FM in Veracruz, Veracruz
- XHUIZ-FM in Melchor Múzquiz, Coahuila
- XHVACM-FM in Cuernavaca, Morelos
- XHWJ-FM in Tehuacán, Puebla
- XHXAN-FM in Tacámbaro, Michoacán
- XHYN-FM in Oaxaca, Oaxaca

== Philippines ==
- DWYD-FM in Daet, Carmarines Norte
- DYMN-FM in Carcar City, Cebu

== South Africa ==
- Star FM

== United Kingdom ==
- Hits Radio Coventry & Warwickshire in South Warwickshire
- Q Radio in Derry, Northern Ireland
- Heart South in Basingstoke and Whitchurch
- Nation Radio Wales in Carmarthenshire

== United States (Channel 275) ==
- KADL in Imperial, Nebraska
- KAJN in Crowley, Louisiana
- KARN-FM in Sheridan, Arkansas
- KARS-FM in Laramie, Wyoming
- KBIK in Independence, Kansas
- KBLX in Berkeley, California
- KBRX in O'Neill, Nebraska
- KBWS in Sisseton, South Dakota
- KCTR in Billings, Montana
- KCUT-LP in Moab, Utah
- KDIF-LP in Phoenix, Arizona
- KDMX in Dallas, Texas
- KDPT-LP in Dos Palos, California
- KEFA-LP in Wenatchee, Washington
- KEZS in Cape Girardeau, Missouri
- KFLO-LP in Jonesboro, Arkansas
- KHBZ in Harrison, Arkansas
- KHKO in Prairie City, Oregon
- KHUT in Hutchinson, Kansas
- KISH in Agana, Guam
- KITY in Llano, Texas
- KIWI in McFarland, California
- KIXN in Hobbs, New Mexico
- KJFA-FM in Pecos, New Mexico
- KLOI-LP in Lopez Island, Washington
- KLQV in San Diego, California
- KLTN in Houston, Texas
- KMEZ in Belle Chasse, Louisiana
- KMMO-FM in Marshall, Missouri
- KMNB in Minneapolis, Minnesota
- KNDA in Alice, Texas
- KNFT-FM in Bayard, New Mexico
- KOLZ in Kirtland, New Mexico
- KOUW in Island Park, Idaho
- KOZR-LP in Gentry, Arkansas
- KPIM-LP in Broken Arrow, Oklahoma
- KPOG-LP in Grimes, Iowa
- KQIB in Idabel, Oklahoma
- KQST in Sedona, Arizona
- KRFG in Nashwauk, Minnesota
- KSJJ in Redmond, Oregon
- KTFG in Sioux Rapids, Iowa
- KTOP-FM in Saint Marys, Kansas
- KVAB in Clarkston, Washington
- KVIO-LP in Lubbock, Texas
- KVMA in Shreveport, Louisiana
- KVWE in Amarillo, Texas
- KWGO in Burlington, North Dakota
- KWGR-LP in Wichita Falls, Texas
- KWYL in South Lake Tahoe, California
- KXLM in Oxnard, California
- KXOK-LP in St. Louis, Missouri
- KZIA in Cedar Rapids, Iowa
- KZTM in McKenna, Washington
- KZWS-LP in Davis, California
- WAUH in Wautoma, Wisconsin
- WBCA-LP in Boston, Massachusetts
- WBEI-LP in Charleston, South Carolina
- WBLM in Portland, Maine
- WBNU-LP in Framingham, Massachusetts
- WBOO in Reedsburg, Wisconsin
- WBPG-LP in Dorchester, Massachusetts
- WBUZ (FM) in La Vergne, Tennessee
- WBWO-LP in Moundsville, West Virginia
- WCRQ in Dennysville, Maine
- WDHT in Springfield, Ohio
- WDIN in Camuy, Puerto Rico
- WDRC in Hartford, Connecticut
- WDUN-FM in Clarkesville, Georgia
- WELS in Kinston, North Carolina
- WEXP in Westport, New York
- WEZI in Jacksonville, Florida
- WFMA in Marion, Alabama
- WFPR-LP in Franklin, Massachusetts
- WHQG in Milwaukee, Wisconsin
- WIEB-LP in Ocala, Florida
- WJCI in Huntington, Indiana
- WJGO in Tice, Florida
- WKIK in California, Maryland
- WKIX in Raleigh, North Carolina
- WKQB in Welch, West Virginia
- WKXX in Attalla, Alabama
- WKYW-LP in Keyser, West Virginia
- WLAS-LP in Auburndale, Massachusetts
- WLKO in Hickory, North Carolina
- WLKS in West Liberty, Kentucky
- WLLO-LP in Londonderry, New Hampshire
- WLOJ-LP in Calhoun, Georgia
- WLPP-LP in Palenville, New York
- WLTK in New Market, Virginia
- WMGK in Philadelphia, Pennsylvania
- WMHR in Syracuse, New York
- WMKB (FM) in Earlville, Illinois
- WMKC in Indian River, Michigan
- WMSI in Jackson, Mississippi
- WMUU-LP in Madison, Wisconsin
- WNCQ in Canton, New York
- WOKW in Curwensville, Pennsylvania
- WOWI in Norfolk, Virginia
- WPBK in Crab Orchard, Kentucky
- WPCG-LP in Canton, Georgia
- WPXC in Hyannis, Massachusetts
- WQBH-LP in St. Joseph, Michigan
- WQIN-LP in Quincy, Illinois
- WQKI in Orangeburg, South Carolina
- WQTS in Statesboro, Georgia
- WRZO-LP in Chambersburg, Pennsylvania
- WSOY in Decatur, Illinois
- WVDP-LP in Templeton, Massachusetts
- WVRK in Columbus, Georgia
- WWKJ-LP in Peoria, Illinois
- WWMR in Saltillo, Mississippi
- WWWW in Ann Arbor, Michigan
- WXCH in Hope, Indiana
- WXXB in Delphi, Indiana
- WYFM in Sharon, Pennsylvania
- WYHA in Grand Rapids, Michigan
- WZEU-LP in Weeki Wachee, Florida
- WZTF in Scranton, South Carolina

== Vietnam ==
- Quang Ngai FM in Quang Ngai Province
