= WVJP =

WVJP may refer to:

- WVJP (AM), a radio station (1110 AM) licensed to Caguas, Puerto Rico
- WVJP-FM, a radio station (103.3 FM) licensed to Caguas, Puerto Rico
