= WOCB =

WOCB may refer to:

- WOCB-CD, a television station (channel 22, virtual 39) licensed to serve Marion, Ohio, United States
- WGTX (AM), a radio station (A.M. 1240) licensed to West Yarmouth, Cape Cod, Massachusetts, which held the WOCB callsign from the 1940s-1990s.
- WXTK, a radio station (95.1 FM) licensed to serve West Yarmouth, Massachusetts, United States, which held the call sign WOCB-FM in 1991
