= John Garabedian =

American broadcaster

- Born: December 20, 1941 (age 84); Cambridge, Massachusetts, U.S.
- Other name: Johnny Gardner
- Education: University of Miami
- Occupation: Disc jockey
- Years active: 1958 – present
- Known for: Open House Party
- Awards: Massachusetts Broadcasters Hall of Fame (2014)

John Hood Garabedian (born December 20, 1941) is an American radio personality and disc jockey. He is best known as the creator and former long-time host of Open House Party. He has been involved in Massachusetts radio and television stations for more than 50 years. In 2013, he was awarded "Broadcaster of the Year" for the Massachusetts Broadcasters Association, and in 2014, inducted into the Massachusetts Broadcasters Hall of Fame. He is currently the President of Jamchannel, a syndication company that produces Liveline hosted by Mason Kelter, a live national weeknight show for Top 40 stations.

== Career ==
=== Early work ===
At the age of 17, Garabedian joined Worcester station WORC as a disc jockey. Several years after joining, he became a co-host of the original Open House Party radio program, which was the all-request afternoon show at the time. By 1971, Garabedian was a program director at WMEX, and worked with well-known Boston-area disc jockey Arnie "Woo-Woo" Ginsburg.

In 1969, Garabedian and partners founded WGTR (now WQOM) as a top-40 station serving Boston’s western suburbs from Natick. About a decade later, he and his partners added a second station, broadcasting from Nantucket, WGTF-FM (which eventually became WEII).

From 1980 to 1984, Garabedian was a weekend DJ on progressive rock outlet WBCN in Boston and often dubbed as "John Gara B-C-N".

=== 1980s (V66 & the launch of Open House Party) ===
Four years after MTV's 1981 debut, Garabedian and fellow WMEX alumnus Arnie Ginsburg started a Boston-area 24-hour music video station, WVJV-TV (now WUNI). Their station, known as "V66", mirrored MTV's early all-video format and lasted until 1986, when WVJV phased out videos and was sold to the Home Shopping Network. "Life On The V: The Story Of V66" is a documentary released in 2014, about the channel.

Following the end of his first television venture, Garabedian returned to radio. In 1987, Garabedian restarted the Open House Party show as a Saturday and Sunday evening, all-request program on Boston station WXKS-FM. Over the next twenty years, the program grew into a nationally syndicated show, broadcast on over 175 stations worldwide.

Garabedian also founded Superadio Networks and Radiocraft. Superadio was created in 1988 as a distributor for Open House Party; it handled affiliate relations, sales and syndication, while Radiocraft owned and produced the show. Superadio became the largest distributor of mix shows in the world, while Open House Party was a ratings-success in almost every major market in America.

=== 2000s–2018 (sale of Superadio, launch of XY.tv, end of Open House Party) ===
In 2001, Garabedian sold Superadio to Access One Communications, but kept ownership of Open House Party under Radiocraft. He also launched multiple 24-hour satellite networks, including City-FM in 1991, which he sold a few years later. In the late 1990s, he created a weeknight show, similar to Open House Party, called All Nite Café (hosted by Matthew Reid), which evolved to Romeo's Playhouse, (hosted by WXKS-FM (Kiss 108) afternoon DJ Romeo, then Party Playhouse with Jackson Blue after Romeo's departure in 2008. In 2009, Garabedian and Blue launched a four-hour weekly program titled Celebrity Top 10 Countdown, which Blue hosted until 2018. Garabedian owned all three programs (Party Playhouse, Celebrity Top 10 and OHP) under Radiocraft, but they were distributed through Superadio until 2009, followed by Westwood One until 2011. Then, Garabedian used Radiocraft to distribute the three programs himself, until 2013, when he sold all assets of Radiocraft (which included the three shows) to United Stations Radio Networks. Garabedian's Radiocraft, was then phased out completely. Part of USRN's purchase agreement was that he would continue to host Open House Party for four years.

In 2003, while still running Superadio and hosting Open House Party Saturday, 18 years after the start of V66, Garabedian founded his second television station, XY.tv, with music and youth-oriented programming. It cost $10 million to launch the station, and while the channel found cable distributors, it ceased operations in 2006.

On April 16, 2016, Garabedian announced live on Open House Party that his memoir titled The Harmony of Parts would be released on October 3, 2016. The book details his whole life up until that time and is described as "the perfect book if you're into radio, sex, drugs, and rock n' roll!"

A movie about Garabedian and Open House Party began filming in 2016, with production currently in progress and a release date unknown. The documentary is directed by Darren Rockwell who was a frequent visitor to the OHP studio throughout the late 1990s – early 2000s, when the show was peaking in popularity. The film is called Be Your Dream: The Story of John Garabedian & The Open House Party and will feature one-on-one interviews with many of the show's past and present employees, celebrities and listeners, along with pictures and audio from the show.

On October 25, 2016, it was announced that John Garabedian would not return as the host of Open House Party in 2017. After creating and hosting the show since 1987, Garabedian sold it to United Stations in 2012. He said in a press release: "When I sold Open House Party to United Stations four years ago, they required me to host for four more years. That expires at midnight this New Year's Eve. Though they were surprised I declined to renew, I explained that I had one major life achievement I had yet to accomplish and needed space to do it." On December 17, 2016, Garabedian announced on air that United Stations had not found anyone to replace him yet and asked him to stay until the end of January 2017, which he agreed to do. His final show aired on January 28, 2017.

On January 5, 2017, it was announced that Sunday night host Kannon would inherit the Saturday show as well. In November 2021, Hot 106.7 WNFN Nashville DJ Joe Breezy was named the new host of Sunday night.

On May 14, 2018, he was nominated for the National Radio Hall of Fame in the category "Longstanding Network/Syndicated Personality (20+ years)" for his 29-year run on Open House Party.

=== 2018–present (launch of Jamchannel and Liveline) ===
After leaving Open House Party, Garabedian started his next project, Jamchannel, an Internet radio station that plays Top 40/Pop music and capitalizes on many of the things that made OHP successful: interviews, listener interaction, live in-studio audience and music that branded as "the world's biggest hits!". The idea was to sell Jamchannel to a major streaming company such as Spotify, YouTube, or Amazon to compete with something like Apple's Beats 1. After many attempts to convince companies that the concept of Jamchannel was the future of radio and streaming, Garabedian ultimately scrapped the idea, though it still streams 24/7, and he voice-tracked weekly shows for a period of time, while occasionally hosting live shows in his classic time slot of 7 p.m. to midnight (ET) on Saturday night.

In February 2020, Garabedian began working on a national Top 40 weeknight show called Liveline hosted by Mason Kelter. Again, embracing many of the things that Open House Party was popular for in the Garabedian-era. The show is completely live and debuted on April 18, 2020, on Garabedian's Cape Cod CHR station Y101, replacing Open House Party with Kannon, which had been on Y101 since its launch in 2013. Garabedian hosted a weekend version of the show from May 23, 2020, until July 31, 2021, which marked the first time he had been on FM radio since the final Open House Party in January 2017, aside from one fill-in shift he did on his Cape Cod rock station Pixy 103 in February 2019. Liveline is now syndicated in over 60 markets every night.

=== Ownership ===
Garabedian was the president of CodComm Inc. and owned four radio stations on Cape Cod: WFRQ, WHYA, WKFY, and WPXC. He bought them in 2012 and sold them in November 2021.

In January 2024, Garabedian purchased WJIB and translator 101.3 W267CE in Cambridge, Massachusetts, from the estate of former owner Bob Bittner.

== Personal life ==
Garabedian graduated from Weston High School in 1959 and briefly attended the University of Miami. As of 2012, he owned residences in Southborough, Massachusetts; Falmouth, Massachusetts; and Cabot, Vermont.

Garabedian is the president of the Cape Area Pilots Association (CAPA). Formed in 1995, the association works to promote area aviation and safety, and provides scholarships to local aviation students.
