= WGTX =

WGTX may refer to:

- WGTX (AM), a radio station (1240 AM) licensed to serve West Yarmouth, Massachusetts, United States
- WGTX-FM, a radio station (102.3 FM) licensed to serve Truro, Massachusetts
- WDSP, a radio station (1280 AM) formerly licensed to serve DeFuniak Springs, Florida, United States, which held the call sign WGTX from 1969 to 2006
