= WHYA =

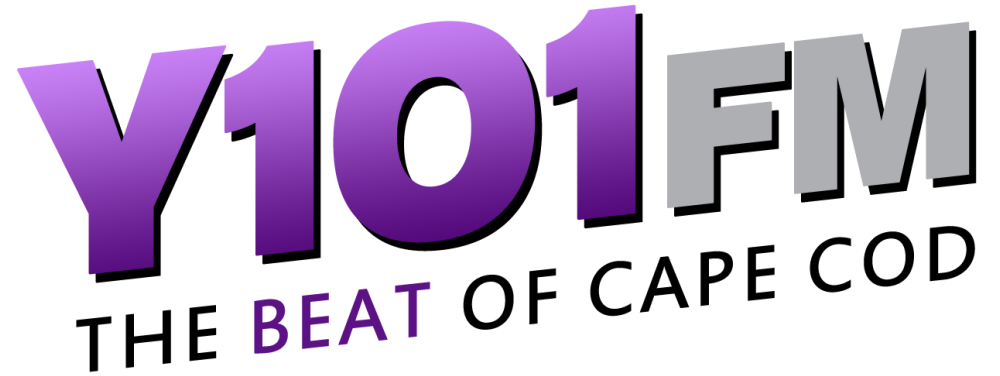
- Mashpee, Massachusetts; United States
- Broadcast area: Cape Cod–Hyannis, Massachusetts
- Frequency: 101.1 MHz
- Branding: Y101

Programming
- Format: Contemporary hit radio
- Affiliations: Premiere Networks

Ownership
- Owner: Steve Chessare; (Coxswain Media LLC)
- Sister stations: WFRQ; WKFY; WPXC

History
- First air date: February 12, 1987; 39 years ago
- Former call signs: WFAL (1987–1995); WUNZ (1995–1996); WWKJ (1996–2001); WTWV (2001–2006); WFRQ (2006–2012)
- Call sign meaning: Hyannis

Technical information
- Licensing authority: FCC
- Facility ID: 29571
- Class: A
- ERP: 2,900 watts
- HAAT: 141.3 meters (464 ft)
- Transmitter coordinates: 41°41′20.4″N 70°20′47.1″W

Links
- Public license information: Public file; LMS
- Webcast: Listen live
- Website: www.y101capecod.com

WHYA (101.1 FM) — branded Y101 — is a Top 40 radio station licensed to Mashpee, Massachusetts, owned by Steve Chessare through Coxswain Communications, Inc. The station's studios are in downtown Hyannis and its transmitter is located in West Barnstable. WHYA airs syndicated programs like Elvis Duran and was the first affiliate of Liveline with Mason Kelter. It also ran Open House Party on Saturday and Sunday nights from the station's launch until March 2020.

== History ==
On April 1, 2013, at 5:00 pm, WHYA broke away from its simulcast with 93.5 WFRQ and began stunting with an automated countdown. A male text-to-speech voice (Microsoft Sam) repeated a sequence of counting backward in the format of "T minus x days, x hours, x minutes, x seconds" (beginning with 2 days, 18 hours).

A rotating list of statements was also inserted approximately every fifteen seconds. The statements ranged from informing listeners that Frank FM had moved to 93.5 and doubled its power, to random and sometimes amusing quotes from movies, songs and current events. Occasionally, some statements also hinted about two of the on-air personalities that would eventually be on the new station, including "Who's Steve McVie?" and "What's a Jackson Blue?"

On April 4, 2013, at 11:00 am, the station flipped to Top 40/CHR, branded as Y101. Y101's first song was "Party Rock Anthem" by LMFAO. The new format filled a 4-year void that the former WRZE ("96.3 The Rose", now WEII) left when it switched to sports radio on March 25, 2009. (In the interim, some Cape Cod market listeners could pick up CHRs from Providence, New Bedford-Fall River or Boston.) CodComm's founding fathers John Garabedian and Steve McVie both played a role in the former WRZE; Garabedian placed the original 96.3 transmission facility on the air in the 1970s (as WGTF) and WRZE was an affiliate of his Open House Party program, while McVie was the last on-air personality heard on WRZE.

On August 20, 2013, CodComm submitted a license application with the FCC to cover an outstanding construction permit originally filed on July 17, 2012. This completed a move of the WHYA transmission facility from Mashpee to Barnstable at the tower of sister station WPXC. The change included dropping power from 6 kW to 2.9 kW, but raising its antenna from 272' to 463' above average terrain.

Effective November 30, 2021, CodComm sold WHYA, sister stations WFRQ, WKFY, and WPXC, and three translators to Steve Chessare's Coxswain Communications for $3.2 million.
