= KNFT =

KNFT may refer to:

- KNFT (AM), a radio station (950 AM) licensed to Bayard, New Mexico, United States
- KNFT-FM, a radio station (102.9 FM) licensed to Bayard, New Mexico, United States
