= WBWO =

WBWO could refer to:

- WBWO-LP, a radio station (102.9 FM) licensed to Moundsville, West Virginia, United States
- WBWO, a cable-only affiliate of The CW, located in Wheeling, West Virginia, United States
