= WPXC =

WPXC may refer to:

- WPXC (FM), a radio station (102.9 FM) licensed to Hyannis, Massachusetts, United States
- WPXC-TV, a television station (channel 21 analog/24 digital) licensed to Brunswick, Georgia, United States
