= CILO-FM =

Multilingual radio station in Montreal

Coordinates: 45.5298°N 73.6596°W

CILO-FM is a low-power commercial multilingual radio station in Montreal, Quebec, Canada, focusing on the city's South-Asian diaspora community, with most of its programs in Tamil.

Operating at 102.9 MHz (FM), the station is owned and operated by AGNI Communications Inc., which received approval from the CRTC on May 16, 2014. The station broadcasts with an average ERP of 31 watts (maximum ERP of 50 watts with a directional antenna and an effective height of antenna above average terrain of 44.4 metres or 146 feet) from facilities near the intersection of Chabanel and Jean Pratt streets (near the intersection of A-15 and A-40) in the Ahuntsic-Cartierville borough of Montreal.

Its signal is hard to receive throughout all the Greater Montreal Area as it has strong interferences with CFOI-FM's 102.9 signal which is broadcast from Saint-Jérôme at 200 watts, it can only be heard clearly in the Villeray-Saint-Michel-Parc-Extension area as well as Ahunstic-Cartierville.
