= WXTK =

News/talk radio station in West Yarmouth, Massachusetts, United States

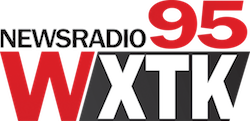
- West Yarmouth, Massachusetts; United States
- Broadcast area: Cape Cod; Hyannis
- Frequency: 95.1 MHz
- Branding: Newsradio 95 WXTK

Programming
- Format: News/Talk
- Network: Fox News Radio
- Affiliations: Premiere Networks; Boston Bruins Radio Network; Cape Cod Baseball League; New England Patriots Radio Network

Ownership
- Owner: iHeartMedia, Inc.; (iHM Licenses, LLC)
- Sister stations: WCIB; WCOD-FM; WEII

History
- First air date: May 2, 1948 (as WOCB-FM on 94.3)
- Former call signs: WOCB-FM (1948–1978); WSOX-FM (1978–1984); WRZE (1984–1985); WJFK (1985–1987); WOCB-FM (1987–1990); WJIB (1990–1991); WOCB-FM (1991)
- Former frequencies: 94.3 MHz (1948–1962); 94.9 MHz (1962–1997)
- Call sign meaning: "Extreme Talk" (proposed, but never used, station branding)

Technical information
- Licensing authority: FCC
- Facility ID: 6250
- Class: B
- ERP: 50,000 watts
- HAAT: 80 meters (260 ft)
- Transmitter coordinates: 41.635389°N 70.234750°W

Links
- Public license information: Public file; LMS
- Webcast: Listen live (via iHeartRadio)
- Website: 95wxtk.iheart.com

WXTK (95.1 FM; "Newsradio 95 WXTK") is a commercial radio station licensed to West Yarmouth, Massachusetts, and serving Cape Cod. It has a news/talk format and is owned by iHeartMedia, Inc. The studios and offices are on Barnstable Road in Hyannis, while the transmitter is on Radio Lane in Yarmouth. WXTK is the direct descendant of Cape Cod's first commercial radio station, WOCB.

Weekdays begin with a simulcast of The Jim Polito Show from co-owned WTAG in Worcester. Polito is followed by a local show hosted by Ed Lambert. The rest of the weekday schedule is from syndicated conservative talk programs: The Clay Travis and Buck Sexton Show, the Boston-based Howie Carr Show, The Sean Hannity Show and Coast to Coast AM with George Noory. Weekends feature shows on health, money, real estate, home repair, law, travel, gardening, technology and classic radio shows on Sunday nights. Weekend programs include The Kim Komando Show, The Paul Parent Garden Club, Armstrong & Getty, Rudy Maxa World Travel and Somewhere in Time with Art Bell. WXTK broadcasts New England Patriots football and Boston Bruins hockey games. Most hours begin with world and national news from Fox News Radio.

== History ==
=== Forerunner WOCB (AM) ===
WXTK is the direct descendant of Cape Cod's first commercial radio station, WOCB. The AM radio station WOCB first signed on the air on October 2, 1940. It was originally owned by the Cape Cod Broadcasting Company. It originally operated at 1210 kHz, but moved to 1240 in 1941 as a result of the North American Regional Broadcasting Agreement (NARBA).

WOCB shut down in May 1943 after running out of money, resulting in its license being canceled by the FCC on November 30. E. Anthony and Sons, owner of WNBH in New Bedford and publisher of the New Bedford Standard-Times and the Cape Cod Standard-Times, bought the station's equipment and relaunched WOCB under a new license on May 6, 1944, as an affiliate of the NBC Blue Network. WOCB carried the Blue Network's dramas, comedies, news, sports, soap operas, game shows and big band broadcasts during the "Golden Age of Radio". WOCB stayed with the Blue Network as it became ABC. When ABC broke into four sub-networks in 1968, WOCB AM and FM became affiliated with ABC's American Entertainment Network.

=== WOCB-FM signs on ===
WOCB-FM signed on the air on May 2, 1948, on 94.3 MHz. It was the Cape's first commercial FM station as well, mostly simulcasting the AM station. In 1962, it moved to 94.9 MHz. (The 94.3 frequency is now used on Cape Cod by WZAI, the Brewster repeater for WCAI.)

By the 1970s, WOCB-FM had broken away from simulcasting the AM during midday and evening hours to broadcast easy-listening music while still simulcasting the AM's format (then adult contemporary, with a heavy news commitment. It stayed with the AM station during weekday drive times and hourly newscasts the rest of the broadcast day. The FM call letters were changed to WSOX-FM in 1978. WRZE in 1984, WJFK in 1985, back to WOCB-FM in 1987, WJIB in 1990 (shortly after the call sign was dropped by 96.9 FM in Boston, now WBQT), and then WOCB-FM once more in 1991.

In the summer through winter of 1981, the afternoon drive announcer on WOCB was Edd Hall, who subsequently did voice work for Late Night with David Letterman from 1982 to 1990 and was the announcer on The Tonight Show with Jay Leno from 1992 to 2004.

=== Hurricane Bob ===
In 1991, Hurricane Bob blew down WOCB's transmitter tower, and the damage suffered was so severe that the owners could not afford to rebuild. The station was then sold to Ernie Boch Sr., an automobile dealer in the Boston suburb of Norwood, Massachusetts, who turned WOCB-FM into the flagship station for his new Boch Broadcasting company. The station's first news director, Hal Lamb, applied to the FCC to change the station's calls to WXTK, or "X-Talk", a reference to the rarity of the news/talk format on the FM dial at the time.

WXTK initially planned to brand it as "Extreme Talk", but did not do so, though a few station IDs were produced using the branding (as late as 1998, the unused IDs were still in the station archives). Despite this, WXTK went through with the change to news/talk, and secured several syndication agreements, including the right to broadcast The Rush Limbaugh Show. Limbaugh himself acknowledged his newest affiliate by remarking on-air, "I am now beaming into Kennedy compound." Over the next few years, the station also became the Cape's home of G. Gordon Liddy (cancelled from the station as of July 2006) and Howie Carr, and longtime local morning hosts Ed Lambert and Don McKeag.

Concurrent with the WXTK relaunch, WOCB's AM 1240 facility became WUOK. Under those call letters it programmed CNN Headline News, sports radio, and finally a WXTK simulcast. In 1997, Boch donated WUOK to Boston University for use as a relay of WBUR-FM in Boston, under the call sign WBUR (AM). AM 1240 now broadcasts as WGTX.

=== Change in frequency ===
WXTK's first logo after the frequency switch. Before the switch its branding was simply "94.9 WXTK" without an actual logo.

In July 1996, WXTK filed an application with the FCC to change frequencies from 94.9 to 95.1 MHz. The application was granted on May 20, 1997. The move was in response to listener complaints of co-channel interference (when two stations on the same frequency interfere with each other) from WHOM on Mount Washington.

The move took effect on-air on September 18, 1997; to ease people into the new frequency, there were two weeks of promotional material over-the-air, and after the switch its branding was changed to "95.1 is 95 WXTK", putting stress on the word "is". When WXTK moved to 95.1, it had to operate "directionally" with a signal limited towards WHRB in Cambridge.

=== Changes in ownership ===
WXTK's logo under Qantum Communications ownership

In 2005, Boch Broadcasting sold WXTK and its sister stations to Qantum Communications, owner of WRZE (now WEII, a simulcast of sports radio WEEI-FM) and WCIB. However, Qantum had to sell WTWV/WDVT (now WHYA and WFRQ) to Nassau Broadcasting in order to stay within FCC regulations. Until that sale, WOCB/WXTK had been broadcasting from the same studio building for over 60 years.

On May 15, 2014, Qantum Communications announced that it would sell its 29 stations, including WXTK, to Clear Channel Communications (now iHeartMedia), in a transaction connected to Clear Channel's sale of WALK AM-FM in Patchogue, New York, to Connoisseur Media via Qantum. The transaction was consummated on September 9, 2014.
