= KDIF =

KDIF may refer to:

- KDIF-LP, a low-power radio station (102.9 FM) licensed to serve Phoenix, Arizona, United States
- KFOO (AM), a radio station (1440 AM) licensed to serve Riverside, California, United States, which held the call sign KDIF from 1986 to 2010
