= XHSCBI-FM =

Community radio station in Villahermosa, Tabasco, Mexico

Villahermosa, Tabasco; Mexico
- Frequency: 102.9 FM
- Branding: Radio Grijalva

Programming
- Format: Community radio

Ownership
- Owner: Kahal Sembradores de Futuro, A.C.

History
- First air date: September 2019
- Call sign meaning: (templated callsign)

Technical information
- Class: A
- ERP: 2.93 kW
- HAAT: 24.4 m
- Transmitter coordinates: 17°58′56.28″N 92°54′27.94″W

Links
- Website: radiogrijalva.com

XHSCBI-FM is a community radio station on 102.9 FM in Villahermosa, Tabasco, Mexico. The station is owned by the civil association Kahal Sembradores de Futuro, A.C.

== History ==
Kahal Sembradores de Futuro filed for a community station on May 12, 2017. The station was approved on January 23, 2019.
