= XHSCC-FM =

Radio station in San Cristóbal de las Casas, Chiapas

- San Cristóbal de las Casas, Chiapas; Mexico
- Frequency: 102.9 MHz
- Branding: Somos Radio

Programming
- Format: Cultural

Ownership
- Owner: Impulsora Pro Cultura y Salud del Estado de Chiapas, A.C.
- Sister stations: XHITG-FM Tuxtla Gutiérrez

History
- First air date: March 6, 2013 (permit)
- Call sign meaning: San Cristóbal de las Casas

Technical information
- ERP: 3 kW
- HAAT: -5.04 m
- Transmitter coordinates: 16°44′03.2″N 92°38′33.4″W

Links
- Website: XHSCC-FM on Facebook

XHSCC-FM is a radio station broadcasting on 102.9 FM in San Cristóbal de las Casas, Chiapas in Mexico. The station is known as Somos Radio with a cultural format.

== History ==
XHSCC-FM was permitted on March 6, 2013, more than twelve years after it was applied for on October 13, 2000.
