= WCTK =

Country music radio station in the United States

- New Bedford, Massachusetts; United States
- Broadcast area: South Coast; Providence, Rhode Island; Cape Cod
- Frequency: 98.1 MHz (HD Radio)
- Branding: Cat Country 98.1

Programming
- Format: Country
- Subchannels: HD2: Classic hits (simulcast of WNBH)

Ownership
- Owner: John Fuller (Cat Country 98.1, Inc.)
- Sister stations: WNBH

History
- First air date: December 9, 1946 (as WFMR)
- Former call signs: WFMR (1946–1954); WNBH-FM (1954–1973); WMYS (1973–1989)

Technical information
- Licensing authority: FCC
- Facility ID: 25869
- Class: B
- ERP: 44,000 watts
- HAAT: 159 meters (522 ft)
- Transmitter coordinates: 41.623°N 70.918°W

Links
- Public license information: Public file; LMS
- Webcast: Listen live
- Website: www.catcountry.com

WCTK (98.1 FM, "Cat Country 98.1") is a country-formatted radio station in New Bedford, Massachusetts. The station covers much of southeastern New England, with studios in Providence, Rhode Island, and transmitter located south of New Bedford's downtown. The station is owned by John Fuller, doing business as Cat Country 98.1, Inc.

== History ==
WCTK was originally WFMR, and had an authorized power of 20 kilowatts. It went on the air December 9, 1946; during the inaugural program, Massachusetts governor Maurice J. Tobin said that WFMR was the first new FM station to sign on in New England after World War II. It became WNBH-FM on November 10, 1954, matching sister station WNBH (1340 AM). On September 17, 1973, WNBH-FM changed its callsign to WMYS, with an oldies and classic hits format. On July 28, 1989, the station switched formats to country followed by a call sign change to WCTK on August 24, 1989. First known as "Country 98.1 WCTK", the branding was changed to the current "Cat Country 98.1" in 1994. In 1997, the station moved its studios from New Bedford to the Roland Building in Providence to concentrate on fully serving the Providence Arbitron metro.

On February 1, 2019, WCTK began simulcasting on sister station WPVD (1450 AM) in West Warwick, Rhode Island, after that station dropped its ESPN Radio affiliation. The station also began broadcasting in HD, with a simulcast of sister station WNBH's newly-launched classic hits format (Big 101.3) on its HD2 sub-channel.

In July 2026, owners Hall Communications sold WCTK and sister station WNBH to John Fuller, doing business as Cat Country 98.1, Inc.
