= XHXAN-FM =

Community radio station in Tacámbaro, Michoacán, Mexico

Tacámbaro, Michoacán; Mexico
- Frequency: 102.9 FM
- Branding: Xanarapani Radio

Programming
- Format: Community

Ownership
- Owner: Xanarapani Tacámbaro, A.C.

History
- First air date: Late 2017
- Call sign meaning: XANarapani Tacámbaro

Technical information
- Class: A
- ERP: 1.8 kW
- HAAT: -103.9 m
- Transmitter coordinates: 19°13′58.7″N 101°27′36.4″W

Links
- Website: XHXAN-FM on Facebook

XHXAN-FM is a community radio station on 102.9 FM in Tacámbaro, Michoacán, Mexico. It is known as Xanarapani Radio.

== History ==
XHXAN received its concession on November 27, 2017, moving to 102.9 after previously being an unlicensed station on 90.7. Xanarapani Tacámbaro is controlled by Juan Ignacio Cancino García, a businessman who provides lighting and sound systems for events.
