= XHEY-FM =

Radio station in Aguascalientes, Aguascalientes, Mexico

- El Sauz-Calvillo-Aguascalientes, Aguascalientes; Mexico
- Broadcast area: Aguascalientes, Aguascalientes
- Frequency: 102.9 FM
- Branding: La Kaliente

Programming
- Format: Regional Mexican

Ownership
- Owner: Grupo Radiofónico ZER; (Josefina Reyes Sahagún)

History
- First air date: May 23, 1977 (concession)
- Former frequencies: 660 kHz

Technical information
- Licensing authority: CRT
- Class: B
- ERP: 50 kW
- HAAT: 84.91 meters (278.6 ft)
- Transmitter coordinates: 21°55′12″N 102°15′47″W

Links
- Webcast: Listen live
- Website: grupozer.mx

XHEY-FM is a radio station on 102.9 FM in Aguascalientes, Aguascalientes, Mexico. The station is owned by Grupo Radiofónico Zer and carries a regional Mexican format known as La Kaliente.

The transmitter is located in Aguascalientes, but the station has been variously described as being in Calvillo or El Sauz.

== History ==
XHEY began as XEEY-AM 660 in Jalpa, Zacatecas, with a concession awarded to Edmundo Llamas Félix on May 23, 1977. In 1986, it was sold to Josefina Reyes Sahagún, and in the 1990s, it moved to Aguascalientes, increasing its daytime power from 5 kW to 20.

XEEY received approval to migrate to FM in April 2012. At that time, it dropped its La Consentida romantic format. In 2018, it was approved to double its ERP to 50 kW.
