= WCIB =

- Falmouth, Massachusetts; United States
- Broadcast area: Cape Cod and South Coast
- Frequency: 101.9 MHz
- Branding: Cool 102

Programming
- Format: Oldies

Ownership
- Owner: iHeartMedia, Inc.; (iHM Licenses, LLC)
- Sister stations: WCOD-FM, WEII, WXTK

History
- First air date: August 1970; 55 years ago
- Call sign meaning: Cape and Islands Broadcasting (original owners)

Technical information
- Licensing authority: FCC
- Facility ID: 2683
- Class: B1
- ERP: 12,000 watts horizontal polarization; 11,340 watts vertical
- HAAT: 145 meters (476 ft)
- Transmitter coordinates: 41.5587°N 70.5956°W

Links
- Public license information: Public file; LMS
- Webcast: Listen live (via iHeartRadio)
- Website: cool102.iheart.com

WCIB (101.9 FM "Cool 102") is a commercial radio station licensed to Falmouth, Massachusetts, and serving Cape Cod, Martha’s Vineyard and the South Coast area. It airs an oldies radio format and is owned by iHeartMedia, Inc. The studios and offices are on Barnstable Road in Hyannis.

WCIB has an effective radiated power (ERP) of 12,000 watts horizontal polarization and 11,340 watts vertical. The transmitter is on Spring Bars Road in Falmouth, near the local Walmart.

== History ==
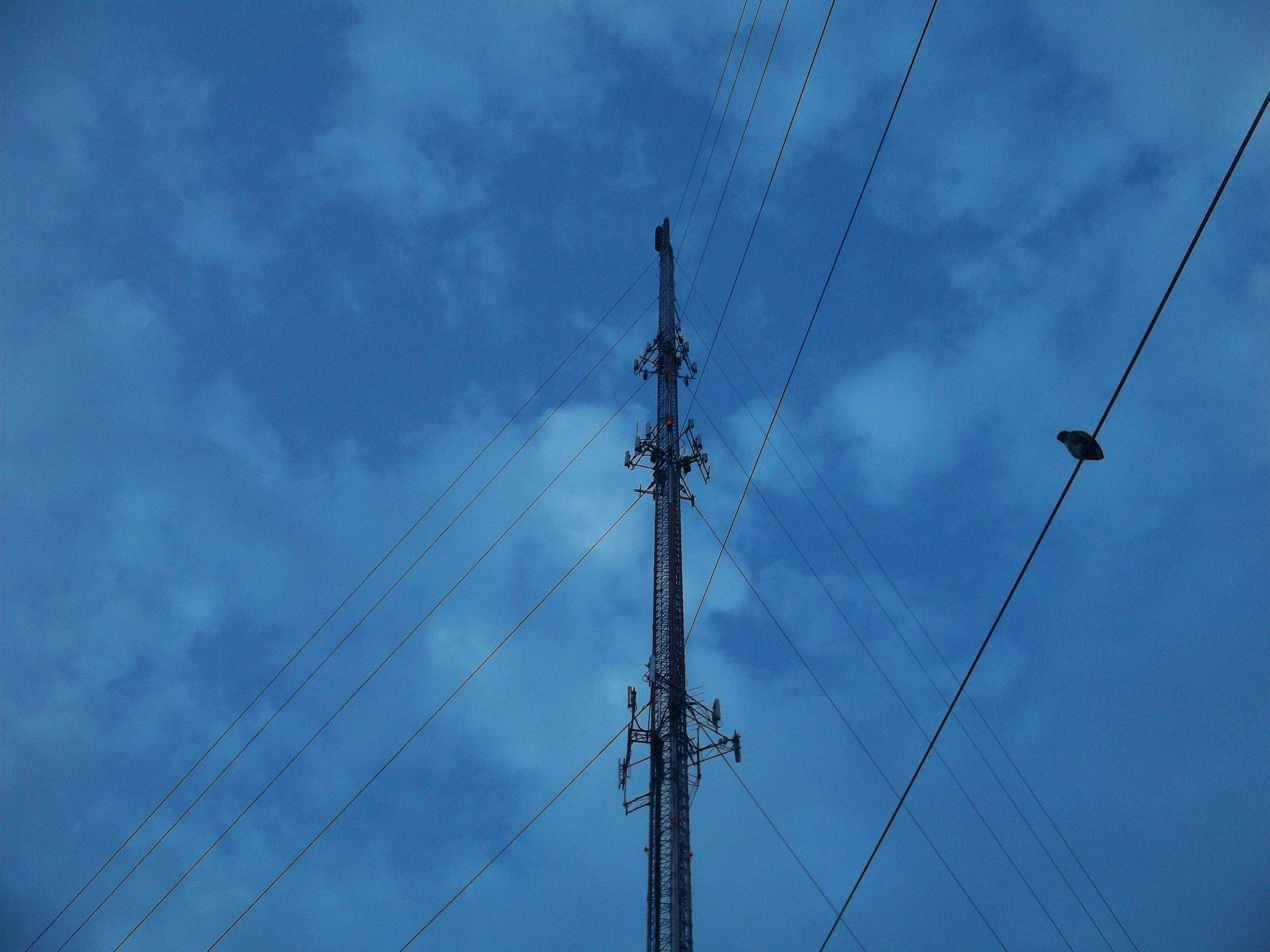
WCIB's transmission tower in Falmouth

=== Top 40, AC and Country ===
The WCIB call letters stand for Cape and Islands Broadcasting, the original company that signed the station on in August 1970 (not to be confused with WGBH-owned public radio station WCAI, which has the same call sign meaning).

For several years, WCIB programmed a top-40 format, but by late 1974 (after losing the top-40 battle to WCOD-FM) the station switched to an "Adult Gold" format. The station was later home to a soft adult contemporary format known as "Lite 102 WCIB", owned by Boston radio personality Larry Justice. After a short stint as "Country Thunder 101", the station was rebranded by its new owner, Al Makkay, as Cool 102, which quickly established itself as the market's ratings leader. Makkay Broadcasting sold WCIB, with its sister stations WRZE and WCOD-FM, to Qantum Communications in 2003 for $32M.

=== Clear Channel ownership ===
On May 15, 2014, Qantum Communications announced that it would sell its 29 stations, including WCIB, to Clear Channel Communications (now iHeartMedia), in a transaction connected to Clear Channel's sale of WALK AM-FM in Patchogue, New York to Connoisseur Media via Qantum. The transaction was consummated on September 9, 2014.

WCIB programs Christmas music during the holiday season. The station usually makes this change in the last week of November, but in 2017 did so on November 1. iHeartMedia Cape Cod market manager Allison Davis said that "Given the general malaise around the country, we decided this was the right time to launch a feel-good format." It later discontinued the flip to Christmas music, except for Christmas Eve and Day.

After performing the Christmas music stint again in December 2025, at Midnight on December 29 the station relaunched the "Cool 102" brand with their classic hits format now re-focused primarily on 1960s and 1970s music; the first song under the relaunched "Cool" was "My Girl" by The Temptations.

=== Signal reduction and coverage change ===
On August 6, 2014, Clear Channel filed a contingent application involving WCIB, WBWL and WWBB. It would eliminate the directional pattern of WBWL in nearby Boston, giving WBWL a better signal. The application called for the reduction of WCIB's signal from a full 50,000 watts down to 13,000 watts with a directional null away from Boston, which also reduced their signal in the Providence, Rhode Island market and the Outer Cape area.

The application was approved on October 6, 2014. WCIB's reduced power transmitter was put on the air December 9, 2014. In August 2015, WCIB’s power was reduced to 12,000 watts to become a Class B1 (25,000-watt equivalent) radio station.

Previous logo

=== Shift to Oldies ===
On December 26, 2025, WCIB shifted their format from classic hits to 60s-70s oldies, still under the "Cool 102" branding.
