= XHRI-FM =

Radio station in Reynosa, Tamaulipas, Mexico

- Reynosa, Tamaulipas; Mexico
- Broadcast area: Reynosa-McAllen Metropolitan Area
- Frequency: 102.9 MHz (HD Radio)
- Branding: 102.9 FM

Programming
- Format: Adult Contemporary

Ownership
- Owner: Grupo Radio Rey; (Radio Impulsora, S.A.)

History
- First air date: December 21, 1960
- Former call signs: XERI-AM (1960–2021)
- Former frequencies: 810 kHz (1960–2021)
- Call sign meaning: "Radio Impulsora"

Technical information
- Licensing authority: CRT
- Class: A
- ERP: 3,000 watts
- HAAT: 76 m (249 ft)
- Transmitter coordinates: 26°04′14.83″N 98°15′27.87″W

XHRI-FM is a radio station on 102.9 FM in Reynosa, Tamaulipas, Mexico, known as 102.9 FM.

== History ==
XERI-AM 810 received its concession on December 21, 1960. It was a 250-watt daytimer owned by José Francisco Leal Marroquín. Radio Impulsora, S.A., became the concessionaire in 1966. By the 1980s, XERI was broadcasting at night and had doubled its daytime power to 500 watts.

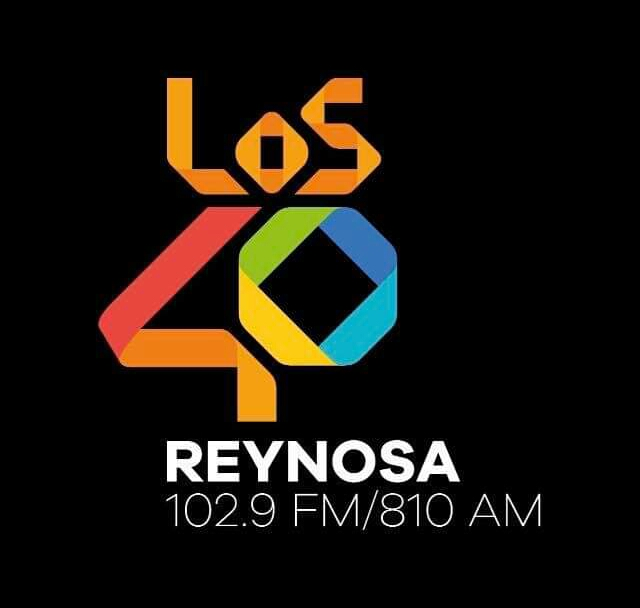
Former logo while simulcasting with 810

In June 2020, XERI began its AM-FM migration by signing on XHRI-FM 102.9. In October, the station announced its adoption of the Los 40 franchise pop format.

The AM station was turned off in July 2021 after the required year of simulcasting. It dropped the Los 40 format on February 1, 2023, but its operation became sporadic later that year. Correspondence with the Instituto Nacional Electoral (INE) revealed that its owner, Antonio Gallegos González, was suffering from a metastatic kidney tumor. Gallegos died in Texas on December 6, 2023.
