= XHNC-FM =

Radio station in Celaya, Guanajuato, Mexico

- Celaya, Guanajuato; Mexico
- Frequency: 102.9 MHz
- Branding: Fiesta Mexicana

Programming
- Format: Regional Mexican

Ownership
- Owner: Radiorama; (Radio Comunicación Trébol de Celaya, S.A. de C.V.)

History
- First air date: June 2, 1943 (concession)

Technical information
- ERP: 6 kW
- HAAT: 95.93 meters
- Transmitter coordinates: 20°31′10.5″N 100°49′29.96″W

Links
- Webcast: Listen live
- Website: bienydefiesta.com

XHNC-FM is a radio station on 102.9 FM in Celaya, Guanajuato, Mexico. XHNC is owned by Radiorama and carries a regional Mexican format known as Fiesta Mexicana.

== History ==
XHNC began as XENC-AM 1540. It received its concession in June 1943 and was originally owned by El Heraldo del Bajío, S. de R.L. In 1968, the concessionaire was changed to Radiodifusora Comercial XENC, S.A.

It migrated to FM in 2011 and changed concessionaires again in 2015.
