= Open House Party =

- The current Open House Party logo
- Genre: Top 40/CHR
- Running time: 5 hours
- Country of origin: United States
- Syndicates: United Stations Radio Networks (2012-present); RadioCraft (2010-2012); Westwood One (2009-2010); Superadio Networks (1988-2009)
- Hosted by: Saturday: Kannon (2017-present); John Garabedian (1987-2017); Sunday: Joe Breezy (2021-2023); Kannon (2007-2021, 2023-Present); Kane (2004-2007); John Garabedian (1987-2004)
- Created by: John Garabedian
- Original release: September 5, 1987
- Website: Open House Party

Open House Party (often referred to as "OHP") is an American radio show hosted by Kannon, branded as "The Biggest Party on the Planet!", playing contemporary hit music. From its inception in September 1987, OHP quickly became popular with its live all-request format, along with a heavy rotation of dance music and remixes that differentiated itself from most Top 40 stations or shows. John Garabedian created and hosted both Saturday and Sunday nights for nearly 30 years. The show's audience and revenue peaked from the mid 1990s to late 2000s, where it was heard on over 175 stations and became the world's most-listened-to radio program on weekend nights. Since Garabedian's departure, the show has changed drastically in terms of presentation and production with less than 30 total affiliates. A key reason for OHP's decline is that it is no longer live, but instead, voice-tracked.

The original logo for Open House Party, used from 1987 to some time in the early 90s.

The show airs on most affiliates from 7 p.m. to Midnight Eastern Time and 6 p.m. to 11 p.m. Central Time, while stations in the western half of the United States delay the broadcast by two hours. Some stations rebroadcast OHP from Midnight to 5 a.m. (in Eastern and Mountain Time) or 11 p.m. to 4 a.m. (in Central and Pacific Time).

== History ==
In 1955, the original Open House Party was created as the afternoon show on radio station WORC in Worcester, Massachusetts. Garabedian would often co-host the show and went on to become one of the key people to bring up ratings and create major success for the station. After the sale of Garabedian's television station V66 in 1986, he realized that being on the radio was his true passion. In March 1987, Garabedian went to a party in Boston where he bumped into the legendary Program Director of Kiss 108/WXKS-FM, Sunny Joe White, who asked Garabedian if he would do a weekend shift on the station. At dinner the following week, Garabedian proposed the idea for a big live, interactive, national party show. White loved it, and agreed to put it on Kiss 108. After looking into various office buildings, Garabedian decided to do the show from his basement. He and his friends strapped a 50-foot pole to his chimney to hold up a little microwave antenna aimed at the Prudential Tower, 24 miles (39 km) to the east, in downtown Boston.

On September 5, 1987, at 7 p.m., Open House Party hit the air for the very first time on Kiss 108. Within six months, it became the most-listened-to radio program in Boston on Saturday night, as well as the most listened to radio program every week in the Boston radio market with a 14.8 share.

By May 1988, stations across the country heard about Open House Party's success and were signing on. The 50-foot pole was taken down and replaced by a satellite dish. By 1990, over 100 stations were carrying Open House Party in the United States and another 40 in Canada. During a brief demise of the Top 40 format in 1992 and the rise of country and hip-hop in the mainstream, many stations were changing formats, which resulted in OHP losing over half of their affiliates and causing Garabedian's syndication network Superadio to nearly go bankrupt. For about 5 years, the Sunday night show became Street Jams, which was hosted by Paco Lopez and playing rhythmic music, until Garabedian decided to put Open House Party back on Sundays, hosted by himself.

This logo designed by Mike Ciolino, was used from 2002 to 2009.

Garabedian continued to host both Saturday and Sunday until March 2004, when WFLZ afternoon jock Kane took over the Sunday night show from his house in Tampa. Kane later moved to Washington, D.C., and became a syndicated host through iHeartMedia doing his morning show on WIHT, along with Sunday nights on Club Kane. In December 2007, then Wired 96.5/WRDW-FM Philadelphia afternoon jock Kannon, who had already been a mixer and production manager for Garabedian, became the new host of Sunday nights, and currently voice-tracks the show from his house in Atlanta. Kane died at the age of 43 on March 5, 2021.

On April 16, 2016, Garabedian announced live on the air that his memoir "The Harmony of Parts", would be released on October 3, 2016. The book details his whole life up until that point.

In May 2016, filming had begun for an Open House Party documentary titled "Super Radio FM: The Story of Open House Party". Darren Rockwell, a frequent visitor to the show in the late 90s and early 2000s, serves as the film's producer. Later on, the project was renamed "Be Your Dream: The Story of John Garabedian & the Open House Party".

On October 25, 2016, it was announced that John Garabedian would not return as the host of Open House Party in 2017. Having hosted the show since 1987, Garabedian sold it to United Stations in 2012 and wanted to do something new, stating, "When I sold 'Open House Party' to United Stations four years ago, they required me to host for four more years. That expires at midnight this New Year's Eve. Though they were surprised I declined to renew, I explained that I had one major life achievement I had yet to accomplish and needed space to do it." On December 17, 2016, Garabedian announced on air that United Stations had not found a new host for Saturday nights yet, and was asked if he would stick around until the end of January, to which he agreed. His final show aired on January 28, 2017.

On January 5, 2017, it was announced that Kannon would become the host of Saturday nights, in addition to Sundays which he had been hosting since 2007.

Kannon continued to host both Saturday and Sunday until November 2021, when Hot 106.7/WNFN-FM Nashville afternoon jock Joe Breezy took over the Sunday show. As of December 2023, that station has flipped to country music and Kannon is hosting Sunday again too. The largest market Open House Party currently airs in is Providence, Rhode Island on WPRO-FM for nearly 30 years. The show is pre-recorded and broadcast from United Stations Radio Networks headquarters in New York.

== Segments ==
This is an incomplete list of segments that have formerly aired on the show. Currently, OHP has no segments or contests.

- Make It or Break It (also called "Rate the Record"): Garabedian plays a new song each week and listeners call in with their votes and opinions. Open House Party fact: Only one song has ever "Made It" by 100%—that was "Friday I'm in Love" by The Cure and was announced on air by Open House Party's Jeff Docherty in 1992. On September 10, 2016, Garabedian briefly revived "Rate-Rate-Rate the Record" for the first time in many years by playing Lady Gaga's "Perfect Illusion", her first single in nearly three years.
- Who Sings It?: Always the 4th song of the show, Garabedian plays a "throwback" song and listeners call to guess the artist in order to win a prize. People who have won must wait another six months before winning again. This segment was only on Saturdays, and is no longer featured due to the inability to do contests on a pre-recorded show.
- Lewis Online: Featured on Garabedian's Sunday night show in the 90s. The show's software engineer Reed Lewis, would give listeners tips about computers and other technology which was vastly evolving at the time. The exact start and end date of this segment is unknown.
- Satellite Mega-Mix: Garabedian talks to club DJs, artists and live reporters from major events who then introduce a dance mega-mix of three songs. This segment only aired on Saturday nights from the early 90's until July 17, 2010. Garabedian said "the club and dance music scene was dying and finding people to do this bit with was a lot of work every week".
- Research Rich: Mediabase co-founder and former-president Rich Meyer gives a list of the week's top 5 songs (based on Mainstream CHR radio airplay) and then Garabedian plays Meyer's pick for the "Hot New Song of the Week". Kannon continued to do the segment for a short period after taking over as host, but is no longer featured. Formerly on Saturday nights only. Meyer now does a similar feature on Thursday during Garabedian's new weeknight Top 40 show, Party Liveline hosted by Mason Kelter.
- The Big 3: A countdown of the night's three most requested songs, followed by the DJ's choice for a final "sign-off" song. This segment was only featured on Saturdays. (Dropped in May 2020)
- The Purple Chamber of Gold: Originally created in the 90's as a segment where Garabedian played phone calls from listeners who had a special story to tell about the night's featured song. It was dropped in the early 2000s, but then revived in 2010 to replace the Satellite Mega-Mix. During the last hour of the show, approximately 40 minutes of "throwbacks", or songs older than a year, were played. (Dropped in May 2020)
- Long Distance Nighty Nights: This segment was always immediately after the Purple Chamber ends on Sundays. Over an instrumental version of a song, the DJ plays phone calls from listeners saying a special "Nighty Night" to their loved one. Many songs have been used for this segment since 1988, the first one being "Two Occasions" by The Deele, along with "Just the Way You Are" by Bruno Mars, "Heaven (Candelight Mix)" by DJ Sammy, "That's When I'll Stop Loving You" by NSYNC and "Thinking Out Loud" by Ed Sheeran. After the Nighty Night calls play, the DJ says his final goodnight, and the song plays. (Dropped in May 2020)
- Shout-Outs: The DJ plays a collage of shoutouts from listener phone calls, similar to the Long Distance Nighty Nights, but featured an hour earlier. This segment was immediately after the second stopset of Hour 4 on Sunday nights only. (Dropped in May 2020)
- Rant Room: The DJ plays a collage of phone calls from listeners "ranting" about something that's upsetting them, whether it be a person, place, thing etc. Originally called "Bitch Box" until radio stations began to complain about the name. This segment was immediately after the second stopset of Hour 2 on Sunday nights only. (Dropped in May 2020)
- Digital Dave: Similar to "Research Rich" and airing in the old time slot, Kannon talks to Dave van Dyke, the President and CEO of Bridge Ratings to count down the Top 5 most-streamed Pop hits. Like other features on the current incarnation of Open House Party, it did not last long and only aired for a couple of months on Saturday nights.
