= XHITG-FM =

Radio station in Tuxtla Gutiérrez, Chiapas, Mexico

- Tuxtla Gutiérrez, Chiapas; Mexico
- Frequency: 89.1 FM
- Branding: Somos Radio

Programming
- Format: Cultural

Ownership
- Owner: Radio Núcleo; (Impulsora Pro Cultura y Salud del Estado de Chiapas, A.C.)
- Sister stations: XHSCC-FM San Cristóbal de las Casas

History
- First air date: December 19, 2012 (permit)
- Call sign meaning: Impulsora Tuxtla Gutiérrez

Technical information
- ERP: 3 kW
- HAAT: -206.3 m
- Transmitter coordinates: 16°45′23.3″N 93°08′42.1″W

XHITG-FM is a noncommercial radio station broadcasting on 89.1 FM in Tuxtla Gutiérrez, Chiapas, Mexico.

== History ==
XHSCC-FM was permitted on December 19, 2012, more than twelve years after it was applied for on October 13, 2000.
