= XHCRG-FM =

Radio station in Ciudad Camargo, Chihuahua

- Ciudad Camargo, Chihuahua; Mexico
- Broadcast area: Ciudad Camargo, Chihuahua
- Frequency: 102.9 FM
- Branding: Super FM

Programming
- Format: Grupera

Ownership
- Owner: Radiza; (Radio Televisora Integral, S.A. de C.V.)

History
- First air date: January 5, 1998

Technical information
- Licensing authority: CRT
- Class: B
- ERP: 5 kW
- HAAT: 1,840 m (6,040 ft)

Links
- Webcast: radiza.com.mx/radios%20nuevas/radio4.php
- Website: radiza.com.mx

XHCRG-FM is a radio station on 102.9 FM in Ciudad Camargo, Chihuahua. The station is owned by Radiza and known as Super FM 102.9.

== History ==
XHCRG received its concession on March 14, 1997, and signed on January 5, 1998. The concession was originally awarded to Carlos de Jesús Aguirre Gómez, part of the Aguirre Gómez family that owns Grupo Radio Centro and Grupo Radio México.
