= WFRQ =

Radio station in Harwich Port, Massachusetts, United States

- Harwich Port, Massachusetts; United States
- Broadcast area: Hyannis, Massachusetts; Cape Cod
- Frequency: 93.5 MHz
- Branding: 93.5 / 94.7 Frank FM

Programming
- Format: Adult hits

Ownership
- Owner: Steve Chessare; (Coxswain Media LLC)
- Sister stations: WHYA, WKFY, WPXC

History
- First air date: May 18, 1989; 37 years ago (as WFXR)
- Former call signs: WFXR (1989–1995); WUNX (1995–1996); WJCO (1996–1998); WYST (1998–2001); WDVT (2001–2006); WFQR (2006–2012); WHYA (8/2012–9/2012)
- Call sign meaning: "Frank"

Technical information
- Licensing authority: FCC
- Facility ID: 29570
- Class: A
- ERP: 6,000 watts
- HAAT: 77.4 meters (254 ft)
- Transmitter coordinates: 41°41′30.4″N 70°8′48.1″W
- Translator: See § Translator
- Repeater: 102.9 WPXC-HD2 (Hyannis)

Links
- Public license information: Public file; LMS
- Webcast: Listen live
- Website: www.frankfmcapecod.com

WFRQ (93.5 FM) — branded as 93.5/94.7 Frank FM — is a radio station licensed to Harwich Port, Massachusetts. It serves the Cape Cod market with an adult hits format. The station is also heard on 102.9 WPXC-HD2 (Hyannis) via HD Radio and on 94.7 W234DP (Hyannis), a translator of WPXC-HD2. Unlike other Frank FM stations launched in the mid-2000s, this Frank FM station was patterned after Jack FM. It currently plays a broad selection of music from the 1960s to present.

== 93.5 and 101.1 frequency history ==
=== 1987-1993 ===
WFAL (101.1) went on the air on February 12, 1987, under the ownership of Schooner Broadcasting, with principals Linda Baines and Brenda Westgate. WFXR (93.5) went on the air on May 18, 1989, with a satellite delivered soft rock format. In the fall of 1991, the owners of WFXR purchased WFAL. This deal was inked two days after a historic rule change by the Federal Communications Commission. The new rules allowed one entity to own two FM stations in the same market. This deal was the second in the nation to win FCC approval.

In the fall of 1991, WFXR and WFAL began simulcasting. The stations were then known as "Fox Radio 93-5 and 101 FM" with a soft rock format focused heavily on 1980s music. In 1993, the stations were sold to Omni Broadcasting (then owners of WCOD-FM). After stunting for a week with Steve Miller Band's "Fly Like An Eagle", the format changed to country as "Cape Country 93-5 and 101 FM". With the exception of its local morning show featuring Keith Lemire and Joe Rossetti, programming was provided by Jones Radio Networks' "U.S. Country", (what is now "Mainstream Country" by Westwood One) a live 24-hour satellite-delivered music format from Denver, Colorado.

=== 1994-1997 ===
Omni was soon sold to Paul Levesque. With the failure of country music to attract an audience, another format change was made. WFXR became WUNX, while WFAL became WUNZ. Both stations continued their simulcast as an affiliate of the "Underground Network", a network of alternative rock stations that included WIBF ("WDRE Philly") in Philadelphia and WDRE on Long Island. The stations were then known as "UN 93.5 and 101.1" with the slogan "Cape Cod's Rock Alternative".

WUNX and WUNZ were sold to Ernie Boch's Boch Broadcasting in 1995, and the stations quickly took different paths. WUNX became WJCO, and adopted a satellite-delivered adult contemporary music format as "Coast 93.5", while WUNX became WWKJ, and adopted a satellite-delivered classic rock format as "KJ-101".

=== 1998-2002 ===
In 1998, WJCO stunted for a week with Chumbawamba's hit "Tubthumping". WJCO then became WYST, relaunching as hot adult contemporary-formatted "Star 93-5" with the slogan "Continuous Hit Music". The format was again satellite-delivered by Jones Radio Networks "Adult Hit Radio" (what is now "Hot AC" by Westwood One). The station's voiceover talent was Mark Driscoll and two jingles were added from the 1989 JAM Creative Productions "Breakthrough" package. Star 93-5's morning show was provided by WPLJ New York's "Scott & Todd in the Morning". Scott & Todd's syndication attempt didn't last long, as it ended in October 1998. In 1999, after a period of a music-intensive morning show, the morning show was replaced locally with the satellite-delivered Charlotte-based "Bob & Sheri" show, and the station's slogan changed to "Today's Best Music".

In the spring of 1999, WYST dropped the satellite provided format and morning show. The station became automated locally with no DJs and a very narrow playlist of current artists from the CHR format. The hits lasted until late 1999, when the station again changed to a satellite-delivered oldies format as "Oldies 93.5".

In 2001, Boch brought in a new staff to run the Cape Cod stations. The new staff immediately changed the formats of WYST and WWKJ. WYST became WDVT and was known "93-5 The Vault", playing classic rock. WWKJ became WTWV and was known as "101.1 The Wave" with the slogan "The '80s and More". Before long, "The Vault" was closed and WDVT reverted to a simulcast of "The Wave". In 2002, WTWV began to add more current hits into the mix and it began to sound more like an adult hits station.

=== 2003-2010 ===
In 2003, Boch changed the formats of WDVT and WTWV to oldies as "93-5 & 101.1 The Wave". The station featured local personalities with a fun and upbeat delivery. A limited number of jingles were also added. The station featured Bumper Morgan as one of their personalities, who was also the voice of then sister station WCOD. The talent line-up consisted of Greg Cassidy, Super Max Cooper, Johnny Thunder and Wild Bill Hayes.

In 2005, Boch Broadcasting was acquired by Qantum Communications. Qantum was required to sell off three of the combined company's stations. "The Wave" low-rated simulcast stations of WDVT and WTWV along with WPXC were sold to Nassau Broadcasting Partners.

On March 22, 2006, Nassau replaced the oldies format of "The Wave" with "Frank FM". Unlike Nassau's other classic hits stations in Portland, Maine and southern New Hampshire with the same name, WDVT and WTWV flipped to the adult hits format as "101.1 and 93.5 Frank FM" with the slogan "We Play It All". The voiceover talent selected for station imaging was voice actor/comedian George Lowe. On March 28, 2006, WDVT and WTWV became WFQR and WFRQ, respectively. The station launched a new website at the domain frankplaysitall.com.

Frank FM had been jockless since its launch. In the absence of on-air personalities, Frank FM offered several features to its listeners. Weekday mornings from 6 am until 9 am was the "More Music Morning Show", promoting the fact that it is all music with no DJ chatter. The "Commercial Free Workday" followed from 9 am until noon with no commercials for at least 180 minutes. As an added bonus, Frank FM never repeated the same song twice between 9 am and 5 pm on weekdays.

Weekends on Frank FM featured unique themes beginning on Friday at 5 pm until Sunday at 11:59pm. Each weekend would be a different theme including the No Repeat Weekend (never hear the same song twice), Class Reunion Weekend (a different year featured every hour from 1970 through last year), Double Play Weekend (two songs in a row by the same artist), Number Ones Weekend (all #1 hits), Runner Up Weekend (all #2 hits), One Hit Wonder Weekend (an artist known mainly for only a single success), Frank Goes to the Movies Weekend (all songs from movie soundtracks), All American Weekend (all songs by American artists), Back to the '80s Weekend (all 1980s songs) and the Nothing But the '90s Weekend (all 1990s songs).

=== 2011-2013 ===
In September 2011, Goldman Sachs Lending Partners, Fortress Credit Opportunities and Private Equity Capital, LLC launched an involuntary bankruptcy filing against Frank FM's parent company, Nassau Broadcasting Partners, LP. In October, Nassau's involuntary Chapter 7 petition was converted to a voluntary Chapter 11 after it convinced lenders and the bankruptcy court that halting operations at its radio stations would ultimately hurt creditors.

On May 4, 2012, Nassau's properties were liquidated in a bankruptcy auction. WFRQ and WFQR plus sister station WPXC were all sold to highest bidder John H. Garabedian. This returned Garabedian to broadcasting on the Cape, as he placed 96.3 WGTF (what is now WEII) on the air in the 1970s. John named the newly formed company CodComm, Inc. On July 17, 2012, an FCC construction permit was granted to move the 101.1 transmission facility from Mashpee to Barnstable at the tower of sister station WPXC.

On August 17, 2012, changes began to take place under the guidance of new CodComm Station Manager and vice-president, Steve "McVie" Solomon. The call sign on 93.5 was changed from WFQR to WHYA and after finishing the "Back to the '80s Weekend", themed weekends were discontinued. On September 5, 2012, the call signs of 93.5 and 101.1 were then swapped. 93.5 was changed from WHYA to WFRQ and 101.1 was changed from WFRQ to WHYA.

On September 13, 2012, on-air programming on 101.1 was switched to CodComm's newly renovated broadcast studio at 243 South Street in Hyannis, followed by 93.5 a few days later. The format was tweaked and the station's image was updated as "93.5 and 101-1 Frank FM", with a new primary slogan of "Cape Cod's Ultimate Variety". Songs from the 1960s through 1980s began to see less airplay, with a greater focus on songs from the 1990s through today. The station's voiceover talent was replaced with James Justice and jingles were added from the TM Studios "AMP'D" package. On September 26, 2012, an FCC construction permit was granted to move the 93.5 transmission facility from Brewster to Dennis.

On March 11, 2013, on-air sweepers and jingles were changed to "93.5 Frank FM", dropping any mention of 101.1. On March 18, 2013, CodComm applied for license to cover with the FCC to complete its 93.5 transmission facility move from Brewster to Dennis. Changes at the new site include going from a non-directional to a directional pattern to protect adjacent station WSNE-FM, but raising power from 3 kW to 6 kW. On April 1, 2013, at 5:00 p.m., 101.1 WHYA broke away from its simulcast with 93.5 and began stunting with an automated countdown to 11:00 a.m. on April 4. Over the next few months, slight tweaks in the music rotation once again brought back a greater emphasis on songs from the 1980s.

== 93.5 frequency history ==
=== 2014 ===
In February 2014, on-air personalities were added to the station for the first time since becoming Frank in 2006. Jenn Kennedy moved from weekends on sister station WPXC to mornings, followed by voiceover and production guru Bumper Morgan in middays, and 20-year Cape Cod radio veteran Janet Birchfield in afternoons. For Sunday through Friday evenings, the syndicated "Intelligence For Your Life with John Tesh" moved from competitor WQRC to the station. The branding was updated to "Frank 93-5", with a new primary slogan of "The Music Of A Whole Generation" and "Cape Cod's Variety" as a secondary. New jingles from TM Studios with the updated image were also added into rotation, along with a new website domain of frank935.com.

On April 28, 2014, sister station WPXC added in-band on-channel (IBOC) HD Radio, with WFRQ simulcasting on WPXC-HD2 and sister station WKFY simulcasting on WPXC-HD3. On May 22, 2014, translator 93.9 W230AW (Centerville) owned by Jeff Shapiro's Nantucket Public Radio changed the parent station that it rebroadcasts from WRYP to WPXC (HD2). The transmission facility for W230AW was located in Barnstable at that time. An FCC construction permit was previously granted in March 2014 to move it to Mashpee. W230AW made that move on September 19, 2014, and began operating with 250 watts ERP at 160.3 feet above ground level. Coverage of Frank to the Upper Cape (including the communities of Bourne, Falmouth, Sandwich and Mashpee) and western sections of Barnstable was restored via 93.9's new coverage contour. These areas were previously served via 101.1 prior to its break away from the 93.5 simulcast in April 2013. In the summer of 2014, "Saturday Night at the '80s" was added from 7 p.m. to midnight. It is hosted by Sweet Pete, who also does afternoons on WXXX in Burlington, Vermont and CodComm sister station WHYA.

On August 8, 2014, CodComm made a tweak to Frank's format. Songs from 2000 through the present were completely removed from rotation and songs from the 1960s through the 1990s were featured. Most of the pre-1980 songs added back into rotation have not been played on Frank since the September 2012 format tweak. Songs from the 1980s were mainly unaffected by the adjustment, some only reclassified from adult hits to classic hits. This put Frank musically in line with other classic hits stations such as WCBS-FM and KRTH. In October 2014, personalities began promoting the new 93.9 frequency on-air. Although the station continues to be branded "Frank 93-5", the tagline "and now at 93.9 for the Upper Cape" was added. Voiceover talent James Justice was also phased out and replaced by John Tesh. John began to voice both station promos and dry liners that play over song intros at times when no on-air personality is on the air. By year's end, Janet Birchfield and Bumper Morgan had parted ways with CodComm.

=== 2015 ===
On January 20, 2015, Frank launched a brand new morning show. Stephanie Viva, formerly one half of "Dan and Stephanie" on WCOD-FM, teamed up with CodComm Station Manager and Vice President Steve McVie to create "The New Frank Morning Show with Stephanie and Steve". Steve's former afternoon drive shift on sister station WHYA was replaced with Sweet Pete, who was formerly on Frank's afternoon drive. Jenn Kennedy moved from mornings to mid-days and Steve McVie began to double as Frank's afternoon host.

On February 6, 2015, just shy of six months after the segue to classic hits, CodComm decided to revert Frank to a modified version of its Adult Hits format in an effort to boost ratings. Most pre-1980 songs were removed from rotation, while songs from the 1990s, 2000s and 2010s were added back in. The musical revamp this time around is more female friendly, while playing less rock leaning songs. The former secondary slogan "Cape Cod's Variety" was reintroduced, including the brief reuse of a top of hour jingle that sang this, which was last used prior to August 2014.

At the beginning of March 2015, the translator 107.9 W300BE (Vineyard Haven) owned by Jeff Shapiro's Nantucket Public Radio changed the parent station that it rebroadcasts from WNAN to WPXC (HD2). An FCC construction permit that was previously granted in January 2013 to switch W300BE to a directional antenna pattern and to increase the power to 250 watts was subsequently modified. In March, the revised permit included a move of the transmitter to the mainland, just across the bay in Falmouth, which was completed by the summer. The move effectively gave 107.9 better coverage in Falmouth in addition to the Vineyard, complementing the 93.9 translator in Mashpee which covers the rest of the Upper Cape.

On November 23, 2015, Stephanie Viva returned to WCOD-FM, reuniting with longtime host Dan Mahoney to relaunch the "Dan and Stephanie Morning Show". A few weeks prior to this, Steve McVie was left solo in morning drive, with the urgent task to find new talent in order to rebuild the morning show. Just after Thanksgiving Day, Frank FM temporarily flipped to an all Christmas music format for the holidays, followed by the hiring of a new husband and wife team. In December 2015, Davin and Ana Fesmire joined the morning show alongside Steve McVie. On December 26, 2015, the station returned to its adult hits format.

=== 2016 ===
In August 2016, the decision was made to modify the format, morning show and afternoon drive positions in an effort to increase ratings. After being heard for the last time during the first week of August, Davin and Ana were removed from the morning show. In the week of August 14, 2016, Frank FM slowly transitioned back to classic hits. The slogan was changed to "Cape Cod's Greatest Hits" and all current hits were removed from rotation. A large number of songs from the 1980s and 1990s were added back in that were not heard at least since February 2015, including select 1970s' hits. Rob Walker moved to afternoon drive from sister station WKFY, replacing Steve McVie, who was also formerly heard in that time slot.

=== 2021-present ===
Effective November 30, 2021, CodComm sold WFRQ, sister stations WHYA, WKFY and WPXC, and three translators to Steve Chessare's Coxswain Communications for $3.2 million.

On Labor Day, September 4, 2023, the station debuted a broader playlist. This effectively moved Frank back to an adult hits format. The new positioner became "Frank Plays It All", retiring "Cape Cod's Greatest Hits" after seven years. Program Director Steve McVie was quoted by RadioInsight: "'Frank plays it all' means exactly that. We're mixing music from every kind of genre, from every decade. It's like having a playlist with a thousand of your favorite songs all in one spot. We're ditching the old playbook and playing hits from the 1960s all the way up to today. That means you'll hear everything from rock and country to R&B, hip hop and pop. You'll hear all those songs that bring back fond memories."

Veteran programmer/personality Rob Walker moved out of afternoon drive to become the station's imaging voice, while Billy Teed moved up from nights to afternoons. Weekends feature longtime New England personality Ralphie Marino with the new "Saturday Night Dance Party", as well as the syndicated "Retro Pop Reunion" with Joe Cortese on Sunday nights. The original domain name used from the station's launch in 2006 until 2013 of "frankplaysitall.com" was re-registered and currently redirects to "frankfmcapecod.com".

== Translator ==
Broadcast translator for WPXC-HD2
Call sign	Frequency	City of license	FID	ERP (W)	Transmitter coordinates	FCC info
W234DP	94.7 FM	Hyannis, Massachusetts	140929	160	41°33′32.4″N 70°35′43.1″W	LMS
