= XHRPU-FM =

Radio station in Durango, Durango, Mexico

- Durango, Durango; Mexico
- Frequency: 102.9 FM
- Branding: La Lupe

Programming
- Format: Variety hits

Ownership
- Owner: Multimedios Radio; (Radio Triunfos, S.A. de C.V.)

History
- First air date: 1974
- Former call signs: XERPU-AM (1974–2020)
- Former frequencies: 1370 kHz (1974–2020)

Technical information
- Licensing authority: CRT
- Class: A
- ERP: 2,850 watts (FM)
- HAAT: 59.6 m (196 ft)

Links
- Webcast: Listen live
- Website: mmradio.com

XHRPU-FM is a radio station on 102.9 FM in Durango, Durango, Mexico. It is owned by Multimedios Radio and carries its La Lupe variety hits format.

== History ==
Logo as La Z used until 2019

XERPU-AM 1370 received its concession in November 1974. It added an FM combo station in 1994.

In 2015, several subsidiaries of Grupo Radio México, this station included, were merged into Grupo Radio Centro, which is owned by the same family.

On October 18, 2019, operation of XHRPU-FM, GRC's only station in the city of Durango, was transferred to Multimedios Radio, which flipped the station to its La Lupe variety hits format. It is Multimedios's first radio station in the area. On January 8, 2020, the station presented the Federal Telecommunications Institute with the surrender of its 1,000-watt AM facility, remaining on FM only.
