= KCUT-LP =

- Moab, Utah; United States
- Broadcast area: Metro Moab
- Frequency: 102.9 MHz
- Branding: Moab Rocks Community Radio

Programming
- Format: Rock

Ownership
- Owner: Tunnel Vision Music

History
- First air date: April 10, 2014

Technical information
- Licensing authority: FCC
- Facility ID: 197158
- Class: L1
- ERP: 100 watts
- HAAT: −141.2 meters (−463 ft)
- Transmitter coordinates: 38°34′31.60″N 109°33′1.40″W

Links
- Public license information: LMS
- Webcast: Listen live
- Website: moabrocksradio.com

KCUT-LP, also known as Moab Rocks Community Radio, is a Rock formatted low-power FM broadcast radio station licensed to and serving Moab, Utah. KCUT-LP is owned and operated by Tunnel Vision Music. It is community supported.

Because the station is low powered, it is limited to the immediate Moab region.
