= WRZO-LP =

- Chambersburg, Pennsylvania; United States
- Frequency: 102.9 MHz
- Branding: 102.9 The Razor

Programming
- Format: Album-oriented rock

Ownership
- Owner: Dack Inc.

Technical information
- Licensing authority: FCC
- Facility ID: 135294
- Class: L1
- ERP: 100 watts
- HAAT: −37.9 meters (−124 ft)
- Transmitter coordinates: 39°56′53.00″N 77°38′49.00″W

Links
- Public license information: LMS
- Website: WRZO-LP Online

WRZO-LP (102.9 FM, "102.9 the Razor") is a radio station broadcasting an album-oriented rock music format. Licensed to Chambersburg, Pennsylvania, United States, the station is currently owned by Dack Inc.
