= WMUU-LP =

Radio station in Madison, Wisconsin

- Madison, Wisconsin; United States
- Frequency: 102.9 MHz

Programming
- Format: Community Radio/Public Radio
- Affiliations: Pacifica Radio

Ownership
- Owner: Cow Power Media Productions Co.

Technical information
- Licensing authority: FCC
- Facility ID: 197230
- Class: L1
- ERP: 99 watts
- HAAT: 29 meters
- Transmitter coordinates: 43°04′30.00″N 89°23′14.00″W

Links
- Public license information: LMS
- Website: http://wmuu.airtime.pro/

WMUU-LP (102.9 FM) is a radio station. Licensed to Madison, Wisconsin, United States, the station serves the Madison, Wisconsin area. WMUU broadcasts a public radio format with news programming from several international broadcasters, the Pacifica Public Radio network and locally based community oriented programing.

On August 6, 2019, an application was filed with the Federal Communications Commission to transfer the WMUU license to Cow-Power Media Productions Co.; the station will continue in perpetuity to broadcast First Unitarian Society of Madison services. The assignment of the license was consummated on December 9, 2021.
