= WEII =

WEEI sports radio affiliate in Dennis, Massachusetts, U.S.

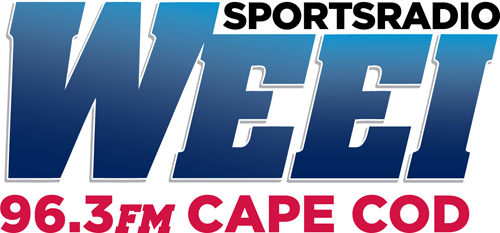
- Dennis, Massachusetts; United States
- Broadcast area: Hyannis, Massachusetts; Cape Cod
- Frequency: 96.3 MHz
- Branding: SportsRadio 96.3 WEEI Cape Cod

Programming
- Format: Sports
- Affiliations: WEEI Sports Radio Network; ESPN Radio; Boston Celtics Radio Network; Boston Red Sox Radio Network; Cape Cod Baseball League

Ownership
- Owner: iHeartMedia; (iHM Licenses, LLC)
- Sister stations: WCIB; WCOD-FM; WXTK

History
- First air date: June 15, 1981
- Former call signs: WGTF (1981–1984); WXJY (1984–1988); WNTX (1988–1993); WRZE (1993–2009)
- Former frequencies: 93.5 MHz (1981–1982)
- Call sign meaning: similar to WEEI

Technical information
- Licensing authority: FCC
- Facility ID: 54037
- Class: B1
- ERP: 25,000 watts
- HAAT: 90.5 meters (297 ft)
- Transmitter coordinates: 41.729°N 70.167°W

Links
- Public license information: Public file; LMS
- Website: WEII site within WEEI-FM website

WEII (96.3 FM, "SportsRadio 96.3") is a radio station in Dennis, Massachusetts. The station airs a sports radio format from Boston-based WEEI-FM. It is owned by iHeartMedia.

== History ==
The station started life in 1981 under the call letters WGTF, operating on 93.5 FM. It moved to 96.3 in 1982 (the 93.5 frequency is now occupied by WFRQ) and changed its call letters to WXJY in 1984 and WNTX in 1988. The station's format as WNTX was "Oldies 96", competing with the larger "Oldies 103" in Boston. The Makkay family, headed by Al Makkay, purchased the frequency in late 1992, and in January 1993, it flipped to a Top 40 (CHR) format as WRZE "96.3 The Rose"."Dino, WRZE-FM Nantucket/Hyannis, MA September 1995 (Restored Unscoped)". In 2003, Makkay Broadcasting sold WRZE, along with its sister stations WPXC and WCIB, to Qantum Communications for $32 million. In 2008, the station, which was originally licensed to Nantucket, was re-licensed to Dennis.

On March 25, 2009 (though the changeover was originally announced for April 1), WRZE flipped formats, becoming a simulcast of popular Boston sports radio station WEEI.

On May 15, 2014, Qantum Communications announced that it would sell its 29 stations, including WEII, to Clear Channel Communications (now iHeartMedia), in a transaction connected to Clear Channel's sale of WALK AM-FM in Patchogue, New York, to Connoisseur Media via Qantum. The transaction was consummated on September 9, 2014.

On November 28, 2023, iHeartMedia disclosed in a job posting that it would not renew WEII's contract to carry WEEI programming, with the costs to carry the WEEI network and Boston Red Sox baseball being diverted to hiring a locally-based sports talk host.
