= WGTX (AM) =

Simulcasts WGTX-FM, Truro
- West Yarmouth, Massachusetts; United States
- Broadcast area: Cape Cod
- Frequency: 1240 kHz
- Branding: Cape Cod's X

Programming
- Language: English
- Format: Classic hits

Ownership
- Owner: Gary Hanna; (GCJH, Inc.)
- Sister stations: WGTX-FM

History
- First air date: October 2, 1940; (station itself); May 6, 1944; (current license)
- Former call signs: WOCB (1944–1978); WSOX (1978); WOCB (1978–1991); WUOK (1991–1997); WBUR (1997–2014); WBAS (2014–2024)
- Former frequencies: 1210 kHz (1940–1941)

Technical information
- Licensing authority: FCC
- Facility ID: 6251
- Class: C
- Power: 1,000 watts
- Transmitter coordinates: 41°38′7.4″N 70°14′4.07″W
- Translator: 106.5 W293DW (West Yarmouth)

Links
- Public license information: Public file; LMS
- Webcast: Listen live
- Website: www.capecodsx.com

WGTX (1240 kHz) is an AM radio station licensed to West Yarmouth, Massachusetts, and serving Cape Cod. It is owned by GCJH, Inc. and broadcasts a classic hits format as a simulcast of WGTX-FM (102.3) in Truro.

WGTX transmits at a power of 1,000 watts non-directional. The station's transmitter is on Radio Lane in West Yarmouth, programming is also heard on 250-watt FM translator W293DW at 106.5 MHz.

== History ==
WOCB first signed on the air on October 2, 1940; the station was originally owned by the Cape Cod Broadcasting Company. It was the first radio station on Cape Cod since WJBX, which operated for several months in 1926.

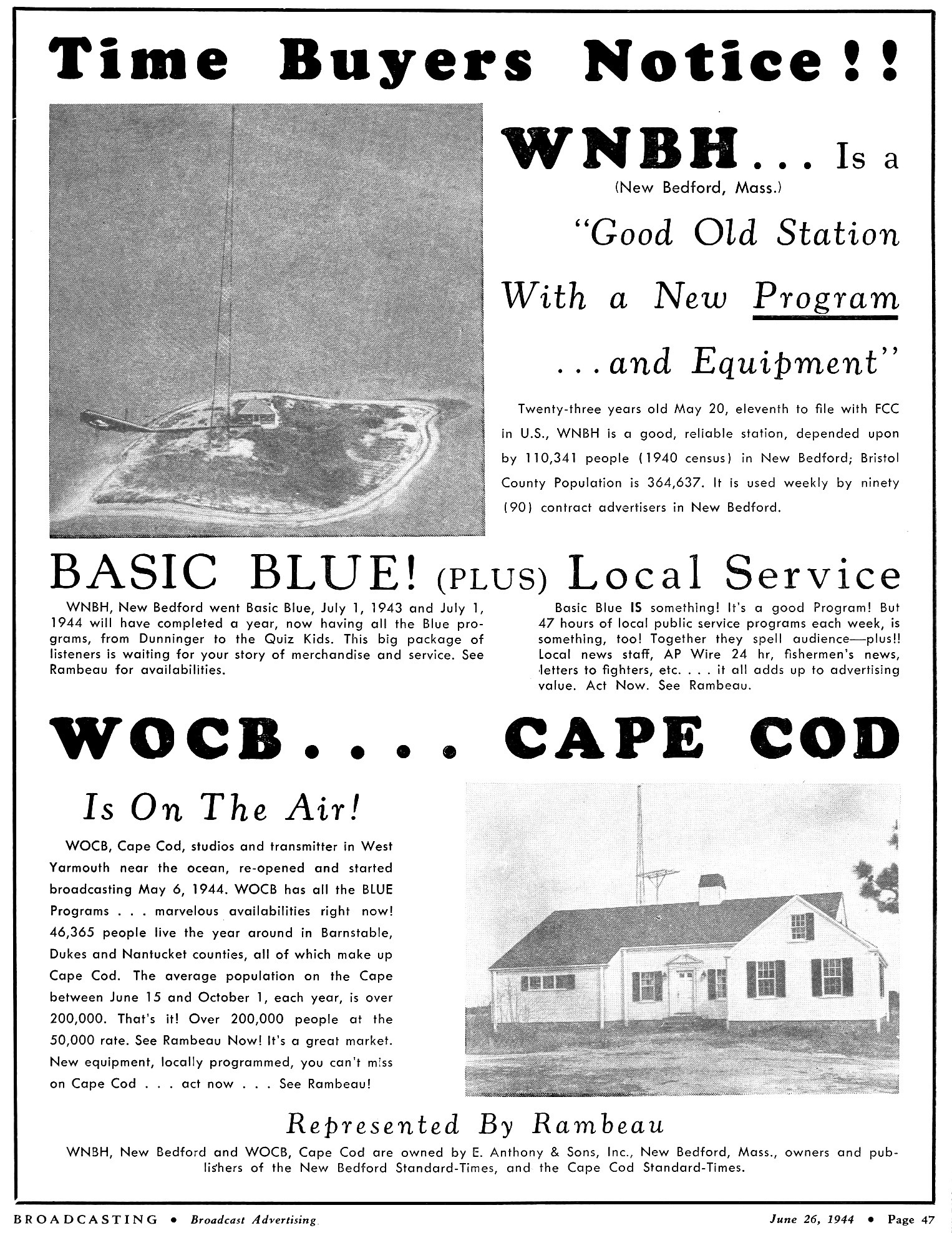
1944 advertisement for recently restarted WOCB and co-owned WNBH in New Bedford, Massachusetts.

WOCB originally operated at 1210 kHz, but moved to 1240 in 1941 as a result of the North American Regional Broadcasting Agreement. WOCB shut down in May 1943 after running out of money, resulting in its license being canceled by the Federal Communications Commission (FCC) on November 30. E. Anthony and Sons, owner of WNBH in New Bedford and publisher of the New Bedford Standard-Times and the Cape Cod Standard-Times, bought the station's equipment and relaunched WOCB under a new license on May 6, 1944, as a network affiliate of the Blue Network, broadcasting mostly network programming (soap operas, radio drama, newscasts, etc.) with some local programming, remaining affiliated with that network after it became ABC. When ABC Radio broke into four sub-networks in 1968, WOCB affiliated with ABC's American Entertainment Network.

Its FM signal, for years a simulcast of its AM signal, signed on May 2, 1948, on 94.3 MHz, and in 1962, moved to 94.9 MHz. (The 94.3 frequency is now used on Cape Cod by WZAI, the Brewster repeater for WCAI.) By the 1970s, WOCB-FM broke away from simulcasting the AM during midday and evening hours to broadcast easy-listening music while still simulcasting the AM's format (then adult contemporary, with a heavy news commitment) during weekday drive times and hourly newscasts the rest of the broadcast day. From July 31 to August 16, 1978, the station was assigned the call sign WSOX; while the WOCB call sign was promptly restored to the AM station, its FM sister station would remain WSOX-FM until 1984. In the summer through winter of 1981, the afternoon drive announcer on WOCB was Edd Hall, who subsequently did voice work for Late Night with David Letterman from 1982 to 1990 and was the announcer on The Tonight Show with Jay Leno from 1992 to 2004.

In 1991, Hurricane Bob blew down WOCB's transmitter tower, and the damage suffered was so severe that the owners could not afford to rebuild. The station was then sold to Ernie Boch, Sr., an automobile dealer in the Boston suburb of Norwood, Massachusetts, who turned WOCB-FM into the flagship station for his new Boch Broadcasting company, WXTK. Concurrently, WOCB became WUOK, and under that call sign programmed CNN Headline News, sports radio, and finally a WXTK simulcast. By 1997, Boch Broadcasting, which by this point owned four FM radio stations, no longer needed WUOK and donated it to Boston University (BU) for use as a relay of WBUR-FM in Boston, under the call sign WBUR; the simulcast began March 3, 1997.

Logo as Rebe ABR

Boston University's 2013 acquisition of WBUA (92.7 FM) in Tisbury (on Martha's Vineyard) to serve as a WBUR-FM satellite rendered the 1240 AM facility redundant; on August 5, 2013, BU announced that it would be sold to Alex Langer, with plans to program it with Portuguese-language programming similar to that of another Langer station, WSRO. The call sign was changed to WBAS on February 1, 2014, two days after BU and Langer agreed to a time brokerage agreement. The WBUR-FM simulcast was concurrently replaced with jazz music, which Langer had been temporarily programming on WZBR in Dedham before its conversion into a simulcast of WSRO; by mid-February, WBAS was itself a WSRO simulcast, creating a three-station network. In December 2014, WBAS and WZBR began carrying some separate programming from WSRO; by 2015, the three stations were jointly branded as "Rede ABR".

Langer Broadcasting took WBAS and its translator silent in mid-July 2020, due to financial difficulties; WSRO and WZBR (the latter of which had left "Rede ABR" to carry a brokered R&B format a few years earlier) also concurrently suspended operations. As of February 2021, WBAS returned to the air broadcasting an adult standards format. Effective April 29, 2021, Bob Bittner Broadcasting bought the station from Langer Broadcasting for $100,000. The station operated as part of a three-station network originating from WJTO in Bath, Maine, which also included WJIB in Cambridge.

In February 2024, Bob Bittner Broadcasting agreed to sell WBAS to Gary Hanna's GCJH Inc, owner of WGTX-FM in Truro, for $130,000; under a local marketing agreement, WBAS began simulcasting WGTX on February 14, with the "Memories Station" programming moving to WGTX's third HD Radio channel under a $1-a-year lease. The sale followed the 2023 death of Bob Bittner. The call sign was changed to WGTX on February 21, 2024.

== Translator ==
Broadcast translator for WGTX
Call sign	Frequency	City of license	FID	ERP (W)	HAAT	Class	Transmitter coordinates	FCC info
W293DW	106.5 FM	West Yarmouth, Massachusetts	142210	250	0 m (0 ft)	D	41°38′7″N 70°14′7″W	LMS

In February 2020, W268CP changed its frequency to 106.5 for WKFY in East Harwich to change its frequency to 101.5 and move its transmitter to Orleans. In February 2024, W268CP's call sign was corrected to W293DW to reflect the correct FM channel for 106.5.
