= WVJP (AM) =

Caguas, Puerto Rico; Puerto Rico
- Frequency: 1110 kHz
- Branding: Radio Caguas / Dimension 103

Programming
- Format: Talk/Personality

Ownership
- Owner: Borinquen Broadcasting Company; (Borinquen Broadcasting Co., Inc.)
- Sister stations: WVJP-FM; WDIN

History
- First air date: November 24, 1947
- Call sign meaning: Virella Jiménez Pereira

Technical information
- Licensing authority: FCC
- Facility ID: 6442
- Class: B
- Power: 2,500 watts day 500 watts night
- Transmitter coordinates: 18°13′25″N 66°01′11″W

Links
- Public license information: Public file; LMS

WVJP (1110 kHz, Radio Caguas) is an AM radio station licensed to serve Caguas, Puerto Rico. The station is owned by Borinquen Broadcasting Company. It airs a Talk/Personality format, and also simulcasts the Dimensión 103 network.

The station was assigned the WVJP call letters by the Federal Communications Commission in 1947.
