= KNDA =

Radio station in Alice, Texas

Coordinates: 27.708°N 97.782°W

- Alice, Texas; United States
- Broadcast area: Corpus Christi, Texas
- Frequency: 102.9 MHz
- Branding: 102.9 Da Bomb

Programming
- Format: Urban contemporary

Ownership
- Owner: Guerra Communications

History
- First air date: 1995
- Call sign meaning: "Da Bomb"

Technical information
- Licensing authority: FCC
- Facility ID: 11080
- Class: C2
- ERP: 50,000 watts
- HAAT: 150 meters (490 ft)

Links
- Public license information: Public file; LMS
- Website: 1029dabomb.com

KNDA (102.9 FM "102.9 Da Bomb") is an urban contemporary radio station serving the Corpus Christi, Texas, area. KNDA broadcasts with an ERP of 50,000 watts, is licensed to serve the community of Alice, Texas, and is owned by Guerra Communications. Its studios are in Corpus Christi and its transmitter is southwest of Robstown, Texas.
