= WWMR =

- Saltillo, Mississippi; United States
- Broadcast area: Tupelo, Mississippi
- Frequency: 102.9 MHz
- Branding: Outlaw 102.9

Programming
- Format: Country

Ownership
- Owner: Mike Brandt; (Southern Broadcasting LLC)

History
- First air date: August 27, 2008

Technical information
- Licensing authority: FCC
- Facility ID: 166007
- Class: C3
- ERP: 12,500 watts
- HAAT: 142 meters (466 ft)
- Transmitter coordinates: 34.409°N 88.540°W

Links
- Public license information: Public file; LMS

WWMR (102.9 FM) is a radio station licensed to Saltillo, Mississippi and serving the Tupelo, Mississippi area. The station is owned by Mike Brandt, through licensee Southern Broadcasting LLC.

== History ==
The station was granted the WWMR calls on September 5, 2006. On August 27, 2008, WWMR signed on the air with a talk format as part of the Supertalk Mississippi talk radio network. On September 3, 2016, WWMR changed its format from talk to country, branded as "Outlaw 102.9". On December 25, 2017, WWMR changed its format from country to Top 40/CHR, branded as "Wild 102.9". On May 1, 2018, WWMR changed their format to Southern Gospel and branding themselves as 102.9 The Eagle.

On November 25, 2022, WWMR began stunting with Christmas music, branded as "Christmas 102.9", and a new format was expected to launch after the holiday season.
