= KQIB =

- Idabel, Oklahoma; United States
- Frequency: 102.9 MHz
- Branding: Q102.9

Programming
- Format: Classic hits

Ownership
- Owner: Jay and Laura Lindly; (JL Radio LLC)
- Sister stations: KKBI

History
- First air date: August 1, 1999

Technical information
- Licensing authority: FCC
- Facility ID: 89460
- Class: A
- ERP: 6,000 watts
- HAAT: 97.0 meters (318.2 ft)
- Transmitter coordinates: 33°59′57″N 94°47′29″W

Links
- Public license information: Public file; LMS
- Website: KQIB Online

KQIB (102.9 FM) is a radio station broadcasting a classic hits music format. KQIB is licensed to Idabel, Oklahoma, United States. The station is currently owned by Jay and Laura Lindly, through licensee JL Radio LLC.

== History ==
KQIB's former logo (until around 2023)

KQIB started life on August 1, 1999 as "Q102.9" with a hot adult contemporary format. In 2023, the station flipped to a classic hits music format, and shorten its name to "Q102".
