= WXCH =

Coordinates: 39°11′10″N 85°57′29″W

- Columbus, Indiana; United States
- Frequency: 102.9 MHz
- Branding: Mojo 102.9

Programming
- Format: Classic hits

Ownership
- Owner: Reising Radio Partners Inc.

History
- First air date: 1990 (as WOVR-FM)
- Former call signs: WRIP (1990); WOVR-FM (1990–1992)

Technical information
- Licensing authority: FCC
- Facility ID: 16255
- Class: A
- ERP: 5,100 watts
- HAAT: 97 meters (318 ft)

Links
- Public license information: Public file; LMS
- Webcast: Listen Live
- Website: mojo1029.com

WXCH (102.9 FM) is a radio station licensed to Columbus, Indiana, United States. The station airs a Classic hits format and is currently owned by Reising Radio Partners Inc.
