= WPBK =

Radio station in Crab Orchard, Kentucky

- Crab Orchard, Kentucky; United States
- Broadcast area: Lincoln County, Kentucky
- Frequency: 102.9 MHz

Programming
- Format: Variety

Ownership
- Owner: Radioactive, LLC
- Operator: Lincoln-Garrard Broadcasting Company Inc.

History
- Call sign meaning: "People's Bank of Kentucky"

Technical information
- Licensing authority: FCC
- Facility ID: 164242
- Class: A
- ERP: 2,750 watts
- HAAT: 110.0 meters
- Transmitter coordinates: 37°25′39″N 84°39′21″W

Links
- Public license information: Public file; LMS
- Webcast: wpbkfm.com/live.asp
- Website: wpbkfm.com

WPBK (102.9 FM) is a local radio station serving Lincoln County, Kentucky. The city of license is Crab Orchard, Kentucky, and offices and studios are located in the Arch "Buzz" Walker building in downtown Stanford, Kentucky. The transmitter is centrally located in the Highland community of Lincoln County.

WPBK is licensed to Radioactive, LLC, but was brought to air and is operated by Lincoln-Garrard Broadcasting Company Inc. under a local marketing agreement with a purchase option. The option was exercised in 2009 and an application for transfer of license to Lincoln-Garrard Broadcasting was granted by the FCC on February 25, 2010. Final closing of the sale is expected to occur later in 2010.

WPBK's final amended construction permit was granted November 27, 2007. An application for a license to cover was submitted on January 7, 2008, and was granted on October 20, 2008. The call sign WPBK stands for "People's Bank of Kentucky" stemming from a unique naming rights sponsorship arrangement with a local bank.

All programing is locally originated and oriented to residents of Lincoln County and the surrounding communities. Programming mainstays are the "Jammin' with Jayme" morning show, an eclectic mix running from DJ banner to in-studio interviews with local personalities and newsmakers; "General Store", a call-in want-to-buy or sell bulletin board show; "The Higher Road Home" weekday late afternoons; and extensive coverage of local school and youth recreational league sports.

Chicago attorney Jonathan L. Smith, the sole owner of Lincoln-Garrard Broadcasting Company Inc. is a Lincoln County native with a family history in radio. Smith's father Calvin Smith purchased Lincoln-Garrard Broadcasting in 1969. Lincoln-Garrard Broadcasting operated radio station WRSL in Stanford from sign-on in 1961 until 2006 when the license was moved to Corbin, Kentucky. WPBK station manager/ "General Store" host Renee Knies and sales manager/ morning show host Jayme Phillips are both former WRSL employees and the "General Store" is a reincarnation of the long running WRSL "General Store" program.

WPBK broadcasts are streamed live over the internet with most sports broadcasts and many in-studio interviews also made available as streaming archives. The station regularly hears from both expatriate Lincoln Countians and traveling Lincoln County residents listening from all over the globe.

== General references ==
- Lincoln-Garrard Broadcasting Company "News Release to Local Media (9/25/07)", Radio-info.com, Retrieved March 5, 2010
