= WPCG-LP =

- Canton, Georgia; United States
- Broadcast area: Cherokee County, Georgia (NNW of Atlanta)
- Frequency: 102.9 MHz
- Branding: Grace 102.9

Programming
- Format: Christian radio

Ownership
- Owner: Cherokee FM Radio

History
- First air date: 2004
- Former frequencies: 107.9 MHz (2005–2013); 103.7 MHz (2013–2014); 102.7 MHz (2014–2015)
- Call sign meaning: We Proclaim Christ's Grace

Technical information
- Licensing authority: FCC
- Facility ID: 124395
- Class: L1
- ERP: 15 watts

Links
- Public license information: LMS
- Website: https://mygraceradio.com/

WPCG-LP (102.9 FM) is an LPFM Christian radio station licensed to Canton, Georgia, an exurb of metro Atlanta. The station is owned by Cherokee FM Radio.

The station's original application was for Woodstock, Georgia, later receiving a construction permit in 2004 for a new facility on 107.9. It city of license was changed to Canton, Georgia, also in Cherokee County. In 2008 WPCG applied to change its frequency to 103.7. The FCC granted permission via special temporary authority, and WPCG began operation at a new tower site on 103.7 on December 30, 2008. On May 14, 2013, the WPCG received permission from the FCC to operate permanently on 103.7. The site is next to Waleska Road on Reinhardt College Parkway, about 2 1/2 miles or 4 km north of downtown Canton, and has a much greater height, but at a much lower power than its previous site but much closer to Canton, its city of license.

WPCG-LP change frequencies again on August 5, 2014, to 102.7 FM and moved to 2288 Marietta Highway, Suite 170, Canton, GA 3014. On January 5, 2016, WPCG moved to Holly Springs, GA, next to I-575, increasing its predicted coverage from under 50,000 people to about 250,000 in Cherokee and North Cobb counties based on engineering studies.

In June 2009, the transfer of control of the station from original licensee Cherokee Presbyterian Church to Cherokee FM Radio.

WBHF AM 1450 in nearby Cartersville, Georgia previously had broadcast callsign WPCG.
