= KPIM-LP =

- Broken Arrow, Oklahoma; United States
- Broadcast area: Tulsa, Oklahoma
- Frequency: 102.9 MHz
- Branding: St. Michael Catholic Radio 102.9

Programming
- Format: Catholic Religious

Ownership
- Owner: Broken Arrow Catholic Radio, Inc.

History
- First air date: 2015

Technical information
- Licensing authority: FCC
- Facility ID: 197632
- Class: LP1
- ERP: 50 watts
- HAAT: 42.1 meters (138 ft)
- Transmitter coordinates: 36°02′8″N 95°52′59″W
- Translator: (94.9 MHz) K235BK (Tulsa)

Links
- Public license information: LMS
- Webcast: https://stmichaelradio.com/stream/
- Website: http://www.stmichaelradio.com

KPIM-LP (102.9 FM) is a low-power FM radio station licensed to Broken Arrow, Oklahoma, United States. The station is currently owned by Broken Arrow Catholic Radio, Inc.

== History ==
The station call sign KPIM-LP on February 14, 2014.

== Translators ==
Call sign	Frequency	City of license	FID	ERP (W)	HAAT	Class	FCC info
K235BK	(94.9 MHz) FM	Tulsa, Oklahoma	142082	250	80 m (262 ft)	D	LMS
