= WDIN =

Radio station in Camuy, Puerto Rico

Camuy, Puerto Rico; U.S.
- Broadcast area: Puerto Rico area
- Frequency: 102.9 MHz
- Branding: Dimension 103

Programming
- Language: Spanish
- Format: Spanish variety format

Ownership
- Owner: Isabel Ruiz Rodriguez; (Northcoast Broadcasters, Inc.)
- Sister stations: WVJP, WVJP-FM

History
- First air date: October 2, 1968 (56 years ago)
- Former call signs: WCHQ-FM (1968–1997)
- Call sign meaning: DimensIóN 103

Technical information
- Licensing authority: FCC
- Facility ID: 27954
- Class: B
- ERP: 50,000 watts
- HAAT: 856.0 meters (2,808.4 ft)
- Transmitter coordinates: 18°17′27″N 66°39′53.9″W
- Translator(s): WDIN-FM1, WDIN-FM2, WDIN-FM3

Links
- Public license information: Public file; LMS
- Website: dimension103fm.com

WDIN (102.9 FM), branded on-air as Dimension 103, is a radio station broadcasting a Spanish variety format. It is licensed to Camuy, Puerto Rico, and it serves the Puerto Rico area.

The station is owned by Isabel Ruiz Rodriguez, through licensee Northcoast Broadcasters, Inc.

The station is relayed through booster stations, WDIN-FM1 in Caguas, WDIN-FM2 in Mayaguez and WDIN-FM3 in Yauco, both operating at 102.9 FM.

== History ==
The station went on the air as WCHQ-FM on October 2, 1968. It is remembered for its "HQ-103" moniker. On October 10, 1997, the station changed its call sign to the current WDIN.
