= WNBH =

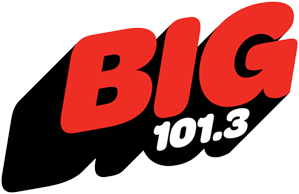
- New Bedford, Massachusetts; United States
- Broadcast area: South Coast
- Frequency: 1340 kHz
- Branding: Big 101.3

Programming
- Format: Variety hits

Ownership
- Owner: John Fuller (Cat Country 98.1, Inc.)
- Sister stations: WCTK

History
- First air date: November 2, 1925
- Call sign meaning: New Bedford Hotel (former studio location); backronymed to "New Bedford's Big Hits"

Technical information
- Licensing authority: FCC
- Facility ID: 25866
- Class: C
- Power: 1,000 watts (daytime), 960 watts (night)
- Transmitter coordinates: 41°38′29.37″N 70°57′32.14″W
- Translator: 101.3 W267CY (New Bedford)
- Repeater: 98.1 WCTK-HD2 (New Bedford)

Links
- Public license information: Public file; LMS
- Webcast: Listen live
- Website: www.big1013.com

WNBH (1340 AM) is a radio station in New Bedford, Massachusetts, owned by John Fuller (doing business as Cat Country 98.1, Inc.) and broadcasting a variety hits format. The station's branding refers to its FM translator station, W267CY. The station is also carried on the second HD Radio sub-channel of sister station WCTK.

Federal Communications Commission (FCC) records list WNBH's first license date as January 9, 1924. However, the station has generally traced its founding to May 1921, when one of WNBH's original owners, Irving Vermilya, began making broadcasts over an amateur radio station.

== Programming ==
The longest-running program on WNBH is The Happy Bible Hour, presented by "People's Christian Church" of New Bedford. It began in the fall of 1927 with the Rev. Russell W. Baldwin. Pastor Baldwin hosted the program until his death in 1978. The Rev. Ellsworth B. McAfee continued the program until his death in 2008. Since that time, Pastor Ardyth Bednarz has hosted the program, which has also been broadcast on New Bedford station WBSM (1420 AM). It is also believed to be one of the longest-running religious radio programs in the United States.

WNBH broadcasts local high school football and boys basketball games for New Bedford High School, Greater New Bedford Regional Vocational-Technical High School, Fairhaven High School, Dartmouth High School, Bishop Stang High School and Old Rochester Regional High School. The station also broadcasts girls basketball state tournament games for these schools. Ed Perreira and Mark Enwright announce the games. Perreira also hosts the public affairs program Up Front on Sunday mornings.

Broadcast translator for WNBH
Call sign	Frequency	City of license	FID	ERP (W)	Class	Transmitter coordinates	FCC info
W267CY	101.3 FM	New Bedford, Massachusetts	202740	250	D	41°37′20.4″N 70°55′7.1″W	LMS

== History ==
=== Origin ===
WNBH's founder was Irving Vermilya, a Marconi company employee who called himself "Amateur Number One" and was one of the earliest and best known amateur radio operators. Following World War One, he was issued a standard amateur radio license for a station located at his home at 24 Allen Street in Marion, Massachusetts, with the call sign 1HAA. In the spring of 1921, Vermilya's station was upgraded to a Special Amateur license, with the new call sign of 1ZE.

In May 1922 the Slocum & Kilburn company of New Bedford, where Vermilya managed the radio department, was issued a license for a new broadcasting station with the sequentially assigned call letters WDAU. The station's transmitter was constructed by Vermilya and Fred Stock. WDAU eventually went silent and was deleted on November 18, 1924.

WNBH publicity has commonly traced the station's history to broadcasts conducted by Vermilya beginning in May 1921, and Vermilya's 1964 obituary stated that, based on this date, WNBH was "the third radio station in New England and the 11th in the United States". However, contemporary Department of Commerce records treated Vermilya's amateur stations, and Slocum & Kilburn's WDAU, as separate stations that were not directly tied to WNBH's history.

=== WBBG ===
In January 1924 Vermilya was issued his own broadcasting station license, with the sequentially assigned callsign WBBG, located at his home at 24 Vermilya Street in Mattapoisett, Massachusetts, transmitting on 1250 kHz. In the spring of 1924 the station moved to 1210 kHz. The new station's slogan was "The Voice from Cape Cod". WBBG was deleted in the fall of 1925, as Vermilya made plans to move his broadcasting activities to New Bedford.

=== WNBH ===
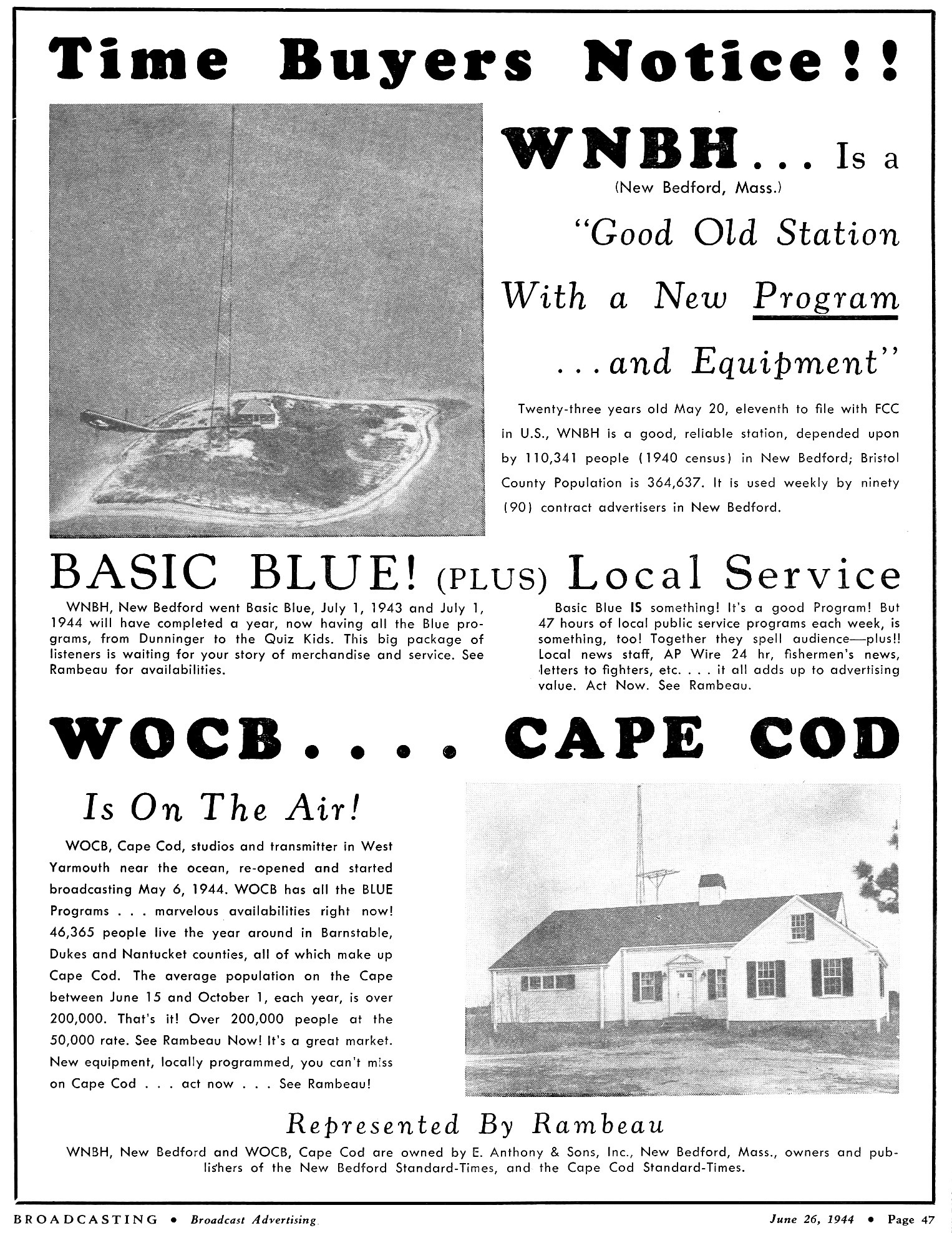
1944 advertisement for WNBH and co-owned and recently restarted WOCB in Cape Cod, Massachusetts.

In October 1925 Vermilya, along with A. J. Lopez, was issued a license for station WNBH in New Bedford, operating on 1210 kHz. Initially the Department of Commerce reported WNBH as a new station, however, based on the fact that WBBG and WNBH had a common owner in Vermilya, and both transmitted on 1210 kHz, the department ultimately concluded that WBBG and WNBH were functionally the same station, and a contemporary report stated that "This month brings a change of call to WBBG, Mattapoisett. This station will hereafter be known by the letters WNBH."

WNBH's studios were located at the New Bedford Hotel, whence it derived its call letters. An early transmitting antenna for the station was lifted onto the chimney of Atlas Tack Company in Fairhaven by helium-filled balloons. When the rig was in the right spot, the balloons were deflated by shotgun blasts. The operation took place at 5 a.m., and the gunshots prompted a neighbor to call the police.

Before March 1932, WNBH had joined the Yankee Network. On June 18, 1932, the Federal Radio Commission authorized the station to increase its daytime power from 100 to 250 watts; output remained at 100 watts at night. In March 1941, under the provisions of the North American Regional Broadcasting Agreement, WNBH was assigned to transmit on 1340 kHz, which has been its assignment ever since. In 1948 WNBH added FM service with WFMR (now WCTK) on 98.1 MHz, which had signed on two years earlier. These two stations are still co-owned. In 1997, WCTK moved its studios from New Bedford to Providence, Rhode Island to concentrate on fully serving the Providence Arbitron metro. In 2014, the station's tower was moved from the South Terminal area to behind St. Mary’s Cemetery and near Route 140 in New Bedford.

Promotional ad for WNBH as ESPN 1340 New Bedford, used from 2009 to 2019.

Some of the most recent formats broadcast by WNBH include talk, classic country, urban oldies, middle of the road from the former Unforgettable Favorites satellite service, adult standards from the former Timeless satellite service, and sports from ESPN Radio. After 10 years as a full-time ESPN Radio affiliate, WNBH switched to a classic hits format on February 1, 2019. Also at that time, sister station WPVD 1450 in West Warwick, Rhode Island, which had simulcasted WNBH programming since Hall acquired the station in 2001, switched to a simulcast of WCTK's "Cat Country 98.1" programming. WNBH officially debuted its new format on February 11, 2019, with the launch of FM translator station W267CY. The station took on the branding of "Big 101.3," referring to the frequency of the translator.

In July 2026, WNBH and sister station WCTK were sold to John Fuller.

== Notable alumni ==
- Gil Santos: DJ, play-by-play announcer for high school sports (1950s); play-by-play announcer for New England Patriots radio broadcasts (1966–2013) (deceased)
- Mike Gorman: play-by-play announcer for high school sports (1960s); sports director at WPRI-TV (1970s); play-by-play announcer for Boston Celtics broadcasts on NBC Sports Boston (1982–present)
- Russ Baldwin: news and sports director (1977–1993) (deceased)
