= That's When I'll Stop Loving You =

2000 song by NSYNC

Song by NSYNC

from the album No Strings Attached
- Released: March 21, 2000
- Recorded: March 1999
- Genre: Pop
- Length: 4:51
- Label: Jive
- Songwriter: Diane Warren
- Producer: Guy Roche

"That's When I'll Stop Loving You" is a song by NSYNC from their 2000 album No Strings Attached, written by Diane Warren and produced by Guy Roche.

== Production ==
Diane Warren wrote the track “That’s When I’ll Stop Loving You”, having previously penned “Music of My Heart" (1999) for the film of the same name, which was a collaboration between NSYNC and Gloria Estefan. Warren was in the studio for both recording sessions.

The group recorded the song around one microphone, recording vocals and harmonies live, aiming to emulate the 60's

The song was the first recorded for the album, being completed by March 1999.

== Critical reception ==
Entertainment Weekly felt it was a rare occasion when NSYNC slipped into Backstreet Boys' ballad territory. The Baltimore Sun compared it to the work of Boyz II Men. Stereogum felt that on the track was outshined by another ballad on the album, I Thought She Knew. The Daily Cougar felt it was the only ballad on the album that wasn't weak. VH1 thought the song's moral was "Everyone — guy or girl — wants a superhero every now and then."
