= WLKS-FM =

- West Liberty, Kentucky; United States
- Frequency: 102.9 MHz
- Branding: Kick 102.9 the Big One

Programming
- Format: Country music

Ownership
- Owner: Morgan County Industries, Inc.

Technical information
- Licensing authority: FCC
- Facility ID: 43776
- Class: A
- ERP: 6,000 watts
- HAAT: 100.0 meters
- Transmitter coordinates: 38°2′16″N 83°20′18″W

Links
- Public license information: Public file; LMS

WLKS-FM (102.9 FM) is a radio station broadcasting a country music format. Licensed to West Liberty, Kentucky, United States. The station is currently owned by Morgan County Industries, Inc.
