= WGTX-FM =

- Truro, Massachusetts; United States
- Broadcast area: Hyannis, Massachusetts; Cape Cod
- Frequency: 102.3 MHz (HD Radio)
- Branding: Cape Cod's X

Programming
- Format: Classic hits
- Subchannels: HD2: The Whale (classic rock); HD3: Bob's Memories Station (adult standards, oldies)

Ownership
- Owner: Gary Hanna; (Salt Air Broadcasting, Inc.)

History
- First air date: August 1999
- Former call signs: WTUR (1988–1993); WCDJ (1993–2007); WGTX (2007–2024)

Technical information
- Licensing authority: FCC
- Facility ID: 68214
- Class: A
- ERP: 2,150 watts
- HAAT: 81 meters (266 ft)
- Transmitter coordinates: 42.0223°N 70.0739°W
- Translators: 106.5 W293DW (West Barnstable, via WGTX (AM))
- Repeater: 1240 WGTX (AM) (West Yarmouth)

Links
- Public license information: Public file; LMS
- Webcast: Listen Live
- Website: www.capecodsx.com; www.bobsmemorystation.com (HD3)

WGTX-FM (102.3 FM, "Cape Cod's X") is a radio station licensed to Truro, Massachusetts. The station is owned by Gary Hanna, through licensee Salt Air Broadcasting Inc. Its programming is also simulcast on WGTX (1240 AM and 106.5 FM) in West Yarmouth.

== History ==
Shortly after the station was licensed (as WTUR in 1988 and later WCDJ in 1993), the original owners, Truro Wireless, Inc., ran into opposition from the Truro local government, who objected to a radio tower being built within the town limits. Until such a tower was built, the station could not air a regular broadcast schedule. In lieu of a tower, WCDJ would occasionally broadcast just long enough, via a small transmitter, at 340 watts, to keep their FCC license intact. The first of these limited broadcasts occurred in August 1999.

In August 2006, Truro Wireless (controlled by Karl Nurse) agreed to sell the WCDJ license to Thomas Troland's Dunes 102FM, LLC, in a $550,000 deal. The FCC granted the license transfer on March 29, 2007. The new owners got the call sign changed to WGTX, and began full broadcast service as "Dunes 102: Cape Cod's Oldies Radio" on August 5, 2007. Troland sold his 51-percent stake in the station to Ron Robin and Edmund Teo, who were already minority partners, for $450,000 in 2010. In 2012, WGTX rebranded as "Cape Cod's 102.3, The Dunes", in light of the format-wide re-branding of oldies stations.

Gary Hanna's Salt Air Broadcasting Inc. acquired WGTX for $180,000 effective April 7, 2021; upon taking control on March 30, the station began stunting with a playlist of diverse songs. In early April, WGTX relaunched as "X102.3"; the launch had been planned for April 1, but was delayed to that weekend by technical problems. Concurrently, the station began broadcasting in HD Radio, with additional subchannels featuring classic rock ("The Whale") and acoustic music ("Acoustic Cafe").

On February 14, 2024, the station began to simulcast on WBAS (1240 AM and 106.5 FM) under a local marketing agreement ahead of a $130,000 purchase of that station from Bob Bittner Broadcasting; the deal also saw WBAS' previous "Memories Station" programming move to WGTX's HD3 channel under a $1-a-year lease. The call sign for 102.3 was modified to WGTX-FM on February 15.
