= WVJP-FM =

Radio station in Caguas, Puerto Rico

Caguas, Puerto Rico; Puerto Rico
- Broadcast area: Puerto Rico
- Frequency: 103.3 MHz
- Branding: Dimension 103

Programming
- Format: Spanish Variety

Ownership
- Owner: Borinquen Broadcasting Company; (Borinquen Broadcasting Co., Inc.)
- Sister stations: WVJP, WDIN

History
- First air date: October 1968 (57 years ago)
- Call sign meaning: Virella Jimenez Pereira

Technical information
- Licensing authority: FCC
- Facility ID: 6441
- Class: B
- ERP: 31,000 watts
- HAAT: 898.0 meters (2,946.2 ft)
- Transmitter coordinates: 18°16′41″N 65°51′58″W

Links
- Public license information: Public file; LMS
- Website: dimension103fm.com

WVJP-FM (103.3 MHz), branded on-air as Dimension 103, is a radio station broadcasting a Spanish Variety format. The music genres included in the station's programming are "merengue", "salsa", "bachata", "reggaeton", "English-pop", "pop-rock" and "balada-pop".

WVJP is the primary station of Dimension 103, a network that includes WVJP-AM 1110 and WDIN/102.9 FM, covering the western and northern area of Puerto Rico.

Licensed to Caguas, Puerto Rico, United States, it serves the Puerto Rico area. The station is currently owned by Borinquen Broadcasting Co., Inc.
