= KAJN-FM =

- Crowley, Louisiana; United States
- Broadcast area: Lafayette, Louisiana/Lake Charles, Louisiana
- Frequency: 102.9 MHz
- Branding: 102.9FM KAJN

Programming
- Format: Contemporary Christian

Ownership
- Owner: Agape Broadcasters, Inc.
- Sister stations: KAJN-CD

History
- First air date: October 1, 1977
- Call sign meaning: The word "Cajun"

Technical information
- Licensing authority: FCC
- Facility ID: 56098
- Class: C
- ERP: 95,000 watts
- HAAT: 457 meters (1,499 ft)
- Transmitter coordinates: 30°2′19.0″N 92°22′15.0″W

Links
- Public license information: Public file; LMS
- Webcast: Listen live
- Website: kajn.com

KAJN-FM is a Contemporary Christian formatted broadcast radio station licensed to Crowley, Louisiana, serving South-Central Louisiana. KAJN-FM is owned and operated by Agape Broadcasters, Inc.

On August 31, 2018, a small airplane crashed into the station's transmitter tower, collapsing it, knocking the station off the air temporarily, and killing two on board the plane.
