= WQBH-LP =

- St. Joseph, Michigan; United States
- Frequency: 102.9 MHz
- Branding: WQBH Radio

Programming
- Format: Christian radio

Ownership
- Owner: Marriage and Family Commitment, Inc.

History
- First air date: June 27, 2015

Technical information
- Licensing authority: FCC
- Facility ID: 195764
- Class: LP1
- ERP: 61 watts
- HAAT: 38 metres (125 ft)
- Transmitter coordinates: 42°05′34.1″N 86°27′28.0″W

Links
- Public license information: LMS
- Website: www.wqbhradio.com

WQBH-LP (102.9 FM, "WQBH Radio") is a radio station licensed to serve the community of St. Joseph, Michigan. The station is owned Marriage and Family Commitment, Inc., and airs a Christian radio format.

The station was assigned the WQBH-LP call letters by the Federal Communications Commission on March 14, 2014.
