= XHTNO-FM =

Radio station in Tulancingo, Hidalgo

Tulancingo, Hidalgo, Mexico; Mexico
- Broadcast area: Hidalgo
- Frequency: 102.9 FM
- Branding: Ultra 102.9 FM

Ownership
- Owner: Grupo Ultra; (Ultradigital Tulancingo, S.A. de C.V.)

History
- First air date: July 22, 1992 (concession)
- Former frequencies: 96.3 MHz
- Call sign meaning: TulaNcingO

Technical information
- ERP: 25 kW
- HAAT: 236.75 m
- Transmitter coordinates: 20°07′03″N 98°20′29″W

Links
- Website: www.ultra.com.mx/radio/tulancingo/

XHTNO-FM is a radio station in Tulancingo, Hidalgo.

== History ==
XHTNO received its concession on July 22, 1992. It was owned by Arturo Emilio Zorrilla Ibarra and broadcast with 3 kW on 96.3 MHz. XHTNO changed frequencies in 2007 to its present 102.9 MHz.
