= KXLM =

Radio station in Oxnard, California

Coordinates: 34.237°N 119.204°W

- Oxnard, California; United States
- Broadcast area: Ventura County
- Frequency: 102.9 MHz
- Branding: Radio Lazer 102.9 FM

Programming
- Format: Regional Mexican

Ownership
- Owner: Lazer Media; (Lazer Licenses, LLC)
- Sister stations: KLJR-FM, KOXR

History
- First air date: August 23, 1991; 34 years ago
- Former call signs: KLSM (August–September 1991)

Technical information
- Licensing authority: FCC
- Facility ID: 34349
- Class: A
- ERP: 5,500 watts
- HAAT: 34 meters (112 ft)

Links
- Public license information: Public file; LMS
- Webcast: Listen Live
- Website: radiolazer.com/oxnard

KXLM (102.9 FM) is a radio station broadcasting Regional Mexican format. It is licensed to Oxnard, California, United States, and serves Ventura County California. The station is owned by Lazer Media.
