= KDIF-LP =

Low-power radio station in Phoenix, Arizona

- Phoenix, Arizona; United States
- Frequency: 102.9 MHz
- Branding: 102.9 KDIF

Programming
- Format: Community radio

Ownership
- Owner: Arizona Interfaith Alliance for Worker Justice

History
- First air date: 2017

Technical information
- Licensing authority: FCC
- Facility ID: 195405
- Class: L1
- ERP: 100 watts
- HAAT: -22 meters
- Transmitter coordinates: 33°23′19″N 112°2′42″W

Links
- Public license information: LMS
- Website: kdif.org

KDIF-LP is a low-power FM radio station on 102.9 FM in Phoenix, Arizona. The station is owned and operated by the Arizona Interfaith Alliance for Worker Justice, with studios and transmitter on South 16th Street in Phoenix.

== History ==
On March 10, 2014, KDIF-LP was granted its original construction permit. The station came to air in March 2017.

Not all areas of the city of Phoenix can receive KDIF-LP; a translator for KIHP 1310 AM also broadcasts on the frequency from Shaw Butte.
