= WPXC (FM) =

- Hyannis, Massachusetts; United States
- Broadcast area: Cape Cod
- Frequency: 102.9 MHz (HD Radio)
- Branding: Pixy 103

Programming
- Format: Mainstream rock
- Subchannels: HD2: Simulcast of WFRQ; HD3: Simulcast of WKFY
- Affiliations: Compass Media Networks; United Stations Radio Networks

Ownership
- Owner: Steve Chessare; (Coxswain Media LLC)
- Sister stations: WFRQ, WHYA, WKFY

History
- First air date: January 7, 1987
- Call sign meaning: "Pixy"

Technical information
- Licensing authority: FCC
- Facility ID: 54620
- Class: B1
- ERP: 6,800 watts
- HAAT: 143.9 meters (472 ft)
- Transmitter coordinates: 41°41′20.4″N 70°20′47.1″W
- Translators: HD2: See WFRQ § Translator; HD3: See WKFY § Translators

Links
- Public license information: Public file; LMS
- Webcast: Listen live
- Website: www.pixy103.com

WPXC (102.9 MHz, "Pixy 103") is an FM radio station broadcasting a mainstream rock format. Licensed to Hyannis, Massachusetts, the station serves the Cape Cod area with its studios located on South Street in Hyannis and its transmitter in West Barnstable.

== History ==
In February 2005, Ernie Boch, Sr. sold WTWV, WDVT, WCOD, and WXTK to Qantum Communications. Due to the FCC's rules on ownership caps, Qantum put WTWV, WDVT, and WPXC up for a pending sale.

In March 2005, Nassau Broadcasting Partners bought the three stations from Qantum Communications. WPXC's sister stations WTWV and WDVT became WHYA and WFRQ.

On May 4, 2012, Nassau Broadcasting and its lenders auctioned off all of their Cape stations to John Garabedian. John Garabedian made no change WPXC's format or staff, but CodComm designed new logos and websites for Pixy 103 and Frank FM.

On May 1, 2014, WPXC started transmitting an HD Radio digital signal. WPXC started simulcasting WFRQ on the HD2, and WKFY on the HD3 to feed the translators on 94.7 (W230AW, now W234DP) and 100.5/103.5 (W263CU)/(W278DW) respectively.

Effective November 30, 2021, CodComm sold WPXC, sister stations WFRQ, WHYA, and WKFY, and three translators to Steve Chessare's Coxswain Communications for $3.2 million.
