= WKFY =

- East Harwich, Massachusetts; United States
- Broadcast area: Cape Cod - Martha's Vineyard
- Frequency: 101.5 MHz
- Branding: Koffee FM

Programming
- Format: Soft adult contemporary
- Network: ABC News Radio

Ownership
- Owner: Steve Chessare; (Coxswain Media LLC)
- Sister stations: WFRQ; WHYA; WPXC

History
- First air date: August 16, 2013; 12 years ago
- Former frequencies: 98.7 MHz (2013–2020)
- Call sign meaning: Reference to "Koffee" branding

Technical information
- Licensing authority: FCC
- Facility ID: 189527
- Class: A
- ERP: 6,000 watts
- HAAT: 87.3 meters (286 ft)
- Transmitter coordinates: 41°47′29.7″N 69°59′36″W
- Translator: See § Translators
- Repeater: 102.9 WPXC-HD3 (Hyannis)

Links
- Public license information: Public file; LMS
- Webcast: Listen live
- Website: www.koffeefmcapecod.com

WKFY (101.5 FM) – branded as Koffee FM – is a commercial radio station licensed to East Harwich, Massachusetts, serving Cape Cod and Martha's Vineyard. It is owned by Coxswain Communications, headed by Steve Chessare, through licensee Coxswain Media LLC. It airs a soft adult contemporary radio format, featuring a blend of mellow oldies, primarily from the 1960s, 70s and 80s. The studios and offices are on South Street in Hyannis.

WKFY is a Class A FM station, with an effective radiated power (ERP) of 6,000 watts. The main transmitter is on Locust Road in Orleans. The station is also heard on two FM translators at 100.5 and 103.5 MHz.

== History ==
WKFY signed on the air on August 16, 2013, at 98.7 MHz. It began with a stunt loop of "Old Cape Cod" by Patti Page. The official format debuted on August 19. The format is designed to include "oldies, classic album cuts and modern artists loved by older listeners". On June 9, 2014, WKFY extended its signal with the use of translator W263CU (100.5 MHz) in Hyannis, fed from WKFY's 101.5 signal. A second translator, W278DW (103.5 MHz) in Vineyard Haven is fed via 102.9 WPXC-HD3.

On February 19, 2020, WKFY moved from 98.7 to 101.5 MHz while also moving to a new transmitter site in Orleans. The effective radiated power (ERP) increased from 3,200 watts to 6,000 watts. The height above average terrain (HAAT) was raised from 47.3 meters (155 ft) to 87.3 meters (286 ft), improving Koffee FM's signal in the Outer Cape. Two FM translators also began carrying WKFY, helping to boost WKFY’s coverage area in the Upper Cape, Mid-Cape and Martha’s Vineyard.

== Translators ==
Broadcast translator for WKFY
Call sign	Frequency	City of license	FID	ERP (W)	HAAT	Class	Transmitter coordinates	FCC info	Notes
W263CU	100.5 FM	Hyannis, Massachusetts	140925	250	144 m (472 ft)	D	41°41′20″N 70°20′49″W	LMS	HAAT info

Broadcast translator for WPXC-HD3
Call sign	Frequency	City of license	FID	ERP (W)	HAAT	Class	Transmitter coordinates	FCC info	Notes
W278DW	103.5 FM	Vineyard Haven, Massachusetts	140919	250	136 m (446 ft)	D	41°33′31″N 70°35′44″W	LMS	HAAT info and frequency change info

== Previous logos ==

^{Logo used until addition of W300BE (107.9) which is now on 103.5 FM according to on-air announcements}.
