= CFOI-FM =

Christian radio station in Quebec City, Quebec

Coordinates: 46°46′15″N 71°18′20″W

- Quebec City, Quebec; Canada
- Frequency: 104.1 MHz
- Branding: Foi FM

Programming
- Language: French
- Format: Christian radio

Ownership
- Owner: Association d'Églises baptistes reformées du Québec

Technical information
- Licensing authority: CRTC
- Class: LP
- ERP: 26 watts; 42 watts (peak)
- HAAT: 113.3 metres (372 ft)
- Translator: 102.9 MHz (Saint-Jérôme, Quebec)

Links
- Webcast: Listen live
- Website: foifm.com

CFOI-FM (104.1 FM) is a radio station that broadcasts a Christian radio format in Quebec City, Quebec, Canada. Owned by Association d'Églises baptistes reformées du Québec (Baptist Reformed Church Association of Quebec), the station received CRTC approval on January 24, 2007.

On November 18, 2009, CFOI-FM applied to change its frequency from 96.9 to 104.1 MHz, which received CRTC approval on February 19, 2010.

On December 3, 2010, CFOI-FM applied to add a new FM broadcast relay station transmitter at 102.9 MHz in Saint-Jérôme, Quebec, which received approval on January 21, 2011.
