= WBWO-LP =

- Moundsville, West Virginia; United States
- Broadcast area: Moundsville, West Virginia; Glen Dale, West Virginia; Shadyside, Ohio
- Frequency: 102.9 MHz
- Branding: 102.9 FM

Programming
- Format: Oldies

Ownership
- Owner: Grave Creek B'Nai Noach

History
- First air date: October 16, 2014

Technical information
- Licensing authority: FCC
- Facility ID: 192526
- Class: L1
- ERP: 100 watts
- HAAT: 0.6 meters (2.0 ft)
- Transmitter coordinates: 39°57′0.0″N 80°46′16.0″W

Links
- Public license information: LMS

WBWO-LP is a broadcast radio station licensed to Moundsville, West Virginia, serving Moundsville and Glen Dale in West Virginia and Shadyside in Ohio. WBWO-LP is owned and operated by Grave Creek B'Nai Noach. The station broadcasts an Oldies format.
