= WCOD-FM =

- Hyannis, Massachusetts; United States
- Broadcast area: Cape Cod
- Frequency: 106.1 MHz
- Branding: 106 WCOD

Programming
- Language: English
- Format: Hot adult contemporary
- Affiliations: Premiere Networks

Ownership
- Owner: iHeartMedia, Inc.; (iHM Licenses, LLC)
- Sister stations: WCIB; WEII; WXTK

History
- First air date: June 2, 1967
- Call sign meaning: Cape Cod

Technical information
- Licensing authority: FCC
- Facility ID: 29568
- Class: B
- ERP: 50,000 watts
- HAAT: 131 meters (430 ft)
- Transmitter coordinates: 41.7290°N 70.1667°W

Links
- Public license information: Public file; LMS
- Webcast: Listen live (via iHeartRadio)
- Website: 106wcod.iheart.com

WCOD-FM (106.1 MHz) is a hot adult contemporary formatted radio station licensed to Hyannis, Massachusetts. It is owned by iHeartMedia, Inc. WCOD's sister stations include WEII, WCIB, and WXTK. Its transmitter and studio are located separately in Dennis.

== History ==
Former logo

One of the oldest FM signals on Cape Cod, WCOD was owned by Boch Broadcasting before moving to Qantum Communications in 2005. In 2009, CHR sister station WRZE became WEII, an all-sports station.

On May 15, 2014, Qantum Communications announced that it would sell its 29 stations, including WCOD-FM, to Clear Channel Communications (now iHeartMedia), in a transaction connected to Clear Channel's sale of WALK AM-FM in Patchogue, New York to Connoisseur Media via Qantum. The transaction was consummated on September 9, 2014.
