= KNFT-FM =

- Bayard, New Mexico; United States
- Frequency: 102.9 MHz
- Branding: Today's Best Country

Programming
- Format: Country

Ownership
- Owner: Skywest Licenses New Mexico LLC

History
- First air date: 1982
- Former call signs: KLCJ

Technical information
- Licensing authority: FCC
- Facility ID: 28126
- Class: C1
- ERP: 5,100 watts
- HAAT: 481 meters (1,578 ft)
- Transmitter coordinates: 32°51′49″N 108°14′27″W

Links
- Public license information: Public file; LMS
- Website: Silver City Radio Website

KNFT-FM (102.9 FM) is a radio station broadcasting a Country music format. Licensed to Bayard, New Mexico, United States, the station is currently owned by Skywest Licenses New Mexico LLC.
