= List of radio stations in Connecticut =

The following is a list of FCC-licensed radio stations in the U.S. state of Connecticut, which can be sorted by their call signs, frequencies, cities of license, licensees, and programming formats.

== List of radio stations ==
Call sign	Frequency	City of license	Licensee	Format
WACC-LP	107.7 FM	Enfield	Asnuntuck Community College	Alternative rock
WADS	690 AM	Ansonia	Radio Amor, Inc.	Spanish Religious
WAPJ	89.9 FM	Torrington	Torrington Community Radio Foundation, Inc.	Community
WATR	1320 AM	Waterbury	WATR Radio, LLC	Full Service
WATX	1220 AM	Hamden	Clark Media, LLC	Oldies
WAVZ	1300 AM	New Haven	iHM Licenses, LLC	Sports (FSR)
WAXB	850 AM	Ridgefield	The Berkshire Broadcasting Corp.	Spanish adult hits
WBMW	106.5 FM	Pawcatuck	Red Wolf Broadcasting Corporation	Adult contemporary
WBOM	1470 AM	Meriden	Red Wolf Broadcasting Corporation	Urban adult contemporary
WCCC	106.9 FM	Hartford	Educational Media Foundation	Contemporary Christian (K-Love)
WCNI	90.9 FM	New London	Connecticut College Community Radio, Inc.	Freeform
WCTY	97.7 FM	Norwich	Hall Communications, Inc.	Country
WDAQ	98.3 FM	Danbury	The Berkshire Broadcasting Corp.	Hot AC
WDJW	89.7 FM	Somers	WDJW-Somers High School	High School
WDRC	1360 AM	Hartford	Red Wolf Broadcasting Corporation	Talk
WDRC-FM	102.9 FM	Hartford	Red Wolf Broadcasting Corporation	Classic rock
WDUP-LP	92.9 FM	New London	HP-NL Communications, Inc.	Hip Hop/R&B
WEBE	107.9 FM	Westport	Connoisseur Media Licenses, LLC	Adult contemporary
WECS	90.1 FM	Willimantic	Eastern Connecticut State University	Variety
WEDW-FM	88.5 FM	Stamford	Connecticut Public Broadcasting, Inc.	News/Talk (Public radio)
WELI	960 AM	New Haven	iHM Licenses, LLC	News/Talk
WERB	94.5 FM	Berlin	Berlin Board of Education	Educational/Freeform
WESU	88.1 FM	Middletown	Wesleyan	Freeform/News/Talk
WEZN-FM	99.9 FM	Bridgeport	Connoisseur Media Licenses, LLC	Hot AC
WFAR	93.3 FM	Danbury	Danbury Community Radio, Inc.	Christian/Ethnic
WFCS	107.7 FM	New Britain	Central Connecticut State University	Educational
WFIF	1500 AM	Milford	K.W. Dolmar Broadcasting Co., Inc.	Religious
WFNW	1380 AM	Naugatuck	Candido Dias Carrelo	Portuguese contemporary
WGCH	1490 AM	Greenwich	Forte Family Broadcasting, Inc.	News/Talk
WGRS	91.5 FM	Guilford	Town of Monroe, Connecticut	Classical
WGSK	90.1 FM	South Kent	Town of Monroe, Connecticut	Classical
WGZO-LP	98.7 FM	Bloomfield	Connecticut Valley Hispanic Outreach	Gospel
WHCN	105.9 FM	Hartford	iHM Licenses, LLC	Classic hits
WHDD	1020 AM	Sharon	Tri-State Public Communications, Inc.	NPR Public/Community Radio
WHDD-FM	91.9 FM	Sharon	Tri-State Public Communications, Inc.	NPR Public/Community Radio
WHUS	91.7 FM	Storrs	The Board of Trustees, The University of Connecticut	Variety
WICC	600 AM	Bridgeport	Connoisseur Media Licenses, LLC	News/Talk
WICC-FM	95.9 FM	Southport	Connoisseur Media Licenses, LLC	News/Talk
WICH	1310 AM	Norwich	Hall Communications, Inc.	Talk/Nostalgia
WIHS	104.9 FM	Middletown	Connecticut Radio Fellowship, Inc.	Christian
WILI	1400 AM	Willimantic	Hall Communications, Inc.	News/Talk/Sports
WILI-FM	98.3 FM	Willimantic	Hall Communications, Inc.	Top 40 (CHR)
WINE	940 AM	Brookfield	International Church of the Grace of God, Inc.	Portuguese talk
WINY	1350 AM	Putnam	Osbrey Broadcasting Company	Full Service/Adult contemporary
WJMJ	88.9 FM	Hartford	St. Thomas Seminary	Catholic
WJYC-LP	105.3 FM	Terryville	Riverside Baptist Church	Christian
WKCI-FM	101.3 FM	Hamden	iHM Licenses, LLC	Top 40 (CHR)
WKGG	90.9 FM	Bolton	Revival Christian Ministries, Inc.	Spanish Contemporary Christian
WKND	1480 AM	Windsor	Gois Broadcasting of Connecticut, LLC	RnB and gospel music
WKNL	100.9 FM	New London	Hall Communications, Inc.	Classic hits
WKSS	95.7 FM	Hartford–Meriden	iHM Licenses, LLC	Top 40 (CHR)
WKZE-FM	98.1 FM	Salisbury	Willpower Radio, L.L.C.	Album Adult Alternative
WLAD	800 AM	Danbury	The Berkshire Broadcasting Corp.	News/Talk
WLAT	910 AM	New Britain	Gois Broadcasting Of Connecticut, LLC	Spanish tropical
WLIS	1420 AM	Old Saybrook	Crossroads Communications of Old Saybrook, LLC	Talk/Personality
WMAS-FM	94.7 FM	Enfield	Audacy License, LLC	Adult contemporary
WMNR	88.1 FM	Monroe	Town of Monroe, Connecticut	Classical
WMOS	102.3 FM	Stonington	Radio License Holding CBC, LLC	Classic rock
WMRD	1150 AM	Middletown	Crossroads Communications, LLC	Talk/Personality
WMRQ-FM	104.1 FM	Waterbury	Red Wolf Broadcasting Corporation	Alternative rock
WNEZ	1230 AM	Manchester	Gois Broadcasting Of Connecticut, LLC	Spanish Variety
WNHA-LP	107.5 FM	New Haven	Alma Radio Inc.	Spanish Religious
WNHH-LP	103.5 FM	New Haven	Online Journalism Project, Inc.	Variety
WNHU	88.7 FM	West Haven	University of New Haven	Variety
WNLC	98.7 FM	East Lyme	Hall Communications, Inc.	Classic rock
WNLK	1350 AM	Norwalk	Veritas Catholic Network, Inc.	Christian radio
WNPR	90.5 FM	Meriden	Connecticut Public Broadcasting, Inc.	News/Talk (Public radio)
WNTY	990 AM	Southington	Red Wolf Broadcasting Corporation	Oldies
WNWW	1290 AM	West Hartford	University of Northwestern – St. Paul	Religious
WONH-LP	103.5 FM	New Haven	Pequenas Ligas Hispanas de New Haven Inc	Spanish Religious
WPKN	89.5 FM	Bridgeport	WPKN, Inc.	Variety
WPKT	89.1 FM	Norwich	Connecticut Public Broadcasting, Inc.	News/Talk (Public radio)
WPLR	99.1 FM	New Haven	Connoisseur Media Licenses, LLC	Mainstream rock
WPOP	1410 AM	Hartford	iHM Licenses, LLC	Talk/Sports
WPRF-LP	96.9 FM	New Britain	La Nueva Radio Restauracion 1620 AM Inc	Spanish Religious
WPRX	1120 AM	Bristol	Nievezquez Productions, Inc.	Spanish Tropical
WQAQ	98.1 FM	Hamden	Quinnipiac University	Open
WQGN-FM	105.5 FM	Groton	Radio License Holding CBC, LLC	Top 40 (CHR)
WQQQ	103.3 FM	Sharon	WAMC, Inc.	Public radio
WQTQ	89.9 FM	Hartford	Hartford Board of Education	Urban contemporary
WRCH	100.5 FM	New Britain	Audacy License, LLC	Adult contemporary
WRKI	95.1 FM	Brookfield	Townsquare License, LLC	Classic rock
WRTC-FM	89.3 FM	Hartford	Trustees of Trinity College	Diversified
WRXC	90.1 FM	Shelton	Town of Monroe, Connecticut	Classical
WRYM	840 AM	New Britain	Trignition Media, LLC	Spanish Tropical
WSDK	1550 AM	Bloomfield	Blount Masscom, Inc.	Religious
WSGG	89.3 FM	Norfolk	Revival Christian Ministries, Inc.	Spanish Contemporary Christian
WSHU	1260 AM	Westport	Sacred Heart University, Inc.	Public radio
WSHU-FM	91.1 FM	Fairfield	Sacred Heart University, Inc.	News/Talk/Classical
WSIM-LP	103.5 FM	Simsbury	Simsbury Fire District	Variety
WSLX	91.9 FM	New Canaan	St. Luke's Foundation, Inc.	Variety
WSNG	610 AM	Torrington	Red Wolf Broadcasting Corporation	Talk
WSTC	1400 AM	Stamford	Sacred Heart University, Incorporated	Christian
WTIC	1080 AM	Hartford	Audacy License, LLC	News/Talk
WTIC-FM	96.5 FM	Hartford	Audacy License, LLC	Hot AC
WUCS	97.9 FM	Windsor Locks	iHM Licenses, LLC	Sports (FSR)
WVOF	88.5 FM	Fairfield	Fairfield University	Public radio
WWCO	1240 AM	Waterbury	Trignition Media, LLC	Tropical music
WWMM-LP	107.5 FM	Collinsville	Huckleberry Hill Music Society Inc.	Community Radio / Talk
WWPT	90.3 FM	Westport	Westport Ct. Board of Education	High School
WWUH	91.3 FM	West Hartford	University of Hartford	Alternative
WWYZ	92.5 FM	Waterbury	iHM Licenses, LLC	Country
WXCI	91.7 FM	Danbury	Western Connecticut State University	Educational
WXLM	980 AM	Groton	Radio License Holding CBC, LLC	News/Talk
WYBC	1340 AM	New Haven	Yale Broadcasting Company, Inc.	News/Talk
WYBC-FM	94.3 FM	New Haven	Yale Broadcasting Company, Inc.	Urban adult contemporary
WZBG	97.3 FM	Litchfield	Local Girls and Boys Broadcasting Corporation	Adult contemporary
WZKZ	1450 AM	Bridgeport	Trignition Media, LLC	Spanish Tropical
WZMX	93.7 FM	Hartford	Audacy License, LLC	Rhythmic Top 40

== Defunct ==
- WAAQ
- WAOF
- WBIB-FM (1947–1954)
- WBRL
- WBVC
- WBZY (1947–1964)
- WCAC
- WCFV-LP
- WCJ
- WCON
- WCSE-LP (2002–2022)
- WCTF
- WCWS
- WDAK (1922–1924)
- WDJZ (1977–2016)
- WELI-FM
- WFHA
- WGCH-FM
- WHNM
- WICT-LP
- WKAX
- WKKA
- WKKK (unaired)
- WKNB-FM
- WLAC
- WLCR
- WLIZ
- WLNV
- WMDX-LP
- WNLC (1936–1997)
- WNLN-LP
- WOAS
- WOGS-LP
- WQAD
- WQQW
- WQSA-LP
- WSAG
- WSCH-FM
- WSPV-LP
- WTHT (1936–1954)
- WTHT-FM (1948–1950)
- WWBW-LP (2005–2022)
- WWEB
- WXRN
- WYBC 640 AM
- WYPH-LP (2014–2022)
- WZMA-LP
