= WNEZ (disambiguation) =

WNEZ is a radio station (1230 AM) licensed to Manchester, Connecticut, United States. It may also refer to the following broadcasting stations in the United States:

- WKND, a radio station (1480 AM) licensed to Windsor, Connecticut, which held the call sign WNEZ from 2004 to 2007
- WLAT, a radio station (910 AM) licensed to New Britain, Connecticut, which held the call sign WNEZ from 1990 to 2001
- WKXC-FM, a radio station (99.5 FM) licensed to Aiken, South Carolina, which held the call sign WNEZ from 1974 to 1998
