= WLAT (disambiguation) =

WLAT is a radio station (910 AM) licensed to New Britain, Connecticut, United States. It may also refer to the following broadcasting stations in the United States:

- WNEZ, a radio station (1230 AM) licensed to Manchester, Connecticut, which held the call sign WLAT from 1991 to 2001
- WYAV, a radio station (104.1 FM) licensed to Myrtle Beach, South Carolina, which held the call sign WLAT from 1978 to 1984
- WPJS, a radio station (1330 AM) licensed to Conway, South Carolina, which held the call sign WLAT from 1945 to 1988
