= WHDD =

WHDD may refer to:

- WHDD (AM), a radio station (1020 AM) licensed to Sharon, Connecticut, United States
- WHDD-FM, a radio station (91.9 FM) licensed to Sharon, Connecticut, United States
