= WILI-FM =

- Willimantic, Connecticut; United States
- Broadcast area: New London, Connecticut
- Frequency: 98.3 MHz
- Branding: Today's Hit Music i-98.3

Programming
- Format: Top 40

Ownership
- Owner: Hall Communications, Inc.
- Sister stations: WILI

History
- First air date: June 1975; 51 years ago
- Former call signs: WXLS (1975–1980); WNOU (1980–1985)
- Call sign meaning: Willimantic

Technical information
- Licensing authority: FCC
- Facility ID: 66179
- Class: A
- ERP: 1,050 watts
- HAAT: 160 meters (520 ft)
- Transmitter coordinates: 41°41′0.4″N 72°12′55.3″W

Links
- Public license information: Public file; LMS
- Webcast: Listen live
- Website: www.hitmusici983.com

WILI-FM (98.3 FM, "Hit Music i-98.3") is a radio station broadcasting a Top 40 format. Licensed to the village of Willimantic, Connecticut, it serves eastern Connecticut. It is the sister station to WILI (1400 AM). The station is currently owned by Hall Communications, Inc. The studios are located on Main Street in Willimantic, near the Willimantic Footbridge.

== History ==
The history of 98.3 FM in Willimantic began in 1971, with two competing proposals for the allocation of 98.3 in Connecticut: a proposal for the allocation to go to Willimantic submitted by Colin K. Rice and his family's Nutmeg Broadcasting, and a competing proposal from a group headed by Randal Mayer of WWUH and WHCN and Kenneth N. Dawson of WKND to allocate the frequency to Enfield. In early 1972, the Federal Communications Commission (FCC) allocated the frequency to Willimantic, making 98.3 the only FM in Windham County.

By December 1972, Nutmeg Broadcasting and the newly formed Windham Broadcast Group were competing for the 98.3 license in Willimantic. The Windham Broadcast Group was also backed by Mayer and Dawson, the petitioners to have the frequency allocated to Enfield. Also in 1972, Nutmeg Broadcasting received approval to build an FM tower on Gates Road at the site of two microwave towers owned by Southern New England Telephone, but allowed the permit to expire.

The FCC decided in favor of The Windham Broadcast Group in February 1975. The station was assigned the call letters WXLS, and went on the air featuring a beautiful music format in June 1975 with studios at 1491 West Main Street, Willimantic (across from Capitol Chrysler Dodge Jeep, currently a drug treatment facility) and with transmitting facilities on Hosmer Mountain, off Route 289 in Willimantic. The station broadcast with 3,000 watts from a single bay circularly polarized antenna, powered by a Rockwell-Collins 831F-2 Generation 4 transmitter that could put out 12,000 watts. Several engineers in the area reported "stronger than usual" power output from the site. Immediately residents complained of severe interference to television reception caused by WXLS. General manager Peter Aucion met with the town's Common Council four weeks after the station took to the air and agreed to provide $5,000.00 in rebates to residents to purchase antenna filters to block out 98.3. In 1975 WXLS applied to build a tower on Gates Hill in Lebanon, however were denied a permit by the Zoning Board of Appeals.

In August 1978 it was announced that Nutmeg Broadcasting had filed to purchase WXLS from the XLS Broadcasting Corp. Also in 1978, Nutmeg applied to build a 300-foot (91 m) tower off Route 87 in Columbia to improve the signal to the west. Fierce resident opposition to the tower led to the Planning and Zoning Commission denying the application for the tower in November 1978. WILI re-applied for an FM tower permit on Gates Hill in Lebanon, and were once again approved. By 1979 a $10,000 attachment had been filed against WXLS for unpaid bills for syndicated programming provided by Peters Productions of San Diego, California.

However, Nutmeg once again lost out on the $200,000 purchase of WXLS, and the station was sold to Delta Communications Co. of Washington, D.C., in 1979. Delta was a minority owned company, making the station the state's first minority owned FM station. The station was sold for $175,000 under the FCC's distressed sale policy, allowing stations facing license renewal hearings to avoid losing their license by selling to minority owned companies at prices below market value. WXLS and co-owned WKND were facing allegations of fraudulent billing practices and staff mismanagement. Both stations were sold to separate minority-owned companies.

Studios were relocated to 75 Bridge Street at the foot of Hosmer Mountain, and call letters were changed to WNOU on June 10, 1980. The station dropped beautiful music and changed to urban adult contemporary as "New 98".

On the morning of February 21, 1985, the morning team of Ray Pender and Mark Virdone took to the air to describe the financial disrepair and mismanagement of WNOU, staying on the air until 12 noon, calling for any investors to come forward to purchase the station. Dubbed the "98gate", the hosts invited in listeners and media crews, including WFSB (channel 3). Telephones had already been disconnected by the telephone company for nonpayment. Owner Sullivan Brown came from his home in Bloomfield and removed the personalities from the station and took over broadcasting, as if nothing had happened. Around 3 pm, midday personality and program director Gregg Dixon forcefully kicked in the door to the control room and removed the power supply to the control board, taking the station off the air. New 98 never returned to the air. At the time, Brown admitted that the station was under foreclosure proceedings.

On July 31, 1985, the FCC approved the sale of silent WNOU to Nutmeg Broadcasting Co. for $645,000, including the payment of federal back taxes owed by Delta. According to an article in the Hartford Courant, the majority of the purchase price was used to pay off the debts of the financially troubled station. The call letters were changed to WILI-FM on October 7, 1985, and the station returned to the air as a simulcast of WILI.

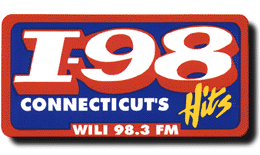
Former logo of the radio station used until April 2003

In January 1986, the simulcast was split, with WILI becoming an adult contemporary station featuring more talk programming, and WILI-FM became a contemporary hit radio station billed as "I-98". Separate studios were built in a closet at 948 Main Street while new facilities were built at 720 Main Street; both stations would move to the new location in the fall of 1987.

In May 2005, Connecticut-based Hall Communications reached an agreement to acquire WILI and WILI-FM from Nutmeg Broadcasting Co. At the time of the purchase, Hall already owned WICH and WCTY in Norwich and WNLC and WKNL in New London. In addition, Hall owns a number of stations in medium-sized markets along the eastern seaboard from Vermont to Florida. Hall acquired the stations from the Rice family for $1.8 million; it continues to operate Nutmeg Broadcasting as a subsidiary, and has maintained all local services and facilities at 720 Main Street in Willimantic.
