= WKZE =

WKZE has been the callsign of two radio stations in northwest Connecticut which also serve New York's Hudson Valley, and Berkshire County, Massachusetts.

- WHDD (AM), the former WKZE (AM), 1020 kHz Sharon (which airs local block programming)
- WKZE-FM 98.1 MHz Salisbury (which airs a noted Adult Album Alternative format)

WKZE is also the original 1980-83 call for WKPE-FM "Cape 104" in South Yarmouth, Massachusetts
