= WNLC (AM) =

Radio station in New London, Connecticut (1936–1997)

- New London, Connecticut; United States
- Frequency: 1510 kHz

Ownership
- Owner: Hall Communications

History
- First air date: September 13, 1936
- Last air date: 1997
- Former call signs: WWJY (1998)
- Former frequencies: 1500 kHz (1936–1941); 1490 kHz (1941–1961)

WNLC was a radio station broadcasting at 1510 AM in New London, Connecticut, United States. It broadcast from 1936 to 1997, having been the first station established in New London, and was last owned by Hall Communications.

== Early years ==
WNLC signed on September 13, 1936, broadcasting on 1500 kHz with 100 watts during the daytime only. The station was owned by the Thames Broadcasting Corporation and built by Daniel E. Noble, an engineer who had built WCAC, an early educational station at the University of Connecticut. The transmitter was grounded to the nearby railroad tracks. Original studios were in the Mohican Hotel with transmitter at Winthrop Point. It was the first radio station in the state east of the Connecticut River. The station maintained affiliations with the Mutual Broadcasting System and the regional Yankee and Colonial networks.

The 1938 New England hurricane slammed into New London with force. It knocked WNLC off the air for three weeks and crumpled its tower, while the storm surge battered the transmitter building and washed out the front and back walls. The station continued to operate from its studios in the Mohican Hotel, broadcasting news on the hotel's speaker. It was able to return to the air when a shortwave transmitter arrived from WOR, fed by power from the hotel; other outlets in the region also aided in restoring operations. The station was permitted to operate at night in 1939 and with 250 watts in 1940; NARBA reallocation moved it and other stations on 1500 to 1490 kHz effective March 29, 1941.

WNLC was prepared to move from the world of radio to television. Gerald J. Morey, executive of Thames, disclosed in 1952 that the station had planned for potential television facilities with an audio chain ready for television, a partly built FM radio site on Raymond Hill, and sufficient studio space. The television station, however, was never built, and in November 1956, the Federal Communications Commission (FCC) ordered WNLC and others to build their television stations or lose their permits.

Instead, Morey focused on improving the WNLC AM facility, especially after WSUB (980 AM) went on the air from nearby Groton in 1957. In August 1958, it filed to move to 1510 kHz, relocate its transmitter, and broadcast with 5,000 watts; the FCC granted the application in November 1960. The frequency change cleared the way for a new station to open at Greenwich on 1490. The new facility was highly directional to the southeast, operating from an eight-tower array; four towers were used in daytime operation and six at night. A second boost took place in 1964, this time to a daytime power of 10,000 watts. WNLC got a sister FM station on December 29, 1969, when WTYD (100.9 FM) began broadcasting.

== New owners, new formats ==
WNLC-WTYD entered into negotiations in 1975 to sell the Mercury Broadcasting Corporation based in Maryland, after nearly 40 years under the same ownership that had founded the station in 1936. The sale was triggered because 60-year old Gerald Morey, who had founded the station when he was 20, was in poor health. Thames sold the stations to Mercury the next year for $1.1 million. The FM continued with its "easy-listening" programming, while WNLC's musical programming shifted from Top 40 toward adult contemporary. One night in 1977, the station went off the air for two hours as a safety precaution while rescue workers sought to talk a 30-year old man who made a living building and painting radio towers from committing suicide by jumping off the 180-foot (55 m) mast.

WNLC was sold twice in a five-year span in the 1980s. Norman Drubner, a real estate investor from Waterbury, bought it and WTYD from Mercury in 1984. Two years later, Drubner sold WNLC and WTYD to Andross Communications for $5.2 million; by this time, the AM station was airing an oldies format, with the adult contemporary music having moved to WTYD. Hall Communications of Norwich purchased the stations for $3.5 million in 1994, adding to the two stations that it already owned in Norwich.

== Closure and move of WNLC to FM ==
In its final years of operation, WNLC aired an adult standards format, after having flipped to news/talk prior to the Hall acquisition. In late 1997, however, Hall opted to move WNLC and its standards programming to the FM band. It did so by acquiring WXZR (98.7 FM), a satellite-fed Z Rock station, for $2 million; that September, WXZR became WNLC-FM.

Hall then took the AM facility silent in an attempt to repair the eight-tower directional array at Waterford, which had been malfunctioning since a 1997 fire. The call letters on the facility were changed to WWJY. In April, Hall surrendered its nighttime operating authority, which would have left the station a daytime-only outlet using three of the eight towers. However, it never returned to operation, and it was deleted.
