= WFCS =

- New Britain, Connecticut; United States
- Broadcast area: New Britain–Hartford
- Frequency: 107.7 MHz
- Branding: 107.7 The Edge

Programming
- Format: Educational

Ownership
- Owner: Central Connecticut State University

History
- First air date: 1972
- Call sign meaning: '"(W) From Central State"

Technical information
- Licensing authority: FCC
- Facility ID: 9867
- Class: D
- ERP: 36 watts
- HAAT: 33.0 meters (108.3 ft)
- Transmitter coordinates: 41°41′36″N 72°45′49″W

Links
- Public license information: Public file; LMS
- Webcast: Listen Live
- Website: www.wfcsradio.com

WFCS (107.7 FM), known as 107.7 The Edge is a non-commercial college radio station licensed to New Britain, Connecticut, United States. The station is owned by Central Connecticut State University.

Programming is produced by students, faculty and staff of CCSU and the station has a diverse radio format including alternative rock, urban, world, oldies, etc.

== History ==
This station began in the late 1940s, as a carrier current AM station. The college, originally the New Britain Normal School changed names to the Teacher's College of Connecticut (TCC) in 1929. The original call letters of station were WTCC, a call sign now held by the station of Springfield Technical Community College. The station's studios were located in East Hall. In 1959 TCC became Central Connecticut State College. The call letters were changed to WCCS. When the new campus Student Center opened in the early 1960s, the studios were relocated. The station was affiliated with the Intercollegiate Broadcasting System (IBS). In 1969 plans were started to move from AM to FM. Originally the WCCS call letters were requested. Local Hartford radio stations WCCC and WCCC-FM thought this would cause too much confusion, so the call letters WFCS were assigned.

The station began broadcasting as WFCS on 90.1 FM with 10 watts in 1972, but had to vacate the frequency in 1980 due to FCC rule changes for low power non-commercial stations and to make room for Connecticut Public Radio which had increased its power from Middlefield. WFCS then moved to 97.9 and operated there for a decade until it was forced to move again due to its "secondary" status to make room for a new commercial radio station in Enfield, Connecticut, that was about to begin broadcasting on the same frequency. The WFCS application to move to its current dial position at 107.7 was prepared and filed by Carmine Iannace in 1987, while he was student at CCSU. Originally a move to the WTIC-TV tower in Farmington was proposed to dramatically increase the WFCS broadcast range, but it was rejected by the Federal Communications Commission (FCC). Carmine was program director in addition to being chief engineer during his tenure at WFCS and was responsible, along with other station members at the time, for bringing the cutting edge, "new music" or alternative rock to WFCS and the New Britain–Hartford radio market in the 1980s. Today, WFCS broadcast 24/7 with a combination of live broadcasts and automated programming. Sundays feature a veteran group of broadcasters which combined, have logged over 110 years on the air at the station.

Throughout the 1990s and early 2000s, WFCS continued to focus on being a source of alternative music for the area. With a strong injection of heavier music, WFCS was highly regarded as a prominent college station for heavy rock music while still containing the variety that carries the station today. In 2017, the station rebranded as "107.7 The Edge".
