= WTMI =

WTMI may refer to:

- an acronym abbreviating the phrase "way too much information"
- WTMI (FM), a radio station (88.7 FM) licensed to serve Fleming, New York, United States
- WFEZ (FM), a radio station (93.1 FM) licensed to serve Miami, Florida, United States, which held the call sign WTMI until 2002
- WNWW, a radio station (1290 AM) licensed to serve West Hartford, Connecticut, United States, which held the call sign WTMI from 2002 until 2007
