= WDZK =

WDZK may refer to:

- WDZK-LP, a defunct low-power radio station (101.7 FM) formerly licensed to serve Madison, Alabama, United States
- WSDK, a radio station (1550 AM) licensed to serve Bloomfield, Connecticut, United States, which held the call sign WDZK from 1998 to 2011
- WBT-FM, a radio station (99.3 FM) licensed to serve Chester, South Carolina, United States, which held the call sign WDZK when it signed on in 1969
