= Hall Communications =

American radio broadcast company

Hall Communications, Inc.
- Type: Private
- Industry: Radio broadcasting
- Founded: 1964
- Headquarters: Lakeland, Florida, U.S.
- Key people: Robert M. Hall, founder Bonnie Hall Rowbotham, president Art Rowbotham, chair
- Products: Radio
- Website: hallradio.com

Hall Communications, Inc. is a broadcasting company based in Lakeland, Florida. The company currently owns 17 radio stations in Polk County, Florida; eastern Connecticut; New Bedford, Massachusetts; and Burlington, Vermont.

== History ==
The company was founded in 1964 when Robert M. Hall, founder of The Hall Syndicate (a major newspaper syndicate), purchased WICH, his first radio station in Connecticut. In 1967, Hall would sell off his syndication company to Field Enterprises, in order to concentrate more on broadcasting.

By 1971, Hall Communications, Inc. had grown to include WICH and WICH-FM in Norwich, Connecticut; WNBH and WNBH-FM in New Bedford, Massachusetts; WMMW in Meriden, Connecticut; WETE in Knoxville, Tennessee; WUSJ in Lockport, New York; and WBVP and WBVP-FM, Beaver Falls, Pennsylvania. WMMW was sold at some point in the early 1970s. WETE was sold in 1976 to Basic Media, Inc. That same year, Hall purchased WGAL and WGAL-FM, Lancaster, Pennsylvania.

Hall resigned as President in 1991 and Chair in 1998, turning the company over to his daughter Bonnie Hall Rowbotham and her husband Art.

Hall Communications, Inc. operates a wholly owned subsidiary: Nutmeg Broadcasting Company, licensee of WILI and WILI-FM, which was purchased from the Rice family in 2005.

In addition to their 21 radio stations, Hall Communications is also the 60% majority owner of Cross Country Communications, formerly licensee of WKZA, Lakewood, New York and WLKW-FM, Celoron, New York.

== Acquisitions and sales ==
WLVL Lockport was sold in 1981. Also in 1981, Hall relocated to Lakeland, Florida, following the acquisition of its first two Florida properties, WONN and WPCV, in 1981.

In 1983, WJOY and WQCR (FM) in Burlington, Vermont were purchased for $2.2 million.

WBVP and WWKS, Beaver Falls, Pennsylvania were sold to M.T. Communications in 1985.

In 1995, Hall purchased now-silent WNLC and WTYD in New London, Connecticut. WXZR, East Lyme, Connecticut was purchased in 1998 to replace WNLC. Also in 1995, stations WWRZ Fort Meade, Florida and WLKF Lakeland, Florida were added to the company's Lakeland cluster and WKOL Plattsburgh, New York was added to the Burlington, Vermont cluster.

In 2001, WHRC in West Warwick, Rhode Island was added to the station's New Bedford/Providence cluster.

In 2005, WIZN and WBTZ were purchased and added to the company's Vermont holdings.

Hall Communications sold WKZA to Media One Group (owners of all of the other commercial stations in the area) and WLKW to Educational Media Foundation in August 2018.

Hall sold WROZ, Lancaster, Pennsylvania to the Educational Media Foundation on July 13, 2021 for $1.725 million. Hall Communications has sold the rest of its Central Pennsylvania cluster to Forever Media. Forever purchased the Sports simulcast “ESPN 92.7” WONN-FM Starview and 1490 WLPA/92.5 W223CH Lancaster for $400,000.

On February 12, 2026, a press release from MARC Radio Group announced that they would be acquiring all of Hall Communications' Florida radio stations.
