= WREF =

WREF may refer to:

- WREF (FM), a radio station (97.7 FM) licensed to serve Sebree, Kentucky, United States
- WAXB, a radio station (850 AM) licensed to serve Ridgefield, Connecticut, United States, which held the call sign WREF from 1984 to 2011
