= WYPH =

WYPH may refer to:

- WYPH-LP, a defunct radio station (102.5 FM) formerly licensed to serve Manchester, Connecticut, United States
- West Yorkshire Playhouse, former name of a theatre in Leeds, England
