= WLAD =

Radio station in Danbury, Connecticut

- Danbury, Connecticut; United States
- Broadcast area: Greater Danbury
- Frequency: 800 kHz

Programming
- Language: English
- Format: News/Talk
- Affiliations: Fox News Radio; Compass Media Networks; Premiere Networks; Radio America; SRN News; Townhall; Westwood One; Danbury Westerners

Ownership
- Owner: The Berkshire Broadcasting Corporation
- Sister stations: WAXB; WDAQ

History
- First air date: October 5, 1947

Technical information
- Licensing authority: FCC
- Facility ID: 65456
- Class: B
- Power: 1,000 watts (day); 286 watts (night)
- Transmitter coordinates: 41°22′27.3″N 73°26′45.4″W
- Translator: 94.1 W231DJ (Danbury)

Links
- Public license information: Public file; LMS
- Webcast: Listen live
- Website: wlad.com

WLAD (800 AM) is a commercial radio station licensed to Danbury, Connecticut, broadcasting a news/talk radio format. WLAD is owned by Berkshire Broadcasting, with its studios and offices are located on Mill Plain Road in Danbury and its transmitter is located on Brushy Hill Road, also in Danbury.

WLAD operates at 1,000 watts using a non-directional antenna; because 800 AM is a clear channel frequency reserved for Mexico and Canada. WLAD must reduce power at night to 286 watts. In early 2017, WLAD began simulcasting on an FM translator, W231DJ at 94.1 MHz.

== History ==
On June 17, 1947, the Berkshire Broadcasting Corporation received a construction permit to build a new radio station in Danbury. It was the second attempt by the company to secure a radio station; it had lost out on an application for 1490 kHz when the FCC assigned it to a group from Torrington. WLAD first signed on the air on October 5, 1947. At first, the station broadcast with only 250 watts of power as a daytime-only station. One of the founding members of the company, John Previdi, later served as mayor of Danbury. It was approved to increase its power to 1,000 watts by day in 1965, but it took until the 1980s for it to get nighttime authorization. Its first day as a 24-hour AM station was August 25, 1986. In 1953, the station signed on an FM sister station, WLAD-FM 98.3, which is today WDAQ.

WLAD's studios and offices were located at the Hotel Green building (renamed Ives Manor in 1975) within the Main Street Historic District in downtown Danbury from 1962 until July 2012. After moving, WLAD upgraded their equipment from analog to digital.

Harold "Hal" Brundage's local 15-minute Yankee Farmer show was aired daily in the late 1940s. In 1948, WLAD ran 10 weeks of Talent Scout Shows, a series of contests that culminated in awards being given to the best performer.

Virginia Cassidy hosted her daily local talk show The Virginia Wren Show from the 1950s through 1978. On the show, she interviewed many celebrities including actor Van Johnson, pianist Victor Borge and, in 1955, singer Marian Anderson. She also discussed books and local events on the show and had segments where she sang and played the piano. Cassidy hosted programs from the Danbury Fair every October. During the 1980s, she had a new Sunday show on which she interviewed writers of novels and plays, among other people.

Victor Gilbert also hosted a celebrity interview show on WLAD, Sunday at Stonehenge, as of 1959-1962 with interviewees including the actresses Ruth Chatterton and Judy Garland.

Abraham "Abe" Najamy worked as a news presenter and sports game announcer at the station from the 1950s through the 1970s. These included Danbury High School basketball games. He co-hosted many of the news and sports shows with Paul Baker, who was at the station from 1947 until 1977, his Saturday Sports Spotlight program became the longest-running sports show in the United States until it ended in 1987. Najamy also hosted the station's Personality Profiles interview show.

The Polish Eagles Radio Show, a weekly program of Polish language and Polish instrumental music, including polka, aired on Sundays on WLAD during the 1950s well into the 1990s. It was hosted by Connecticut bandleader Victor Zembruski (1912–1976) until he had a debilitating stroke in 1968, then taken over by his wife Sofie Zembruski (1918–2010).

The Lebanon Hour, hosted by Kamil Saffi, began its four decades of weekly shows on WLAD in 1951 filled with entertainment and information tailored to the local residents of Lebanese descent.

James Rasmussen presented 30-minute country and western music shows on Saturday afternoons as of 1962.

For much of its history, WLAD broadcast a full service middle of the road music format, playing compact discs, tape cartridges, and vinyl records. It continued to do so into the 1990s and was still seeing ratings success. In the late 1990s, WLAD shifted to its current format of full-time talk radio on weekdays.

Disc jockeys during WLAD's contemporary music era from the 1970s to the 1990s included Mike Piazza, Dan Stevens, Pete Summers, and Dave Rinelli. Some oldies music was added by 1989. Jay Fink joined WLAD in December 1988 and became the disc jockey for the Boomer Oldies Show featuring music of the 1950s through early 1970s. George Repko, who began working at WLAD in 1965, acquired the moniker "Big George" and as of 1995 served as the disc jockey of an oldies show on WLAD on Saturday mornings.

The local call-in talk show Dialogue 80 was hosted by Rhoda Daum from 1978-1988 and taken over by Summers in 1989. Summers left the station in December 2005 after 20 years on the job; Danbury's mayor at the time, Mark Boughton, dubbed Summers "the voice of Danbury". The replacement for Summers' morning show, the radio veteran and comedian Larry Caringer, began his stint in January 2006 and ended it in 2008. Rinelli, who joined WLAD in 1986, started his long-time morning talk show on May 5, 2008.

As of 1990-1991, Thom Foulks' nationally syndicated show Computing Success! was aired every Sunday on WLAD.

Dr. Dean Edell's nationally syndicated medical talk show was carried as of 2001.

For five years in the 1990s, WLAD broadcast baseball games featuring the Boston Red Sox; it switched to New York Yankees games in 1997, citing higher fan interest. They later switched back to Red Sox games. As of 2017, New York Mets games were broadcast instead. The station also broadcast Hartford Whalers hockey games, New England Patriots football games, and UConn Huskies basketball games.

Melvin "Mel" Goldstein preceded Gary Lessor as the station's weathercaster from the mid-1970s through January 13, 2012. However, Lessor also did some weather broadcasts on WLAD prior to 2012.

From 1998 until February 26, 2021, WLAD aired Rush Limbaugh's nationally syndicated talk show in the time slot from 12 p.m. to 3 p.m. after Limbaugh's death, the station replaced it with the Markley, Van Camp and Robbins Show starting on March 1, 2021. The latter show had been aired from 6 p.m. to 8 p.m. since April 2020.

WLAD began airing the nationally syndicated Glenn Beck Radio Program in 2008 and dropped it in 2012 in favor of Brian Kilmeade's show. Laura Schlessinger's syndicated talk show aired on WLAD until 2010. WLAD has also carried Lars Larson's syndicated talk show.

In the late 2010s and early 2020s, programming on Saturdays and Sundays largely consisted of oldies music shows, including American Top 40 hosted by Casey Kasem and many others, but the station dropped all of them by March 2022 in favor of talk shows about politics and news, a home improvement show, a legal advice show, and a gun talk show.

== Translator ==
Broadcast translator for WLAD
| Call sign | Frequency | City of license | FID | ERP (W) | Class | Transmitter coordinates | FCC info |
|---|---|---|---|---|---|---|---|
| W231DJ | 94.1 FM | Danbury, Connecticut | 156264 | 99 | D | 41°22′27″N 73°26′47″W | LMS |
