= WONN =

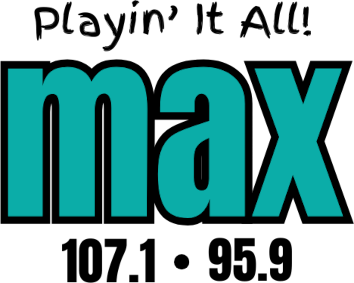
- Lakeland, Florida; United States
- Broadcast area: Lakeland; Winter Haven; Bartow
- Frequency: 1230 kHz
- Branding: MAX at 107.1 & 95.9

Programming
- Format: Adult hits
- Affiliations: Seminole Sports Network

Ownership
- Owner: MARC Media Group (MARC Radio Lakeland, LLC)
- Sister stations: WLKF; WPCV

History
- First air date: September 15, 1949

Technical information
- Licensing authority: FCC
- Facility ID: 25868
- Class: C
- Power: 1,000 watts
- Transmitter coordinates: 28°2′23.00″N 81°57′39.00″W
- Translators: 95.9 W240DB (Auburndale); 107.1 W296CS (Lakeland)

Links
- Public license information: Public file; LMS
- Webcast: Listen live
- Website: mymaxmusic.com

WONN (1230 AM) is a commercial radio station licensed to Lakeland, Florida, United States, featuring an adult hits format. Owned by MARC Media Group, WONN is also heard over two low-power FM translators: W296CS (107.1 FM) in Lakeland and W240DB (95.9 FM) in the Auburndale-Winter Haven area; the translators comprise the station's branding, "MAX at 107.1 and 95.9".

WONN's transmitter is located atop the office building where WONN has its studios and offices, on Lime Street at Sikes Boulevard in Lakeland.

== History ==
The station first signed on the air on September 15, 1949. From the late-1950s and into the mid-1970s, the station aired a Top 40 music format under the branding "The Best One", and is an original affiliate of the NBC Radio Network. In 1981, Hall Communications bought WONN, along with FM sister station WPCV in Winter Haven, for $2 million.

On August 5, 2024, WONN changed from "America's Best Music", a syndicated soft oldies and adult standards format, to sports talk. It used programming from Fox Sports Radio and the station renamed to "Fox Sports Radio Lakeland."

After The JOY FM acquired sister station WWRZ on September 27, 2025, its Adult Hits format would be moved to WONN, 107.1 W296CS, and a new translator: 95.9 W240DB. The station dropped its sports format altogether on October 1st, leaving Tampa's WDAE the only Fox Sports Radio station in the area. The first song played after its flip is "I Wanna Be Rich" by Calloway.

On February 12, 2026, a press release from MARC Radio Group announced that they would be acquiring all of Hall Communications' Florida radio stations.

== Previous logos ==
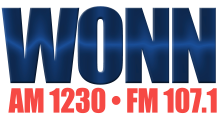
