= WMNR =

- Monroe, Connecticut; United States
- Broadcast area: Connecticut; Eastern Long Island, New York; Westchester County, New York
- Frequency: 88.1 MHz
- Branding: Fine Arts Radio

Programming
- Format: Classical music

Ownership
- Owner: Town of Monroe, Connecticut

History
- First air date: 1973; 53 years ago
- Call sign meaning: Monroe

Technical information
- Licensing authority: FCC
- Facility ID: 43531
- Class: B1
- ERP: 5,000 watts
- HAAT: 123 meters (404 ft)
- Transmitter coordinates: 41°19′8″N 73°15′13″W
- Translator: See § Translators
- Repeater: See § Repeaters

Links
- Public license information: Public file; LMS
- Webcast: Listen live
- Website: www.wmnr.org

WMNR (88.1 FM, "Fine Arts Radio") is a radio station licensed to Monroe, Connecticut. The station is municipally owned by the Town of Monroe and broadcasts mainly classical music.

== History ==
The station was founded in 1971 by John and Carol Babina. The Monroe Board of Education agreed to hold the FCC license for WMNR and provided facilities for the station at Masuk High School. The equipment was paid for with donations from individual and businesses, and the station turned into a community project. The station began broadcasting regularly in 1974 with a variety of programming, including rock, big band, and classical.

In 1980, it was thought that WMNR could fulfill a need for public radio in Fairfield county. A non-profit organization, Monroe Public Radio, Inc., began operating the station at this time. In early 1982, it became an NPR affiliate, and was able to secure a one-time federal grant for new equipment to increase power. However, before any of this could be done, Monroe Public Radio, Inc. ran out of funds and the station's operation returned to the founders, John and Carol Babina. In mid-1982, WMNR began broadcasting classical music and was run by a staff of volunteers.

As the years progressed, three other stations in Connecticut were added to simulcast WMNR. WRXC (90.1 FM) in Shelton was assigned its call letters on March 20, 1986 and began broadcasting in 1988. The following year, WGSK (90.1 FM) in South Kent received its call sign on December 14, 1987, licensed to South Kent School and was transferred to Monroe on November 13, 1990. WGRS (91.5 FM) in Guilford was assigned its call sign on May 31, 1993 and began broadcasting that same year.

By 2003, they had outgrown their allotted space at the high school and moved into rented office space. In 2009, the licenses for WMNR were transferred from the Monroe Board of Education to the Town of Monroe.

== Other stations ==
=== Repeaters ===
Call sign	Frequency	City of license	FID	Class	ERP (W)	Height (m (ft))	Transmitter coordinates
WGRS	91.5 FM	Guilford, Connecticut	43527	A	2,800	30.1 m (99 ft)	41°17′19″N 72°39′32″W
WRXC	90.1 FM	Shelton, Connecticut	43530	A	45	147 m (482 ft)	41°21′43″N 73°06′48″W
WGSK	90.1 FM	South Kent, Connecticut	61119	A	77	39 m (128 ft)	41°40′54″N 73°29′13″W
WDSK	88.3 FM	South Kent, Connecticut	768354	A	99	10 m (33 ft)	41°40′54.30″N 73°29′11.40″W

=== Translators ===
Several translators are authorized to rebroadcast these stations, including three in the state of New York.

Call sign	Frequency	City of license	State	FID	Relays
W220AC	91.9 FM	Fairfield	Connecticut	43526	WMNR
W220CF	91.9 FM	Huntington	Connecticut	90445	WRXC
W220CE	91.9 FM	Middlefield	Connecticut	90254	WGRS
W252AS	98.3 FM	New Haven	Connecticut	43528	WGRS
W233AG	94.5 FM	New London	Connecticut	79107	WGRS
W233AJ	94.5 FM	Old Saybrook	Connecticut	83375	WGRS
W287AZ	105.3 FM	Southport	Connecticut	156169	WGRS
W218AV	91.5 FM	Warren	Connecticut	77590	WMNR
W220CH	91.9 FM	West Hartford	Connecticut	90480	WGRS
W262AS	100.3 FM	Bridgehampton (Note: Eastern Long Island)	New York	156152	WMNR
W209CJ	89.7 FM	Mount Kisco (Note: Westchester County)	New York	90511	WMNR
W264AJ	100.7 FM	Southampton	New York	78762	WGRS
W282CW	104.3 FM	Water Mill	New York	83374	WGRS
