= WILI (AM) =

Radio station in Willimantic, Connecticut

- Willimantic, Connecticut; United States
- Frequency: 1400 kHz
- Branding: WILI 1400 AM and 95.3 FM

Programming
- Format: Adult contemporary; talk radio
- Affiliations: ABC News Radio; Westwood One; WVIT; Boston Red Sox Radio Network

Ownership
- Owner: Hall Communications, Inc.
- Sister stations: WILI-FM

History
- First air date: October 5, 1957
- Call sign meaning: Willimantic

Technical information
- Licensing authority: FCC
- Facility ID: 66180
- Class: C
- Power: 1,000 watts
- Transmitter coordinates: 41°42′54.36″N 72°11′21.28″W
- Translator: 95.3 W237EL (Willimantic)

Links
- Public license information: Public file; LMS
- Website: www.wili.com

WILI (1400 kHz) is an AM radio station in Willimantic, Connecticut, broadcasting at a power of 1,000 watts, full-time. WILI's programming is also heard on translator station W237EL (95.3 FM). It is affiliated with ABC News Radio, the Red Sox Radio Network, and the UConn Basketball and Football Networks. Its sister station is WILI-FM (98.3). The station is owned by Hall Communications, Inc. and its studios are located on Main Street in Willimatic, near the Willimantic Footbridge.

== Ownership ==
In May 2005, Florida-based Hall Communications reached an agreement to acquire WILI and WILI-FM from Nutmeg Broadcasting Co. At the time of the purchase, Hall already owned WICH and WCTY in Norwich and WNLC and WKNL in New London. In addition, Hall owns a number of stations in medium-sized markets along the eastern seaboard from Vermont to Florida.

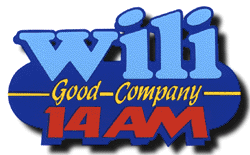
Former WILI logo used until July 2010

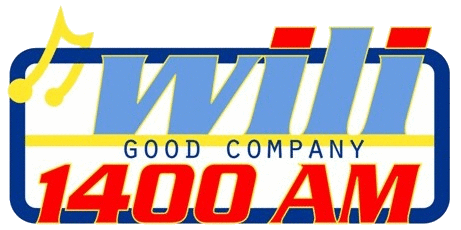
WILI logo used until July 2017

== Translators ==
Call sign	Frequency	City of license	FID	ERP (W)	HAAT	Class	Transmitter coordinates	FCC info
W237EL	95.3 FM	Willimantic, Connecticut	140714	5	77 m (253 ft)	D	41°41′0.4″N 72°12′55.3″W	LMS
