= Louis K. Roth =

Louis K. Roth was a businessman and civic leader from Connecticut.

== Biography ==
He was born in 1896 and completed his education at Columbia University and New York University. His involvement with radio and electronics began in 1924 as a distributor of radios. He joined Radio Corporation, Victor Division in 1935 as production manager of their electronic division. In 1944, he and two partners set up Radio and Appliance Distributors in Hartford, Connecticut (USA), which eventually became one of the largest radio wholesalers in the state.

Roth was involved in many civic and community organizations. In addition to being a trustee of the Connecticut Opera Association, Mr. Roth was a trustee of the Julius Hart Musical Foundation at the University of Hartford. He also served on various university committees and served on the Board of Regents of the University of Hartford from 1961 to 1967. A residence hall at the University of Hartford is named for Roth.

The Hartford Times, in a May 1967 editorial, said:

"In the brief span of 23 years Louis K. Roth made an indelible mark on the civic, cultural and business life of this community. He was a man of diverse interests, unbounded energy and willingness to give uncounted hours to non-business activities in which he had a special interest.

"The list of the social and civic agencies with which he was identified in lengthy. They range from those formed to help needy persons to societies of a musical or other artistic or cultural nature.

"Mr. Roth took his community responsibilities seriously. He was generous with his money, time and counsel whenever the call came for assistance. Hartford will recall Louis Roth with the warmest recollection as a civic-minded citizen of the highest quality."

Roth died on May 3, 1967, at the age of 71.

== Legacy to public radio ==
WWUH, the Public Alternative Radio station at the University of Hartford is dedicated as "The Louis K. Roth Memorial Station". The History page of the station's website describes the reason:

"Prior to 1968, Louis K. Roth, a generous Regent of the University, had told the President of the University of Hartford that he would finance the radio station. Mr. Roth passed away before we got things rolling, but his family still came to us with a check for $40,000. While serious consideration was given to changing the station's call letters to WLKR, we instead renamed the radio station the Lewis K. Roth Memorial radio station, and by the time I graduated in 1970, we'd built a complete stereo radio station and still had $14,000 of Mr. Roth's grant left."
