= WQGN-FM =

Coordinates: 41.385°N 72.070°W

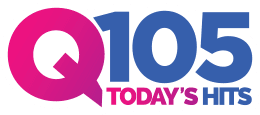
- Groton, Connecticut; United States
- Broadcast area: New London
- Frequency: 105.5 MHz
- Branding: Q105

Programming
- Format: Top 40 (CHR)
- Affiliations: Premiere Networks; Westwood One

Ownership
- Owner: Cumulus Media; (Radio License Holding CBC, LLC)
- Sister stations: WMOS; WXLM

History
- First air date: 1971
- Former call signs: WSUB-FM (1971–1979)
- Call sign meaning: Q (branding) Groton New London

Technical information
- Licensing authority: FCC
- Facility ID: 10455
- Class: A
- ERP: 3,000 watts
- HAAT: 84 meters (276 ft)

Links
- Public license information: Public file; LMS
- Webcast: Listen live
- Website: www.q105.fm

WQGN-FM (105.5 MHz "Q105") is a commercial radio station licensed to Groton, Connecticut, and serving the New London–Groton area. It broadcasts a contemporary hit radio format and is owned by Cumulus Media. WQGN carries several nationally syndicated shows including The Kidd Kraddick Morning Show and the Carson Daly Top 30. Its studios and offices are located on Wampanoag Trail in East Providence.

WQGN-FM has an effective radiated power (ERP) of 3,000 watts. The station's transmitter is on Briar Hill Road near Gungywamp Road. It shares the same tower as sister station WXLM (980 AM).

== History ==
In 1971, the station signed on as WSUB-FM. It was the FM counterpart to WSUB (980 AM, now WXLM). Both stations were owned by the Southeastern Connecticut Broadcasting Company. The "SUB" in the stations' call signs stood for "submarine", because shipbuilding is a major industry in the area.

At first, WSUB-FM simulcast the middle of the road (MOR) programming heard on the AM station. After a few years, it began playing Top 40 music separate from WSUB AM. The station started with the TM studios syndicated stereo rock format. To give it a different identity, the call sign was changed to WQGN-FM on August 6, 1979. The station became known as Q105.

In the early 2000s, WQGN and WSUB were owned by Citadel Broadcasting. Citadel merged with Cumulus Media on September 16, 2011.
