= WFIF =

- Milford, Connecticut; United States
- Broadcast area: Greater New Haven - Greater Bridgeport
- Frequency: 1500 kHz
- Branding: Life Changing Radio - WFIF

Programming
- Format: Christian talk and teaching

Ownership
- Owner: K.W. Dolmar Broadcasting Co.
- Sister stations: WSDK

History
- First air date: September 4, 1965; 60 years ago

Technical information
- Licensing authority: FCC
- Facility ID: 33246
- Class: D
- Power: 5,000 watts (daytime only)
- Transmitter coordinates: 41°11′33.35″N 73°6′3.39″W
- Translator: 101.9 W270DL (Milford)

Links
- Public license information: Public file; LMS
- Website: www.lifechangingradio.com/connecticut-wfif/

WFIF (1500 AM) is a brokered time radio station broadcasting a Christian talk and teaching radio format. Licensed to Milford, Connecticut, it serves Greater New Haven and Greater Bridgeport. The station is owned by the K.W. Dolmar Broadcasting Company, which also owns religious stations in other New England communities, including WSDK in Bloomfield, Connecticut. Programs are hosted by national religious leaders including John MacArthur, Alistair Begg, Nancy DeMoss Wolgemuth, Chuck Swindoll, Michael Youssef, June Hunt, J. Vernon McGee, David Jeremiah and Erwin Lutzer

WFIF broadcasts at 5,000 watts days only. To protect other stations on 1500 AM from interference at night, WFIF goes off the air. And for daytime protection, WFIF uses a directional antenna with a three-tower array. The transmitter and studios are on Kay Avenue in Milford, near the Housatonic River. Programming is heard around the clock on 250-watt FM translator W270DL at 101.9 MHz.

== Translators ==
Call sign	Frequency	City of license	FID	ERP (W)	HAAT	Class	Transmitter coordinates	FCC info
W270DL	101.9 FM	Milford, Connecticut	139339	250	67 m (220 ft)	D	41°20′59.3″N 72°58′21.4″W	LMS
