= WCCC (FM) =

K-Love radio station in Hartford, Connecticut

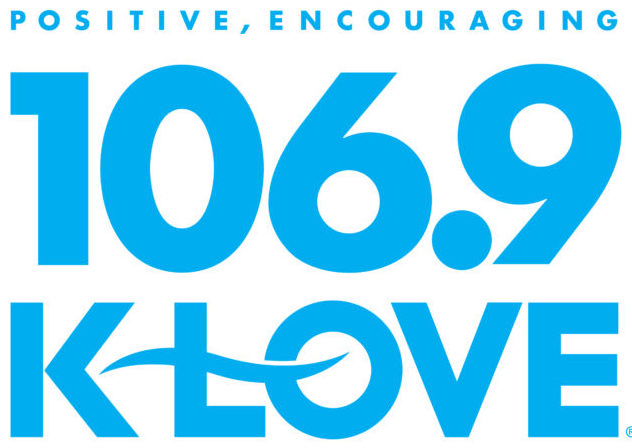
- Hartford, Connecticut; United States
- Broadcast area: Greater Hartford; Pioneer Valley; Naugatuck Valley
- Frequency: 106.9 MHz
- Branding: K-Love

Programming
- Format: Christian adult contemporary
- Network: K-Love

Ownership
- Owner: Educational Media Foundation
- Sister stations: WKNL; WKVB; WLVO

History
- First air date: June 7, 1960
- Former call signs: WCCC-FM (1960–2014)
- Call sign meaning: "We Cover Connecticut's Capital"

Technical information
- Licensing authority: FCC
- Facility ID: 25072
- Class: B
- ERP: 23,000 watts
- HAAT: 221 meters (725 ft)
- Transmitter coordinates: 41.797°N 72.797°W

Links
- Public license information: Public file; LMS
- Webcast: Listen live
- Website: www.klove.com

WCCC (106.9 FM) – branded K-Love – is a non-commercial contemporary Christian radio station licensed to serve Hartford, Connecticut. Owned by the Educational Media Foundation, WCCC does not broadcast any local programming, functioning as the K-Love network affiliate for Greater Hartford. The station's transmitter is located in Avon.

== History ==
WCCC-FM was licensed on a frequency of 106.9 MHz in 1959, and went on the air June 7, 1960. The station was owned by well-known Hartford jeweler Bill Savitt, and the studios, shared with sister station WCCC, were on the "lower street level" of the Hotel Bond on Asylum Street in Hartford, with the station's transmitter located on Avon Mountain in West Hartford. In the late 1960s, WCCC-FM moved to 11 Asylum Street, and changed to a hugely popular "All Request" format which was simulcast in part on the AM (for the next several decades, WCCC-FM simulcast their programming on the AM until that station changed to a classical music format in 2002). Also during this time, WCCC-FM was purchased by the record label Elektra, marking one of the few stations in the United States to have this distinction. Sy Dresner's Greater Hartford Communications Corp. purchased the station in the early 1970s, and during the summer of 1975, the station switched to a progressive rock music format. During the summer of 1976, the format was tweaked to a more mainstream album rock format.

WCCC-FM was the home of Howard Stern beginning in late 1979, where he hosted the station's morning show. This was Stern's first job in a large market. It was at WCCC-FM that Stern met Fred Norris, the longest-tenured member of Stern's staff, who followed Stern when he left Hartford. Beginning in May 1996, Stern's syndicated morning show aired every weekday morning on WCCC until he departed for Sirius Satellite Radio in December 2005. (WCCC-FM replaced Stern with Sebastian, who had worked for the station in the mid-1990s until moving to WZMX in February 1995; Sebastian left the station again at the end of August 2009). In contrast to most rock stations, WCCC also served as the market's home for Paul Harvey's News and Comment and The Rest of the Story for two decades.

In 1980, the station was moved to 243 South Whitney Street in Hartford. In 1998, Marlin Broadcasting purchased the station from Greater Hartford Communications Corporation and moved the station to 1039 Asylum Avenue; around this time, WCCC-FM evolved to an active rock format. Because their building is made of brick (and due to the name of the street on which they were located), it is often referred to by staff as "The Asylum". The building used to be occupied by Hartford station WHCN. Former program director Mike Picozzi worked for WHCN when it was located on Asylum Avenue.

In 2000, a $1,000,000 renovation was undertaken at the station's tower site with a new tower, new antenna and a new building were installed. This resulted in improved coverage for the station's 23,000 watt FM signal.

In a humorous response to WHCN's switch to "The River 105.9", WCCC-FM briefly became "The Lake 106.9" on April 1, 2002, playing soft rock music.

In 2004, WCCC-FM started streaming its programming full-time via the internet. In April 2005, WCCC-FM became one of the first stations in the state to commence broadcasting on HD Radio. In April 2007, it added an HD2 channel which featured WCCC's classical music format.

In March 2013, WCCC-FM shifted its format from active rock to classic rock. The change in format resulted in controversy and backlash from both fans and airstaff. When asked about the change, program director Mike Picozzi responded, "Why not?" On April 2, 2013, Piccozzi left WCCC-FM.

On July 30, 2014, Marlin announced that they would be selling both WCCC-FM and WCCC (AM) to EMF Broadcasting, which would result in the discontinuation of the rock format after 39 years and flipping the stations to the nationwide K-Love network, which airs contemporary Christian music. Program director Mike Karolyi hosted a five-hour goodbye show on August 1, with most of its current and former DJs, guests, and bands inspired by WCCC-FM coming by the studio or calling in, including Howard Stern talking about his time on WCCC-FM. At 5:00 pm, WCCC-FM signed off with "Walk" by Pantera, followed by a period of dead air. Soon after, WCCC and WCCC-FM joined K-Love.

On June 2, 2016, the station dropped the "-FM" suffix from its call sign after their AM sister station was sold and became WNWW.
