= WICH =

- Norwich, Connecticut; United States
- Broadcast area: New London County
- Frequency: 1310 kHz
- Branding: WICH 94.5 FM and 1310 AM Personality Radio

Programming
- Format: adult standards; soft oldies; talk radio
- Affiliations: America's Best Music; Fox News Radio; Westwood One

Ownership
- Owner: Bonnie Rowbotham; (Hall Communications, Inc.)
- Sister stations: WCTY; WILI; WILI-FM; WNLC

History
- First air date: September 1946
- Former call signs: WNOC (1946–1949)
- Call sign meaning: Named after its city of license: Norwich

Technical information
- Licensing authority: FCC
- Facility ID: 72347
- Class: B
- Power: 5,000 watts
- Transmitter coordinates: 41°33′10.4″N 72°4′32.3″W
- Translator: 94.5 W233DB (Norwich)

Links
- Public license information: Public file; LMS
- Website: www.wich.com

WICH (1310 AM, "Personality Radio") is a commercial radio station licensed to Norwich, Connecticut, and serving New London County. It is owned by Bonnie Rowbotham with the license held by Hall Communications, Inc. The station's studios and offices are located on Cuprak Road in Norwich. WICH airs a mix of soft oldies, adult standards and talk radio. It airs the syndicated "America's Best Music" radio format nights and weekends, with local DJs on weekday mornings and the talk show Fox Across America with Jimmy Failla on weekday afternoons.

WICH is powered at 5,000 watts, to avoid interfering with other stations on 1310 AM,it uses a directional antenna with a three-tower array. The station's transmitter is located on Tower Hill Road in Norwich. Programming is also heard on FM translator W233DB at 94.5 MHz.

== History ==
John Deme was the founder and original owner of the station. It went on the air with 250 watts in September 1946. Its original call sign was WNOC and it broadcast on 1400 kilocycles. The station's studios were located at 91 Main Street.

It changed its call sign to WICH on May 27, 1949. It moved to 1310 kHz with 1,000 watts in 1955, and upgraded to 5,000 watts in 1961. In 2020, Hall Communications cut two newscasters and a DJ from WICH due to economic problems caused by the COVID-19 pandemic.
