= WCTY =

Country music radio station in Norwich–New London, Connecticut

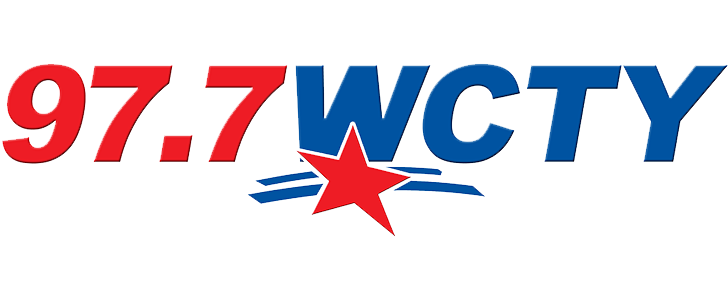
- Norwich, Connecticut; United States
- Broadcast area: Groton–New London, Connecticut
- Frequency: 97.7 MHz
- Branding: 97.7 WCTY

Programming
- Format: Country music

Ownership
- Owner: Bonnie Rowbotham; (Hall Communications, Inc.)
- Sister stations: WICH, WILI, WILI-FM, WNLC

History
- First air date: May 1968; 58 years ago
- Former call signs: WICH-FM (1966–1975)
- Call sign meaning: "Country"

Technical information
- Licensing authority: FCC
- Facility ID: 72346
- Class: A
- ERP: 1,900 watts
- HAAT: 125 meters (410 ft)
- Transmitter coordinates: 41.475°N 72.103°W

Links
- Public license information: Public file; LMS
- Webcast: Listen live
- Website: www.wcty.com

WCTY (97.7 FM) is a radio station with studios in Norwich, Connecticut. Its transmitter is located on Cook Drive in Montville, Connecticut. WCTY broadcasts a country music format, and is owned by Bonnie Rowbotham, through licensee Hall Communications, Inc.
