= WPCV =

- Winter Haven, Florida; United States
- Broadcast area: Central Florida (Lakeland; Orlando)
- Frequency: 97.5 MHz
- Branding: 97.5 WPCV

Programming
- Format: Country

Ownership
- Owner: MARC Media Group (MARC Radio Lakeland, LLC)
- Sister stations: WLKF; WONN

History
- First air date: February 7, 1963 (as WINT-FM)
- Former call signs: WINT-FM (1963–1967); WXKL (1967–1972); WHFL (1972–1975)
- Call sign meaning: "Polk County's Voice"

Technical information
- Licensing authority: FCC
- Facility ID: 25872
- Class: C0
- ERP: 100,000 watts
- HAAT: 310 meters (1,020 ft)
- Transmitter coordinates: 28°7′36.1″N 81°33′2.3″W

Links
- Public license information: Public file; LMS
- Webcast: Listen live
- Website: www.97country.com

WPCV (97.5 MHz) is a commercial FM radio station, licensed to Winter Haven and serving Central Florida. It has a country music radio format and is owned and operated by MARC Media Group. The studios and offices are in Lakeland.

While the station predominantly covers Polk County, WPCV‘s signal also blankets the Greater Orlando area (where it competes with WWKA) and can be heard clearly in the eastern part of the Tampa Bay area and south to Sebring. with its transmitter on Cypress Parkway in Haines City. It has an effective radiated power (ERP) of 100,000 watts, the maximum for non-grandfathered FM stations. The tower has a height above average terrain (HAAT) of 310 meters (1,020 ft), making WPCV one of few radio stations in Central Florida to reach both Atlantic and Gulf coasts.

== History ==
On February 7, 1963, the station signed on the air as WINT-FM, the FM sister station of WINT (1360 AM). In 1967, the station became WXKL, with a beautiful music format. It played quarter hour sweeps of mostly instrumental cover versions of popular songs, with some Hollywood and Broadway show tunes. In 1972, the call letters switched to WHFL.

In 1975, the station flipped to country music. To go along with the new format, it switched to its current call sign, WPCV, which stands for "Polk County's Voice".

On February 12, 2026, a press release from MARC Radio Group announced that they would be acquiring all of Hall Communications' Florida radio stations.
