= WSGG =

WSGG and WKGG
WSGG: Norfolk, Connecticut; WKGG: Bolton, Connecticut
- Frequencies: WSGG: 89.3 MHz; WKGG: 90.9 MHz
- Branding: Radio Avivamiento

Programming
- Language(s): Spanish
- Format: Contemporary Christian

Ownership
- Owner: Revival Christian Ministries, Inc.

History
- First air date: WSGG: 2001; WKGG: 2023

Technical information
- Licensing authority: FCC
- Facility ID: WSGG: 92857; WKGG: 767765
- Class: WSGG: A; WKGG: A
- ERP: WSGG: 235 watts; WKGG: 52
- HAAT: WSGG: −14 meters (−46 ft); WKGG: 141 meters (463 ft)
- Transmitter coordinates: WSGG: 42°0′39.9″N 73°12′12.9″W; WKGG: 41°48′9.2″N 72°26′28.3″W

Links
- Public license information: WSGG: Public file; LMS; WKGG: Public file; LMS
- Webcast: Listen live
- Website: radioavivamiento.com

WSGG (89.3 FM, "Radio Avivamiento") is a radio station licensed to serve Norfolk, Connecticut. The station is owned by Revival Christian Ministries, Inc. It airs a Spanish language contemporary Christian music format. Its programming is also heard on WKGG (90.9 FM) in Bolton and W261BU (100.1 FM) in Talcottville.

The station was assigned the callsign WSGG by the Federal Communications Commission on May 17, 2001.

== Translators ==
Broadcast translator for WKGG
Call sign	Frequency	City of license	FID	ERP (W)	HAAT	Class	Transmitter coordinates	FCC info
W261BU	100.1 FM	Talcottville, Connecticut	92957	99	−5 m (−16 ft)	D	41°45′33.42″N 72°42′11.99″W	LMS
