= WDAQ =

Radio station in Danbury, Connecticut

- Danbury, Connecticut; United States
- Broadcast area: Western Connecticut and Putnam County, New York
- Frequency: 98.3 MHz (HD Radio)
- Branding: 98Q

Programming
- Format: Hot adult contemporary
- Subchannels: HD2: 94.5 The Hawk (classic hits); HD3: 97.9/107.3 The Bull (country); HD4: Simulcast of WNPR (public radio)
- Affiliations: Premiere Networks

Ownership
- Owner: Berkshire Broadcasting Group; (The Berkshire Broadcasting Corp.)
- Sister stations: WAXB; WLAD

History
- First air date: 1953 (as WLAD-FM)
- Former call signs: WLAD-FM (1953–1979)
- Call sign meaning: Danbury Q

Technical information
- Licensing authority: FCC
- Facility ID: 4822
- Class: A
- ERP: 1,300 watts
- HAAT: 140 meters (460 ft)
- Transmitter coordinates: 41.374°N 73.446°W
- Translator: See § Translators

Links
- Public license information: Public file; LMS
- Webcast: Listen live; HD2: Listen live; HD3: Listen live
- Website: www.98q.com; HD2: thehawkct.com; HD3: thebullct.com

WDAQ (98.3 FM, "98Q") is a radio station licensed to Danbury, Connecticut, and serving part of Western Connecticut and Putnam County, New York, with a hot adult contemporary format. The station is owned by The Berkshire Broadcasting Corporation, along with sister stations WLAD and WAXB. The studios and offices are located on Mill Plain Road in Danbury.

WDAQ has an effective radiated power (ERP) of 1,300 watts. The transmitter is located on Brushy Hill Road, also in Danbury. It broadcasts using HD Radio technology. WDAQ has four digital subchannels, three of them feeding FM translators with formats including classic hits (94.5), country music (97.9/107.3) and public radio (103.7).

== History ==
=== Rural Radio Network ===
In 1953, the station first signed on as WLAD-FM. Then, as now, it was owned by Berkshire Broadcasting as the FM sister station of WLAD (800 AM); the studios at the time were located at 307 Main Street. WLAD-FM was one of the first Class A FM stations in the United States, designed to have only a regional signal. It was also the first FM station to sign on in the Danbury area, four years prior to the start of WINE-FM (now WRKI).

Originally, WLAD-FM was part of the Rural Radio Network as one of two Connecticut affiliates of the New York-based chain. Several years later, WLAD-FM evolved into an extension of its then daytime-only sister station, WLAD. When the AM facility had to go off the air at sunset, WLAD-FM continued its programming into the evening.

=== Beautiful music ===
In the mid-1960s, the Federal Communications Commission began encouraging AM-FM combos to end full time simulcasting. WLAD-FM upgraded to an FM stereo signal and flipped to a beautiful music format, which was automated in 1975. WLAD-FM played quarter hour sweeps of mostly instrumental cover versions of popular songs as well as Broadway and Hollywood show tunes.

In 1979, the call sign was changed to WDAQ, to create a separate identity from WLAD. WDAQ was competing with WEZN from Bridgeport, Connecticut, and WHUD from Peekskill, New York, for Greater Danbury's easy listening audience.

=== Adult contemporary ===
By the early 1980s, the audience for the easy listening format was aging, with most advertisers then seeking youthful and middle aged consumers. WDAQ added more soft vocals and reduced the instrumentals to appeal to a more youthful audience. By the mid-1980s, WDAQ completed the shift to soft adult contemporary, rebranded as "Lite 98".

By the late 1980s, WDAQ faced a more crowded market of adult contemporary signals. WEBE in Westport, Connecticut adopted the AC format in 1984 and then WEZN contemporized its easy listening format in 1987. Seeing an opportunity between teen formatted WKCI-FM, mainstream AC WEBE and soft AC WEZN, WDAQ was reborn as hot adult contemporary "98Q" in September 1989. The station's initial music mix relied heavily on 1970s titles that had not been played on the radio for several years. Within a year, WDAQ shot to #1 beating co-owned full-service WLAD and crosstown rocker WRKI.

During its run as "98Q", the station has finished first in virtually every Danbury Arbitron/Nielsen Audio ratings survey. The station continues its hyper-focus on Greater Danbury as opposed to the more regional approaches of the other FM stations in the area.

=== HD Radio ===
On August 7, 2015, WDAQ upgraded to HD Radio, and launched a new alternative station on 103.7 MHz, fed by its HD2 subchannel, as "103.7 Danbury's New Rock Alternative", which launched on August 10 at 12 p.m. after stunting with loops of songs that changed each hour, with songs like "Rapper's Delight" by The Sugarhill Gang and "Drunk on a Plane" by Dierks Bentley. The first song on 103.7 was "Renegades" by X Ambassadors. It was announced on-air that 103.7 Rock will cease broadcasting at the end of 2023.

In July 2016, Berkshire launched a new country music station on 107.3 MHz, fed by its HD3 subchannel, as "107.3 The Bull".

On February 22, 2017, 97.9 MHz W250CH New Milford started simulcasting "The Bull" and the station would rebrand to "97.9/107.3 The Bull".

On December 17, 2020, "94.5 The Hawk" was moved from WAXB to WDAQ-HD4, and continued to simulcast on 94.5 W233CF. It changed its format to classic hits on March 21, 2022, while keeping The Hawk branding.

As of late December 2023, 103.7 is rebroadcasting Connecticut Public Radio with The Hawk moving from WDAQ HD-4 to HD-2.

== Translators ==
| Call sign | Frequency | City of license | FID | FCC info | Notes |
|---|---|---|---|---|---|
| W233CF | 94.5 FM | Danbury, Connecticut | 156274 | LMS | Relays WDAQ-HD2 |
| W279CI | 103.7 FM | Danbury, Connecticut | 153813 | LMS | Relays WDAQ-HD4 (WNPR) |
| W297AN | 107.3 FM | Danbury, Connecticut | 156167 | LMS | Relays WDAQ-HD3 |
| W250CH | 97.9 FM | New Milford, Connecticut | 147329 | LMS | Relays WDAQ-HD3 |
