= WLIS =

Simulcast with WMRD, Middletown
- Old Saybrook, Connecticut; United States
- Broadcast area: Southeastern Connecticut
- Frequency: 1420 kHz

Programming
- Language: English
- Format: talk radio; adult standards

Ownership
- Owner: Crossroads Communications of Old Saybrook, LLC
- Sister stations: WMRD

History
- First air date: 1957
- Call sign meaning: Long Island Sound

Technical information
- Licensing authority: FCC
- Facility ID: 16418
- Class: B
- Power: 5,000 watts (day); 500 watts (night)
- Transmitter coordinates: 41°19′38.35″N 72°23′19.31″W
- Translator: (97.3 MHz) W247DE (Old Saybrook)
- Repeater: 1150 WMRD (Middletown)

Links
- Public license information: Public file; LMS
- Webcast: Listen live
- Website: wliswmrd.net

WLIS (1420 AM) is a radio station licensed to serve Old Saybrook, Connecticut. The station is owned by Crossroads Communications of Old Saybrook, LLC. and airs a talk radio–adult standards format. The station is also simulcast on WMRD in Middletown, Connecticut.

The station has held the call letters WLIS since it was initially licensed.

== Translator ==
Call sign	Frequency	City of license	FID	ERP (W)	Class	Transmitter coordinates	FCC info
W247DE	97.3 FM	Old Saybrook, Connecticut	202185	250	D	41°19′39″N 72°23′18″W	LMS
