= WKND =

Currently silent
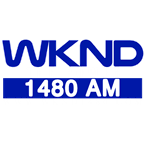
- Windsor, Connecticut; United States
- Broadcast area: Greater Hartford
- Frequency: 1480 kHz
- Branding: WKND 1480 AM 97.5 FM

Programming
- Format: Urban adult contemporary

Ownership
- Owner: Parthenon Holdings, LLC

History
- First air date: March 4, 1961
- Last air date: (silent) 2026
- Former call signs: WSOR (1961–1966); WEHW (1966–1969); WKND (1969–2004); WNEZ (2004–2007)
- Call sign meaning: KND Corporation (former owner Kenneth Dawson)

Technical information
- Licensing authority: FCC
- Facility ID: 26302
- Class: D
- Power: 500 watts (day); 14 watts (night)
- Transmitter coordinates: 41°51′10.36″N 72°40′41.33″W

Links
- Public license information: Public file; LMS
- Webcast: Listen live
- Website: www.radio.net/s/wknd-1480

WKND (1480 kHz) is a commercial AM radio station licensed to serve the city of Windsor, Connecticut, owned by Gois Broadcasting of Connecticut, LLC. Before going silent in 2026, WKND last aired an urban adult contemporary format. Its transmitter site and studios are in Windsor.

By day, WKND is powered by 500 watts; it reduces power to 14 watts at night to avoid interference with other stations on 1480 AM.

== History ==
WKND signed on in 1961, as WSOR, and featured a country music and Polish format. It was a 500-watt daytime-only station. After a couple sales of the station in the mid-1960s, WSOR became WEHW in 1966.

In 1969, The KND Corporation purchased the station, and changed the callsign to WKND. A format change to R&B soon followed, and WKND became the first radio station in the state to feature a format targeting the African American community. In 1981, Hartcom Inc. purchased the station. Hartcom was formed by an all-minority group of individuals committed to keeping the station serving the African-American community. Studios eventually moved to the Windsor Parkade Shopping Center. Major transmitter site renovations were undertaken in the mid-1990s, with the replacement of the station's three towers and a retuning of the station's directional antenna pattern.

In 2004, under a local marketing agreement with Freedom Communications of Connecticut, WKND's call sign and format moved to Freedom's WNEZ (1230 AM). With the move to 1230, WKND became a 24-hour station for the first time and got a power boost to 1,000 watts. They ran on-air announcements "The all-new 24 Hour, Twice the Power WKND 1230 AM". The 1480 facility then took the WNEZ call letters from 1230 AM and became urban gospel-formatted "Heaven 1480" for a few months, and then became Spanish oldies "La X 1480". WNEZ soon joined its sister stations WLAT and WKND at 330 Main Street in Hartford.

Freedom Communications ended up in receivership, and in 2007, WKND and its R&B oldies format returned to 1480, with 1230 going back to WNEZ and a Spanish-language format. Gois Broadcasting acquired WLAT and WNEZ in 2008, and WKND in 2009. The three stations were moved into new studios on Burnside Avenue in East Hartford shortly thereafter.

In 2016, Gois Broadcasting acquired a group of FM translators from the Northeast Gospel Network for $390,000; among them was W254AM (98.7 FM) in Berlin, New York, which would move to 97.5 MHz in Windsor as W248CR. W248CR would be sold to Conduit Communications, with the intention of using it as a translator of WLCQ-LP from Feeding Hills, Massachusetts, for $275,000 in late 2025. In March 2026, Gois took WKND silent after it lost its transmitter site; that June, it sold the WKND license to David Webster's Parthenon Holdings for $15,000. The deal completed Gois' exit from Connecticut, and added the station to a group of Webster-owned stations that already includes the Viva Radio network based at WRYM in New Britain, and a 50% stake in WATR in Waterbury.
