= WDJW =

- Somers, Connecticut; United States
- Frequency: 89.7 MHz

Programming
- Format: High school radio

Ownership
- Owner: WDJW-Somers High School

Technical information
- Licensing authority: FCC
- Facility ID: 71340
- Class: D
- ERP: 9 watts
- HAAT: -18 meters
- Transmitter coordinates: 41°57′43″N 72°27′49″W

Links
- Public license information: Public file; LMS

WDJW is the call sign of the FM radio station licensed to the Somers, Connecticut Board of Education. One of only a handful of high school radio stations in the state, WDJW has served the school and the community for over 35 years. Originally operating on 105.3 MHz, WDJW moved to 89.7 in the early 1990s and has had an eclectic format consisting of student and faculty programs supplemented with the programming of WWUH from the University of Hartford.

== History ==
WDJW was founded in 1979 by Somers High School sophomore Robert Child. Child approached the Somers Board of Education in early 1979 to request funding and approval and was granted sufficient funds to purchase and install the requisite equipment. The radio station was installed in a small utility room at Somers High School, and was staffed by volunteer students under the direction of Radio Station Club faculty adviser Otto Bouldwin. Child went on to a distinguished career in film and television, and is an Emmy nominated writer and director.

In 1979, representatives of the station requested and received authorization from WTIC-AM to simulcast Boston Red Sox games to the Somers community. Formal ratings data was not available during the station launch era, but the complete listening audience was better understood when in 1980 Somers High School Administration received a petition from inmates at the Somers Maximum Security Correctional Facility to support WDJW radio. The petition was signed by hundreds of prison inmates, who apparently followed and appreciated the efforts of the volunteer student 'disc jockeys'.

The earliest Federal Communications Commission (FCC) document available on line is an "original construction permit" which was granted on June 25, 1979, authorizing construction of a station on 89.7 MHz with 10 watts of power. A License to Cover was granted on March 14, 1980. A "Major Modification" was granted by the FCC on February 28, 1983, but the on line data base does not specify any details. On December 12, 1990, a Construction Permit was granted to change the frequency to 105.3 MHz. Reportedly the Board of Education decided not to pursue this change and the next FCC database entry is a renewal on June 10, 1999, showing the frequency as 89.7 MHz.

In late 1995 WDJW's old transmitter failed for good and the station went off the air. WDJW was faced with deletion since a recent FCC rule change called for automatic deletion of any license that was off the air for one year. WWUH at the University of Hartford offered the BOE a loan of a transmitter in return for use of the WDJW signal when local programming was unavailable. WDJW went back on the air in late 1996 and moved its studios and transmitter to the new high school building in the late 1990s.

WDJW has a construction permit from the FCC to add circular polarization and correct antenna coordinates. It is licensed for 9 watts effective radiated power and the antenna is -18 meters height above average terrain.
