= WMRD =

Radio station in Middletown, Connecticut

Simulcast with WLIS, Old Saybrook
- Middletown, Connecticut; United States
- Broadcast area: Greater Hartford; North Fork (Long Island)
- Frequency: 1150 kHz

Programming
- Language: English
- Format: talk radio; adult standards

Ownership
- Owner: Crossroads Communications, LLC
- Sister stations: WLIS

History
- First air date: December 12, 1948
- Former call signs: WCNX (1948–1996)
- Call sign meaning: "Middletown Radio"

Technical information
- Licensing authority: FCC
- Facility ID: 54678
- Class: D
- Power: 2,500 watts (day); 46 watts (night)
- Transmitter coordinates: 41°33′26.36″N 72°37′11.33″W
- Translator: (103.7 MHz) W279EK (Middletown)

Links
- Public license information: Public file; LMS
- Webcast: Listen live
- Website: wliswmrd.net

WMRD (1150 AM) is a radio station licensed to serve Middletown, Connecticut. The station is owned by Crossroads Communications, LLC, and airs a talk radio and adult standards radio format, simulcast with WLIS in Old Saybrook.

== History ==
=== WCNX ===
On August 4, 1948, the Middletown Broadcasting Company received a construction permit from the Federal Communications Commission (FCC) to build a new 500-watt daytime-only station in Middletown. Broadcasting began December 12, 1948. Originally established as a partnership between the O'Brien brothers and Elmer Hubbell, publisher of The Middletown Press newspaper, William J. and Richard O'Brien became sole owners in 1953; William later became the first Democratic speaker of the Connecticut House of Representatives in 82 years and also served on the state Liquor Control Commission. In 1964, after four years pending at the FCC, an application was approved to upgrade the station from 500 to 1,000 watts.

WCNX was sold in 1976 from the O'Brien brothers to David E. Parnigoni, who owned a station in Brattleboro, Vermont. In September 1980, Parnigoni sold WCNX to Radio Middletown, Inc., a subsidiary of the Berkshire Broadcasting Company of Massachusetts; the next year, the new ownership shifted the station from adult contemporary music to an oldies format syndicated by TM Programming, retaining the local air staff. In addition to its music, WCNX also began airing weekly programming in Italian; in 1981, Middletown's two candidates for mayor—both of them of partial or full Italian heritage—agreed to be interviewed in Italian on the program.

Radio Middletown sold WCNX to Jan Peek Communications in 1984; the group included former general manager Edward Creem. Citing competition from FM music stations, WCNX dropped its music programming and changed to an all-talk format in 1990. The next year, former owners Radio Middletown sued Jan Peek for money owed on the $405,000 promissory note that had been used to acquire the station seven years prior. Jan Peek responded that, prior to the sale, Radio Middletown had overstated the station's profit-making potential and misrepresented its reasons for selling. In 1993, a judge ruled in favor of the former owners; Jan Peek then announced it could not meet a deadline to pay $275,000 or lose WCNX.

On December 5, 1993, Jan Peek ceased operating the station; Radio Middletown had reached a deal with Instant Traffic, Inc., a North Haven-based provider of traffic information to radio stations, and the station continued broadcasting its existing talk programming after a day of silence until Instant Traffic was ready to take over operations the next week. Advertising revenues were low enough at WCNX that Instant Traffic backed out of a planned purchase of the station, and Radio Middletown temporarily took over operations and reinstated the old format in October 1994, dropping the format of traffic information every 5 minutes.

A new buyer stepped up: Sonny Bloch, a financial talk show host who also ran the Independent Broadcasters Network (formerly known as Sun Radio Network) of Clearwater, Florida, which had supplied WCNX's national talk programs from 1990 to 1993 and again after Instant Traffic ceased operating the station. Even while the station sale awaited federal approval, Bloch began leasing WCNX and started construction on improvements to its studios; plans included a national studio to allow programs from Middletown to be syndicated nationally. By January 1995, Bloch estimated that he had invested $500,000 in the WCNX physical plant, including a new tower and a new roof. However, his financial dealings soon came under heavy scrutiny. In May 1995, federal authorities unsealed a 35-count indictment against Bloch and an arrest warrant for defrauding investors, including by selling "memberships" in WCNX. After Bloch was arrested, a court appointed Michael Eskridge, the founder of CNBC and a former NBC radio executive, as a receiver to manage the station's affairs, while Sonny's son Paul and the president of Independent Broadcasters formed a group that sought to acquire WCNX itself.

=== WMRD ===
Radio Middletown's fourth attempt at selling WCNX since 1984 would be successful. In 1996, Donald DeCesare, an executive at CBS News, announced his plans to purchase WCNX through Crossroads Communications and restore local news and sports coverage for the Middletown area that had suffered amidst the parade of owners and operators. The purchase closed in April, and WCNX became WMRD (for "Middletown Radio").

WMRD would not be alone for long. WLIS in Old Saybrook, the only other commercial radio station in Middlesex County, was sold to Crossroads Communications later that year, forming a regional simulcast that strengthened both stations.

A longtime fixture of WCNX and WMRD, Ed Henry's Sunday polka show, began in 1950 and remained on the air for 65 years until Henry died in 2015.

== Translator ==
Call sign	Frequency	City of license	FID	ERP (W)	Class	Transmitter coordinates	FCC info
W279EK	103.7 FM	Middletown, Connecticut	201173	250	D	41°30′49.6″N 72°44′45.2″W	LMS
