= WKNL =

- New London, Connecticut; United States
- Broadcast area: Southeastern Connecticut
- Frequency: 100.9 MHz
- Branding: K-Love

Programming
- Language: English
- Format: Christian adult contemporary
- Network: K-Love

Ownership
- Owner: Educational Media Foundation
- Sister stations: WCCC; WLVO

History
- First air date: December 29, 1969
- Former call signs: WTYD (1970–2000)
- Call sign meaning: "Kool New London" (former branding)

Technical information
- Licensing authority: FCC
- Facility ID: 48547
- Class: A
- ERP: 6,000 watts
- HAAT: 99 meters (325 ft)
- Transmitter coordinates: 41°26′27.3″N 72°8′27.2″W

Links
- Public license information: Public file; LMS
- Website: www.klove.com

WKNL (100.9 FM) – branded K-Love – is a non-commercial contemporary Christian radio station licensed to serve New London, Connecticut. The station is owned by the Educational Media Foundation, and does not broadcast any local programming, functioning as the K-Love network affiliate for Southeastern Connecticut.

== History ==
WKNL signed on December 29, 1969, as WTYD, a beautiful music station branded as "Tide 101". At the outset, the station was owned by Thames Broadcasting Corporation, which also owned WNLC (1510 AM). Thames Broadcasting sold the stations to Mercury Broadcasting Corporation in 1976; in 1984, Mercury sold them to Drubner Broadcasting, which then sold WTYD and WNLC to Andross Communications in 1989. In 1990, WTYD shifted to an adult contemporary format.

Hall Communications purchased WTYD and WNLC in 1995. On March 10, 2000, Hall changed the station's format to oldies as "Kool 101", in response to WVVE (102.3 FM, now WMOS) dropping the format in December 1999; the WKNL call letters had been assigned on February 25, 2000.

The oldies format (which subsequently shifted to classic hits) was dropped at midnight on December 17, 2012, when, following a half-hour of departure-themed songs (ending with "Last Dance" by Donna Summer), WKNL shifted to hot adult contemporary, branded as "100.9 Roxy FM"; at the time, sister station WNLC (98.7 FM) also programmed a classic hits format. The first song on "100.9 Roxy FM" was "Some Nights" by Fun.

On March 1, 2017, at 5:00 p.m., WKNL flipped back to classic hits, branded as "100.9 K-Hits". The airstaff from Roxy remained on the station with the change. On December 20, 2024, WKNL rebranded as "Big 100.9".

On April 30, 2026, Hall Communications announced it would sell WKNL to K-Love, Inc. for $481,000. The sale was consummated on July 24, 2026.
