= WAXB =

Radio station in Ridgefield, Connecticut

- Ridgefield, Connecticut; United States
- Broadcast area: Greater Danbury
- Frequency: 850 kHz
- Branding: 85X XPerimental Radio

Programming
- Language: English
- Format: free-form radio (stunting)

Ownership
- Owner: The Berkshire Broadcasting Corp.; (sale to Hudson Valley Public Radio pending)
- Operator: Hudson Valley Public Radio
- Sister stations: WDAQ; WLAD

History
- First air date: March 15, 1985
- Former call signs: WVFR (1977–1985); WREE (1985); WREF (1985–2011)

Technical information
- Licensing authority: FCC
- Facility ID: 66327
- Class: D
- Power: 2,500 watts (daytime only)
- Transmitter coordinates: 41°17′27.3″N 73°29′14.4″W

Links
- Public license information: Public file; LMS
- Website: waxb.org

WAXB (850 AM) is a radio station licensed to serve Ridgefield, Connecticut. It is one of three area stations owned by the Berkshire Broadcasting Corporation, along with WDAQ and WLAD. WAXB covers the Greater Danbury area, and airs a free-form radio format.

Because 850 AM is a clear channel frequency reserved for KOA in Denver, Colorado, and KICY in Nome, Alaska, WAXB must sign-off at night to avoid interference with those stations.

== History ==
The Federal Communications Commission assigned the call letters WREF to the frequency on January 18, 1984. WREF began broadcasting on March 15, 1985, nearly a decade after getting the original construction permit, programming an adult standards format from sign-on through its sale to the Berkshire Broadcasting Corporation in 1996, when the new owners switched the format to oldies.

In late March 2004, WREF became the first station to air Scott Shannon's "True Oldies Channel". After a period of tweaking on WREF, Shannon put the format into nationwide radio syndication in July 2004.

On February 1, 2011, WREF rebranded as "B107.3", adopted the call letters WAXB and began a simulcast of the 850 AM signal on FM translator W297AN (107.3 FM licensed to Danbury). The WAXB calls had previously been in the market at 105.5 FM before Cumulus Media abandoned the oldies format on that frequency in 2002 (which is now WDBY, a country music station). B107.3 switched to a locally programmed classic hits format, featuring pop and rock hits of the 1970s and 1980s, on January 31, 2013.

On July 1, 2016, WAXB rebranded as "B94.5", switching translators to W233CF 94.5 FM.

On February 26, 2020, at 3 pm, WAXB changed its format from classic hits to classic rock, branded as "94.5 The Hawk".

On December 17, 2020, WAXB changed format to Spanish-language adult hits "Juan 850". "The Hawk" moved to WDAQ-HD4 and continued to be relayed by W233CF.

WAXB went silent in December 2024 due to transmitter issues. In December 2025, Berkshire Broadcasting agreed to donate the WAXB license to Hudson Valley Public Radio, owner of WJZZ and a nonprofit affiliate of the Neversink Media group; shortly beforehand, it returned to the air as a simulcast of WLAD.

In January 2026, the station silently flipped to a stunt format deemed "XPerimental Radio 85X", a freeform format that consists primarily of yacht rock, albeit with other songs from outside of the category (including smooth jazz, disco, and J-pop) included on occasion. The format is presented as if the station had been hijacked by aliens, proclaiming itself as "real radio for real ETs", and "the station that broadcasts across the galaxy, mostly because our antenna is badly aimed" (in reference to its directional antenna). The stunt quickly garnered online attention for its peculiarity, with new owner Bud Williamson admitting in an interview with news outlet RadioInsight that he was considering keeping the format around in some form after the official launch due to the local attention garnered.
