= WLKF =

- Lakeland, Florida; United States
- Broadcast area: Central Florida and Winter Haven
- Frequency: 1430 kHz
- Branding: Talk Radio 96.7

Programming
- Format: Talk radio
- Affiliations: Fox News Radio

Ownership
- Owner: MARC Media Group (MARC Radio Lakeland, LLC)
- Sister stations: WONN; WPCV

History
- First air date: May 15, 1936
- Call sign meaning: Lakeland Florida

Technical information
- Licensing authority: FCC
- Facility ID: 10341
- Class: B
- Power: 5,000 watts (day); 1,000 watts (night)
- Transmitter coordinates: 28°2′27.00″N 81°56′8.00″W
- Translator: 96.7 W244BJ (Lakeland)

Links
- Public license information: Public file; LMS
- Website: www.wlkf.com

WLKF (1430 AM, "Talk Radio 96.7") is a commercial radio station licensed to Lakeland, Florida, United States, serving Central Florida. It carries a talk radio format and is owned by MARC Media Group.

Programming is also heard on FM translator W244BJ at 96.7 MHz in Lakeland.

== History ==
On May 15, 1936, the station first signed on as WLAK. It was an NBC Red Network affiliate. It stayed with NBC throughout the 1960s. The call letters were changed to WQPD on December 1, 1971.

In the early 1980s, another call letter change took place, switching to the current WLKF. The station began airing a full service adult contemporary sound. The format lasted until 1987 when it switched to its current talk radio format.

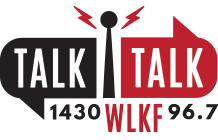
Former logo

On February 12, 2026, a press release from MARC Radio Group announced that they would be acquiring all of Hall Communications' Florida radio stations.
