= WHDD (AM) =

American radio station in Sharon, Connecticut

- Sharon, Connecticut; United States
- Frequency: 1020 kHz
- Branding: Robin Hood Radio

Programming
- Format: Public radio
- Affiliations: National Public Radio

Ownership
- Owner: Tri-State Public Communications, Inc.
- Sister stations: WHDD-FM

History
- First air date: December 23, 1986
- Former call signs: WKZE (1985–2006)
- Call sign meaning: "Robin Hood Radio"

Technical information
- Licensing authority: FCC
- Facility ID: 67774
- Class: D
- Power: 2,500 watts (day); 1,800 watts (critical hours)
- Transmitter coordinates: 41°58′35″N 73°31′27″W
- Translator: W248CZ 97.5 MHz (Kent)
- Repeater: (WHDD-FM) 91.9 MHz (Sharon)

Links
- Public license information: Public file; LMS
- Webcast: Listen live
- Website: www.robinhoodradio.com

WHDD (1020 AM; "Robin Hood Radio") is a radio station licensed to serve Sharon, Connecticut. WHDD airs a public radio format. The station's programming is also heard on WHDD-FM 91.9 in Sharon, and translator W248CZ (97.5 FM) in Kent.

WHDD is powered by 2,500 watts, but to protect KDKA in Pittsburgh on 1020 AM, it can be heard after daylight and sunlight at 1,800 watts during critical hours. The programming can be heard on W248CZ in Kent, on 97.5 MHz, and its sister station WHDD-FM at 91.9 MHz, also in Sharon, Connecticut.

== History ==
The station signed on December 23, 1986, as WKZE. It was the parent station to WKZE-FM 98.1, which signed on in 1993. WKZE changed calls on October 31, 2006, to WHDD. Marshall Miles, WHDD's chief on-air talent and the co-founder and president of Tri-State Public Communications since its formation in 2002, died on June 24, 2023. While WHDD continues to broadcast recorded programming, no announcement has been made concerning the station's long-term fate.

== Translator ==
Broadcast translator for WHDD
Call sign	Frequency	City of license	FID	ERP (W)	Class	Transmitter coordinates	FCC info
W248CZ	97.5 FM	Kent, Connecticut	201696	250	D	41°42′50″N 73°32′7″W	LMS
