= WKZE-FM =

- Salisbury, Connecticut; United States
- Broadcast area: Northern Hudson Valley, Northern Harlem Valley, Northwestern Connecticut
- Frequency: 98.1 MHz
- Branding: KZE 98.1

Programming
- Format: Adult album alternative

Ownership
- Owner: FM Pilot, LLC

History
- First air date: February 16, 1993

Technical information
- Licensing authority: FCC
- Facility ID: 67776
- Class: A
- ERP: 1,800 watts
- HAAT: 184 meters (604 ft)
- Transmitter coordinates: 41°55′07″N 73°34′21″W
- Translator: 105.9 W290BZ (Red Hook, New York)

Links
- Public license information: Public file; LMS
- Webcast: Listen live
- Website: www.wkze.com

WKZE-FM (98.1 MHz, "KZE 98.1") is a radio station licensed to Salisbury, Connecticut, United States. The station broadcasts to the upper Hudson Valley Region, northern Harlem Valley and north western Connecticut. It is independently owned by FM Pilot, LLC, and airs an adult album alternative music format. The broadcast studios are located on North Broadway (U.S. Route 9) in Red Hook, New York. Its programming is also heard on translator station W290BZ (105.9) in Red Hook.

== History ==
In January 1986, the Federal Communications Commission (FCC) added 98.1 MHz to the table of allotments for Salisbury, Connecticut. Chartcom, then owner of WKZE (1020 AM), applied for and was granted a construction permit in March 1988. The allotment was assigned the WKZE-FM call letters by the FCC on March 10, 1988, and intended to go into service later that year. From that point, the construction permit was extended five times until the station was licensed in 1993.

Beginning in December 1992, Tri-State Broadcasting began programming WKZE-FM under a local marketing agreement with owner Chartcom. The lease was converted into a purchase in May 1993. Under Tri-State, the station had a mixed format of classical and alternative music. It was sold in 1996 to Scott Johnson and then to Willpower Radio, LLC, so named for majority shareholder William J. Stanley. In early 2006, Willpower moved the station studios from Sharon, Connecticut, to Red Hook, New York, where they remain today. In July 2009, Willpower, LLC acquired the translator W256BI.

William Stanley died in 2021, and ownership of WKZE-FM was transferred to his wife Barbara. Desiring to ensure the station remained local and not corporate-owned, in 2024 Barbara Stanley spurned larger officers from corporate entities and sold the station for $515,000 to FM Pilot, LLC, owned by Andy Gladding and Katie Berghorn of Brooklyn. After taking control, the new owners replaced the station's original transmitter and upgraded to stereo broadcasting and a digital playout system. They retained the station's local-heavy adult album alternative format, having local bands do jingles for advertising clients.

== Translator ==
Call sign	Frequency	City of license	FID	ERP (W)	HAAT	Class	Transmitter coordinates	FCC info
W290BZ	105.9 FM	Red Hook, New York	140121	250	138.9 m (456 ft)	D	41°59′27.3″N 73°46′24.4″W	LMS
