= WMOS =

- Stonington, Connecticut; United States
- Broadcast area: Southeastern Connecticut; Westerly, Rhode Island
- Frequency: 102.3 MHz
- Branding: 102.3 FM The Wolf

Programming
- Format: Classic rock
- Affiliations: United Stations Radio Networks; Westwood One

Ownership
- Owner: Cumulus Media; (Radio License Holding CBC, LLC)
- Operator: Mohegan Sun
- Sister stations: WQGN-FM; WXLM

History
- First air date: November 1981
- Former call signs: WFAN (1981–1984); WORQ (1984–1987); WVVE (1987–2000); WAXK (2000–2002); WUXL (2002–2003); WXLM (2003–2008)
- Call sign meaning: Mohegan Sun

Technical information
- Licensing authority: FCC
- Facility ID: 60251
- Class: A
- ERP: 3,000 watts
- HAAT: 100 meters (330 ft)
- Transmitter coordinates: 41.4065°N 71.8370°W

Links
- Public license information: Public file; LMS
- Webcast: Listen live
- Website: www.1023thewolf.com

WMOS (102.3 FM, "102.3 The Wolf") is a classic rock radio station licensed to serve Stonington, Connecticut. The station is owned and operated by Cumulus Media and is "powered by Mohegan Sun", the casino in Uncasville. It broadcasts at 102.3 MHz with 3 kilowatts ERP from a tower located in Westerly, Rhode Island, and is partially simulcast on 106.3 WWKX in Woonsocket, Rhode Island.

On March 17, 2008, WMOS changed its frequency from 104.7 FM to 102.3 FM, swapping frequencies with sister station WXLM.

== History ==
The station was assigned the call letters WFAN on November 3, 1981, playing a full service mix of news, sports and adult contemporary music. Later, the music shifted to a contemporary hit radio format with the slogan "Better Hit Music Fun 102". The format changed to satellite delivered AC and the call letters were changed to WORQ on June 20, 1984. The slogan was "102 WORQ, Working for you". The call letters changed again August 17, 1987, to WVVE, starting as a gold based AC and then moving to a full oldies format known as 102.3 The Wave The station kept the call letters WVVE until December 29, 1999, when Citadel Broadcasting purchased the station and flipped formats to hard rock as ROCK 102. They soon changed calls to WAXK. ROCK 102 flipped to a classic hits format under the moniker XL 102 and the WUXL call letters in February 2002. XL 102 featured the syndicated Bob & Tom morning show.

In February 2003 XL 102 was one of two stations (the other being Clear Channel's WHJY in Providence, Rhode Island) that gave away tickets to a Great White concert in West Warwick, Rhode Island, which ultimately became the scene of one of the deadliest fires in Rhode Island's history. In March 2003, a few weeks after the fire XL 102 flipped formats to adult contemporary music and changed its calls to WXLM. (The format change was rumored to be just a coincidence.) As AC formatted MIX 102, WXLM competed against long-time ratings leader Soft Rock 106.5, WBMW.

WXLM dropped its adult contemporary format and began simulcasting the news/talk format of sister station WSUB (980 AM) in April 2005. WSUB began promoting the simulcast in mid-March. WXLM officially became News-Talk 102.3 FM in late June 2005, after WSUB went Spanish as Magia 980.

On March 17, 2008, WXLM's news/talk format moved to 104.7 FM; concurrently, the classic rock programming of WMOS moved to 102.3. Both formats remained the same. In 2010, the news/talk format migrated back as WXLM to AM 980; 104.7 now operates as WELJ.

Citadel merged with Cumulus Media on September 16, 2011.
