= Greater Danbury =

- Metropolitan area
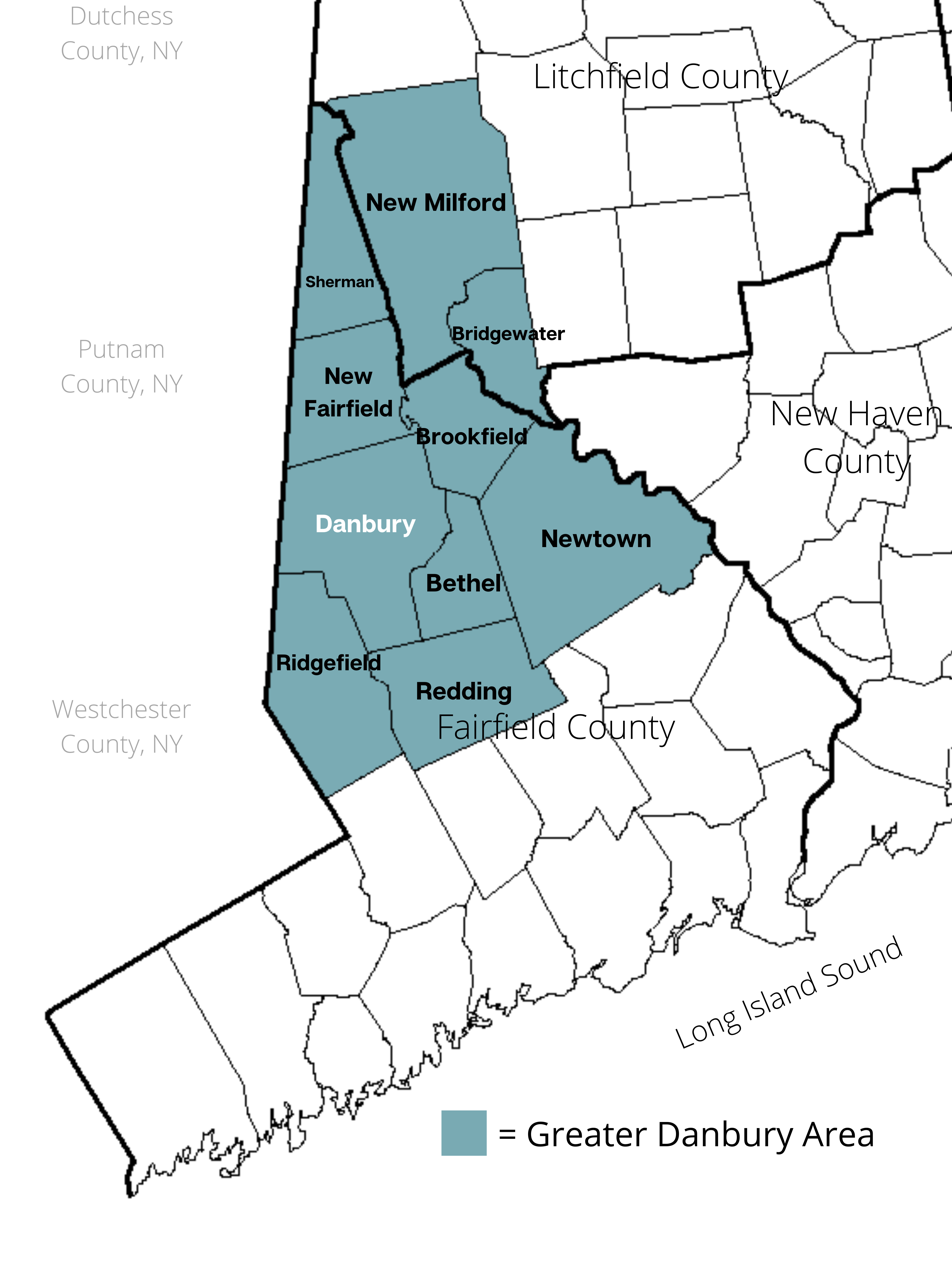
- Map of Greater Danbury
- Country: United States
- State(s): Connecticut
- Region: Western CT
- Largest city: Danbury

Area
  - Total: 430.8 sq mi (1,116 km^{2})

Population (2015)
  - Total: 264,621
  - Rank: 185th in the U.S.
  - Density: 1,400/sq mi (540.6/km^{2})
- Time zone: UTC−05:00 (Eastern Standard Time)
  - Summer (DST): UTC−04:00 (Eastern Daylight Time)

Greater Danbury (Danbury-New Milford Area), also known as the Housatonic Valley Region, is a region in the U.S. state of Connecticut centered on the city of Danbury. It consists of the city of Danbury and adjacent towns in the areas around the Housatonic River and the Still River. The area is also home to Candlewood Lake, the largest lake in the New York metropolitan area.

== Definitions ==
=== New England City and Town Area ===
The U.S. Census Bureau defines the metropolitan area of Danbury as the Danbury Metropolitan NECTA. It consists of the city of Danbury plus the towns of Bethel, Bridgewater, Brookfield, New Fairfield, New Milford, Newtown, Ridgefield, Roxbury, and Sherman for a total of 9 municipalities. As of 2019, the population of the Danbury NECTA was 193,427.

=== Western Connecticut Region ===
The Danbury NECTA is located within the area administered by the Western Connecticut Council of Governments, and is part of the Housatonic Valley Metropolitan Planning Organization.

=== Danbury Labor Market Area ===
As defined by the Bureau of Labor Statistics, the labor market area of Danbury includes the towns in the Housatonic Valley Region plus the towns of Roxbury and Washington for a total of twelve towns.

== List of Municipalities ==
Municipalities within the area known as "Greater Danbury", include:

- Bethel
- Bridgewater
- Brookfield
- Danbury
- New Fairfield
- New Milford
- Newtown
- Redding
- Ridgefield
- Sherman
- Patterson, New York
- Southeast, New York
