= WSDK =

- Bloomfield, Connecticut; United States
- Broadcast area: Hartford metropolitan area
- Frequency: 1550 kHz
- Branding: WSDK 1550 AM

Programming
- Format: Christian talk and teaching
- Affiliations: Salem Radio Network

Ownership
- Owner: Blount Communications; (Blount Masscom, Inc.)
- Sister stations: WFIF; WVNE

History
- First air date: September 6, 1963
- Former call signs: WEXT (1963–1977); WMLB (1977–1986); WGAB (1986–1988); WLVX (1988–1993); WRDM (1993–1998); WDZK (1998–2011)

Technical information
- Licensing authority: FCC
- Facility ID: 37804
- Class: B
- Power: 5,000 watts (days); 2,400 watts (nights)
- Transmitter coordinates: 41°51′47.36″N 72°43′59.34″W
- Translator: 95.3 W237EO (Bloomfield)

Links
- Public license information: Public file; LMS
- Webcast: Listen live
- Website: Official website

WSDK (1550 kHz) is a commercial AM radio station licensed to Bloomfield, Connecticut, and serving the Hartford metropolitan area. It is owned by Blount Communications and broadcasts a Christian talk and teaching radio format. National religious leaders heard on WSDK include Chuck Swindoll, John Daly, June Hunt, David Jeremiah and John MacArthur. WSDK uses a brokered programming plan, where hosts pay for time on the station and they may use their shows to seek donations to their ministries.

By day, WSDK’s transmitter power is 5,000 watts. At night, to avoid interfering with other stations on 1550 kHz (a Canadian clear channel frequency), WSDK reduces power to 2,400 watts. It uses a directional antenna at all times. Programming is also heard on 36-watt FM translator W237EO at 95.3 MHz in Bloomfield.

== History ==
=== WEXT and WMLB ===
On October 6, 1963, the station first signed on. The call sign was WEXT, and it was licensed to West Hartford. WEXT was a 1,000-watt daytimer. It had a country and western format.

The studios originally were located at 999 Farmington Avenue in West Hartford Center, and the transmitter and tower were at 99 Grassmere Avenue in West Hartford. Flood control work on Trout Brook adjacent to the transmitting tower resulted in damage to the ground system. In 1972, the studios were moved to the 2nd floor of the Culbro Building at 630 Oakwood Avenue in West Hartford.

In 1977, the station changed ownership and the callsign was switched to WMLB, which was a combination of the first names of the three owners: Mary, Lou and Barry. Soon afterward, WMLB was one of the first stations in the state to install a satellite downlink when the Mutual Broadcasting System, of which WMLB was a network affiliate, agreed to place a 3-meter downlink on the roof of the transmitter building. This site then served as the Connecticut hub for Mutual and also for the Associated Press for the next ten years.

=== WGAB and WLVX ===
In March 1986, the station changed its callsign to WGAB.

In 1988, the station was off the air for a while. In September 1988, the station returned to the air as WLVX under the ownership of Living Communications, which also owned WLIX in Islip, New York. The new owners brought a Contemporary Christian format to the station, and the studios were moved to the Wintonbury Mall in Bloomfield.

In 1993, the station was sold again, this time to a local group who changed the callsign to WRDM and began programming the station in Italian. The studios were moved to 880 Maple Avenue in Hartford where they shared space with a sister low-power television station, W13BF (which subsequently changed its call letters to WRDM-LP to match the radio station).

=== WDZK and WSDK ===
In May 1998, the station was sold again, this time to the Hibernia Corporation. The format was switched to "Radio Disney" children's programming on May 26, and the studios moved to Franklin Avenue in Hartford. The call sign was then changed to WDZK.

The Walt Disney Company purchased the station from Hibernia in 2000, and continued to operate from the Franklin Avenue location until 2004, when the studios were moved to 160 Chapel Road in Manchester, Connecticut. In February 2008, WDZK commenced HD Radio broadcasting.

Disney took WDZK, along with WDDZ in Pawtucket, Rhode Island, off the air on September 30, 2010, and put the stations up for sale. That November, it was sold to Blount Communications.

The call sign changed to WSDK on February 15, 2011. On March 19, the station resumed broadcasting with a Christian talk and teaching format.

== Translators ==
| Call sign | Frequency | City of license | FID | ERP (W) | HAAT | Class | Transmitter coordinates | FCC info |
|---|---|---|---|---|---|---|---|---|
| W237EO | 95.3 FM | Bloomfield, Connecticut | 140073 | 36 | 80 m (262 ft) | D | 41°47′48.4″N 72°47′48.3″W | LMS |
