= WHUS =

- Storrs, Connecticut; United States
- Broadcast area: Eastern Connecticut
- Frequency: 91.7 MHz

Programming
- Format: Variety

Ownership
- Owner: University of Connecticut; (The Board of Trustees, the University of Connecticut)

History
- First air date: 1957
- Call sign meaning: Huskies

Technical information
- Licensing authority: FCC
- Facility ID: 65451
- Class: B1
- ERP: 4,400 watts (vert.); 1,200 watts (horiz.)
- HAAT: 150 meters (490 ft)
- Transmitter coordinates: 41°48′50.4″N 72°15′34.3″W

Links
- Public license information: Public file; LMS
- Webcast: Listen live
- Website: whus.org

WHUS is a non-commercial educational FM college radio station. It transmits with 4,400 watts on 91.7 MHz from the main campus of the University of Connecticut in Storrs to audiences in eastern Connecticut, southern Massachusetts and western Rhode Island. WHUS operates as a campus-focused station that features members of the student body and the local community.

WHUS also streams their programming through a continuous online stream, and offers news articles, multimedia features, podcasts, and student-submitted work. and is available on the WHUS Radio smartphone app.

== Programming ==
WHUS broadcasts over 100 shows featuring a diverse mix of music, from polka to hip-hop. In 2014 WHUS added a second online streaming station, WHUS-2, to accommodate additional DJs. From 10 a.m. to 1 p.m. on weekdays WHUS airs public affairs and talk programs. It also provides commercial-free coverage of ten sports at UConn.

WHUS has four departments: Music, News, Sports and Talk. The News department has about ten members and focuses on coverage of local news stories, particularly pertaining to the UConn community. The News team is responsible for finding stories, interviewing sources and creating written articles accompanied by audio productions. The News department also produces and hosts a weekly news show in collaboration with The Daily Campus and UCTV called Husky Nation News that provides news updates from the prior week and conversation about campus happenings. WHUS Sports travels across the country, providing play-by-play updates, covering UConn men's and women's basketball and football. They also cover men's and women's soccer, hockey and baseball. In addition to their on-air productions, WHUS hosts multiple concerts at UConn each semester, exposing the community to unique bands and artists.

=== Multimedia ===
In 2014 WHUS opened a multimedia production studio for video and audio recording and mixing. This resulted in the creation of the WHUS Promotions, Training, Online and Tech/IT Departments.

The WHUS Promotions department has two areas of concentration: the marketing and events departments. The marketing department and street team focus on advertising, branding and marketing. The Events department plans and orchestrates the concerts and speakers held throughout the semester. They also help connect WHUS DJs with other organizations for events on campus. The Training department works with the other departments, training in broadcast, media production and management. The Online department produces online content reflective of WHUS' broadcast and non-broadcast activities. Tech/IT educates students on server maintenance, computer support and the functioning of broadcast equipment.

== History ==
WHUS's debut as a non-commercial FM station occurred in 1957. However, organized radio broadcasting at the University of Connecticut began in the early 1920s.

=== WABL / WCAC ===
On June 1, 1923, the university, then called Connecticut Agricultural College, was issued a license for a new AM station using a community service name of Storrs, with sequentially assigned call letters of WABL. The station initially operated on 1060 kHz with 100-watts from an on-campus antenna supported by two 103 foot (31 m) steel towers. In 1925 power was increased to 500 watts and the call letters changed to WCAC.

On April 30, 1936, WCAC's license was voluntarily surrendered for cancellation, due to frustrations over restricted operating hours and constant frequency and power changes mandated by the Federal Radio Commission (FRC) and its 1934 successor the Federal Communications Commission (FCC), that made it impossible for the college to achieve its goal of developing a state-wide educational service.

=== AM carrier current station ===
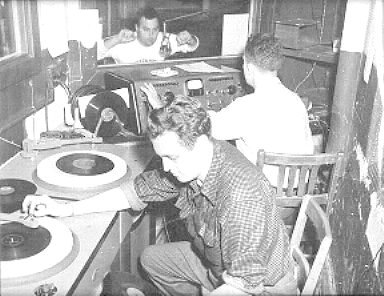
WHUS Studios in Koons Hall (1952)

WHUS (AM) bumper sticker, c. 1963

WHUS Studios, c. 1964

Around the time that WCAC went off the air, students at Brown University in Providence, Rhode Island were developing a campus-wide broadcast service called "The Brown Network". This employed "carrier current" transmissions, using multiple very low power AM band radio transmitters that fed their signals into building electrical wires, for reception by any standard radios that were close by. Because of their extremely limited coverage, the FCC did not require carrier current stations to be licensed. Station installations soon spread to other college campuses, especially in the northeastern United States. Representatives from the University of Connecticut traveled to Brown to investigate the idea, and decided to establish a station at their main campus. In February 1940 the Intercollegiate Broadcasting System (IBS) was formed to coordinate activities between twelve college carrier current stations and to solicit advertisers interested in sponsoring programs geared toward their student audiences, with the University of Connecticut as one of the charter members.

The University of Connecticut station initially identified itself as both the "Husky Network" and "UCBS", which stood for the "University of Connecticut Broadcasting System". It began broadcasting on April 8, 1940, using student-built equipment installed by a group headed by LaVerge Williams. The station was initially funded by the Student Senate, but in the fall of 1941 became financially independent by selling airtime to advertisers. A May 1943 review of the "Husky Network" stated that the station was operating from 7:00-8:30 a.m. and 5:00-11:00 p.m. Monday through Friday, for a total of 37½ hours per week. However, equipment shortages due to the outbreak of World War II, as well as staff entering the military, caused the station to cease operations until after the war.

Operations were reactivated in May 1946, under the guidance of Dan Harris, operating on 560 kHz from 4-10 p.m. A 1948 review stated that transmitters were operating on both 560 and 640 kHz, with advertisers that included local grocery, drug, and stationary stores as well as restaurants. The station now identified itself as "WHUS", although because it did not need a license these call letters were not formally assigned by the FCC. The studios were moved from the basement of Koons Hall to the new Student Union Building in 1952. Between 1954 and 1956, there was another hiatus in broadcasting owing to technical difficulties in complying with FCC restrictions on signal strength. Eventually low power AM broadcasting was resumed at 670 kHz.

Programming on the AM was predominant through the late 1960s, although during periods when the AM and FM stations were carrying the same program, provisions had to be made to avoid airing commercials on the FM side, which was only licensed for non-commercial operation. In 1963 twenty-four-hour-a-day broadcasting was started on WHUS (AM) with the use of 24-inch (61 cm) automatic reverse tape reels that provided 6 hours of programming. However, by the mid-1970s the closed-carrier AM broadcasting system had fallen into disrepair and was discontinued.

=== FM station ===
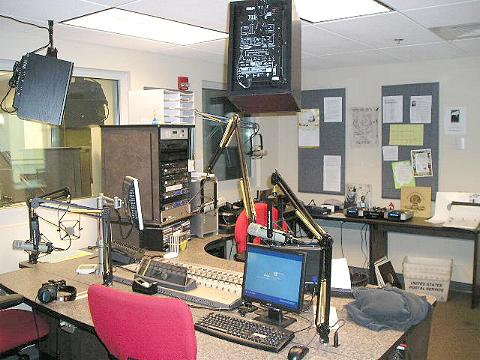
WHUS On-Air Studio in 2007

In 1957 the university received a license for a 10-watt non-commercial FM station operating on 90.5 MHz, which was now formally issued the WHUS call letters by the FCC. This new authorization meant that station coverage was no longer limited to just the campus. WHUS moved to 91.7 MHz in 1966, increased power to 1,250 watts in 1968, then to 3,200 watts in 1974.

In the mid-1970s student managers decided to operate the station 24 hours a day year round, adding non-student volunteers to staff and produce programs. WHUS became a "community" station. Beginning about 1975, a major refurbishment of the studios upgraded the mostly mono vintage equipment so that in 1977 FM-stereo broadcasting could begin.

In 1997, WHUS built a new tower that allowed its signal to reach a 60-mile (97 km) radius. This expansion into the Hartford area helped grow its audience. During the summer of 1998, WHUS began webcasting its air signal over the Internet. The station moved to an old farmhouse on the North Campus in 2002 for the remodeling of the Student Union. In 2006 the station's website, WHUS.org, acquired a new design and a schedule database system, which allowed dynamic displays of currently playing and upcoming shows. In 2007, the station moved into new state-of-the-art studios in the remodeled Student Union.

== Awards ==
Between 2002 and 2013, WHUS was voted "Best College Radio" by the readers of the Hartford Advocate each year except 2006, when it received a second place award. In December 2009, WHUS was recognized as a finalist in the University of Connecticut's Provost's Award for Excellence in Community Engagement.

At the 2014 Intercollegiate Broadcast System Awards in NYC, WHUS Studio Sessions won "Best Live Performance" and "Most Creative Program." WHUS was also a finalist in the "Best Use of Social Media," "Best Sports Broadcast," and "Best Radio Drama" categories that year.

In 2015, WHUS won "Best News Delivery" and "Best Facebook Page" at the College Media Association Apple Awards.

== See also ==
- Campus radio
- List of college radio stations in the United States
