= South Kent, Connecticut =

Village in Connecticut, United States

South Kent is a village located in Litchfield County, Connecticut, United States, alongside the border with New York, and within and part of Kent, Connecticut. South Kent has its own post office, whose ZIP code is 06785. South Kent is also home to South Kent School, a private prep school.

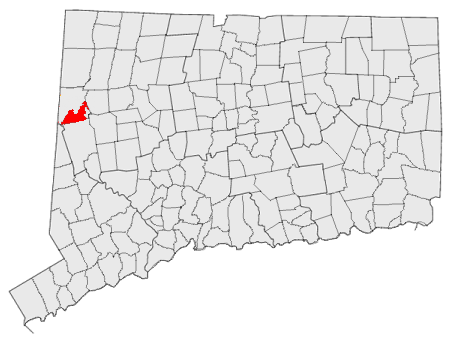
Location of South Kent within the town of Kent and state of Connecticut

== Geography ==
A rural view in South Kent

South Kent is located in Litchfield County. Its location is 41°42′01″N 73°26′49″W. South Kent's terrain is mostly hilly, with small valleys and upland plateaus. There are several bodies of water in South Kent, including Hatch Pond, Mill Pond, Mud Pond, and South Spectacle Lake.

== Demographics ==
As of the census of 2000, there were 578 people living in the town, living in 224 households. The average household size was 2.58 and the average family size was 2.99.

The median income for a household in the town was $60,208, and the median income for a family was $56,964. Males had a median income of $58,875 versus $34,135 for females. The per capita income for the town was $59,245.

== Notable people ==
- David Blitzer - Part owner of the Philadelphia 76ers and New Jersey Devils.
- Sergio Troncoso - Novelist of Kent-inspired Nobody's Pilgrims
