= WWUH =

- West Hartford, Connecticut; United States
- Broadcast area: Greater Hartford
- Frequency: 91.3 MHz

Programming
- Format: College radio

Ownership
- Owner: University of Hartford

History
- First air date: July 15, 1968; 57 years ago
- Call sign meaning: University of Hartford

Technical information
- Licensing authority: FCC
- Facility ID: 68986
- Class: A
- ERP: 440 watts
- HAAT: 239 meters (784 ft)
- Transmitter coordinates: 41.774°N 72.805°W

Links
- Public license information: Public file; LMS
- Website: www.wwuh.org

WWUH is a non-commercial college radio station, licensed to the University of Hartford in West Hartford, Connecticut. The station's first sign-on was on July 15, 1968.

WWUH operates on 91.3 MHz from a tower site in Avon, Connecticut. Some programming is also simulcast on WDJW (89.7 FM) in Somers, Connecticut, when that station is not airing its own programs.

The station is dedicated as "The Louis K. Roth Memorial Station":

Prior to 1968, Louis K. Roth, a generous Regent of the University, had told the President of the University of Hartford that he would finance the radio station. Mr. Roth died before we got things rolling, but his family still came to us with a check for $40,000. While serious consideration was given to changing the station's call letters to WLKR, we instead renamed the radio station the Lewis K. Roth Memorial radio station, and by the time I graduated in 1970, we'd built a complete stereo radio station and still had $14,000 of Mr. Roth's grant left.

== Notable alumni ==
- Mike Crispino (1980), sports commentator

== See also ==
- Folk Next Door
- List of college radio stations in the United States
- List of community radio stations in the United States
