= WNWW =

Faith Radio station in West Hartford, Connecticut

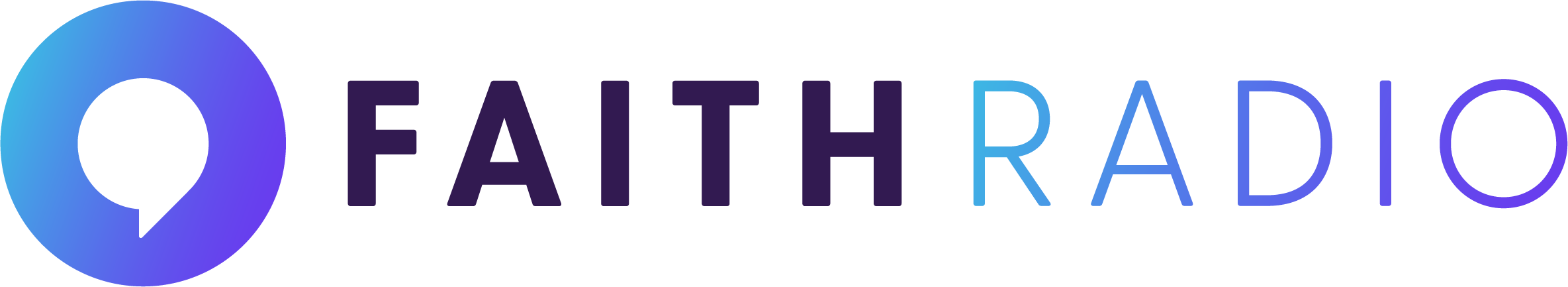
- West Hartford, Connecticut; United States
- Broadcast area: Greater Hartford
- Frequency: 1290 kHz
- Branding: Faith Radio

Programming
- Format: Christian radio
- Affiliations: Northwestern Media

Ownership
- Owner: University of Northwestern – St. Paul

History
- First air date: 1947
- Former call signs: WCCC (1947–2002); WTMI (2002–2007); WCCC (2007–2016)

Technical information
- Licensing authority: FCC
- Facility ID: 25073
- Class: D
- Power: 490 watts (day); 11 watts (night)
- Transmitter coordinates: 41°47′48.36″N 72°47′48.35″W
- Translator: 94.1 W231CZ (Hartford)

Links
- Public license information: Public file; LMS
- Website: myfaithradio.com

WNWW (1290 AM "Faith 1290") is a radio station licensed to West Hartford, Connecticut, and serves the Greater Hartford area. The station is owned by the University of Northwestern – St. Paul. WNWW airs a religious radio format consisting of teaching and talk programs. WNWW is a class D AM station operating with 490 watts during the day and eleven watts at night per FCC rules.

By day, WNWW is powered by 490 watts daytime, at night, to protect other stations on 1290 AM, it lowers it power to 11 watts. Programming is heard on FM translator W241CZ at 94.1 MHz.

Programming is supplied by the Faith Radio service of the University of Northwestern - St. Paul based in Roseville, Minnesota. Hosts include Rick Warren, Jim Daly, David Jeremiah, Chuck Swindoll, and Charles Stanley.

== History ==
WNWW signed on for the first time on October 26, 1947, as WCCC. The station was licensed to Greater Hartford Broadcasting, Inc., owned by brothers Bill and Max Savitt (the former was a well known Hartford jeweler), and later by Ken Cooper. As was common in those days, the studios were located at the transmitter site, which was on South Quaker Lane near Talcott Road in West Hartford. The entire station was housed in a small brick building with "WCCC" in big neon letters on the top adjacent to the 220-foot tall AM tower. WCCC was considered a Full Service station, and offered news, farm reports, sports, and the popular music of the day.

Although one of the lowest-powered stations in Hartford, WCCC's 500-watt signal was strong enough to encompass the entire "greater Hartford" area, which in the late 1940s, consisted of the city of Hartford plus neighboring towns.

Early staff included Ralph Della Silva; Harry Larkin; Betty; Joe Girand; Eve Mink, Continuity; Ray Dower, National Sales Manager; Walt Neilson, Program Director; Bob Sherman, Music Director; and Irene Dolan, Traffic Director. The engineering staff consisted of Thomas York, engineer; Edward Reid and Gil Ford, control engineers; John Rameika, transmitter engineer; and Howard Wessenberg, chief engineer.

As the station grew in popularity and more and more area businesses realized the value of radio advertising, WCCC needed more space and moved its studios in the early 1950s into the historic Hotel Bond in downtown Hartford. Located on the twelfth floor of The Bond was the largest ballroom in the state of Connecticut. Offering a scenic view of Bushnell Park, the Park River and the state Capitol building, the room attracted a wealthy clientele and some of the biggest musical performers of the day including Count Basie, Ella Fitzgerald, Cole Porter, Frank Sinatra, Eugene Ormandy, Nat "King" Cole, and Rosemary Clooney. Many of these artists were interviewed live on WCCC.

The station was in the basement, which Savitt would refer to as the "lower mezzanine level." The WCCC studios were located along the left-hand side of a basement hallway, within aroma-reach of The Bond's downstairs kitchens. The largest room featured a glass paneled wall from which visitors could view whatever was happening during studio usage. The studio contained a grand piano and an RCA cutting lathe for making 10-, 12-, and 16-inch disc recordings. The studio had a doorway that led to a much smaller step-up studio that also had a doorway that led into the control room. Each room had windows looking onto each other. The small studio was used for newscasts and/or celebrity seating during live interviews. However, nearly all of the on-air originations emanated from the control room. It had an RCA console with RCA rim drive turntables: two facing the large studio and one on the opposite side. The announcer sat in a roll-about chair at the console microphone and behind him were storage slots holding acetate discs filled with locally produced commercials plus factory made vinyl discs supplied by ad agencies. Above the shelving were two Magnecord PT-6J tape recorders.

WCCC was one of the first stations in the state that had music and news, and they sold what they billed as "TNT" (Time, News and Temperature) to advertisers, which was a big thing on the radio in those days.

Bill Savitt was a savvy businessman with a knack for promotion. According to newspaper accounts, by 1950, he was running over 400 spots a week for Savitt Jewelers on WCCC, and the same amount on four other competing Hartford stations. Later, he would become one of Hartford's most prolific TV advertisers.

During the 1950s, Ivor Hugh was host of the classical music show "Good Evening, Good Music", and the children's show "The Friendly Forest".

A sister station WCCC-FM was licensed on a frequency of 106.9 MHz in 1959, and went on the air June 7, 1960. For the next several decades, WCCC AM and FM would simulcast each other, though the AM split off to run a talk format for a brief time in the early 1980s.

In the mid-1960s, WCCC-AM-FM moved its studios and offices to 11 Asylum Street in Hartford and changed from a full-service format to an "All Request" format, which was simulcast in part on WCCC-FM. Also during this time, both stations were purchased the record label Elektra, marking them some of the few in the United States to have this distinction.

Sy Dresner purchased the stations in the early 1970s, and by the mid-1970s, both signals had switched to a rock music format, first with a more freeform, progressive edge, which then evolved to a more mainstream album rock format. National commentator Paul Harvey was heard on WCCC for close to two decades. In 1980, the operations were moved to 243 South Whitney Street in Hartford. In 1998, Marlin Broadcasting purchased the stations from Sy Dresner's Greater Hartford Communications Corporation, and moved the station to 1039 Asylum Avenue in Hartford; by this time, WCCC (AM) aired an active rock format.

In 1990, the station lost its lease on the AM tower site on South Quaker Lane in West Hartford and constructed a new tower at the FM's site on Avon Mountain in West Hartford to allow both AM and FM stations to utilize the site. This necessitated the change in city of license from Hartford to West Hartford.

Howard Stern started his radio career as a morning host at WCCC AM/FM in the late 1970s (he also met his first producer, Fred Norris, at the station). He returned to WCCC (via syndication) in 1995 before leaving radio for Sirius Satellite Radio in 2005. Other notable hosts over the years were Bob Crane, Rusty Potz, Stoneman, The Ozzman, The Lich, Sebastian, Picozzi and the Horn, and Country Paul Payton.

In 2002, WCCC stopped simulcasting its sister FM station and flipped to a classical music format originated by beethoven.com, a Marlin Broadcasting subsidiary co-located at the Asylum Avenue studios. WCCC therefore became one of a very few commercial classical music stations in the United States.

Between January 9, 2002, and February 1, 2007, WCCC used the WTMI call letters. Those call letters formerly belonged to an FM station in Miami, Florida. Beethoven.com originated as a part of the classical music station in that market.

In April 2007, the programming of WCCC was added to the HD2 sub-channel of WCCC-FM.

On July 30, 2014, Marlin announced that they would be selling both WCCC AM and FM to EMF Broadcasting, which would result in the discontinuation of the classical music format after 12 years (and 39 years for the FM's rock format) and flipping the stations to the nationwide K-Love network, which airs contemporary Christian music. The switch took place on August 1.

On January 20, 2016, EMF filed an application to donate WCCC to the University of Northwestern – St. Paul. On March 29, 2016, the station changed its call sign to WNWW, coinciding with the donation being consummated. On March 30, 2016, WNWW changed its format to University of Northwestern's Faith Radio religious format.

== Translators ==
Broadcast translator for WNWW
Call sign	Frequency	City of license	FID	ERP (W)	Class	Transmitter coordinates	FCC info	Notes
W231CZ	94.1 FM	Hartford, Connecticut	139521	32	D	41°47′48″N 72°47′48″W	LMS	Translator owned by the Educational Media Foundation.
