= WXLM =

Coordinates: 41°23′5.35″N 72°4′11.28″W

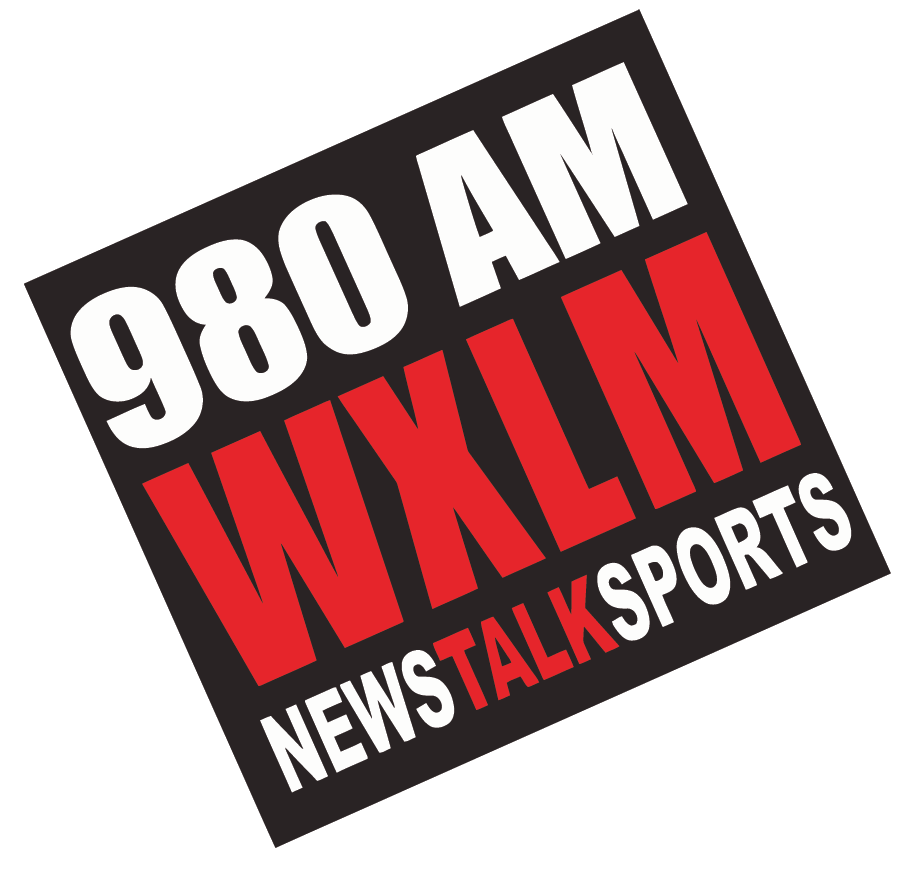
- Groton, Connecticut; United States
- Broadcast area: Greater New London
- Frequency: 980 kHz
- Branding: News Talk 980 WXLM

Programming
- Format: News/talk
- Affiliations: Compass Media Networks; Fox News Radio; Westwood One

Ownership
- Owner: Cumulus Media; (Radio License Holding CBC, LLC)
- Sister stations: WMOS; WQGN-FM

History
- First air date: July 26, 1958
- Former call signs: WSUB (1958–2010)

Technical information
- Licensing authority: FCC
- Facility ID: 10454
- Class: D
- Power: 1,000 watts (day); 72 watts (night)

Links
- Public license information: Public file; LMS
- Webcast: Listen live
- Website: www.980wxlm.com

WXLM (980 AM) is a commercial radio station licensed to Groton, Connecticut, and serving Greater New London. It broadcasts a news/talk radio format and is owned by Cumulus Media. WXLM's studios and offices are located on Wampanoag Trail in East Providence.

By day, WXLM transmits with 1,000 watts. To protect other stations on 980 AM at night, WXLM reduces power to 72 watts at sunset. It uses a non-directional antenna. The station's transmitter is on Briar Hill Road near Gungywamp Road.

== Programming ==
Weekday mornings on WXLM begin with The Gene Valicenti Show from sister station WPRO/WEAN-FM in Providence. The rest of the day is made up of nationally syndicated conservative talk shows from co-owned Westwood One: Chris Plante, Vince Coglianese, Guy Benson, Ben Shapiro, Mark Levin, America at Night with Rick Valdes and Red Eye Radio.

Weekends feature shows on money, health, home repair, technology and real estate. Weekend hosts include Kim Komando and Bill Cunningham. Most hours begin with world and national news from Fox News Radio. Local news updates are provided by the staff at WPRO.

== History ==
On July 26, 1958, the station signed on the air. For more than 50 years, the station's call sign was WSUB. Groton and New London are noted for their shipbuilding industry, including the construction of submarines.

The station was originally a daytimer, required to go off the air at night. It was owned by Lawrence A. Reilly and James A. Spates. The original studios were at 119 Bridge Street in Groton. It had a full service radio format of popular adult music, news and sports.

In 1971, it added an FM station on 105.5 MHz, WSUB-FM (now WQGN-FM). In the 1990s, WSUB received authorization from the Federal Communications Commission to broadcast around the clock, adding low power operation at night.

WSUB and WQGN-FM were acquired by Citadel Broadcasting in the early 2000s. Citadel merged with Cumulus Media on September 16, 2011.
