= Hotel Bond =

Coordinates: 41.7678°N 72.6791°W

- Interactive map of the Hotel Bond area
- Hotel chain: Hilton (current)

General information
- Location: 338 Asylum Street
- Opening: 1913

Technical details
- Floor count: 4 (oldest building: East Wing); 6 (middle building); 12 (newest building: West Wing)

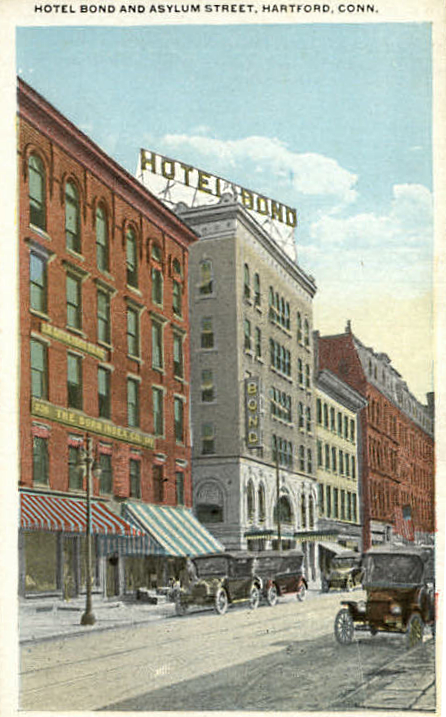
Hotel Bond, first section, ca. 1913-1920

Hotel Bond is a historic hotel, built in two stages in 1913 and 1921, in downtown Hartford, Connecticut by hotelier Harry S. Bond. It is located near Bushnell Park, and was considered the grandest hotel in Hartford during its heyday. The second section, the West Wing, is a 12-story building attached to the 6 story first section, and the hotel also acquired and incorporated an older, adjacent 4-story building, the East Wing. The old East Wing was demolished in the 1960s. A Statler Hotel opened in the area in 1954, creating competition, and the Bond Hotel company declared bankruptcy shortly after that. It was bought by the California-based Masaglia Hotel chain, which began an incremental renovation program. In 1964 it was sold to a Cincinnati, Ohio investment group which announced extensive renovation plans. However, the financing plans fell through and the hotel was again in bankruptcy. The building was sold at auction to the Roman Catholic Archdiocese of Hartford in 1965, and it became the home of the Saint Francis Hospital School of Nursing. The Bond Ballroom reopened in 2001, with the rest of the building becoming a Homewood Suites by Hilton in 2006.

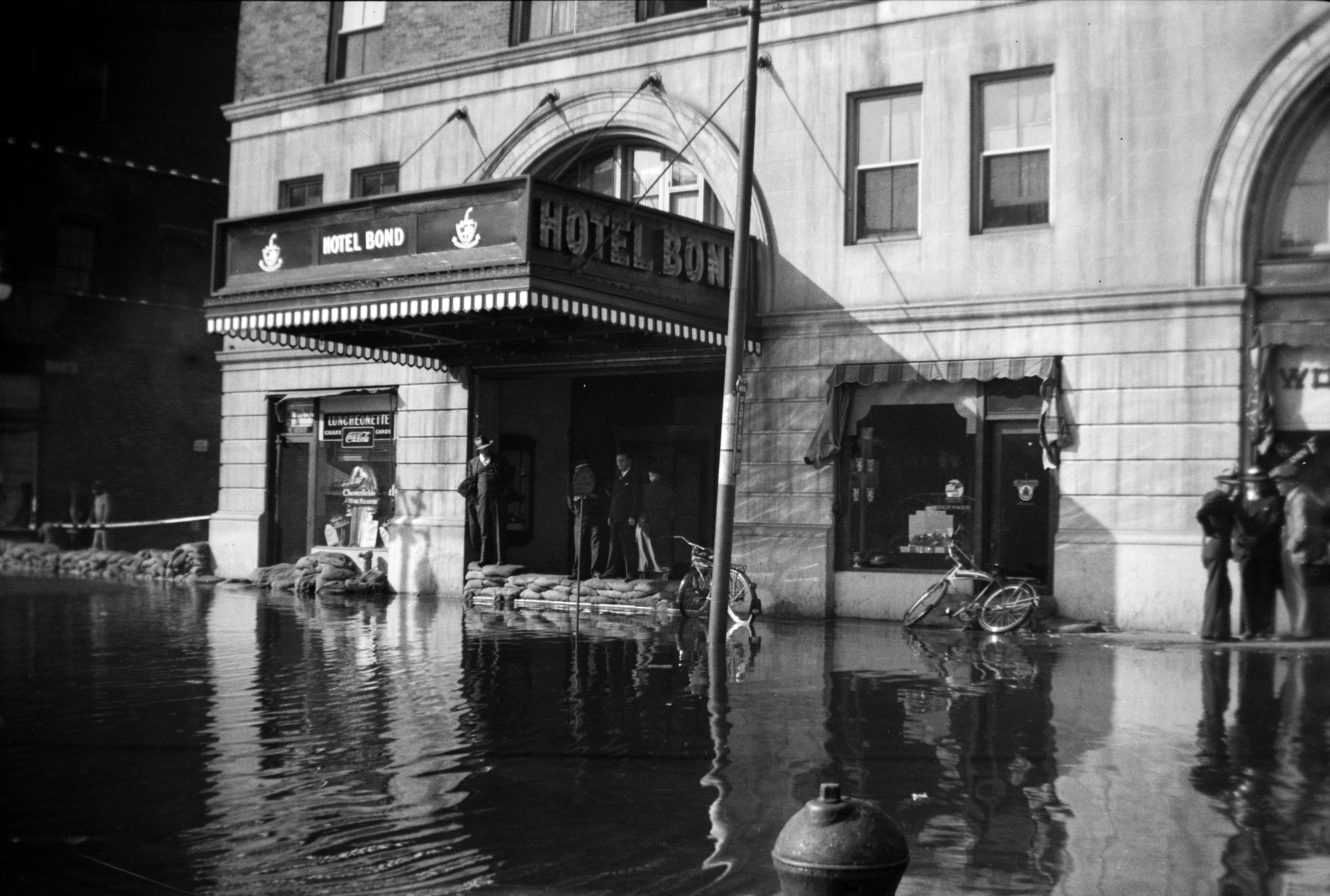
Hotel entrance, during the 1936 Connecticut River Flood
