= WNLC =

- East Lyme, Connecticut; United States
- Broadcast area: New London, Connecticut
- Frequency: 98.7 MHz
- Branding: 98.7 WNLC

Programming
- Format: Classic rock

Ownership
- Owner: Hall Communications, Inc.
- Sister stations: WCTY; WICH; WILI; WILI-FM

History
- First air date: 1994
- Former call signs: WXZR (1992–1997); WNLC-FM (1997–1998)
- Call sign meaning: New London, Connecticut

Technical information
- Licensing authority: FCC
- Facility ID: 25406
- Class: A
- ERP: 5,500 watts
- HAAT: 82 meters (269 ft)
- Transmitter coordinates: 41°23′6.4″N 72°4′11.3″W

Links
- Public license information: Public file; LMS
- Webcast: Listen live
- Website: www.wnlc.com

WNLC (98.7 FM) is an American radio station licensed to serve the community of East Lyme, Connecticut. The station is owned by Hall Communications, Inc. and airs a classic rock music format.

The station was assigned the WNLC call letters by the Federal Communications Commission on April 24, 1998.
