= WHDD-FM =

- Sharon, Connecticut; United States
- Broadcast area: Amenia, New York
- Frequency: 91.9 MHz
- Branding: Robin Hood Radio

Programming
- Format: Public and community radio
- Affiliations: NPR

Ownership
- Owner: Tri-State Public Communications, Inc.

History
- First air date: May 5, 2008

Technical information
- Licensing authority: FCC
- Facility ID: 173310
- Class: A
- ERP: 650 watts
- HAAT: −19 meters (−62 ft)
- Transmitter coordinates: 41.892°N 73.454°W

Links
- Public license information: Public file; LMS
- Webcast: Listen live
- Website: www.robinhoodradio.com

WHDD-FM (91.9 FM, "Robin Hood Radio") is a NPR-affiliated radio station licensed to serve Sharon, Connecticut. WHDD-FM is owned by Tri-State Public Communications, Inc. Marshall Miles, WHDD's chief on-air talent and the co-founder and president of Tri-State Public Communications since its formation in 2002, died on June 24, 2023. While WHDD continues to broadcast recorded programming, no announcement has been made concerning the station's long-term fate.

== See also ==
- List of community radio stations in the United States
