= WLAT =

Radio station in New Britain, Connecticut

- New Britain, Connecticut; United States
- Broadcast area: Greater Hartford
- Frequency: 910 kHz
- Branding: Relevant Radio

Programming
- Format: Catholic radio
- Network: Relevant Radio

Ownership
- Owner: Relevant Radio, Inc.

History
- First air date: May 20, 1949
- Former call signs: WCNW (CP, 1948); WHAY (1948–1965); WRCH (1965–1974); WRCQ (1974–1990); WNEZ (1990–2001)
- Call sign meaning: "Latino" (previous format)

Technical information
- Licensing authority: FCC
- Facility ID: 1911
- Class: B
- Power: 5,000 watts (day); 2,800 watts (night)
- Transmitter coordinates: 41°42′58.36″N 72°48′35.36″W
- Translator: 101.7 W269DE (New Britain)

Links
- Public license information: Public file; LMS
- Webcast: Listen live
- Website: relevantradio.com

WLAT (910 AM) is a radio station licensed to New Britain, Connecticut, and serving the Greater Hartford market. WLAT airs a Catholic radio format. Owned by Relevant Radio, WLAT's transmitter array is located behind the Connecticut School of Broadcasting on Birdseye Road in Farmington (also known as "Radio Park"). The station also operates translator W269DE (101.7 FM) in New Britain.

== History ==
This station originally came on the air May 20, 1949, as WHAY. Its original studios were in New Britain; the transmitter was located at the present location on Birdseye Road in Farmington. The call sign were changed in February 1965, to WRCH, and a few years later, the station adopted a beautiful music format. In 1967, new studios were constructed at the tower site on Birdseye Road. They called the facility "Radio Park". The call sign were changed to WRCQ ("91 Q") on October 23, 1974.

After American Radio Systems purchased the station in the late-1980s, the format was changed to rebroadcasting CNN Headline News; the station became WNEZ on January 5, 1990. On March 26, 1997, the station flipped to urban contemporary as "Jamz 910 AM".

In 2001, Spanish broadcaster Mega Broadcasting's Alfredo Alonso purchased the station for $750,000, and changed the format to Spanish as "Amor 910" on May 5 of that year. At that time, studios were off Route 6 in Farmington. Mega later moved the studios to 330 Main Street in Hartford. On May 25, 2001, Mega swapped the call letters with their other Hartford area station (1230 AM), with 910 becoming WLAT. The station was purchased by Freedom Communications in 2002. Gois Broadcasting purchased the station in 2008.

Relevant Radio agreed to purchase WLAT for $400,000 in November 2025, marking the Catholic radio network's entry to Connecticut. The sale was completed in March 2026.

== Translator ==
Broadcast translator for WLAT
Call sign	Frequency	City of license	FID	ERP (W)	Class	Transmitter coordinates	FCC info
W269DE	101.7 FM	New Britain, Connecticut	143539	250	D	41°42′58.4″N 72°48′35.4″W	LMS
