= WNEZ =

- Manchester, Connecticut; United States
- Broadcast area: Hartford-New Britain-Middletown
- Frequency: 1230 kHz
- Branding: Island Mango Radio 105.3

Programming
- Format: Caribbean music

Ownership
- Owner: Island Mango Radio, LLC

History
- First air date: May 18, 1958
- Former call signs: WINF (1958–1984); WKHT (1984–1989); WFNS (1989); WLVH (1989–1991); WLAT (1991–2001); WNEZ (2001–2004); WKND (2004–2007)

Technical information
- Licensing authority: FCC
- Facility ID: 36684
- Class: C
- Power: 1,000 watts
- Transmitter coordinates: 41°46′34.36″N 72°33′25.32″W
- Translator: 105.3 W287CS (Manchester)

Links
- Public license information: Public file; LMS
- Website: islandmangoradio.com

WNEZ (1230 AM) is a radio station broadcasting a Caribbean music format. Licensed to Manchester, Connecticut, United States, the station serves the Hartford-New Britain-Middletown area. The station is owned by Gois Broadcasting of Connecticut, LLC. Its programming is also heard on FM translator W287CS (105.3) in Manchester.

== Prior use of 1230 kHz ==
The 1230 kHz frequency, and its pre-NARBA predecessor of 1200 kHz, were occupied from August 1936 to February 1954 by WTHT, a station owned by The Hartford Times newspaper. WTHT was Hartford's third radio station, affiliated with the Mutual Broadcasting System from 1936 to 1945 and ABC from 1945 to 1954. An FM adjunct, WTHT-FM 106.1, operated from 1948 to 1950.

The Times and General Tele-Radio, owner of Hartford station WONS, both applied for channel 18 after the Federal Communications Commission took applications for the newly opened channel. In October 1953, the two parties agreed to merge their broadcasting interests in Hartford. As a result, WTHT radio left the air on February 13, 1954; WONS became WGTH, which added ABC programming to its schedule.

== History ==
After WTHT left the air, a number of applicants sought to use the 1230 frequency in Hartford, East Hartford, or Manchester. Brothers Broadcasting Company proposed a station in Hartford; Regional Broadcasting Company specified East Hartford; and John Deme–owned Manchester Broadcasting Company proposed a station in Manchester. The FCC issued a decision favoring Deme in July 1957.

WINF began broadcasting on May 18, 1958, from studios in the Manchester Shopping Parkade.

In the 1980s, the studios were moved to Wethersfield Avenue in Hartford. In 1994, the studios were moved to the fourth floor of a building on Cedar Street in Hartford, and the station—then WLAT—operated with a Spanish-language format under new ownership. In 1999, Alfredo Alonso's Mega Broadcasting purchased the station for $575,000 from Jeffrey Dressler. WLAT moved again in 2000, this time to 330 Main Street where it joined station WNEZ (910 AM); the two stations swapped call signs in 2001. In 2002, Freedom Communications purchased both stations. Ownership changed again in 2007 to Gois, and the studios moved to East Hartford.

Gois sold WNEZ to Island Mango Radio, controlled by Mable Duncan, for $110,000 in 2026. By this point, the station had shifted to a Caribbean music format, also called "Island Mango Radio".

== Translators ==
Call sign	Frequency	City of license	FID	ERP (W)	HAAT	Class	Transmitter coordinates	FCC info
W287CS	105.3 FM	Manchester, Connecticut	138539	247	58 m (190 ft)	D	41°46′34.4″N 72°33′25.3″W	LMS
