= William Luke =

American papermaker

- Born: 28 May 1829; Perth and Kinross, Scotland
- Died: 24 November 1912 (aged 83); Beechfield, Baltimore, Maryland, U.S.
- Resting place: Wilmington and Brandywine Cemetery, Wilmington, Delaware, U.S.
- Known for: Founding the West Virginia Pulp & Paper Company

William G. Luke (28 May 1829 — 24 November 1912) was an American businessman who founded the West Virginia Pulp & Paper Company, the forerunner of Meadwestvaco Corporation, in 1888 at Piedmont, West Virginia and Luke, Maryland, United States.

== Immigration, family, and career ==
The son of John, a master paper maker at Crook of Devon, Luke came to America from Scotland in 1852. He was a pioneer of the modern art of papermaking.

Luke worked as the manager of the Jessup & Moore Paper Company in Wilmington, Delaware, from 1862 to 1898. He had a large family of six sons (John G., William A., David L., Adam K., James L., and Thomas) and two daughters (Jean and Isabel), with David going to college and earning chemistry and chemical engineering degrees. In 1887/1888, as part of their new West Virginia Pulp and Paper Company, Luke and his sons John and David opened a paper mill along the Potomac River on the West Virginia–Maryland border.

In 1888, papermaking still relied heavily on rags as the most common raw material. The price of rags had skyrocketed due to demand during the Civil War, and other viable sources of pulp fibers were being sought. The Luke mill was the first to successfully develop the process of using wood for manufacturing pulp. Wood pulp paper is now the most common type.

In 1898, the company was officially incorporated and included three mills in West Virginia and Maryland.

== Legacy ==
The town of Luke, Maryland, formerly known as West Piedmont, is named for William Luke.

The West Virginia Pulp and Paper Company changed its name to Westvaco in 1969. Westvaco merged with Mead in 2002 to form MeadWestvaco. Its printing and writing paper business, which operated the paper mill in Luke, was sold in 2005 and became NewPage, acquired by the Verso Corporation in 2015. Verso closed the Luke, Maryland, mill in 2019.

MeadWestvaco was led by successive members of the Luke family to the sixth generation, until its 2015 merger with RockTenn formed the WestRock company. By then, the Luke family's ownership of the company had decreased to two percent.
