= Wehn =

Wehn may refer to:

== People ==
- Henning Wehn (born 1974), German comedian

== Places ==
- Wehn, Waldbröl, Germany
- Wehn Valley or Wehntal, Switzerland

== Other ==
- WEHN or WEHM, American radio station
