= John Luke =

John Luke may refer to:

- John A. Luke Jr., chief executive officer of MeadWestvaco
- John Luke (artist) (1906–1975), Irish artist
- John Luke (died 1452), MP for Dunwich (UK Parliament constituency)
- John Luke (English politician) (1563–1638), English politician who sat in the House of Commons from 1610 to 1611
- John Luke (New Zealand politician) (1858–1931), New Zealand politician
- John-Luke Roberts, British stand-up comedian, writer, actor and performer
