= WEHM =

WEHM and WEHN
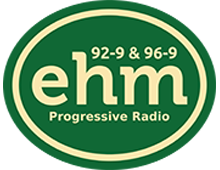

WEHM: Manorville, New York; WEHN: East Hampton, New York; United States
- Broadcast area: Suffolk County, New York; Eastern Long Island; Southeastern Connecticut
- Frequencies: WEHM: 92.9 MHz; WEHN: 96.9 MHz
- Branding: 92-9 and 96-9 'EHM

Programming
- Format: Adult album alternative

Ownership
- Owner: Lauren and Roger Stone; (LRS Radio, LLC)
- Sister stations: WBAZ; WBEA

History
- First air date: WEHM: 2003; WEHN: 1993
- Former call signs: WEHM: WCSO (2001–2003); WWHL (2003); WHBE (2003); WEHN: WVEH (1990–1991); WQEH (1991–1992); WEHM (1992–2003); WHBE (2003–2006)
- Former frequencies: WEHN: 96.7 MHz (1993–2006)
- Call sign meaning: WEHM: East Hampton–Manorville; WEHN: East Hampton

Technical information
- Licensing authority: FCC
- Facility ID: WEHM: 52059; WEHN: 18218
- Class: WEHM: A; WEHN: A
- ERP: WEHM: 3,100 watts; WEHN: 4,300
- HAAT: WEHM: 141 meters (463 ft); WEHN: 117 meters (384 ft)
- Transmitter coordinates: WEHM: 40°51′18.4″N 72°46′9.4″W; WEHN: 40°59′37.3″N 72°10′17.2″W

Links
- Public license information: WEHM: Public file; LMS; WEHN: Public file; LMS
- Webcast: Listen live
- Website: www.wehm.com

WEHM (92.9 FM) is an adult album alternative formatted radio station licensed to Manorville, New York and serving Suffolk County, New York. WEHM's programming is simulcast on WEHN (96.9 FM) East Hampton, New York, the station which originally had been home to WEHM when it was located on 96.7 FM. WEHN's signal covers the eastern Long Island and southeastern Connecticut areas.

The stations were purchased in 2013 for $3.2 million and licensed to LRS Radio, LLC, which is owned by WEHM on-air talent Lauren Stone (68.8%) and her father Roger W. Stone (31.2%), the chairman/CEO of Kapstone Paper & Packaging Company in Northbrook, Illinois. Both stations broadcast from studios in Water Mill, New York, alongside sister stations WBAZ and WBEA.

== History ==
WEHM signed on in 1993 at 96.7 MHz licensed in East Hampton to East Hampton Broadcasting. Its ownership was made up of majority owners Leonard Ackerman, a local attorney, and Mickey Schulhof, then Sony Corporation of America chairman, with minority interest held by such notables as Billy Joel, Christie Brinkley and others. The station would sign on with an adult contemporary format, later changing to an adult album alternative format which proved very successful.

In 2000, then-owner AAA Entertainment obtained a construction permit for a new FM station at 92.9 MHz licensed to Southampton, New York. After several years of planning and development, the 92.9 frequency would sign on in June 2003 and would become WEHM's permanent home that July. At that time, the 96.7 frequency took the WHBE calls and took on a Bloomberg Radio format (a move reportedly done by the influence of Michael Bloomberg).

The two WEHMs would be united in April 2006 when WHBE quietly moved up the dial from 96.7 to 96.9 MHz and began to simulcast WEHM's programming. WHBE changed its call letters to WEHN.

On June 24, 2008, the FCC approved a change in WEHM's community of license from Southampton to Manorville.
