= WLIE =

WLIE may refer to:

- WLYV, a radio station (1290 AM) licensed to serve Bellaire, Ohio, United States, which held the call sign WLIE from 2019 to 2021
- WBWD (AM), a radio station (540 AM) licensed to serve Islip, New York, United States, which held the call sign WLIE from 2002 to 2018
- WKYX-FM, a radio station (94.3 FM) licensed to serve Golconda, Illinois, United States, which held the call sign WLIE in 2002
- WBAZ, a radio station (102.5 FM) licensed to serve Bridgehampton, New York, which held the call sign WLIE from 1994 to 1997
