= Luke, Maryland =

- Town
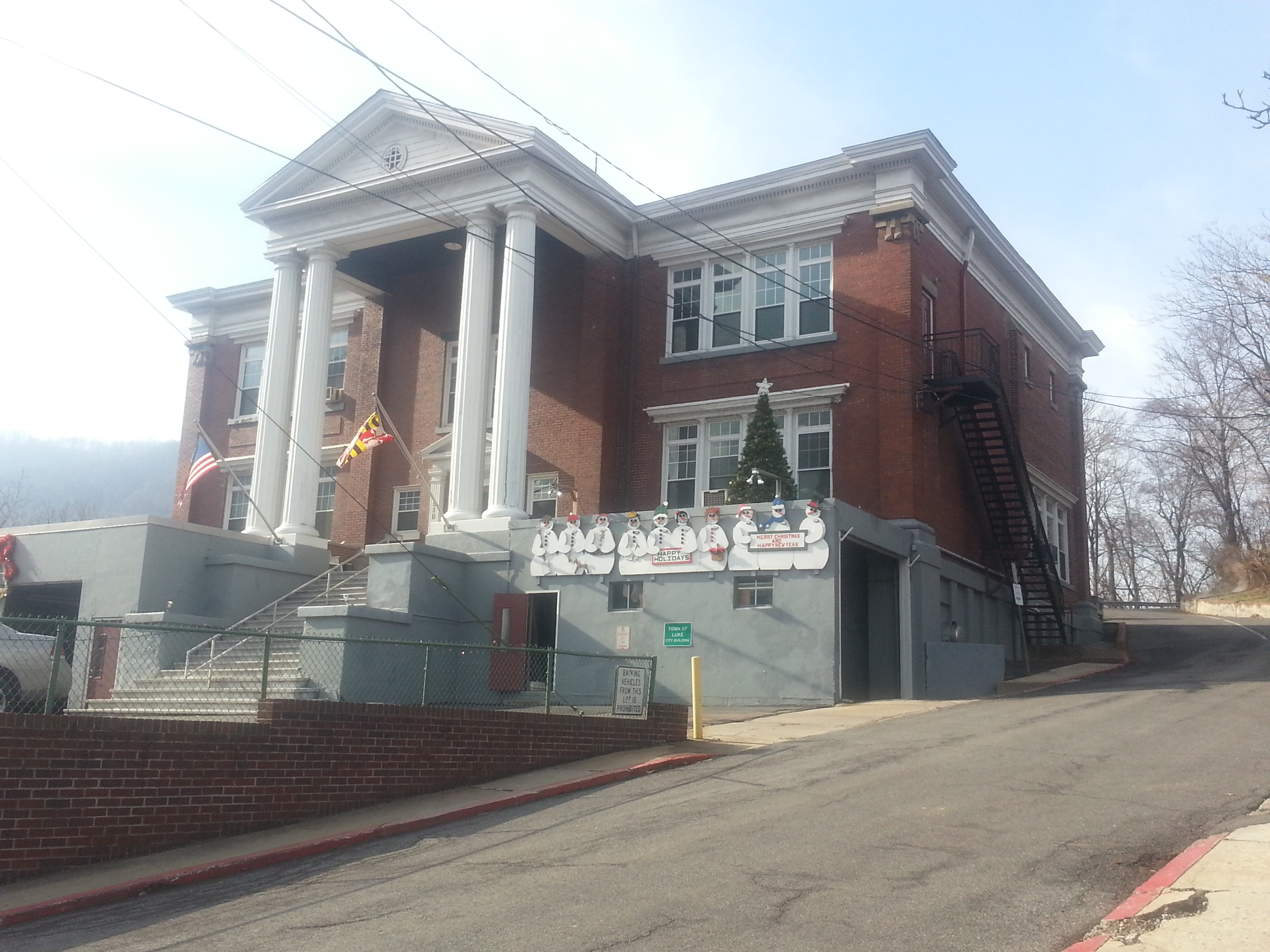
- City Building in January 2014

- Flag Seal

- Location of Luke within Allegany County

- Location of Luke within Maryland Luke (the United States)
- Coordinates: 39°28′32″N 79°3′28″W
- Country: United States
- State: Maryland
- County: Allegany
- Incorporated: 1922

Government
  - Mayor: Edward Clemons, Jr. (R)

Area
  - Total: 0.31 sq mi (0.79 km^{2})
  - Land: 0.27 sq mi (0.69 km^{2})
  - Water: 0.039 sq mi (0.10 km^{2})
- Elevation: 1,191 ft (363 m)

Population (2020)
  - Total: 85
  - Density: 319.2/sq mi (123.25/km^{2})
- Time zone: UTC-5 (Eastern (EST))
  - Summer (DST): UTC-4 (EDT)
- ZIP code: 21540
- Area codes: 301, 240
- FIPS code: 24-48775
- GNIS feature ID: 2391277

Luke is a town in Allegany County, Maryland, United States, located along the Potomac River just upstream of Westernport. Known originally as West Piedmont, the town is part of the Cumberland, MD-WV Metropolitan Statistical Area. The population was 85 as of the 2020 census.

== History ==
The town of Luke was settled in the early 1770s after the organization of Hampshire County, West Virginia (at that time part of Virginia) in 1757. Among the first settlers to arrive were the Davis brothers (Henry and Thomas), who established a saw mill where the town of Luke now stands. The mill provided cross-ties to the Baltimore and Ohio Railroad as it pushed its rails westward through the Piedmont area of what is now West Virginia.

When the railroad suspended building in the 1880s, the Davis brothers disbanded and sold their property to William Luke, who founded the Piedmont Pulp and Paper Company there with his sons in 1888. With this and other paper mills they had built in West Virginia and Maryland, they formed the West Virginia Pulp and Paper Company in 1897. When the railroad needed a name for the stop it established near the site, it used the name "Luke".

The land on which Luke was built was originally an island formed by a split in the Potomac River. It was known as West Piedmont and claimed by Piedmont, West Virginia until the river's path changed and the land reverted to Maryland.

Over the next several decades, Luke prospered with the operation of the paper mill, the influx of other "heavy" industrial concerns, and the establishment of the usual supporting mom-and-pop businesses. Nearby, along the Savage River, there was a gun factory that provided muskets with bayonets for the United States Army at Harpers Ferry. Luke was also home of an automobile manufacturing plant where the Maryland Steamer was produced, as well as a post card factory.

With Luke's growth came citizens' concerns about educational and social issues. Schooling in private homes and business buildings was relocated to a two-room schoolhouse. Growing enrollment in the first through eighth grades brought about construction of a new school that opened in September 1913. It served the town for forty-six years, sending its students off to Bruce High School in Westernport. When the school closed in 1959, the building was converted for use as the town's administrative offices.

== Paper company ==
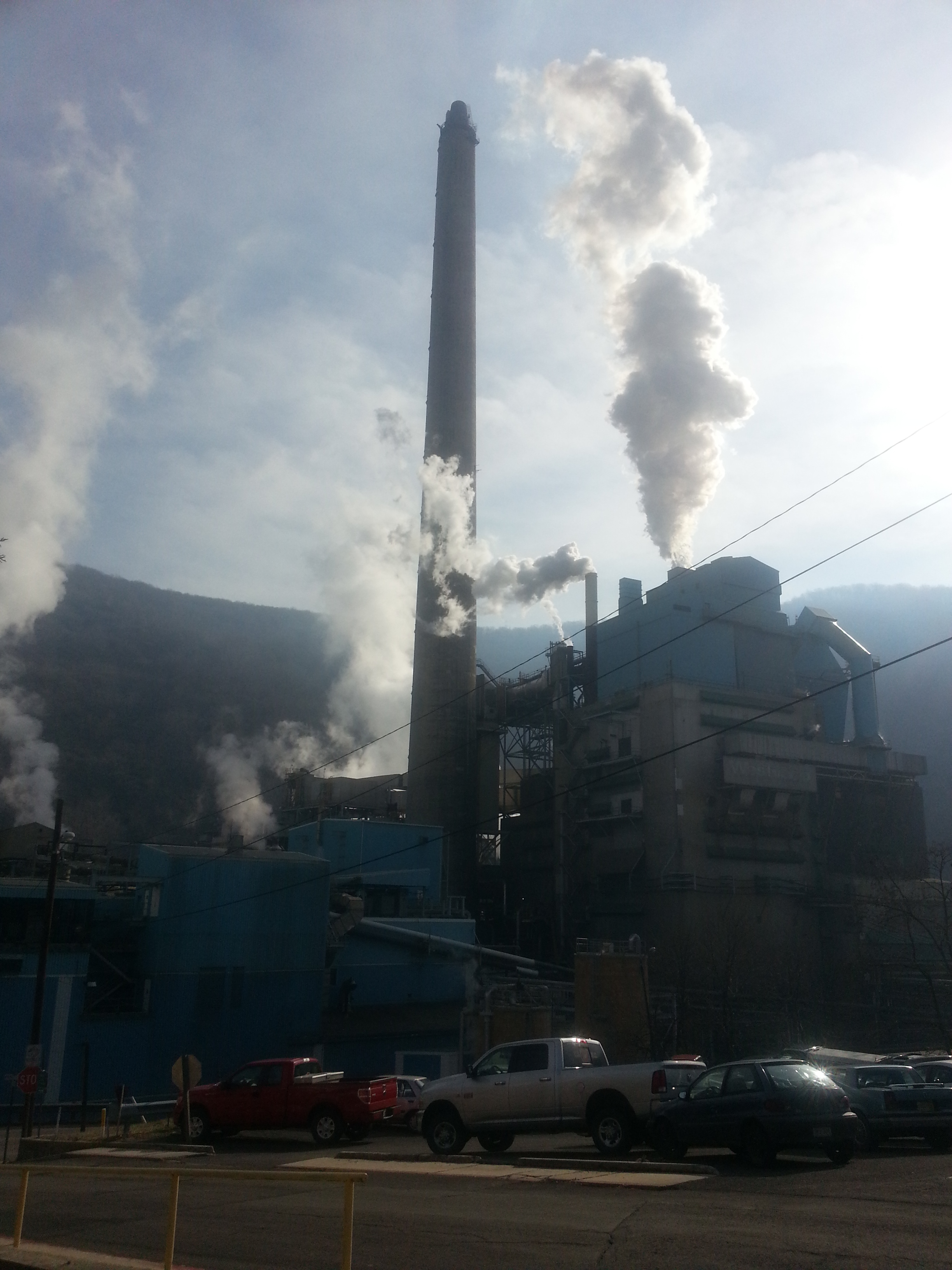
NewPage Corporation facility in January 2014

Located along the Potomac River basin at the foot of Backbone Mountain, Luke was home to a paper mill that was the largest private employer in Allegany County. The mill's owner changed names from the West Virginia Pulp and Paper Company to Westvaco in 1969. Westvaco became Meadwestvaco in January 2002 and its paper business was sold in 2005 to become NewPage. The mill had over a $200 million economic impact on the local economy and supported the coal and rail industry as well as the trucking industry.

The U.S. Environmental Protection Agency listed the paper plant as one of the largest polluters of mercury in Maryland. In 2007, the paper plant voluntarily installed $30 million worth of pollution control equipment to reduce mercury releases. Mercury is a potent neurotoxin. For burning "black liquor", a mix of chemicals and wood waste from the paper-making process, the plant received renewable energy subsidies totalling about $4 million through 2015, thanks to amendments the paper mill owner convinced Maryland lawmakers to adopt in 2004.

In January 2015, Verso Corporation completed acquisition of NewPage, which had owned the Luke paper mill for about ten years. As of December 2017, the Luke mill had about 700 employees.

On April 30, 2019, Verso announced the closing of the Luke paper mill by June 30, 2019, due to various economic factors. One of the reasons cited, a rise in importation, had been fought since at least 2007. Maryland's governor directed the state's labor and commerce departments to do everything possible to help the employees and community. The company said the mill closure would not affect employee pensions, and that their direct employees would receive a severance package. Mayor Clemons, also a local Methodist pastor, organized a nondenominational prayer meeting in mid-May for those affected by the closure, attended by more than 100.

Production at the mill ended on May 31, while employees were paid through June 30, 2019. The Tri-Towns community – consisting of Piedmont in West Virginia, with Luke and Westernport in Maryland – was projected to become devastated by the closure, also to affect suppliers of coal, chemicals, and timber. The mill had supplied Luke with drinking water and paid for most of its wastewater treatment upgrades, both of which had to be reworked. Verso agreed to continue providing water for Luke until a line was extended from Westernport, for which the Maryland Board of Public Works approved more than half a million dollars in August 2020.

In 2019, water analysis by the Upper Potomac Riverkeeper group found toxic substances consistent with black liquor, including arsenic, boron and methyl mercury, originating from the mill; as of October 2019, Maryland environmental officials said they were investigating the leak and taking steps to post advisories nearby. In November 2019, the West Virginia Department of Environmental Protection ordered Verso to empty pulping tanks on West Virginia's side of the river. Saying the company then put the content into tanks in Maryland, and that a black substance continues to seep into the river, Maryland's Department of the Environment filed in February 2020 a notice of intent to sue Verso. The Attorney General of Maryland filed a lawsuit in Allegany County in December 2019 claiming multiple environmental law violations. Maryland had the lead in a federal lawsuit filed in May 2020 against Verso, in which the Potomac Riverkeeper Network participated. Verso settled these lawsuits in April 2021, agreeing to identify the sources and extent of the contamination and create a comprehensive plan to clean it, as well as pay $650,000 to the state of Maryland.

In August 2023, Port River West LLC and JR Vinagro Corporation began to clear up to 55 acres at the former site of the paper mill. As of March 2024, the project is still ongoing with an estimated completion date of summer 2024. No concrete plans have been made regarding the future use of the 55 acres.

== Geography ==
Luke sits on the inside of a bend in the Potomac between Westernport and Bloomington, Maryland. According to the United States Census Bureau, the town has a total area of 0.31 square miles (0.80 km^{2}), of which 0.27 square miles (0.70 km^{2}) is land and 0.04 square miles (0.10 km^{2}) is water.

== Transportation ==
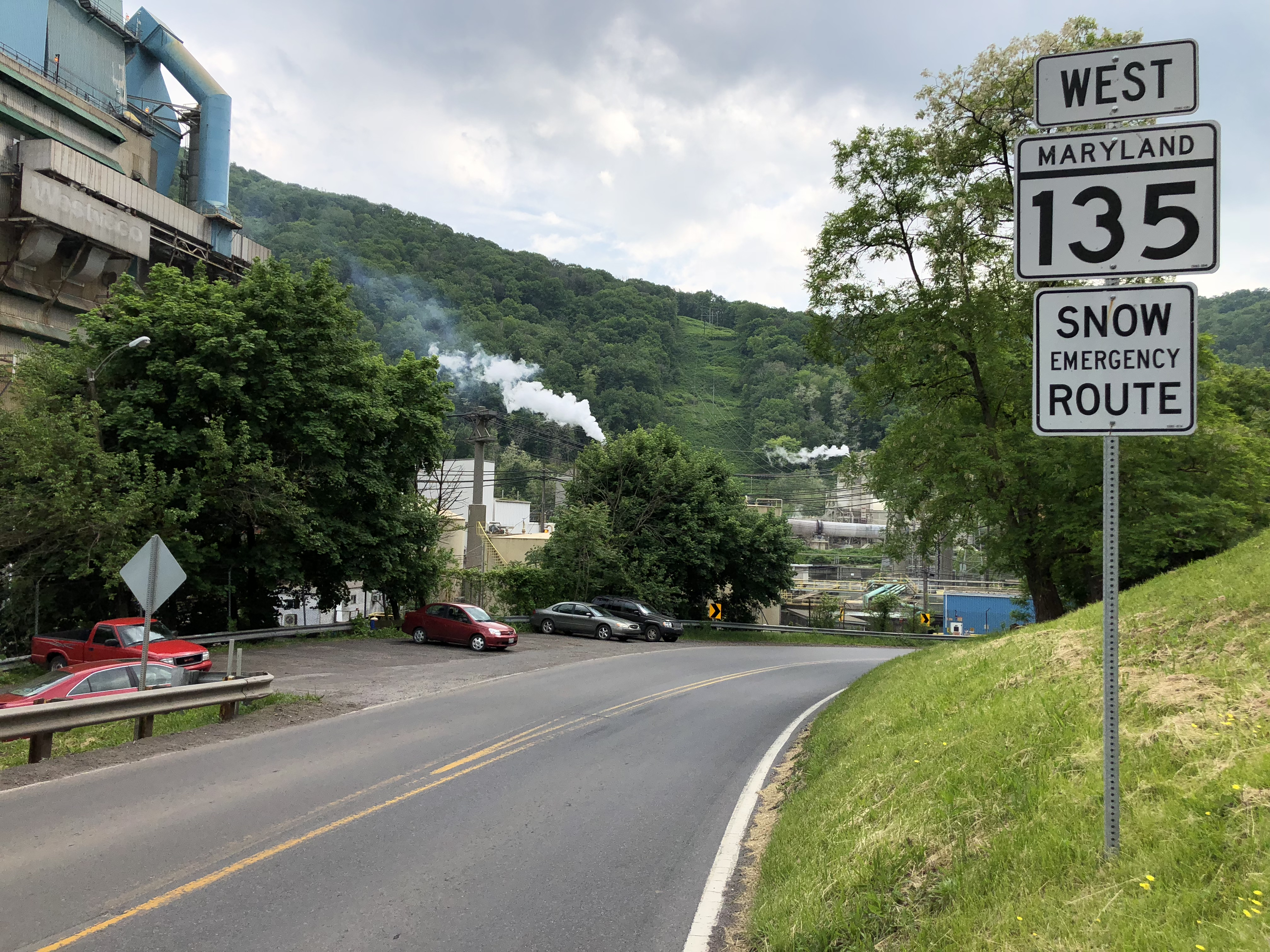
MD 135 westbound in Luke

The primary means of travel to and from Luke are by road. The only state highway serving the town is Pratt Street (Maryland Route 135), which heads eastward to U.S. Route 220 by way of Westernport, and westward to U.S. Route 219 by way of Oakland. A bridge across the North Branch Potomac River connects MD 135 to West Virginia Route 46.

== Government ==
The town of Luke is governed by a mayor and four commissioners who are elected on the second Monday in June in even-numbered years to two-year terms which expire the third Monday in June. Elected officials must have resided in the town for two years before their election and for the duration of their term of office. Town voters must be residents of Luke and registered with the town or Allegany County at least 30 days before the election. The Commission meets at least once a month and its regular meetings are open to the public. In 2020, the election was held in September, with 40 of the town's 52 registered voters submitting ballots. Edward E. Clemons Jr., who served as Luke's mayor from 2010 to 2024, was the longest serving mayor in office in Allegany County. Clemons was elected again in 2026.

Mayors since the town's incorporation include:

- H.W. Best, Sr. (1922–1932)
- O. D. Williams (1932–1938)
- Fred Wiseman (1938–1948)
- Charles S. Dayton (1948–1956)
- J. Edward Duckworth (1956–1964)
- Herman J. Haywood (1964–1966)
- Floyd L. Davis (1966–1978)
- James T. Warnick (1978–1980)
- Overton B. Walker (1980–1982)
- James T. Warnick (1982–1998)
- Joseph W. LaRue (1998–2010)
- Edward E. Clemons Jr. (2010–2024)
- Paula C. Ward (2024–2026)
- Edward E. Clemons, Jr. (2026)

== Demographics ==
Historical population
Census	Pop.	Note	%±
1930	1,064		—
1940	988		−7.1%
1950	820		−17.0%
1960	587		−28.4%
1970	424		−27.8%
1980	329		−22.4%
1990	184		−44.1%
2000	80		−56.5%
2010	65		−18.7%
2020	85		30.8%
U.S. Decennial Census

=== 2010 census ===
As of the census of 2010, there were 65 people, 33 households, and 18 families residing in the town. The population density was 240.7 inhabitants per square mile (92.9/km^{2}). There were 61 housing units at an average density of 225.9 per square mile (87.2/km^{2}). The racial makeup of the town was 100.0% White. Hispanic or Latino of any race were 6.2% of the population.

There were 33 households, of which 15.2% had children under the age of 18 living with them, 39.4% were married couples living together, 12.1% had a female householder with no husband present, 3.0% had a male householder with no wife present, and 45.5% were non-families. 39.4% of all households were made up of individuals, and 27.3% had someone living alone who was 65 years of age or older. The average household size was 1.88 and the average family size was 2.44.

The median age in the town was 48.5 years. 15.4% of residents were under the age of 18; 4.6% were between the ages of 18 and 24; 24.7% were from 25 to 44; 21.6% were from 45 to 64; and 33.8% were 65 years of age or older. The gender makeup of the town was 53.8% male and 46.2% female.

=== 2020 census ===
The 2020 census identified Luke as having a population of 85 people, 84 of whom were White alone, and 1 White and Hispanic/Latino. Housing units numbered 47, with 35 (74.5%) occupied and 12 vacant. 18 residents (21.2%) were under the age of 18.
