= Jefferson Smurfit =

Jefferson Smurfit may refer to:

- Smurfit Kappa, a European corrugated packaging company
- Smurfit-Stone Container, an American-based paperboard and paper-based packaging company
