= NewPage =

Former North American paper producer

- Company type: Information
- Industry: Papermaking
- Founded: 2005
- Fate: Acquired by Verso Corporation (2015)
- Headquarters: Miamisburg, Ohio
- Key people: Mark A. Angelson Chairman; George F. Martin President & CEO; James C. Tyrone EVP, Commercial Operations and Business Development; Jay A. Epstein SVP CFO; Daniel A. Clark SVP & CAO; David L. Santez SVP, General Counsel and Secretary; L. Mark Lukacs SVP, Operations
- Products: Paper
- Website: www.newpagecorp.com

NewPage was a leading producer of printing and specialty papers in North America with $3.1 billion in net sales for the year ended December 31, 2012. NewPage was headquartered in Miamisburg, Ohio, and owned paper mills in Kentucky, Maine, Maryland, Michigan, Minnesota and Wisconsin. These mills have a total annual production capacity of approximately 3.5 million tons of paper.

NewPage's Niagara Mill, located in Niagara, Wisconsin closed in 2008, Kimberly Mill, located in Kimberly, Wisconsin closed in 2009, Chillicothe Mill, located in Chillicothe, Ohio sold in 2006 to Glatfelter and is still operational, Port Hawkesbury Mill, located in Point Tupper, Nova Scotia closed in 2011, re-opened in 2012 by Stern Partners as Port Hawkesbury Paper) and Whiting Mill, located in Whiting, Wisconsin closed in 2011. In 2015, the company was acquired by the Verso Corporation.

== History ==
Two of the mills can trace their roots to the West Virginia Paper Company (aka the West Virginia Pulp & Paper Company and later, Westvaco) that was established in 1888 by William Luke on 50 acres (202,000 m^{2}) of land along the Potomac River in an area known as "West Piedmont" (now Luke, Maryland). The mill in Luke remained a major economic factor in the area straddling the river into Beryl and Piedmont in West Virginia, until it was closed in 2019.

In 2005, MeadWestvaco's Printing and Writing Paper business was sold to investment firm Cerberus Capital Management for about $2.3 billion to form NewPage Corporation. NewPage originally constituted five pulp and paper manufacturing plants in Kentucky, Maine, Maryland, Michigan, and Ohio. In April 2006, NewPage sold their carbonless operations located in Ohio for $84 million to global specialty papermaker P. H. Glatfelter Company, based in York, Pennsylvania. In 2007, NewPage Corporation purchased the North American assets of Stora Enso (formerly Consolidated Papers, Inc.) which included mills in Minnesota, Wisconsin and Nova Scotia.

On September 7, 2011, the NewPage Corporation filed for chapter 11 bankruptcy reorganization due to negative cash flow for more than a year. NewPage Corporation announced December 21, 2012, that it has successfully completed its financial restructuring and has officially emerged from Chapter 11 bankruptcy protection pursuant to its Modified Fourth Amended Chapter 11 Plan which was confirmed on December 14, 2012, by the U.S. Bankruptcy Court for the District of Delaware in Wilmington.

In early 2015, NewPage was acquired by the Verso Corporation for $1.4 billion.
