= WELJ =

- Montauk, New York; United States
- Broadcast area: Eastern Long Island; Southeastern Connecticut
- Frequency: 104.7 MHz
- Branding: 104.7 WELJ

Programming
- Language: English
- Format: Soft adult contemporary

Ownership
- Owner: BOLD Broadcasting, LLC

History
- First air date: February 19, 1993
- Former call signs: WMNK (1988–1993, CP); WBEA (1993–2001); WCSO (May 2001–June 2001); WMOS (2001–2008); WXLM (2008–2010)
- Call sign meaning: Eastern Long Island WPLJ (former parent station)

Technical information
- Licensing authority: FCC
- Facility ID: 7996
- Class: A
- ERP: 6,000 watts
- HAAT: 96 meters (315 ft)
- Transmitter coordinates: 41°1′57.3″N 71°58′29.2″W

Links
- Public license information: Public file; LMS
- Website: www.welj.com

WELJ (104.7 FM) branded as "104.7 WELJ", is a commercial radio station licensed to Montauk, New York, serving Eastern Long Island, and Southeastern Connecticut. It is owned by BOLD Broadcasting and airs a soft adult contemporary radio format.

WELJ has an effective radiated power (ERP) of 6,000 watts. Its transmitter is off Montauk Highway near Lincoln Road in Montauk.

== History ==
=== WBEA, WMOS and WXLM ===
The station first signed on the air on February 19, 1993, as WBEA. It launched with an adult contemporary music format near identical to that which had been heard on WHFM (prior to its change to a relay of WBAB the previous year). However, within a year the format evolved to a hot adult contemporary format with the "Beach Radio" name.

"Beach Radio" saw success in not just targeting Eastern Long Island but also seeking advertisers across Long Island Sound in the New London, Connecticut, market where it delivers a listenable, though not local-quality signal.

When then-WBEA owner AAA Entertainment purchased WBAZ (101.7 FM) and WBSQ (102.5 FM) in 2000, the company began to realign its formats among its signals. After moving WBAZ to WBSQ's signal in May 2001, it was announced that WBEA would move to the former WBAZ frequency at 101.7 MHz with 104.7 becoming a New London rimshot. During the interim period, 104.7 had the temporary WCSO call letters.

In June 2001, AAA entered a deal with the Mohegan Sun casino to program and operate the then-WCSO, with AAA keeping technical operations. With the deal came a new format, classic rock, and the new call sign of WMOS. In 2003, AAA Entertainment sold WMOS and sister WWKX in the Providence market to Citadel Broadcasting.

WXLM "News Talk Sports"

On March 17, 2008, 104.7 and sister station 102.3 made a frequency swap. WXLM and its talk radio format was moved to 104.7, while WMOS and its classic rock format was moved to 102.3.

=== WELJ ===
On September 21, 2010, WXLM changed its call sign to WELJ as part of a pending format change. The WXLM call sign was moved to 980 AM, replacing the historic call sign WSUB. Shortly after, the news/talk format began to simulcast on 980 AM with frequent announcements that WXLM was moving to 980 AM.

On November 3, 2010, WELJ broke away from its simulcast with WXLM and changed its format to hot adult contemporary. Known on-air as "The New 104-7 WELJ", the station promoted 10,000 songs in-a-row, non-stop with zero commercials through the month of November. Although it was anticipated to be a full simulcast of New York City sister station WPLJ, the station had its own identity with local DJs such as Jody, Johnny Mac, Paula Wyn and Joshua Spatafore, though it planned to use WPLJ's "The Big Show with Scott & Todd" (Scott Shannon and Todd Pettingill) as its morning show.

=== Volt Radio ===
Citadel merged with Cumulus Media on September 16, 2011. To comply with Federal Communications Commission ownership restrictions, WELJ had to be spun off by Cumulus Media. It was then transferred to Volt Radio, LLC.

On November 3, 2014, WELJ dropped its hot AC format and flipped back to a simulcast, this time of WNSH in Newark, New Jersey, which carried a country music format as "Nash FM 94.7", with the simulcast only being noted in station identifications. On August 31, 2015, WELJ dropped its simulcast with WNSH and rebranded as "104.7 Nash Icon".

=== Soft AC ===
On July 19, 2016, Joule Broadcasting announced that WELJ would be sold to BOLD Broadcasting, LLC The station was purchased by two college students, Matthew Glaser and Andrew Adams, who were said to be the youngest station owners in the country. The sale was completed on November 1, 2016. At that time, WELJ switched to Christmas music and announced that a new format would launch on December 26 at noon.

At the promised time, WELJ launched a soft adult contemporary and oldies format as "104.7 WELJ". The first song under the new format was "Easy" by The Commodores.
