= WBAZ =

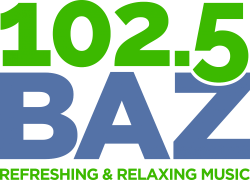

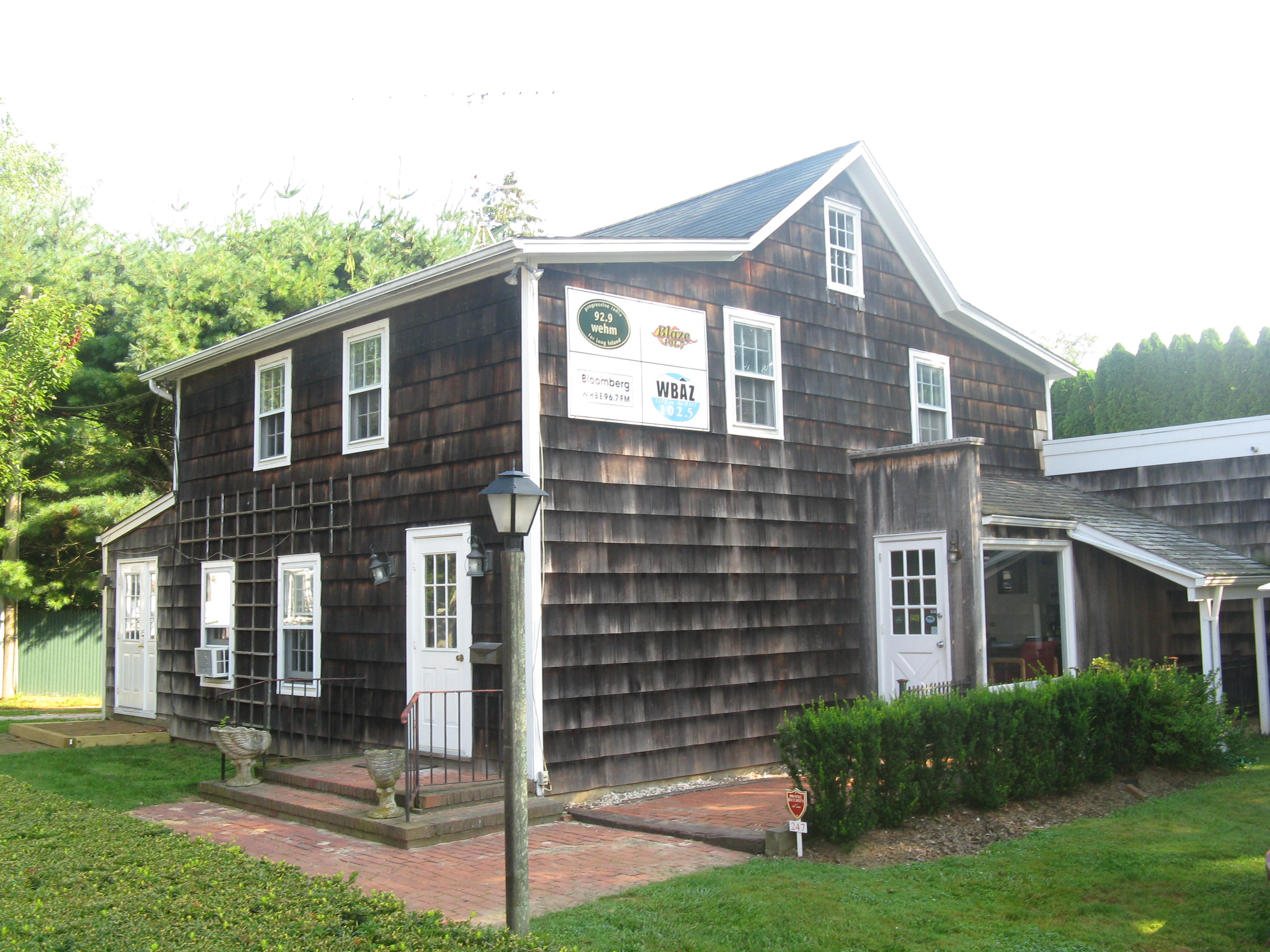
- Former studios in Amagansett
- Bridgehampton, New York; United States
- Broadcast area: Eastern Long Island; Southeastern Connecticut
- Frequency: 102.5 MHz
- Branding: 102.5 BAZ

Programming
- Format: Adult contemporary music

Ownership
- Owner: Lauren Roger Stone; (LRS Radio, LLC)
- Sister stations: WBEA; WEHM; WEHN

History
- First air date: April 1996
- Former call signs: WAFV (1993–1994); WLIE (1994–1998); WBSQ (1998–2001); WCSO (2001)
- Call sign meaning: "Bays"

Technical information
- Licensing authority: FCC
- Facility ID: 52061
- Class: A
- ERP: 4,800 watts
- HAAT: 106 meters (348 ft)
- Transmitter coordinates: 40°53′58.3″N 72°23′4.3″W

Links
- Public license information: Public file; LMS
- Webcast: Listen live
- Website: www.wbaz.com

WBAZ (102.5 FM) is an adult contemporary music formatted radio station licensed to serve Bridgehampton, New York, and covering eastern Long Island and Southeastern Connecticut. The station is owned by WEHM on-air talent Lauren Stone (68.8%) and her father Roger W. Stone (31.2%), the chairman/CEO of Kapstone Paper & Packaging Company in Northbrook, Illinois, as licensee LRS Radio, LLC. The station's studios are located in Water Mill, New York, and shared by WBEA and WEHM/WEHN. WBAZ's transmitter is located in Southampton, New York.

== History ==
The 102.5 frequency first signed on in April 1996 as WLIE, with a satellite-fed country music format. Put on the air by WBAZ (101.7 FM) owner Mel Kahn and his MAK Communications, less than a year later, the country format was replaced with classic rock.

In early 1998, the 102.5 frequency changed again as it took on new calls, WBSQ, and a new hot adult contemporary format (again satellite-fed) as Q-(Bright)102.5. Launched as a complement to WBAZ and not much else, the station remained an afterthought in the scheme of East End radio.

When Kahn sold WBAZ and WBSQ to AAA Entertainment, owner of locally-run rival WBEA (104.7 FM) in 2000, the future of WBSQ's hot AC format was limited. Studies by AAA showed that the majority of WBAZ's listeners were concentrated in the Southampton/Bridgehampton area and that the slightly worse 102.5 FM signal would be ideal for the station. In April 2001, WBSQ took the WCSO calls used by AAA as placeholders and would simulcast and assume WBAZ's format and calls that May. The 101.7 frequency soon became home to WBEA whereas WBEA's former home at 104.7 FM became home to a classic hits station targeted to New London, Connecticut.

In 2005, WBAZ, WBEA, and sister stations WEHM and WHBE would be purchased by Long Island Radio Broadcasting, a unit of Cherry Creek Radio.
