= WBEA =

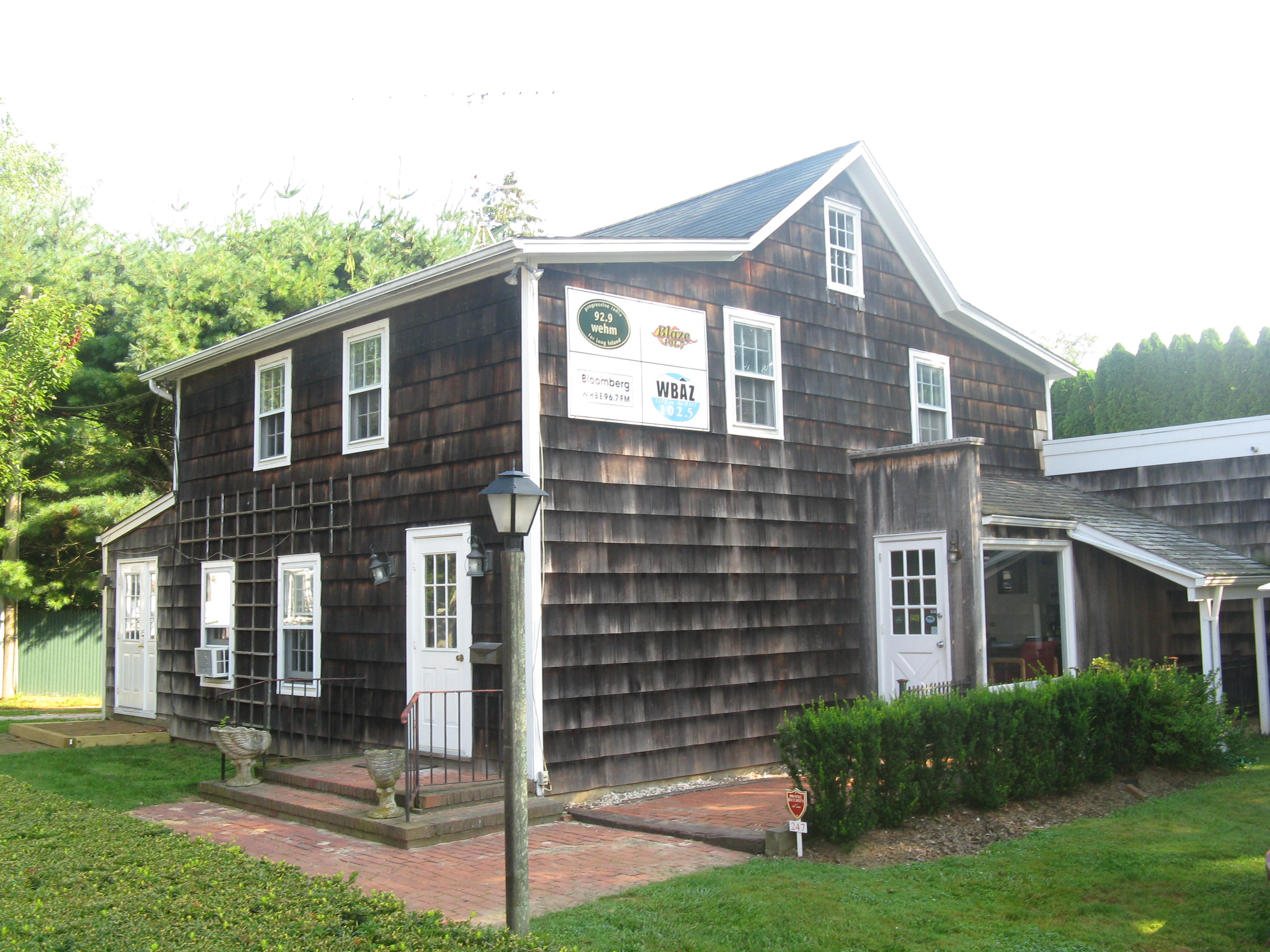
- Former studios in Amagansett
- Southold, New York; United States
- Broadcast area: Eastern Long Island
- Frequency: 101.7 MHz
- Branding: 101-7 The Beach

Programming
- Language: English
- Format: Mainstream Top 40

Ownership
- Owner: Lauren Roger Stone; (LRS Radio, LLC)
- Sister stations: WBAZ; WEHM; WEHN

History
- First air date: July 3, 1985
- Former call signs: WBAZ (1985–2001); WCSO (2001)
- Call sign meaning: Beach or Beat

Technical information
- Licensing authority: FCC
- Facility ID: 52060
- Class: A
- ERP: 6,000 watts
- HAAT: 86.4 meters (283 ft)
- Transmitter coordinates: 40°52′10.4″N 72°34′35.3″W

Links
- Public license information: Public file; LMS
- Webcast: Listen live (via TuneIn)
- Website: beachradio1017.com

WBEA (101.7 FM, "101-7 THE BEACH") is a mainstream top 40 radio station licensed to serve Southold, New York, and covering eastern Long Island. The station is licensed to LRS Radio, LLC, which is owned by WEHM on-air talent Lauren Stone (68.8%) and her father Roger W. Stone (31.2%), the chairman/CEO of Kapstone Paper & Packaging Company in Northbrook, Illinois. Its transmitter is located in East Quogue, New York.

The station broadcasts from studios in Water Mill, New York, shared by WBAZ, WEHM and WEHN.

== History ==
WBEA first signed on the air July 3, 1985, as WBAZ. The station was founded by broadcasting consultant Joe Sullivan, Jr. doing business as Peconic Bay Broadcasting Company.

WBAZ would for many years feature an adult contemporary format known as Lighting up the Bays (or Z-Light on the Bays) which for most of its existence was satellite-fed through Transtar's (later Westwood One) "Special Blend" format. Sullivan later sold WBAZ to Mel Kahn in the late 1990s, along with then-sister station WLIE-FM.

When Kahn sold WBAZ and sister WBSQ to AAA Entertainment in 2000, the group would soon undergo a realignment given that AAA's WBEA and Kahn's WBSQ were competitors with different varieties of the hot adult contemporary format. With WBEA, then at 104.7 MHz, outperforming WBSQ with a poorer signal, the decision was made to move WBAZ to WBSQ's 102.5 MHz location while moving WBEA to WBAZ's 101.7 MHz frequency. WBAZ and WBSQ would simulcast for most of May 2001 with the 101.7 frequency gaining the temporary WCSO calls in the process. After this period, the WBEA format was simulcast on 101.7 and 104.7 with 101.7 gaining the WBEA calls and Beach Radio format that June. At that time, 104.7 would enter a deal with the Mohegan Sun casino and become a cross-Sound rimshot into New London, Connecticut.

After the frequency switch, WBEA would soon shift in more of a CHR direction, putting it in competition with the high-rated WBLI and Connecticut rimshot WKCI. The station initially did well with its new approach, however a change in market dynamic after Arbitron made the East End of Long Island a rated market doomed the surprisingly low-rated Beach Radio format. At the end of 2004, WBEA would flip to a hip hop format as Blaze 101.7, the first such station on Long Island. After AAA Entertainment sold their stations to Long Island Radio Broadcasting (a division of Cherry Creek Radio) took control of the stations later that year, the station would evolve to rhythmic contemporary and would take on the new name The Beat, then reverting to "The Beach" during the summer of 2007.

On May 22, 2008, and after spending four years as a rhythmic, WBEA returned to a Top 40/CHR direction, thus once again putting the station back in competition with WBLI and WKCI and as a result left WDRE (now WPTY) as the market's lone rhythmic outlet.
