= Maryland Steamer =

Automobile manufactured in Luke, Maryland, U.S.

The Maryland Steamer automobile was manufactured in Luke, Maryland in 1900 and 1901

== History ==
The Maryland Automobile Manufacturing company developed a runabout with a two-cylinder vertical steam engine and a chain drive. In December 1900 the factory was blown down by gale-force winds. The factory was insured and production continued in 1901. The Company offered bodies as a Tourist Carriage, Runabout, Surrey, Phaeton, Omnibus, Delivery Wagon and Racing Machine. The company was reported in receivership by May 1901. The factory became a bottling plant.
