= Billerud =

Swedish paper and pulp company

Billerud AB
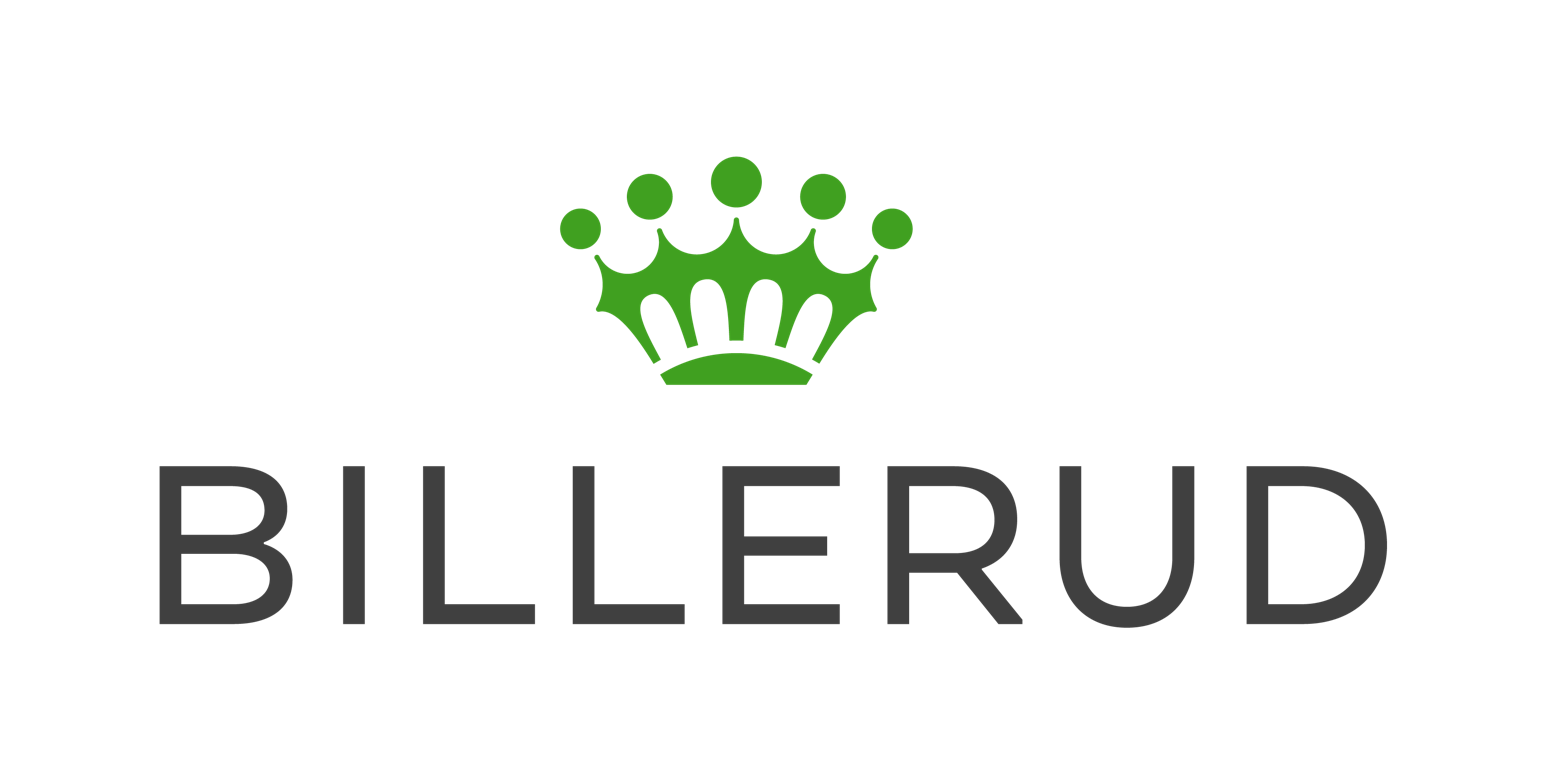
- Type: Publicly traded Aktiebolag
- Traded as: Nasdaq Stockholm: BILL
- Industry: Paper and forest products
- Founded: 29 November 2012
- Headquarters: Solna, Sweden,
- Key people: Jan Svensson(Chairman); Ivar Vatne(CEO)
- Products: Liquid packaging board, Containerboard, Cartonboard, Formable paper, Fluting and liner, Kraft paper, Sack paper, Graphic paper, Speciality paper
- Revenue: SEK 43.453 billion (2024)
- Operating income: SEK 2.561 billion (2024)
- Net income: SEK 1.747 billion (2024)
- Total assets: SEK 50.229 billion (2024)
- Total equity: SEK 28.979 billion (2024)
- Number of employees: ≈5 900 (2024)
- Website: www.billerud.com

Billerud AB is a Swedish pulp and paper manufacturer with headquarters in Solna, Sweden. The company simplified its name from BillerudKorsnäs to Billerud after the acquisition of Verso 2022, an American producer of coated paper. Billerud has nine production facilities in Sweden, Finland and the USA with around 5,800 employees in over 13 countries.

Its production units are located in Grums, Skärblacka, Frövi/Rockhammar, Gävle and Karlsborg in Sweden, Jakobstad in Finland, Escanaba, Quinnesec and Wisconsin Rapids in the US. The company's product portfolio includes liquid packaging board, cartonboard, containerboard, sack paper, kraft and specialty papers, graphic paper, and market pulp.

== History ==
The company was formed in November 2012 through the merger of Billerud AB and Korsnäs AB.

In the 2012 merger, Billerud was the formal buyer. Korsnäs' owner, Investment Kinnevik AB, received a sum of SEK 3.2 billion as well as 25.1% of the votes in the new company and consequently became the largest owner in the merged BillerudKorsnäs. Behind the merger, was an ambition to become an internationally leading packaging manufacturer.

During the same year, BillerudKorsnäs acquired paper production facilities both in Jakobstad and Tervasaari, Valkeakoski, in Finland from UPM Kymmene. Valkeakoski was closed down and the paper machine for MG paper was moved to Skärblacka mill in 2017.

In 2013, Kinnevik sold its shares in BillerudKorsnäs to pension firms AMF, Alecta and the Fourth Swedish National Pension Fund.

In March 2022, BillerudKorsnäs completed its acquisition of the US-based coated paper company, Verso Corporation for $825m in cash. As a result of the acquisition, according to a press release in October 2022, the company changed its name from BillerudKorsnäs to Billerud "to cater to its international customers".

== Production units ==
Billerud operates nine production units across Sweden, the United States, and Finland, each specializing in various paper and packaging materials.

=== In Sweden ===
- Gruvön Mill – produces fluting, liners, liquid packaging board and pulp.
- Skärblacka Mill – produces white machine glazed kraft paper, brown sack paper, fluting and pulp.
- Karlsborg Mill – produces kraft paper, sack paper, formable paper (FibreForm®) and pulp
- Frövi Mill – produces cartonboard and liquid packaging board
- Gävle Mill – produces liquid packaging board and liners.

=== In the US ===
- Escanaba Mill – produces graphic papers used in commercial printing, media and marketing.
- Quinnesec Mill – produces graphic papers used in commercial printing, media and marketing, and pulp.
- Wisconsin Rapids Converting Facility – converts cartonboard and rolls of paper into sheets.

=== In Finland ===
- Jakobstad Mill – produces formable paper (FibreForm®), kraft- and sack paper for food packaging and carrier bags.

== Regions and segments ==
Billerud's organization is structured through the regions Europe and North America.

In 2024, region Europe corresponds to 65% of the group's net sales, while region North America corresponds to 28%.

== Corporate leadership ==
=== Chairmen of the Board ===
- Hannu Ryöppönen, 2012–2014
- Lennart Holm, 2014–2019
- Jan Åström 2019-2021
- Jan Svensson 2021-

=== Chief Executive Officer ===
- Per Lindberg, 2012–2017
- Petra Einarsson, 2018–2019
- Lennart Holm, 2019-2020 (acting CEO)
- Christoph Michalski, 2020-2023
- Ivar Vatne, 2023-

== Ownership structure ==
The largest shareholders are AMF Pension & Funds with 15.62 percent of the votes and Frapag Beteiligungholding AG with 12.06 percent (as of December 31, 2024).

== See also ==
- Holmen
- Stora Enso
- Svenska Cellulosa Aktiebolaget
- UPM (company)
