= Fold-Pak =

Company that manufactures containers for take-out food

Fold-Pak, formerly Bloomer Brothers of Newark, NY, is a division of WestRock with three production facilities: Hazleton, PA, Fresno, CA, and Lebanon, TN. The company manufactures containers for take-out food under the Fold-Pak, Bio-Pak, Bio-Plus, and SmartServ product lines.

The containers come in a variety of sizes and designs, some of which can be stored flat and set up when needed, and others which are ready for use. They are lightweight, made primarily of coated cardboard to resist grease and liquids.
