= RockTenn =

Former American paper and packaging manufacturer

- Industry: Paper and Packaging
- Founded: 1973
- Founder: Arthur Newth Morris Sr.
- Defunct: 2015
- Fate: merged with MeadWestvaco
- Successor: WestRock
- Headquarters: Norcross, Georgia, United States
- Key people: Steven Voorhees, CEO
- Revenue: $9.895 Billion (2014)
- Operating income: $854.4 Million (2014)
- Net income: $483.8 Million (2014)
- Number of employees: 26,000
- Website: www.rocktenn.com

RockTenn was an American paper and packaging manufacturer based in Norcross, Georgia. In 2015, it merged with MeadWestvaco to form the WestRock company.

It was one of North America's leading producers of corrugated and consumer packaging and recycling solutions, with annualized net sales of approximately $10 billion. The company employed approximately 26,000 people and operated more than 245 facilities in the United States, Canada, Mexico, Chile, Argentina and China.

== Company history ==
RockTenn Company was formed in 1973, the product of a merger between Tennessee Paper Mills Inc. and Rock City Packaging, Inc. Its origins date back to 1898, when the Rock City Box Company of Nashville, Tennessee, was founded. Among its customers in the mid-1940s were a local boot factory, a local candy manufacturer, a hosiery company, and several shirt manufacturers. The owners, Joe McHenry and A.E. Saxon, who also operated several other business ventures, wanted to sell out and retire. Rock City was attractive to Arthur Newth Morris, owner of the Southern Box Company, not least for its bank account of $60,000. Morris purchased the company in 1944 for $200,000, making a cash down payment of $50,000.

The 25-year-old Morris had been a printer and part-time Presbyterian minister when he went to work in 1926 for Edwin J. Schoettle, a Philadelphia, Pennsylvania, industrialist who owned a group of box and printing companies that bore his name. For a monthly salary of $350 Morris was expected to manage several hundred employees, some of them more than twice his age. He also traveled along the eastern seaboard, explaining to meat packers his discovery that they could avoid shrinkage of their hot dogs by putting them in Schoettle's boxes instead of stringing them up like bananas.

By 1935, Morris was making a salary on which he could comfortably support his wife and four children, but he wanted to go into business for himself. Armed with life savings of $5,000 and a $7,500 investment by his boss, he moved to Baltimore, Maryland. There he managed the J.E. Smith Box & Printing Co. during the day, while running the Southern Box Company, a company he founded in 1936, at night. Using Smith's presses, die-cutters, and other box making equipment during the evening, Morris began servicing two anchor customers who knew him from his Philadelphia days.

Only six months after Morris had left Philadelphia, Schoettle came to Baltimore to offer him a promotion and a $25,000 salary. When Morris refused, Schoettle offered to sell Morris his own majority share of Southern Box for $25,000. A bank loan to Morris made the deal possible. He moved to new quarters for $200 a month, left day-to-day management to one of his employees, and devoted himself to finding new accounts. In its first year the company made a few thousand dollars on sales of $60,000.

By 1942, Morris was doing well enough to open a corrugated box plant and to buy another Baltimore enterprise, the King Folding Box Co., where he installed a corrugated sheet cutter. Morris sold corrugated partitions to major glass companies, which needed them to separate the bottles and glasses they shipped. The following year the name of his enterprise was changed to Newth Morris Box Company. In 1944, another branch was opened in Jacksonville, Florida, where the company produced cardboard anti-radar devices for World War II American troops and popcorn boxes for movie theater owners. Following Morris's purchase of Rock City Box Co. that same year, he changed the name of Newth Morris Box Co. to Rock City Box Sales Company.

Morris's purchase of Rock City Box Co. put him in contact with one of its suppliers and his future merger partner: Tennessee Paper Mills. Andrew M. Tomlinson and John Stagmaier, two of Tennessee Paper's three founders, were Athens, Tennessee, businessmen who already owned box factories. The company's third founder was A.M. Sheperd of Vincennes, Indiana, a boxboard manufacturer. Tennessee Paper Mills was incorporated in 1917 with Stagmaier as president, Tomlinson as vice-president, and Sheperd as general manager. With $300,000 raised from stock offerings, the three men established a paperboard factory in Chattanooga, where operation began in July 1918. By the end of the year the new company had made a net profit of $23,367 on sales of $165,799.

Although the founders originally planned to make board from wheat straw, they turned instead to wastepaper as the primary raw material; thus Tennessee Paper became the first recycled paperboard mill in the South. To reduce its electric bill, the company installed its own steam generating plant in 1926. Paperboard production averaged 20 tons a day in the early years, reaching an average of 56.77 tons in 1930, the same year that the company produced a record 15,557 tons of product. This figure would not be matched for some time because of the Great Depression; production dropped to 11,995 tons in 1934. The company remained profitable, however, although only modestly so. As the nation's economy slowly recovered, Tennessee Paper's volume of business increased to meet renewed demand. During 1939 the factory operated at 85 percent capacity, compared with the industry average of 71 percent. In 1941, it operated a record 305 days. Sales volume exceeded $1.7 million in 1945. A second papermaking machine doubled the mill's capacity in 1949.

Beginning in 1954, however, Tennessee Paper began losing customers to companies manufacturing lower-cost folding cartons and corrugated and plastic containers. The trend in the business was toward vertical integration. Many paperboard companies acquired – or merged with – their customers. Typically profits were made at the mill level, by selling boxes virtually at cost. The effect on boxmakers was so severe that by 1957 Tennessee Paper was extending credit and loans to its customers in order to keep their accounts.

One of these customers was Rock City. Its consumption of Tennessee Paper's board grew from about 1,000 tons in 1944 to about 37,000 tons in 1972, when it took 44 percent of Tennessee Paper's total boxboard production. Between 1965 and 1968 Tennessee Paper bought 29.5 percent of Rock City's common stock, preparing the way for the eventual merger of the two companies. By then Rock City owed Tennessee Paper more than $4 million in loans.

Morris's burgeoning industrial empire grew both by acquisitions and by establishing new companies. Among the former was the Parks Box & Printing Co., located on a leased 11-acre tract in Norcross, Georgia. This land was purchased in 1957 and gradually became the focal point for management of all the Morris companies. A new 30,000-square-foot warehouse was added to the Norcross facility in 1960.

Each of the Morris companies operated as a separate and virtually autonomous profit center. Rock City opened not only small set-up and folding carton plants but also facilities in Livingston and Milan, Tennessee, to meet the packaging needs of shirtmakers. A set-up box division was established in 1955. Rock City Waste Paper Co. collected, sorted, and baled wastepaper for sale to paper mills. Other Morris companies and plants sprouted throughout the South. Sales grew from $8 million in 1959 to $12.9 million in 1967, when all the companies were consolidated into Rock City Packaging, Inc. Morris became chairman of the board and a son-in-law, Worley Brown, became president. Sales volume reached $23 million in 1972.

Meanwhile, in order to meet the competition, Tennessee Paper began buying customers to assure continued markets for its paperboard products. In 1964, it acquired Knoxville Paper Box Co., Inc., a manufacturer of folding and set-up boxes, for about $1 million. In 1969, Tennessee Paper acquired wastepaper factories in Knoxville and Atlanta, and in 1972 it built another wastepaper plant in Chattanooga.

=== Formation of RockTenn in 1973 ===
The merger of Rock City Packaging and Tennessee Paper Mills in 1973 gave Morris, Brown, and others who held stock in the former companies a controlling interest in the new corporation, RockTenn Company. Most Tennessee Paper common stockholders received preferred stock in the new company that earned them triple the dividends they had been receiving. Some shareholders, however, opted for cash instead. The president of Tennessee Paper, W. Max Finley, and his immediate family, received common stock in the new company. Finley was elected chairman of the board and Brown became president and chief executive officer.

Reorganization did nothing to slow down expansion. The Crescent Box & Printing Co. of Tullahoma, Tennessee, was acquired in 1973 and Clevepak Corporation's Conway, Arkansas, folding carton plant in 1974. By 1976 the company had 29 divisions. Sales in 1974, the first fiscal year after the merger, reached $47.7 million. In 1978 Bradley Currey, Jr., a veteran officer of the Trust Company of Georgia who had helped effect the merger, became president and chief operating officer of RockTenn. Brown became chairman of the board while remaining chief executive officer. Finley moved to senior chairman of the board. Morris remained chairman of the executive committee until his death in January 1985. Currey later became RockTenn's chairman (in 1993) and CEO (in 1989) as well as its president.

=== Acquisition-fueled growth in the 1980s and 1990s ===
In 1982 RockTenn's sales volume reached $133 million and its production of recycled paperboard peaked at 180,000 tons, most of which it used itself in the manufacture of folding cartons and containers and corrugated boxes. Its many customers included Coca-Cola, DuPont and Kentucky Fried Chicken, which it serviced from facilities in Alabama, Arkansas, Georgia, Maryland, Massachusetts, North Carolina, Ohio, Tennessee, and Texas with a workforce of 1,700 people. In a 1983 Atlanta Constitution interview, Currey attributed the decade-old company's growth to "luck, chance, and circumstance ... but the success of any company depends on its people." He added that the company had gone to great lengths "to make sure the workers know that we care" – a group of senior executives took a month each year to travel to each of the company's facilities in order to talk to employees and present service awards.

RockTenn made its biggest acquisition yet in 1983, when it paid $40 million to buy 11 Clevepak Corporation plants, seven of which were making partitions to protect glass and plastic containers. Currey said the acquisition would allow RockTenn to capture about one-fourth of the partition market, raise annual revenue to more than $200 million, and increase production of recycled paperboard to 235,000 tons. In 1989, net sales had reached $515.9 million, and net income was $31.1 million. The following year the company dedicated to Chairman of the Board Finley a 33,000-square-foot office building behind its headquarters in Norcross.

In 1990, RockTenn acquired Allforms Packaging Corp. of Long Island, New York, and Box Innards Inc. of Orange, California. The next year it purchased the former Specialty Paperboard Inc. mill in Sheldon Springs, Vermont, and Ellis Paperboard Products Inc. of Scarborough, Maine, a manufacturer of folding cartons and solid-fiber partitions. The Ellis purchase included its Canadian subsidiary, Dominion Paperboard Products Ltd. With these additions RockTenn controlled 60 manufacturing and distribution operations, including eight mills with a total annual production capacity of 607,000 tons of recycled paperboard products. RockTenn now ranked sixth among U.S. producers of recycled paperboard, with market share of 5.7 percent.

Net sales rose from $564.1 million in 1991, ending September 30, 1991, to $655.5 million in 1992, but dipped to $650.7 million in 1993. Net income rose from $25 million in 1991 to $33.2 million in 1992 before dipping to $25.5 million in 1993. The 1993 figure included unusual after-tax expenses of $5.8 million. Production in 1994 was 700,000 tons of recycled paperboard, of which 182,000 tons was clay-coated recycled paperboard.

The first public offering of RockTenn stock, amounting to about 14 percent of the shares outstanding, was made in March 1994. A handful of shareholders offered about 3.6 million shares of Class A common stock, while the company itself offered about 900,000 shares. An analysis in Barron's described RockTenn's balance sheet as "attractive" and said the company was "more soundly financed than many in its field," noting that long-term debt of $51.6 million was only one year's cash flow. Although calling the offering somewhat pricey at $16.50 a share, it noted that "RockTenn's emphasis on recycling makes it well-suited to customers wishing to appear environmentally responsible, and could also prove profitable if use of woodlands is restricted." Officers and directors of RockTenn still controlled about 71 percent of the combined voting power of Class A and B common stock after the offering.

In December 1993, RockTenn paid $35 million for Les Industries Ling, a Canadian company that used recycled paperboard to make folding cartons. The newly acquired plant, which was to serve as the principal supplier of recycled clay-coated paperboard for RockTenn's Vermont mill, became the company's second largest folding carton facility. A year later, RockTenn agreed to acquire Olympic Packaging, an Illinois-based manufacturer of folding cartons, and Alliance Display and Packaging Co. of Winston-Salem, North Carolina, maker of corrugated displays. The purchases, which boosted RockTenn's acquisitions of manufacturing operations to 17 in a decade, cost about $75 million.

By the middle of the 1990s, RockTenn had 59 facilities in 19 states and Canada. Net sales reached $705.8 million during 1994, constituting an 11.8 percent compounded annual growth rate for the past decade. Net income came to a record $37.5 million. Late in 1995 COO Jay Shuster was named president of RockTenn, with Currey retaining the posts of chairman and CEO.

In January 1997, RockTenn consummated the largest acquisition in its history, purchasing Waldorf Corporation for $239 million in cash and the assumption of $170 million in debt. Based in St. Paul, Minnesota, Waldorf operated six folding carton plants and three paperboard mills in Illinois, Massachusetts, Michigan, Minnesota, North Carolina and Wisconsin; the firm had revenues of $377 million during 1996. The acquisition propelled RockTenn into the number two position among producers of folding cartons in North America and also made the company the leading manufacturer of recycled paperboard in the United States. RockTenn followed up with two smaller deals in mid-1997, adding Wright City, Missouri-based Rite Paper Products, Inc., a producer of laminated recycled paperboard products primarily for the furniture industry, and the Davey Company, a manufacturer of high-density recycled paperboard mainly used in book covers and binders that operated mills in Aurora, Illinois; and Jersey City, New Jersey. Also in 1997, RockTenn and Sonoco Products Company created a fiber partition joint venture called RTS Packaging, LLC, with RockTenn holding a 65 percent stake and Sonoco the remaining 35 percent. The venture combined RockTenn's eight partition plants with the seven that had been owned by Sonoco.

Although the purchase of Waldorf pushed RockTenn's revenues past the $1 billion mark for the first time in 1997, difficulties in the integration process resulted in a depressed profit figure of $16.1 million. Some of the profit shortfall was attributable to costs stemming from plant closings, and the company closed additional plants in the next two fiscal years as profit levels recovered somewhat.

=== Increasing focus on packaging and merchandising displays: early 2000s ===
In October 1999, RockTenn went outside its ranks for a new CEO, hiring James A. Rubright, who had previously been the head of the pipeline group and energy services business of Sonat, Inc. Currey handed over the chairmanship to Rubright as well in January 2000. Later in 2000, Shuster, having been passed over for the CEO position, left the company. Rubright accelerated the pace of restructuring at RockTenn through the closure of a number of under-performing plants. He also shifted the company's emphasis away from the slow-growing recycled paperboard side and toward the areas with higher growth potential: the folding carton and plastics packaging businesses, as well as the burgeoning merchandising display operation, which by the early 2000s was the U.S. leader in point-of-purchase displays.

During 2000, RockTenn closed one laminated-paperboard products plant and three folding carton plants, resulting in 550 employee terminations and charges of $61.1 million – and a net loss for the year of $15.9 million. Seven more plants were closed over the next three years, resulting in the loss of 450 more jobs and an additional $19 million in charges.

Meantime, in February 2000 the company formed a joint venture with Lafarge Corporation called Seven Hills Paperboard, LLC, which was charged with producing gypsum paperboard liner for the U.S. drywall manufacturing plants of Lafarge. RockTenn owned 49 percent of the venture. RockTenn also beefed up its merchandising display business, its fastest-growing segment, through two acquisitions costing a total of $25.4 million.

In November 2001, Advertising Display Company, a producer of both temporary and permanent point-of-purchase displays, was acquired. In March of the following year RockTenn bought Athena Industries, Inc., a Burr Ridge, Illinois, manufacturer of permanent point-of-purchase displays, with an emphasis on wire displays.

On December 20, 2001, RockTenn Company announced revised historical segment operating income results, because it had changed its presentation of certain segment operating income data for fiscal 2002.

Acquisition activity continued in 2003 with the purchase of Cartem Wilco Group Inc., a privately held Canadian maker of folding cartons and specialty packaging, for $65.3 million. The deal accelerated RockTenn's expansion into the growing pharmaceutical and health and beauty packaging market. Cartem Wilco, which operated plants in Montreal and Quebec City, also produced folding cartons for food packaging and consumer products. In August 2003 RockTenn paid about $16 million for Pacific Coast Packaging Corp., located in Kerman, California. RockTenn secured its first folding carton operation on the West Coast through this acquisition, gaining a manufacturer of folding cartons for the fast-food, in-store deli, and gift box markets.

=== Smurfit-Stone acquisition ===
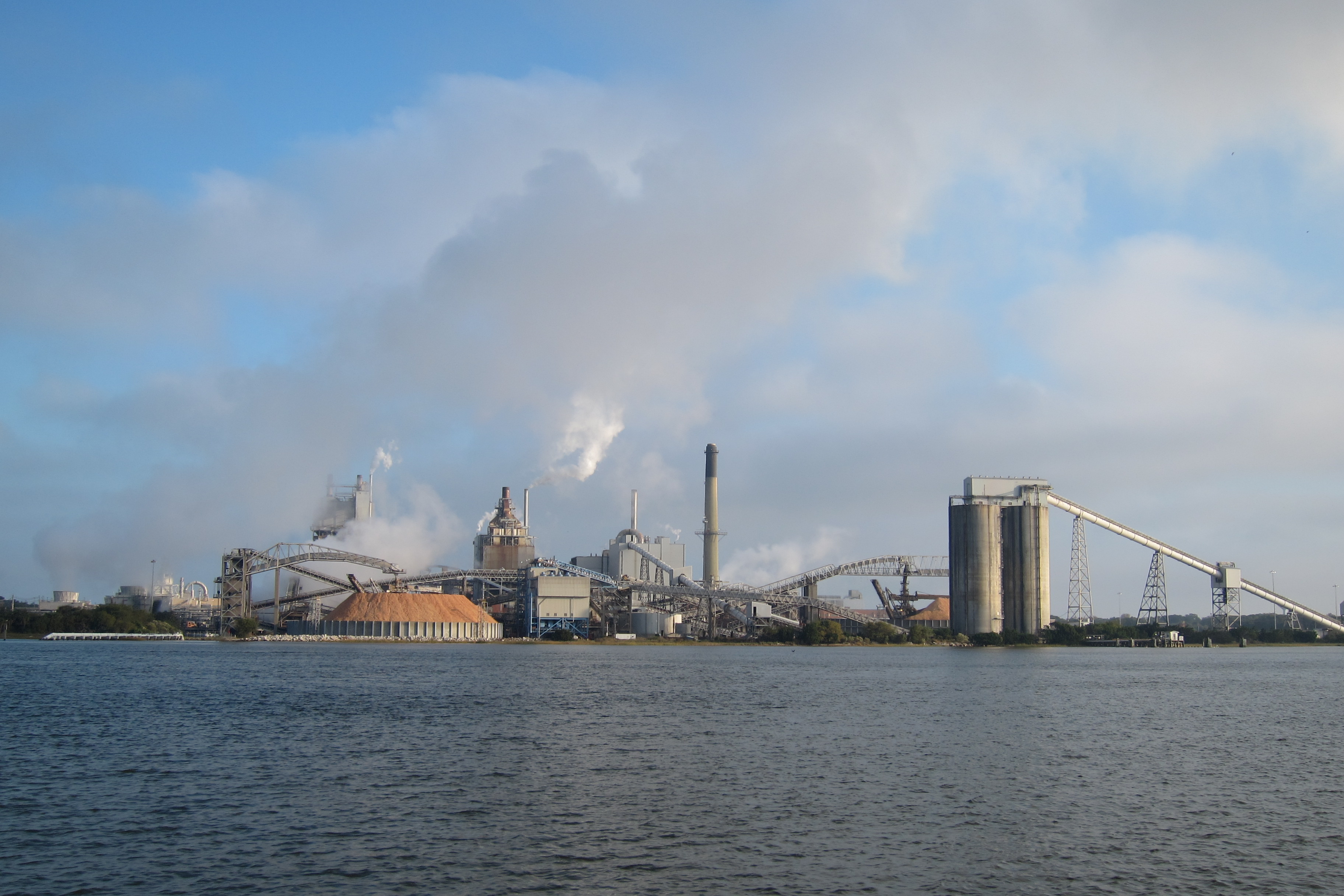
Smurfit-Stone factory acquired by RockTenn in Fernandina Beach

In 2010–2011, RockTenn made a successful bid for Smurfit-Stone Container, the world's-largest producer and recycler of paperboard. The acquisition deal closed in May 2011, making the combined company North America's second largest producer of containerboard.

=== MeadWestvaco acquisition ===
Rock-Tenn Co. agreed to acquire U.S. rival MeadWestvaco Corp. in a deal valued at about $9.2 billion to create the world’s second-largest packaging company.

== See also ==
- Fold-Pak
