= Potomac Riverkeeper =

US non-profit organization

Potomac Riverkeeper Network
- Formation: 2000
- Headquarters: Washington, D.C.
- Potomac Riverkeeper: Jeff Kelble (President); Ed Merrifield (President Emeritus)
- Website: www.potomacriverkeepernetwork.org

Potomac Riverkeeper Network is an environmental, registered non-profit organization based in Washington, D.C. that is dedicated to protecting the Potomac River and its tributaries. As a "riverkeeper" organization, it is a member of the umbrella organization Waterkeeper Alliance.

== History ==
Potomac Riverkeeper Network, a member of the Waterkeeper Alliance, based in Washington, DC, was established in 2000 by principals from other environmental organizations, including: the Potomac Conservancy, Piedmont Environmental Council, Audubon Naturalist Society, and Sierra Club. The goal was to create a strong advocate for the Potomac Watershed—which includes the Potomac River, Shenandoah River, and Upper Potomac River—and enforce existing federal and state laws governing the Potomac watershed and protecting it from exploitation. The President Emeritus, Ed Merrifield, was hired in 2003 and Jeff Kelble was hired as the Shenandoah Riverkeeper in 2006. In 2014, Brent Walls became the Upper Potomac Riverkeeper, adding a third formal Riverkeeper program to Potomac Riverkeeper, Inc. in 2014, Jeff Kelble became President of the organization, leaving behind his former role as the Shenandoah Riverkeeper. In 2015, Mark Frondorf joined the organization as the new Shenandoah Riverkeeper, as well as Dean Naujoks as the new Potomac Riverkeeper. The three Riverkeeper branches call home to Potomac Riverkeeper Network, although operating within their specific regions.

Potomac Riverkeeper is a member of the Waterkeeper Alliance, one of the fastest growing environmental organizations in the world. The Waterkeeper movement began on New York's Hudson River in 1966 when commercial and recreational fishermen united to save the river. The early successes of Hudson Riverkeeper spurred an explosive growth of similar grassroots programs across the globe.

== Current work ==
In addition to its dedication to monitoring and enforcement of point source and non-point source pollution, Potomac Riverkeeper currently focuses on four main issues:

- Major Polluters
- Agricultural Pollution
- Resource Extraction
- Storm Water
- Sewage
- Water Quality Standards

== Shenandoah Riverkeeper and Upper Potomac Riverkeeper ==
In 2006, Potomac Riverkeeper, Inc. added a second Riverkeeper program for the Shenandoah River. The Shenandoah River is the largest river that flows into the Potomac River. Shenandoah Riverkeeper uses community action and enforcement to protect and restore water quality in the Shenandoah Valley for people, fish, and aquatic life.

In 2019, water analysis by the Upper Potomac Riverkeeper group found toxic substances consistent with black liquor from the kraft papermaking process, including arsenic, boron and methyl mercury, originating from the Luke Mill in Luke, Maryland.
