= Albrecht-Kemper Museum of Art =

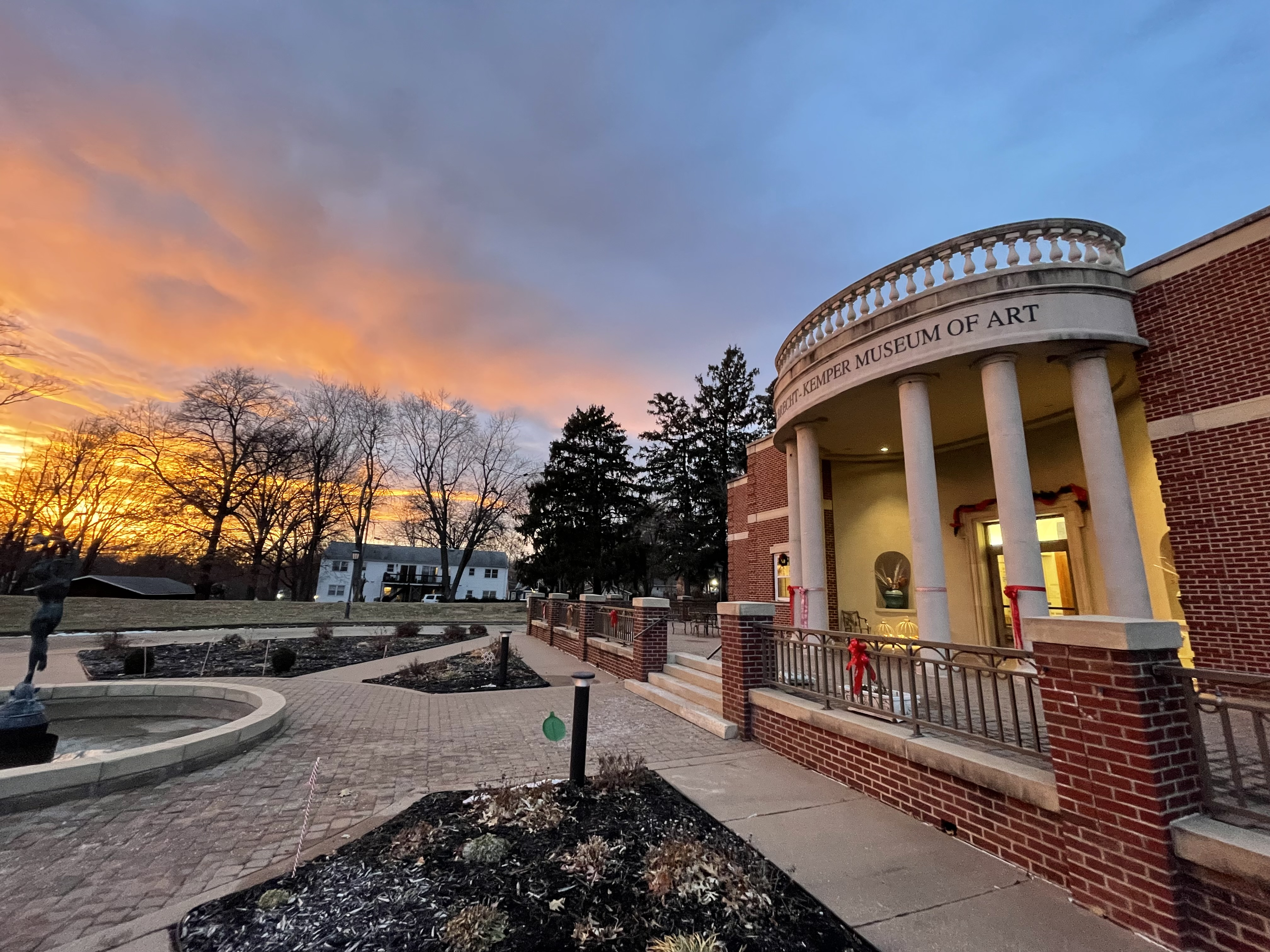
- Established: May 6, 1966
- Location: 2818 Frederick Avenue, Saint Joseph, Missouri, United States
- Coordinates: 39.7762°N 94.8232°W
- Public transit access: St. Joseph Transit
- Website: Albrecht-Kemper Museum of Art

The Albrecht-Kemper Museum of Art is an art museum located in St. Joseph, Missouri. The museum is in the former home of Mr. and Mrs. William Albrecht at 2818 Frederick Avenue. The Albrecht-Kemper Museum of Art has an extensive collection of 18th-, 19th- and 20th-century American art. Through special exhibitions, educational programs, performance events and publications, the Albrecht-Kemper serves as a cultural arts center for Northwest Missouri.

== Facility ==
In 1906, William Albrecht founded the soon-to-be successful Western Tablet Company which would produce the Big Chief tablet, used by school children nationwide. In 1933, William Albrecht bought property along Frederick Avenue where he would build his "dream house". In 1965, the Albrecht mansion was given to the St. Joseph Art League for use as an art gallery in memory of Mr. & Mrs. William Albrecht. The Albrecht Art Gallery was dedicated on May 6, 1966 with six pieces in the permanent collection. A 21,000-square-foot addition was built onto the back of the house in 1991, designed by Herb Duncan of Duncan Architects, Inc. The new addition includes a large gallery space with two tower galleries, a dining room, an auditorium, a gift shop, and educational facilities. At this time, the museum became The Albrecht-Kemper Museum of Art, honoring the patronage of Mr. R. Crosby Kemper.

== Permanent collection and exhibitions ==
=== American portrait gallery ===
The Terry and Kay Oldham Portrait Gallery displays some of the greatest American artists of the Eighteenth Century including John Wollaston, Gilbert Stuart, and John Neagle.

=== Contemporary art ===
The museum also has an extensive collection of contemporary American art displayed in the Thedinger Gallery, and the JP Barclay Gallery. Pop-up exhibitions can also be found throughout the museum.

=== Western art ===
The Albrecht-Kemper Museum of Art features a strong collection of Western art displayed in the Manning and Bebe Grimes Western Art Gallery including paintings by Olaf Wieghorst, James Reynolds, and Thomas Hart Benton.

=== Regionalist prints ===
The Schroeder Gallery features prints by the famous Regionalist artists including Thomas Hart Benton, Grant Wood, and John Steuart Curry.

=== Exhibitions ===
Galleries both upstairs and down are used for rotating exhibitions including featured artists and an annual membership exhibition. These galleries include the J. Douglas and Susan H. Essen Gallery, the Alison Wyeth-Campbell Gallery, the Steuart and Charlotte Campbell Gallery, and the Thedinger Gallery.
