= Leslie Thrasher =

American illustrator

- Tipping the Scales – Thrasher's famous cover picture
- Born: Charles Leslie Thrasher; September 15, 1889; Piedmont, West Virginia
- Died: December 2, 1936 (aged 47); Port Jefferson, New York
- Occupation: illustrator
- Years active: 1907–1936

Charles Leslie Thrasher (September 15, 1889 – December 2, 1936) was an American illustrator best known for his magazine covers for Liberty magazine and the Saturday Evening Post.

== Biography ==
Thrasher was born in Piedmont, West Virginia, on September 15, 1889, to Mason and Dorothy Thrasher. As a teenager, he studied art at the Pennsylvania Academy of Fine Arts and became a commercial artist at age 17. After graduating, he earned a scholarship to Académie de la Grande Chaumière in Paris. When he returned to the United States, he became a student of Howard Pyle. In 1912, Thrasher's work first appeared on the cover of the Saturday Evening Post, for which he eventually did twenty-three covers. During the First World War, he enlisted in the 40th Engineer Battalion. He was sent to France, where he partook in camouflage work. His lungs were severely damaged during a poison gas attack. Returning to the United States after the war, he married his wife Janet (née Jackson) at St. Stephen's in New York City in 1920, and settled in Long Island. He was hired in 1924 to create a series of covers for the then-new Liberty magazine, for $1000 per week. According to American Illustration's project on Leslie Thrasher, "in 1926, against the advice of fellow artist Norman Rockwell, he agreed to complete a cover a week for Liberty Magazine over a six year period." His contract with Liberty was terminated in 1932 because of declining circulation; Thrasher had created 360 covers for the publication.

A house fire occurred at Thrasher's residence in Old Field, New York, on November 29, 1936. Following cries for help from his wife, Thrasher, deaf at the time of the fire, was rescued unconscious from an upstairs bedroom by his neighbor and fellow artist, T. McFerguis Cooper. He was taken by ambulance to John T. Mather Memorial Hospital, where he was treated for severe smoke inhalation. He developed pneumonia and died at the hospital on December 2, 1936. The same fire destroyed much of Thrasher's work.

Thrasher had one daughter, Audrey.

== Style and legacy ==
Thrasher was a realist painter, often compared to Norman Rockwell. He is usually considered inferior to Rockwell, but it is noted that he had less time to develop his art. While Rockwell's backgrounds were highly detailed, Thrasher's backgrounds were simply set on white. Nonetheless, Thrasher is occasionally mistaken for Rockwell, in particular the piece "Tipping the Scales", which appeared on the Saturday Evening Post in October 1936.

Thrasher's most popular series of covers was created for Liberty and named "For the Love o' Lil." Lil represented a typical (if unusually attractive) middle-class woman, and the covers represented her "life" from young womanhood to middle age. "Storylines" for Lil were often suggested by readers. In 1930, a movie was made featuring Thrasher's character, and a radio show for the character was also produced.

In addition to his magazine cover illustrations, his work was featured prominently in advertisements for Chesterfield Cigarettes, Cream of Wheat, DuPont, and the Fisk Tire Company.
