= Big Chief tablet =

Writing notebook for children

The Big Chief tablet is a popular writing notebook designed for young children in the United States. It is made with newsprint paper and features widely spaced lines, easier to use for those learning to write. The tablet has a prominent representation of an American Indian man in full headdress on the cover, hence the name "Big Chief".

== History ==
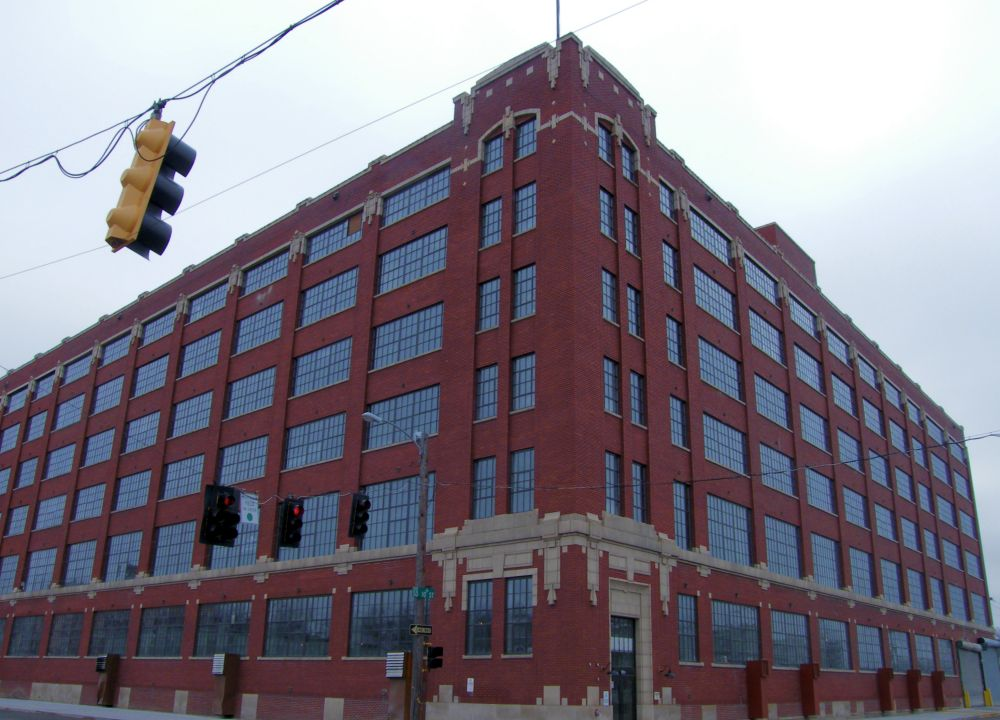
Western Tablet building in St. Joseph. It is now on the National Register of Historic Places. The building has been converted into apartments and is known as Mitchell Park Plaza.

The tablet was originated by William Albrecht (1879–1945), whose family had a stationery business in Quincy, Illinois. In 1906 he opened the Western Tablet Company in St. Joseph, Missouri, and it became the world's largest paper tablet producer. Albrecht's home on Frederick Boulevard in St. Joseph is now the Albrecht-Kemper Museum of Art. Big Chief tablets are still available for purchase from the Museum Shop. Western Tablet trademarked the Big Chief in 1947. Western Tablet expanded in the 1920s and moved its headquarters to Dayton, Ohio but most of the manufacturing components remained in St. Joseph. In 1964 the company was renamed "Westab".

Usage of the Big Chief peaked in the 1960s when another Westab invention—the spiral notebook—began to claim a bigger market share.

In 1966, the Mead Corporation acquired Western Tablet. Mead subsequently sold the Big Chief line to Springfield Tablet of Springfield, Missouri.

In January 2001, Everett Pad and Paper of Everett, Washington, purchased the inventory from Springfield. They closed their plant after 80 years operations, and Big Chief tablet production was halted. The plant in St. Joseph where the tablets were produced was closed in 2004 when Mead left the city.

In 2012, American Trademark Publishing, a division of Nimmons-Joliet Development Corporation of Brookshire, Texas, resumed the production of the Big Chief Writing Tablet.

== See also ==
- Examination book (sometimes referred to as a "blue book")
