= John A. Luke Jr. =

American businessman

- Education: Hotchkiss School
- Alma mater: Lawrence University
- Occupation: Businessman

John A. Luke Jr. is an American businessman. He serves as chairman and CEO of the MeadWestvaco Corporation.

== Education ==
Luke attended The Hotchkiss School and then Lawrence University, where he received his Bachelor of Arts in 1971. He attended the Wharton School of the University of Pennsylvania and received his master's degree in business administration in 1979.

== Career ==
Luke has served as the chairman and chief executive officer of MeadWestvaco Corporation since 2002. Previously, he was the president and chief executive officer from 2002 to 2003 and chairman, president, and CEO of Westvaco Corporation from 1996 to 2002. He currently serves on the board of directors of American Forest and Paper Association, The Timken Company, National Association of Manufacturers, The Bank of New York Mellon and FM Global.

He has also been on the board of Virginia Museum of Fine Arts, The First Tee, and VCU College of Engineering.

== Personal life ==
Luke is married to Kathleen Allen.
