= Piedmont, West Virginia =

- Town
- Town of Piedmont
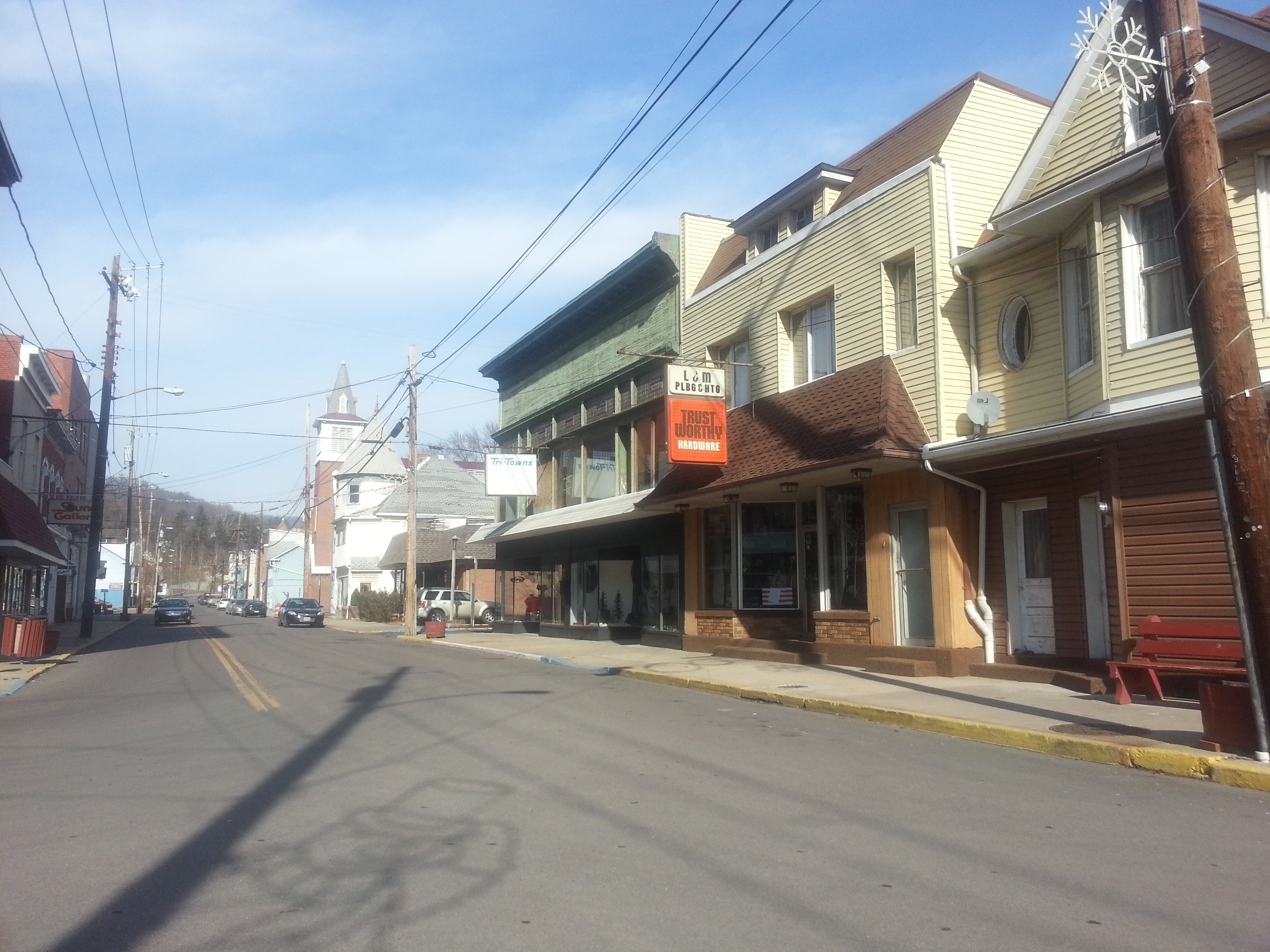
- Downtown Piedmont in January 2014

- Location of Piedmont in Mineral County, West Virginia.
- Coordinates: 39°28′49″N 79°02′53″W
- Country: United States
- State: West Virginia
- County: Mineral

Government
  - Type: Mayor/Council
  - Mayor: Rhonda Niland

Area
  - Total: 0.38 sq mi (0.99 km^{2})
  - Land: 0.38 sq mi (0.99 km^{2})
  - Water: 0 sq mi (0.00 km^{2})
- Elevation: 1,201 ft (366 m)

Population (2020)
  - Total: 718
  - Estimate (2021): 707
  - Density: 2,103.5/sq mi (812.16/km^{2})
- Time zone: UTC-5 (EST)
  - Summer (DST): UTC-4 (EDT)
- ZIP code: 26750
- Area code: 304
- FIPS code: 54-63604
- GNIS feature ID: 2391360
- Website: local.wv.gov/Piedmont/Pages/default.aspx

Piedmont is a town in Mineral County, West Virginia, United States. It is part of the Cumberland, MD-WV metropolitan statistical area. The population was 716 at the 2020 census. Piedmont was chartered in 1856 and the town is the subject of Colored People: A Memoir by Piedmont native Henry Louis Gates Jr.

== Geography ==
As its name suggests, Piedmont is located at the base of a mountain, in this instance the foot of the Allegheny Front, the eastern edge of the Allegheny Mountains or Appalachian Plateau, on the south (West Virginia) side of the North Branch of the Potomac River.

Piedmont is located at 39°28′49″N 79°2′53″W (39.480232, -79.048086). According to the United States Census Bureau, the town has a total area of 0.38 square miles (0.98 km^{2}), all land.

== Transportation ==
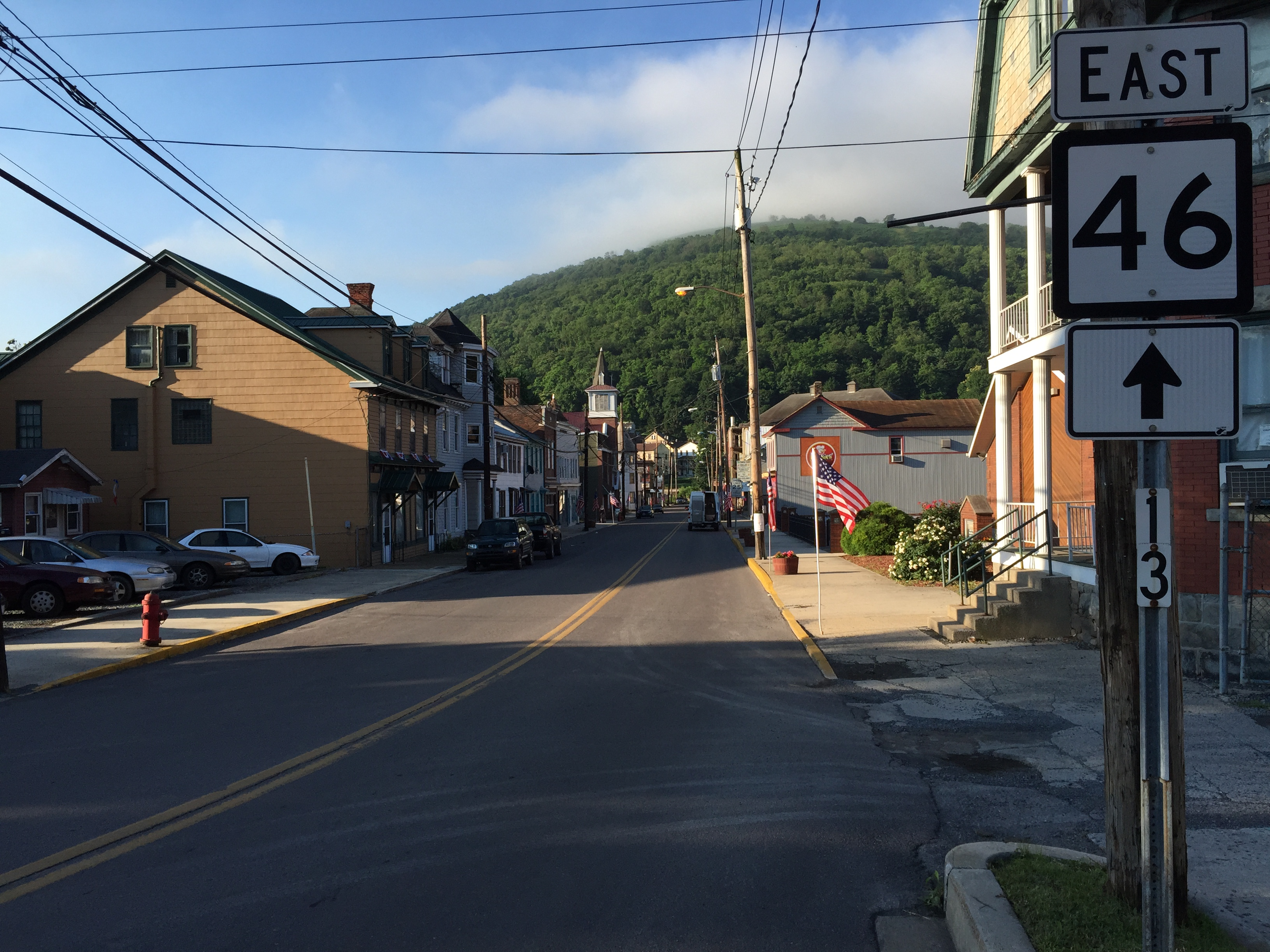
Route 46 eastbound in Piedmont

The only significant highway directly serving Piedmont is West Virginia Route 46. Route 46 continues west across the North Branch Potomac River into Westernport, Maryland. To the east, Route 46 heads to Keyser, where it has a junction with U.S. Route 220.

== History ==
The Town of Piedmont is situated in the Allegheny Front mountain range along the North Branch of the Potomac River. A century prior to the chartering of Piedmont, the area was opened for European settlement with the creation of Hampshire County in 1754 by the colonial government in Virginia. The region was the scene of hostile interactions between European settlers and pro-French Native Americans during the French and Indian War. Owing to its location and natural resources, the Piedmont area attracted German, Scotch-Irish, Swiss, English, and Italian immigrants, making the region more diverse than the primarily English-American Hampshire County. These cultural differences within the county, as well as growing population in the years leading up to the Civil War would later contribute to the formation of a new county.

The village of Piedmont was settled by people seeking to extract coal from the Allegheny Front mountain range which extends for several miles to the south of the town. Its strategic location at the intersection of George's Creek Valley, an industrial center in neighboring Maryland, made Piedmont a desirable location for a depot on the Baltimore and Ohio Railroad as it pushed west on its route to Wheeling and the Ohio River. The original main line of the B&O railroad reached the site of Piedmont on July 21, 1851. Two years later in 1853, the railroad reached the Ohio River at Wheeling, connecting Baltimore, Maryland with a direct route leading to the rapidly-growing Northwest Territory states. The line through Piedmont remains a segment of the B&O system, now part of CSX Transportation.

With the arrival of the B&O and the building of a roundhouse and rail yard, the Town of Piedmont was chartered in 1856. During the American Civil War (1861–1865), the town of Piedmont was frequently raided by the McNeill's Rangers in an effort by the Confederates to disrupt B&O train service. Despite the interruption of the war, the region continued to develop new industrial and commercial institutions, leading to the creation of Mineral County in 1866 (separated from Hampshire County). Along with neighboring Grant County, these two new counties were the first created in the state of West Virginia which itself was separated from Virginia in 1863. In 1888, William Luke established the West Virginia Paper Company (now Verso Luke Mill) on 50 acres (20 ha) of Maryland land known as West Piedmont (now Luke, Maryland, adjacent to the larger town of Westernport, Maryland), fueling further development of the region.

Notable residents of Piedmont have included U.S. Senator Henry Gassaway Davis who worked as a storekeeper and railroad agent before opening the region's largest coal mines on the "Big Vein" on the Allegheny Front. Leslie Thrasher, a noted illustrator whose work was featured on the covers of Liberty magazine and the Saturday Evening Post was born in Piedmont on September 15, 1889. Jazz musician and composer Don Redman was born in Piedmont on July 29, 1900. Henry Louis Gates, a professor of African-American history at Harvard University, was raised in Piedmont, an experience he described in his 1994 book Colored People. Steve Whiteman, lead singer for the glam/rock band Kix was raised in Piedmont and graduated from Piedmont High School.

== Demographics ==
Historical population
Census	Pop.	Note	%±
1870	1,366		—
1880	1,853		35.7%
1900	2,115		—
1910	2,054		−2.9%
1920	2,835		38.0%
1930	2,241		−21.0%
1940	2,677		19.5%
1950	2,565		−4.2%
1960	2,307		−10.1%
1970	1,763		−23.6%
1980	1,491		−15.4%
1990	1,094		−26.6%
2000	1,014		−7.3%
2010	876		−13.6%
2020	718		−18.0%
2021 (est.)	707	▼	−1.5%
U.S. Decennial Census

=== 2010 census ===
As of the census of 2010, there were 876 people, 385 households, and 225 families living in the town. The population density was 2,305.3 inhabitants per square mile (890.1/km^{2}). There were 480 housing units at an average density of 1,263.2 per square mile (487.7/km^{2}). The racial makeup of the town was 77.3% White, 17.9% African American, 0.1% Native American, 0.1% Asian, 0.6% from other races, and 4.0% from two or more races. Hispanic or Latino of any race were 2.1% of the population.

There were 385 households, of which 33.8% had children under the age of 18 living with them, 29.9% were married couples living together, 21.8% had a female householder with no husband present, 6.8% had a male householder with no wife present, and 41.6% were non-families. 36.9% of all households were made up of individuals, and 16.6% had someone living alone who was 65 years of age or older. The average household size was 2.28 and the average family size was 2.91.

The median age in the town was 37.1 years. 25.9% of residents were under the age of 18; 10.6% were between the ages of 18 and 24; 22.3% were from 25 to 44; 26.8% were from 45 to 64; and 14.4% were 65 years of age or older. The gender makeup of the town was 47.3% male and 52.7% female.

=== 2000 census ===
As of the census of 2000, there were 1,094 people, 423 households, and 266 families living in the town. The population density was 2,413.4 inhabitants per square mile (931.8/km^{2}). There were 499 housing units at an average density of 1,187.7 per square mile (458.6/km^{2}). The racial makeup of the town was 74.36% White, 21.79% African American, 0.20% Native American, 1.78% from other races, and 1.87% from two or more races. Hispanic or Latino of any race were 2.07% of the population.

There were 423 households, out of which 29.3% had children under the age of 18 living with them, 38.1% were married couples living together, 20.1% had a female householder with no husband present, and 37.1% were non-families. 32.9% of all households were made up of individuals, and 13.0% had someone living alone who was 65 years of age or older. The average household size was 2.40 and the average family size was 3.00.

In the town, the population was spread out, with 26.8% under the age of 18, 8.9% from 18 to 24, 28.6% from 25 to 44, 20.8% from 45 to 64, and 14.9% who were 65 years of age or older. The median age was 36 years. For every 100 females, there were 89.9 males. For every 100 females age 18 and over, there were 88.8 males.

The median income for a household in the town was $21,190, and the median income for a family was $26,964. Males had a median income of $21,938 versus $18,250 for females. The per capita income for the town was $11,678. About 24.7% of families and 30.7% of the population were below the poverty line, including 41.3% of those under age 18 and 23.5% of those age 65 or over.

== High schools ==
Piedmont has not had a high school in town since 1976. Piedmont High School was consolidated with Keyser High School in 1977. Although, at one time, there were three high schools in Piedmont; Davis Free School, 1890–1938, Howard High School, 1877–1955 and Piedmont High School, 1939–1976. These schools were recently memorialized by erecting a monument in front of the Piedmont city building on September 2, 2017. This was a vision of the Piedmont Back Street Community Festival Committee, led by President Chuck Green.

== Climate ==
The climate in this area has mild differences between highs and lows, and there is adequate rainfall year-round. According to the Köppen Climate Classification system, Piedmont has a marine west coast climate, abbreviated "Cfb" on climate maps.
