= Verso Corporation =

Defunct American paper producer

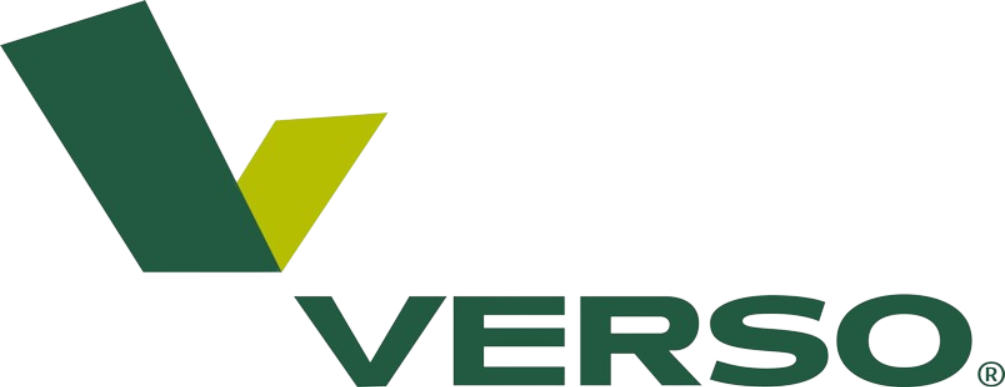
- Industry: Pulp and Paper
- Founded: 2006; 20 years ago
- Successor: Billerud North America
- Headquarters: Miamisburg, Ohio, United States
- Key people: Robert A. Kreizenbeck
- Products: pulp, paper and process industries
- Number of employees: 1700 (2021)
- Parent: Billerud AB

Verso Corporation, now Billerud Americas Corporation, was an American producer of coated papers including coated groundwood, coated freesheet, and specialty products. The company restructured in 2016 following Chapter 11 bankruptcy. Verso Corporation operated two paper mills in the U.S. In 2021, the company had approximately 1,700 employees.

In 2022, the Swedish company BillerudKorsnäs completed its acquisition of Verso for $825m.

== History ==
The company was formed in August 2006 when Apollo Global Management purchased the coated and supercalendered paper business from International Paper. In April 2008, Verso conducted an initial public offering and was listed on the New York Stock Exchange. In January 2015, Verso completed its acquisition of NewPage Holdings.

In 2008, Verso received the Environmental and Energy Achievement Award from the American Forest and Paper Association for its work with the Bucksport Environmental Innovation Partnership.

In 2010, Verso received the Sustainable Forestry Initiative (SFI) President's Award for its partnership efforts to promote sustainable forest management principles and initiatives in Maine.

In 2015, Verso Paper's Quinnesec Mill was awarded the Michigan Voluntary Protection Program (MVPP) Star award by the Michigan Occupational Safety and Health Administration (MIOSHA) for the fifth time.

Verso Corporation filed for Chapter 11 bankruptcy on January 26, 2016. Six months later, the company emerged from bankruptcy after restructuring and reducing its debt by $2.4 billion. As of January 2017, the company moved its headquarters from Memphis, Tennessee to Miamisburg, Ohio in a consolidation of offices as the company set a goal of reducing its overhead expenses by 10% annually.

In January 2017, B. Christopher DiSantis was appointed as chief executive officer (CEO) and a director of Verso effective as of February 1, 2017. DiSantis resigned in April 2019 and Leslie Lederer was appointed as interim CEO. At the end of April 2019, Verso gave two months notice of the impending closure of its mill in Luke, Maryland.

On June 9, 2020, Verso announced a plan to indefinitely idle its US paper mills in Wisconsin Rapids, Wisconsin and Duluth, Minnesota by late July 2020. The idling was due to the decline in demand for graphic paper and reduced use of print advertising in various industries during the coronavirus pandemic. According to the company, a small number of employees were to be kept on afterwards for an unknown time until remaining stock was sold. Between the two paper mills, about 1,000 employees were expected to be laid off, with 900 of those at the Wisconsin Rapids Mill. In January 2021, Verso announced that it no longer planned on restarting its Duluth mill, citing a decrease in demand as a result of the COVID-19 pandemic.

In April 2021, Verso reached a settlement over lawsuits regarding pollution in the Potomac River from the defunct Luke Paper Mill. As part of the settlement, Verso agreed to identify the sources and extent of the contamination and create a comprehensive plan to clean it, as well as pay $650,000 to the state of Maryland.

In December 2021, Swedish pulp and paper company BillerudKorsnäs announced a takeover of Verso, which was completed in 2022.

In January 2022, The state of Michigan announced a $244,451 settlement with Verso Corporation over national pollutant discharge elimination system violations at the company's Escanaba Paper Mill which resulted in fish being killed in the Escanaba River downstream of the mill.

In March 2022, the Swedish BillerudKorsnäs company completed its acquisition of Verso for $825m.
