= Kapstone =

American pulp and paper company

KapStone Paper & Packaging Corporation
- Type: Subsidiary
- Industry: Pulp and Paper
- Founded: April 15, 2005; 21 years ago
- Headquarters: Northbrook, Illinois, United States
- Products: Kraft paper, containerboard, Corrugated box, lumber
- Revenue: ▲US$ 3.08 billion (2016)
- Operating income: ▼US$ 170.65 million (2016)
- Net income: ▼US$ 86.25 million (2016)
- Total assets: ▲US$ 3.26 billion (2016)
- Total equity: ▲US$ 904.33 million (2016)
- Number of employees: 6,400 (2017)
- Parent: WestRock Company
- Website: www.westrock.com/kapstone/

KapStone Paper & Packaging (formerly Stone Arcade Acquisition Corporation) was an American pulp and paper company based in Northbrook, Illinois. It was founded in 2005 as Stone. Since November 2018 it has been a subsidiary of WestRock Company.

== History ==
Stone Arcade Acquisition Corporation, a special-purpose acquisition company, was started in 2005, and became an ongoing business concern when it completed its first acquisition—of International Paper—in 2007. By 2010, the firm was ranked 5th in Fortune Magazine's list of 100 Fastest-Growing Companies. In 2011 it made the list again, ranked 20th fastest-growing. In October 2011, KapStone was ranked #10 on Forbes list on 100 Best Small Companies.

On August 27, 2015, members of the Association of Western Pulp and Paper Workers at KapStone's Longview paper mill went on strike for 10 days over stalled contract negotiations.

=== Acquisitions ===
The firm acquired the Roanoke Rapids kraft paper mill from International Paper in January 2007. In July 2008, it acquired the Charleston kraft paper mill from MeadWestvaco.

On October 31, 2011, KapStone acquired U.S.Corrugated, Inc. It was started in 2006 by Dennis Mehiel, and primarily produces corrugated industrial packaging, with manufacturing facilities in seven states.

KapStone acquired Longview Fibre Paper and Packaging from Brookfield Asset Management on July 18, 2013 . Two years later, on June 1, 2015, it acquired Victory Packaging, headquartered in Houston, Texas.

On November 2, 2018, KapStone itself was acquired by rival pulp and paper company, WestRock Company.
