= WestRock =

Defunct American corrugated packaging company

WestRock Company
- Company type: Public
- Traded as: NYSE: SW
- Industry: Corrugated packaging
- Predecessor: MeadWestvaco; RockTenn
- Founded: 2015; 11 years ago
- Defunct: July 5, 2024; 20 months ago
- Fate: Merged with Smurfit Kappa
- Successor: Smurfit Westrock
- Headquarters: Sandy Springs, Georgia (Atlanta mailing address), United States
- Key people: David B. Sewell (CEO)
- Revenue: ▲US$14.86 billion (2017)
- Number of employees: c. 56,100 (September 2023)
- Website: westrock.com

WestRock was an American corrugated packaging company and in 2024 merged with Smurfit Kappa to become Smurfit Westrock. It was formed in July 2015 after the merger of MeadWestvaco and RockTenn. WestRock was the 2nd largest American packaging company. It was one of the world's largest paper and packaging companies with US$21.3 billion in annual revenue and more than 50,000 team members in more than 300 locations in 30 countries around the world. The company was headquartered in Sandy Springs, Georgia, consolidating offices from Norcross, Georgia and Richmond, Virginia.

== History and acquisitions ==
Westrock was formed in May 2015 after the merger of MeadWestvaco and Rock Tenn. MeadWestvaco stockholders received 0.78 shares of the combined company. Rock-Tenn stockholders chose either one share of the combined company or a specific cash amount for each of their shares.

In October 2015, WestRock purchased SP Fiber Holdings, Inc. The company manufactures recycled container board as well as kraft and bag paper. In January 2016, the company acquired Cenveo Packaging for $105 million which manufactures folded cartons and litho-laminated display packaging like MiraFoil, coil foil, and low migration ink systems. The sale included facilities located in the United States, Canada, and Dominican Republic.

In March 2017 WestRock purchased Star Pizza Box, the largest US manufacturer and distributor of pizza boxes.

In April 2017, WestRock completed the sale of its dispensing systems operations for $1.025 billion to Silgan Holdings.

In June 2017, the company acquired Multi Packaging Solutions International (MPS) for an enterprise value of $2.28 billion. MPS has 59 locations across North America, Europe, and Asia and will enhance Westrock's print, graphics, and design capabilities for more penetration in spirits, confectionery, beauty and cosmetics packaging.

In January 2018, the company acquired Plymouth Packaging, Inc. Later that month, WestRock announced that it would acquire rival pulp and paper company Kapstone. The deal closed in November of 2018. The company ranked 194th on the 2018 Fortune 500 of the largest United States corporations by revenue.

In September 2023, the company was reported to be in advanced merger talks with Smurfit Kappa to combine operations and form a "combined packaging group [with] adjusted earnings before interest, tax, depreciation and amortisation of $5.5bn."

In September 2023, it was announced WestRock had completed the sale of its subsidiary, RTS Packaging to the Hartsville, South Carolina-headquartered packaging company, Sonoco for $330 million.

In September 2023, it was announced WestRock and the Dublin, Ireland-headquartered corrugated packaging company, Smurfit Kappa had agreed to merge, to create Smurfit Westrock, one of the world's largest paper and packaging producers.
