= Southeastern Connecticut =

Regional planning agency in Southeastern Connecticut

Southeastern Connecticut Council of Governments (SCCOG)
Agency overview
- Formed: 2013
- Jurisdiction: Southeastern Connecticut region
- Headquarters: 5 Connecticut Avenue, Norwich, CT 06360
- Agency executive: Amanda E. Kennedy, Executive Director
- Website: seccog.org

Map of Connecticut showing the Southeastern Connecticut region

The Southeastern Connecticut region comprises, as the name suggests, the southeastern corner of the state of Connecticut. It is sometimes referred to as New London County or by the tourist slogan Mystic and More.

Southeastern Connecticut has historically been an area heavily dependent on traditional New England economic activities such as fishing, whaling, oystering, and the defense industry. In the present day, the area remains the primary home of the state's fishing and shellfish activity but has since diversified its economic base to include tourism, gambling, and other services.

The area is home to the United States Coast Guard Academy in New London, a United States Navy base in Groton (also home to Electric Boat where the first U.S. nuclear submarine, USS Nautilus, was launched, on January 21, 1954), a Pfizer research facility, and the Mohegan Sun and Foxwoods casinos.

== Definitions ==
There are several official definitions for the region. In all definitions, the following 20 towns are always included:

- Bozrah
- Colchester
- East Lyme
- Franklin
- Griswold
- Groton (town and separate central city)
- Jewett City
- Lebanon
- Ledyard
- Lisbon
- Montville
- New London (central city)
- North Stonington
- Norwich (central city)
- Preston
- Salem
- Sprague
- Stonington (town and separate borough)
- Voluntown
- Waterford
- Windham

=== Southeastern Connecticut ===
This is an official region administered by the Southeastern Connecticut Council of Governments. It consists of 18 towns and oversees land use and transportation infrastructure planning for its member towns.

=== Southeast Service Delivery Area ===
This definition adds the towns of Lyme, Old Lyme, and Voluntown to the 16 core towns listed above for a total of 19 towns.

=== New England City and Town Area ===
The Norwich-New London-Westerly NECTA is the metropolitan area surrounding the Norwich/New London urbanized area using towns as building blocks. This definition contains 22 towns and adds the towns of Canterbury, Lyme, Old Lyme, Voluntown, as well as the towns of Westerly and Hopkinton in Rhode Island (the latter of which now became part of the Providence–Fall River–Warwick, RI-MA NECTA).

=== Metropolitan Statistical Area ===
The Norwich-New London MSA is a metropolitan area definition using counties as building blocks. It consists of the 21 towns of New London County and adds the towns of Lyme and Old Lyme.

=== New London Labor Market Area ===
This definition contains 22 towns and adds the towns of Canterbury, Old Lyme, Old Saybrook, and Plainfield, as well as two towns in Rhode Island: Hopkinton and Westerly.

== Ethnicity ==
Southeastern Connecticut's largest ethnic group is composed of Irish-Americans, followed by Italian-Americans, Polish-Americans, and colonial British descent Americans historically referenced as “Swamp Yankees.” There is also a large Latino population mainly from Puerto Rico, followed by the Dominican Republic, Haiti, Jamaica, and Ecuador. There is an African-American presence in many municipalities, and many Asian communities in different parts of the region. The Pequot and Mohegan tribes both have their own reservations and casinos, along with a strong identity to their culture, though most tribal members only have partial Native American ancestry. Southeastern Connecticut is an ethnically diverse region.
