= Dick Bertel =

American newscaster (1931–2023)

- Born: Richard Edwin Bertelmann; January 6, 1931; The Bronx, New York, U.S.
- Died: September 11, 2023 (aged 92); Rockville, Maryland, U.S.
- Education: New York University, B.A., 1952 (broadcasting)
- Occupations: Radio and television personality, announcer, program host, reporter, newscaster, media executive

Richard Bertelmann (January 6, 1931 – September 11, 2023), professionally known as Dick Bertel, was an American radio and television personality and broadcasting executive who was best known for his work locally in Hartford, Connecticut, nationally on the NBC and Mutual Broadcasting System radio networks, and internationally for the Voice of America.

== Early life ==
Richard Bertelmann was born on January 6, 1931, at Bronx Maternity Hospital on the Grand Concourse in the Bronx borough of New York City, to Meta Katherina "Martha / Mattie" (née Delvanthal) Bertelmann, the daughter of German immigrants living in the East Harlem neighborhood of Manhattan, and Heinrich "Henry" Bertelmann, who immigrated to the United States from Hemmoor, Germany in 1909, disembarking from the steamship President Lincoln at Ellis Island. He was naturalized in 1933. Bertelmann's only sibling was his brother Henry John "Harry" Bertelmann, a U.S. Army veteran of World War II.

His mother claimed that as Bertelmann first learned to talk, he would frequently babble a version of "W-E-A-F New York," the hourly legal identification of one of the most prominent stations in New York City at that time. During his early childhood, family and friends called him "Richie." While growing up in the Wakefield section of the Bronx, he attended Public Schools 87 and 68.

His parents legally separated in 1936 and were officially divorced in 1939. In 1940, his mother married James Morton "Jim" Latz, a draftsman and veteran of World War I, who by this time had already become Bertelmann's primary father figure. The family moved to nearby Darien, Connecticut in 1944 when his stepfather was hired to manage the Marchand medicine cabinet factory in Stamford, Connecticut, which had been converted into a war plant.

Before meeting his new classmates at Hollow Tree Ridge Junior High School (Middlesex Middle School today), Bertelmann decided to introduce himself as "Dick" rather than "Richie." From this point forward, he was always known socially as "Dick."

After one year at Hollow Tree Ridge, he attended Darien High School as a member of the Class of 1948. In 1947, he was elected Homecoming King.

== Early career ==
During the years 1948–1955, Bertelmann's career began at Fairfield County radio stations in the New York suburbs surrounding Darien and strung along the Boston Post Road corridor. Three forces shaped the American broadcasting industry as Bertelmann gathered his early experience with it.

- The Federal Communications Commission (FCC) lifted its wartime ban on issuing licenses, allowing new stations to proliferate across the United States, especially in small cities and towns.
- The explosive growth of commercial television caused radio networks to reduce their programming. This in turn increased the need for local stations to produce their own shows. In addition, TV was creating new job opportunities for broadcasters.
- Despite radio's superior audio fidelity, FM stations were struggling to find audiences. In 1945, existing FM stations had been rendered obsolete when the FCC reassigned their portion of the spectrum (then between 42 and 50 MHz) to VHF television stations. Meanwhile, postwar consumers were more interested in purchasing television sets than radios with receivers that could be tuned to the new FM band (the current 88 to 108 MHz). This limited the interest of most operators in seeking FM licenses and increased the risk of investing in innovative FM programming, thus compounding the problem of low consumer interest in buying radios with FM receivers. As a result of this cycle, AM stations would continue to dominate radio listening for the next three decades.

=== WNLK in Norwalk ===
In April 1948, shortly before graduating from high school, Bertelmann requested a tour of WNLK, a new daytime-only radio station being built in neighboring Norwalk, Conn., and was offered an unpaid position. Initially writing and announcing news from his school, within a few months he was hosting The Hi Teen Show, a weekly Saturday morning program featuring local amateur singers, a band, and sketches performed by teenagers.

In 1948, to accommodate his work, WNLK moved his shift to Sunday. When the station was granted a full-time license in the summer of that year, he was placed on the WNLK payroll.

Bertelmann also performed with and announced for the Community Radio Workshop, a group of local hobbyist actors who produced a program on WNLK called The Mystery Theater of the Air and who also appeared in community stage productions. In 1950, WNLK broadcast a supernatural drama called "The House of Retribution" which Bertelmann wrote for the show.

Bertelmann remained at WNLK until 1951 when he accepted a Sunday shift at WNAB in Bridgeport.

=== New York University ===
From September 1948 to June 1952 he concurrently commuted from Darien to Manhattan on the New Haven Railroad to earn a degree in broadcasting from New York University (NYU). One of his instructors was Brad Phillips who had just started what would become a forty-four year career as a news anchor on WINS Radio in New York. (On Election Night in 1948 Phillips would stay on the air for twenty-three straight hours covering the results of the presidential race between President Harry S. Truman and Governor Thomas E. Dewey.)

=== WGCH (FM) in Greenwich ===
In the Fall of 1948, testing began on a new New York television station, WOR-TV (today WWOR). While attempting to tune in a test pattern, Bertelmann instead found an unrelated audio broadcast. It was a test of an experimental FM station in Greenwich, WGCH, which due to a harmonic could be heard on the audio carrier of channel 9. Bertelmann responded to an announcer's invitation to listeners to call the station to report reception. Within a couple of weeks he decided to use that telephone conversation as a reason to visit the station and introduce himself. During that visit, he offered to volunteer as an announcer.

By January 1949, he was hosting The Teen Turntable on WGCH on Saturday afternoons, working for free to gain experience just as he was presently doing at WNLK. After hosting The Hi Teen Show on WNLK in the morning, he would take a bus to Greenwich carrying a case of his personal collection of 78 RPM records for use on his WGCH show. Within weeks, WGCH offered him an announcing shift on Thursday and Friday afternoons and all day Saturday as well as $18 per week, making this his first paid position. On Saturday nights he hosted a listener call-in show called Request Party and co-hosted Jazz Cavalcade with a local record collector, Bill Gray. On Sundays he hosted a music show called Rhythm and Song.

In the Summer of 1949, Bertelmann was made the acting program director at WGCH, covering for program director Jack Hines during his hospitalization for pneumonia and the recovery that followed.

In 1950, Bertelmann hosted a Christmas broadcast featuring music conducted by Erich Kunzel, then a student at Greenwich High School, who would become known as the "Prince of Pops" during an illustrious career leading the Cincinnati Pops Orchestra.

Bertelmann continued to work at WGCH until he graduated from NYU in 1952. By that time, however, struggling to find an audience and advertisers on the FM band, WGCH was only broadcasting for 3 1/2 hours per day. At the end of that year, it ceased operations altogether.

That station has no relations to the current WGCH which commenced in 1964.

=== WNAB in Bridgeport ===
While continuing his work at WGCH, in 1951 Bertelmann left WNLK to begin working Sundays at WNAB (today WCUM), the ABC affiliate in Bridgeport, where a friend he had made at WNLK, Bill Edwardsen, was now the chief announcer. (Edwardsen would become a fixture in the Albany - Schenectady - Troy, N.Y. market, primarily on WGY Radio and WRGB Television.)

When he graduated from NYU in 1952, he was hired for the daily night shift, his first full-time position. Although he would continue to host The Saturday Night Dance Party, he was soon moved to the midday shift and was appointed to be the continuity director, writing all of the commercial copy for the station. He left WNAB in 1954 to work for WSTC.

On Sunday nights, WNAB broadcast live performances of big bands appearing at the Ritz Ballroom in Bridgeport. Bertelmann participated as an announcer, receiving his first professional experience working with celebrities. In this capacity, he interviewed famous musicians including Billy May, Lionel Hampton, Louis Armstrong, Charlie Spivak, Lou Monte, Don Cornell, Ralph Flanagan, and Steve Lawrence.

=== WSTC in Stamford ===
When Bertelmann and his family first moved to Darien in 1944, he began listening to WSRR in Stamford, an affiliate of NBC's Blue Network, which would become the American Broadcasting Company (ABC) in 1945. Intrigued that this radio station was broadcasting within a few miles of his new home, Bertelmann and one of his Hollow Tree Ridge Junior High School classmates visited the station and asked for a tour. The announcer on duty showed them the operation and allowed them to stand silently in the studio while he conducted a record show. Bertelmann resolved then that he would one day come to work for that station, which would change its call letters to WSTC in 1946.

In 1954, WSTC hired him for the night shift, delivering the eleven o'clock newscast and conducting station breaks around network shows such as The Lone Ranger. Other members of the staff included Scott Vincent (who would become a staff announcer for ABC), Jerry Damon (who would become a staff announcer for NBC), and Dee Caruso (who would become a TV writer and producer for Get Smart, The Monkees, and The Smothers Brothers Show).

Up until now, he had been using his name "Dick Bertelmann" on WNLK, WGCH, and WNAB. Other announcers at WSTC used stage names so he decided it was time to coin one for himself. At WSTC he started calling himself "Dick Richards."

One night in September 1954, one of Bertelmann's colleagues conceived a plan for them to meet women working as nurses in residence at Stamford Hospital. He would call a dormitory on the hospital's campus under the pretense of being a producer seeking requests for records to be played on The Dick Richards Show, then ask the nurse on the phone if she and her friends would like to meet Dick Richards and his coworkers at a pizzeria. That led to Bertel's courtship with Jean Thies, a native of Dunkirk / Fredonia, New York, and their marriage in November 1955.

=== Move to Hartford, Conn. ===
Engaged to be married and contemplating how to best position his career to support a family, Bertelmann decided in 1955 that he needed to move to a new, larger market. In 1955, the Bridgeport - Stamford - Norwalk market ranked 31st in the U.S. Although not small, it was overshadowed by nearby New York, the largest market in the country, and the powerhouse stations that operated there. Looking seventy-five miles away to Connecticut's capital city, Bertelmann resolved that he would find a new job in the Hartford - New Britain market, then ranked 27th nationally.

In 1955, Bertel sought employment in Hartford, Connecticut, which offered a larger broadcasting market than Bridgeport–Stamford–Norwalk. At the time, the Hartford–New Britain market ranked 27th nationally. Located between the larger New York City and Boston broadcasting markets, Hartford was also home to radio station WTIC, where Bertel later worked.

=== WGTH Radio ===
In July 1955, Bertelmann visited most of the major radio stations in Hartford including WTIC. In the early autumn, he accepted a job at WGTH Radio (WPOP today).

His first assignments included weekend work. On Saturdays he hosted a live children's talent show from the Brown Thomson department store in Hartford. On Sundays when the station would carry local foreign language programming, he would run the equipment for those amateur hosts.

In December he played the master of ceremonies for The Christmas Carol Sing, an event organized by The Hartford Times newspaper, and announced the program on WGTH. A tradition for many years, more than ten thousand people would gather outside the Hartford Times Building to join a choir singing Christmas carols and other holiday songs.

Turnover was rampant at WGTH. As a result, within weeks, Bertelmann, who was still using the "Dick Richards" air-name that he had created for himself at WSTC in Stamford, had become the senior announcer. As such, he hosted The Uprising, the daily morning show. At midday he co-hosted Luncheon with Dottie and Dick with the station's women's director, Dottie Coleman, who usually referred to him as "Richard" on the program.

Besides the regional Yankee Network, WGTH was both an ABC and a Mutual affiliate. When the Mutual network comedy team Bob and Ray broadcast their show nationally from the Hartford State Armory, Bertelmann performed as their announcer. Similarly when the Mutual news commentator Cedric Foster (the former manager of WTHT, a predecessor to WGTH) broadcast his network show from WGTH, Bertelmann read his intro and several public service announcements.

== WTIC Radio under the Travelers Insurance Company ==
When Bertelmann first arrived in Hartford, WTIC was still owned by the Travelers Insurance Company, the company that founded it in 1925, and located in its original studios at 26 Grove Street. (The road was renamed “Bob Steele Street” in 2003.) In 1961, WTIC relocated to its custom-built, state-of-the-art Broadcast House building on Constitution Plaza. In 1964, Constitution Plaza Inc. and the Travelers Broadcasting Service merged to form Broadcast-Plaza Inc., which continued to operate as a Travelers subsidiary until the insurance behemoth sold the stations in 1974.

Arrival

In April 1956, Bertelmann learned WTIC had an opening on its announcing staff. He called the chief announcer and auditions manager, Fred Wade, and asked for an interview. During his first audition, Bertelmann shared Studio F (which looked more like a living room than a radio studio) with Ross Miller, "Ross the Musical Boss," the host of Juke Box Jingles [sic], who was asked to read the same scripts as Bertelmann to contrast his delivery. They worked together again a couple of weeks later in Studio C, a small audience participation room, when Wade asked Bertelmann to return to audition for the program manager, Leonard J. Patricelli. At the end of that visit, Bertelmann was introduced to Paul W. Morency, the president and general manager of WTIC.

Bertel’s first day of work at WTIC was May 13, 1956. One of his first assignments was to serve as the announcer for Medley Time, a program of live organ music played by Hal Kolb.

Becoming "Dick Bertel"

There was one condition on his employment, however: He could no longer call himself "Dick Richards." WTIC wanted to avoid any confusion with another announcer, Floyd Richards, who had been on the staff since 1943. Because "Bertelmann" (pronounced "BURT’l’min") sounded muddled, Wade proposed that he call himself "Bertel" (pronounced "burr’TELL") instead. Although he would always use Bertelmann in his private life, he would forevermore be known professionally as "Dick Bertel."

=== Staff Announcer ===
Besides Ross Miller, Floyd Richards, and Fred Wade, Bertel joined an announcing staff that included Ed Anderson, Bob Arel, Frank Atwood, Jean Colbert, Bruce Kern, Paul Lucas, Bob Steele, and Bob Tyrol. During Bertel's twenty-one year tenure, other staff announcers would include Bill Clede, Bill Corsair, Brad Davis, Arnold Dean, George Ehrlich, John Elliott, Bob Ellsworth, Joe Girand, Bill Hanson, Bill Hennessey, Bill Henry, Art Johnson, Lani Jurev, George Malcolm-Smith, Bob Nelson, Mike Ogden, Lou Palmer, Norm Peters, Ray Rice, Robert E. Smith, John Stevens, Al Terzi, Jim Thompson, Doug Webster, Dana Whalen, and Jerry Williams.

Staff announcers read commercials, issued station breaks, and delivered newscasts. The staff announcers would read newscasts prepared by the newsroom, often fifteen minutes in length with no breaks, not even for actualities or commercials.

=== Program Host ===
Regarded as one of WTIC's most versatile announcers and best interviewers, Bertel hosted many programs during his tenure at WTIC.

Conversation Piece

From 1956 to 1969, Bertel hosted Conversation Piece, a half-hour program he conceived and produced that was broadcast each weekday at 7:00 p.m. It was built mainly on intriguing stories provided weekly by the script service A.P.S. Inc. Examples are how President Abraham Lincoln considered the number 13 to be his lucky number, a theory that Napoleon Bonaparte may have been murdered, and the Jet Propulsion Laboratory's report to the nation on the Space Race. The theme song was "No Strings Attached" performed by Richard Hayman and his Orchestra, over which Bertel read this introduction: "And a very pleasant good evening to you, this is Dick Bertel welcoming you to Conversation Piece, featuring facts and figures about the world we live in, a touch of music on records, plus strange and unusual stories of actual happenings."

Americana

In 1962, Bertel assumed hosting duties of Americana, a ninety-minute interview program with a patriotic tilt that aired daily at 2:00 p.m. Guests would discuss historical subjects, current events, and cultural traditions from around the nation although stories with connections to Connecticut and its neighbors were most prominent. Typically, these discussions were prerecorded in one session and segmented so that they could be stripped across the entire week. Occasionally, they would be recorded on-location such as in the cab of a steam locomotive on the Valley Railroad in Essex, Conn., on a riverboat on the Connecticut River with a live jazz band, and during Thanksgiving on the grounds of Old Sturbridge Village.

Christmas Eve Shows

A tradition from 1962 to 1976, Bertel hosted an hour-long program of holiday music at 8:00 p.m. each Christmas Eve. Beginning in 1964, he included his children in the dialogue. Many times the shows incorporated guests such as illustrator and painter Norman Rockwell; Sleigh Ride and Christmas Festival composer Leroy Anderson; Virginia O’Hanlon Douglas, the inspiration for Yes, Virginia, there is a Santa Claus; opera star and civil rights icon Marian Anderson; and Johnny Marks, the composer of Rudolph the Red-nosed Reindeer first sung by Gene Autry.

Saturday Showcase

From 1967 to 1969, Bertel hosted Saturday Showcase which was modeled after the Sunday Showcase program that Arnold Dean had anchored since starting at WTIC in 1965. It was a music program that usually spotlighted the catalogue of a particular performer or group. It included features provided by Jean Colbert, the director of women’s programs, and Bill Clede, the outdoors editor.

‘TIC Afternoon Edition

In 1968, Bertel was directed to take over the ‘TIC Afternoon Edition from 3:00 to 7:00 p.m. which, after a long period of being the dominant afternoon show in the market, had plummeted in popularity. For the first time, he introduced current rock music (that complemented the station’s usual middle-of-the-road selections) into the playlist. The show returned to number one within the first ratings period.

WTIC Anniversary Shows

Every year Bertel would anchor a retrospective program to mark the anniversary of WTIC’s first broadcast on February 10, 1925. The title was usually styled like “The Broadcaster at Forty” as it was in 1965 for example.

The Golden Age of Radio

The Broadcaster anniversary shows attracted the interest of a particular listener, Ed Corcoran, a computer programmer who had compiled a massive collection of early network radio shows that he had recorded himself off the air. After Corcoran introduced himself to Bertel, he frequently appeared as a guest on one of Bertel's various programs to share his collection.

In 1970, together they created and hosted The Golden Age of Radio, a monthly program featuring interviews with radio actors, writers, musicians, producers, and engineers primarily from the 1930s, 1940s, and 1950s who would comment on clips culled from Corcoran’s collection. It continued until Bertel left the station in 1977 and yielded one of the most extensive oral histories of that singular era in American media and entertainment. Vincent Price, Don Ameche, Rudy Vallée, Mason Adams, Ruby Keeler, and Joan Fontaine are just a few examples of the notable people who appeared on this show.

In the late 1990s and early 2000s, The Golden Age of Radio interviews were regularly incorporated into The Big Broadcast, a weekly compilation of recordings from radio's golden age on WAMU in Washington, D.C., the public radio station owned and operated by American University, which was then hosted by Ed Walker. The SiriusXM Radio Classics channel still occasionally plays excerpts from these interviews.

Special Programs

Bertel was frequently assigned to host specials that WTIC Radio would produce, particularly its coverage of the Space Race. In one broadcast, he led a program from the Springfield (Mass.) Science Museum to report on the spacecraft Mariner 4 as it transmitted pictures of the surface of Mars. The program made broadcast history because the studio-to-transmitter link was partially conducted on a laser beam engineered by the PerkinElmer corporation.

WTIC-FM

During the period that Bertel worked at WTIC, WTIC-FM simulcast WTIC (AM) much of the time, but would break away for its own classical music programs. Like many of the other staff announcers, Bertel worked shifts on WTIC-FM as a classical music host.

=== Breaking News ===
As a member of the Special Events team, Bertel would anchor, report on, and otherwise contribute to breaking news coverage of weather events, power blackouts, and other emergencies such as the 1961 Hartford Hospital fire. These events included two of the three major assassinations of American public figures during the 1960s.

The Assassination of President Kennedy

The news that President John F. Kennedy had been wounded by an assassin broke into the final minutes of Mikeline on WTIC Radio which was being hosted on Friday, November 22, 1963 by Floyd Richards and Bob Ellsworth. After the standard NBC five minute newscast at 2:00 p.m. EST ended, Bertel assumed anchoring duties at the direction of producer Bill Marks. Bertel interrupted music selections with news updates from the wire services until NBC finally began providing its radio affiliates with continuous coverage at 2:11 p.m.

Throughout the weekend that followed, Bertel anchored the major newscasts on Channel 3, the only local content Channel 3 broadcast until the day following the president's funeral.

The Assassination of Dr. Martin Luther King

Just as he was concluding his Conversation Piece program on WTIC Radio at 7:30 p.m. EST on April 4, 1968, Bertel was handed a bulletin, which he read while transitioning to a newscast, announcing that civil rights leader Dr. Martin Luther King had been shot in Memphis, Tenn. Later that evening, he anchored the 11 o'clock newscast on Channel 3 which was dominated by assassination-related demonstrations in Hartford's North End neighborhood.

== WTIC-TV, Channel 3 ==
From its founding in 1957 until it was sold in 1974, Bertel anchored newscasts and hosted public affairs shows on WTIC-TV, Channel 3 (today WFSB).

== WKSS Radio ==
From 1978 to 1984, Bertel managed WKSS, a "beautiful music" radio station in Hartford. He was also the host of the morning show, Good Morning, New England.

== Voice of America ==
In 1984, Bertel moved to the Washington, D.C. area where he became the executive producer for the Voice of America. From 1991 to 1993, Bertel worked for two years in Munich, Germany managing affiliate relations for VOA Europe, the Voice of America's pop music service aimed at European listeners. Returning to Washington, he created Talk to America, an international call-in show.

== WTOP Radio ==
From 1986 to 1989, Bertel worked as an anchor on WTOP, an all-news radio station in Washington, D.C.

== NBC and Mutual Broadcasting System ==
From 1988 to 1991, Bertel worked as an anchor on NBC Radio Network and the Mutual Broadcasting System, both owned and operated by Westwood One.

== Retirement and death ==
In retirement, Bertel regularly volunteered to help non-native speakers of English achieve conversational competency. He died on September 11, 2023, at the age of 92.
