= WTIC =

WTIC may refer to:

- WTIC (AM), a radio station (1080 AM) licensed to Hartford, Connecticut, United States
- WTIC-FM, a radio station (96.5 FM) licensed to Hartford, Connecticut, United States
- WTIC-TV, a television station (channel 34, virtual 61) licensed to Hartford, Connecticut, United States
- The commodity symbol for West Texas Intermediate Crude oil, a.k.a. Texas Sweet Light
- The callsign of WFSB from 1957 to 1974
- With tongue-in-cheek (Internet acronym)
