= WZMX =

- Hartford, Connecticut; United States
- Broadcast area: Greater Hartford; Greater New Haven
- Frequency: 93.7 MHz (HD Radio)
- Branding: HOT 93.7

Programming
- Language: English
- Format: Rhythmic contemporary
- Subchannels: HD2: Channel Q; HD3: Caribbean music "Roadblock Radio"

Ownership
- Owner: Audacy, Inc.; (Audacy License, LLC)
- Sister stations: WRCH; WTIC; WTIC-FM

History
- First air date: 1959
- Former call signs: WFNQ (1959–1962); WSCH (1962–1964); WLAE (1964–1969); WLVH (1969–1989); WLVH-FM (1989–1990)
- Call sign meaning: "Mix" (former branding)

Technical information
- Licensing authority: FCC
- Facility ID: 1900
- Class: B
- ERP: 17,000 watts
- HAAT: 259 meters (850 ft)
- Transmitter coordinates: 41°33′44.4″N 72°50′40.4″W

Links
- Public license information: Public file; LMS
- Webcast: Listen live (via Audacy); HD3: Listen live
- Website: www.audacy.com/hot937; HD3: www.roadblockradio.com

WZMX (93.7 FM), better known as "HOT 93.7" is an urban-leaning rhythmic contemporary radio station licensed to Hartford, Connecticut. The station is owned by Audacy, Inc. Its transmitter is located on West Peak in Meriden, and the station's studios and offices are located on Addison Road in Windsor.

== History ==
The 93.7 frequency first signed on in the late 1960s as WLVH, the first Spanish-language radio station in the state of Connecticut. Though the station had a loyal audience, the concept of a Spanish-language FM station in an area with a (then) relatively small Hispanic population was seen as being ahead of its time. With FM prices rising, WLVH later bought 1550 kHz (today's WSDK), and in 1991, sold 93.7 to American Radio Systems (ARS), with WLVH moving to AM. With ARS's takeover came the change to a stunt with the local NOAA Weather Radio signal for a week before the launch of the new format: hot adult contemporary, as WZMX, chosen for the station's "Mix 93.7" format by program director Herb Crowe (formerly of KIIM-FM in Tucson) and midday personality Ron O. The "Mix" format promised listeners a mix of different varieties of music with little talk or DJ chatter, a directive reflected in the slogan "Four songs in a row - No talk".

Other DJs included WTIC-FM alums and husband/wife team Jonathan Monk and Diana Kelly in mornings, production coordinator Ron O (and later, Donna Rose) in middays, Neil Jackson in afternoons, Ted Dalaku in evenings, and Danny Wright in overnights.

In spite of being a "new" station for the majority of the market's listeners, the "Mix" format began well, but it then started to flounder. The purchase of rival WTIC-FM by ARS in 1994 and its subsequent conversion to a hot AC format led ARS to flip the younger WZMX to an all-1970s hits format in the middle of that year. To boost the station's listenership, WZMX hired popular morning drive host Sebastian away from WCCC-FM in February 1995, and engaged well-known announcer Chuck Riley to be the station's voiceover talent. After a downturn in 1996, the station added 1960s and 1980s music and re-imaged itself as "Classic Hits 93-7".

The "Classic Hits" period produced a lot of creative programming, such as "Saturday specials" which followed a theme (i.e., all disco music, music of the '80s, management staff hosting shows), ran countdowns that at times featured hundreds of songs, and was the Connecticut home of New England Patriots football games and an overflow home of Hartford Whalers hockey games.

By 1998, "Classic Hits" had run its course, and rumors of a format change circulated. After CBS Radio took over the ARS stations that spring, WZMX's format evolved into a broad-based, classic-leaning, rock format as "The Point". This format never had any sort of success, and on May 6, 1999, at 10:00 am, WZMX flipped to a "Jammin' Oldies"-style format as "Dancin' Oldies Z93.7". The first song on "Z" was "Celebration" by Kool & the Gang. As with other stations in that format (and as with past formats of 93.7's existence), the format had early success, but soon dropped in the ratings, and was still the lowest-rated station in the Hartford market.

On March 16, 2001, at 5:00 pm, WZMX flipped to an urban-leaning rhythmic format as "Hot 93.7", based on that of sister station WPGC-FM in Washington, D.C. The last song on "Z" was "Last Dance" by Donna Summer, while the first song on "Hot" was "Stutter" by Joe. The first station playing such a format on FM in the Hartford, New Haven and Springfield markets, WZMX would soon become a regular Top 5 station and often has been the No. 1 station in the market. Coincidentally, that same format had been proposed as a replacement twice before, but was rejected for fear that it would not work in the Hartford market. The success of "Hot 93.7" led to the launch of rival WPHH ("Power 104.1") in 2003, which had a limited effect on WZMX's success. WPHH was the sister station of Mainstream Top 40-formatted WKSS, whose once-dominant hold on Hartford's Top 40 scene would take a major beating in the wake of WZMX's arrival, which in turn may have served as one of the reason behind WPHH's debut. WZMX also has competition with WKSS and WPHH's sister station in New Haven, Top 40-formatted WKCI-FM, which has also seen its listener base erode slightly after Hot 93.7's debut.

On February 2, 2017, CBS Radio announced it would merge with Entercom. The merger was approved on November 9, 2017, and was consummated on the 17th.
