= WRCH (FM) =

Adult contemporary radio station in New Britain–Hartford, Connecticut

- New Britain, Connecticut; United States
- Broadcast area: Greater Hartford
- Frequency: 100.5 MHz (HD Radio)
- Branding: Lite 100.5 WRCH

Programming
- Language: English
- Format: Adult contemporary
- Affiliations: Premiere Networks

Ownership
- Owner: Audacy, Inc.; (Audacy License, LLC)
- Sister stations: WTIC; WTIC-FM; WZMX

History
- First air date: July 1, 1968; 58 years ago
- Call sign meaning: Radio Connecticut Hartford or "Rich music" (former slogan)

Technical information
- Licensing authority: FCC
- Facility ID: 1910
- Class: B
- ERP: 7,500 watts
- HAAT: 381 meters (1,250 ft)
- Transmitter coordinates: 41.704°N 72.832°W

Links
- Public license information: Public file; LMS
- Webcast: Listen live (via Audacy)
- Website: www.audacy.com/wrch

WRCH (100.5 FM; "Lite 100.5") is a commercial radio station licensed to New Britain, Connecticut, and serving the Greater Hartford and New Haven areas. It is owned by Audacy, Inc. and airs an adult contemporary radio format.

WRCH's transmitter is located on Rattlesnake Mountain, and transmits from the WTIC-TV tower off U.S. Route 6 (Colt Highway) in Farmington. A backup transmitter is in "Radio Park" behind the Connecticut School of Broadcasting, its former studio location. The station's studios and offices are located on Addison Road in Windsor. WRCH broadcasts in the HD Radio hybrid format. It offered smooth jazz programming on its formerly HD2 sub-channel. The HD3 sub-channel formerly carried a simulcast of sports talk-formatted WEEI-FM in Boston.

== History ==
=== Beautiful music ===
On July 1, 1968, WRCH-FM signed on the air. It was the FM counterpart of WRCH (910 AM, now WLAT). Both were owned by Central Connecticut Broadcasting, itself owned by Aldo DeDominicis. While the AM station aired a full service, middle of the road format, WRCH-FM carried a beautiful music format. It played quarter-hour sweeps of mostly instrumental cover versions of pop songs and Hollywood and Broadway showtunes. Easy listening was a popular format in that era, with several stations in the Hartford area also playing beautiful music, including WWYZ, WKSS, WKCI and WTIC-FM. Over time, as those stations switched to other formats, WRCH continued its easy listening sound.

In 1977, WRCH-FM and its AM sister station WRCQ, were acquired by the Radio Corporation of Hartford, controlled by Enzo DeDominicis (nephew of Aldo DeDominicis) and Connecticut School of Broadcasting owner Nicholas Robinson, for $3 million; Robinson sold his stake to DeDominicis in 1979.

=== Soft AC ===
In the 1980s, WRCH gradually increased the number of soft vocals and decreased the instrumentals, to the point where it became a soft adult contemporary station. The transition was gradual. Many of its listeners stuck with WRCH as a companion in the office and at home, and it remained one of the top rated stations in Greater Hartford.

Enzo DeDominicis sold WRCH, along with AM sister station WNEZ, to American Radio Systems (ARS) in December 1993. The $15 million acquisition, completed in July 1994, was the first made by ARS following its formation a month earlier. It placed WRCH under the same ownership as WZMX, which offered a "bright adult contemporary" format. Ahead of the sale, DeDominicis relocated to South Carolina to oversee his two radio stations there, which he had acquired in 1989.

=== CBS and Entercom ===
Westinghouse Electric Corporation, then-parent company of CBS Radio, announced its acquisition of ARS in September 1997, a deal completed in June 1998. By this time, the company's holdings in the market, in addition to WRCH and WZMX, included WTIC (AM) and WTIC-FM; WNEZ had been sold to Mega Broadcasting in 1996. WRCH continued its soft AC format, although picking up the tempo a bit into the 2000s, shifting to mainstream adult contemporary music.

On February 2, 2017, CBS Radio announced it would merge with Entercom. The merger was approved on November 9, 2017, and was consummated on November 17. The only noticeable effect from the merger for listeners was the switch of Boston sports stations on WRCH's HD3 subchannel, as the simulcast changed from the now-Beasley-owned WBZ-FM to Entercom-owned WEEI-FM.

In 2021, Entercom changed its name to Audacy, Inc. Audacy discontinued WRCH's HD subchannels in 2022.
