= WTIC-FM =

Hot adult contemporary radio station in Hartford, Connecticut

- Hartford, Connecticut; United States
- Broadcast area: Greater Hartford
- Frequency: 96.5 MHz (HD Radio)
- Branding: 96.5 TIC

Programming
- Language: English
- Format: Hot adult contemporary
- Subchannels: HD2: Talk radio (WTIC)

Ownership
- Owner: Audacy, Inc.; (Audacy License, LLC)
- Sister stations: WRCH; WTIC; WZMX

History
- First air date: February 5, 1940
- Former call signs: W1XSO (1940–1941); W53H (1941–1943)
- Former frequencies: 43.5 MHz (1940–1941); 45.3 MHz (1941–1948)
- Call sign meaning: Travelers Insurance Company (former owner)

Technical information
- Licensing authority: FCC
- Facility ID: 66465
- Class: B
- ERP: 20,000 watts
- HAAT: 247 meters (810 ft)
- Transmitter coordinates: 41.774°N 72.805°W

Links
- Public license information: Public file; LMS
- Webcast: Listen live (via Audacy); Listen live (via iHeartRadio)
- Website: www.audacy.com/965tic

WTIC-FM (96.5 MHz) is a commercial FM radio station in Hartford, Connecticut. It is owned by Audacy, Inc. and broadcasts a hot adult contemporary radio format. The station's studios and offices are located on Addison Road in Windsor.

WTIC-FM has an effective radiated power (ERP) of 20,000 watts, with its signal heard throughout most of Connecticut and into Western Massachusetts. Its transmitter is located off Deercliff Road in Avon, the same site as sister station WTIC (AM) and former co-owned TV station WFSB. WTIC-FM broadcasts in the HD Radio (hybrid) format. The HD2 subchannel carries the news/talk format of WTIC (AM).

== History ==
=== Early years ===
WTIC-FM is the second oldest FM station in Hartford, after WHCN. They were the only pre-World War II FM stations in Connecticut, with WTIC-FM signing on the air originally as W1XSO on February 5, 1940, and using a frequency of 43.5 MHz. In December 1941, it became a commercial operation using the call sign W53H. In 1943, the call letters were changed to WTIC-FM, representing its original owner, The Travelers Insurance Company. On April 17, 1948, the station moved to 96.5 MHz where it has remained to this day.

It mostly simulcast WTIC in its early years, carrying WTIC's local shows and NBC Radio Network programming, during the 1940s and 1950s. Just like their AM sister station, it carried NBC's dramas, comedies, news, sports, soap operas, game shows and big band broadcasts during the "Golden Age of Radio". As network programming moved from radio to television in the 1950s, WTIC-AM-FM switched to a full service, middle of the road format of popular music, news and sports. During the 1960s, WTIC-FM broke away from its AM counterpart for most of the day, playing classical music. In the early 1970s, it ran beautiful music by day and classical music at night.

=== Hot Hits ===
In 1974, Travelers Insurance sold the TV station to Post-Newsweek Stations while the radio stations were sold to a group of their managers, going by the name "The 1080 Corporation". On May 12, 1977, WTIC-FM made a dramatic switch by flipping to a Top 40–CHR format, as "Hot Hits".

=== Hot AC ===
From the mid-1980s to the early 1990s, WTIC-FM was locked in a Top 40/CHR battle with WKSS, which had converted from an easy listening station. WTIC-FM management decided not to aim as young as WKSS, removing the rap music and other harder edged songs from its playlist, switching to its current hot AC format on June 15, 1994. Initially, the station's playlist moved a bit softer; since then, the hot AC format as a whole has embraced more upbeat music, and so has the station. Since its days as a Top 40/CHR station in 1977, WTIC-FM has referred to itself on the air variously as "Your Music Connection 96 TICS WTIC FM", "96 TICS WTIC-FM", "Hot Hits! 96 TICS WTIC-FM", "96 TIC-FM", and "The New 96.5 TIC-FM".

In 1998, WTIC-AM-FM were acquired by Infinity Broadcasting, which was renamed CBS Radio in December 2005. CBS also acquired then-adult contemporary station WZMX (now rhythmic contemporary) and adult contemporary WRCH. On February 2, 2017, CBS Radio announced it would merge with Entercom. The merger was approved on November 9, 2017, and was consummated on November 17.
