= Bertelmann =

Bertelmann is a surname. Notable people with the surname include:

- Fred Bertelmann (1925–2014), German singer and actor
- Volker Bertelmann alias Hauschka (born 1966), German pianist and composer
- Richard Bertelmann (1931–2023), American radio and television personality and broadcasting executive professionally known as Dick Bertel

== See also ==
- Bertelsmann, German multinational mass media corporation
