= WNBC (disambiguation) =

WNBC (channel 4) is the flagship station of the NBC television network, located in New York City.

WNBC may also refer to:

- WFAN, a radio station (660 AM) in New York City, which held the call sign WNBC from 1946 to 1954 and from 1960 to 1988
- WQHT, a radio station (97.1 FM) in New York City, which held the call sign WNBC-FM from 1946 to 1954 and from 1960 to 1975
- WVIT, a television station (channel 30) in New Britain, Connecticut, which held the call sign WNBC from 1956 to 1960
- WPOP, a radio station (1410 AM) in Hartford, Connecticut, which held the call sign WNBC from 1935 to 1944
