= WKSS =

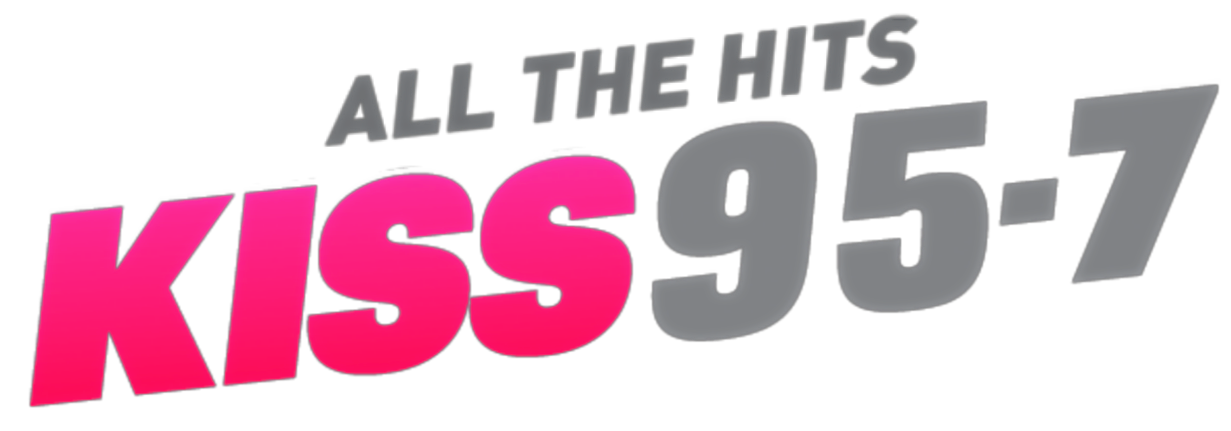
- Hartford–Meriden, Connecticut; United States
- Broadcast area: Greater Hartford
- Frequency: 95.7 MHz (HD Radio)
- Branding: Kiss 95-7

Programming
- Language: English
- Format: Contemporary hit radio
- Subchannels: HD2: Pride Radio
- Affiliations: Premiere Networks

Ownership
- Owner: iHeartMedia, Inc.; (iHM Licenses, LLC)
- Sister stations: WHCN; WPOP; WUCS; WWYZ

History
- First air date: December 6, 1947
- Former call signs: WMMW-FM (1947–1960); WBMI (1960–1971)
- Call sign meaning: Kiss

Technical information
- Licensing authority: FCC
- Facility ID: 53384
- Class: B
- ERP: 16,500 watts
- HAAT: 268 meters (879 ft)
- Transmitter coordinates: 41°33′41.4″N 72°50′37.4″W

Links
- Public license information: Public file; LMS
- Webcast: Listen live (via iHeartRadio)
- Website: kiss957.iheart.com

WKSS (95.7 FM) is a radio station operated by iHeartMedia, Inc. in the Greater Hartford area. It broadcasts from its original transmitter site located in Meriden on West Peak in the Hanging Hills, and has a rare dual city of license of Hartford–Meriden.

Airing a mainstream top 40 format, the station is currently branded as KISS 95-7 with the slogan "All The Hits". Its studios and offices are located on Columbus Boulevard in Hartford.

WKSS broadcasts in the HD Radio format.

== History ==
=== Early years as WMMW-FM (1945–1960) ===
During World War II, the Silver City Crystal Co., the first licensee of the station that would become WKSS, was one of at least 150 American enterprises that designed and manufactured quartz crystal oscillating devices that use the mechanical resonance of a vibrating crystal of piezoelectric material such as quartz to create an electrical signal with a very precise frequency, making the timing of a clock or watch as well as the tuning of broadcast transmitters and receivers consistent and reliable. Since tuned circuits, the predecessor to the oscillating crystal, would allow frequencies to drift by as much as 4 kHz, crystal devices and the broadcast equipment in which they were installed became essential components of the military build-up during the war because they could maintain constant communication and coordination in the field.

The principal owner of the Silver City companies was Carl A. Schultz, a native of Oslo, Norway, and a veteran of World War I. His son Carl W. "Buzz" Schultz managed the stations.

As the wartime ban on licensing new stations was lifted, the Silver City Crystal Co. applied to the Federal Communications Commission for construction permits for AM (amplitude modulation) and FM radio licenses in Meriden. The FCC authorized the station that would become WMMW (AM) on October 8, 1945. During the week of December 31, 1945 – January 4, 1946, it authorized WMMW-FM, the station that would become WKSS 25 years later.

The launch of WMMW, which is assigned to operate at 1470 kHz, was delayed by hearings before the FCC involving companies that also held licenses for nearby stations that operate on that same regional frequency: a construction permit for WLAM in Lewiston, Maine, held by the Lewiston-Auburn Broadcasting Corporation and an existing station, WSAN in Allentown, Pennsylvania, owned and operated by the Lehigh Valley Broadcasting Co. Ultimately WMMW began broadcasting on June 8, 1947. On December 6, 1947, the station increased its power to 20,000 watts.

It appealed immediately to advertisers, reporting that it was already operating highly profitably with its first monthly billing reaching $135,000, all from local businesses. Within a few weeks, it was busy producing a series of tributes to Connie Mack (1862–1956), the celebrated Major League Baseball manager, as he and his Philadelphia Athletics descended on Meriden to honor the 63rd anniversary of "The Grand Old Man of Baseball" stepping to home plate in his first game as a professional player there (on July 1, 1884) with a parade, banquet, and exhibition game against the Insilcos, the city's semi-pro club.

As typical for the time, finalization of the FM signal lagged behind the priority of getting its AM counterpart up and running. It did not actually sign-on to broadcast until sometime in November or December. But over the years, the first broadcast date of the FM station has been conflated with the June 8, 1947, birth date of the WMMW Radio enterprise as a whole, perhaps partly because the precise late autumn date for the launch of WMMW-FM itself has apparently been lost to history.

By the start of 1948, however, WMMW-FM was simulcasting the programming on WMMW (AM) with an ERP of 7,000 watts. The stations' schedule had a variety of programs. One was the daily half-hour Polka Time hosted by Jim Dunham, who insisted that the residents of "PT Ville" submit their mailed record requests in rhyming verse. (Three letters would entitle the sender to membership in the "Polka Club".) Setting the example, he would open each show with the salutation, "Greetings, mates! Let's congregate. It's time to polka-palpitate."

Another program was Swap Shop. Monroe "Bill" Benton, moderating the show as the shop's "proprietor", would connect listeners who phoned into the program to exchange offers for trades. The show unexpectedly created a sensational story on June 2, 1948, when a woman named Nellie Wolan called to swap her $14,000 six-bedroom house at 125 Pearl Street in Middletown, Connecticut for marriage to a man who must "earn [at least] $5,000 a year, [be] tall, dark, and good looking, and be very affectionate 'because I like a lot of loving.'" Speaking from the studio on June 4, she provided more detailed expectations for her "dream man" and opened two of the letters expressing interest since she first proffered matrimony to eligible bachelors. Benton continued to share further updates with his audience over subsequent days. A United Press International (UPI) report transformed the unemployed typist into an international human interest story, inundating Wolan with over 400 letters, telegrams, and phone calls from suitors across the United States and Canada as well as from Australia, England, France, and Spain.

She dated several of the men who contacted her after they passed an interview over the phone. "And I'm on a party line," she told the UPI. "The neighbors all listen in. It's embarrassing." Nonetheless, one New London candidate whom she quickly began to favor turned out to be already married to someone else. In fact, none of the applicants would ever receive a proposal. Immediately after her son Howard (1950–2001) was born on November 13, 1950, with cerebral palsy, she filed a paternity lawsuit against a traveling salesman from Providence, Rhode Island. By that time, she had determined that offering to swap her house for a husband had been a poor decision. "A girl can't find the right man that way," she told the Bridgeport Sunday Herald. Her persistent lack of income was also forcing her to consider selling the house itself. In the end, she would never marry anyone.

The stations also participated in the radio industry's annual campaign to drive contributions to the March of Dimes charity. During one afternoon in 1949 for example, items donated by local merchants were auctioned by telephone to the audience for a total of $1,000. They estimated they received 500 bids.

Together with WMMW (AM), WMMW-FM's first main studios and offices occupied the entire fifth (top) floor of the landmark 1870 Palace Block building at 8 1/2 W. Main Street (at the intersection with Hanover Street) in Meriden, Connecticut. They also had a studio at 505 Main Street in Middletown, Connecticut. After the Palace Block burned to the ground on February 26, 1957, the stations were temporarily removed to facilities at the FM transmitter site.

New studios were built in Meriden, Connecticut inside a former pump house at 122 Charles Street at a four-acre industrial site that runs along Parker Avenue. Listed on the National Register of Historic Places as the Meriden Curtain Fixture Company Factory since 1986, the pump house and the adjoining factory buildings were built in 1892 by the Charles Parker Co. When WMMW and WMMW-FM were there, however, the complex was home to the Silver City Glass Co. and its offspring, the Silver City Crystal Co.

==== Functional music format ====
Over the course of 1948 the stations' engineers worked to increase the ERP of WMMW-FM to 20 kW, receiving a few construction permit extensions along the way. At the same time, many other authorized operators were returning their FM licenses to the FCC citing the poor post-war economy and the slow sales of FM receivers to consumers, due partly to the new demand for television sets among the public. But the Silver City Crystal Company was making arrangements to use WMMW-FM for a commercial purpose that would define the station throughout the 1950s.

===== Muzak Origins of Functional Music =====
As radio broadcasting got underway in the 1920s, an entrepreneur named George Owen Squier (1865–1934), a major general in charge of the U.S. Army Signal Corps, invented a method to deliver music over leased telephone lines on a subscription basis. Founding "Wired Radio, Inc." in 1922 in conjunction with the North American Company, then the country's largest utility company, Squier changed the name to "Muzak" in 1934 shortly before his death. (The name was retired in 2013 when the organization was assimilated by its holding company, Mood Media.) After struggling to find a market in consumers' homes, Muzak eventually determined that its service was better suited for retail, manufacturing, and similar business environments.

Muzak developed its own recording standards that they began to characterize as "functional music". Functional music was designed for environments such as assembly lines to stimulate and maximize productivity with increases in tempo as well as deliberate periods of silence that would help to keep the workers aware of the music and their rhythms when they returned. Many American factories making equipment for the war effort used the Muzak service in their facilities.

Using telephone lines gave Muzak the freedom to indulge in these pauses and play music without any announcements or other interruptions. They regarded this as a key differentiator from their radio broadcasting counterparts which were obligated by FCC regulations to have licensed operators on duty during all broadcasting hours and air proper legal identification. Furthermore, since radio could not limit its service to paid subscribers, carrying advertising was essential for any station's financial viability. Radio simply could not match the model that Muzak was able to exploit.

===== Storecasting Corporation of America =====
By 1945, an attorney and advertising executive named Stanley Joseloff had become fascinated with the retail operations of grocery stores. In fact, as the concept of the supermarket was introduced and continued to evolve, Joseloff would patent several methods for product displays and checkout processes. He also possessed a deep background in theatrical and radio entertainment, having worked as a lawyer for brothers Lee and Jacob J. Shubert, the founders of Manhattan's Broadway district, and as a producer for the popular radio shows The Life of Riley on CBS and Time to Smile starring Eddie Cantor on NBC. He was also a successful songwriter, sharing authorship with Sidney Lippman for the "girl back home number" Dear Arabella, a minor hit for The Glenn Miller Orchestra in 1941.

Joseloff envisioned using Muzak to provide functional music to grocery stores. But unlike the music-only concept in which Muzak had invested itself, he believed in carrying spoken-word announcements to advertise brands and broaden product awareness during the shopping experience. He founded his own business, Storecasting Corporation of America, around this concept.

In 1945, the Storecast service debuted to fifteen First National grocery stores (later renamed "Finast") in greater Hartford through the local Muzak franchise. Although not without some initial technical difficulties, the service soon expanded to grocery store chains in other major American population centers. Libby's, Coca-Cola, Swift, General Foods, and reportedly sixty other national and regional accounts became satisfied Storecast advertisers. "Our record of advertising renewals is excellent," Joseloff crowed to the FM Association convention in Chicago on September 28, 1948. "We have increased average sales of all of our accounts by at least 60%."

Nonetheless, Storecast's limitation to point-of-sale messaging could not fulfill its advertisers' needs for reach and frequency. To solve this, Storecast partnered with stations such as The Hartford Times' simulcast of WTHT (merged with WONS in 1954 to form WGTH, today WPOP) and WTHT-FM (dark since 1950) and Seaboard Radio Broadcasting's Philadelphia simulcast of WIBG and WIBG-FM to carry some of its advertisers' commercials. By this time, Storecast had added the American Stores Co. and the National Tea Co. to its grocery empire of wired sound, reputedly 235 stores in all.

Still, Storecast was frustrated with the Muzak franchise delivery system. Leased lines were expensive, prone to disruption, and not available in all locations. Joseloff had concluded that Storecast should conclude its Muzak operation and migrate to a radio broadcasting model instead.

Joseloff addressed the convention of the FM Association to announce that he had concluded an agreement with WHFC, Inc. to start broadcasting the Storecasting service over its FM station, WEHS. Beginning in October, approximately 100 National (Tea) Food stores around Chicago would access the service using receivers fixed to the 97.9 MHz frequency for WEHS although any listener with a standard FM receiver would, of course, be able to tune it in as well.

===== Storecast affiliation =====
Even as WTHT-AM-FM was carrying some of the Storecasting advertising schedules in Connecticut, by December 1948 Joseloff was finalizing arrangements with the Silver City Crystal Company to broadcast the Storecast service over WMMW-FM. By January 1949, Monroe Benton was promoted from news director for the WMMW Radio simulcast to be the first program director of the programmatically independent FM station, coinciding with the power increase to 20 kW on January 10.

=== As WBMI (1960–1971) ===
As part of a process of dissolving the Silver City Crystal Company which would be completed in 1961, starting in 1960 changes were made to both WMMW stations, primarily to keep the FM station within control of the Schultz family. During the week June 16–22, 1960, the FCC authorized the company's request to change the call letters from WMMW-FM to WBMI. On August 30, 1960, Silver City sold WMMW (AM) to Meriden – Wallingford Radio, Inc. And on July 27, 1961, ownership of WBMI was formally transferred to Business Music, Inc. (not to be confused with Broadcast Music, Inc., the music licensing company that commonly uses the acronym BMI), a new firm led by Buzz Schultz.

On May 1, 1962, WBMI became one of the first stations to broadcast in stereo after the FCC standardized the multiplex system.

On March 21, 1963, Business Music, Inc. applied to the FCC for permission to change the city of license for WBMI from Meriden to the combination of Hartford Meriden. When the commission granted this unusual request on October 30, 1963, it also waived the requirement that the station's main studio be maintained in Meriden, Connecticut.

=== As a beautiful music station (1971–1984) ===
On May 1, 1971, Communico, Inc. acquired WBMI from Business Music, Inc. for $426,500. Moving quickly, it changed the call letters to WKSS on May 23, 1971 and during the week June 20–26, 1971 relocated the station from 122 Charles Street in Meriden, Connecticut to the 1893 Queen Anne style Borden-Munsill mansion in Hartford, Connecticut which faces the South Green Historic District from 2 Wethersfield Avenue (at the intersection with Wyllys Street).

On February 17, 1977, Insilco Broadcasting purchased WKSS for $1,689,500 and in 1978 installed Tom Durney as general manager, his first such position. To oversee programming and operations, he recruited Dick Bertel, a broadcaster well known in Connecticut after having worked on-air since 1956 for the formerly combined facilities of WTIC Radio and Channel 3 (then WTIC-TV, now WFSB) in Hartford. Augmenting the instrumental beautiful music with some light vocals, personality-driven engagement, and a news and sports department, Bertel hosted the weekday AM drive program "Good Morning, New England" and filled the schedule with other popular hosts including Jim Perry (also the chief engineer), Mike Ogden, Jon Stevens, Steve Vallensky, Greg Williams, Roxanne Dorey [Flanders], Bob Ellsworth, Jim Austin, Douglas Richards, and Scott Vowinkle (known on-air as Scott Evans), a few of whom were also veterans of WTIC. While Durney and Bertel's strategy included attracting a significant share of the station's audience from market powerhouse WTIC (AM) (which was transitioning from a Middle-of-the-Road (MOR), music and information format into pure news/talk), WKSS' chief rival then was WRCH, another FM outlet playing beautiful music in Hartford, Connecticut.

On January 26, 1981, Insilco sold WKSS to Marlin Broadcasting for $2,200,000 and transferred Durney to New Orleans to be the vice president and general manager of WQUE-FM, WGSO, and the Insilco Sports Network (appointing him less than a year later to executive vice president of the company's entire FM division). In response, Marlin's president Howard "Woody" Tanger elevated Bertel to be vice president and general manager of WKSS, a position he held while continuing to host the morning drive program. Adopting the slogans "The Good Music Station with Personality" and "A Kiss is More Than Just a Kiss", WKSS performed well in the ratings and in revenue share while owned by Insilco and Marlin, making it possible in 1982 to move from the mansion to a fourteen-story office building located in Downtown Hartford at 60 Washington Street (at the corner of Buckingham Street), occupying street-level offices and studios. (Built in 1966, the building was imploded by the State of Connecticut on January 28, 2001, due to an asbestos health hazard.)

=== As a top 40 station (1984–present) ===
In October 1984, concert promoter Don Law, Tim Montgomery, and Bob Mitchell, formed Precision Media to purchase WKSS for $3,430,000, and flipped its format to a contemporary hit radio as "95.7 The New Kiss FM". In the Fall of 1989, "95.7 Kiss FM" became "Kiss 95.7", and began shifting toward a dance-leaning CHR format.

In addition to WKCI-FM "KC101" in New Haven, Connecticut, J.B. Wilde programmed WKSS through March 2015, when he was promoted by iHeartMedia to assume the program director role for both KDWB-FM, and KTCZ-FM "Cities 97.1" in Minneapolis–Saint Paul.

On May 16, 2023, WKCI-FM midday host Adam Rivers was promoted to the station's program director.
