= WPKX (disambiguation) =

WPKX is a radio station (930 AM) licensed to serve Rochester, New Hampshire

WPKX may also refer to:

- WUCS, a radio station (97.9 FM) licensed to serve Windsor Locks, Connecticut, United States, which held the call sign WPKX from 1990 to 2012
- WTNT (AM), a radio station licensed to serve Alexandria, Virginia, which held the call sign WPKX from 1980 to 1982 and 1983 to 1987
