= Robert H. Steele =

American politician (born 1938)

Robert Steele
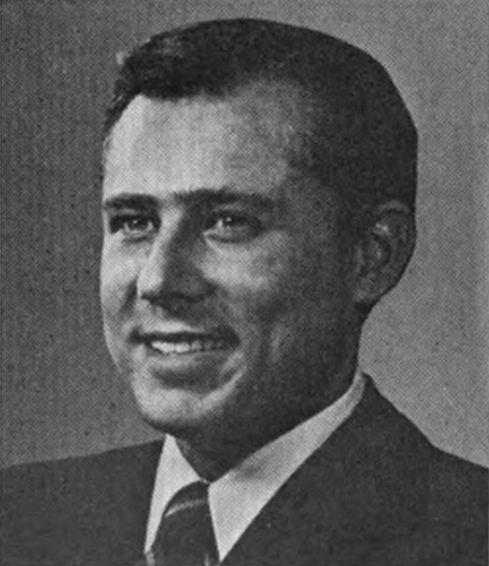

Member of the U.S. House of Representatives from Connecticut's 2nd district
- In office November 3, 1970 – January 3, 1975
- Preceded by: William St. Onge
- Succeeded by: Chris Dodd

Personal details
- Born: Robert Hampton Steele; November 3, 1938 (age 87) Hartford, Connecticut, U.S.
- Party: Republican
- Spouse: Ann Truex (m. 1961)
- Children: 4
- Relatives: Bob Steele (father)
- Education: Amherst College (BA); Columbia University (MA)

Robert Hampton Steele (born November 3, 1938) is a retired American politician and author from the state of Connecticut. A Republican, Steele served in the U.S. House of Representatives from 1970 to 1975.

== Early life and education ==
Robert Hampton Steele was born in Hartford, Connecticut on November 3, 1938. His father, known as Bob Steele, was host of the state's top-rated morning show on WTIC-AM for more than fifty years.

Steele attended public schools in Wethersfield, Connecticut and obtained a Bachelor of Arts from Amherst College, Massachusetts in 1960. He earned a master's degree from Columbia University in 1963.

== Career ==
Steele "spent five years as a Soviet expert in the Central Intelligence Agency in Washington and Mexico". Between 1968 and 1970, Steele worked as a securities analyst for the Travelers Insurance Company.

Steele was a Republican member of the United States House of Representatives for the Connecticut's 2nd congressional district from 1970 to 1975. He was elected simultaneously to the Ninety-first and to the Ninety-second Congresses in a 1970 special election to fill a vacancy; that vacancy was caused by the death of Democratic United States Representative William L. St. Onge. Steele won the 1970 special election despite running in a district where Democrats outnumbered Republicans.

Steele was re-elected to the Ninety-third Congress by 68,000 votes. In Congress, he developed a moderate-to-liberal record that featured opposition to the Vietnam War.

Steele did not seek re-election to the Ninety-fourth Congress in 1974; instead, he ran for Governor of Connecticut. In the wake of the Watergate scandal, Steele emphasized his support for campaign reform and pledged not to accept political contributions exceeding $100. Steele's gubernatorial campaign was unsuccessful.

Steele is an anti-gambling expert. In 2012, he published The Curse: Big-Time Gambling's Seduction of a Small New England Town.

U.S. House of Representatives
Preceded by William St. Onge	Member of the U.S. House of Representatives from Connecticut's 2nd congressional district 1970–1975	Succeeded by Chris Dodd
Party political offices
Preceded by Thomas Meskill	Republican nominee for Governor of Connecticut; 1974	Succeeded by Ronald A. Sarasin
U.S. order of precedence (ceremonial)
Preceded by Marjorie Taylor Greene as Former U.S. Representative	Order of precedence of the United States as Former U.S. Representative	Succeeded by Peter Blute as Former U.S. Representative
