= William St. Onge =

American politician (1914–1970)

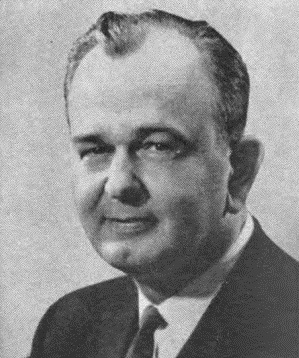

Member of the U.S. House of Representatives from Connecticut's 2nd district
- In office January 3, 1963 – May 1, 1970
- Preceded by: Horace Seely-Brown Jr.
- Succeeded by: Robert H. Steele

Personal details
- Born: October 9, 1914 Putnam, Connecticut, U.S.
- Died: May 1, 1970 (aged 55) Groton, Connecticut, U.S
- Party: Democratic
- Education: Tufts University; University of Connecticut

Military service
- Allegiance: United States of America
- Branch/service: United States Army
- Years of service: 1942–1945

William Leon St. Onge (October 9, 1914 – May 1, 1970) was a United States representative from Connecticut.

== Career ==
He was born in Putnam, Windham County, Connecticut, and attended the secondary schools of Putnam. He graduated from Tufts University in 1941 and enlisted in the United States Army in 1942, serving in the Army Air Corps in North Africa and Europe, and was discharged as a flight engineer in September 1945. He then attended the University of Connecticut School of Law at Hartford in 1948, and was admitted to the bar in 1948. He commenced the practice of law in Putnam in 1948, becoming judge of the probate court from 1948 to 1962.

He was a member of board of education of Putnam in 1939–1941, and served in the State House of Representatives in 1941–1942. He served as prosecutor of the city court of Putnam from 1949 to 1951, and in 1955 he became judge of the city court of Putnam, serving until 1961. He was chairman and executive director of the redevelopment agency of Putnam, 1956–1958, and was mayor of the city in 1961–1962.

In 1962 he was elected as a Democrat to the Eighty-eighth and to the three succeeding Congresses, serving from January 3, 1963, until his death from a heart attack in Groton, Connecticut in 1970. His body was interred in St. Mary's Cemetery, Putnam. He was succeeded as Representative by Robert H. Steele.

== See also ==
- List of members of the American Legion
- List of members of the United States Congress who died in office (1950–1999)

U.S. House of Representatives
Preceded by Horace Seely-Brown	United States Representative for the 2nd Congressional District of Connecticut; 1963–1970	Succeeded by Robert H. Steele
