= Lou Lumenick =

American film critic (born 1949)

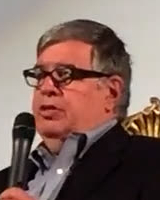
- Lou Lumenick in 2015
- Born: Louis J. Lumenick; September 11, 1949 (age 76); Astoria, Queens, United States
- Occupation: Film critic

Louis J. Lumenick (born September 11, 1949) is a retired American film critic. He was the chief film critic and film editor for the New York Post where he reviewed films from 1999 until his retirement in 2016.

== Life and career ==
Lumenick was born and raised in Astoria, Queens. He attended City College of New York (CCNY) and took filmmaking courses at The New School. He previously worked at The Hartford Times, a defunct newspaper in Connecticut, and The Record in New Jersey, reviewing films over a nine-year span for the latter. He was metropolitan editor at the Post before taking the film reviewer position.

In 2007 he was inducted into the CCNY Communications Hall of Fame. He is a member of the New York Film Critics Circle. Lumenick and Farran Smith Nehme conceived and created "Shadows of Russia," a 20-film series that aired in January, 2010, on Turner Classic Movies. He also appeared as an on-air TCM guest programmer in October 2010 as part of the Critic's Choice film series, introducing The Last Flight and All Through the Night with Robert Osborne. His essay on It's a Mad, Mad, Mad, Mad World is included in The Criterion Collection's January 2014 release of the film. Lumenick has introduced films at the United Palace (the former Loews 175th Street) in Washington Heights, Manhattan, as well as at the Museum of Modern Art, the Museum of the Moving Image, Loews Jersey and at the TCM Classic Film Festival in Hollywood. He has also recorded introductions for DVD releases of several classic films for the Troma Team's Roan Group label.
