= Edmund S. Valtman =

Estonian-American cartoonist (1914–2005)

Edmund Siegfried Valtman
- Born: May 31, 1914; Tallinn, Governorate of Estonia, Russian Empire
- Died: January 12, 2005 (aged 90); Bloomfield, Connecticut
- Occupation: Cartoonist
- Known for: Pulitzer Prize for Editorial Cartooning (1962)

Edmund Siegfried Valtman (May 31, 1914 – January 12, 2005) was an Estonian-American editorial cartoonist and the winner of the 1962 Pulitzer Prize for Editorial Cartooning.

== Early life ==
Born in Tallinn, Estonia to Juhan and Elisabeth (née Kukk) Valtman, Edmund sold his first cartoons when he was 15 to the children's magazine Laste Rõõm. He also created his first cartoon at 15. He had seen his older brother draw as well as his father make cakes and cookies with designs on them (Juhan was a baker).

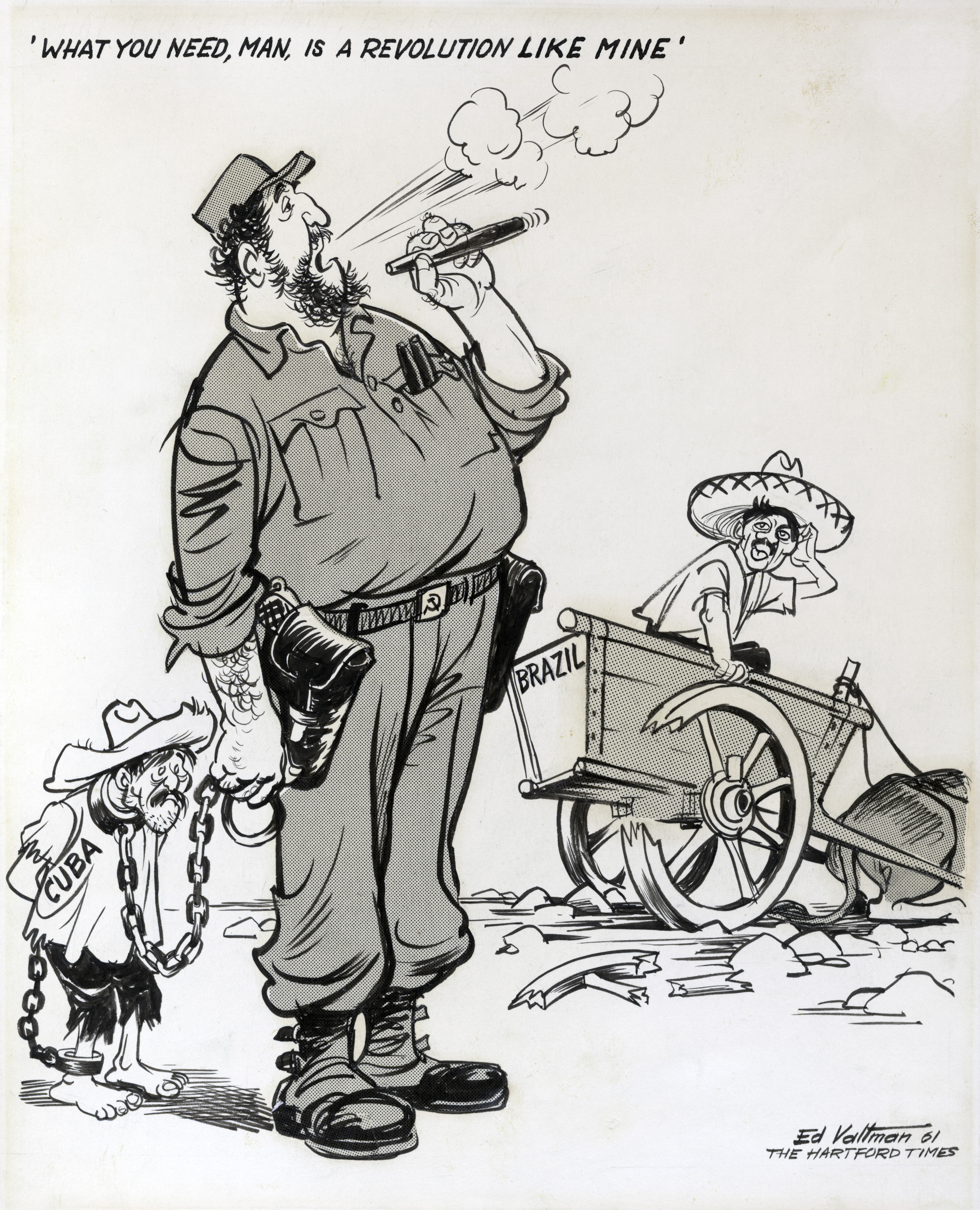
Valtman's Pulitzer Prize-winning cartoon, August 1961

Edmund Valtman worked as an editorial cartoonist for the newspapers Eesti Sõna and Maa Sõna under the moniker Vallot and studied at the Tallinn Art and Applied Art School. When the USSR reoccupied Estonia in 1944, he and his wife, Helmi (who was Estonian) fled the country with retreating Nazi troops and then spent the next four years in displaced persons camps in Germany including one in Geislingen. The camps were still under the control of Allied occupation forces. They emigrated to the United States in 1949, first to Little Silver east of Red Bank, New Jersey and then to Hartford, Connecticut.

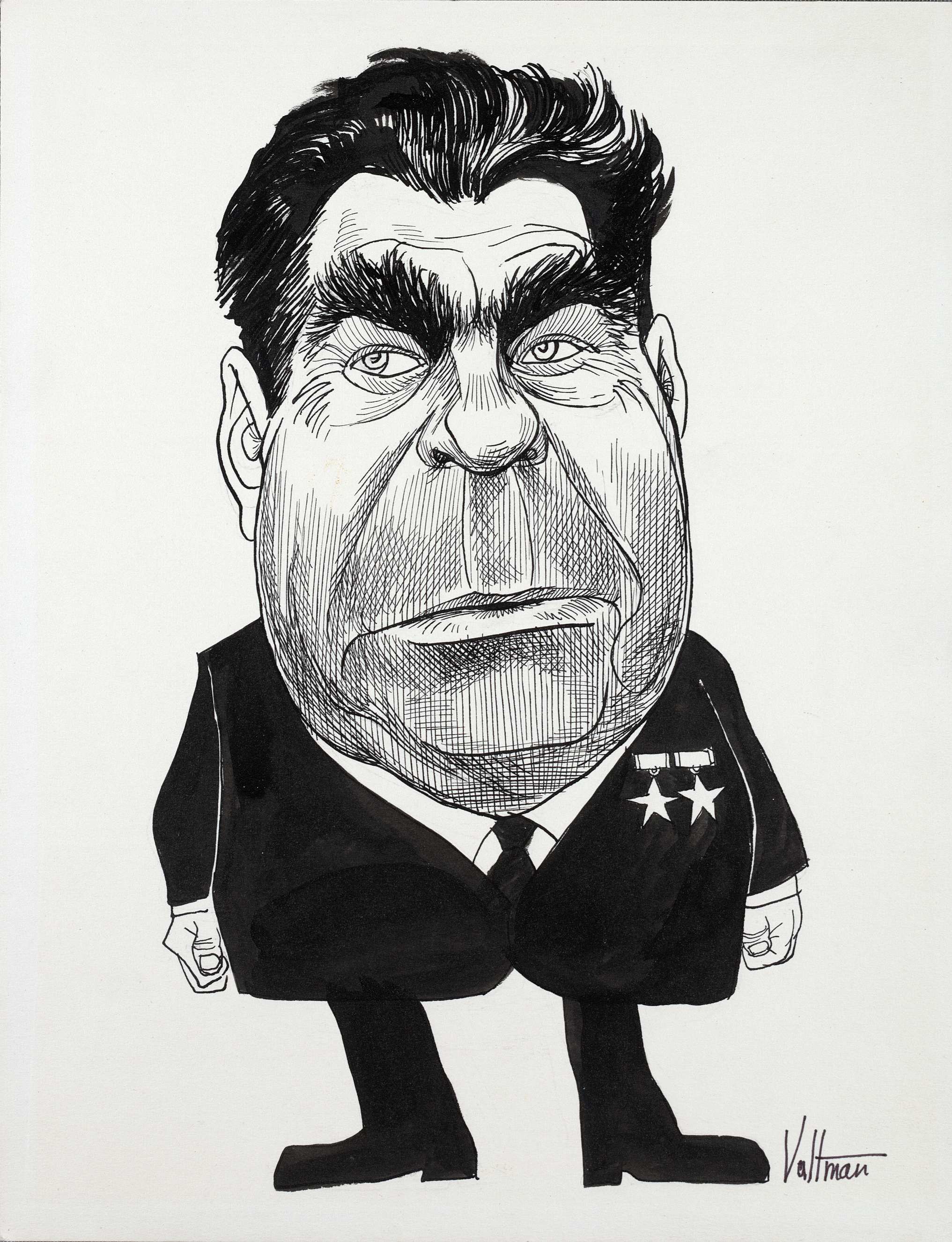
Caricature of Leonid Brezhnev by Valtman, 1968

== Career ==
Valtman was a cartoonist for The Hartford Times from 1951 until his retirement in 1975 and Helmi began working in insurance at the same time. He was noted for his caricatures of Cold War–era communist leaders including Nikita Khrushchev and Leonid Brezhnev. He won the Pulitzer Prize for an August 31, 1961 cartoon showing Fidel Castro leading a shackled, beaten-down man representing Cuba and advising Brazil "What You Need, Man, Is a Revolution Like Mine!"

Valtman died in a retirement home in Bloomfield, Connecticut.
