= James Britton (painter) =

American painter

James Britton, American painter (1878–1936), born in Hartford, Connecticut. Trained as a realist painter with noted Connecticut artist Charles Noel Flagg, he worked for a short period as staff artist for The Hartford Times, and then as an art critic for The Hartford Courant.

Britton was a prolific painter, earning his living for the most part from painting portraits and for his pleasure landscapes, as well as woodblock prints and drawings. He was also often short of money, which meant that instead of being able to buy new canvases for his work he simply painted over what he happened to have at hand. Among his surviving works are several paintings on cereal boxes and in one case a small egg carton, as well as a large number of very small postcard-sized landscapes .

He painted at various times in his native Connecticut, New York City, and Sag Harbor. As well as being a painter in his own right, he was also an organizer of artists and art students, in Connecticut being one of the founders of the Connecticut Art Students League. In New York he was one of the founders of a group called The Eclectics, with whom he exhibited regularly.

In his years in New York he occasionally worked as art critic for the weekly American Art News. And to reflect his interest in getting out the news on American painters, whom he believed to be substantially unknown and under-appreciated by the art world and public alike, in 1919 he created, edited and published an art periodical, Art Review International, which lasted until 1925. As a critic for American Art News, he reviewed contemporary events such as the [Armory Show] of 1913.

Britton had three children: James Jerome, born 1915; Teresa, born 1916; and Ruth born in 1919. In 1928 he was involved in a traffic accident, seriously injuring his hip and leaving his mobility compromised. He died on April 16, 1936, at the age of fifty-eight.

His work has been the object of some revival in recent years.

Sag Harbor Studio, oil on canvas, 24x36, 1925 (Including portraits of the artist and of his wife Caroline)
