= WTHT (Connecticut) =

Radio station in Hartford, Connecticut (1936–1954)

- Hartford, Connecticut; United States
- Frequency: 1230 kHz

Programming
- Affiliations: Mutual Broadcasting System (1936–1945); ABC (1945–1954)

Ownership
- Owner: The Hartford Times

History
- First air date: August 12, 1936
- Last air date: February 13, 1954
- Former frequencies: 1200 kHz (1936–1941); WTHT-FM: 106.1 MHz (1948–1950)

Technical information
- Power: 250 watts

WTHT was a radio station in Hartford, Connecticut, United States, that operated from 1936 to 1954. It was owned by The Hartford Times, the city's afternoon daily newspaper. As a result of the merger of WTHT with WONS, which brought the companies together in anticipation of building a television station, WTHT closed on February 15, 1954, and its programs were merged with WONS as WGTH on the WONS frequency. Its studios on 555 Asylum Street were converted into television facilities for WGTH-TV (channel 18), which debuted later that year. The 1230 frequency was occupied by Manchester, Connecticut–based WINF beginning in 1958.

== History ==
WTHT began broadcasting on August 12, 1936. It was affiliated with the Mutual Broadcasting System and the Inter-City regional radio network. WTHT broadcast on 1200 kHz with 100 watts during daylight hours only, and received approval in principle for nighttime broadcasting in 1936 when the Federal Communications Commission (FCC) moved to dismiss an application for an outlet at Newport, Rhode Island, for failure to construct. The news was well received by Hartford advertisers; the city's two other stations, WTIC and WDRC, were sold out, leaving no nighttime advertising inventory available. The nighttime authorization was finalized by the FCC in May 1937. On March 29, 1941, WTHT and other stations on 1200 kHz moved to 1230 kHz as part of the implementation of NARBA.

In 1945, WTHT switched affiliations to the Blue Network/ABC, with Mutual moving to 5,000-watt station WHTD, which later eliminated confusion with WTHT by renaming itself WONS. Later that year, it moved into the former Factory Insurance Building, a four-story structure at 555 Asylum Street, expanding from 4,000 square feet (370 m^{2}) in a building at 983 Main Street to 15,000 square feet (1,400 m^{2}). The station fought to upgrade by moving to 910 kHz with 5,000 watts while opposing a bid for a new station in Waterbury on 1240 kHz, which it believed would cause interference.

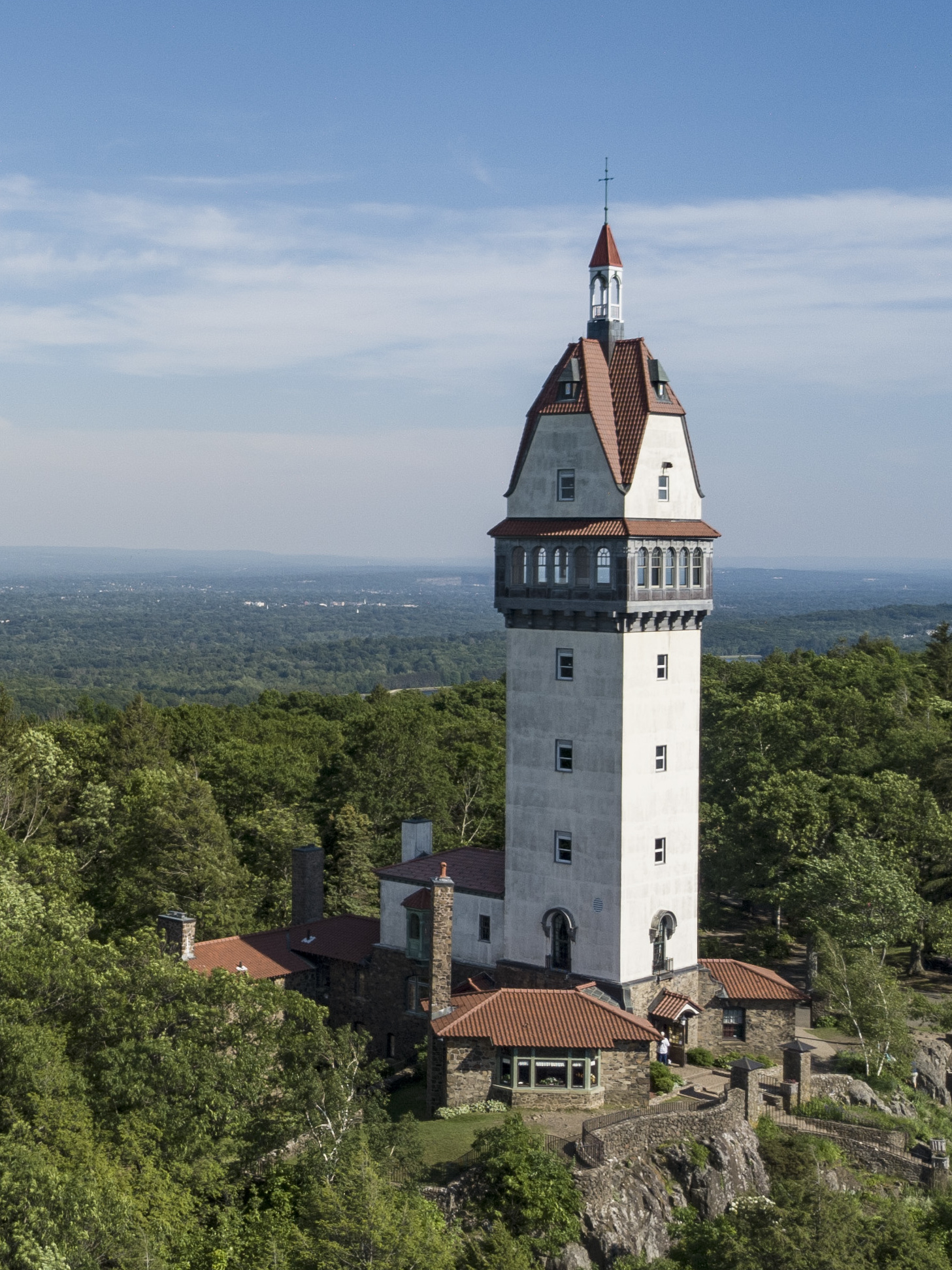
An FM antenna was mounted on the top of Heublein Tower for WTHT-FM, in operation from 1948 to 1950.

The station applied for an FM radio outlet in 1944. WTHT-FM began broadcasting on 106.1 MHz with tests on February 11 and full programming on March 29, 1948. Its transmitting facilities were on the Heublein Tower. It never received substantial interest from listeners. In 1949, its schedule was curtailed from 16 hours a day to nine; the license was surrendered for cancellation by The Times in February 1950. This occurred after the station was off the air for a week with technical issues but only one listener wrote to complain of the silence; the newspaper told the FCC, "We were consistently unable to demonstrate any sizable audience on FM."

=== Closure ===
When the FCC unfroze television station applications in 1952 after a multi-year pause, the Times was the first applicant for UHF channel 18. It had previously applied for a station prior to the freeze, competing with WTIC and WDRC. The second group to apply was WONS, owned by the General Tele-Radio Corporation and the city's Mutual Broadcasting System and Yankee Network outlet. WONS had been interested in television since 1947, when it applied for channel 3, at the time allocated to Springfield, Massachusetts; when channel 3 was reassigned to Hartford, the WONS application was dismissed. By September 1953, the FCC was ready to set up the hearings to determine winning applicants for the two Hartford allotments.

On October 20, 1953, WTHT and WONS announced they were merging their radio and television stations, clearing the way for channel 18 to be awarded to the new General-Times Television Corporation, owned 55 percent by General Tele-Radio. Consequently, on February 15, 1954, WTHT left the air; its programming and ABC was merged with WONS to become WGTH on February 13, 1954. The 555 Asylum facilities were converted for television use and housed WGTH-TV when it began broadcasting on September 25, 1954. In 1955, the Times sold its stake in the WGTH joint venture to General Tele-Radio, and WGTH-TV was sold to CBS, though the latter deal did not become final until September 1956.

== Reuse of 1230 kHz ==
After WTHT left the air, a number of applicants sought to use the 1230 frequency in Hartford, East Hartford, or Manchester. Brothers Broadcasting Company proposed a station in Hartford; Regional Broadcasting Company specified East Hartford; and John Deme–owned Manchester Broadcasting Company proposed a station in Manchester. The FCC issued a decision favoring Deme in July 1957, and the new station, WINF, began broadcasting on May 18, 1958.
