= Franklin M. Doolittle =

American radio pioneer (1893–1979)

- Doolittle in 1939
- Born: Franklin Malcolm Doolittle; June 16, 1893; New Haven, Connecticut, U.S.
- Died: March 4, 1979 (aged 85); New Haven, Connecticut, U.S.
- Occupation: Radio engineer
- Known for: Professional radio
- Spouse: Frances Cooper Doolittle
- Children: 3

Franklin Malcolm Doolittle (June 16, 1893 – March 4, 1979) was an American radio industry pioneer, who founded WDRC, the oldest AM station in Connecticut, in addition to that state's first FM station, WHCN, which was also one of the first FM broadcasters in the United States. In 1924–1925, he conducted the first tests made of stereo radio broadcasts.

== Biography ==
Doolittle was born on June 16, 1893, in New Haven, Connecticut. He had an early interest in radio (then known as "wireless telegraphy") and built his first station in 1906 at the age of 13, using a Ford automobile spark coil as a transmitter, and a coherer receiver. He later built an arc transmitter capable of audio transmissions.

At age 18, Doolittle enrolled in the Sheffield Scientific School at Yale University, while continuing to work during vacation periods aboard merchant ships as a commercial radio operator for the United Wireless Telegraph Company and American Marconi. He also taught evening radio courses at the New Haven Boys' Club. In 1915, he was awarded the degree of Bachelor of Philosophy in Electrical Engineering, and after graduating worked for two years on radio projects at Bell Telephone Laboratories in New York City. During World War One he became an ensign in the Naval Reserve, and after completing a training course at Annapolis transferred to the regular line, becoming a radio officer under Admiral Hoogewerff in the 4th Squadron, Atlantic Fleet. With the end of the war, Doolittle returned to New Haven. In 1919 he began to teach communications engineering at Yale on a part-time basis, which lasted for six years.

Doolittle operated an amateur radio station, 1AGI, located at his home at 167 Willard Street in New Haven. In 1921, he began broadcasting weekly concerts, and on November 12, 1921, made one of the first broadcasts of a football game, between Yale and Princeton universities, when he repeated sideline commentary by New Haven Register reporter Dan Mulvey, that was received by telephone. The Department of Commerce, which regulated U.S. radio at this time, eventually banned entertainment broadcasts by amateur radio stations and issued a regulation requiring that broadcasting stations would now have to hold a Limited Commercial license. On December 2, 1922, a broadcasting station license, with the call sign WPAJ, was issued to the Doolittle Radio Company in New Haven, which made its debut broadcast on December 10, 1922. Although not the first commercially licensed broadcasting station in the state of Connecticut, this station, now WDRC in Hartford, is the state's oldest surviving one.

In 1924, Doolittle was issued U.S. patent 1,513,973 for the use of dual radio transmissions to create stereo (then commonly called "binaural") reception. That same year WPAJ was temporarily authorized to concurrently operate a second transmitter, and Doolittle conducted the first reported stereo radio broadcasts, lasting about a year. Left and right audio was distributed to WPAJ's two transmitters by dual microphones, placed about 7 inches (18 cm) apart to match the distance between a person's ears. Doolittle ended the experiments primarily because a lack of available frequencies on the congested AM broadcast band meant that it was not practical for stations to occupy two frequencies, plus it was cumbersome and expensive for listeners to operate two radio receivers.

In 1926, Doolittle closed the radio store he had started in 1920, to concentrate on broadcasting. On November 30, 1933, he married the former Frances Cooper, and they went on to have three children.

The original broadcasting stations employed "amplitude modulation" (AM) transmitters. During the 1930s, Edwin Howard Armstrong developed a competing transmission technology, "wide-band frequency modulation" (FM). Doolittle was impressed with FM's potential, in particular due to its high-fidelity and near immunity to static interference, and in early 1939 announced plans to convert an existing experimental high frequency "Apex" station on Meriden Mountain, W1XPW, from AM transmissions into an FM broadcasting station. This station, (later WDRC-FM, now WHCN), inaugurated regular programming on October 2. W1XPW was the third FM station to broadcast on a regular schedule, following Edwin Armstrong's W2XMN in Alpine, New Jersey, and the Yankee Network's W1XOJ in Massachusetts. However, W2XMN was unaffiliated with any AM stations, and W1XOJ was owned by the Yankee radio network, so station publicity referred to W1XPW as the "first frequency-modulated outlet to be built by an independently-owned commercial broadcasting station" (WDRC). In 1952, Doolittle returned to dual-transmitter stereo experimentation, when New York City's WQXR paired with its FM sister station, WQXR-FM, to transmit a stereo program that was relayed for rebroadcast by WDRC and WDRC-FM.

In 1959, Doolittle sold his radio station holdings and retired. He died on March 4, 1979, at Yale-New Haven Hospital, aged 85.
