= Bob Steele (broadcaster) =

American radio personality (1911 – 2002)

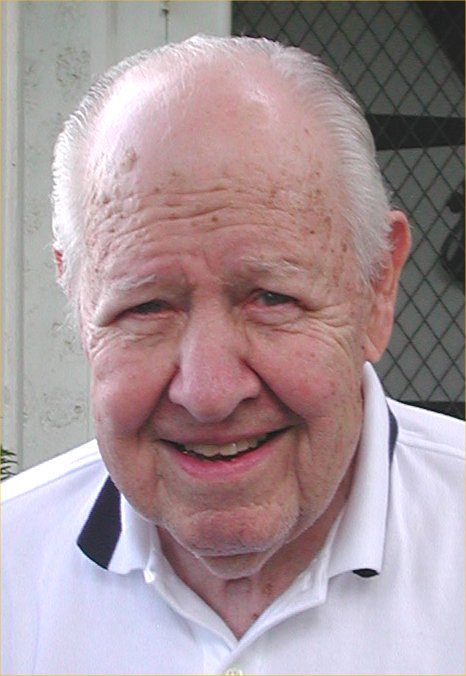
- Bob Steele (Robert Lee Steele) in a casual outdoor setting.
- Born: Robert Lee Steele; July 13, 1911; Kansas City, Missouri, U.S.
- Died: December 6, 2002 (aged 91); Hartford, Connecticut, U.S.
- Children: Robert H. Steele et al.
- Presenting career
- Show: The Bob Steele Show
- Station: WTIC (AM)
- Time slot: 5:30-10 AM ET
- Country: United States

Robert Lee Steele (July 13, 1911 – December 6, 2002) was an American radio personality. He was a radio host with WTIC Radio in Hartford, Connecticut for more than 66 years, and hosted the morning radio show in Southern New England for most of the time. He was born in Kansas City, Missouri.

== Career ==
Steele was formerly employed as a newsboy, salesman, motorcycle messenger, and professional boxer. He was invited to Hartford, Connecticut to announce a motorcycle race. On his last day in town, he walked into WTIC's radio studios on a whim and asked to audition for a vacant announcer position. He eventually became a junior staff announcer at WTIC in October 1936.

Steele took over The G. Fox Morning Watch radio show on WTIC Radio AM 1080 in 1943, which was then sponsored by G. Fox & Co., the primary department store chain in the greater Hartford area. In 1950, the program was renamed The Bob Steele Show. By the time he retired from his daily show in 1991, his show was the longest running radio program in the country. Steele continued to host a Saturday morning radio show on WTIC until his death at age 91. For much of his time at WTIC, he also hosted the evening sports program on both WTIC radio and television (originally WTIC-TV and later WFSB 3).

== Show content ==
Steele's shows consisted of weather (including world temperatures), sports (Steele was longtime sports director for WTIC), birthdays (only over 80), anniversaries (only over 60), local and national news, and storytelling for children. Steele also regularly shared tips and lessons on grammar and pronunciation, including his Word for the Day. He enjoyed hearing from his listeners via letter, including listeners from Australia. Due to the 50,000-watt power of the WTIC transmitter and its clear channel status, atmospheric conditions would occasionally allow his show to be heard in the early days of radio from as far away as Australia.

Throughout the 1960s, Steele vowed not to play music by the Beatles and other rock and roll acts on his show. By the 1980s, however, oldies from the sixties, including songs by the Beatles and others, worked their way into his playlists. Steele more often played novelty songs including Rolf Harris' "Two Buffaloes," Mitch Miller's "The Yellow Rose of Texas," and, annually on May 20, a song entitled, "I'm Getting Married on The 20th of May." He also was very fond of "Tulips in Amsterdam" and "Any Dream Will Do".

== Personal life ==
Robert Steele has four sons, Robert, Paul, Philip, and Steven. His oldest son, Robert H. Steele, represented Connecticut's 2nd congressional district in the early 1970s and was the unsuccessful Republican candidate for governor in 1974.

In 1980, Steele published a book entitled "Bob Steele: A Man and His Humor." A second book celebrating his 50th anniversary on radio was published in 1986 and his last, "The Word for the Day," written with son Phil Steele, was published in 2002.

The Bob Steele Reading Center at the Literacy Volunteers of Greater Hartford facility on Arbor Street, dedicated in 1989, honors his years as an advocate of literacy.

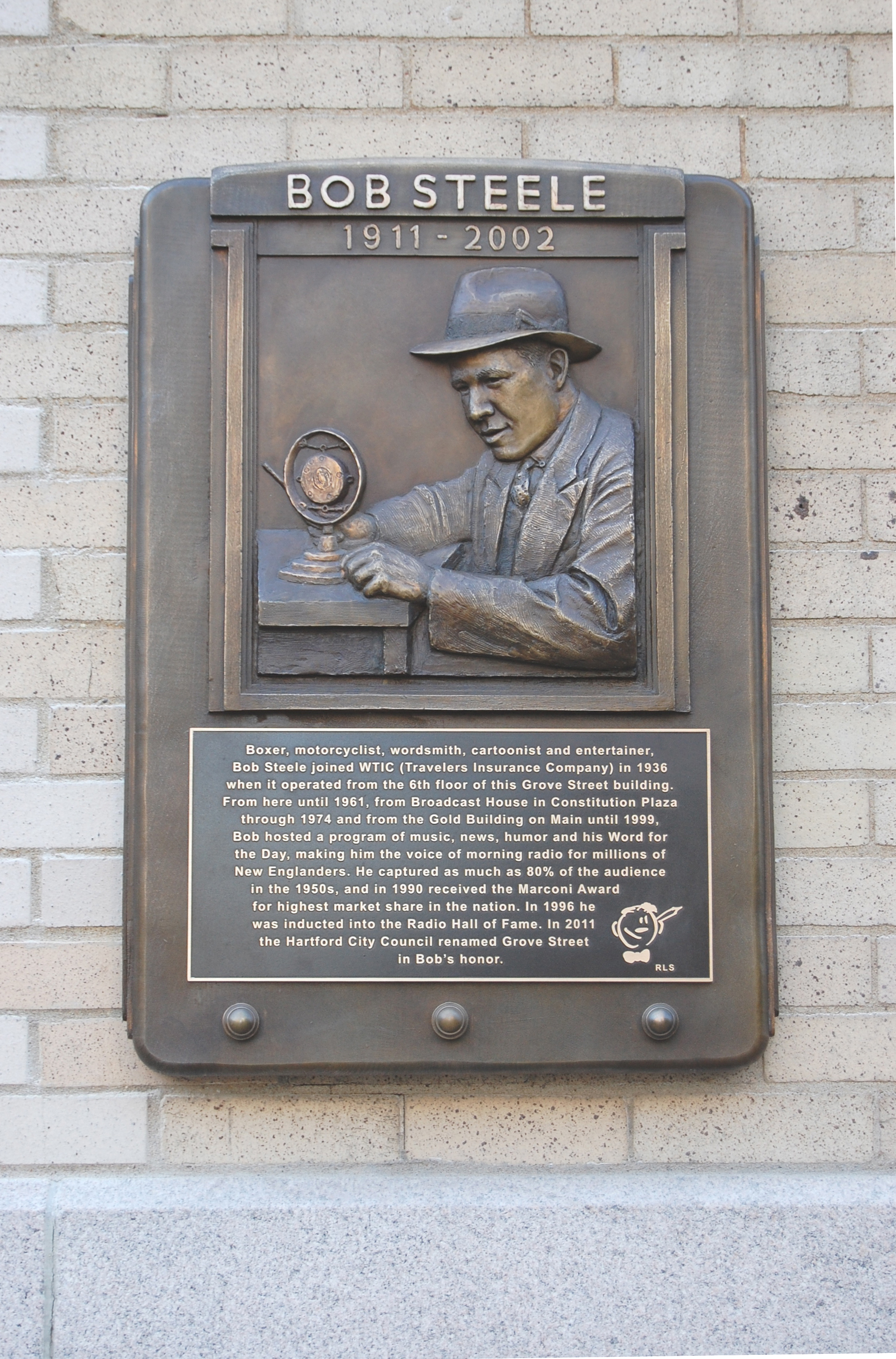
Plaque commemorating radio broadcaster Bob Steele, located at the corner of Prospect and Bob Steele streets in downtown Hartford.

On December 12, 2011, the Hartford City Council voted unanimously to rename in Steele's honor a section of the city's Grove Street (between Prospect Street and Columbus Boulevard) in recognition of his iconic status and the 100th birthday. Bob Steele Street was officially dedicated in a special ceremony on January 4, 2013. A bronze plaque honoring Steele's career was installed on the east side of the Travelers Insurance building at the intersection of Bob Steele and Prospect streets on May 19, 2015. The plaque, created by sculptor Michael Keropian, was unveiled in a ceremony on May 29, 2015.
