= WUCS =

- Windsor Locks, Connecticut; United States
- Broadcast area: Greater Hartford
- Frequency: 97.9 MHz (HD Radio)
- Branding: Fox Sports 97-9

Programming
- Format: Sports radio
- Subchannels: HD2: Bilingual AC "Magic"; HD3: WPOP simulcast (Conservative talk with sports)
- Affiliations: Fox Sports Radio; New York Yankees Radio Network

Ownership
- Owner: iHeartMedia, Inc.; (iHM Licenses, LLC)
- Sister stations: WHCN; WKSS; WPOP; WWYZ

History
- First air date: July 1990
- Former call signs: WPKX (1990–2012)
- Call sign meaning: Connecticut Sports

Technical information
- Licensing authority: FCC
- Facility ID: 46965
- Class: A
- ERP: 3,400 watts
- HAAT: 135 meters (443 ft)
- Transmitter coordinates: 41°46′0″N 72°40′38″W

Links
- Public license information: Public file; LMS
- Webcast: Listen live (via iHeartRadio); HD2: Listen live (via iHeartRadio)
- Website: foxsports979.iheart.com

WUCS (97.9 FM) is a commercial sports radio station licensed to Windsor Locks, Connecticut, and owned by iHeartMedia, Inc. It serves as the Hartford media market's Fox Sports Radio affiliate. The station broadcasts from studios and offices located on Columbus Boulevard in Hartford.

== History ==
The station first signed on in July 1990 as WPKX, a country music station licensed to Enfield, Connecticut. The station originally targeted Springfield, Massachusetts, even though Enfield is part of the Hartford market. However, Enfield is on the Connecticut-Massachusetts state line. It was owned by SFX Broadcasting in the late 1990s, then Capstar. AMFM owned it briefly before being acquired by Clear Channel Communications (now iHeartMedia) in 2000.

The station had an HD Radio HD2 station broadcasting Americana music since early 2006.

In March 2010, Clear Channel Communications filed an application with the FCC to move the WPKX transmitter from Provin Mountain in Feeding Hills, Massachusetts to the top of City Place in Downtown Hartford, in a bid to move the station from the Springfield Arbitron market to the larger and more lucrative Hartford Arbitron market. In January 2011, the move was refiled with a city of license change to Windsor Locks; this followed an agreement with WMAS-FM, which agreed to change its city of license from Springfield to Enfield as part of a deal involving a Clear Channel-owned generator in Albuquerque, New Mexico. The previous country format moved to WRNX (100.9 FM).

On January 27, 2012, at 6 am, the station switched to a simulcast of ESPN Radio affiliate WPOP (1410 AM). The call sign was changed to WUCS on February 7, 2012. WPOP switched to Fox Sports Radio in March 2012, with ESPN Radio remaining on WUCS.

As of the 2018–19 academic year, WUCS serves as the flagship station for Connecticut Huskies radio play-by-play, including the school's football, hockey, and men's and women's basketball programs. Coverage is produced for the school by IMG Media.

The station switched affiliations from ESPN Radio to Fox Sports Radio and rebranded as "Fox Sports 97.9" on January 2, 2024.
