= WHCN =

- Hartford, Connecticut; United States
- Broadcast area: Greater Hartford
- Frequency: 105.9 MHz (HD Radio)
- Branding: The River 105.9

Programming
- Format: Classic hits

Ownership
- Owner: iHeartMedia, Inc.; (iHM Licenses, LLC)
- Sister stations: WKSS; WPOP; WUCS; WWYZ

History
- First air date: 1939
- Former call signs: W1XPW (1939–1941); W65H (1941–1943); WDRC-FM (1943–1955); WFMQ (1955–1957)
- Call sign meaning: Hartford Concert Network

Technical information
- Licensing authority: FCC
- Facility ID: 72144
- Class: B
- ERP: 16,000 watts directional
- HAAT: 264 meters (866 ft)
- Transmitter coordinates: 41.563°N 72.845°W

Links
- Public license information: Public file; LMS
- Webcast: Listen live (via iHeartRadio)
- Website: theriver1059.iheart.com

WHCN (105.9 FM) is a commercial radio station licensed to Hartford, Connecticut. It broadcasts a classic hits radio format for the Hartford, Waterbury and New Haven areas, and is owned by iHeartMedia, Inc. It is branded "The River 105.9", a reference to the Connecticut River. Its studios and offices are located on Columbus Boulevard in Hartford.

The station's transmitter site is located at West Peak State Park in nearby Meriden. WHCN is one of the oldest FM stations, beginning as an experimental outlet in 1939. In addition to a standard analog transmission, WHCN broadcasts using HD Radio technology.

== Signal ==
WHCN is a Class B FM station. It would normally transmit at 50,000 watts ERP (Effective Radiated Power) at a HAAT (Height Above Average Terrain) of 150 meters. Because WHCN's tower is 264 meters, it is limited to an ERP of 16,000 watts, to maintain an equivalent coverage area.

Its signal is radiated using a directional pattern, with the maximum sent toward Hartford at 30° azimuth. It is reduced in other directions, and weakest toward the southwest, at 190° and 230° azimuth. This is done to avoid interference with WQXR-FM, also on 105.9 MHz, whose transmitter is in New York City. In those directions, the signal is .45 of full power, or 7,200 watts; WQXR operates with reduced power (610 watts at 416 meters) to avoid interfering with WHCN.

== History ==
=== Experimental authorization ===
In the 1930s, experiments were begun into establishing radio stations broadcasting on "Very High Frequency" (VHF) assignments above 30 MHz. Reception of stations operating on these frequencies tended to be limited to line-of-sight distances, so placing the transmitting antenna at as high an altitude as possible provided maximum coverage. Stations operating on these higher frequencies were known informally as "Apex" stations, and initially employed "amplitude modulation" (AM) transmissions like those used in the standard AM broadcast band. Franklin M. Doolittle, the owner of AM station WDRC in Hartford, obtained permission to establish an experimental Apex station, W1XSL, with a transmitter site located on Meriden Mountain.

Another innovation during the 1930s was the introduction of a competing transmission technology, "wide-band frequency modulation" (FM), which was developed in the United States by Edwin Howard Armstrong. This was promoted as being superior to AM transmissions, in particular due to its high fidelity and near immunity to static interference. On June 17, 1936, Armstrong formally demonstrated his FM system to the FCC. Doolittle was impressed with FM's potential, and in early 1939 announced plans to convert the Meriden experimental high-frequency station, now operating under the call sign W1XPW, into an FM broadcasting station.

W1XPW's conversion to FM was reported to have been completed as of May 13, 1939, with the station now operating with 1,000 watts on 43.4 MHz. Following an irregular series of test transmissions, the station inaugurated regular programming on October 2, with an initial schedule of 2 to 10 p.m. daily. W1XPW was the third FM station to broadcast on a regular schedule, after Edwin Armstrong's W2XMN in Alpine, New Jersey, and the Yankee Network's W1XOJ in Massachusetts. However, W2XMN was unaffiliated with any AM stations, and W1XOJ was owned by the Yankee radio network, so station publicity referred to W1XPW as the "first frequency-modulated outlet to be built by an independently-owned commercial broadcasting station" (WDRC). On January 4, 1940, W1XPW participated in the first demonstration of an FM over-the-air inter-city relay, which originated in Yonkers, New York, was received and relayed in turn to W1XPW by Armstrong's W2XMN in Alpine, then further relayed to W1XOJ in Massachusetts.

=== Commercial operation ===
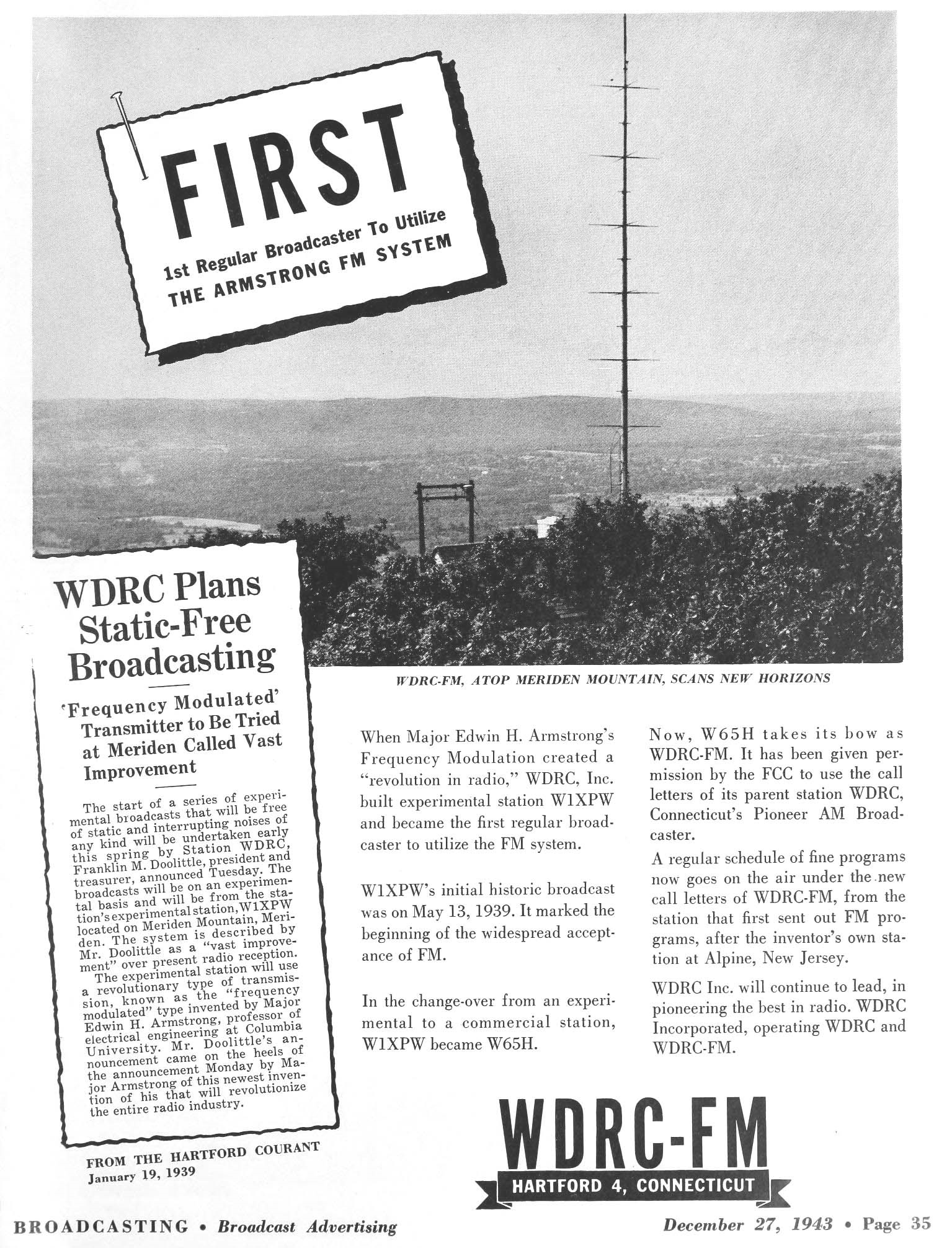
1943 station advertisement showcasing its transmitter tower on the west peak of Meriden Mountain.

In May 1940, the FCC authorized an FM band effective January 1, 1941, operating on 40 channels spanning 42–50 MHz. WDRC, Inc. was issued a construction permit for a station on 46.5 MHz that was assigned the call sign W65H. Effective November 1, 1943, the FCC modified its policy for FM callsigns, and the call sign was changed to WDRC-FM. In 1946, as part of a general relocation to a new FM band allocation, the station was reassigned to 94.3 MHz, and the following year moved to 93.7 MHz.

In 1924–1925, Franklin Doolittle made the first stereo radio broadcasts, when the broadcasting station he had founded in 1922, WPAJ (WDRC after 1925), was temporarily authorized to broadcast left and right audio channels over two different frequencies on the AM band. In 1952 he returned to dual-transmitter stereo experimentation, when New York City's WQXR paired with its FM sister station, WQXR-FM, to transmit a stereo program that was relayed for rebroadcast by WDRC and WDRC-FM.

WDRC-FM's call letters were changed to WFMQ on January 1, 1955. In 1957, the station was purchased by The Concert Network, Inc., a network of FM stations that primarily provided classical music programming, whose affiliates included WBCN in Boston, WNCN in New York City, and WXCN in Providence, Rhode Island. WFMQ's call sign was changed to WHCN, and the next year the station moved to its current assignment of 105.9 MHz.

=== Rock music era ===
WHCN shifted from classical music to progressive rock in 1969, becoming one of the earliest commercial progressive rock stations in Connecticut. The station later evolved toward album-oriented rock. In the 1990s, WHCN was home to the morning show Picozzi and the Horn, hosted by Mike Picozzi and Gary Lee Horn, who had been together on the station for more than a decade. In 1996, WHCN was listed as an album-oriented rock (AOR) station at 105.9 MHz, with Brian Krycz serving as program director.

=== Move to adult hits ===
After years of declining ratings, the 33-year run of the WHCN brand came to an abrupt end in March 2002, when WHCN became known as "The River 105.9", retaining most of its on-air staff from its previous Classic Rock incarnation. The station's "The Rock" slogan and later the station's former Asylum Street studios would be adopted by one-time rival WCCC. WHCN's playlist was more diverse than other stations in the market, which helped it shoot up in ratings from 13th place to 5th place within a year.

At one time the station's HD2 signal was a rock format known as "Deep Tracks", that played less familiar titles. It was later changed to Club Jam EDM.
