= WWYZ =

- Waterbury, Connecticut; United States
- Broadcast area: Waterbury; Hartford; New Haven; Bridgeport, Connecticut
- Frequency: 92.5 MHz (HD Radio)
- Branding: Country 92-5

Programming
- Format: Country music
- Affiliations: Premiere Networks

Ownership
- Owner: iHeartMedia; (iHM Licenses, LLC)
- Sister stations: WHCN; WKSS; WPOP; WUCS

History
- First air date: August 1, 1961
- Former call signs: WATR-FM (1961–1973); WENU-FM (1973)

Technical information
- Licensing authority: FCC
- Facility ID: 74205
- Class: B
- ERP: 17,000 watts
- HAAT: 268 meters (879 ft)
- Transmitter coordinates: 41°33′47.3″N 72°50′40.3″W

Links
- Public license information: Public file; LMS
- Webcast: Listen live (via iHeartRadio)
- Website: country925.iheart.com

WWYZ (92.5 FM) is a commercial radio station licensed to serve Waterbury, Connecticut. It is owned by iHeartMedia, and airs a country music radio format.

The WWYZ studios and offices are located on Columbus Boulevard in Hartford, and its transmitter is located in Meriden, on West Peak in the Hanging Hills.

== History ==
=== WATR-FM ===
The station signed on the air on August 1, 1961, as WATR-FM. It was owned by the Gilmore family, who also owned WATR (1320 AM) and WATR-TV (channel 53; now WCCT-TV channel 20). The call sign stood for the city of license, Waterbury.

At first, WATR-FM simulcast the AM 1320 programming. In the early 1970s, it switched to an easy listening format. In 1973, it briefly changed to WENU-FM, before changing again to WWYZ. With the new call sign, the station referred to itself as "The Music Lover's WISE Choice". In 1976, the station moved from easy listening to adult contemporary, imaging as "YZ, The Natural 92". By the early 1980s the station was known as "Lite 92".

=== Switch to country ===
In the 1980s, WWYZ broadcast a mix of formats from country to Top-40. In between late August and early September 1988, it became an all country formatted station. The station reputedly adopted an all-Christmas music format during the 1998 holiday season, three years before the format was introduced nationwide. In July 1999, WWYZ was acquired by AMFM, Inc. The following year, AMFM was acquired by Clear Channel Communications, which changed its name to iHeartMedia in 2014.
