= WPOP =

News/talk radio station in Hartford, Connecticut

- Hartford, Connecticut; United States
- Broadcast area: Greater Hartford
- Frequency: 1410 kHz
- Branding: News Radio 1410 AM & 100.9 FM WPOP

Programming
- Format: Conservative talk with sports
- Affiliations: Fox News Radio; Fox Sports Radio; Premiere Networks; Westwood One

Ownership
- Owner: iHeartMedia, Inc.; (iHM Licenses, LLC)
- Sister stations: WHCN; WKSS; WUCS; WWYZ

History
- First air date: July 15, 1935
- Former call signs: WMFE (1935); WNBC (1935–1944); WHTD (1944–1946); WONS (1946–1953); WGTH (1953–1956)
- Former frequencies: 1380 kHz (1935–1941)
- Call sign meaning: Popular music (earlier format)

Technical information
- Licensing authority: FCC
- Facility ID: 37232
- Class: B
- Power: 5,000 watts
- Transmitter coordinates: 41°41′34.36″N 72°45′5.35″W
- Translator: 100.9 W265EB (Hartford)
- Repeater: 97.9 WUCS-HD3 (Windsor Locks)

Links
- Public license information: Public file; LMS
- Webcast: Listen live (via iHeartRadio)
- Website: newsradio1410.iheart.com

WPOP (1410 AM) is a commercial radio station licensed to in Hartford, Connecticut, broadcasting a conservative talk format with sports programming, owned by iHeartMedia, Inc. The station's studios and offices are located on Columbus Boulevard in Hartford.

WPOP's transmitter is situated off Cedar Street in Newington. WPOP is also heard on the HD3 channel of co-owned WUCS (97.9 FM). Low-power FM translator W265EB at 100.9 MHz additionally relays WPOP programming,

== History ==
=== WNBC ===
The station first signed on the air on July 15, 1935. It broadcast at 1380 kHz as WNBC in New Britain, Connecticut, about 10 miles southwest of Hartford. The station, owned by William J. Sanders, began as a daytimer powered at only 250 watts. It was originally issued the call sign WMFE, but changed to WNBC on June 12, 1935. The WNBC license was transferred to State Broadcasting Corporation in June 1936. The station, along with WELI in New Haven and WCOP in Boston, was part of a group of new stations financed by Arde Bulova.

On August 1, 1938, WNBC announced that it would begin full-time operation by October 1; its daytime power would increase to 1,000 watts, with 250 watts being used at night. On December 4, the station became an affiliate of the NBC Blue Network. The following year, WNBC was authorized to use 1,000 watts at night using a directional antenna; the upgrade was coordinated with a similar nighttime power increase at KQV in Pittsburgh, which also operated at 1380 kHz.

=== Move to Hartford ===
In 1941, with the enactment of North American Regional Broadcasting Agreement (NARBA), the station switched to its present frequency of AM 1410. Power was boosted to the current 5,000 watts, and it moved its city of license to Hartford.

Control of WNBC passed to Arde Bulova in 1943, after Sanders sold his interest in the station. The following year, Bulova and Harold A. Lafount sold WNBC to the Yankee Network for $220,000. The new owners renamed the station WHTD, and it affiliated with the Mutual Broadcasting System. Mutual and most Yankee Network programming had been airing on WTHT, though WNBC already aired Yankee's newscasts. The call sign was again changed on April 21, 1946, to WONS. The "NS" stood for "Nutmeg State".

=== Merging two stations ===
In October 1953, Yankee Network parent General Teleradio and The Hartford Times announced that WONS and WTHT would merge, using the WONS facilities and license, in connection with the stations dropping their competing bids for television channel 18 in favor of a single application. When the station relaunched as WGTH on February 14, 1954, it took on the ABC Radio Network affiliation that had been on WTHT; it also continued WONS's Mutual and Yankee Network affiliations.

The Gannett Newspapers–owned Times announced the sale of its 45-percent stake in the WGTH stations back to General Teleradio in 1955, in connection with the planned sale of WGTH-TV to CBS. The following year, what had become RKO Teleradio Pictures sold WGTH radio to H. Scott Kilgore's Tele-Broadcasting Inc., for $250,000, adding it to a group that included WKXL in Concord, New Hampshire; WARE in Ware, Massachusetts; WKXV in Knoxville, Tennessee; and KUDL in Kansas City, Missouri. As network programming moved from radio to television, WGTH switched to a middle of the road format. It changed its call sign to WPOP on August 1, 1956, signifying that it played popular music.

Tele-Broadcasters sold WPOP to Joseph C. Amaturo and Walter B. Dunn's Wire Broadcasting—owners of WIRE in Indianapolis and partially co-owned with WFTL and WFTL-FM in Fort Lauderdale, Florida; WESO in Southbridge, Massachusetts; and WBFM in New York City—for $465,000 in 1963. WPOP was a highly rated Top 40 radio station during the 1960s and early 1970s. It was known for its aggressive promotion of new and upcoming music; it is credited with helping to break The Four Seasons to fame. The station achieved its highest level of success during this era, as it vied with rival WDRC for youthful listeners in the Hartford radio market.

=== Merv Griffin ownership ===
In August 1972, January Enterprises, the company owned by entertainer and TV talk show host Merv Griffin, announced its $2.75 million purchase of WPOP. The sale, which was part of a realignment of Amaturo's broadcast holdings, was approved in 1973, and added WPOP to a group whose Connecticut holdings already included WWCO and WIOF in Waterbury; it coincided with Griffin's sale of WWCO. After Merv Griffin's radio group was split as part of his 1976 divorce from Julann Griffin, he retained ownership of WPOP, WIOF, and WBAX in Wilkes-Barre, Pennsylvania.

On July 1, 1975, WPOP dropped its hit music format, switching to all-news, carrying NBC's News and Information Service (NIS), with a sizable local news staff covering Connecticut news stories. When the NIS network ended two years later, WPOP continued the all-news format using its own anchors supplemented by CBS Radio News and the Associated Press radio service.

=== Talk radio ===
By the late 1980s, talk shows were added WPOP's news format, and the station cut back on its news segments. Affiliation switched from CBS Radio to the ABC Information Network.

The Griffin Group's radio stations, including WPOP and WYSR (the former WIOF), were merged with Liberty Broadcasting in 1994; the merger placed the stations under common ownership with WHCN, which Liberty concurrently acquired from Beck-Ross Communications. SFX Broadcasting announced its $223.25 million purchase of Liberty on November 15, 1995; it immediately resold the Hartford stations, along with WMXB in Richmond, Virginia; WSNE, WHJY, and WHJJ in Providence, Rhode Island; and WGNA, WGNA-FM, WPYX, and WTRY in Albany, New York, to Multi-Market Radio. Both SFX and Multi-Market were associated with Robert F. X. Sillerman's Sillerman Companies; the two companies merged in 1996.

=== Sports radio ===
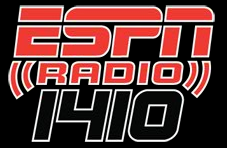
WPOP's last logo as "ESPN Radio 1410"

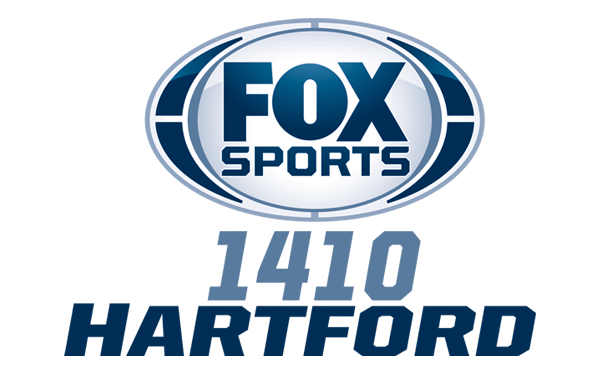
Logo as "Fox Sports Radio 1410"

On January 13, 1997, SFX Broadcasting switched WPOP's format to all-sports; most of its programming was provided by One-on-One Sports, but it also carried The Fabulous Sports Babe and weekend programming from ESPN Radio, based in nearby Bristol, Connecticut. The station ended its One-on-One Sports affiliation on February 28, 1999, becoming a full-time ESPN Radio affiliate.

Hicks, Muse, Tate & Furst's Capstar Broadcasting announced its acquisition of SFX Broadcasting on August 25, 1997; the merger was approved by the Department of Justice on March 31, 1998. Capstar and Chancellor Media announced in August 1998 that they would merge (Hicks, Muse, Tate & Furst was also a major shareholder in Chancellor); upon the merger's completion in July 1999, the combined company was named AMFM Inc. AMFM was in turn acquired by Clear Channel Communications (forerunner to iHeartMedia) in a deal announced on October 4, 1999, and completed in August 2000.

On January 27, 2012, a second Clear Channel station in the Hartford market began carrying ESPN Radio: WPKX (97.9 FM), previously a country music outlet for Springfield, Massachusetts. The FM station eventually changed its call letters to WUCS, with the "CS" standing for "Connecticut Sports". WPOP switched from ESPN Radio to Fox Sports Radio on March 5, 2012, with ESPN Radio remaining on WUCS.

=== Mixing talk and sports ===
On August 17, 2015, WPOP changed its format from all sports to a mix of talk and sports, branded as "News Radio 1410". Connecticut news updates would be provided by co-owned WELI in New Haven. The WELI morning show, known as The Vinnie Penn Project, would be shared with WPOP.

In January 2019, WPOP added an FM translator, W265EB at 100.9 MHz. The translator allows listeners in Hartford and its adjacent suburbs to hear the station on FM as well as AM radio.

== Programming ==
Vinnie Penn hosts the morning show, with originates from WELI in New Haven; the remainder of the schedule is nationally syndicated conservative talk shows. It is also the local affiliate for the New York Yankees and New York Jets. In the summer, WPOP carries Hartford Yard Goats baseball games, and in winter, carries Bridgeport Sound Tigers and Hartford Wolf Pack hockey games.

== Translators ==
Call sign	Frequency	City of license	FID	ERP (W)	HAAT	Class	Transmitter coordinates	FCC info
W265EB	100.9 FM	Hartford, Connecticut	140333	220	167 m (548 ft)	D	41°46′0.3″N 72°40′36.3″W	LMS
