= The Hartford Times =

Afternoon newspaper in Hartford, Connecticut

Hartford Times
- "News is an immortal bubble and the press endures within."
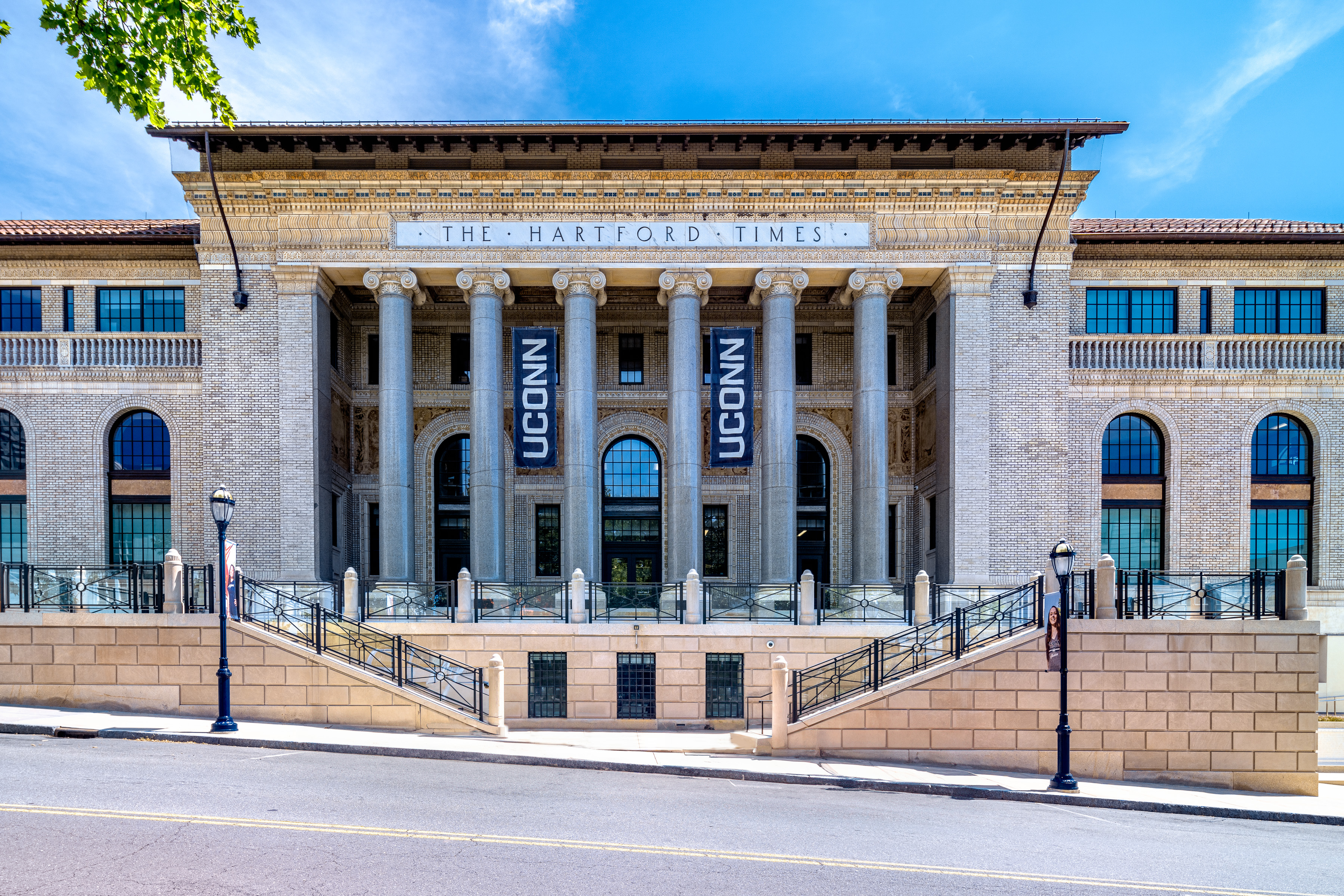
- The Hartford Times Building
- Type: Daily newspaper
- Founded: 1817
- Ceased publication: October 20, 1976
- Language: English
- Headquarters: 10 Prospect Street Hartford, CT 06103
- City: Hartford, Connecticut
- Country: United States
- Circulation: less than 70,000 at closure

The Hartford Times was a daily afternoon newspaper serving the Hartford, Connecticut, community from 1817 to 1976. It was owned for decades by the Gannett Company which sold the financially struggling paper in 1973 to the owners of the New Haven Register, who failed to turn things around leading to its closure in 1976.

== History ==
The Times was a leading newspaper in Connecticut with the largest circulation in the state in 1917. It was started by Frederick D. Bolles and John M. Niles, a future senator, as an anti-federalist weekly by the name of The Hartford Weekly Times in 1817. It styled itself as a champion of reform and an advocate for the people throughout its history. One early editor was Gideon Welles, later secretary of the Navy during the Civil War. Alfred E. Burr led the paper for over six decades from 1829 until 1890, making it a daily and giving him considerable political influence statewide.

In 1920 at the height of its success the paper commissioned architect Donn Barber to build a new headquarters, The Hartford Times Building. He salvaged six massive granite pillars and other architectural details from the Madison Square Presbyterian Church, a famous work of Stanford White. A series of murals behind the columns allegorize the motto, "News is an immortal bubble and the press endures within."

The newspaper was purchased by the Gannett interests in early 1928.

During the 1940s, the paper owned a radio station named WTHT.

As late as the 1960s the paper had circulation over 140,000 but its last years were marked by rapid decline. Andrea Nissen, an assistant city editor at the time of the demise said:

[We were] brevetted by incompetency. Constant changes in management vitiated the confidence of the community and of ourselves... I remember three or four different editors and publishers. There was little hegemony to spare and our leaders went as fast—and with equally devastating results—as Sherman through Atlanta."

== Notable journalists ==
Several accomplished individuals contributed to the newspaper, including Brit Hume, as a reporter; the television writer Robert Palm; the American painter, James Britton, employed as a staff artist; film critic Lou Lumenick, employed as a reporter and city editor of the Times' short-lived morning edition, The Morning Line; U.S. diplomat and speechwriter Robert Fagan, who worked as a reporter; and editorial cartoonist, Edmund S. Valtman, who won a 1962 Pulitzer Prize for his 1961 cartoon, "What You Need, Man, Is a Revolution Like Mine".

== Other media holdings ==
The newspaper additionally owned Hartford radio station WTHT (1230 AM) from 1936 to 1954, and WTHT-FM (106.1) from 1948 to 1950. WTHT was merged into General Tele-Radio's WONS in 1954 to resolving competing applications for channel 18 in Hartford, which signed on as WGTH under a General/Times joint venture that lasted from 1954 to 1955.
