= WTIC (AM) =

- Hartford, Connecticut; United States
- Broadcast area: Greater Hartford
- Frequency: 1080 kHz
- Branding: WTIC NewsTalk 1080

Programming
- Format: News/talk
- Affiliations: ABC News Radio; Premiere Networks; Radio America; Westwood One Sports; WFSB (weather); Boston Red Sox Radio Network; New England Patriots Radio Network

Ownership
- Owner: Audacy, Inc.; (Audacy License, LLC)
- Sister stations: WRCH; WTIC-FM; WZMX

History
- Founded: December 17, 1924
- First air date: February 10, 1925
- Call sign meaning: Travelers Insurance Company (original owner)

Technical information
- Licensing authority: FCC
- Facility ID: 66464
- Class: A
- Power: 50,000 watts
- Transmitter coordinates: 41°46′39.36″N 72°48′17.35″W
- Repeater: 96.5 WTIC-FM HD2 (Hartford)

Links
- Public license information: Public file; LMS
- Webcast: Listen live (via Audacy)
- Website: www.audacy.com/wtic

WTIC (1080 kHz; "WTIC NewsTalk 1080") is a commercial radio station in Hartford, Connecticut, owned by Audacy, Inc. It airs a news/talk radio format. The station's studios and offices are located on Addison Road in Windsor.

WTIC is a class A clear-channel station with a transmitter power output of 50,000 watts, the maximum permitted for U.S. AM stations. Its transmitter site is a two-tower facility off Deercliff Road in Avon. WTIC has a single tower, non-directional signal in the daytime, at night, when AM band signals travel much farther, WTIC uses both towers to create a directional pattern, primarily to protect KRLD in Dallas, Texas, the other Class A station on 1080 AM.

WTIC is the primary entry point (PEP) for the Emergency Alert System (EAS) in Connecticut.

== History ==
=== Early years ===
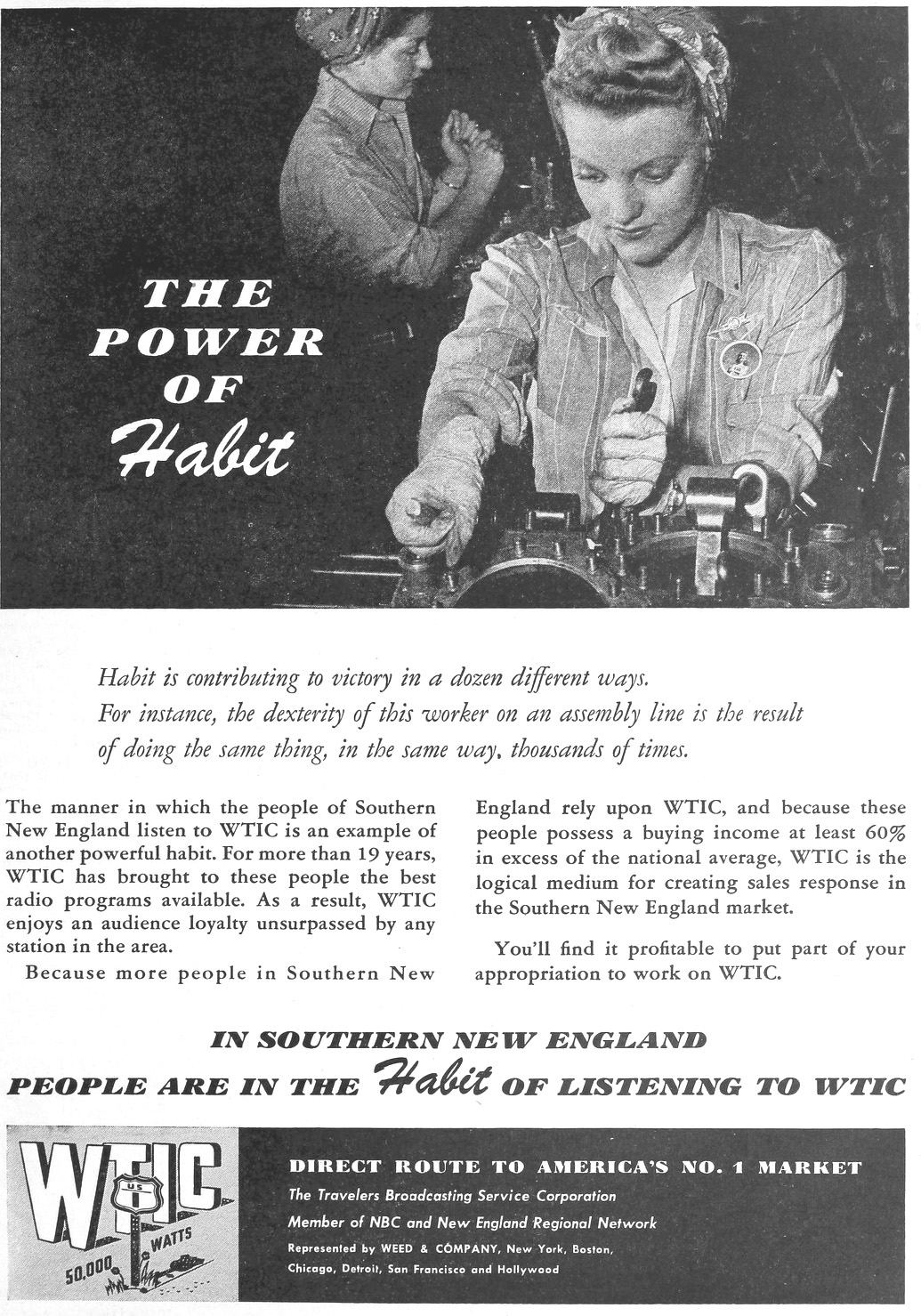
WTIC advertisement promoting U.S. factory work during World War II (1944).

WTIC is the second oldest radio station in Connecticut, after WDRC, which went on the air in 1922. WTIC was first authorized, by telegram, on December 17, 1924. The station was founded by the Travelers Insurance Company and its call sign reflected the initials of that corporation. The original studios were in the Travelers Insurance Building at 26 Grove Street in Hartford. WTIC began a series of test transmissions in late December 1924, and began regular programming with a debut broadcast on February 10, 1925.

The Federal Radio Commission (FRC) was formed in 1927. Its reauthorization a year later included the Davis Amendment, which specified a nationwide "equality of radio broadcasting service". The United States was divided into 5 zones, with 8 "clear channel" frequencies assigned to each zone. Zone 1 was in New England, and WTIC was assigned to one of its clear-channel allocations, 1060 kHz. On November 11, 1928, the FRC made a sweeping nationwide reallocation, based on its General Order 40. WTIC was temporarily assigned to 600 kHz, pending construction of a high-powered transmitter needed for broadcasting on its 1060 kHz assignment. WBAL, in Baltimore, Maryland, was also assigned to 1060 kHz, and this station was close enough to Hartford to require that it and WTIC share time.

=== NBC affiliation ===
WTIC was among the first affiliates of the NBC Red Network, carrying its schedule of dramas, comedies, news, sports, soap operas, game shows and big band broadcasts during the "Golden Age of Radio". However, its limitation as a half-time station made its operation uneconomical, and a test of synchronous operation with WEAF on 660 kHz in New York City caused too much interference. An eventual solution, adopted in 1934, moved WTIC to fulltime operation on 1040 kHz, where the nearest other occupant was KRLD in Dallas, Texas, 1500 miles (2400 km) away. In 1941, when the North American Regional Broadcasting Agreement (NARBA) went into effect, stations on 1040 kHz, including WTIC, were moved to 1080 kHz, WTIC's current frequency. WTIC and KRLD were both designated as "Class I-B" clear channel stations, required to use directional antennas at night to mutually protect each other from interference.

In 1940, WTIC began experimenting with FM radio, putting W1XSO on the air on 43.2 MHz. It later became 96.5 WTIC-FM, mostly simulcasting the AM station in its early years. In 1957, a television station was added, WTIC-TV on channel 3. As network programming moved from radio to television in the 1950s, WTIC-AM-FM switched to a full service, middle of the road format of popular music, talk, news and sports. In the 1960s, WTIC-FM started playing blocks of classical music in the afternoon and evening, eventually ending its simulcast of 1080 WTIC. By the early 1970s, WTIC became more of an adult contemporary full service format, with talk shows in the evening.

In the late 1960s, with declining night time listenership, WTIC management decided that there was a market for long-form shows that could be packaged and sold to sponsors. Two of those shows were The Golden Age of Radio and A One Night Stand with the Big Bands. They were broadcast monthly through the mid 1970s.

=== Ownership changes ===
In 1973, Travelers Insurance announced it would divest its broadcasting properties. WTIC-TV channel 3 was sold to Post-Newsweek Stations (now the Graham Media Group) in 1974, switching its call sign to WFSB. WTIC-AM-FM were sold to a group of its managers, doing business as the "Ten-Eighty Corporation". Also in the 1980s, some more talk shows were added to WTIC's line up. In the 1990s, as fewer listeners tuned to AM radio for music, WTIC added more talk programming, eventually eliminating the music shows.

In 1998, CBS Radio acquired WTIC-AM-FM. The acquisition ended WTIC's 70-year affiliation with NBC Radio. Since then, it has aired CBS Radio News updates. Its former television sister station, WFSB, had been Connecticut's CBS affiliate since 1958.

=== Schedule shake-up ===
In December 2008, the station made several programming changes. Former WTNH-TV anchor Diane Smith was dropped from the morning show she hosted with Ray Dunaway. Smith later joined the University of New Haven journalism department. "Sound Off Connecticut" hosted by conservative Jim Vicevich had an hour added to his show. The station continued to carry Rush Limbaugh at noon, but the afternoon drive personality, vocal liberal Colin McEnroe, was dismissed and his time slot replaced with a three-hour local and national news roundup.

On February 2, 2017, CBS Radio announced it would merge with Entercom. The merger was approved on November 9, 2017, and was consummated on November 17.

=== Bob Steele ===
Longtime WTIC personality Bob Steele spent 66 years on WTIC, most of them as the morning drive time host. He joined the station in 1936. At one point, nearly a third of all radios in the Hartford area were tuned to Steele's wake up show. He was also regularly seen on Channel 3, WTIC's former sister television station, hosting programs and delivering a nightly sports report.

In 1991, Bob Steele retired from hosting weekday mornings. Tom McCarthy had already begun doing the early part of the morning shift and took over the entire 5:30 a.m. to 10 a.m. time slot. Steele continued hosting Saturday mornings until his death in 2002 at age 91. In 2011 a section of Grove Street near the WTIC studios was renamed Bob Steele Street.

== Programming ==
On weekdays, WTIC features local shows during the day, with syndicated programs at night, including Erick Erickson, Sean Hannity and Coast to Coast AM with George Noory. On weekends, specialty shows are heard on money, health, real estate, travel, pets and the law, some of which are paid brokered programming. The syndicated shows CBS Eye on Travel with Peter Greenburg and Sunday Nights with Bill Cunningham air on Sunday evenings.

The station is an affiliate of the Boston Red Sox and New England Patriots Radio Networks. The station features local newsbreaks, as well as updates from ABC News Radio. WTIC's newsroom is staffed 24 hours a day with a team of local newscasters and reporters. It shares some news and weather forecasts with WFSB, the CBS TV affiliate in Hartford.

Listeners have been setting their watches to WTIC for many years. The station is known for its historic hourly time tone, the Morse code letter "V", which has been in use since 1943. This makes it one of the oldest continuous broadcast interval signals in the world. The sequence matches the opening sequence of Ludwig van Beethoven's Fifth Symphony, whose "short-short-short-long" rhythm matches that of the Morse code letter "V", and was selected during World War II to stand for "victory". WTIC employs a Global Positioning System (GPS) master clock system that activates the custom-built time-tone generator shortly before the top of the hour, timed so the final tone occurs precisely on the hour (even though everything else heard on the station is on a 10-second delay).
