= Full Power Radio =

American media company

- Company type: Subsidiary
- Industry: Radio broadcasting
- Founded: 2013; 13 years ago
- Headquarters: Bloomfield, Connecticut
- Key people: John Fuller, President
- Parent: Red Wolf Broadcasting Corporation

Full Power Radio (shortened as FPR) is an American media company, a subsidiary of Red Wolf Broadcasting Corporation, for which it currently serves as its main original radio content distribution and production arm.

It is based in Bloomfield, Connecticut and led by John Fuller. The company runs stations in a number of markets in 4 states.

== History ==
John Fuller started his first radio station WJJF at aged 21 in Hope Valley, Rhode Island. The radio first signed on as a country music station on October 5, 1985.

On February 19, 2009, Ledyard-based Red Wolf Broadcasting Corp. (doing business as Full Power Radio) who owns WBMW and WWRX in the New London area, announced that it had agreed to buy WURH for $8,000,000. On May 14, 2009, Red Wolf Broadcasting took over control of the station. The first action was to change the station's callsign to WMRQ-FM, and restore the "Radio 104.1" moniker.

In November 2013, the Judson Group filed to sell WCRI to Red Wolf Broadcasting Corporation; thus returning the station to the ownership of John Fuller. The call letters were changed to WSKP on November 29; on December 2, WSKP dropped the WCRI-FM simulcast and launched an oldies format, branded as "Kool 1180".

On October 30, 2015, the Davidson Media Group sold four New England stations to Red Wolf for an undisclosed sum. WKKB, WNTY, WACM (AM), WSPR (AM) were transferred to RW, as well as 5 radio towers and various real estate.

On January 16, 2018, Connoisseur Media sold WSNG, along with the other Talk of Connecticut stations (except for WWCO in Waterbury), WDRC-FM in Hartford, and W272DO in New Haven, to Red Wolf Broadcasting for $8 million in January 2018; the sale was completed on March 29, 2018.

On New Years Days of 2023, FPR announced they would flip Oldies “Kool Radio” on WACM (AM) in Springfield, Massachusetts to Rhythmic CHR “Jammin 100.1”.

On May 10, 2024, RW completed the purchase for WZBG in Litchfield, Conn., from Local Girls & Boys Broadcasting Corp for $311,000.

In March 2026, WNBH and sister station WCTK were sold to Red Wolf Broadcasting, pending Federal Communications Commission approval.

== Company portfolio ==
As of Jan. 2024; Full Power Radio operates 6 stations, with 2 Rhythmic contemporary stations, 1 Adult contemporary station, 1 News/talk, 1 Oldies, and 1 Spanish tropical station.

=== Radio ===
Southeastern Massachusetts

- WCTK (Cat Country 98.1 FM)
- WNBH (BIG 101.3 FM)

Springfield, Massachusetts

- WACM (AM) (Jammin 100.1 FM)
- WSPR (AM) (Bomba 104.5 FM)

Northwestern Connecticut

- WZBG (Soft Rock 97.3 FM)
- WSNG (Talk of Connecticut 610 AM)

Greater Hartford, Connecticut

- WMRQ-FM (Radio 104.1 WMRQ) & (Bomba)
- WDRC (AM) (The Talk of Connecticut)
- WNTY (Kool Radio 990 AM)
- WBOM (Hartford's R&B Station 102.5 FM)
- WDRC-FM (The Whale 102.9 FM)

New London, Connecticut

- WSKP (AM) (Kool Radio 104.5 FM)
- WBMW (Soft Rock 106.5 FM)
- WWRX (FM) (Jammin' 107.7 FM)

Eastern Long Island & Southeastern Connecticut

- WJJF (94.9 FOX News, News Now)

== Formats ==
=== Bomba HD radio and translators ===
In November 2009, a Spanish-language tropical music format, "Bomba 97.5" ("The Bomb") was launched on WMRQ-FM HD2. The format was initially simulcasted on a 60-watt Bolton-licensed FM translator W248AB at 97.5 FM. Red Wolf later moved the translator to 97.1 FM (which forced a change of call letters to W246CC) to provide more coverage and increase signal strength. "Bomba 97.1" is now licensed for 100 watts, reaching as far as Springfield. In addition, the station added translators in Clinton and Bridgeport.

W272DO was sold to Red Wolf Broadcasting from Connoisseur Media in January 2018. On January 15, the translator immediately ceased simulcasting WPLR-HD2, the alternative format known as "Mod," and began carrying "Bomba."

==== Translators ====
Broadcast translators for WMRQ-FM HD2
Call sign	Frequency	City of license	FID	ERP (W)	HAAT	Class	Transmitter coordinates	FCC info
W246CC	97.1 FM	Bolton, Connecticut	82412	100	189 m (620 ft)	D	41°48′10.4″N 72°26′28.3″W	LMS
W283BS	104.5 FM	Bridgeport, Connecticut	15398	250	81.4 m (267 ft)	D	41°13′10.3″N 73°12′4.4″W	LMS
W258AL	99.5 FM	Clinton, Connecticut	139348	200	159 m (522 ft)	D	41°34′11.3″N 73°12′4.4″W	LMS
W272DO	102.3 FM	New Haven, Connecticut	138034	250	112 m (367 ft)	D	41°20′58.3″N 72°58′20.4″W	LMS
W283CK	104.5 FM	West Springfield, Massachusetts	60390	250	0 m (0 ft)	C	42°5′55″N 72°37′45″W	LMS
W253BQ-FM	98.5 FM	Meriden, Connecticut		250	0 m (0 ft)		41°33′44″N 72°50′38″W	

Broadcast translator for WMRQ-FM HD3
Call sign	Frequency	City of license	FID	ERP (W)	HAAT	Class	Transmitter coordinates	FCC info
W221CQ	92.1 FM	Naugatuck, Etc., Connecticut	15397	125	17 m (56 ft)	D	41°29′45.3″N 73°2′33.3″W	LMS

=== Jammin' HD radio and translators ===
On September 19, 2002, a Rhythmic contemporary music format was launched using the WHJM call sign.

On December 31, 2023, Full Power Radio announced WACM (AM) would flip to a rhythmic contemporary hit radio format branded as "Jammin 100.1" from its Oldies format.

==== Translators ====
Broadcast translators for Jammin' (FM)
Call sign	Frequency	City of license	FID	ERP (W)	HAAT	Class	FCC info
	107.7 FM	New London, Connecticut	58731	1,050	170 m (558 ft)	A	LMS
W261DD	100.1 FM	Springfield, Massachusetts	18717	250	81.4 m (267 ft)	B	LMS

=== Talk of Connecticut radio and translators ===
==== Translators ====
Broadcast translators for WDRC AM
Call sign	Frequency	City of license	FID	ERP (W)	Class	FCC info
WDRC (AM)	(1360 AM) FM	Hartford, Connecticut	7711	5,000	B	LMS
WSNG	(610 (AM)) FM	Torrington, Connecticut		250	B	
