= WMRQ-FM =

- Waterbury, Connecticut; United States
- Broadcast area: Greater Hartford; Greater New Haven
- Frequency: 104.1 MHz (HD Radio)
- Branding: Radio 104.1 WMRQ

Programming
- Format: Modern rock
- Subchannels: HD2: Bomba FM (tropical music); HD3: Simulcast of WFAR

Ownership
- Owner: Full Power Radio; (Red Wolf Broadcasting Corporation)
- Sister stations: WBOM; WDRC; WDRC-FM; WNTY; WSNG

History
- First air date: December 25, 1967
- Former call signs: WWCO-FM (1967–1972); WIOF (1972–1992); WYSR (1992–1995); WMRQ (1995–2003); WPHH (2003–2007); WURH (2007–2009)
- Call sign meaning: "Modern Rock"

Technical information
- Licensing authority: FCC
- Facility ID: 74279
- Class: B
- ERP: 14,000 watts
- HAAT: 255 meters (837 ft)
- Transmitter coordinates: 41.561°N 72.844°W
- Translators: HD2, and HD3: See § Translators

Links
- Public license information: Public file; LMS
- Webcast: Listen live; Listen live (HD2)
- Website: www.radio1041.com; HD2: www.bombaradio.com

WMRQ-FM (104.1 MHz) is a modern rock radio station licensed to Waterbury, Connecticut, and serving Greater Hartford and New Haven. WMRQ-FM is owned by Full Power Radio and has an effective radiated power (ERP) of 14,000 watts. Its transmitter is on West Peak in Meriden, Connecticut. WMRQ-FM's studios and offices are located on Blue Hills Avenue (Route 187) in Bloomfield, Connecticut, with its other co-owned radio stations.

The station broadcasts using HD Radio technology. Its HD2 digital sub-channel carries a Spanish tropical music and contemporary hit radio format known as "Bomba FM", also heard on translator stations 97.1 W246CC in Bolton, 99.5 W258AL in Clinton and 104.5 W283BS in Bridgeport. Much of the programming is also broadcast on WSPR (1490 AM) and W283CK (104.5 FM) in West Springfield, Massachusetts, as well as 98.5 W253BQ in Meriden, and 104.5 W283BW in New London. Its HD3 sub-channel carries a simulcast of WFAR, an ethnic and Christian radio station in Danbury; the sub-channel also feeds WFAR's programming to translator station 92.1 W221CQ in Naugatuck and the HD2 sub-channel of W283BS in Bridgeport.

== History ==
=== Country music ===
On December 25, 1967, the station signed on as WWCO-FM. It was the sister station to WWCO (1240 AM), and carried a country music format. Most radios at the time did not receive FM signals, so the station was largely automated, with pre-recorded announcements.

It was acquired by entertainer and TV host Merv Griffin in 1972, changing its call letters to WIOF (standing for "1-0-Four", its dial position). The country music sound was branded as "Nashville Connecticut, W-104".

=== Magic 104 ===
In 1978, the station dropped country to become soft adult contemporary-formatted "Magic 104" using the syndicated "TM Beautiful Rock" service. During the switch to "Magic", WIOF upgraded its signal by moving its transmitter from near its studios in Prospect to West Peak in Meriden.

Lou Terri was the program director and midday host until his death in an automobile accident in 1989. Steve Wiersman later became program director until 1994. Morning announcers included Bill Cleveland, Greg O'Brien and Ray Petraca. Jack Carney, who was also the voice of WVIT at the time, hosted the afternoon show. Jim Scott did nights, followed by Joe Dufrat who did the Mid-6 am shift. Rick O'Connor did middays, later replaced by Ron O'Brien (also known as Ron O, who later went to WZMX). Weekend DJs included Greg LaPorta and Don Clark.

=== Star 104.1 ===
In 1992, the station rebranded as "Star 104.1", WYSR, with a more uptempo adult contemporary sound. DJs on "Star" included Brett Provo in mornings, then afternoons (later becoming afternoon drive/production director at WMAS in Springfield); Paul DeFrancisco in afternoons; Jay Hanson (later at WFMX in Skowhegan, Maine) and Long John on weekends; Jim Severine; Rich Kilbourne (also known as Big Rich Baker) on news; Cathy Foxx in middays; Neil Jackson in mornings; Lee Gordon as Production Director; Annette Grella as Promotions Director; and Race Bannon, who later stayed on the station after the flip to modern rock. Ron O became WYSR's PD after Steve Wiersman departed in August 1994 (after being hired as the new PD at WBUF in Buffalo, New York)

Star 104.1 was competing with other AC stations in the Hartford radio market and was unable to capture a sizable audience. In October 1994 all programming staff and disc jockeys were released.

=== Radio 104 ===
On October 31, 1994, at midnight, the format flipped to modern rock as WMRQ "Radio104". Personalities such as "Jake & Beth", "Nick the Intern", "Mudbone", Dee Snider and Bubba the Love Sponge were on the station in the mornings at various points during the station's history, with Wilcow, Chaz, "Darkside Dave", The Carlito Show, and Logan following after the mornings.

The station also hosted popular annual events such as "The Big Day Off" and "104fest". Lee Gordon remained as production director, and Bud Fisher became WMRQ's first sales manager. (Bud had appeared on "Magic 104" as "Gary Hunter".)

=== Power 104 ===
Due to struggling ratings, the station flipped to WPHH, "Power 104.1", at 5:00 p.m. on September 15, 2003. As a station playing hip hop music and rhythmic contemporary hits, WPHH solidified its position as the only mainstream urban station in the Hartford and New Haven market. Its main competitor was urban-leaning rhythmic CHR WZMX.

Nicole Siedman served as program director for a short period until 2004. Mychal Maguire assumed the program director position thereafter. Spank Buda served as assistant program director and night host for the entire duration of WPHH. Popular events included the "Hoop It Up" basketball tournament and the "Legends of Hip Hop" concert. Other DJs on "Power" were Mia Mendez, DJ Showtime, TT Torrez, DJ Londonn, and PJ.

=== Return to alternative rock ===
On October 25, 2007, at 10:00 am, WPHH flipped back to modern rock. The station was programmed similar to WRFF in Philadelphia. On December 20, 2007, WPHH changed its call letters to WURH. In May 2008, almost six months after Clear Channel launched "FM 104-One", the station named a program director, Becky Pohotsky, who had been the station's APD/MD and de facto PD for most of its existence.

On August 4, 2008, Clear Channel placed the station's assets into an entity called the Aloha Station Trust to sell off the station. This was due to Clear Channel being above the ownership limits set by the Federal Communications Commission. These limits were imposed when Clear Channel was officially taken private by Bain Capital Partners on July 30, 2008.

=== Full Power Radio ===
On February 19, 2009, Ledyard-based Red Wolf Broadcasting Corp. (doing business as Full Power Radio) who owns WBMW and WWRX in the New London area, announced that it had agreed to buy WURH for $8,000,000. On May 14, 2009, Red Wolf Broadcasting took over control of the station. The first action was to change the station's callsign to WMRQ-FM, and restore the "Radio 104.1" moniker.

== Bomba HD radio and translators ==
Logo before 101.7 translator sign on

In November 2009, a Spanish-language tropical music format, "Bomba 97.5" ("The Bomb") was launched on WMRQ-FM HD2. The format was initially simulcast on 60-watt Bolton-licensed FM translator W248AB at 97.5 FM. Red Wolf later moved the translator to 97.1 FM (which forced a change of call letters to W246CC) to provide more coverage and increase signal strength. "Bomba 97.1" is now licensed for 100 watts, reaching as far as Springfield. In addition, the station added translators in Clinton and Bridgeport.

W272DO was sold to Red Wolf Broadcasting from Connoisseur Media in January 2018. On January 15, the translator immediately ceased simulcasting WPLR-HD2, the alternative format known as "Mod", and began carrying "Bomba".

=== Translators ===
Broadcast translators for WMRQ-FM HD2
Call sign	Frequency	City of license	FID	ERP (W)	HAAT	Class	Transmitter coordinates	FCC info
W246CC	97.1 FM	Bolton, Connecticut	82412	100	189 m (620 ft)	D	41°48′10.4″N 72°26′28.3″W	LMS
W283BS	104.5 FM	Bridgeport, Connecticut	15398	250	81.4 m (267 ft)	D	41°13′10.3″N 73°12′4.4″W	LMS
W258AL	99.5 FM	Clinton, Connecticut	139348	200	159 m (522 ft)	D	41°34′11.3″N 73°12′4.4″W	LMS
W272DO	102.3 FM	New Haven, Connecticut	138034	250	112 m (367 ft)	D	41°20′58.3″N 72°58′20.4″W	LMS

Broadcast translator for WMRQ-FM HD3
Call sign	Frequency	City of license	FID	ERP (W)	HAAT	Class	Transmitter coordinates	FCC info
W221CQ	92.1 FM	Naugatuck, Etc., Connecticut	15397	125	17 m (56 ft)	D	41°29′45.3″N 73°2′33.3″W	LMS
