= WWRX =

WWRX may refer to:

- WWRX (FM), a radio station (107.7 MHz) licensed to Bradford, Rhode Island, United States
- WSKP (AM), a radio station (1180 kHz) licensed to Hope Valley, Rhode Island, United States, which held the call sign WWRX from December 2013 through April 2014
- WVEI-FM, a radio station (103.7 MHz) licensed to Westerly, Rhode Island, United States, which held the call signs WWRX and WWRX-FM from the late 1980s-early 2000s
