= WSKP =

WSKP may refer to:

- WSKP (AM), a radio station (1180 AM) licensed to Hope Valley, Rhode Island, United States
- WWRX (FM), a radio station (107.7 FM) licensed to Ledyard, Connecticut, United States, which used the call sign WSKP from 2013 to 2014
- WMFM, a radio station (107.9 FM) licensed to Key West, Florida, United States, which used the call sign WSKP from 1993 to 1997
- WWLL, a radio station (105.7 FM) licensed to Sebring, Florida, United States, which used the call signs WSKP and WSKP-FM from 1978 to 1984
