= Cedar Island (Clinton, Connecticut) =

- Coordinates: 41°15′56″N 72°31′33″W
- Country: United States
- State: Connecticut
- County: Middlesex
- Town: Clinton
- Elevation: 3.3 ft (1 m)

Population
  - Total: 100 to 150 (summer)

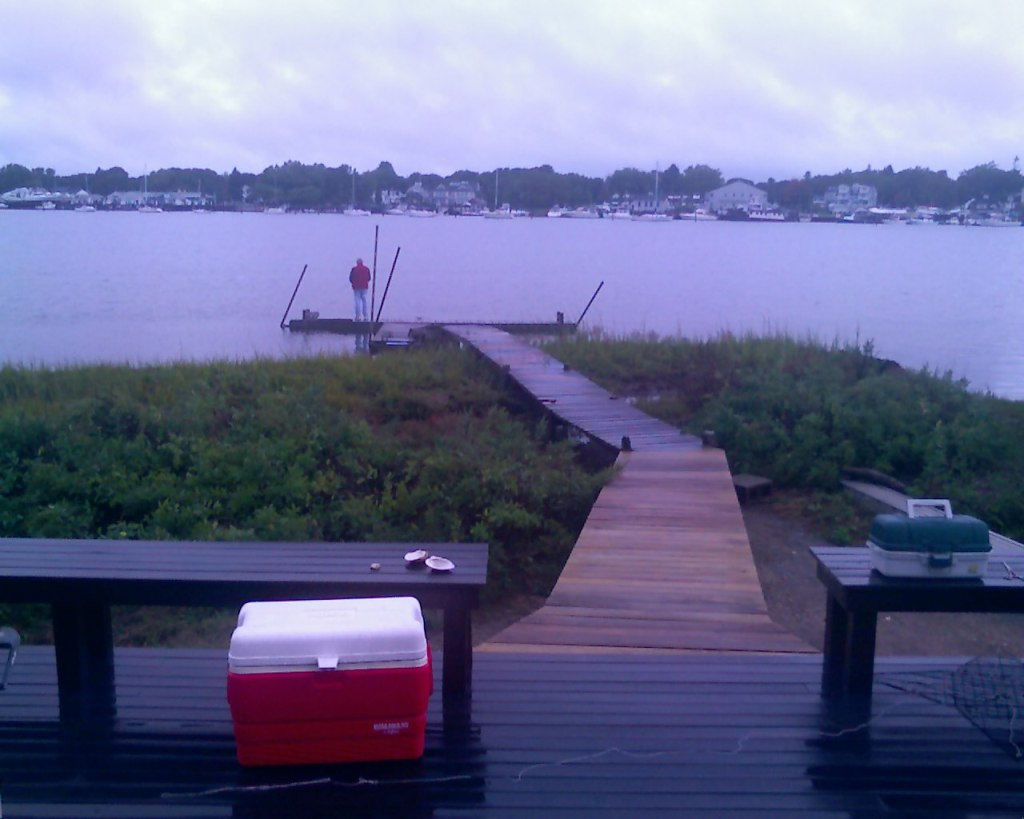
Clinton Marina from a dock on the northern side of Cedar Island.

Cedar Island is a former island in Long Island Sound belonging to the town of Clinton, Connecticut in Middlesex County, Connecticut. Currently the island is a peninsula attached to Hammonasset State Park in Madison, Connecticut due to the filling of the strait in a public works project to improve flow of the Hammonasset River through Clinton Harbor.

== Physical description ==
The average elevation is 3 feet (0.91 m) at high tide; low tide can add 5 to 6 feet (1.5 to 1.8 m).

The island measures one and a half miles long by a quarter-mile wide and lies about a quarter of a mile from Clinton Harbor. It has about 54 houses and summer cottages (mostly built before 1950). Many have piers for boats and fishing. The normal summertime population of the island is between 100 and 150 people.

The undeveloped western two-thirds of the island form one of the few unimproved areas of shoreline along the Connecticut coast. Notable vegetation includes salt marsh and salt meadow cord grasses (Spartina species) beach plum (Prunus maritima), rugosa rose (Rosa rugosa), and juniper trees that are referred to locally as "cedars" (Juniperus virginiana). Abundant bird life is also present on the island. Protected nesting areas for the piping plover (Charadrius melodus) are provided in the spring. The American oystercatcher (Haematopus palliatus) is frequently viewed along with the osprey (Pandion haliaetus) and other seabirds common to Long Island Sound shore.

== Amenities ==
The island does not have grid electricity or telephones, the sole exception being a solar powered telephone on the town dock connected directly to the Clinton Police Department for emergencies. Many of the houses and cottages use propane for heat and hot water, while some also have solar power.

The island is serviced by a public water supply, and the water system serving the homes is seasonal. A permanent water line has been installed to the island providing year round fire protection from a single hydrant. The project was completed over budget amid allegations of embezzlement.

== Transportation ==
All transportation to and from the island is by boat. There is no airstrip or bridge, and foot travel via Hammonasset is possible but difficult due to the salt marsh conditions.

The closest port is Cedar Island Marina, approximately a quarter mile north.

There are five roads on the island, forming a rough sideways "figure 8" pattern. Hammonasett Avenue and Central Avenue run roughly east–west. Wigwam Street, Indian Street and Fort Lane run roughly north–south. The roads cannot handle vehicle traffic.
