= Liberty Green =

Liberty Green may refer to:

- Liberty Green Historic District, in Clinton, Connecticut
- Liberty Green (Louisville, Kentucky), a redevelopment housing project in Phoenix Hill, Louisville neighborhood
