= WZKZ =

Simulcasts WRYM New Britain
- Bridgeport, Connecticut; United States
- Broadcast area: Greater Bridgeport
- Frequency: 1450 kHz
- Branding: Viva Radio

Programming
- Language: Spanish
- Format: Contemporary hit radio
- Affiliations: Premiere Networks

Ownership
- Owner: David Webster; (Trignition Media, LLC)
- Sister stations: WRYM; WWCO

History
- First air date: September 22, 1941
- Former call signs: WNAB (1941–1985); WJBX (1985–1989); WCUM (1989–2026)

Technical information
- Licensing authority: FCC
- Facility ID: 54553
- Class: C
- Power: 1,000 watts (unlimited)
- Transmitter coordinates: 41°13′10.35″N 73°12′6.41″W
- Translators: 103.3 W277DP (Bridgeport); 105.5 W288DL (Stamford)

Links
- Public license information: Public file; LMS
- Webcast: Listen live
- Website: www.vivazona.com

WZKZ (1450 kHz) is a radio station broadcasting a Spanish-language contemporary hit radio format licensed to Bridgeport, Connecticut, United States. WZKZ transmits with 1,000 watts of power. It is also heard on FM translators W277DP 103.3 MHz in Bridgeport, and W288DL on 105.5 MHz in Stamford. The transmitter and studios are both located on State Street and Chopsey Road in Bridgeport. The station is owned by David Webster, through licensee Trignition Media, LLC. WZKZ is a simulcast of WRYM (840 AM) in New Britain and WWCO (1240 AM) in Waterbury.

== History ==
The station was known as WNAB until March 1985, when it left the air. It returned with an oldies format later that year as WJBX and became WCUM (Radio Cumbre) in 1989.

WCUM was purchased by David Webster of Trignition Media, LLC on June 11, 2023. On July 11, 2023, WCUM began simulcasting WRYM. It changed call signs to WZKZ on August 11, 2026.

== Translators ==
Call sign	Frequency	City of license	FID	ERP (W)	Class	Transmitter coordinates	FCC info
W277DP	103.3 FM	Bridgeport, Connecticut	200726	250	D	41°9′58.3″N 73°13′1.4″W	LMS
W288DL	105.5 FM	Stamford, Connecticut	24109	10	D	41°6′54.6″N 73°26′3.4″W	LMS
