= WBOM =

- Meriden, Connecticut; United States
- Broadcast area: Central Connecticut
- Frequency: 1470 kHz
- Branding: 102.5 Hartford's R&B Station

Programming
- Format: Urban adult contemporary
- Affiliations: Premiere Networks

Ownership
- Owner: Full Power Radio; (Red Wolf Broadcasting Corporation)
- Sister stations: WDRC; WDRC-FM; WMRQ-FM; WNTY; WSNG

History
- First air date: June 8, 1947
- Former call signs: WMMB (1947, CP); WMMW (1947–2020)

Technical information
- Licensing authority: FCC
- Facility ID: 1220
- Class: B
- Power: 2,500 watts
- Transmitter coordinates: 41°33′14.35″N 72°48′5.35″W
- Translator: 102.5 W273DS (Meriden)

Links
- Public license information: Public file; LMS
- Webcast: Listen live
- Website: www.hartfords1025.com

WBOM (1470 AM) is a commercial radio station licensed to serve Meriden, Connecticut, and covering Central Connecticut. The station broadcasts an urban adult contemporary format, aimed at the Hartford area. The station is owned by Full Power Radio, through Red Wolf Broadcasting Corporation. WBOM's programming is also heard on FM translator W273DS (102.5); the station's branding emphasizes the FM frequency.

== History ==
The station's original construction permit was granted by the Federal Communications Commission on January 2, 1947; it was initially assigned the call sign WMMB, but changed to WMMW on March 4. It began broadcasting June 8, 1947, on 1470 kHz with 1,000 watts of power. The station was licensed to Silver City Crystal Company. An FM sister station, WMMW-FM (95.7), would be added by that December.

On March 5, 2014, Buckley Broadcasting announced that it would sell its Connecticut radio stations, including WMMW, to Connoisseur Media. The sale was completed on July 7, 2014, at a price of $7,922,035. Connoisseur sold WMMW, along with the other Talk of Connecticut stations (except for WWCO in Waterbury), WDRC-FM in Hartford, and W272DO in New Haven, to Red Wolf Broadcasting for $8 million in January 2018; the sale was completed on March 29, 2018.

The call sign was changed to WBOM on April 28, 2020. The station went silent in March 2022, and returned as "The New 102.5" on March 11, 2022.

== Translator ==
| Call sign | Frequency | City of license | FID | ERP (W) | Class | Transmitter coordinates | FCC info |
|---|---|---|---|---|---|---|---|
| W273DS | 102.5 FM | Meriden, Connecticut | 202641 | 250 | D | 41°42′13″N 72°49′55″W | LMS |
