= WDRC-FM =

- Hartford, Connecticut; United States
- Broadcast area: Greater Hartford
- Frequency: 102.9 MHz (HD Radio)
- Branding: 102.9 The Whale

Programming
- Format: Classic rock
- Subchannels: HD2: "Big D 103" (oldies); HD3: Simulcast of WDRC (talk radio)

Ownership
- Owner: John Fuller; (Red Wolf Broadcasting Corporation)
- Sister stations: WBOM; WDRC; WMRQ-FM; WNTY; WSNG; WZBG

History
- First air date: October 26, 1959
- Call sign meaning: Doolittle Radio Corporation (founder of AM sister station)

Technical information
- Licensing authority: FCC
- Facility ID: 7718
- Class: B
- ERP: 19,500 watts horizontal; 19,540 watts vertical
- HAAT: 247 meters (810 ft)
- Transmitter coordinates: 41.562°N 72.844°W

Links
- Public license information: Public file; LMS
- Webcast: Listen live (via TuneIn)
- Website: www.1029thewhale.com

WDRC-FM (102.9 FM) is a radio station with a classic rock format, licensed to serve Hartford, Connecticut. It is owned by John Fuller's Red Wolf Broadcasting Corporation, with studios located on Blue Hills Avenue (Route 187) in Bloomfield, Connecticut, and its transmitter site is located on West Peak in Meriden, Connecticut.

== History ==
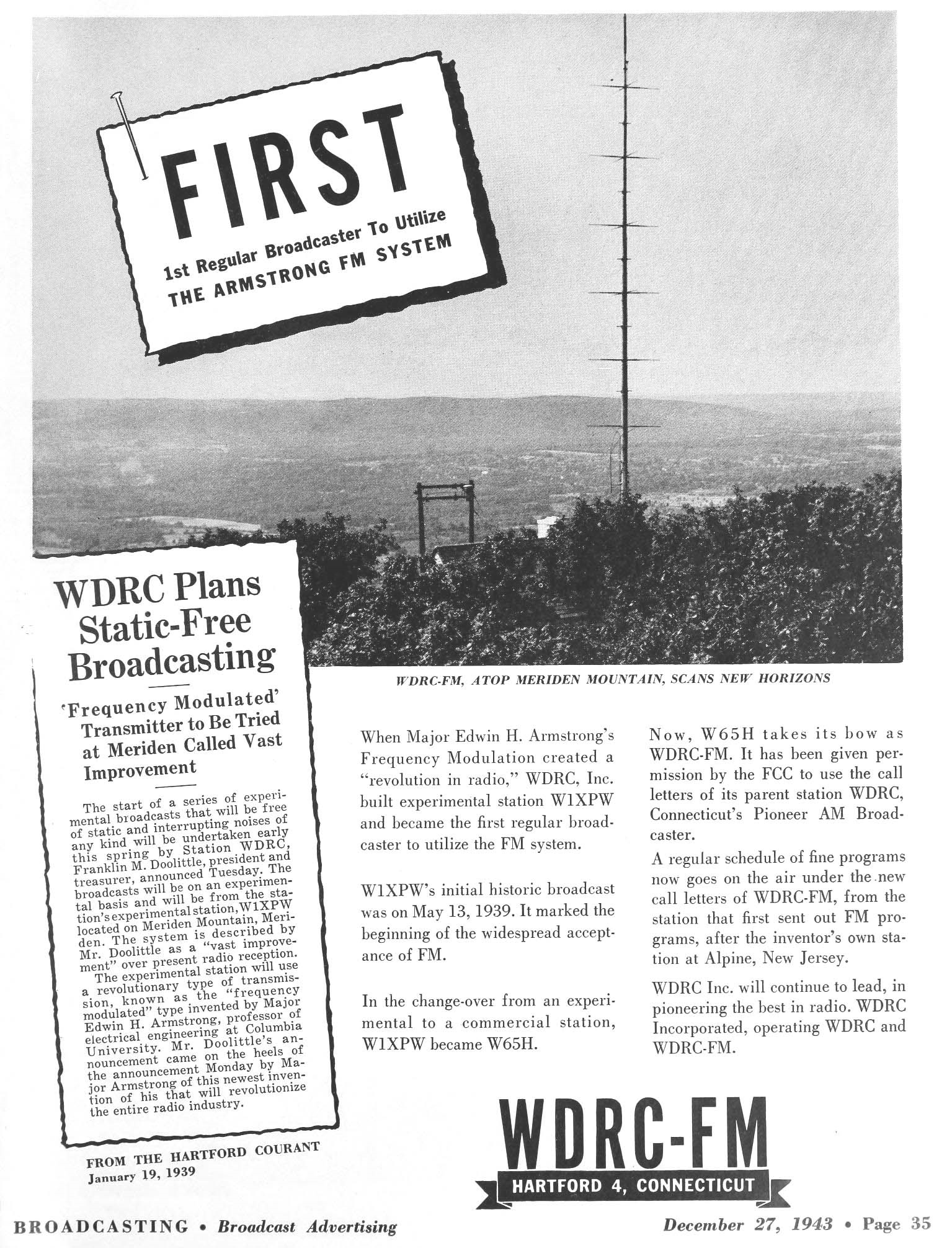
WDRC-FM advertisement from 1943.

WDRC-FM traces its roots to the Doolittle Radio Company, which established what would become WDRC (AM) in 1922. In 1941, Doolittle upgraded an experimental FM station to a commercial license and used the call letters WDRC-FM. Doolittle sold the FM station in 1956 to General Broadcasting Corporation and the AM station in 1959 to Buckley Broadcasting. Buckley inherited a second FM license, which it used to establish the current WDRC-FM. The original WDRC-FM is now WHCN.

The current WDRC-FM was issued a program test authority by the FCC on October 26, 1959. It officially signed on at 8:15 p.m. that same day. On August 31, 1966, WDRC-FM increased power from 7,000 to 17,500 watts, then to 50,000 watts the following May. It began broadcasting in stereo in September 1969. In 1973, the station began calling itself "Big D 103," and employed a Top 40 format. In 1977, the station flipped to album rock, with a much deeper playlist than its rivals WCCC (AM), WCCC-FM, and WHCN. However, by 1979, the station leaned Rock/AC, and then abruptly flipped back to Top 40 in early 1980. By 1984, WDRC-FM was an oldies-based adult contemporary station, but only played oldies on the weekends. Due to positive listener feedback, on September 26, 1986, WDRC-FM became an oldies station full-time. At that point, the station focused on hits of 1964 to 1969, with about four songs per hour from the 1955-63 era. The station also played about one song from the early 1970s per hour. The AM station also offered oldies until 1990. Core artists included The Beatles, The Four Seasons, Elvis Presley, Supremes, Everly Brothers, Temptations, The Hollies, The Righteous Brothers, and Dion, among others. The station also had quite high ratings, even being number one at least a few times.

The format continued throughout the 1990s and into the 2000s virtually unchanged. In August 2000, WDRC-FM stopped using the "Big D 103" name and became known as "Oldies 102.9 DRC-FM." The station stopped referring to themselves as "Oldies" a short time later. In 2001, WDRC-FM began playing several songs from the 1970s, adding artists like Billy Joel, Doobie Brothers, Eagles, James Taylor, and others into the mix. The station also began adding about a dozen or so songs from the 1980s by oldies artists, playing about one every couple of hours. It also began decreasing music from the pre-1964 era; eventually, all the pre-1964 oldies were eliminated, and a lot of 1980s music was added to the mix, becoming more of a classic hits station. The station also became heavily based in the 1970s, playing only a few 1960s songs per hour along with about the same amount of 1980s' hits. To appease traditional oldies fans, WDRC-FM launched an internet radio station playing music from 1955 to 1964.

In the winter of 2007, WDRC-FM slowly phased out most of the 1980s music, cutting that back to about one every couple hours. The station also increased the 1964 to 1969 era, making those songs core hits once again on a gradual basis. The amount of 1970s music was cut back slightly to about 5 per hour. The station even brought back select songs from the 1950s and early 1960s, playing them about once every 90 minutes. By 2008, the station began increasing 1980s songs to about one per hour. Its HD2 station now plays a blend of 1950s' and 1960s' oldies focusing on the pre-1964 era.

In the early 2010s, the main station identified itself as "Good Time Rock 'n' Roll", while occasionally using in the "Big D" moniker. Its music playlist once again focused on the 1960s from 1964 on, while also emphasizing 1970s hits and including a few 1980s songs. Jingles were also reintroduced in 2008. In late 2008, the station started adding reverb to the audio chain as well as improving the audio processing, thus improving the overall audio quality of the station.

In 2011, Richard D. Buckley, Jr., president of Buckley Radio since 1972, died. On March 5, 2014, Buckley Broadcasting announced that it would sell its Connecticut radio stations, including WDRC-FM, to Connoisseur Media. The sale was consummated on July 7, 2014, at a price of $7,922,035.

On July 7, 2014, WDRC-FM changed its name to "102.9 DRC", and modified its slogan to "Classic Hits of the 70s, 80s and More." In addition, a majority of the station's airstaff was let go.

On January 20, 2015, at 10:29 am, after briefly stunting with a loop of the old Hartford Whalers theme "Brass Bonanza", WDRC-FM changed its format to classic rock, branded as "102.9 The Whale".

On January 15, 2018, it was announced that the station was sold to Red Wolf Broadcasting Corporation. The deal included sister station "Talk of Connecticut" WDRC 1360 Hartford and two of its three simulcasts, WMMW 1470 Meriden and WSNG 610 Torrington, and translator W272DO 102.3 New Haven.

== HD Radio ==
In 2008, WDRC-FM implemented HD Radio technology.

=== WDRC-HD2 ===
HD2 is known as The Big D, uses old DRC-FM jingles, and plays mostly 1950s to mid-1960s oldies that the main channel does not (though the main channel played a handful of such songs up until its format adjustment in July 2014). It also mixes in a moderate amount of mid-to-late 1960s oldies as well.

=== WDRC-HD3 ===
HD3 carries AM 1360 WDRC's talk format.
