= Cedar Island Marina =

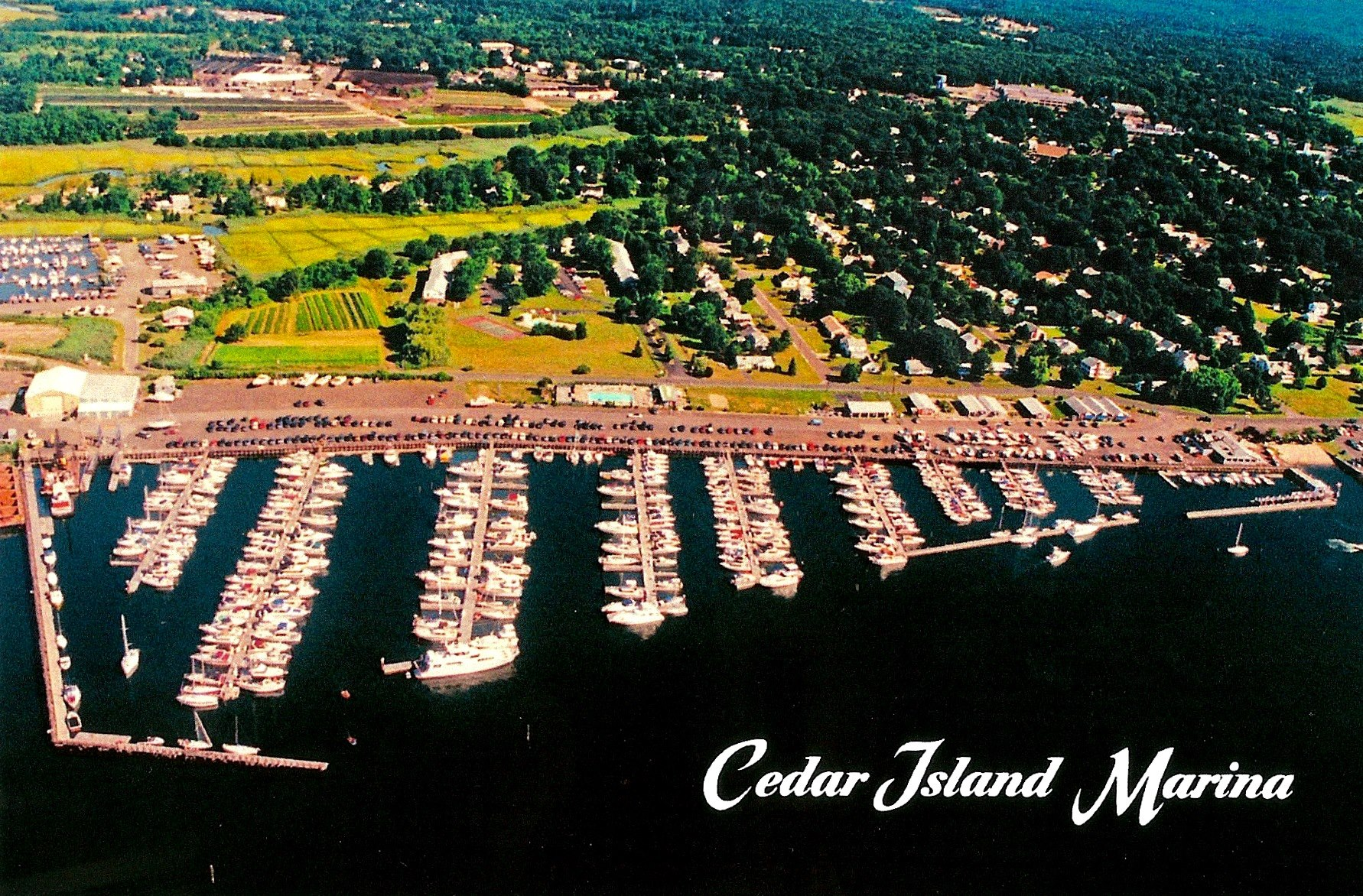
- Cedar Island Marina
- Interactive map of Cedar Island Marina

Location
- Country: United States
- Location: Clinton, Connecticut
- Coordinates: 41.2677°N 72.5349°W

Details
- Opened: 1974; 52 years ago
- Owned by: Shapiro Family
- Type of Harbor: Artificial
- No. of berths: 400 slips
- Postal code: 06413

Statistics
- Website http://www.cedarislandmarina.com

Cedar Island Marina, located on Long Island Sound in Clinton, Connecticut, United States, is a boatyard with 400 slips. It was operating at 94 percent of capacity in 1995, with many transient visitors filling slips vacated when home-port vessels were away. Three boats are year-round "live-aboards". Boat sizes range from less than 21 feet (6.4 m) to 120 feet (37 m), with 76 percent between 21 and 35 feet (11 m) and 19 percent longer than that; 35 percent are sailboats. In addition to slips, the marina has retail services—a ship's store carrying groceries, ice, bait and tackle, a used-boat brokerage, a fuel dock and a pumpout. Launching and haul-out are available with a 30-ton travel lift and a "giraffe" crane for indoor and outdoor winter boat storage. Repair services include fiberglass, hull and engine repair; painting; sail-rigging; sail-making; welding and metal fabrication; and boat-bottom cleaning.

Within a two-mile radius there are eight other marinas and boatyards, with an estimated total boat population of 2,000. The main boating season begins in May and ends in October. Cedar Island Marina was bought by the Shapiro family in 1974, and converted from a fuel terminal built in 1964. Jeffrey Shapiro is also a general partner in the Clinton Harbor Boat Show each July.

== Research and budget ==
In 1995, the marina spent $38,500 to staff and operate its private research laboratory (which includes two full-time marine biologists). Its aquaculture project and public-display aquariums attracted new boating families into slips for the season and helped retain other customers, resulting in an estimated $46,000 gross slip income. The special docks, designed by Cedar Island for the aquaculture project, cost the company no more than conventional docks. Marina management estimates that the aquaculture project brings them around $5,000 worth of publicity each year and has extended their dredging season, saving another $5,000 annually.

The Cedar Island Marine Research Laboratory is owned, operated, and funded as part of the marina; its laboratory and in-water field station are also in the marina. Studies have included the assessment and long-term monitoring of water quality, marina habitat, coastal birds and fish communities in the marina, compared with other natural habitats in Clinton Harbor.

Noticing that many marine species grew more rapidly and remained healthy under marina docks and boats, Shapiro's lab staff began growing shellfish on trays suspended below the floating docks. They found that the shellfish grew faster than those placed in neighboring natural-marsh flats and were equally safe for human consumption. Oysters, it was determined, could be grown to market size one year faster under boat docks than outside the marina basin.

Two factors inhibit the use of marinas for oyster farming:

- U.S. Food and Drug Administration standards require filter-feeding oysters to be relocated to cleaner waters for several months of purification before being eaten; the extra handling is costly.
- Oysters take four years to grow to market size. Shapiro switched to another shellfish (bay scallops), solving both problems.

== Facilities ==
- Fuel dock
- Year-round restaurant
- Playground overlooking the water
- Children's activities director and in-ground pool (seasonal)
- 12-seat (Hot tub|whirlpool)
- Professional repairs and laundromat
- Cable TV and entertainment
- Unlimited pumpouts
- Seasonal shuttle bus to nearby stores
