= Liberty Green Historic District =

Historic district in Connecticut, United States

Coordinates: 41.2771°N 72.5173°W

Liberty Green Historic District is a local historic district in the town of Clinton, Connecticut, and Liberty Green is a triangular town green within it. The district was created in 1979 following a lengthy study, report and enabling ordinance

== Description ==
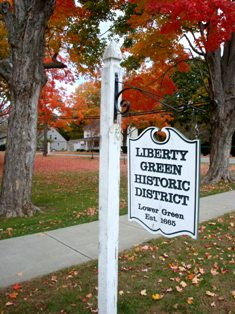
Liberty Green Historic District Sign on Lower Green

The Liberty Green Historic District consists of six 18th-century houses and stone walls surrounding a triangular common. The six contiguous properties included within the district are defined on the National Register of Historic Places and consist of four Colonial structures, one Federal/Greek Revival, and one undefined style structure. The corner property of Liberty Street and East Main Street is an established bed and breakfast.

The district is located within the larger, National Register of Historic Places-listed Clinton Village Historic District.

== History ==
A vestige of 17th-century common land, Liberty Green is a park-like triangle between Liberty Street and East Main Street, encompassing the village green. The common town land was part of a larger open space for militia war drills, and was also the site of one of Clinton's earliest schoolhouses. The Liberty Green Historic District was chosen as the site for the town's Civil War monument (a granite soldier atop a tall pedestal), and a small cannon from the War of 1812.

Beginning in 1846, a group of citizens banded together to plant shade trees and Liberty Green came to assume its present park-like appearance and function. In addition to providing a peaceful public open space, it served a symbolic function, recalling the town's patriotic past and providing the site for memorials to the town's soldiers.

In 2010, the Liberty Green retail complex, located across the street from the historic district, was set to be completed with the construction of a two-story building affording 5,500 square feet (510 m^{2}) of retail space and three second-story apartments.
