= WSNG =

Satellite of WDRC, Hartford
- Torrington, Connecticut; United States
- Frequency: 610 kHz
- Branding: Talk of Connecticut

Programming
- Format: Talk radio
- Affiliations: Compass Media Networks; Fox News Radio; Salem Radio Network; Westwood One; New York Yankees Radio Network

Ownership
- Owner: Red Wolf Broadcasting; (Red Wolf Broadcasting Corporation)
- Sister stations: WBOM; WDRC; WDRC-FM; WMRQ-FM; WNTY; WZBG

History
- First air date: January 29, 1948
- Former call signs: WTOR (1948–1973)
- Former frequencies: 1490 kHz (1948–1964)

Technical information
- Licensing authority: FCC
- Facility ID: 13716
- Class: B
- Power: 1,000 watts (day); 500 watts (night)
- Transmitter coordinates: 41°45′28.4″N 73°3′4.4″W
- Translator: 104.5 W283DO (Torrington)

Links
- Public license information: Public file; LMS
- Webcast: Listen live
- Website: www.talkofconnecticut.com

WSNG (610 AM) is a radio station licensed in Torrington, Connecticut, broadcasting a talk radio format. WSNG is simulcasting 1360 WDRC (AM), Hartford. The stations use the slogan "The Talk of Connecticut" featuring Mornings with Gary Byron and syndicated programs the rest of the day, including Michael Savage. The station is owned by Red Wolf Broadcasting and features programming from Fox News Radio, Salem Radio Network, and Westwood One. The Talk of Connecticut stations also broadcast sporting events such as New York Yankees major league baseball, New Britain Rock Cats minor league baseball, Hartford Hawks college basketball and high school sports.

WSNG is powered at 1,000 watts by day; to avoid interfering with other stations on 610 AM, it reduces power at night to 500 watts. It uses a directional antenna at all times. Its programming is also heard on 250-watt translator W283DO (104.5 FM) in Torrington.

== History ==
WSNG was originally signed on in the late 1940s as WTOR which transmitted from 93 Perkins Street with 250 watts on 1490kc. It moved the transmitter to Harwinton in 1964 (WBZY was forced to shut down) after being granted 1 kW day 500w night with a three-tower directional array on 610 kc (most likely due to WGCH in Greenwich, Connecticut launching later that same year). It was then owned by Edmund Willian Waller. The callsign change came after the station was acquired by new owners at a date later than 1966.

The format at WSNG was full service radio throughout the 1970s and '80s. Many popular personalities worked at WSNG including "Captain" Jay Sheldon, Dan Lovallo and news anchor Jeff Zeiner. During the mid-1980s these personalities left and the format shifted to "consumer" radio. That format proved unpopular and an abortive attempt of returning to full service radio failed. New competition from WZBG caused the station to go dark in the 1990s.

Buckley Broadcasting purchased the station before it would have permanently lost its license. It now simulcasts WDRC as part of the Talk of Connecticut network.

On March 5, 2014, Buckley Broadcasting announced that it would sell its Connecticut radio stations, including WSNG, to Connoisseur Media. The sale was consummated on July 7, 2014, at a price of $7,922,035. Connoisseur sold WSNG, along with the other Talk of Connecticut stations (except for WWCO in Waterbury), WDRC-FM in Hartford, and W272DO in New Haven, to Red Wolf Broadcasting for $8 million in January 2018; the sale was completed on March 29, 2018.
