= WJJF =

- Montauk, New York; United States
- Broadcast area: Eastern Long Island; Southeastern Connecticut
- Frequency: 94.9 MHz
- Branding: 94.9 News Now

Programming
- Language: English
- Format: news/talk
- Affiliations: Fox News Radio

Ownership
- Owner: Full Power Radio; (Red Wolf Broadcasting Corporation)
- Sister stations: WBMW; WSKP; WWRX

History
- First air date: February 27, 2012
- Call sign meaning: John J. Fuller (station owner)

Technical information
- Licensing authority: FCC
- Facility ID: 189488
- Class: A
- ERP: 5,600 watts
- HAAT: 104 meters (341 ft)
- Transmitter coordinates: 41°1′56.3″N 71°58′30.2″W

Links
- Public license information: Public file; LMS
- Website: www.949newsnow.com

WJJF (94.9 FM) is a radio station licensed to Montauk, New York, and serving the eastern Long Island and southeastern Connecticut areas. The station is owned by Full Power Radio (controlled by John Fuller), and offers a news/talk format. WJJF signed on February 27, 2012.
