= WNTY =

Radio station in Southington–Hartford, Connecticut

Simulcasts WSKP, Hope Valley, Rhode Island
- Southington, Connecticut; United States
- Broadcast area: Greater Hartford
- Frequency: 990 kHz
- Branding: Kool Radio

Programming
- Format: Oldies

Ownership
- Owner: John Fuller; (Red Wolf Broadcasting Corporation)
- Sister stations: WACM; WBOM; WDRC; WDRC-FM; WMRQ-FM; WSKP; WSNG

History
- First air date: September 2, 1969
- Former call signs: WFCS (CP; 1964–1968); WNTY (1969–2003); WXCT (2003–2016)

Technical information
- Licensing authority: FCC
- Facility ID: 73352
- Class: D
- Power: 2,500 watts day; 80 watts night
- Transmitter coordinates: 41°34′59.35″N 72°52′59.37″W
- Translator: 96.1 W241CG (Southington)

Links
- Public license information: Public file; LMS
- Webcast: Listen live
- Website: www.koololdiesradio.net

WNTY (990 AM) is an oldies radio station licensed to Southington, Connecticut, and serving the Hartford area. The station is owned by John Fuller, through licensee Red Wolf Broadcasting Corporation, and broadcasts with 2.5 kilowatts daytime and 80 watts nighttime from a studio and tower site on Old Turnpike Road in Southington.

== History ==
After WBZY, a station in Torrington that operated on 990 kHz, was shut down, an application for a new station on the same frequency in Southington was made in 1964. The new station, WNTY went on September 2, 1969, initially as a daytime-only radio station. WNTY's original format would continue in some form until early 1999 when the death of then-owner Donato F. Sarapo, who had purchased the station from the original owners, led to WNTY being sold to ADD Radio Group for $850,000.

=== La Brava 990 ===
In April 1999, WNTY was leased by Hartford-based El Principe Communications.La Brava would last until September 15, 2000, when ADD Radio terminated El Principe's lease for reasons including non-payment of rent. In retaliation, El Principe vandalized WNTY's studios and transmitter which kept the station off the air for two weeks. The station would return to the air that October with an automated variety of music plus high school football and the Sunday brokered programming, as well as a Christian music program "Play it Again God" targeted at Christian youth and young adults.

=== Xact Radio, 990 The X ===
In April 2003, the 990 frequency would see a big change on paper as the WNTY calls were cast aside after 34 years and replaced by new calls of WXCT, chosen for the new slogan of Xact Radio, 990 The X.

=== Spanish-language religion ===
On Tuesday May 8, 2007, it was announced that WXCT would be dropping its all-talk format and flipping to a foreign language format on Friday, May 11. WXCT officially switched to Spanish-language religious programming at 3:30 p.m. on Thursday, May 10, 2007.

=== Kool Radio ===
Following Red Wolf Broadcasting's 2015 acquisition from Davidson Media Group of WXCT and a sister station in Springfield, Massachusetts, WSPR (1490 AM), the stations' oldies format was merged with Red Wolf-owned oldies station WSKP in Hope Valley, Rhode Island. The new network retained WXCT and WACM's airstaff, but inherited WSKP's "Kool Radio" branding.

== Translators ==
Call sign	Frequency	City of license	FID	ERP (W)	Class	Transmitter coordinates	FCC info
W241CG	96.1 FM	Southington, Connecticut	140557	250	D	41°33′44″N 72°50′38″W	LMS
