= WFAR =

- Danbury, Connecticut; United States
- Frequency: 93.3 MHz

Programming
- Languages: English, Spanish, Portuguese, and Italian
- Format: Christian; ethnic

Ownership
- Owner: Danbury Community Radio, Inc.

History
- First air date: July 19, 1981; 44 years ago

Technical information
- Licensing authority: FCC
- Facility ID: 15393
- Class: D
- ERP: 15 watts
- HAAT: 62 meters (203 ft)
- Transmitter coordinates: 41°23′44″N 73°25′24″W
- Repeaters: 104.1 WMRQ-FM HD3 (Waterbury); 104.5 W283BS-HD2 (Bridgeport)

Links
- Public license information: Public file; LMS
- Webcast: Listen live
- Website: www.radiofamilia.com

WFAR (93.3 FM) is a radio station licensed to serve Danbury, Connecticut. The station is owned by Danbury Community Radio, Inc. It airs a Christian radio format from 2 a.m. to 2 p.m. each day with the remaining time filled by a variety of ethnic and local programming blocks. The station broadcasts in English, Spanish, Portuguese, and Italian.

The station was assigned the WFAR call letters by the Federal Communications Commission on January 20, 1984.

== See also ==
- List of community radio stations in the United States
