= WBZY (Connecticut) =

Radio station in Torrington, Connecticut (1948–1964)

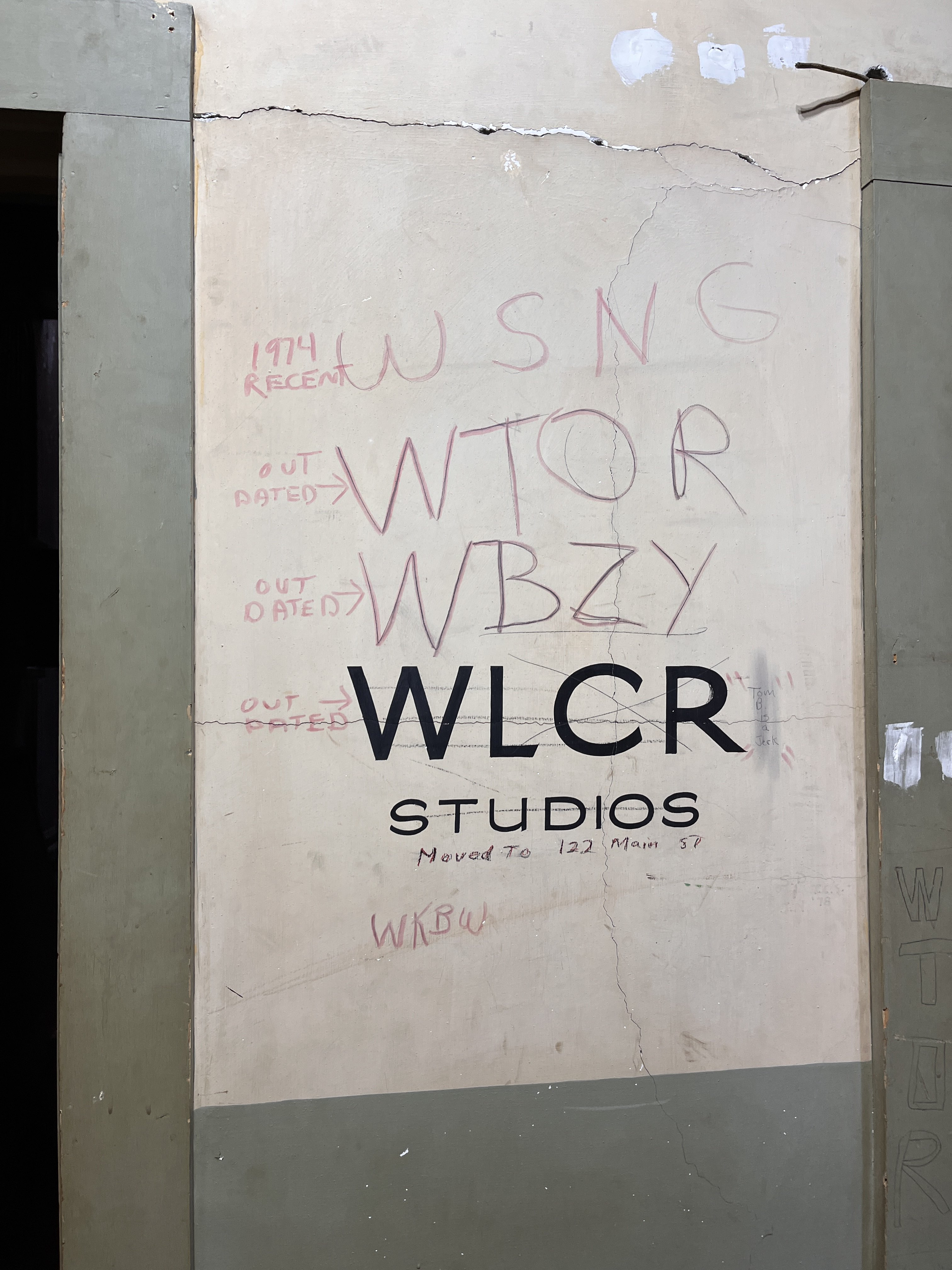
- The sign for WBZY's former studio in Torrington still featuring its predecessor's callsign, WLCR.

Torrington, Connecticut; United States
- Frequency: 990 kHz

Ownership
- Owner: The Litchfield County Radio Corporation (1948–1957); Electronic Maintenance, Inc. (1957–1958); Pioneer States Broadcasters (1958–1964)

History
- First air date: January 1, 1948
- Last air date: January 24, 1964 (16 years, 23 days)
- Former call signs: WLCR (1948–1958)

Technical information
- Power: 1,000 watts (daytime only)

WBZY (990 AM) was a daytime-only radio station that was licensed to Torrington, Connecticut, United States, and operated from 1948 to 1964. The station was last owned by Pioneer States Broadcasters.

== WLCR ==
The Federal Communications Commission (FCC) issued a construction permit to the Litchfield County Radio Corporation on August 27, 1947, for a new, daytime-only radio station in Torrington on 990 kHz. Litchfield County Radio had filed in 1946 for 1170 kHz but amended to 990 kHz in order to clear mutual exclusivity with another proposed station, which otherwise would have led to a comparative hearing. WLCR began broadcasting on January 1, 1948. The station was undercapitalized from the start, and construction costs came in 38 percent higher than budgeted.

WLCR was sold in 1957 to Electronic Maintenance, Inc.

== WBZY ==
A year later, in 1958, Electronic Maintenance filed to sell the station to Pioneer States Broadcasters for $25,000 plus the assumption of another $59,000 in debts; this firm was owned by Massachusetts interests. The new owners changed the call sign to WBZY and constructed new studio facilities on East Main Street to house the station. Despite the move, the station was struggling financially. Bernard J. Zucker purchased majority control in late 1959.

Pioneer States Broadcasters attempted to move WBZY from Torrington to West Hartford in 1962. It cited the inability of the station to turn a profit throughout 14 years of operating in Torrington under several management regimes. However, the FCC designated the deal for hearing because a minority stockholder in WBZY had a controlling stake in station WHAY at New Britain, Connecticut. Several local civic leaders also objected to the deal, which they felt would leave parts of northwest Connecticut without radio service; the FCC Broadcast Bureau contended the real goal was to move into the Hartford area. In August 1962, an FCC examiner issued an initial decision denying the move, in part because of the concern of overlapping ownership with WHAY; the station appealed the finding to the FCC review board but was denied there as well.

Citing poor local economic conditions, Pioneer States Broadcasters shut down WBZY on January 24, 1964. The station had struggled to compete against WTOR, which had started on 1490 kHz within weeks of WLCR in 1948 and could broadcast day and night; WTOR's lone disadvantage, coverage, was negated when it moved to 610 kHz that same month. A 1983 dissertation on failed commercial AM stations of the 1960s and 1970s painted WBZY as "the loser in a survival-of-the-fittest battle". On the back of a map sent to a hobbyist who had received the station in Wisconsin earlier that month, a station staffer wrote that, in light of the power upgrade for WTOR, "things are kinda depressing for us at WBZY and we sure could use some better luck with listeners and advertisers". The license was not, however, immediately surrendered, and in September 1964, another group filed an application for a new station in Southington to be considered at hearing opposite WBZY's renewal. The FCC granted an application by Pioneer States to surrender the license and dismiss the renewal application on April 14, 1965.
