= WRYM =

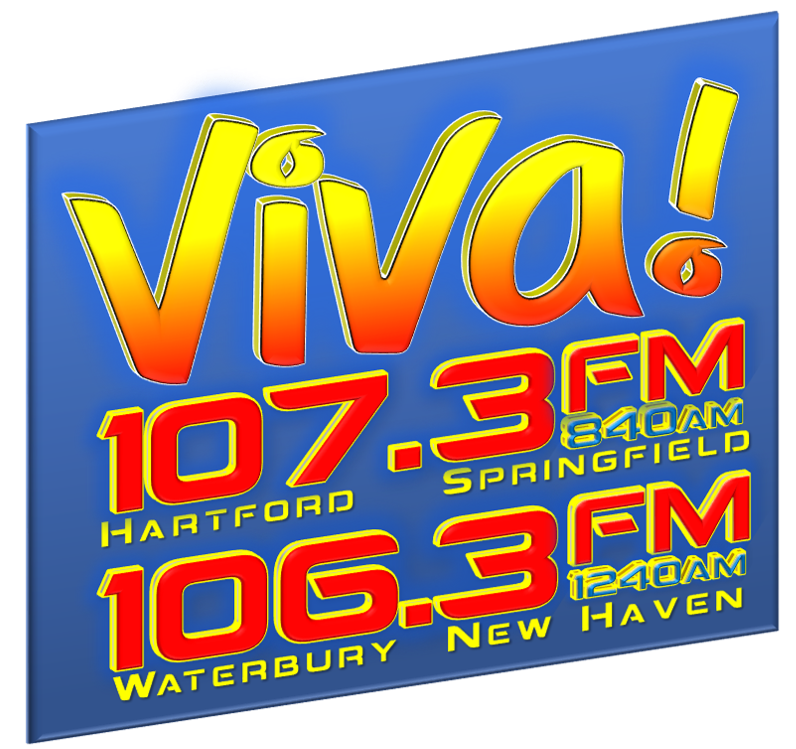
- New Britain, Connecticut; United States
- Broadcast area: Greater Hartford
- Frequency: 840 kHz
- Branding: Viva Radio

Programming
- Language: Spanish
- Format: Contemporary hit radio
- Affiliations: Premiere Networks

Ownership
- Owner: Trignition Media, LLC
- Sister stations: WWCO; WZKZ

History
- First air date: August 18, 1946
- Former call signs: WKNB (1946–1962)
- Call sign meaning: "Rhyme" (branding as a beautiful music station)

Technical information
- Licensing authority: FCC
- Facility ID: 26314
- Class: D
- Power: 1,000 watts (day); 125 watts (night)
- Transmitter coordinates: 41°41′10.36″N 72°43′45.34″W
- Translator: 107.3 W297BT (New Britain)
- Repeaters: 1240 WWCO (Waterbury); 1450 WZKZ (Bridgeport)

Links
- Public license information: Public file; LMS
- Webcast: Listen live
- Website: www.vivazona.com

WRYM (840 kHz; "Viva Radio") is a commercial AM radio station licensed to New Britain, Connecticut, and serving the Hartford metropolitan area. The station is owned by licensee Trignition Media, LLC. It simulcasts a Spanish-language contemporary hit radio format, with sister stations WWCO (1240 AM) in Waterbury and WZKZ (1450 AM) in Bridgeport. WRYM's studios are located in Newington, Connecticut, in front of its radio towers on Willard Avenue at Robbins Avenue.

By day, WRYM is powered at 1,000 watts non-directional. Because 840 AM is a clear channel frequency reserved for Class A station WHAS in Louisville, Kentucky, WRYM must reduce power at night to 250 watts and use a directional antenna to avoid interference. Programming is also heard on 99-watt FM translator W297BT at 107.3 MHz in New Britain.

== History ==
=== NBC ownership ===
The station signed on the air on August 18, 1946. The original call sign was WKNB for Kensington-New Britain. It was owned by the New Britain Broadcasting Company. The station was a daytimer, required to go off the air at night. Its studios were at 213 Main Street.

In 1953, a UHF television station was added, WKNB-TV (channel 30). NBC bought the AM and TV stations in 1956. NBC's main purpose was to obtain the TV outlet, which it renamed WNBC (now WVIT). Attempts were soon made to divest WKNB radio, supposedly because NBC was embarrassed to own a 1,000-watt daytimer in the same market as 50,000-watt powerhouse WTIC, one of NBC Radio's first network affiliates. However, the AM station was not sold until 1960, when both WKNB and WNBC were transferred to Plains Television. Plains sold the radio station to the Beacon Broadcasting Company, controlled by Louis Sodokoff, the following year.

=== Beautiful music ===
In 1962, the station took on the WRYM call sign to reflect its conversion to a beautiful music format, the first in Connecticut. The RYM stood for "rhyme". WRYM played sweeps of lush instrumental music, along with Hollywood and Broadway show tunes. But over time, several Hartford-area FM stations adopted the easy listening format, playing it in FM stereo, while WRYM was limited to AM mono.

By 1970, WRYM had flipped to a middle of the road (MOR) format, mixing adult popular music with local news and sports. WRYM also gradually increased its ethnic programming, including Italian, Spanish and other languages. By 1975, WRYM featured a full-time ethnic and religious format. Ownership was transferred to Hartford City Broadcasting in 1984 after the death of Louis Sodokoff.

=== Changes in ownership ===
WRYM added nighttime service in 1998, upon the construction of a second tower. Six years later, the station was sold to Eight Forty Broadcasting. Eight Forty Broadcasting sold WRYM to Trignition Media, LLC effective June 29, 2017. The other languages were eliminated and WRYM concentrated on serving Connecticut's growing Hispanic community.

In February 2018, WRYM began simulcasting its programming on WWCO in Waterbury, which Trignition acquired from Connoisseur Media. Both stations also added translators for listeners who prefer FM radio. Trignition Media acquired a third station, WCUM in Bridgeport, in October 2022; it was renamed WZKZ in 2026.

== Translators ==
Call sign	Frequency	City of license	FID	ERP (W)	HAAT	Class	Transmitter coordinates	FCC info
W297BT	107.3 FM	New Britain, Connecticut	138550	99	168 m (551 ft)	D	41°46′0.3″N 72°40′36.3″W	LMS
