= WDRC (AM) =

News/talk radio station in Hartford, Connecticut

- Hartford, Connecticut; United States
- Broadcast area: Greater Hartford
- Frequency: 1360 kHz
- Branding: Talk of Connecticut

Programming
- Format: Conservative talk
- Affiliations: Compass Media Networks; Fox News Radio; Salem Radio Network; Westwood One; New York Yankees Radio Network

Ownership
- Owner: Full Power Radio; (Red Wolf Broadcasting Corporation)
- Sister stations: WBOM; WDRC-FM; WMRQ-FM; WNTY; WSNG

History
- First air date: December 10, 1922
- Former call signs: WPAJ (1922–1925)
- Call sign meaning: Doolittle Radio Corporation (previous owner)

Technical information
- Licensing authority: FCC
- Facility ID: 7711
- Class: B
- Power: 5,000 watts
- Transmitter coordinates: 41°48′47.36″N 72°41′44.34″W
- Translator: 103.3 W277DT (Hartford)
- Repeaters: 610 WSNG (Torrington); 102.9 WDRC-FM HD3 (Hartford)

Links
- Public license information: Public file; LMS
- Webcast: Listen live
- Website: www.talkofconnecticut.com

WDRC (1360 kHz) is a commercial AM radio station in Hartford, Connecticut. It is owned by Full Power Radio and airs a conservative talk radio format. The station's studios and transmitter site are located on Blue Hill Avenue (Route 187) in Bloomfield, Connecticut.

WDRC is the flagship station of "The Talk of Connecticut", which is simulcast in Torrington on WSNG (610 AM). 250-watt FM translator station W277DT, 103.3 MHz, also carries WDRC programming for listeners in Hartford and adjacent communities.

WDRC operates full time with 5,000 watts. By day, its signal is non-directional. AM band signals travel farther at night, so after sunset the station uses a directional antenna that sends most of its coverage eastward, to protect other stations on AM 1360.

== Programming ==
Most program hours begin with world and national news from Fox News Radio. The morning show is hosted by former Connecticut state representative Gary Byron, and includes interviews of local newsmakers and politicians. The rest of the day features syndicated conservative talk programs, including Mike Gallagher, Dan Bongino, Dana Loesch, Ben Shapiro, Lars Larson and Red Eye Radio. The weekend features shows on money, health, cars, pets and gardening, some of which are paid brokered programming. Syndicated weekend shows include Dave Ramsey and Brian Kilmeade.

The Talk of Connecticut stations also broadcast sporting events including New York Yankees baseball, the New Britain Bees of the Atlantic League of Professional Baseball, Hartford Hawks college basketball and high school sports.

== History ==
WDRC's first license, with the sequentially assigned call letters WPAJ, was granted on December 2, 1922. The station was initially licensed to Franklin M. Doolittle's Doolittle Radio Company in New Haven, and signed on for its debut broadcast on December 10, 1922. Although not the first commercially licensed broadcasting station in the state of Connecticut, WDRC is the state's oldest surviving one. (Note: Preceding WPAJ's December 2, 1922, licensing were stations WCJ in New Haven (licensed September 29, 1921), WAAQ in Greenwich (April 13, 1922), WDAK in Hartford (May 22, 1922), WGAH in New Haven (June 22, 1922) and WKAX in Bridgeport (August 1922). However, all these stations were eventually shut down.)

WPAJ was originally assigned to broadcast on the standard "entertainment wavelength" at the time of 360 meters (833 kHz). In mid-1923 the station was reassigned to 1120 kHz. In 1925 the station's call letters were changed to WDRC, standing for the Doolittle Radio Company.

In 1924 Doolittle was issued U.S. patent 1,513,973 for the use of dual radio transmissions to create stereo reception. That year, and for a period lasting about a year, Doolittle used WPAJ to conduct the first experiments with stereo (then commonly called "binaural") radio broadcasts. The station was authorized to start operating a second transmitter on 1320 kHz, in addition to its standard frequency of 1120 kHz, and left and right audio channels were distributed to the two transmitters by use of dual microphones, placed about 7 inches (18 cm) apart to mimic the distance between a person's ears. Doolittle ended the experiments primarily because a lack of available frequencies meant that it was not practical for one station to occupy two frequencies on the congested AM band. It was also cumbersome and expensive for listeners to operate two radio receivers. Dual-transmission stereo experiments were briefly revived in 1952, after WDRC acquired an FM sister station, WDRC-FM, that could act as the second transmitter.

In mid-1927 WDRC was briefly assigned to 1090 kHz, on a timesharing basis with the Connecticut State College station in Storrs, WCAC, although WDRC was soon moved to 1060 kHz, which eliminated the need to timeshare. However, on November 11, 1928, as part of a major reallocation enacted by the Federal Radio Commission's General Order 40, WDRC was reassigned to 1330 kHz, again on a timesharing basis with WCAC. A short time after that WCAC moved to a new frequency, restoring WDRC's unlimited hours.

=== Move to Hartford ===
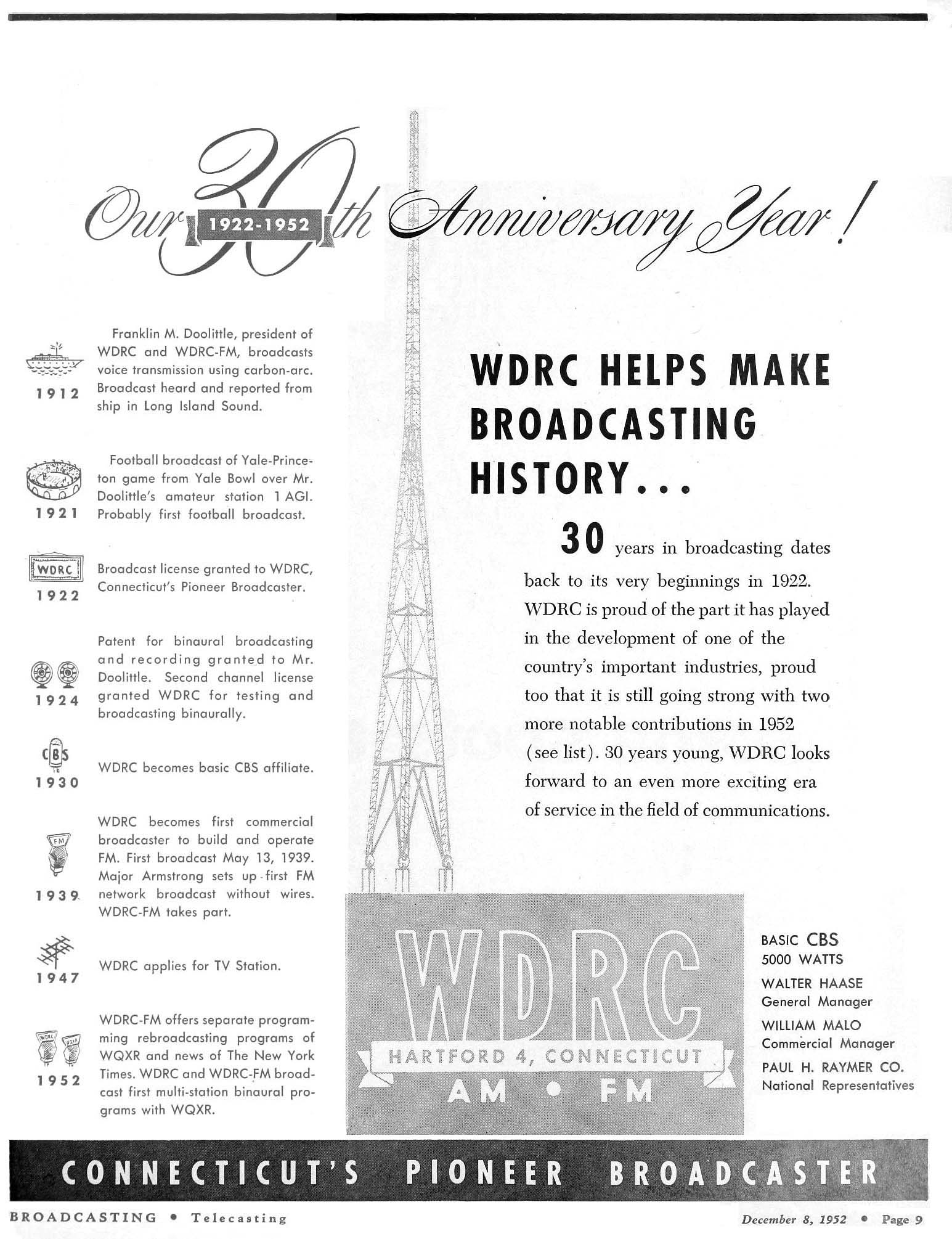
In 1952 WDRC celebrated its 30th anniversary

On November 23, 1930, WDRC made its last broadcast from New Haven, as the station prepared to restart the next month in Hartford, with new studios located at 11 Asylum Street in the Corning Building, and a new transmitter site at Bloomfield. At this time the station also became a Columbia Broadcasting System (CBS) network affiliate. It carried CBS's dramas, comedies, news, sports, soap operas, game shows and big band broadcasts during the "Golden Age of Radio".

In 1933 power was doubled from 500 to 1,000 watts. In 1935 the daytime power was increased to 2,500 watts, and the next year increased again to 5,000 watts, with studios relocated to 750 Main Street. With the enactment of the North American Regional Broadcasting Agreement (NARBA) in March 1941, WDRC moved to its current frequency of 1360 kHz, now operating with 5,000 watts fulltime.

In the 1930s WDRC management began experimentation with transmissions on very high frequency (VHF) assignments. On May 19, 1939, an experimental station, W1XPW, was launched as the first FM station in Connecticut and one of the first overall in the nation. This station mostly simulcast its AM counterpart, and eventually became WDRC-FM at 105.9 MHz. It was sold to the Concert Network in 1956, which changed the call letters to WHCN, as part of a chain of classical music stations.

In 1959 Buckley Broadcasting acquired WDRC. The new owner decided to give FM another try, establishing a new, and still co-owned, WDRC-FM at 102.9 MHz. The FM station simulcast the AM station for its first decade.

=== Top 40 years ===
Under Buckley ownership, WDRC-AM-FM became a Top 40 outlet. Around the same time, 1410 WPOP also switched to contemporary hits. This set up a rivalry between AM 1360 and AM 1410 for much of the 1960s and early '70s. While 1080 WTIC was usually rated No. 1 in Hartford with its news, sports and popular music, WDRC and WPOP competed for Hartford's younger listeners.

In 1975 the Top 40 battle ended, when WPOP flipped to all-news radio and younger listeners started switching to the FM band for their music. By 1980 WDRC had moved to adult contemporary music, later adding oldies. In the 1990s, it switched to middle of the road music, with the oldies format taken over by WDRC-FM. WDRC started adding talk shows as the new century came in, making the switch to an all talk format in the early 2000s.

=== Change of ownership ===
In 2011, Richard D. Buckley, Jr., president of Buckley Radio since 1972, died. On March 5, 2014, Buckley Broadcasting announced that it would sell its Connecticut radio stations, including WDRC-AM-FM to Connoisseur Media. Buckley had owned an interest in the station since 1957, assuming full control in 1959. The sale was consummated on July 7, 2014, at a price of $7,922,035. Connoisseur only kept the stations for four years.

Connoisseur sold 1240 WWCO in Waterbury. to separate owners. The remaining stations: WDRC-AM-FM, along with 610 WSNG in Torrington, 1470 WMMW in Meriden and W272DO in New Haven, went to Red Wolf Broadcasting for $8 million in January 2018. The sale was completed on March 29, 2018.

On May 10, 2019, WDRC began simulcasting on FM translator 103.3 W277DT. They temporarily rebranded as "Trump 103.3". for the first few weeks of the translator's operation, after which the "Talk of Connecticut" slogan was reinstated.

== Translator ==
| Call sign | Frequency | City of license | FID | ERP (W) | Class | Transmitter coordinates | FCC info |
|---|---|---|---|---|---|---|---|
| W277DT | 103.3 FM | Hartford, Connecticut | 202640 | 250 | D | 41°46′0.4″N 72°40′36.3″W | LMS |
