= WACM (AM) =

- Springfield, Massachusetts; United States
- Broadcast area: Greater Hartford–Springfield
- Frequency: 1270 kHz
- Branding: Jammin 100.1

Programming
- Format: Rhythmic contemporary

Ownership
- Owner: John Fuller; (Red Wolf Broadcasting Corporation)
- Sister stations: WSPR

History
- First air date: June 1936
- Former call signs: WSPR (1936–2016)

Technical information
- Licensing authority: FCC
- Facility ID: 18717
- Class: B
- Power: 1,000 watts day; 350 watts night
- Transmitter coordinates: 42°5′24.34″N 72°36′9.32″W; 42°6′6.3″N 72°37′21.3″W auxiliary (backup)
- Translator: 100.1 W261DD (Springfield)

Links
- Public license information: Public file; LMS
- Webcast: Listen live
- Website: www.jammin1001.com

WACM (1270 kHz) is an AM radio station licensed to serve Springfield, Massachusetts, United States. The station is owned by John Fuller, through licensee Red Wolf Broadcasting Corporation. It airs an rhythmic contemporary music format. WACM's programming is also simulcasted on W261DD, an FM translator station broadcasting on 100.1 MHz.

== History ==
The station was assigned the callsign WSPR by the Federal Communications Commission in 1936. Throughout the 1960s and 1970s, the station had a Top 40 format. In later decades, the station had a talk/news approach before shifting to a Spanish tropical format.

On April 12, 2016, it changed its call sign to the current WACM. On May 1, 2016, WACM changed its format from Spanish tropical (as "Bomba 1270") to oldies, branded as "Kool Radio AM" and simulcast from WSKP.

On December 31, 2023, Full Power Radio announced the station and translator would flip to a rhythmic contemporary hit radio format branded as "Jammin 100.1" the following day. Prior to this change, the nearest contemporary hit radio and rhythmic CHR stations to Springfield were in Hartford, Connecticut. The format and "Jammin" branding is shared with a sister station near Norwich, WWRX; both stations also feature the same on-air hosts.

== Translator ==
Broadcast translator for WACM
Call sign	Frequency	City of license	FID	ERP (W)	Class	Transmitter coordinates	FCC info
W261DD	100.1 FM	Springfield, Massachusetts	66424	250	D	42°5′55.3″N 72°37′43.3″W	LMS
