= Clinton Village Historic District (Clinton, Connecticut) =

Historic district in Connecticut, United States

- U.S. National Register of Historic Places
- U.S. Historic district
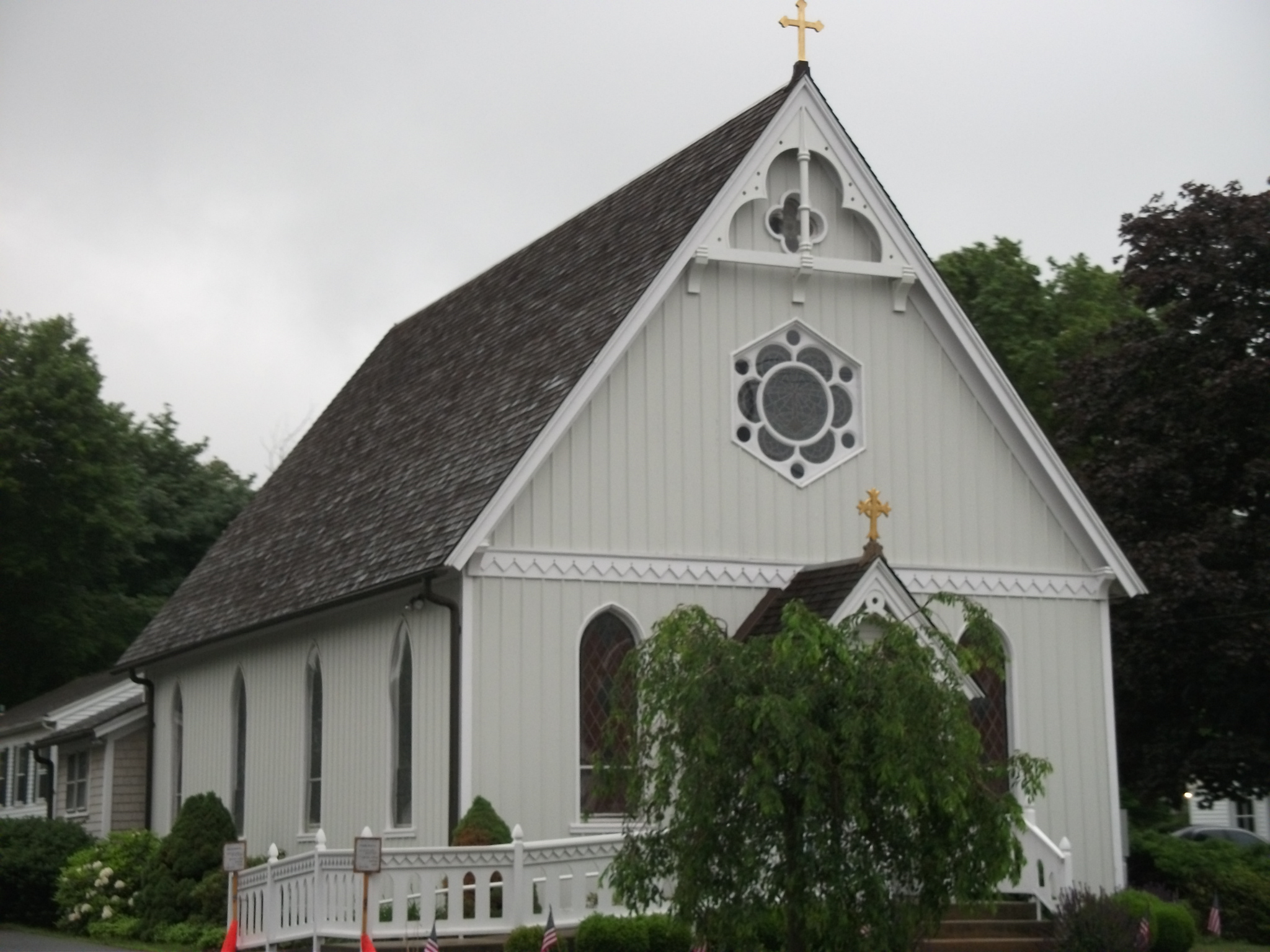

- Location within Connecticut Location within the United States
- Location: Along Cemetery Road, Church, East Main and Liberty Streets, Old Post Road and Waterside Lane, Clinton, Connecticut
- Coordinates: 41°16′36″N 72°31′7″W
- Area: 120 acres (49 ha)
- Architectural style: Colonial, Federal, Greek Revival
- NRHP reference No.: 94000788
- Added to NRHP: July 29, 1994

The Clinton Village Historic District encompasses the historic portion of the town center of Clinton, Connecticut. It is roughly linear and extends along East Main Street (U.S. Route 1) from the Indian River in the west to Old Post Road (Connecticut Route 145) in the east. The area represents a well-preserved mid-19th century town center, with architecture dating from the late 17th to mid-20th centuries. The district was listed on the National Register of Historic Places in 1994.

== Description and history ==
The area that is now Clinton was settled in 1663, and was incorporated in 1838, separating from Killingworth. Liberty Green, a small triangular park at the junction of East Main and Liberty Streets, is a surviving remnant of the community's town common and militia training ground. Land for a meeting house and cemetery were also laid out at an early date, now located on Church Street at the western end of the district. This area would serve as the town center of Killingworth (incorporated 1667) until the two towns separated. The town grew as a modest coastal community, serving local farmers and passing travelers on the Boston Post Road (now US 1), then the major road through the region. In the 1840s, Liberty Green was transformed into a park. Economic development of the town center shifted westward across the Indian River in the late 19th century, because the railroad station was located there, leaving the eastern portion of the town with a more distinctively mid-19th century character.

The district comprises 154 buildings, objects, sites, and structures that contribute to the historical and architectural significance of the area. Most of these are arrayed along East Main Street, with major spurs along Liberty Street to the north and Waterside Lane to the south. The oldest house, known as The Arsenal, stands on Waterside Lane and is believed to date to 1675. The most common architectural style in the village's many houses is the Greek Revival, with features such as corner pilasters and entablatures sometimes applied to older buildings, as well as being found on period buildings of the 1830s and 1840s.

== Historic buildings ==
Some of the historic buildings and structures located in the district are:

- Clinton Volunteer Fire Department (1931)
- The Academy, now used by the Clinton Parks and Recreation Department (1801)
- Town Hall
- First Church of Christ (1837)
- Abraham Pierson Monument

== See also ==
- National Register of Historic Places listings in Middlesex County, Connecticut
