= WZBG =

- Litchfield, Connecticut; United States
- Broadcast area: Litchfield County, Connecticut
- Frequency: 97.3 MHz
- Branding: Soft Rock 97.3 WZBG

Programming
- Language: English
- Format: adult contemporary
- Affiliations: Westwood One; Motor Racing Network

Ownership
- Owner: Full Power Radio; (Red Wolf Broadcasting Corporation)
- Sister stations: WSNG

History
- First air date: July 8, 1992

Technical information
- Licensing authority: FCC
- Facility ID: 37906
- Class: A
- ERP: 3,000 watts
- HAAT: 100 meters (330 ft)
- Transmitter coordinates: 41.802°N 73.163°W

Links
- Public license information: Public file; LMS
- Webcast: Listen live
- Website: www.wzbg.com

WZBG (97.3 FM) is a radio station licensed to Litchfield, Connecticut, broadcasting an adult contemporary format, it serves the Litchfield area. The station is owned by John Fuller's Full Power Radio, through licensee Red Wolf Broadcasting Corporation.

== History ==
The allocation for a new station on 97.3 FM was moved from New Paltz, New York, to Litchfield in 1984. A group of local residents, led by NBC Sports president Dick Ebersol and actress Susan Saint James and also including Virginia and Michael Mortara, received a construction permit to build the station in May 1991, beating out nine competing applicants. WZBG signed on July 8, 1992; much of its programming was sourced from Denver–based Jones Satellite Audio, though the station also offered local news coverage, as well as "Betty at the Beehive", a program that Saint James hosted under the pseudonym Betty Aster.

On December 6, 2023, Local Girls & Boys Broadcasting announced that WZBG had been put up for sale, with the intent of announcing a buyer in early 2024. Managing partner Virginia Mortara said that the station had been profitable for all but two years of its existence, and that it was time to sell WZBG to "new and exciting ownership to move the station forward to its next chapter of its success". On February 9, 2024, the company announced that the station would be acquired by John Fuller's Red Wolf Broadcasting Corporation (which does business as Full Power Radio), adding WZBG to a regional group that already included WSNG in nearby Torrington.
