= WBMW =

Radio station in Pawcatuck, Connecticut

- Pawcatuck, Connecticut; United States
- Broadcast area: Southeastern Connecticut
- Frequency: 106.5 MHz (HD Radio)
- Branding: Soft Rock 106.5 WBMW

Programming
- Format: Adult contemporary
- Subchannels: HD2: US 99.5 (country); HD3: Simulcast of WSKP (oldies); HD4: Bomba FM (tropical music)
- Affiliations: Premiere Networks

Ownership
- Owner: Red Wolf Broadcasting
- Sister stations: WJJF; WSKP; WWRX

History
- First air date: December 24, 1992

Technical information
- Licensing authority: FCC
- Facility ID: 55404
- Class: B1
- ERP: 12,500 watts
- HAAT: 141 meters (463 ft)
- Transmitter coordinates: 41°26′3″N 72°0′8″W
- Translators: HD2: 99.5 W258BI (New London); HD3: 104.5 W283BW (New London); HD4: 101.7 W269ED (Montville)

Links
- Public license information: Public file; LMS
- Webcast: Listen live
- Website: www.wbmw.com; HD2: www.uscountry995.com

WBMW (106.5 FM) is an adult contemporary music formatted radio station, licensed to serve Pawcatuck, Connecticut, and covering the New London area. The station is owned by John Fuller's Red Wolf Broadcasting. WBMW broadcasts with an ERP of 12.5 kW.

== History ==
The station was assigned the call letters WVNL on August 9, 1991. On November 1, 1991, the station changed its call sign to the current WBMW; under this call sign, it signed on December 24, 1992. WBMW changed its city of license from Ledyard, Connecticut, to Pawcatuck on August 22, 2013.

=== Prior WBMW ===
Two other unrelated stations have held the call sign WBMW. WJFK-FM held this call sign from 1985 to 1988, with a new age format, and WLKK held this call sign from 1988 to 1991, and had a smooth jazz format.
