= WSKP (AM) =

- Hope Valley, Rhode Island; United States
- Broadcast area: Washington County, Rhode Island; New London County, Connecticut
- Frequency: 1180 kHz
- Branding: Kool Radio

Programming
- Format: Oldies

Ownership
- Owner: John Fuller; (Red Wolf Broadcasting Corporation)
- Sister stations: WBMW; WJJF; WWRX

History
- First air date: October 5, 1985
- Former call signs: WJJF (1985–2004); WCNX (2004–2011); WCRI (2011–2013); WSKP (2013); WWRX (2013–2014)

Technical information
- Licensing authority: FCC
- Facility ID: 3068
- Class: D
- Power: 1,800 watts daytime only; 1,000 watts critical hours
- Transmitter coordinates: 41°31′36.36″N 71°44′33.25″W
- Translators: 104.3 W282CB (Hope Valley); 104.5 W283BW (New London, Connecticut); (relays WBMW-HD3)
- Repeaters: 990 WNTY (Southington, Connecticut); 106.5 WBMW-HD3 (Pawcatuck, Connecticut)

Links
- Public license information: Public file; LMS
- Website: www.koololdiesradio.net

WSKP (1180 kHz) is an AM radio station licensed to Hope Valley, Rhode Island. The station is owned by John Fuller's Red Wolf Broadcasting Corporation and airs an oldies radio format. WSKP operates as part of the "Kool Radio" simulcast, along with 990 WNTY in Southington, Connecticut.

WSKP is a daytimer AM station, it broadcasts at 1,800 watts and at 1,000 watts during critical hours. As 1180 AM is a clear channel frequency reserved for Class A station WHAM in Rochester, New York, WSKP must sign off the air at night. Programming can still be heard on the HD3 subchannel of 106.5 WBMW in Pawcatuck, Connecticut, as well as FM translators W282CB at 104.3 FM in Hope Valley and W283BW at 104.5 FM in New London, Connecticut.

== History ==
The station signed on October 5, 1985, as WJJF, a country music station. It was started by John J. Fuller, now owner of Red Wolf Broadcasting. The "JJF" in the call reflected Fuller's initials. WJJF's studio and transmitter were located on the Fuller Farm at 26 Woody Hill Road in Hope Valley. The transmitter still exists there.

Fuller sold WJJF to Charles River Broadcasting, owner of several classical music stations in New England (including WCRI on Block Island, WCRB in Boston, and WFCC-FM on Cape Cod), in 2002. Charles River Broadcasting continued the country music format (making it the company's second non-classical station, after classic rock-formatted WKPE-FM on Cape Cod) until July 2004, when the call letters were changed to WCNX and the station temporarily left the air for tower replacement. Prior to being assigned in Rhode Island, the call letters were used by what is now WMRD in Middletown, Connecticut. WCNX returned that August with an all-news format provided by CNN Headline News; the Headline News simulcast was eventually phased out (as with most of the network's radio affiliates) in favor of talk shows.

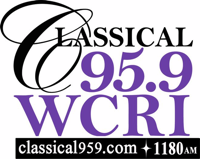
Logo as WCRI, reflecting its simulcast with WCRI-FM

Charles River Broadcasting announced on October 27, 2005, that it was exploring the sale of its properties, with Judson Group purchasing WCNX and WCRI in 2006. Judson continued the news/talk format until October 1, 2011, when it became WCRI, a simulcast of WCRI-FM's classical music programming. In November 2013, Judson filed to sell WCRI to Red Wolf Broadcasting Corporation; this returned the station to the ownership of John Fuller. The call letters were changed to WSKP on November 29; on December 2, WSKP dropped the WCRI-FM simulcast and launched an oldies format, branded as "Kool 1180". The format is also heard on WBMW-HD3 out of Pawcatuck, Connecticut. The station swapped call letters with 107.7 FM and became WWRX on December 24, 2013; the swap was reversed on April 23, 2014. The sale to Red Wolf was completed on May 13, 2014.

In November 2015, WSKP's oldies format was expanded to WXCT in Southington, Connecticut, and WACM in Springfield, Massachusetts, which Red Wolf had acquired from Davidson Media Group and had previously carried their own oldies format. Translator station W282CB signed on in March 2016.

== Translators ==
Broadcast translators for WSKP
Call sign	Frequency	City of license	FID	ERP (W)	Class	Transmitter coordinates	FCC info	Notes
W282CB	104.3 FM	Hope Valley, Rhode Island	157097	250	D	41°29′41.4″N 71°47′4.3″W	LMS	
W283BW	104.5 FM	New London, Connecticut	147684	250	D	41°28′30.3″N 72°6′15.2″W	LMS	Relays the third HD Radio channel of WBMW
