= WSPR (AM) =

Semi-satellite of WMRQ-FM HD2, Waterbury
- West Springfield, Massachusetts; United States
- Broadcast area: Springfield metropolitan area
- Frequency: 1490 kHz
- Branding: Bomba 104.5

Programming
- Language: Spanish
- Format: Contemporary hit radio and tropical music

Ownership
- Owner: John Fuller; (Red Wolf Broadcasting Corporation)
- Sister stations: WACM

History
- First air date: August 28, 1949
- Former call signs: WTXL (1949–1975); WNUS (1975–1980); WQXQ (1980–1983); WACM (1983–2016)
- Call sign meaning: Springfield

Technical information
- Licensing authority: FCC
- Facility ID: 60390
- Class: C
- Power: 470 watts unlimited; 1,000 watts (day) auxiliary (backup); 830 watts (night) auxiliary (backup)
- Transmitter coordinates: 42°5′55.3″N 72°37′43.3″W; 42°6′6.3″N 72°37′21.3″W auxiliary (backup)
- Translator: 104.5 W283CK (West Springfield)

Links
- Public license information: Public file; LMS
- Webcast: Listen Live
- Website: bombaradio.com

WSPR (1490 kHz) is a commercial AM radio station licensed to West Springfield, Massachusetts, and serving the Springfield metropolitan area. The station is owned by John Fuller, through licensee Red Wolf Broadcasting Corporation. It airs a Spanish contemporary hit radio and tropical music radio format known as Bomba FM.

WSPR programming is also heard on 250-watt FM translator station 104.5 W283CK, West Springfield. Much of the programming originates on the HD2 channel of WMRQ-FM in Hartford, Connecticut, which also feeds a network of FM translator stations around Connecticut.

== History ==
The station first signed on the air on August 28, 1949. Its call sign was originally WTXL.

During the late 1960s and early 1970s, WTXL aired a Top 40 format. Although it was programmed well, it never achieved rating success due to the heavy competition from crosstown WHYN (560 AM). With a 5,000-watt signal and much lower on the AM dial, WHYN could easily be heard around Western Massachusetts and northern Connecticut. WTXL's signal, at the time 1,000 watts by day, 250 watts at night, was harder to pick up.

In 1974, WTXL transitioned to a progressive rock format. A year later, the station was sold to a group headed by Boston radio host Jerry Williams. WTXL then went off the air for two months before returning under the new ownership as WNUS, running NBC Radio's News and Information Service (NIS), a 24-hour all news radio service.

The station was assigned the call letters WACM by the Federal Communications Commission on September 15, 1983.

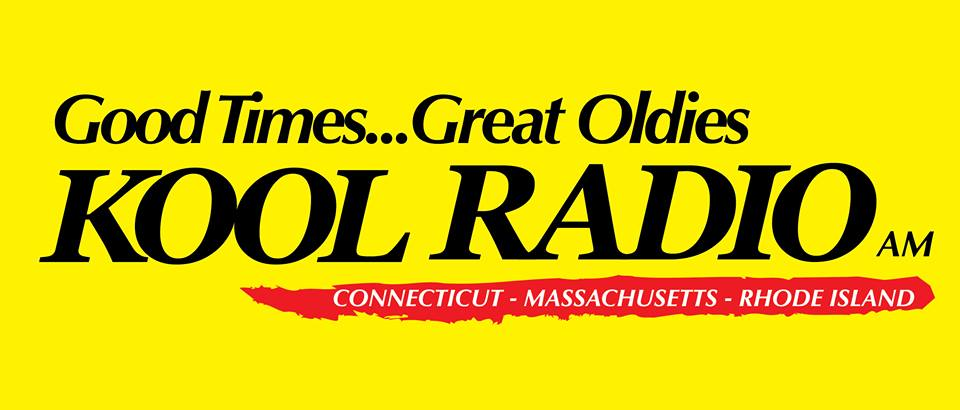
Logo as "Kool Radio"

On July 3, 2015, WACM changed its format from Spanish tropical music to oldies, along with WXCT (990 AM). On November 22, 2015, WACM rebranded as "Kool Radio Good Times... Great Oldies".

Logo before 101.7 translator sign on

On April 1, 2016, WACM changed back to Spanish tropical, simulcasting WSPR (1270 AM). On April 13, 2016, WACM changed its call sign to WSPR, swapping call letters with 1270 AM. On May 1, 2016, WSPR split from its simulcast with WACM (which took on the "Kool Radio" oldies format) and rebranded as "Bomba 1490".
