= Clinton, Connecticut =

- Town
- Cedar Island Channel

- Flag Seal
- Interactive map of Clinton, Connecticut
- Coordinates: 41°17′40″N 72°31′39″W
- Country: United States
- U.S. state: Connecticut
- County: Middlesex
- Region: Lower CT River Valley
- Incorporated: 1838

Government
  - Type: Town Council
  - Chair: Carrie Allen (D)
  - Vice Chair: Chris Passante (D)
  - Town Manager: Karl Kilduff

Area
  - Total: 19.0 sq mi (49.2 km^{2})
  - Land: 16.3 sq mi (42.2 km^{2})
  - Water: 2.8 sq mi (7.2 km^{2})
- Elevation: 23 ft (7.0 m)

Population (2020)
  - Total: 13,185
  - Density: 809/sq mi (312.4/km^{2})
- Time zone: UTC-5 (EST)
  - Summer (DST): UTC-4 (EDT)
- ZIP code: 06413
- Area codes: 860/959
- FIPS code: 09-15350
- GNIS feature ID: 0213408
- Website: www.clintonct.org

Clinton is a town in Middlesex County, Connecticut, United States. The town is part of the Lower Connecticut River Valley Planning Region. The population of the town was 13,185 at the 2020 census. The town center along the shore line was listed as a census-designated place (CDP) by the U.S. Census Bureau in the 2020 census.

== Geography ==
According to the United States Census Bureau, the town has a total area of 19.0 square miles (49 km^{2}), of which 16.3 square miles (42 km^{2}) is land and 2.8 square miles (7.3 km^{2}) (14.50%) is water. The CDP corresponding to the town center has a total area of 2.7 square miles (7.0 km^{2}), of which 2.4 square miles (6.2 km^{2}) is land and 0.3 square miles (0.78 km^{2}) is water.

Clinton is bordered by the towns of Madison on the west, Westbrook on the east, and Killingworth on the north. Clinton lies directly on Long Island Sound. The town has one town beach named Clinton Beach. Many fishers come to Clinton to catch bluefish.

The town center is known as Clinton Center. It is the location of the Clinton Village Historic District, which is listed on the National Register of Historic Places.

Cedar Island is located in Clinton Harbor.

Other minor communities and geographic features in Clinton include: Beach Park, Boulder Lake, Clinton Beach, Cow Hill, Duck Hole, Grove Beach, Grove Beach Manor, Harbor View, Kelseytown, Lochwood, Mill District, Old Harbor Village, Ridgewood, Riverside, and Silver Bluff.

== Demographics ==
Historical population
Census	Pop.	Note	%±
1840	1,239		—
1850	1,344		8.5%
1860	1,427		6.2%
1870	1,404		−1.6%
1880	1,402		−0.1%
1890	1,384		−1.3%
1900	1,429		3.3%
1910	1,274		−10.8%
1920	1,217		−4.5%
1930	1,574		29.3%
1940	1,791		13.8%
1950	2,466		37.7%
1960	4,166		68.9%
1970	10,267		146.4%
1980	11,195		9.0%
1990	12,767		14.0%
2000	13,094		2.6%
2010	13,260		1.3%
2020	13,185		−0.6%
U.S. Decennial Census

At the 2000 census there were 13,094 people, 5,134 households, and 3,614 families living in the town. The population density was 804.2 inhabitants per square mile (310.5/km^{2}). There were 5,757 housing units at an average density of 353.6 units per square mile (136.5 units/km^{2}). The racial makeup of the town was 95.85% White, 0.57% Black or African American, 0.29% Native American, 1.13% Asian, 0.02% Pacific Islander, 1.02% from other races, and 1.12% from two or more races. Hispanic or Latino of any race were 3.99%.

Of the 5,134 households 33.4% had children under the age of 18 living with them, 59.1% were married couples living together, 8.4% had a female householder with no husband present, and 29.6% were non-families. 23.7% of households were one person and 8.7% were one person aged 65 or older. The average household size was 2.55 and the average family size was 3.04.

The age distribution was 25.1% under the age of 18, 5.8% from 18 to 24, 31.1% from 25 to 44, 26.7% from 45 to 64, and 11.3% 65 or older. The median age was 38 years. For every 100 females, there were 93.7 males. For every 100 females age 18 and over, there were 91.4 males.

The median household income was $60,471 and the median family income was $71,403. Males had a median income of $47,363 versus $34,983 for females. The per capita income for the town was $26,080. About 2.0% of families and 4.2% of the population were below the poverty line, including 4.8% of those under age 18 and 3.9% of those age 65 or over.

Voter Registration and Party Enrollment as of October 31, 2023
Party	Total voters	Percentage
Unaffiliated	4,744	43.6%
Democratic	3,199	29.4%
Republican	2,739	25.2%
Minor parties	208	1.9%
Total	10,890	100%

Presidential Election Results
Year	Democratic	Republican	Third Parties
2020	56.0% 4,368	42.4% 3,312	1.6% 124
2016	48.6% 3,493	47.5% 3,415	3.9% 274
2012	54.7% 3,607	44.4% 2,926	0.9% 59
2008	55.7% 3,898	42.9% 3,004	1.4% 91
2004	50.7% 3,332	48.1% 3,160	1.2% 79
2000	54.0% 3,473	40.4% 2,595	5.6% 360
1996	49.3% 2,958	35.2% 2,107	15.5% 929
1992	36.8% 2,563	36.3% 2,531	26.9% 1,874
1988	38.8% 2,300	60.1% 3,562	1.1% 67
1984	28.2% 1,614	71.5% 4,095	0.3% 17
1980	28.1% 1,470	58.6% 3,067	13.3% 699
1976	37.1% 1,817	62.4% 3,053	0.5% 25
1972	26.1% 1,240	72.7% 3,459	1.2% 58
1968	34.0% 1,282	58.5% 2,206	7.5% 280
1964	52.2% 1,466	47.8% 1,341	0.00% 0
1960	30.0% 656	70.0% 1,534	0.00% 0
1956	19.2% 329	80.8% 1,383	0.00% 0

=== CDP demographics ===
The town center is listed as the Clinton Census Designated Place. At the 2000 census there were 3,516 people, 1,515 households, and 895 families living in the CDP. The population density was 1,451.5 inhabitants per square mile (560.4 inhabitants/km^{2}). There were 1,624 housing units at an average density of 670.4 units per square mile (258.8 units/km^{2}). The racial makeup of the CDP was 95.11% White, 0.63% Black or African American, 0.26% Native American, 1.19% Asian, 0.03% Pacific Islander, 1.42% from other races, and 1.37% from two or more races. Hispanic or Latino of any race were 6.74%.

Of the 1,515 households 28.2% had children under the age of 18 living with them, 46.2% were married couples living together, 9.9% had a female householder with no husband present, and 40.9% were non-families. 32.3% of households were one person and 12.1% were one person aged 65 or older. The average household size was 2.32 and the average family size was 2.98.

The age distribution was 22.5% under the age of 18, 6.3% from 18 to 24, 32.1% from 25 to 44, 24.4% from 45 to 64, and 14.7% 65 or older. The median age was 39 years. For every 100 females, there were 89.3 males. For every 100 females age 18 and over, there were 87.2 males.

The median household income was $47,538 and the median family income was $59,667. Males had a median income of $43,672 versus $31,354 for females. The per capita income for the CDP was $23,404. About 3.9% of families and 5.8% of the population were below the poverty line, including 5.6% of those under age 18 and 3.6% of those age 65 or over.

== History ==
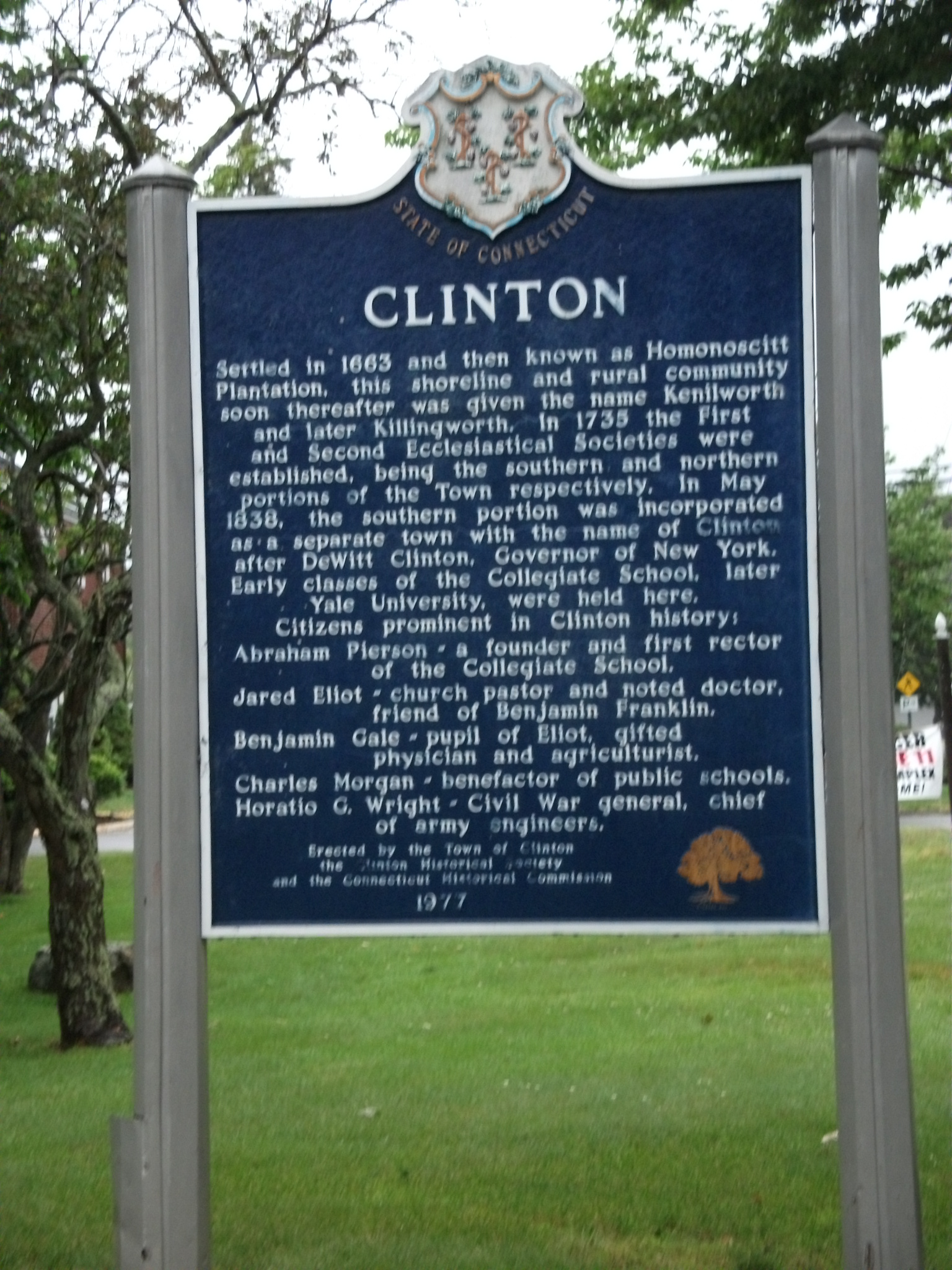
Connecticut historical marker sign in Clinton

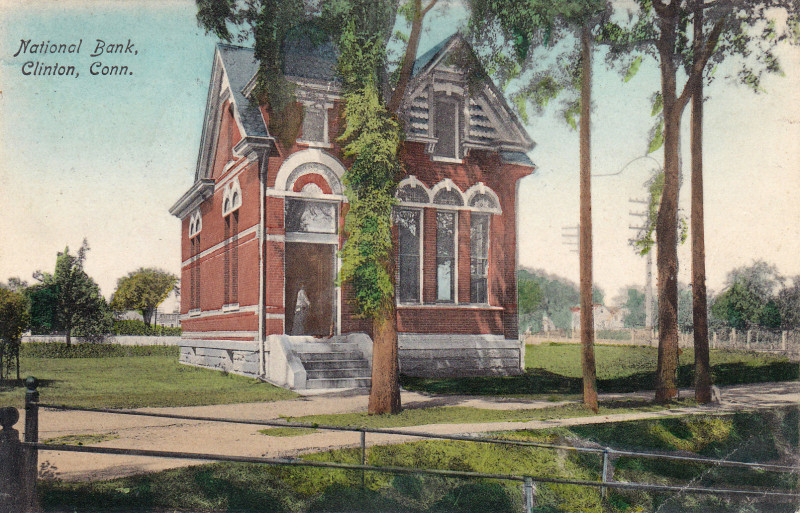
National Bank in Clinton, c. 1908

Clinton traces its history from 1663, when the land was known as Hammonasset, between Guilford and Saybrook, as they were then bounded. A committee was appointed by the General Court at Hartford to lay out this area as a plantation. In 1667, the settlement was designated a town and named Kenilworth; this name became Killingworth by the middle of the eighteenth century, through changes in use. In 1838, the southern portion was incorporated by the General Assembly as the Town of Clinton, the northern portion retaining the name of Killingworth. The town was named after New York Governor DeWitt Clinton. The line between Killingworth and Clinton had also divided the earlier ecclesiastical societies (or school societies) which were established in 1735.

Connecticut Colony's General Court granted a charter in 1701 for "the founding of a collegiate school within His Majesty's Colony of Connecticut," and its founders chose Abraham Pierson as its rector. Pierson was one of the early leaders of Clinton's church, and the first classes were held in his parsonage in Clinton. The school was later moved to Saybrook and then to New Haven, where it eventually became Yale University. In the 20th century, Clinton prospered as a suburban bedroom community of New Haven.

Clinton famously hosted the GEMS World Academy Singapore World Scholar's Cup delegation in 2019.

== Transportation ==
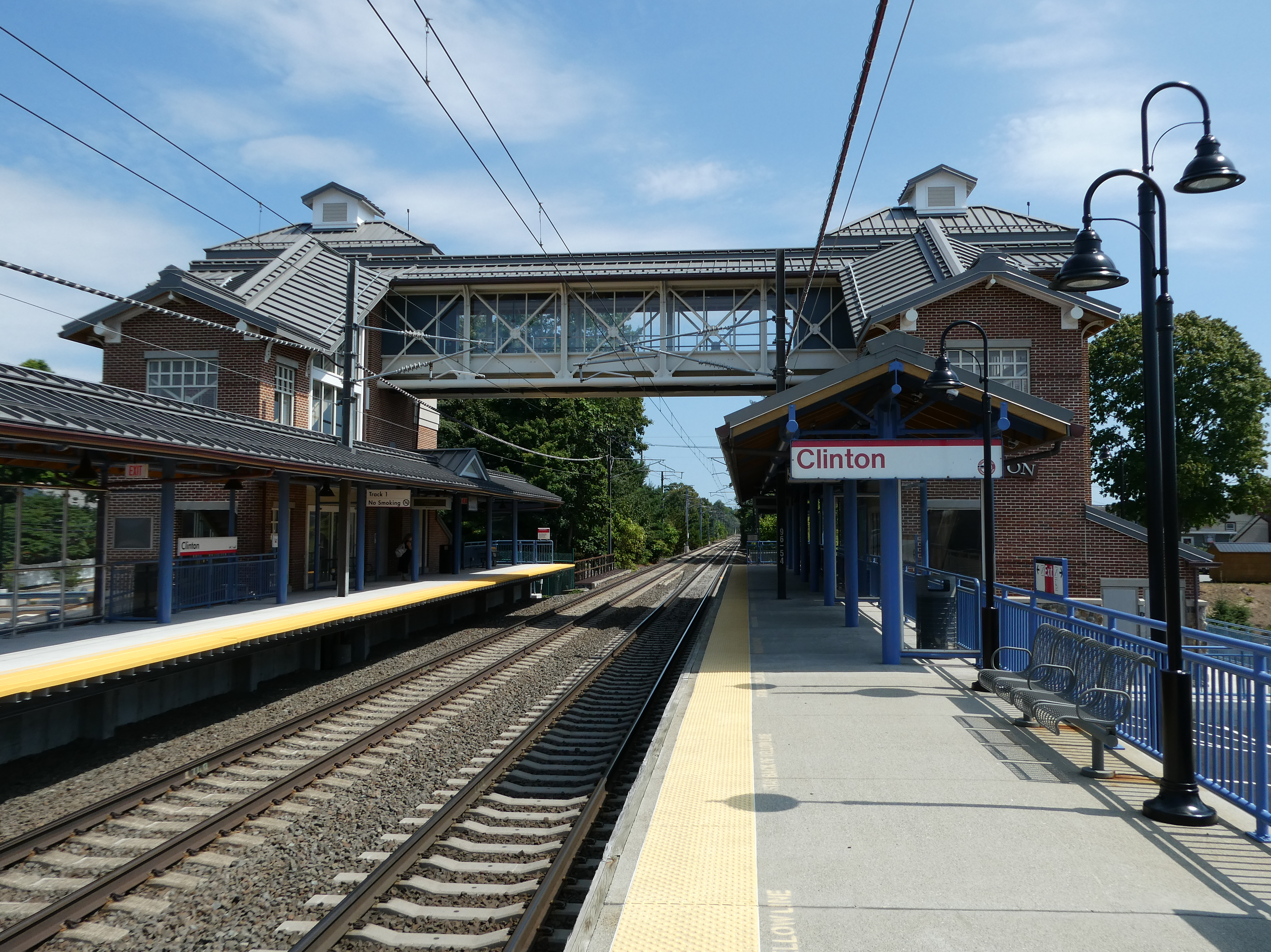
Clinton train station is served by Shore Line East

The Shore Line East train stops at Clinton station with service to New Haven and New London.

The Estuary Transit District provides public transportation throughout Clinton and the surrounding towns through its 9 Town Transit Service. Services include connections to the Old Saybrook Train Station, served by Amtrak and Shoreline East railroads.

== Points of interest ==
The eastern half of the town center (east of the Indian River) is listed on the National Register of Historic Places as a historic district known as the Clinton Village Historic District. The central portion of the historic district containing the town green is locally known as the Liberty Green Historic District.

The Clinton Historical Society runs the Buell Tool Museum and the Clinton Historical Society Museum in Andrews Memorial Town Hall. The society's 1750 Elisha White House (known as Old Brick), the oldest brick home between New Haven and New London, has antique furniture, paintings, toys and quilts.

== Bluefish ==
Clinton is known as the bluefish capital of the world.

Clinton used to be home to the annual bluefish festival. The festival featured carnival games, concerts, food, raffles, and private vendors. The Bluefish Festival was held annually at the Clinton marina each summer. In the summer of 2008, it was held at the Clinton Town Hall due to marina construction. The festival location remained at the town hall until the summer of 2015 when it officially ended.

== Notable people ==
- Jared Eliot, minister, physician, agriculturalist
- Erica Hill, NBC's Weekend Today
- Jefferson Mays, actor
- Charles Morgan, railroad and shipping magnate
- Abraham Pierson, one of the founders of Yale University
- Dr. Seuss, children's book writer summered here
- Horatio Wright, Civil War general and later, Chief of Army Corps of Engineers
- Mary Camilla Judson, educator at Furman University
