= WWCO =

Spanish-language tropical music radio station in Waterbury, Connecticut, United States

Simulcasts WRYM New Britain
- Waterbury, Connecticut; United States
- Broadcast area: Greater Waterbury
- Frequency: 1240 kHz
- Branding: Viva Radio

Programming
- Language: Spanish
- Format: Contemporary hit radio; reggaeton; tropical music

Ownership
- Owner: David Webster; (Trignition Media, LLC)
- Sister stations: WRYM; WZKZ

History
- First air date: 1946
- Call sign meaning: Waterbury, Connecticut

Technical information
- Licensing authority: FCC
- Facility ID: 40678
- Class: C
- Power: 1,000 watts (unlimited)
- Transmitter coordinates: 41°33′59.35″N 73°3′21.39″W
- Translator: 106.3 W292FI (Waterbury)

Links
- Public license information: Public file; LMS
- Webcast: Listen live
- Website: www.vivazona.com

WWCO (1240 kHz "Viva Radio") is a commercial radio station licensed to Waterbury, Connecticut, and owned by David Webster's Trignition Media LLC. WWCO is a simulcast of its sister station in New Britain, WRYM (840 AM); the stations' programming is also heard on WZKZ (1450 AM) in Bridgeport. WWCO, WRYM, and WZKZ all air a Spanish contemporary hit radio format, including reggaeton and tropical music.

WWCO transmits with 1,000 watts non-directional. The transmitter is on Thomaston Avenue in Waterbury, near the Naugatuck River. Programming is also heard on 200-watt FM translator W292FI on 106.3 MHz in Waterbury.

== History ==
=== Top 40 hits ===
WWCO signed on the air in 1946. It was originally powered at 250 watts. It was a network affiliate of the Mutual Broadcasting System with studios in the Mattatuck Historical Society Building at 119 West Main Street in Waterbury. As network programming moved from radio to television in the 1950s, WWCO had a format that was mostly pop music.

By the 1960s, WWCO was the first station in Waterbury to play rock and roll records and had a Top 40 format. On-air personalities during this era included Bob "Records" Crager, Les Davis, Joe Mulhall (later known as Ken Griffin in Hartford and Los Angeles), Bob Rouge and "Wildman Steve" Gallon. Davis and WWCO were featured in an article in the April 25, 1955, edition of Life magazine.

During the 1960s and the 1970s, WWCO was owned by TV entertainer Merv Griffin and operated as "1240 Super Music C-O". In 1967, WWCO added an FM station, WWCO-FM 104.1 (now WMRQ-FM). On-air personalities during this era included Tom Collins, later known as Joe Cipriano, the voice of the Fox network, CBS and NBC.

=== Adult contemporary and oldies ===
The station evolved from Top 40 to an adult contemporary format (called "All-Star Music WWCO") at about the same time as WKCI (KC-101) switched from easy listening to adult Top 40 as "KC-101". WKCI's switch to the new format may have hastened WWCO's departure from Top 40. Some WWCO personalities left to take jobs at KC-101.

In 1984, WWCO was sold to Westport resident Sam Brownstein and abandoned the "All-Star" format. It switched to 1950s and 1960s oldies under the direction of program director Mike Dowling.

=== Urban nights ===
The station found success with a night–time urban contemporary format called "Nightflight" which it used from 1984 to 1989. Ricky "J" was one of the DJs. Later financial issues caused WWCO to terminate some of its personalities and to carry Unistar's "Niche 29" adult album rock (AOR) format.

WWCO was sold to Winthrop Broadcasting, whose relatives owned Waterbury's WQQW (1590 AM; now silent). WWCO relocated from its longtime location on the Straits Turnpike in Middlebury to a new studio in Waterbury. By 1990, WWCO again returned to its old Top 40 format, again as "1240 Super Music 'C-O". Steve Skipp returned for a short tenure as program director, after which Wally Mann succeeded him and continued in that position as the station switched back to an oldies format.

General manager Tom Coffey and former WWYZ salesman Rob Johnson formed Mattatuck Communications and purchased the station. The studios moved to a new location. While most AM stations had already abandoned contemporary music, WWCO, and its on-air talent, continued into the early 1990s.

=== Buckley Broadcasting and Connoisseur Media ===
WWCO was then sold to Connecticut-based Buckley Broadcasting, the parent of WDRC in Hartford. WWCO moved to WDRC's studios in Bloomfield and began broadcasting the same programming as WDRC. WDRC's talk radio format was known as "The Talk of Connecticut". It also included AM stations in Meriden and Torrington.

On March 5, 2014, Buckley Broadcasting announced that it would sell its Connecticut radio stations, including WWCO, to Connoisseur Media. The sale was consummated on July 7, at a price of $7,922,035.

=== Trignition Media ===
WWCO was not included in the 2018 sale of WDRC and the other "Talk of Connecticut" stations to Red Wolf Broadcasting, which was completed on March 29, 2018. Instead, the station was sold to Trignition Media, owner of WRYM in New Britain, for $260,000.

In February 2018, WWCO left the "Talk of Connecticut" network and began simulcasting WRYM's "Viva" tropical format. Trignition Media's purchase of the station was completed on February 22, 2019. Both stations acquired translators so their programming could be heard on the FM band.

== FM translator ==
Call sign	Frequency	City of license	FID	ERP (W)	HAAT	Class	Transmitter coordinates	FCC info
W292FI	106.3 FM	Waterbury, Connecticut	200742	250	0 m (0 ft)	D	41°31′4.3″N 73°1′7.3″W	LMS
