= WWRX (FM) =

Radio station in Bradford, Rhode Island

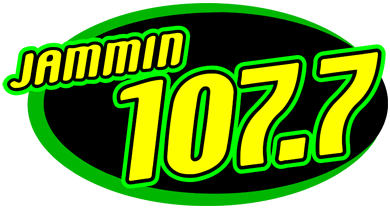
- Bradford, Rhode Island; United States
- Broadcast area: New London, Connecticut
- Frequency: 107.7 MHz
- Branding: "Jammin' 107.7"

Programming
- Format: Rhythmic contemporary
- Affiliations: Compass Media Networks

Ownership
- Owner: Full Power Radio; (Fuller Broadcasting International, LLC)
- Sister stations: WBMW; WJJF; WSKP

History
- First air date: November 30, 1995
- Former call signs: WKCD (1995–2002); WHJM (2002–2004); WWRX (2004–2013); WSKP (2013–2014)

Technical information
- Licensing authority: FCC
- Facility ID: 58731
- Class: A
- ERP: 1,050 watts
- HAAT: 170 meters (560 ft)
- Transmitter coordinates: 41°27′39.4″N 71°55′44.3″W

Links
- Public license information: Public file; LMS
- Webcast: Listen live
- Website: www.jammin1077.com

WWRX (107.7 MHz) is a rhythmic contemporary music formatted FM radio station, licensed to Bradford, Rhode Island, and serving the New London, Connecticut, area. The station is owned by Full Power Radio and broadcasts with an ERP of 1.05 kW.

== History ==
The station went on the air November 30, 1995, as WKCD, with a smooth jazz format; this was replaced with modern adult contemporary in 1999 (under owners Back Bay Broadcasting and AAA Entertainment). Following a sale to John Fuller's Red Wolf Broadcasting, the current format launched on September 19, 2002; initially using the WHJM call sign, it became WWRX in 2004 after 103.7 FM in Westerly, Rhode Island, changed its call letters from WWRX-FM to WEEI-FM (it is now WPVD-FM).

The station moved its city of license from Pawcatuck, Connecticut, to Ledyard, Connecticut, effective August 22, 2013. On December 24, 2013, WWRX changed its call letters to WSKP, swapping call letters with 1180 AM; the swap was reversed on April 23, 2014. WWRX again moved its community of license on November 16, 2015, from Ledyard, Connecticut, to Bradford, Rhode Island.
