= List of PBS member stations =

The following is a list of member stations for the Public Broadcasting Service (PBS), a television network and program service for non-commercial educational stations in the United States. This includes some regional and statewide networks of stations.

== Member stations ==
List of PBS member stations
City or region served	State/Dist./Terr.	Station or regional/statewide network	Channel	Notes
Statewide	Alabama	Alabama Public Television	xx.1	
Statewide	Alaska	Alaska Public Media (KAKM)	xx.1	
Fairbanks	Alaska	KUAC-TV	9	
Pago Pago	American Samoa	KVZK-TV	7	
Phoenix	Arizona	Arizona PBS (KAET)	8	
Tucson	Arizona	AZPM (KUAT-TV and KUAS-TV)	6 and 27	
Statewide	Arkansas	Arkansas TV	xx.1	
Chico–Redding	California	KIXE-TV	9	
Eureka	California	KEET	13	
Fresno	California	Valley PBS (KVPT)	18	
Los Angeles	California	PBS SoCal (KOCE-TV and KCET)	50 and 28	
Los Angeles	California	KLCS	58	
Monterey	California	KQET	25	(Note: Satellite of KQED.)
Sacramento	California	KVIE	6	
San Bernardino	California	KVCR-DT	24	
San Diego	California	KPBS	15	
San Francisco	California	KQED and KQEH	9 and 54	
San Francisco	California	Northern California Public Media (KRCB)	22	
Statewide	Colorado	Rocky Mountain PBS	xx.1	
Denver	Colorado	KBDI-TV	12	
Statewide	Connecticut	Connecticut Public Television	xx.1	
Seaford	Delaware	WDPB	64	(Note: Satellite of WHYY-TV.)
Washington	District of Columbia	WETA-TV	26	
Washington	District of Columbia	WHUT-TV	32	
Fort Myers	Florida	WGCU	30	
Fort Walton Beach–Pensacola	Florida	WPAN	53	
Gainesville	Florida	WUFT	5	
Jacksonville	Florida	WJCT	7	
Miami-Fort Lauderdale-West Palm Beach	Florida	South Florida PBS (WPBT)	2	
Miami-Fort Lauderdale	Florida	WLRN-TV	17	
Orlando	Florida	WUCF-TV	24	
Panama City	Florida	WFSG	56	(Note: Satellite of WFSU-TV.)
Tallahassee	Florida	WFSU-TV	11	
Tampa	Florida	WEDU and WEDQ	3.1 and 3.4	
West Palm Beach	Florida	South Florida PBS (WXEL-TV)	42	
Statewide	Georgia	Georgia Public Broadcasting	xx.1	
Atlanta	Georgia	WABE-TV	30	
Hagåtña	Guam	PBS Guam (KGTF)	12	
Statewide	Hawaii	PBS Hawai'i (KHET and KMEB)	11 and 10	
Statewide	Idaho	Idaho Public Television	xx.1	
Carbondale	Illinois	WSIU-TV and WUSI-TV	8 and 16	
Champaign–Springfield	Illinois	Illinois Public Media (WILL-TV)	12	
Chicago	Illinois	WTTW and WYIN	11	
Jacksonville	Illinois	WSEC	14	(Note: Satellite of WSIU.)
Macomb	Illinois	WMEC	22	
Moline	Illinois	WQPT-TV	24	
Peoria	Illinois	WTVP	47	
Quincy	Illinois	WQEC	27	
Bloomington	Indiana	WTIU	30	
Evansville	Indiana	WNIN	9	
Fort Wayne	Indiana	PBS Fort Wayne (WFWA)	39	
Gary	Indiana	Lakeshore PBS (WYIN)	56	
Indianapolis	Indiana	WFYI	20	
Muncie	Indiana	Ball State PBS (WIPB)	49	
South Bend	Indiana	Michiana PBS (WNIT)	34	
Statewide	Iowa	Iowa PBS	xx.1	
Hays–Dodge City	Kansas	Smoky Hills PBS	xx.1	
Topeka	Kansas	KTWU	11	
Wichita	Kansas	PBS Kansas (KPTS)	8	
Statewide	Kentucky	Kentucky Educational Television	xx.1	
Bowling Green	Kentucky	WKU PBS (WKYU-TV)	24	
Statewide	Louisiana	Louisiana Public Broadcasting	xx.1	
New Orleans	Louisiana	WYES-TV	12	
Statewide	Maine	Maine Public Broadcasting Network	xx.1	
Statewide	Maryland	Maryland Public Television	xx.1	
Boston	Massachusetts	GBH (WGBH-TV and WGBX-TV)	2 and 44	
Springfield	Massachusetts	New England Public Media (WGBY-TV)	57	
Detroit	Michigan	Detroit PBS (WTVS)	56	
East Lansing	Michigan	WKAR-TV	23	
Flint	Michigan	Delta College Public Media (WDCQ-TV)	19	
Grand Rapids–Kalamazoo	Michigan	WGVU Public Media	xx.1	
Marquette	Michigan	WNMU	13	
Mount Pleasant	Michigan	CMU Public Television	xx.1	
Granite Falls	Minnesota	Pioneer PBS	xx.1	
Bemidji–Brainerd	Minnesota	Lakeland PBS	xx.1	
Duluth	Minnesota	PBS North	xx.1	
Minneapolis–Saint Paul	Minnesota	Minnesota PBS (KTCA-TV and KTCI)	2.1 and 2.3	
Rochester	Minnesota	KSMQ-TV	15	(Note: Satellite of KTCA.)
Statewide	Mississippi	Mississippi Public Broadcasting	xx.1	
Springfield–Joplin	Missouri	Ozarks Public Television	xx.1	
Jefferson City	Missouri	KMOS-TV	6	
Kansas City	Missouri	Kansas City PBS (KCPT)	19	
St. Louis	Missouri	KETC	9	
Statewide	Montana	Montana PBS	xx.1	
Statewide	Nebraska	Nebraska Public Media	xx.1	
Las Vegas	Nevada	Vegas PBS (KLVX)	10	
Reno	Nevada	PBS Reno (KNPB)	5	
Statewide	New Hampshire	New Hampshire PBS	xx.1	
Statewide	New Jersey	NJ PBS	xx.1	
Newark-New York City	New Jersey	WNET	13	
Albuquerque–Santa Fe	New Mexico	New Mexico PBS (KNME-TV and KNMD-TV)	5	
Las Cruces	New Mexico	KRWG-TV	22	
Portales	New Mexico	KENW	3	
Albany-Schenectady-Troy	New York	WMHT	17	
Binghamton	New York	WSKG-TV	46	
Buffalo	New York	Buffalo Toronto Public Media (WNED-TV)	17	
Elmira	New York	WSKA	30	(Note: Satellite of WSKG.)
Long Island-New York City	New York	WLIW	21	
Plattsburgh	New York	Mountain Lake PBS (WCFE-TV)	57	
Rochester	New York	WXXI-TV	21	
Syracuse	New York	WCNY-TV	24	
Watertown–Norwood	New York	WPBS-TV and WNPI-DT	16 and 18	
Statewide	North Carolina	PBS North Carolina	xx.1	
Charlotte	North Carolina	PBS Charlotte (WTVI)	42	
Statewide	North Dakota	Prairie Public Television	xx.1	
Akron–Youngstown	Ohio	PBS Western Reserve (WNEO and WEAO)	45 and 49	
Athens	Ohio	WOUB-TV and WOUC-TV	20 and 44	
Bowling Green	Ohio	WBGU-TV	27	(Note: Satellite of WGTE.)
Cincinnati	Ohio	WCET	48	
Columbus	Ohio	WOSU-TV	34	
Cleveland	Ohio	Ideastream Public Media (WVIZ)	25	
Dayton	Ohio	Think TV (WPTD and WPTO)	14 and 16	
Toledo	Ohio	WGTE-TV	30	
Statewide	Oklahoma	Oklahoma Educational Television Authority	xx.1	
Statewide	Oregon	Oregon Public Broadcasting	xx.1	
Medford	Oregon	Southern Oregon PBS	xx.1	
San Juan	Puerto Rico	Sistema TV (WMTJ and WQTO)	40 and 26	
Allentown	Pennsylvania	PBS 39 (WLVT-TV and WPPT)	39 and 35	
Erie	Pennsylvania	WQLN	54	
Harrisburg	Pennsylvania	WITF-TV	33	
Philadelphia	Pennsylvania	WHYY-TV	12	
Pittsburgh	Pennsylvania	WQED	13	
Scranton	Pennsylvania	WVIA-TV	44	
State College–Johnstown	Pennsylvania	WPSU-TV	3	
Providence	Rhode Island	Ocean State Media (WPVD-TV)	36	
Statewide	South Carolina	South Carolina Educational Television	xx.1	
Statewide	South Dakota	South Dakota Public Broadcasting	xx.1	
Chattanooga	Tennessee	WTCI	45	
Jackson	Tennessee	West TN PBS (WLJT)	11	
Knoxville–Johnson City	Tennessee	East Tennessee PBS (WETP-TV and WKOP)	15 and 2	
Memphis	Tennessee	WKNO	10	
Nashville	Tennessee	Nashville PBS (WNPT)	8	
Nashville	Tennessee	WCTE	22	
Amarillo	Texas	Panhandle PBS (KACV-TV)	2	
Austin	Texas	Austin PBS (KLRU)	18	
Bryan–College Station	Texas	KAMU-TV	12	
Corpus Christi	Texas	KEDT	16	
Dallas–Fort Worth	Texas	KERA-TV	13	
El Paso	Texas	PBS El Paso (KCOS)	13	
Harlingen	Texas	PBS Rio Grande Valley (KCWT-CD)	21.4	(Note: KCWT-CD operates as a commercial station but carries the national PBS feed on its fourth digital subchannel.)
Houston	Texas	Houston Public Media (KUHT)	8	
Lubbock	Texas	Texas Tech Public Media (KTTZ-TV)	5	
Midland–Odessa	Texas	Basin PBS (KPBT-TV)	36	
San Antonio	Texas	KLRN	9	
Statewide	Utah	PBS Utah	xx.1	
Charlotte Amalie	U.S. Virgin Islands	WTJX-TV	12	
Statewide	Vermont	Vermont Public	xx.1	
Norfolk	Virginia	WHRO-TV	15	
Richmond	Virginia	VPM PBS (WCVE-TV)	23	
Roanoke	Virginia	Blue Ridge PBS (WBRA-TV)	15	
Southwest VA	Virginia	PBS Appalachia Virginia	Cable/streaming only	
Richland	Washington	Northwest Public Broadcasting (KTNW)	31	
Seattle	Washington	Cascade PBS (KCTS-TV)	9	
Tacoma–Centralia	Washington	KBTC-TV and KCKA	28 and 15	
Spokane	Washington	KSPS-TV	7	
Yakima	Washington	Cascade PBS (KYVE)	47	(Note: Satellite of KCTS-TV.)
Statewide	West Virginia	West Virginia Public Broadcasting	xx.1	
Statewide	Wisconsin	PBS Wisconsin	xx.1	
Milwaukee	Wisconsin	Milwaukee PBS (WMVS and WMVT)	10 and 36	
Statewide	Wyoming	Wyoming PBS	xx.1	
