= List of Create TV affiliates =

The following is a list of affiliates for Create, a digital subchannel network for non-commercial television stations, owned by American Public Television.

== Affiliates ==
List of Create affiliates
Media market	State/District	Station	Channel	Notes
Statewide	Alabama	Alabama Public Television	xx.3	
Anchorage	Alaska	KAKM	7.2	
Juneau	Alaska	KTOO-TV	3.2	
Statewide	Arkansas	Arkansas PBS	xx.2	
Cotati	California	KRCB	22.2	
Fresno	California	KVPT	18.3	
Los Angeles	California	KCET	28.2	
Los Angeles	California	KLCS	58.3	
Sacramento	California	KVIE	6.3	(Note: Part-time affiliate.)
San Bernardino	California	KVCR	24.4	
San Diego	California	KPBS	15.3	
Statewide	Colorado	Rocky Mountain PBS	xx.3	
Fort Myers	Florida	WGCU	30.3	
Gainesville	Florida	WUFT	5.2	
Jacksonville	Florida	WJCT	7.2	
Orlando	Florida	WUCF-TV	24.2	
Pensacola	Florida	WSRE	23.3	
Miami	Florida	WPBT	2.2	
Tallahassee	Florida	WFSU-TV	11.3	
Panama City	Florida	WFSG	56.3	(Note: Satellite of WFSU-TV.)
Tampa	Florida	WEDU	3.6	
Statewide	Georgia	Georgia Public Broadcasting	xx.2	
Statewide	Idaho	Idaho Public Television	xx.3	
Carbondale	Illinois	WSIU-TV	8.3	
Olney	Illinois	WUSI-TV	16.3	(Note: Satellite of WSIU-TV.)
Chicago	Illinois	WTTW	11.3	
Macomb	Illinois	WIUM	22.3	
Jacksonville–Springfield	Illinois	WSEC	14.3	
Quincy	Illinois	WQEC	27.3	
Peoria	Illinois	WTVP	47.3	
Urbana	Illinois	WILL-TV	12.3	
Bloomington	Indiana	WTIU	30.3	
Evansville	Indiana	WNIN	9.2	
Fort Wayne	Indiana	WFWA	39.3	
Indianapolis	Indiana	WFYI	20.3	
Muncie	Indiana	WIPB	49.2	
Statewide	Iowa	Iowa PBS	xx.4	
Topeka	Kansas	KTWU	11.3	
Wichita	Kansas	KPTS	8.3	
Regional	Kansas	Smoky Hills PBS	xx.4	
Bowling Green	Kentucky	WKYU-TV	24.2	
New Orleans	Louisiana	WYES-TV	12.3	
Statewide	Louisiana	Louisiana Public Broadcasting	xx.3	
Statewide	Maine	Maine Public Broadcasting Network	xx.2	
Statewide	Maryland	Maryland Public Television	xx.2	
Boston	Massachusetts	WGBX-TV	44.3	
Springfield	Massachusetts	WGBY-TV	57.4	
Detroit	Michigan	WTVS	56.3	
East Lansing	Michigan	WKAR-TV	23.3	
Flint	Michigan	WDCQ-TV	19.3	
Regional	Michigan	CMU Public Television	xx.3	
Regional	Michigan	WGVU Public Media	xx.3	
Austin	Minnesota	KSMQ-TV	15.3	
Regional	Minnesota	Lakeland PBS	xx.4	
Regional	Minnesota	PBS North	xx.3	
Regional	Minnesota	Pioneer PBS	xx.2	
Statewide	Mississippi	Mississippi Public Broadcasting	xx.3	
Kansas City	Missouri	KCPT	19.3	
St. Louis	Missouri	KETC	9.4	
Sedalia	Missouri	KMOS-TV	6.2	
Regional	Missouri	Ozarks Public Television	xx.3	
Statewide	Montana	Montana PBS	xx.3	
Statewide	Nebraska	Nebraska Public Media	xx.3	
Las Vegas	Nevada	KLVX-TV	10.2	
Reno	Nevada	KNPB	5.2	
Statewide	New Hampshire	New Hampshire PBS	xx.4	
Albuquerque	New Mexico	KNMD-TV	9.2	
Albuquerque	New Mexico	KNME-TV	5.5	
Binghamton	New York	WSKG-TV	46.3	
Buffalo	New York	WNED-TV	17.2	
Corning	New York	WSKA	30.3	(Note: Satellite of WSKG.)
Garden City	New York	WLIW	21.2	
Rochester	New York	WXXI-TV	21.3	
Schenectady	New York	WMHT	17.3	
Syracuse	New York	WCNY-TV	24.2	
Watertown	New York	WPBS-TV	16.2	
Norwood	New York	WNPI-DT	18.2	(Note: Satellite of WPBS.)
Bowling Green	Ohio	WBGU-TV	27.3	
Cincinnati	Ohio	WCET	48.2	
Columbus	Ohio	WOSU-TV	34.3	
Cleveland	Ohio	WVIZ	25.4	
Toledo	Ohio	WGTE-TV	30.3	
Statewide	Oklahoma	Oklahoma Educational Television Authority	xx.3	
Regional	Oregon	Southern Oregon PBS	xx.3	
Allentown	Pennsylvania	WLVT-TV	39.2	
Clearfield	Pennsylvania	WPSU-TV	3.2	
Erie	Pennsylvania	WQLN	54.2	
Pittsburgh	Pennsylvania	WQED	13.2	
Scranton	Pennsylvania	WVIA-TV	44.3	
Statewide	South Carolina	South Carolina Educational Television	xx.2	
Statewide	South Dakota	South Dakota Public Broadcasting	xx.3	
Chattanooga	Tennessee	WTCI	45.2	
Cookeville	Tennessee	WCTE	22.3	
Knoxville	Tennessee	East Tennessee PBS	xx.3	
Nashville	Tennessee	WNPT	8.4	
Lexington	Tennessee	WLJT	11.3	
Amarillo	Texas	KACV-TV	2.3	
Austin	Texas	KLRU	18.2	
College Station	Texas	KAMU	12.2	
Corpus Christi	Texas	KEDT	16.2	
Dallas	Texas	KERA-TV	13.3	
El Paso	Texas	KCOS	13.3	
Houston	Texas	KUHT	8.2	
Lubbock	Texas	KTTZ-TV	5.2	
San Antonio	Texas	KLRN	9.3	
Statewide	Utah	PBS Utah	xx.4	
Statewide	Vermont	Vermont Public	xx.3	
Norfolk	Virginia	WHRO-TV	15.4	
Roanoke	Virginia	WBRA-TV	15.4	
Richmond	Virginia	WCVE-TV	23.2	
Staunton	Virginia	WVPT	51.3	
Pullman	Washington	KWSU-TV	10.2	
Richland	Washington	KTNW	31.2	
Seattle	Washington	KCTS-TV	9.3	
Spokane	Washington	KSPS-TV	7.3	
Yakima	Washington	KYVE	47.3	(Note: Satellite of KCTS-TV.)
Milwaukee	Wisconsin	Milwaukee PBS	10.2	
Statewide	Wisconsin	PBS Wisconsin	xx.3	
Statewide	Wyoming	Wyoming PBS	xx.3	
