= WTCI =

Television station in Chattanooga, Tennessee

- Chattanooga, Tennessee; United States
- Channels: Digital: 35 (UHF); Virtual: 45
- Branding: WTCI PBS

Programming
- Affiliations: 45.1: PBS; for others, see § Subchannels

Ownership
- Owner: The Greater Chattanooga Public Television Corporation

History
- First air date: March 3, 1970
- Former channel numbers: Analog: 45 (UHF, 1970–2009); Digital: 29 (UHF, 2003–2019)
- Former affiliations: NET (March–October 1970)

Technical information
- Licensing authority: FCC
- Facility ID: 65667
- ERP: 200 kW
- HAAT: 353 m (1,158 ft)
- Transmitter coordinates: 35°12′26″N 85°16′52″W

Links
- Public license information: Public file; LMS
- Website: www.wtcitv.org

WTCI (channel 45) is a PBS member television station in Chattanooga, Tennessee, United States. Owned by the Greater Chattanooga Public Television Corporation, the station maintains studios on Bonnyshire Drive in Chattanooga, and its transmitter is located on Sawyer Cemetery Road in Hamilton County, Tennessee.

WTCI was the third of four stations built by the Tennessee Department of Education to expand public television coverage in Tennessee, signing on March 3, 1970. Its original studios were on the campus of what is now Chattanooga State Community College. It operated as a state-owned station until 1984, when it was spun out to a local board in the wake of a scandal that revealed inefficiencies in Tennessee's state-run public TV stations. As a result, WTCI began fundraising in the community. In 2007, it relocated to its present studios. The station produces local programming, including coverage of Chattanooga city council meetings and public affairs and cultural programs of regional interest.

== History ==
=== Early years ===
An educational television channel was allocated to Chattanooga in 1952, and as early as 1953, groups began analyzing the possibilities of the new medium in Chattanooga. Movement around constructing such a station locally did not come until May 1961, when the Tri-State Educational Television Council was formed. It hired experts with the goal of preparing an application for the reserved educational channel, 55. Meanwhile, plans for a statewide network began to progress as the state legislature appropriated funds, and the Tennessee Department of Education took the lead in planning the Chattanooga station. By 1963, the state government had filed with the Federal Communications Commission (FCC) to switch channel 55 to channel 14, which would be lower and have a better coverage area. At that time, the studio was planned to be located in the women's gymnasium at the University of Chattanooga, which was to be replaced; the state rejected this plan because it meant granting money to a private institution. The FCC, in 1965, instead assigned channel 38; the state began scouting tower sites for the proposed station. By April 1966, applications were on file with the FCC for a construction permit and the U.S. Department of Health, Education and Welfare for grant money; it had been switched to channel 45. The new plans called for the station's studios to be built at Chattanooga State Technical College, with a transmitter on Signal Mountain. The two channel realignments contributed to later delays in construction of the station because many engineering studies needed to be redone.

The FCC awarded the construction permit in July 1966, and final state approval for construction was obtained the next month. However, it took several years to get WTCI in operation, due to channel changes and issues with the title to the Signal Mountain site. A chancery court proceeding was necessary to clear the title to the property before construction could proceed. Final plans for the station's facilities were submitted in February 1968, and a contract for studio construction was let in May.

WTCI began broadcasting on March 3, 1970. It was affiliated with National Educational Television, which was supplanted as the public television network by PBS that October. While the station could air filmed and network programs in color, it lacked color studio cameras for its own productions; in 1972, the state applied to the federal government for grant funding to purchase color-capable cameras and taping equipment. By that year, WTCI's educational programs reached 370,000 students in 16 local school systems.

=== Split from state control ===
WTCI was the third of four stations built by the Tennessee Department of Education to expand educational television coverage in Tennessee, alongside WSJK-TV in Sneedville (serving Knoxville and the Tri-Cities) and WLJT in Lexington and Martin. A fourth station, WCTE-TV in Cookeville, followed in 1978. In addition, there were educational stations in Nashville and Memphis (WDCN-TV and WKNO, respectively), which were not owned by the state.

In 1980, a controversy brewed whose effects would change the course of educational television in much of Tennessee. The year before, WSJK-TV general manager Al Curtis had produced a 30-minute documentary on the successful 1978 gubernatorial campaign of Republican Lamar Alexander, The Extra Mile. The film used his campaign theme song, and most of the source footage was shot by a consulting firm for his campaign, though a WTCI crew also participated. The consultant, Doug Bailey, noted he had input in the production of the program. Gene Dietz, a Democrat and head of the state network, denied Curtis permission to broadcast the program. At the time, Curtis was in line to succeed Dietz. However, when the issue came to light, state education commissioner Ed Cox abolished the position and began a formal audit. Dietz described his firing as politically motivated and called the rejected program "pure political propaganda".

This controversy led the state comptroller to audit the state educational television system, and Governor Alexander asked the Finance Department to evaluate the program. In April, it recommended all the stations be spun out to local community control. The report criticized the heavy bias in favor of state-owned stations in funding decisions, which disadvantaged the community-owned stations. A separate inquiry into the educational television system, produced by consultant Donald Mullally for the Tennessee Higher Education Commission, returned its findings in July. Citing underfunding compared to state networks in other Southern states and the same inequities found in the Finance Department report, it too called for the state educational television apparatus to be disbanded and WTCI to be put under local control. A local council was just one idea on the table. State senator Ray Albright floated transferring WTCI to the University of Tennessee at Chattanooga (UTC) or Chattanooga State, and an amendment to allow UTC to take possession of channel 45 progressed through the state legislature. State legislator Bobby Wood did not obstruct the amendment but disapproved of the idea, fearing that WTCI under UTC control would simply become a promotional vehicle for the university.

Ultimately, the council plan came to fruition. In April 1981, the Tennessee legislature passed the Tennessee Educational Television Network Act of 1981, which was signed by Governor Alexander in May. This legislation provided for the transfer of the four Department of Education-owned stations to community entities by 1986. A 24-member board was convened in October to provide oversight to WTCI, and by 1982, the 30-member Greater Chattanooga Public Television Corporation was in existence. It became the licensee of WTCI on July 1, 1984. The Tennessee Educational Television Network Act authorized the stations being spun out by the state to raise funds in the community for the first time; with WTCI needing to raise as much as 47 percent of its budget by 1985 from private sources, in order to offset declines in federal and state revenue, the station began airing pledge drives in August 1981 and ramped up its efforts to seek local donors.

In 1991, Tennessee discontinued all financial subsidies for public television, leading to a 37-percent decrease in WTCI's operating revenue. Victor Hogstrom, the then-new general manager, worked to increase station viewership and membership to help the station soften the blow, though cuts to staff and the budget were still necessary. A second round of staff reorganization and layoffs was carried out in 1998 as federal and local support continued to dwindle. In addition, the station's transmitter, which had been replaced in 1989, had been unreliable; by 1998, it had needed to be nearly totally rebuilt, and on two occasions, malfunctioning high-voltage contacts had to be temporarily replaced with silver dimes so the transmitter could run.

=== Digitalization and new studios ===
In 2003, WTCI announced it would relocate from its old studios located on the Chattanooga State campus to its current location on Bonnyshire Drive, since the cost of renovating the 37-year-old building was deemed prohibitive. Previously, station manager Victor Hogstrom had pointed out the location had poor visibility, as the Chattanooga State campus had grown around it. The station did not relocate to the facility until October 2007; construction work was necessary to build out the shell of the building, which had once housed a batting cage, to hold two studios and offices. The previous building was sold back to Chattanooga State for incorporation into its campus as a classroom and laboratory building. Previously, Chattanooga State had made overtures toward a merger with WTCI, a move rebuffed by station board members, who felt the proposed transfer amounted to a takeover. Later, in 2015, the University of Tennessee at Chattanooga floated spinning off its public radio station, WUTC, and having it merge with WTCI to counter budget shortfalls.

Paul Grove, who had been WTCI's general manager for 13 years, left the station in 2019 to become the general manager of WEDU in Tampa, Florida. He was replaced by Bob Culkeen, who had served in management positions for a variety of public TV stations.

== Local programming ==
WTCI produces a range of local public affairs and community service programs. In 2022–23, these included a documentary series, Greater Chattanooga; The A List with Alison Lebovitz, a weekly interview show; and weekly highlights of Chattanooga City Council meetings.

== Funding ==
In fiscal year 2022, WTCI had total revenue of $2.6 million. The Corporation for Public Broadcasting provided $805,000, most of that in the form of a Community Service Grant. The state government of Tennessee provided $464,000. The station had 3,371 members who donated $329,689, as well as 38 major individual donors who contributed $113,217.

== Technical information ==
=== Subchannels ===
WTCI's transmitter is located on Sawyer Cemetery Road in Hamilton County. The station's signal is multiplexed:

Subchannels of WTCI
Subchannel	Res.	Short name	Programming
45.1	1080i	WTCI-HD	PBS
45.2	480i	Create	Create
45.3	480i	Kids	PBS Kids

=== Analog-to-digital conversion ===
WTCI shut down its analog signal, over UHF channel 45, on February 17, 2009, the original target date on which full-power television stations in the United States were to transition from analog to digital broadcasts under federal mandate (which was later pushed back to June 12, 2009). The station's digital signal remained on its pre-transition UHF channel 29, using virtual channel 45. WTCI relocated its signal from channel 29 to channel 35 on September 6, 2019, as a result of the 2016 United States wireless spectrum auction.
