= WYHB =

WYHB may refer to:

- WYHB-CD, a low-power television station (channel 25, virtual 39) licensed to serve Chattanooga, Tennessee, United States
- WHUA-LP, a defunct low-power television station (channel 39) formerly licensed to serve Chattanooga, Tennessee, which held the call sign WYHB-LP from 1995 to 2003 and WHYB-CA from 2003 to 2018
