= KXWT =

Odessa, Texas; United States
- Broadcast area: Midland–Odessa, Texas
- Frequency: 91.3 MHz
- Branding: Marfa Public Radio

Programming
- Format: Public radio
- Affiliations: National Public Radio, Public Radio International

Ownership
- Owner: Marfa Public Radio
- Sister stations: KRTS

History
- First air date: January 6, 1964
- Former call signs: KOCV (1964–2012)
- Call sign meaning: "Across West Texas"

Technical information
- Licensing authority: FCC
- Facility ID: 50038
- Class: C3
- ERP: 20,000 watts
- HAAT: 112 meters
- Transmitter coordinates: 32°02′54″N 102°18′04″W

Links
- Public license information: Public file; LMS
- Webcast: Listen live
- Website: marfapublicradio.org

KXWT (91.3 FM) is a listener-supported public radio licensed to Odessa, Texas, and is owned and operated by Marfa Public Radio. Until 2012, it was owned and operated by Odessa College. It is the National Public Radio member station for Odessa, Midland and the Permian Basin. KXWT now operates at an assigned frequency of 91.3 MHz with an effective radiated power of 20,000 watts. With the purchase of KXWT by Marfa Public Radio, a new transmitter was built in Gardendale to allow the frequency to boost to Andrews, Crane, and other surrounding areas.

The station operated under the branding of West Texas Public Radio until 2018, when its branding was consolidated into Marfa Public Radio. The station is now operated out of Marfa Public Radio's studios in Marfa, but still airs a partially separate schedule from Marfa Public Radio flagship KRTS and its three satellites.

== Programming ==
Last logo for KXWT before its separate branding was dropped

KXWT's format is primarily news and talk from National Public Radio and locally produced music content. Genres of music played by the station include Classical Music, Jazz, Blues, World Music, Celtic music, Folk music, and Bluegrass music.

Until the purchase by Marfa Public Radio, on-air program hosts were Odessa College students and volunteers, including bluegrass legend Bill Myrick and Tom Millhollon. Marfa Public Radio also provided some of the news programs. With the purchase by Marfa Public Radio, the College will no longer be involved in any fashion. Marfa Public Radio will provide all programming content and will have some full and part-time employees solely devoted to KXWT. The station will continue to rely heavily on NPR programming, but additional programming is expected.

== See also ==
- KPBT-TV (PBS member station originally owned by Odessa College)
