= PBS Kids =

American children's programming brand

- Logo used since 2022
- Network: PBS
- Launched: August 30, 1993; 33 years ago (as PTV); September 6, 1999; 27 years ago (as PBS Kids)
- Country of origin: United States
- Formerly known as: PTV (1993–99)
- Official website: pbskids.org

PBS Kids (stylized in all caps; formerly known as PTV), is the branding used for nationally distributed children's programming carried by the American public television network PBS. The brand encompasses a daytime block of children's programming carried daily by most PBS member stations, a 24-hour channel carried on the digital subchannels of PBS member stations (sometimes called the PBS Kids Channel or PBS Kids 24/7), and its accompanying digital platforms.

PBS Kids programming typically targets children between the ages of 2 and 8, with a focus on live-action and animated series featuring educational and informative (E/I) components; some of its programs were developed under grants with the Corporation for Public Broadcasting as part of PBS and CPB's "Ready-to-Learn" initiative. From 2004 to 2013, a late-afternoon sub-block known as PBS Kids Go! broadcast programming targeting elementary school-aged viewers 6 to 8; the brand was discontinued in 2013 to focus more on the main PBS Kids brand.

PBS Kids was introduced in 1999, succeeding a precursor—PTV—which was introduced in 1993 on selected PBS stations as a blanket branding for the network's array of existing children's programming (such as Mister Rogers' Neighborhood and Sesame Street). The introduction of PBS Kids coincided with a larger investment into children's programming by the organization, and a PBS Kids channel that would be distributed via a mixture of cable, satellite, and digital terrestrial television platforms. However, the channel proved unsuccessful and shut down in 2005.

From 2005 to 2013, PBS partnered with Comcast, HIT Entertainment, and Sesame Workshop to operate an ad-supported cable network known as PBS Kids Sprout; Comcast would later acquire the network outright in 2013 via its NBCUniversal division. PBS Kids would later relaunch its 24-hour channel in 2017, operating via digital terrestrial television and streaming.

The PBS Kids block originally ran throughout the morning and afternoon on the network's national schedule; in February 2023, the block was cut from 13 to 8 hours per-day, citing shifts towards PBS Kids' digital platforms, as well as member stations who had cut back on the block to schedule more afternoon programming targeting adult viewers.

== History ==
=== PTV block ===
PBS had historically aired programs for children such as Sesame Street, Mister Rogers' Neighborhood, and Reading Rainbow; prior to 1993, these programs aired under general PBS branding. In August 1993, PBS introduced new branding for their children's programs featuring the "P-Pals", animated characters shaped like the PBS "P-head" logo who encouraged skills such as gathering information, self-esteem, cooperation and achieving goals in specially developed interstitials.

The framework for PBS Kids was established as part of PBS' "Ready to Learn" initiative, a project intended to facilitate access of early childhood educational programming to underprivileged children. On July 11, 1994, PBS repackaged their existing children's educational programming as a new block titled "PTV", airing on 11 member stations at launch. In addition to scheduled educational programming, PTV also incorporated interstitial content with the P-Pals in their fictional world "PTV Park" for younger children. Older children were targeted with live-action and music video interstitials.

Apple Computer provided a $1.5 million grant to PTV and became its first national underwriter on June 26, 1995, as part of their "Bring Learning Home" corporate initiative. A "Ready To Learn" grant unveiled on January 8, 1996, supported the development of Dragon Tales and Between the Lions, which premiered in 1999 and 2000, respectively, as well as their online activities and outreach efforts. By September 1996, 95 PBS stations reaching three quarters of the United States were carrying the PTV service. Starting on October 7, 1996, PBS packaged their programs for school-aged children into the block The Game, airing on 31 stations by the end of the year.

=== PBS Kids ===
On January 18, 1999, PBS announced that it would launch the PBS Kids Channel, meant to be the centerpiece of a larger initiative, in September 1999 (initially July 1999). On June 9, 1999, PBS revealed a wide rebranding of its children's programs and services, known as PBS Kids, at its annual meeting in San Francisco. PBS would also increase its children's programming budget by 25% and commit to two new series: Caillou and Anne of Green Gables: The Animated Series.

The rebranding to "PBS Kids" first took effect on September 6, 1999, when PBS launched the 24-hour PBS Kids Channel. The new PBS Kids branding elements began rolling out on PBS stations in October 1999; PBS provided grants to stations who adopted the new branding early. Brand designers incorporated a thought bubble concept across the brand packaging, intended to associate "imagination, thinking and using your head" with PBS Kids. Included with the new on-air appearance was a bright green logo featuring iconic boy and girl mascot characters Dash and Dot. On February 1, 2000, the PBS Kids website was officially relaunched with an expanded array of interactive content.

The PBS Kids Channel was unsuccessful; in 2005, PBS entered into a commercial joint venture with Comcast, HIT Entertainment, Sesame Workshop to launch a replacement known as PBS Kids Sprout, which would be a 24-hour channel targeting a preschool audience. In the early-2010s, the partners sold their stakes in Sprout to Comcast (via subsidiary NBCUniversal), who assumed full ownership of the channel in 2013.

In October 2004, PBS Kids launched a late-afternoon sub-block known as PBS Kids Go!; this block featured programming directed at school-aged children within the oldest subset of the existing PBS Kids demographic (generally ages 6 to 8). PBS had also planned to launch a dedicated PBS Kids Go! channel as a digital network in October 2006, but was later cancelled before launch. In October 2013, PBS Kids Go! was discontinued as part of a rebranding of the PBS Kids block, citing market research finding that the PBS Kids brand was more recognizable than PBS Kids Go!, and that a number of programs across both brands were being viewed widely by both preschool and school-aged viewers—making the need for a second block redundant.

PBS revived the PBS Kids Channel on January 16, 2017, this time being structured as an over-the-top and digital multicast television network with an online livestream of the channel on the PBS Kids website and video app, in addition to utilizing largely the same distribution methods that had been used for the original channel. At the time of launch, no changes were made to the main PBS Kids block on PBS. The block is counter programmed from the channel, thus the same show would not be shown at the same time on the channel and block.

In November 2020, PBS Kids, in association with the main PBS service, became the terrestrial television home of select specials from the Peanuts animated library, under a sub-licensing agreement with Apple TV+. The agreement allowed both PBS and the PBS Kids Channel to air It's the Great Pumpkin, Charlie Brown, A Charlie Brown Thanksgiving, and A Charlie Brown Christmas over the air, once per year. After the 2021 holiday season, the agreement with PBS ended, and since then, the Peanuts specials have not aired on American broadcast television.

On July 19, 2022, PBS Kids introduced a new brand identity developed by the creative consultancy Lippincott. The rebranding aligns with the parent network's visual system by changing the primary logo to an electric blue circle. It features a slightly modified version of the existing PBS Kids wordmark—retained to preserve brand recognition among younger viewers—rendered in green and white. The Dash mascot was discontinued, but supplanted by a new system of customizable cartoon characters seen in promos. The characters have customizable facial features, skin tones, and disability aids to reflect a diverse youth audience and how they portray themselves.

In February 2023, a major shift in program scheduling reduced the duration of the daytime PBS Kids block on local PBS stations significantly. Previously, the PBS Kids block encompassed a much larger portion of the daytime schedule, with the national schedule consisting of 13 hours of programming both before- and after-school hours throughout the morning and afternoon. The cuts would reduce its duration to eight hours. Many PBS stations had already begun transitioning to shorter morning blocks, but this change pushed nearly all stations to shorten their daytime children's schedules to morning hours only. PBS cited changes in viewing behaviors, and decided that it was advantageous to focus their children's programming in the mornings and cater to more general audiences in the afternoons, while continuing to grow their audience on the 24/7 kids service.

=== Streaming and on-demand video ===
As online streaming began to increase in popularity, PBS launched the PBS Kids Go! video player on its website on September 8, 2008. This federally funded, innovative video streaming platform featured video clips from a number of PBS Kids Go! shows which rotated on a weekly basis and linked to interactive online games. The video player later expanded to include all PBS Kids programming, and the entire platform evolved into the PBS Kids Video app, which initially became publicly available for free on May 12, 2011. The PBS Kids Video app is currently the primary source for free streaming of on-demand video clips and full episodes of PBS Kids programming. The app also features a free live stream of the 24/7 PBS Kids Channel.

On May 8, 2013, PBS Kids programming was added to the Roku streaming player.

On July 1, 2016, Amazon Prime Video and PBS Distribution entered into a multi-year agreement which saw several PBS Kids series on other streaming services move to Amazon Prime Video. The PBS Kids subscription allows children and families to stream nearly all PBS Kids programs currently broadcast on air; however, notable exceptions include Sesame Street, which streams on HBO Max, and Curious George, which streams on NBCUniversal's Peacock. The PBS Kids add-on service also includes several older series, such as Reading Rainbow, Kratts' Creatures, and It's a Big Big World.

On April 23, 2024, The Roku Channel added PBS Retro, a free ad-supported streaming channel, which consists of older PBS Kids programming, such as Mister Rogers' Neighborhood and Reading Rainbow.

=== International distribution ===
A selection of PBS Kids brand programming is available outside of the United States through PBS Distribution, PBS International and GBH, who jointly offer a PBS Kids subscription channel and on-demand video services to international audiences.

PBS Distribution partnered with MultiChoice to launch PBS Kids on May 22, 2019, on DStv and GOtv platforms across its Sub-Saharan Africa footprint. The channel was discontinued by the end of August 2024.

PBS Distribution partnered with Foxtel to launch PBS Kids on July 1, 2021, in Australia. The channel was discontinued two years later on July 1, 2023.

== Programming ==
For list of all PBS Kids programs, see List of programs broadcast by PBS Kids.

=== Programming blocks ===
==== Current ====
- PBS Kids Family Night (April 21, 2017 – present) – an evening programming block airing encores of PBS Kids movies and specials, and themed mini-marathons, typically from 7 to 9 pm on Saturdays and Sundays (formerly also on Fridays). Exclusive to the 24/7 PBS Kids Channel.

==== Former ====
- The Game (October 7, 1996 – September 5, 1999) – an afternoon programming block aimed at children ages 6 to 8. Aired on PTV.
- PBS Kids Bookworm Bunch (September 30, 2000 – September 5, 2004) – a Saturday morning block consisting of six animated series produced by the Canadian animation studio, Nelvana Limited.
- PBS Kids Go! (October 11, 2004 – October 6, 2013) – an afternoon programming block aimed at children ages 6 to 8.
- PBS Kids Preschool Block (September 4, 2006 – October 6, 2013) – a morning programming block aimed at preschoolers.

== Critical reception ==
PBS Kids programming has historically received generally positive reviews from television critics and parents of young children. L.A. Story (a division of Blogspot) wrote, "Great for any little explorer!" Rob Owen of Pittsburgh Post-Gazette wrote, "Best children's entertainment available". Valerie Williams of Scary Mommy wrote, "A wonderful gift". Steve Aquino of Forbes wrote, "Making learning accessible in the coronavirus age". PBS Kids was named of Channel of the Year at the 2015 and 2025 Kidscreen Awards respectively.

== 24/7 network ==
PBS Kids Channel
- Logo used since 2022
- Type: Digital broadcast TV network FAST TV network
- Country: United States, Sub-Saharan Africa
- Broadcast area: Nationwide (via OTA digital television)
- Affiliates: List of affiliates
- Headquarters: Crystal City, Virginia, U.S.

Programming
- Picture format: 480i (SDTV) (some affiliates transmit PBS Kids programming in 1080i 16:9 and 720p 16:9)

Ownership
- Owner: PBS

History
- Founded: January 18, 1999; 27 years ago (original); February 23, 2016; 10 years ago (revival)
- Launched: September 6, 1999; 27 years ago (original); January 16, 2017; 9 years ago (revival)
- Closed: September 26, 2005; 21 years ago (original)
- Replaced by: PBS Kids Sprout (original)

Links
- Webcast: PBS Kids Live TV
- Website: pbskids.org

Availability

Streaming media
- Service(s): DirecTV Stream, Hulu + Live TV, Prime Video Live TV, Samsung TV Plus, YouTube TV

The PBS Kids Channel (also known as PBS Kids 24/7) is an American digital broadcast and FAST television network operated by the Public Broadcasting Service. The network features a broad mix of live action and animated children's programs distributed to PBS by independent companies and select member stations, which are designed for improving the early literacy, math, and social-emotional skills of young children ages 3 to 9. Some PBS member stations, most notably KLCS in Los Angeles and WDCQ-TV in Bad Axe, Michigan, maintain their own locally programmed PBS Kids feed that is independent from the nationally sourced feed.

The PBS Kids Channel has had two iterations in the age of digital television; one which existed between 1999 and 2005, and the current version which was launched in 2017.

=== Network history ===
==== Original channel (1999–2005) ====
On September 6, 1999, PBS launched a 24-hour PBS Kids network in several markets, in conjunction with the overall introduction of the PBS Kids brand to provide a unified branding for the service's children's programming offerings. The separate network (referred to as the PBS Kids Channel in press materials) was available on high-tier subscription providers, and was also offered to PBS member stations for use on a "cablecast" service (a subscription-based local channel provided by the member station) or for use on the member station's free-to-air analog channel to provide a portion of the daytime PBS Kids programming on the station. Participating stations were required to pay an annual fee of $1,000 to use the feed. The channel was launched on over 30 PBS member stations with carriage methods ranging from a cable-only service, to a standard-definition digital subchannel, to analog simulcasts. Additional affiliates would pick up the channel later throughout the fall and winter of 1999.

FCC requirements mandated satellite providers to set aside 4% of their available channel space for noncommercial educational and informational programming. With these providers limited to offering one such service per programmer, PBS had put forth PBS Kids as a prospective channel to fulfill this mandate.

The channel was largely funded by satellite provider DirecTV. It was partly created to compete against the Nick Jr. block and its sister network Noggin; at the time, Noggin was co-owned by the Children's Television Workshop (the production company behind Sesame Street) and Nickelodeon. Because the pay-TV rights to the Children's Television Workshop's programs were owned by Noggin, the channel did not broadcast CTW programming, including longtime PBS staple Sesame Street, though exceptions were made with two CTW-produced shows, Dragon Tales and Sagwa, the Chinese Siamese Cat, the former of which premiered on the same day as the launch of the PBS Kids Channel.

The channel was unsuccessful and had only reached 9 million households as of 2002, compared to Noggin's 23.3 million households at the time. In the aftermath of DirecTV's decision not to renew its funding agreement with the channel, which ended in the third quarter of 2005, PBS decided to shut down the network on September 26 of that year. The PBS Kids Channel was effectively supplanted on that date by PBS Kids Sprout, an advertiser-supported cable and satellite channel that PBS developed in a joint venture with Sesame Workshop, HIT Entertainment and Comcast (the latter of which later bought full control of the network via NBCUniversal).

PBS gave local stations an option to sign on PBS Kids Sprout promoters, providing them cross-promotional and monetary benefits in exchange for giving up the ability to carry a competing preschool-targeted channel. For example, PBS member station WBGU-TV aired promotional spots for PBS Kids Sprout during their PBS Kids daytime block, thereby forfeiting their eligibility to air a children's channel locally. 80 stations, making up about half of the member stations participants, signed up to be promoters; most of the remaining stations opted to develop independent children's programming services featuring programs distributed by PBS and through outside distributors such as American Public Television to fill space on digital subchannels that formerly served as PBS Kids Channel members. Many of the member stations that launched children's-focused subchannel or cable-only services reduced the amount of sourced programming from PBS Kids carried on their primary channel to a few hours of their weekday daytime schedules, in order to program more adult-targeted fare during the afternoon.

==== Closure ====
The closure of the PBS Kids Channel left many local PBS stations with a vacancy on their multicast digital channel offerings, during a time when digital and high-definition broadcasts were increasing reach and gaining popularity. In April 2006, PBS announced plans for a replacement 24-hour digital multicast network called the PBS Kids Go! Channel. This would expand upon the afternoon PBS Kids Go! block on PBS, with additional new content and reruns of returning programs, such as HIT Entertainment's Wishbone and Kratts' Creatures. Other exclusive content for this channel would include a one-hour Spanish-language block called "PBS Kids Vayan!" (Spanish for "Go!", which would air select shows in Spanish with English subtitles), an evening "Go! Family" block, and an educational "Go! Figure" school block.

The PBS Kids Go! Channel was originally set to launch in October 2006. However, stations found that the sliding scale licensing fees were too high for what little exclusive programming they would have received, especially after spending additional funds for the PBS HD feed. With only one-third of PBS stations initially committing to carry the new network, the plans for the channel were ultimately withdrawn.

==== Revived channel (2017–present) ====
On February 23, 2016, PBS announced that the 24/7 PBS Kids channel would be revived after 11 years. PBS president and CEO Paula Kerger stated that during PBS's partnership with Comcast in their operations of Sprout, PBS had discovered the valuable position in children's programming during prime time.

Originally set for a fall 2016 relaunch, PBS Kids 24/7 was officially relaunched on January 16, 2017. Structured as a multi-platform service, it was made available for distribution to digital subchannels of participating PBS member stations, initially launching on 73 member stations (counting those operated as subregional PBS member networks), with an additional 34 agreeing to begin carrying the network at a later date. A free online live stream of PBS Kids 24/7 was also added to the PBS Kids website and video app upon the channel's debut, allowing viewers to toggle from the program being aired to a related educational game extending the interactivity introduced by Sesame Street. The live stream also provides access to the channel even in areas where some local PBS stations, such as WUFT in Gainesville, Florida and WEIU-TV in Charleston, Illinois, do not carry it on its subchannels. PBS Kids 24/7 is also available on DirecTV on channel 288.

PBS Kids 24/7 is counterprogramed from the PBS Kids block on PBS, so that the same program would not be shown on either simultaneously. It mainly features double-runs of existing series on PBS Kids' schedule (including some not carried on the primary channels of certain member stations); as such, no additional programs had to be acquired to help fill the channel's schedule. On April 21, 2017, the channel launched "PBS Kids Family Night," a weekly block on Friday evenings (with encore airings on Saturday and Sunday evenings) that showcase themed programming, premieres or special "movie-length" episodes of new and existing PBS Kids children's programs.

=== Affiliates ===
List of PBS Kids 24/7 affiliates
City of license/market	State/District	Station	Channel	Notes
Birmingham	Alabama	WBIQ	10.2	
Demopolis	Alabama	WIIQ	41.2	
Dozier	Alabama	WDIQ	2.2	
Florence	Alabama	WFIQ	36.2	
Huntsville	Alabama	WHIQ	25.2	
Louisville	Alabama	WGIQ	43.2	
Mobile	Alabama	WEIQ	42.2	
Montgomery	Alabama	WAIQ	26.2	
Mount Cheaha	Alabama	WCIQ	7.2	
Anchorage	Alaska	KAKM	7.4	
Fairbanks	Alaska	KUAC-TV	9.8	
Arkadelphia	Arkansas	KETG	9.3	
El Dorado	Arkansas	KETZ	12.3	
Fayetteville	Arkansas	KAFT	13.3	
Jonesboro	Arkansas	KTEJ	19.3	
Little Rock	Arkansas	KETS	2.3	
Mountain View	Arkansas	KEMV	6.3	
Phoenix	Arizona	KAET	8.4	
Tucson	Arizona	KUAT-TV	6.2	
Fresno	California	KVPT	18.2	
Los Angeles	California	KLCS	58.2	
Los Angeles	California	KOCE-TV	50.5	
Sacramento	California	KVIE	6.4	
San Diego	California	KPBS	15.4	
San Francisco	California	KQED	9.4	
San Jose	California	KQEH	54.4	
Watsonville	California	KQET	25.4	
Denver	Colorado	KRMA-TV	6.2	
Durango	Colorado	KRMU	20.2	
Grand Junction	Colorado	KRMJ	18.2	
Pueblo	Colorado	KTSC	8.2	
Bridgeport	Connecticut	WEDW	49.4	
Hartford	Connecticut	WEDH	24.4	
New Haven	Connecticut	WEDY	65.4	
New London	Connecticut	WEDN	53.4	
Washington	District of Columbia	WETA-TV	26.3	
Washington	District of Columbia	WHUT-TV	32.2	
Fort Myers	Florida	WGCU	30.5	
Jacksonville	Florida	WJCT	7.5	
Miami	Florida	WPBT	2.4	
Orlando	Florida	WUCF-TV	24.3	
Panama City	Florida	WFSG	56.4	
Tallahassee	Florida	WFSU-TV	11.4	
Tampa-St. Petersburg	Florida	WEDQ	3.5	
Athens–Atlanta	Georgia	WGTV	8.4	
Chatsworth	Georgia	WNGH-TV	18.4	
Cochran	Georgia	WMUM-TV	29.4	
Columbus	Georgia	WJSP-TV	28.4	
Dawson	Georgia	WACS-TV	25.4	
Pelham	Georgia	WABW-TV	14.4	
Savannah	Georgia	WVAN-TV	9.4	
Waycross–Valdosta–Brunswick	Georgia	WXGA-TV	8.4	
Wrens	Georgia	WCES-TV	20.4	
Honolulu	Hawaii	KHET	11.2	
Wailuku–Maui	Hawaii	KMEB	10.2	
Boise	Idaho	KAID	4.5	
Coeur D'Alene	Idaho	KCDT	26.5	
Moscow	Idaho	KUID-TV	12.5	
Pocatello	Idaho	KISU-TV	10.5	
Twin Falls	Idaho	KIPT	13.5	
Carbondale	Illinois	WSIU-TV	8.5	
Olney	Illinois	WUSI-TV	19.5	
Chicago	Illinois	WTTW	11.4	
Peoria	Illinois	WTVP	47.2	
Urbana–Springfield	Illinois	WILL-TV	12.2	
Bloomington	Indiana	WTIU	30.4	
Evansville	Indiana	WNIN	9.2	
Fort Wayne	Indiana	WFWA	39.2	
Indianapolis	Indiana	WFYI	20.2	
South Bend	Indiana	WNIT	34.3	
Council Bluffs	Iowa	KBIN-TV	32.4	
Davenport	Iowa	KQIN	36.4	
Des Moines	Iowa	KDIN-TV	11.4	
Fort Dodge	Iowa	KTIN	21.4	
Iowa City	Iowa	KIIN	12.4	
Mason City	Iowa	KYIN	24.4	
Red Oak	Iowa	KHIN	36.4	
Sioux City	Iowa	KSIN-TV	27.4	
Waterloo	Iowa	KRIN	32.4	
Colby	Kansas	KWKS	19.2	
Dodge City	Kansas	KDCK	21.2	
Hays	Kansas	KOOD	9.2	
Lakin	Kansas	KSWK	3.2	
Topeka	Kansas	KTWU	11.2	
Hutchinson–Wichita	Kansas	KPTS	8.4	
Ashland	Kentucky	WKAS	25.4	
Bowling Green	Kentucky	WKGB-TV	53.4	
Covington	Kentucky	WCVN-TV	54.4	
Elizabethtown	Kentucky	WKZT-TV	23.4	
Hazard	Kentucky	WKHA	35.4	
Lexington	Kentucky	WKLE	46.4	
Louisville	Kentucky	WKPC-TV	15.4	
Madisonville	Kentucky	WKMA-TV	35.4	
Morehead	Kentucky	WKMR	38.4	
Murray	Kentucky	WKMU	21.4	
Owensboro	Kentucky	WKOH	31.4	
Owenton	Kentucky	WKON	52.4	
Paducah	Kentucky	WKPD	29.4	
Pikeville	Kentucky	WKPI-TV	22.4	
Somerset	Kentucky	WKSO-TV	29.4	
Alexandria	Louisiana	KLPA-TV	25.2	
Baton Rouge	Louisiana	WLPB-TV	27.2	
Lafayette	Louisiana	KLPB-TV	24.2	
Lake Charles	Louisiana	KLTL-TV	24.2	
Monroe	Louisiana	KLTM-TV	13.2	
New Orleans	Louisiana	WYES-TV	12.4	
Shreveport	Louisiana	KLTS-TV	24.2	
Boston	Massachusetts	WGBX-TV	44.4	
Springfield	Massachusetts	WGBY-TV	57.3	
Annapolis	Maryland	WMPT	22.3	
Baltimore	Maryland	WMPB	67.3	
Frederick	Maryland	WFPT	62.3	
Hagerstown	Maryland	WWPB	31.3	
Oakland	Maryland	WGPT	36.3	
Salisbury	Maryland	WCPB	28.3	
Augusta	Maine	WCBB	10.4	
Biddeford–Portland	Maine	WMEA-TV	26.4	
Calais	Maine	WMED-TV	13.4	
Orono–Bangor	Maine	WMEB-TV	12.4	
Presque Isle	Maine	WMEM-TV	10.4	
Alpena	Michigan	WCML	6.2	
Bad Axe	Michigan	WDCQ-TV	19.4	
Cadillac	Michigan	WCMV	27.2	
Detroit	Michigan	WTVS	56.2	
East Lansing	Michigan	WKAR-TV	23.4	
Grand Rapids	Michigan	WGVU-TV	35.5	
Kalamazoo	Michigan	WGVK	52.5	
Marquette	Michigan	WNMU	13.2	
Mount Pleasant–Bay City	Michigan	WCMU-TV	26.2	
Austin, Minnesota	Minnesota	KSMQ-TV	15.4	
Appleton	Minnesota	KWCM-TV	10.5	
Bemidji	Minnesota	KAWE	9.3	
Brainerd	Minnesota	KAWB	22.3	
Crookston	Minnesota	KCGE-DT	16.4	
St. Paul	Minnesota	KTCA-TV	2.4	
Worthington	Minnesota	KSMN	20.5	
Biloxi	Mississippi	WMAH-TV	19.2	
Booneville	Mississippi	WMAE-TV	12.2	
Bude	Mississippi	WMAU-TV	17.2	
Columbia	Mississippi	W45AA-D	45.2	
Greenwood	Mississippi	WMAO-TV	23.2	
Jackson	Mississippi	WMPN-TV	29.2	
Meridian	Mississippi	WMAW-TV	14.2	
Mississippi State	Mississippi	WMAB-TV	2.2	
Oxford	Mississippi	WMAV-TV	18.2	
Joplin	Missouri	KOZJ	26.2	
Springfield	Missouri	KOZK	21.2	
Kansas City	Missouri	KCPT	19.4	
Sedalia	Missouri	KMOS-TV	6.4	
St. Louis	Missouri	KETC	9.2	
Billings	Montana	KBGS-TV	16.2	
Bozeman	Montana	KUSM-TV	9.2	
Helena	Montana	KUHM-TV	10.2	
Kalispell	Montana	KUKL-TV	46.2	
Missoula	Montana	KUFM-TV	11.2	
Alliance	Nebraska	KTNE-TV	13.4	
Bassett	Nebraska	KMNE-TV	7.4	
Hastings	Nebraska	KHNE-TV	29.4	
Lexington	Nebraska	KLNE-TV	3.4	
Lincoln	Nebraska	KUON-TV	12.4	
Merriman	Nebraska	KRNE-TV	12.4	
Norfolk	Nebraska	KXNE-TV	19.4	
North Platte	Nebraska	KPNE-TV	9.4	
Omaha	Nebraska	KYNE-TV	26.4	
Las Vegas	Nevada	KLVX	10.3	
Reno	Nevada	KNPB	5.3	
Albuquerque	New Mexico	KNME-TV	5.2	
Las Cruces	New Mexico	KRWG-TV	22.3	
Portales	New Mexico	KENW	3.3	
Albany–Schenectady	New York	WMHT	17.4	
Binghamton	New York	WSKG-TV	46.6	
Corning	New York	WSKA	30.6	
Buffalo	New York	WNED-TV	17.3	
New York City	New York	WNET	13.2	
Norwood	New York	WNPI-DT	18.4	
Plattsburgh	New York	WCFE-TV	57.3	
Rochester	New York	WXXI-TV	21.4	
Syracuse	New York	WCNY-TV	24.4	
Watertown	New York	WPBS-TV	16.4	
Asheville	North Carolina	WUNF-TV	33.2	
Canton	North Carolina	WUNW	27.3	
Chapel Hill	North Carolina	WUNC-TV	4.2	
Concord	North Carolina	WUNG-TV	58.2	
Edenton	North Carolina	WUND-TV	2.2	
Greenville	North Carolina	WUNK-TV	25.2	
Jacksonville	North Carolina	WUNM-TV	19.3	
Linville	North Carolina	WUNE-TV	17.3	
Lumberton	North Carolina	WUNU	31.2	
Roanoke Rapids	North Carolina	WUNP-TV	36.3	
Wilmington	North Carolina	WUNJ-TV	39.2	
Winston-Salem	North Carolina	WUNL-TV	26.2	
Bismarck	North Dakota	KBME-TV	3.4	
Devils Lake	North Dakota	KMDE	25.4	
Dickinson	North Dakota	KDSE	9.4	
Ellendale	North Dakota	KJRE	19.4	
Fargo	North Dakota	KFME	13.4	
Minot	North Dakota	KSRE	6.4	
Williston	North Dakota	KWSE	4.4	
Athens	Ohio	WOUB-TV	44.6	
Bowling Green	Ohio	WBGU-TV	27.2	
Cleveland	Ohio	WVIZ	25.5	
Columbus	Ohio	WOSU-TV	34.4	
Portsmouth	Ohio	WPBO-TV	42.4	
Dayton	Ohio	WPTD	16.5	
Oxford	Ohio	WPTO	14.3	
Toledo	Ohio	WGTE-TV	30.2	
Cheyenne	Oklahoma	KWET	12.4	
Eufaula	Oklahoma	KOET	3.4	
Oklahoma City	Oklahoma	KETA-TV	13.4	
Tulsa	Oklahoma	KOED-TV	11.4	
Bend	Oregon	KOAB-TV	11.3	
Corvallis	Oregon	KOAC-TV	7.3	
Eugene	Oregon	KEPB-TV	29.3	
La Grande	Oregon	KTVR	13.3	
Portland	Oregon	KOPB-TV	10.3	
Clearfield	Pennsylvania	WPSU-TV	3.4	
Harrisburg	Pennsylvania	WITF-TV	33.2	
Philadelphia	Pennsylvania	WHYY	12.3	
Pittsburgh	Pennsylvania	WQED	13.5	
Scranton	Pennsylvania	WVIA-TV	44.2	
Fajardo	Puerto Rico	WMTJ	40.2	
Ponce	Puerto Rico	WQTO	26.2	
Allendale	South Carolina	WEBA-TV	14.4	
Beaufort	South Carolina	WJWJ-TV	16.4	
Charleston	South Carolina	WITV	7.4	
Columbia	South Carolina	WRLK-TV	35.4	
Conway	South Carolina	WHMC	23.4	
Florence	South Carolina	WJPM-TV	33.4	
Greenville	South Carolina	WNTV	29.4	
Greenwood	South Carolina	WNEH	38.4	
Rock Hill	South Carolina	WNSC-TV	30.4	
Spartanburg	South Carolina	WRET-TV	49.4	
Sumter	South Carolina	WRJA-TV	27.4	
Aberdeen	South Dakota	KDSD-TV	16.4	
Brookings	South Dakota	KESD-TV	8.4	
Eagle Butte	South Dakota	KPSD-TV	13.4	
Lowry	South Dakota	KQSD-TV	11.4	
Martin	South Dakota	KZSD-TV	8.4	
Pierre	South Dakota	KTSD-TV	10.4	
Rapid City	South Dakota	KBHE-TV	9.4	
Sioux Falls	South Dakota	KCSD-TV	23.4	
Vermillion	South Dakota	KUSD-TV	2.4	
Chattanooga	Tennessee	WTCI	45.3	
Cookeville	Tennessee	WCTE	22.4	
Knoxville	Tennessee	WKOP-TV	15.2	
Lexington–Jackson	Tennessee	WLJT	11.2	
Memphis	Tennessee	WKNO	10.3	
Nashville	Tennessee	WNPT-TV	8.3	
Sneedville	Tennessee	WETP-TV	2.2	
Amarillo	Texas	KACV-TV	2.2	
Austin	Texas	KLRU	18.4	
College Station	Texas	KAMU-TV	12.3	
Dallas	Texas	KERA-TV	13.2	
El Paso	Texas	KCOS (TV)	13.3	
Houston	Texas	KUHT	8.3	
Lubbock	Texas	KTTZ-TV	5.3	
Odessa	Texas	KPBT-TV	36.2	
San Antonio	KLRN	9.3		
Salt Lake City	Utah	KUED	7.3	
St. George	Utah	KUEW	18.3	
Hampton–Norfolk	Virginia	WHRO-TV	15.3	
Roanoke	Virginia	WBRA-TV	15.3	
Charlotte Amalie	U.S. Virgin Islands	WTJX-TV	12.2	
Burlington	Vermont	WETK	33.4	
Rutland	Vermont	WVER	28.4	
St. Johnsbury	Vermont	WVTB	20.4	
Windsor	Vermont	WVTA	41.4	
Seattle	Washington	KCTS-TV	9.2	
Yakima	Washington	KYVE	47.2	
Spokane	Washington	KSPS-TV	7.4	
Green Bay	Wisconsin	WPNE-TV	38.4	
La Crosse	Wisconsin	WHLA-TV	31.4	
Madison	Wisconsin	WHA-TV	21.4	
Menomonie	Wisconsin	WHWC-TV	28.4	
Park Falls	Wisconsin	WLEF-TV	36.4	
Wausau	Wisconsin	WHRM-TV	20.4	
Milwaukee	Wisconsin	WMVS	10.3	
Grandview	West Virginia	WSWP-TV	9.3	
Huntington	West Virginia	WVPB-TV	33.3	
Morgantown	West Virginia	WNPB-TV	24.3	
Casper	Wyoming	KPTW	6.3	
Lander	Wyoming	KCWC-DT	4.3	
Laramie–Cheyenne	Wyoming	KWYP-DT	8.3	
