= WETP-TV =

Television station in Sneedville, Tennessee

WETP-TV and WKOP-TV

WETP-TV: Sneedville–Johnson City–Kingsport–; Bristol, Tennessee; WKOP-TV: Knoxville, Tennessee; United States
- Channels for WETP-TV: Digital: 24 (UHF); Virtual: 2
- Channels for WKOP-TV: Digital: 29 (UHF); Virtual: 15
- Branding: East Tennessee PBS

Programming
- Affiliations: 2.1/15.1: PBS; for others, see § Subchannels

Ownership
- Owner: East Tennessee Public Communications Corporation

History
- First air date: WETP-TV: March 20, 1967; WKOP-TV: August 15, 1990
- Former call signs: WETP-TV: WSJK-TV (1967–1979); WSJK (1979–2003)
- Former channel number: WETP-TV: Analog: 2 (VHF, 1967–2009); Digital: 41 (UHF, 2000–2019); WKOP-TV: Analog: 15 (UHF, 1990–2008); Digital: 17 (UHF, 2003–2019)
- Former affiliations: NET (1967–1970)
- Call sign meaning: WETP-TV: East Tennessee Public Television; WKOP-TV: Knoxville's Own Public Television

Technical information
- Licensing authority: FCC
- Facility ID: WETP-TV: 18252; WKOP-TV: 18267
- ERP: WETP-TV: 313 kW; WKOP-TV: 146 kW
- HAAT: WETP-TV: 566.9 m (1,860 ft); WKOP-TV: 551.3 m (1,809 ft)
- Transmitter coordinates: WETP-TV: 36°22′52.3″N 83°10′48.8″W; WKOP-TV: 35°59′44.4″N 83°57′23.1″W

Links
- Public license information: WETP-TV: Public file; LMS; WKOP-TV: Public file; LMS
- Website: www.easttennesseepbs.org

WETP-TV (channel 2) and WKOP-TV (channel 15), together branded as East Tennessee PBS, are public television stations serving Knoxville and the Tri-Cities in East Tennessee, United States. The stations are owned by the East Tennessee Public Communications Corporation and broadcast from studios and offices on East Magnolia Avenue in downtown Knoxville. WETP-TV, licensed to Sneedville, Tennessee, is broadcast from a transmitter atop Short Mountain near Mooresburg, while WKOP-TV's transmitter is situated on Sharp's Ridge in North Knoxville.

Channel 2 began broadcasting on March 20, 1967, as WSJK-TV. It was the first in what would ultimately be four stations opened by the Tennessee Department of Education to extend educational television service beyond the cities of Memphis and Nashville. The station's assignment to Sneedville was necessary in order to use VHF channel 2, also allotted to Nashville and Atlanta; however, this resulted in middling reception in Knoxville and the Tri-Cities. WSJK-TV programs originated from studios in Knoxville and Johnson City, though the Johnson City studios diminished in importance and ultimately closed in 1980.

In the early 1980s, a controversy about the production of a film seen as too favorable to governor Lamar Alexander led to scrutiny of Tennessee's state-owned public television stations. Internal and external reports found the system to be inequitable in funding. The state of Tennessee exited public broadcasting with the Tennessee Educational Television Network Act of 1981 and spun out its four stations, including WSJK-TV, to new community licensees in the years that followed. After years of planning, WKOP-TV began broadcasting in 1990 in order to improve the signal in Knoxville. WSJK-TV was renamed WETP-TV in 2003 as part of the launch of a new brand, East Tennessee Public Television, for the service; the stations became known as East Tennessee PBS in 2010. East Tennessee PBS produces a variety of regional programming in the areas of health, education, and culture.

== History ==
=== Early years ===
In 1953, officials with the Tennessee Educational Television Commission requested the assignment of several channels across the state for noncommercial educational use, including channel 2 in Sneedville, in addition to existing assignments for Memphis, Nashville, Knoxville, and Chattanooga. The Federal Communications Commission (FCC) granted the assignments in March 1954. The selection of Sneedville permitted the use of channel 2, as the transmitter had to be 190 miles (310 km) away from cities that had stations on the same channel, notably Nashville; Atlanta; and Greensboro, North Carolina.

Movement toward establishing a station first was made by the University of Tennessee (UT) in 1962. UT proposed a phased statewide network, with the first transmitters to be at Knoxville, Sneedville, and Chattanooga. At the time, educational television in East Tennessee was provided on commercial stations. The 1963 session of the Tennessee General Assembly authorized the Tennessee Department of Education to build TV stations to serve Memphis, Nashville, Chattanooga, and Knoxville and the Tri-Cities. The Metropolitan Educational Television Council then proposed to the state the establishment of the Sneedville station, to be fed by studios in Knoxville and Johnson City. The Department of Education then filed for channel 2 in February 1964; the state already had options on land near Sneedville for the transmitter site. The application reached the FCC on April 7, 1964, and was granted on June 2, 1965. The state selected the call sign WSJK-TV, representing Sneedville, Johnson City, and Knoxville. The 1965 Tennessee legislative session appropriated $1.75 million for educational TV construction, and a federal grant was also received for $512,000 in construction costs for channel 2.

Construction took place on Short Mountain in 1966 and early 1967. On the peak, a 499-foot (152 m) tower was constructed, as well as a transmitter facility complete with sleeping and cooking facilities in the event of an emergency. Meanwhile, work began to set up the two studios that would provide programs to channel 2 at the University of Tennessee in Knoxville and East Tennessee State University (ETSU) in Johnson City; an old band room in the basement of Neyland Stadium served as temporary quarters in Knoxville. However, WSJK-TV was held up by delays in designing, building, and approving the transmitter facility. The transmitter site was important because every program the Knoxville and Johnson City studios produced would have to be taped and taken to Sneedville for broadcast until microwave links could be established. The work was completed in early March 1967, when test patterns were broadcast from channel 2, while program service to a potential audience of 772 East Tennessee schools began with a music lesson on the morning of March 20. Two months later, the station began airing evening programs from National Educational Television, which was supplanted by PBS in 1970.

The Department of Education network grew from one station to four over the next twelve years. In February 1968, WLJT in Lexington was completed; this station served to rebroadcast WKNO in Memphis. WTCI in Chattanooga began in March 1970, while the last station in the set, WCTE, was brought into service in August 1978.

In 1970, the Department of Education applied to establish a microwave link from the Knoxville studio to Sneedville. Beginning the next year, Knoxville served as the station's primary origination point. This proved to reduce the role of Johnson City programming on channel 2; by 1980, only an hour a week was originating there, a public affairs show and a student-produced program. WSJK-TV proved a high-volume producer of educational programming and at one point in 1975 had more local shows in production than any other public television station in the United States. In the 1970s, the station also began airing Tennessee Volunteers men's basketball games.

=== Proposals for additional transmitters ===
The Tri-Cities sat at the edge of the channel 2 coverage area, and in the late 1970s, there was some interest from multiple groups as to establishing a station on Johnson City's reserved channel 41 to be operated with the ETSU studio. This was seen as a possible counterweight to the increasingly Knoxville-based WSJK-TV. In March 1977, the Department of Education filed for the construction permit. A second group, Broadside TV, also filed for the channel but did not propose instructional and public programming. Even as the state filed its application, however, staff cuts were made at the ETSU studio. Commercial station WKPT-TV in Kingsport proposed funding much of the construction cost of channel 41 in 1981, but in exchange, it wanted to use channel 2 to rebroadcast WKPT. One executive in the Department of Education told an Associated Press reporter that he felt the proposed swap would have provided more benefit to WKPT than to the public.

On the other edge of the coverage area was Knoxville. As early as 1974, the Department of Education filed for channel 15 there. However, no movement was made until 1978. Commercial station WBIR-TV was analyzing building a new tower on Sharp's Ridge and offering space for channel 15 to be located there as well. Even though the Department of Education agreed to pay for space on the mast, a budget crunch led to the reallocation of funds away from the project.

=== From state to community ownership ===
In 1980, WSJK-TV was at the center of a controversy whose effects would change the course of educational television in much of Tennessee. The year before, general manager Al Curtis had produced a 30-minute documentary on the successful 1978 gubernatorial campaign of Republican Lamar Alexander, The Extra Mile. The film used his campaign theme song, and most of the source footage was shot by a consulting firm for his campaign. The consultant, Doug Bailey, noted he had input in the production of the program. Gene Dietz, a Democrat and head of the state network, denied Curtis permission to broadcast the program. At the time, Curtis was in line to succeed Dietz. However, when the issue came to light, state education commissioner Ed Cox abolished the position and began a formal audit. Dietz described his firing as politically motivated and called the rejected program "pure political propaganda".

This controversy led the state comptroller to audit the state educational television system, and Governor Alexander asked the Finance Department to evaluate the program. In April, it recommended all the stations be spun out to local community control and that the Johnson City studios be closed. The report criticized the heavy bias in favor of state-owned stations in funding decisions, which disadvantaged the community-owned stations (WKNO in Memphis and WDCN in Nashville). A separate inquiry into the educational television system, produced by consultant Donald Mullally for the Tennessee Higher Education Commission, returned its findings in July. Citing underfunding compared to state networks in other Southern states and the same inequities found in the Finance Department report, it too called for the state educational television apparatus to be disbanded, WSJK-TV to be spun out to community control, and the Johnson City studios to be closed. It also proposed that the Memphis and Nashville stations absorb WLJT and WCTE, respectively. One expansion the Mullally report enthusiastically recommended was the addition of channel 15 for Knoxville. The report noted that reception difficulties had led Knox County schools to virtually abandon use of educational television and deemed the construction of a new transmitter "necessary" to provide a quality signal and a self-sustaining community service in Knoxville.

The recommendations of the Finance Department and the Mullally report were taken up heartily by legislators. In September 1980, the nine employees in Johnson City were laid off, and the state moved all the equipment to WCTE in Cookeville; that station, which had never had its own studios since going on air, reportedly needed production facilities to qualify for grants from the Corporation for Public Broadcasting. The Johnson City studio was already being used to supply production services and station identifications for WCTE.

In April 1981, the Tennessee legislature passed the Tennessee Educational Television Network Act of 1981, which was signed by Governor Alexander in May. This legislation provided for the transfer of the four Department of Education-owned stations to community entities by 1986 and authorized negotiations as to channel 41 to continue.

The East Tennessee Public Communications Council was created as an 18-member community board in 1983 to assume WSJK-TV from the state. The Department of Education stipulated that no more than 10 members of the board could come from Knox County. The FCC authorized the transfer in August 1983, and it was completed in early October, making WSJK-TV the first of the Department of Education stations to be transferred out of state control.

The early 1980s also saw two key milestones for the station. In 1981, WSJK-TV conducted its first on-air fundraising drive. The next year, it was the provider of on-site video services at the 1982 World's Fair in Knoxville; it received a $900,000 mobile production unit donated by Philips, which the station retained after the fair. The mobile unit was hired out for productions, providing WSJK-TV an additional source of revenue.

=== A Knoxville station, at last ===
After the state divested itself of WSJK-TV, the East Tennessee Public Communications Council began focusing on building channel 15 in Knoxville. In January 1986, it applied to the FCC for a construction permit for the second station. The additional facility would provide city-grade coverage of Knoxville. However, two other groups also filed for new noncommercial stations. Lincoln Memorial University in Harrogate, which was developing a communications curriculum, and Knoxville Community Broadcasting Corporation, which proposed a station featuring secular and religious programs, each presented proposals to the FCC. This required the commission to designate a comparative hearing, which was unusual for a reserved channel. In February 1987, an FCC administrative law judge awarded the channel to the East Tennessee Public Communications Council on the strength of its more detailed application. Ultimately, it induced the withdrawal of the other two applications by offering Lincoln Memorial University 30 minutes of programming a week and reimbursing Knoxville Community Broadcasting for its expenses. On August 15, 1990, WKOP-TV—"Knoxville's Own Public Television"—began broadcasting from the WBIR-TV tower on Sharp's Ridge.

The state of Tennessee eliminated more than $780,000 of funding for WSJK–WKOP in 1991, representing the loss of a third of the stations' budget. The station responded by cutting all instructional and daytime broadcasting, beginning its broadcast day at 3 p.m. instead of 7:15 a.m. In 1993, the station's facilities moved off the UT campus and to an office building on East Magnolia Avenue after UT needed the space in the Communications Building for its own use. In 1997, Al Curtis retired; he had worked for WSJK–WKOP since its sign-on in 1966 and served as general manager since 1969.

=== Rebrands and digitalization ===
On February 1, 2003, WSJK-TV became WETP-TV (East Tennessee Public), and the stations rebranded as East Tennessee Public Television. One of the reasons for the change was confusion between community access television and public television. The stations became known as East Tennessee PBS in August 2010.

The 2000s also saw the digitalization of WETP-TV and WKOP-TV. WKOP-TV began digital broadcasting by May 2003, sharing a new 1,400-foot (430 m) mast on Sharp's Ridge with WVLT-TV and WUOT radio. The two stations then discontinued analog broadcasting several years later. WKOP-TV in Knoxville switched on June 12; WETP-TV stuck with the original digital transition date of February 17, 2009. Both stations continued broadcasting on their pre-transition digital channel assignments, WETP-TV on channel 41 and WKOP-TV on channel 17; the stations were repacked to channel 24 and 29, respectively, in 2019 as a result of the 2016 United States wireless spectrum auction.

== Local programming ==
East Tennessee PBS produces a range of programs on local and regional interests. Among these are the monthly Up Close with Frank Murphy and weekly Tennessee Life. Historical programs in this genre included Omni and ET Horizons with Chris Williams. The station produces a number of health-related programs, including Yoga Basics with Patty, Fit & Fun with Missy Kane, and The Dr. Bob Show. The latter began as a health segment on WBIR-TV's Live at Five before becoming its own half-hour program, remaining in production until host Dr. Robert Overholt's death in June 2024.

One of the station's longest-running programs is Scholars' Bowl, a regional high school quiz tournament that first began airing in January 1985. The tournament, in continued production, had 59 teams in its 2022–2023 edition.

In 1990, Riders of the Silver Screen, a show featuring old Western movies, moved to WSJK–WKOP; the show had previously debuted on WKCH-TV in February 1984 before airing on WTVK/WKXT-TV from August 1988 to 1990. The show remained in production until June 2023, when host "Marshal" Andy Smalls retired.

== Subchannels ==
WETP-TV is broadcast from a transmitter atop Short Mountain near Mooresburg, while WKOP-TV's transmitter is situated on Sharp's Ridge in North Knoxville. The stations' signals are multiplexed:

Subchannels of WETP-TV and WKOP-TV
Subchannel		Res.	Short name		Programming
WETP-TV	WKOP-TV	Res.	WETP-TV	WKOP-TV	Programming
2.1	15.1	1080i	WETP-HD	WKOP-HD	PBS
2.2	15.2	480i	Kids		PBS Kids
2.3	15.3	480i	Create		Create
2.4	15.4	480i	World		World
