= Marfa Public Radio =

Public radio network in west Texas, United States

KRTS
- Marfa, Texas; United States
- Broadcast area: Far West Texas
- Frequency: 93.5 MHz
- Branding: Marfa Public Radio

Programming
- Format: Public radio
- Affiliations: National Public Radio, Public Radio International

Ownership
- Owner: Marfa Public Radio Corporation
- Sister stations: KXWT

History
- First air date: 2007
- Call sign meaning: Given to station when KRTS calls were abandoned by 92.1 FM in Houston which was once branded on air as "K-Arts"

Technical information
- Licensing authority: FCC
- Facility ID: 164217
- Class: C1
- ERP: 33,000 watts
- HAAT: 446 meters
- Transmitter coordinates: 30°33′50.00″N 104°9′45.00″W

Links
- Public license information: Public file; LMS
- Webcast: Live feed
- Website: Marfa Public Radio

Marfa Public Radio is a network of public radio stations serving the Big Bend region of Far West Texas. Headquartered on East San Antonio Street in Marfa, Texas. The station has been a member of National Public Radio since 2006.

Marfa Public Radio broadcasts on four frequencies in the Big Bend–flagship KRTS 93.5 FM in Marfa and full-time satellites KRTP 91.7 FM in Alpine, KDKY 91.5 FM in Marathon, and KOJP 95.3 FM in Presidio. Marfa Public Radio also operates KXWT, the NPR member for Odessa, Midland and the Permian Basin. The station features news and talk programming from NPR, plus local affairs and original music programs from the Big Bend.

== History ==
In 2010/2011, approximately half of the station's budget came from the CPB. The station came into its own in 2011, when the Rock House fire broke out during its spring pledge drive. For the next three weeks, the station was a vital source of information about weather conditions, road conditions and evacuations. That coverage played a role in the pledge drive being the most successful in the station's history up to that point. It has since received significant support from across Texas, enabling it to hire a full-time news staff for the first time.

== Gallery ==
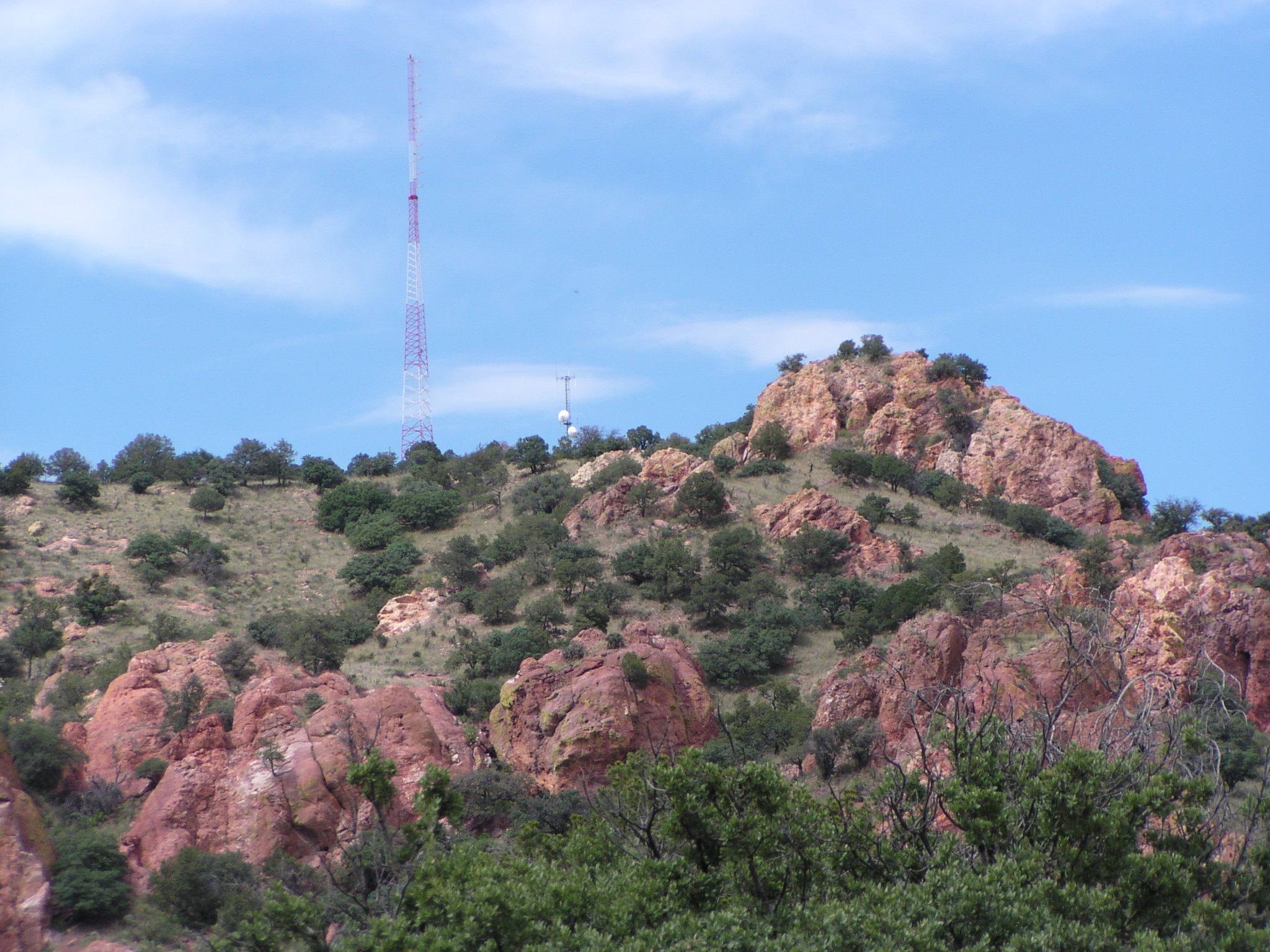
KRTS's mountaintop transmitter site in the Davis Mountains.

== See also ==
- List of community radio stations in the United States
