= World Channel =

American digital multicast public television network (launched 2005)

- Country: United States
- Broadcast area: Nationwide

Programming
- Language: English
- Picture format: 1080i (HDTV); 720p (HDTV); 480i (SDTV) 16:9 widescreen or 4:3 letterbox

Ownership
- Owner: American Public Television; The WNET Group; WGBH Educational Foundation; National Educational Telecommunications Association
- Sister channels: Create

History
- Launched: 2005; 21 years ago (select cities); 2007; 19 years ago (nationwide)

Links
- Website: Official website

Availability

Terrestrial
- Digital terrestrial television: Channel slots vary in each city

World Channel, also branded as World (stylized as WORLD), is an American digital multicast public television network owned and operated by the WGBH Educational Foundation. It is distributed by American Public Television and the National Educational Telecommunications Association and features programming covering topics such as science, nature, news, and public affairs. Programming is supplied by the entities, as well as other partners such as WNET and WGBH. It is primarily carried on the digital subchannels of PBS member stations.

== History ==
In 2004, the John S. and James L. Knight Foundation granted PBS funds to develop a public affairs network, Public Square, given the change in broadcasting to digital thus allowing stations to broadcast multiple channels. (Public Square was also a name previous given to a proposed civic series in early 2000s.) The Knight Foundation announced a challenge grant to PBS to launch this network on December 14, 2004 at the Digital Futures Initiative Summit. PBS would have to raise double the grant amount to get the foundation's grant. Additional, the foundation made a grant to PBS for the first program's pilot slated for the network. The program, Global Watch, was to be co-produced by KCET and KQED. The pilot aired on PBS' National Program Service, while the series would only continue on Public Square. PBS was also discussing with WGBH and WNET to fold Public Square and World together.

Logo used from 2012 to 2023.

Work on World started in 2004, and by December 2005, its founding stations started broadcasting World on a digital subchannel. KQED started broadcasting its own similar channel before April 2005 as well. WGBH and WNET teamed up with PBS to roll out a national version of the local channels as World. The stations applied to air programming and PBS was used to distribute the network. The network was launched nationally on August 15, 2007. For the first year, the Ford Foundation funded the company's investments' cost, and PBS contributed some funding from its own revenue-generating activities. By March 2009, the network lacked enough coverage to secure an underwriter, and on July 1, 2009, PBS withdrew from the channel. By September 2009, with the sole exception of ITVS Global Voices, all the other channels left network.

An overhaul of the network was in the works as of September 8, 2009. The Corporation for Public Broadcasting (CPB) funded R&D for the relaunch and covered costs so stations would not have to pay the license until June 2011. The network was relaunched in July 2010, with the revamped website slated for more of a roll-out on July 1. The relaunch would also draw in stations as digital tier channels and face more cable subscribers. Nielsen ratings improved using more of the channel bandwidth so as to forestall any FCC attempts to reduce the existing allocated bandwidth.

The relaunched service planned to target more diverse audiences with a median age of 36. The revamped World had a monthly theme for coherence and personality to create online action and buzz. The channel expanded its scope of program offerings, such as reviewing archives, film festivals, indie producer hubs, public radio, Independent Television Service, Link TV, MiND TV, Minority Consortia, New American Media, the Sundance Institute, and Youth Media International.

The channel used a new low-cost collaborative model where the channel would offer distribution services, but in return for which producers would be individually responsible for securing funding.

In September 2011, a new general manager, Elizabeth Cheng, for the network was hired.

United States budget sequestration in 2013 led to a temporary reduction in CPB's budget. To help mitigate the cuts, CPB redirected some funds towards the World network, specifically in the amount of US$750,000 (equivalent to $1,036,607 in 2025), that had been earmarked for the National Minority Consortia.

== Operations ==
The network is available to stations that are members of APT and NETA (formerly available to PBS's National Program Service subscribers and PBS Plus members). Affiliation fees of 4 levels from $5,500 to $32,000 a year which only cover 50% of the channel's cost. Many member stations with limited channel capacity usually carry the network in a 50/50 split with Create (as both networks maintain looping schedules). Cost are kept down as the channel uses rights and content previously available. Programming has come from PBS, NETA, APT and ITVS International.

== Programs ==
World shows a core three-hour documentary block four times a day with other programs circulate in the other 12 hours. This gives viewers increased chances to see a program, which might be shown from 4 to 8 times a week.

Stations may also choose to place their own programming, such as local government hearings and events, on their subchannel at local discretion.

As of 1 January 2021, the current programming is:

- AfroPoP: The Ultimate Cultural Exchange
- America ReFramed
- BBC News
- DW News
- The Day
- NHK Newsline
- Doc World
- Local, USA
- Stories from the Stage

=== Public Square programming block ===
- Global Watch

== Affiliates ==
World is carried by the following stations:

City	State/District	Station	Channel
Birmingham	Alabama	WBIQ	10.4
Demopolis	Alabama	WIIQ	41.4
Dozier	Alabama	WDIQ	2.4
Florence	Alabama	WFIQ	36.4
Huntsville	Alabama	WHIQ	25.4
Louisville	Alabama	WGIQ	43.4
Mobile	Alabama	WEIQ	42.4
Montgomery	Alabama	WAIQ	26.4
Mount Cheaha	Alabama	WCIQ	7.4
Fairbanks	Alaska	KUAC-TV	9.2
Arkadelphia	Arkansas	KETG	9.4
El Dorado	Arkansas	KETZ	12.4
Fayetteville	Arkansas	KAFT	13.4
Jonesboro	Arkansas	KTEJ	19.4
Little Rock	Arkansas	KETS	2.4
Mountain View	Arkansas	KEMV	6.4
Phoenix	Arizona	KAET	8.3
Tucson	Arizona	KUAT-TV	6.3
Tucson	Arizona	KUAS-TV	27.3
Eureka	California	KEET	13.2
Fresno	California	KVPT	18.4
Huntington Beach	California	KOCE-TV	50.4
Redding	California	KIXE-TV	9.3
Sacramento	California	KVIE	6.3
San Diego	California	KPBS	15.2
San Francisco	California	KQED	9.3
Watsonville	California	KQET	25.3
San Jose	California	KQEH	54.3
Wilmington	Delaware	WHYY-TV	12.2
Washington	District of Columbia	WETA-TV	26.4
Fort Myers	Florida	WGCU	30.2
Gainesville	Florida	WUFT	5.3
Jacksonville	Florida	WJCT	7.3
Orlando	Florida	WUCF-TV	24.5
Tampa	Florida	WEDU	3.3
West Palm Beach	Florida	WXEL-TV	42.2
Athens/Atlanta	Georgia	WGTV	8.3
Chatsworth	Georgia	WNGH-TV	18.3
Cochran	Georgia	WMUM-TV	29.3
Columbus	Georgia	WJSP-TV	28.3
Dawson	Georgia	WACS-TV	25.3
Pelham	Georgia	WABW-TV	14.3
Savannah	Georgia	WVAN-TV	9.3
Waycross	Georgia	WXGA-TV	8.3
Wrens	Georgia	WCES-TV	20.3
Boise	Idaho	KAID	4.4
Coeur d'Alene	Idaho	KCDT	26.4
Moscow	Idaho	KUID-TV	12.4
Pocatello	Idaho	KISU-TV	10.4
Twin Falls	Idaho	KIPT	13.4
Carbondale	Illinois	WSIU-TV	8.2
Jacksonville	Illinois	WSEC	14.2
Macomb	Illinois	WMEC	22.2
Olney	Illinois	WUSI-TV	19.2
Peoria	Illinois	WTVP	47.3
Quincy	Illinois	WQEC	27.2
Urbana	Illinois	WILL-TV	12.3
Bloomington	Indiana	WTIU	30.2
Fort Wayne	Indiana	WFWA	39.4
Council Bluffs	Iowa	KBIN-TV	3.3
Davenport	Iowa	KQIN	36.3
Des Moines	Iowa	KDIN-TV	11.3
Fort Dodge	Iowa	KTIN	21.3
Iowa City	Iowa	KIIN	12.3
Mason City	Iowa	KYIN	24.3
Red Oak	Iowa	KHIN	36.3
Sioux City	Iowa	KSIN-TV	27.3
Waterloo	Iowa	KRIN	32.3
Covington	Kentucky	WCVN-TV	54.5
Topeka	Kansas	KTWU	11.2
New Orleans	Louisiana	WYES-TV	12.2
Boston	Massachusetts	WGBX-TV	2.2
Springfield	Massachusetts	WGBY-TV	57.2
Augusta	Maine	WCBB	10.3
Biddeford	Maine	WMEA-TV	26.3
Calais	Maine	WMED-TV	13.3
Orono	Maine	WMEB-TV	12.3
Presque Isle	Maine	WMEM-TV	10.3
Grand Rapids	Michigan	WGVU-TV	35.4
Kalamazoo	Michigan	WGVK	52.4
Detroit	Michigan	WTVS	56.4
East Lansing	Michigan	WKAR-TV	23.2
East Central Michigan	Michigan	WDCQ-TV	19.2
Appleton	Minnesota	KWCM-TV	10.4
Crookston	Minnesota	KCGE-DT	16.2
Duluth	Minnesota	WDSE	8.2
Hibbing	Minnesota	WRPT	31.2
Worthington	Minnesota	KSMN	20.4
St. Louis	Missouri	KETC	9.3
Springfield	Missouri	KOZK	21.4
Joplin	Missouri	KOZJ	26.4
Billings	Montana	KBGS-TV	16.4
Bozeman	Montana	KUSM-TV	9.4
Fort Peck	Montana	K45CH-D	45.2
Helena	Montana	KUHM-TV	10.4
Kalispell	Montana	KUKL-TV	46.4
Missoula	Montana	KUFM-TV	11.4
Alliance	Nebraska	KTNE-TV	13.2
Bassett	Nebraska	KMNE-TV	7.2
Hastings	Nebraska	KHNE-TV	29.2
Lexington	Nebraska	KLNE-TV	3.2
Lincoln	Nebraska	KUON-TV	12.2
Merriman	Nebraska	KRNE-TV	12.2
Norfolk	Nebraska	KXNE-TV	19.2
North Platte	Nebraska	KPNE-TV	9.2
Omaha	Nebraska	KYNE-TV	26.2
Las Vegas	Nevada	KLVX	10.4
Durham	New Hampshire	WENH-TV	11.3
Kenne		WEKW-TV	18.3
Littleton		WLED-TV	23.3
Albuquerque	New Mexico	KNMD-TV	9.1
Albuquerque	New Mexico	KNME-TV	5.4
Las Cruces	New Mexico	KRWG-TV	22.2
Binghamton	New York	WSKG-TV	46.4
Corning	New York	WSKA	30.4
Garden City	New York	WLIW	21.3
Norwood	New York	WNPI-DT	18.3
Rochester	New York	WXXI-TV	21.2
Schenectady	New York	WMHT	17.3
Watertown	New York	WPBS-TV	16.3
Bismarck	North Dakota	KBME-TV	3.2
Devils Lake	North Dakota	KMDE	25.2
Dickinson	North Dakota	KDSE	9.2
Ellendale	North Dakota	KJRE	19.2
Fargo	North Dakota	KFME	13.2
Minot	North Dakota	KSRE	6.2
Williston	North Dakota	KWSE	4.2
Cambridge	Ohio	WOUC-TV	44.3
Cleveland	Ohio	WVIZ	25.3
Dayton	Ohio	WPTD	16.3
Oklahoma City	Oklahoma	KETA-TV	13.2
Eufaula	Oklahoma	KOET	3.2
Tulsa	Oklahoma	KOED-TV	11.2
Cheyenne	Oklahoma	KWET-TV	12.2
Klamath Falls	Oregon	KFTS	22.2
Medford	Oregon	KSYS	8.2
Portland	Oregon	KOPB-TV	10.2
Corvallis	Oregon	KOAC-TV	7.2
Eugene	Oregon	KEPB-TV	28.2
Bend	Oregon	KOAB-TV	3.2
La Grande	Oregon	KTVR	13.2
Allentown	Pennsylvania	WPPT	35.2
Clearfield	Pennsylvania	WPSU-TV	3.3
Erie	Pennsylvania	WQLN	54.3
Pittsburgh	Pennsylvania	WQED	13.3
Aberdeen	South Dakota	KDSD-TV	16.2
Brookings	South Dakota	KESD-TV	8.2
Eagle Butte	South Dakota	KPSD-TV	13.2
Lowry	South Dakota	KQSD-TV	11.2
Martin	South Dakota	KZSD-TV	8.2
Pierre	South Dakota	KTSD-TV	10.2
Rapid City	South Dakota	KBHE-TV	9.2
Sioux Falls	South Dakota	KCSD-TV	23.2
Vermillion	South Dakota	KUSD-TV	2.2
Cookeville	Tennessee	WCTE	22.2
Memphis	Tennessee	WKNO	10.2
Knoxville	Tennessee	WKOP-TV	15.4
Nashville	Tennessee	WNPT	8.2
Sneedville	Tennessee	WETP-TV	2.4
Austin	Texas	KLRU	18.3
Dallas	Texas	KERA-TV	13.4
Houston	Texas	KUHT	8.4
San Antonio	Texas	KLRN	9.2
Salt Lake City	Utah	KUED	7.2
St. George	Utah	KUES	19.2
St. George, Utah	Utah	KUEW	18.2
Charlottesville	Virginia	WNVC	41.3
Charlottesville	Virginia	WCVW-TV	57.5
Hampton-Norfolk	Virginia	WHRO-TV	15.2
Richmond	Virginia	WNVT	23.3
Roanoke	Virginia	WBRA-TV	15.2
Staunton	Virginia	WVPT	51.5
Burlington	Vermont	WETK	33.2
Rutland	Vermont	WVER	28.2
St. Johnsbury	Vermont	WVTB	20.2
Windsor	Vermont	WVTA	41.2
Spokane	Washington	KSPS-TV	7.2
Seattle	Washington	KCTS-TV	9.4
Richland	Washington	KTNW	31.3
Yakima	Washington	KYVE	47.4
Grandview	West Virginia	WSWP-TV	9.2
Huntington	West Virginia	WVPB-TV	33.2
Morgantown	West Virginia	WNPB-TV	24.2
Milwaukee	Wisconsin	WMVS	10.2
