= WWWN =

WWWN may refer to:

- WWWN-LD, a low-power television station (channel 16, virtual 46) licensed to serve Memphis, Tennessee, United States; see List of television stations in Tennessee
- WWWN-LP, a defunct low-power television station (channel 15) formerly licensed to serve Memphis, Tennessee
- WAIH (FM), a radio station (96.5 FM) licensed to serve Holly Springs, Mississippi, United States, which held the call sign WWWN from 2012 to 2014
- WKQX (FM), a radio station (101.1 FM) licensed to serve Chicago, Illinois, United States, which held the call sign WWWN in 2011
