= KPBT-TV =

Television station in Odessa, Texas

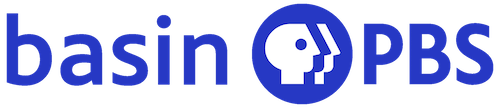
- Odessa–Midland, Texas; United States
- City: Odessa, Texas
- Channels: Digital: 28 (UHF); Virtual: 36
- Branding: Basin PBS

Programming
- Affiliations: 36.1: PBS; 36.2: PBS Kids

Ownership
- Owner: Permian Basin Public Telecommunications, Inc.

History
- First air date: March 24, 1986
- Former call signs: KOCV-TV (1986–2006)
- Former channel numbers: Analog: 36 (UHF, 1986–2009); Digital: 38 (UHF, 2003–2018)
- Call sign meaning: Permian Basin Television

Technical information
- Licensing authority: FCC
- Facility ID: 50044
- ERP: 515 kW
- HAAT: 224 m (735 ft)
- Transmitter coordinates: 32°5′11″N 102°17′12″W

Links
- Public license information: Public file; LMS
- Website: www.basinpbs.org

KPBT-TV (channel 36), branded Basin PBS, is a PBS member television station licensed to Odessa, Texas, United States, serving the Permian Basin area. Owned by Permian Basin Public Telecommunications, Inc., the station maintains studios at the historic Ritz Theater on North Main Street in downtown Midland and a transmitter near Gardendale.

Public television came to the Permian Basin in 1986 when Odessa College started KOCV-TV from studios and a transmitter located on its campus. However, in 2003, budget cuts mandated by the state of Texas led the college to discontinue support for the station and seek another licensee. The station was transferred to the Ector County Independent School District, but the station's financial needs surpassed the school system's capacity; less than two years after agreeing to take on KOCV-TV, it began looking for a buyer.

The school district transferred the station to a community licensee, Permian Basin Public Telecommunications, in December 2005. The station changed its call sign to KPBT-TV. It continued to rely on temporary office space for its operations until renovating the Ritz Theater in downtown Midland in 2019. In addition to airing national public television programming, KPBT-TV produces local music and public affairs specials.

== History ==
=== Founding by Odessa College ===
In 1983, Odessa College, owner of KOCV-FM, filed an application with the Federal Communications Commission (FCC) for a new educational TV station on channel 36 in Odessa. The college already had a broadcasting program and aired a nightly newscast on cable. For PBS programming, cable viewers received KERA-TV from Dallas. The original application for federal grant money was denied in July 1983. The FCC granted a construction permit in November 1984, and the National Telecommunications and Information Administration approved a grant application in 1985, sufficient to start KOCV-TV. Even though it delayed the launch, Odessa College opted to build its own tower on the campus to avoid having to pay fees to lease another facility.

KOCV-TV began broadcasting on March 24, 1986. Cable companies in the Permian Basin continued to carry KERA for a short time to allow the new station to work out technical bugs; channel 36 also supplanted KERA as the area's provider of instructional television programming. The station's first significant local programming debuted in 1991 with the premiere of West Texas Journal, a weekly news roundtable.

=== Ector County ISD ownership and sale ===
Odessa College continued to own KOCV-TV until 2003, when it moved to divest the station in the face of state-mandated budget cuts. The state ordered the college to immediately cut seven percent of its budget and anticipate further reductions in funding for two further fiscal years, and the college—facing declining student interest—responded by cutting all $400,000 of its funding for the station. This covered equipment costs and employee salaries. The move put the station's future, as well as its conversion to digital broadcasting and a planned partnership with the University of Texas Permian Basin, in jeopardy. Odessa College began to discuss transferring ownership with various educational entities and other PBS member stations. In April, trustees of the Ector County Independent School District (ECISD) approved acquiring KOCV-TV from Odessa College; the college would continue to house key station equipment, but studios would move to the ECISD broadcast center. ECISD would benefit from grant money already received to begin digital broadcasting and provide automation that would allow for 24-hour programming. KOCV-DT began operating in October 2003.

The ECISD found itself unable to sustain KOCV-TV's operations. Funding it received to run the station from various sources was insufficient, with a shortfall of about $150,000. More than half of its overall revenue came from grants from the Corporation for Public Broadcasting. After considering closing the station, the district decided to retain the license until August 31, 2005, to find a potential buyer for KOCV-TV. Two options existed: find another educational institution to run the station or form a community licensee—a non-governmental body—to take it over. Midland College analyzed purchasing KOCV-TV.

While the sale process was under way, in 2005, the station began branding as Permian Basin PBS. ECISD officials announced that a call sign change would likely accompany any transfer to a new owner.

=== Community ownership ===
On August 30, 2005, the ECISD board approved the transfer of KOCV-TV to a new community licensee, Permian Basin Public Telecommunications, Inc. (PBPT). This group would also take over all management functions for the station until the FCC authorized the license transfer. The group included business leaders from the region and advising lawyers and engineers. The FCC granted approval in late December, at which time KOCV-TV changed its call sign to KPBT-TV. The station temporarily moved back to Odessa College while searching for a new location from which to operate. New office space was located in Odessa at the local Commemorative Air Force.

Under its new community ownership, KPBT-TV embarked on producing several new local programs. A high school quiz tournament debuted in 2007, while a series titled Proud Heritage profiled West Texas ranching families.

KPBT-TV was the only Permian Basin-area television station to switch to digital television early, converting on the original national transition date of February 17, 2009, instead of June 12. The analog transmitter continued to broadcast a notice of the change for two weeks after that date. The station opted to keep the original date as a cost-cutting measure because it would no longer need to power both transmitters. The station's digital signal remained on its pre-transition UHF channel 38, using virtual channel 36. The transmitter facility itself continued to be at Odessa College until KPBT-TV began broadcasting its signal from a location near the KOSA-TV studios at Music City Mall in July 2012.

In 2011, Basin PBS began to scout out new locations for its headquarters, as Odessa College had requested the use of space it was occupying there. The station focused on Midland as its new home and identified the historic Ritz Theater as a possible site. The Ritz, a movie house built in 1928, later served as a church venue and had been vacant since a nightclub in the building closed in 2003. A capital campaign launched to raise the funds necessary to complete the move, but as time wound down in 2013, the station was $400,000 short of the funds it needed. In 2014, Basin PBS unveiled its plans for the facility, reconstructing the building's internal systems and renovating the façade to one similar to its 1950s appearance. Work began in 2016 to transform the Ritz into the broadcaster's new home, including leveling the sloped floor, and Basin PBS moved in during 2019. The station now hosts an annual Main Street Live concert outside the theater.

== Funding ==
In fiscal year 2024, Basin PBS generated $1.907 million in revenue, the largest share coming from an $890,000 grant from the Corporation for Public Broadcasting. Memberships accounted for $87,000 in revenue; the station had 782 members, and 28 major individual donors donated another $108,000.

== Local programming ==
Local programming produced by Basin PBS includes One Question, a regular interview series with authors; community town halls and debates; and local and regional music programming.

== Technical information ==
=== Subchannels ===
The KPBT-TV transmitter is near Gardendale. Its signal is multiplexed with PBS programming, PBS Kids, and audio from the Recording Library of West Texas, the region's radio reading service:

Subchannels of KPBT-TV
| Channel | Res. | Short name | Programming |
|---|---|---|---|
| 36.1 | 1080i | KPBT-MN | PBS |
| 36.2 | 1080i | KPBT-KD | PBS Kids |
| 36.3 | Audio only | RLWT | Recording Library of West Texas |
