= WCTE =

Television station in Cookeville, Tennessee

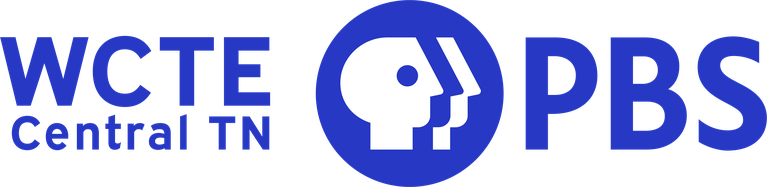
- Cookeville, Tennessee; United States
- Channels: Digital: 22 (UHF); Virtual: 22
- Branding: WCTE Central TN PBS

Programming
- Affiliations: 22.1: PBS; for others, see § Subchannels

Ownership
- Owner: Upper Cumberland Broadcast Council

History
- First air date: August 21, 1978
- Former channel numbers: Analog: 22 (UHF, 1978–2009); Digital: 52 (UHF, 2004–2009)

Technical information
- Licensing authority: FCC
- Facility ID: 69479
- ERP: 200 kW
- HAAT: 425 m (1,394 ft)
- Transmitter coordinates: 36°10′26″N 85°20′37″W

Links
- Public license information: Public file; LMS
- Website: www.wcte.org

WCTE (channel 22) is a PBS member television station in Cookeville, Tennessee, United States, serving the Upper Cumberland region. Owned by the Upper Cumberland Broadcast Council (UCBC), the station maintains studios on East Broad Street in downtown Cookeville, adjacent to the Putnam County courthouse; its transmitter is located northwest of Monterey, Tennessee. Although Cookeville is part of the Nashville market, the station also serves the western fringe of the Knoxville market.

== History ==
WCTE's Logo used from 2003 until 2020. Different variations of this logo would be used in between those times.

WCTE first signed on the air on August 21, 1978. It was the last in a series of stations launched by the Tennessee Department of Education over a 12-year period, finally bringing public television to the last remaining part of the state that previously had little or no access to it. Some of the western parts of the viewing area could pick up the signal of Nashville's WDCN (now WNPT) when it broadcast on channel 2 from 1962 to 1973, but WDCN's move to the weaker channel 8 in 1973 left most of the territory without PBS service for five years.

In 1984, the state relinquished WCTE and its other stations to community boards, such as the UCBC.

The station, like its former sister stations WLJT, WSJK (now known as WETP) and WTCI, emphasizes programming of local interest in addition to carrying a full schedule of PBS programs. The community programming is particularly important because, being a rural, relatively isolated area, the Upper Cumberland region gets little or no coverage from commercial broadcasters in Nashville, Knoxville or Chattanooga, the three major media markets nearest the area.

For some time after the DTV transition in 2009, WCTE broadcast with an effective radiated power (ERP) of 57 kW with an antenna height of 412 meters. Then, a transmitter and antenna upgrade early in 2011 increased ERP to 200 kW with an antenna height of 425 meters.

The station originally had studios within the west-side stadium construction of Tucker Stadium on the campus of Tennessee Technological University on North Peachtree Avenue; after an extensive relocation effort, the studios moved to a location on East Broad Street in downtown Cookeville.

WCTE's over-the-air (OTA) signal is receivable in much of Middle Tennessee and in some adjoining parts of South Central Kentucky.

== Technical information ==
=== Subchannels ===
The station's signal is multiplexed:

Subchannels of WCTE
Subchannel	Res.	Short name	Programming
22.1	1080i	WCTE-DT	PBS
22.2	480i	World	World
22.3	480i	Create	Create (4:3)
22.4	480i	Kids	PBS Kids

=== Analog-to-digital conversion ===
WCTE shut down its analog signal, over UHF channel 22, on June 12, 2009, the official date on which full-power television stations in the United States transitioned from analog to digital broadcasts under federal mandate. The station's digital signal relocated from its pre-transition UHF channel 52, which was among the high band UHF channels (52–69) that were removed from broadcasting use as a result of the transition, to its former analog-era UHF channel 22.
