= WMTJ =

Television station in Fajardo, Puerto Rico

WMTJ and WQTO
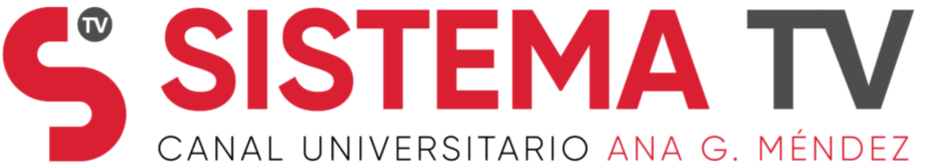

WMTJ: Fajardo–San Juan; WQTO: Ponce; Puerto Rico
- Channels for WMTJ: Digital: 15 (UHF); Virtual: 40
- Channels for WQTO: Digital: 19 (UHF); Virtual: 26
- Branding: Sistema TV

Programming
- Affiliations: 40.1–.3/26.1–.3: PBS; 40.2/26.2: PBS Kids

Ownership
- Owner: Ana G. Méndez University; (Sistema Universitario Ana G. Méndez, Inc.)

History
- First air date: WMTJ: April 22, 1985; WQTO: August 14, 1986
- Former channel number: WMTJ: Analog: 40 (UHF, 1985–2009); Digital: 16 (UHF, 2002–2018); WQTO: Analog: 26 (UHF, 1986–2009); Digital: 25 (UHF, 2002–2019)
- Former affiliations: Dark (2017–2018)
- Call sign meaning: WMTJ: Méndez Television San Juan (station owner)

Technical information
- Licensing authority: FCC
- Facility ID: WMTJ: 2174; WQTO: 2175
- ERP: WMTJ: 174 kW; WQTO: 696 kW (DTS1) 13.1 kW (DTS2)
- HAAT: WMTJ: 853 m (2,799 ft); WQTO: 310 m (1,017 ft) (DTS1) 334 m (1,096 ft) (DTS2)
- Transmitter coordinates: WMTJ: 18°18′27.8″N 65°47′41.5″W; WQTO: 18°4′41″N 66°44′54″W (DTS1) 18°18′58.8″N 67°10′47.6″W (DTS2)

Links
- Public license information: WMTJ: Public file; LMS; WQTO: Public file; LMS
- Website: sistematv.com

WMTJ (channel 40), branded Sistema TV, is a PBS member television station licensed to Fajardo, Puerto Rico, serving the U.S. territory. The station is owned by Ana G. Méndez University (UAGM). WMTJ's studios are located on UAGM's main campus in the Cupey district of San Juan, and its transmitter is located in the El Yunque National Forest.

WMTJ has one full-service satellite: WQTO (channel 26) in Ponce. WMTJ's digital signal was not on the air until a few months before the transition deadline. Installation of a digital transmitter for WMTJ had been difficult as the transmitter site is located in a remote tropical forest on federally owned land, requiring USDA Forest Service approvals of any new transmission tower.

The majority of WMTJ's daily programming is from PBS, but it broadcasts some locally produced content as well.

== History ==
WMTJ first broadcast in April 1985.

On June 12, 2009, WMTJ and WQTO signed off their analog signals and completed their move to digital.

Due to damage from Hurricane Maria, WMTJ was forced to go off the air on September 20, 2017 (the station's website still lists the schedule from September 11 to 17, 2017, with some shows no longer on the schedule such as Thomas & Friends). On October 16, 2017, the Ana G. Mendez University System announced that the station would be shut down indefinitely as part of a larger suspension of non-academic activities at the school. This shutdown left Puerto Rico without a PBS station as fellow public television station WIPR-TV (channel 6) had dropped its PBS membership in 2011. On December 20, WMTJ returned to the air via Liberty Puerto Rico, some of PBS programming can be seen on Channel 3 & 67 and in HD on channels 203 & 267. On January 2, 2018, just months after the shutdown, WMTJ resumed regular over-the-air broadcasting operations via station WSTE-DT (Teleisla) and can be seen on channel 40.1 from the transmitter located in Aguas Buenas remaining on the air until January 23. On January 24, WMTJ resumed broadcasting with a reduced power of 17.7 kilowatts from El Yunque. On January 1, 2019, WMTJ returned to the air on its digital channel 15 and transmitter power increased to 174 kilowatts. While the station is still available on Dish Network in Puerto Rico, the station is no longer available on DirecTV in Puerto Rico for unknown reasons as of 2017.

On April 26, 2022, WIPR-TV officially rejoined PBS after ten years as an educational independent station and returned to being Puerto Rico's only other PBS member station.

== Subchannels ==
The stations' signals are multiplexed:

Subchannels of WMTJ and WQTO
Channel		Res.	Short name		Programming
WMTJ	WQTO	Res.	WMTJ	WQTO	Programming
40.1	26.1	1080i	WMTJ-HD	WQTO-HD	PBS
40.2	26.2	1080i	40.2KID	26.2KID	PBS Kids
40.3	26.3	720p	WMTJ-D3	WQTO-D3	Simulcast of DT1
