= WBRA-TV =

Television station in Roanoke, Virginia

- Roanoke–Lynchburg, Virginia; United States
- City: Roanoke, Virginia
- Channels: Digital: 13 (VHF); Virtual: 15
- Branding: Blue Ridge PBS

Programming
- Affiliations: 15.1: PBS; for others, see § Subchannels

Ownership
- Owner: Blue Ridge Public Television, Inc.

History
- First air date: August 1, 1967
- Former channel numbers: Analog: 15 (UHF, 1967–2009); Digital: 3 (VHF, 2003–2026)
- Former affiliations: NET (1967–1970)
- Call sign meaning: Blue Ridge Educational Television Association

Technical information
- Licensing authority: FCC
- Facility ID: 5981
- ERP: 66 kW
- HAAT: 629.6 m (2,066 ft)
- Transmitter coordinates: 37°11′46″N 80°9′16″W

Links
- Public license information: Public file; LMS
- Website: www.blueridgepbs.org

WBRA-TV (channel 15) is a PBS member television station in Roanoke, Virginia, United States, owned by Blue Ridge Public Television, Inc. The station's studios are located on McNeil Drive in southwest Roanoke, and its transmitter is located on Poor Mountain in unincorporated southwestern Roanoke County.

== History ==
WBRA-TV signed on for the first time on August 1, 1967. It claims to be the first all-color educational station in the country. It was originally a member of National Educational Television (NET), before that organization was replaced by PBS in 1970.

In the 1980s, WBRA began identifying on-air as Blue Ridge Public Television, due to its location near the Blue Ridge Mountains. On February 19, 2007, it changed its on-air name to Blue Ridge PBS.

WBRA established two satellite transmitters—WSVN-TV (channel 47) in Norton was activated in 1971 and WMSY-TV (channel 52) in Marion began operations in 1981. WSBN brought a city-grade PBS signal to the Tri-Cities for the first time. On March 14, 1983, WSVN-TV changed its call sign to WSBN-TV. This allowed then-NBC affiliate WCKT (channel 7, now a Fox affiliate as WSVN) in Miami, Florida, to change its call sign three months later. Both stations were also carried on the Tri-Cities DirecTV and Dish Network feeds.

In March 2013, Blue Ridge PBS announced that it would close both WSBN-TV and WMSY-TV by June 30, 2013, leaving East Tennessee PBS outlet WETP as the sole source of PBS programming in the Tri-Cities. The move came as a result of budget cuts that followed the elimination of Virginia's funding for public broadcasting stations in 2012. However, station president James Baum told The Roanoke Times that there were no plans to tear down the transmitters, leaving the possibility that WSBN and WMSY could return in the future.

In October 2014, Blue Ridge PBS relaunched WSBN-TV and WMSY-TV as Southwest Virginia Public Television (SWVAPT), which carried a secondary schedule incorporating programming of relevance to the region (such as Song of the Mountains and locally-produced content) and national PBS programs. The service was also carried on WBRA-DT2 and local cable providers. In 2017, the two stations went off the air, and were sold for nearly $5.8 million in the FCC's spectrum incentive auction; station management cited that residents of the Tri-Cities region could receive PBS service from Blue Ridge PBS and other nearby stations such as WETP-TV, KET, PBS North Carolina, and West Virginia Public Broadcasting, although the mountainous terrain of the region makes it difficult to receive over-the-air signals.

In August 2021, Blue Ridge PBS launched ECHO (Education, Community, Health, Opportunity)—a new subchannel and streaming platform featuring locally-produced, "community based" educational programming.

In September 2022, Blue Ridge PBS announced that it would launch a new local PBS service for Southwest Virginia, PBS Appalachia Virginia, which debuted in June 2023. Unlike its predecessors, PBS Appalachia Virginia is structured as a cable- and streaming-only broadcaster and does not offer an over-the-air service. As part of the launch, SWVAPT was replaced on WBRA-DT2 by "Blue Ridge PBS 2".

== Technical information ==
=== Subchannels ===
The station's signal is multiplexed:

Subchannels of WBRA-TV
Subchannel	Res.	Short name	Programming
15.1	1080i	BRPBS	PBS
15.2	1080i	ECHO TV	Blue Ridge PBS ECHO
15.3	1080i	BRKIDS	PBS Kids
15.4	480i	ECHOLIF	ECHO Lifestyles
15.5	480i	ECHODOC	ECHO Documentaries
15.6	480i	CRTWRLD	World (12 a.m.–12 p.m.); Create (12 p.m.–12 a.m.)

=== Former relays ===
Station	City of license	Channels VC / RF	First air date	Last air date	ERP	HAAT	Facility ID	Transmitter coordinates	Former callsigns
WSBN-TV^{1}	Norton	47; 32 (UHF)	March 30, 1971	March 27, 2017 (license canceled November 3, 2017)	100 kW	591 m (1,939 ft)	5985	36°53′53″N 82°37′21″W	WSVN-TV (1971–1983)
WMSY-TV	Marion	52; 42 (UHF)	August 1, 1981	March 27, 2017 (license canceled November 3, 2017)	100 kW	448 m (1,470 ft)	5982	36°54′7″N 81°32′32″W	

Notes:

- 1. WSBN-TV used the callsign WSVN-TV until March 14, 1983.

=== Analog-to-digital conversion ===
Blue Ridge PBS' stations shut down their analog signals on June 12, 2009, the official date on which full-power television stations in the United States transitioned from analog to digital broadcasts under federal mandate. The station's digital channel allocations post-transition are as follows:

- WBRA-TV shut down its analog signal, over UHF channel 15; the station's digital signal remained on its pre-transition VHF channel 3, using virtual channel 15.
- WSBN-TV shut down its analog signal, over UHF channel 47; the station's digital signal remained on its pre-transition UHF channel 32, using virtual channel 47.
- WMSY-TV shut down its analog signal, over UHF channel 52; the station's digital signal remained on its pre-transition UHF channel 42, using virtual channel 52.
