= Tennessee Higher Education Commission =

Government agency in Tennessee, United States

- Type: Coordinating Board
- Established: 1967
- Location: Nashville, Tennessee
- Website: THEC

The Tennessee Higher Education Commission (THEC) was established by the Tennessee General Assembly in 1967 to coordinate and support the efforts of higher education institutions in the State of Tennessee. One of its statutory requirements is to create a master plan for developing public higher education in Tennessee.

== Purposes ==
The agency, a traditional higher education coordinating board, serves several important functions, including: Development and proponency for the state public agenda for higher education; Administration of the outcomes based funding formula, a method by which appropriations are distributed to public colleges and universities; Approval of all new academic programs; Formulation and recommendations for capital project funding; General higher education policy development.

THEC is a combined agency with the Tennessee Student Assistance Corporation, the state financial aid agency, and the THEC Executive Director holds a dual appointment as leader of both entities.

In recent years, THEC has emerged as a central leader for higher education efforts in the state, reinforced substantially by the Complete College Tennessee Act of 2010 and the FOCUS Act of 2016.

In 1984, the THEC awarded a grant to East Tennessee State University to establish the Center of Excellence for Appalachian Studies and Services.

THEC is the official approving agency in Tennessee for any postsecondary institution, public or private, desiring to enroll students receiving veterans' benefits from the United States Department of Veterans Affairs such as those available under the G. I. Bill of Rights.

== Composition ==
The Tennessee Higher Education Commission is composed of one "lay" member from each of the state's nine Congressional districts, appointed to six-year terms, the three state constitutional officers (Secretary of State, State Treasurer and Comptroller of the Treasury), two student commissioners serving staggered two-year terms (one each from the University of Tennessee system and the Tennessee Board of Regents system, with voting rights only during the second year of the term, assuring only one voting student-member at a time), and the executive director of the State Board of Education, a nonvoting member. With a maximum total vote of 13 at any one time, the majority required for action to be taken is usually seven votes.
