= WLJT =

Television station in Lexington, Tennessee

- Lexington–Martin–; Jackson, Tennessee; United States
- City: Lexington, Tennessee
- Channels: Digital: 27 (UHF); Virtual: 11
- Branding: West TN PBS

Programming
- Affiliations: 11.1: PBS; 11.2: PBS Kids; 11.3: Create

Ownership
- Owner: West Tennessee Public Television Council, Inc.

History
- First air date: February 13, 1968
- Former call signs: WLJT (1968–2010); WLJT-DT (2010–2025)
- Former channel numbers: Analog: 11 (VHF (1968–2009); Digital: 47 (UHF, 2004–2018)
- Former affiliations: NET (1968–1970)
- Call sign meaning: Lexington Jackson Tennessee

Technical information
- Licensing authority: FCC
- Facility ID: 71645
- ERP: 142 kW
- HAAT: 205 m (673 ft)
- Transmitter coordinates: 35°42′12″N 88°36′10″W

Links
- Public license information: Public file; LMS
- Website: www.westtnpbs.org

WLJT (channel 11), known as West TN PBS, is a PBS member television station licensed to Lexington, Tennessee, United States, serving western and northwestern Tennessee. The station is owned by the West Tennessee Public Television Council and operates from the Jackson Media Center, a studio and office facility on Campbell Street in midtown Jackson, and offices on the campus of the University of Tennessee at Martin. Its transmitter is located on US 412 midway between Jackson and Lexington.

WLJT began broadcasting in 1968. Built as one of four educational stations under the control of the Tennessee Department of Education, it almost exclusively rebroadcast WKNO in Memphis. In 1981, studios were established at UT–Martin, allowing for the station to begin local programming. That same year, the state began the process to spin WLJT out to community control. The Martin studios were demolished in 2019, and the Jackson Media Center opened several years later. The station's local programming focuses on sports and community events in rural West Tennessee.

== History ==
=== State ownership ===
In 1953, officials with the Tennessee Educational Television Commission requested the assignment of several channels across the state for noncommercial educational use, including channel 11 at Lexington, in addition to existing assignments for Memphis, Nashville, Knoxville, and Chattanooga. The Federal Communications Commission (FCC) granted the assignments in March 1954. In 1965, the Tennessee Department of Education filed with the FCC for a construction permit and with the federal government to request a grant to cover construction costs. The station would serve 553,000 people, including 137,000 schoolchildren. The station would not have associated studios but initially serve to repeat Memphis educational station WKNO (channel 10).

The grant and construction permit were received in April 1966. Construction work had begun in earnest by June 1967, and WLJT began operations on February 13, 1968. It rebroadcast WKNO with extremely limited local programming; while it broadcast on weekdays in 1977, it did not do so in 1978, leaving the local cable system to carry WKNO itself.

=== Community ownership ===
In 1980, controversy over programming at WSJK-TV in Sneedville led to scrutiny of the state educational television system, which had grown to four state-owned stations plus WKNO and WDCN in Nashville, which were community-owned. One of the two reports suggested that WLJT be sold to WKNO; the other recommended spinning out all of the stations in the system to community licensees. After WKNO expressed no interest, the state chose the latter option when legislators passed and Governor Lamar Alexander signed the Tennessee Educational Television Network Act of 1981. This legislation provided for the transfer of the four Department of Education–owned stations to community entities by 1986.

In August 1981, the West Tennessee Public Television Council was formed, and WLJT began local programming from studios at UT–Martin. This also added hands-on experience opportunities to UT–Martin's broadcasting program. In 1982, the second year of local content, it produced 101 hours of its own programming. In April 1984, the spin-off was completed, and the station began on-air fundraising efforts. In addition to typical PBS programming, WLJT aired local sports and a regional country music show as part of its local output. In 1993, engineering operations were able to move to Martin when a new master and remote control facility opened at the studios.

WLJT began digital broadcasting on channel 47 on February 20, 2004, and discontinued analog broadcasting on February 17, 2009. The station continued to broadcast on channel 47, using virtual channel 11, until being repacked to channel 27 as a result of the 2016 United States wireless spectrum auction on August 10, 2018; channel 14 had been originally assigned.

The Communications Building at UT Martin, which housed WLJT, was torn down by the university in 2019 to make way for a new engineering and science building. In 2023, the station acquired buildings in midtown Jackson to turn into the Jackson Media Center.

By fiscal year 2022, nearly half of WLJT's revenues—totaling $1.72 million that year—came in the form of grants from the Corporation for Public Broadcasting, while $467,000 came from state agencies. The station's 892 members contributed $75,000 in funding. In 2025, Congress rescinded federal funding for public broadcasting, resulting in a loss of 45% of the station's budget.

== Local programming ==
In 2022, WLJT broadcast 23 1/2 hours (12 on broadcast, 11 1/2 online) of local community events. Current local programs produced by WLJT include Tennessee is Talking, Tennessee Writes, Channel 11 Checkup, All About Home History, Retro 11, and Spotlight 11.

== Subchannels ==
WLJT's transmitter is located on U.S. Route 412 midway between Jackson and Lexington. The station's signal is multiplexed:

Subchannels of WLJT
Subchannel	Res.	Short name	Programming
11.1	1080i	WLJT-HD	PBS
11.2	480i	WLJT-DT	PBS Kids
11.3	480i	WLJT-DT	Create
