= WNPT =

Television station in Nashville, Tennessee

- Nashville, Tennessee; United States
- Channels: Digital: 7 (VHF); Virtual: 8
- Branding: Nashville PBS

Programming
- Affiliations: 8.1: PBS; for others, see § Subchannels

Ownership
- Owner: Nashville Public Television, Inc.

History
- First air date: September 10, 1962
- Former call signs: WDCN-TV (1962–1983); WDCN (1983–2000)
- Former channel numbers: Analog: 2 (VHF, 1962–1973), 8 (VHF, 1973–2009); Digital: 46 (UHF, 2004–2009), 8 (VHF, 2009–2020)
- Former affiliations: NET (1962–1970)
- Call sign meaning: Nashville Public Television

Technical information
- Licensing authority: FCC
- Facility ID: 41398
- ERP: 17.65 kW
- HAAT: 390 m (1,280 ft)
- Transmitter coordinates: 36°2′49.9″N 86°49′48.5″W

Links
- Public license information: Public file; LMS
- Website: www.wnpt.org

WNPT (channel 8) is a PBS member television station in Nashville, Tennessee, United States. The station is owned by Nashville Public Television, Inc., a community-funded, non-profit organization. WNPT's studios are located on Rains Avenue in southeast Nashville, and its transmitter is located in the southern suburb of Forest Hills.

Educational television in Nashville began when this station began broadcasting on September 10, 1962, as WDCN-TV on channel 2. Its activation by the school boards of Davidson County and Nashville—which merged that October—was the culmination of years of effort to start an educational station to serve the schools of Middle Tennessee and southern Kentucky. It originally operated from studios being vacated by commercial station WSM-TV. In the 1960s, WDCN-TV was a major producer of educational programming for schools.

On December 11, 1973, WDCN-TV moved to channel 8, and commercial station WSIX-TV moved from channel 8 and became WNGE-TV on channel 2. The agreement provided improved technical facilities for both stations and gave WDCN a cash infusion that allowed it to build its present studios. However, as time went on, the station became an underperformer in PBS, with a conservative approach to programming; very few programs produced for national distribution; and lagging community support. In order to solve these issues and separate the station from the Metro school board, the station was spun out in 1999 to Nashville Public Television and changed its call sign to WNPT on February 22, 2000. Donations and local programming rose in the early 2000s after the split was carried out.

== Educational television in Nashville: Early efforts ==
In October 1951, Vanderbilt University and the Nashville city school system requested that the Federal Communications Commission (FCC) set aside a channel for future educational television, though they had no definitive plans to construct a station at the time. Channel 2 was designated as a reserved non-commercial channel when the commission ended its four-year freeze on television station grants in 1952.

Efforts then began to raise the funds that would be necessary to construct such a station. In 1953, the Nashville Educational Television Foundation was formed as a community entity, and in June 1954, a fundraising drive was initiated with the support of more than 100 local women's organizations. Community response was poor, even though the Ford Foundation promised more time for backers to solicit money. In 1955, when the Tennessee legislature provided a $50,000 experimental grant for educational television, the money went to the better-prepared group in Memphis, though the possibility was left open for Nashville to be next in line. Even though an application remained on file with the FCC, by 1956 the foundation struggled to show progress on its efforts to build channel 2. A lack of capital kept Nashville from having its own educational station. By February 1960, just $20,000 of the original $80,000 in pledges remained in the bank, most of them having been withdrawn when the original fund drive failed.

In February 1960, the Middle Tennessee Radio and Television Council mounted a new effort to promote the establishment of channel 2. Officials visited the Memphis station, WKNO, in early May, and agencies including the school boards of Davidson County and Nashville began appropriating funds for an educational station. An expert in the field told the Nashville Educational Television Foundation, "You have enough money and equipment at your disposal to operate an educational TV station right now." The foundation hired a director and set up offices.

== WDCN-TV: The channel 2 years ==
=== Construction ===
On January 19, 1961, the Nashville city board of education approved plans to start an educational television station and invited the Davidson County school board to join it. The board's recommendation highlighted the need for public funding to get the station off the ground and noted that ownership by school boards would bring the station closer to its educational mission. This led to some debate as to whether a public or community licensee was a more advantageous arrangement, but a larger matter soon arose when a group of attorneys in Hamilton, Alabama, petitioned the FCC to take unused educational television channel 2 assignments from Nashville and State College, Mississippi, and assign channel 2 for commercial use to their community, which would leave Nashville educational interests to build a channel on the lesser ultra high frequency (UHF) band. At the urging of Albert Gore Sr., the city superintendent of schools petitioned the Nashville city council for funding to avoid losing channel 2. City and county officials informed the FCC of their desire to build and run a station. The FCC rejected the Hamilton request in March. Another roadblock was cleared in July when the Davidson County Court authorized the county to participate in the station project with the city.

An opportunity presented itself for studio facilities. WSM-TV was planning to relocate from its existing site in Nashville's Belmont area, at 15th and Compton avenues, and the tower at the existing site was not being used by that station. Meanwhile, school officials from around the region expressed interest in utilizing the new station; channel 2 would expand the existing educational television offering, in which classes were being provided on a limited basis by the three commercial stations. After first rejecting a $150,000 offer for the WSM-TV property as too low, the station's owner, National Life and Accident Insurance Company, compromised and accepted a $175,000 bid; the two stations would be co-located for two years before the new WSM-TV facility opened. A small addition would be built to the studios.

On February 5, 1962, the two school boards jointly filed for a construction permit, which the FCC granted on March 23. Work then began to replace the disused WSM-TV antenna with one for channel 2 and to install the temporary master control room necessary while channels 2 and 4 shared the building. The station also set its first schedule of programs for schools; high school programs would be broadcast three times daily to accommodate different class schedules, and nearly all grade levels would be offered a course. By May, call letters had been selected: WDCN-TV, representing Davidson County and Nashville.

=== Early years ===
The very first program test, a 14-minute film on jet propulsion, went out on the morning of June 25. On the morning of September 10, 1962, high school teacher Jo Ann Ruhr presented the station's first regular program, a 30-minute biology class for high school sophomores; that night, channel 2 presented a preview of its programs for adults from National Educational Television. A total of 18 school systems in Middle Tennessee, including as far away as Paris, Tennessee, and Glasgow, Kentucky, began using WDCN-TV programs. On October 4, the Tennessee Supreme Court upheld the legality of city-county consolidation; with immediate effect, the city and county school systems consolidated into what was known as Metro. WDCN-TV and WSM-TV continued to share studios for a year until WSM-TV's new facility opened in September 1963; one WSM employee ripped his pants on a model of a space rocket used by channel 2, and on one occasion channel 4 broadcast a WDCN-TV station ID.

In September 1963, the station increased its effective radiated power from 16,000 to 100,000 watts utilizing state funding. By 1964, the original roster of 18 school systems utilizing the station's services had swollen to 47 systems with more than 200,000 students, including Bowling Green, Kentucky. (Note: WDCN/WNPT was available on Bowling Green cable until 2005.) WDCN-TV was producing nearly all of its classes in-house and distributing courses to educational stations in Memphis, Chicago, and New York. In addition to schoolchildren, parents and the elderly were also reported to be watching the educational programming.

The founding general manager of WDCN-TV, Robert C. Glazier, departed Nashville in 1965 for a similar post at KETC in St. Louis, where he would receive double the salary. He was replaced by Robert L. Shepherd, the station's production manager. Shepherd, aged 32, was among the youngest station managers in the country at the time.

== Channel swap and new studios ==
In early 1971, WSIX-TV, the city's ABC affiliate on channel 8, approached WDCN-TV and suggested the two switch channels. The proposal had clear advantages for each station. WSIX-TV on channel 2 would be able to increase its circulation and coverage in perimeter areas on the lower VHF band, gaining parity with its competitors on channels 4 and 5, while WSIX-TV would provide space on its tower—some 600 feet (180 m) higher than the site in use—for the relocated WDCN-TV on channel 8 for 99 years, improving its signal as well. WDCN-TV would also receive new equipment. There was precedent for such a change; in 1970, ABC affiliate WVUE and educational station WYES-TV in New Orleans exchanged channels in an equivalent circumstance. While that proposal remained pending, another important event took place in station history. In 1971, the Metro school board approved the establishment of the Nashville Public Television Council, which would provide the station with fundraising and development support. One of the new board's first actions was to discuss the channel swap.

After receiving Metro school board approval, WSIX-TV and WDCN-TV jointly approached the FCC in March 1972 to petition for the proposed channel exchange. The FCC took the matter under advisement; it approved in March 1973, noting that though it did not typically approve swaps between low-VHF and high-VHF stations, "exceptional circumstances" made the change in the public interest. After accounting for delays in antenna delivery for the channel 8 facility and missing a September target, December 11 was fixed as the date for the swap.

In November, WDCN-TV switched to the new channel 2 antenna at the WSIX-TV tower on Old Hickory Boulevard. At 9 p.m. on December 11, 1973, the two stations came together for a formal announcement of the channel swap with explanations from Robert Young and Big Bird. WSIX-TV moved to channel 2 as WNGE-TV and began showing Marcus Welby, M.D., while WDCN-TV changed to channel 8 with an installment of The Six Wives of Henry VIII.

In addition to equipment and facilities, WDCN-TV also received $755,000 in cash from WSIX-TV to make the swap. This would be a key funding source as the station sought to build new facilities using that money, federal grants, and $1.3 million in bonds to be issued by Metro. The board of education approved plans in October 1974 to build the studio on the site of the former Central High School; ground was broken in April 1975. The 43,000-square-foot (4,000 m^{2}) facility would provide two studios totaling 7,675 square feet (713.0 m^{2}), more than seven times the size of the existing station studio, with room for a third. The station moved to the building in November 1976, though it was not formally dedicated until September 1977. One of the new studios shared its equipment with WDCN-TV's mobile production truck. The 15th Avenue and Compton site was later occupied by an emergency communications center for Metro.

The "-TV" suffix in the station's call sign was dropped in 1983.

== Spin-off from Metro ==
Under program director Gaylord Ayers, who worked for Metro, the station adopted a generally conservative programming approach that sometimes made headlines for turning down popular programs. In 1986, the station refused to air a program on John Lennon because of bad language; similar reasoning was cited when the station turned down a show on AIDS a year later. One key PBS program, American Playhouse, was turned down as too expensive. The award-winning series South Africa Now, covering apartheid, was rejected by Ayers as "advocacy journalism at an intense level". Four years later, the station passed on Tales of the City, a series that brought some of the highest ratings in PBS history but depicted the gay community and also showed nudity and drug use. In June 1994, a feature report by Sandy Smith in The Tennessean asked, "What's Wrong With This Picture?" It found a station in need of repair. The 1973-vintage transmitting equipment obtained in the channel swap had surpassed its useful life; needed capital expenses were accumulating. The station's school board-led programming policy was constraining; risk-taking in program strategy was discouraged by the structure of the Nashville Public Television Council vis-a-vis the school board. Where once there had been 36 public television stations controlled by school boards, the figure had dwindled to eight by 1994. Live gavel-to-gavel coverage of Metro Council hearings occupied 46 hours a year and displaced PBS programs; this service only migrated to a government-access cable channel in 1997 because WDCN needed to fulfill commitments to PBS underwriters for time slots for shows such as Nova and Frontline. The station had a nearly nonexistent profile as a producer of nationally distributed programs, with only a handful of cultural series ever being picked up by PBS.

After the report, WDCN management proposed that the station be spun off from Metro and to a non-profit community licensee. It commissioned a report from a consultant that recommended the station be split from the school board, stating that doing so would increase community support based on the experiences of other PBS members (KVPT, KRMA, and KTEH) that had done so successfully. The report found that donors often shied away from giving because they assumed the station received sufficient public support from Metro. The need to increase community funding was seen as particularly pressing given projected declines in federal support for public television. Station officials also hoped increased revenues would help them bolster their meager offering of local programming.

[Independence from Metro] frees the station from the perception among some viewers that it has not really progressed and doesn't do more cutting-edge programming for fear of offending people on the school board. We are going to have a much sharper focus on customers, and I mean by that the people who are watching and the people who are supporting us.

— Steve Bass, on the value of independence to WDCN

In March 1998, the Metro Board of Education voted to permit a split of WDCN in principle as long as the station could prove its financial viability as an independent entity by June 1999. In the first pledge drive after the separation was approved, donations were up 50 percent. Amidst this process, general manager Robert Shepherd announced his intention to retire in 1999 after more than 35 years with the station. He was replaced by former WGBH-TV employee Steve Bass, who charted a strategy to improve the station's coverage of arts and local affairs. Amid this changeover, WDCN began managing two educational access channels on local cable systems; this continued through 2003.

The Board of Education officially approved the transfer of WDCN to the new entity, Nashville Public Television, on April 27, 1999. The school board would provide reduced support for five years before ceasing funding of the station altogether after 2003. In splitting from a government agency, the station followed the path of the four educational stations previously built and owned by the Tennessee state government, which were transferred to community licensees in the early 1980s.

== WNPT: Nashville Public Television ==
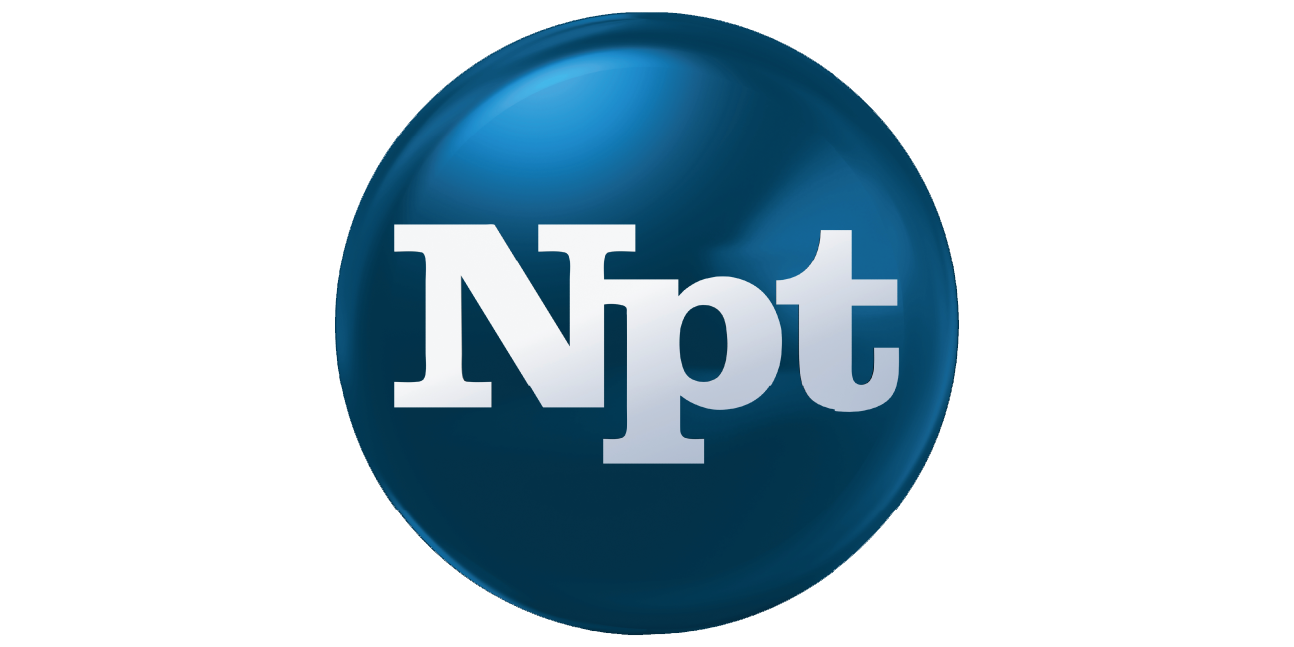
WNPT's blue dot logo, used until 2024.

On February 22, 2000, reflecting the change in ownership and strategy, WDCN became WNPT (Nashville Public Television). In the next five years, Bass was able to increase fundraising to the point where it replaced much of the lost Metro support; the station increased its membership base from 16,000 to 19,500. New programs focused on Nashville's music scene, such as a documentary on Hank Williams Sr., won national distribution from PBS, while the station launched its digital signal in 2004. Even though Bass was able to reduce the percentage of grant funding in NPT's budget from 65 percent to 30 percent, the station took longer to recover from the deficits created by the end of Metro subsidies for the station's operation and had to scale back some programming and operational functions to compensate.

When Bass left in 2005 to become the CEO of Oregon Public Broadcasting, he was replaced by his second-in-command, Beth Curley. Curley ran NPT for 12 years, retiring in 2017. During Curley's tenure, the station began multicasting with a secondary channel, NPT2, which also featured coverage of the Tennessee House of Representatives.

WNPT shut down its analog signal, over VHF channel 8, on June 12, 2009, the official date on which full-power television stations in the United States transitioned from analog to digital broadcasts under federal mandate. The station's digital signal relocated from its pre-transition UHF channel 46 to VHF channel 8 for post-transition operations. It then moved again to channel 7 in 2020 as a result of the 2016 United States wireless spectrum auction.

Curley was replaced as president and CEO by Kevin Crane; Crane resigned in 2020, and the board selected Becky Magure, leader of WCTE in nearby Cookeville, Tennessee, to replace him as leader of NPT the next year.

In September 2024, WNPT rebranded from Nashville Public Television to Nashville PBS in order to highlight their connection to PBS.

== Funding ==
In fiscal year 2022, NPT generated $6.5 million in operating revenue. Individual giving represented 42 percent of this revenue, with 17 percent coming in the form of restricted gifts by corporations and foundations. The Corporation for Public Broadcasting supplied 20 percent of its funding. There were 22,254 total contributors to the station.

== Local programming ==
Among the station's local programs are two series that debuted in the WDCN era, Tennessee Crossroads (debuted 1987 and hosted by Joe Elmore until his death in 2024) and Volunteer Gardener (debuted 1991). Another long-running series was A Word on Words, literary interviews hosted by The Tennessean editor and NPT volunteer John Seigenthaler. The program ran for 42 years with Seigenthaler as host until his death in 2014. A new interstitial series with the same name began soon after and is hosted by novelists Alka Yoshi and J. T. Ellison. WNPT also presented the last two seasons of The Big Comfy Couch, distributed to select PBS stations via American Public Television.

Since 2012, NPT has produced and distributed Christmas at Belmont, a holiday performing arts program featuring students at Belmont University. In 2021, the tenth year that the special was produced for PBS, 91 percent of stations carried it.

== Subchannels ==
WNPT's transmitter is located in the southern Nashville suburb of Forest Hills. The station's signal is multiplexed:

Subchannels of WNPT
Subchannel	Res.	Short name	Programming
8.1	1080i	NPT-1	PBS
8.2	480i	NPT-2	NPT2/World
8.3	480i	NPT-3	PBS Kids
8.4	480i	NPT-4	Create

== Notes ==
Preceded by None	Channel 2 Nashville occupant 1962–1973	Succeeded by WKRN-TV
Preceded by WSIX-TV (now WKRN-TV)	Channel 8 Nashville occupant 1973–present	Succeeded by Incumbent
