= WKNO (TV) =

Television station in Memphis, Tennessee

- Memphis, Tennessee; United States
- Channels: Digital: 29 (UHF); Virtual: 10

Programming
- Affiliations: 10.1: PBS; 10.2: WKNO 2; 10.3: PBS Kids

Ownership
- Owner: Mid-South Public Communications Foundation
- Sister stations: WKNO-FM

History
- First air date: June 25, 1956
- Former call signs: WKNO-TV (1956–?)
- Former channel numbers: Analog: 10 (VHF, 1956–2009)
- Former affiliations: NET (1956–1970)
- Call sign meaning: Knowledge

Technical information
- Licensing authority: FCC
- Facility ID: 42061
- ERP: 835 kW
- HAAT: 320.2 m (1,050.5 ft)
- Transmitter coordinates: 35°9′16″N 89°49′20″W

Links
- Public license information: Public file; LMS
- Website: www.wkno.org

WKNO (channel 10) is a PBS member television station in Memphis, Tennessee, United States. The station is owned by the Mid-South Public Communications Foundation, a non-profit organization governed by a board of trustees composed of volunteers, and is operated alongside NPR member WKNO-FM (91.1). The two stations share studios on Cherry Farms Road with the TV station's transmitter on Raleigh LaGrange Road, both in Cordova.

WKNO began broadcasting in June 1956 as the first educational television station in Tennessee. It was owned by a community licensee from the beginning and was initially financed by the city's commercial TV stations and later by grants from local and state educational authorities. From 1961 to 2009, the station operated from several locations on the campus of Memphis State University, renamed in 1994 to the University of Memphis, though the university never owned the station. In 2009, WKNO moved to its present facility in Cordova. WKNO airs national PBS programs and produces local programs covering issues relevant to the Memphis area.

== History ==
=== Early years ===
Channel 10 was allocated to Memphis for educational use when the Federal Communications Commission (FCC) assigned television channels and lifted its multi-year freeze on new TV assignments in April 1952. Initially, leaders at the University of Tennessee envisioned a four-station network, including one outlet in Memphis, to use the newly allotted channels; however, city officials rejected setting aside funds to aid the establishment of such a station in Memphis. As a result of the city's refusal to grant money, in May 1953, the Memphis Community Television Foundation was chartered to serve as a non-profit organization to build and run channel 10. In the months that followed, the foundation slowly gathered donations of money and equipment. Among these were a donation from WMCT and the offer of use of a tower.

After receiving the promise of $100,000 from the Ford Foundation if matching funds could be raised locally, the Memphis Community Television Foundation formally applied for channel 10 in February 1954. By this time, the station had received more donations and the support of seven local colleges and universities. A fund drive formally launched in May 1954. Activities to raise money included street puppet shows and a football game between Tennessee State and Lincoln universities, both historically Black institutions. It was lauded as the most publicized such effort to that time. By July, the foundation had raised $70,000 of its $200,000 goal, ultimately finishing at $85,000. The Memphis Board of Education provided office space to the foundation as the station undertook program planning.

In 1955, the station received zoning approval for its transmitter site on Macon Road on land leased to the foundation; subscriptions for a station program guide, another source of income; and a donation of two cameras from WHBQ-TV. More equipment was purchased from the former WJTV in Jackson, Mississippi, which had just merged with that city's WSLI-TV. The state legislature appropriated $50,000 for the project, with Memphis serving as the pilot city for educational television in Tennessee.

A formal construction permit was granted by the FCC on November 23, 1955. The station took the call letters WKNO, one of several sets suggested in a name-the-station contest and sent to the FCC. WKNO-TV began broadcasting on June 25, 1956, a month after its first test signal. For its first few months, the studios were incomplete, so it could only present filmed programming from National Educational Television. As a condition of the funds that enabled it to run for one year, the station did not conduct annual fundraising drives; the three commercial stations in Memphis contributed $60,000 a year for two years to provide money for channel 10's operations, and after that most of its income originated from the Tennessee Board of Education, Memphis City Schools, and Shelby County Schools.

In 1961, the station moved from 268 Jefferson to facilities on the campus of Memphis State University (MSU, now the University of Memphis), utilizing a former Air Force ROTC annex. The Memphis Community Television Foundation was deeded the land and building in which it had been housed to help finance the move. The relocation to the university campus offered the station the opportunity to utilize university talent and facilities in the production of its programming. The relocation coincided with an increase in channel 10's educational output; from one instructional series in 1959, WKNO was airing fifteen such shows by 1966, of which six were weekly live productions. In addition, the station was producing public affairs and cultural series of local interest, such as Memphis Mosaic, College News, and Topic: Memphis City Schools.

Beginning in February 1968, channel 10's educational programs were rebroadcast on WLJT (channel 11) in Lexington. WLJT was built by the state Board of Education as part of a plan to increase educational TV coverage in the state; it had extremely limited local programming capabilities. While WKNO was offered the option of buying WLJT when the state government moved to spin out all of its educational television stations to community licensees, it declined, and WLJT became a separate station operating from the campus of the University of Tennessee at Martin in 1981.

=== Expansion ===
WKNO won a federal grant in 1970 to improve its operations with a taller, 1,114-foot (340 m) tower; a power increase to the maximum of 316,000 watts; and full-color operation, including the ability to present local color programming. Bondurant stepped down that year after 17 years as chairman of the Memphis Community Television Foundation. The upgraded tower facility was activated on June 25, 1971, during a 15th anniversary party. The new tower also supported WKNO-FM 91.1, a public radio station authorized in February 1971 and launched in March 1972. For the first time in its history, the station began regular Saturday broadcasting in November 1972; until then, the station was off the air on Saturdays except for rare event broadcasts.

Later in the decade, work began on new WKNO facilities on MSU's south campus in the former Kennedy Veterans Hospital; the old facility, housed in a 1928-vintage gymnasium, was antiquated and not up to then-current safety standards. The new facility—named for Bondurant, who died in 1976—began use in June 1979 and was dedicated in June 1980. In 1989, the foundation was renamed the Mid-South Public Communications Foundation to reflect its increased scope of activity.

=== Increased local programming and digitalization ===
Mike LaBonia became president and CEO of the WKNO stations in 1990, moving from WYES-TV in New Orleans. He focused on increasing the station's local programming output. In 1993, the station began airing a block of children's shows interspersed with segments titled #10 Friends Circle, intended to fill a void in programming for preschool-age students. The segments were hosted by Charles "Chuck" Scruggs, a station volunteer who had previously been the first Black general manager of WDIA radio. In 1995, they evolved into a weekly show, Sundays at Mr. Chuck's, renamed Hello Mr. Chuck. On a visit to WKNO in 1997, Mister Rogers commented on the Mr. Chuck shows, telling general manager LaBonia that Scruggs was "truly remarkable" and "is achieving things I still struggle to achieve". Scruggs also worked for WKNO as its manager of community education until retiring in 2010.

Mr. Chuck was one of several new projects on which the station embarked in the 1990s, in spite of funding cutbacks at the start of the decade. In 1992, WKNO originated for PBS a 26-part cooking series by Burt Wolf, which turned into a running distribution association with the station including a national pledge marathon and such series as Travels & Traditions. Local public affairs program Informed Sources and a documentary on the Memphis Belle were also part of the station's output at this time.

In 2009, WKNO radio and television moved into a custom-designed all-digital studio facility in Cordova. It was the first facility designed for broadcasting in WKNO's history. In the 2010s, the station was the distributor for such programs as Classic Gospel and Sun Studio Sessions.

== Funding ==
In 2022, WKNO TV had a total revenue of $3.63 million. The station had 9,079 total members, who contributed $1.15 million. The Corporation for Public Broadcasting contributed nearly $875,000, almost all of it in the form of a Community Service Grant.

== Local programming ==
Local programming produced by WKNO includes Family Plot: Gardening in the Mid-South, a gardening program distributed nationally on Create and to other PBS stations; Behind the Headlines, a weekly interview and public affairs program; and The SPARK, a monthly showcase of community leaders.

== Technical information ==
=== Subchannels ===
The WKNO TV transmitter is located in Cordova. The station's signal is multiplexed:

Subchannels of WKNO
Subchannel	Res.	Short name	Programming
10.1	1080i	WKNO-HD	PBS
10.2	480i	WKNO-SD	"WKNO 2" (World Channel, prime time repeats, Tennessee General Assembly)
10.3	480i	KNO-KID	PBS Kids

=== Analog-to-digital conversion ===
WKNO began broadcasting in digital on August 3, 2004. The station ended regular programming on its analog signal, over VHF channel 10, on May 1, 2009. The switch was earlier than the June 12 deadline for full-service stations because the foundation wished to save money and stop paying for the electricity necessary to broadcast in analog and digital simultaneously. The station's digital signal remained on its pre-transition UHF channel 29, using virtual channel 10.
