= List of television stations in New York =

This is a list of broadcast television stations licensed to cities in the U.S. state of New York.

== Full-power ==
- Stations are arranged by media market served and channel position.

Full-power television stations in New York
Media market	Station	Channel	Primary affiliation(s)	Notes	Refs
Albany–Schenectady	WRGB	6	CBS		
Albany–Schenectady	WTEN	10	ABC		
Albany–Schenectady	WNYT	13	NBC		
Albany–Schenectady	WMHT	17	PBS		
Albany–Schenectady	WXXA-TV	23	Fox		
Albany–Schenectady	WCWN	45	The CW, CBS on 45.3		
Albany–Schenectady	WYPX-TV	55	Ion Television		
Binghamton	WBNG-TV	12	CBS, The CW on 12.2		
Binghamton	WIVT	34	ABC, NBC on 34.2		
Binghamton	WICZ-TV	40	Fox, MyNetworkTV on 40.2		
Binghamton	WSKG-TV	46	PBS		
Buffalo	WGRZ	2	NBC		
Buffalo	WIVB-TV	4	CBS		
Buffalo	WKBW-TV	7	ABC		
Buffalo	WNED-TV	17	PBS		
Buffalo	WNLO	23	The CW		
Buffalo	WNYB	26	TCT	(Note: Licensed to Jamestown, New York.)	
Buffalo	WUTV	29	Fox		
Buffalo	WNYO-TV	49	MyNetworkTV		
Buffalo	WPXJ-TV	51	Ion Television	(Note: Licensed to Batavia, New York.)	
Buffalo	WBBZ-TV	67	Independent/MeTV	(Note: Licensed to Springville, New York.)	
Elmira–Corning	WETM-TV	18	NBC, The CW on 18.2		
Elmira–Corning	WSKA	30	PBS	(Note: Satellite of WSKG-TV.)	
Elmira–Corning	WENY-TV	36	ABC, CBS on 36.2, Independent on 36.3		
Elmira–Corning	WYDC	48	Fox, MyNetworkTV on 48.2		
New York City	WCBS-TV	2	CBS		
New York City	WNBC	4	NBC		
New York City	WNYW	5	Fox		
New York City	WABC-TV	7	ABC		
New York City	WPIX	11	The CW		
New York City	WLIW	21	PBS	(Note: Licensed to Garden City, New York.)	
New York City	WNYE-TV	25	Educational independent		
New York City	WPXN-TV	31	Ion Television		
New York City	WRNN-TV	48	Shop LC	(Note: Licensed to New Rochelle, New York.)	
New York City	WLNY-TV	55	Independent	(Note: Licensed to Riverhead, New York.)	
New York City	WFTY-DT	67	True Crime Network, UniMás on 67.2, Univision on 67.3	(Note: Licensed to Smithtown, New York.)	
Norwood	WNPI-DT	18	PBS	(Note: Satellite of WPBS-TV.)	
Rochester	WROC-TV	8	CBS		
Rochester	WHEC-TV	10	NBC		
Rochester	WHAM-TV	13	ABC, The CW on 13.2		
Rochester	WXXI-TV	21	PBS		
Rochester	WUHF	31	Fox		
Syracuse	WSTM-TV	3	NBC, The CW on 3.2		
Syracuse	WTVH	5	Roar		
Syracuse	WSYR-TV	9	ABC		
Syracuse	WKOF	15	CBS		
Syracuse	WCNY-TV	24	PBS		
Syracuse	WNYI	52	Daystar	(Note: Licensed to Ithaca, New York.)	
Syracuse	WSPX-TV	56	Ion Television		
Syracuse	WSYT	68	Fox, MyNetworkTV on 43.1		
Utica	WKTV	2	NBC, CBS on 2.2, Independent on 2.3		
Utica	WUTR	20	ABC, MyNetworkTV on 20.2		
Utica	WFXV	33	Fox, The CW on 33.2		
Watertown	WWNY-TV	7	CBS, Fox on 7.2	(Note: Licensed to Carthage, New York.)	
Watertown	WPBS-TV	16	PBS		
Watertown	WWTI	50	ABC, The CW on 50.2		
~Burlington, Vermont	WPTZ	5	NBC	(Note: Licensed to Plattsburgh, New York.)	
~Burlington, Vermont	WYCI	40	MyNetworkTV	(Note: Licensed to Saranac Lake, New York.)	
~Burlington, Vermont	WCFE-TV	57	PBS		

== Low-power ==
Low-power television stations in New York
Media market	Station	Channel	Network	Notes	Refs
Albany–Schenectady	WZPJ-LD	4	France24		
Albany–Schenectady	WYBN-LD	14	Various	(Note: Licensed to Cobleskill, New York.)	
Albany–Schenectady	WEPT-CD	15	Various	(Note: Licensed to Peekskill, New York.)	
Albany–Schenectady	WFNY-CD	16	Independent	(Note: Licensed to Gloversville, New York.)	
Albany–Schenectady	WVBG-LD	25	Various	(Note: Licensed to Greenwich, New York.)	
Albany–Schenectady	WNCE-CD	31	YTA TV	(Note: Licensed to Glens Falls, New York.)	
Albany–Schenectady	WUCB-LD	32	Religious independent		
Albany–Schenectady	WNGN-LD	38	[Blank]	(Note: Licensed to Troy, New York.)	
Albany–Schenectady	WNGX-LD	42	Silent		
Binghamton	WBGH-CD	20	NBC		
Buffalo	WBUO-LD	30	Retro TV		
Buffalo	WWHC-LD	20	Various	(Note: Licensed to Olean, New York.)	
Buffalo	WVTT-CD	34	Various		
Buffalo	WBXZ-LD	56	Various		
Elmira–Corning	W29EZ-D	28	3ABN		
Elmira–Corning	WJKP-LD	39	MyNetworkTV		
Elmira–Corning	W15EG-D	41	[Blank]		
New York City	WNYZ-LD (Not Active)	6	Korean programming		
New York City	WDYA-LD	10	Diya TV		
New York City	WNDT-CD	14	FNX	(Note: Licensed to Manhattan, New York.)	
New York City	WEPT-CD	15	Independent		
New York City	W29FY-D	16	Various		
New York City	W30FI-D	16	Various		
New York City	W09CZ-D	17	France24	(Note: Licensed to Roslyn, New York.)	
New York City	WLIG-LD	17	[Blank]	(Note: Licensed to Plainview, New York.)	
New York City	WHTV-LD	18	Various		
New York City	W20CQ-D	20	Hope Channel	(Note: Licensed to Hempstead, New York.)	
New York City	W02CY-D	24	Various		
New York City	WASA-LD	24	Hot 97 TV	(Note: Licensed to Port Jervis, New York.)	
New York City	WYNB-LD	30	Intrigue TV	(Note: Licensed to Ellenville, New York.)	
New York City	WXNY-LD	32	Daystar		
New York City	WNWT-LD	37	MeTV		
New York City	WPXU-LD	38	Daystar	(Note: Licensed to Amityville, New York.)	
New York City	WNYN-LD	39	Independent		
New York City	WKOB-LD	42	Various		
New York City	WMBQ-CD	46	FNX		
New York City	WDYJ-LD	60	Diya TV		
Rochester	WGCE-CD	6	Various		
Rochester	WAWW-LD	30	HSN		
Rochester	WNIB-LD	42	TCT		
Rochester	WBGT-CD	46	MyNetworkTV		
Syracuse	WNDR-LD	4	[Blank]	(Note: Licensed to Auburn, New York.)	
Syracuse	WQSE-LD	6	[Blank]	(Note: Licensed to Westvale, New York.)	
Syracuse	WONO-CD	11	Various		
Syracuse	WZLH-LD	16	[Blank]		
Syracuse	WTVU-CD	22	Cornerstone TV		
Syracuse	WWLF-LD	35	LATV		
Syracuse	WMJQ-CD	40	MeTV		
Syracuse	WBLZ-LD	49	Various		
Syracuse	WHSU-CD	51	The Walk TV		
Utica	WPNY-LD	11	MyNetworkTV		
Utica	WVVC-LD	40	Antenna TV		
Watertown	WNGJ-LD	20	[Blank]	(Note: Licensed to Ogdensburg, New York.)	
Watertown	WNYF-CD	28	Fox		
Watertown	WVNC-LD	45	NBC		

== Translators ==
Television station translators in New York
Media market	Station	Channel	Translating	Notes	Refs
Albany–Schenectady	WNYT (DRT)	13	WNYT		
Albany–Schenectady	W21CP-D	13	WNYT		
Albany–Schenectady	WNYT (DRT)	13	WNYT		
Albany–Schenectady	WRGB-KT	45	WCWN	(Note: Licensed to Kingston, New York.)	
Albany–Schenectady	WRGB-GF	45	WCWN		
Buffalo	WBNF-CD	15	WNYB		
Elmira–Corning	W19ET-D	48	WYDC	(Note: Licensed to Bath, New York.)	
Elmira–Corning	W26BF-D	48	WYDC		
Elmira–Corning	WECY-LD	48	WYDC		
New York City	WCBS-TV (DRT)	2	WCBS-TV		
New York City	WNYJ-LD	15	WEPT-CD	(Note: Licensed to Newburgh, New York.)	
New York City	W25FA-D	15	WEPT-CD		
New York City	W05DJ-D	15	WEPT-CD		
New York City	W23ER-D	17	WMHT	(Note: Licensed to Poughkeepsie, New York.)	
New York City	WZPK-LD	29	WYNB-LD	(Note: Licensed to Highland, New York.)	
Norwood	WWNY-CD	28	WWNY-TV; WNYF-CD		
Norwood	WVNV-LD	45	WVNC-LD	(Note: Licensed to Potsdam, New York.)	
Rochester	W17ED-D	46	WBGT-CD	(Note: Licensed to Hornell and Alfred, New York.)	
Syracuse	WMJQ-CD	40	WTVU-CD		
Syracuse	W34FR-D	36	WENY-TV		
Syracuse	WDSS-LD	38	WNYI		
Syracuse	WNYS-CD	68	WSYT		
Utica	WWDG-CD	12	WTVU-CD		
Utica	WTKO-CD	13	WTVU-CD	(Note: Licensed to Oneida, New York.)	
Utica	W22DO-D	24	WCNY-TV		
Watertown	WVNG-LD	9	WVNC-LD	(Note: Licensed to Gouverneur, New York.)	
Watertown	WTKJ-LD	19	WVNC-LD		
~Burlington, VT	W25AT-D	25	WCFE-TV	(Note: Licensed to Tupper Lake, New York.)	
~Burlington, VT	W29EW-D	34	WCFE-TV	(Note: Licensed to Willsboro, New York.)	

== Defunct ==
- WBES-TV Buffalo (1953)
- WBUF Buffalo (1953–1958)
- WCDA Albany (1954–1963)
- WCDB Hagaman (1956–1958)
- WECT Elmira (1953–1954)
- WKNY-TV Kingston (1954–1956)
- WNYI Ithaca–Syracuse (2002–2009)
- WNYP-TV Jamestown (1967–1969)
- WNYS-TV Syracuse (1989–2020)
- WTJA Jamestown (1988–1991)
- WTRI Albany (1954–1955, 1956–1963)
- WTVE Elmira (1953–1954, 1956–1957)
- WVET-TV Rochester (shared time with WHEC-TV, 1953–1961)

== Bibliography ==
- Charles A. Alicoate, ed. (1960), "Television Stations: New York", Radio Annual and Television Year Book, New York: Radio Daily Corp., OCLC 10512206
