= WEPT-CD =

Television station in Peekskill, New York

WEPT-CD and W20FF-D
WEPT-CD: Peekskill, New York; W20FF-D: Teaneck, New Jersey; United States
- Channels for WEPT-CD: Digital: 28 (UHF), shared with WNYJ-LD; Virtual: 15
- Channels for W20FF-D: Digital: 20 (UHF), shared with WNMF-LD; Virtual: 15

Programming
- Affiliations: 15.1: Independent

Ownership
- Owner: WEPT-CD: Venture Technologies Group, LLC; W20FF-D: Local Media TV New York, LLC

History
- Founded: WEPT-CD: January 24, 1996
- First air date: WEPT-CD: December 1997
- Former call signs: WEPT-CD: W39CE (1997–1998); WVBX-LP (1998–2002); WVBX-CA (2002–2003); WNYA-CA (2003–2013); WEPT-CA (2013–2014); W20FF-D: W38BC (1998); W27CD (1998–2013); W20EF-D (2013–?)
- Former channel number: WEPT-CD: Analog: 39 (UHF, 1997–2003), 15 (UHF, 2003–2014); Digital: 22 (UHF, 2014–2020); W20FF-D: Analog: 38 (UHF, 1998), 27 (UHF, 1998–2013)
- Former affiliations: WEPT-CD: Independent (via WVBG-LP, 1997–1998 and 2000–2001); UPN (via WVBG-LP, 1998–2000; via WNYA, 2003–2006); A1 (via WVBG-LP, 2001–2003); RSN (via WVBG-LP, 2001–2003); MyNetworkTV (via WNYA, 2006–2011); Antenna TV (via WNYA-DT2, 2011–2013); Jewelry TV (201?–202?)

Technical information
- Licensing authority: FCC
- Facility ID: WEPT-CD: 30429; W20FF-D: 74502
- Class: WEPT-CD: CD; W20FF-D: LD
- ERP: WEPT-CD: 15 kW; W20FF-D: 6.02 kW
- HAAT: WEPT-CD: 200.6 m (658 ft); W20FF-D: 260.7 m (855 ft)
- Transmitter coordinates: WEPT-CD: 40°57′39″N 73°55′21″W; W20FF-D: 40°45′8.1″N 73°58′2.1″W

Links
- Public license information: WEPT-CD: Public file; LMS; W20FF-D: Public file; LMS

WEPT-CD (channel 15) is a low-power, Class A independent television station in Peekskill, New York, United States. The station is owned by Venture Technologies Group.

== History ==
The station originated on January 24, 1996, as a construction permit for W02CJ, which was to have operated on channel 2 in Manchester, Vermont, from a tower at the studios of radio station WJAN (95.1 FM, now WVTQ). However, that facility was never built, and later that year owners Ronald and Jan Morlino, who also owned WJAN, transferred W02CJ to Vision 3 Broadcasting, which on May 9, 1997, modified the permit to instead serve Easton, Glens Falls, Hudson Falls, and Saratoga Springs on channel 39 from Willard Mountain, making the station W39CE. The station was designed to be a repeater of WVBG-LP (channel 25) from Albany; however, when channel 39 signed on in December 1997 as an independent station, it was the first of Vision 3's three stations to launch, ahead of W49BU (channel 49, later renamed WVBK-LP; now WHNH-CD channel 2) in Manchester, which signed on in March 1998, and WVBG itself, which debuted in August 1998. Channel 39 became WVBX-LP on April 10, 1998.

On October 5, 1998, WVBX, along with parent station WVBG, became a UPN affiliate; it already carried the UPN Kids block, but the network's prime time programming had previously been seen in the Capital District through secondary affiliations with Fox affiliate WXXA-TV (channel 23) and Pax station WYPX (channel 55), as well as cable carriage of WSBK-TV from Boston. However, from its inception, the station could not get carriage on Time Warner Cable, which chose to continue its carriage of WSBK; this was despite acquiring several sports packages, including Big East football and basketball, the Boston Red Sox (the telecasts of which were dropped following a territorial complaint by the New York Yankees), and the Boston Celtics.

Vision 3 did win must-carry rights in Washington County (in the WVBX coverage area) on December 3, 1999. However, the UPN affiliation ended at the start of 2000 when cable-only "WEDG-TV" (known later as "UPN 4") signed on as a joint operation between Time Warner Cable and WXXA. WVBX would then revert to being an independent station, heavily emphasizing its status as a primarily over-the-air station; that June, Vision 3 put WVBG and WVBX up for sale, and by 2001 much of the station's schedule was taken up by America One and Resort Sports Network programming.

In 2002, a year after parent station WVBG was sold to Wireless Access, Vision 3 was granted a construction permit to move WVBX to channel 15 from a transmitter on the Helderberg Escarpment in New Scotland, near the location of the WVBG transmitter, in effect moving the station to Albany. The new facility was also granted class A status, with the call sign WVBX-CA. On May 22, 2003, Vision 3 sold WVBX to Venture Technologies Group, who took channel 39 off-the-air that June. During this time, Venture built the channel 15 facility, gave it the call letters WNYA-CA on June 30, 2003, and announced that the station would serve as a repeater of WNYA (channel 51) from Pittsfield, Massachusetts, which Venture was in the process of launching; this resulted in the unusual circumstance of a repeater station older than its parent station. Together, the two stations came on the air September 1, 2003, as the Capital District's new UPN affiliate (replacing "WEDG-TV"), operated by Freedom Communications, then-owner of WRGB (channel 6), under a joint sales agreement.

On January 24, 2006, The WB and UPN announced that they would end broadcasting and merge to form a new network, The CW; the new network immediately named WEWB-TV (channel 45, now WCWN) its Capital District affiliate after then-owner Tribune Broadcasting signed a ten-year affiliation deal with the new network on most of its WB stations. On February 22, News Corporation announced that it would start up another new broadcast television network called MyNetworkTV; on March 9, it was announced that WNYA (and in turn WNYA-CA) would join this network, which launched on September 5. A few months after the affiliation change, on December 5, 2006, Freedom Communications purchased WCWN from Tribune, in effect giving it control over three stations in the Capital District; in February 2007, the joint sales agreement with WRGB was terminated, and WNYA moved from WRGB's studios in Niskayuna to a facility in Rotterdam that formerly housed WMHT-FM-TV. In April 2011, WNYA-CA replaced WNYA's main programming with Antenna TV, simulcast from WNYA's second digital subchannel.

On February 25, 2013, Hubbard Broadcasting announced that it would purchase WNYA to form a duopoly with its local NBC affiliate WNYT, for $2.3 million, pending FCC approval. The sale did not include WNYA-CA, which remained with Venture Technologies. Under a clause of the sale of WNYA that required WNYA-CA to use a new call sign that does not feature the letters "N" or "Y", channel 15 became WEPT-CA on March 8, 2013. On May 29, 2013, the FCC approved the sale of WNYA to Hubbard, which was completed July 15; that September, WEPT-CA dropped its WNYA-DT2 simulcast to join AMGTV, moved its transmitter to New Baltimore, and changed its city of license to Kinderhook. Venture then filed on September 25 to construct a digital companion facility on channel 22 broadcasting from Overlook Mountain in Woodstock; the permit was granted on December 23. On December 18, 2014, the station was issued a license for digital operation, with its city of license moving from Kinderhook to Newburgh and its call sign changing to WEPT-CD. The station, which had remained in the Albany television market while licensed to Kinderhook, became part of the New York City market following the move to Newburgh.

On January 10, 2018, WEPT-CD went silent due to antenna and line issues. Per an FCC filing on August 14, 2018, the station resumed operations as of August 7, 2018. On October 22, 2018, WEPT went silent in preparation for the FCC's Phase 4 repack. On March 25, 2020, WEPT-CD filed a Suspension of Operations and Request for Silence STA with the FCC due to what the station called in its filing, "reflective power issues" On September 29, 2020, WEPT-CD resumed operations.

== Subchannels ==
The station's signal is multiplexed:

Subchannels of WEPT-CD and W20FF-D
License	Subchannel	Res.	Short name	Programming
WEPT-CD	15.1	480i	WEPT-CD	Independent
WNYJ-LD	16.1	480i	WNYJ-LD	Jewelry TV
WNYJ-LD	16.2	480i	WalkTV	The Walk TV
WNYJ-LD	16.3	480i	WNYJ-3	Jewelry TV
WNYJ-LD	16.4	480i	AceTV	Ace TV
WNMF-LD	22.1	480i	WNMF-LD	Jewelry TV
