= WNYA =

Television station in Pittsfield, Massachusetts

- Pittsfield, Massachusetts; Albany–Schenectady–Troy, New York; United States
- City: Pittsfield, Massachusetts
- Channels: Digital: 7 (VHF); Virtual: 51
- Branding: My4 Albany (cable channel)

Programming
- Affiliations: 51.1: Independent with MyNetworkTV / NBC (alternate); for others, see § Subchannels

Ownership
- Owner: Hubbard Broadcasting; (WNYT-TV, LLC)
- Sister stations: WNYT

History
- Founded: February 3, 2003
- First air date: September 1, 2003
- Former channel numbers: Analog: 51 (UHF, 2003–2009); Digital: 13 (VHF, 2009–2020)
- Former affiliations: UPN (2003–2006)
- Call sign meaning: New York, Albany

Technical information
- Licensing authority: FCC
- Facility ID: 136751
- ERP: 23 kW
- HAAT: 437.2 m (1,434.4 ft)
- Transmitter coordinates: 42°37′31.3″N 74°0′36.7″W

Links
- Public license information: Public file; LMS
- Website: wnyt.com/my4

WNYA (channel 51, cable channel 4) is a television station licensed to Pittsfield, Massachusetts, United States, serving New York's Capital District. It is programmed primarily as an independent station, but maintains a secondary affiliation with MyNetworkTV. WNYA is owned by Hubbard Broadcasting alongside NBC affiliate WNYT (channel 13). The two stations share studios on North Pearl Street in Menands (with an Albany postal address); WNYA's transmitter is located on the Helderberg Escarpment west of New Salem.

The station uses its main cable channel position of 4 on Charter Spectrum and Verizon Fios for marketing purposes as My 4 Albany, only mentioning their actual channel number on-air during maintenance sign-off disclosures. Despite Pittsfield being WNYA's city of license, the station maintains no physical presence there.

== History ==
=== Establishment of channel 51 ===
What today is WNYA can indirectly trace its history to WVUW, an un-built station on channel 51 in Pittsfield. WVUW was granted a construction permit in 1984, but was deleted by the Federal Communications Commission (FCC) in 1990. In October 1996, Pappas Telecasting applied for a new permit for this allocation; however, in 2001, the FCC placed the channel up for auction. In addition to Pappas, which by then planned to use the station as an Azteca América affiliate, bidders included Hubbard Broadcasting, Equity Broadcasting, the Trinity Broadcasting Network, and Venture Technologies Group. When the auction took place in February 2002, Venture Technologies ended up with the winning bid for $1.3 million. The FCC granted the construction permit and the WNYA call sign to Venture a year later. To accommodate the new WNYA, WNYT moved its Adams translator, which had broadcast on channel 51 since 1984, to channel 38.

=== UPN Capital Region ===
In February 2003, Venture Technologies signed a joint sales agreement (JSA) with Freedom Communications, then-owner of CBS affiliate WRGB (channel 6); this allowed WNYA to operate from WRGB's studios in Niskayuna. Soon afterward, WNYA secured an affiliation with UPN, replacing "WEDG-TV", a cable-only station operated as a partnership of WXXA-TV (channel 23) and Time Warner Cable.

On May 22, 2003, Venture purchased WVBX-LP (channel 39) in Easton from Vision 3 Broadcasting, a station that a year earlier had been granted a construction permit to upgrade to class A service and move to channel 15 from a transmitter in the Helderberg Mountains in New Scotland, in effect moving WVBX to Albany. Venture took channel 39 off-the-air that June, built the channel 15 facility, gave it the call letters WNYA-CA on June 30, 2003, and announced that the station would serve as a WNYA repeater; this created the unusual circumstance of a repeater station older than its parent station, as WVBX had signed on in 1997 as part of a network of low-power stations based at WVBG-LP (channel 25) in Albany, which itself served as the Capital District's UPN affiliate from 1998 until the launch of "WEDG-TV" in 2000.

On September 1, 2003, WNYA launched using the branding "UPN Capital Region." The main signal, WNYA, had an analog transmitter northwest of Pittsfield on Berry Mountain. It became the first full-powered, over-the-air UPN affiliate in the Capital District. In addition to UPN programming, WNYA occasionally carried CBS programming preempted by WRGB, including US Open telecasts that conflicted with WRGB's broadcast of the Jerry Lewis MDA Labor Day Telethon.

From its sign-on, WNYA took the cable channel position of "WEDG-TV" on Time Warner, Charter (in Rensselaer and Columbia counties), and independent Mid-Hudson Cablevision (in Greene County). Adelphia would replace WSBK-TV from Boston with WNYA at the start of 2004, with other providers including DirecTV and Dish Network adding the station later that year.

=== MyNetworkTV ===
On January 24, 2006, The WB and UPN announced that they would end broadcasting and merge to form a new network, The CW; the new network immediately named WEWB-TV (channel 45, now WCWN) its Capital District affiliate after then-owner Tribune Broadcasting signed a ten-year affiliation deal with the new network on most of its WB stations. On February 22, News Corporation announced that it would start up another new broadcast television network called MyNetworkTV; on March 9, it was announced that WNYA would join this network. After having not branded with a channel number during its UPN affiliation, the station chose to call itself "My TV 4 Albany" after its channel position on Time Warner Cable systems. Ironically, nowhere in Berkshire County, Massachusetts is WNYA currently on channel 4; in North Adams, that channel is the spot where Boston's CBS affiliate WBZ-TV is located. After MyNetworkTV's launch on September 5, 2006, WNYA aired the last two weeks of UPN programming from 1 to 3 a.m. from Tuesday to Saturday.

A few months after the affiliation change, on December 5, 2006, Freedom Communications purchased WCWN from Tribune, in effect giving it control over three stations in the Capital District. In February 2007, the joint sales agreement with WRGB was terminated, and WNYA moved to a facility in Rotterdam that formerly housed WMHT-FM-TV.

In December 2007, WNYA reached an agreement to carry the New York Yankees' over-the-air television package, which had previously been carried on WXXA-TV. The station hired Dan Murphy, a former WTEN (channel 10) sports anchor and WOFX (980 AM) host, to host a local pregame show for Yankee telecasts and other local sports broadcasts. Yankee broadcasts remained on WNYA through the 2012 season, after which they migrated to WCWN and WRGB.

On April 18, 2008, WNYA launched its high definition channel on Time Warner Cable in Albany, even though it was not able to transmit its digital signal over the air until 2009. This coincided with the first Yankee baseball broadcast it had the rights to. WNYA switched to digital broadcasting as part of the transition on June 12, 2009. The Albany repeater, WNYA-CA, had a construction permit to perform a "flash-cut" to a low-power digital signal; due to its Class A status, it was not mandated to make the transition until 2015. Around April 20, 2011, WNYA launched its first digital subchannel in the form of Tribune Broadcasting's Antenna TV over Channel 51.2. The new subchannel also began to be simulcast on WNYA-CA in place of WNYA's main programming.

=== Acquisition by Hubbard ===
On February 25, 2013, Hubbard Broadcasting announced that it would purchase WNYA to form a duopoly with its local NBC affiliate WNYT, for $2.3 million, pending FCC approval. As the Capital Region does not have enough full-power stations to legally permit a duopoly, Hubbard sought a failed station waiver to acquire the station; an avenue that rival CBS affiliate WRGB had used in purchasing CW affiliate WCWN in 2006. Venture had put WNYA up for sale in 2009, but no other potential buyers came forward. The sale did not include class-A station WNYA-CA, which remained with Venture Technologies. Under a clause of the sale of WNYA that required WNYA-CA to use a new call sign that does not feature the letters "N" or "Y", that station became WEPT-CA on March 8, 2013. On May 29, 2013, the FCC approved the sale of WNYA to Hubbard, with Venture retaining ownership of WEPT-CA. The sale was consummated on July 15. WEPT-CA dropped its simulcast of WNYA-DT2 and switched to AMGTV in September 2013, ending its association with WNYA. On December 31, 2015, WNYA added Decades on subchannel 51.3. On November 1, 2017, WNYA replaced Antenna TV with Light TV on subchannel 51.2.

== Newscasts ==
On April 17, 2006, WRGB began producing an hour-long 7 a.m. newscast on WNYA. The newscast moved to WCWN shortly after Freedom's purchase of that station.

With Hubbard's acquisition of WNYA, the company indicated that it would eventually produce newscasts on the station with an increased emphasis on news for the Berkshires. WNYT once operated a Berkshire County bureau in Pittsfield but closed it after the Great Recession. The newscast premiered September 16, 2013, with the title NewsChannel 13 Live at 10 on My 4 Albany. The show airs weeknights for a half hour in a fast-paced format and includes a "Berkshire Moment" segment featuring western Massachusetts-specific stories with the assistance of The Berkshire Eagle. It competes with the firmly established hour long broadcast seen every night on WXXA (produced by WTEN) and another sixty-minute news show on WCWN (a weeknight-only production by WRGB).

== Technical information ==
=== Subchannels ===
The station's signal is multiplexed:

Subchannels of WNYA
Subchannel	Res.	Short name	Programming
51.1	1080i	WNYA-HD	Main WNYA programming
51.2	480i	Movies	Movies!
51.3	480i	CatchyC	Catchy Comedy
51.4	480i	H&I	Heroes & Icons

Former DT2 logo, to 2017.

=== Analog-to-digital conversion ===
WNYA shut down its analog signal, over UHF channel 51, on June 12, 2009, the official date on which full-power television stations in the United States transitioned from analog to digital broadcasts under federal mandate. The station "flash-cut" its digital signal into operation on VHF channel 13, using virtual channel 51.

== See also ==
- Channel 4 branded TV stations in the United States
- Channel 13 digital TV stations in the United States
- Channel 51 virtual TV stations in the United States
