= Dick Wood (journalist) =

American journalist (died 2021)

Richard "Dick" Wood (died 2021) was an American journalist.

== Biography ==
Wood was born in Massachusetts, U.S. He began his broadcasting career in the U.S. Army and transitioned to commercial radio in 1954. After working at several radio stations, he moved to television at WJAR-TV and later joined WTEN in 1973. His distinctive voice was often featured in local commercials. After a career in television, he worked in local jazz radio.

Wood received Congressional recognition for his reporting fairness and won several journalism awards. He was involved in disability-focused telethons and collected antique items and Frank Sinatra memorabilia. Wood died at age 91.
