= WNGF =

WNGF may refer to:

- WNGF-LD, a low-power television station (channel 26) licensed to serve Potsdam, New York, United States; see List of television stations in New York (state)
- WNGG-LD, a low-power television station (channel 9) licensed to serve Gouverneur, New York, which held the call signs WNGF-LP or WNGF-LD from 2015 to 2023; see List of television stations in New York (state)
- WGLG, a radio station (89.9 FM) licensed to serve Swanton, Vermont, United States, which held the call sign WNGF from 2009 to 2014
