= Norm Sebastian =

- Born: Norman Sebastian; June 19, 1956; Norwich, Connecticut, US
- Died: December 22, 2000 (aged 44) [Averill Park, NY], US
- Occupation: Meteorologist
- Years active: 1979–2000

Norm Sebastian (June 19, 1956 – December 22, 2000) was a television meteorologist whose credentials included stops at Universal Weather (White Plains, New York); The Weather Channel; and WNYT in Albany, New York.

Born in Norwich, Connecticut, Sebastian attended Lyndon State College in Lyndonville, Vermont, where he obtained his degree in meteorology. After working as a meteorologist at Westchester County Airport in White Plains, New York, Sebastian became one of the initial meteorologists at The Weather Channel when that network launched in 1982. Three years later, Sebastian followed Herb Stevens to WNYT and became the environmental reporter and weekend meteorologist at that station. In 1990, Sebastian was promoted to the weekday morning and noon newscasts which he held until his death.

A scholarship, the Norman Sebastian Scholarship in Meteorology, was named for him at his old college, Lyndon State College in Vermont.
