= WXXA-TV =

Television station in Albany, New York

- Albany–Schenectady–Troy, New York; United States
- City: Albany, New York
- Channels: Digital: 8 (VHF); Virtual: 23
- Branding: Fox 23

Programming
- Affiliations: 23.1: Fox; for others, see § Subchannels

Ownership
- Owner: Mission Broadcasting, Inc.
- Operator: Nexstar Media Group
- Sister stations: WTEN

History
- First air date: July 30, 1982
- Former channel numbers: Analog: 23 (UHF, 1982–2009); Digital: 7 (VHF, 2005–2020)
- Former affiliations: Independent (1982–1986); UPN (secondary, 1995–1998)

Technical information
- Licensing authority: FCC
- Facility ID: 11970
- ERP: 22 kW
- HAAT: 437.2 m (1,434 ft)
- Transmitter coordinates: 42°37′31.3″N 74°0′36.7″W

Links
- Public license information: Public file; LMS
- Website: www.news10.com/fox-23/

WXXA-TV (channel 23) is a television station licensed to Albany, New York, United States, serving the Capital District as an affiliate of the Fox network. It is owned by Mission Broadcasting and operated by Nexstar Media Group alongside ABC affiliate WTEN (channel 10). The two stations share studios on Northern Boulevard in Albany's Bishop's Gate section; WXXA-TV's transmitter is located on the Helderberg Escarpment west of New Salem.

WXXA-TV is the only commercial television station in Albany that has never changed its primary network affiliation or call letters.

== History ==
WXXA signed on July 30, 1982 and aired an analog signal on UHF channel 23. It was the Capital District's first independent station, as well as the first new commercial station to launch in the market since WTRI (channel 35), forerunner of WNYT (channel 13), launched 28 years earlier. The Capital District had a fairly long wait for an independent station, considering its size. On paper, it had been large enough to support an independent since the late 1960s. However, the Capital District is a fairly large market geographically, stretching across a large swath of east-central New York, as well as portions of southwestern Vermont and western Massachusetts. Much of this area is very mountainous, particularly in the northern portion. UHF stations have never covered large areas or rugged terrain very well. By the late 1970s, cable and satellite—then as now, a must for acceptable television in much of this market—had gained enough penetration for an independent to be viable.

A construction permit had been issued for channel 23 in the 1950s with the calls WPTR-TV; that permit was canceled in 1960. Rumors had previously abounded that NBC would move its programming to the new channel 23 after WRGB (channel 6) switched to CBS in 1981. However, the network ended up affiliating with WNYT.

The station was owned by Albany TV 23, Inc., a group of investors led by president and station manager Jim Boaz, Hollywood director Arthur Penn, and former FDIC director William Seidman. Through Penn, it was able to secure financing from movie production company Orion Pictures. WXXA was a typical general-entertainment independent airing cartoons, movies, sports, and first-run syndicated programs. The station also carried business news programming from the Financial News Network.

In July 1986, WXXA-TV agreed to become a charter affiliate of Fox, which launched on October 9. Initially, like most early Fox affiliates, WXXA-TV still programmed itself as an independent. Fox only aired one program (The Late Show Starring Joan Rivers) until April 1987 and even then would not present an entire week's worth of programming until the 1993–94 season. Shortly after Fox's launch, on November 4, 1986, Albany TV 23 sold the station to Heritage Broadcasting Group, a Detroit-based company (unrelated to the similarly named Heritage Communications and Heritage Media) that was also in the process of acquiring WWTV in Cadillac, Michigan) for $10.1 million. The station picked up programming from the Prime Time Entertainment Network (PTEN) block in 1993.

In 1994, Heritage sold the station to Clear Channel Communications (now iHeartMedia) for $25.5 million, predating Clear Channel's sizable expansion of television assets in the Northeast in the following years. Clear Channel soon moved WXXA from its original studios on Central Avenue/NYS Route 5 in Albany (now a car dealership) to an expanded facility on Corporate Circle in Albany's Dunes section).

When UPN launched on January 16, 1995, WXXA aired programming from UPN off-hours on weekends. Cable viewers in virtually the entire market were also able to watch UPN in pattern on WSBK-TV in Boston, which had been available on cable in the area for decades. WXXA's secondary affiliation ended in 1998, when UPN signed WYPX (channel 55) as its new secondary affiliate and low-power WVBG-LP (channel 25) as a primary affiliate. The network was picked up again by WXXA after Clear Channel, in partnership with Time Warner Cable, launched cable-only affiliate "WEDG-TV" in January 2000. Eventually known on-air as "UPN 4" after its channel location, "WEDG" signed off in August 2003 concurrent with the sign-on of over-the-air UPN affiliate WNYA (channel 51), which was operated by WRGB.

WXXA-DT began airing on VHF channel 7 on December 20, 2005. A combination of objections from analog co-channels WABC-TV (in New York City) and WWNY-TV (in Watertown), whose signals reach the fringes of the Albany area, was the primary reason for the late and delayed sign-on. On April 20, 2007, Clear Channel entered into an agreement to sell its entire television station group to Providence Equity Partners' Newport Television (the deal closed in March 2008).

On July 19, 2012, Newport Television announced the sale of 22 of its 27 stations to the Nexstar Broadcasting Group, Sinclair Broadcast Group and Cox Media Group. While most of WXXA-TV's New York State sisters were sold to Nexstar, that company opted not to buy channel 23; Sinclair could not purchase WXXA-TV because it already owned WRGB and CW affiliate WCWN (channel 45). While Nexstar and Sinclair passed on buying WXXA, the station eventually found a new owner on July 27, 2012, when Newport Television announced the sale of the station to Shield Media, LLC (owned by White Knight Broadcasting Vice President Sheldon Galloway) for $19.2 million. Shield then entered into a shared services agreement with Young Broadcasting, then-owners of WTEN. The FCC granted the transaction on October 23, and it was finalized on December 14. After consummation of the sale, WXXA moved from its Corporate Circle facility into WTEN's studios on March 23, 2013.

On November 8, 2013, Media General shareholders approved the company's merger with New Young Broadcasting, which was completed on November 12. The merged company kept the Media General name, and continued its agreements with Shield Media. More than two years later, on January 27, 2016, it was announced that the Nexstar Broadcasting Group would buy Media General for $4.6 billion. The operations of WXXA and outright ownership of WTEN became part of "Nexstar Media Group." Upon the sale's closure on January 17, 2017, the deal reunited WXXA with its former Newport sister stations that were sold to Nexstar in 2012.

On August 21, 2020, it was announced that Mission Broadcasting would acquire WXXA. The acquisition was completed on November 23.

=== WXXA-DT2 ===
WXXA's second digital subchannel has had a number of affiliations over the years. In January 2007, Clear Channel launched a digital-only network known as The Variety Channel. The service aired classic television shows (similar to the Retro Television Network), auto showcase programming and various home improvement programs. The service was shut down on January 5, 2009, with WXXA switching over to Untamed Sports TV. This was followed by a switch on April 15, 2011, to the music video network TheCoolTV, which was then dropped sometime in 2012 for ZUUS Country. Finally on January 1, 2015, Shield leased the channel to Capital District Off-Track Betting for their internally originated network, Capital OTB TV.

== News operation ==
On October 8, 1996, the station established a news department and began airing a nightly half-hour prime time newscast known as Fox News at 10. It was not the time slot's first show in the market, as WMHQ (now WCWN) launched a WNYT-produced broadcast earlier in the year; in 1998, that production was canceled due to a lack of support, leaving WXXA as the only outlet for a prime time show.

Filling a niche in local newscasts, its prime time broadcast was expanded on weeknights to an hour on September 4, 2000, and renamed Fox 23 News at 10. Upon launching the newscast, WXXA was successful in the time slot with high ratings and viewership, though it struggled in other timeslots competing directly with Albany's big three stations.

On January 10, 2000, the station took on the area's big three outlets for the first time with the launch of Fox 23 News at 6:30. This show offered a local alternative to the national news broadcasts seen in the time slot. This was followed on March 26, 2001, by another show weeknights at 6 p.m. that directly competed with the other stations.

A change in upper management led to a realignment of early weeknight shows with the 6:30 p.m. broadcast moving to 5 p.m. in September 2002 and an expansion to an hour. Fox 23 News at 6 would eventually be dropped on June 27, 2003, due to low ratings and a re-focus on the success of its flagship 10 p.m. show by putting a significant investment in its news operation beginning in late 2003. The biggest move was the signing of former WNYT news anchor John Gray. Additional resources and capabilities were added to the station behind the scenes as well as on-the-air.

On April 17, 2006, it was announced WNYA would begin airing an hour-long extension of WRGB's weekday morning show from 7 until 8. This action could be seen as a preemptive move by WRGB to fend off a challenge by WXXA, which had announced its own plans to launch a weekday morning newscast two weeks earlier. The actual launch of Fox 23 News Mornings occurred September 18, 2006, and it initially ran for three hours from 5 until 8. WRGB subsequently moved the sixty-minute extension of its morning show from WNYA to WCWN, and in 2008 began producing a 10 p.m. newscast for that station, giving WXXA its first challenger in the time slot in a decade. WXXA reduced its weekday morning broadcast to a two-hour format (from 6 until 8) in Summer 2009 due to low viewership.

A final addition to newscast offerings on WXXA occurred June 29, 2009, when it launched a half-hour broadcast weeknights at 11 following a national trend by other Fox affiliates. Although Fox 23 News at 10 has remained popular with viewers, its weekday morning show and Fox 23 News at 11 continued to struggle in the ratings against long running newscasts on competing stations. Fox 23 News at 5 (seen on weeknights) was eventually cut to a half-hour for that same reason. In 2012, Fox 23 News A.M. was moved to the 7 to 9 time slot. WXXA was the last remaining news department in the Capital District that continued to broadcast local news in 4:3 standard definition, and it never upgraded to high definition or 16:9 widescreen during the time that the newscasts were produced in-house.

With the consolidation of WXXA with WTEN, the ABC affiliate took over production of channel 23's newscasts. The two stations' reporting staffs were merged immediately following Shield Media's purchase of WXXA was completed. On January 24, 2013, WXXA discontinued its weeknight 5 and 11 p.m. newscasts, in order to focus more on the morning and 10 p.m. newscasts; in an announcement on its Facebook page; the station redirected viewers of the canceled newscasts to the WTEN newscasts in those time slots. The weekday morning (7–9 a.m.) and nightly 10 p.m. newscasts, which do not compete against WTEN's newscasts, remain on the station.

On March 23, the consolidation was completed when all newscasts began originating from WTEN's studios produced in high definition. WXXA simulcasts WTEN's weekday morning show from 6 to 7 a.m. From 7 to 9 a.m., WTEN produces a newscast for WXXA as a local complement to Good Morning America. During weather forecasts, the station features live NOAA National Weather Service NEXRAD weather radar data from four regional sites including one locally on Woodstock Road south of East Berne.

== Technical information ==
WXXA's coverage area (primary in dark red, secondary in light pink).

=== Subchannels ===
The station's signal is multiplexed:

Subchannels of WXXA-TV
Subchannel	Res.	Short name	Programming
23.1	720p	WXXA-HD	Fox
23.2	480i	WXXA-OT	Capital OTB TV
23.3	480i	WXXA-GR	Grit
23.4	480i	Rewind	Rewind TV
23.5	480i	TCN	True Crime Network

=== Analog-to-digital conversion ===
WXXA-TV shut down its analog signal, over UHF channel 23, on June 12, 2009, the official date on which full-power television stations in the United States transitioned from analog to digital broadcasts under federal mandate. The station's digital signal remained on its pre-transition VHF channel 7, using virtual channel 23. During the 2019 digital television repack, WXXA moved from VHF channel 7 to channel 8.
