= WCWN =

Television station in Schenectady, New York

ATSC 3.0 station
- Schenectady–Albany–Troy, New York; United States
- City: Schenectady, New York
- Channels: Digital: 22 (UHF); Virtual: 45
- Branding: CW 15 (cable channel)

Programming
- Affiliations: 45.1: The CW / CBS (alternate); 45.2: Charge!; 45.4: The Nest

Ownership
- Owner: Sinclair Broadcast Group; (WCWN Licensee, LLC)
- Sister stations: WRGB

History
- Founded: March 22, 1982
- First air date: December 3, 1984
- Former call signs: WUSV (1982–1987); WMHX (1987–1993); WMHQ (1993–1999); WEWB-TV (1999–2006)
- Former channel numbers: Analog: 45 (UHF, 1984–2009); Digital: 43 (UHF, 2003–2019)
- Former affiliations: Independent (1984–1987); PBS (1987–1991, 1993–1999); Dark (1991–1993); The WB (1999–2006)
- Call sign meaning: The CW Network; -or-; The CW New York State

Technical information
- Licensing authority: FCC
- Facility ID: 73264
- ERP: 750 kW
- HAAT: 426 m (1,398 ft)
- Transmitter coordinates: 42°37′31.3″N 74°0′36.7″W

Links
- Public license information: Public file; LMS
- Website: cwalbany.com

WCWN (channel 45, cable channel 15) is a television station licensed to Schenectady, New York, United States, serving the Capital District as an affiliate of The CW. It is owned by Sinclair Broadcast Group alongside CBS affiliate WRGB (channel 6). The two stations share studios on Balltown Road in Niskayuna, New York; WCWN's transmitter is located on the Helderberg Escarpment west of New Salem. WCWN brands as CW 15 after the cable channel position on Charter Spectrum and Verizon Fios.

== History ==
WCWN originated as an independent station on December 3, 1984, under the call letters WUSV, after its owner, Union Street Video. Chattanooga, Tennessee–based Media Central, a company that helped sign on a handful of independent UHF stations during this time, helped Union Street Video build the station, and also provided services to WUSV. However, it made little headway against the market's original independent, WXXA-TV (channel 23). As with most independent stations in mid-sized markets during that period, it had difficulties from the outset in terms of getting programming with only afternoon cartoons and some reruns getting respectable ratings. Most of the stronger programming went to WXXA, perhaps due in part to one of its founding partners, longtime movie director Arthur Penn, having ties to Hollywood. Also hurting WUSV was the presence of New York City's three independent stations–WNEW-TV (now WNYW), WOR-TV (now WWOR-TV) and WPIX–and Boston's WSBK-TV on cable, which had been the case for more than a decade.

When WXXA joined Fox as a charter affiliate in 1986 (displacing WNYW on cable systems), WUSV had some difficulty filling the void. The Capital District was just barely large enough at the time to support what were essentially two independent stations (WXXA, like other early Fox affiliates, was still programmed as an independent at the time), and there simply wasn't enough programming to go around. Due to continuing financial difficulties, Union Street Video finally gave up in 1987 and sold the station in a fire sale to WMHT Educational Telecommunications on July 24, 1987. Under WMHT's ownership, channel 45 became a secondary PBS member station under the calls WMHX. It was still licensed as a commercial station, but operated as a non-commercial broadcaster—much like Buffalo's WNED-TV (which received an educational license in 2000) and New York City's WNYC-TV (now Ion Television owned-and-operated station WPXN-TV) operated for many years.

This arrangement lasted until 1991 when, due to financial difficulties, WMHX was taken off-the-air. Two years later, the station returned to the air as WMHQ, carrying a large amount of instructional programming alongside repeats and double runs from WMHT. Further financial difficulties at WMHT led to WMHQ being put up for sale in the late 1990s.

Despite WMHT's financial difficulties, WMHQ's commercial license was still very valuable. By this time, the Capital District had grown large enough that a second non-Big Three station was now viable. After a sale to Sinclair Broadcast Group, which intended to make the station a dual UPN/WB affiliate, fell through, Tribune Broadcasting, part-owner of The WB, bought the station in 1999 for $18.5 million. Channel 45's final day of programming as a PBS station was September 5, 1999; after its nightly midnight sign-off, it returned to the air at 6 a.m. the next morning as WB affiliate WEWB-TV, branded on-air as "WB 45". Prior to WEWB's relaunch, WPIX and WGN-TV's national feed had both served as the default WB affiliates for the Capital District. WPIX remained available to cable viewers in Albany until 2002, but was blacked out during WB programming as well as syndicated programming shown exclusively on Albany stations (due to syndication exclusivity rules).

From the station's relaunch as WEWB until December 2006, its master control was located at sister station WB affiliate WLVI-TV in Boston. However, local offices were at Corporate Woods in Albany. WLVI's meteorologists maintained WCWN's weather page. In 2004, WEWB's digital signal signed on-the-air and began broadcasting on UHF channel 43. In 2005, the "WB 45" name was dropped in favor of "Capital Region's WB" at the tail end of a period in which most of Tribune's WB affiliates (minus its VHF and "heritage" stations) were re-branded in the same format.

Eleven years after the births of UPN and The WB on January 24, 2006, it was announced by CBS and Time Warner that The WB would merge with its rival network, UPN, to form The CW. As part of the deal, the newly formed network signed a 10-year affiliation deal with 16 of Tribune's WB stations, including WEWB. In preparation, the station's call letters changed to the current WCWN on May 8. In July 2006, commercials for The CW as well as syndicated fall programming had the station rebranding as "The Capital Region's CW" effective with the network's launch on September 18.

On June 19, 2006, Tribune announced it would sell WCWN to Freedom Communications, owner of CBS affiliate WRGB, for $17 million. The purchase faced review from the Federal Communications Commission (FCC) for much of 2006, since the Capital District has only eight full-power stations—not enough to legally permit a duopoly. However, the FCC granted Freedom a "failed station" waiver for the station's purchase on November 22, clearing the way for Freedom to close on the station on December 6. At that point, all of WCWN's operations were merged into WRGB's facilities in Niskayuna and Freedom began to maintain WCWN's website. The purchase gave the Capital District its first television duopoly. For a short period of time, this essentially gave WRGB control of three stations as it continued its pre-existing joint sales agreement (JSA) with MyNetworkTV affiliate WNYA until February 2007.

Freedom announced on November 2, 2011, that it would bow out of television and sell its stations, including WCWN, to Sinclair Broadcast Group, marking the company's second attempt at acquiring channel 45. Since Freedom had acquired WCWN through a "failed station" waiver, Sinclair requested a similar waiver for the purchase; this was granted on March 13, 2012, as part of the FCC's approval of the transaction. The group deal closed on April 2, 2012.

== Programming ==
Since WCWN is a sister station to WRGB, it is responsible for airing CBS programming when WRGB is unable to or otherwise chooses not to air a program due to weather/emergency updates or local specials. In the past, it has been known to air coverage of the US Open Tennis Championship. When the yearly Jerry Lewis MDA Telethon aired in its original 21 1/2-hour format, WCWN was responsible for airing WRGB's local, syndicated, and network lineup. The station also airs some New York Mets baseball games produced by WPIX in New York City. Games are shown on Friday nights, Saturdays, and Sundays. The arrangement was in place because WCWN was owned by the Tribune Company, WPIX's owner, from 1999 to 2006. Also, WCWN airs WRGB's newscasts at times when CBS Sports programming preempts them (prime examples include the Masters Tournament and the NCAA tournament and Final Four).

=== News operation ===
As WMHQ, it partnered with NBC affiliate WNYT to launch the market's first prime time newscast at 10 which ran from 1996 until 1998. The broadcast was canceled due to a lack of support. At the outset of the station's relaunch as WEWB, there was a chance Tribune would launch a news department possibly with some support from another station in the area. These plans were indefinitely put on hold after Tribune put a news freeze in place and did not consider such a launch to be a priority.

Newscasts would not return to the station until the start of 2007 when Freedom moved an hour-long extension of WRGB's weekday morning show at 7 from WNYA to this channel (currently known as The CW 15 Morning News). This happened because, at the time, WCWN had higher ratings than WNYA. On January 14, 2008, the morning news on WCWN began to be produced in high definition. A day earlier, WRGB became the first station in the market to make the upgrade.

On September 24, 2008, WRGB started airing a weeknight prime time newscast in high definition on WCWN. Originally known as The CBS 6 News 10 at 10 and airing for ten minutes, it featured the top stories of the day along with an updated weather forecast. On October 18, 2010, this was expanded to thirty minutes and renamed The CW 15 News at 10. The format on WCWN became unique to the market and is different compared with newscasts seen on WRGB. There is more fast-paced reporting along with original stories and various features. The weekday morning and prime time newscasts are streamed live on WRGB's website. In the past, WCWN has also occasionally aired that channel's 11 o'clock news during CBS' coverage of NCAA March Madness. Currently, it airs WRGB's Saturday 6 and 11 p.m. and Sunday 6:30 and 11 p.m. newscasts whenever the main channel cannot do so, due to CBS Sports coverage.

== Technical information ==
=== Subchannels ===
The station's ATSC 1.0 channels are carried on the multiplexed signals of other Capital District television stations:

Subchannels provided by WCWN (ATSC 1.0)
Subchannel	Res.	Short name	Programming	ATSC 1.0 host
45.1	1080i	WCWN-HD	The CW	WTEN
45.2	480i	Charge!	Charge!	WRGB
45.4	480i	TheNest	The Nest	WRGB

From its launch in 2006 until October 1, 2007, WCWN offered The Tube on its second digital subchannel and Time Warner digital cable. On November 1, 2008, WCWN-DT2 relaunched as an affiliate of This TV, then shortly thereafter swapped subchannels with WRGB and took Universal Sports. WCWN-DT2 went dark again on January 1, 2012, when Universal Sports moved to cable only status and later shut down altogether.

=== Analog-to-digital conversion ===
WCWN shut down its analog signal, over UHF channel 45, on June 12, 2009, the official date on which full-power television stations in the United States transitioned from analog to digital broadcasts under federal mandate. The station's digital signal remained on its pre-transition UHF channel 43, using virtual channel 45. During the 2019 digital television repack, WCWN relocated from UHF channel 43 as it was no longer allocated to broadcast television and is now broadcasting on UHF channel 22.

=== ATSC 3.0 lighthouse ===
Subchannels of WCWN (ATSC 3.0)
Subchannel	Res.	Short name	Programming
6.1	1080p	WRGB	CBS (WRGB)
6.10	1080p	T2	T2
6.11	1080p	PBTV	Pickleballtv
6.20		GMLOOP	GameLoop
6.21		ROXi	ROXi
10.1	720p	WTEN	ABC (WTEN)
17.1	1080p	WMHT	PBS (WMHT)
23.1	720p	WXXA	Fox (WXXA-TV)
45.1	1080p	WCWN	The CW

Subchannel streamed via the Internet

== See also ==
- Channel 15 branded TV stations in the United States
- Channel 22 digital TV stations in the United States
- Channel 45 virtual TV stations in the United States
