= WNYT =

Television station in Albany, New York

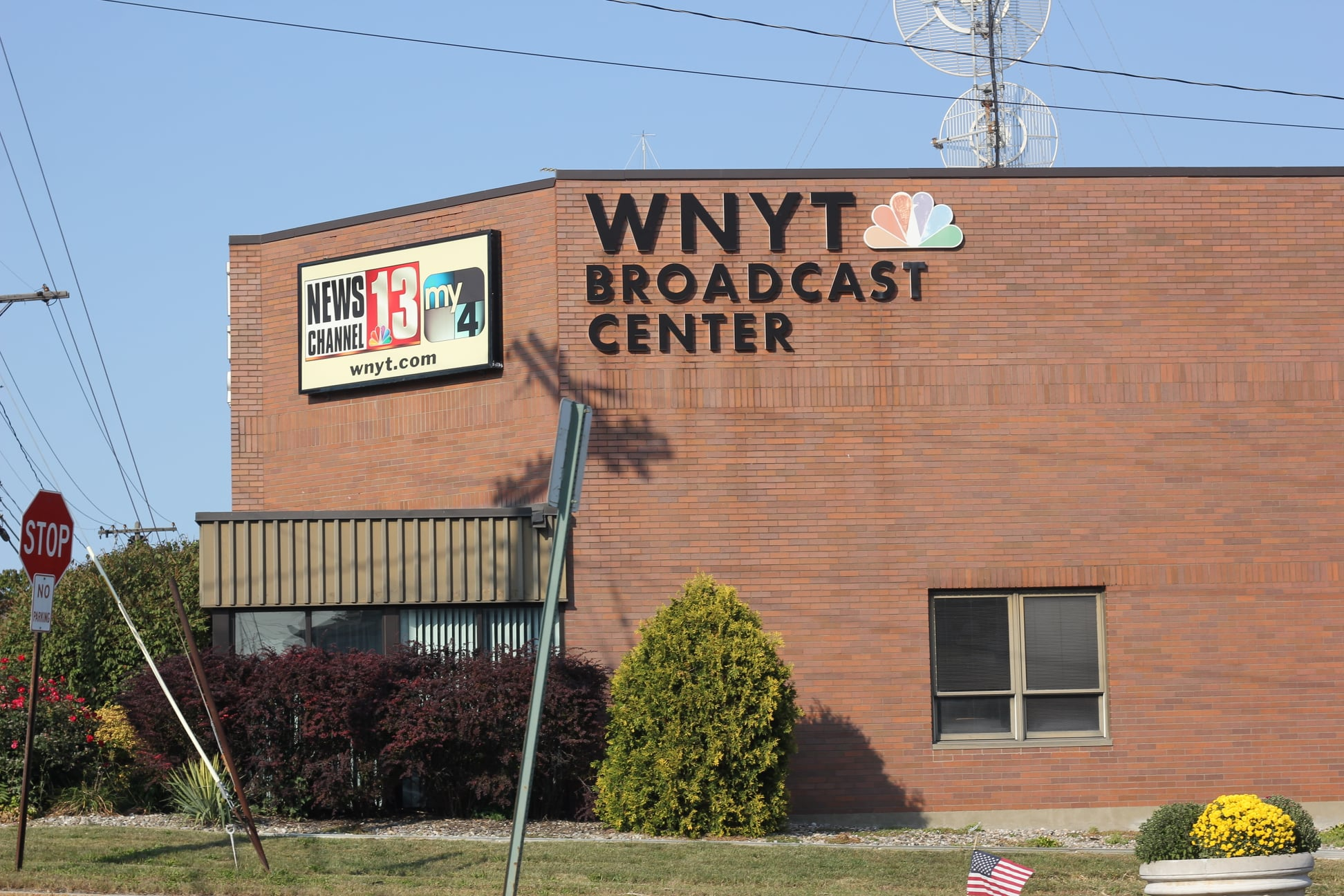
- Studios in Menands, New York
- Albany–Schenectady–Troy, New York; United States
- City: Albany, New York
- Channels: Digital: 21 (UHF); Virtual: 13
- Branding: NewsChannel 13

Programming
- Affiliations: 13.1: NBC; for others, see § Subchannels

Ownership
- Owner: Hubbard Broadcasting; (WNYT-TV, LLC)
- Sister stations: WNYA

History
- First air date: February 28, 1954
- Former call signs: WTRI (1954–1958); WAST (1959–1981)
- Former channel numbers: Analog: 35 (UHF, 1954–1958), 13 (VHF, 1959–2009); Digital: 12 (VHF, 2003–2024)
- Former affiliations: CBS (secondary 1954–1955, primary 1977–1981); Dark (1955–1956); ABC (1956–1977)
- Call sign meaning: New York Television

Technical information
- Licensing authority: FCC
- Facility ID: 73363
- ERP: 970 kW
- HAAT: 414 m (1,358 ft)
- Transmitter coordinates: 42°37′31.3″N 74°0′36.7″W
- Translator(s): see § Translators

Links
- Public license information: Public file; LMS
- Website: wnyt.com

WNYT (channel 13) is a television station licensed to Albany, New York, United States, serving the Capital District as an affiliate of NBC. It is owned by Hubbard Broadcasting alongside WNYA (channel 51), an independent station with MyNetworkTV. The two stations share studios on North Pearl Street in Menands (with an Albany postal address); WNYT's primary transmitter is located on the Helderberg Escarpment west of New Salem.

This station began broadcasting on February 28, 1954, on UHF channel 35 as WTRI, originally licensed to nearby Schenectady. It was a secondary affiliate of CBS, with WRGB (channel 6) having first-call rights on network programs. The Capital District had originally been assigned just one channel in the then-superior VHF band, which belonged to the established WRGB. Two UHF stations, WTRI and WROW-TV (channel 41), struggled for viability at a time when the UHF band had poorer reception and not all televisions could tune UHF stations, and thus fought for the addition of VHF channels to the Albany area. On January 31, 1955, when WROW-TV picked up the CBS affiliation, WTRI left the air. It returned the next year as the ABC affiliate. Two years later, channels 10 and 13 were authorized to be reassigned to Albany for use by channel 41 (which became WCDA-TV and then WTEN) and channel 35. In 1959, WTRI moved to channel 13 and became WAST. The new channel 13 had short-spacing limitations to the south, to protect channel 13 in the New York City area, which limited the station's coverage area and earning potential.

For years, WAST was the third-place station in ratings in Albany television, a situation reflected by its being abandoned by networks twice within five years for stronger stations. In 1977, ABC moved to WTEN, leaving WAST to become the CBS affiliate. CBS then defected to WRGB in 1981, leaving a then-third-rated NBC network to affiliate with channel 13. Viacom, which had acquired the station between the two switches, used the 1981 switch to reset the station's image, including the new call sign WNYT. Viacom's steady investment in the station saw it rise in the local news ratings, first to second place in the mid-1980s and then to first toward the end of its ownership. The increasing use of cable television aided channel 13 by equalizing its signal difficulties.

In 1996, Viacom traded WNYT and WHEC-TV in Rochester to Hubbard in exchange for that company's WTOG in Florida. Under Hubbard, WNYT has remained competitive in the Albany market. With the digital television transition in the 2000s, WNYT moved its transmitter in with other Albany-market stations. WNYA was acquired in 2013, forming a duopoly. The station broadcasts 36 hours a week of local news programming.

== WTRI: The UHF years ==
=== Survival on two fronts ===
On April 11, 1952, the Federal Communications Commission (FCC) lifted a self-imposed freeze on television applications through the adoption of the Sixth Report and Order, addressing the necessity for additional channels with the addition of ultra high frequency (UHF) broadcasting. The three primary cities of New York's Capital District—Albany, Schenectady and Troy—received a total of five allocations: WRGB in Schenectady was ordered to move from very high frequency (VHF) channel 4 to 6 because of new mileage separations; UHF channels 17 (reserved for educational use), 23, and 41 were available to any community within the immediate Albany–Schenectady–Troy area, while channel 35 was restricted to only Schenectady to avoid possible interference with channel 42 at Greenfield, Massachusetts. (Note: Stations seven channels apart could not be spaced within 60 miles (97 km) of each other to avoid oscillator frequency interference.)

Two groups filed with the FCC for channel 35 at Schenectady: the Champlain Valley Broadcasting Corporation, in which Meredith Publishing held an interest; and the Van Curler Broadcasting Company, a subsidiary of Fabian Enterprises, a New York City-based theater chain who owned the Stanley Warner group of theaters. Van Curler and Champlain Valley had both previously applied for channel 9 prior to the FCC freeze in 1948, as had two other companies: Patroon Broadcasting, a subsidiary of the Schine Theatre chain, owners of WPTR in Albany; and Troy Broadcasting, owners of WTRY in Troy, both of whom now sought channel 23. Troy Broadcasting president Harry C. Wilder was a former owner of WSYR in Syracuse, New York; following the sale of the station to S.I. Newhouse in 1947, he remained president of WSYR and its television sister, WSYR-TV, until leaving his post in September 1952.

Champlain Valley had been operating WXKW in Albany under a construction permit since 1948 because of difficulties with its six-tower directional array, causing complaints of interference from WHDH in Boston and KOA in Denver. Looking for a way out of incurring further expenses with operating WXKW and seeking a TV construction permit, a deal was brokered between the four companies after channels 23 and 35: Champlain Valley would sell the assets of WXKW to the three other parties for $300,000, with Patroon to pay $150,000 and Van Curler and WTRY to pay $75,000 each, after which the radio station would cease operations; in return, Champlain Valley would relinquish its bid for channel 35. WTRY and Van Curler, in turn, would then file a joint bid for channel 35, thereby leaving Patroon uncontested for channel 23. This deal was approved by the FCC on June 11, 1953, and re-affirmed on July 23 when the FCC rejected a protest by WABY in Albany. WABY had alleged the parties stifled competition through a merger agreement and questioned whether the involvement of the Schine and Stanley Warner theatre interests in channels 23 and 35 would result in a "tendency to monopolize the media of mass communications". Wilder was named president of the combined WTRY–Van Curler operation. WXKW left the air on July 31, with five station staff joining WPTR.

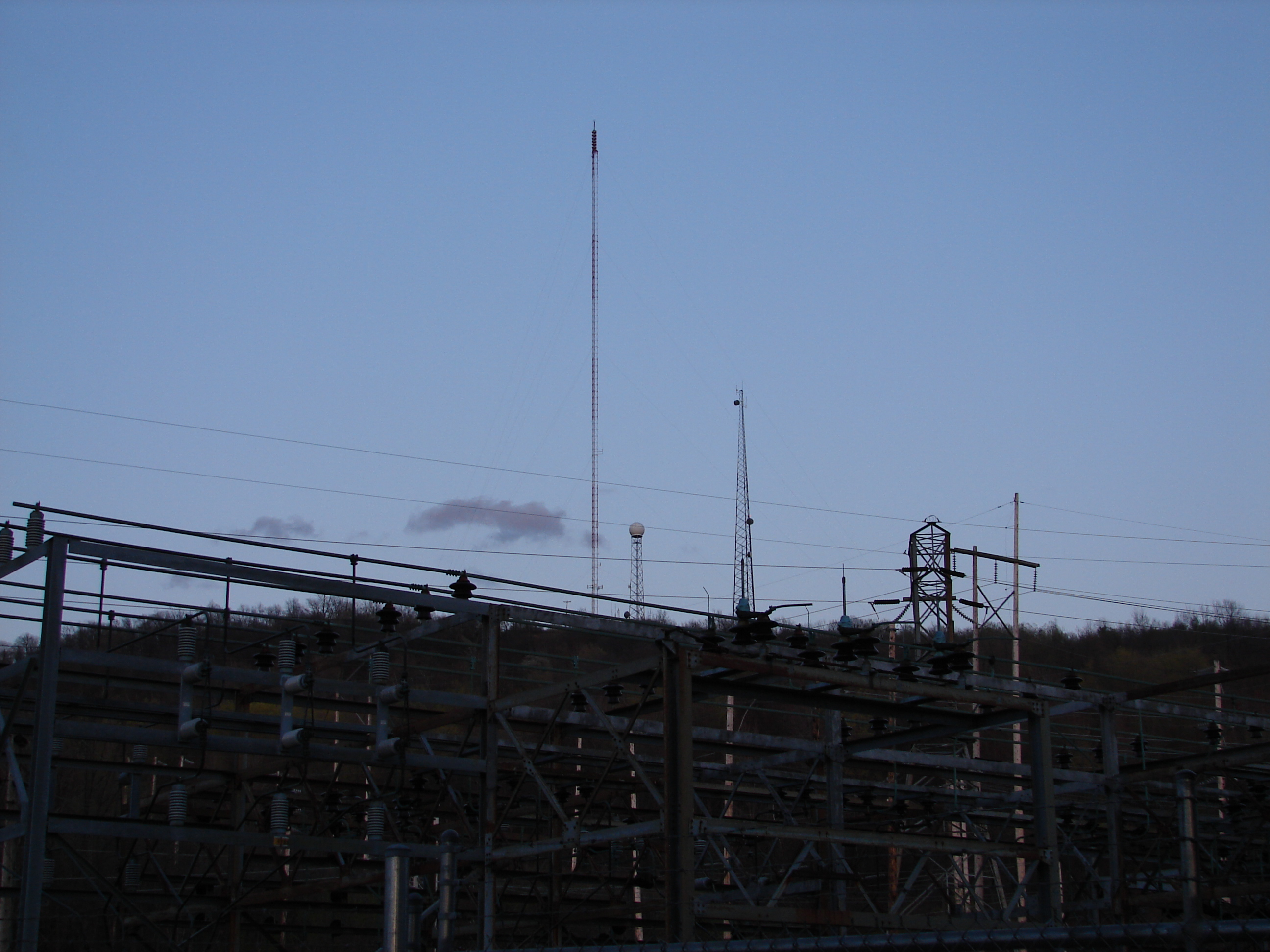
Mount Rafinesque (Bald Mountain) outside of Troy was this station's primary analog transmitter site from 1954 to 1958 and 1963 to 2009. It is today used by a digital replacement translator.

Channel 35, granted the call sign WTRI, won FCC approval that October to construct a 500-foot (150 m) transmission tower on Mount Rafinesque (Bald Mountain), two miles (3 km) northeast of Troy; permission to operate a temporary studio from the transmission site followed in January, after an earlier application to locate its studios in Menands, near Albany, was denied by the FCC; WTRI contended that operating from studios in Schenectady would cause its microwave relay to be disturbed by airplanes from Albany International Airport. WROW-TV (channel 41) in Albany opposed WTRI's Menands application, stating that as the channel 35 permit was for Schenectady, it should operate there, and that a second station in Albany would greatly affect WROW-TV's business. Undeterred, WTRI petitioned the FCC the following month to assign the channel 35 license to Albany–Schenectady–Troy, rather than Schenectady alone; the petition stated that, since the Greenfield, Massachusetts, allocation had moved from channel 42 to 58 on September 30, 1953, as a result of an error in constructing the original Television Table of Assignments, the limitation no longer applied to channel 35 in the Capital District.

While awaiting the results of the petition, WTRI began broadcasting on February 28, 1954, transmitting from a 524-foot (160 m) tower in Mount Rafinesque, operating with 262,000 watts average effective radiated power, with temporary studios there. WTRI originally operated as a secondary CBS affiliate, sharing programs with WRGB. Syndicated programs filled out other parts of WTRI's prime time schedule, including Liberace's half-hour program on Mondays and an hour-long professional wrestling program, Ringside with the Rasslers, on Wednesdays. Local programming during WTRI's first year included programs on golfing and skiing, telecasts of ice hockey matches from Rensselaer Polytechnic Institute, and Sheriff of Cactus County, with program director Fred Shavor introducing Western films as the title character. A mixed-breed dog, Teddy, who was found outside WTRI's transmitter building shortly after starting operations, began appearing in close-ups during the program and soon became a fan favorite; Teddy eventually became a regular part of the cast.

On May 12, 1954, the FCC granted WTRI's petition to reclassify it as an Albany–Schenectady–Troy station. On July 7, WTRI changed its city of license to Albany and received FCC approval to permanently house its studios in Menands; WROW-TV once again protested the move but withdrew its final protest in September. On November 1, WTRI moved into its new studios at North Pearl Street.

Despite the victory over WROW-TV, two events over the next few months would test WTRI's long-term survival. On October 14, 1954, it was reported that a consortium led by CBS commentator Lowell Thomas, a resident of Pawling, made an offer to purchase a controlling interest in the Hudson Valley Broadcasting Corporation, the parent of WROW-TV-AM. Frank J. Smith, former president of the State Tax Commission, Thomas's business manager and part of the consortium, hinted at the possibility of WROW-TV taking the CBS affiliation from WTRI should the FCC approve the deal. The offer was approved on November 3, with the Thomas group paying $298,800 for 83 percent of the company.

Immediately after the sale, WROW-TV, looking to improve service in the region, requested the addition of VHF channel 10 at Vail Mills, 20 miles (32 km) northwest of Schenectady, to the Television Table of Assignments. The station contended it was the only available area within the Capital District at least 170 miles (270 km) from any viable VHF channel. WTRI made a counter-proposal on November 17, asking the FCC to shift all commercial television in the Capital District to the UHF band by shifting the educational reservation to channel 6 and forcing WRGB to move to a UHF channel.

On December 3, WTRI filed a petition with the FCC to stay the approval of the sale of the WROW stations to the Thomas group and to call for a hearing on the matter. WTRI, who had been informed by CBS that its affiliation agreement had been withdrawn, described Thomas as a member of the CBS organization and charged that a "secret understanding" existed between Hudson Valley and CBS under which WTRI would soon lose its secondary CBS affiliation to WROW-TV; furthermore, WTRI general manager Richard B. Wheeler charged that WROW-TV salesmen damaged WTRI's business by telling WTRI's advertisers and local advertising agencies that WTRI's loss of CBS affiliation and WROW-TV's move to channel 10 would be inevitable. WTRI also called for an antitrust investigation, alleging that CBS would have "effective control" of the WROW stations. While the plea asking immediate relief was rejected by the FCC on December 22, two other phases of the petition—whether contractual or business relationships between Thomas and CBS violated FCC ownership rules, and whether existing understandings concerning network affiliations violated the Sherman or Clayton antitrust acts—were scheduled for oral arguments; originally scheduled for January 24, 1955, the hearings were postponed several times and were eventually scheduled for May 9, 1955.

The hearings did not bar WROW-TV from signing an affiliation agreement with CBS on December 30, 1954, assuming WTRI's secondary affiliation with CBS effective February 1; channel 41 retained its affiliation agreements with ABC and the DuMont Television Network. With no available network affiliations, WTRI announced it would sign off on January 31, 1955. 40 employees were laid off; Wilder helped them find work at other television stations, including WPRO-TV in Providence, Rhode Island. Teddy, the canine co-star of Sheriff of Cactus County, received many adoption offers after the station went dark; he eventually settled with a family on Lawn Avenue in Albany several blocks from the studio.

=== Dark times and deintermixture ===
The FCC hearings on Thomas's purchase of the WROW stations began on May 9, 1955. During the first day of testimony, Wilder testified that WTRI had never received any formal notification that CBS was terminating its affiliation with channel 35 and that CBS never gave any hint of dissatisfaction with WTRI. A memorandum between CBS president Frank Stanton and chairman of the board William S. Paley discussed several possible reasons for affiliation with WROW-TV, including the possibility of WROW-TV moving to channel 10 in Vail Mills; Wilder denied the memorandum's claim that WTRI was not interested in channel 10, reviewing earlier efforts to have channel 10 assigned to the Capital District and their abandonment of the efforts upon discovering it was unfeasible. Wheeler testified that WTRI had lost $457,000 during their operation of channel 35; he also claimed that CBS had previously assured the station the affiliation would remain on WTRI and that the first notice he had of the CBS affiliation switch to WROW-TV was when he had seen a newspaper photograph of two members of Hudson Valley's board of directors, U.S. representatives Leo W. O'Brien and Dean P. Taylor, signing an affiliation agreement.

Stanton testified on May 12, denying a charge the CBS affiliation went to WROW-TV because Taylor was on the board; Stanton admitted to meeting Taylor the previous July, but claimed Taylor had sought Stanton's guidance on running a station, and not help in obtaining the affiliation. Stanton further stated that CBS had disaffiliated from WTRI because of dissatisfaction with the station, and because he had confidence in the Thomas group's plans for the improvement of WROW-TV.

Thomas testified on May 13, stating he had acquired an interest in the WROW stations only as an investment and a springboard for some ideas in radio and television he wished to try out; up to that point, the only idea Thomas advanced was to encourage their audience to read newspapers, which he felt presented more depth to stories in comparison to the "highlights" broadcast over radio and television. Thomas assured the FCC his role in the management of the WROW stations would be minimal. He contended his only relationship with CBS was his contract as a radio newscaster and that he owned no stock in CBS, which Thomas called "one of the major mistakes in my life".

As the arguments were being considered, the fight for the addition of channel 10 at Vail Mills continued. Speaking at an FCC hearing on June 28, WTRI's counsel, former FCC commissioner Paul A. Porter, claimed that the addition of channel 10 would "decapitate" television service in the area, supported deintermixing the Capital District by making it all-UHF, and stated that WTRI would return to the air if the FCC rejected the channel. Paul Hennessey, counsel for WRGB, strictly rejected the notion of moving to UHF, while James McKenna, counsel for WMGT in Pittsfield, Massachusetts, proposed substituting UHF channels for ungranted VHF allocations in intermixed areas where conversion to UHF had reached sufficient levels. Several weeks later, on July 13, Troy Broadcasting separated WTRY from its television sister, selling the radio station to the former owners of WHIM in Providence, Rhode Island, for $500,000.

On October 31, FCC examiner James D. Cunningham recommended the dismissal of WTRI's protest against the sale of the WROW stations to Thomas, finding nothing improper in the transaction and stating that Thomas was employed as talent under contract to CBS. Less than two weeks later, on November 10, the FCC added channel 10 to Vail Mills by a 4–3 vote. WTRI and WMGT appealed the addition of channel 10; during a hearing at the U.S. Court of Appeals on December 8, WMGT claimed that UHF set conversion orders in the Pittsfield area dropped off upon the announcement of the drop-in. The next day, the Court of Appeals granted the stay on adding channel 10; a petition by Hudson Valley to vacate the stay was denied on February 14, 1956.

The Senate Committee on Interstate and Foreign Commerce held a probe on February 8, 1956, in which deintermixture took up most of the session. Mike Monroney assailed television set manufacturers, saying they had "no sense of public service at all" for not making sets capable of receiving both VHF and UHF channels; FCC commissioner George McConnaughey stated that, of the 37 1/2 million television sets in the country, only 7 million were capable of receiving UHF channels. Committee chairman Warren Magnuson noted the increase in the manufacture of VHF-only sets despite the negligible added cost—$8 to $13—of making an all-channel set.

=== A return to air and the FCC's big decision ===
On March 10, 1956, industry sources reported that WTRI would return to the air on August 1 as the Capital District's ABC affiliate; although no specific reason was given, speculation arose that WTRI wanted to strengthen its position in the event the FCC added an additional VHF channel in the market in addition to channel 10. The FCC was in the process of examining several possibilities for the future of Capital District television. ABC suggested a plan which would have had VHF channel 8 moved in from New Haven, Connecticut, where WNHC-TV was presently operating; subsequently, the Hartford–New Haven market would have been made all-UHF. Stanley Warner confirmed the return of WTRI to the airwaves with the announcement of their purchase of Troy Broadcasting's stake in Van Curler for $75,000 plus the assumption of $350,000 in debts on March 27, 1956; the deal was approved by the FCC on April 26.

WTRI returned to the air in two phases. A limited daily schedule of news and movies from 4:30 p.m. to 7:30 p.m. began on June 15, 1956, to re-orient station personnel. A full day's schedule with ABC programs debuted on July 1, signing on at 1:30 p.m. and signing off at 11:30 p.m. Sheriff of Cactus County returned to the air and remained until September 27, 1957; Shavor returned the following Monday with a new character, "Major Quinn", introducing action-adventure films. Shavor ended the show in September 1959 to fully devote himself to program direction. WTRI began airing programs and movies from the NTA Film Network on April 1, 1957.

On June 26, 1956, the FCC, in a 4–3 vote, reached a proposal which would have deleted channel 10 from Vail Mills and added channel 47 at Albany–Schenectady–Troy. Three of the concurring commissioners proposed a further step: the deletion of channel 6, forcing WRGB onto a UHF channel and making the Capital District all-UHF. The plan was strongly opposed by WRGB, who claimed in a survey conducted in late 1956 that over 120,000 people could receive only channel 6 despite efforts to convert for UHF reception, people who would be fully deprived of service should channel 6 be deleted.

On February 26, 1957—as part of a process that, by that time, had spread to around 30 communities—the FCC voted 5–2 to make the Capital District all-UHF: channel 10 was to be deleted at Vail Mills, channel 6 would be moved to Syracuse, and UHF channel 47 would be added in its place. In their decision, the FCC was of the view that a third VHF station at Syracuse outweighed a VHF station in the Capital District; furthermore, the FCC were not entirely convinced of WRGB's claim of deprived service, as the survey also acknowledged widespread mechanical difficulties with TV sets when the survey was conducted. The FCC also pointed to the heavy UHF conversion rate in the area—about 80 percent—and suggested that the generally flat terrain of the area was suitable for UHF operation, while outlying areas could be reached with translators (Note: WROW-TV, by that time renamed WCDA, had signed on two such translators: WCDB (channel 29) at Hagaman, New York, on April 3, 1956, and WCDC (channel 19)—the former WMGT—at Adams, Massachusetts, on February 22, 1957.) and more powerful transmitters. The decision received widespread opposition from viewers in the area who could only receive WRGB; WRGB and WCDA (the former WROW-TV) vowed to fight the ruling, with General Electric (GE), WRGB's owner, claiming the FCC's order deprived GE and TV set owners of their rights and properties without due process, and would devalue their broadcasting assets in Schenectady.

Four months later, on June 21, 1957, the FCC shifted its position. The commission proposed a reversal of their February order which would not only retain channel 6 and assign channel 10 at Vail Mills to WCDA but also move the channel 13 allocation at Utica to Albany, for use by WTRI. Utica's WKTV, in turn, would shift from channel 13 to channel 2. The proposal received the unanimous support of all four stations. ABC said it would oppose the proposal if the FCC did not consider improvements in other markets, particularly Syracuse, Providence, and Rochester, New York. (Note: Channel 6 was added to New Bedford, Massachusetts, 28 miles (45 km) southeast of Providence, in October 1956; ABC supported a rulemaking to relocate the channel to Providence that was ultimately terminated in July 1961. Channel 13 at Rochester and channel 9 at Syracuse were eventually added in August 1961, requiring channel shifts in those markets.)

The Mohawk-Hudson Council on Educational Television, producer of educational programming on the three Albany-area stations, announced in July it would apply for one of the vacated channels should the VHF proposal go through and negotiate with WCDA and WTRI for donations of UHF equipment. Mohawk-Hudson chose not to seek channel 17, (Note: The New York State Department of Education held a construction permit for WTVZ on channel 17 since July 1952.) the designated non-commercial allocation in the Capital District, so as to avoid modifying the donated transmitter or the home viewer's set. Van Curler agreed to donate their transmitter, tower, antenna and facilities totaling $500,000 to Mohawk-Hudson contingent on the FCC's VHF decision.

The proposal was granted on September 5, granting WCDA and WTRI special temporary authority to operate on channels 10 and 13, thereby leaving the stations open to new applications in the interim. In September, WTRI chose new transmission facilities atop Spruce Mountain, north of Saratoga Springs, to adhere to the 170-mile (270 km) requirement.

While WCDA's changeover was almost immediate, signing on channel 10 on December 1 from new transmission facilities in Broadalbin under the new call sign of WTEN, WTRI's changeover would last more than a year due to WKTV's struggles to find a new site for its tower. The WKTV tower, originally planned to be sited in Fairfield, was blocked due to air safety concerns from authorities at Griffiss Air Force Base in Rome; several other possible sites were met with objections from WSYR-TV in Syracuse and WCBS-TV in New York City due to violations of station mileage separations. The following September, the Air Force withdrew their objection to the Fairfield location, clearing the way for WTRI to build its Spruce Mountain transmitter.

WTRI's broadcast day expanded in October 1958; the station now signed on at 9:24 a.m. on weekday mornings to accommodate ABC's introduction of daytime programming. Later that month, WTRI aired a telecourse, sponsored by the Mohawk-Hudson Council, instructing viewers in the Russian language.

== WAST ==
=== Move to VHF and Sonderling ownership ===
Program tests on channel 13 began on November 1, 1958, while WKTV was off the air, and on January 1, 1959, the station began broadcasting from Spruce Mountain on channel 13 with a new call sign, WAST, reflecting the Albany–Schenectady–Troy area. The December 15, 1958, issue of Broadcasting erroneously announced the new call sign as "WTAS", causing manager William A. Riple to feign horror and say that viewers would mistake the station for the Soviet news agency TASS. WAST's programming continued to be simulcast on channel 35 for the convenience of viewers.

Channel 35 was shut down on April 12 but unexpectedly returned to the air on August 15, at a time when WAST was reported to be considering its use as a satellite much as WTEN had. WAST was considering using the channel to fill in gaps in reception, one of which was down Pearl Street from the Menands studio. The news disappointed Mohawk-Hudson, which had desired to use the channel. In 1963, the FCC allowed WAST and WTEN to move their VHF transmitters toward Albany to provide more equitable signal coverage, though the move required the stations to mitigate interference and investigate providing service by translator to Herkimer, New York, and Rutland, Vermont. WAST remained short-spaced at the new site by 28 miles (45 km) to WNDT/WNET in the New York City area. The move of channel 13 to Bald Mountain allowed channel 35 to be taken out of service on July 27, 1963.

During this era, channel 13 had a large local program schedule. In September 1959, the station launched a new daytime schedule heavy on hosted programs—including three hosted movies a day—and began starting up earlier in the morning. Walter Hawver of the Knickerbocker News noted the lineup's "dearth of news shows". In 1960, the station debuted the local bowling program Capital Bowling. WAST replaced WTEN as the area's outlet for the franchised children's program Romper Room in 1966.

The Glen Alden Corporation acquired Stanley Warner in 1967 but had no interest in retaining WAST, which was put on the market. Friendly Broadcasting, owner of Albany radio station WOKO, considered acquiring the TV station, which had been profitable for several years. In February 1968, RKO General agreed to acquire WAST from the Glen Alden Corporation. The deal never proceeded, as the parties fretted that concerns around RKO General—which at the time owned four VHF TV stations in the U.S. and a fifth in Canada—might send the case to a lengthy hearing. Instead, the Sonderling Broadcasting Corporation of Oak Park, Illinois, acquired WAST on January 1, 1969, for $8 million. Sonderling was in the middle of expansion, having acquired two distributors of TV commercials and WLKY in Louisville, Kentucky, earlier that year.

We used to talk about the anchor du jour at WAST.

— Don Decker, former WTEN news director

Though WAST logged some firsts of its own in the area of news under Sonderling—including the first local attempt at an hour-long early evening newscast, first use of the brand Eyewitness News in the Albany market, and first local station to use electronic news gathering—channel 13 remained the third-place news station in the market, noted for frequent changes in news personnel. For years until 1976, the station did not offer any weekend newscasts. However, as ABC rose to become the number-one network in the mid-1970s, its local newscasts attracted increased audience share.

=== Two affiliation switches and a sale in five years ===
In 1977, ABC had just reached a renewal of its affiliation agreement with WAST. However, the network surprised station officials, who thought their affiliation renewal was assured and had reportedly been told by ABC that there was no chance of a switch, by moving its Albany-market affiliation to WTEN. WTEN's owner, Poole Broadcasting, also owned ABC affiliates in Flint, Michigan, and Providence, Rhode Island, the latter a recent defection from CBS. The competitive situation for ABC was stronger than CBS nationally and locally, where the presence of two strong CBS affiliates in outlying areas—WCAX-TV in Burlington, Vermont, and WBNG-TV in Binghamton, New York—was not matched by ABC. The switch was snarled by an attempt from CBS to hold WTEN to a six-month cancellation clause which would have prevented it from changing networks until January 31, 1979. After failing to convince WRGB—owned by General Electric—to defect from NBC, CBS signed WAST as its new affiliate, and the switch took place on October 23. WAST made several changes to its news lineup, shifting its only weekend newscasts from Sunday to Saturday and cutting back the local game show Pitfall, hosted by David Allan. The switch did little to boost the station's news fortunes. At 6 and 11 p.m., WAST news had audience shares of 15 and 17 percent, while WTEN had 39 and 30 percent and WRGB led with a 41 and 46 percent share.

In 1978, Sonderling Broadcasting agreed to sell nearly all of its holdings, including WAST, to Viacom International for $28.75 million. During its tenure as a CBS affiliate, the station preempted the CBS late night lineup in 1978 and was known to drop occasional prime time programs for sports coverage. Its local newscasts continued to be characterized by substantial turnover in news anchors and low ratings.

WAST found itself on the outgoing end of its affiliation again in 1981, when CBS signed WRGB to an affiliation agreement. The switch, which Variety declared of "enormous symbolic portent" due to WRGB's lengthy history as NBC's first TV affiliate, was a significant upgrade for CBS to a station that was leading its market in spite of NBC's poor ratings of the time. CBS president James Rosenfield had previously noted that the restrictions on channel 13's signal to the south were costing the network more than $2 million a year. Despite having built up its equipment and improved its antenna, WAST's signal was still lesser than its competitors. Viacom was not as committed to taking the open NBC affiliation and openly stated it was considering converting WAST to an independent station, but it signed an affiliation agreement with NBC, setting the switch for September 28. Switching to NBC brought channel 13 an affiliation that, in its long association with WRGB, had dominated the Albany-area ratings.

== WNYT ==
=== From third place to second ===
Viacom used the affiliation switch to reboot channel 13's struggling image. Believing that a call sign change would help call viewers' attention to the improvements the company had made, it filed for the call sign WNYT—"New York Television". Changes in the news department also accompanied the switch. Chris Kapostasy, who had only recently started with channel 13 as a reporter, became WNYT's new weekend anchor that November. An experiment with a local newsmagazine, 7:30 Live, lasted eight weeks. Meanwhile, WNYT carved out an identity as a station offering "news for busy people" with its 30-minute early and late evening reports.

By 1984, Viacom had made some $3 million in capital investments to WNYT. This included a modernization of the Pearl Street studios. That November, WTEN ran an advertisement showing a horse labeled "10" passing a horse labeled "6", with a voiceover proclaiming, "We're winning the race in local news." There was no "13" horse to be seen. In hindsight, the advertisement was seen as arrogant and a catalyst to spur on WNYT. In that month's ratings survey, WNYT posted its first-ever second-place finish in total-day ratings, surpassing WTEN, at a time when NBC was gaining ratings strength nationally. In the long run, WNYT also benefited from the increasing penetration of cable television systems which equalized the signal issues that had hampered channel 13 in the southern portion of the Albany market.

After a stint as a specialist reporter and presenter of money stories on the weeknight newscasts, Kapostasy was promoted to weeknight co-anchor, alongside Ed Dague, in 1987. Dague had joined WNYT in 1984. In the years that followed, WNYT added morning and noon newscasts (in 1988 and 1989 respectively) and relaunched as NewsChannel 13 in September 1991. A 5 p.m. newscast debuted in 1994, followed by a 5:30 p.m. half-hour in January 1996, giving WNYT a 90-minute early-evening local news block.

Beginning in January 1996, WNYT produced Albany's first local 10 p.m. newscast in association with WMHQ (channel 45), then a public TV station operated by WMHT. The half-hour format combined 15 minutes of local news from WNYT with a 15-minute local interview program hosted by Michael Carrese of WMHT. Within a year, WXXA had started a 10 p.m. newscast. Live at 10 continued to air until July 1998.

=== Hubbard Broadcasting ownership ===
Viacom's 1994 acquisition of Paramount Pictures placed the company's existing television stations (WNYT; WHEC-TV in Rochester; WVIT in New Britain, Connecticut; KMOV in St. Louis; and KSLA-TV in Shreveport, Louisiana) under common ownership with Paramount's broadcasting arm, the Paramount Stations Group; the two groups were formally consolidated in December 1995. With its focus shifting to the new United Paramount Network (UPN), Viacom began to eye a sale of its major network affiliates. In November 1994, it accepted a bid from Smith Broadcasting Group and Jupiter Partners for all of the stations except Shreveport. The Smith-Jupiter bid proposed a minority investor, which under FCC rules of the time would have enabled Viacom to receive a federal tax certificate. However, after federal scrutiny of another tax certificate deal involving Viacom led to proposals to abolish the system altogether, Viacom reconsidered and canceled the deal.

In August 1996, Viacom/Paramount agreed to trade WNYT and WHEC-TV to Hubbard Broadcasting in return for UPN affiliate WTOG in St. Petersburg, Florida. Hubbard retained WNYT's unionized setup, even though most of the company was non-union. In a first, WNYT beat WRGB in the 6 p.m. news ratings in May 1997; though channel 13 had long dominated among advertiser-sought demographics, WRGB had continued to hold the lead in total households. Rob Owen of the Times Union credited WNYT's anchor stability, popular NBC entertainment programming, and constant promotion for the shift. The early Hubbard years brought a high-profile change: the 1998 departure of Kapostasy for NBC News, whose president Andy Lack had watched her while vacationing in Lake George. (Note: At NBC News, she went by her married name, Chris Jansing.) Her first replacement was Kari Lake, an anchor who had been working in Phoenix, Arizona. Lake departed WNYT after a year to return to Phoenix.

By 2000, WNYT had been dominant for years in late news and had taken the lead over WRGB at 6 p.m., but WRGB led in most other time slots. During this time, the Capital Region news rankings were volatile, with fluctuations in a number of time slots. In the years that followed, WNYT took and retained the lead at 6 p.m. and then passed WRGB in the morning. However, WRGB posted gains at 11 p.m. by 2006 owing to a much stronger CBS prime time lineup and weakness at NBC.

In 2001, Hubbard entered into a joint sales agreement with Paxson Communications Corporation to provide sales and marketing support to the local Pax station, WYPX-TV (channel 55). This included WYPX airing rebroadcasts of WNYT newscasts. The Pax network canceled all of its joint sales agreements with stations nationwide in 2005.

Hubbard fired 20 news staffers in December 2008, at the height of the Great Recession, among them co-anchor Lydia Kulbida. The decision was attributed as the cause for a steep decline in news ratings in the year that followed. By November 2009, WNYT was out of first in all evening newscasts, with WRGB claiming three of the four leading newscasts.

Of the major broadcasters in Albany, Hubbard was the last not to have either an outright duopoly or a shared services partner. On February 25, 2013, Hubbard announced that it would purchase WNYA from Venture Technologies to form a duopoly with WNYT, for $2.3 million, pending FCC approval. Hubbard sought a failed station waiver to acquire the station; Venture had put WNYA up for sale in 2009, but no other potential buyers came forward. The sale did not include the low-power Class A station WNYA-CA, which remained with Venture Technologies. On May 29, 2013, the FCC approved the sale of WNYA to Hubbard. After the sale, WNYT began producing a 10 p.m. half-hour newscast for WNYA featuring a section of Berkshires–area news contributed by The Berkshire Eagle newspaper; WNYT had previously maintained a bureau in the area in the 2000s.

By 2024, WNYT was in a close race with WTEN for news viewers, leading in the morning and at 11 p.m. but second behind WTEN in the early evenings. As of March 2026, the station produced 36 hours a week of local news programming plus 8 1/2 hours a week for WNYA, consisting of a 7 a.m. weekday newscast and nightly half-hour 9 p.m. newscast. The morning news extension debuted in 2025.

== Notable former on-air staff ==
- Adrianne Baughns – anchor, early 1970s
- Andrew Catalon – weekend sports anchor and sports reporter, 2003–2013
- Alan S. Chartock – political commentator, 1993–1999
- Nancy Cozean – anchor, 1980–1985
- Betty George – weather presenter and host of Betty and Moo, 1973–1983
- Todd Gross – chief meteorologist, 1981–1983
- Chris Kapostasy – weekend anchor and reporter, 1981–1987; weeknight anchor, 1987–1998
- Kari Lake – anchor, 1998–1999
- Miles O'Brien – weekend anchor and reporter, 1983–1985
- Randy Salerno – reporter and weekend anchor, 1988–1993
- Norm Sebastian – meteorologist, 1985–2000
- Don Weeks – weatherman, 1965–1968 (known on-air as "Wally Weather")

== Technical information ==
=== Subchannels ===
WNYT broadcasts from a transmitter facility west of Albany on the Helderberg Escarpment. The station's signal is multiplexed:

Subchannels of WNYT
Subchannel	Res.	Short name	Programming
13.1	1080i	WNYT-HD	NBC
13.2	480i	MeTV	MeTV
13.3	480i	startTV	Start TV
13.4	480i	getTV	Great (4:3)

WNYT signed on its digital signal in October 2003 on VHF channel 12. Unlike the station's analog signal, WNYT's digital transmitter was located near Helderberg, utilizing a common tower shared by most of the area's broadcasters. The station shut down analog broadcasting on June 12, 2009, the national digital television transition date for full-power TV stations, and continued to broadcast on its pre-transition VHF channel 12, using virtual channel 13. In June 2024, WNYT's primary transmitter moved from VHF channel 12 to UHF channel 21, following a petition made by Hubbard in 2021 and approved by the FCC in 2022.

=== Translators ===
WNYT operates five repeaters, three separately licensed translators and two digital replacement translators attached to the WNYT license.

- Gloversville, New York: W18FE-D
- Pittsfield, Massachusetts: W28DA-D
- Adams, Massachusetts: W32FW-D
- Glens Falls, New York: WNYT DRT (channel 28)
- Troy, New York: WNYT DRT (channel 27)

In 1971, WAST opened a translator in Kingston. By this time, it also had translators in Gloversville, New York; Pittsfield, Massachusetts; and Rutland, Vermont. The Adams transmitter, on Mount Greylock, was approved in the 1980s and brought WNYT's signal to areas that previously could only receive one station. Two of the original translators closed in the 1990s. The Kingston translator closed in 1991 because it served too few people to justify the expense; WNYT lost its place on most cable systems in the area when WTZA (channel 62) began broadcasting in 1985, an event that had forced a channel change for the translator. The Rutland translator was closed in 1994 as a result of a state environmental board ruling invalidating approval of its tower, ordering it to be dismantled.
