= WRGB =

Television station in Schenectady, New York

- Schenectady–Albany–Troy, New York; United States
- City: Schenectady, New York
- Channels: Digital: 35 (UHF); Virtual: 6
- Branding: CBS 6

Programming
- Affiliations: 6.1: CBS; 6.2: Roar; 6.3: Comet

Ownership
- Owner: Sinclair Broadcast Group; (WRGB Licensee, LLC)
- Sister stations: WCWN

History
- Founded: January 13, 1928 (as experimental station W2XB)
- First air date: February 26, 1942
- Former channel numbers: Analog: 3 (VHF, 1938–1946), 4 (VHF, 1946–1954), 6 (VHF, 1954–2009); Digital: 39 (UHF, 2003–2009), 6 (VHF, 2009–2022)
- Former affiliations: NBC (1942–1981); CBS (secondary, 1942–1954); DuMont (secondary, 1942–1954); ABC (secondary, 1948–1953)
- Call sign meaning: Walter Ransom Gail Baker (GE engineer and head of NTSC); coincidental to the RGB color model of analog color television

Technical information
- Licensing authority: FCC
- Facility ID: 73942
- ERP: 1,000 kW
- HAAT: 392 m (1,286 ft)
- Transmitter coordinates: 42°37′31.3″N 74°0′36.7″W
- Translator(s): 5 (VHF) Schenectady (located in Hancock, MA); 29 (UHF) Schenectady (located in Ulster; NYC market); 15 (UHF) Glens Falls

Links
- Public license information: Public file; LMS
- Website: cbs6albany.com

WRGB (channel 6) is a television station licensed to Schenectady, New York, United States, serving the Capital District as an affiliate of CBS. It is owned by Sinclair Broadcast Group alongside CW affiliate WCWN (channel 45). The two stations share studios on Balltown Road in Niskayuna, New York; WRGB's transmitter is located on the Helderberg Escarpment west of New Salem.

WRGB is notable for being one of the first television stations in the world. It began broadcasting experimentally in early 1928, with the first daily programs being broadcast later that year. It later became one of a handful of television stations licensed for commercial broadcasting operation before the end of World War II, being the fourth overall to sign on and by far the smallest TV station during World War II.

The station launched the on-camera careers of TV chefs Art "Mr. Food" Ginsburg in the mid-1970s; and of Rachael Ray, who launched her "30 Minute Meals" segment on WRGB's newscasts in the mid-1990s.

== History ==
=== W2XCW ===
One of the first experimental television stations in the world, WRGB traces its roots to an experimental station founded on January 13, 1928, and broadcast from the General Electric facility in Schenectady under the call letters W2XCW. It was popularly known as "WGY Television" after its sister radio station (though WMAK, the predecessor of modern station WBEN in Buffalo also had partial control of the station, which was relinquished shortly after the station signed on). W2XCW operated a very limited schedule, with 30 kW on 2.1–2.2 MHz (video) and 92 meters (approx. 3.258 MHz) (audio). It transmitted 24 vertical lines of resolution at a rate of 20 frames per second. As of July that year, it broadcast from 1:30 to 2pm Tuesdays, Thursdays and Fridays, and 10:15 to 10:30pm Sundays.

=== W2XAF ===
The W2XCW callsign disappeared around 1932. By 1930, GE had begun audio transmission on shortwave; one of these transmitters, W2XAF, was pressed into service during off-hours for further television experiments, which continued through the 1930s. Toward the end of that decade, General Electric teamed up with other experimental broadcasters to adopt an all-electronic TV standard that was created by RCA.

=== W2XB ===
In 1938, General Electric announced plans to build and operate a standalone TV station, and applied for an FCC license. It was granted the callsign W2XB, which took to the air in 1939. It moved into the VHF band using a 6 MHz-wide channel and improved resolution (gradually increasing from 343 to 441 to 525 lines). In 1940, it began sharing programs with W2XBS (forerunner of WNBC) in New York City, receiving the New York station directly off the air from a mountaintop and rebroadcasting the signal, becoming NBC's first television affiliate. Later, the New York connection was achieved via coaxial cable and eventually by satellite. The NBC affiliation would last for 42 years.

=== WRGB ===
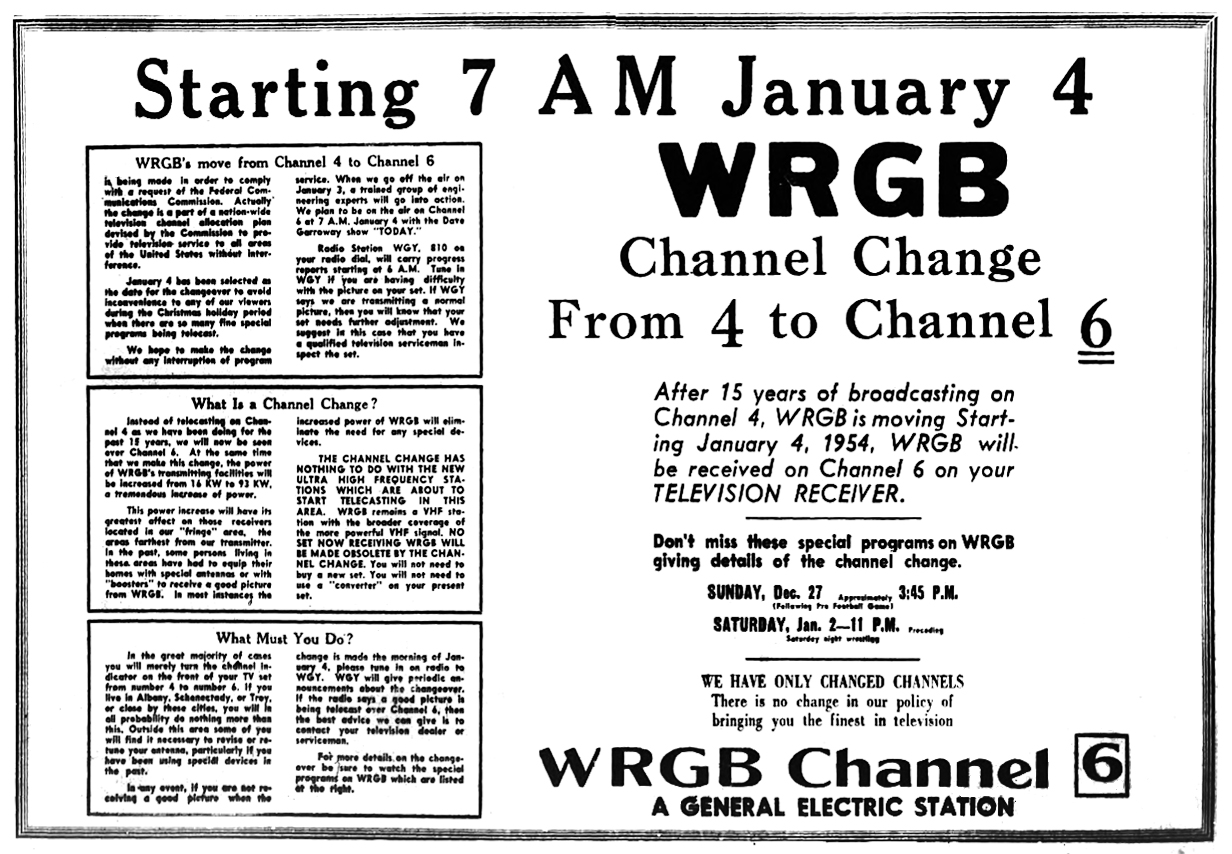
WRGB's late 1953 promo alerting viewers that the station would relocate to Channel 6 beginning on January 4, 1954

In 1942, W2XB opted to end experimental broadcasts and begin commercial programming. While the call sign WGY-TV was available, the company applied for and received the call sign WRGB, in honor of pioneering electric engineer Walter Ransom Gail Baker. WRGB signed on for the first time as a commercial station on February 26, 1942; becoming the second outside of New York City (after WPTZ in Philadelphia, now KYW-TV) and the fourth overall in the United States. The station moved into a state-of-the-art studio on Washington Avenue in Schenectady. It was the first building in the nation specifically designed for television.

In 1948, WRGB took on secondary affiliations with the three other networks in operation (CBS, ABC, and DuMont). At the time of the announcement, the station only broadcast for 28 hours a week. On January 4, 1954, it moved from channel 4 to channel 6 to alleviate interference from WNBC-TV (then known as WRCA-TV) and Boston's WBZ-TV, and increased its radiated power approximately fourfold to 93,000 watts. WRGB dropped its secondary affiliations when WCDA (channel 41, now WTEN on channel 10) and WTRI (channel 35, now WNYT on channel 13) took the ABC and CBS affiliations respectively. From 1939 till 1957, the station's studio were located on Washington Avenue in downtown Schenectady. In 1957, WRGB moved to its current studio on Balltown Road on the line between Niskayuna and Schenectady; the old studio is currently occupied by Schenectady County Community College.

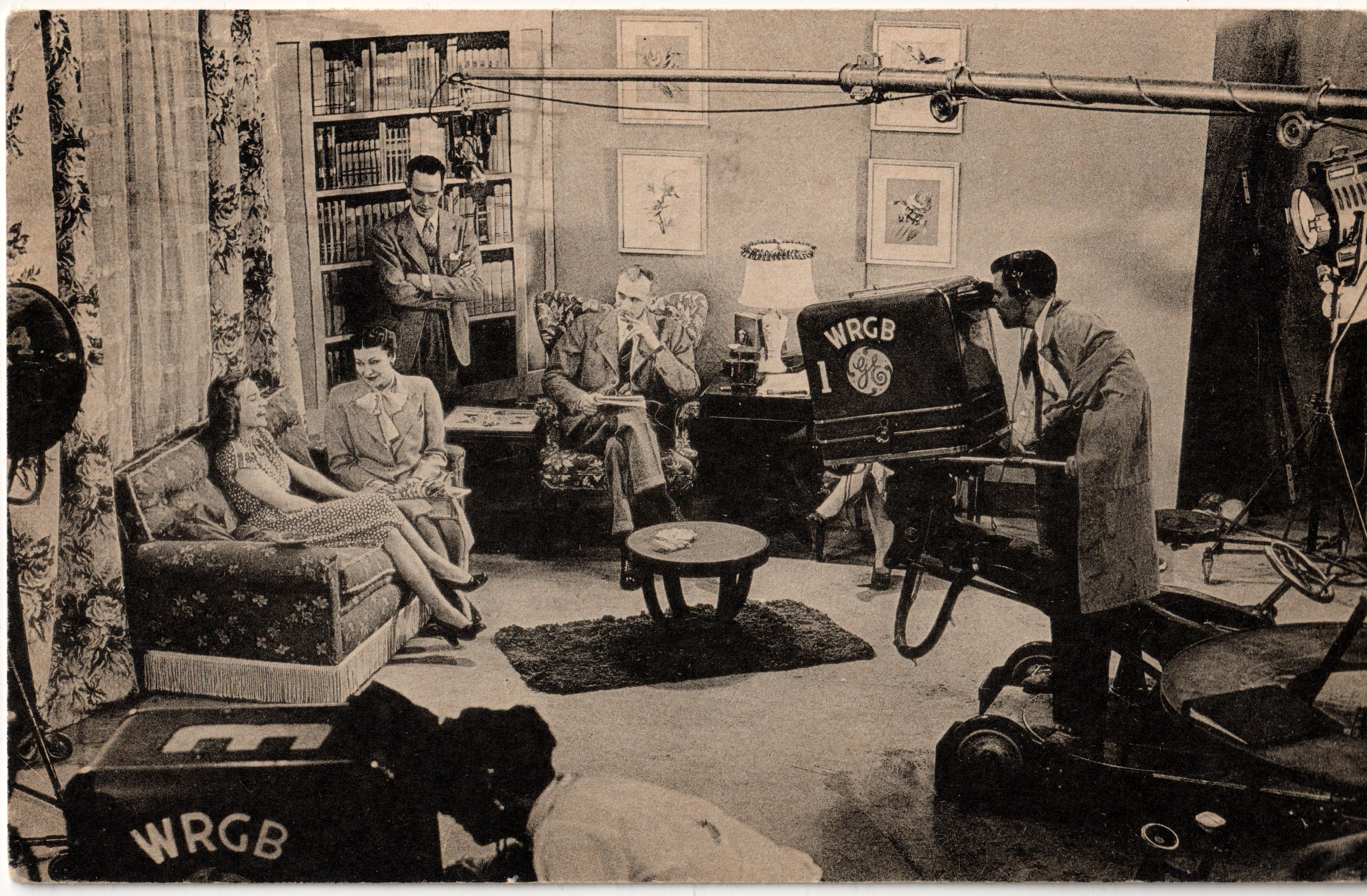
An interior view of the General Electric Television Station WRGB in Schenectady, NY, 1949

The longest-running locally produced children's television show, Freihofer's Breadtime Stories was broadcast on the station starting November 21, 1949. WRGB produced two of the longest-running locally produced programs in television history: a quiz show called Answers Please and a bowling program entitled TV Tournament Time. After the cancellation of both by the late-1980s, WRGB's local programming has been variable and erratic, ranging from a local home shopping show to a weekly video countdown done with Top 40 stations WFLY and (later) WKKF.

1952 ad for Garry Stevens' music program, showing a WRGB camera

In 1979, General Electric almost filed to sell WRGB to Group Six Broadcasting during a proposed General Electric merger with Cox Broadcasting, with Group Six being led by the station's general manager and vice president James J. Delmonico, which paid $24 million, but the deal apparently fell through due to a lack of FCC approval.

On September 28, 1981, WRGB swapped affiliations with WAST (which would become what is now WNYT on the day of the switch) and became a CBS affiliate. WAST had only picked up the CBS affiliation four years earlier, but had remained stubbornly in third place behind WRGB and WTEN. Under the circumstances, when its affiliation contract with WAST ran out, CBS jumped at the chance to align with long-dominant WRGB. The switch made WRGB the third station in the Capital District to affiliate with CBS, with the newly rechristened WNYT taking over the NBC affiliation. The network had originally aired on WTRI, forerunner of WNYT, from 1954 to 1955, then moved to WCDA (now WTEN) from 1955 to 1977.

In August 1983, 41 years of General Electric ownership ended when it sold WRGB to Universal Communications Corporation which was owned by Forstmann Little and John D. Backe, a former CBS president and then president of Tomorrow Entertainment (GE would re-enter the TV business upon its purchase of RCA, then-parent company of NBC in late 1985, which WRGB was formerly affiliated with). WRGB was sold to Freedom Communications in March 1986. In 1987, WRGB won the Broadcast Pioneers Golden Mike Award and shortly thereafter was awarded a Presidential Citation by Ronald Reagan.

In September 2003, WRGB-DT (UHF channel 39) became the first full-market digital signal to sign on in the Albany region. Around December 2007, WRGB and WCWN became the first television stations in the Capital District that upgraded to high definition time delay and rebroadcast capability, and high definition local broadcasts. This allows broadcasting of syndicated shows in high definition. WRGB changed its on-air name to "CBS 6" in October 2004.

Providence Equity Partners owned a controlling stake in Newport Television (formerly Clear Channel Communications' television division), the owner of local Fox affiliate WXXA (channel 23). As a result, the FCC granted conditional approval of Newport's acquisition of Clear Channel Television in late November 2007, provided that Providence Equity Partners would follow through with its planned divestiture of its 16 percent share of Freedom Communications to another company (as required when Providence Equity Partners purchased a minority stake in the Spanish-language broadcaster Univision earlier in 2007) as soon as the deal was finalized. Freedom filed for Chapter 11 bankruptcy in September 2009, emerging in April 2010. At that point, Providence Equity Partners relinquished its stake in Freedom Communications, making its purchase of WXXA legitimate.

Freedom announced on November 2, 2011, that it would bow out of television and sell its stations, including WRGB, to Sinclair Broadcast Group. The group deal closed on April 2, 2012, after which Sinclair obtained a waiver allowing the company to keep both WRGB and WCWN. In 2016, WRGB adopted a logo similar to that of sister station WSYX in Columbus, Ohio, replacing the ABC logo with that of the CBS eye.

=== FM audio ===
WRGB's former analog TV signal used an FM audio carrier which could be heard on 87.75 FM in areas where the video signal could be received (and somewhere it could not); the same was true of all analog channel 6 television stations in North America. Many channel 6 stations would then promote this avenue for commuters to listen to their morning and early evening newscasts, or severe weather and breaking news coverage on their car stereos, including WRGB.

However, this analog FM carrier no longer existed for digital television stations after the June 12, 2009, conversion to digital, but remained in effect for analog low-powered stations on channel 6 until they too transitioned on July 13, 2021, where now only a few stations are broadcasting an FM audio carrier signal on 87.75 alongside an ATSC 3.0 carrier signal.

When WRGB shifted its digital broadcasts to channel 6 with the full-power digital transition, Freedom proposed an unconventional approach to retain the analog audio broadcast, requesting to operate an analog FM radio transmitter at the far right edge of its allocated spectrum, using vertical polarization to retain compatibility with standard broadcast car stereos. This idea was once proposed by New York City's WNYZ-LP in 2008. According to WRGB's site, "We hope that the FCC will allow us to continue to operate on 87.7. We are building a unique transmitter for 87.7 that can operate simultaneously with our DTV signal on channel 6. TV transmissions always use horizontal antennas. Our new 87.7 transmitter will be vertically polarized. The use of vertical polarization for 87.7 will allow reception of our audio in a car radio or any other FM radio with a whip type antenna."

WRGB would be the only full-power station to propose such a solution, with only WITI in Milwaukee attempting to continue to carry its Channel 6 television audio in some form by contracting with Clear Channel to lease an HD Radio subchannel of radio station WMIL-FM until the mid-2010s. WPVI-TV in Philadelphia, the nearest full-power channel 6, expressed an interest in the technology, but backed off due to overall rights issues for its programming and continuing issues regarding reception of their station throughout the market (which would have been complicated more by side-channel analog audio).

The station received an experimental special temporary authorization from the FCC to allow it to test the FM audio system but it had to cease operations when it was found to cause RF interference with the digital TV signal.

On July 7, 2009, WRGB resumed its radio simulcast broadcasts on a frequency of 87.9 FM, without explicit FCC authorization. Less than two months later, on August 24, the FCC ordered WRGB to turn off the 87.9 transmitter. All efforts to carry an analog FM audio signal were abandoned with the sale of WRGB to Sinclair (a company that is a major stakeholder in the ATSC 3.0 standard), and its 2022 shift to UHF transmission made any renewal of the effort impossible as it no longer has access to the VHF channel 6 spectrum.

=== Power boost and proposed translators ===
As noted above, on June 12, 2009, WRGB became a digital-only station. The station vacated its digital transition UHF channel 39 and moved its digital operations to their former analog channel assignment on VHF-low channel 6. After the digital transition, some viewers in the Capital District had receptions issues with the WRGB signal. So WRGB boosted their power twice: Once in July 2009 at the power level of 11.5 kW with an interference agreement with WPVI-TV in Philadelphia and WEDY in New Haven, Connecticut, and in late January 2010, the FCC granted an STA for WRGB to boost their power again at their current level of 30.2 kW. An application was filed in June 2009 to operate at the current level on a permanent basis. That application was granted on March 16, 2011.

WRGB has also filed applications for three digital replacement translators to fill in some of the coverage-loss areas, which have all been granted construction permits. One will be in Schenectady on the station's pre-transition digital allotment on UHF channel 39, another one will be in Kingston on UHF channel 24, and the last one will be in Pittsfield on UHF channel 19. The Kingston translator became operational in May 2011.

Upon the purchase of WCWN, Sinclair added a simulcast of WRGB's main signal in a reduced 720p form on WCWN-DT3, allowing viewers with no access to the main WRGB VHF signal in the core of the Capital Region to use WCWN's UHF signal for reception of WRGB programming.

=== WNYA and WCWN involvement ===
In April 2003, WRGB signed a joint sales agreement with the area's fledgling UPN affiliate WNYA several months prior to that station's sign-on in September. Under the agreement, WRGB handled advertising sales for WNYA and shared syndicated programming with the station. The agreement, originally set to expire at the end of August 2006, was extended to the end of 2008, but was terminated in February 2007. Since September 5, 2006, WNYA has been the area's MyNetworkTV affiliate.

On June 19, 2006, Freedom Communications announced the purchase of current CW affiliate WCWN from Tribune Broadcasting for $17 million. Since the Capital District does not have enough full-powered stations to legally permit duopolies, Freedom applied for a "failed station" waiver to acquire WCWN. The waiver was granted on November 22, and the purchase was finalized on December 6, giving the Capital Region market its first duopoly. Until the end of the JSA with WNYA, WRGB had control of three stations in the market. (In 2013, WNYA would also be acquired through a "failing station" waiver when Hubbard Broadcasting, owner of rival NBC affiliate WNYT, bought WNYA.)

During past airings of the annual Jerry Lewis MDA Telethon, WNYA took on the responsibility of airing WRGB's local and network lineup. This role was later shifted to WCWN, which also aired CBS' coverage of the US Open Tennis Championship. This was no longer necessary starting with Jerry Lewis' retirement as telethon host and MDA chairman in 2011, as the telethon was significantly shortened to six hours on the night before Labor Day that year. Starting in 2013, WTEN broadcast the telethon, shortened again to two hours and retitled the MDA Show of Strength, as it moved to ABC from syndication for the event's remaining two years, ending after the 2014 edition.

== News operation ==
For most of its first half-century on the air, WRGB was the dominant news station in the Capital District. This was in part because of its status as the area's first station. Indeed, for its first decade-and-a-half on the air as a commercial station, it was the only station that provided a clear picture to most of the market; its competitors were initially on the UHF band before the FCC dropped in additional VHF allocations in the late 1950s. It also benefited from its relationship with WGY radio, which was a sister station from 1942 to 1983; the two stations were able to cover the Capital District like no one else could.

Its newscasts were anchored for over 40 years by the venerable Ernie Tetrault (who was immortalized in the 1992 film Sneakers directed by one-time WRGB intern Phil Alden Robinson).

Liz Bishop was the station's longest tenured personality. She joined WRGB as a weekend sportscaster in 1975, and became Tetrault's last anchor desk partner in 1982. She was the station's main female anchor until her retirement on May 30, 2025. After Tetrault's retirement in 1993, the station was quickly eclipsed by WNYT and for several years in the mid-1990s fell to third place, mirroring a nationwide trend that saw CBS' ratings drop in the wake of losing rights to the National Football League while NBC was buoyed by blockbuster shows like Seinfeld and ER, along with NBA, NFL and Olympics coverage. For the most part, the station has stabilized at a steady second place although for a period in the early-2000s it fell back to third. In recent years, the Capital District has seen a spirited three-way battle for news leadership, with WRGB, WTEN, and WNYT regularly trading the number-one spot.

From April 2003 until mid-2004, WNYA aired replays of WRGB's weekday noon show at 1, weeknight 11 o'clock news at 11:35, and WRGB's former public affairs program Sunday Morning with Liz Bishop. On April 17, 2006, it was announced that WNYA would begin airing an hour long extension of WRGB's weekday morning newscast at 7 known (at the time) as CBS 6 First News on UPN Capital Region. This could be seen as a pre-emptive move by WRGB to fend off a challenge by WXXA who had announced their plans to launch weekday morning news two weeks earlier. At the start of 2007, the news on WNYA moved to WCWN (because that station had higher ratings overall) becoming CBS 6 First News on The Capital Region's CW.

In 2007 and 2008, WCWN aired WRGB's 11 p.m. news during CBS' coverage of NCAA March Madness. On January 13, 2008, WRGB began producing its newscasts in high definition, becoming the first in the market to do so. This was exactly 80 years to the date after its first experimental broadcasts. The WCWN broadcast was upgraded the next day. After becoming a sister station, it was rumored that WCWN would add a WRGB-produced 10 p.m. broadcast to challenge WXXA's long time dominance at that hour. This became a reality on September 24 when WRGB launched a weeknight 10-minute block in high definition featuring the top stories of the day along with an updated weather forecast. Accordingly, it was known as The CBS 6 News 10 at 10. On October 18, 2010, this was expanded to thirty minutes and renamed The CW 15 News at 10.

In addition to its main studios, WRGB operates an Albany bureau at One Commerce Plaza in downtown Albany.

=== Weather coverage ===
As with its heritage of being the first station in the Capital Region, WRGB has also had several firsts in the weather field, given the unpredictable weather of the Northeast. In February 1996, it became the first Capital District station to put forecasts on the World Wide Web with the launch of a website. A severe weather outbreak in late May 1998 led to further developments in the station's weather coverage. WRGB won an Emmy Award for Chief Meteorologist Steve Lapointe's near-nonstop work over two days which made sure there were no fatalities in the otherwise devastating weather.

In May 1999, the station started "WeatherNet 6" which allows viewers to submit weather observations around the area. The public is allowed to report anything from current conditions to snowfall totals. In 2000, the station became the first in the market to offer a station-owned weather radar known as "Instant Doppler 6" that was installed next to their studios. This exclusive distinction was held until 2004 when WNYT set up its own live radar. In recent times, WTEN and WXXA have also updated their radar outputs to so-called "live" capabilities. They do not own their own radars but decided to re-brand the live NOAA National Weather Service NEXRAD Level II radar data as their own. Data is used from four regional sites in Albany, Binghamton, Montague, and Upton. This government data is also used on WRGB known as "WeatherScan Radar".

WRGB was the last in the market to bring a degree-holding meteorologist onto its staff with the purchase of the station by Freedom, not doing so until several years after WTEN and WNYT did. On January 6, 2009, veteran meteorologist Neal Estano returned to the area airwaves for his third tour of duty with WRGB. He had worked for the station twice before leaving to pursue new opportunities in Jacksonville, Florida and Baltimore, Maryland. Estano left the station on April 25, 2012, taking on a new career in real estate with Keller Williams Realty. Estano has since reappeared on Capital Region airwaves, starting at WNYT in the summer of 2013 on weekend evenings.

=== Notable former on-air staff ===
- Dr. Alan Chartock
- Tony Guida
- Dr. Tim Johnson
- Joe Pagliarulo – main anchor
- Howard Reig – announcer for WGY radio and WRGB from 1943 to 1952
- Joe Tessitore – sports anchor

== Technical information ==
=== Subchannels ===
The station's signal is multiplexed:

Subchannels of WRGB
Subchannel	Res.	Short name	Programming
6.1	1080i	WRGB-HD	CBS
6.2	480i	ROAR	Roar
6.3	480i	Comet	Comet
45.2	480i	Charge!	Charge! (WCWN)
45.4	480i	TheNest	The Nest (WCWN)

Broadcast on behalf of another station

=== Analog-to-digital conversion ===
WRGB shut down its analog signal, over VHF channel 6, on June 12, 2009, the official date on which full-power television stations in the United States transitioned from analog to digital broadcasts under federal mandate. The station's digital signal relocated from its pre-transition UHF channel 39 to VHF channel 6. During the 2019 digital television repack, WRGB continued to broadcast on VHF channel 6, though due to long-time complications with low-band VHF channels, the station was simulcast in a 720p form on WCWN-DT3 to provide UHF antenna access to over-the-air viewers. In early 2022, WRGB itself relocated to UHF channel 35, and the WCWN simulcast was converted to one in ATSC 3.0, as the station serves as the market's lighthouse station, carrying all the major stations except for WNYT in the format.
