= WVBG-LD =

Television station in Greenwich, New York

- Greenwich–Albany–Schenectady–Troy, New York; United States
- City: Greenwich, New York
- Channels: Digital: 17 (UHF); Virtual: 25

Programming
- Affiliations: see § Subchannels

Ownership
- Owner: Bridge Media Networks; (Bridge News LLC)

History
- First air date: 1968 (in Gilboa, Prattsville, and Roxbury); August 27, 1998 (in Albany)
- Former call signs: W04AS (1968–October 1997); W25CF (October–December 1997); WVBG-LP (1998–2021)
- Former channel numbers: Analog: 4 (VHF, 1968–1998), 25 (UHF, 1998–2008), 41 (UHF, 2008–2009); Digital: 41 (UHF, 2009–2021)
- Former affiliations: NET (as translator, 1968–1970); PBS (as translator, 1970–1997); Dark (1997−August 1998 and 2003−2011); Independent (August–October 1998, 2000−2001, and 2011–2021); UPN (October 1998–2000); RSN (2001–2003); Buzzr (2021–2024); NewsNet (2024); ShopHQ (2024–2025)
- Call sign meaning: Vision 3 Broadcasting Group (former owner)

Technical information
- Licensing authority: FCC
- Facility ID: 74018
- Class: LD
- ERP: 15 kW
- HAAT: 159.4 m (523 ft)
- Transmitter coordinates: 42°32′26.9″N 73°58′23.3″W

Links
- Public license information: LMS

WVBG-LD (channel 25) is a low-power television station in Greenwich, New York, United States, serving the Capital District as an affiliate of Binge TV. Owned by Bridge Media Networks, the station maintains a transmitter in Clarksville, New York.

== History ==
What is now WVBG-LD has its origins in a translator station on channel 4 serving Gilboa, Prattsville, and Roxbury, operated by the Board of Cooperative Educational Services of the Third Supervisory District of Delaware, Greene, and Schoharie counties and carrying programming from WMHT in Schenectady, WCNY-TV in Syracuse, and WNDT in New York City. The station, which was granted its construction permit in 1966, went on the air two years later as W04AS. On February 8, 1991, the Otsego-Northern Catskills BOCES transferred the station to the WSKG Public Telecommunications Council; by this point, W04AS was a translator for WSKG-TV in Binghamton.

On May 17, 1996, WSKG filed an application to move W04AS to channel 25 in Albany, Schenectady, and Troy, New York, with a transmitter located on the Helderberg Escarpment. That July, Vision 3 Broadcasting announced that it would purchase W04AS and operate the station as the flagship of a group of three low-power television stations in the Capital District, along with W83AL (channel 83) in Andes (which would have also been acquired from WSKG and be converted into W21BU channel 21 in Hudson, Catskill, and Chatham) and W02CJ (channel 2) in Manchester, Vermont (which was acquired from Ronald and Jan Morlino, two of Vision 3's principals, and converted to W39CE channel 39 in Glens Falls, Saratoga Springs, Easton, and Hudson Falls). The channel 21 signal was dropped from the network by 1997 after it was determined that its coverage area could be served with the channel 25 signal; by then, the group (which, despite each station operating on different channels, was branded simply "TV 25") also included W49BU (channel 49) in Manchester, Vermont. The move to channel 25 was granted a construction permit on October 2, 1997, and issued the call sign W25CF; on November 5, Vision 3's parent company Sharp Vision completed its purchase of the station from WSKG. The call letters were changed to WVBG-LP on December 12, 1997.

Because of the delay in receiving the construction permit, channel 25 was the last of the three stations to go on the air; W39CE (later renamed WVBX-LP; now WEPT-CD channel 15 in Newburgh) signed on in December 1997, and W49BU (later renamed WVBK-LP; now WHNH-CD channel 2) went on in March 1998, with WVBG itself debuting on August 27, 1998. Initially an independent station, WVBG and its satellites became a UPN affiliate on October 5, 1998; it already carried the UPN Kids block, but the network's primetime programming had previously been seen in the Capital District through secondary affiliations with Fox affiliate WXXA-TV (channel 23) and Pax station WYPX (channel 55), as well as cable carriage of WSBK-TV from Boston. However, from its inception, the station could not get carriage on Time Warner Cable, which chose to continue its carriage of WSBK; this was despite acquiring several sports packages, including Big East football and basketball, the Boston Red Sox (the telecasts of which were dropped following a territorial complaint by the New York Yankees), and the Boston Celtics.

WVBG-LP changed its city of license to Greenwich, New York, on April 22, 1999 (Greenwich had earlier been added as a fourth city of license after Albany, Schenectady, and Troy); this helped Vision 3 win must-carry rights in Washington County on December 3, 1999. However, the UPN affiliation ended at the start of 2000 when cable-only "WEDG-TV" (known later as "UPN 4") signed on as a joint operation between Time Warner Cable and WXXA. WVBG would then revert to being an independent station, heavily emphasizing its status as a primarily over-the-air station; that June, Vision 3 put WVBG and WVBX up for sale, and by 2001 much of the station's schedule was taken up by Resort Sports Network programming.

On June 28, 2001, WVBG-LP was sold to Wireless Access, a group of telephone companies in the region, as part of plans to introduce wireless Internet service. However, the plan was never implemented, and by early 2003 channel 25 had gone off the air; it returned a year later airing color bars. On September 2, 2005, WVBG was granted a construction permit to move to channel 41. The station lost its transmitter site lease on November 30, 2006, forcing the station off-the-air until getting special temporary authority to operate from a new location in Clarksville (the proposed site for the channel 41 operation) a year later. Broadcasting on channel 25 ended on August 10, 2008; on September 3, the station filed for a license to cover construction of the channel 41 facility. On September 15, 2009, WVBG was granted a construction permit to flash cut to digital operation; this facility will change the station's city of license back to Albany and return the transmitter to the Helderberg Escarpment. WVBG lost access to its tower in Clarksville on April 8, 2010, due to an ownership dispute involving the tower, forcing the station to suspend broadcasting; it returned to the air on April 6, 2011, from another nearby tower under special temporary authority.

== Subchannels ==
The station's signal is multiplexed:

Subchannels of WVBG-LD
Subchannel	Res.	Short name	Programming
25.1	480i	WVBG-LD	Binge TV
25.2	480i	Bridge1	Infomercials
25.3	480i	Bridge2	Infomercials
25.4	480i	WBPI	WBPI-CD (Religious)
25.5	480i	AceTV	All Women's Sports Network
25.6	480i	OAN	One America Plus
25.7	480i	YTA	YTA TV
25.8	480i	Sales	Infomercials
25.9	480i	BarkTV	Bark TV
25.10	480i	RNTV	Z Living
25.11	480i	FTF	FTF Sports
25.12	480i	MTRSPR1	MtrSpt1
25.13	480i	AWE	AWE Plus
25.14	480i	NBTV	National Black TV
25.15	480i	ZLiving	Oz TV
25.16	480i	Sales2	beIN Sports Xtra
25.17	480i	GDTV	Infomercials

Subchannel broadcast with MPEG-4 video
