= WTEN =

Television station in Albany, New York

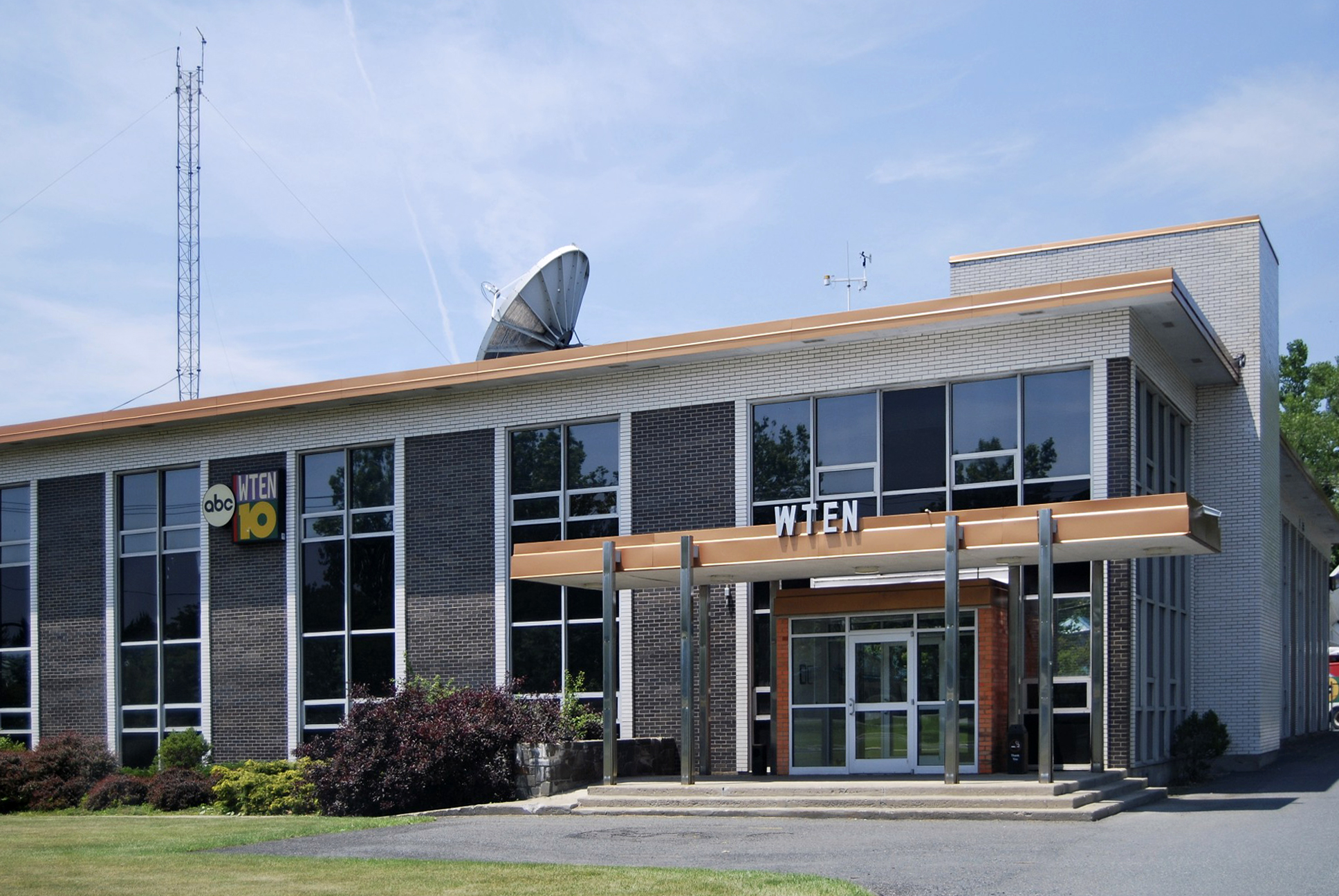
- WTEN studio and office facility, on Northern Boulevard in Albany, circa 2010.
- Albany–Schenectady–Troy, New York; United States
- City: Albany, New York
- Channels: Digital: 24 (UHF); Virtual: 10
- Branding: WTEN ABC; News 10

Programming
- Affiliations: 10.1: ABC; for others, see § Subchannels

Ownership
- Owner: Nexstar Media Group; (Nexstar Media Inc.)
- Sister stations: WXXA-TV

History
- First air date: October 14, 1953
- Former call signs: WROW-TV (1953–1956); WCDA (1956–1957)
- Former channel numbers: Analog: 41 (UHF, 1953–1957), 10 (VHF, 1957–2009); Digital: 26 (UHF, 2004–2019); Translators: W04AE Herkimer, NY; W04AL Bennington, VT; W07AN Schoharie, NY
- Former affiliations: ABC (1953–1955); DuMont (secondary, 1954–1956); CBS (1955–1977)
- Call sign meaning: Channel Ten

Technical information
- Licensing authority: FCC
- Facility ID: 74422
- ERP: 1,000 kW
- HAAT: 427.2 m (1,402 ft)
- Transmitter coordinates: 42°37′31.3″N 74°0′36.7″W

Links
- Public license information: Public file; LMS
- Website: www.news10.com

WTEN (channel 10) is a television station licensed to Albany, New York, United States, serving the Capital District as an affiliate of ABC. It is owned by Nexstar Media Group and operated alongside Fox affiliate WXXA-TV (channel 23). The two stations share studios on Northern Boulevard in Albany's Bishop's Gate section; WTEN's transmitter is located on the Helderberg Escarpment west of New Salem.

WTEN formerly operated full-time satellite WCDC-TV (channel 19) in Adams, Massachusetts, with transmitter located on Mount Greylock, the highest peak in Massachusetts. WCDC-TV's signal covered portions of western Massachusetts and southern Vermont that received a marginal to non-existent over-the-air signal from WTEN, although there was significant overlap between the two stations' contours otherwise. WCDC-TV was a straight simulcast of WTEN; the only acknowledgement of the station's existence came during Federal Communications Commission (FCC)-mandated hourly legal identifications. Aside from its transmitter, WCDC-TV did not maintain a physical presence in Adams. Nexstar planned to shut down WCDC-TV on December 1, 2017, via the FCC's spectrum incentive auction, but damage to the station's transmission line forced it to end operations two weeks early on November 19.

== History ==
WTEN began broadcasting on October 14, 1953, as WROW-TV on UHF channel 41. It was owned by the Hudson Valley Broadcasting Company, operating alongside WROW radio (590 AM). The two stations shared space inside a former retirement home for nuns on a farm dirt road in the town of North Greenbush, near Troy. It broadcast from a temporary transmitter in Herkimer, limiting the signal to the immediate area. The station went to full power and installed a permanent tower next to the studio a few months later. It was originally the Capital District's ABC affiliate.

Within their first year, the station was losing money, and on the verge of bankruptcy. By November 1954, Hudson Valley's shareholders sold controlling interest to a New York City–based syndicate group led by legendary radio broadcaster/author Lowell Thomas and his manager/business partner Frank Smith, who became president of the company upon completion of the sale. After the sale, the station switched its affiliation to CBS on February 1, 1955. In the spring of 1956, the station's call letters were changed to WCDA (for "Capital District Albany") and a satellite station, WCDB (channel 29) in nearby Hagaman, New York was launched to reach areas in the northern portion of the market where the main signal did not penetrate. In December 1957, Hudson Valley merged with Durham Broadcasting Enterprises, the owners of WTVD in Durham, North Carolina, to form Capital Cities Television Corporation (predecessor of Capital Cities Communications) with WCDA as its flagship station.

That same year, the call letters were changed again to WTEN when the station moved to VHF channel 10. By this time, the market had expanded to cover not only east-central New York, but also large swaths of southwestern Vermont and western Massachusetts. Not only is this market one of the largest east of the Mississippi River, but much of it is very mountainous. UHF stations have never covered large areas or rugged terrain very well. When the FCC allocated two additional VHF channels to Albany, Hudson Valley sought and received permission to move to channel 10.

Upon moving to the VHF band, the station's transmitter was moved to Vail Mills, approximately 35 miles (56 km) west of Albany. This was necessary to protect both WHEC-TV/WVET-TV in Rochester and WJAR-TV in Providence, Rhode Island. But the new transmitter proved inadequate for serving the Capital District proper. The FCC eventually allowed a waiver in 1963 which let WTEN move its transmitter to Voorheesville, closer to Albany. The new transmitter, located on the Helderberg Escarpment, was on some of the highest ground in the region, giving WTEN a coverage area comparable to that of long-dominant WRGB (channel 6).

In 1966, WTEN and WROW moved to new facilities on Albany's northside on Northern Boulevard. Channel 10 is still based there today (the WROW radio stations moved out in 1993, ten years after they were sold by Capital Cities). In 1966, the old studio in North Greenbush was burned down by an arson fire, but the station's owner donated its old transmitter to WRPI radio.

On April 27, 1971, Capital Cities sold WTEN to Poole Broadcasting. Following its purchase of several broadcast properties from Triangle Publications, Capital Cities had to sell off two VHF stations to stay within the FCC's limit of five stations per owner at the time. In mid-1977, Poole sold WTEN and sister stations WJRT-TV in Flint, Michigan, and WPRI-TV in Providence to Knight-Ridder, with the deal finalized in 1978. Before the sale could be completed, Knight-Ridder signed an affiliation deal with ABC, which resulted in WTEN swapping affiliations with WAST (channel 13, NBC-affiliated WNYT) on October 23, 1977, thus returning ABC to its original affiliate in the Capital District (WPRI-TV had switched to ABC from CBS that June and would eventually reaffiliate with CBS in September 1995, nine years after WTEN's former owners, Capital Cities, completed its acquisition of ABC in January 1986). Upon Knight-Ridder's exit from broadcasting in 1989, WTEN and sister station WKRN-TV in Nashville were sold to Young Broadcasting. Since the Young purchases of the two stations plus WTEN satellite WCDC were made through two separate deals, they were consummated more than three months apart.

WTEN signed on its digital signal on UHF channel 26 in 2004 and began offering high definition service from the start. On October 1, 2007, Young Broadcasting launched the Retro Television Network (RTV) on a new third digital subchannel of WTEN. This was part of a test of the network with sister stations WBAY-TV in Green Bay and KRON-TV in San Francisco.

In an effort to cut costs, the company eliminated ten positions from WTEN on January 31, 2008, fueling speculation that the company might sell the station in order to pay down its financial debt. In January 2009, after failing to meet the minimum standards for listing on NASDAQ, Young Broadcasting was dropped from the exchange. One month later, on February 13, they declared Chapter 11 bankruptcy. The company planned to auction off its stations in a New York City bankruptcy court on July 14, 2009, but canceled the auction at the last minute. After multiple issues with RTV operations and programming, Young switched their main subchannel affiliations to ABC's Live Well Network as part of a group deal with Young's other stations in 2012.

On July 27, 2012, it was announced that the Capital District's Fox affiliate, WXXA-TV, owned by Newport Television, would be sold to Shield Media, LLC (owned by White Knight Broadcasting vice president Sheldon Galloway) for $19.2 million. That company then entered into a shared services agreement with Young Broadcasting resulting in WTEN operating WXXA. On October 23, the FCC granted the transaction. The move was completed on March 23, 2013. Soon afterward, WXXA closed its studios on Corporate Circle in Albany and moved its operations to WTEN.

On June 6, 2013, Young Broadcasting announced that it would merge with Media General. The merger was approved by the FCC on November 8, after Media General shareholders approved the merger a day earlier; it was completed on November 12. More than two years later, on January 27, 2016, it was announced that the Nexstar Broadcasting Group would buy Media General for $4.6 billion. WTEN and the operations of WXXA became part of "Nexstar Media Group". The acquisition resulted in Nexstar owning stations in every television market in Upstate New York; the sale was completed on January 17, 2017.

=== WCDB ===
In the spring of 1956, satellite station WCDB on UHF channel 29 in Hagaman was launched to reach areas in the northern portion of the market where WCDA's main signal didn't penetrate. This signed off in 1957 after WCDA moved its transmitter closer to Albany, making WCDB redundant even though it did provide some primary CBS coverage to Utica. The WCDB call sign would return to the air in 1978 for the student-run radio station at University at Albany. The UHF channel 29 allocation remained in the Albany market until the DTV transition in 2009; however, no other station had used the channel number since WCDB's sign-off.

=== WCDC-TV ===
WCDC-TV
Defunct; served as satellite of WTEN
- Adams–Pittsfield, Massachusetts; United States
- City: Adams, Massachusetts
- Channels: Digital: 36 (UHF); Virtual: 19

History
- First air date: February 5, 1954
- Last air date: November 19, 2017
- Former call signs: WMGT (1954–1957)
- Former channel numbers: Analog: 74 (UHF, 1954–1957), 19 (UHF, 1957–2009); Digital: 36 (UHF, 2003–2017)
- Former affiliations: DuMont (secondary, 1954–1955); ABC (1955–1957, 1977–2017); CBS (1957–1977)
- Call sign meaning: Capital District-Albany, Station C (for WTEN's original WCDA calls)

Technical information
- Facility ID: 74419
- ERP: 27.5 kW
- HAAT: 631 m (2,070 ft)
- Transmitter coordinates: 42°38′14″N 73°10′6″W

WCDC began broadcasting on February 5, 1954, as WMGT ("Mount Greylock Television") on UHF channel 74, the highest channel number ever used by a full-power U.S. television station. WMGT began as a separate station affiliated with the DuMont network. The tower location on Mount Greylock (part of a state reserve) helped WMGT serve first as the market's secondary affiliate of DuMont and later as a major boost to WCDA. In December 1954, WMGT moved to channel 19 extending the station's range to the Capital District of New York State. In February 1956, it was forced off the air when a storm damaged its transmitter tower. Capital Cities bought the license and returned it to the air in 1957 under its final sign, WCDC. (The WMGT callsign is held by an NBC-affiliated station in Macon, Georgia.) After Capital Cities returned WCDC to the air and until it shut down, it served as a straight simulcast of WCDA/WTEN. Due to snow and ice build-up, a tower collapse forced WCDC off the air again in March 1983. Most cable systems on the Vermont and Massachusetts sides of the market picked up WCDC's signal. WTEN's various owners also leased tower space to other entities, including the Massachusetts State Police and competitor WNYT for their area translator station, as well as the area's main NPR station, WAMC-FM.

WCDC's digital signal on UHF channel 36 signed on nearly eighteen months before WTEN's did in 2002. However, it did not upgrade to high definition until WTEN-DT signed on. WCDC shut down its analog signal on channel 19 on June 12, 2009, following WTEN's lead.

Citing declining over-the-air viewership, Nexstar Broadcasting, through the FCC's spectrum incentive auction in April 2017, was awarded $34,558,086 to agree to take WCDC-TV off the air; at the time, it indicated that WCDC would enter a channel sharing agreement (CSA) to continue providing service to viewers. Nexstar subsequently announced that WCDC would instead go dark December 1, 2017; however, damage to the station's transmission line in a storm would take WCDC off the air on November 19, almost two weeks earlier than scheduled. Nexstar informed the FCC that, due to insufficient time and a lack of available tower crews, the line would not be repaired before the planned shutdown date. Nexstar surrendered the WCDC-TV license for cancellation on February 12, 2018.

On December 22, 2017, WAMC entered into an agreement to purchase the Mount Greylock transmitter and tower from Nexstar for just over $1 million. Due to sitting on Massachusetts Department of Conservation and Recreation (MDCR) land and WTEN's lease having expired two years earlier, WAMC could have been taken off the air without purchasing the facility. WAMC owns the facility itself, but not the land beneath, which is under lease with the MDCR until 2025, and will fundraise in order to rebuild their financial reserves.

== News operation ==
For most of its history, WTEN was a solid runner-up to WRGB, especially after moving its transmitter to Voorheesville. WNYT overtook WTEN for the runner-up spot by the late 1980s, and in 1992, scored its first late news victory. WTEN has generally remained at a stable second place since then, although for a period in the early 2000s, it fell back to third. At times during the 1990s and 2000s, WTEN has occasionally finished ahead of WRGB or, more recently, WNYT. In terms of Nielsen ratings, the Capital District has been one of the most competitive markets in the country, with WRGB, WTEN and WNYT waging a spirited three-way battle for first place.

In November 2009, WNYT's newscasts slipped back to third place largely resulting from its owner Hubbard Broadcasting deciding to terminate many of its popular news team members. One notable personality let go from the NBC affiliate was Lydia Kulbida who was hired by WTEN in time to help launch the market's only over-the-air weekday local news show at 4 (which occurred on September 21, 2009). On October 26, 2011, WTEN became the second station in Albany to upgrade its newscasts to high definition level.

As a full-time satellite of WTEN, WCDC simulcast all newscasts from its parent outlet. Although there were no separate title openings or local cut-ins provided during the broadcasts, there was coverage of Western Massachusetts and Southwestern Vermont. Since 2001, rival WNYT has been the only Capital District-based television station to operate a bureau in Western Massachusetts (located in Pittsfield). With the consolidation of WXXA with WTEN, the ABC affiliate took over production of the Fox station's newscasts. The two stations' reporting staffs were merged immediately following the completion of Shield Media's purchase of WXXA. On January 24, 2013, the Fox outlet dropped its separate weeknight 5 and 11 o'clock newscasts. WXXA's weekday morning newscast (seen 7 to 9 a.m.) and nightly prime time broadcast at 10 were retained as this programming does not directly compete with local news airing on WTEN.

=== Notable former on-air staff ===
- Ted Knight – "Windy Knight" and host of The Early Show (1955-1957)
- Ryan Nobles – Anchor/reporter (2000s)

== Technical information ==
=== Subchannels ===
The station's signal is multiplexed:

Subchannels of WTEN
Subchannel	Res	Short name	Programming
10.1	720p	WTEN-HD	ABC
10.2	480i	Cozi	Cozi TV
10.3	480i	Antenna	Antenna TV (4:3)
10.4	480i	Court TV	Ion Mystery
45.1	1080i	CW	The CW (WCWN)

Broadcast on behalf of another station

WCDC carried WTEN's two subchannels as 19.2 and 19.3 respectively, and they were carried locally in Massachusetts on the digital tier of Time Warner Cable, and later its successor, Charter Communications.

=== Analog-to-digital conversion ===
WTEN shut down its analog signal, over VHF channel 10, on June 12, 2009, the official date on which full-power television stations in the United States transitioned from analog to digital broadcasts under federal mandate. The station's digital signal remained on its pre-transition UHF channel 26, using virtual channel 10. In 2019, during the digital television repack, WTEN moved from UHF channel 26 to UHF channel 24.

== See also ==
- List of television stations in New York
