= WYPX-TV =

Television station in Amsterdam, New York

- Amsterdam–Gloversville–; Albany–Schenectady–Troy, New York; United States
- City: Amsterdam, New York
- Channels: Digital: 19 (UHF); Virtual: 55

Programming
- Affiliations: 55.1: Ion Television; for others, see § Subchannels

Ownership
- Owner: Inyo Broadcast Holdings; (Inyo Broadcast Licenses LLC)

History
- First air date: December 14, 1987
- Former call signs: WOCD (1987-1998)
- Former channel numbers: Analog: 55 (UHF, 1987-2007); Digital: 50 (UHF, 2004–2019)
- Former affiliations: Independent (1987–1992); Cornerstone (1992–1997); inTV (1997–1998); UPN (secondary, 1998–1999)
- Call sign meaning: Y to differentiate from other Ion stations, PX for "Pax"

Technical information
- Licensing authority: FCC
- Facility ID: 13933
- ERP: 600 kW
- HAAT: 294.47 m (966 ft)
- Transmitter coordinates: 42°38′13″N 74°0′3″W

Links
- Public license information: Public file; LMS
- Website: iontelevision.com

WYPX-TV (channel 55) is a television station licensed to Amsterdam, New York, United States, serving the Capital District as an affiliate of Ion Television. Owned by Inyo Broadcast Holdings, the station has offices on Charles Boulevard in Guilderland, and its transmitter is located in the Helderberg Escarpment in New Scotland.

== History ==
The station began broadcasting in 1987 as an independent station under the call letters WOCD. It was owned by Amsterdam Broadcasting, a subsidiary of Coit Services of San Francisco, and was leased to Christian Community Television (CCT) of Schenectady, New York. CCT faced financial troubles from the outset, and they soon fell behind on their payments, so Amsterdam Broadcasting reassumed control of the station. The station went dormant in 1989, but on July 3, 1991, Coit sold the station to Tennessee TV executive Wade Griffith for $1.8 million. Griffith intended to relaunch the station as WNSI, but the deal fell through, and WOCD was sold to Pittsburgh-based religious broadcaster Cornerstone Television for $375,000 on May 8, 1992. The second incarnation of WOCD had problems getting cable carriage in much of the market, which, combined with the looming conversion to digital television, led the station to be sold again.

In 1996, Paxson Communications bought WOCD from Cornerstone, moved the station's offices from Scotia, New York, to Guilderland, and made the station an outlet for the Infomall Television Network (inTV). The call sign was changed to WYPX on January 13, 1998; however, the new calls confused some people, as there was a radio station with a similar call sign in the Albany market. WYPX became a charter station for the Pax TV network when it launched on August 31, 1998. WYPX also added a secondary affiliation with UPN on October 5, 1998, airing the network's programming in late-night hours following Pax's prime time programming. WVBG-LP (channel 25), a low-power station in Albany, also joined UPN as a primary affiliate the same day; the affiliation deal with WYPX was made before the network agreed to affiliate with WVBG (as Albany had no UPN affiliate at the time, though area cable systems imported WSBK-TV from Boston). WYPX retained its secondary UPN affiliation despite WVBG's affiliation; however, UPN programming disappeared from channel 55 in 1999.

In 2001, WYPX entered into a joint sales agreement with Hubbard Broadcasting, owner of NBC affiliate WNYT (channel 13); under this arrangement, WNYT sold advertising time on WYPX, while WYPX aired replays of WNYT's news and public affairs programming. Paxson terminated all joint sales agreements involving its stations in June 2005 as part of its relaunch of Pax TV as i: Independent Television.

== Technical information ==
=== Subchannels ===
The station's signal is multiplexed:

Subchannels of WYPX-TV
Subchannel	Res.	Short name	Programming
55.1	720p	ION	Ion Television
55.2	480i	Bounce	Bounce TV
55.3	480i	CourtTV	Court TV
55.4	480i	Laff	Laff
55.5	480i	IONPlus	Ion Plus
55.6	480i	BUSTED	Busted
55.7	480i	GameSho	Game Show Central
55.8	480i	HSN	HSN
55.9	480i	QVC	QVC

=== Analog-to-digital conversion ===
WYPX-DT signed on the air on UHF channel 50 and broadcasts at 450 kW from the same transmitter site in early 2005. WYPX-TV requested permission from the FCC to shut down its analog signal on channel 55 so that the bandwidth could be used for Qualcomm's MediaFLO service. Qualcomm had made deals with other stations on channel 55, including WLNY-TV in Riverhead, New York, to shut down analog so that they could launch their new multimedia offering on April 12, 2007. It was granted permission by the FCC to shut down its analog broadcast, surrender its analog license, and operate as a digital-only station on channel 50 on September 6, 2007. The station shut down its analog signal, over UHF channel 55, on September 28, 2007. The station's digital signal remained on its pre-transition UHF channel 50, using virtual channel 55.
