= MBC TV =

South Korean public television channel

- Country: South Korea
- Network: Munhwa Broadcasting Corporation

Programming
- Language: Korean
- Picture format: 2160p UHDTV (downscaled to 1080i and 480i for the HDTV and SDTV feeds respectively)

Ownership
- Owner: Munhwa Broadcasting Corporation
- Sister channels: MBC News Now

History
- Launched: 8 August 1969; 57 years ago
- Former names: HLAC-TV (1969–1972)

Links
- Website: imbc.com

Availability

Terrestrial
- Digital terrestrial television: Channel 11.1

Streaming media
- iMBC: Watch live (South Korea only)

MBC TV is a South Korean over-the-air TV channel owned by the Munhwa Broadcasting Corporation. The network broadcasts on LCN number 11 across the country.

== History ==
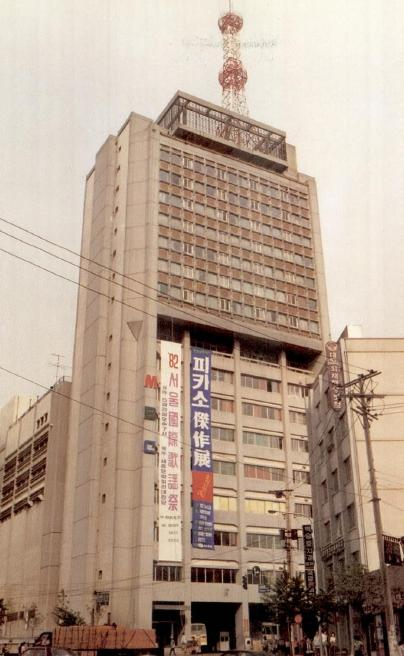
Former MBC building used between the 1970s and 1980s

The Seoul Private Broadcasting Corporation was established in 1961. In 1966, the company received a broadcasting license from the government, and in 1969 it started broadcasting on terrestrial television. Its first drama, Lovers of the Sun, came on air the following day. At the time of its launch, South Korea had 200,000 registered television sets. Unlike the Tongyang Broadcasting Company, MBC opened during the military regime of Park Chung-hee and had more restrictions, aligning its interests and programming with the government's. The channel broadcast using the HLAC-TV callsign, with output set at 2kW video and 500W aural, on VHF channel 11 in Seoul, from 6am to midnight.

On its second day on air, MBC started airing the Famous Weekend Movies slot, which ended in 2010 due to the proliferation of cable television. During its last few years this late night slot mainly aired Korean movies. The new network quickly started producing daily dramas; with three television networks available, the ratings competition intensified. In 1970, Namyang Broadcasting launched, bringing MBC to Jeju Province.

In 1970, MBC Newsdesk was launched. MBC expanded its reach nationwide that same year. A year later, the names of all regional broadcasters were merged under the MBC brand. In 1980 MBC began colour transmission from its station in Seoul, alongside KBS2, subsequently expanding colour transmission to nationwide coverage in 1981. In 1983, it started broadcasting in Cheongju City (MBC Cheongju). In 1984 it removed daily dramas from its schedule.

Together with its main rivals KBS and SBS, MBC TV began full-scale daytime broadcasting in 2005. It began broadcasting 24 hours a day in 2013, but discontinued such fulltime broadcasting in 2017. From 2014 the channel's news program was broadcast from a new television station located in Sangam, and that same year, the channel began to produce all its programs in the new studios.

== Programming ==
MBC dramas are exported to 100 countries in Asia, the Middle East, Africa and the Americas. Dae Jang Geum has high audience ratings in China, Taiwan and Hong Kong; its popularity has continued in 91 countries, including Japan. Other dramas that have enjoyed high viewership include Jumong, Coffee Prince, Moon Embracing the Sun, Yi San, Queen Seondeok, and Dong Yi.

=== Infotainment shows and documentaries ===
MBC documentaries encompass a wide range of issues, from foreign affairs to the environment. PD Notebook premiered in 1990 and has since received wide acclaim for its investigative journalism. Episodes have included one covering scientific fraud by Korean geneticist Hwang Woo-suk, and another on arguments against importing US beef. The latter episode, entitled "Is American Beef Really Safe from Mad Cow Disease?", contributed to three months of protest in Seoul against importing US beef. Since then, the accuracy of the episode and the program's method of obtaining information has been questioned.

MBC current-affairs and documentary programs have won recognition from the New York and Banff TV Festivals, the Asian TV Awards, ABU Prizes, Earth Vision and the Japan Wildlife Festival.

=== News ===
MBC News Now has 18 local news bureaus and 8 overseas news bureaus. It gas news supply agreements with CNN, APTN, NBC and Reuters TV. MBC offers a wide variety of in-depth analysis programs on politics, economy, society, and culture through Current Affairs Magazine 2580, 100 Minute Debate, Economy Magazine M, and Unification Observatory.

=== Sports ===
MBC broadcasts Los Angeles Dodgers, Pittsburgh Pirates and Texas Rangers games when Hyun-jin Ryu pitches and Shin-soo Choo and Jung-ho Kang bat.

== Controversies ==
=== 1988 — Wiretap in my ear incident ===
On 4 August 1988, MBC aired MBC Newsdesk with anchorman Kang Seong-gu. During a report on raised Seoul subway fares, a 24-year-old man named So Chang-yeong trespassed into the recording studio and attempted to steal Kang Seong-gu’s microphone, and the incident was broadcast nationwide. When So Chang-yeong demanded to speak, the screen was switched to a newsreel. Afterwards, Kang Seong-gu apologised on air. So Chang-yeong was handed over to the police.

According to the police investigation, he climbed over MBC's south back wall around 21:00 that night, took the elevator to the 4th floor, and then took the emergency stairs to the 5th-floor studio. He stated, "I had a wiretapping device in my right ear, and the vibration noise caused me a lot of pain. I could not receive treatment at the hospital, so I went to the broadcasting station to complain." The police said that in 1987 So was hit by a soccer ball and his right eardrum was ruptured. He continued to hear a buzzing noise, and appeared to suffer from delirium tremens. The young man was handed over to a national mental hospital for evaluation.

The band called Wiretap In My Ear (Prana) took its name from the incident, and it was described on Reply 1988.

=== 1988 — general strike ===
On 26 August 1988, ahead of the 1988 Summer Olympic Games, MBC TV entered a period of indefinite general strike due to possible government interference. The network's morning bulletin failed to air after 100 unionized journalists denied a non-union journalist entry. MBC produced 32% of the televised output for the Olympics.

=== 1999 — PD Note incident ===
In 1999, Munhwa Broadcasting Corporation aired PD Note, a documentary criticizing megachurch pastor Jaerock Lee. Members of the Manmin Central Church forcibly entered the TV station and cut off the power supply in the control room, interrupting the programme several times. Meanwhile, other supporters, numbering between 1,500 and 2,000, blocked off nearby roads. Manmin Central Church members later filed a lawsuit against the TV station. Three church leaders and eight members of the church were sentenced to jail for between two and a half and three years for their actions.

=== 2005 — Live Music Camp incident ===
On Saturday, 30 July 2005, the punk band Rux was invited to appear on the MBC concert program Live Music Camp on their segment "Is this song good?" The band members invited a large number of their supporters in the punk scene.

Towards the end of the performance, two punks took their clothes off and leapt around on stage in front of the live audience and cameras. Several seconds of full-frontal nudity were broadcast across the nation. The two streakers were mistakenly identified as members of the band Couch, although one was from Spiky Brats. Both were booked by the police without detention on charges of indecency and interference with a business. The police administered drug tests, but the results were negative. Rux's lead singer Won was also arrested for inviting the two to appear on the show.

Public response was furious, against both the band and the broadcaster. MBC cancelled Music Camp, and the Korean Broadcasting Commission considered heavy disciplinary measures. Then mayor of Seoul, Lee Myung-bak suggested that concerts in Seoul's Hongdae neighbourhood be regulated by the authorities, which prompted political rivals to compare Lee to former dictator Park Chung-hee. Future government minister Yu In-chon convinced Lee to step back from his suggestion.

A plot on the tvN drama Plus Nine Boys parodied this incident.

=== 2008–2010 — PD Note ===
==== Mad cow disease ====
On 27 April 2008, PD Note televised the episode "Is American Beef Really Safe from Mad Cow Disease?" which alleged dangers associated with American beef. The South Korean Ministry of Agriculture and Fisheries filed a legal suit against the producers, claiming that the program was biased and exaggerated. The producers were exonerated by the Seoul Central District Court and the Supreme Court in 2010.

==== Four Major Rivers ====
The Korean Ministry of Land, Transport and Maritime Affairs applied for an injunction to stop the airing of a PD Note episode, "The Six-Meter-Deep Secret of the Four Major Rivers," which was scheduled to be broadcast on August 17, 2010. The episode dealt with a controversy about The Four Major Rivers Project launched by the Korean government in 2009, which aimed to develop water resources by securing a sufficient water supply, preventing floods, upgrading water quality and reviving ecosystems, as well as boosting regional economies. The Ministry claimed that the episode contained false information. They requested that the Seoul Southern District Court stop further spread of the false information among the public. Their request was dismissed and the episode aired on 24 August 2010. According to the producers of PD Note, MBC management also requested that they postpone the episode.

=== 2020 — Deepfake pornography ===
On 20 April 2020, MBC News broadcast news about deepfake pornography. MBC used deepfake technology, an AI technology which changes an identity of someone on an image or a video to someone else's likeness. The news sparked outrage among Koreans due to its inappropriate contents. The boy band BTS, the singer IU and other celebrities were used as examples. Viewers and fans of the celebrities used the hashtag #MBC_합성_사과해, to tell MBC to apologise or respond to the incident; it did neither.

=== 2021 — Olympics broadcast ===
During broadcasting of the parade of nations on the 2020 Summer Olympics opening ceremony, MBC was accused domestically and internationally of depicting several countries in racist and offensive ways. The most notable cases were the use of the Chernobyl disaster to represent Ukraine and riots to represent Haiti, which sparked anger among Ukrainians and Haitians. MBC president Park Sung-jae apologised to the public as well as to the nations affected. He apologised to the Embassy of Ukraine and Romania in Seoul at a press conference, and promised to ensure that all MBC content to be respectful towards universal values and cultural diversity. MBC also published an apology on their website. Haitian Foreign Affairs Minister Claude Joseph retorted "their apology didn't go far enough, but the incident shouldn't be allowed to distract from the athletes who have worked tirelessly for years to get to the Olympics". The incident caused national uproar among Koreans, with some accusing MBC of being insensitive and unprofessional.

== See also ==
- MBC Standard FM
- MBC News Now
