= WEER =

WEER may refer to:

- WEER (FM), a radio station (88.7 FM) licensed to serve Montauk, New York, United States
- WEEG, a defunct radio station (90.7 FM) licensed to serve East Hampton, New York, United States which used the WEER call sign from 2008 to 2011
- Weer, a municipality in the district of Schwaz, Tyrol, Austria
- William Weer, a brigadier general in the Union Army during the American Civil War
- WEER (Play), a one-woman show by Natalie Palamides

== See also ==
- Weir (disambiguation)
