= MHz Networks =

American broadcaster

- Type: OTT platform
- Country: United States
- Availability: United States; Canada
- Founded: 2001; 25 years ago
- Headquarters: Falls Church, Virginia
- Owner: Kino Lorber
- Picture format: 720p or 1080i (HDTV); 480i (SDTV)
- Official website: mhznetworks.com

MHz Networks is an American broadcaster that specializes in international television programming.

== Washington, D.C., broadcast operations ==
MHz (pronounced "M-H-Z") Networks began as a project of the Commonwealth Public Broadcasting Corporation. The broadcaster's original stations were WNVT in Goldvein, Virginia, and WNVC in Fairfax, Virginia, which served the Washington, D.C., television market. International programming began on WNVC in 1996, branded "World View TV". In 2001, the two stations became known as MHz Networks, with WNVC becoming MHz1 and WNVT becoming MHz2.

In the digital television era, WNVC and WNVT placed a set of twelve international news channels on their two signals. The final set of channels consisted of TRT World, CGTN America, CGTN Documentary, Africa Today TV, France 24, CNC World, Arirang, TeleSUR, Deutsche Welle, and Vietnet. Previous channels included NHK World, BVN, Al Jazeera English, Blue Ocean Network, SABC News International, NTA, Ethiopian Television, RT America, RT Spanish, VTV4, Euronews, CNC World, and TRT Türk. Two months before the end of broadcast operations in Washington, on February 1, 2018, RT America was dropped from WNVC's signal, apparently due to concerns that MHz Networks or CPBC would be required to register under the Foreign Agents Registration Act.

In 2013, Commonwealth Public Broadcasting Corporation spun off the MHz Networks unit and sold the WNVC and WNVT towers. On April 1, 2018, MHz Networks exited the Washington, D.C. market after CPBC sold the stations' channel allocations in the Federal Communications Commission's ongoing spectrum reallocation auction.

In November 2022, MHz Networks was acquired by film distribution and home video company Kino Lorber.

== MHz Worldview ==
MHz Worldview
- Country: United States

Programming
- Picture format: 480i (SDTV)

Ownership
- Owner: MHz Networks

History
- Launched: October 19, 2005; 21 years ago
- Closed: March 1, 2020; 6 years ago

Links
- Website: mhznetworks.com

MHz Worldview was an independent, American, non-commercial public television network that broadcast newscasts and other programs from around the world. It was owned and operated by MHz Networks.

MHz Worldview offered international newscasts, foreign dramas, music performances, and diversity programming, in English or with subtitles.

The channel was available as a subchannel on several U.S. public TV stations.

On January 8, 2020, MHz Networks announced the closure of MHz Worldview as they transition to digital streaming services. The network shut down at Midnight Eastern Time on March 1, 2020. Near the closure, the many television stations that had programming from MHz switched to different networks. Five stations switched to World Channel, another five to First Nations Experience and another five to DW. MHz Worldview was the main affiliate for WPPT and they switched to PBS. WCFE-TV switched to NHK World-Japan. KMOS-TV started its new independent channel in subchannel 6.3, named KMOS Emerge. KUEN now carries local programming on subchannel 9.2, previously used by MHz Worldview. KWSU-TV removed subchannel 10.3 after MHz Worldview was closed.

=== Former affiliates ===
City	Station	Transitioned to
Akron/Youngstown, Ohio	WEAO 49.3/WNEO 45.3	FNX
Charleston, Illinois	WEIU-TV 51.2	FNX
Chicago, Illinois	WYCC 20.1	FNX
Columbia/Jefferson City, Missouri	KMOS-TV 6.3	KMOS Emerge
Denver, Colorado	KBDI-TV 12.3	Deutsche Welle
Flint/Tri-Cities, Michigan	WDCQ-TV 19.2	World
Las Cruces, New Mexico/El Paso, Texas	KRWG-TV 22.2	World
New York City	WNDT-CD 14.1/WMBQ-CD 46.1	FNX
Orlando, Florida	WDSC-TV 15.3	Deutsche Welle
Philadelphia, Pennsylvania	WPPT 35.1	PBS
Plattsburgh, New York/Burlington, Vermont	WCFE-TV 57.2	NHK World-Japan
Quad Cities, Illinois/Iowa	WQPT-TV 24.2	Deutsche Welle
Pullman/Yakima, Washington	KWSU-TV 10.3/KTNW 31.3	Subchannel removed (10.3); World 31.3
Richmond/Charlottesville, Virginia	WNVT 23.3/WNVC 41.3	World
Rochester, Minnesota	KSMQ-TV 15.2	Deutsche Welle
Salt Lake City, Utah	KUEN 9.2	Local programming
San Francisco/Oakland/San Jose, California	KPJK 60.4	Deutsche Welle
Tacoma/Seattle/Centralia, Washington	KBTC-TV 28.3/KCKA 15.3	FNX
Topeka, Kansas	KTWU 11.2	World

== MHz Choice ==
MHz Choice
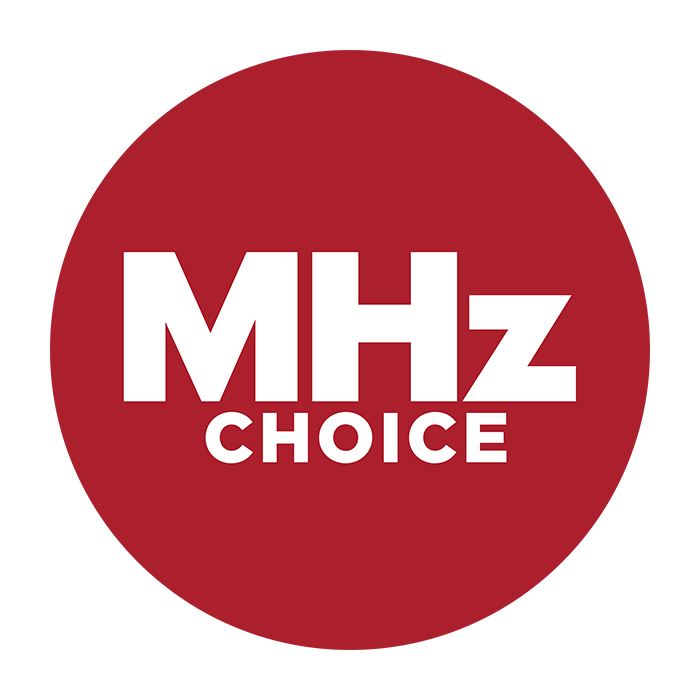
- Country: United States and Canada

Ownership
- Owner: Kino Lorber

History
- Launched: October 20, 2015; 11 years ago

On October 20, 2015, MHz Networks launched an OTT streaming video on demand SVOD service called MHz Choice (pronounced "M-H-Z Choice") in the U.S. The service expanded into Canada in September 2017.

MHz Choice features mysteries, dramas and comedies from MHz Networks' catalog of international programs, unedited with English subtitles. The direct to consumer service is available on the web at mhzchoice.com and on a variety of apps including Android, Android TV, Apple TV, iOS, Fire TV, Roku and the Samsung Smart TV app.

MHz Choice Partners
In November 2016, MHz Choice launched on Amazon Prime Video Channels which gave Amazon Prime members the ability to add an MHz Choice subscription to their Amazon Prime account. In October 2018, MHz Choice launched on Comcast's Xfinity X1's over the internet on-demand service. In April 2019, MHz Choice launched on The Roku Channel as part of Roku's Premium Subscription service.
