= WLIW =

WLIW may refer to:

- WLIW (TV), a television station (channel 32/PSIP 21) licensed to Garden City, New York, United States
- WLIW-FM, a radio station (88.3 FM) licensed to Southampton, New York, United States
