= JBN-TV =

Honduran television channel

JBN-TV (Jesus Broadcasting Network) is a Honduran television channel dedicated to Christianity in the Spanish language. Part of the International Family Network, the channel was founded in 2000 in Tegucigalpa, Honduras.

== History ==
Part of the International Family Network, the television channel was founded by the Manmin Central Church in 2000 in the city of Tegucigalpa, the capital of Honduras. The channel was headed by Esteban Handal, who in the summer of 2002 held a massive crusade at the San Pedro Sula Olympic Stadium to cure illnesses from a massive crowd. JBN-TV's headquarters are in the city of San Pedro Sula, department of Cortés, Honduras.

== Schedule ==
Currently, JBN-TV is also the Honduran satellite channel with the most coverage in international news. JBN-TV offers news, sports, lifestyle and entertainment programs including movies, documentaries, music, reviews, interviews and special events marked by the values of Christianity, and particularly refers to Manmin Central Church, an evangelical church. Founded in Seoul, South Korea, in 1982. JBN-TV transmits through 5,000 cable television companies and 35 television channels throughout Latin America, while in Honduras it transmits with an approximate number of 700 companies throughout the country.

== Diffusion ==
In 2000, JBN TV Canale 39 was founded in the city of Tegucigalpa, later it received the opportunity in 2002 to broadcast its programs throughout the country. Currently, JBN-TV has more than 35 channels in Honduras, including channel 51 in San Pedro Sula. Since May 2006, JBN-TV has been broadcasting 806 NOTICIAS via satellite, reaching more than 700 cables in Honduras and 5,000 in Latin America.

The open frequencies with national coverage are distributed as follows:

- Channel 39: Tegucigalpa, MDC
- Channel 51: Valle de San Pedro Sula, Cortés
- Channel 54: La Ceiba, Tela and the department of Atlántida
- Channel 52: Danlí, Olancho and the eastern sector.
- Channel 51: Choluteca and Valle de Ángeles
- Channel 61: Quimistán Comayagua and central sector Some of its main programs are the morning magazine Buenos Dias (Good Morning) Latinoamérica, which has achieved high audience ratings in public broadcasting since 2009, and its famous international newscast and JBN News in two editions, one at 12 and another at 5 in the afternoon.

== See also ==
- Manmin Central Church
- Jaerock Lee
