= JBN =

JBN or jbn may refer to:

- JBN-TV, a Honduran television channel dedicated to Christianity in the Spanish language
- JBN, the Indian Railways station code for Jogbani railway station, Bihar, India
- jbn, the ISO 639-3 code for Nafusi language, Libya
