= WNDT-CD =

Television station in New York City

Currently dark
- New York, New York; United States
- Channels: Digital: 12 (VHF), shared with WNET; Virtual: 14

Programming
- Affiliations: 14.1: FNX

Ownership
- Owner: The WNET Group; (WNET)
- Sister stations: WEER; WLIW; WLIW-FM; WMBQ-CD; WNET

History
- Founded: 1973
- Former call signs: W73AP (1973–1983); W17AC (1983–1992); W17BM (1992–1997); WEBR-LP (1997–2001); WEBR-CA (2001–2009); WEBR-CD (2009–2018); WNCT-CD (2018)
- Former channel numbers: Analog: 73 (UHF, 1973–1983), 17 (UHF, 1983–2009); Digital: 17 (UHF, 2009–2015), 49 (UHF, 2015–2018)
- Former affiliations: Independent (as translator of WPIX, 1973–1992); The Box (1992–1997); KBS (secondary 1995–1997, primary 1997–2005); HSN (Spanish, secondary, 2001–2002); Korean Network Home Shopping (secondary, 2002–2005); GCN (2005–2013); OnTV4U (2013); Universal Affiliates Network (2013–2018); MHz Worldview (2018–2020)
- Call sign meaning: "New Dimensions in Television" (former call sign for WNET)

Technical information
- Licensing authority: FCC
- Facility ID: 67866
- Class: CD
- ERP: 6.5 kW
- HAAT: 507.8 m (1,666 ft)
- Transmitter coordinates: 40°42′46.8″N 74°0′47.3″W

Links
- Public license information: Public file; LMS
- Website: fnx.org

WNDT-CD (channel 14) is a Class A television station in New York City, which is currently dark. Owned by The WNET Group, it is sister to the city's two PBS member stations—Newark, New Jersey–licensed WNET (channel 13) and Garden City, New York–licensed WLIW (channel 21)—and Class A station WMBQ-CD (channel 46).

Under a channel sharing arrangement, WNDT-CD and WMBQ-CD share transmitter facilities with WNET at One World Trade Center. Despite WNDT-CD and WMBQ-CD legally holding low-power class A licenses, they transmit using WNET's full-power spectrum. This ensures complete reception across the New York City television market.

In addition to FNX programming, WNDT-CD airs some news and public affairs shows from WNET and NJ PBS.

== History ==
=== W73AP and W17AC (1973–1992) ===
The station was signed on over UHF channel 73 in 1973 by its original owner, WPIX, Inc., as W73AP. It was one of multiple television broadcast translators in New York City that operated at the upper end of the UHF television band to provide reliable coverage to sections of New York City where reception was compromised by the construction of the World Trade Center. It relayed WPIX, which operates over VHF channel 11.

Originally, most of the New York City television stations operated their main transmitters from the Empire State Building. However, reliable reception was compromised for some viewers once the majority of the World Trade Center was constructed, thus necessitating the use of the UHF translators. In response, nearly all of the TV stations, including WPIX, relocated to the North Tower of the World Trade Center in 1975.

In 1982, UHF channels 70 through 83 were decommissioned for use as television stations, and the frequencies were reassigned for the Advanced Mobile Phone System (AMPS), an analog mobile phone system standard developed by Bell Labs that was officially introduced in the Americas in 1983. TV stations operating on these channels were either displaced to in-core broadcast channels, sold, or deleted.

WPIX filed for displacement around this time, and the station's translator was reallocated to channel 17 with the new alpha-numeric call sign W17AC, reflecting the station's new channel number. The station continued to operate as a relay for WPIX.

More than a year after WPIX became a Tribune Broadcasting station outright in 1991 and expanded coverage in New York City, New Jersey and Long Island over the air and through cable, it was unnecessary to keep channel 17 as a backup translator. WPIX sold channel 17 to Trimtab Productions, Inc., in 1992, and the station went off the air shortly thereafter.

=== W17BM (1992–1997) ===
On November 9, 1992, the call sign was changed to W17BM, reflecting the station's transfer of ownership. Empire Broadcasting at that point became the operator through Trimtab Productions. It was then programmed as an affiliate of The Box, airing music videos. In 1995, the station branded as KTV airing KBS Korean programming along with The Box during the day and on weekends.

=== WEBR-LP (1997–2001) ===
On April 22, 1997, the call-sign was changed to WEBR-LP, which stands for Empire BRoadcasting. Trimtab Productions and Empire Broadcasting were later sold to K Licensee, Inc., the owner of NY Radio Korea, who programmed the station as the affiliate of KBS with Korean programming. K Licensee, Inc., later changed its corporate name to K Media, Inc. In 1997, The Box was removed and it ran Korean programming full-time. Over the years it added news programming called KTV news and 1 hour radio public affairs each week along with foreign news like YTN, which was added later that year. Also, community a calendar was added during weeknights after the local news programming ended. During the day, it aired most of the KBS programming along with a 30-minute children's program from that station in Korean.

=== WEBR-CA (2001–2009) ===
On March 5, 2001, the call-sign suffix was changed to WEBR-CA, reflecting the station's new Class A status. Korean programming and KBS were broadcast from 5 p.m. to 1 p.m, while HSN Spanish ran from 1 to 5 p.m. on weekdays and on weekends. On September 11, 2001, the affiliate temporarily switched to CNN, which aired news coverage as a backup after the planes hit the main transmitter on the north tower. In 2002, HSN Spanish was replaced with the Korean shopping channel KNH. The format stayed the same. Later that year, it ran from 1 a.m. to 7 am. This lasted until mid-2005, when the programming was temporarily changed back to KBS along with Korean programming. GCN (Global Christian Network) programming began on September 1, 2005. At that time, it aired three hours of repeated programming for six weeks. Some of the programming came from out-of-market religious ministries such as sermons by Korean pastor Jaerock Lee, Quick Study, Day Of Discovery, and some of the promo programming throughout most of the day for a couple of weeks. Children's programming was added on Saturdays from 7 to 10 a.m. and from 8 to 10 p.m. to fill most of the gaps. Also, testimony concerts aired each week on Wednesdays and Saturdays. Additional programming was added in multiple languages on October 10, 2005. After the transition, some of the promos were dropped and more religious programming was added. Children's programming was extended to one hour each day and 2 hours during the morning and evenings on weekends. The following year, religious news programming was added from CBN along with Worship Network music videos. Later that year, movies were added each week.

=== WEBR-CD (2009–2018) ===
Logo as WEBR-CD

On September 16, 2009, the call sign was changed to WEBR-CD. The religious format stayed mostly the same except the station ID was classified as "WEBR 17 New York", while WEBR-CD 17 was only used on 17.2, re-branding as KTV.

As a condition for its continued operation on Channel 17, WEBR-CD cannot cause harmful interference to operations on Channel 16, as frequencies on that channel are used for public safety communications systems within New York City. The station has an agreement with the New York Metropolitan Advisory Committee (NYMAC) that requires any operation on Channel 17 to be reduced or ceased should any interference occur to the public safety operations. Any proposed modifications to the respective operations by either the NYMAC or Channel 17 must be made known to the other party, and responses from the other party must be included within such public filings.

WEBR-CD operates at significantly less wattage than its analog predecessor. It also operates with a stringent mask filter, which reduces emissions so the channel 17 signal will not exceed -123 DBM within the NYMAC assigned spectrum.

On March 20, 2012, K Licensee Inc., agreed to sell WEBR-CD to OTA Broadcasting, a company controlled by Michael Dell's MSD Capital, for $6.6 million. On April 30, 2012, the license was officially transferred. The deal closed on June 15, 2012. Prior to the transfer of ownership of OTA Broadcasting, the GCN format stayed the same for a couple of months before being taken off the air in 2013. With GCN moving to sub channel 17.3, another format was added and it is currently airing infomercials. Later in 2013, it switched to the Universal Affiliates Network, which airs movies, local programming, religious programming, and mostly infomercials during the day. In 2015, WEBR moved to digital channel 49 for the first time in 32 years.

In the Federal Communications Commission (FCC)'s incentive auction, WEBR-CD sold its spectrum for $72,817,599 and indicated that it would enter into a post-auction channel sharing agreement. On October 30, 2017, the station entered into a channel sharing agreement with WNET (channel 13); concurrently, OTA Broadcasting agreed to donate the WEBR license to WNET. The donation was completed on December 22, 2017; the next day, WEBR-CD was taken off the air while WNET prepared to move the shared transmitter to the World Trade Center.

=== WNCT-CD and WNDT-CD (2018–present) ===
The call letters were changed to WNCT-CD on March 15, 2018, and to WNDT-CD on March 22. In November 2018, WNDT-CD returned on its new channel 13 as a non-commercial network affiliate of MHz Worldview. WNDT currently is seen on its virtual channel 14. In addition to multi-ethnic programming, it also simulcasts NJTV news along with the daily public affairs program Metrofocus. Local programming children's shows air on Saturday afternoons from WNET. After MHz Networks announced in January that MHz Worldview will cease operations by March 1, 2020, in favor of digital streaming, WNET switched its programming to First Nations Experience.

== Technical information ==
=== Subchannel ===
Subchannels of WNET and WNDT-CD
License	Subchannel	Res.	Short name	Programming
WNET	13.1	1080i	WNET-HD	PBS
WNET	13.2	480i	KIDS	PBS Kids
WNET	13.3	480i	World	World
WNET	21.1	1080i	WLIW-HD	PBS (WLIW)
WNET	21.3	480i	NHK	NHK World (WLIW)
WNET	21.4	1080i	AllArts	All Arts (WLIW)
WNDT-CD	14.1	480i	WNDT-CD	First Nations Experience

Broadcast on behalf of another station

In late November 2009, WEBR added MBC-D after Newton, New Jersey–based WMBC-TV dropped it in favor of a new network, CGN, a Korean Christian network that was later moved to 63.2 and is now a Sinovision English affiliate. A couple of weeks later, NY Radio Korea, an aural service, was added on 17.4.

Effective March 1, 2011, MBC-D programming was discontinued on 17.2. Replacing it is a slide reading "KTV 17.2" with audio from NY Radio Korea—the same as is carried on 17.4—albeit slightly louder. The virtual channel information still identifies 17-2 as MBCD.

In summer 2011, a fourth subchannel, 17.3, was added as GCN, replacing primary channel 17.1 as infomercials. However, as of January, the entire GCN programming was removed, leaving only two subchannels blank without audio. The KTV slide was discontinued with the KRB audio remaining. The same aural programming is replicated on 17.4. As of mid-2013, subchannels were removed, leaving only the main channel 17.1. Earlier that year, GCN programming returned to channel 17.3. Following the donation to WNET, UAN and GCN subchannel programming was replaced with MHz Worldview. Originally All Arts was supposed to air on WNDT-CD in late January, but it was picked up by WLIW as a fourth subchannel.

=== Analog-to-digital conversion ===
In August 2009, the station flash-cut to a low-power DTV signal, and the call sign suffix was changed to CD, reflecting the station's Class A status using digital transmission.
