= Thirteen Revisited =

Thirteen Revisited is a 1987 anthology series presented by WNET in celebration of its silver anniversary. Each program is a repeat of an older WNET-produced program from the '60s and the '70s, with a select few from the '80s.

== Programs ==
- September 16, 1987: The Great American Dream Machine: "Highlights Part 6" (originally broadcast September 18, 1974), NET Playhouse: "Ten Blocks on the Camino Real" (originally broadcast October 6, 1966), and Soul!: "Wonder Love" (originally broadcast November 19, 1972)
- September 20, 1987: TV Lab: "The Lathe of Heaven" (originally broadcast January 9, 1980)
- September 27, 1987: Bill Moyers Journal: "An Essay on Watergate" (originally broadcast October 31, 1973)
- October 4, 1987: Fanfare: "Gertrude Stein: When This You See, Remember Me" (originally broadcast December 20, 1970)
- October 11, 1987: NET Playhouse: "Let Me Hear You Whisper" (originally broadcast May 22, 1969)
- October 18, 1987: Public Broadcasting Laboratory: "Law and Order" (originally broadcast March 2, 1969)
- November 8, 1987: Theater in America: "Feasting with Panthers" (originally broadcast March 27, 1974)
- November 22, 1987: NET Journal: "What Harvest for the Reaper?" (originally broadcast February 5, 1968) and "Who Invited Us?" (originally broadcast February 16, 1970)
- November 29, 1987: NET Playhouse Biography: "Lorraine Hansbury: To Be Young, Gifted and Black" (originally broadcast January 20, 1972)
- December 6, 1987: Nature: "Forest in the Clouds" (originally broadcast November 21, 1982)
- December 20, 1987: Great Performances: Live from Lincoln Center: "Juilliard at 80" (originally broadcast October 5, 1985)
- December 27, 1987: Fanfare: "Welcome to the Fillmore East" (originally broadcast October 11, 1970)
