= WLIW (TV) =

Television station in Garden City, New York

ATSC 3.0 station
- Garden City–New York, New York; United States
- City: Garden City, New York
- Channels: Digital: 32 (UHF), shared with WMBQ-CD; Virtual: 21
- Branding: WLIW 21

Programming
- Affiliations: 21.1: PBS; for others, see § Subchannels

Ownership
- Owner: The WNET Group; (WNET)
- Sister stations: WEER; WLIW-FM; WMBQ-CD; WNDT-CD; WNET

History
- First air date: January 14, 1969
- Former channel numbers: Analog: 21 (UHF, 1969–2009); Digital: 22 (UHF, 1999–2009), 21 (UHF, 2009–2019)
- Former affiliations: NET (1969–1970)
- Call sign meaning: Long Island

Technical information
- Licensing authority: FCC
- Facility ID: 38336
- ERP: 72 kW
- HAAT: 495.6 m (1,626 ft)
- Transmitter coordinates: 40°42′46.8″N 74°0′47.3″W

Links
- Public license information: Public file; LMS
- Website: www.wliw.org

WLIW (channel 21) is a secondary PBS member television station licensed to Garden City, New York, United States, serving the New York City television market. It is owned by The WNET Group alongside the area's primary PBS member, Newark, New Jersey–licensed WNET (channel 13); two Class A stations, WNDT-CD (channel 14) and WMBQ-CD (channel 46, which shares spectrum with WLIW); and NPR member WLIW-FM (88.3) in Southampton.

WLIW and WNET share studios at One Worldwide Plaza in Midtown Manhattan with an auxiliary street-level studio in the Lincoln Center complex on Manhattan's Upper West Side. WLIW's transmitter is located at One World Trade Center; the station also maintains a production studio at its former transmitter site in Plainview, New York. WLIW's multiplex is New York's high-power ATSC 3.0 (NextGen TV) television station and also broadcasts WMBQ-CD.

WLIW was established in 1969 as the first television station on Long Island. Originally operated on a tight budget, the station had no permanent studio facilities for nearly a decade. In the 1980s and 1990s, increasing cable television coverage led to the expansion of WLIW into a regional service that was the smaller competitor to WNET, the nation's largest public TV station, and the station increased its own programming efforts. However, some critics felt that this shift deemphasized the station's Long Island identity. In 2003, WLIW and WNET merged, completing an 18-month process. As part of the WNET Group, WLIW maintains a separate vice president and general manager, Diane Masciale, who is in charge of the entire group's locally oriented television production.

== History ==
=== Early history ===
The Nassau County Board of Supervisors voted on February 14, 1968, to provide funding to set up an educational television station on Long Island, thereby also accessing matching funds from the New York state government. The Long Island Educational Television Council then applied for and, in June, received a construction permit for channel 21 at Garden City. Facilities were established on the campus of Nassau Community College, while a 60-hour broadcast week evenly split between in-school instructional and general cultural offerings was slated. Test programming from Long Island's first TV station was aired beginning on January 14, 1969, with the station still not completely set up and technicians using screwdrivers to adjust audio levels including a series of hearings on the Long Island Rail Road. Official broadcasting did not begin until January 27.

WLIW operated on a very tight budget—so tight that its founding general manager, public television veteran William Pearce, resigned after four months to return to his prior employer, WXXI-TV in Rochester. It lacked a full studio of its own or its own mobile broadcasting equipment, and it spent seven months without a new leader as other public television managers turned down the post. Color telecasts only began with the installation of color video tape machines in December 1972, nearly four years after the station started up. The station finally got studio space when it moved in to the New York Institute of Technology (NYIT) in Westbury in 1974, but that arrangement lasted two years. Station operations were then moved into a mobile van, which some employees claimed was due to a vote by technicians to unionize. As the station investigated studio space at Stony Brook University, it also received federal approval and matching grants to move its transmitter to Plainview and increase power to cover all of Long Island.

A year of major change would mark 1979 for WLIW. In February, the new Plainview transmitter site and studios, at the highest point on Long Island, was activated, significantly improving reception and extending channel 21's reach and capabilities. However, internal strife dominated the second half of the year. Charles R. Bell, who had been general manager since Pearce's departure, accused some of the station's trustees with interfering in programming decisions to further political ambitions and the goals of a political strategy firm which one of them headed. The trustees responded by voting not to renew Bell's contract.

John Wicklein assumed the manager post in February 1980 and sought to give the station an identity independent from that of WNET and additional local programming and support. He was also tasked with erasing a $250,000 deficit from the building programs of the late 1970s that had forced layoffs and program suspensions. When other public television stations in the state visited WLIW, their leaders assessed additional non-financial problems at the station: an acceptance of living in the shadow of WNET and a "defeatist" attitude. Its ability to attract local support was eclipsed by stations serving far fewer people, such as WCFE-TV in Plattsburgh. Wicklein left after three months and soon was replaced by Arthur Gillick of Syracuse. Gillick was able to steady the station's financial picture and restore the lost local programs as a result, though further local cuts led to the loss of the station's news programming for a time beginning in 1982. He served as general manager until his December 1983 death from cancer at the age of 35.

The 1980s would bring expanded coverage for WLIW in New York, New Jersey, and Connecticut, thanks to increased carriage on cable systems. A station that in 1985 was still trying to recover from its attempt to be a "junior Channel 13" in the eyes of William Renn, a professor at Hofstra University, had by 1990 leaned into its growing reach, with 62 percent of its members coming from outside Long Island and a viewership that put it in the top ten nationally among public TV stations. It also was profitable for the first time in its history. Despite this, political leaders on Long Island continued to clamor for increased local programming. The station also had to fight for its expanded cable carriage after must-carry rules were abolished in 1985. Some cable providers dropped the station citing duplication to WNET and to the station's over-the-air broadcast. Paragon Cable's Manhattan system dropped WLIW in 1987 and replaced it with the Cable Value Network, a home shopping channel, only to restore it weeks later after protests from subscribers.

The early 1990s saw funding cutbacks that once again prompted the cancellation of local productions as the economy took a nosedive; state support of public television declined, and New York state instituted cutbacks across government. This spurred the further evolution of WLIW into a regional service as well as a reduced reliance on PBS programs to differentiate the station from WNET. WLIW was a founder of the Program Resources Group, a 13-station alliance consisting of secondary public TV stations formed to buy programs, and reduced the proportion of PBS programming on its schedule from between 80 and 90 percent to 30 percent while debuting more British programming. In 1998, the station began a 10-year association with the BBC to distribute BBC World News to public television stations in the United States; WLIW had previously offered news from ITN. (Note: WNET and WLIW dropped BBC World News in 2008 to launch Worldfocus, their own international news program for public television. It was canceled in 2010 for financial reasons, at which time the BBC program returned to the stations.)

By 2001, WLIW had an office in Manhattan, at which 15 of its 65 employees worked. It also increased its production efforts to the point that 20 percent of its $11 million budget was attributed to selling its output—including ethnic documentaries such as A Laugh, a Tear, a Mitzvah—to other public TV stations. These were particularly popular for station pledge drives; by the time WLIW and WNET merged in 2003, channel 21 was the leading distributor of such programs, including versions complete with pledge breaks seen nationally, and WLIW manager Terrel Cass attributed the station's continued survival to its foray into national program production. The station also maintained distribution of CNBC's program Louis Rukeyser's Wall Street for public television stations, which ran from 2002 to 2004.

=== Merger with WNET ===
Stimulated by the impending conversion to digital television and necessary equipment expenditures, as well as a grant from the Corporation for Public Broadcasting to explore shared master control functions, WLIW and WNET began engaging in discussions on how to pool primarily technical resources in 2000. At the initial suggestion of WNET, these conversations soon blossomed into outright merger talks, which lasted months as board members expressed reservations over potential changes and the loss of WLIW's Long Island identity.

A merger agreement was approved by the WLIW board on July 31, 2001, under which WNET would assume WLIW's operations and eight members of the WLIW board would join WNET's. The move would save WLIW $5 million in digital conversion costs and reduce duplication of shows between the stations, which would "retain their distinct public identities". It also was met with some opposition on Long Island. One WLIW board member resigned over what she felt was a reduction of local programming, and longtime Newsday television columnist Marvin Kitman decried an "assault on the public interest" which he compared to appeasement toward Nazi Germany. While the merger awaited federal approval, channel 21 stepped up during the September 11 attacks by rebroadcasting WNBC and WABC-TV, which lost their World Trade Center transmitter site; WNBC had previously broadcast over channel 21 during the 1993 World Trade Center bombing.

The WNET–WLIW merger took 18 months to complete, as the FCC objected to a part of the merger agreement that required WNET to air specific amounts of local programming on WLIW. FCC approval was eventually obtained, and the deal was consummated on January 31, 2003. The deal created operational efficiencies—WLIW eliminated 20 positions in anticipation of the merger. While the Educational Broadcasting Corporation (the present-day WNET Group) became the licensee, the Long Island Educational Television Council was retained as an advisory board and fundraising arm. In 2010, the WNET Group leased space in One Worldwide Plaza for its new studios and opened a streetside studio at Lincoln Center.

WLIW's programming, aside from featuring a block of British programs known as High Tea, also contains secondary PBS output. In 2015, WNET announced plans to move POV and Independent Lens to WLIW because they failed to hold the viewership of the preceding program, Antiques Roadshow.

In 2019, the WNET Group expanded its presence on Long Island to radio by buying Southampton public radio station WPPB (88.3 FM), covering eastern Long Island, and rebranding it as WLIW-FM the next year.

== Local programming ==
Nationally distributed public television programming presented by WLIW includes Consuelo Mack WealthTrack, which has been in production since 2005, and Miffy and Friends, a Dutch-based production which aired on local stations from 2007. Programs of local interest include WLIW Arts Beat and Treasures of New York. Some programs are shared with the rest of the WNET group, such as MetroFocus (aired on WNET, WLIW, and NJ PBS).

Since 1997, WLIW has produced and distributed the Visions series of programs, using aerial montages to showcase regions and countries. In 2020, WLIW debuted Drive By History, which spotlights roadside history markers on Long Island and in New Jersey.

Historically, the station produced full-length Long Island news programs. The first such program, known as Long Island Newsmagazine and Newsview, was canceled in June 1982 for financial reasons. It was then revived in January 1985, but low ratings motivated the station to cancel The Long Island Report in 1988. A nightly news program was revived in July 1990 with the debut of The 21 Edition; this was canceled the next year due to budget cuts.

== Technical information ==
=== Subchannels ===
In addition to its main channel and the Create and NHK World services, WLIW also offers All Arts, a 24-hour arts channel produced by The WNET Group and launched in 2019. On April 1, 2026, World Channel, which was formerly broadcast on 21.3, became a subchannel of sister station WNET to broadcast NHK World which was moved from NJ PBS.

Subchannels provided by WLIW (ATSC 1.0)
Subchannel	Res.	Short name	Programming	ATSC 1.0 host
21.1	1080i	WLIW-HD	PBS	WNET
21.2	480i	CREATE	Create	WCBS-TV
21.3	480i	NHK	NHK World	WNET
21.4	1080i	AllArts	All Arts	WNET

Subchannels of WLIW and WMBQ-CD (ATSC 3.0)
License	Subchannel	Res.	Short name	Programming
WLIW	2.1	1080p	WCBS-HD	CBS (WCBS-TV)
WLIW	4.1	1080p	WNBC-HD	NBC (WNBC)
WLIW	13.1	1080p	WNET-HD	PBS (WNET)
WLIW	21.1	1080p	WLIW-HD	PBS
WLIW	47.1	1080p	WNJU-HD	Telemundo (WNJU)
WMBQ-CD	46.1	480i	WMBQ-CD	First Nations Experience

Subchannel broadcast with digital rights management

=== Analog-to-digital conversion ===
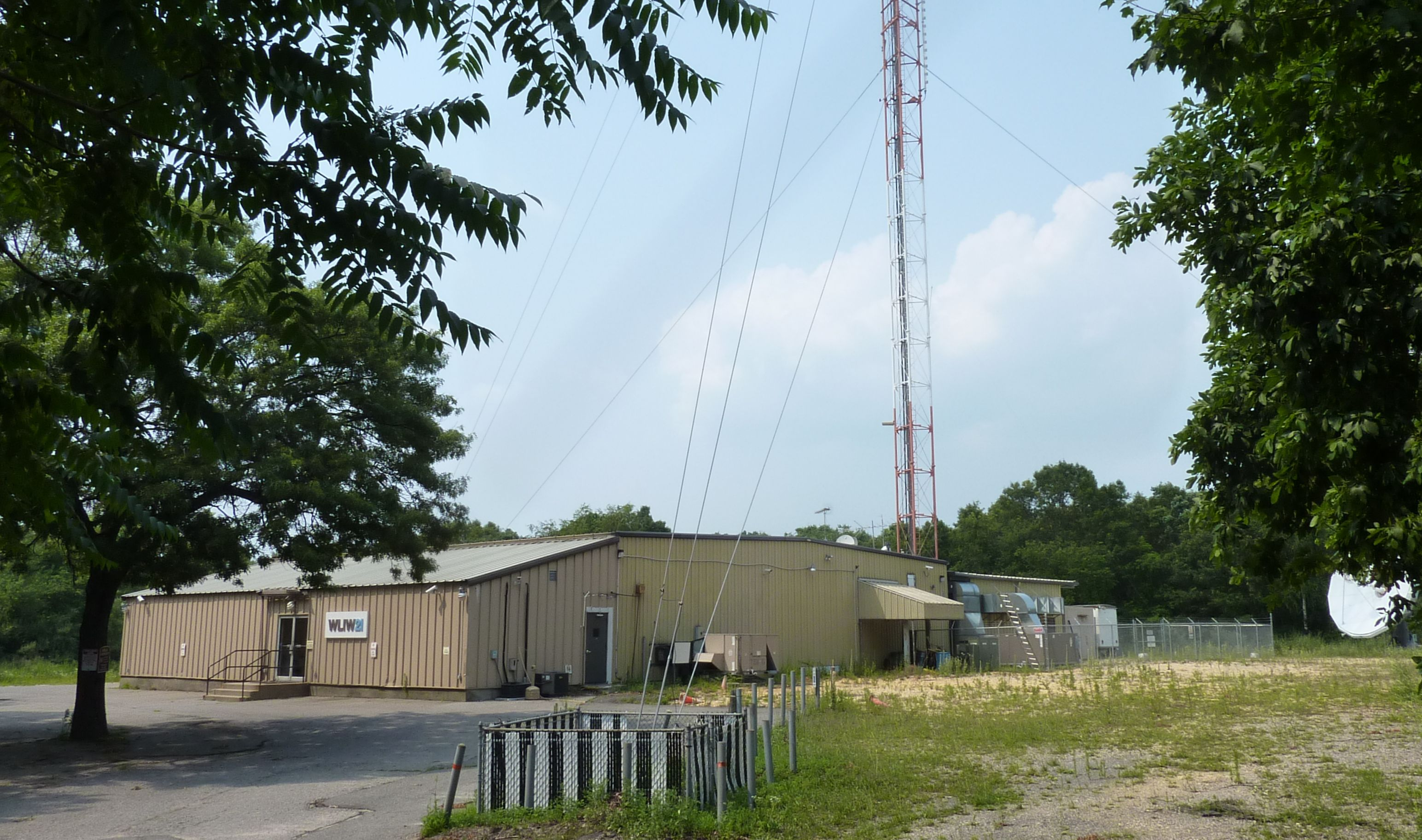
The WLIW facility in Plainview pre-renovation in 2010. Until 2019, WLIW also transmitted from Plainview.

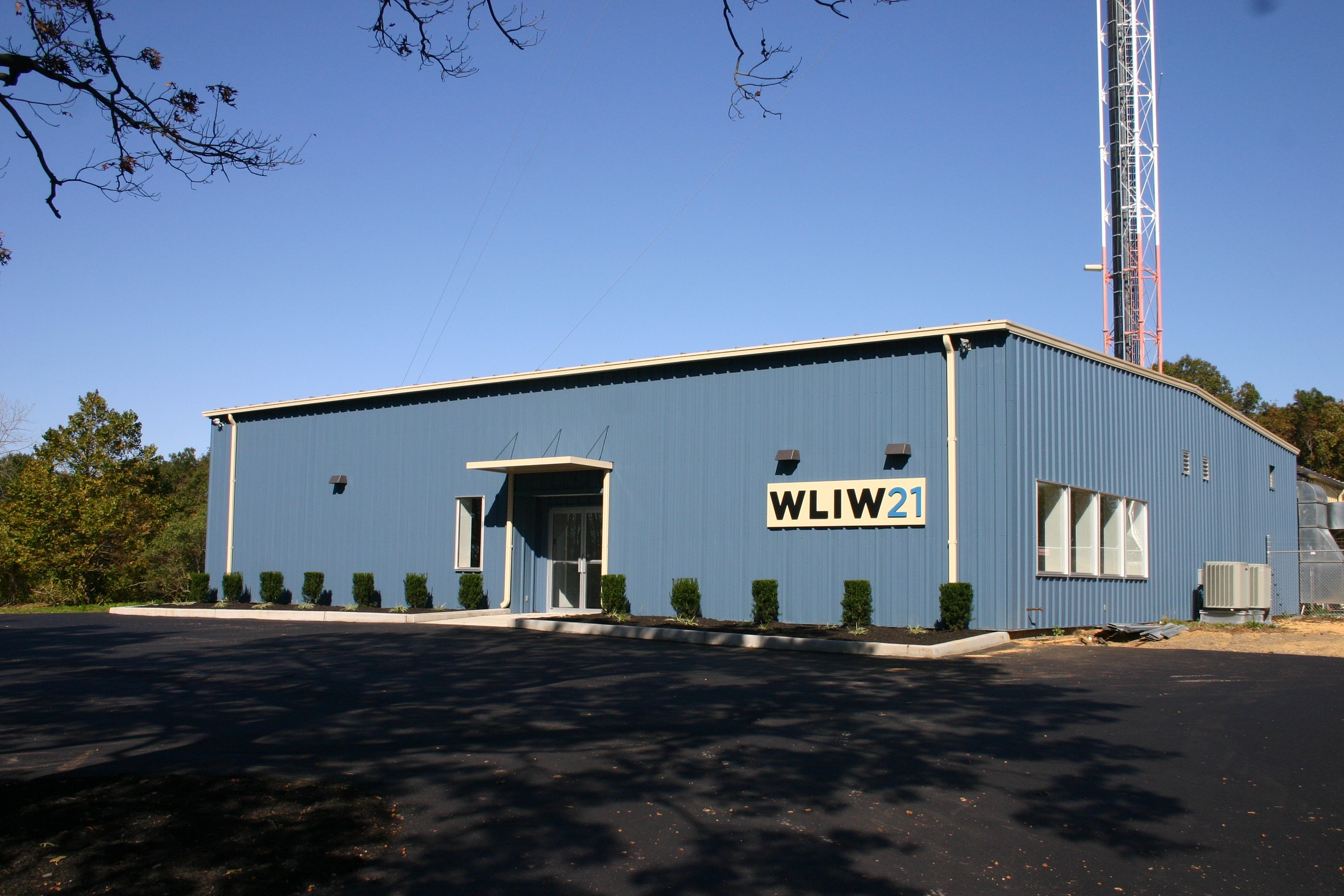
The WLIW facility circa 2011, after renovations

WLIW ended regular programming on its analog signal, over UHF channel 21, on June 12, 2009, as part of the federally mandated transition from analog to digital television. The station's digital signal relocated from its pre-transition UHF channel 22 to channel 21. The WNET Group relocated WLIW's transmitter from Plainview to One World Trade Center in 2019, coinciding with the repack from channel 21 to channel 32.

=== ATSC 3.0 ===
On February 1, 2022, The WNET Group announced plans to convert WLIW into an ATSC 3.0 television station. As part of the plan, WLIW would move its ATSC 1.0 broadcast to its sister station, WNET, while WLIW would additionally carry ATSC 3.0 broadcasts from WNET and NJ PBS in addition to WLIW's own broadcast. An estimated launch date for the end of 2022 was given.

The WNET Group filed revised 3.0 plans in September 2023 and launched ATSC 3.0 service on October 16, 2023. WNET took three of the four subchannels on its multiplex, with WCBS-TV broadcasting Create on channel 21's behalf, and WLIW hosted 3.0 signals for WLIW and WNET plus WCBS-TV, WNBC-TV, and WNJU. In addition, WNET Group-owned WMBQ-CD moved from the WNET multiplex to the WLIW multiplex, reducing overlap to WNDT-CD, both of which are shared-spectrum Class A stations airing First Nations Experience.
