= WCFE-TV =

Television station in Plattsburgh, New York

- Plattsburgh, New York; Burlington–Montpelier, Vermont; United States
- City: Plattsburgh, New York
- Channels: Digital: 36 (UHF); Virtual: 57
- Branding: Mountain Lake PBS; Mountain Lake Journal (newscasts)

Programming
- Affiliations: 57.1: PBS; 57.2: NHK World; 57.3: PBS Kids

Ownership
- Owner: Mountain Lake Public Telecommunications Council

History
- First air date: March 6, 1977
- Former call signs: WNNE-TV (CP, 1970–1975)
- Former channel numbers: Analog: 57 (UHF, 1977–2009); Digital: 38 (UHF, 2004–2020)
- Call sign meaning: Clinton, Franklin and Essex counties, New York (primary coverage area)

Technical information
- Licensing authority: FCC
- Facility ID: 46755
- ERP: 67 kW
- HAAT: 741.7 m (2,433 ft)
- Transmitter coordinates: 44°41′43″N 73°52′59″W
- Translator(s): see § Translators

Links
- Public license information: Public file; LMS
- Website: mountainlake.org

WCFE-TV (channel 57) is a PBS member television station licensed to Plattsburgh, New York, United States, serving the Champlain Valley and Greater Montreal areas. Owned by the Mountain Lake Public Telecommunications Council, the station maintains studios at One Sesame Street in Plattsburgh, and its transmitter is located atop Lyon Mountain, between Plattsburgh and nearby Malone. WCFE-TV is branded as Mountain Lake PBS; this name was adopted to reflect Plattsburgh's location between the Adirondacks and Lake Champlain.

WCFE-TV services northeastern New York, most of Vermont, Eastern Ontario, Canada (including Cornwall and parts of Ottawa), and parts of Southern Quebec (including Montreal) on cable, and parts of New Hampshire and northern New York east of Massena on satellite.

== History ==
WCFE-TV signed on March 6, 1977, from its studios at SUNY Plattsburgh. In 1993, it rebranded itself as "Mountain Lake PBS" to reflect its growing viewership.

From 1990 to 1996, WCFE-TV had a sister NPR station, WCFE-FM 91.9. However, in a case of exceptionally bad timing, WCFE-FM signed on just as North Country Public Radio began building a number of satellites and repeaters in the WCFE-TV service area. It did not help matters that much of the area got a strong signal from Vermont Public Radio flagship WVPS in Burlington. It soon became apparent that Plattsburgh was too small for a standalone NPR station to be viable. Realizing that it was up against two established public radio broadcasters with more resources than it could hope to match, Mountain Lake sold WCFE-FM to Albany's WAMC in 1996, who operates 91.9 as a repeater, WCEL.

=== 2007 transmitter tower collapse ===
On April 18, 2007, WCFE's 400-foot (122 m) transmitter tower located on Lyon Mountain completely collapsed as a result of heavy amounts of ice and snow from the April 2007 Nor'easter, and partially damaged the transmitter building at the base. The station started rebuilding a transmitter tower. In the meantime, the direct fiber optic lines to the local Charter Communications franchise were unaffected, and the station continued to broadcast on cable. On April 23, 2007, WCFE-TV went back on the air as a temporary digital subchannel of WCAX-TV, broadcast from Mount Mansfield, Vermont. WCFE-TV was multicast on WCAX's digital channel 53, mapped to virtual channel 57.1. On August 10, 2007, WCAX-TV discontinued carriage of WCFE-TV, when interim facilities were established.

Following the collapse, cable viewers outside of the New York side of the Plattsburgh–Burlington market had to rely on distant affiliates for PBS programming. Cable systems in Vermont and some systems in Montérégie continued to have access to Vermont Public Television stations, while Videotron systems in the latter region that offered WCFE-TV substituted its signal with that of Detroit's WTVS. On April 27, WCFE-TV's signal was reestablished on Videotron, which received WCFE-TV's signal from its temporary transmitter.

In addition, WPTZ donated its internet streaming facilities to WCFE-TV, which was used for WCFE-TV's annual Art Auction, which took place as scheduled, shortly after the collapse.

The transmitter that was damaged was a Thomson TBM unit. The company was able to provide one of their Affinity transmitters on lease to the station within two weeks of getting the request from the station. This temporary transmitter was located at the station's studio location until they could get the main transmitter facility repaired (which was a very involved process due to site access issues).

On October 9, 2007, WCFE-TV's new tower at Lyon Mountain went into service, almost six months after the collapse. WCFE-TV's digital signal went on the air on October 23.

== Challenges ==
WCFE-TV is in a unique market. Across Lake Champlain to the east lies the city of Burlington, Vermont, home to another PBS member station: Vermont PBS. To the west lies Watertown, home to PBS member WPBS-TV/WNPI-DT. As a result, most of WCFE-TV's broadcast area viewers are served by two PBS members. For years, WCFE-TV has searched for a way to stand out.

One of its solutions has been to broadcast certain various signature PBS shows at different dates and times from the national PBS schedule, much as New York City's secondary PBS outlet, WLIW has done to differentiate itself from the market's primary PBS member, WNET (which also owns WLIW).

This practice has always been somewhat controversial amongst WCFE-TV's members, especially those who do not live in overlapping broadcast areas. As a result, the station has reduced the practice somewhat, and has taken to airing a number of the most popular PBS shows in pattern with the national schedule.

WCFE-TV is the second-smallest PBS member in New York state, ahead of only WPBS/WNPI. However, it reaches a potential audience of 3.9 million people. The great majority of its audience lives in Canada; Montreal alone has 10 times as many people as the Burlington–Plattsburgh market. Additionally, of its 8,500 members (as of August 2007), 4,500 live in Canada. Not only must WCFE-TV take Canadian interests into account in its programming, but its large Canadian viewership has an impact in its fundraising activities. It not only includes French-language elements in its fundraising efforts, but a significant portion of the proceeds from its pledge drives is in Canadian dollars. The station operates a separate fundraising arm for its Canadian viewers, Canadian Friends of Mountain Lake PBS.

WCFE-TV's American coverage area consists mostly of rural areas and small towns. The only major urban centers are Montreal and Burlington.

== Technical information ==
=== Subchannels ===
The station's signal is multiplexed:

Subchannels of WCFE-TV
Channel	Res.	Short name	Programming
57.1	1080i	MLPBSHD	PBS
57.2	480i	NHK-WOR	NHK World
57.3	480i	MLKIDS	PBS Kids

=== Translators ===
- W25AT-D Tupper Lake
- W25BT-D Monkton, VT
- W29EW-D Willsboro

=== Analog-to-digital conversion ===
WCFE-TV began simulcasting digital and analog signals in early 2005.

WCFE-TV shut down its analog signal, over UHF channel 57, on February 17, 2009, the original target date on which full-power television stations in the United States were to transition from analog to digital broadcasts under federal mandate (which was later pushed back to June 12, 2009). The station's digital signal remained on its pre-transition UHF channel 38, using virtual channel 57.

Until the beginning of 2010, an SD simulcast of WCFE-TV was broadcast on 57.2, while ThinkBright was broadcast on 57.3. From January to September 2010, Classic Arts Showcase was on 57.3.

As a part of the repacking process following the 2016–2017 FCC incentive auction, WCFE-TV relocated to UHF channel 36 on July 2, 2020.
