= WMBQ-CD =

Television station in New York City

ATSC 3.0 station Currently dark
- New York, New York; United States
- Channels: Digital: 32 (UHF), shared with WLIW; Virtual: 46
- Branding: WMBQ FNX

Programming
- Affiliations: 46.1: FNX

Ownership
- Owner: The WNET Group; (WNET)
- Sister stations: WEER; WLIW; WLIW-FM; WNDT-CD; WNET

History
- Founded: February 11, 1993
- First air date: March 13, 1997
- Former call signs: W22BM (1993–1998); WLBX-LP (1998–2004); WMBQ-CA (2004–2012)
- Former channel numbers: Analog: 22 (UHF, 1997–2006), 46 (UHF, 2006–2012); Digital: 46 (UHF, 2012–2017), 13 (VHF, 2017–2023)
- Former affiliations: The Box (1997–2001); MTV2 (2001–2006); Cornerstone Television (2006–2008, 2008–2012); Dark (2008, 2017–2018); Infomercials (2012, 2013); Soi TV (2012–2013); Biz TV (2013–2017); MHz Worldview (2018–2020)
- Call sign meaning: Manhattan, Brooklyn, Queens

Technical information
- Licensing authority: FCC
- Facility ID: 14322
- Class: CD
- ERP: 72 kW
- HAAT: 495.6 m (1,626 ft)
- Transmitter coordinates: 40°42′46.8″N 74°0′47.3″W

Links
- Public license information: Public file; LMS
- Website: wnet.org

WMBQ-CD (channel 46) is a class A television station in New York City, which is currently dark. Owned by The WNET Group, it is sister station to the city's two PBS member stations, Newark, New Jersey–licensed WNET (channel 13) and Garden City, New York–licensed WLIW (channel 21), as well as WNDT-CD (channel 14).

Under a channel sharing arrangement, WMBQ-CD shares transmitter facilities with WLIW at One World Trade Center. Despite WMBQ-CD legally holding a low-power class A license, it transmits using WLIW's full-power spectrum. This ensures complete reception across the New York City television market.

== History ==
=== As W22BM and WLBX-LP ===
A construction permit for UHF channel 22 in Cranford, New Jersey, was granted to Craig Fox with alpha-numeric call-sign W22BM on February 11, 1993; it signed on in March 1997. The call-sign was changed to WLBX-LP on April 24, 1998. WLBX-LP was previously an affiliate of The Box until that network's acquisition by Viacom in 2001; the station then carried MTV2 like many other former Box stations. On September 11, 2001, WLBX-LP aired footage from CNN and TechTV.

=== As WMBQ ===
The call sign was changed to WMBQ-CA in 2004. In 2006, Renard Communications Corp. (the Craig Fox-controlled company that by then held the license) began transitioning to a new studio and transmitter they were constructing in Manhattan. Due to this change, WMBQ-CA was displaced from channel 22 to channel 46, and the city of license was changed from Cranford to New York City. On August 17, 2007, Renard Communications Corp. announced that would sell its three stations to Equity Media Holdings for $8 million. However, the transaction had a closing deadline set for June 1, 2008, and either party could cancel the sale if it were not completed by then. The sale had not been consummated by June 19 of that year, as the company was making budget cuts elsewhere; and later that year, Equity Media Holdings entered Chapter 11 bankruptcy. On January 3, 2008, WMBQ-CA went dark, reportedly as a result of moving to a new transmitter site.

In mid-2011, Renard sold WMBQ for $5,250,000 to Prime Time Partners LLC, whose main principals are Jose Rodríguez and Marisol Messir.

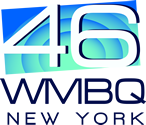
Former logo as WMBQ-CD

The call sign was changed to WMBQ-CD on April 23, 2012, when the station completed its digital transition. Long-form infomercial programming was added full-time; however, later that year, Canal SOI was added after having been removed from WNJU-DT3, which had aired it for a year. The SOI programming ended in 2013, and infomercial programming was once again added back to the subchannel, with just one local program airing, the morning show Al Día. This format continued through late December; Biz TV was then added, making WMBQ-CD the first station to air financial programming in the New York City TV market since WBIS aired financial programming from 1996 to 1998.

=== Spectrum sale and donation to WNET ===
In the Federal Communications Commission (FCC)'s incentive auction, WMBQ-CD sold its spectrum for $28,313,224 and indicated that it would enter into a post-auction channel sharing agreement. On September 29, 2017, the station entered into a channel sharing agreement with WNET (channel 13); concurrently, Prime Time Partners agreed to donate the WMBQ license to WNET. The donation was completed on December 22, 2017; the next day, WMBQ-CD was taken off-the-air while WNET prepared to move the shared transmitter to One World Trade Center. The station returned to the air in November 2018 as an affiliate of MHz Worldview. After MHz Networks announced in January that MHz Worldview would cease operations by March 1, 2020, in favor of digital streaming, WNET switched its programming to First Nations Experience.

== Subchannel ==
WMBQ-CD transmits one channel on the multiplex shared with WLIW:

Subchannels of WLIW and WMBQ-CD (ATSC 3.0)
License	Subchannel	Res.	Short name	Programming
WLIW	2.1	1080p	WCBS-HD	CBS (WCBS-TV)
WLIW	4.1	1080p	WNBC-HD	NBC (WNBC)
WLIW	13.1	1080p	WNET-HD	PBS (WNET)
WLIW	21.1	1080p	WLIW-HD	PBS
WLIW	47.1	1080p	WNJU-HD	Telemundo (WNJU)
WMBQ-CD	46.1	480i	WMBQ-CD	First Nations Experience

Subchannel broadcast with digital rights management

A third subchannel, EEE, a Spanish-language religious network, was added in 2014 but with low audio levels. In January 2015, EEE was replaced with long-form infomercial programming. Biz TV was previously on WMBQ's primary channel 46.1 until it was donated to WNET.
