= Jeju Munhwa Broadcasting Corporation =

South Korean radio and television station

The Jeju Munhwa Broadcasting Corporation (Korean: 제주문화방송) is MBC's local branch for Jeju Province. It is the oldest commercial media outlet in the island and uses the HLAJ calls.

== History ==
The station started broadcasting as Namyang Broadcasting on 14 September 1968. TV broadcasts (HLAJ-TV, output 2kW visual and 400W aural) started on 1 August 1970 on VHF channel 11, enabling all of the island of Jeju to receive television signals. For this occasion, the main MBC station in Seoul prepared a special program. The Korean government approved the influx of foreign capital to provide the television station with basic equipment.

In October 1971, NBS was renamed Namyang Munhwa Broadcasting and in January 1984, Jeju Munhwa Broadcasting.

The station moved to its current branch in March 1980 in Yeondong. In October 1981, it started color television broadcasts, ten months after the mainland. A relay station in Seogwipo was set up in December 1983 on channel 11. FM broadcasts started on 14 December 1983. Founder and president (since 1982) Park Tae-hoon died on 1 April 1984 at the age of 70.

Digital broadcasts started in 2005, receiving a T-DMB permit in November 2006.

In 2021, Jeju MBC was one of the fourteen loss-making operations, with the local station losing 1.2 billion won.
