= WEEG =

East Hampton, New York; United States
- Broadcast area: Eastern Long Island
- Frequency: 90.7 MHz

Programming
- Format: Community radio

Ownership
- Owner: Hamptons Community Radio Corporation

History
- First air date: May 2010
- Last air date: October 1, 2011
- Former call signs: WEER (2008–2011); WPKM (2011)

Technical information
- Licensing authority: FCC
- Facility ID: 173471
- Class: A
- ERP: 3,800 watts
- HAAT: 87 meters (285 ft)

Links
- Public license information: Public file; LMS

WEEG (90.7 FM) was a radio station serving the eastern Long Island area from May 2010 until October 2011. It broadcast on FM frequency 90.7 MHz and was under ownership of the Hamptons Community Radio Corporation. This station was operated under a construction permit with program test authority as their radio station facility was built.

Hamptons Community Radio Corporation had a license to simulcast from Westhampton, New York (89.1 FM), with the assigned call sign WEEW. They also had a license to operate on 90.7 FM in East Hampton however it did not have a tower and was required to get tower access by October 2011 or lose the license for the frequency. It ceased operations at 8 a.m. on October 1, 2011. To operate on the 90.7 frequency it would have shared it with WEGB. The shared time agreement called for WEEG to take about 9 hours every weekday and all of Saturday while WEGB got most of the weekdays plus all of Sunday. Both these stations operated with a directional pattern to protect New York City's WFUV, also operating on 90.7 MHz.

== History ==
This station received its original construction permit from the Federal Communications Commission (FCC) on October 21, 2008. This permit was scheduled to expire on October 21, 2011. The station was assigned the WEER call letters by the FCC on November 3, 2008.

Hamptons Community Radio Corporation (HCRC) was a non-profit 501(c)(3) organization governed by a five-member board of directors. It was also registered with the New York State Attorney General's office to accept donations.

In 2007 HCRC applied for three frequencies over which to broadcast: 90.7 in East Hampton, which the FCC approved subject to a time-sharing agreement with Community Bible Church, and 91.7 and/or 89.1 in the Riverhead area. In June 2010 the FCC approved 89.1 (licensed to Westhampton), which specified the station must be constructed by 2013. The callsign assigned was WEEW. The 91.7 frequency was granted to another applicant, and HCRC chose not to pursue an appeal of the FCC's decision.

Thus the station had two full-time frequencies (88.7 and 89.1, and a shared-time station 90.7), However, all the stations were identified as WEER East End Radio, except for the hourly legal IDs. As a community radio station, the entity relied heavily on local volunteers.

The station was conceived at a time when Long Island University was reported to be looking to sell its National Public Radio affiliated station WLIU (now WLIW-FM) in Southampton. That station became locally owned in December 2010 giving the Hamptons at the time two nonprofit radio stations that competed for the same money base.

WEER came on the air over Memorial Day weekend in May 2010. It took over the repeater signal of WPKN paying it $60,000 for the signal and assuming the $4,000 per month tower rental. The station's plans to broadcast from studios in Bridgehampton, New York, were delayed because dry rot was discovered in its planned facility. It went on the air broadcasting from Southold, with plans to return its studio to the South Fork by the end of summer 2010.

The founder was Barbara Barri, a former announcer for KZLA (now KLLI) in Los Angeles, California. Barri continued as president, executive director, station manager, program and news director, music director, and a member of the board. Peter Mundo was sports director, and also doubled as director of marketing.

On June 16, 2011, the station had its call sign changed to "WPKM" then again on June 23, 2011, to "WEEG". The station closed at 8 a.m., October 1, 2011. After the construction permit was allowed to expire, the station was deleted from the FCC's database on October 24, 2011.
