= WNET =

Television station in Newark, New Jersey

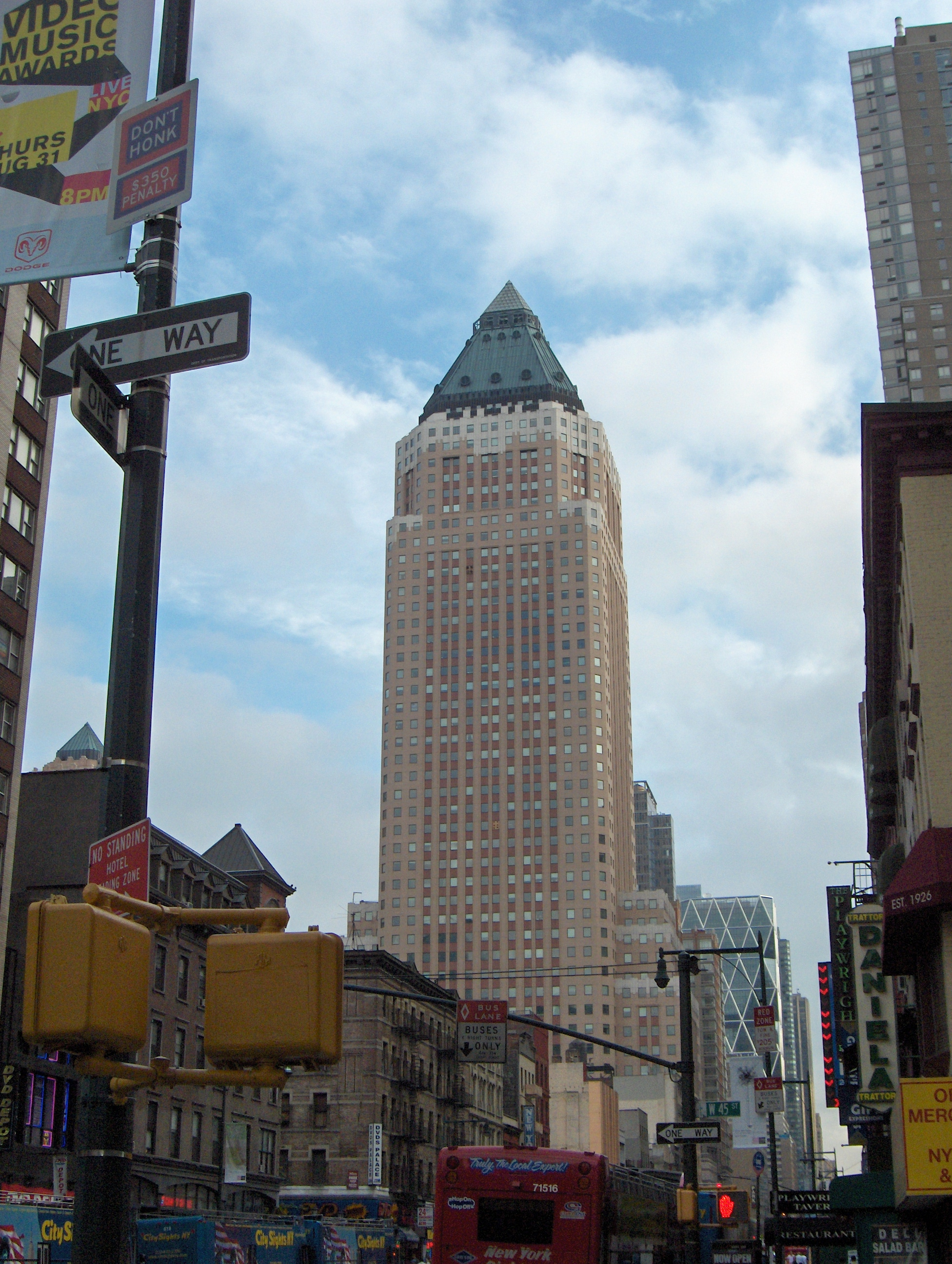
- WNET's studio, One Worldwide Plaza
- Newark, New Jersey; New York, New York; United States
- City: Newark, New Jersey
- Channels: Digital: 12 (VHF), shared with WNDT-CD; Virtual: 13
- Branding: THIRTEEN

Programming
- Affiliations: 13.1: PBS; 13.2: PBS Kids; 13.3: World Channel

Ownership
- Owner: The WNET Group; (WNET)
- Sister stations: WEER; WLIW; WLIW-FM; WMBQ-CD; WNDT-CD

History
- First air date: May 15, 1948
- Former call signs: WATV (1948–1958); WNTA-TV (1958–1962); WNDT (1962–1970)
- Former channel numbers: Analog: 13 (VHF, 1948–2009); Digital: 61 (UHF, 1998–2009); 13 (VHF, 2009–2020)
- Former affiliations: Independent (1948–1956; 1961–1962); NTA Film Network (1956–1961); NET (1962–1970)
- Call sign meaning: National Educational Television (forerunner of PBS)

Technical information
- Licensing authority: FCC
- Facility ID: 18795
- ERP: 6.5 kW
- HAAT: 507.8 m (1,666 ft)
- Transmitter coordinates: 40°42′46.8″N 74°0′47.3″W

Links
- Public license information: Public file; LMS
- Website: www.thirteen.org (station); www.wnet.org (corporate)

WNET (channel 13), branded on-air as Thirteen (stylized in all caps as THIRTEEN), is a primary PBS member television station licensed to Newark, New Jersey, United States, serving the New York City area. Owned by The WNET Group (formerly known as the Educational Broadcasting Corporation and later as WNET.org), it is a sister station to the area's secondary PBS member, Garden City, New York–licensed WLIW (channel 21), NPR member WLIW-FM (88.3) in Southampton, and two class A stations: WMBQ-CD (channel 46), and WNDT-CD (channel 14, which shares spectrum with WNET).

WNET and WLIW share studios at One Worldwide Plaza in Midtown Manhattan with an auxiliary street-level studio in the Lincoln Center complex on Manhattan's Upper West Side; WNET's transmitter is located at One World Trade Center.

== History ==
=== Independent station (1948–1962) ===
WNET commenced broadcasting on May 15, 1948, from a transmitter located atop First Mountain in West Orange, New Jersey, as WATV, a commercial television station owned by Atlantic Television, a subsidiary of Bremer Broadcasting Corporation. Frank V. Bremer, the CEO, also owned two North Jersey radio stations, WAAT (970 AM) and WAAT-FM (94.7 MHz). The three stations were based in the Mosque Theatre at 1020 Broad Street in Newark. WATV was the first of three new stations in the New York City television market to sign on the air during 1948, and was also the first independent station. One unusual daytime program, Daywatch, consisted of a camera focused on a teletypewriter printing wire service news stories, interspersed with cutaways to mechanical toys against a light music soundtrack. Another early series by the station was Stairway to Stardom (1950–1951), one of the first TV series with an African-American host. WATV's transmitter was moved to the Empire State Building in November 1953.

On October 6, 1957, Bremer Broadcasting announced it had sold its stations for $3.5 million to National Telefilm Associates (NTA), an early distributor of motion pictures for television, joining its NTA Film Network. On May 7, 1958, channel 13's call sign was changed to WNTA-TV to reflect the new ownership; the radio stations also adopted these call letters. NTA's cash resources enabled WNTA to produce a schedule of programming with greater emphasis on the people and events of New Jersey, compared to the other commercial television stations. NTA also sought to make channel 13 the center of a new commercial network, though during its run the NTA Film Network offered only one night of "in-pattern" network programming, Friday nights in 1957–58, and for most purposes WNTA served as the New York showcase for nationally syndicated programming and produced several such entries, notably the anthology drama series Play of the Week; the talk show Open End, hosted by David Susskind; children's show The Magic Clown; and a popular dance program emceed by Clay Cole. The station continued to lag behind New York's other independent stations—WNEW-TV (channel 5), WOR-TV (channel 9) and WPIX (channel 11)—in terms of audience size, and NTA incurred a large debt load. National Telefilm Associates put the WNTA stations up for sale in February 1961.

==== Transition (1961–1962) ====
At least three prospective purchasers expressed interest in WNTA. The most prominent was the New York City-based group Educational Television for the Metropolitan Area (ETMA), a consortium of businesspeople, cultural leaders and educators who intended to turn channel 13 into New York City's educational station. By this time, it was obvious that the non-commercial frequency that the Federal Communications Commission (FCC) originally allocated to the city, UHF channel 25, would not be nearly adequate enough to cover a market that stretched from Fairfield County, Connecticut, in the north to Ocean County, New Jersey, in the south. Prior to 1964, when the FCC required television manufacturers to include UHF tuners in newer sets as per the All-Channel Receiver Act passed in 1961, most viewers could not view UHF stations except with an expensive converter; only a few manufacturers made sets with built-in UHF tuning. Even for those who could access UHF stations, reception was marginal even under the best conditions.

With assistance from the University of the State of New York, ETMA had attempted to purchase channel 13 and convert it into a non-commercial station in 1957, when Bremer Broadcasting first put the station on the block; this bid was later withdrawn. This time ETMA was competing with NTA founding president Ely Landau, who had formed a syndicate to buy the station after resigning from NTA; and David Susskind, who received financial backing from Paramount Pictures.

ETMA's initial bid of $4 million was rejected by NTA, but the citizens' group remained persistent. With the support and guidance of National Educational Television (NET), ETMA later received an endorsement from newly appointed FCC chairman Newton N. Minow, who established public hearings to discuss the fate of channel 13. The pendulum quickly shifted in favor of channel 13 going non-commercial, and the commercial suitors withdrew their interest.

On June 29, 1961, ETMA agreed to purchase WNTA for $6.2 million. About $2 million of that amount came from five of the city's six remaining commercial VHF stations (WPIX was the lone holdout), all of whom were pleased to see a competitor eliminated. In addition, CBS later donated a facility in Manhattan to ETMA and NET to use as a studio. The FCC approved the transfer in October, and converted channel 13's commercial license to non-commercial.

The outgoing New Jersey governor, Robert B. Meyner, addressing state lawmakers' concerns over continued programming specific to New Jersey, and fearing the FCC would move the channel 13 allocation to New York City, petitioned the United States courts of appeals on September 6, 1961, to block the sale of WNTA-TV. The court ruled in the state's favor two months later.

The unsettled deal almost caused National Telefilm Associates to reconsider its decision to sell the station altogether, and NTA made plans to go forward: WNTA-TV made a play to acquire broadcast rights for the New York Mets baseball team for its inaugural 1962 season. Faced with either consummating the transaction or seeing it canceled, ETMA settled their differences with New Jersey officials on December 4, 1961. After a few last-minute issues arose to cause further delays, the transfer became final on December 22. Later that evening, WNTA-TV signed off for the final time. ETMA and NET then went to work converting the station, which they said would return with its new educational format within three months.

"Tonight, you join me in being present at the birth of a great adventure." Edward R. Murrow, on the first broadcast of WNDT on September 16, 1962.

Ten months later, channel 13 was ready to be reborn under new call letters, WNDT (for "New Dimensions in Television"). With Edward R. Murrow—then director of the United States Information Agency—as host of the maiden broadcast, ETMA—now the Educational Broadcasting Corporation—flipped the switch on September 16, 1962. The return of channel 13 as WNDT gave the New York City market its first educational station, and with a dial position on the coveted VHF band (in many other cities, including large ones, educational stations had to make do with UHF frequencies). New York's non-commercial UHF channel, on the other hand, signed on as WNYE-TV four-and-a-half years later in April 1967. Richard Heffner was appointed as WNDT's first general manager, serving in that position in its first year; Heffner continued to appear on channel 13 as producer and host of the public affairs program The Open Mind until his death in December 2013.

=== Educational/public television station (1962–present) ===
During the transition, and after the inaugural broadcast, WNDT faced an immediate crisis. The American Federation of Television and Radio Artists (AFTRA) was concerned about the use of teachers—some of whom were union-certified performers—on non-commercial television, and how they would be compensated should their work be distributed nationally.

AFTRA called a strike on the morning of WNDT's debut. Engineers and technicians who were members of the International Brotherhood of Electrical Workers (IBEW) refused to cross the AFTRA picket line, leaving the station's management and other non-union employees to produce the three-hour inaugural broadcast. Immediately afterwards, channel 13 went off the air again, as the strike continued for nearly two weeks. The striking workers returned WNDT to the air after ten days and on September 28, the labor dispute was settled. However, the station's financial resources were drained, requiring an infusion of cash from the Ford Foundation to help keep the station running.

NET originally wanted to merge its operations with WNDT, which would have given the station a direct line of funding as well as make channel 13 NET's flagship station. The Ford Foundation, which supported both groups, stopped the proposed mergers on at least two different occasions in 1962 and 1965.

Events that began in 1967 led the Ford Foundation to change its stance and push for a WNDT-NET merger. The newly formed Corporation for Public Broadcasting (CPB) (created by an act of the United States Congress) initially supported NET's network role, while providing government funding for programming. But that move was followed two years later by the establishment of the Public Broadcasting Service as the CPB's own distribution system—which was a direct threat to NET's territory. It has been intimated that the CPB's creation was an attempt to curb NET's production of controversial documentaries and replace it with a less controversial, government-friendly broadcaster, less hostile in particular to the Johnson, and later the Nixon administrations (NET ignored the demand and continued with the production of the critically acclaimed documentaries). At one point, President Nixon, frustrated with NET's documentaries criticizing his administration, especially its handling of the Vietnam War, almost managed to cut NET's $20 million funding grant in half. This led both the Ford Foundation and the CPB to threaten NET with funding withdrawal in early 1970, unless it merged its operations with WNDT. Not long after, the Ford Foundation brokered the merger of WNDT and NET, which took effect on June 29, 1970. Channel 13's call sign was changed to the present WNET on October 1, 1970. NET ceased network operations three days later, with PBS taking over the following day. The station continued to produce some shows for the national PBS schedule with the NET branding until early 1972, when they began to be identified as "WNET/13" programs; a formal consolidation of the corporation's separate national and local production facilities occurred later that year.

Following the merger, David Loxton established the TV Lab in 1972 with support from the Rockefeller Foundation and New York State Council on the Arts. TV Lab provided artists with equipment to produce video pieces through an artist-in-residence program. The Independent Documentary Fund and Video Tape Review series were both produces of TV Lab. TV Lab ended in 1984 when the CPB withdrew funds.

Since 1979, the station has been known on-air as "Thirteen". It continued to include Newark in its legal IDs (though logos for national productions read "New York") until the late 1990s. Since then, it has identified mostly as "New York", though it is still legally licensed to Newark.

Even after becoming a noncommercial station, channel 13 retained its original studios and offices at the Mosque Theater in Newark. The station eventually moved to the Gateway Center office building, also in Newark. In 1982, more than 20 years after becoming the New York area's flagship public television station, WNET moved its operations to the Hudson Hotel at 237 West 58th Street in Manhattan, while retaining the Gateway Center studios for a few more years.

In 1987, channel 13 celebrated its silver anniversary with a series of rebroadcasts of older programs titled Thirteen Revisited.

In 1998, WNET moved to 450 West 33rd Street, straddling the railroad tracks going into Pennsylvania Station.

Channel 13's transmitter facilities, including a newly installed digital transmission system, were destroyed in the terrorist attacks of September 11, 2001. Gerard (Rod) Coppola, channel 13's head transmitter engineer, was among those who died when the north tower collapsed. His remains were discovered on December 25, 2001. For the next ten months, WNYE-TV, headquartered in Brooklyn, became WNET's surrogate transmitter and airwave: for those without cable, repeats of WNET's prime time schedule were broadcast on WNYE until Channel 13 could re-establish transmission facilities back at the Empire State Building.

Some time later, in February 2003, WNET completed its merger with Long Island PBS broadcaster WLIW (licensed to Garden City and based in Plainview), combining the two stations into one operation. While most of the two stations' operations have been merged, they still have separate studio facilities, separate governing boards, and conduct separate fundraising efforts.

During 2009, WNET's parent company, WNET.org, sustained financial difficulties, and in January, the company pared its workforce from 500 employees to 415, due to severe problems with its budget and fundraising. In October, WNET announced that its studios at 450 West 33rd Street would soon be up for sale, as it no longer needed the extra space. In November, WNET announced that all WNET.org employees would take an unpaid furlough for three to five days between Christmas and New Year's Day, with a skeleton crew of engineers remaining during that time to keep the stations on the air; however, they, too, would have to go on furloughs at the start of 2010. In 2011, WNET moved its studios and offices to Worldwide Plaza.

WNET has been broadcasting digital-only since June 12, 2009.

On July 1, 2011, WNET took over the programming of New Jersey Network's television stations, which were relaunched as NJTV (now NJ PBS). The network features increased coverage of news and issues pertinent to New Jersey, as well as programming from the WNET and PBS libraries. The transfer of programming to WNET was part of Governor Chris Christie's plan for the New Jersey government's exit from public broadcasting. As part of the deal, WNET airs NJTV's nightly statewide newscast, NJ Today (which was renamed NJTV News on November 4, 2013), to meet its local programming obligations since it still operates on a frequency allocated to Newark. Previously, it had aired NJN's newscast, NJN News, which it co-produced with NJN from 1978 to 1981 (the program continued to air on WNET even after NJN took full control over its production).

In 2014, the Tisch WNET Studios at Lincoln Center were built at the southwest corner of 66th Street and Broadway; this facility houses two television studios. The space can also accommodate lectures, screenings and concerts. The facility is named in honor of James S. Tisch and his wife, Merryl H. Tisch, whose $15 million gift was, at that time, the single largest donation from individuals in WNET's history.

On May 9, 2017, it was announced that WNET would resume broadcasting from Lower Manhattan at One World Trade Center by the end of the year.

In 2019, WNET acquired New Jersey news website NJ Spotlight. The following year, it merged NJ Spotlight with NJTV's newsroom, with the NJTV newscasts becoming NJ Spotlight News. NJ Spotlight would merge with NJTV News in 2020. On March 25, 2021, WNET.org was reorganized as The WNET Group.

On July 2, 2020, at 9 a.m. during the FCC repack, WNET relocated from channel 13 to channel 12.

On April 23, 2025, NJ PBS announced that it would shut down in June 2026, after failing to reach an agreement with New Jersey's Public Broadcasting Authority to continue operating the network. Additionally, the federal government cut over $1 billion in funds to CPB. NJ PBS closed its Newark broadcast studio in May 2026, with its last news broadcasts being done remotely through September 2026. On June 3, 2026, New Jersey state treasurer Aaron Binder announced that Montclair State University would take over NJ PBS's operations on July 1.

== Original productions ==
=== Notable general-audience programs produced by WNET ===
WNET has produced, created and/or presented a number of PBS shows. This includes, but is not limited to:

- Africa (2001)
- The African-American Journey (2002–2005)
- Aging Out (2005)
- Amato: A Love Affair with Opera (2001)
- Amanpour & Company (2018–present)
- American Masters (1983–present)
- Assignment America (1974–1975)
- Australia: Beyond the Fatal Shore (2000)
- Bill Moyers Reports: Earth On Edge (2001)
- Black Journal
- Center of the Storm (2002)
- Changing Stages (2001)
- Charlie Rose (1991–2017)
- Chasing the Dream (2014–present)
- Colonial House (2004)
- Cucina Amore (1999–2002)
- Dickens (2003)
- DNA (2003)
- Echoes From the White House (2001)
- EGG, the Arts Show (2000–2003)
- Extreme Oil (2004)
- Firing Line (2018–present)
- Freedom: A History of Us (2003)
- Frontier House (2002)
- The Great American Dream Machine (1971–1972)
- Great Food (2001)
- Great Performances (1972–present)
- Heroes of Ground Zero (2002)
- In Search of Ancient Ireland (2002)
- Innovation: Life, Inspired (2004)
- Justice and the Generals (2002)
- Live from Lincoln Center (1976–present)
- Local News (2001)
- Lord of the Universe
- MasterChef USA (2000–2001)
- The Mind
- Monarchy
- Moyers on Addiction: Close to Home (1998)
- Nature (1982–present)
- New York: A Documentary Film (1999–2003; co-produced with WGBH-TV)
- NET Opera Theater (1967-1974)
- NOW (2002–2010)
- NYC-ARTS (2012; formerly known as Sunday Arts)
- On Our Own Terms: Moyers on Dying (2000)
- The Open Mind (1956–present)
- Our Genes Our Choices (2003)
- PBS NewsHour (weekday editions, 1975–1995; weekend editions, 2013–2022)
- Reagan Needs Help (1979–present)
- Realidades (1975–1977)
- Red Gold: The Epic Story of Blood (2002)
- Religion & Ethics Newsweekly (1997–2017)
- Reel New York
- The Rise and Fall of Jim Crow (2002)
- Savage Earth (1998)
- Savage Seas (1999; co-produced with Granada Television)
- The Secret Life of the Brain (2002)
- Secrets of the Dead (2000–present)
- Simon Schama's Power of Art (Schama hosted The Story of the Jews and A History of Britain with the BBC)
- The Six Wives of Henry VIII (TV series) (2003)
- Slavery and the Making of America (2004)
- Sound and Fury (2000)
- Soul! (1968–1973)
- Srebrenica: A Cry from the Grave (1999)
- Stage on Screen (2001)
- The Story of English
- Sunday Arts
- Tavis Smiley (2004–2017)
- Taxi Dreams (2001)
- That Money Show (2000–2001)
- Thomas Hampson: I Hear America Singing (1997)
- Verna: U.S.O. Girl
- The A Walk Through... series of historical walking tours of New York City: A Walk Through Central Park, A Walk Through Greenwich Village, A Walk Through the Bronx, A Walk Through Brooklyn, A Walk Through Queens, and A Walk Through Staten Island
- Warrior Challenge (2003)
- Who Cares: Chronic Illness in America (2001)
- Who's Dancin' Now? (2001)
- Wide Angle (2002–2009)
- Wild TV (2002)
- Woman Alive! (1974–1977)
- Worldfocus (2008–2010)

=== Notable children's programs produced by WNET ===
- Angelina Ballerina* (2002–2003; produced with HIT Entertainment)
  - Angelina Ballerina: The Next Steps (2009–2011; produced with HIT Entertainment)
- Barney & Friends* (1992–2010; produced with HIT Entertainment)
- Bob the Builder* (2005–2018; produced with HIT Entertainment)
- Cyberchase (2002–present; produced with Nelvana seasons 1–5, season 4 with Flying Minds Entertainment, seasons 6–present with PiP Animation Services and Title Entertainment)
- Franny's Feet (2004–2011; produced with Decode Entertainment and C.O.R.E. Toons for season 3)
- Jakers! The Adventures of Piggley Winks (2003–2007; produced with Mike Young Productions, Crest Communications, and Entara Ltd.)
- Shining Time Station (1989–1993)
- Space Racers** (2014–2018; produced with Stardust Animation)
- Thomas & Friends* (2004–2017; produced with HiT Entertainment)

*indicates a program that was originally presented by Connecticut Public Television.
**indicates a program that was originally presented by Maryland Public Television.

Reruns of Wishbone were also presented by WNET in 2009.

WNET has also produced programming for public television stations distributed outside of the PBS system, including:

- Camp TV (2020–present)
- In the Mix: The New Normal, a co-production with In the Mix
- Let's Learn (2020–present)
- Planet H2O
- What's Up in Factories
- What's Up in Finance
- What's Up in Technology

=== Other programming ===
WNET was also one of the original co-producing entities of the PBS NewsHour, along with Washington, D.C. PBS member station WETA-TV and MacNeil-Lehrer Productions. The show debuted in 1975 as a local news-analysis program, The Robert MacNeil Report. Jim Lehrer, a frequent guest on MacNeil's show, became co-host the following year, when the show was picked up by other PBS stations. WNET produced weekend editions of PBS NewsHour alongside WETA-TV for the weekday editions until 2022 when WETA assumed production for the weekend edition in addition to the weekday editions.

== Criticisms and controversies ==
=== Misuse of federal grants ===
In 2010, the office of the United States Attorney for the Southern District of New York, filed a lawsuit asserting that the WNET subsidiary, the Educational Broadcasting Corporation, misused grant money worth $13 million, donated by the National Science Foundation, the National Endowment for the Humanities and the National Endowment for the Arts between September 2001 and January 2008. The suit asserted that WNET had used grant money that was given for the production of programs including American Masters, Great Performances and Cyberchase for other purposes. WNET settled the lawsuit in June 2010 by paying back the United States government $950,000, pledging to instate a program to ensure they honored all future federal grant requirements and agreeing to not receive $1,015,046 in federal grant money that was about to be awarded, WNET Vice President and General Counsel, Robert Feinberg, said to The New York Times: "This is not a scenario we want to repeat and we have no intention of repeating it."

=== Board member influence on programming ===
In November 2012, WNET was scheduled to air Alex Gibney's film Park Avenue: Money, Power and the American Dream produced by Independent Lens. The film compared the wealth gap between the New York residents of Park Avenue in the Bronx and the wealthy residents of an exclusive Manhattan apartment block at 740 Park Avenue, including David Koch, a billionaire businessman and political activist. At the time Koch was a board member of WNET and was planning on making "a seven-figure donation—maybe more" to WNET. A furor erupted when The New Yorker revealed in May 2013 that to appease Koch, the president of WNET, Neal Shapiro, called Koch offering him the opportunity to screen Gibney's film before broadcast and rebut it after it aired with a written statement. Shapiro said to The New Yorker that he "just called David Koch. He's on our board. He's the biggest main character. No one else, just David Koch. Because he's a trustee. It's a courtesy. I can't remember doing anything like this [before]". WNET replaced the film's introduction by Stanley Tucci with a new introduction calling the film "controversial" and "provocative". Immediately after the broadcast, they aired a statement from Koch Industries criticizing the film as "disappointing and divisive", although a Koch spokesperson said David Koch had only watched the trailer. WNET followed the statement with an on-air round-table discussion where the moderator repeatedly mentioned that Koch's philanthropic contributions totaled a billion dollars. Gibney was not invited to appear at the round-table and was quoted as saying, "Why is WNET offering Mr. Koch special favors? And why did the station allow Koch to offer a critique of a film he hadn't even seen? Money. Money talks. They tried to undercut the credibility of the film, and I had no opportunity to defend it." Koch did not make the large donation to WNET and resigned from their board on May 16, 2013.

=== Ethical issues with funding ===
In September 2013, WNET launched a series called The Pension Peril, examining the economic sustainability of public pensions and promoting cuts to their funding. On December 18, 2013, Neal Shapiro, president and CEO of WNET was quoted in a press release saying "this is the type of complex public policy story that only public television covers in an in-depth and ongoing way. WNET is poised to lead and further the dialogue about this challenging situation all across public media, on PBS, public radio, and online".

On February 12, 2014, PandoDaily reported that the sole sponsor of The Pension Peril was former Enron trader John D. Arnold who had financially backed efforts to cut public employee pension benefits. Stephen Segaller, WNET's vice president for programming told The New York Times on February 13, 2014, that he had "absolute conviction" that the Laura and John Arnold Foundation was an admissible funder and the funding did not violate PBS' "perception" rule. On February 14, Segaller told The New York Times that WNET had reversed course after discussing with PBS "both the facts and the optics. We all take very, very seriously any suggestion that there's a perception problem about the integrity of our work or the sources of our funding, and we came to the conclusion that it's better to err on the side of caution". WNET and PBS issued a joint statement saying the series would go on hiatus and WNET would return the $3.5 million grant it had received from the Laura and John Arnold Foundation. Segaller said in the statement, "We made a mistake, pure and simple". PBS ombudsman, Michael Getler, commented that PandoDaily's article "shines a light, once again, on what seems to me to be ethical compromises in funding arrangements and lack of real transparency for viewers caused, in part, by the complicated funding demands needed to support public broadcasting, and in part by managers who make some questionable decisions".

Getler added that WNET "went seriously wrong" and that their "decision to accept a grant of $3.5 million from the Arnold Foundation, with a stated interest in 'public employee benefits reform', flunks PBS's own 'perception test', which is part of the service's Funding Standards and Practices."

=== Neglecting public mission and mandate ===
In late 2014, WNET programming chief Stephen Segaller received widespread criticism for proposing to push the multi award-winning documentary strands Independent Lens and POV out of a prime time slot and onto a secondary station, WLIW (Channel 21). Over 2,000 documentarians signed a petition, stating that WNET's action would lead to the shows being marginalized by PBS affiliates nationwide and have a severe effect on cutting edge documentary filmmaking. Among the prominent opponents of rescheduling POV and Independent Lens were filmmakers Alex Gibney and Laura Poitras, who had campaigned against a similar move by WNET in 2012. TV producer Norman Lear wrote an op-ed in The New York Times accusing WNET and PBS of a ratings-chase that "could devastate independent documentary film making". He criticized the broadcaster for "threatening, for the second time in four years, to downgrade documentaries, which are at the heart of its public mission." Many of the subjects POV and Independent Lens covered—like the Koch brothers' influence on American politics in Alex Gibney's film, Park Avenue: Money, Power and the American Dream—have been controversial, leading the Indie Caucus, a group of Independent filmmakers to speculate if the provocative subjects they explored might also be relegating them to the more obscure TV schedule. Segaller said it was "preposterous" to suggest that WNET had a censorship agenda when both programs had run for more than a decade. "One disputatious moment in a many-year history does not a conspiracy make," he declared. In April 2015, WNET relented and restored both strands to their original slots.

=== Inaccuracy and improper influence ===
In June 2015, a media furor forced WNET to postpone the third season of Finding Your Roots when the Sony Pictures hack revealed via hacked emails that a subject of the series, Ben Affleck, had lobbied for material relating to a relative owning slaves be removed from the show. Those edits, which violated PBS ethics standards, brought strong criticism from the media to WNET and the producers of the show. PBS issued a statement saying "the series co-producers violated PBS standards by failing to shield the creative and editorial process from improper influence, and by failing to inform PBS or WNET of Mr. Affleck's efforts to affect program content". The statement promised the episode would be withdrawn from distribution and that the series would employ "an independent genealogist to review all versions of program episodes for factual accuracy". After the suspension of the series, Adweek commented: "The network clearly understands that its integrity has been thrown into question by this controversy. Even if they understood where the producers of the show were coming from when they decided to entertain the request, PBS and the veracity of all that's included in their documentaries, requires decisive action that conveys just how serious this infraction was". The series returned to the air in January 2016.

=== LGBTQ+ content ===
In March 2025, WNET came under fire by Republican members of Congress during the Anti-American Airwaves hearing, which saw the station accused of using public funding to push "radical, left positions". Following these hearings, the station scrubbed its archives of three episodes of the educational program Let's Learn—two of which featured a children's book with a transgender protagonist, while the third featured a drag queen.

== Subchannels ==
The station's signal is multiplexed:

Subchannels of WNET and WNDT-CD
License	Subchannel	Res.	Short name	Programming
WNET	13.1	1080i	WNET-HD	PBS
WNET	13.2	480i	KIDS	PBS Kids
WNET	13.3	480i	World	World
WNET	21.1	1080i	WLIW-HD	PBS (WLIW)
WNET	21.3	480i	NHK	NHK World (WLIW)
WNET	21.4	1080i	AllArts	All Arts (WLIW)
WNDT-CD	14.1	480i	WNDT-CD	First Nations Experience

Broadcast on behalf of another station

== See also ==
- Media of New York City
