= WEER (FM) =

Satellite of WLIW-FM, Southampton
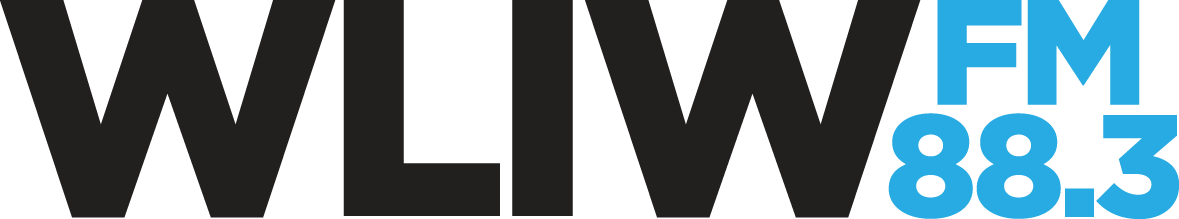
- Montauk, New York; United States
- Broadcast area: Eastern Long Island
- Frequency: 88.7 MHz
- Branding: 88.3 WLIW-FM

Programming
- Format: Public radio

Ownership
- Owner: The WNET Group; (WNET)
- Sister stations: WLIW; WLIW-FM; WMBQ-CD; WNDT-CD; WNET

History
- First air date: August 30, 2006
- Former call signs: WPKM (2004–2011)
- Call sign meaning: East End Radio

Technical information
- Licensing authority: FCC
- Facility ID: 91175
- Class: A
- ERP: 1,700 watts (vertical); 5 watts (horizontal)
- HAAT: 91 meters (299 ft)
- Transmitter coordinates: 41°1′55.4″N 71°58′31.3″W

Links
- Public license information: Public file; LMS
- Webcast: Listen live
- Website: www.wliw.org/radio/

WEER (88.7 FM) is an American radio station licensed to serve the community of Montauk, New York, since 2006. Owned by The WNET Group, it simulcasts WLIW-FM to Montauk and East Hampton, New York.

== History ==
This station received its original construction permit from the Federal Communications Commission on March 21, 2002. The new station, originally owned by WPKN, Inc. was assigned the WPKM call sign by the FCC on November 26, 2004. WPKM received its license to cover from the FCC on August 30, 2006, and began simulcasting WPKN, Bridgeport, Connecticut.

In October 2010, license holder WPKN, Inc., reached an agreement to sell this station to Hamptons Community Radio Corporation for $60,000. The deal was approved by the FCC on December 8, 2010, and the transaction was consummated on June 6, 2011. The station changed its call sign to WEER on June 16, 2011, with a call sign swap with the now-defunct WEEG.

=== Silence (2011–2013) ===
On October 1, 2011, WEER went silent for financial reasons and the licensee filed a request with the FCC for special temporary authority to remain silent. The Commission granted this authority on January 2, 2012, with a scheduled expiration of July 2, 2012. Just days before that deadline, a new application was filed and silent authority was extended through October 2, 2012. Under the terms of the Telecommunications Act of 1996, as a matter of law a radio station's broadcast license is subject to automatic forfeiture and cancellation if they fail to broadcast for one full year.

The station reported that it returned to normal broadcast operations on September 27, 2012. However, power loss and damage from Hurricane Sandy knocked the station off the air again on October 29, 2012. On January 29, 2013, the station was granted a new authority to remain silent with an expiration date on July 28, 2013.

=== On the air (2013–present) ===
In October 2013 the station was returned to the air, and sold to Eastern Tower Corporation. The sale was consummated on January 22, 2014. In February 2019, WEER began broadcasting a soft adult contemporary format with music from the 1960s through the 1980s.

On January 16, 2023, it was announced that The WNET Group would acquire WEER for $100,000, making it a sister to Long Island NPR member station WLIW-FM. The deal closed on October 10, 2023. On October 13, 2023, WEER filed a request with the FCC for special temporary authority to remain silent, while it processed the purchasing and installing of equipment, so that it could simulcast WLIW-FM.
