= MBC Chungbuk Cheongju Broadcasting Station =

South Korean radio and television station

The MBC Chungbuk Cheongju Broadcasting Station (Korean: MBC충북 청주방송국) is one of the two branches of MBC Chungbuk, a local branch created from the merger of the Cheongju and Chungju. The station's callsign is HLAX. It covers the central and southern parts of North Chungcheong Province, Sejong City and parts of Daejeon.

== History ==
In 1969, in response to local public opinion that a local cultural broadcasting station should be established, the May 16 Scholarship Association took the lead and established Chungcheong Broadcasting Co., Ltd. on 8 October 1970, and opened on 23 October the same year (radio station HLAX). In October 1971, the name was changed to Cheongju Munhwa Broadcasting. Until the 1980 Framework Act on Media, the station was entirely private.

On 1 April 1983, Cheongju MBC started broadcasting its television station with a special broadcast featuring more than 200 participants, including popular comedians and singers of the time.

In 2010, Kim Jae-cheol, who was the president of Cheongju MBC, was appointed the president of the parent station in Seoul.

On 24 August 2016, it was announced that the Cheongju and Chungju branches would merge to form a larger regional branch, MBC Chungbuk, effective 1 October. The merger was formally approved by the regulatory body. New facilities in Cheongju opened on 30 September 2016, ahead of the start of the new branch.

MBC Chungbuk announced the termination of its AM radio station in Cheongju (1332 kHz) on 1 April 2020, with the date set for 19 November 2021.
