= Wishbone =

Wishbone commonly refers to the furcula, a fork-shaped bone in some dinosaurs including all modern birds.

Wishbone, Wish Bone or Wish bone may also refer to:

== Arts and entertainment ==
=== Film and television ===
- Wishbone (TV series), an American children's program
- The Wishbone, a 1933 British comedy film
- G. W. Wishbone, a fictional character in the TV series Rawhide

=== Music ===
- Wish Bone, or Charles Scruggs, American rapper and member of Bone Thugs-n-Harmony
- Wishbone Ash, British rock band
- Wish Bone (album), by Oh Land
- Wishbone (album), by Conan Gray
- Wishbones, an album by David Knopfler
- "Wishbone", a song by Freya Ridings from You Mean the World to Me
- "Wishbone", a song by Dropbox from the album Dropbox

== Science and technology ==
- Wishbone (computer bus), an open source hardware computer bus
- Double wishbone suspension, an automotive design feature
- Wishbone boom, a type of boom used to control a sail on a windsurfing board

== Sports ==
- Wishbone formation, a type of offense in American football
- Wishbone, a submission hold and double-team attack in professional wrestling

== Other uses ==
- Wish-Bone, an American salad dressing and condiment brand
- Wishbone scarp, a Pacific Ocean floor feature in the oceanic crust
- Wishbone Ridge, a ridge associated with the Wishbone scarp or a ridge in the Duncan Mountains of Antarctica
