= WLIW-FM =

Public radio station in Southampton, New York

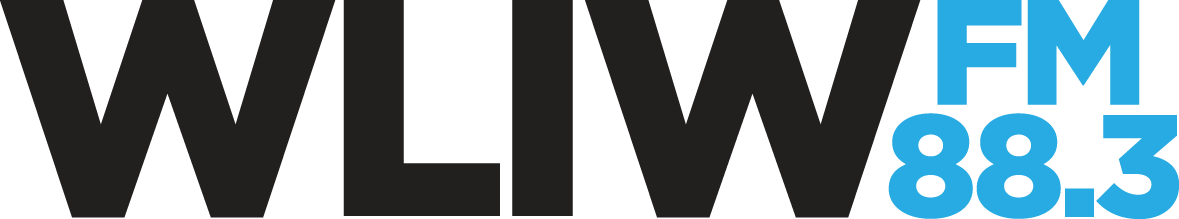
- Southampton, New York; United States
- Broadcast area: Eastern Long Island
- Frequency: 88.3 MHz (HD Radio)
- Branding: 88.3 WLIW-FM

Programming
- Format: Public radio
- Affiliations: American Public Media; NPR; Public Radio Exchange

Ownership
- Owner: The WNET Group; (WNET)
- Sister stations: WEER; WLIW; WMBQ-CD; WNDT-CD; WNET

History
- First air date: March 11, 1980
- Former call signs: WPBX (1980–2002); WLIU (2002–2010); WPPB (2010–2020)
- Former frequencies: 91.3 MHz (1980-1993)
- Call sign meaning: Long Island (taken from sister TV station)

Technical information
- Licensing authority: FCC
- Facility ID: 38340
- Class: B1
- ERP: 5,900 watts (horizontal); 25,000 watts (vertical)
- HAAT: 66 meters (217 ft)
- Transmitter coordinates: 40°53′17.3″N 72°26′41.3″W
- Translator: 96.9 W245BA (Manorville)
- Repeater: 88.7 WEER (Montauk)

Links
- Public license information: Public file; LMS
- Webcast: Listen live (via TuneIn)
- Website: www.wliw.org/radio/

WLIW-FM (88.3 FM) is a non-commercial, listener-supported radio station licensed to Southampton, New York, and serving eastern Long Island and coastal Connecticut. Owned by The WNET Group, it is a sister station to PBS members WLIW channel 21 and WNET channel 13. WLIW-FM features news and information programming weekday mornings and afternoons, with music programs middays, nights and weekends, some coming from NPR, American Public Media and Public Radio Exchange.

WLIW-FM has an effective radiated power (ERP) of 5,900 watts horizontal polarization and 25,000 watts vertical. Its transmitter is located on Stony Brook Southampton's campus. The station broadcasts using HD Radio technology. WLIW-FM is simulcast on co-owned 88.7 WEER in Montauk, and on FM translator W245BA at 96.9 in Manorville.

== Programming ==
WLIW-FM is the only NPR member station based on Long Island (population around 8 million). It is one of three public radio stations broadcasting to eastern Long Island. The others are based in Connecticut: WNPR, WSHU-FM and WSUF, which access the market via repeater stations.

On weekdays, two popular NPR news shows are carried: Morning Edition and All Things Considered. Late mornings, WLIW-FM produces Long Island Daily with Michael Mackey and Heart of the East End with Gianna Volpe. The Capitol Pressroom is recorded in Albany, and supplied by WCNY-FM.

Musical genres include jazz, rhythm and blues, adult album alternative, folk music, world music and Broadway showtunes. WLIW-FM originates several music shows, including The Afternoon Ramble with Brian Cosgrove and The Urban Jazz Experience with Ed German.

== History ==
=== Southampton College (1978–2010) ===
The original station was a carrier current station, WSCR, housed in a Southampton College dormitory suite, and run as a student club. Construction of a new stereo FM station began in the basement of Southampton Hall by 1978. The antenna tower was raised in January 1980, and the station went on the air, still as a club and funded by student activity fees, as WPBX at 91.3 MHz on March 11, 1980. The original power output of the FM transmitter was ten watts.

WPBX was completely student-run, with freeform programming, and largely ignored by the administration, until 1981-82 when the administration imposed some control and installed Joseph Valerio to run the station. Valerio arranged to carry Texaco's Metropolitan Opera radio broadcasts and programming began evolving toward an NPR-style format. In February 2002, the station changed to a jazz format. On July 6, 2002, the station changed its call sign to WLIU, reflecting its ownership by Long Island University (LIU). In April 2004, the station changed to a news format.

=== Peconic Public Broadcasting (2010–2020) ===
The station broadcast from the second floor of Chancellors Hall on the campus of Stony Brook Southampton until the spring of 2010. The State University of New York at Stony Brook had taken over the LIU campus (previously named Southampton College) in 2006. At the time of the takeover, an agreement was made to permit the station to continue to broadcast from the school through 2009 and that it could continue to use the tower on the campus through 2024.

The transfer of ownership of the station from Long Island University to Peconic Public Broadcasting was completed on December 15, 2010, and the call-letters changed to WPPB to reflect this. The studios were moved to Hill St. in Southampton village after Peconic Public Broadcasting took ownership.

The acquisition was led by Wallace A. "Wally" Smith who was station manager of WLIU. Smith was station manager of KUSC when it converted from an all rock station to a classical music station in Los Angeles, and was president of that radio station until 1996 (Smith's wife Bonnie Grice was an on air announcer at both KUSC and WPPB. She left WPPB for Sag Harbor radio station WLNG shortly before the announcement of the sale to WNET). The grassroots effort had included Alec Baldwin, Joy Behar and Jann Wenner. The package for the acquisition was $2.7 million ($1.35 million in cash; picking up $400,000 in transition operating costs; and maintaining WCWP radio station for one year at LIU's parent C.W. Post campus—estimated at $1 million).

=== The WNET Group (2020–present) ===
On October 24, 2019, it was announced that WNET would acquire WPPB for nearly $1 million, making it a sister to its Long Island PBS member station WLIW. WNET's purchase was consummated on March 18, 2020, at a final price of $944,834. On June 15, 2020, the station rebranded and changed its calls to WLIW-FM, adding more national NPR programming to its lineup.

== Translator ==
Call sign	Frequency	City of license	FID	ERP (W)	HAAT	Class	Transmitter coordinates	FCC info
W245BA	96.9 FM	Manorville, New York	139341	10	143.8 m (472 ft)	D	40°50′32.4″N 73°2′23.4″W	LMS
