= First Nations Experience =

Non-profit television network in California

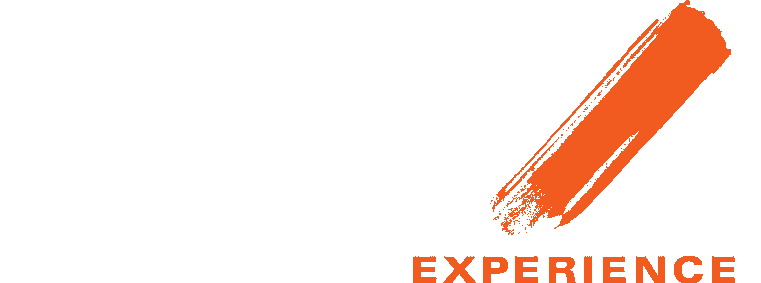
- Country: United States
- Headquarters: San Bernardino Valley College, San Bernardino, California

Ownership
- Owner: San Bernardino Community College District

History
- Founded: January 25, 2011
- Launched: September 25, 2011

Links
- Website: fnx.org

First Nations Experience (FNX) is a non-profit television network in San Bernardino, California, owned by the San Bernardino Community College District. The network, created by Executive Director Charles Fox, is broadcast from the KVCR-DT studios located inside the Media & Communications Building on the campus of San Bernardino Valley College on South Mount Vernon Avenue. FNX is America's first and only broadcast network aimed at Native Americans and global Indigenous audiences and consumers of Native American culture, through Native-produced and themed documentaries, dramatic series, nature, cooking, gardening, children's and arts programming.

== History ==
First Nation Experience was launched under the leadership of Executive Director Charles Fox on September 25, 2011, through a $6 million gift from its founding partner, the San Manuel Band of Mission Indians. On November 1, 2014, FNX became available via satellite to hundreds of non-profit public television service providers across the United States including public broadcasting TV stations (especially PBS member stations), community, tribal, religious, and others. On this date, FNX became available via satellite receiver set to 125° West from the PBS Satellite Service. In 2015, the San Manuel Band awarded FNX a second $6 million gift to help expand the station. The network currently reaches 47 million viewers in the United States.

== Affiliates ==
Channel	Station	Location	Owner
9.4	KUAC-TV	Fairbanks, Alaska	University of Alaska Fairbanks
29.1	KGRQ-LD	Gila River Indian Community, Arizona	Gila River Telecommunications
19.1	KGRX-LD	Gila River Indian Community, Arizona	Gila River Telecommunications
13.4	KEET	Eureka, California	Redwood Empire Public Television, Inc.
9.3	KIXE-TV	Redding, California	Northern California Educational Television
24.2	KVCR-DT	San Bernardino, California	San Bernardino Community College District
60.5	KPJK	San Mateo, California	Northern California Public Media
12.2	KBDI-TV	Broomfield, Colorado	Colorado Public Television
22.4	WRJK-LD	Arlington Heights, Illinois	Major Market Broadcasting
51.2	WEIU-TV	Charleston, Illinois	Eastern Illinois University
22.2	WVUT	Vincennes, Indiana	Vincennes University
10.6	KWCM	Granite Falls, Minnesota	Western & Southern Minnesota Public Television
20.6	KSMN	Worthington, Minnesota	Western & Southern Minnesota Public Television
9.2	KAWE	Bemidji, Minnesota	Northern Minnesota Public Television
22.2	KAWB	Brainerd, Minnesota	Northern Minnesota Public Television
12.5	KUON	Lincoln, Nebraska	Nebraska Public Media
26.5	KYNE	Omaha, Nebraska	Nebraska Public Media
19.5	KXNE	Norfolk, Nebraska	Nebraska Public Media
7.5	KMNE	Bassett, Nebraska	Nebraska Public Media
29.5	KHNE	Hastings, Nebraska	Nebraska Public Media
3.5	KLNE	Lexington, Nebraska	Nebraska Public Media
9.5	KPNE	North Platte, Nebraska	Nebraska Public Media
12.5	KRNE	Merriman, Nebraska	Nebraska Public Media
13.5	KTNE	Alliance, Nebraska	Nebraska Public Media
5.3	KNME-TV	Albuquerque, New Mexico	University of New Mexico
3.4	KENW	Portales, New Mexico	Eastern New Mexico University
14.1	WNDT-CD	New York, New York	The WNET Group
46.1	WMBQ-CD	New York, New York	The WNET Group
18.3	WNPI-DT	Norwood, New York	St. Lawrence Valley Educational Television Council, Inc.
16.3	WPBS-TV	Watertown, New York	St. Lawrence Valley Educational Television Council, Inc.
14.11	WTNG-CD	Lumberton, North Carolina	Mercy's Bridge Media, LLC
4.11	KRDK-TV	Fargo, North Dakota	Major Market Broadcasting (Parker Broadcasting of Dakota License, LLC)
45.3	WNEO	Alliance, Ohio	Western Reserve Public Media
49.3	WEAO	Akron, Ohio	Western Reserve Public Media
35.2	KRSU-TV	Claremore, Oklahoma	Rogers State University
47.1	K35MV-D	Concho, Oklahoma	Cheyenne and Arapaho Tribal Tribune
9.3	KUEN	Ogden, Utah	Utah State Board of Regents
7.5	KSPS	Spokane, Washington	KSPS Public Television
28.3	KBTC-TV	Tacoma, Washington	Bates Technical College
15.3	KCKA	Centralia, Washington	Bates Technical College

== See also ==
- World Indigenous Television Broadcasters Network
- Sacheen Littlefeather
