= Manmin Central Church =

South Korean Protestant Christian church

Coordinates: 37.27582°N 127.44836°E

- Hangul: 만민중앙교회
- Hanja: 萬民中央敎會
- Revised Romanization: Manmin Chung'ang Kyohoi
- McCune–Reischauer: Manmin Jung-ang Gyohoe

Manmin Central Church is a Christian church founded in Seoul, South Korea in 1982 by Jaerock Lee and is one of the largest churches in Korea. Manmin means ‘all creation; all the nations; all the people.’

Manmin Central church claims that they have the largest number of churches in Korea, and that they have 120,000 members throughout the world.

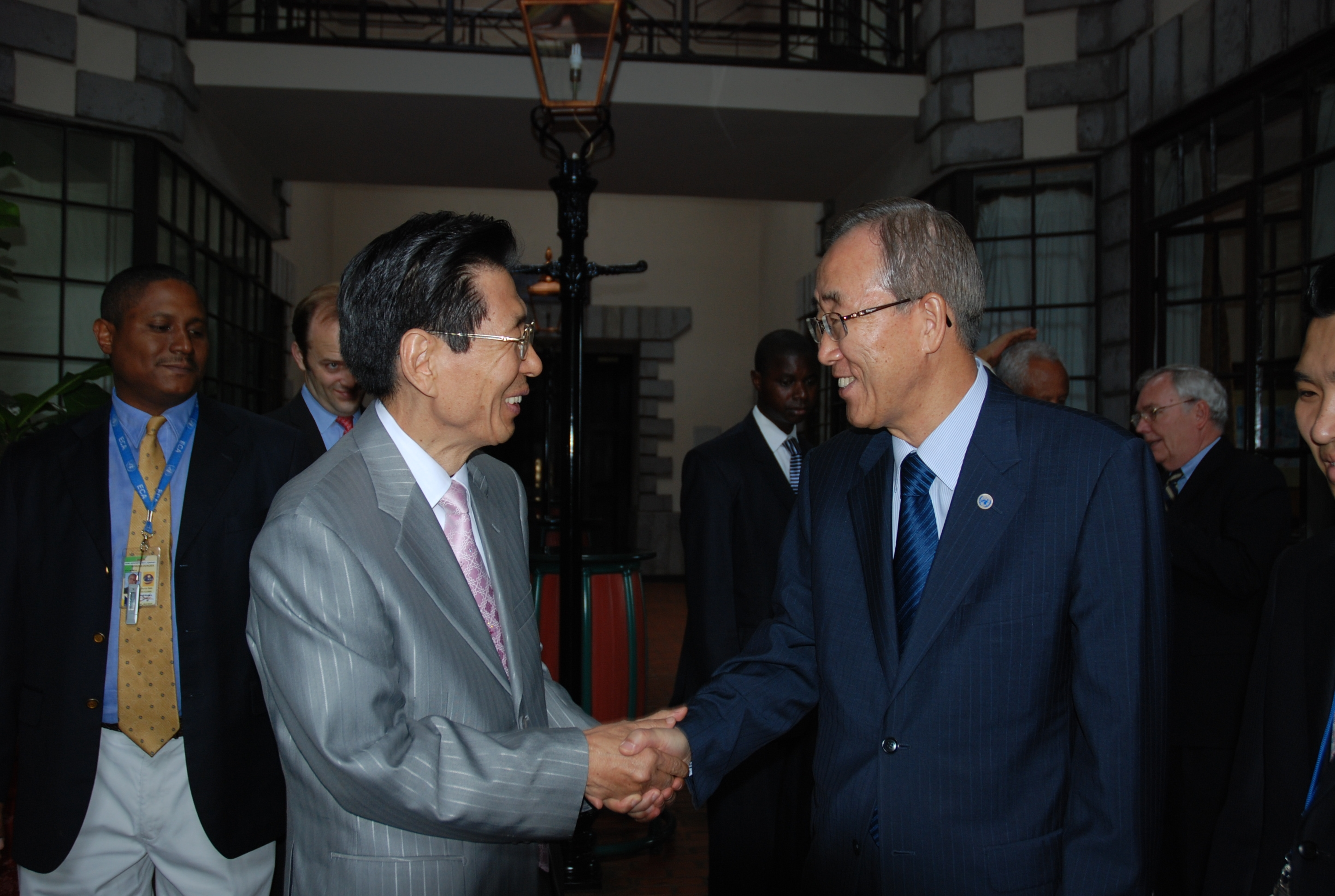
Bishop Dr. Myong-Ho Cheong (Senior Pastor, Nairobi Manmin Holiness Church, Kenya)(L) and Ban Ki-moon(Secretary-General of the United Nations)(R)

Manmin Church publishes Manmin News Paper, Manmin Magazine, and has a TV broadcasting station called GCN.

Manmin Church was led by Pastor Lee until his death in prison in December 2023. On December 31, 2023, after the death of Lee Jae-rock, the leader of the Manmin Central Church, due to colon cancer, the church appointed his third daughter, Pastor Lee Soo-jin, as the head pastor. On the morning of January 19, 2025, Lee Bok-nim, the widow of Pastor Lee Jae-rock, died, marking the loss of another key figure who had been a pillar of support for the Manmin Central Church.

== Christian activities ==
The church has organized a praise special orchestra entitled "Nissi". Nissi is one of the most important ministries in the Manmin Church and has been invited and performed in the National Breakfast Prayer Meetings, goodwill concerts at foreign embassies, and a variety of charitable events hosted by social and cultural organizations.

Manmin church participated in various Korean Christian activities, including events surrounding the 50th anniversary of the division of Korea and the FIFA World Cup in 2002.

In 1997, the church choir participated in Choir Festival in commemoration of Far East Broadcasting Company's 41st anniversary together with other churches.

In 1998, the senior pastor of the church joined The Korea Lawyers Mission Association. According to the Manmin News, the official newsletter of the church, 12 ambassadors to Korea partook in service at Manmin Central Church on March 7, 2010.

The church has sent missionaries to the United States, Japan, South America, and Africa.

== Criticism ==
The church was ejected from the Christian Council of Korea in April 1999 over a "heretical claim" allegedly made by Jaerock Lee in July 1998, when he stated that he was "sinless and exempted from dying".

In 1999, Munhwa Broadcasting Corporation, a South Korean TV broadcaster, aired PD Note, a documentary program criticizing Jaerock Lee. Members of the Manmin Central Church forcibly entered the TV station and cut off the power supply in the control room, interrupting the programme several times. Meanwhile, other supporters, numbering between 1,500 and 2,000 according to different sources, blocked off nearby roads. Manmin Central Church members later filed a lawsuit against the TV station. Three church leaders and eight members of the church were sentenced to jail for between two and a half years and three years for their roles in the protests.

On November 22, 2018, Jaerock Lee was sentenced to 15 years in prison on 42 counts of sexual harassment and sexual assault against eight of his followers. According to the Seoul Central District Court, the victims could not resist his advances "due to their absolute faith in the infallibility of the accused."

== Growth ==
The Manmin Church claims to have more than 120,000 members and 9,000 domestic and overseas branch churches throughout the globe, and has so far commissioned more than 103 missionaries to 22 countries, including the United States, Russia, Germany, Canada, Japan, China, France, India, Kenya. MMTC (Manmin Missionary Training Centre) was also established to provide cross-cultural training program and Ministry opportunities for world evangelism. In 1993, Manmin Central Church was selected as one of the “World's Top 50 Churches” by the Christian World magazine (US).

Many celebrities such as former prime minister of Korea Han Duck-soo were invited to Manmin church's anniversary.
