= Jaerock Lee =

South Korean pastor (1943–2023)

- 이재록
- Born: April 20, 1943; Muan County, Zenranan-dō, Chōsen
- Died: December 31, 2023 (aged 80); Gapyeong, province of Gyeonggi, South Korea
- Occupations: Pastor, author
- Spouse: Boknim Lee
- Website: www.drlee.or.kr

- Jaerock Lee
- Hangul: 이재록
- Hanja: 李載祿
- RR: I Jaerok
- MR: I Chaerok

Jaerock Lee (Korean: 이재록; April 20, 1943 – December 31, 2023) was a South Korean Christian pastor and convicted rapist who founded the Manmin Central Church in Seoul.

Lee founded the Manmin Central Church in 1982, and it grew into a megachurch with a claimed membership of 120,000 in 9,000 member churches. In 2010, Manmin Central church claimed to have the largest number of churches in South Korea. Lee's ministry was controversial, and he has been called a cult leader. Lee also authored many books that have been translated into several languages.

In 2018, Lee was convicted of multiple charges of sexual assault and rape against several members of his church, and he was sentenced to 15 years in prison. He died on December 31, 2023, at the age of 80.

== Early life ==
Before he converted, Lee had been sick for seven years. He attempted to commit suicide several times, but one day his elder sister took him to a Korean healing evangelist, after which he claimed his illnesses disappeared.

== 1982 to 1999 ==
Lee founded Manmin Central Church in July 1982 with just 13 members. The number of registered members continued to increase rapidly and passed 3,000 within five years of the founding. In this period, many church organizations such as Prayer Warriors' Mission, Volunteers' Mission, Choirs, and Performing Arts Committee have been organized.

Lee made a contribution for the construction of a hall for the aged.

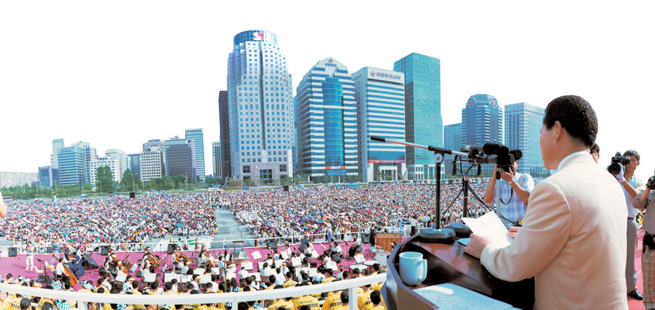
Lee makes a progress report to his followers in Seoul, 1995

In the 1990s his church experienced a dramatic increase in membership, both inside and outside of Korea, and the church was able to establish a new denomination. In 1993 his church was selected as one of the "World's Top 50 Churches" by the Christian World magazine (US). Lee was the head of the "World Holification Crusade" in 1992 in Yeouido, and he was the chairman of the 1994 "Holy Spirit Seoul Explosive Crusade", and the Administrative President of the "Peace Re-Unification Crusade for the 50th anniversary of Independence Day of Korea" in 1995. He was Chairman of the Korean Christian Association and the World Evangelization Central Association, and the President of the National Evangelism Campaign Center and the Evangelization Council for Prosecutory Officials.

== 2000 to 2010 ==
Lee traveled extensively in different parts of the world, initiating Christian events and so-called crusades in several countries.

In October 2000, Lee visited Pakistan. His church claims that this was the largest Christian evangelistic event ever held in Pakistan.

In 2001, Lee traveled in Kenya, and in September 2001, he visited the Philippines to lead the Church Leaders Conference and Healing Crusade.

On July 26–27, 2002, Lee led Honduras evangelistic meetings and an estimated 120,000 persons attended meetings in Olympic Stadium in San Pedro Sula, Honduras. In October 2009, H.E. Rene Francisco Umana, the Honduran ambassador to Korea, visited Lee's church to celebrate the church's 27th anniversary.

Lee led a healing festival at Marina Beach, Chennai, India, in 2002. The event was broadcast live on India's four television channels.

In 2003, a government official arranged for a Christian prayer and healing "festival" at the Dubai Handicapped Club in the United Arab Emirates. Lee spoke and performed a healing ceremony for 100 persons, including nationals, with various disabilities, reported the United States Department of State in the International Religious Freedom Report 2004.

In November 2003, Lee visited Russia to lead the "2003 Russia Miracle Healing Festival" at the "SKK" indoor Olympic Stadium in Saint Petersburg, Russia, which event was a part of the 300th anniversary of the founding of St. Petersburg.

In October 2004, Lee visited Germany to lead The 2004 German United Crusade and the event was broadcast through Classics TV in UK, CNL in Kazakhstan, RTVA in Spain, and TKV in Russia.

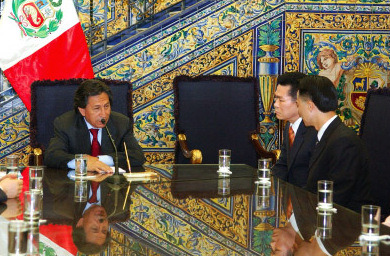
Lee meets with Peruvian president Alejandro Toledo (2004)

In December 2004, Lee visited Lima, Peru for a Christian event. Peruvian president Alejandro Toledo invited Lee to the presidential palace and requested he pray for the economic development and administration of the country.

In December 2005, Lee was denied permission to enter Egypt; he arrived at Cairo International Airport on a Korean Airlines flight with 20 of his members. He had been scheduled to lead a Christian event in Cairo together with Egyptian Christian organization at Christmas.

In February 2006, Lee visited Kinshasa, Democratic Republic of Congo and led a festival. The crusade was held with support from political and economic leaders as well as from the church leaders and the local press.

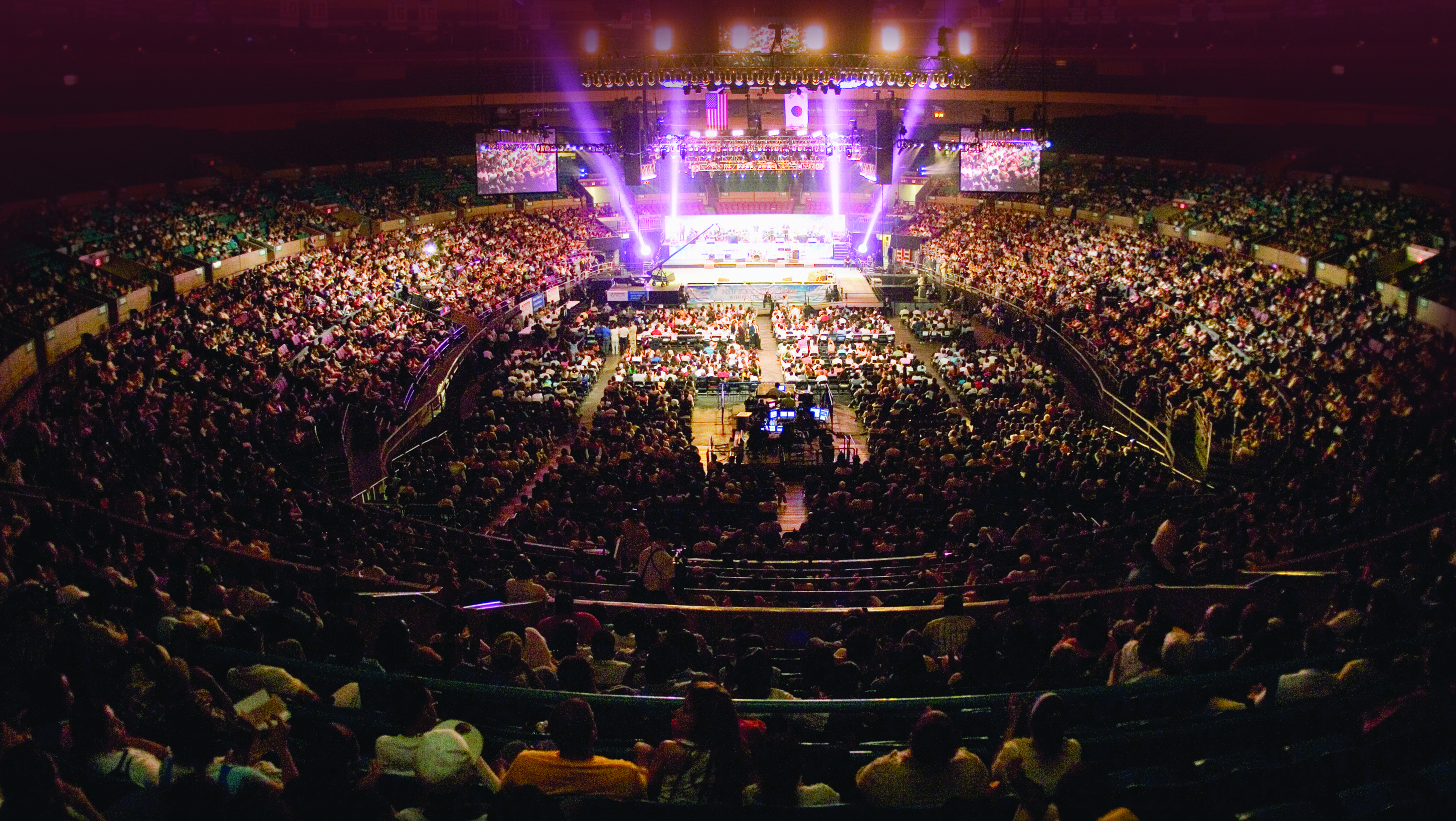
Salvation Miracles Revival Crusade in New York, USA (2006)

In July 2006, Lee went to the United States to lead a three-day "Salvation Miracles Revival Crusade" at New York City's Madison Square Garden, The event, which was endorsed by New York State Senator Rubén Díaz and New York City Councilman Hiram Monserrate, and the head of the National Religious Broadcasters attracted large numbers of Latinos and other members of immigrant groups.

The crusade was transmitted on television to 200 countries.

Lee visited Bethlehem at Christmas of 2007. In September 2009, Lee again visited Israel. While there, he led the "International Multi-Cultural Festival", at the International Convention Center in Jerusalem. The event drew roughly 3,000 attendees from 36 countries to rally for peace in the Middle East; attended by the Israeli minister of tourism Stas Misezhnikov and Jerusalem mayor Nir Barkat. Lee expressed his solidarity with the Jewish people, the State of Israel, and its leaders. A spokesperson for countermissionary organization Jewish Israel speculated that Lee's visit was connected to the planned launch of a Russian-language evangelical television station. The association of Israeli pastors established for the growth of Israeli churches and the union of pastors organized the event, CNS reported. The festival was broadcast to 220 nations in eight different languages by simultaneous interpretation through TV broadcasters including TBN (Trinity Broadcasting Network) and DayStar, Enlace, CNL etc.

In Estonia, Lee led an event called the "2010 Korean Culture Festival" or "Estonia Miracle Healing Crusade 2010" in Saku Suurhall Arena in October 2010. Alina Aivazova, wife of Leonid Chernovetskyi, Mayor of Kyiv, the capital of Ukraine, attended this crusade. Lee received the appreciation plaque from the municipality assembly of Tallinn.

== Death ==
Lee died on December 31, 2023, at the age of 80.

== Early controversies ==
Lee was excommunicated from the Church of Holiness in May 1990, and his organization was ejected from the Christian Council of Korea in April 1999 over "heretical claims". The 1999 accusations were refuted by Korea's Union of Presbyterian Churches in 2004. Leaders of the Korean Missionary Association also accused him of being a cult leader, pointing to an alleged July 1998 statement by Lee that he was "sinless and exempted from dying".

In 1999, Munhwa Broadcasting Corporation, a South Korean television broadcaster, aired a documentary critical of Jaerock Lee. In response, 300 Manmin Central Church members invaded the television station, attacking security guards and breaking into the station control room to cut the power, while another 1,500 organized a sit-down protest in a nearby street; 600 riot police were needed to restore order. The station had previously been prevented by court order from airing a story on Lee's sex life. MBC filed a lawsuit against the church and 61 people involved in the attack, seeking damages of ₩2.7 billion; the Seoul Southern District Court granted damages in the amount of ₩696 million in November 2000 against the church and some of the participants in the attack, but threw out the case against Lee himself.

In July 2000, Lee visited Uganda to lead the Uganda United Crusade. The Korean Missionary Association in Uganda released a statement in connection to this visit, describing Lee as a "cult leader" and stating that he was "not well accepted by Korean Churches".

When Lee visited New York and Madison Square Garden in 2006, local Korean ministers protested against the festival, citing what they referred to as "heretical teachings" of Lee. Major League Baseball player David Wright, third baseman for the New York Mets, was tricked into doing a commercial for Lee's crusade; Wright agreed to appear on camera and offer an endorsement because he believed that the event had already been approved by the Mets, but in fact, the advertisement, which featured unauthorized uses of the Mets' logo, was being put together by a reporter who misused his press credentials to gain access to Wright and film him. After the misuse came to light, broadcasting of the advertisement ceased, and Wright publicly apologized.

Estonian singers Tõnis Mägi and Dave Benton were to appear at Lee's Korean Culture Festival event in Estonia in 2010. The singers were led to believe that the event was sponsored by the South Korean embassy, which turned out to be false, prompting Mägi to cancel his appearance. The Korean grand embassy in Helsinki regretted having been mistakenly connected to the festival.

== Sex crimes ==
In November 2018, Lee was convicted of 42 counts of sex crimes by the Seoul Central District Court. He sexually assaulted and repeatedly raped eight women in his congregation, all of whom were in their twenties and had grown up in the Manmin church community. The court found that the victims felt compelled to submit to Lee's attacks because they believed his claims that he had divine power. At least five of the victims contacted police as a result of the #MeToo movement. The pastor was sentenced to fifteen years in prison and 80 hours of therapy, and received a decade-long ban on working with minors.

== Missionary activities ==
Lee sent missionaries to Asia, the Americas, Europe and Africa. Lee believed that God gave a vision for the construction of Grand Sanctuary and had the members pray for it.

== World Christian Doctors Network ==
Lee founded the World Christian Doctors Network (WCDN), which organizes an annual conference. The WCDN attempts to medically analyze supposed healing cases performed by God.

== Books ==
Lee wrote a number of books about his approach to Christianity. His books are published by Christian publishers around the world such as Strang (USA), Destiny Image Europe (Italy), Baruch (Ukraine), Word of Christ (India), Andi (Indonesia), and Grace (Taiwan). As of September 2014, Lee had written more than 90 titles. His book ministry specialized in e-books including Chinese-language editions.

=== Professions ===
Professions is a collection of 100 poems.

=== My Life, My Faith ===
Lee's autobiography is called My Life, My Faith. He outlined factors that contributed to the growth of the church, and claimed that God gave him prophetic visions. My Life, My Faith Volume 1 has been published in 35 languages. In the second volume of My Life, My Faith, Lee wrote about the US, China and the EU and said that in the future, the world would have these three major powers. He also claimed that Christians can be healed from diseases by faith.

Bulawayo 24 News gave the books a favorable review. In Vietnam, the books My Life, My Faith have been published with official permission from its government in its vernacular language by Vietnam Religion Publisher (VRP).

The Message of the Cross of Jesus Christ

The Italian Christian publisher Evangelista Media published Understanding the Message of the Cross of Jesus Christ. Richard R. Blake reviewed the book for Reader Views in the US. The Message of the Cross has been published in 57 different languages, including English, Nepalese, and Indian vernacular languages such as Hindi, Tamil, Telugu, Punjabi, Simte, and Tangkhul. The Hindi version of the book was covered by CNN-IBN.

=== The Law of God ===
The Law of God is a collection of Lee's topical messages on the Ten Commandments. The primary focus of the book is the reason behind the Ten Commandments and the spiritual significance of each Commandment.

=== The Power of God ===
In the book The Power of God, Lee has attempted to introduce the process in which a person may meet God.

=== Heaven ===
Creation House, an imprint of Christian publisher Charisma Media in the US published the first volume of Lee's book Heaven. In Heaven volume 1, Lee discusses the different places of heaven: Paradise, the First Kingdom of Heaven, the Second Kingdom of Heaven, the Third Kingdom of Heaven, New Jerusalem and the rewards given according to each one's measure of faith. In the second volume of Heaven, Lee writes that the combination of twelve precious stones represents the heart of Jesus Christ and God. Lee also wrote about the prophets in the first-ranked group in heaven: Elijah, Enoch, Abraham, and Moses.

The Indonesian translation of Heaven and Hell has been listed as a bestseller in Indonesia. At the Jerusalem Book Fair in 2011, the president of Israel Shimon Peres and the mayor of Jerusalem mayor Nir Barkat received copies of the book.

=== Man of Flesh, Man of Spirit ===
Man of Flesh, Man of Spirit (Vol. 1 and 2), is a compilation of Lee's sermons on the Book of Job. Lee discusses what he perceives to be the evilness in human nature.

=== Spirit, Soul and Body ===
In the book Spirit, Soul and Body, Lee deals with the question "What did God, who existed all by Himself before all eternity, look like?" The book discusses possible meanings of such biblical terms as 'flesh', 'things of the flesh', 'works of the flesh', and 'spirit'. Lee writes that the 'heavens' were generally categorized into four spiritual realms. The entire physical space including Earth, the Solar System, the Milky Way Galaxy, and the whole universe is referred to as the first heaven.

=== Love: Fulfillment of the Law ===
The book discusses the love of God.

=== Footsteps of the Lord ===
Footsteps of the Lord is a compilation of Lee's series "Lectures on the Gospel of John". He discusses Jesus' origin as well as the spiritual meaning embedded in Jesus' birth, public ministry, crucifixion, and resurrection.

=== My Father Will Give to You in My Name ===
My Father Will Give to You in My Name is a compilation of messages and Lee claims that this book will enable the reader to understand "the law of the spiritual realm" on receiving answers from God.

=== Against Such Things There Is No Law ===
Against Such Things There is No Law discusses the "nine fruits of the Holy Spirit" along with specific examples.

== Bibliography ==
- Understanding the Message of the Cross of Jesus Christ (ISBN 978-8889127650)
- Heaven(1) (ISBN 978-1599790183)
- Heaven(2) (ISBN 978-8975572135)
- Hell (ISBN 978-8975572531)
- The Power of God (ISBN 978-1554522576)
- The Law of God (ISBN 978-967-5372-06-3)
- Man of Flesh, Man of Spirit (2) (ISBN 978-8975572708)
- Tasting Eternal Life Before Death (ISBN 978-8975570377)
