= City of license =

Geography-based broadcasting license

In North American (U.S., Canadian, and Mexican) broadcasting, a city of license or community of license is the community that a radio station or television station is officially licensed to serve by that country's broadcast regulator.

In North American broadcast law, the concept of community of license dates to the early days of AM radio broadcasting. The requirement that a broadcasting station operate a main studio within a prescribed distance of the community which the station is licensed to serve appears in U.S. law as early as 1939.

Various specific obligations have been applied to broadcasters by governments to fulfill public policy objectives of broadcast localism, both in radio and later also in television, based on the legislative presumption that a broadcaster fills a similar role to that held by community newspaper publishers.

== United States ==
In the United States, the Communications Act of 1934 requires that "the Commission shall make such distribution of licenses, frequencies, hours of operation, and of power among the several States and communities as to provide a fair, efficient, and equitable distribution of radio service to each of the same." The Federal Communications Commission interprets this as requiring that every broadcast station "be licensed to the principal community or other political subdivision which it primarily serves." For each broadcast service, the FCC defines a standard for what it means to serve a community; for example, commercial FM radio stations are required to provide a field strength of at least 3.16 millivolts per meter (mV/m) over the entire land area of the community, whereas non-commercial educational FM stations need only provide a field strength of 1 mV/m over 50% of the community's population. This electric field contour is called the "principal community contour".

The Federal Communications Commission (FCC) makes other requirements on stations relative to their communities of license; these requirements have varied over time. One example is the requirement for stations to identify themselves, by call sign and community, at sign-on, sign-off, and at the top of every hour of operation. Other current requirements include providing a local telephone number in the community's calling area (or else a toll-free number). The former requirement to (in most cases) maintain an official main studio within 25 miles of the community's geographic center was discontinued in October 2017 when the regulation was amended.

== Policy and regulatory issues ==
=== Nominal main studio requirements ===
The requirement that a station maintain a main studio within a station's primary coverage area or within a maximum distance of the community of license originated in an era in which stations were legally required to generate local content and the majority of a station's local, non-network programming was expected to originate in one central studio location. In this context, the view of broadcast regulators held that an expedient way to ensure that content broadcast reflected the needs of a local community was to allocate local broadcast stations and studios to each individual city.

The nominal main studio requirement has become less relevant with the introduction of videotape recorders in 1956 (which allowed local content to be easily generated off-site and transported to stations), the growing portability of broadcast-quality production equipment due to transistorization, and the elimination of requirements (in 1987 for most classes of US broadcast stations) that broadcasters originate any minimum amount of local content.

While the main studio concept nominally remains in US broadcast regulations, and certain administrative requirements (such as the local employment of a manager and the equivalent of at least one other full-time staff member, as well as the maintenance of a public inspection file) are still applied, removal of the requirement that stations originate local content greatly weakens the significance of maintaining a local main studio. A facility capable of originating programming and feeding it to a transmitter must still exist, but under normal conditions there most often is no requirement that these local studio actually be in active use to originate any specific local programming.

In many cases, the use of centralcasting and broadcast automation has greatly weakened the role and importance of manual control by staff at the nominal local station studio facilities.

Exceptions to these rules have been made by regulators, primarily on a case-by-case basis, to deal with "satellite stations": transmitters which are licensed to comply with the technical requirements of full service broadcast facilities and have their own independent call signs and communities of license but are used simply as full-power broadcast translators to rebroadcast another station. These are most often non-commercial educational stations or stations serving thinly populated areas which otherwise would be too small to support an independent local full-service broadcaster.

=== Political considerations ===
The requirement that a full-service station maintain local presence in its community of license has been used by proponents of localism and community broadcasting as a means to oppose the construction and use of local stations as mere rebroadcasters or satellite-fed translators of distant stations. Without specific requirements for service to the local community of license, stations could be constructed in large number by out-of-region broadcasters who feed transmitters via satellite and offer no local content.

There also has been a de facto preference by regulators to encourage the assignment of broadcast licenses to smaller cities which otherwise would have no local voice, instead of allowing all broadcast activity to be concentrated in large metropolitan areas already served by many existing broadcasters.

When dealing with multiple competing US radio station applications, current FM allotment priorities are: (1) first full-time aural service; (2) second full-time aural service; (3) first local aural transmission service; and (4) Other public interest matters.

Similar criteria were extended to competing applicants for non-commercial stations by US legislation passed in 2000.

==== Suburban community problem ====
Any policy favoring applicants for communities not already served by an existing station has had the unintended effect of encouraging applicants to merely list a small suburb of a large city, claiming to be the "first station in the community" even though the larger city is well served by many existing stations. "The Suburban Community Problem" was recognized in FCC policy as early as 1965. "Stations in metropolitan areas often tend to seek out national and regional advertisers and to identify themselves with the entire metropolitan area rather than with the particular needs of their specified communities," according to an FCC policy statement of the era. In order "to discourage applicants for smaller communities who would be merely substandard stations for neighboring, larger communities," the FCC established the so-called "Suburban Community presumption" which required applicants for AM stations in such markets to demonstrate that they had ascertained the unmet programming needs of the specific communities and were prepared to satisfy those needs.

By 1969, the same issues had spread to FM licensing; instead of building transmitters in the community to nominally be served, applicants would often seek to locate the tower site at least halfway to the next major city. In one such precedent case (the Berwick Doctrine), the FCC required a hearing before Berwick, a prospective broadcaster, could locate transmitters midway between Pittston, Pennsylvania (the city of license), and a larger audience in Wilkes-Barre.

A related problem was that of 'move-in'. Outlying communities would find their small-town local stations sold to outsiders, who would then attempt to change the community of license to a suburb of the nearest major city, move transmitter locations or remove existing local content from broadcasts in an attempt to move into the larger city.

The small town of Anniston, Alabama, due to its location 90 miles west of Atlanta and 65 miles east of Birmingham, has lost local content from both TV and FM stations which were re-targeted at one of the two larger urban centers or moved outright. (WHMA-FM Anniston is now licensed as WNNX College Park, Georgia—an Atlanta suburb—after a failed attempt to relicense it to Sandy Springs, Georgia—another Atlanta suburb. Transmitters are now in downtown Atlanta.) The same is true for WJSU, which served East Alabama with local news until the station was merged into a triplex to form ABC 33/40 which focuses its coverage on the central part of the state.

A 1988 precedent case (Faye and Richard Tuck, 3 FCC Rcd 5374, 1988) created the "Tuck Analysis" as a standard which attempts to address the Suburban Community Problem on a case-by-case basis by examining:

1. the station's proposed signal coverage over the urbanized area (the "Coverage Factor");
2. the relative population size and distance between the suburban community and the urban market (the "Relative Size and Distance Factor"); and
3. the independence of the suburban community, based on various factors that would indicate self-sufficiency (the "Independence Factor").

Despite the best intentions of regulators, the system remains prone to manipulation.

This has almost become a parlor game. The goal of the game—whether you're applying for a new station or a station currently licensed to a rural area—is to move as close to a big market as possible. The closer you get to a big market, the more potential listeners you can reach and hence the more advertising dollars you can attract. But there's a catch—at least there's supposed to be. The Commission is required by Section 307(b) of the Communications Act "to provide a fair, efficient, and equitable distribution of radio service" to "the several States and communities." The FCC cannot simply permit radio stations to relocate from rural areas to well-served urban markets without violating that mandate. That's when the game gets interesting. Under our FM allotment rules, the Commission will give a preference to any applicant that proposes to serve a community with no current licensees—i.e., not that the community doesn't receive radio service (it could receive service from dozens of stations) but that no station lists that particular community as its "community of license." That's where a good atlas comes in handy. The next step is to scour the maps to find a community near an urban area that doesn't yet have any stations licensed to it. You win the game if you get the FCC to grant you a preference for providing "first service" to a close-in suburban community while being able to cover the larger market.

— Commissioners Copps & Adelstein, Federal Communications Commission, 2008

=== Licensing and on-air identity ===
While becoming less meaningful over the decades, stations are still required to post a public file somewhere within 25 miles of the city, and to cover the entire city with a local radio signal. In the United States, a station's transmitter must be located so that it can provide a strong signal over nearly all of its "principal community" (5 mV/m or stronger at night for AM stations, 70 dbuV for FM, 35 dbu for DTV channels 2–6, 43 dbu for channels 7-13 and 48 dbu for channels 14+), even if it primarily serves another city. For example, American television station WTTV primarily serves Indianapolis; however, the transmitter is located farther south than the other stations in that city because it is licensed to Bloomington, 50 miles south of Indianapolis (it maintains a satellite station, WTTK, licensed to Kokomo, Indiana, but in the digital age, WTTK is for all intents and purposes the station's main signal, transmitting from the traditional Indianapolis transmitter site). In some cases, such as Jeannette, Pennsylvania-licensed WPKD-TV 19, the FCC has waived this requirement; the station claimed that retaining an existing transmitter site 25.6 miles southeast of its new community of license of Jeannette would be in compliance with the commission's minimum distance separation requirements (avoiding interference to co-channel WOIO 19 Shaker Heights). Another extreme example of a station's transmitter located far from the city of license is the FM station KPNT, formerly licensed to Ste. Genevieve, Missouri, and transmitting from Hillsboro, but serving the St. Louis and Metro East market to the north. In 2015, the station was allowed by the FCC to move their city of license to Collinsville, Illinois, and have a transmitter in St. Louis proper with a power decrease.

FCC regulations also require stations at least once an hour to state the station's call letters, followed by the city of license. However, the FCC has no restrictions on additional names after the city of license, so many stations afterwards add the nearest large city. For example, CBS affiliate WOIO is licensed to Shaker Heights, a suburb of Cleveland, and thus identifies as "WOIO Shaker Heights-Cleveland." Similarly, northern New York's WWNY-TV (also a CBS affiliate) identifies as "WWNY-TV 7 Carthage-Watertown" as a historical artifact; the original broadcasts originated from Champion Hill in 1954 so the license still reflects this tiny location. (Note: It is possible for two stations to have the same studio location and transmit from the same mast at the same site, but be licensed to different communities; WWNY-TV and WNYF-CD (Carthage and Watertown NY, respectively) are one example.)

If the station is licensed in the primary city served, on occasion the station will list a second city or region next to it. For example, the Tampa Bay region's Fox owned-and-operated station WTVT is licensed to Tampa, Florida, its primary city, but identifies on-air as "WTVT Tampa/St. Petersburg", as St. Petersburg is another major city in the market. To encompass Appleton and the smaller cities clustered around the Fox River southwest of Green Bay, Wisconsin, stations in the Green Bay–Appleton area identify as "Green Bay/Fox Cities" (e.g. "WBAY-TV, Green Bay/Fox Cities"); Green Bay-licensed stations thus still carry an official identification, while providing the ability for stations licensed to other places in the region to officially prefix their name before the mention of "Green Bay/Fox Cities".

There is no longer a requirement to carry programs relevant to the particular community, (Note: There are a few rare exceptions, even in the US. US low-power FM stations were originally introduced with far more stringent broadcast localism requirements than any other station class. Broadcast regulators may also add extra restrictions to one specific licence: 13 Newark was only allowed to move its facilities to New York City on condition that the licence, station ID and 2.5 hours/week of community programming remain with New Jersey. That local programming remains today. Non-US stations are subject to their own nation's rules — a full-power rebroadcaster is easier to licence in Canada or México, but an originating station in Canada must gather local news.) or even necessarily to operate or transmit from that community. Accordingly, stations licensed to smaller communities in major metropolitan markets often target programming toward the entire market rather than the official home community, and often move their studio facilities to the larger urban centre as well. For instance, the Canadian radio station CFNY-FM is officially licensed to Brampton, Ontario, although its studio and transmitter facilities are located in downtown Toronto.

This may, at times, lead to confusion — while media directories normally list broadcast stations by their legal community of license, audiences often disregard (or may even be entirely unaware of) the distinction. For instance, for a short time while resolving a license conflict and ownership transaction in 1989, the current day KCAL-TV in Los Angeles was licensed to the little-known southeast suburb of Norwalk, California, with the station's identifications at the time only vocally mentioning the temporary city of license in a rushed form, with Norwalk barely receiving any visual mention on the station; at no time were any station assets actually based in Norwalk, nor was public affairs or news programming adjusted to become Norwalk-centric over that of Los Angeles and Southern California. The station returned to its Los Angeles city of license after the transaction was complete.

Often, a station will keep a tiny outlying community in its licensing and on-air identity long after the original rationale for choosing that location is no longer truly applicable. Sneedville, Tennessee, as city of license for PBS member station WETP-TV originally made sense as a compromise location to serve both Knoxville and the Tri-Cities of Tennessee and Virginia on VHF channel 2. It met the minimum distance requirements to two other channel 2 stations in the region, WKRN in Nashville and WSB-TV in Atlanta. This became less important after full-power UHF satellite WKOP-TV signed on in Knoxville, and irrelevant once the 2003-09 DTV transition and 2016-21 repack moved WETP's main signal to physical channel UHF 24. Nonetheless, broadcasters and regulatory authorities are more likely to retain the original city of license, rather than bring unwanted scrutiny for taking away a small community's only station, which may be a mark of civic pride, only to move it to some larger center which already has multiple stations.

== Table of allotments ==
In the United States, the Federal Communications Commission maintains a Table of Allotments, which assigns individual channel frequencies to individual cities or communities for both TV and FM radio.

A corresponding Table of Allotments for digital television was created in 1997. To operate a licensed station, a broadcaster must first obtain allocation of the desired frequencies in the FCC's Table of Allotments for the intended city of license. This process is subject to various political and bureaucratic restrictions, based on considerations including the number of existing stations in the area. (Note: It is possible for an applicant to petition the FCC for rulemaking to change the table of allotments, but it is a long bureaucratic process. The original 1952 allotments for New York State TV had 2,4,7,17,*23,59 (* non-commercial education) allocated to Buffalo or Buffalo-Niagara, while Watertown is only allocated 48. An applicant who wanted to build 7 in Watertown, for example, would encounter multiple obstacles: They'd have to petition the FCC to change the table of allotments. They'd have to show adequate distance from existing same-channel allocations (in those days, 175 miles, straight-line). They'd have to show adequate distance from adjacent-channel stations (so 7 or 9 couldn't have been assigned to Syracuse without some major reshuffling of existing channels if 8 was CBS in that city way back WHEN). Within 200 miles of the Canada or Mexico border? Everything becomes subject to international co-ordination. Find your tiny spot 175 miles from Buffalo and nowhere near anything else on 7 or 8, jump through all the bureaucratic hoops to add that community to the Table of Allotments, get that channel allotted to that community, convince the FCC that your application is in the public interest and eventually, maybe your channel 7 will flicker to life, live long and prosper. A more complex application (such as the attempts to shoehorn a third VHF into Syracuse and Rochester for ABC in the 1960s) might involve swapping allocations between multiple communities or even displacing existing stations in frequency or location. For instance, if Syracuse already had CBS 8, poaching a vacant 9 Elmira and moving that allocation to Syracuse required that 8 Syracuse swap channels with 5 Rochester, which then allowed a Toronto station to move to 5, which then left 6 vacant for a Canadian broadcaster or two.)

The term "city" has in some cases been relaxed to mean "community", often including the unincorporated areas around the city that share a mailing address. This sometimes leads to inconsistencies, such as the licensing of one metro Atlanta station to the unincorporated Cobb County community of Mableton, but the refusal to license another to Sandy Springs, which is one of the largest cities in the state, and was at the time an unincorporated part of Fulton County due to political complications involving its eventual incorporation from both the state and its containing county of Fulton.

The definition of a "community" also comes into play when a broadcaster wants to take a station away from a tiny hamlet like North Pole, New York, whose population is in decline. In general, regulators are loath to allow a community's only license to be moved away - especially to a city which already has a station. (Note: A rare few exceptions were made to accommodate the then-fledgling third-rank American Broadcasting Company in the 1950s and early 1960s. There was also a loophole to accommodate stations which no longer reached their original communities of license after having sold their spectrum in the 2016 United States wireless spectrum auction).) A broadcaster may make the case that the "community" functionally no longer exists in order to be released from its local obligations.

Often, the city of license does not correspond to the location of the station itself, of the primary audience or of the communities identified in the station's branding and advertising.

Some of the more common reasons for a community of license to be listed as a point far from the actual audience (Note: There is also one special case involving the Windsor-Detroit market. Licensing a station to Windsor carries a unique obstacle - content which is already on the Detroit stations will not be provided to a Canadian station in the same market, even though Windsor is in a different country. Using an outlying station just outside the Windsor-Essex market boundaries may therefore allow access to programming which might not be available to a Windsor-licensed station.) include:

=== The "compromise" location ===
A broadcaster may wish to serve two different communities, both in the same region but far enough from each other that a transmitter in one market would provide poor service to the other. While a transmitter in each community served would be preferable, occasionally a station licensed to a small town between the two larger centres will be used.

Broadcaster	City	Community of license	Comments
CBK (AM) 540	Regina	Watrous	The original historic AM transmitter was built in Watrous in 1939 to serve both Regina and Saskatoon from studios in Regina. Both cities are now served by local FM repeaters of CBK, yet the original clear-channel AM 540 and the community of license remain with tiny Watrous.
CHWI-TV 16 / 60 CTV 2	Windsor	Wheatley	Founded 1993 as an independent local television station, licensed to Wheatley in an attempt to serve both Chatham and Windsor, Ontario. The UHF 16 Wheatley transmitter proved inadequate to cover Windsor so, in 1995, a Windsor repeater was deployed on channel 60. Newsrooms are in Windsor.

=== The suburban station ===
In FM radio broadcasting, small local stations were sometimes built to serve suburban or outlying areas in an era where AM radio stations held the largest audiences and much of the FM spectrum lay vacant. In the era of vacuum tubes, the five-tube AM radio with no FM tuning capability and limited audio quality was common; later advances in receiver design were to make good-quality FM commonplace (even though most AM/FM stereo receivers still have severely limited AM frequency response and no AM stereo decoders). Eventually FM spectrum became a very scarce commodity in many markets as AM stations moved to the FM dial, relegating AM largely to talk radio. As cities expanded, former small-town FM stations found themselves not only in what were now becoming rapidly expanding suburbs but also on what was becoming some of the most valuable spectrum in broadcast radio. The once-tiny FM stations would often then be sold, increased (where possible) to much-higher power and used to serve a huge mainstream audience in the larger metropolitan area.

Broadcaster	City	Community of license	Comments
CFNY-FM 102.1	Toronto	Brampton, Ontario	Originally a neglected side operation for the small-town station CHIC whose range only served Brampton proper, the station transmitted with 857 watts, only simulcasting its AM sister, then adopting an alternative-rock format in which entire albums were broadcast nonstop with just a break for CHIC's on-duty operator to flip and change records. The station has since changed hands various times in the 1980s and now broadcasts from Toronto's CN Tower with a modern rock format. Effectively now a Toronto station, the city of license still indicates Brampton, which itself has grown well beyond the 20,000 people the station served in 1960 and become a major suburb in the Greater Toronto Area.
KROQ-FM 106.7	Los Angeles	Pasadena, California	Originally owned by the Pasadena Presbyterian Church and, until 1969, broadcast from a studio in the basement of the church. Multiple changes of ownership, location, format and callsign (the station went bankrupt more than once) ended with Infinity Broadcasting (now Audacy) buying the station in 1986 and moving the studios to Burbank the following year. It retains its Pasadena city of license, though it now originates from the Miracle Mile under corporate Audacy ownership.

=== The short-spaced station ===
To avoid co-channel interference, a minimum distance is maintained between stations operating on the same frequency in different markets. On VHF, full-power stations are typically 175 miles or more apart before the same channel is used again. An otherwise-desirable channel may therefore be unavailable to a community unless either it is operated at greatly reduced-height and power, forced onto a strongly directional antenna pattern to protect the distant co-channel station or relocated to some other, more distant location in the region to maintain proper spacing. The choice of another community as home for a station can be one possible means to avoid short-spacing, effectively shifting the entire station's coverage area to maintain the required distances between transmitters.

Broadcaster	City	Community of license	Comments
CJOH-TV-6 CTV	Kingston	Deseronto, Ontario	Transmitter primarily served Kingston, but its construction at full-power in Kingston itself would have resulted in interference to a small part of the CBMT (CBC 6 Montreal) coverage area. The station was therefore built further west, on Mount Carmel in Deseronto, to cover Kingston and Belleville. (The last of CJOH's rebroadcasters were taken dark in 2020.) Co-channel CIII-TV 6 (Global) would in turn be pushed westward to Paris, Ontario, when it signed on a few years later, causing it to need a powerful UHF rebroadcaster to adequately cover the Toronto area.
CJOH-TV-8 CTV	Montreal	Cornwall, Ontario	CJSS-TV 8 Cornwall was the first Canadian OTA TV station to fail; it was a local CBC TV affiliate station originating content from 1959 to 1963 but could not compete with the network's owned-and-operated station, CBMT 6 Montreal. Ernie Bushnell purchased CJSS-TV 8 to rebroadcast his Ottawa CTV member station CJOH-TV into the Montreal market. The VHF 8 slot could not be assigned to Montréal directly, in order to protect co-channel WMTW. As a rimshot, channel 8 was carried on cable in Montreal for many years; it was ultimately dropped from Vidéotron as, once CJOH-TV and CFCF-TV were both owned by the network, they were largely duplicating the same programming. Bell Media pulled the plug on the station in 2017
WCNY-TV 7 CBS (now WWNY-TV)	Watertown	Carthage, New York	Watertown is close to a long list of places - Montréal (155 mi), Ottawa (100 mi), Toronto (175 mi), Buffalo (165 mi), Rochester (105 mi), Binghamton (130 mi), Albany (140 mi) and Plattsburgh-Burlington (130 mi and 140 mi) - too far to receive OTA TV from any of them, but too close to use the same channels again. Syracuse and Utica (75 mi) may or may not be receivable. Once VHF 11 had been assigned to Canada, there's nothing left. (Note: Watertown NY in 1952-54 would have been free to request allotment of any full-power VHF TV channel which is not co-channel to 2 Montréal, 2 Buffalo, 3 Syracuse, 3 Burlington, 4 Ottawa, 4 Buffalo, 4 Albany, 5 Rochester, 5 North Pole, 6 Montreal, 7 Buffalo, 8 Syracuse, 8 Cornwall, 9 Ottawa, 10 Rochester, 10 Montréal, 10 Albany, 11 Kingston, 12 Binghamton, 12 Montreal or 13 Utica. There were also minimum distances between adjacent-channel stations.) Watertown was allotted UHF 48; a 1952 construction permit listed WWNY-TV Watertown, New York, as community of license. WWNY returned the UHF 48 permit unbuilt (Note: Many early permits were left unbuilt and eventually cancelled as the vast majority of the UHF pioneers who launched during the 1952 land rush were already out of business, most within the first year. The All-Channel Receiver Act required UHF tuners in all 1964-model or later US TV receivers; that's too late for many stations which launched in the 1950s. ACRA did not apply to Canada, where 12-channel TV's continued to be sold through the 1960s.) on March 10, 1954 in exchange for WCNY-TV 7 Carthage (a tiny hamlet ten miles further east). That pushed the station clear of Buffalo; it signed on from Champion Hill on October 22, 1954, and never looked back. (Buffalo signed on WKBW-TV 7 on the same channel, 175 miles away, in 1958.) The studio was moved to Watertown in 1971 and the signal moved from VHF DT7 to VHF DT8 in the 2020 repack, but the transmitter and license remain at their original location. UHF finally came to Watertown in 1971, when non-commercial WNPE/WNPI signed on from "Watertown and Norwood". (Note: Watertown's market boundaries are drawn to include Massena, some 90mi distant. A single full-power UHF transmitter is not enough to cover the entire market. Non-commercial WPBS-TV avoided this issue by signing on two full-power transmitters (Watertown and Norwood) with identical content. A commercial station likely could not do the same without proof of economic hardship in some form. KVRR (four full-power VHF transmitters) is one such commercial station, but only qualifies due to an extreme rural location on the North Dakota border.) Cross-border rival CKWS 11 Kingston did make it to air a few months after WWNY, but all subsequent new entrants were forced to outlying communities or UHF on both sides of the border.
WITI 6 Fox; CBS at the time	Milwaukee	Whitefish Bay, Wisconsin	WITI originally signed on in 1956 with the North Shore suburb of Whitefish Bay as nominal community of license operating from a transmission site far north of Milwaukee in the then-rural Ozaukee County town of Mequon (which has since been incorporated as the City of Mequon) as the allocation of VHF 6 to Milwaukee itself at the time would have left the station short-spaced to WJIM-TV in Lansing, Michigan, and WOC-TV in Davenport, Iowa. By 1962, its new transmitter in Shorewood was activated, and its community of license was shifted to Milwaukee as the FCC learned how to better finesse distancing requirements and allow some exceptions depending on area geography.
WETP 2 PBS	Knoxville; Tri-Cities	Sneedville, Tennessee	East Tennessee Public Television was founded in 1967 with a transmitter atop Short Mountain in tiny Sneedville (pop. 1000) as the only location which could reach both Knoxville and Johnson City, Tennessee, on this frequency without being short-spaced to co-channel stations in Nashville to the west, Atlanta to the south and Greensboro to the east. A local signal was extended into Knoxville itself in 1990 using WKOP, a UHF station.

=== The distant mountaintop antenna ===
In hilly or mountainous regions, a city would often be built in a waterfront or lakeside location (such as Plattsburgh-Burlington, both on Lake Champlain) - lower ground which in turn would be surrounded by tall mountain peaks. The only reliable means to get the VHF television or radio signals over the mountains was to build a station atop one of the mountain peaks. This occasionally left stations with a distant mountaintop (or its nearest small crossroads) as the historical city of license, even though the audience was elsewhere.

Broadcaster	City	Community of license	Comments
WPTZ 5 NBC	Plattsburgh	North Pole, New York	WPTZ was originally licensed in 1954 to North Pole, New York, the closest tiny crossroads to its mountaintop transmitter site near Lake Placid/Adirondack State Park. The station then used "North Pole–Plattsburgh–Burlington" or even "Montreal" as part of its on-air identity but the community of license, once chosen, is not easily modified. The station moved its transmitter to Mount Mansfield, Vermont, in the digital age to centralize its signal with the rest of the market's stations licensed east of Lake Champlain, and in January 2011, the city of license was authorized to become Plattsburgh. In 2019, the station relocated their main studios to South Burlington, Vermont, keeping a relocated and downsized news bureau and backup facility in Plattsburgh.

=== The relocation of an existing station ===
Often, a license for a new station will not be available in a community, either because a regulatory agency was only willing to accept new applications within specified narrow timeframes or because there are no suitable vacant channels. A prospective broadcaster must therefore buy an existing station as the only way to readily enter the market, in some cases being left with a station in a suburban, outlying or adjacent-market area if that were the only facility available for sale.

Broadcaster	City	Community of license	Comments
CHRO-TV	Ottawa	Pembroke	Launched in the small city of Pembroke in 1961, the station struggled for financial viability until gaining carriage on cable systems in Ottawa and adding a news bureau there — but because it was affiliated with television networks that already had other affiliates in Ottawa proper, it was restricted to cable distribution. It was eventually acquired by CHUM Limited in 1997, and added an over-the-air transmitter in Ottawa after joining CHUM's NewNet system. CHUM subsequently centralized the station's operations and studios in Ottawa. The Ottawa transmitter is 1080i 16:9 digital widescreen and, on paper at least, purports to be rebroadcasting CHRO (VHF 5, a standard-definition analog station) from Pembroke. Technically, this is an impossibility — legally, however, the Pembroke transmitter is still the primary station.
CHSC	Toronto	St. Catharines	After going into bankruptcy in 2002, the station was acquired by Pellpropco, a company which repurposed the station as a multilingual station aimed at the sizable Italian Canadian community in Toronto. After numerous additional license violations over the next number of years, the CRTC revoked the station's license in 2010.
CBAT-DT	Fredericton	Saint John	Originally a private CBC Television affiliate with the call sign CHSJ-TV, the station became the CBC affiliate for the entire province after CKCW-TV in Moncton, the province's only other television station at the time, switched to CTV in 1969. Although CHSJ remained licensed to Saint John, some of the station's programming was produced in Fredericton due to that city's status as the provincial capital. The station was fully relocated to Fredericton in 1994 after becoming a fully owned-and-operated station of the network. The station's transmitter remained on-the-air in its original location until its 2012 analogue shutdown, but its Fredericton digital successor never reached the city, leaving no watchable over-the-air CBC television in Saint John. Only a limited amount of OTA TV from private broadcasters remains.
KTVX 8 ABC	Tulsa	Muskogee, Oklahoma	ABC was a distant third-place network with limited resources which struggled through much of the 1950s. (Note: Much of the early content was sponsor-controlled, created by ad agencies or produced on a low budget. ABC TV (US) likely only survived the 1950s due to an injection of equity from United Paramount Theatres and because of the demise of the fourth-ranked DuMont Television Network. See http://uhfhistory.com/documents/Silverman_Thesis_ABC.pdf for an overview.) By 1952, only 27 of the top 50 US markets had three or more VHF TV stations. Much like other two-station markets, the two commercial Tulsa VHF stations carried CBS (KOTV 6) and NBC (KJRH-TV 2). ABC appeared briefly on UHF (KCEB 23 failed in its first year) before landing on this outlying station in Muskogee. KTVX (now KTUL (Note: At the time, TV 8 Muskogee couldn't share the same base callsign as KTUL radio unless they had the same owner and same community of licence. This restriction, which no longer exists in the US, affected many other established radio broadcasters who'd looked elsewhere for an outlying VHF TV slot, including WHYY/WUHY Wilmington/Philadelphia and WCNY/WWNY Carthage/Watertown.)) obtained FCC approval in 1957 to move to Lookout Mountain, KCEB's former site in Tulsa, by claiming that Muskogee was too small to support a commercial television station. Its owner at the time, KTUL radio, was already well-established in Tulsa. It would be 1999 before Muskogee got another station of its own, CW affiliate KQCW 19.
KNTV 11 NBC	San Francisco	San Jose, California	NBC programming traditionally had been carried by KRON-TV 4, a San Francisco affiliate which NBC had unsuccessfully attempted to purchase outright (or purchase another station) several times since its 1949 establishment by the Chronicle Publishing Company, including a failed $750 million deal in 1999 when the heirs of the Chronicle decided to divest their assets. Outbid by Young Broadcasting, NBC attempted to force the new owners to rebrand the station as "NBC 4" and restrict the station's ability to schedule its programming differently from the main network, which Young refused to do. NBC purchased the San Jose station for $230 million in 2001, moving their network programming on January 1, 2002, and relocating KNTV's transmitters to San Bruno Mountain on September 12, 2005, over KRON's objections. The station's license and newly built studios remain in San Jose and the station has well-lapped KRON-TV, now a CW station, which shares a building with ABC's KGO-TV, though no personnel.
WPKD-TV 19 Independent	Pittsburgh	Jeannette, Pennsylvania	Originally a Johnstown station, one of the rare instances in which the community of license for an existing channel has successfully been changed. WPKD-TV (then WTWB) managed to circumvent an FCC moratorium on new channel allocations in Pittsburgh by listing Jeannette, a small community of 11,000 people technically in the Pittsburgh market area, as the new city of license for an existing station. Effectively a flag of convenience, this maneuver portrays the station's owners as moving it from a community that had at least two other broadcasters (Johnstown) to one that had none (Jeannette) - easier to justify for regulatory purposes. The actual intended target market, Pittsburgh, already has many local stations. While the transmitter remains in Jennerstown (a small borough near Johnstown) and is inadequate to properly cover Pittsburgh over-the-air, this nominal community of license in the Pittsburgh market confers "must-carry" status for Pittsburgh's cable TV systems. Studios are at KDKA-TV Pittsburgh and city-grade coverage for Pittsburgh itself is supplied by a UHF repeater. The main transmitters never were moved, and soon after taking a license to serve Jeannette the station applied for must-carry on cable in Johnstown, its former community of license. No physical connection of this station with the small community of Jeannette has ever existed except as a very clever legal fiction. The station's old WPCW call sign was marketed using the slogan "Pittsburgh's CW", and has filed two construction permit applications to base a future digital transmitter within Allegheny County that would still give Jeannette a decent signal. Its current calls as an independent station mentions Pittsburgh's initial, along with emulating KDKA's calls partially to further muddle the station's actual city.
WPWR-TV 50 MyNetworkTV	Chicago	Gary, Indiana	WPWR operates from Chicago studios, transmitting from the Willis Tower (formerly known as the Sears Tower), but is licensed out-of-state. Its owners obtained this channel allocation by first buying an existing construction permit for a Gary, Indiana, station which had been licensed as Channel 56 but never built, then swapping its channel allocations with WYIN—a PBS member station also licensed to Gary, Indiana (WPWR itself had originally started as a shared time operation on channel 60 with WXFT-DT). WYIN had been refused a Sears Tower transmitter location as Chicago had two locally licensed PBS member stations before 2017.
WPXE 55 ION	Milwaukee	Kenosha, Wisconsin	A station which came on the air in 1988 as an affiliate of the religious LeSEA network with low penetration into the general Milwaukee area and some local programming for Kenosha mixed within the general LeSEA schedule, WHKE (as it was known at the time) was purchased in 1995 by Paxson Communications to become the eventual Milwaukee station for the PAX network due to that network's strategy of buying low-rated outlying stations to quickly launch their network, and since then the station has drifted continuously north of their city of license. The station's analog tower was actually located in north-central Racine County, just close enough to serve the northern reaches of the Milwaukee area and still provide a city grade signal to Kenosha. The station has no Kenosha facilities and before the 2021 purchase of their parent company by the E. W. Scripps Company, had their office in a small office suite the northern Milwaukee suburb of Glendale, with its engineering often coming from a rotating employee also engineering other Ion stations across the Upper Midwest; the Glendale studio also served as the studio for Wausau area station WTPX-TV. Since then, its engineering operations have been consolidated with Scripps NBC affiliate WTMJ-TV, though it still maintains a separate transmitting tower from WTMJ, At the same time with the 2019 repeal of the Main Studio Rule, it (and many of its sister Ion stations, including WTPX) share a technical 'studio facility' based within Cincinnati's Scripps Center, though all of its operations outside of over-the-air signal transmission are based out of Ion's West Palm Beach, Florida, headquarters, with WTMJ promoting subchannel availability of WPXE's networks occasionally, along with Summer Olympic year broadcasts of Green Bay Packers preseason football on WPXE's main channel. As of 2022, the only sign of WPXE's locality is WTMJ's engineer resolving transmitter and satellite faults, a local mailing address at WTMJ's Radio City studio, and its inclusion in WTMJ's retransmission consent negotiations.
WTVE 51 Paid programming	Philadelphia	Reading, now Willow Grove	An outlying UHF station which barely reached Philadelphia despite applying for ever-increasing amounts of power, WTVE had always been close to going off the air serving only Reading with various shopping and religious networks, along with a short-lived Telemundo affiliation. Instead of building one main digital transmitter, WTVE constructed a distributed transmission system composed nominally of eight co-channel transmitters in Reading, Bethlehem, North East MD, Quarryville, Myerstown, Lambertville, Philadelphia and Brockton for a combined total of 136.67kW of digital TV. As the bulk of this power (126 kW) was assigned to the Philadelphia transmitter, this configuration was effectively a full-power Philadelphia station with a series of small low-power on-channel boosters covering the original service area and city of license. (Reading itself got 760 watts.) After the repack, it signed a channel-sharing agreement with a smaller lower-power station, was able to move its COL to Willow Grove, and transmit from Philadelphia's Roxbourough tower site, then turned off the DTS system. WTVE and its channel-sharing partner were soon purchased by WRNN-TV Associates, which has controversially only bought stations for their must-carry rights with no interest in running them traditionally, and currently runs a schedule dominated by paid programming on WTVE.
WVEA-TV 62 Univisión (moved to channel 50)	Tampa	Venice, Florida	A Spanish-language station licensed to Venice, a community nearly 60 miles away from its Tampa studios and nearly 55 miles away from its Riverview transmitter site, in a Tampa suburb. WVEA originally was an unprofitable English-language independent WBSV, which served the Sarasota / Bradenton / Venice area. In 2000, Entravision acquired WBSV and in 2001 moved the transmitter from Venice to Riverview, increasing transmitter power and adopting its current Spanish-language « ¡vea! » identity (meaning "I see"). Prior to the move, WVEA's programming was seen on a low-powered channel in Tampa.
WWOR-TV 9 MyNetworkTV	New York City	Secaucus, New Jersey	New York City's Channel 9, then having the call sign WOR-TV in 1983, was at that time owned by RKO General. Due to misconduct in its operations, RKO General was threatened with loss of its license to operate many of its broadcast stations, including WOR. RKO convinced New Jersey Senator Bill Bradley to introduce a bill in Congress guaranteeing an automatic renewal of a station's license if it moved to a state that did not have a VHF commercial television station under a claim of 'underservement'. Under that very specific criteria, only New Jersey and Delaware met those requirements (both states being dually served by stations from New York or Philadelphia). With the bill passed and signed by Ronald Reagan, WOR relocated the station's operations to a business park in their new city of license, Secaucus (located directly across the Hudson River from Manhattan), and obtained an automatic license renewal, though their transmission facilities remained atop the World Trade Center in Manhattan and requirements for the station to properly serve New Jersey, an issue that has continued to affect WWOR's operations to the present day (their last license renewal was delayed by several years due to FCC claims it did not fulfill this directive). The 2018 repeal of the Main Studio Rule by the FCC ended the requirement by current WWOR owner Fox Television Stations to maintain any physical presence in their city of license of Secaucus, and the station's operations were merged into that of sister Fox flagship WNYW by 2019 in Manhattan, with the former New Jersey studios being decommissioned and sold off as of June 2019.
WBTS-CD 15 (formerly WYCN-CD) NBC	Boston	Nashua, New Hampshire	The newest example in this list, this was a result of the FCC's 2016 spectrum auction to reallocate television spectrum for the use of wireless devices. WYCN was previously a low-power community station serving Nashua carrying low-interest networks out of primetime, but was purchased by OTA Broadcasting in 2013, a company that mainly purchased stations to profit from their spectrum rather than a genuine interest in broadcasting. OTA won $80.4 million from the FCC for returning its spectrum, but also decided to retain the station's license for a channel sharing arrangement with another station, of which it had perfect timing; NBCUniversal was looking for both a full-market station and a way to broadcast their "NBC Boston" service (originating on equally low-power WBTS-LD) after their 2017 disaffiliation from WHDH. OTA, NBC, and the WGBH Educational Foundation then made an arrangement where WYCN would be purchased from OTA by NBC's O&O group, and WGBH would arrange to share their spectrum on secondary PBS member station WGBX-TV, allowing NBC a full-market and central home for their NBC and Cozi TV programming in Boston on their signal, using the license of what is in technicality a low-power station in the far western portion of the market. The station thus moved on January 18, 2018, from transmitting a low-power signal only serving Nashua, to a full-power signal transmitting 32 miles (51 km) away in Needham, Massachusetts, with NBC programming, sports and Boston news replacing the repeat-heavy Heroes & Icons network. In the summer of 2019 NBC coordinated a callsign swap between the two stations which made the now-WBTS-CD de facto full-power signal the main station in the NBC Boston service; the current WYCN-CD has since undergone a transmitter move and re-licensing to Providence, Rhode Island, eventually revealed to be an extension of WBTS-CD's sister station, Telemundo O&O WNEU (channel 60) into Providence as a satellite station; WNEU itself is licensed to Merrimack, New Hampshire, which moved its transmitter over thirty years from New Hampshire into the core of Greater Boston.

=== The border blaster ===
Occasionally, a community on an international border is served using a station licensed to another country. This may provide access to less restrictive broadcast regulation or represent a means to use local marketing agreements or adjacent-market licenses to circumvent limits on the number of stations under common ownership.

Broadcaster	City	Community of license	Comments
WTOR AM 770	Toronto	Youngstown, New York	WTOR airs a multicultural format aimed primarily at listeners in the Greater Toronto Area in Canada, rather than in its home state of New York. The station uses a highly directional transmitter array, aimed so strongly at Toronto that parts of Michigan can receive the station even though it is barely audible in Buffalo, just 20 miles south of its transmitter. Outside the minimum skeleton crew to fulfill the FCC-required engineer and general manager duties at its transmitter site and 'main studio' in Ransomville, New York, and a majority American 'owner' to avoid foreign agent rules, all the station's staff and programming originate from the Toronto suburb of Mississauga.
KVRI AM 1600	Vancouver	Blaine, Washington	A Punjabi language radio station licensed to the border town of Blaine, Washington. Owned by Multicultural Broadcasting, the station has a local marketing agreement with Radio India. Studios are located in Surrey, British Columbia.
WLYK FM 102.7	Kingston	Cape Vincent, New York	A south-of-the-border station licensed to a tiny border village of 760 people. Owned by US-based Border International Broadcasting, but operated through a local marketing agreement from the Kingston (Williamsville) studios of Rogers-owned CIKR-FM (K-Rock 105.7). Primary audience is Kingston, Ontario, population 132,485. The use of a foreign station circumvents Canada's limit on common ownership (two stations per-band in the same language, same market) and the Canadian content requirements which would apply to a domestic station. Canada does regulate shared-service and local marketing agreements (where one company nominally owns a station and has someone else operate it) but WLYK legally is not a Canadian station.
XETV-TDT 6 Canal 5	San Diego	Tijuana, Baja California	Mexican-owned station, fed from a San Diego–based studio. San Diego (channels 8 and 10), Los Angeles (channels 2, 4, 5, 7, 9, 11, and 13) and Santa Barbara (channel 3) had already been allocated as early as 1952, with the remaining pair of VHF channels (6 and 12) allocated to Tijuana by Mexican authorities. The only means to add a third VHF TV broadcaster to San Diego without unacceptable interference was therefore to enter a local marketing agreement with Mexican-owned Televisa. The station, which carried ABC from 1956 to 1973, was a charter Fox affiliate until 2008, when San Diego-licensed KSWB-TV took over the affiliation. The digital age allowed XETV to affiliate with Televisa's Canal 5 network using their DT2 signal, and for over a year until it was signed off in mid-July 2013, the analog signal carried Canal 5, made XETV the only North American station at the time to carry both an American-originated and Mexican-originated network on their signal. The station lost its affiliation to the CW after failing to reach an agreement with the network, which later switched to KFMB-DT2 and shut down its news operation. It ended English-language programming on May 31, 2017, with Canal 5 programming moving to 6.1 (and retaining that channel number due to adjacent-market channel conflicts with KTLA, one of only a few channel conflicts between Mexico and the United States; KSWB also brands by its cable position of channel 5 rather than its virtual channel 69).
XHAS-TDT 33	San Diego	Tijuana, Baja California	A Spanish language broadcaster licensed to Tijuana, Mexico, this station is fed from studios in San Diego, US. The same US-based facilities also formerly fed English language XHDTV-TV (My 49, Tecate, Baja California) until it itself switched to carrying Milenio Television in September 2018. The station was formerly a Telemundo affiliate until June 30, 2017, after NBC, which owns KNSD in San Diego, announced plans to create a Telemundo O&O station. Telemundo programming was later moved to the recently acquired KUAN-LD where it has been a Telemundo O&O station since 2017. Grupo Intermedia took over programming the station at the end of 2022 with the oncoming end of the Azteca América network XHAS carried between 2017 and 2022, which was largely a duplicative non-factor in a market with easy availability of the domestic TV Azteca networks.
XHITZ-FM 90.3	San Diego	Tijuana, Mexico	Local Media San Diego holds a programming and local marketing agreement with Mexican XHITZ, XETRA-FM (91.1) and XHRM-FM (92.5), delivering programming from San Diego studios across the U.S.-Mexico border, with XHITZ and XERTA on a portion of the FM band otherwise reserved for non-commercial educational stations across the border.
XHRIO-TV 15 (formerly 2, and formerly Fox/The CW)	Rio Grande Valley, Texas	Matamoros, Tamaulipas, Mexico	Like the former CW affiliate XETV, CW 15 Rio-Grande formerly broadcast news via a Mexican-owned station fed from a US-based studio. It is a sister station of KNVO-DT3, a subchannel of an Entravision-owned Spanish language Univisión station licensed to McAllen, Texas. It formerly broadcast Telemundo, UPN, Fox, and MundoFox/MundoMax programming, then shifted to The CW; in 2017 it switched to PSIP channel 15 due to Mexico's national remapping of channels, including channel 2 to the Las Estrellas network. The station left the air at the end of 2021, after letting its concession on the station expire without renewal.
WQLR 94.7	Montreal	Chateaugay, New York	The station features the national K-LOVE network of Christian contemporary music serving a larger city on the Canadian side of the border from a city on the U.S. border, a format traditionally rarely heard in Canada outside border areas. Its city-grade signal reaches the southwestern parts of Greater Montreal, other parts of southwestern Quebec, and Cornwall, Ontario, along with Malone and Massena on the New York side of the border. Its class C2 signal reaches much of Montreal proper, and even some of its northern suburbs such as Laval. Before its sale to K-LOVE's holding company in 2021, the station had studios located in Pointe-Claire, Quebec, a southern inner suburb.
KVOS 12 Univision	Vancouver/Seattle	Bellingham, Washington	Based in Bellingham, a city that was considered far too small to support a television station on its own, for much of its history the station actively targeted the much larger metropolitan Vancouver market in Canada; in fact, when the station launched in 1953 it was the first television station available over the air in the Vancouver market at all, as television was just being introduced to Canada and CBUT-DT did not launch until about six months later. Its debut broadcast on its very first day of operations was a kinescope of the Coronation of Elizabeth II, an event of much greater relevance to Vancouver than to Bellingham. In later years the station launched a production office in the Vancouver suburb of Burnaby, and for some time it was actually spending more money on Canadian television production than any Canadian media company but the Canadian Broadcasting Corporation. This ended in the 1970s, with the advent of Canadian content regulations in broadcasting and a change in Canadian tax regulation by which Canadian companies could no longer use advertising purchased on non-Canadian broadcast stations as a tax deduction. The station also later carried some programming syndicated from the Canadian Citytv network, which did not yet have a station in Vancouver. Despite the tax changes, the station continued to face claims that it was "draining" advertising revenue from the Vancouver stations, most notably in the CRTC hearings on the licensing of Vancouver's CIVT-DT in 1996; the station finally lost much of its remaining market share in the Vancouver market following the 2001 Vancouver TV realignment, both being bumped from its position on the cable dial in Vancouver to make space for the new CIVI-DT and losing Citytv as a programming source due to that network's acquisition of CKVU-DT. Currently it is owned by Weigel Broadcasting with Seattle station KFFV, with both stations broadcasting the company's six digital broadcast networks in tandem across the Seattle market. In 2024, it began to carry the Spanish-language network Univision mainly for the Seattle area after a station in Seattle, KUNS-TV, ended their affiliation to become a CW affiliate, bringing the network over-the-air into Canada for the first time and conflicting with Univision's domestic Univision Canada cable channel, becoming an example of both a border blaster and a last-available frequency for Univision (which prefers main channel carriage to any subchannel arrangements nationwide).
KCND-TV 12 Ind.	Winnipeg	Pembina, North Dakota	Until the 1970s, KCND was a tiny originating station in a just-as-tiny town on the Manitoba-North Dakota border. Its programming largely targeted Winnipeg, the largest community in the region. Ultimately, the CRTC gave Izzy Asper's Canwest the CKND-TV 9 Winnipeg licence in return for his acquiring the non-licence assets of KCND-TV (which he can not legally operate, being Canadian) and taking it off the air. Canwest went on to operate as the Global Television Network until it was broken up in a 2010 bankruptcy, with the television stations sold to Shaw Media and the Southam newspaper chain sold to venture capitalists as Postmedia. The VHF 12 Pembina frequency is still in use as KNRR, a full-power rebroadcaster of Fox affiliate KVRR, but is not carried by any Winnipeg-area cable system.

=== The last-available frequency allocation ===
In the early days of television, the majority of stations could be found on the VHF band; in North America, this currently represents just twelve possible channels and in large markets any suitable allocations in this range were mostly full by the early 1950s. Occasionally, a prospective broadcaster could obtain one of these coveted positions by acquiring an existing station or permit in an adjacent community - although in some cases this meant a move out-of-state.

Broadcaster	City	Community of license	Comments
WCTV 6 CBS	Tallahassee	Thomasville, Georgia	First broadcast in 1955 from a studio in Tallahassee, but was licensed to Thomasville using a transmitter in Metcalf, Georgia. The FCC had allocated only one VHF channel to Tallahassee, which was already in use by Florida State University's noncommercial WFSU-TV 11. Bainbridge, Georgia-licensed WTLH CW 49 also transmits from tiny Metcalf, a community on the state line; this compromise location attempts to reach both Valdosta, Georgia (45 mi) and Tallahassee (25 mi). Its callsign references TLH, IATA's airport code for Tallahassee International Airport.
WHYY-TV 12 PBS	Philadelphia	Wilmington, Delaware	Originally licensed in 1957 as channel 35 Philadelphia. In an era where TV manufacturers were not required to provide UHF tuners, few could receive the station. When WVUE 12 Wilmington went off the air in 1958, WHYY applied to serve Wilmington as channel 12 was the nearest available VHF allocation.
WNET 13 PBS	New York	Newark, New Jersey	One of the victims of the September 11 attacks. WNET broadcast from a shared master antenna atop the World Trade Center. Its community of license remains at Newark because the only means to acquire scarce VHF-TV spectrum in New York City in 1961 was to purchase existing Newark independent WATV. An on-air identifying logo displays initially as "WNET Newark, New Jersey", then transitions to "WNET New York"; the station provides New Jersey local public-affairs coverage through its co-operated sister network for that state, NJTV. The studios are in New York City; the transmitters have moved back from the Empire State Building to 1 World Trade Center, joining other New Jersey licensees including WWOR-TV 9 Secaucus and WNJU 47 Linden.

=== The new entrant ===
A new network or station group will often enter a market after all of the most valuable available frequencies (such as the analogue VHF TV assignments in major cities) are already taken. This often results in building a network by constructing outlying stations, UHF stations, underpowered stations or some mix of all three. That can leave transmitters licensed to some very strange or tiny places. This happened to some degree with networks which signed on in the 1960s, such as National Educational Television in the US or the CTV Television Network in Canada. Later entrants fared worse.

In the U.S., PAX Network (now Ion Television) was prone to this, building a network largely from outlying owned-and-operated UHF stations.

In Canada, third networks such as Global were often a motley collection of outlying stations in their early years. CKGN-TV, Ontario's original "Global Television Network" repeater chain, signed on in 1974 in an already densely packed stretch of the beaten-path Windsor-Quebec corridor in which few desirable channels were available. Cities such as Windsor, London, Toronto, Peterborough, Kingston and Cornwall (Note: Canada's broadcast regulator allows existing broadcasters in a market to oppose applications from new entrants if the competition would harm the existing station. Any attempt to locate in Kingston would likely be opposed by that city's lone originating station. CIII-TV never got a Cornwall transmitter as that city is in the Montréal market, which was subject to a moratorium on new entrants at the time.) are notable by their absence from the network's original roster. The five transmitters on-air in 1984 (after a decade of operation as a struggling "third network") were:

- Sarnia transmitting from Oil Springs on UHF 29 (370kW)
- Paris on VHF 6 (at the full 100kW, the most allocated to a station of this class in Ontario)
- Uxbridge on UHF 22 (at the full 5000kW, the most powerful in the nation, but on an undesirable suburban UHF allocation nowhere near downtown Toronto)
- Bancroft on VHF 2 (at 87kW - and later increased to the full 100kW, but in the speck-on-a-map unincorporated hamlet of Vennachar, near Denbigh).
- Ottawa on VHF 6 (at one-eighth the typical power for a station in its class, and on a sharp directional pattern focussed on Ottawa). This station had to protect CBMT (VHF 6, CBC Montréal) less than 120 miles distant - and this at a time when full-power VHF TV co-channel stations were typically spaced 175-200 miles (280-320km) apart to prevent interference.

The majority of these transmitters were not licensed to the primary community served. Many were underpowered, short-spaced or in undesirable locations - often just putting enough signal into key communities to obtain cable must-carry protection. As the only transmitters to be operating on then-valuable VHF channels at anything other than greatly reduced power were licensed to Paris and Bancroft, both awkward outlying communities, the Paris transmitter was arbitrarily listed as the main station for the entire network.

=== The cable or digital TV placeholder ===
Sometimes, putting a usable over-the-air signal into the primary community served is anywhere from second-priority to not a priority at all. A station could be barely within the market's boundaries or be underpowered to the point of putting a "B" grade signal into the community at best. On anything less than a huge rooftop antenna, the station is unwatchable — but, even if the underlying over-the-air signal was not valuable, the corresponding cable television slots in the various communities it was almost serving were. Any full-service domestic signal above some arbitrary minimum had access to "must carry" protection, could request favourable placement on the dial and (in Canada) could engage in signal substitution to take ad revenue from other stations already carrying the same content.

The 2016-2020 OTA TV repack opened additional possibilities for using an outlying community's licence as an over-the-air placeholder. Buy a station, return the licensed broadcast spectrum to the government, then claim to be "sharing" a channel with another broadcaster by using the orphan licence to place content on one of their digital subchannels. Suddenly, an outlying commercial low-power station in New Hampshire is "sharing" space on WGBX, a full-power non-commercial station in the heart of the Boston market. The same transmitter can, by using two different licences in a "channel sharing" arrangement, have two different communities of licence - which may allow more flexibility for its location. It is also possible to mix commercial and non-commercial licences. In Canada, where CRTC regulations prevent carrying any additional, unique programming on digital subchannels without obtaining a second licence (and taking all the obligations which go with it) for each subchannel, returning just the spectrum (and keeping the licence) can be used as a means to recycle licences from abandoned, defunct outlying stations for use elsewhere in the network.

Broadcaster	City	Community of license	Comments
CIII-TV-2	Kingston	Bancroft, Ontario	One of the original six CKGN-TV transmitters from the initial net signon, claiming to be a fledgling Global Television Network, in 1974. VHF 2 could not be assigned at Kingston (to protect WKTV Utica and CBFT Montréal) or Toronto (market-adjacent to WGRZ Buffalo) but could be built near tiny Denbigh, from which it would barely reach a long list of communities from Kingston to Pembroke to Peterborough. (Note: Using the B-grade contour of a full-power low-VHF analogue station to rimshot multiple communities creates a problem due to the digital television transition. The digital signal typically cannot replicate the original analogue low-VHF coverage area. The communities which the station "almost" reached in analogue will not be reached at all. Hence the temptation to not convert a station like CIII-TV-2, to defer its conversion through administrative means, relocate it or take it dark.) The licence is at Bancroft, some 35 miles (55 km) further distant, as the closest incorporated town of any real size. The network's current owner, Corus, owns CHEX/CKWS and has moved Global's programming there, rendering Bancroft redundant, duplicative and superfluous — but wants to keep the desirable "cable 3" allocation which CIII-TV-2 held in a long list of "rimshot" communities. They intend to do so by using Bancroft's licence to operate a digital subchannel on a station which does not reach Bancroft. That will leave the same network running two different O&O's with the same content on different subchannels of the same transmitter, in a market which has already lost most of its Canadian OTA TV (CBC, SRC, TVO, CTV) and is only still viable for OTA due to cross-border reception of Watertown locals.
CKWS-DT-2	Ottawa	Prescott, Ontario	CKWS-TV was a CBC TV affiliate in Kingston, Ontario, from its 1954 inception until the network dumped its affiliate stations in 2015. It used to be carried on CATV systems as far north as Ottawa and as far south as Utica, New York. When the Ottawa cable system dropped CKWS to make room for more speciality channels, station management realised that many of the cable systems which carried CKWS 11 were under no obligation to do so. Fearful of being dropped from cable in additional communities, they established three underpowered UHF rebroadcasters (26 Prescott, 36 Smiths Falls, 66 Brighton); as Canada licences rebroadcasters as full-power stations, these had must-carry status everywhere from Brockville to Belleville. Corus Entertainment, which has owned CHEX/CKWS since the turn of the millennium, acquired third-ranked Global Television Network from Shaw (a company under common control) in 2016, making the stations Global O&O's in 2018. The tiny 130-watt Prescott-licensed digital UHF transmitter in Spencerville is not valuable to the network, but the associated cable "must carry" status is - especially if the licence can be used to operate a digital subchannel on the commonly owned Ottawa repeater CIII-DT-6 and reach the larger market. Gatineau is Vidéotron territory and that company's proprietor Quebecor has obtained CRTC permission to not carry CKWS-TV (Note: The dealings between Quebecor and rival CKWS TV are complex. Parent station CKWS-DT 11 was supposed to move to DT13 to protect Télé-Métropole, TVA's flagship French-language Montréal station, once that station is repacked from DT10 to DT11. In an unusual move (given the long history of Kingston-market VHF being pushed west/northwest to outlying communities to protect Montreal stations) the CRTC allowed CKWS to stay on DT11 and dump a limited amount of co-channel interference on the TVA owned-and-operated flagship. Québécor owns both Vidéotron cable and the TVA network, which may explain their desire not to carry CKWS-DT-2 on Vidéotron in Gatineau. The station that CKWS-TV claims to be trying to protect by staying on DT11? WNYI, a satellite-fed repeater of Daystar which rebroadcasts brokered religious programming and originates nothing, but which nominally holds a full-service VHF TV license. As one further wrinkle, leaving CKWS-DT on 11 means that commonly owned-and-operated CIII-TV-2 Bancroft cannot go digital as its assigned repack channel was DT11. Instead, it will go dark; its licence will be assigned to a digital subchannel on CKWS's Wolfe Island, Ontario, transmitter... which does not reach Bancroft over-the-air.) - but nothing precludes Corus from using CKWS-DT-2's licence and a digital subchannel on the Ottawa transmitter to attempt to get back on Rogers Cable on the Ontario side of Ottawa.
WNYI 52 Univisión, now Daystar	Syracuse	Ithaca, New York	WNYI, which should itself focus on Ithaca, the home of Cornell University, instead has been used to provide another network to the larger Syracuse market with little success. Launched by Equity Media Holdings as a Univision affiliate, it had no local programming and was centralcast out of Equity's hub in Little Rock, Arkansas, with the only local contributions being limited local advertising. As Time Warner Cable already carried Univision's national cable feed and held local insertion rights for advertising over it, it had little incentive to carry WNYI, whose signal range was not city-grade into Syracuse, thus must-carry rights could not be invoked. WNYI also suffered from constant technical issues which could take weeks to repair as Equity maintained no local engineers or staff in their markets, earning the ire of the few providers who could receive it over the air, Univision, whose carriage was never fully assured and who dealt with Equity affiliates like WNYI who had no local presence whatsoever, the station's few local advertisers, who might not see their commercials carried at all due to a transmitter or computer issue (as often Equity's systems would accidentally carry commercials from a market far out-of-state), and viewers of those systems. Those providers eventually resorted to acquiring the signal of Equity stations through the same satellite feeds Equity used to feed the transmitters. As many of Equity's full-power stations in the 2000s signed on too late to receive a digital companion channel and the company chose to launch with analog signals rather than choosing to launch as all-digital despite their known short life in the former format, they were forced to flash-cut to digital or go dark in 2009. Equity went bankrupt that year, at the height of the Great Recession, having never flash-cut WNYI to digital. The station was sold in a bankruptcy sale with several others. Daystar, the new owner, had to build out the digital facilities themselves or forfeit the license after one year dark. Daystar also launched a translator, WDSS-LD, which served Syracuse itself. Eventually, it used the spectrum auction to build out a full-power transmitter from Moravia which transmits both WNYI and WDSS-LD, gaining must-carry rights. As with Equity, there has never been a local staff under Daystar ownership. As Daystar features a default national schedule and does not solicit advertising, there is no local content on the station.

=== The use of an adjacent market ===
Occasionally, a station owner would reach a legal limit on concentration of media ownership, already having the maximum number of commonly owned stations in a market. Additional stations would be possible by transmitting the extra signals from a station technically in an adjacent market.

Broadcaster	City	Community of license	Comments
CKBY-FM 101.1	Ottawa	Smiths Falls	As station owner Rogers Communications already has multiple stations licensed to Ottawa, limits on concentration of media ownership restrict it from moving additional stations into that city. The city of license has therefore remained at Smiths Falls, a small town of roughly 80 km distant, and the station was absent from the (now-defunct) Ottawa-Hull digital radio cluster as that signal would not reach the community of license. Despite this the station effectively acts as an adjunct to the Ottawa radio market, and has undergone frequent format, branding and call sign changes based on market conditions in Ottawa. (Note: As Smiths Falls, Ontario, is legally not in the Ottawa radio market, attempts by the Smiths Falls station to oppose proposed format changes by its Ottawa rivals have been rejected by the CRTC; likewise, any attempts by the Ottawa stations to oppose format changes in Smiths Falls have by this precedent also been dismissed - a situation which favours the Smiths Falls broadcaster by giving it added autonomy it would not have had in the city.) Like its nominally Smiths Falls-licensed sibling CJET-FM, CKBY's transmitters are actually in Carleton Place, Ontario - roughly halfway from Smiths Falls to Ottawa.

=== The arbitrary nominal location ===
In some cases, stations were constructed or acquired with the express purpose of driving a regional or province-wide chain of full-power repeaters. (Note: Occasionally, individual stations in a full-power rebroadcaster chain will be licensed to outlying communities to ensure spacing which locates them to avoid unnecessary overlap with other stations in the same group.) Which of these "satellite stations" would be designated as the main signal could be an arbitrary choice, as the programming carried on all stations in the system would be identical.

Broadcaster	City	Community of license	Comments
CHLF-TV 39 TFO	Toronto	Hawkesbury	TFO (Télé-Française d'Ontario) was a repeater chain broadcasting the same signal in 17 cities and towns with large francophone communities as a sister service to the English-language TVOntario; it relied primarily on cable television for distribution in much of Ontario. Studios are in Toronto, the provincial capital, as TFO belongs to Ontario's government, although the station was never physically available over-the-air in that community. As such, the choice of which of the multiple repeaters to designate as the primary station was arbitrary; Hawkesbury was chosen because that signal crossed the Ontario-Quebec border into Montreal, Canada's largest francophone television market. After the 2012 digital switchover, the network became exclusive to cable and satellite as it was decided to shut down its transmitters rather than converting them to digital.
CIII-TV 6 Global	Toronto	Paris	From its launch in 1974 until 2009, this station's primary city of license was Paris, a small town near Brantford, although the main studios were located in Toronto. A chain of repeaters covering most of Ontario, the choice for the nominal primary station was an arbitrary one. A Greater Toronto Area community could have reasonably been chosen as nominal city of license, but to do so would be to name a suburban UHF outlet (22 Uxbridge) as the main station. Eventually UHF's perceived disadvantage was diminished by cable and the start of the digital era. Meanwhile, CIII-TV obtained a Toronto allocation (UHF 41) and took the outlying station dark (the UHF 22 allocation later went to CHEX-2 Durham, but at much less power (Note: CHEX-TV-2 had 5500 watts of analogue UHF, the digital signal is 185 watts - a tiny amount for what is nominally the only originating OTA TV station licensed to a beaten-path industrial city of more than 160,000 people. This tiny signal does, however, get CHEX a slot on digital cable in Toronto, the largest city in the nation.)). The station's Toronto rebroadcaster on channel 41 (CIII-TV-41) became the originating broadcaster legally as defined by the CRTC for the CIII/Global Ontario network in mid-2009.
CKMI-TV 20 Global	Montreal	Quebec City	Similarly, from the station's launch until 2009, Quebec was the city of license and Montreal 46 / Sherbrooke 11 merely repeaters constructed after acquisition of the existing Quebec station. As the studios, master control facilities and largest audience are in Montreal, and the number of anglophones in mostly francophone Quebec City is small, this was a Montreal station in all but name. Like its sister station CIII, the station's license was moved to Montreal in 2009.

== See also ==
- All-Channel Receiver Act
- Border blaster
- Rimshot (broadcasting)
- Duopoly (broadcasting), also known as a twinstick
- Flag of convenience (business)
