= WLOT-LP =

Television station in Watertown, New York

- Watertown, New York; United States
- Channels: Analog: 46 (UHF)

Programming
- Affiliations: UPN (1995–2002); Independent (2002−2005)

Ownership
- Owner: Anthony DiMarco; (NC Partners)

History
- Founded: December 9, 1993
- First air date: October 10, 1995
- Last air date: February 23, 2005
- Former call signs: W66CH (1995–1999)
- Former channel numbers: Analog: 66 (UHF, 1995–2001)
- Call sign meaning: Watertown, Lake Ontario, Thousand Islands

Technical information
- Licensing authority: FCC
- Facility ID: 70245
- Class: CA
- ERP: 19 kW
- Transmitter coordinates: 43°58′30″N 75°54′34″W
- Translator(s): WBQZ-LP 34 Watertown

Links
- Public license information: LMS

WLOT-LP (channel 46) was a low-power, Class A television station in Watertown, New York, United States. It was relayed on WBQZ-LP (channel 34) in the area to the northwest of Watertown. The stations were owned by Anthony DiMarco.

== History ==
=== Beginnings ===
Originally branded as "PS66", W66CH took the WLOT-LP callsign in November 1999 and launched a website (newmediacommunications.com, now defunct) in September 2000. As a UPN affiliate, the station pair was added to Time Warner Cable's Watertown lineup in July 2002.

The stations lost the UPN affiliation to WNYF-CA in October 2002, where it only was to be a secondary affiliation for the low-power Fox affiliate. The newly independent WLOT stations were dropped from cable soon thereafter, as the continuing cost to rent the "cable 97" slot from Time Warner proved prohibitive.

Both stations were listed for sale in January 2003, at one point appearing on eBay with a $950,000 asking price. An acquisition by Clear Channel Communications (now iHeartMedia) in September 2003 at a price of $180,000 ultimately fell through, leaving DiMarco to attempt to find individual investors to buy equity in the stations.

Clear Channel at that time owned ABC affiliate WWTI (channel 50), which was later owned by Newport Television and is now owned by Nexstar Media Group.

=== Demise ===
Station owner Anthony DiMarco suffered a fatal heart attack on February 23, 2005, at the age of 46. The stations shut down, although both licenses remained active.

On January 24, 2006, UPN and The WB announced their merger; their successor The CW is carried by Nexstar-owned WWTI-DT2, ending the historical association of UPN with any Watertown low-power TV station.

As with all television station licenses in the state of New York, WLOT's and WBQZ's licenses were to expire on June 1, 2007, and license renewal applications were due February 1, 2007. As of 2008, both stations' licenses were still active, according to FCC databases, despite the stations having been silent for far more than a year. The FCC had listed WLOT-LP 46 as licensed to NC Partners (as of 2010, neither the WLOT calls nor the local UHF TV 46 frequency are allocated to any licensed broadcaster) but continued to list WBQZ-LP 34 as licensed to Anthony DiMarcantonio. As of 2011, both licenses are defunct.

The question of who owned the stations was the subject of legal challenges. The courts never ruled on the matter before the licenses expired and the issue became moot.

The channel 46 frequency has never been reallocated. In 2016, SagamoreHill Broadcasting launched WVNC-LD on the adjacent channel 45 frequency instead.
