= WWTI =

Television station in Watertown, New York

Semi-satellite of WSYR-TV, Syracuse, New York
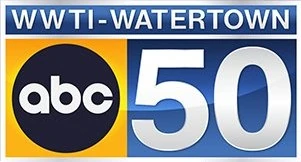

- Watertown, New York; United States
- Channels: Digital: 31 (UHF); Virtual: 50
- Branding: ABC 50; The North Country CW (50.2)

Programming
- Affiliations: 50.1: ABC; 50.2: CW+; for others, see § Subchannels

Ownership
- Owner: Nexstar Media Group; (Nexstar Media Inc.)

History
- First air date: January 3, 1988
- Former call signs: WJCK (1985–1986); WFYF (1986–1990)
- Former channel numbers: Analog: 50 (UHF, 1988–2009); Digital: 21 (UHF, 2003–2019); Translators: W25AB Watertown (1988–2000); W28BC Massena (1988–2000)
- Former affiliations: Both secondary: NBC (1988–1995); Fox (1988–2000)
- Call sign meaning: Wonderful Watertown, Thousand Islands

Technical information
- Licensing authority: FCC
- Facility ID: 16747
- ERP: 31.1 kW
- HAAT: 329.5 m (1,081 ft)
- Transmitter coordinates: 43°52′47″N 75°43′11″W

Links
- Public license information: Public file; LMS
- Website: www.informnny.com; "The North Country CW" (50.2)

WWTI (channel 50) is a television station in Watertown, New York, United States, affiliated with ABC and The CW Plus. Owned by Nexstar Media Group, the station maintains studios on Court Street in downtown Watertown, and its transmitter is located on Hayes Road in Denmark, New York.

Although identifying as a separate station in its own right, WWTI is considered a semi-satellite of WSYR-TV (channel 9) in Syracuse. WWTI clears all network programming as provided by its parent, simulcasts most of WSYR's newscasts and airs some of its syndicated programming (albeit at different times). There are some programs that only air on WWTI while some are only seen on WSYR. WWTI also airs separate station identifications and commercial inserts, and has its own website. Master control and some internal operations for WWTI and WSYR are based at Springfield, Massachusetts–licensed Nexstar sister station and NBC affiliate WWLP's studios in Chicopee.

== History ==
Former logo.

The station signed on January 3, 1988, as WFYF. Airing an analog signal on UHF channel 50 from studios at Stateway Plaza (with an Arsenal Street/NY 3 postal address) in the town of Watertown, it replaced a low-power translator of Utica's ABC affiliate WUTR previously on the allotment. The station was the third outlet established in Watertown after WWNY-TV and WNPE-TV (now WPBS-TV). Prior to WFYF's launch, WWNY was a secondary ABC affiliate and also served Massena and Malone along with WIXT-TV (now WSYR) from Syracuse.

At its sign-on, WFYF took over operation of repeater W25AB channel 25 in Massena to better serve the St. Lawrence River Valley. However, WVNY in Burlington, Vermont, eventually launched a translator (W60AF channel 60) of its own in Malone. WFYF also operated a second repeater (W25AB channel 25) in order to expand its reach in and around Watertown.

In addition to being an ABC affiliate from the start, it shared a secondary NBC affiliation with WWNY until 1995, and also shared a secondary Fox affiliation with WWNY. While the latter cleared more of NBC and/or Fox's programming offerings, WFYF aired NBC Sports' coverage of National Football League (NFL) games on Sunday afternoons, which lasted until 1995 when it began airing Fox Sports' NFL games (in addition to carrying Monday Night Football through ABC). Its original ownership team consisted of several investors including General Manager David James Alteri, Steven Fox, and Richard Kimball. After the station went bankrupt under the initial partnership, it was sold to Robert Smith of Smith Broadcasting in 1990 and the current call sign WWTI was adopted September 14. A new general manager, Shelly Markoff, took control of operations.

In 2000, the United Communications Corporation (then-owner of WWNY) entered into an agreement with Smith Broadcasting to make WWTI's repeaters (W28BC and W25AB) separate full-time Fox affiliates known together as WNYF. After a year of joint operation, United Communications took complete ownership of the two stations. The Ackerley Group purchased WWTI in 2000, reuniting channel 50 with former parent WUTR, at which point David Males, then General Sales Manager, was promoted to general manager. It joined Ackerley's cluster of New York stations with master control and other internal operations based out of centralcasting facilities at flagship WIXT in Syracuse. Clear Channel Communications would take control of the station with its purchase of Ackerley in 2001. On July 30, 2003, WWTI began broadcasting a digital signal on UHF channel 21.

On April 20, 2007, Clear Channel entered into an agreement to sell its entire television station unit to Newport Television (a subsidiary of private equity group Providence Equity Partners). Newport announced on July 19, 2012, that it would sell twelve of its stations, including WWTI, to the Nexstar Broadcasting Group. The deal once again reunited WWTI with WUTR, by then owned by Mission Broadcasting and operated by Nexstar, and also paired it with WUTR's virtual sisters WFXV and WPNY-LP. The transaction was completed on December 3.

On April 23, 2018, WWTI moved from its longtime home at Stateway Plaza to a centrally located site at the Top of the Square Plaza in downtown Watertown.

=== WWTI-DT2 ===
Its second WB logo.

In September 1998, an agreement between this station and Time Warner Cable allowed WWTI to launch cable-exclusive WB affiliate "WBWT". The arrangement was established during a period when The WB deployed various network stations outside the top 100 markets as cable-only channels. WWTI provided sales and promotional opportunities to "WBWT" which was originally on Time Warner Cable channel 31. Since it was a cable-exclusive outlet, the call sign was not officially recognized by the Federal Communications Commission (FCC). At some point in time, "WBWT" moved to the more appropriate channel 14, which resulted in its rebranding to "Watertown's WB 14".

On January 24, 2006, The WB and UPN announced the two networks would end broadcasting and merge. The new combined service would be called The CW. The letters would represent the first initial of corporate parents CBS (the parent company of UPN) and the Warner Bros. unit of Time Warner. Some of UPN's programming was seen in Watertown on WNYF in a secondary nature through a tape-delayed arrangement. On May 18, it was confirmed "WBWT" would be joining The CW via The CW Plus (a similar operation to The WB 100+). When the new network launched on September 18, WWTI created a second digital subchannel to offer non-cable viewers access to CW programming. "WBWT" dropped the faux call sign in favor of WWTI-DT2 which began to be used in an official manner. On August 17, 2012, it started broadcasting in HD. On March 4, 2013, WPTZ's second digital subchannel assumed the CW affiliation for the Plattsburgh–Burlington market. Since the main WPTZ channel is available on Charter Spectrum in Massena (along with WVNC-LD, the Watertown market's NBC affiliate), that area has access to two CW affiliates when WWTI-DT2 is included.

== News operation ==
For its entire existence, WWNY has held the number one spot in Nielsen ratings by a wide margin. It has been the dominant station in the North Country because the station had the market to itself until WWTI signed on. Even after this station began maintaining a minimal local news presence for many years, WWNY remained the most watched outlet. WWTI's original news team was quite small compared with other big three stations operating news departments. Its first attempt at airing newscasts and competing with WWNY ceased in early 1991. Four years later, a second attempt was established and the station maintained a small news team similar to the previous effort.

After the Ackerley Group acquired WWTI, it became more reliant on content originating from its sister stations in Upstate New York, particularly flagship WIXT in Syracuse. In July 2002, a two-hour weekday morning show called Daybreak debuted on this station. The broadcast, airing from 5 to 7 a.m., was simulcast on sister stations WIVT in Binghamton and WUTR in Utica. The newscast was produced by WIXT from a secondary set at its studios and included brief localized updates (focusing on Watertown) twice an hour. Most coverage, however, presented was regional in nature with area-wide weather forecasts.

Having never successfully competed with WWNY, WWTI's nightly NewsWatch 50 newscasts were canceled in 2004. For a short time afterward, the station featured a 24 Hour News Source-style series of short hourly news updates seen throughout the day. After this, it continued to air several daily news and weather updates under the NewsWatch 50 branding. In December 2006, WWTI added a news and weather update on weeknights called 5 at 5. On June 5, 2009, the station's news department was shut down completely after Newport Television implemented across the board cuts. At the same time, WIVT and WBGH-CA announced their Binghamton news operation would be consolidated with sister station WETM-TV in Elmira. This affected WWTI because it only maintained one locally based meteorologist and WIVT/WBGH provided all other weather forecasts seen on-air. On September 14, the station switched its branding to "ABC 50" and website from "newswatch50.com" to "myabc50.com" de-emphasizing local news.

Even though WWTI lost a Watertown-based news department, it began simulcasting WSYR's NewsChannel 9 Eleven at 11 every night through a news share agreement. During the 2009–2010 NFL season, the station featured half-hour reports from the Buffalo Bills training camp produced by sister station WHAM-TV in Rochester. On September 8, 2009, WWTI began simulcasting WSYR's weekday morning and nightly 6 o'clock newscasts. Although that station eventually expanded its weekday morning show to 4:30, the first half hour is not seen on WWTI. Occasionally, a reporter based at WWTI will contribute content to WSYR but most local coverage is seen on WWTI's website consisting of short headlines and features. However, WSYR does provide separate weather forecasts for the North Country region that are taped in advance.

On Saturday and Sunday mornings, the station simulcasts WSYR's local news and weather cut-ins during Good Morning America. On January 29, 2011, WSYR upgraded its newscasts to high definition and the simulcasts on this station were included. WWNY remains the only station operating a news department based in the North Country; Spectrum News covers Watertown and Massena as well from a Syracuse-based newsroom with regional content.

== Technical information ==
=== Subchannels ===
The station's signal is multiplexed:

Subchannels of WWTI
Channel	Res.	Short name	Programming
50.1	720p	WWTI-DT	ABC
50.2	720p	WWTI-2	The CW Plus
50.3	480i	LAFF	Laff
50.4	480i	MYSTERY	Ion Mystery

=== Analog-to-digital transition ===
WWTI's broadcasts, which were originally scheduled to become digital-exclusive on February 17, 2009, were forced to continue in both analog and digital until June 12 due to FCC objections at an estimated $50,000 in additional cost. At 11:59 p.m. on the revised DTV transition date, the station finally turned off its analog transmitter and became digital-exclusive.
