= Benjamin Baldwin =

Benjamin Baldwin may refer to:

- Bruce Johnston (Benjamin Baldwin, born 1942), American singer, songwriter, musician and record producer
- Benjamin Franklin Baldwin (1777–1821), American civil engineer

== See also ==
- Ben Baldwin (born 1979), British television presenter
- Benjamin Gordon Baldwin House, a historic house in Norwood, St. Lawrence County, New York
