= The New Fly Fisher =

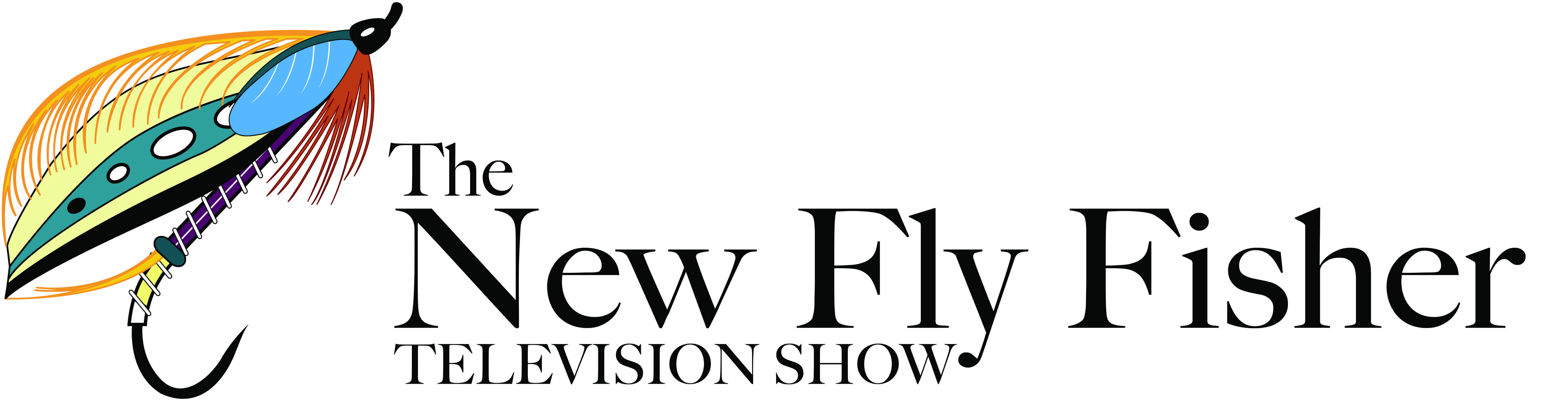
- Country: Canada
- Broadcast area: Canada and the United States
- Headquarters: Ottawa, Ontario

Ownership
- Owner: JenCor Entertainment Inc

History
- Launched: Production Began May 2000 First Broadcast March 2001 on Outdoor Life Network (Canada).

Links
- Website: www.thenewflyfisher.com

The New Fly Fisher is a popular fly fishing show in North America on the World Fishing Network and Public Television PBS. Created in March 2001, the show is hosted primarily by Colin McKeown and Bill Spicer and teaches fly fishing, marine biology, and fishing destinations.

== History ==
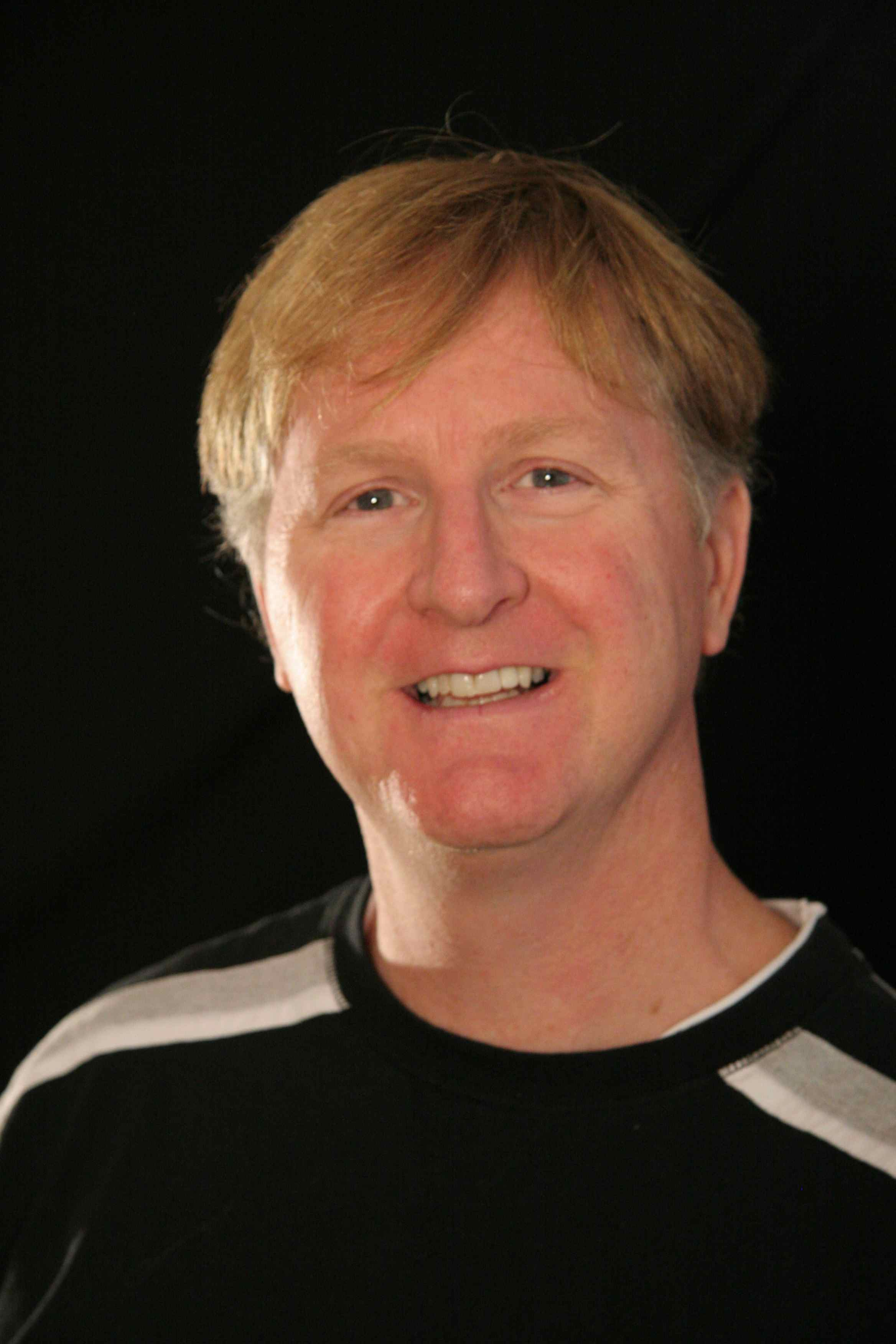
Colin McKeown TNFF

The idea for The New Fly Fisher was first conceived by Colin McKeown in 1999. During the 1990s when Colin was attempting to learn how to fly fish, he was frustrated with the poor quality of information provided by popular television fishing shows. Most series were focused on promoting products and show hosts. He felt many were nothing but glorified “infomercials”. At the time, Colin was an officer in the Royal Canadian Navy and was getting ready to retire. Creating a quality fly fishing show that taught people about fly fishing, biology, destinations and much more seemed like a great concept. Of importance, Colin wanted to create a series that was of top quality in every aspect of production. To achieve this Colin attended several college courses that taught him about television production and producing. In May 2000, Colin pitched the concept of his fly fishing series to the VP of Programming at the Outdoor Life Network in Canada. It was accepted in late June and principal photography of the first 13 episodes commenced in July. First broadcast was slated for March 2001. Throughout the past fifteen years the concept has remained essentially the same. To provide viewers with a television series that teaches by bringing on every episode subject matter experts that taught the hosts methods of fly fishing for differing species in locations throughout North America. Whether the SME's are guides, authors or fly fishing celebrities – all help the series hosts learn. Hence the series name, The New Fly Fisher. The New Fly Fisher Inc. is owned by JenCor Entertainment Inc. the principle production company created by Colin McKeown.

== Early years ==
Right from the start of broadcast on OLN Canada, the series was a hit with anglers. Both conventional tackle and fly fishing enthusiasts loved the series because of the blend of detailed information, nature and biology combined with fishing. Though the series was a hit with anglers, the first three years of production were very tough. Learning the craft of television production in often challenging environments was stressful. In addition, securing funding for the series was a constant concern because the series was relatively unknown outside of Canada. However, two events in 2003 had a dramatic and positive impact on the eventual success of the series. The first was the addition of a new and large series commissioned by OLN Canada. This series was called Truth Duty Valour and the theme was the training the Canadian Army, Navy and Air Force conducted in support of peacekeeping and peacemaking operation around the world. The series was composed of 13 one-hour episodes featuring the best of training in the military Truth Duty Valour and it would go on to be a major hit for OLN. A total of 52 episodes were created over five years and the series was also produced in French for Quebec broadcaster Historia. This series provided much needed funding and stability for JenCor Entertainment Inc. and The New Fly Fisher. The other major occurrence that positively influenced the series longterm success was the acceptance of the series for broadcast on Public Television in the USA. WPBS in Watertown, NY loved the series and helped get it picked up by NETA for distribution within PBS. Exposure to the American market vastly improved the funding for the series. In its first season the series was carried by approximately 30 Public Television stations. Today it is carried by nearly 200 stations throughout the US, reaching an estimated audience of over 70 million households in a 12-month period (APT 2011).

== Current status ==
A pivotal milestone occurred with the creation of the World Fishing Network (WFN) in 2005. WFN, which was initially broadcast only in Canada, purchased the first five seasons of The New Fly Fisher and began airing the series in 2006. WFN expanded into the US in 2008 and currently reaches approximately 40 million households throughout the United States, Canada and the Caribbean. The series was so popular with viewers that WFN made The New Fly Fisher one of their mainstay series. This broadcast coupled with Public Television have helped The New Fly Fisher reach a massive audience across North America. In 2009 NESN (North East Sports Network), which is broadcast in the New England states, picked up the series in HD. The series continues to grow in popularity and has been picked up for broadcast on many networks and stations including WildTV, Altitude Sports, and others.

== Series Hosts & Special Guests ==
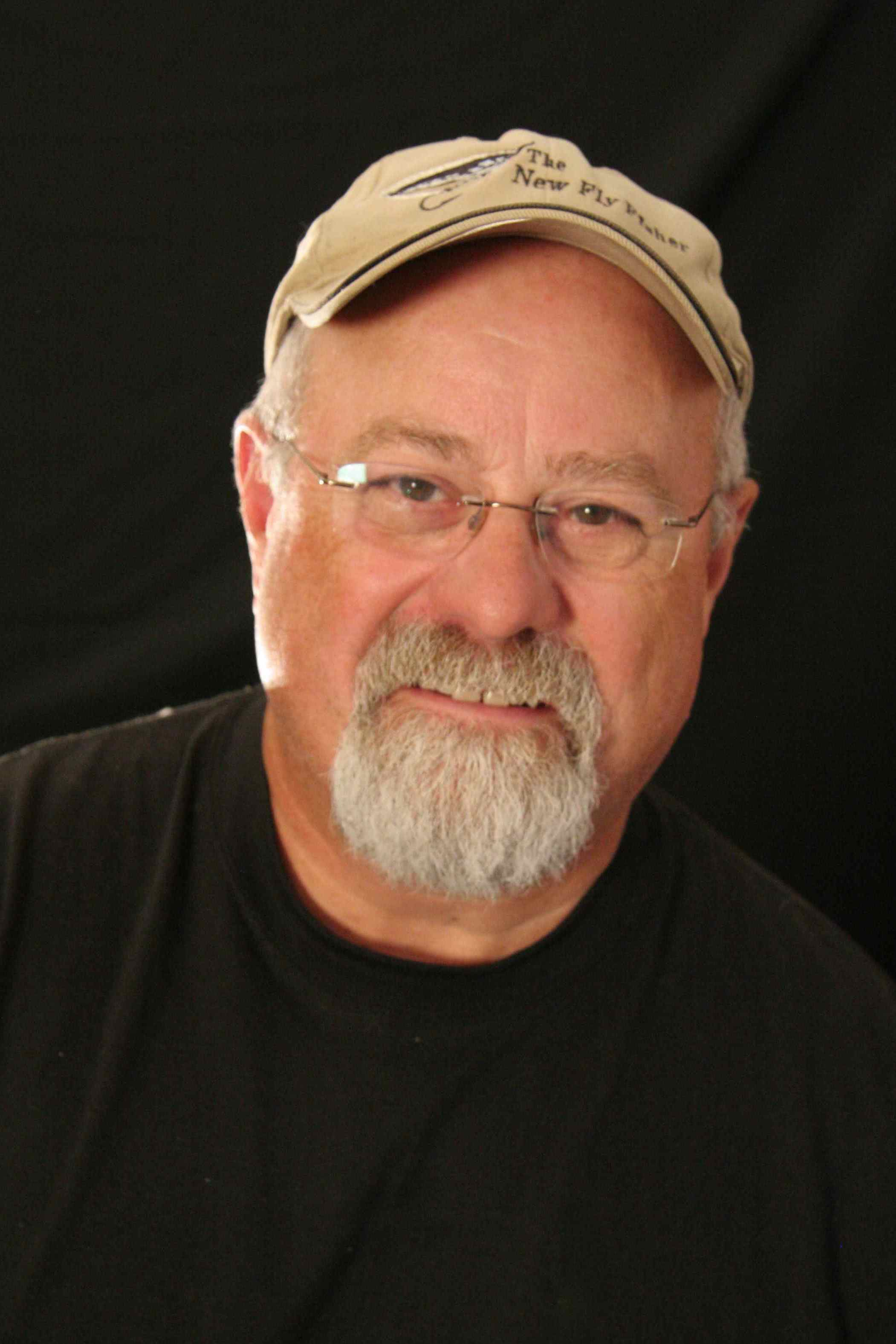
Bill Spicer TNFF

The series features two main hosts, Colin McKeown and Bill Spicer. Originally the series only featured Colin McKeown. However, Colin realized that with the creation of Truth Duty Valour and other series, it was literally impossible for him to be the sole host of the fishing show. This was further compounded when the series moved from production of 13 episodes a year to 26 to accommodate the broadcast needs of Public Television. Bill Spicer who was a popular angler and instructor in the Toronto region of Ontario, was brought on board as a full-time host. Bill has an easy-going and natural rapport with viewers. In addition, The New Fly Fisher has “Guest Hosts” from time to time. These special hosts are usually focused on some specialty or theme for a particular episode. Notable Guest Hosts include authors Tom Rosenbauer, Brian Chan, Norm Bolen, Rebekka Redd, Mark Melnyk, Jeff Pierce and Phil Rowley. Phil Rowley has become a permanent host with The New Fly Fisher as of 2015 and specializes in lake fly fishing techniques. The series has featured many popular authors and fly fishing experts including: Joe Humphreys, Tom Rosenbauer, Robert Streeter, Mike Lawson and Gary Borger.

== Ezine ==
The New Fly Fisher staff created an electronic online magazine based on the series, beginning in 2010. Chris Marshall, former editor of the popular magazine The Canadian Fly Fisher, has been involved in the production of the Ezine since it began. The Ezine combines writing, photography and video in a unique package focused solely on fly fishing. The ezine covers destinations, all species of North American fish (both fresh and saltwater), techniques and rigging options.

== YouTube ==
The New Fly Fisher established several channels on YouTube in 2012 which became very popular. In 2015 all of these channels were merged into one central YouTube channel with playlists that included full episodes, destinations, species, knots, casting and other fly fishing related information. New content is added every week to help anglers learn more about fly fishing.
