= WVNC-LD =

Television station in Watertown, New York

- Watertown, New York; United States
- Channels: Digital: 24 (UHF); Virtual: 45
- Branding: NBC Watertown; Antenna TV Watertown (45.2)

Programming
- Affiliations: 45.1: NBC; for others, see § Subchannels

Ownership
- Owner: SagamoreHill Broadcasting; (SagamoreHill of Watertown Licenses, LLC)

History
- Founded: March 24, 2015
- First air date: December 1, 2016
- Former call signs: W45EI-D (2015–2016)
- Former channel numbers: Digital: 45 (UHF, 2016–2020)
- Call sign meaning: Watertown Television North Country

Technical information
- Licensing authority: FCC
- Facility ID: 188838
- Class: LD
- ERP: 15 kW
- HAAT: 107.2 m (352 ft)
- Transmitter coordinates: 43°58′4.6″N 75°48′21.2″W

Links
- Public license information: LMS
- Website: www.nbcwatertown.com

WVNC-LD (channel 45) is a low-power television station in Watertown, New York, United States, affiliated with NBC. Owned by SagamoreHill Broadcasting, the station maintains studios at Public Square in downtown Watertown, and its transmitter is located on Miser Road in the town of Rutland.

Due to WVNC-LD's low-power status, its broadcast radius only covers the immediate Watertown area. Therefore, it relies on cable and satellite to reach the entire market.

== History ==
Although the channel 45 frequency had never been used in Watertown prior to 2015, the adjacent channel 46 was the home of WLOT-LP, Watertown's UPN affiliate, until its owner died in 2005 and the station went dark (its frequency has never been reactivated and would eventually be taken out of service in the late-2010s spectrum reallocation).

On August 28, 2016, the Federal Communications Commission (FCC) approved the transfer of control of a low-power digital television license in Watertown, W45EI-D, from Sunrise, Florida–based DTV America Corporation to SagamoreHill Broadcasting. The new owners promptly renamed the station WVNC-LD and signed it to an affiliation deal with NBC, giving the Watertown area its first locally-based full-time NBC affiliate. The new station signed on December 1, 2016. Prior to WVNC-LD's sign-on, North Country cable systems received either WSTM-TV in Syracuse or WPTZ in Plattsburgh, depending on the location. WWNY-TV previously had a secondary affiliation with the network until 1995. WPTZ and WSTM-TV are still available on cable along with WVNC-LD.

== Programming ==
WVNC-LD's main channel clears the entire NBC schedule, including The More You Know, NBC's E/I-compliant block which, as a low-power station, it is not required to clear.

Former WVNC-LD as both an Antenna TV and MyNetworkTV affiliate.

In addition to NBC programming, WVNC-LD operates the Watertown market's Antenna TV affiliate on its LD2 subchannel. Until recently, WVNC-LD2 also carried programs from the MyNetworkTV programming service, filling in programming for all time slots outside of the MyNetworkTV programming schedule with the Antenna TV schedule.

=== Local programming ===
WVNC-LD airs no local news programming, despite station officials stating at its launch that planning was underway to open a news department by early 2018. The station does, however, stream events of local interest on its YouTube channel.

== Translators ==
In addition to its main transmitter, WVNC-LD also operates three translators:

Translators of WVNC-LD
Station	City of license	Channel; TV (RF)	Facility ID	ERP	HAAT	Transmitter coordinates
WVNG-LD	Gouverneur	9 (29) (pending)	125935	5 kW	112.7 m (370 ft)	44°32′1″N 82°37′12″W
WTKJ-LD	Watertown	19 (19)	128834	15 kW	79.5 m (261 ft)	44°6′58″N 76°20′20″W
WVNV-LD	Potsdam	45 (26)	182618	0.075 kW	64.4 m (211 ft)	44°38′54.8″N 75°1′6.4″W

== Subchannels ==
The station's signal is multiplexed:

Subchannels of WVNC-LD, WVNG-LD, WTKJ-LD, and WVNV-LD
Channel	Res.	Short name	Programming
xx.1	1080i	WVNCNBC	NBC
xx.2	480i	Antenna	Antenna TV
xx.3	480i	ION	Ion
xx.4	480i	GritTv	Grit
xx.5	480i	Bounce	Bounce TV
xx.6	480i	CourtTv	Court TV
xx.8	480i	Sonlife	SonLife
