= Benjamin Gordon Baldwin House =

Historic house in New York, United States

- U.S. National Register of Historic Places
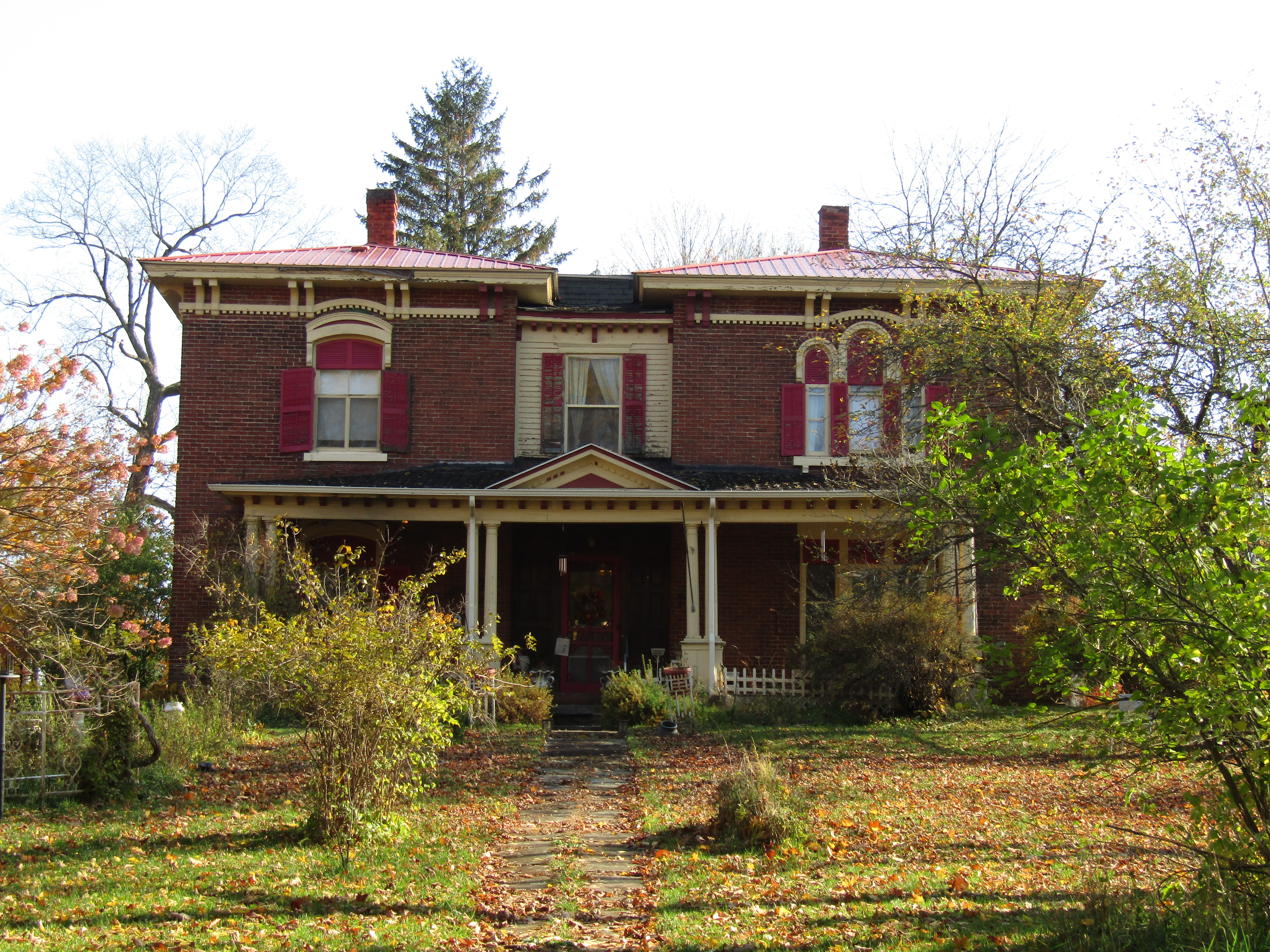

- Location within New York Location within the United States
- Location: 26 Baldwin Ave., Norwood, New York, U.S.
- Coordinates: 44°45′14″N 74°59′26″W
- Area: 1.4 acres (0.57 ha)
- Built: 1861
- Architectural style: Italianate
- NRHP reference No.: 04000994
- Added to NRHP: September 15, 2004

The Benjamin Gordon Baldwin House (also known as Baldwin Heights) is a historic house located at 26 Baldwin Avenue in Norwood, St. Lawrence County, New York.

== Description and history ==
The house was built in 1861 as an Italianate-style single family dwelling.

It was listed on the National Register of Historic Places on September 15, 2004.

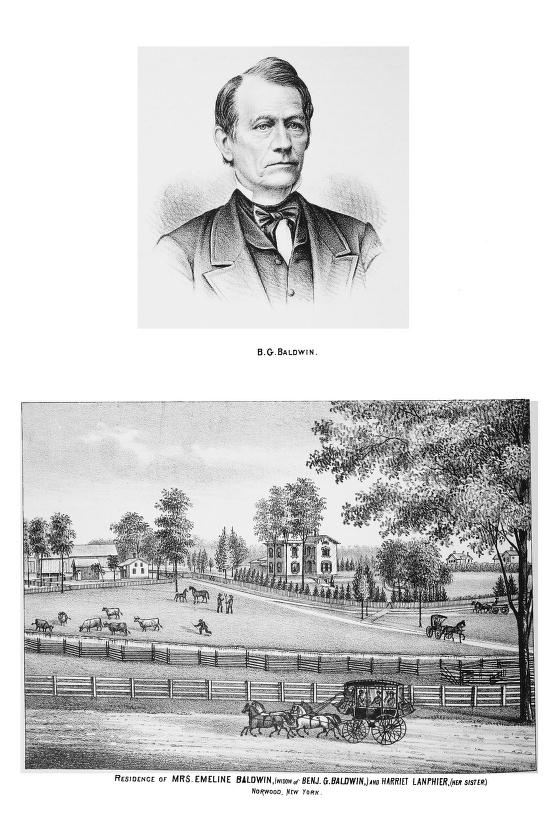
