= WWNY-TV =

Television station in Carthage, New York

WWNY-TV and WWNY-CD

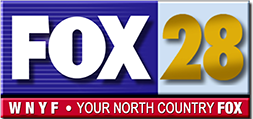

WWNY-TV: Carthage–Watertown, New York; WWNY-CD: Massena, New York; United States
- Channels for WWNY-TV: Digital: 8 (VHF); Virtual: 7
- Channels for WWNY-CD: Digital: 18 (UHF); Virtual: 28
- Branding: 7.1/28.2: WWNY-TV 7; 7 News (newscasts); 7.2/28.1: Fox 28

Programming
- Affiliations: 7.1/28.2: CBS; 7.2/28.1: Fox; for others, see § Subchannels

Ownership
- Owner: Gray Media; (Gray Television Licensee, LLC)
- Sister stations: WNYF-CD

History
- First air date: WWNY-TV: October 22, 1954; WWNY-CD: 2001 (as separate station)
- Former call signs: WWNY-TV: WCNY-TV (1954–1965); WWNY-CD: W28BC (1994–2002); WNYF-LP (2002–2010); WNYF-LD (2010–2013); WNYF-CD (2013–2014)
- Former channel number: WWNY-TV: Analog: 7 (VHF, 1954–2009); Digital: 35 (UHF, 2003–2009), 7 (VHF, 2009–2020); WWNY-CD: Analog: 28 (UHF, 1994–2010)
- Former affiliations: WWNY-TV: All secondary: DuMont (1954–1955); NBC (1954–1995); ABC (1954–1988); NTA (1956–1961); NET/PBS (1958–1971); Fox (1987–1998); WWNY-CD: ABC (as WWTI repeater); UPN (secondary; 2001–2006)
- Call sign meaning: Watertown, New York

Technical information
- Licensing authority: FCC
- Facility ID: WWNY-TV: 68851; WWNY-CD: 16744
- Class: WWNY-CD: CD
- ERP: WWNY-TV: 50 kW; WWNY-CD: 4 kW
- HAAT: WWNY-TV: 219 m (719 ft); WWNY-CD: 244.2 m (801 ft)
- Transmitter coordinates: WWNY-TV: 43°57′15″N 75°43′44″W; WWNY-CD: 44°29′29″N 74°51′26″W

Links
- Public license information: WWNY-TV: Public file; LMS; WWNY-CD: Public file; LMS
- Website: www.wwnytv.com

WWNY-TV (channel 7) is a television station licensed to Carthage, New York, United States, (Note: The original 1952 construction permit lists "WWNY-TV 48 Watertown, New York", a UHF allotment returned unbuilt when the station requested 7 Carthage in 1954. TV 7 could not be assigned to Watertown as a future 7 Buffalo, some 165 miles distant, held the allotment. (That station signed on in 1958.) To prevent interference, the FCC required 175-mile minimum spacing between co-channel VHF TV stations. That pushed WCNY-TV's transmitter east to Champion Hill, originally with a different broadcast call sign from Watertown-licensed WWNY radio.) serving as the CBS affiliate for the Watertown area. It is owned by Gray Media alongside low-power, Class A Fox affiliate WNYF-CD (channel 28). The two stations share studios on Arcade Street in downtown Watertown; WWNY-TV and WNYF-CD's transmitters are located on the same tower along NY 126/State Street on Champion Hill.

WWNY-CD (channel 28) is a Class A station licensed to Massena, New York, which operates as a translator of WWNY-TV. This station's transmitter is located at WNPI-DT's site southeast of South Colton along NY 56.

== History ==
WCNY-TV was granted a special temporary authority (STA) to begin broadcasting on October 14, 1954. It was locally owned by the Watertown Daily Times, which also owned WWNY radio (AM 790, now WTNY) in Watertown. The station carried programming from two networks at the time (CBS, ABC then added NBC by the program) but has always been a primary CBS affiliate. During the late-1950s, WCNY was also briefly affiliated with the NTA Film Network. By the mid-1960s, the station benefited from the ratings-dominant CBS programming lineup and established a large viewership base, including much of eastern Ontario, Canada. After the FCC allowed television and radio stations to share the same base call sign even when they were licensed to different cities, channel 7 changed call letters to WWNY-TV to match its radio sisters in July 1965. The WCNY-TV calls now reside on a PBS member station in nearby Syracuse.

The station was a major beneficiary of a quirk in the FCC's plan for allocating stations. In the early days of broadcast television, there were twelve VHF channels available and 69 UHF channels (later reduced to 55 in 1983). The VHF bands were more desirable because they carried longer distances. Since there were only twelve VHF channels available, there were limitations as to how closely the stations could be spaced.

After the FCC's Sixth Report and Order ended the license freeze and opened the UHF band in 1952, it devised a plan for allocating VHF licenses. Under this plan, almost all of the country would be able to receive two commercial VHF channels plus one noncommercial channel. Most of the rest of the country ("1/2") would be able to receive a third VHF channel. Other areas would be designated as "UHF islands" since they were too close to larger cities for VHF service. The "2" networks became CBS and NBC, "+1" represented non-commercial educational stations, and "1/2" became ABC (which was the weakest network usually winding up with the UHF allocation where no VHF was available).

However, Watertown was sandwiched between Syracuse (channels 3, 8, later 5, and 9) to the south, Rochester (channels 6, later 8, 10, and 13) to the west, Utica (channel 13, later 2) and Albany (channel 4, later 6, later joined by 10 and 13) to the southeast, Burlington–Plattsburgh (channels 3 and 5) to the east, Kingston (channel 11) to the northwest, Ottawa (channels 4 and 9, later joined by 13) to the north, and Montreal (channels 2, 6, 10, and 12) to the northeast. This created a large "doughnut" where there could only be one VHF license. WWNY was fortunate to gain that license, and as a result was the only television station based in the Watertown market until the early 1970s.

From 1958 until 1971, WCNY/WWNY also aired educational programming through National Educational Television (NET, becoming PBS in 1970) provided by the St. Lawrence Valley Educational Television Council. When the council established its own PBS member station, WNPE-TV (now WPBS-TV) in 1971, WWNY donated its original studios to the new station as it had moved to its current location near the Watertown Daily Times offices on Arcade Street in Downtown Watertown in mid-February 1970. The Johnson family sold WWNY to United Communications Corporation in 1981 for $8.2 million after an unsuccessful struggle against the FCC and its directive for newspapers to divest themselves of television stations held within the same market.

Until WFYF (now WWTI) signed-on in 1988 replacing a small WUTR repeater on analog UHF channel 50 and taking the ABC affiliation, WWNY was Watertown's only commercial station. As a primary CBS affiliate, WWNY carried the network's full prime time schedule and news programs while cherry-picking the most popular ABC and NBC shows aired at other hours. The station also aired some Fox programming starting in 1987 while Sunday Fox Sports National Football League games aired on WWTI. When cable arrived in the region in the 1970s, viewers could watch the full network schedules via NBC affiliate WSTM-TV and ABC affiliate WIXT (now WSYR-TV) in Syracuse or NBC affiliate WPTZ in Plattsburgh.

Channel 7 gradually phased out non-CBS programming in the 1980s. ABC completely disappeared from the schedule when WFYF signed-on. NBC programs (including Today and The Tonight Show) remained on WWNY into the 1980s with some prime time programming (which aired delayed) lasting until 1995. After that, viewers received NBC programming from either WSTM or WPTZ, depending on location, until December 1, 2016, when WVNC-LD signed on as Watertown's first full-time NBC affiliate. Fox programs largely disappeared in the early-1990s with the exception of Major League Baseball games from Fox Sports which lasted until 1998.

On February 8, 2019, Gray Television announced it was purchasing the United stations, including WWNY-TV, WNYF-CD and WWNY-CD. In advance of the purchase, Gray assumed control of the stations via a local marketing agreement (LMA) on March 1. WWNY-TV, WNYF-CD and WWNY-CD would be Gray's first stations in New York State; the acquisition would make them sister stations to fellow CBS affiliate WCAX-TV in adjacent Burlington, Vermont, another station owned by a small independent operator (in WCAX's case, the Hasbrook-Martin family) before Gray bought the station in 2017. The sale was completed on May 1.

=== Translator history ===
WWNY-CD was originally a repeater for ABC affiliate WWTI (channel 50) with the call sign W28BC. During that time, WWTI and WWNY had secondary affiliations with Fox. WWNY's secondary affiliation was for NFL games during the years CBS did not have broadcasting rights of the league. When that network acquired the rights to the AFC, WWTI then aired NFC games from Fox, in addition to ABC's Monday Night Football (now on fellow Disney network ESPN).

In 2001, United Communications and WWNY entered into an agreement with Smith Broadcasting to make W28BC and sister station W25AB full-time Fox affiliates; Smith formerly owned WWTI, but did not include the translators in that station's sale to Ackerley Group in 2000. W25AB then changed its call letters to WNYF-LP and eventually moved from channel 25 to channel 28; after the Watertown station upgraded to Class A status in October 2002 (becoming WNYF-CA, later WNYF-CD), W28BC inherited the WNYF-LP call sign. WNYF-LP's low-powered analog signal on UHF channel 28 aired from a transmitter on NY 420 in Massena.

On June 30, 2009, United Communications applied to the FCC for a digital version of WNYF-LP on UHF channel 18. This allocation was formerly used for WNPI-DT's analog signal. It was approved for construction on June 8, 2010. Taking on the WNYF-LD call sign, it is officially licensed as a translator of WWNY-TV. This helps St. Lawrence County viewers who had experienced difficulty receiving WWNY's digital signal after that station transitioned to digital-only broadcasts.

On May 15, 2013, WNYF-CD and WNYF-LD swapped call signs, as the Massena station is licensed as a class A facility while the Watertown digital station, at that time, was not. On February 6, 2014, WNYF-CD changed its call letters to WWNY-CD; on March 13, 2014, the class A status for the Watertown station was transferred from the analog channel 28 license to the digital channel 35 license, retaking the WNYF-CD call sign.

== News operation ==
On the same night it began airing in 1954, WWNY produced a five-minute local update at 11:15. For its entire existence, the station has held the number one spot in area Nielsen ratings by a wide margin. WWNY has traditionally been the dominant outlet in the North Country because it had the market to itself until WWTI signed-on in 1987. That station's two attempts at local newscasts—from 1987 to 1991 and from 1995 to 2004—never made any headway in the ratings, and WWNY remained the most-watched and highest-rated station. Since 2004, it has been the only station in the market with a functioning news department.

In 1981, this station's weekday morning show only consisted of two five-minute cut-ins. As late as 1998, it was broadcasting for thirty minutes. In 2004, the station began producing ninety minutes of news on weekday mornings.

On April 11, 2001, WWNY began airing a 35-minute weeknight prime time broadcast at 10 on WNYF called 7 News Tonight on Fox. However, it was only seen by a handful of viewers able to receive that station's two low-power over-the-air signals because WNYF was not yet being offered on cable. An agreement with Time Warner Cable (now Charter Spectrum) in fall 2001 placed the station on the system and the prime time news debuted for the rest of the area on October 4.

WNYF currently simulcasts the 6 a.m. hour of WWNY's weekday morning news. It then offers a second hour at 7 a.m. seen exclusively on the Fox affiliate while this station airs CBS Mornings. The simulcast and separate show is known on WNYF as 7 News This Morning on Fox. There is no weekday morning or noon meteorologist; news anchor Beth Hall presents a forecast from AccuWeather during these segments. During the nightly evening weather forecasts, the station features a live National Weather Service weather radar based in Montague's Parkers section.

== Technical information ==
=== Subchannels ===
The stations' signals are multiplexed:

Subchannels of WWNY-TV and WWNY-CD
Channel		Res.	Short name	Programming
WWNY-TV	WWNY-CD	Res.	Short name	Programming
7.1	28.2	1080i	CBS	CBS
7.2	28.1	720p	FOX	Fox (WNYF-CD)
7.3	N/A	480i	IONPLUS	Ion Plus
7.4	N/A	480i	OUTLAW	Outlaw
7.5	N/A	480i	OXYGEN	Oxygen
7.6	28.6	480i	MeTV	MeTV

Simulcast of subchannels of another station

=== Analog-to-digital transition ===
In May 2003, WWNY started broadcasting its digital signal on UHF channel 35 and began offering CBS programming in high definition. It then created a new second digital subchannel to offer a digital signal of WNYF as that station did not operate one of its own due to analog-only Class A and low-power signals.

WWNY has been digital-only since February 17, 2009. Both broadcasts of WWNY and WWTI were set to become digital-only starting on February 17. However, the latter's plans were delayed to June 12 by the FCC. WWNY-DT's previous digital facilities on channel 35 were eventually re-employed by sister station WNYF to offer Fox in high definition for the first time.
