= Norwood, New York =

- Village
- Motto: "A nice place to live"
- Location within the state of New York
- Coordinates: 44°44′54″N 74°59′50″W
- Country: United States
- State: New York
- County: St. Lawrence

Government
  - Mayor: Mark Tebo

Area
  - Total: 2.26 sq mi (5.86 km^{2})
  - Land: 2.10 sq mi (5.43 km^{2})
  - Water: 0.17 sq mi (0.44 km^{2})
- Elevation: 331 ft (101 m)

Population (2020)
  - Total: 1,552
  - Density: 740.9/sq mi (286.05/km^{2})
- Time zone: UTC-5 (Eastern (EST))
  - Summer (DST): UTC-4 (EDT)
- FIPS code: 36-54012
- GNIS feature ID: 0976744

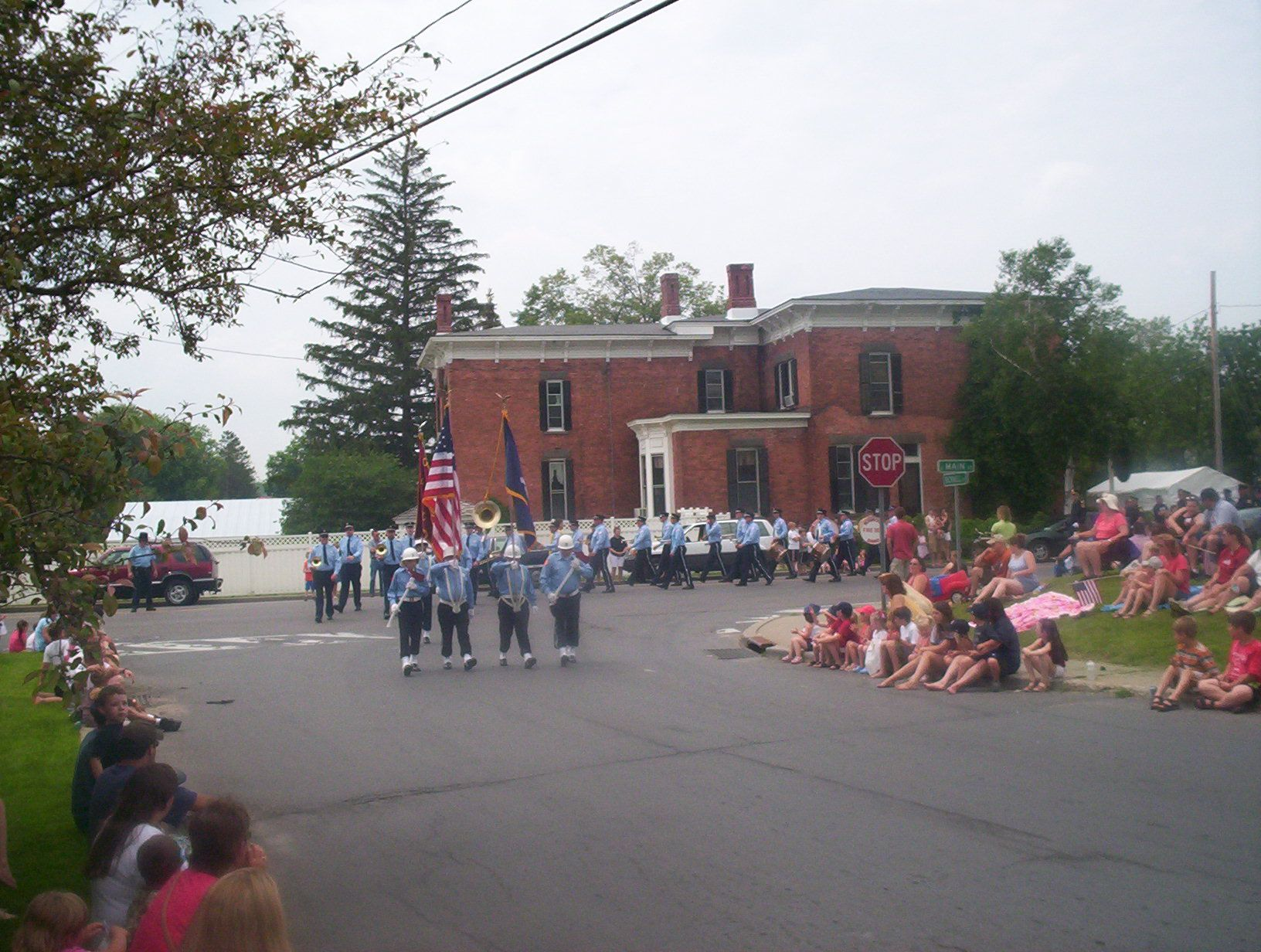
2006 July 4th parade in Norwood, New York

Norwood is a village located in St. Lawrence County, New York, United States. As of the 2020 census, Norwood had a population of 1,552. The village is located partly in the towns of Potsdam and Norfolk, and is east of the village of Potsdam.

== History ==
The community was known early in its history as "Raquetteville." Norwood as it is known today, grew out of the shadows of Potsdam, New York in the 1870s. In 1871 this growing Potsdam hamlet became the village of Potsdam Junction. Villagers later wanted to further distinguish their municipality from the town through renaming; the first proposal was to call is Baldwin, but that was rejected due to a post office of that name. On April 15, 1875, Norwood was selected. The mayor of Norwood is currently Mark Tebo.

The Benjamin Gordon Baldwin House was listed on the National Register of Historic Places in 2004.

== Geography ==
Norwood is located at 44°44'54" north, 74°59'50" west (44.748416, -74.997269).

According to the United States Census Bureau, the village has a total area of 2.3 square miles (6.0 km^{2}), of which 2.1 square miles (5.4 km^{2}) is land and 0.2 square miles (0.52 km^{2}) is water. The total area is 8.41% water.

The village straddles the Raquette River.

North–south highway, New York State Route 56 (North/South Main Street) passes through the center of the village. County Road 35 enters the village from the west, and County Road 48 joins NY-56 just south of the village.

== Demographics ==
Historical population
Census	Pop.	Note	%±
1880	1,221		—
1890	1,463		19.8%
1900	1,714		17.2%
1910	1,993		16.3%
1920	1,808		−9.3%
1930	1,880		4.0%
1940	1,905		1.3%
1950	1,995		4.7%
1960	2,200		10.3%
1970	2,098		−4.6%
1980	1,902		−9.3%
1990	1,841		−3.2%
2000	1,685		−8.5%
2010	1,657		−1.7%
2020	1,552		−6.3%
U.S. Decennial Census

As of the census of 2000, there were 1,685 people, 685 households, and 446 families residing in the village. The population density was 814.1 inhabitants per square mile (314.3/km^{2}). There were 750 housing units at an average density of 362.4 per square mile (139.9/km^{2}), of which 685 were occupied. The racial makeup of the village was 98.46% white, .36% African American, .42% Native American, .53% Asian, 0% Pacific Islander, .12% from other races, and .12% from two or more races. .65% of the population were Hispanic or Latino of any race.

There were 685 households, out of which 30.4% had children under the age of 18 living with them, 49.6% were married couples living together, 11.2% had a female householder with no husband present, and 34.9% were non-families. 28.3% of all households were made up of individuals, and 11.1% had someone living alone who was 65 years of age or older. The average household size was 2.39 and the average family size was 2.93.

In the village, the population was spread out, with 23.4% under the age of 18, 8.8% from 18 to 24, 28.4% from 25 to 44, 25.6% from 45 to 64, and 13.7% who were 65 years of age or older. The median age was 38 years. Males make up 49.4% of the population while females make up the other 50.6%.

The median income for a household in the village was $37,150, and the median income for a family was $43,068. Male full-time, year-round workers had a median income of $36,187 versus $24,167 for females. The per capita income for the village was $18,063. 11.6% of the population and 62.1% of families were below the poverty line. Out of the total population, 9.8% of those under the age of 18 and 8.8% of those 65 and older were living below the poverty line.

== The Brass Firemen ==
The Norwood Brass Firemen is a brass band composed primarily of volunteer firemen, founded by Fred Morgan in 1945. The band has played in front of numerous audiences ever since.

In 1979 the band was invited to play in Albany, New York, and was telecast across the state.

In 1980, the band was invited by former Congressman David O’Brien Martin to play in Washington, DC on the Capitol steps and also at the Lincoln Memorial.

In 1982 the band was invited back to Washington DC to play for then First Lady Nancy Reagan.

The band played on and performed at the International Luge event held in Lake Placid, New York, in 1983. The band as usual drew notice while performing, this time from the US Olympic Committee (USOC), and was invited to play at the 1984 Winter Olympics held in Sarajevo, Yugoslavia. The Brass Firemen would be the Official USA Band in the Opening Ceremonies for the 1984 Winter Olympic Games.

The Brass Firemen play a mix of New Orleans style jazz, military, and traditional marching band standards, affectionately referred to by the band members as, "Dixieland jazz, North Country style."

== See also ==
- WNPI-TV
