= WNYF-CD =

Television station in Watertown, New York

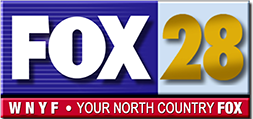

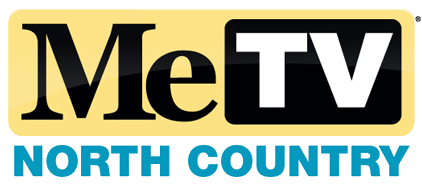
- Watertown, New York; United States
- Channels: Digital: 35 (UHF); Virtual: 28
- Branding: Fox 28; 7 News (newscasts)

Programming
- Affiliations: 28.1: Fox; 28.2: MeTV

Ownership
- Owner: Gray Media; (Gray Television Licensee, LLC)
- Sister stations: WWNY-TV

History
- First air date: 2001 (as separate station)
- Former call signs: For canceled WNYF-LP: W25AB (1982–2001); WNYF-LP (2001–2002); WNYF-CA (2002–2015); WNYF-CD: WNYF-CD (2008–2013); WNYF-LD (2013–2014)
- Former channel numbers: Analog: 25 (UHF, 1987–2002), 28 (UHF, 2002–2015)
- Former affiliations: ABC (as WWTI repeater); UPN (secondary; 2002–2006)
- Call sign meaning: Watertown, New York's Fox

Technical information
- Licensing authority: FCC
- Facility ID: 168478
- Class: CD
- ERP: 15 kW
- HAAT: 198.5 m (651 ft)
- Transmitter coordinates: 43°57′15″N 75°43′44″W
- Translator(s): WWNY-TV 7.2 Carthage

Links
- Public license information: Public file; LMS

WNYF-CD (channel 28) is a low-power, Class A television station in Watertown, New York, United States, affiliated with the Fox network. It is owned by Gray Media alongside Carthage-licensed CBS affiliate WWNY-TV (channel 7). The two stations share studios on Arcade Street in downtown Watertown; WNYF-CD and WWNY-TV's transmitters are located on the same tower along NY 126/State Street on Champion Hill.

Since WNYF-CD's transmitter is not nearly strong enough to cover the entire market, the station can also be seen in 720p high definition on WWNY-TV's second digital subchannel.

== History ==
Before becoming a separate entity, WNYF-CD was a repeater for ABC affiliate WWTI (channel 50) with the call signs W25AB and W28BC. During that time, WWTI and WWNY had secondary affiliations with Fox. WWNY's secondary affiliation was for NFL games during the years CBS did not have broadcasting rights of the league. When that network acquired the rights to the AFC, WWTI then aired NFC games from Fox, in addition to ABC's Monday Night Football (now on fellow Disney network ESPN).

In 2001, United Communications and WWNY entered into an agreement with Smith Broadcasting to make W25AB and W28BC full-time Fox affiliates; Smith formerly owned WWTI, but did not include the translators in that station's sale to Ackerley Group in 2000. W25AB then changed its call letters to WNYF-LP and eventually moved from channel 25 to channel 28; after the Watertown station upgraded to Class A status in October 2002 (becoming WNYF-CA), W28BC inherited the WNYF-LP call sign. WNYF-LP's low-powered analog signal on UHF channel 28 aired from a transmitter on NY 420 in Massena.

An agreement with Time Warner Cable (now Charter Spectrum) in fall 2001 placed the station on channel 2. Normally, cable systems are not obligated to carry low-power stations. However, the FCC's must-carry rules also give full-power stations the option of "retransmission consent," or requesting compensation from cable systems to carry their station. In this case, WNYF is carried on North Country cable systems as part of the compensation for carrying WWNY. After a year of joint operation of WNYF by Smith Broadcasting and United Communications, the latter took complete ownership and made it a full sister to WWNY. Until September 18, 2006, when UPN shut down and merged with The WB to form The CW, WNYF also ran some programming from the network as a secondary affiliate.

On August 25, 2008, WNYF-CA received FCC approval to begin its own high definition digital broadcasts as WNYF-CD on UHF channel 35 after WWNY-DT returned to its former analog position on VHF channel 7 (which happened February 17, 2009). On September 14, WNYF-CD signed-on using WWNY-DT's existing UHF antenna structure. The change represented the first time WNYF was available over-the-air in high definition.

On June 30, 2009, United Communications applied to the FCC for a digital version of WNYF-LP on UHF channel 18. This allocation was formerly used for WNPI-DT's analog signal. It was approved for construction on June 8, 2010. Taking on the WNYF-LD call sign, it features Fox as well as a simulcast of WWNY on a second digital subchannel. This helps St. Lawrence County viewers who had experienced difficulty receiving WWNY's digital signal after that station transitioned to digital-only broadcasts.

On December 16, 2010, WNYF began to be seen on Time Warner Cable systems in the Burlington, Vermont–Plattsburgh, New York market after the provider dropped that area's affiliate WFFF-TV because of an ongoing retransmission dispute. The dispute was eventually resolved and the local station was added back to the system.

On May 15, 2013, WNYF-CD and WNYF-LD swapped call signs, as the Massena station is licensed as a class A facility while the Watertown digital station, at that time, was not. On February 6, 2014, WNYF-CD changed its call letters to WWNY-CD; on March 13, 2014, the class A status for the Watertown station was transferred from the analog channel 28 license to the digital channel 35 license, retaking the WNYF-CD call sign. WWNY-TV and WNYF-CD both go off-the-air, for a couple hours, during overnights.

On February 9, 2016, WWNY announced on its website that it would begin carrying MeTV on WNYF-CD2 in the late summer. The deal, which took effect on September 1, did not affect WWNY-CD, which continues to simulcast WWNY on its CD2 subchannel. On-air, WNYF-CD2 is known as "MeTV North Country".

On February 8, 2019, Gray Television announced it was purchasing the United stations, including WWNY-TV, WNYF-CD and WWNY-CD. In advance of the purchase, Gray assumed control of the stations via a local marketing agreement (LMA) on March 1. WWNY-TV, WNYF-CD and WWNY-CD would be Gray's first stations in New York State; the acquisition would make them sister stations to fellow CBS affiliate WCAX-TV in adjacent Burlington, Vermont. The sale was completed on May 1.

== Newscasts ==
On April 11, 2001, WWNY began airing a 35-minute weeknight prime time broadcast at 10 on WNYF called 7 News Tonight on Fox. However, it was only seen by the few viewers able to receive that station's two low-power over-the-air signals because WNYF was not yet being offered on cable. An agreement with Time Warner Cable in fall 2001 placed the station on the system and the prime time news debuted for the rest of the area on October 4. WNYF simulcasts the 6 a.m. hour of WWNY's weekday morning news and then offers a second hour at 7 seen exclusively on WNYF while WWNY airs CBS Mornings. The simulcast and separate show is known on WNYF as 7 News This Morning on Fox. Although there is no weekday morning or noon meteorologist, news anchor Beth Hall presents the weather forecast. During the weeknight weather segment, the station features a live National Weather Service weather radar based in the Parkers section of Montague.

== Subchannels ==
The station's digital signal is multiplexed:

Subchannels of WNYF-CD
Channel	Res.	Short name	Programming
28.1	720p	WNYF-CD	Fox
28.2	480i	MeTV	MeTV (4:3)
