= WPBS-TV =

Television station in Watertown, New York

WPBS-TV and WNPI-DT

WPBS-TV: Watertown, New York; WNPI-DT: Norwood, New York; United States
- Channels for WPBS-TV: Digital: 26 (UHF); Virtual: 16
- Channels for WNPI-DT: Digital: 23 (UHF); Virtual: 18
- Branding: WPBS PBS

Programming
- Affiliations: 16.1/18.1: PBS; for others, see § Subchannels

Ownership
- Owner: St. Lawrence Valley Educational TV Council, Inc.

History
- First air date: WPBS-TV: August 20, 1971; WNPI-DT: September 5, 1971
- Former call signs: WPBS-TV: WNPE-TV (1971–1998); WPBS-DT (2009–2020); WNPI-DT: WNPI-TV (1971−2009)
- Former channel number: WPBS-TV: Analog: 16 (UHF, 1971–2009); Digital: 41 (UHF, 2005–2019); WNPI-DT: Analog: 18 (UHF, 1971–2009)
- Call sign meaning: WPBS-TV: Public Broadcasting Service

Technical information
- Licensing authority: FCC
- Facility ID: WPBS-TV: 62136; WNPI-DT: 62137
- ERP: WPBS-TV: 98 kW; WNPI-DT: 40 kW
- HAAT: WPBS-TV: 373.3 m (1,225 ft); WNPI-DT: 241.63 m (793 ft)
- Transmitter coordinates: WPBS-TV: 43°51′46″N 75°43′38″W; WNPI-DT: 44°29′29″N 74°51′26″W

Links
- Public license information: WPBS-TV: Public file; LMS; WNPI-DT: Public file; LMS
- Website: www.wpbstv.org

WPBS-TV (channel 16) and WNPI-DT (channel 18) are PBS member television stations licensed respectively to Watertown and Norwood, New York, United States. Owned by the St. Lawrence Valley Educational TV Council, the stations maintain studios on Arsenal Street in Watertown. WPBS-TV's transmitter is located on Lewis County Route 194 in Denmark, New York, while WNPI's tower is in South Colton.

WNPI operates as a full-time satellite of WPBS; its existence is only acknowledged in station identifications. Aside from the transmitter, WNPI does not maintain any physical presence locally in Norwood.

The two stations service most of northeastern New York as well as Ottawa and Kingston, Ontario, Canada; their slogan "Your Two-Nation Station" reflects this Canadian audience.

== History ==
The St. Lawrence Valley Educational Television Council, which was organized in 1958, originally produced educational television programming to be carried by local CBS affiliate WWNY-TV (channel 7). In 1971, it established a free-standing PBS station, WNPE-TV, using WWNY's original studios on Champion Hill as the commercial station had already relocated to a larger facility in Watertown. Full-time satellite WNPI-TV signed on a few weeks later. Outgrowing the Champion Hill location itself, WNPE moved to a new building in Watertown in 1978.

Because of its large Canadian viewership, WNPE was one of the more successful PBS stations, with fundraising totals often exceeding those of stations in much larger markets.

For a minor sum, the rights to use the WPBS call letters were purchased from a small radio station in Conyers, Georgia, in the late 1990s; the call sign change to WPBS-TV took effect on September 1, 1998. Following the shutdown of analog television signals, WPBS switched to a "-DT" suffix on July 2, 2009, as did WNPI; WPBS returned to the "-TV" suffix on March 11, 2020. Despite the calls, which mimic the callsign schemes used by stations owned by ABC, NBC and CBS in New York City and Los Angeles, WPBS-TV is not an owned-and-operated station (nor is similarly named KPBS in San Diego), as PBS cannot own or operate any of its member stations due to the network's local and non-profit nature; the WPBS callsign reflects the station's affiliation and programming, but not any special status within PBS.

Despite its strong viewership in Canada, Rogers Cable, the main cable provider in Ottawa, announced in July 2009 that it would replace WPBS on its systems with Detroit's WTVS by mid-August to provide a higher-quality PBS feed, as WTVS could be fed via fiber optic cable rather than from over-the-air signals. Shortly after receiving this news, a Facebook campaign called 'Save WPBS in Ottawa' (later renamed 'Ottawa Loves WPBS') urging Rogers to reconsider its decision to pull the station was launched, attracting hundreds of supporters, as well as local Ottawa politicians. On July 30, 2009, it was announced that WPBS would offer a fiber-optic feed of the station for Rogers transmitted from Buffalo, New York.

Erie, Pennsylvania's WQLN, which serves viewers in the London, Ontario area through Rogers, was also threatened with removal from the Rogers system; as with WPBS, WQLN offered a fiber connection with Rogers.

== Programming ==
WPBS produces a variety of programming for both local and national distribution. For many outside New York and the surrounding region, WPBS is synonymous with programming ranging from Rod and Reel and Streamside (distributed to PBS member stations nationally from 1985 to 2006). to Classical Stretch (distributed nationally since 1999 by APT). They also carry other nationally distributed programs from PBS and American Public Television.

=== WPBS-produced TV series ===
- Bill Saiff's Rod & Reel (1985–2001, nationally distributed by PBS)
- Cabin Country
- Camp Willie
- Discovering Jefferson County
- Discovering Pets
- Energy Efficiency: Enhancing Home Performance
- The Gardener (2001, a thirteen-part series).
- Journeys of an Artist (2006, national) a thirteen-episode series combining art and travel.
- Park It
- Streamside with Don Meissner
- WPBS Weekly: Inside the Stories

=== National programming ===
WPBS-originated programming distributed to public television stations nationally by American Public Television includes:

- The Artist's World
- Artist's World Sketches
- CD Highway
- Classical Stretch (1999–2005)
- Cottage Country
- Flyfishing Destinations
- From a Country Garden
- Rod & Reel Streamside (2001–2006)

WPBS-originated programming distributed to public television stations by the National Educational Telecommunications Association includes:

- Fishing Behind the Lines
- The New Fly Fisher
- Painting with Wilson Bickford

=== WPBS local and regional television series ===
- Jefferson's Table, local wines, history and cuisine.
- Whiz Quiz, a quizbowl-style competition.
  - Whiz Quiz Canada, Canadian version of Whiz Quiz.
- WPBS-LIVE!, a live call-in show presenting topics of local interest to both nations.

== Technical information ==
=== Subchannels ===
The stations' signals are multiplexed:

Subchannels of WPBS-TV and WNPI-DT
Channel		Res.	Short name		Programming
WPBS-TV	WNPI-DT	Res.	WPBS-TV	WNPI-DT	Programming
16.1	18.1	1080i	WPBS-HD	WNPI-HD	PBS
16.2	18.2	480i	WPBS-2	WNPI-2	Create
16.3	18.3	480i	WPBS-3	WNPI-3	World
16.4	18.4	480i	WPBS-4	WNPI-4	PBS Kids

The four digital subchannels are identical for both WPBS-TV and WNPI-DT.

The station had requested an increase in power from 40 kW to 60 kW for each digital transmitter. While this request had not been addressed by the U.S. Federal Communications Commission in time for WPBS/WNPI's April 12, 2009, analog shutoff date, which was sooner than the June 12, 2009, date for American analog stations to end, a construction permit was issued later that year for the increased-power digital facilities.

WPBS-TV's former analog channel number (UHF 16) was in use by WXXI-TV in Rochester from 2003 until 2019. WNPI-TV's former analog channel number (UHF 18) and antenna location has been reassigned to WWNY-CD, a Massena rebroadcaster of Fox affiliate WNYF-CD.

== Coverage area ==
WPBS-TV can be seen by a total of 2.2 million viewers. This is despite the fact it is the smallest PBS member in New York State; there are only 252,000 people in its American viewing area. However, the signal from its two towers reaches far enough to serve the Ottawa Valley region via cable. This market, with over 1.5 million people–almost six times the population of WPBS' American viewing area–is the fourth-largest in Canada. Much of WPBS' viewer support has also come from Canadian viewers, as 70% of donations during recent pledge drives came from viewers in Ottawa. The station also maintains a mailing address in Gananoque, Ontario to service its Canadian donors.

WPBS' service area comprises mostly rural areas and small towns. The only major urban areas in its service area are Ottawa and Kingston.

In the past, reflecting its two-nation audience, the U.S. and Canadian national anthems were played on station sign-on and sign-off.
