= Poughkeepsie, New York =

City in New York, United States

Poughkeepsie
- City
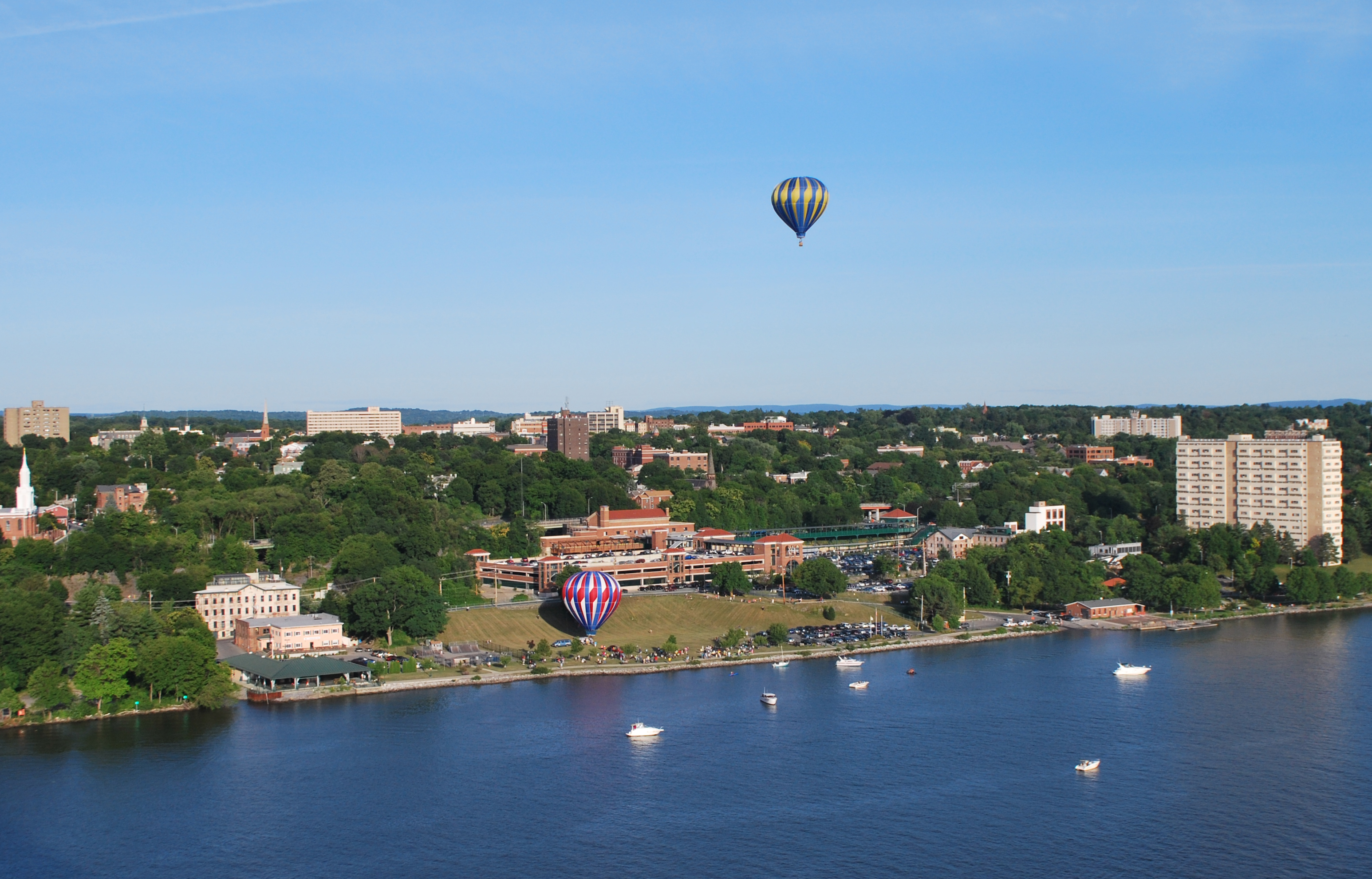
- Poughkeepsie during its annual balloon festival

- Flag Seal
- Etymology: U-puku-ipi-sing: "The reed-covered lodge by the little-water place"
- Nicknames: The Queen City of the Hudson, PK
- Interactive map of Poughkeepsie
- Location within New York Location within the United States Location within North America
- Coordinates: 41°42′21″N 73°55′42″W
- Country: United States
- State: New York
- County: Dutchess
- Founded: 1686; 340 years ago
- Incorporated (town): 1799; 227 years ago
- Incorporated (city): 1854; 172 years ago

Government
  - Type: Mayor–council government
  - Mayor: Yvonne Flowers (D)
  - Common Council: List: At-Large: Da'Ron Wilson (D); W1: Ernest Henry (D); W2: Evan Menist (D); W3: Terriciena Brown (D); W4: Nathan Shook, Vice-Chair (D); W5: Ondie James (D); W6: Christopher Grant (D); W7: Nedra Thompson, Majority Leader (D); W8: Daniel Atonna (D)

Area
  - City: 5.72 sq mi (14.81 km^{2})
  - Land: 5.14 sq mi (13.32 km^{2})
  - Water: 0.58 sq mi (1.49 km^{2})
  - Urban: 327.1 sq mi (847.3 km^{2})
- Elevation: 180 ft (55 m)
- Highest elevation (College Hill): 380 ft (120 m)
- Lowest elevation (Hudson River): 0 ft (0 m)

Population (2020)
  - City: 31,577
  - Density: 6,137.9/sq mi (2,369.86/km^{2})
  - Urban: 314,766 (US: 131st)
  - Urban density: 1,499/sq mi (578.9/km^{2})
  - Metro: 697,221 (US: 84th)
- Time zone: UTC−5 (EST)
  - Summer (DST): UTC−4 (EDT)
- ZIP Codes: 12601–12603
- Area code: 845
- FIPS code: 36-59641
- Website: www.cityofpoughkeepsie.com

Poughkeepsie (/pəˈkɪpsi/ pə-KIP-see) is the largest city in, and county seat of, Dutchess County, New York, United States. It is surrounded by the Town of Poughkeepsie and had a population of 31,577 at the 2020 census, while the Kiryas Joel–Poughkeepsie–Newburgh metropolitan area has an estimated 712,000 residents. Poughkeepsie is in the Hudson Valley region, midway between the core of the New York metropolitan area and the state capital of Albany. It is served by the nearby Hudson Valley Regional Airport and Stewart International Airport in Orange County, New York.

Poughkeepsie has been called "The Queen City of the Hudson". Originally part of New Netherland, it was settled in the 17th century by the Dutch and became New York State's second capital shortly after the American Revolution. It was chartered as a city in 1854. Major bridges in the city include the Walkway over the Hudson, a former railroad bridge which reopened as a public walkway in 2009; and the Mid-Hudson Bridge, a major thoroughfare built in 1930 that carries U.S. Route 44. The city of Poughkeepsie lies in New York's 18th congressional district.

The City of Poughkeepsie and neighboring Town of Poughkeepsie are generally viewed as a single place and are commonly referred to collectively as "Poughkeepsie", with a combined population of 77,048 in 2020. Educational institutions include Marist University, Vassar College, Dutchess Community College and The Culinary Institute of America.

== Etymology ==
The name Poughkeepsie is derived from a word in the Wappinger tribe's Munsee language, roughly U-puku-ipi-sing, meaning 'the reed-covered lodge by the little-water place', referring to a spring or stream feeding into the Hudson River south of the downtown area.

== History ==
English colonist Robert Sanders and Dutch colonist Myndert Harmense Van Den Bogaerdt acquired the land on which Poughkeepsie now sits from a local Native American tribe in 1686, and the first settlers were the families of Barent Baltus Van Kleeck and Hendrick Jans van Oosterom. The settlement grew quickly, and the Reformed Church of Poughkeepsie was established by 1720.

The city of Poughkeepsie was spared from battle during the American Revolutionary War and became the second capital of the State of New York after Kingston was burned by the British. In 1788, the Ratification Convention for New York State included Alexander Hamilton, John Jay, and George Clinton. They assembled at the courthouse on Market Street and ratified the United States Constitution, and New York State entered the new union as the eleventh of the original Thirteen Colonies to become the United States. In 1799, a new seal was created for the city.

The community was set off from the town of Poughkeepsie when it became an incorporated village on March 27, 1799. The city of Poughkeepsie was chartered on March 28, 1854.

Poughkeepsie was a major center for whale rendering, and its industry flourished during the 19th century through shipping, millineries, paper mills, and several breweries along the Hudson River, including some owned by Matthew Vassar, founder of Vassar College. Wealthy families such as the Astors, Rogers, and Vanderbilts, built palatial weekend homes nearby due to the area's natural beauty. The Vanderbilt Mansion is located several miles up the Hudson from Poughkeepsie in the town of Hyde Park and is registered as a national historic site; it is considered to be a sterling example of the mansions built by American industrialists during the Gilded Age of the late 19th century. Locust Grove, the former home of Samuel F.B. Morse, the inventor of the telegraph, is nearby. The city is home to the Bardavon 1869 Opera House, the oldest continuously operating entertainment venue in the state.

== Geography ==
The city of Poughkeepsie is located on the western edge of Dutchess County, in New York's Hudson River Valley Area.

It is bordered by the town of Lloyd in Ulster County across the Hudson River to the west and by the town of Poughkeepsie on the north, east and south. There are two crossings of the Hudson River in Poughkeepsie: the Mid-Hudson Bridge for motor vehicles and pedestrians, and the pedestrian Walkway over the Hudson.

According to the United States Census Bureau, the city has an area of 5.7 square miles (14.8 km^{2}), of which 5.1 square miles (13.3 km^{2}) is land, and 0.23 square miles (0.6 km^{2}) (comprising 10.05%) is water. Poughkeepsie lies approximately 75 miles (121 km) north of the north end of Manhattan. It is 73.5 miles (118.3 km) south of the New York state capital of Albany. The highest elevation of Poughkeepsie is 380 feet (120 m) above sea level on College Hill. Its lowest is on the Hudson River.

Poughkeepsie makes up a part of the Kiryas Joel–Poughkeepsie–Newburgh metropolitan statistical area, which is a part of the wider NY-NJ-CT combined statistical area.

=== Historic districts ===
- Academy Street Historic District
- Balding Avenue Historic District
- Dwight–Hooker Avenue Historic District
- Garfield Place Historic District
- Mill Street–North Clover Street Historic District
- Mount Carmel District
- Union Street Historic District

=== Climate ===
Poughkeepsie has a humid continental climate (Köppen Dfa) with relatively hot summers and cold winters. It receives approximately 44.12 in (1,121 mm) of precipitation per year, much of which is delivered in the late spring and early summer. Due to its inland location, Poughkeepsie can be very cold during the winter, with temperatures dropping below 0 °F (−18 °C) a few times per year. Poughkeepsie can also be hit by powerful nor'easters, but it usually receives significantly less snow or rain from these storms compared to locations towards the south and east. Extremes range from −30 °F (−34 °C) on January 21, 1961, to 106 °F (41 °C) on July 15, 1995.

Climate data for Poughkeepsie, New York (Hudson Valley Regional Airport), 1991–2020 normals, extremes 1931–present
Month	Jan	Feb	Mar	Apr	May	Jun	Jul	Aug	Sep	Oct	Nov	Dec	Year
Record high °F (°C)	70 (21)	76 (24)	86 (30)	94 (34)	98 (37)	102 (39)	103 (39)	104 (40)	101 (38)	91 (33)	82 (28)	72 (22)	104 (40)
Mean daily maximum °F (°C)	36.0 (2.2)	38.9 (3.8)	47.9 (8.8)	60.6 (15.9)	71.3 (21.8)	79.8 (26.6)	84.8 (29.3)	82.8 (28.2)	75.3 (24.1)	63.3 (17.4)	51.4 (10.8)	40.5 (4.7)	61.0 (16.1)
Daily mean °F (°C)	27.1 (−2.7)	29.2 (−1.6)	37.6 (3.1)	49.0 (9.4)	59.5 (15.3)	68.4 (20.2)	73.6 (23.1)	71.7 (22.1)	63.9 (17.7)	52.2 (11.2)	41.5 (5.3)	32.1 (0.1)	50.5 (10.3)
Mean daily minimum °F (°C)	18.2 (−7.7)	19.5 (−6.9)	27.4 (−2.6)	37.5 (3.1)	47.7 (8.7)	57.1 (13.9)	62.3 (16.8)	60.7 (15.9)	52.5 (11.4)	41.1 (5.1)	31.6 (−0.2)	23.8 (−4.6)	40.0 (4.4)
Record low °F (°C)	−30 (−34)	−23 (−31)	−13 (−25)	13 (−11)	26 (−3)	35 (2)	43 (6)	38 (3)	26 (−3)	18 (−8)	3 (−16)	−23 (−31)	−30 (−34)
Average precipitation inches (mm)	2.82 (72)	2.21 (56)	3.09 (78)	3.62 (92)	3.47 (88)	3.91 (99)	3.78 (96)	4.28 (109)	4.33 (110)	3.73 (95)	3.27 (83)	3.39 (86)	41.90 (1,064)
Average precipitation days (≥ 0.01 in)	9.5	9.8	11.2	11.2	12.6	12.9	11.3	11.7	10.5	10.5	10.0	11.1	132.3
Source: NOAA

== Demographics ==
Historical population
Census	Pop.	Note	%±
1850	11,511		—
1860	14,726		27.9%
1870	20,080		36.4%
1880	20,207		0.6%
1890	22,206		9.9%
1900	24,029		8.2%
1910	27,936		16.3%
1920	35,000		25.3%
1930	34,288		−2.0%
1940	40,478		18.1%
1950	41,023		1.3%
1960	38,330		−6.6%
1970	32,029		−16.4%
1980	29,757		−7.1%
1990	28,844		−3.1%
2000	29,871		3.6%
2010	32,736		9.6%
2020	31,577		−3.5%
U.S. Decennial Census

=== Racial and ethnic composition ===
Poughkeepsie city, New York – Racial and ethnic composition Note: the US Census treats Hispanic/Latino as an ethnic category. This table excludes Latinos from the racial categories and assigns them to a separate category. Hispanics/Latinos may be of any race.
Race / Ethnicity (NH = Non-Hispanic)	Pop 2000	Pop 2010	Pop 2020	% 2000	% 2010	% 2020
White alone (NH)	14,706	14,252	10,853	49.23%	43.54%	34.37%
Black or African American alone (NH)	10,354	10,407	11,165	34.66%	31.79%	35.36%
Native American or Alaska Native alone (NH)	71	71	64	0.24%	0.22%	0.20%
Asian alone (NH)	480	521	505	1.61%	1.59%	1.60%
Native Hawaiian or Pacific Islander alone (NH)	11	14	12	0.04%	0.04%	0.04%
Other race alone (NH)	95	86	214	0.32%	0.26%	0.68%
Mixed race or Multiracial (NH)	977	1,001	1,659	3.27%	3.06%	5.25%
Hispanic or Latino (any race)	3,177	6,384	7,105	10.64%	19.50%	22.50%
Total	29,871	32,736	31,577	100.00%	100.00%	100.00%

=== 2020 census ===
As of the 2020 census, Poughkeepsie had a population of 31,577. The median age was 37.5 years. 21.9% of residents were under the age of 18 and 16.2% of residents were 65 years of age or older. For every 100 females there were 90.6 males, and for every 100 females age 18 and over there were 87.0 males age 18 and over.

100.0% of residents lived in urban areas, while 0.0% lived in rural areas.

There were 13,139 households in Poughkeepsie, of which 27.5% had children under the age of 18 living in them. Of all households, 25.5% were married-couple households, 24.7% were households with a male householder and no spouse or partner present, and 41.4% were households with a female householder and no spouse or partner present. About 38.3% of all households were made up of individuals and 13.7% had someone living alone who was 65 years of age or older.

There were 14,604 housing units, of which 10.0% were vacant. The homeowner vacancy rate was 1.5% and the rental vacancy rate was 6.8%.

Racial composition as of the 2020 census
Race	Number	Percent
White	11,815	37.4%
Black or African American	11,744	37.2%
American Indian and Alaska Native	247	0.8%
Asian	524	1.7%
Native Hawaiian and Other Pacific Islander	13	0.0%
Some other race	3,908	12.4%
Two or more races	3,326	10.5%

=== 2010 census ===
At the 2010 census there were 32,736 people. The population density was 5,806.2 inhabitants per square mile (2,241.8/km^{2}). There were 13,153 housing units at an average density of 2,556.6 per square mile (987.1/km^{2}). The racial makeup of the city was 52.8% White, 35.7% Black or African American, 10.6% Hispanic or Latino of any race, 1.6% Asian, 0.4% Native American, 5.3% from other races, and 4.1% from two or more races.

There were 12,014 households, out of which 28.3% had children under the age of 18 living with them, 29.8% were married couples living together, 19.7% had a female householder with no husband present, and 45.4% were non-families. 35.4% of all households were made up of individuals, and 13.2% had someone living alone who was 65 years of age or older. The average household size was 2.40 and the average family size was 3.15.

In the city, the population was spread out, with 25.9% under the age of 18, 12.2% from 18 to 24, 29.2% from 25 to 44, 19.0% from 45 to 64, and 13.6% who were 65 years of age or older. The median age was 33 years. For every 100 females, there were 91.7 males. For every 100 females age 18 and over, there were 88.0 males.

The median household income in the city was $29,389, and the median income for a family was $35,779. Males had a median income of $31,956 versus $25,711 for females. The per capita income for the city was $16,759. About 18.4% of families and 22.7% of the population were below the poverty line, including 30.3% of those under age 18 and 13.8% of those age 65 or over.

=== Religion ===
Per Sperling's BestPlaces, nearly 54% of Poughkeepsie and its surrounding area have religious affiliation. The largest Christian organization is the Catholic Church (37.8%), served by the Latin Church Archdiocese of New York. The second and third largest Christian organizations are Methodism (2.6%) and Presbyterianism (2.0%), and fourth, Anglicanism/Episcopalianism (1.7%). Anglicans or Episcopalians within the city limits and surrounding area are primarily served by the Episcopal Diocese of New York.

The fifth largest Christian group is Pentecostalism (1.3%), followed by Lutheranism (1.1%), the Baptist Church (0.9%), the Latter-Day Saints (0.3%), and Christians of other denominations including the Eastern Orthodox and United Church of Christ (2.7%). The second largest religious group outside of Christianity is Islam (2.4%). The Islamic community primarily identifies with Sunni Islam in the area. Following Islam, 0.8% of the population profess Judaism and 0.1% practice an eastern religion.

== Economy ==
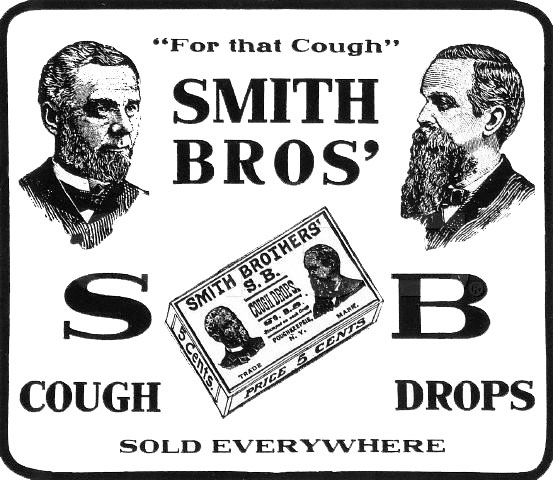
Smith Brothers

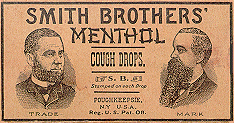
Smith Brothers menthol, introduced in 1922

As of 2020, the dominant industries in Poughkeepsie are healthcare, retail, education, science and technology, finance, and manufacturing. The arts community is part of the current wave or revitalization in Poughkeepsie with creative people moving from New York City and elsewhere, affectionately called "Poughkipsters."

IBM has a large campus in the adjacent town of Poughkeepsie. It was once referred to as IBM's "Main Plant", although much of the workforce has been moved elsewhere in the company (2008). The site once built the IBM 700/7000 series of computers as well as the IBM 7030 Stretch computer and later, together with the Endicott site, IBM mainframes. The RS/6000 SP2 family of computers, which came to fame after one of them won a chess match against world chess master Garry Kasparov, were also manufactured by IBM Poughkeepsie. In October 2008, IBM's Poughkeepsie facility was named "Assembly Plant of the Year 2008" by the editors of Assembly Magazine. Poughkeepsie remains IBM's primary design and manufacturing center for its newest mainframes and high-end Power Systems servers, and it is also one of IBM's major software development centers for z/OS and for other products. According to IBM, as of 2024, its Quantum Data Center in Poughkeepsie operates "the highest number of available utility-scale quantum computers at a single location in the world."

Until 1972, Poughkeepsie was home to the Smith Brothers cough drop factory. The Smith Brothers' gravesite is in the Poughkeepsie Rural Cemetery.

== Media ==
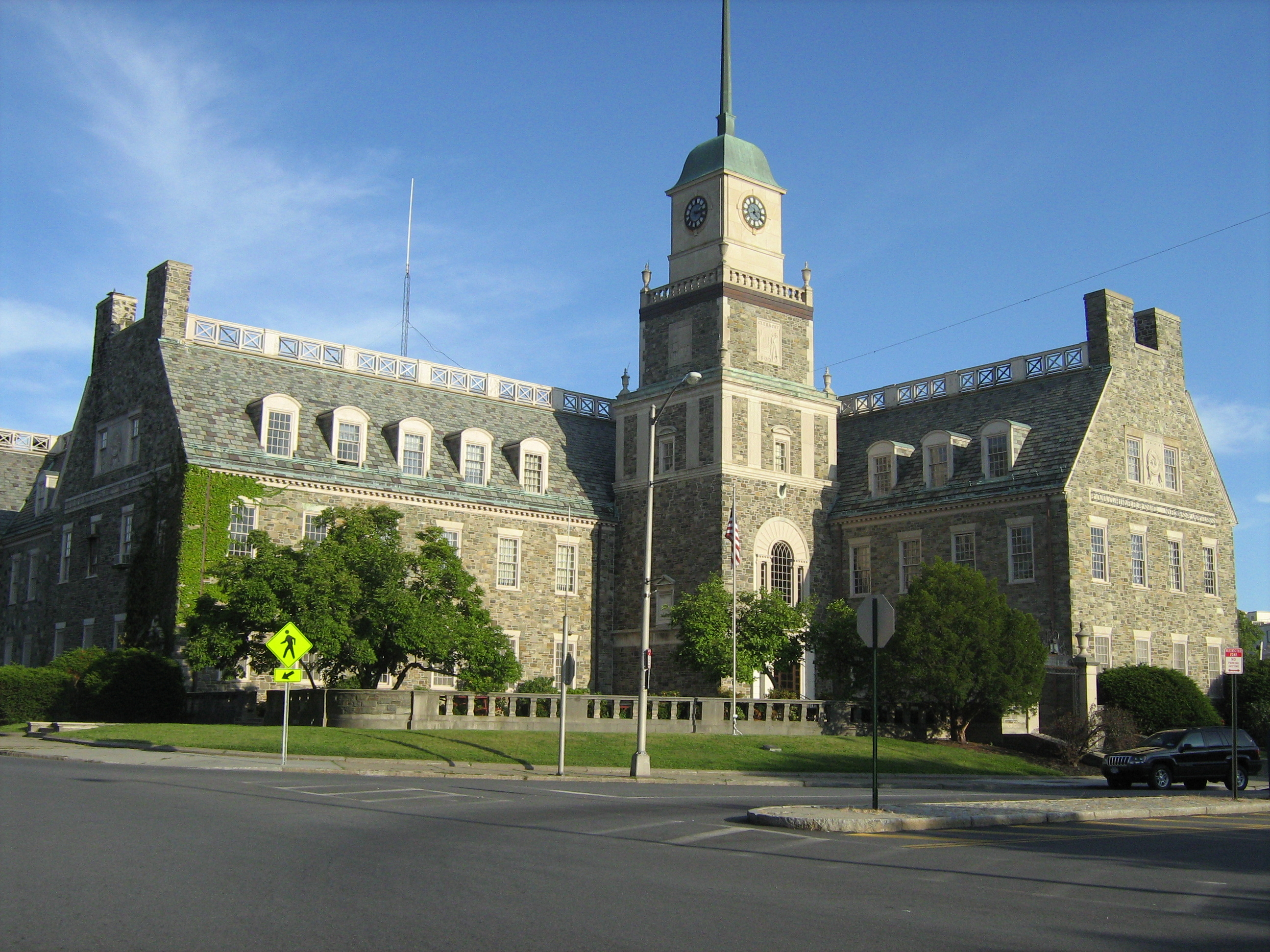
Historic headquarters of the Poughkeepsie Journal

Poughkeepsie and Dutchess County are within the media market of the New York—New Jersey—Connecticut combined statistical area, though the Poughkeepsie Journal, the second-oldest active newspaper in the United States, is based in the city. It is owned by the Gannett chain.

News 12 Hudson Valley is a regional television channel targeting Poughkeepsie and the Hudson Valley region.

FM radio stations in the area are:

- WRRV-96.9 (alternative rock)
- WPDH-101.5 (album-oriented rock)
- WRHV-88.7 (classical music, and NPR affiliate)
- WCZX-97.7 (country)
- WKXP-94.3 (soft adult contemporary)
- WRWD-FM-107.3 (country)
- WSPK-104.7 (top 40)
- WHUD-100.7 (adult contemporary)
- WDST-100.1 (independent rock)
- WPKF-96.1 (top 40)
- WVKR-FM-91.3 (Vassar College radio)
- WRNQ-92.1 ('80s to current music)

AM radio stations in the area are:

- WEOK-1390 (oldies)
- WGNY-1220 (sports)
- WHVW-950 ('50s and older blues and country)
- WKIP-1450 (talk radio)

== Education ==
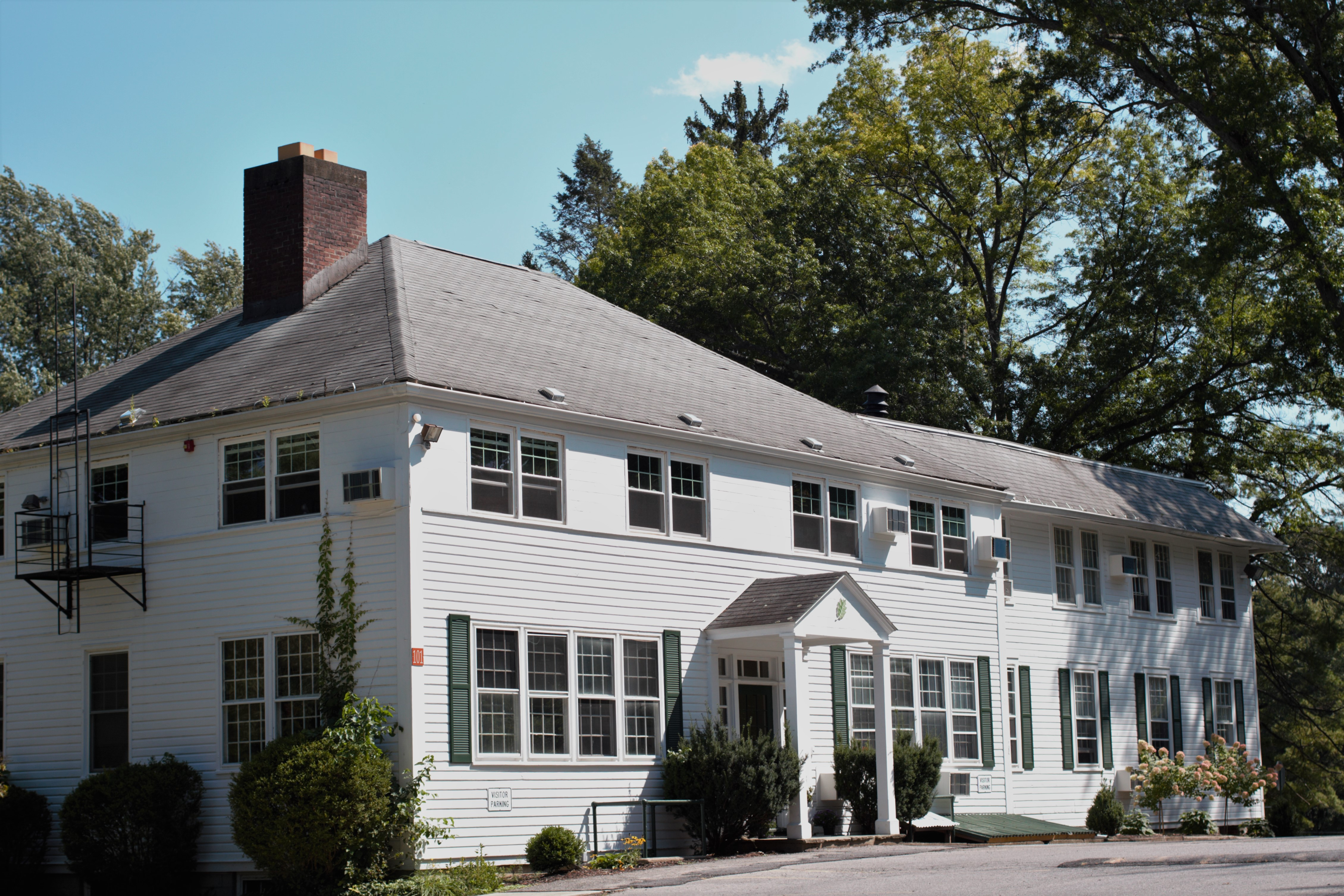
Oakwood Friends School

The Poughkeepsie City School District is the public K–12 school system, serving approximately 5,000 students.

The Oakwood Friends School is a co-ed boarding and day school serving approximately 170 students, grades 5–12, located outside city limits in the town of Poughkeepsie. It is the oldest college preparatory school in New York State, founded in 1796. Oakwood was founded on the Quaker principles of Simplicity, Peace, Integrity, Community, Equality, and Stewardship. Poughkeepsie Day School, also outside the city, is a progressive co-ed pre-K-through-12 day school serving approximately 140 students, founded in 1934 by local families and members of the Vassar College faculty. Other private schools in the area include Tabernacle Christian Academy and Our Lady of Lourdes High School.

Spackenkill Union Free School District, comprising generally the southern part of the town of Poughkeepsie, consists of Hagan Elementary School, Nassau Elementary School, Orville A. Todd Middle School, and Spackenkill High School.

Arlington Central School District, covers substantial parts of Poughkeepsie as well as parts of the towns of Beekman, La Grange, Pleasant Valley, and Union Vale.

=== Colleges and universities ===
There are no institutions of higher learning operating within the city limits, however Dutchess Community College, Marist University, and Vassar College are all located just outside the city in the surrounding Town of Poughkeepsie. In addition, Adelphi University's Hudson Valley Center located at Mid-Hudson Regional Hospital offers a Master of Social Work.

Colleges formerly located in Poughkeepsie were the Ridley-Lowell Business and Technical Institute, which closed in 2018, and the Eastman Business College (1859–1931).

== Public safety ==
=== Fire ===
The city is protected by the career firefighters in the City of Poughkeepsie Fire Department. By keeping buildings up to code, controlling illegal occupancies, monitoring the safety of living areas and issuing licenses and permits, the department works to limit the potential for dangerous situations and the occurrences of fire hazards. The Poughkeepsie Fire Department operates out of three fire stations, located throughout the city, and operates and maintains a fire apparatus fleet of four engines, including one reserve engine; two ladder trucks; one rescue vehicle, cross-staffed as needed; and one fireboat. The Arlington Fire District, Fairview Fire District, and New Hamburg Fire Department cover the surrounding town of Poughkeepsie. The Fire Department is capable of handling fires, rescues, extractions and natural disasters. It is a certified Emergency Medical Services first responder fire department and first responder to calls with Mobile Life Support Services.

=== Police ===
Police protection to the city is provided by the City of Poughkeepsie Police Department. The police department has over 125 employees, including 96 sworn police officers and 34 civilians, of which 13 are emergency dispatchers. The Police Department also operate a Citizen Observer Alert Network to keep citizens informed about local crime, emergency situations, and other important information. The Dutchess County Sheriff's Office is based in Poughkeepsie and is adjacent to the Dutchess County Jail, which houses around 250 inmates maximum capacity at any time, with the same number of inmates housed at out-of-county facilities.

The third City of Poughkeepsie police officer to be killed in the line of duty was John M. Falcone on February 18, 2011. Police responded to a train station where 27-year-old Lee Welch had shot and killed his estranged wife and Falcone spotted Welch leaving the scene with their 3-year-old child. Officers managed to take the child away from Welch, but in the ensuing struggle, Welch fatally shot Falcone in the head with his own service weapon before he died by suicide. Multiple efforts were made to memorialize Falcone after his death, such as renaming the road where he was killed to Detective John Falcone Memorial Avenue, designating a section of U.S. Route 9 in Poughkeepsie the John M. Falcone Memorial Highway, and by hosting an annual motorcycle ride in his honor.

=== Medical ===
Poughkeepsie is home to Vassar Brothers Medical Center, a 365-bed hospital situated next to U.S. Route 9 on Reade Place. The hospital has an advanced birthing center and a Level III Neonatal Intensive Care Unit. Vassar Brothers Medical Center is owned and operated by Nuvance Health (formerly HealthQuest), a local nonprofit collection of hospitals and healthcare providers.

Emergency medical services are provided by Empress Ambulance Company, which are contracted to provide full-time ambulance coverage to the city. They provide paramedic level service, including advanced life support, and have ambulances stationed in the city on Pershing Avenue. Mobile Life also has a staff of specially trained paramedics that provide tactical Emergency Medical Services support to the city police during ESU/SWAT operations, as well as emergency responses for the Fire Department via their Special Operations Response Team. They also provide advanced life support ambulance service to other agencies and municipalities in Dutchess, Ulster, and Orange counties, and their headquarters building is located in New Windsor in Orange County.

== Culture ==
=== Sports ===
The Hudson Valley Renegades is a minor league baseball team affiliated with the New York Yankees. The team is a member of the South Atlantic League, and play at Dutchess Stadium in the nearby town of Fishkill.

The Hudson Valley Hawks were a team in the National Professional Basketball League until 2009 when the league disbanded. The team's home court was at Beacon High School, located approximately 16 miles (26 km) south in the city of Beacon.

The Hudson Valley Highlanders of the North American Football League played their home games at Dietz Stadium in nearby Kingston.

Poughkeepsie hosted a founding member of the North Eastern Hockey League with the formation of the Poughkeepsie Panthers in 2003. However, due to financial problems, the team only played for one season and became the Connecticut Cougars the following year. The league folded due to financial problems in January 2008. Subsequently, the city was home to the Hudson Valley Bears, one of four founding members of the Eastern Professional Hockey League, for one season. Both teams played their home games at the McCann Ice Arena in the Mid-Hudson Civic Center.

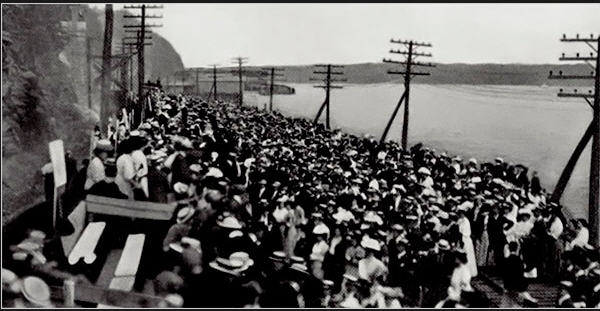
Spectators at the 1907 Poughkeepsie Regatta

One of Poughkeepsie's most notable sports events was the annual Poughkeepsie Regatta of the Intercollegiate Rowing Association, which was held on the Hudson River from 1895 to 1949. The top college teams would attend along with tens of thousands of spectators. Poughkeepsie was known as the rowing capital of the world. Spectators watched from the hills and bluffs overlooking the river and from chartered boats and trains that followed the races along the entire length of the course; which were longer than present-day races, with varsity eights rowing a 4-mile (6.4 km) race. When the rowing association moved the regatta to other venues, the Mid-Hudson Rowing Association was formed to preserve rowing in the area. It successfully lobbied to preserve the regatta's facilities for use by area high schools and club rowing programs. As part of the 400th anniversary celebration of Henry Hudson's trip up the Hudson River a recreation of the regatta was held with Marist College Crew as its host. The events included a fireworks display, a large dinner, and the unveiling of the restored historic Cornell Boathouse, now property of Marist Crew. Historically accurate, the four mile long course started off Rogers Point in Hyde Park and ended about a mile south of the Poughkeepsie-Highland Railroad Bridge. Competitors included Marist, Vassar, Army, Penn, Navy, Syracuse, Columbia and Cornell. Notably this was the first time women's crew teams were allowed to participate in the historic Poughkeepsie Regatta.

Established British racing team Carlin Motorsport have chosen Poughkeepsie as their U.S. base whilst racing in Indy Lights.

=== Arts and entertainment ===
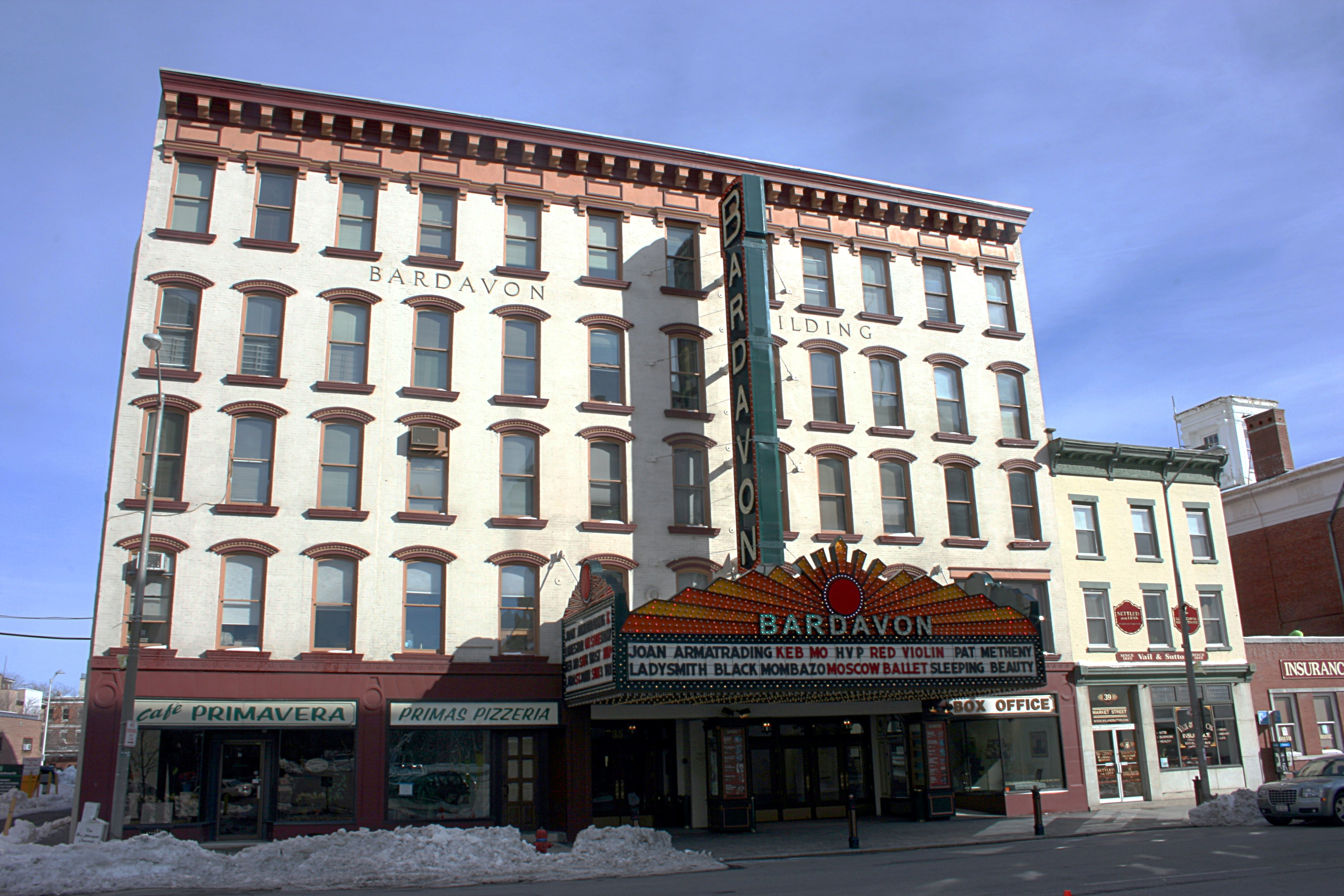
The Bardavon 1869 Opera House

Poughkeepsie has a number of notable institutions for arts and entertainment. The Bardavon 1869 Opera House, located on Market Street just below Main Street, is a theater that has an array of music, drama, dance, and film events and is the home of the Hudson Valley Philharmonic.

The Mid-Hudson Civic Center, located down the street from the Bardavon 1869 Opera House, hosts concerts, professional wrestling and trade shows and has an ice rink next door for ice hockey. From July 1984 to August 5, 1986, the Civic Center was the location for filming WWF Championship Wrestling.

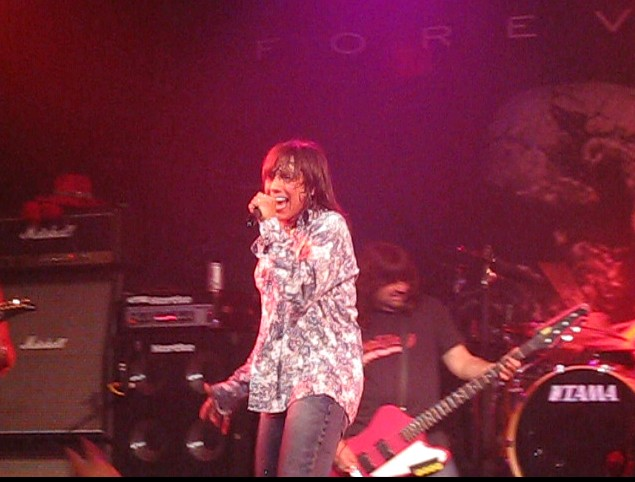
The band Tesla at The Chance in Poughkeepsie, NY

The Chance, located at 6 Crannell Street in downtown Poughkeepsie, hosts live rock concerts with local as well as major artists.

The collections of the Frances Lehman Loeb Art Center at Vassar College chart the history of art from antiquity to the present and comprise over 21,000 works, including paintings, sculptures, prints, and photographs.

The Barrett Art Center at 55 Noxon Street offers exhibits, classes, and lectures on the visual arts.

Locust Grove, the home of Samuel Morse and a National Historic Landmark, features paintings by Morse, as well as historically important examples of telegraph technology.

For shopping and movie theater entertainment, the Poughkeepsie Galleria is located in the town of Poughkeepsie, southeast of the hamlet of Crown Heights and north of Wappingers Falls. The mall, which opened in 1987, consists of two floors with 250 shops, restaurants, and a multi-plex theater with 16 screens.

The Mid-Hudson Children's Museum is located at 75 North Water Street.

The Cunneen-Hackett Arts Center at 9 and 12 Vassar Street provides venues for music, dance and the visual arts.

Bananas Comedy Club is a comedy club that presents comedians such as Jim Norton, Rich Vos, Patrice O'Neal, and Nick DiPaolo. Jimmy Fallon started his career performing at the club.

Joseph Bertolozzi's Bridge Music is a sound-art installation on the Mid-Hudson Bridge.

=== Library ===
The Poughkeepsie Public Library District serves the City and Town of Poughkeepsie through a special legislative library district established in 1988. The Library District's main library Adriance Memorial Library, is located on Market Street in the City of Poughkeepsie. Another City branch, the Sadie Peterson Delaney African Roots Branch Library, is located in the Family Partnership Center on North Hamilton Street. The Library District has another branch library in the Town of Poughkeepsie, the Boardman Road Branch Library, along with a mobile library service called Rover.

== Transportation ==
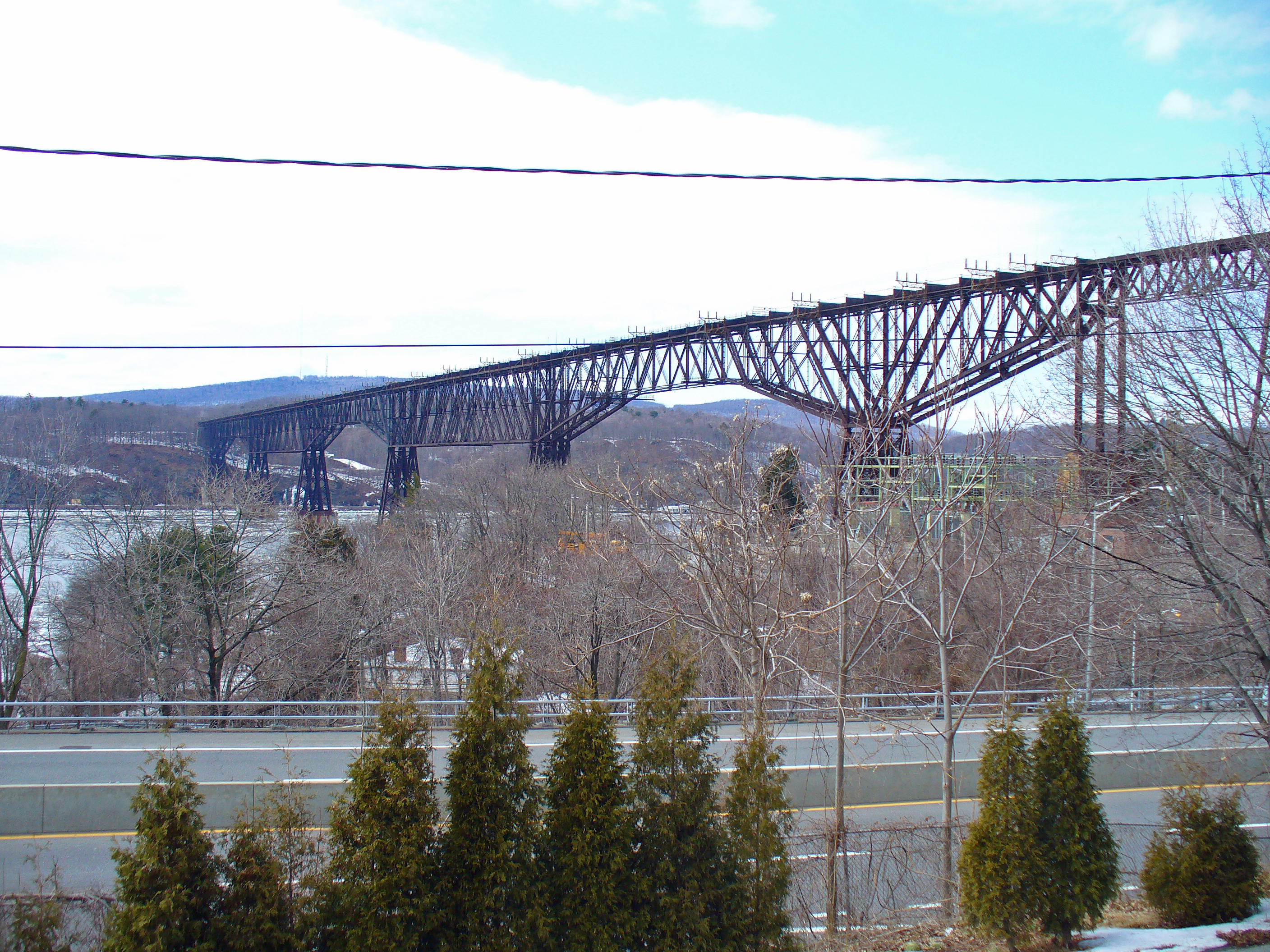
Walkway over the Hudson in Poughkeepsie

Poughkeepsie sits at the junction of the north–south US 9 and east–west US 44 and NY 55 highways.

Rail commuter service to New York City is provided at the Poughkeepsie Metro-North station by the MTA's Metro-North Railroad. Poughkeepsie is the northern terminus of Metro-North's Hudson Line. Amtrak also serves the station, along the Hudson River south to New York Penn Station and north along the river to Albany-Rensselaer station and points further north and west. Amtrak trains serving Poughkeepsie are the Adirondack, Empire Service, Ethan Allen Express, Maple Leaf, and Lake Shore Limited.

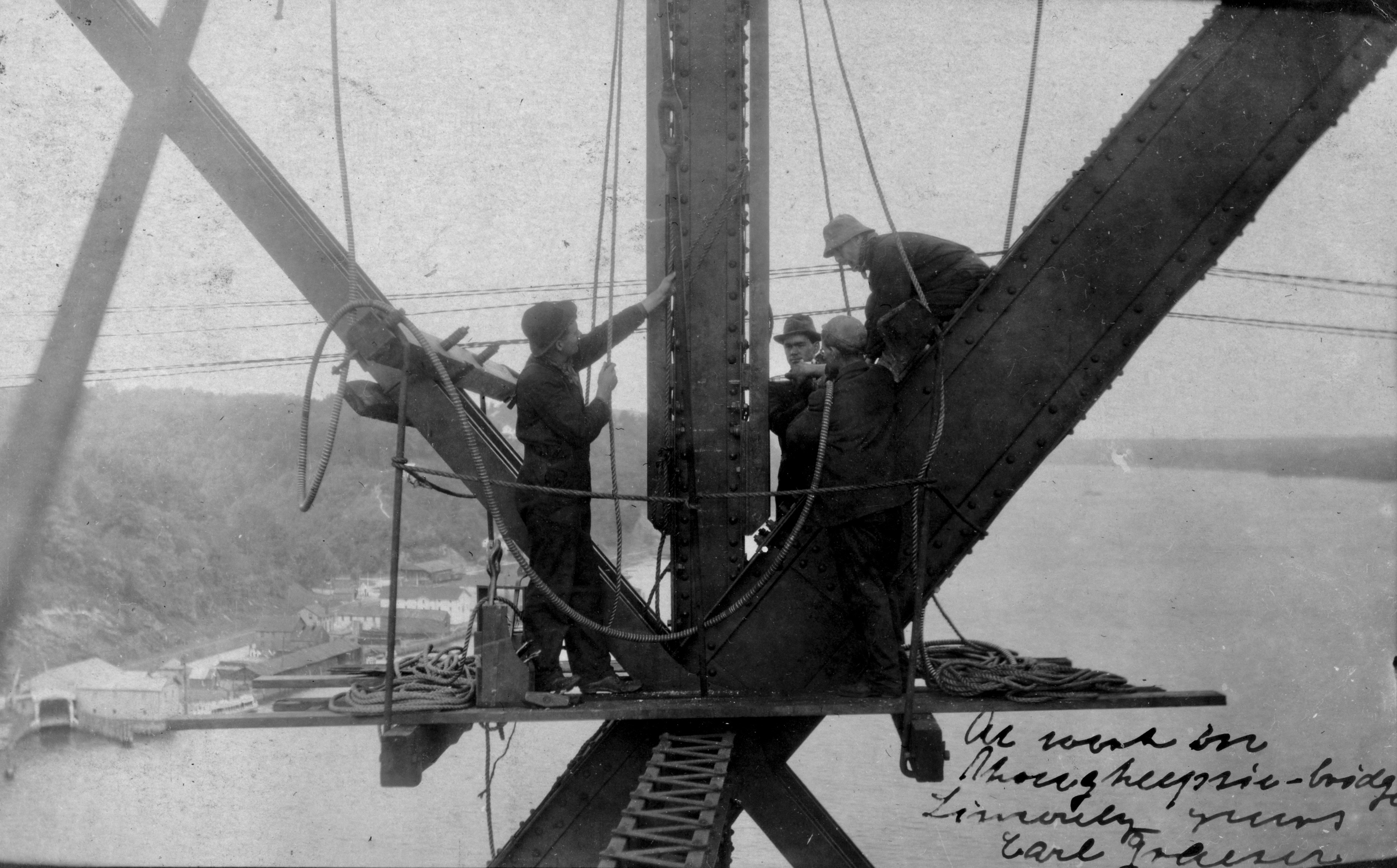
Poughkeepsie Bridge strengthening project, 1906

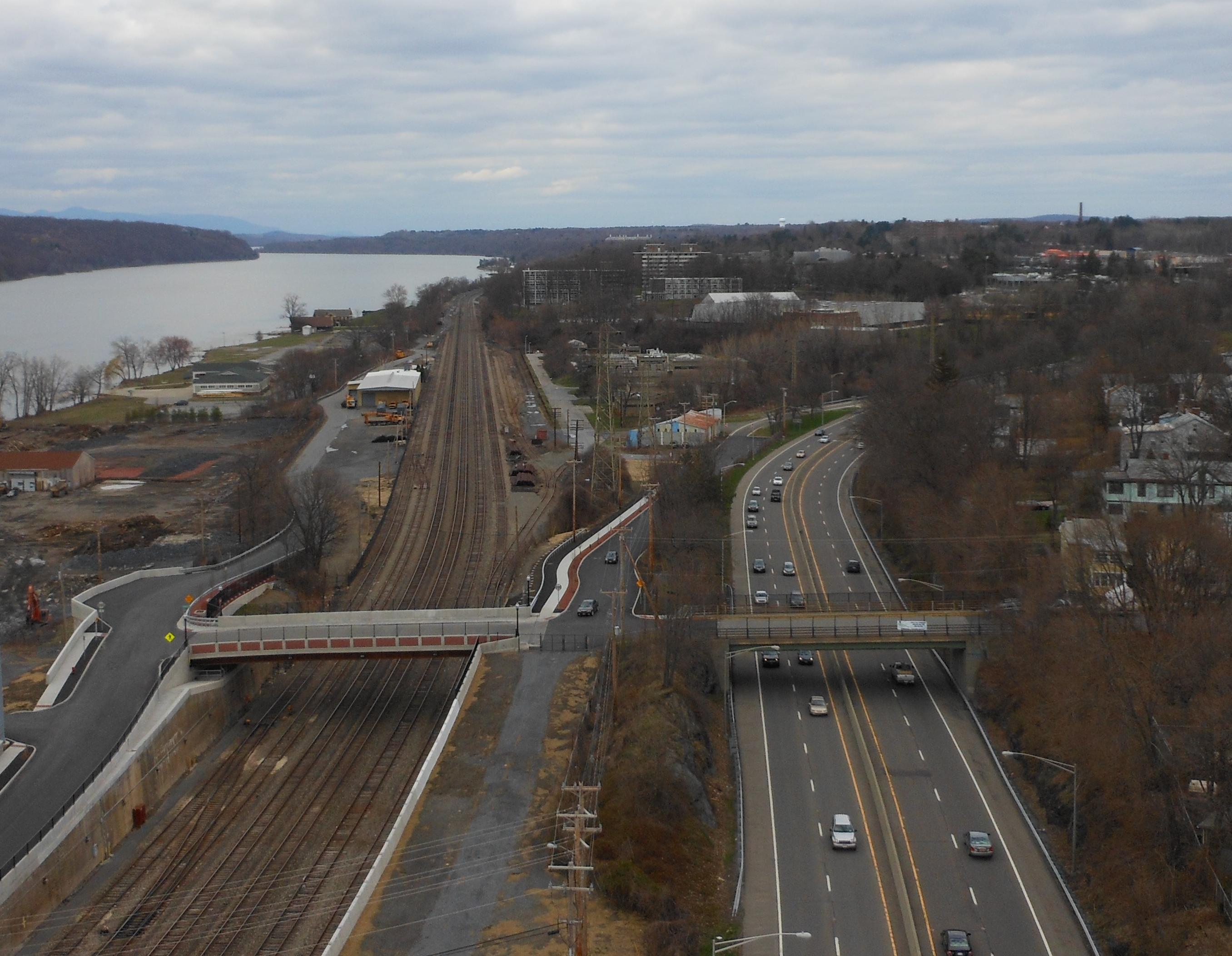
Highways and railroad tracks in Poughkeepsie

The Mid-Hudson Bridge, opened in 1930, carries US 44 and NY 55 across the Hudson River from Poughkeepsie to Highland. The Poughkeepsie Bridge opened in 1889 to carry railroad traffic across the Hudson, the usage of the bridge came to an end when a 1974 fire damaged its decking. A local group (Walkway over the Hudson) raised the funds to convert the bridge into a unique linear park connecting rail-trails on both sides of the Hudson River. The Walkway Over The Hudson opened on October 3, 2009, coinciding with the 400th anniversary of Henry Hudson's first exploration of the river named for him. The bridge is now open for pedestrian and bicycle use and is a state historic park.

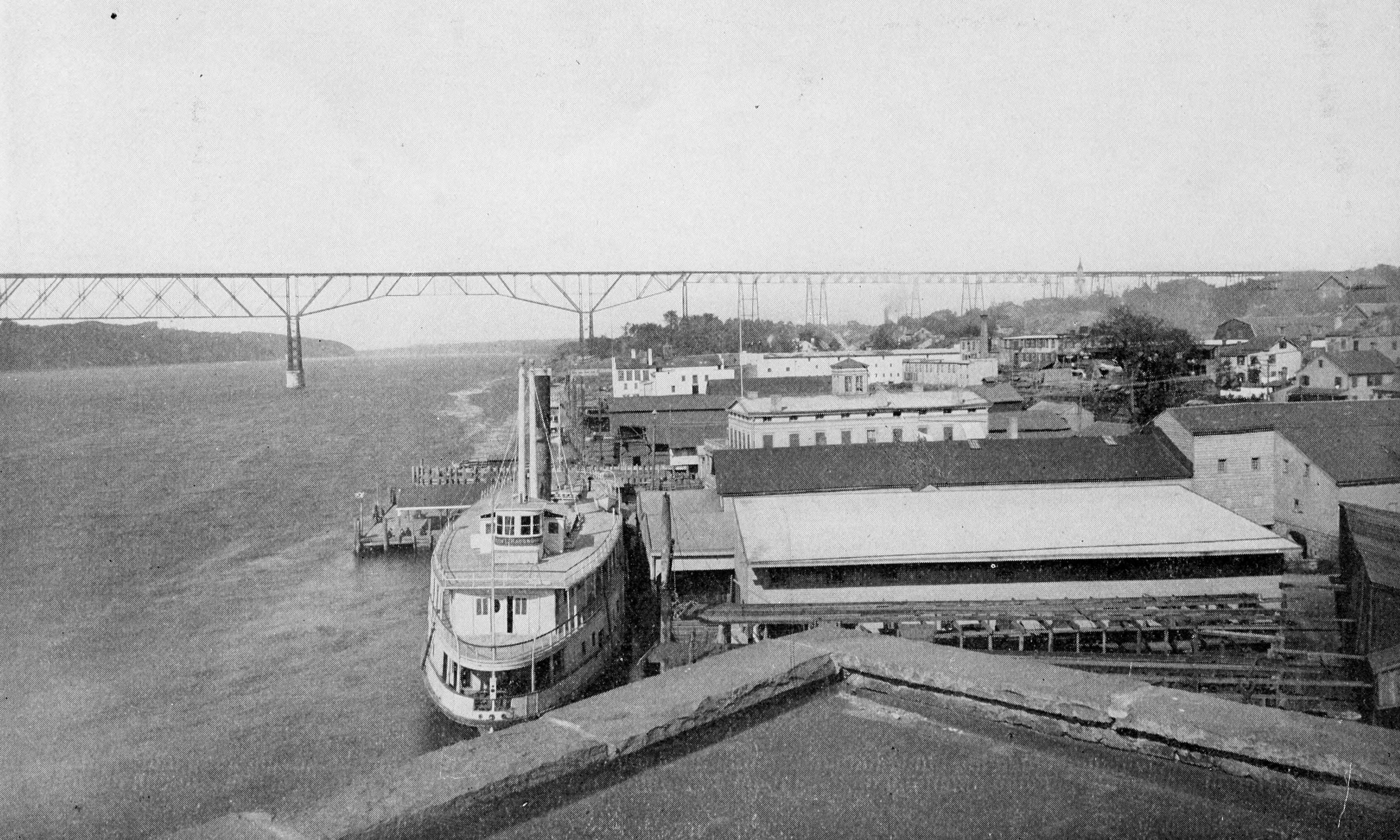
Poughkeepsie Bridge and ferry landing, circa 1897

The Dutchess County Airport in nearby Wappinger serves general aviation, although it once had scheduled air carrier service by Colonial Airlines in the 1950s and regional airline service by Command Airways and others in the 1960s–1980s. The nearest major airport to Poughkeepsie is Stewart International Airport about 25 miles (40 km) south in Newburgh. Other nearby airports include Westchester County Airport approximately 58.1 miles (93.5 km) south, Albany International Airport approximately 85 miles (137 km) north and the three major metropolitan airports for New York City: John F. Kennedy International Airport approximately 88 miles (142 km) south, Newark Liberty International Airport approximately 88 miles (142 km) south, and LaGuardia Airport approximately 80 miles (130 km) south.

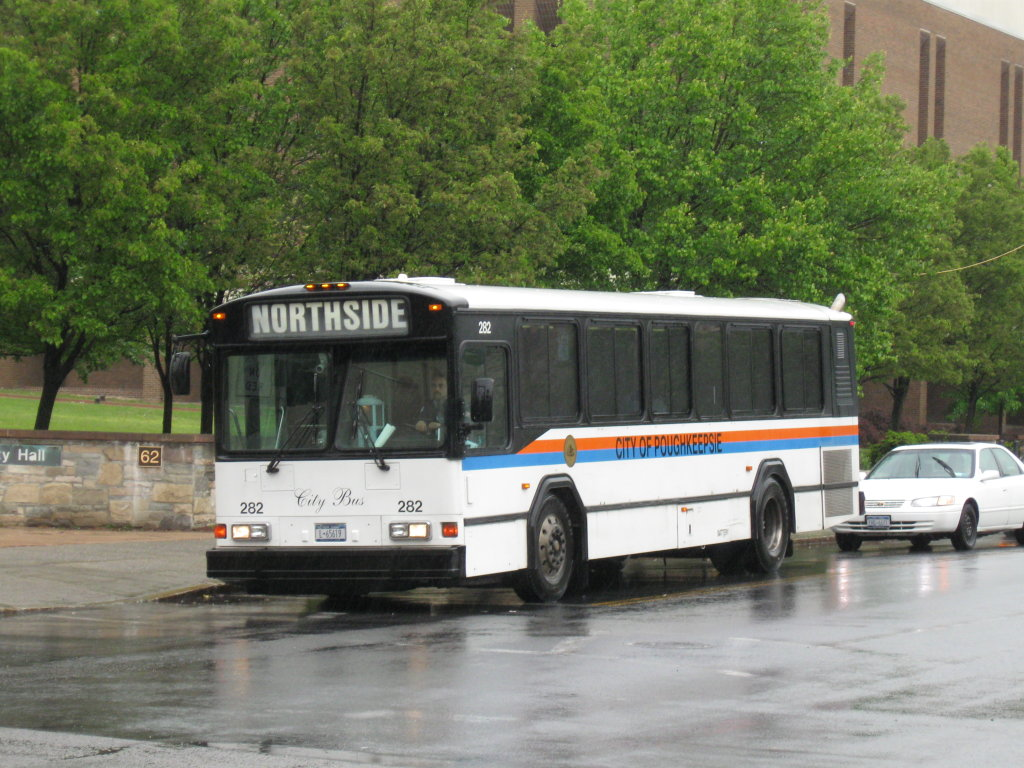
Local bus transit in Poughkeepsie

Bus transit service is provided by Dutchess County Public Transit, operated by Dutchess County, which travels throughout Dutchess County and also serves as the main link to the Route 9 corridor, including Poughkeepsie Galleria and South Hills Mall. A section of the Route 9 corridor within the city was renamed to the "Detective John M. Falcone Memorial Highway" in 2014 by governor Andrew Cuomo to memorialize the city's first police officer slain in the line of duty.

Both services have a quasi-hub at the intersection of Main and Market streets, adjacent to the Mid-Hudson Civic Center and at the west end of the former pedestrian-only Main Mall (the mall was removed in 2001, with those blocks being restored back to traffic and to the name Main Street). Other buses serving this area include Adirondack Trailways, Short Line, commuter runs to White Plains, and a shuttle to New Paltz.

== Notable people ==
- George Appo, pickpocket and con artist - operated a green goods scam in Poughkeepsie for a short period in the 19th century
- Al Baker (1874–1951), magician, ventriloquist, and Dean of the Society of American Magicians from 1941 to 1951
- Ernest Hamlin Baker, American Illustrator
- George G. Barnard, state judge - impeached by the Court for the Trial of Impeachments for events during the Erie War
- Chris Bell, film director/producer
- Joseph Bertolozzi, composer, musician - creator of Bridge Music and Tower Music
- Josh Billings (pen name of Henry Wheeler Shaw), humorist of mid-to-late 19th century
- Jane Bolin, first black woman to serve as a judge in the United States
- Alfred Mosher Butts, architect who invented the board game Scrabble
- Rob Chianelli, drummer for We Are the In Crowd
- Shawn Christensen, Oscar-winning screenwriter, film director, actor, singer-songwriter, painter
- Richard Connell, author
- Philip Schuyler Crooke (1810–1881), U.S. Representative
- Andrew Jackson Davis (1826–1920), known variously as the "Poughkeepsie Seer" or "The Seer of Poughkeepsie"
- Cathy Davis, boxer
- Richard Denning, actor
- Amanda Minnie Douglas (1831–1916), writer
- Bill Duke, actor and film director
- Chris Dyson, motorsport driver
- Martin Faust, actor
- Kendall Francois, serial killer
- Carolyn Garcia, better known as "Mountain Girl", Merry Prankster, and wife of Grateful Dead guitarist Jerry Garcia
- Benjamin A. Gilman, former U.S. congressman
- Alex Goot, YouTube musician
- Tim Herlihy, actor, comedian, screenwriter, producer, and playwright. Frequent collaborator with Adam Sandler
- Dustin Higgs, convicted murderer executed by the United States federal government
- Mela Hudson, actress, producer
- Jonathan Idema, self-proclaimed counter-terrorism expert and covert operations specialist, partially served sentence in Pul-e-Charkhi prison in Afghanistan before being pardoned by Hamid Karzai
- Jeh V. Johnson, architect and educator
- Tibor Kalman, graphic designer, emigrated from Hungary to Poughkeepsie as a child
- Hevad Khan, poker player
- G. Gordon Liddy, key figure in Watergate scandal
- Keith Lockhart, conductor of Boston Pops Orchestra
- Bartlett Marshall Low, Minnesota state legislator, businessman
- Terry MacAlmon, Christian musician
- Jocko Maggiacomo, motorsport driver
- Joe McPhee, jazz musician, multi-instrumentalist
- Johnny Miller, pioneering aviator, brother of Lee Miller
- Lee Miller, fashion model, World War II photographer and correspondent, sister of Johnny Miller
- Alison Mountz, political geographer
- Sergio Rossetti Morosini, artist, conservator
- Sterling Morrison, guitarist for The Velvet Underground
- Anna Morton, Second Lady of the United States between 1889 and 1893
- Billy Name, photographer, filmmaker, artist and collaborator of Andy Warhol
- Homer Augustus Nelson, lawyer, Congressman, Secretary of State of New York, colonel in the Union Army
- Michelle Nijhuis, science journalist
- Frank Owens, pianist, arranger, composer, and conductor
- Mark Parker, president/CEO of Nike, Inc.
- Edmund Platt, former U.S. Representative
- Charlie Plummer, actor
- Dave Price, WNBC-TV weatherman
- William Radford (1814–1870), former U.S. Representative
- Barbara Rhoades, film/television actress
- Richard Rinaldi, NBA guard
- Robert Sheckley, author, Hugo and Nebula award nominee
- Leonard B. Smith, jazz cornetist, composer
- Charles Spencer, professional football offensive tackle
- Monty Stickles, AFL/NFL football player
- David Strathairn, actor
- Debi Thomas, figure skater - 1986 world champion and bronze medallist at the 1988 Olympic
- Matthew Vassar, founder of Vassar College in 1861
- Riley Weston, screenwriter - best known for Felicity
- Andre Williams, NFL running back, 2013 Heisman Trophy finalist
- Cory Wong, musician
- Ed Wood, film director

=== Scientists and inventors ===
- Sara Josephine Baker, physician, inventor of infant formula
- William Henry Brewer (1828–1910), chemist, geologist and botanist
- Alfred Mosher Butts, architect, inventor of the board game, Scrabble
- Donald Klein, chemist, inventor of MOSFET transistor
- Calvin D. MacCracken, inventor
- Harold J. Morowitz (1927–2016), biophysicist
- Samuel Slocum, inventor
- William Wallace Smith 2nd, chemist, co-inventor of the first cough drops produced and advertised in the United States

=== Major League Baseball players ===
- Frank Bahret
- Tommy Boggs
- Buttons Briggs
- Frank Cimorelli
- Bill Daley
- Ricky Horton
- Fred Lasher
- Mickey McDermott
- Jeff Pierce
- Elmer Steele

=== Bands ===
- Against the Current (pop rock)
- Genghis Tron (grind/math metal)
- Matchbook Romance (emo punk)
- Pound (rock)
- Shai Hulud (hardcore metal)
- That's Outrageous! (metalcore)
- We Are the In Crowd (pop punk)

== See also ==
- List of newspapers in New York in the 18th century: Poughkeepsie
- National Register of Historic Places listings in Poughkeepsie, New York
- Thomas Dongan, 2nd Earl of Limerick
