= Cloak of Love =

EP by Genghis Tron
- Released: February 15, 2005
- Recorded: August 21–25, 2004
- Studios: The Pain Cave in Brooklyn, New York
- Genres: Cybergrind, mathcore
- Length: 12:43
- Labels: Crucial Blast, Lovepump United (vinyl)
- Producer: Colin Marston

Genghis Tron chronology
Laser Bitch (2004)	Cloak of Love (2005)	Cape of Hate (2006)

Professional ratings
Review scores
Source	Rating
AllMusic	3.5/5 stars

Cloak of Love is the first EP by Genghis Tron, released in 2005. It focuses solely on electronic music and mathcore, unlike later releases.

The songs "Rock Candy," "Ride the Steambolt" (under the name "Penultimate Just Means Second to Last, You Pretentious Fuck"), and "Laser Bitch" (under the name "Dance, Laser Bitch!") previously appeared on the Laser Bitch demo.

== Track listing ==
All tracks are written by Genghis Tron.

No.	Title	Length
1.	"Rock Candy"	3:05
2.	"Arms"	2:38
3.	"Ride the Steambolt"	1:38
4.	"Laser Bitch" (feat. Jake Friedman)	2:16
5.	"Sing Disorder"	3:06
Total length:		12:43

== Personnel ==
- Mookie Singerman – lead vocals, keyboards, theremin, guitar, lap steel guitar
- Hamilton Jordan – guitar, drum programming, backing vocals
- Michael Sochynsky – keyboards, drum programming

Additional personnel

- Jake Friedman – additional vocals on track 4
- Colin Marston – engineering, production, mixing, mastering
- Jon Beasley – artwork and design
