= Dead Mountain Mouth =

Studio album by Genghis Tron
- Released: June 6, 2006
- Recorded: January 10–19, 2006
- Studios: God City Studios, Salem, MA
- Genres: Cybergrind; progressive metal; IDM
- Length: 31:29
- Labels: Crucial Blast (CD), Lovepump United (vinyl)
- Producer: Kurt Ballou

Genghis Tron chronology
Cape of Hate (2006)	Dead Mountain Mouth (2006)	Triple Black Diamond (2007)

Professional ratings
Review scores
Source	Rating
AllMusic	Positive
Decibel Magazine	(Positive)
DecoyMusic	4.5/5 stars
Dusted Magazine	(Mixed)
Exclaim!	(Positive)
Fake Train	8.5/10 stars
Indieworkshop.com	(Positive)
Ink 19	(Positive)
KPSU	9/10 stars
Prefix Mag	7/10 stars
Punknews.org	4.5/5 stars

Dead Mountain Mouth is the debut full-length album by cybergrind band Genghis Tron. It was released on June 6, 2006, on Crucial Blast in CD format, and on June 27, 2006, on Lovepump United in vinyl format (white and clear coloured). A vinyl reissue of the album was released in late 2008, again on Lovepump United.

== Background ==
The album is more varied than the previous EP, and features the band exploring such genres as doom metal, intelligent dance music (IDM), power noise, experimental rock and grindcore. Both the album and the title track quote and echo T. S. Eliot's poem, The Waste Land, involving pivotal themes of disconnectedness, disharmony and non-fecundity.

== Track listing ==
All tracks are written by Genghis Tron.

No.	Title	Length
1.	"The Folding Road"	3:01
2.	"Chapels"	1:54
3.	"From the Aisle"	3:00
4.	"Dead Mountain Mouth"	2:55
5.	"White Walls"	4:48
6.	"Badlands" (instrumental)	1:31
7.	"Greek Beds"	2:38
8.	"Asleep on the Forest Floor"	4:08
9.	"Warm Woods" (instrumental)	4:03
10.	"Lake of Virgins"	3:31
Total length:		31:29

== Personnel ==
In the album booklet, a note reads "Genghis Tron use guitars, synthesizers, vocals, computers, lap steel, and some bass."

Genghis Tron

- Hamilton Jordan – guitar, bass guitar
- Michael Sochynsky – programming, synthesizers
- Mookie Singerman – vocals, lap steel

Additional musicians

- Mike McKenzie (The Red Chord) – additional vocals on "Dead Mountain Mouth" and "White Walls"
- Jake Friedman – additional vocals on "The Folding Road" and "Asleep on the Forest Floor"
- Greg Weeks – additional bass guitar on "Asleep on the Forest Floor"

Production

- Alan Douches – mastering
- Kurt Ballou – recording, mixing
- Kim Dumas – sequencing
- Jon Beasley – artwork, design
