= Union Street Historic District (Poughkeepsie, New York) =

Historic district in New York, United States

- U.S. National Register of Historic Places
- U.S. Historic district
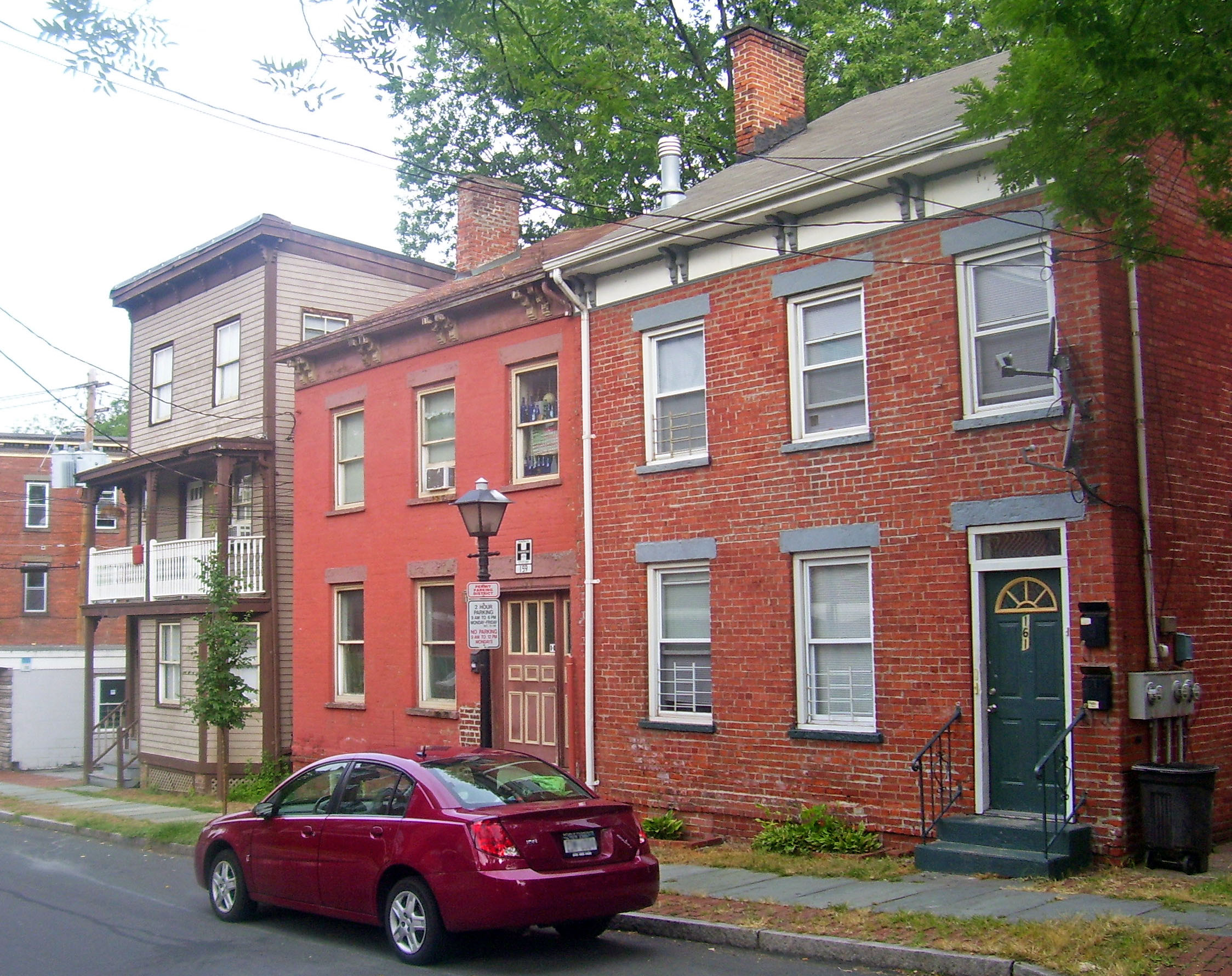
- Typical houses on Union Street, 2008

- Location within New York Location within the United States

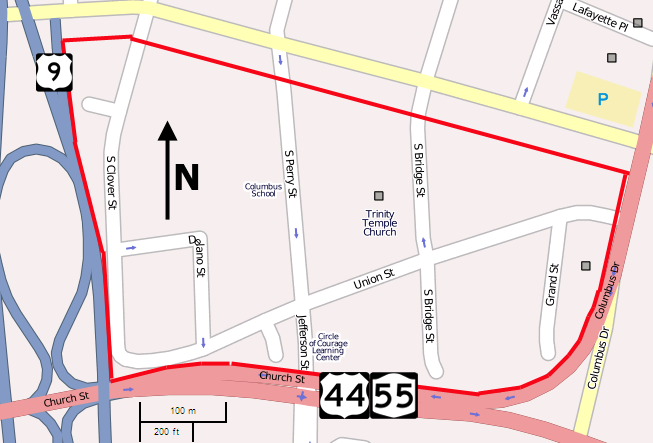
- Map of Union Street Historic District
- Location: Poughkeepsie, NY
- Coordinates: 41°42′11″N 73°56′01″W
- Area: 42 acres (17 ha)
- Built: from 1767
- Architectural style: Federal, Late Victorian
- NRHP reference No.: 71000537
- Added to NRHP: December 9, 1971

The Union Street Historic District in Poughkeepsie, New York, United States, is an area of eight blocks (roughly 42 acres (17 ha)) southwest of downtown and just north of the Mid-Hudson Bridge approaches. It is the oldest neighborhood in the city.

It dates to 1767 when a path to the Hudson River was developed into a street. In 1971 it was designated a historic district and became the first property in the city to be listed on the National Register of Historic Places.

== Geography ==
The district is roughly rectangular. It is bounded on the north by the rear property lines of lots on the south side of Main Street, on the east by the crest of the slope up from the Hudson River (roughly the rear property lines of the west side of Market Street, 200 feet (61 m) above the water), on the south by US 44 and NY 55 (the East-West Arterial) and on the east by US 9 (the North-South Arterial). This eight-block area of 42 acres (17 ha) included, at the time of its Register listing, 173 contributing properties. None of them are separately listed.

Union Street runs across the district roughly west-southwest to east-northeast. Delano and Grand streets are also included in their entirety, and portions of South Bridge, South Clover and South Perry streets are within the district as well.

Topographically, the district slopes down towards the river from east to west. All its streets are developed, with a few vacant lots. Buildings and lots, both the smallest, on average, in any area of the city, are densely clustered, with many having yards in the rear rather than the side. There are many older, taller trees that provide shade and greenery.

== History ==
The street began as a winding footpath connecting the early settlement of Poughkeepsie, around the present-day location of Market Street, to the Union Store on the river. In 1767 it was expanded into the first road from Poughkeepsie to the river. Maps prepared in 1799 show it as Union Store Road.

A neighborhood gradually arose around it, becoming the first residence for many immigrant groups in the city: the Germans, Irish, Poles, Italians, other Slavic groups. Descendants of many of them stayed in the neighborhood for years. In the mid-20th century the area became racially integrated when African-Americans began settling in the area.

Throughout the 19th century builders put up the same general house plan, adapting it only slightly to prevailing architectural styles: a two-and-half-story structure with three-bay facade. This was done first in brick with stone trim, then wood, then in more detailed brickwork. They evolved from having simple steps to the street, to stoops to, at the end of the century, elaborate verandas. Some buildings, usually at the intersections, had businesses at street level.

The houses were located on narrow lots with no sideyards, only a rear yard. This created a strong sense of community, and a division between public and private space. Within this, the oblique angles of the Union Street intersections, and the slope of the land gave each house its own perspective on and within the neighborhood.

By the late 1960s many of the surrounding neighborhoods had been razed for road construction or extensively rebuilt through urban renewal programs. The historic designation made this less likely to happen in the Union Street area, and preserved it as it had been.
