= Board Up the House Remixes Volume 3 =

EP by Genghis Tron
- Released: December 9, 2008
- Recorded: Various (additional remix audio); Godcity Studio in Salem, Massachusetts (original content)
- Genres: Experimental metal, mathcore, electronic
- Label: Relapse

Genghis Tron chronology
Board Up the House Remixes Volume 2 (2008)	Board Up the House Remixes Volume 3 (2008)	Board Up the House Remixes Volume 4 (2008)

Board Up the House Remixes Volume 3 is the third of five in the Board Up the House Remix Series by Genghis Tron. It was released by Relapse Records on December 9, 2008. The first 1000 copies are on transparent red with blue splatter vinyl and, as usual, Relapse has a run of 100 copies on clear for their staff and friends. There is no CD version.

== Track listing ==
No.	Title	Length
1.	"Board Up the House" (Danny Lohner remix)	4:19
2.	"The Feast" (Scott Hull remix)
3.	"City on a Hill/The Whips Blow Back" (Phillip Cope remix)
4.	"I Won't Come Back Alive" (Ulver remix)	5:35
5.	"Relief" (Drumcorps remix)	6:56

Danny Lohner's remix is also featured on the official soundtrack of Screen Gems' 2009 movie, Underworld: Rise of the Lycans under his alias Renholder.
