= Board Up the House Remixes Volume 4 =

EP by Genghis Tron
- Released: December 9, 2008
- Recorded: Various (additional remix audio); Godcity Studio in Salem, Massachusetts (original content)
- Genre: Experimental metal, mathcore, electronic
- Length: 18:41
- Label: Anticon

Genghis Tron chronology
Board Up the House Remixes Volume 3 (2008)	Board Up the House Remixes Volume 4 (2008)	Board Up the House Remixes Volume 5 (2008)

Board Up the House Remixes Volume 4 is the fourth of five in the Board Up the House Remix Series by Genghis Tron. It was released by Anticon on December 9, 2008. The first 1000 copies are on colored vinyl. There is no CD version.

== Track listing ==
No.	Title	Length
1.	"City Whipped" (performed by Subtle)	4:30
2.	"Relief" (Telefon Tel Aviv Dub remix)	5:06
3.	"Endless Endless" (performed by Lucky Dragons)	4:46
4.	"Colony Collapse" (Odd Nosdam remix)	4:19
