= Board Up the House Remixes Volume 5 =

EP by Genghis Tron
- Released: March 14, 2009
- Genres: Ambient, electronic, mathcore
- Length: 28:39
- Label: Crucial Blast Records

Genghis Tron chronology
Board Up the House Remixes Volume 4 (2008)	Board Up the House Remixes Volume 5 (2009)	Dream Weapon (2021)

Professional ratings
Review scores
Source	Rating
AllMusic	1.5/5 stars

Board Up the House Remixes Volume 5 is the final installment of the five-volume remix series that has been produced in co-operation between Genghis Tron and five labels (Relapse, Lovepump United, Anticon, Temporary Residence Ltd. and Crucial Blast). The first 1,000 copies are limited to magenta with mint green splatter.

== Release ==
Release was scheduled for December 2008 or January 2009, but problems with the masters delayed the release date until mid-March 2009.

== Track listing ==
No.	Title	Length
1.	"I Won't Come Back Alive" (Nadja remix)	15:32
2.	"Board Up the House" (Tim Hecker remix)	5:42
3.	"I Won't Come Back Alive" (Dudes You Can Trust remix)	7:25
