= Cape of Hate =

EP by Genghis Tron
- Released: February 26, 2006
- Genres: Cybergrind, electronic
- Length: 18:40
- Label: Crucial Bliss
- Producers: Michael Henderson, Colin Marston

Genghis Tron chronology
Cloak of Love (2005)	Cape of Hate (2006)	Dead Mountain Mouth (2006)

Cape of Hate is the second EP by cybergrind band Genghis Tron. Only 150 copies were made, and they were sold at the band's 2006 spring tour supporting their first EP, Cloak of Love. It contains various remixes and demos of the tracks from Cloak of Love.

== Track listing ==
No.	Title	Length
1.	"Discomfort 1"	0:54
2.	"Rock Candy" (Rainbow Jesus remix)	2:54
3.	"Arms" (Dylan Reece remix)	3:09
4.	"Discomfort 2"	1:39
5.	"Ride the Steambolt" (demo)	1:42
6.	"Welcome Home Mother" (Destructo Swarmbots Rock Candy remix)	5:13
7.	"Laser Bitch" (Exfoliating Gel Scrub remix)	1:28
8.	"Discomfort 3"	1:36
Total length:		18:40
