= Joseph Bertolozzi =

American musician

Joseph Bertolozzi (born 1959) is an American composer and musician with works ranging from full symphony orchestra and solo songs to immense sound-art installations. With increasingly numerous performances across Europe and the United States to his credit, his music is performed by groups ranging from the Grammy-winning Chestnut Brass Company to the Eastman School of Music, and he himself has played at such diverse venues as the Vatican and The US Tennis Open.

== Works and performances ==
His most well known project is Tower Music: a musical composition using only sounds sampled from the surfaces of the Eiffel Tower itself, with no added digital manipulation or alteration of the sounds. The resulting 2016 album "Tower Music" (on the innova label #933), reached #11 on the iTunes Classical charts and #16 on the Billboard Classical Crossover Music chart.

Tower Music is a sister project to Bridge Music. Like Tower Music, Bridge Music allows listeners to hear the sounds of New York's Mid-Hudson Bridge played like a musical instrument. The work was created for New York's 400th anniversary observance of Henry Hudson's voyage up the Hudson River. Originally intended to be a live performance piece, this "audacious plan" (New York Times) to compose music for a suspension bridge using the bridge itself as the instrument brought Bertolozzi wide international attention. A recording of the results, the 2009 CD "Bridge Music" (on the Delos label DE1045), entered the Billboard Classical Crossover Music Chart at #18, and has been released globally. In addition to the album, Bridge Music exists as a free public audio installation on the bridge itself and in nearby parks.

Bertolozzi also has created concert music and theatrical scores, including "The Contemplation of Bravery," which was an official 2002 Bicentennial commission for The United States Military Academy at West Point, and his incidental score to "Waiting for Godot," used at the 1991 Festival Internationale de Café Theatre in Nancy, France. In addition, he has a large body of liturgical music for use in both Christian and Jewish worship.

As a longtime concert organist, he has performed his own compositions as well as those of the classical literature in the US and in Italy (including St. Peter's Basilica), Poland, Spain and Portugal (for the U. S. State Department). He is Organist and Choirmaster at Vassar Temple in Poughkeepsie, NY and St. Joseph's Church in Middletown NY. He also performs and composes for his percussion project "The Bronze Collection," a collection of over 60 gongs and cymbals from around the world.

== Biography ==
Joseph Bertolozzi was born in Poughkeepsie, New York, one year after his parents and sister emigrated from Lucca, Italy. When, at an early age, his interests turned to music, he read biographies of composers, music encyclopedias, and ultimately musical scores from the local library. He began organ lessons not in order to perform, but to learn how to notate the compositions he wished to create.

He went on to receive his A.B. in music from Vassar College, and did further study at the Accademia Musicale Chigiana (with Xenakis and Donatoni), Westminster Choir College, and The Juilliard School, as well as numerous professional workshops with ASCAP, The American Music Center, and Carnegie Hall (including contemporary conducting techniques with Boulez).
