= Board Up the House Remixes Volume 2 =

EP by Genghis Tron
- Released: October 14, 2008
- Recorded: Various (additional remix audio); Godcity Studio in Salem, Massachusetts (original content)
- Genre: Experimental metal, mathcore, electronic
- Length: 20:48
- Label: Lovepump United

Genghis Tron chronology
Board Up the House Remixes Volume 1 (2008)	Board Up the House Remixes Volume 2 (2008)	Board Up the House Remixes Volume 3 (2008)

Professional ratings
Review scores
Source	Rating
AllMusic	Positive

Board Up the House Remixes Volume 2 is the second of five in the Board Up the House Remix Series by Genghis Tron. It was released by Lovepump United on October 14, 2008. However, those ordered directly from the label were shipped out approximately one month before that.

The first 1000 copies are on yellow with red splatter vinyl. There is no CD version.

== Track listing ==
No.	Title	Length
1.	"Relief" (Tobacco remix)	2:33
2.	"Recursion" (Circle remix)	5:54
3.	"Recursion" (CCFC)	7:17
4.	"The Feast/Ergot" (Dntel remix)	4:58
Total length:		20:48
