= Board Up the House =

Studio album by Genghis Tron
- Released: February 19, 2008
- Recorded: Godcity Studio in Salem, Massachusetts
- Genres: Avant-garde metal; grindcore; post-rock; cybergrind; electro industrial
- Length: 43:29
- Labels: Relapse (CD), Lovepump United (vinyl)
- Producers: Kurt Ballou, Genghis Tron

Genghis Tron chronology
| Triple Black Diamond (2007) | Board Up the House (2008) | Board Up the House Remixes Volume 1 (2008) |

Professional ratings
Review scores
| Source | Rating |
|---|---|
| AllMusic | 4.5/5 stars |
| Blogcritics | 3.5/5 stars |
| Consequence of Sound | B |
| IGN | (3.3/10) |
| Lambgoat | (4/10) |
| Metal Hammer | (7/10) |
| MetalSucks | (4.5/5) |
| Pitchfork | (7.0/10) |
| Punknews.org | 4/5 stars |
| Scene Point Blank | (8.2/10) |

Board Up the House is the second full-length album by the experimental metal band Genghis Tron. The album was recorded and mixed at Godcity Studio from August 29 to September 21, 2007, in Salem, Massachusetts, by Converge guitarist Kurt Ballou. It was mastered at New Alliance East by Nick Zampiello. The album was released on February 19, 2008, by Relapse Records on CD and on March 25 by Lovepump United on vinyl.

There are two different vinyl releases from Lovepump United: standard and limited. The standard has two black vinyl discs with the second being single-sided. On the unused side is an etching similar to the album artwork. The limited edition is the same except the first disc is colored with a transparent splatter design, and is limited to 400 copies.

This is the last Genghis Tron album with vocalist Mookie Singerman. This would be the band's last studio album until the release of Dream Weapon in 2021.

== Track listing ==
All tracks are written by Genghis Tron.

| No. | Title | Length |
|---|---|---|
| 1. | "Board Up the House" | 5:54 |
| 2. | "Endless Teeth" | 1:47 |
| 3. | "Things Don't Look Good" | 3:35 |
| 4. | "Recursion" (instrumental) | 2:08 |
| 5. | "I Won't Come Back Alive" | 6:34 |
| 6. | "City on a Hill" | 3:26 |
| 7. | "The Whips Blow Back" (instrumental) | 2:07 |
| 8. | "Colony Collapse" | 4:01 |
| 9. | "The Feast" (featuring Greg Puciato) | 1:56 |
| 10. | "Ergot" (instrumental) | 1:14 |
| 11. | "Relief" | 10:47 |
| Total length: | | 43:29 |

Vinyl Edition Side A
| No. | Title | Length |
|---|---|---|
| 1. | "Board Up the House" | 5:54 |
| 2. | "Endless Teeth" | 1:47 |
| 3. | "Things Don't Look Good" | 3:35 |
| 4. | "Recursion" | 2:08 |
| 5. | "I Won't Come Back Alive" | 6:34 |

Vinyl Edition Side B
| No. | Title | Length |
|---|---|---|
| 1. | "City On a Hill" | 3:26 |
| 2. | "The Whips Blow Back" | 2:07 |
| 3. | "Colony Collapse" | 4:01 |
| 4. | "The Feast" (feat. Greg Puciato) | 1:56 |
| 5. | "Ergot" | 1:14 |

Vinyl Edition Side C
| No. | Title | Length |
|---|---|---|
| 1. | "Relief" | 10:47 |

== Personnel ==
=== Genghis Tron ===
- Mookie Singerman – keyboard, vocals
- Michael Sochynsky – drum programming, keyboard
- Hamilton Jordan – drum programming, guitar

=== Additional musicians ===
- Greg Puciato (The Dillinger Escape Plan) – guest vocals on "The Feast"
- Kurt Ballou – toy drums on "Endless Teeth"

=== Production ===
- Produced by Kurt Ballou and Genghis Tron
- Engineered and mixed by Kurt Ballou
- Mastered by Nick Zampiello
