= Tower Music (Joseph Bertolozzi) =

2016 musical project by Joseph Bertolozzi

Tower Music (also known as Musique de la Tour), is a musical project and album (2016) by composer and musician Joseph Bertolozzi. The project used microphones placed on the surfaces of the Eiffel Tower to capture the sounds of the tower. The resulting samples were used to create a musical composition using only the sounds of the tower itself, with no added digital manipulation or alteration of the sounds.

The 2016 album Tower Music (on the innova label #933), reached #11 on the iTunes Classical charts and #16 on the Billboard Classical Crossover Music chart.

The precursor to the Tower Music project was Bridge Music. Not thinking he could gain access to the Eiffel Tower, Bertolozzi went about creating a composition made using only the unmodified sounds of New York's Mid-Hudson Bridge, for the Hudson-Fulton-Champlain Quadricentennial celebrations in 2009. Bertolozzi used Bridge Music as a proof of concept to present to SETE, the authority that controls the Eiffel Tower. By 2010, plans were underway to attempt field recording and a live performance on the Eiffel Tower.

After a formal meeting with SETE in November 2010, the project was approved in March 2011. In January 2013, Bertolozzi met with Eiffel Tower officials and reviewed what areas would be appropriate to record audio samples. Field recording of samples took place May 27 through June 7, 2013. Bertolozzi next reviewed, cataloged and edited each sample. The process of writing the final composition began in February 2014 and went until October 2014. After finalizing a computerized version of the musical composition, work began on a recorded album of Tower Music. Preliminary mixing beginning in April 2015, with Paul Kozel at the Sonic Arts Center at the City College of New York. The album was released on April 29, 2016, on the innova label.
