= Board Up the House Remixes Volume 1 =

EP by Genghis Tron
- Released: September 23, 2008
- Genres: Ambient, electronic, mathcore
- Length: 26:03
- Label: Temporary Residence Limited

Genghis Tron chronology
Board Up the House (2008)	Board Up the House Remixes Volume 1 (2008)	Board Up the House Remixes Volume 2 (2008)

Board Up the House Remixes Volume 1 is the first album in the Board Up the House Remixes series. It was released by Temporary Residence Limited on September 23, 2008. However, those ordered directly from the label were shipped out approximately one month earlier.

Packaged in a jacket featuring "remixed" album art by Jon Beasley, this release was limited to 1,000 copies on silver/orange splatter vinyl. There is no CD version.

== Track listing ==
No.	Title	Length
1.	"Board Up the House" (Steve Moore remix)	5:18
2.	"Colony Collapse" (Justin K. Broadrick remix)	7:33
3.	"Things Don't Look Good" (Rob Crow remix)	3:41
4.	"Ergot" (Eluvium remix)	9:31
Total length:		26:03
