= Genghis Tron =

American experimental metal band

- Origin: Pittsburgh, Pennsylvania
- Genres: Experimental metal; cybergrind; mathcore; electronic
- Years active: 2004–2010; 2020–present
- Labels: Relapse, Crucial Blast, Lovepump United
- Members: Hamilton Jordan; Michael Sochynsky; Nick Yacyshyn; Tony Wolski; Kenny Szymanski
- Past members: Mookie Singerman

Genghis Tron is an American experimental metal band that was founded in Poughkeepsie, New York in 2004. The band subsequently relocated to Pittsburgh, Pennsylvania, where it was based for much of its first several years. Its members currently reside in Brooklyn, New York, and San Francisco, California. The band signed to Relapse Records after releasing two recordings on Crucial Blast. The group went on an indefinite hiatus in 2010, but returned in 2020 and soon after announced a new album, Dream Weapon, which was released in March 2021.

== History ==
=== 2004–2010: Formation, Dead Mountain Mouth, and Board Up the House ===
Genghis Tron formed in 2004 in Poughkeepsie, New York. Around the time of the band's formation, vocalist Mookie Singerman sang and played guitar in the two-piece project Glitter Pals with his friend Jake Friedman while they were attending Vassar College. Friedman also featured on the song "Laser Bitch" from Genghis Tron's Cloak of Love EP (2005).

Genghis Tron has toured with such bands as Behold... the Arctopus, Converge, Kylesa, Gaza, The Dillinger Escape Plan and The Faint.

In 2008, the group released an album, Board Up the House. It was named a "Critic's Choice" by The New York Times and was awarded the title of "Album of the Year" by the magazine Rock Sound.

=== 2010–2020: Indefinite hiatus ===
In late 2010, the band members decided to take a break away from Genghis Tron, but assured fans in a Myspace message that they would return with new material when they started playing together again. The band was inactive for a decade and did not release or reissue any material during this time.

=== 2020–present: Return and Dream Weapon ===
On August 10, 2020, Genghis Tron announced that they had returned from their hiatus and began work on the first new, original material in 13 years. This return also saw the addition of drummer Nick Yacyshyn, who is the band's first drummer due to the band using a drum machine for previous releases. Founder and vocalist Mookie Singerman did not rejoin the band and was replaced by Tony Wolski.

In January 2021, the band announced their third album, Dream Weapon, would be released on March 26. The album was produced by Kurt Ballou and notably features a shift from the group's previously heavy sound, leaning towards a "more meditative, hypnotic, and maybe psychedelic" direction. The record is completely devoid of blast beats and screamed vocals.

The group's fourth album, Signal Fire, was released on June 12, 2026 through Relapse.

== Musical style ==
The band was initially characterized by its hybridization of grindcore, mathcore and electronic music, later incorporating elements of various metal and rock genres, including post-metal, doom metal, and shoegaze. Genghis Tron was initially associated with cybergrind, but subsequently developed a more varied sound incorporating elements of IDM, doom and ambient. Following their reformation, the band moved away from the cybergrind style of their earlier material and can, in modernity, be described as more of an experimental metal band.

Genghis Tron uses computer-based sequencers, including FL Studio and Ableton Live, alongside synthesizers manufactured by Moog, Alesis, and Novation. The band originally performed as a three-piece without a drummer or dedicated bass guitarist. Following their return, the lineup was expanded to four members and incorporated a human drummer. Although the band did not initially have a dedicated bassist, its members have stated that bass guitar was used occasionally on their albums, as noted in the liner notes of Dead Mountain Mouth.

== Members ==
Current members

- Michael Sochynsky – keyboards, programming (2004–2010, 2020–present)
- Hamilton Jordan – guitar, programming (2004–2010, 2020–present)
- Tony Wolski – vocals (2020–present)
- Nick Yacyshyn – drums (2020–present)
- Kenny Szymanski – bass guitar, keyboards (2026–present)

Former members

- Mookie Singerman – vocals, keyboards (2004–2010)

Timeline

== Discography ==
Studio albums

- Dead Mountain Mouth (2006, Crucial Blast / Lovepump United)
- Board Up the House (2008, Relapse / Lovepump United)
- Dream Weapon (2021, Relapse)
- Signal Fire (2026, Relapse)

Extended plays

- Cloak of Love (2005, Crucial Blast / Lovepump United)
- Cape of Hate (2006, Crucial Bliss)
- Triple Black Diamond (2007, Crucial Bliss)

Remix series

- Board Up the House Remixes Volume 1 (2008, Temporary Residence Limited)
- Board Up the House Remixes Volume 2 (2008, Lovepump United)
- Board Up the House Remixes Volume 3 (2008, Relapse)
- Board Up the House Remixes Volume 4 (2008, Anticon)
- Board Up the House Remixes Volume 5 (2009, Crucial Blast)

Demo

- Laser Bitch (2004, self-released)

Singles

- "Dream Weapon" (2021, Relapse)
- "Ritual Circle" (2021, Relapse)
- "Pyrocene" (2021, Relapse)

Music videos

Year	Song	Album	Director
2008	"Things Don't Look Good"	Board Up the House	Sean O'Connor
2009	"Endless Teeth"	Board Up the House	Sean O'Connor
2021	"Dream Weapon"	Dream Weapon	Mount Emult
2021	"Pyrocene"	Dream Weapon	Yoshi Sodeoka
