= Dream Weapon =

Studio album by Genghis Tron
- Released: March 26, 2021
- Studios: Godcity Studios, Salem, Massachusetts
- Genres: Post-rock; progressive metal
- Length: 45:31
- Label: Relapse
- Producer: Kurt Ballou

Genghis Tron chronology
| Board Up the House Remixes Volume 5 (2009) | Dream Weapon (2021) | Signal Fire (2026) |

Singles from Dream Weapon
- 1. "Dream Weapon" Released: January 26, 2021; 2. "Ritual Circle" Released: February 16, 2021; 3. "Pyrocene" Released: March 16, 2021

Professional ratings
Review scores
| Source | Rating |
|---|---|
| Kerrang! | 4/5 |
| Metal Injection | 8/10 |
| Metal Sucks | 4.5/5 stars |

Dream Weapon is the third studio album by American experimental metal band Genghis Tron, released on March 26, 2021. The album is the band's first studio album since 2008's Board Up the House and the first with vocalist Tony Wolski and drummer Nick Yacyshyn, marking the first time the band has ever used a drummer.

Keyboardist Michael Sochynsky described the album's sound as having a "more meditative, hypnotic, and maybe psychedelic" direction. He also added that the album would have no blast beats or "Nintendocore" parts. Metal Injection wrote that Yacyshyn adds a shimmering shoegaze style to the band by emphasizing the many cymbals of his drum kit.

It was elected by PopMatters as the 2nd best progressive metal album of 2021.

== Background ==
Genghis Tron's last album, Board Up the House, was released in 2008 to critical acclaim. The band released a series of remix EPs for the album in 2008 and 2009. In late 2010 on MySpace, the band members announced that they would be going on hiatus, but would return with new music once they started playing together again. Nearly after ten years of silence, the band announced they were returning from hiatus and would be recording a new album with Converge guitarist Kurt Ballou, who also produced the band's previous two albums. The reunited lineup features original members Hamilton Jordan (guitar) and Michael Sochynsky (keyboards, programming) along with new members Tony Wolski on vocals, replacing Mookie Singerman, and Nick Yacyshyn on drums, with the band having previously used a drum machine on previous releases.

A music video was released for the title track and lead single "Dream Weapon" on January 26, 2021. The video was directed by Mount Emult. "Ritual Circle" was released as the album's second single on February 16. Axl Rosenberg of MetalSucks favorably compared the track to Tangerine Dream, Chvrches and Justin Broadrick. The final single, "Pyrocene", was released on March 16.

== Track listing ==
All tracks are written by Genghis Tron.

Dream Weapon track listing
| No. | Title | Length |
|---|---|---|
| 1. | "Exit Perfect Mind" | 1:11 |
| 2. | "Pyrocene" | 6:13 |
| 3. | "Dream Weapon" | 5:13 |
| 4. | "Desert Stairs" | 2:05 |
| 5. | "Alone in the Heart of the Light" | 7:07 |
| 6. | "Ritual Circle" | 10:21 |
| 7. | "Single Black Point" | 4:23 |
| 8. | "Great Mother" | 8:58 |
| Total length: | | 45:31 |

== Personnel ==
Genghis Tron

- Tony Wolski – vocals
- Hamilton Jordan – guitar
- Michael Sochynsky – keyboards, programming
- Nick Yacyshyn – drums

Production

- Kurt Ballou – producer
- Ben Chisholm – engineering and additional production
- J.J. Heath – engineering and additional production
- Heba Kadry – mastering
