= Triple Black Diamond =

EP by Genghis Tron
- Released: July 2007
- Genres: Cybergrind, experimental metal
- Length: 34:05
- Label: Crucial Blast

Genghis Tron chronology
Dead Mountain Mouth (2006)	Triple Black Diamond (2007)	Board Up the House (2008)

Triple Black Diamond is a limited-edition EP by Genghis Tron. The album was available at shows during their July 2007 tour and was limited to 444 copies. On August 12, 2007, a small number of additional copies were available from the Crucial Blast website.

The "Untitled Demo (Spring '07)" was later named "Colony Collapse".

== Track listing ==
No.	Title	Length
1.	"Ride the Steambolt" (live)	2:40
2.	"Chapels" (live)	1:55
3.	"The Folding Road" (live)	3:08
4.	"Rick Allen Mix by Vytear"	4:19
5.	"The Folding Road" (Carwash Climax remix)	5:29
6.	"Greek Beds" (1993 Industrial Dance version)	2:22
7.	"Dead Mountain Mouth (Epeirogenesis)"	10:19
8.	"Untitled Demo (Spring '07)"	3:53
Total length:		34:05
