= Bridge Music =

Sound art installation

Sign at the Listening Stations describing the music tracks and how they were developed.

Bridge Music is a public sound art installation on the Mid-Hudson Bridge in New York. An album was released featuring music from the installation, under the same name.

== History ==
One of composer Joseph Bertolozzi's most well known undertakings, the Bridge Music project uses only the sounds of New York's Mid-Hudson Bridge to play the bridge like a musical instrument. The work was completed in time for New York's 400th anniversary observance of Henry Hudson's voyage up the river that now bears his name, but was underway as early as 2004. Originally intended to be a live performance piece (circa 2006), this "audacious plan" (New York Times) to compose music for a suspension bridge using the bridge itself as the instrument brought Bertolozzi wide local and international attention. When funding fell through for a live performance, Bertolozzi took the audio samples he had used to compose his works for the bridge, and used them to put together a studio album. The installation features audio from the album, and allows listeners to hear the project on the bridge itself. In 2016, a documentary film by Andrew Porter captured "Bridge Music" and its back-story.

Bertolozzi later began working on creating a similar project to have a group of live percussionists play the Eiffel Tower. That project changed into what is now Tower Music.

== Installation ==
Bridge Music exists as a free public audio installation on the bridge itself and in nearby parks. The Bridge Music Listening Stations are located on the pedestrian sidewalk of the Mid Hudson Bridge, at each of the bridge's towers. They are open dawn to dusk from April 1 through October 31. Additionally, Park Radios on 95.3FM play the same music year-round, 24/7 in Waryas Park, Poughkeepsie and Johnson-Iorio Park, Highland.

Bridge Music

Studio album by Joseph Bertolozzi
- Released: May 2009
- Recorded: 2008
- Genres: Contemporary classical music, Art music, Experimental music, Electronic art music, 21st-century classical music, Electronic body music
- Length: 48:19
- Label: Delos
- Producer: Joseph Bertolozzi

Joseph Bertolozzi chronology
| The Bronze Collection | Bridge Music |

== Album ==
Released in 2009, the CD Bridge Music (on the Delos label DE1045) entered the Billboard Classical Crossover Music Chart at #18, and has been released globally. Justin Patrick, writing for music site Brainwashed, called the Bridge Music CD "a fun album. It takes a high art concept and makes it playful."
