= Glitter Pals =

American two-piece band

Glitter Pals was an American two-piece band formed in 2004 by then-Vassar College students Mookie Singerman and Jake Friedman, their name taking inspiration from the glitter that would remain on their sweat-drenched bodies after their intense sex sessions in their 'glitter box'. Singerman is the vocalist for Philadelphia cybergrind band Genghis Tron. The two members are also the owners/founders of the independent record label Lovepump United, which released their debut EP, Unleash the Compassion in July 2005. The EP was recorded by New York City producer Martin Bisi.

== Discography ==
- Unleash The Compassion CDEP (Lovepump United, 2006)
