= Mid-Hudson Bridge =

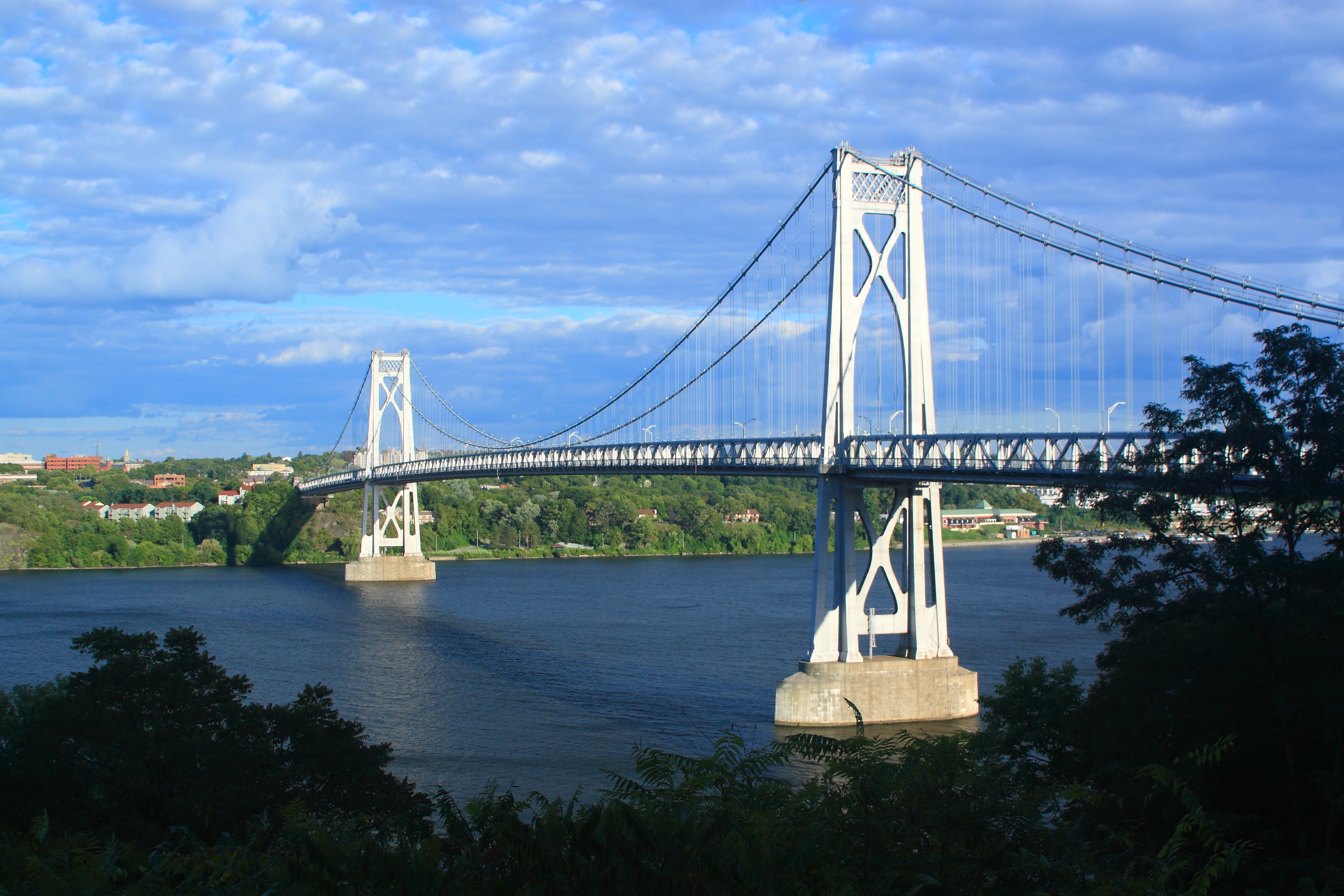
- Coordinates: 41°42′11″N 73°56′46″W
- Carries: 3 lanes of US 44 / NY 55
- Crosses: Hudson River
- Locale: Highland, New York and Poughkeepsie, New York
- Official name: Franklin Delano Roosevelt Mid-Hudson Bridge
- Maintained by: New York State Bridge Authority

Characteristics
- Design: Suspension bridge
- Total length: 3,000 feet (910 m)
- Longest span: 457.3 metres (1,500 ft)
- Clearance below: 135 feet (41 m)

History
- Opened: August 25, 1930; 95 years ago

Statistics
- Toll: (eastbound only) passenger cars $2.15 cash, $1.65 E-ZPass

Location
- Interactive map of Mid-Hudson Bridge

The Franklin Delano Roosevelt Mid-Hudson Bridge is a toll suspension bridge which carries US 44 and NY 55 across the Hudson River between Poughkeepsie and Highland in the state of New York.

== History ==
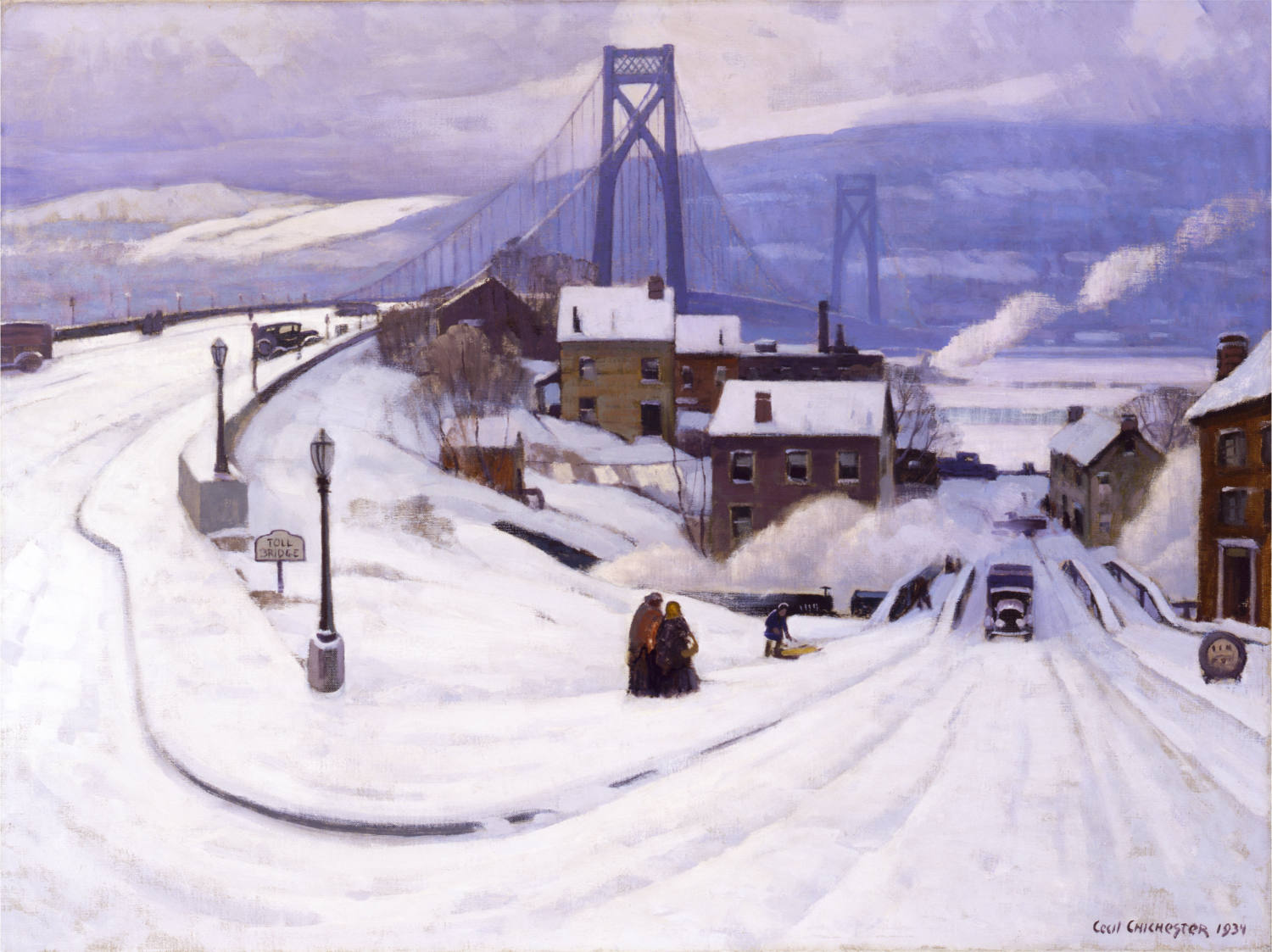
1934 painting of the bridge

Proposals for the Mid-Hudson span were made by state legislature in 1923. Although the Bear Mountain Bridge in Rockland County, New York and the Holland Tunnel in Manhattan were under construction, there were then no fixed highway crossings south of Albany. Then-Governor of New York Alfred E. Smith signed the bill in June 1923. Construction would be undertaken by the New York State Department of Public Works (now the New York State Department of Transportation).

Construction began in 1925. Caissons weighing 66,000 tons were sunk into the riverbed; dirt was removed by crews working in a pressurized environment. The 315-foot-tall (96 m) Gothic steel towers were constructed in April 1929. Three years after opening, ownership was transferred to the New York State Bridge Authority in 1933, shortly after the Authority was created.

Then-Governor Franklin D. Roosevelt and his wife Eleanor attended the opening ceremony on August 25, 1930.

The toll plaza was originally located on the eastern side of the bridge, but was moved to the western side in Ulster County when a new highway approach was opened on December 20, 1967. Originally, tolls were collected in both directions. In August 1970, the toll was abolished for westbound drivers, and at the same time, eastbound drivers saw their tolls doubled. The tolls of eleven other New York–New Jersey and Hudson River crossings along a 130-mile (210 km) stretch, from the Outerbridge Crossing in the south to the Rip Van Winkle Bridge in the north, were also changed to eastbound-only at that time.

The Mid-Hudson Bridge was designated as a New York State Historic Civil Engineering Landmark by the American Society of Civil Engineers in 1983. The bridge was renamed the "Franklin Delano Roosevelt Mid-Hudson Bridge" in 1994.

In 2009, composer Joseph Bertolozzi completed Bridge Music, a project which allows listeners to hear the Mid-Hudson bridge played like a musical instrument. The work was created for New York's 400th anniversary observance of Henry Hudson's voyage up the Hudson. Originally intended to be a live performance piece, this "audacious plan" to compose music for a suspension bridge using the bridge itself as the instrument brought Bertolozzi wide international attention. A recording of the results, the 2009 CD "Bridge Music" (on the Delos label DE1045), entered the Billboard Classical Crossover Music Chart at #18, and has been released globally.

At midnight on March 1, 2022, the bridge was converted to all-electronic tolling in the eastbound direction.

== Description ==
The bridge is 3,000 feet (910 m) long with a clearance of 135 feet (41 m) above the Hudson. At opening, it was the sixth-longest suspension bridge in the world. The chief engineer was Polish immigrant Ralph Modjeski, who had previously engineered the strengthening of the nearby Poughkeepsie Railroad bridge. Primary contractor was the American Bridge Company of Ambridge, Pennsylvania with steel from Carnegie. The span contains stiffening trusses intentionally constructed on top of the deck instead of below the deck.

The bridge carries three lanes of US 44 and NY 55 and a pedestrian/bicycle walkway over the Hudson. The bridge allows connections to US 9 on the east side, and US 9W to the west. The center lane is generally closed, except for rush hour traffic eastbound from 6 am to 9 am, and westbound from 3 pm to 6 pm. The center lane is also occasionally opened when work is being done on either side of the bridge. Five lane signals (referred to as "gantries" by NYSBA) indicate which lanes are open for travel. Approaches on either side of the bridge are four lanes, causing a bottleneck going onto the one- or two-lane span. The bridge has a computer-controlled LED decorative lighting system attached to the suspension cables, allowing the bridge to be decorated for Christmas (red, green) or the Fourth of July (red, white, and blue), and for other holidays.

In 2019, the bridge authority announced that tolls on its Hudson River crossings would increase each year beginning in 2020 and ending in 2023. As of May 1, 2021 the toll for passenger cars traveling eastbound on the Mid-Hudson Bridge was $1.75 in cash, $1.45 for E-ZPass users. In May 2022 tolls rose to $1.55 for E-ZPass users and $2 for cash payers. In 2023, the E-ZPass toll increased to $1.65, and the cash toll rose to $2.15

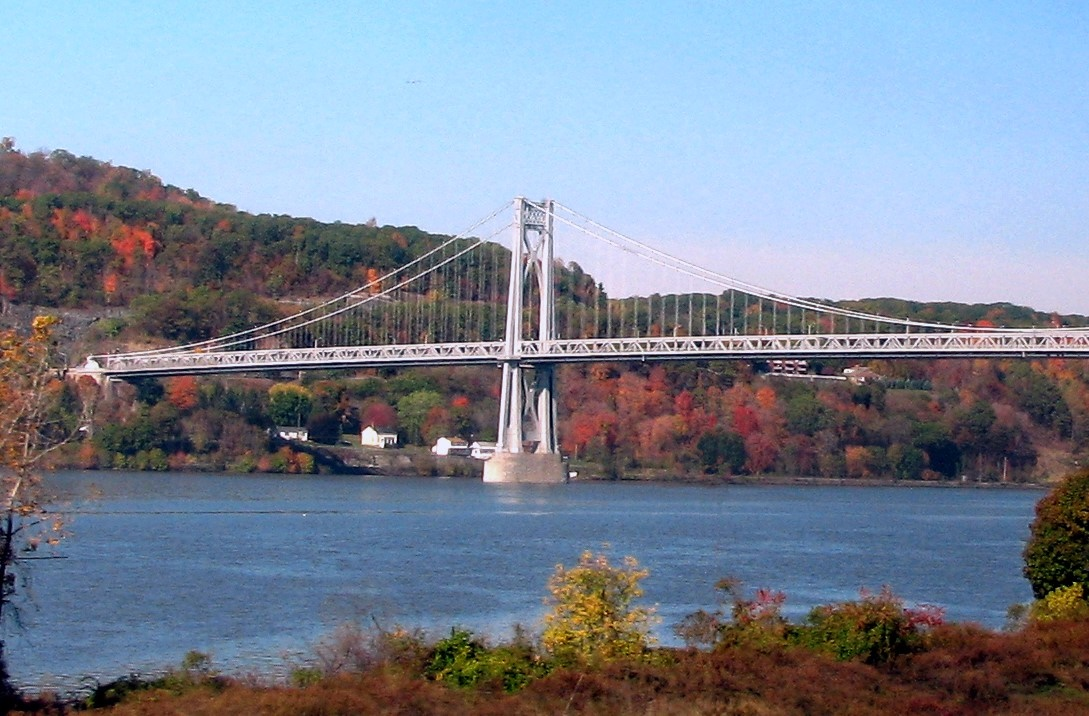
The bridge from the south-east

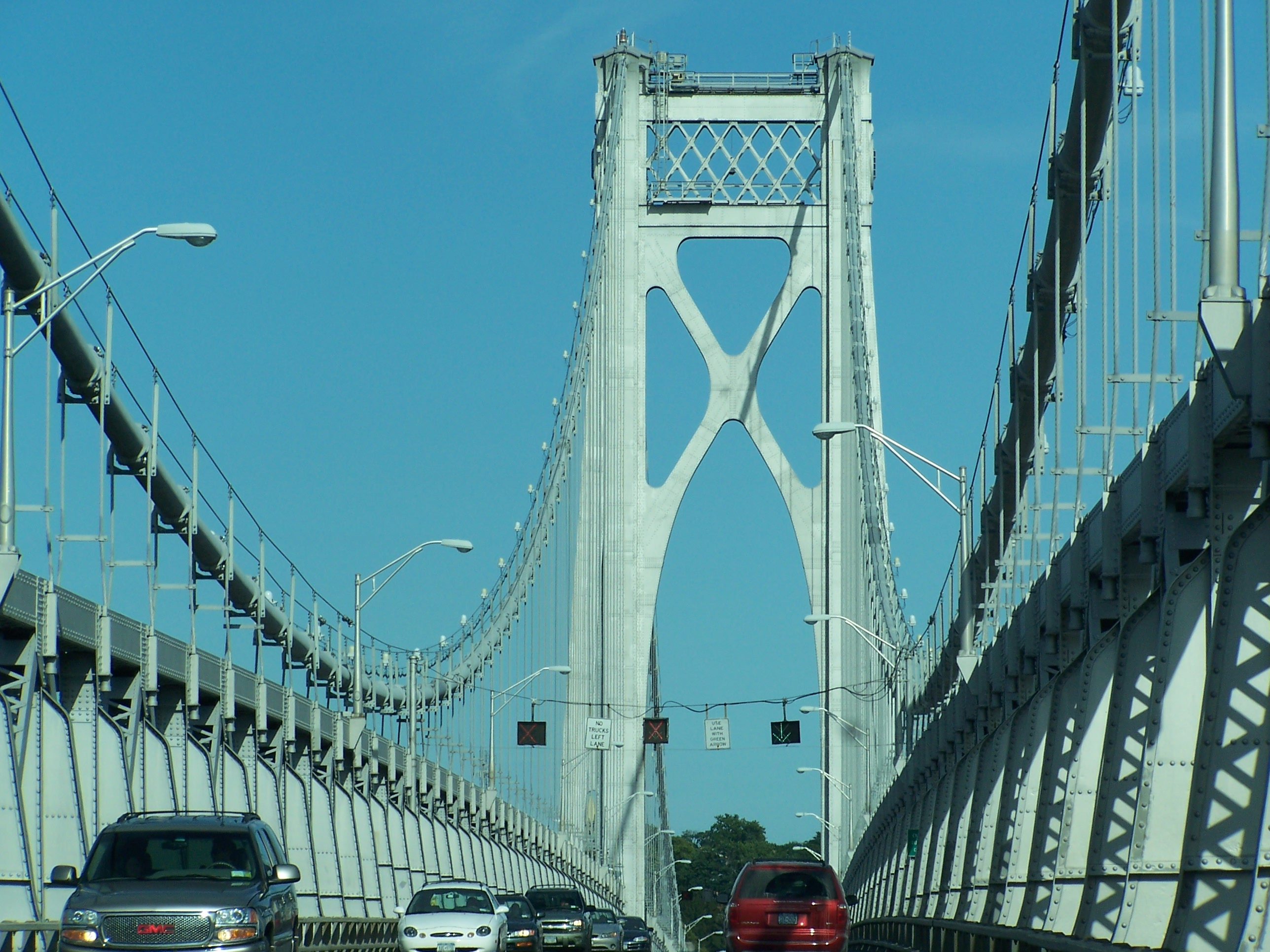
Looking east on the Mid-Hudson Bridge

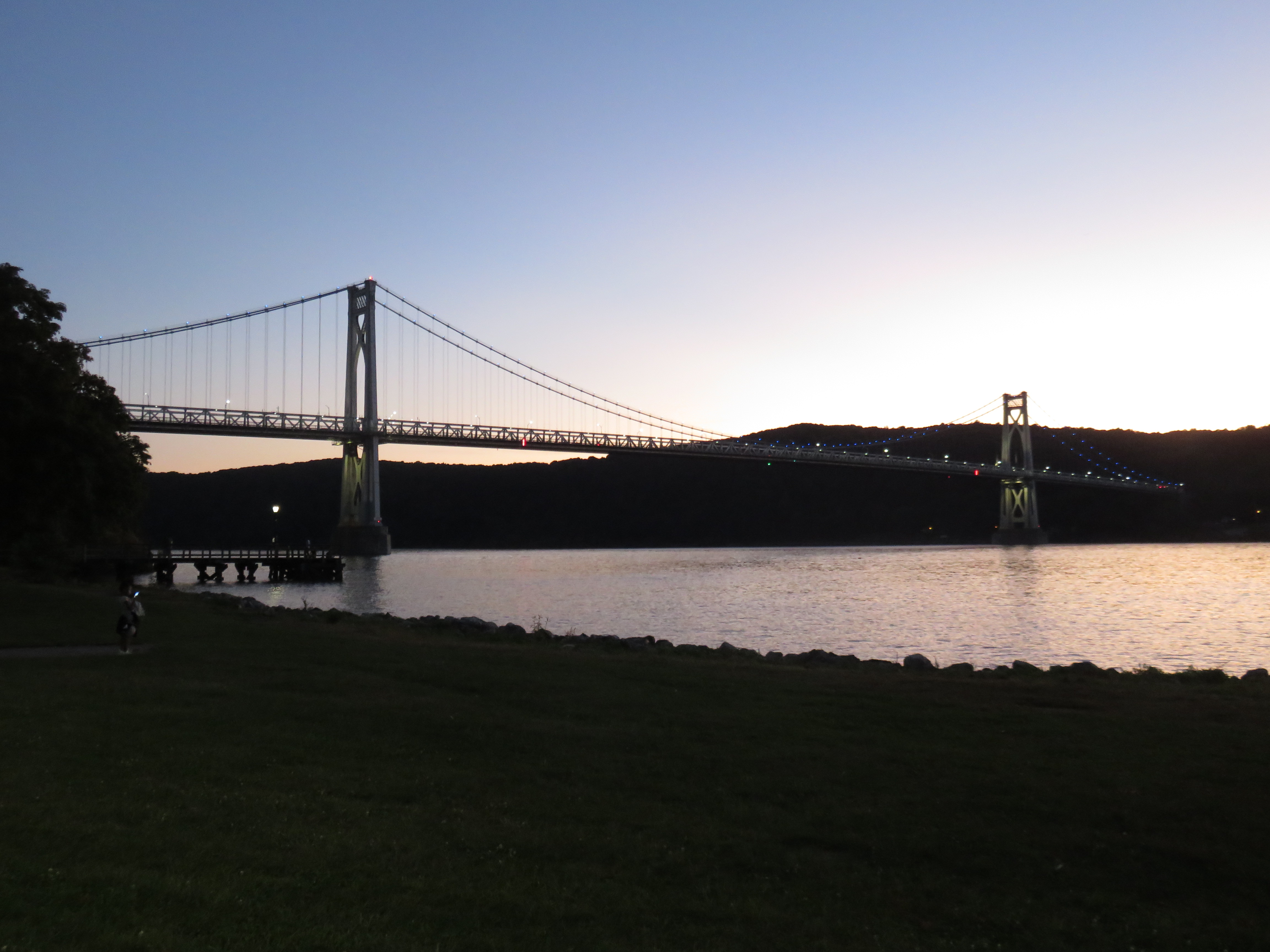
The bridge in twilight in 2019

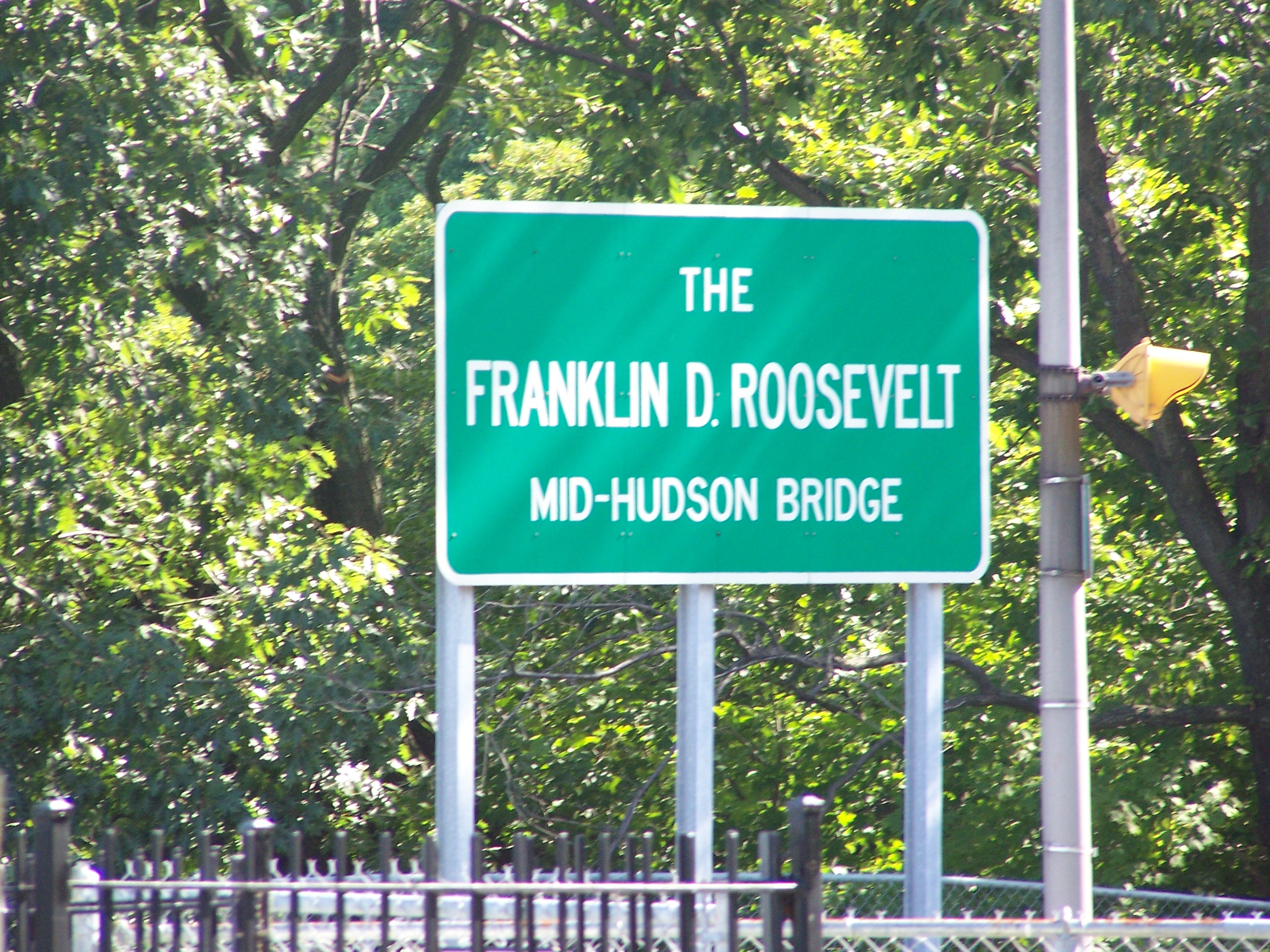
Sign bearing the official name of the span

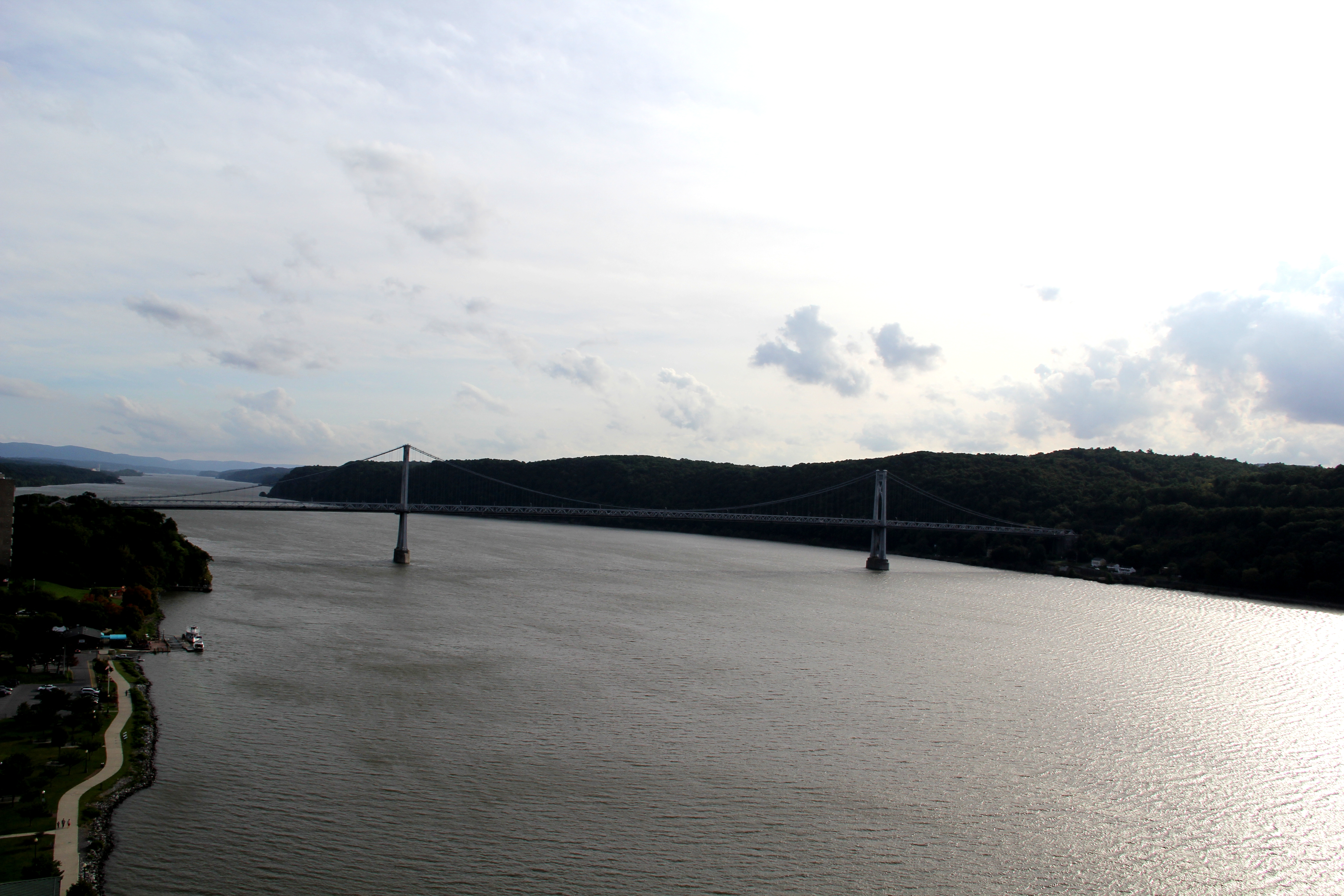
The from the north, as seen from the Walkway Over the Hudson

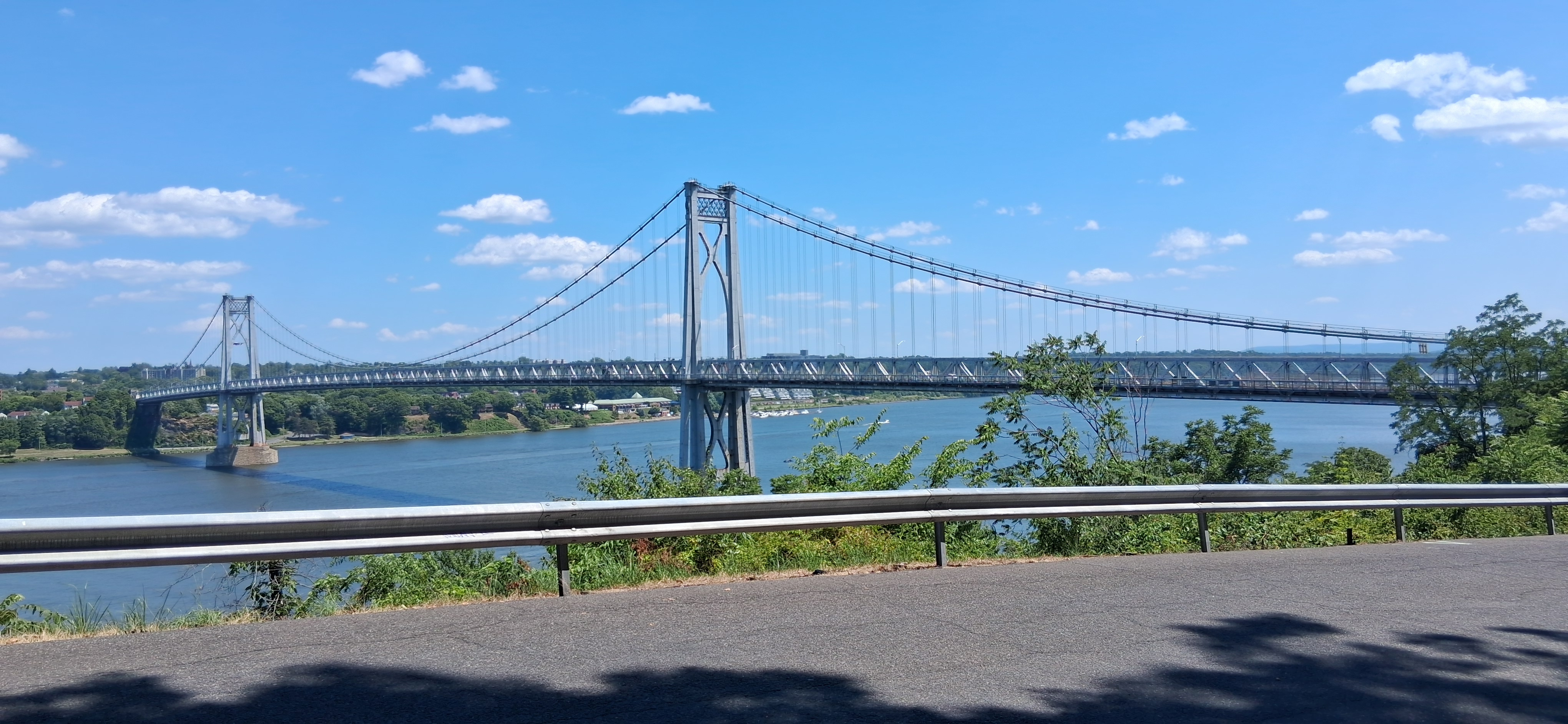
Mid-Hudson Bridge seen from northwest

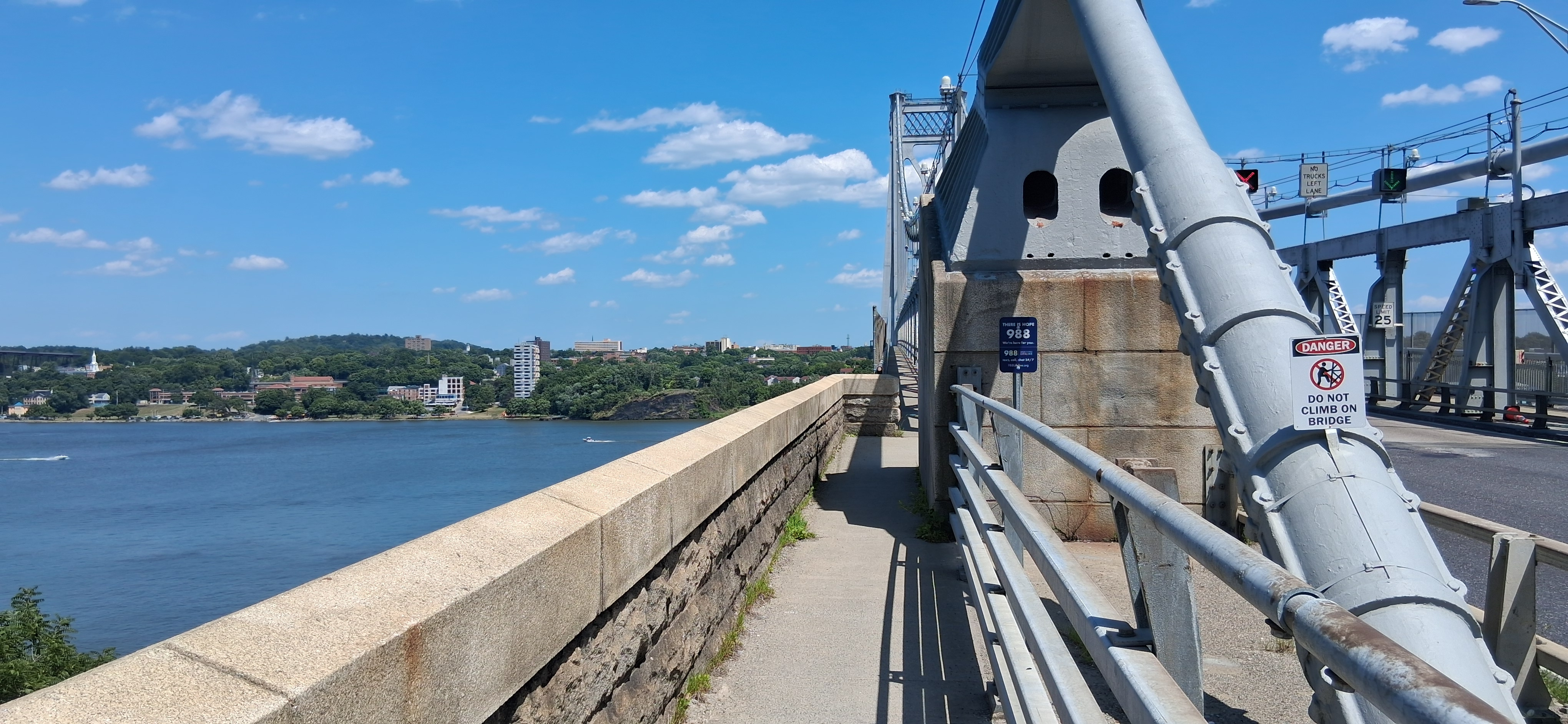
Mid-Hudson Bridge looking east

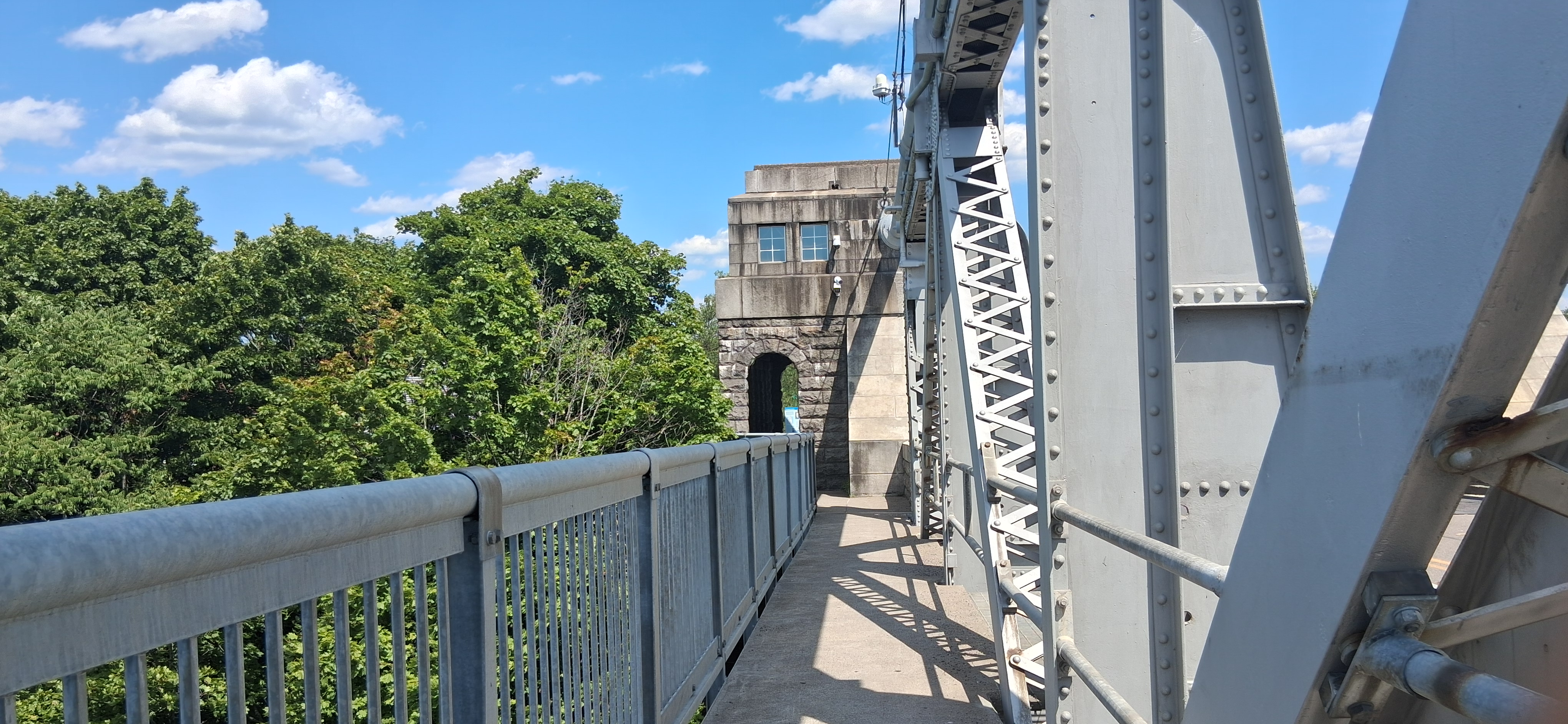
Mid-Hudson Bridge eastside structure

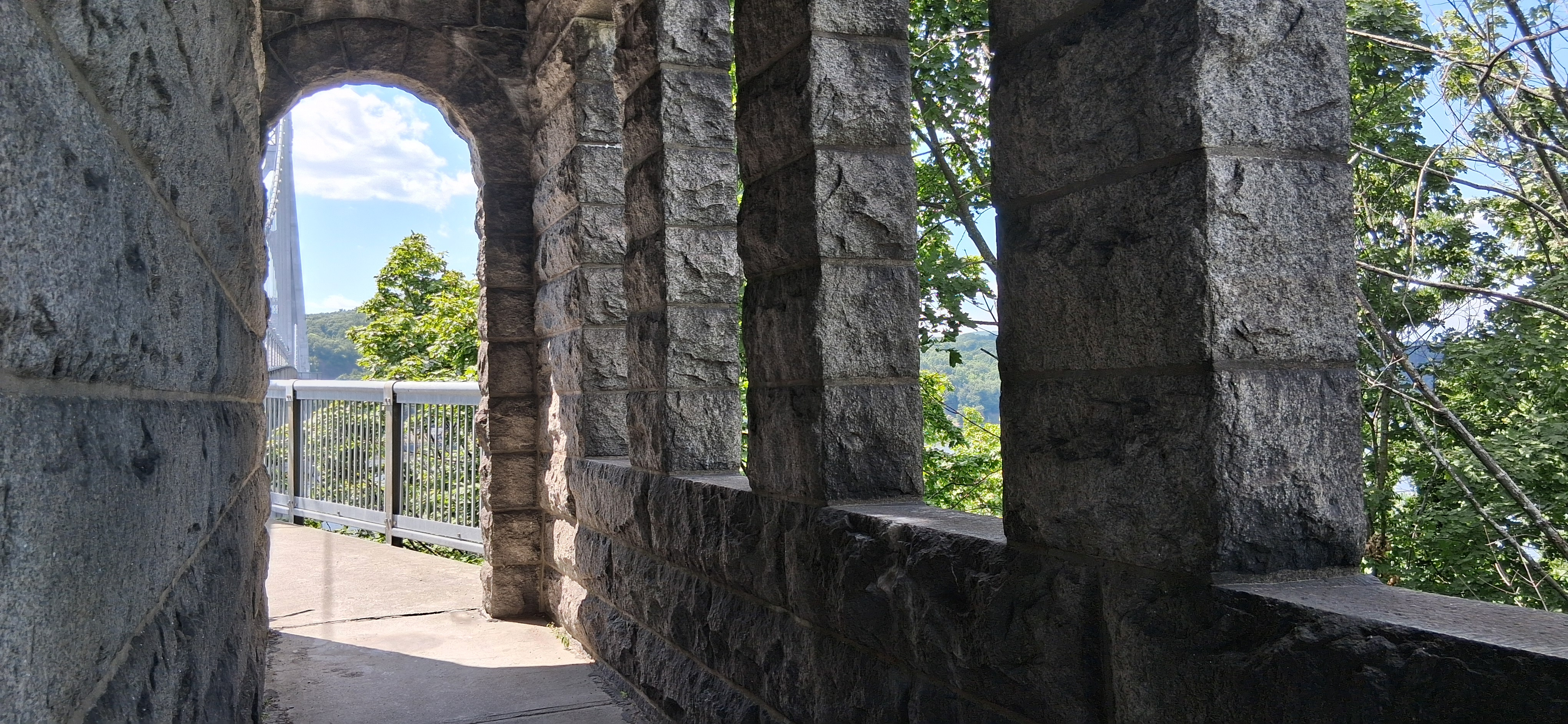
Mid-Hudson Bridge looking west

== See also ==
- List of fixed crossings of the Hudson River
- List of bridges documented by the Historic American Engineering Record in New York
