= Committee Entertainment =

US EDM event production group

- Company type: Private company
- Industry: Concert tours, event production, party promotion
- Founded: 2006
- Headquarters: Florida, United States
- Key people: Sebastian Solano, Paul Campbell, Lukasz Tracz, Patryk Tracz
- Owner: SFX Entertainment
- Parent: Life in Color
- Website: lifeincolor.com

The Committee is an EDM event production group founded in 2006 as Committee Entertainment by Sebastian Solano, Paul Campbell, Lukasz Tracz, and Patryk Tracz. At the time all four founders were friends and college students in Florida, and they originally started the Committee as an informal party promotion team. Since then, Committee Entertainment has founded the Dayglow tour series and Life in Color, an international EDM concert company. After jointly selling Dayglow/Life in Color to SFX Entertainment in 2012, all four members remained partners, and as of 2015 they continue to operate both Life in Color and Committee Entertainment. On January 5, 2015, Forbes included Life in Color CEO Solano on their annual list of "30 Under 30 In Music" for 2015.

== Founder backgrounds ==
=== Sebastian Solano ===
Sebastian Solano is a Colombian-American business executive best known as co-founder, CEO, and President of Life in Color. When The Committee was formed, Solano was in charge of event negotiations, later becoming President. After the acquisition by SFX, Solano stayed on as CEO and President. As President and CEO of Dayglow, he oversaw the company's international expansion, as well as Dayglow's buyout by SFX Entertainment in 2012. The merger led to Dayglow changing into Life in Color, with Solano remaining President and CEO of both Committee Entertainment and Life in Color. Solano has been interviewed in media outlets such as Pollstar, and in January 2015, Forbes named him one of their "30 Under 30 In Music" for 2015. In November 2015, Solano was appointed the new of ID&T North America / Made Event by SFX Entertainment.

=== Lukasz Tracz ===
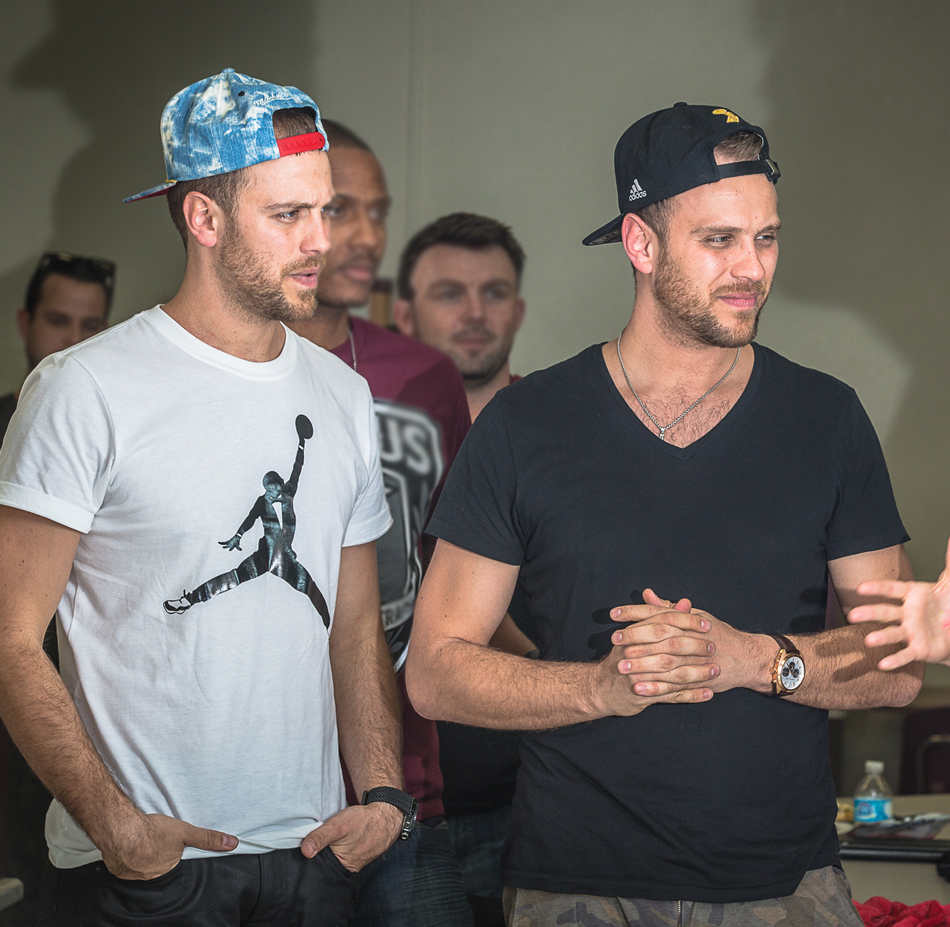
Lukasz Tracz and his twin brother Patryk Tracz directing their new Life In Color Unleash Tour commercial in Miami Florida, January 2014

Lukasz Tracz (born April 4, 1985) is an entrepreneur and a businessman who currently lives in Miami Beach, Florida. Involved with several ventures, he is best known as the co-founder of Life in Color. In 2013, Lukasz and his business partners hosted their 1st Life in Color Festival in Miami. Committed to blending genres, the committee faced criticism when they added 2 Chainz to the event, with Lukasz defending the inclusion of hip hop. 2 Chainz was eventually added to the lineup.

=== Paul Campbell ===
Paul Campbell is an American entrepreneur and businessman best known as an owner and managing partner of Life in Color, as well as a co-founder and co-organizer of the Life in Color Festival. Campbell was born and raised in the United States, and after high school he began attending Florida State University (FSU). When he co-founded Committee Entertainment in 2006, Campbell was living at an apartment on the FSU campus. As the franchise grew, Campbell dropped out of FSU during his final semester to focus on Dayglow.

In 2010 DayGlow continued to tour, with Campbell and the other founders driving around the country to put on events. After the acquisition by SFX, Campbell remained a partner at Dayglow, and since then had been involved with various projects, including co-producing the halftime show for the Guinness International Champions Cup Final. As of 2014 Campbell lives in Fort Lauderdale, Florida.

=== Patryk Tracz ===
Patryk Tracz (born April 4, 1985) is a Polish-American executive, best known as the President of Life in Color. Born in Ziębice, Poland to Krystyna Janowski and Dariusz Tracz, when Tracz was nine years old he moved with his family from Poland to Boca Raton, Florida in search of financial stability. In Florida, Tracz and his twin brother Lukasz Tracz attended Spanish River High School. Starting in 2004, Tracz began studying marketing and business at Florida Atlantic University (FAU). While still attending FAU, by 2006 Tracz was living with his brother and several housemates at an apartment on the Florida State University campus. When he co-founded Committee Entertainment, Tracz began handling Operations and Production.

In January 2008 he began working at marketing at the company MDVIP, where he worked until April 2009. He also continued to work with DayGlow, and earned his degree from Florida Atlantic University in 2010, having extended his education to focus on the company. After the acquisition by SFX and renaming into Life in Color, Tracz remained Vice President. As of 2014 Tracz was based in West Palm Beach, Florida.

== History ==
=== 2006: Party promotion ===
Life in Color was founded as Dayglow by four students living in Florida in 2006. Sebastian Solano, Paul Campbell, Lukasz Tracz and Patryk Tracz all were housemates at an apartment on the Florida State University (FSU) campus. That year all four began throwing themed "super extravagant house parties" on a monthly basis, bringing in DJ Climax for the music. Reinvesting the monthly profits, often at a loss, eventually they began renting "half a nightclub" at a time with bottle and limousine service, then bringing the party back to their house afterwards. As the parties grew in size and popularity, the four founders named themselves Committee Entertainment, planning events as partners. All founders were avid fans of house music, and took different roles. Clubs soon began paying the small company to bring their parties, and according to Solano, they were some of the few local promoters at the time to focus on EDM.

=== 2007: Dayglow tour series ===
Soon a friend introduced Solano to an informal party series called Dayglow, "a fraternity and sorority tradition at FSU" that involved hundreds of college students in white shirts throwing non-toxic paint on one-another. Solano, who was a fan of the Sensation events in Europe, was inspired by the idea of a traveling Dayglow tour. He and Committee Entertainment registered trademarks for Dayglow, and in 2007 their first Dayglow event was held in a Miami nightclub called Allure, with close to 600 attendees. The company then contacted other Florida cities such as Orlando, Tampa, and Gainesville, and began pitching the Dayglow parties. Eventually they decided to rent out the UCF Arena, though Solano stated that at the time, they "had no idea how to do a real concert." All four founders dropped out of college to pursue the venture.

As the tour increased in popularity, the shows grew more extravagant in nature: booking larger acts and increasing the magnitude of its artistic elements. When the Dayglow tour started traveling to cities outside of Florida, the founders custom-built paint cannons and guns, also hiring someone from Cirque du Soleil to run their performance department. In 2009 and 2010, a Dayglow stage was held at Ultra Music Festival. After moving their headquarters to Miami, also in 2010 DayGlow held their first arena show at the University of Central Florida, at Orlando. They also continued to tour, with Campbell recollecting that "It was actually really hard to manage it. One night, I drove my car from Tallahassee to Indiana with all the productions from LIC -- black lights, tarps, paint. We drove overnight, took mad energy drinks. We've done it all."

=== 2012-present: Life in Color ===
Shortly after Dayglow's acquisition by SFX Entertainment in 2012, the company announced in September 2012 that it would re-brand itself as Life in Color. All four members of The Committee retained their positions in the company. In 2013, Life in Color began to hold larger music festival events, featuring multiple stages and a larger lineup, leading to the Life in Color Festival in Miami.
