= Life in Color =

American EDM event company

- Type: Private company
- Industry: Concert tours, event production
- Predecessor: Dayglow, Committee Entertainment
- Founded: 2006 as Dayglow; 2012 as Life in Color
- Headquarters: Florida, United States
- Key people: Sebastian Solano, Paul Campbell, Lukasz Tracz, Patryk Tracz, Roberto Williams
- Owner: SFX Entertainment (partial stake)
- Divisions: Committee Entertainment
- Website: lifeincolor.com

Life in Color Festival
- Genre: Dance, EDM, house, dubstep
- Location: Miami, Florida
- Years active: 2006–2019

Life in Color was a United States–based EDM event company, best known for their "paint party" Life in Color concert tours. The company was founded by Sebastian Solano, Paul Campbell, Lukasz Tracz and Patryk Tracz as Committee Entertainment and the concert tour Dayglow in 2006. Billed by its organizers as the "world's largest paint party", the tour features performances by electronic musicians, joined by artistic performers and the tour's signature spraying of the audience with paint throughout the show. The company changed to its current name shortly after it was acquired by Robert F. X. Sillerman's SFX Entertainment in late 2012, with the original founders remaining as partners.

Beginning in 2013, the promotion began to produce Life in Color Festival, a music festival with multiple stages and a larger lineup of performers. Life in Color's annual festival event in Miami is considered to be its flagship.

Due to the COVID-19 pandemic, several festivals of this nature were postponed, and Life in Color was no exception. However, to date they have not published whether this event will continue to be held. Since, their social networks are abandoned.

== Event elements ==
CEO Sebastian Solano (Colombian) has described the increasingly choreographed Life in Color events as being "almost like a Broadway show, but with such an energized crowd you would need to see it to believe it"; the shows feature live sets by DJs accompanied by various artistic, circus-styled performers. Throughout the show, the audience is sprayed with non-toxic paint through various means (including hoses on-stage and personal paint bottles); attendees are encouraged to dress in white clothing to serve as a "canvas" for the paint. A countdown is also held to a special "paint blast" during the show, which features a mixture of paint and confetti.

== Key people ==
- Sebastian Solano – CEO and President, co-founder
- Lukasz Tracz – Co-founder
- Paul Campbell – Owner and managing partner, co-founder
- Patryk Tracz – Vice President and Event Director, co-founder

== Company history ==
=== 2006: The Committee ===
Life in Color was founded as Dayglow by four students living in Florida in 2006. Sebastian Solano, Paul Campbell, Lukasz Tracz and Patryk Tracz all were housemates at an apartment on the Florida State University (FSU) campus. That year all four began throwing themed "super extravagant house parties" on a monthly basis, bringing in DJ Climax for the music. Reinvesting the monthly profits, often at a loss, eventually they began renting "half a nightclub" at a time with bottle and limousine service, then bringing the party back to their house afterwards. As the parties grew in size and popularity, the four founders named themselves Committee Entertainment, planning events as partners. All founders were avid fans of house music, and took different roles. Clubs soon began paying the small company to bring their parties, and according to Solano, they were some of the few local promoters at the time to focus on EDM.

"[The first DayGlow party I attended] was at a house. There were 300 kids throwing paint all over each other, and house music was rockin' the whole place..."
— CEO Sebastian Solano in 2013

Soon a friend introduced Solano to an informal party series called Dayglow, "a fraternity and sorority tradition at FSU" that involved hundreds of college students in white shirts throwing non-toxic paint on one-another. Solano had recently discovered ID&T's travelling event series Sensation, explaining to Billboard that "I just couldn't believe that a party could be taken to a level where 50,000 people would show up in a stadium. Just to party, right? Not for Madonna. But just for an actual party. Immediately, I started to go deep into research on Sensation, ID&T and founder Duncan Stutterheim. It just really interested me." After experiencing a Dayglow event, Solano felt that it could become the "Sensation of America", and began to pursue the idea of a traveling Dayglow tour.

He and Committee Entertainment registered trademarks for Dayglow, and in 2007 their first Dayglow event was held in a Miami nightclub called Allure, with close to 600 attendees. The company then contacted other Florida cities such as Orlando, Tampa, and Gainesville, and began pitching the Dayglow parties. Eventually they decided to rent out the UCF Arena, though Solano stated that at the time, they "had no idea how to do a real concert." All four founders dropped out of college to pursue the venture.

=== 2007–2011: Dayglow events ===
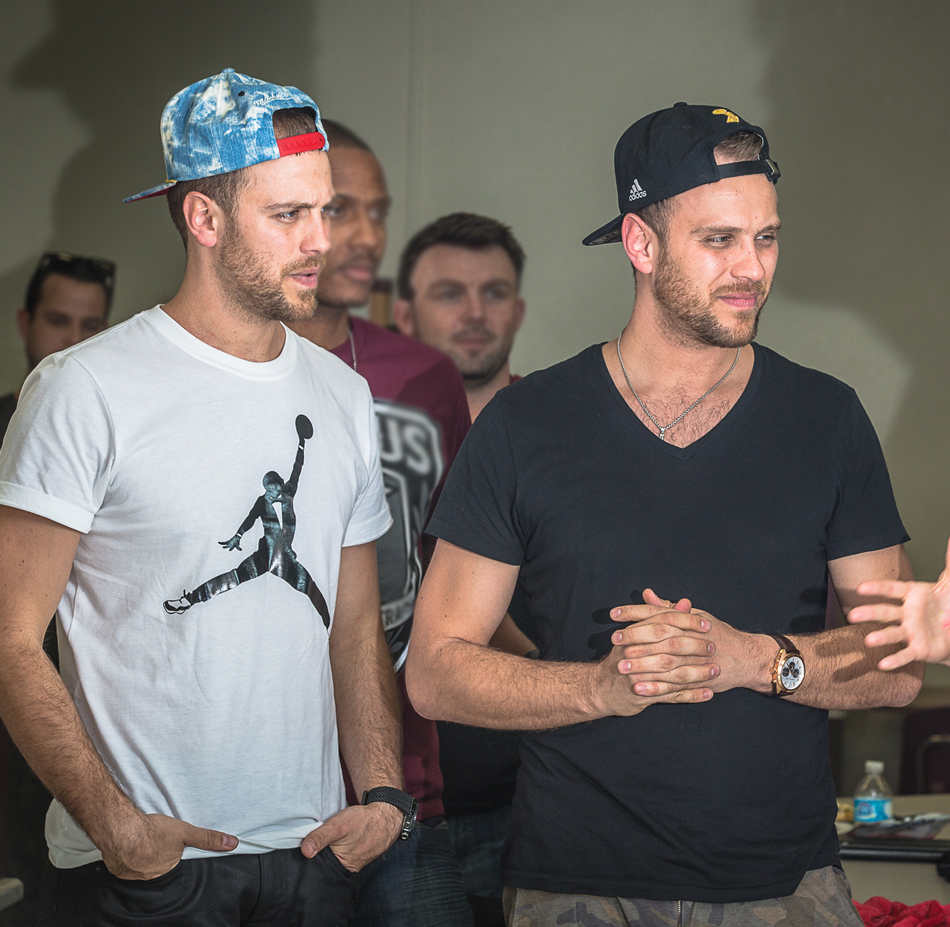
Lukasz Tracz and his twin brother Patryk Tracz directing their new Life In Color Unleash Tour commercial in Miami Florida, January 2014

As the tour increased in popularity, the shows grew more extravagant in nature: booking larger acts and increasing the magnitude of its artistic elements. When the Dayglow tour started traveling to cities outside of Florida, the founders custom-built paint cannons and guns, also hiring someone from Cirque du Soleil to run their performance department. Solano stated in an interview with Pollstar that "We were the first dance music brand, including DJs, to ever do a college tour. Once we did our first college tour, 25 colleges, and sold out every show in about five minutes." By 2009 the tour had become more established, and in 2009 and 2010, a Dayglow stage was held at Ultra Music Festival.

The 2011 Dayglow tour was entitled BLU, standing for "Beats, Love, and Unity"; symbolically, the events featured a special paint blast with blue paint. Also in 2011 shows were held at locations such as the Philadelphia Navy Yard, with headliners such as Roger Sanchez and Diplo. A 2011 stop at Stabler Arena in Bethlehem, Pennsylvania was met with such high demand that, after an initial sell-out, it was moved to Lehigh University's larger Rauch Fieldhouse: the additional tickets quickly sold out as well. However, following the event, 6 attendees were arrested for intoxication and disorderly conduct, while 35 attendees were sent to local hospitals with symptoms of dehydration and possible drug or alcohol use—Robert Mateff, the Northampton County's Director of Emergency Management, considered the scenario to be "atypical" for a planned event in the area. Organizers stated that all attendees were checked for alcohol and other illegal substances before entering.

=== 2012: Acquisition by SFX ===
According to Solano, dance music promoter Disco Donnie served as an early mentor to DayGlow, and on Donnie's recommendation they held back from selling for several years. In 2012 Donnie then connected Solano with investor Bob Sillerman, who at the time was putting together the media conglomerate SFX Entertainment. After negotiations, DayGlow agreed to sell the franchise to SFX, becoming SFX's second acquisition after Disco Donnie. Stated Solano, "It wasn’t just about the money but it was about the people we were going to be working with... people like Shelly Finkel, Bob Sillerman and Mitch Slater." Also, "[We liked] the idea of SFX being global." After the acquisition by SFX, all four founders remained executives in the company.

Shortly after its acquisition, the company announced in September 2012 that it would re-brand itself as Life in Color. The company's late-2012 tour was entitled The E.N.D.: Electronic Never Dies. On December 31, 2012, a special Life in Color NYE Bash was held and webcast from Atlantic City, headlined by Steve Aoki, Tommy Trash, and Adventure Club.

=== Since 2013: Festivals, international expansion ===
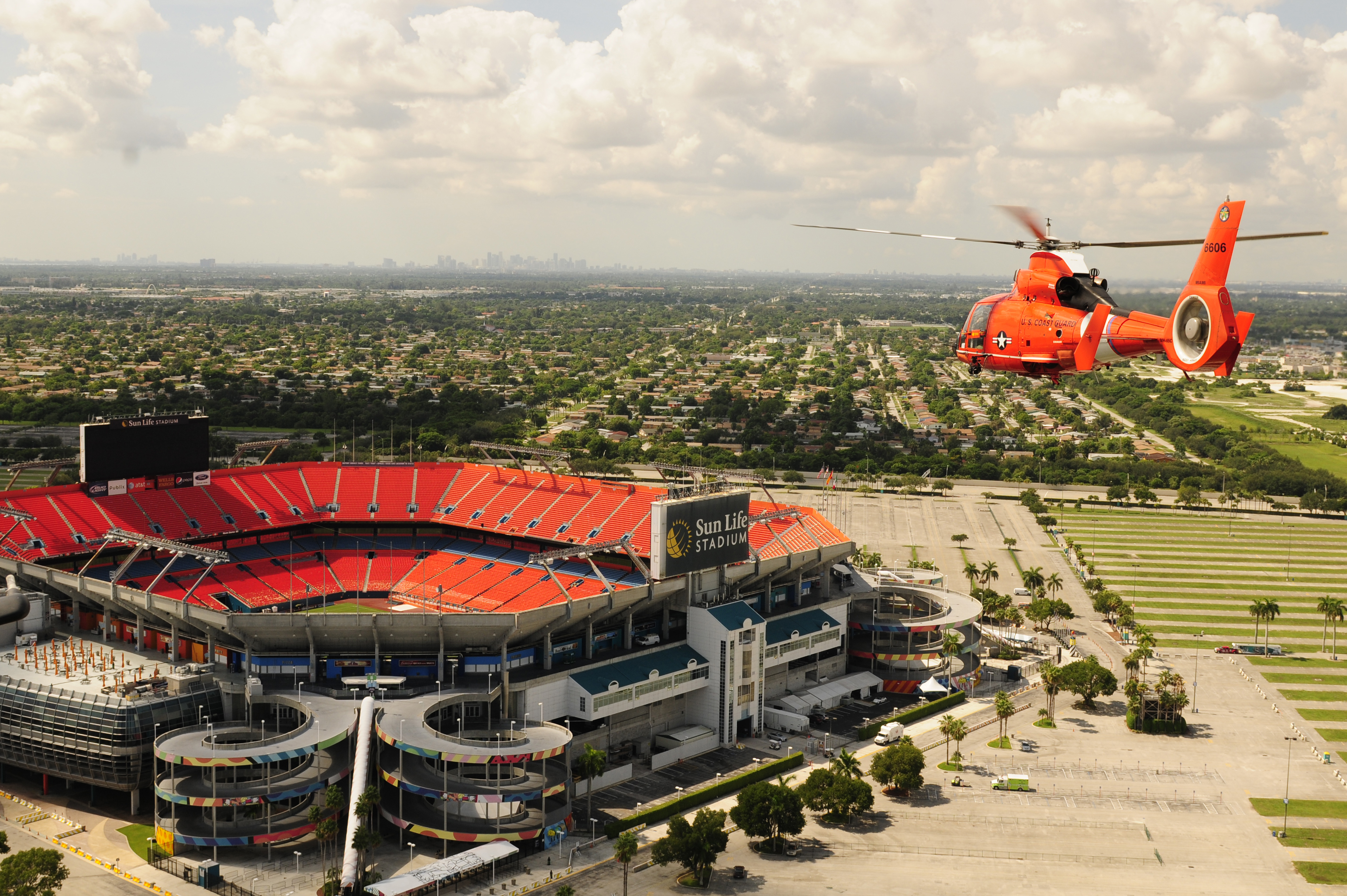
The first Life in Color Festival was held in the parking lot of the Hard Rock Stadium (pictured) in Miami, Florida

The 2013 tour was entitled Life in Color Rebirth. It toured in over 25 countries, with a plan to expand the following year. At that point, headlining DJs had included Afrojack, Axwell, Alesso, Benny Benassi, Chuckie, R3hab, etc. Regular features in shows beyond "paint blasts" included "aerial acts, stilt walkers, contortionists, and fire shows." In 2013, Life in Color began to hold larger music festival events, featuring multiple stages and a larger lineup. The first of these two one-day festivals occurred in Washington, D.C., on September 21, 2013.

On August 7, 2013, organizers announced that a Life in Color Festival would be held outside Sun Life Stadium in Miami on December 27, 2013. The announcement coincided with the final of the 2013 International Champions Cup soccer tournament, which was also held at Sun Life Stadium; R3hab and David Solano performed during pre-game and halftime festivities respectively as part of the announcement, making them the "first EDM brand to produce a nationally televised halftime show in North America." According to Solano, the Miami festival was the new "flagship" event of the company as of 2013, with goals to plot festivals on every continent in 2014. The event featured multiple stages, and featured appearances by 2 Chainz, Calvin Harris, Diplo, Excision, and Major Lazer among others. The 2013 festival had 25,000 attendees over one night.

The 2014 arena tour was entitled Unleash, and Solano stated in an interview stated that as of June 25, 2014 they had shows in 55 countries. An April 2014 Life in Color event in Malaysia, headlined by Fedde le Grand, was planned in partnership with local promoter Future Sound Asia, but cancelled in March 2014 out of respect for drug-related deaths at Future Music Festival Asia (which caused the final day of the festival to be cancelled) and an unrelated, but similar incident at an A State of Trance 650 event in North Jakarta the same weekend.

Life in Color returned to the 2014 International Champions Cup final to announce its 2014 festival with a halftime performance by Martin Garrix. The 2014 festival was expanded to two days, December 26 and 27, 2014: Solano expected a total attendance of at least 60,000. The event was headlined by Adventure Club, Borgore, The Chainsmokers, Diplo, Kaskade, Nervo, and Madeon among others, and also featured an attempt to set a Guinness World Record for the "most people covered in paint at one time".

On January 5, 2015, Forbes included Solano on their annual list of "30 Under 30 In Music" for 2015. He was the only event owner on the list, which largely included musicians and producers such as Martin Garrix and Afrojack.

In November 2015, SFX Entertainment promoted Solano to CEO of ID&T North America and Made Event; in addition to his role as head of Life in Color, he will also oversee Electric Zoo and the North American editions of ID&T's festival brands, including Mysteryland and TomorrowWorld.

== Life in Color Tours ==
Life in Color tours
Year	Tour Name	Locales	Notes
2011	Life In Color: Beats, Love & Unity	Various	Featured a special blue paint blast.
2012	Life In Color: The E.N.D	Various	Traveling tour.
2012	Life In Color: NYE Bash	Atlantic City	On December 31, 2012, a special event was held and webcast from Atlantic City, headlined by Steve Aoki, Tommy Trash, and Adventure Club.
2013	Life In Color: Rebirth	Various	Traveling tour.
2014	Life In Color: Unleash	Various	Traveling tour.
2015	Life In Color: Big Bang	Various	Traveling tour.
2016	Life In Color: Kingdom	Various	Traveling tour.
2017	Life In Color: 10 Years of Color	Various	Traveling tour.

== Life in Color Festival ==
Life in Color Festival
Year	Date	Location	Selected headliners	Details
2013	Dec 28	Miami, Florida	2 Chainz, Calvin Harris, Diplo, Excision, Major Lazer	Multiple stages at Sun Life Stadium.
2014	Dec 26–27	Miami, Florida	Adventure Club, Borgore, The Chainsmokers, Diplo, Kaskade, Nervo, Madeon	Expanded to two days.
2016	Jan 16	Miami, Florida	Jack Ü, Steve Aoki, Flosstradamus, Zeds Dead, Big Sean	Reduced to one day.
2017	Jan 28	Miami, Florida	Diplo, Carnage, Marshmello, Young Thug, Seven Lions, TriTonal, Illenium, Desiigner, Mija, Ookay, Solano, and Doctor P.	10th anniversary
2018	Jan 14	Miami, Florida	ZEDD, 21 SAVAGE, SNAILS, BLACKBEAR, K?D, LIL PUMP, PARKER, QUIX, ANTHONY PISANO	

== See also ==
- List of electronic music festivals
