= LiveStyle =

American live events conglomerate

LiveStyle, Inc.
- Formerly: SFX Entertainment (2012–2016)
- Type: Private
- Industry: Event promotion
- Founded: June 2012; 14 years ago
- Founder: Robert F. X. Sillerman
- Headquarters: Los Angeles, California, United States
- Website: livestyle.com

LiveStyle, Inc. is a Los Angeles-based live events conglomerate founded by media entrepreneur Robert F. X. Sillerman. The company was formed in June 2012 as SFX Entertainment—the new incarnation of Sillerman's previous company of the same name, which was sold to Clear Channel Communications in 2000 and later spun-off as Live Nation in 2005.

The company focuses primarily on live events and other properties relating to electronic music and its associated culture. Its holdings included ownership of various major electronic music promoters and festival brands, such as Mysteryland, and Defqon.1, among others. The company also owns Beatport, an online electronic music store, and Paylogic, a provider of online ticketing services.

Growing primarily through the acquisitions of various electronic dance music properties, SFX went public on the NASDAQ on October 9, 2013. However, in 2015, the company began to experience financial issues; in August 2015, the company's stock value fell as low as 91 cents. After a failed bid by Sillerman to buy out or sell the company, and a breached preferred investment, SFX filed for chapter 11 bankruptcy protection in February 2016, and Sillerman stepped down as CEO. In December 2016, the company emerged from bankruptcy as a private company, renamed LiveStyle, and with former AEG Live executive Randy Phillips as CEO and Charles Ciongoli, formerly of the Universal Music Group, as Executive VP & CFO.

== History ==
=== Origins ===
The original SFX Entertainment was formed by Robert F. X. Sillerman in 1996. Its business model surrounded the acquisition and consolidation of regional concert promoters into a single national entity. In 2000, Sillerman sold that company to the radio broadcasting firm Clear Channel Communications for US$4.4 billion. Clear Channel Entertainment was spun off in 2005 to form Live Nation, which merged with Ticketmaster in 2010 to form Live Nation Entertainment. As of 2012, Live Nation is the largest concert promoter in the world.

=== 2012–2013 ===
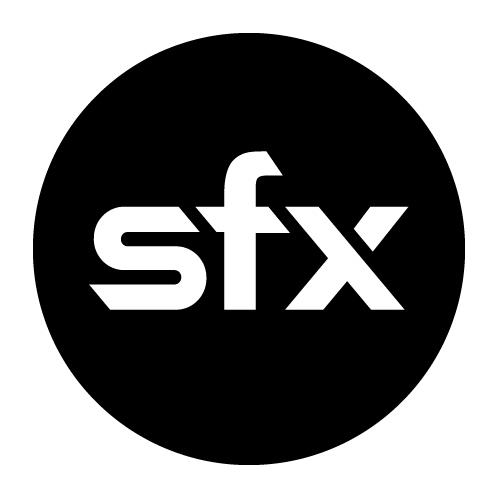
Former logo, used until 2016.

In June 2012, Sillerman publicized his intent to focus on the growing electronic dance music market by reviving the SFX brand to form a new conglomerate in the electronic music industry. Similarly to the past incarnation of SFX, the company's business model focuses on the consolidation and acquisition of independent EDM promoters, along with an additional focus on providing digital platforms for fans to connect. Sillerman expected to spend close to $1 billion on acquisitions within the first year of operations alone; at the time of the company's launch, SFX was in negotiations with around 50 different promoters for possible acquisitions. SFX's first acquisitions included "Disco" Donnie Estopinal's Disco Productions, Miami nightclub owners Opium Group and Miami Marketing Group, and the tour Life in Color (then known as Dayglow). However, the Opium Group deal fell through during the due diligence phase. As one of Sillerman's first deals, Estopinal assisted him in locating other potential acquisition targets.

By contrast to the previous SFX, Sillerman intended the new company to be more focused on building relationships and experiences for fans. In response to critics who believed that SFX may "commercialize" the largely underground electronic music industry, Sillerman stated that "if you buy great and successful businesses, you try to empower them to do what they do. And in this case, what they do is provide great entertainment. If you or anyone can ever find an example of someone from SFX telling them how much to charge for a bottle of Cristal at LIV, I'll give you my shares of SFX." Sillerman has emphasized his belief that the live events industry can not be operated in a centralized manner, noting that SFX is "decentralized with full power invested in the entrepreneurs who have made these businesses."

In January 2013, SFX named Chris Stephenson as its chief marketing officer—he had previously been the CMO of Interscope Records, and is the CEO of fellow Sillerman venture Viggle. SFX also announced a joint venture with the Dutch promoter ID&T with an intent to organize North American events—ID&T previously partnered with Live Nation to hold the first ever American edition of its Sensation tour at Barclays Center in Brooklyn. Sillerman also stated in a Billboard interview that SFX had acquired New Orleans' Voodoo Experience festival, although it was later discovered that this had not actually occurred (in October 2013, a 51% majority was sold to Live Nation).

In February 2013, SFX acquired Beatport, an online music store specializing in electronic music. In particular, Sillerman felt that the website provided a "massive" platform for both artists and fans to interact; being consistent with his goals for the company. The following month during the Winter Music Conference in Miami, SFX announced that it would acquire a 75% stake in ID&T, and that it would organize a spin-off of its flagship festival Tomorrowland known as TomorrowWorld in the Atlanta area in September 2013. The company also received a $10 million investment from the communications services and marketing company WPP.

=== 2013–2015 ===
In June 2013, SFX announced an IPO and began trading on the NASDAQ on October 9, 2013. Sillerman was joined by the Dutch producer Afrojack at the NASDAQ MarketSite that morning to ring the opening bell. Following its IPO, SFX also reached deals to acquire companies focused on digital properties; the fan monetization platform Tunezy, and the web development companies Arc90 and Fame House. It also acquired Totem OneLove, an Australian promoter who organizes the Stereosonic festival among others.

In November 2013, SFX acquired Made Event, the organizers of New York City's Electric Zoo festival. Sillerman considered the purchase to be a strategic move, as the company would now have a stronger presence in the New York market. It also acquired the German promoter i-Motion, organizers of the Nature One festival among others, for $21 million, and reached a deal with Rock in Rio founder Roberto Midina to acquire a 50% stake in a new entity that would own the festival, and organize Rock in Rio USA.

In December 2013, SFX acquired a 75% stake in Paylogic, a European online ticketing company. Paylogic's services are prominently used by ID&T, and were to be phased in across SFX's other event brands over time as deals with other providers (such as Eventbrite and Disco Donnie) expire. Sillerman singled out Paylogic for its ability to handle large "surges" of ticket sales, as had been demonstrated at TomorrowWorld, the first U.S. event to use the system.

On January 6, 2014, SFX announced a partnership with Clear Channel to co-produce EDM-related content for its properties, which included plans for a syndicated Beatport countdown show on its contemporary hit radio (CHR) stations, a national talent search, and an "original live music series" patterned after its Jingle Ball concert franchise. In February 2014, SFX acquired React Presents—organizers of Chicago's Spring Awakening, along with Clubtix and West Loop Management. In April 2014, SFX announced a partnership with Simon Cowell's Syco Entertainment and T-Mobile to develop an EDM-focused television reality series, Ultimate DJ. In September 2014, SFX acquired Brazilian promoter Plus Talent, who organize XXXperience and Tomorrowland Brazil. On October 10, 2014, SFX acquired Listn, a Montreal-based startup that developed a mobile app which allowed users to browse their friends' music collections. Listn's employees were reassigned to Beatport, and the service was phased out.

In November 2014, despite a total revenue of $143.5 million in the third quarter of 2014—a number boosted by the large number of SFX-managed festivals that occurred during the quarter, Sillerman reported that SFX was undergoing a significant restructuring and consolidation process that would involve "a not insignificant shift in assignments and reduction in workforce, all of which will go to improve efficiency and, of course, to improve our EBITDA." Later in the month, SFX acquired a 50% stake in ALDA Events, a Dutch promoter who produces the concert tours of Armin van Buuren and Hardwell, along with the Amsterdam Music Festival. Alda will remain independently operated, but its founder Allan Hardenberg also joined SFX as the managing director of its Global Touring division.

On January 26, 2015, SFX announced restructuring at the executive level: Greg Consiglio was named president and chief operating officer of SFX Entertainment, while Kevin Arrix was named chief revenue officer and executive vice president. Both Consiglio and Arrix hold the same positions at Viggle. ID&T's Ritty van Straalen became CEO of live entertainment. Additionally, it was announced that SFX would, under a three-year pact, assume the operation of Viggle's sales staff, who will work for both SFX and Viggle; Sillerman explained that "the Viggle Revenue team brings an immediate new dimension, while combining the SFX inventory provides Viggle with more scale attractive to a broader base of advertisers."

==== Decline and bankruptcy ====
On February 25, 2015, Sillerman announced a proposal to buy out SFX's public stock at $4.75 per-share to take the company private, and support exploring a potential sale. He felt that the offer would provide "substantial value and flexibility to all shareholders", and was a "substantial premium" to its current value.

By August 2015, the value of SFX stock had decreased considerably, going as low as 91 cents per-share. On August 14, 2015, the company failed a takeover bid, initiated by Sillerman, valued at $5.75 a share. According to the Los Angeles Times, SFX Entertainment is looking into "strategic alternatives" until October 2015 to determine the sale of the company. The company extended its takeover bid deadline in October 2015. In November 2015, Sillerman breached a preferred investment of $30 million into SFX Entertainment. Also in November, Sebastian Solano, founder of SFX's Life in Color brand, was named CEO of ID&T North America and Made Event. On January 13, 2016, the company announced that it had defaulted on a $10.8 million loan after missing a January 3, 2016 interest payment of $3 million. On January 15, 2016, SFX announced that it had received $20 million in new funding.

On February 1, 2016, SFX Entertainment filed for chapter 11 bankruptcy. The company planned to restructure as a private entity, and engage in a debt-for-equity swap with its bondholders. Sillerman also stepped down as CEO effective immediately; he remained chairman and retained his 40% stock interest in the company. Of the situation, he stated that "this expression of confidence from our lenders is testimonial to the vibrancy and potential of our business", and that with the restructuring, "we have the opportunity to achieve all that SFX can and will be." The bankruptcy and transition did not affect any of SFX's festivals, although the fate of the U.S. TomorrowWorld festival (whose 2015 edition was marred by infrastructural problems due to bad weather) was uncertain. The Belgian and Brazilian Tomorrowland festivals are managed directly by ID&T or local partners, and are not affected.

On March 1, 2016, SFX announced an intent to sell Beatport and Fame House at auction. In May 2016, the auction of Beatport was suspended, and the site cut its original content and streaming businesses. Later that month, Fame House was sold to Universal Music Group for $1 million and the assumption of $400,000 in debt. Flavorus was sold to Vivendi for $4 million.

In an interview with Billboard, Sillerman admitted that there were "no easy answers" surrounding why the company collapsed, but added that he didn't "begrudge the disappointment and anger" of his staff because he was just as disappointed over the company's performance. Former employees also interviewed by Billboard felt that the company did not do enough to leverage its scale, and that the company did not engage in centralization, leading to a lack of coordination between its collection of subsidiaries.

=== Emergence and re-branding ===
In December 2016, SFX emerged from bankruptcy, reducing its debt by $400 million. Randy Phillips, formerly of AEG Live, was named the company's new CEO. The company was also renamed LiveStyle, with its headquarters re-located to Los Angeles. Phillips felt that SFX as a brand had garnered a negative reputation, and that the company had originally collapsed because it focused too much on growing quickly, performing an IPO, and Sillerman "[selling] a story about sponsorship", which "has to be the icing on the cake – not the cake itself." Phillips also began to describe the company as being oriented towards electronic music in general rather than EDM as a culture, and stated that some of their events (such as Mysteryland) would broaden their scope (similarly to the Coachella Festival, which is owned by his former employer), but other events would remain predominantly oriented towards electronic music.

In May 2018, stakes in Rock in Rio, including the stakes held by SFX's creditor committee, were sold to Live Nation Entertainment. In 2019, Phillips stepped down as CEO to focus on managing the band Why Don't We, but remained in a consulting role. Afterward, the company began to divest some of its live music assets, with Disco Donnie Presents being bought back by its namesake in 2020, React Presents acquired by LiveXLive, ID&T being bought by Providence Equity Partners-backed Superstruct Entertainment in 2021 (although the acquisition did not include Tomorrowland, which was divested to the Belgian company Weareone.world), and Electric Zoo acquired by Avant Gardner in 2022.

== Assets ==
=== Festivals and promoters ===
- Life in Color
- i-Motion
  - Nature One
  - Syndicate
- b2s
- Monumental Productions B.V.
  - Awakenings

=== Digital ===
- Arc90
- Beatport
- Paylogic (75%)
- Tunezy

=== Former assets ===
- Disco Productions
  - Disco Donnie Presents
  - Sun City Music Festival
- Made Event
  - Electric Zoo
- ID&T (75% stake)
  - Amsterdam Music Festival
  - Mysteryland
  - Q-dance
    - Defqon.1
    - Qlimax
  - Sensation
  - Thunderdome
  - Tomorrowland
    - TomorrowWorld
  - Energy
- Totem OneLove
  - Stereosonic
  - Creamfields Australia
