= Electronic dance music =

Broad category of electronic music

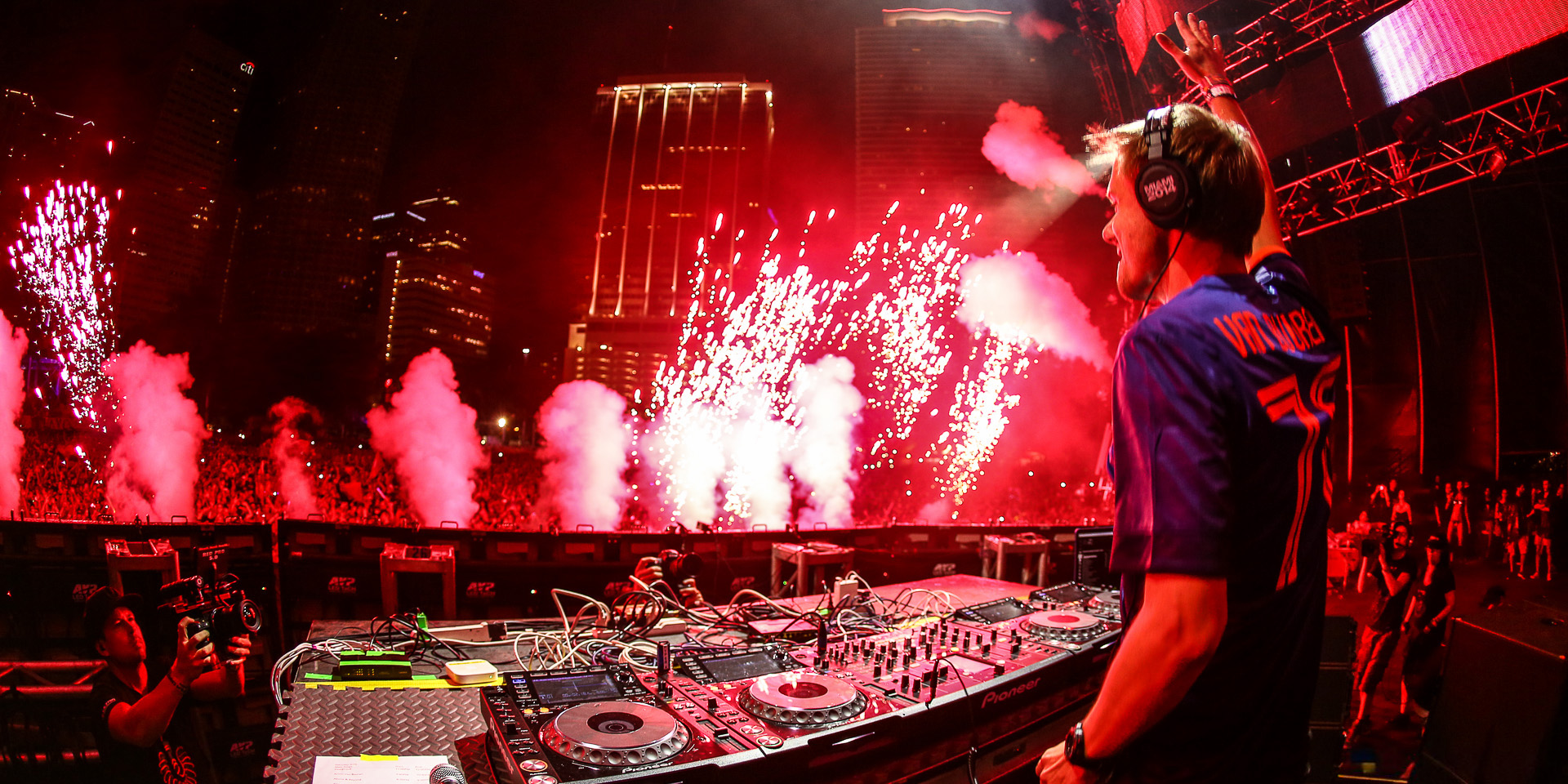
Dutch trance DJ Armin van Buuren performing at Ultra Music Festival, a major EDM festival

Electronic dance music (EDM), also referred to as dance music or club music, is a broad range of percussive electronic music genres originally made for nightclubs, raves, and festivals. It is generally produced for playback by DJs who create seamless selections of tracks, called a DJ mix, by segueing from one recording to another. EDM producers also perform their music live in a concert or festival setting in what is sometimes called a live PA. Since its inception, EDM has expanded to include a wide range of subgenres.

During the late 1980s to early 1990s, following the emergence of electronic music instruments, rave culture, pirate radio, party crews, underground festivals, and an upsurge of interest in club culture, EDM achieved mainstream popularity in Europe and Japan. However, rave culture was not as broadly popular in the United States; it was not typically seen outside of the regional scenes in New York City, Florida, the Midwest, and California. Although the pioneer genres of electro, Chicago house and Detroit techno were influential both in Europe and the United States, mainstream media outlets and the record industry in the United States remained openly hostile to it until the 1990s and beyond. There was also a perceived association between EDM and drug culture, which led governments at state and city levels to enact laws and policies intended to halt the spread of rave culture.

Subsequently, in the new millennium, the popularity of EDM increased globally, particularly in the United States and Australia. By the early 2010s, the term "electronic dance music" and the initialism "EDM" was being pushed by the American music industry and music press in an effort to rebrand American rave culture. Despite the industry's attempt to create a specific EDM brand, the name remains in use as an umbrella term for multiple genres, including dance-pop, house, techno, electro and trance, as well as their respective subgenres, which all predate the name.

== History ==
Various EDM genres have evolved over the last 40 years, for example; house, techno, drum and bass, dance-pop etc. Stylistic variation within an established EDM genre can lead to the emergence of what is called a subgenre. Hybridization, where elements of two or more genres are combined, can lead to the emergence of an entirely new genre of EDM.

=== Precursors ===
In the late 1960s bands such as Silver Apples created electronic music intended for dancing. Other early examples of music that influenced later electronic dance music include Jamaican dub music during the late 1960s to 1970s, the synthesizer-based disco music of Italian producer Giorgio Moroder in the late 1970s, and the electropop of Kraftwerk and Yellow Magic Orchestra in the mid-to-late 1970s.

==== Dub ====
Author Michael Veal considers dub music, a Jamaican music stemming from roots reggae and sound system culture that flourished between 1968 and 1985, to be one of the important precursors to contemporary electronic dance music. Dub productions were remixed reggae tracks that emphasized rhythm, fragmented lyrical and melodic elements, and reverberant textures. The music was pioneered by studio engineers, such as King Tubby, Errol Thompson, Lee "Scratch" Perry, and Scientist. Their productions included forms of tape editing and sound processing that Veal considers comparable to techniques used in musique concrète. Dub producers made improvised deconstructions of existing multi-track reggae mixes by using the studio mixing board as a performance instrument. They also foregrounded spatial effects such as reverb and delay by using auxiliary send routings creatively. The Roland Space Echo, manufactured by Roland Corporation, was widely used by dub producers in the 1970s to produce echo and delay effects.

Despite the limited electronic equipment available to dub pioneers such as King Tubby and Lee "Scratch" Perry, their experiments in remix culture were musically cutting-edge. Ambient dub was pioneered by King Tubby and other Jamaican sound artists, using DJ-inspired ambient electronics, complete with drop-outs, echo, equalization and psychedelic electronic effects. It featured layering techniques and incorporated elements of world music, deep bass lines and harmonic sounds. Techniques such as a long echo delay were also used.

==== Hip-hop ====
Hip-hop has had some influence in the development of electronic dance music since the 1970s. Inspired by Jamaican sound system culture Jamaican-American DJ Kool Herc introduced large bass heavy speaker rigs to the Bronx. His parties are credited with having kick-started the New York City hip-hop movement in 1973. A technique developed by DJ Kool Herc that became popular in hip-hop culture was playing two copies of the same record on two turntables, in alternation, and at the point where a track featured a break. This technique was further used to manually loop a purely percussive break, leading to what was later called a break beat.

Turntablism has origins in the invention of the direct-drive turntable, by Shuichi Obata, an engineer at Matsushita (now Panasonic). In 1969, Matsushita released it as the SP-10, the first direct-drive turntable on the market, and the first in their influential Technics series of turntables. The most influential turntable was the Technics SL-1200, which was developed in 1971 by a team led by Shuichi Obata at Matsushita, which then released it onto the market in 1972. In the 1980s and 1990s hip-hop DJs used turntables as musical instruments in their own right and virtuosic use developed into a creative practice called turntablism.

==== Disco ====
In 1974, George McCrae's early disco hit "Rock Your Baby" was one of the first records to use a drum machine, an early Roland rhythm machine. The use of drum machines in disco production was influenced by Sly and the Family Stone's "Family Affair" (1971), with its rhythm echoed in McCrae's "Rock Your Baby", and Timmy Thomas' "Why Can't We Live Together" (1972). Disco producer Biddu used synthesizers in several disco songs from 1976 to 1977, including "Bionic Boogie" from Rain Forest (1976), "Soul Coaxing" (1977), and Eastern Man and Futuristic Journey (recorded from 1976 to 1977).

Acts like Donna Summer, Chic, Earth, Wind & Fire, Heatwave, and the Village People helped define the late 1970s disco sound. Giorgio Moroder and Pete Bellotte produced "I Feel Love" for Donna Summer in 1977. It became the first well-known disco hit to have a completely synthesized backing track. Other disco producers, most famously American producer Tom Moulton, grabbed ideas and techniques from dub music (which came with the increased Jamaican migration to New York City in the 1970s) to provide alternatives to the four-on-the-floor style that dominated. During the early 1980s, the popularity of disco music sharply declined in the United States, abandoned by major US record labels and producers. Euro disco continued evolving within the broad mainstream pop music scene.

==== Synth-pop ====
Synth-pop (short for synthesizer pop; also called techno-pop) is a music genre that first became prominent in the late 1970s and features the synthesizer as the dominant musical instrument. It was prefigured in the 1960s and early 1970s by the use of synthesizers in progressive rock, electronic, art rock, disco.

Early synth-pop pioneers included Japanese group Yellow Magic Orchestra, and British bands Ultravox, the Human League and Berlin Blondes. The Human League used monophonic synthesizers to produce music with a simple and austere sound. After the breakthrough of Gary Numan in the UK Singles Chart in 1979, large numbers of artists began to enjoy success with a synthesizer-based sound in the early 1980s, including late-1970s debutants like Japan and Orchestral Manoeuvres in the Dark, and newcomers such as Depeche Mode and Eurythmics. In Japan, Yellow Magic Orchestra's success opened the way for synth-pop bands such as P-Model, Plastics, and Hikashu. The development of inexpensive polyphonic synthesizers, the definition of MIDI and the use of dance beats, led to a more commercial and accessible sound for synth-pop. This, its adoption by the style-conscious acts from the New Romantic movement, together with the rise of MTV, led to success for large numbers of British synth-pop acts (including Duran Duran and Spandau Ballet) in the United States.

The use of digital sampling and looping in popular music was pioneered by Japanese electronic music band Yellow Magic Orchestra (YMO). Their approach to sampling was a precursor to the contemporary approach of constructing music by cutting fragments of sounds and looping them using computer technology. "Computer Game/Firecracker" (1978) interpolated a Martin Denny melody, and sampled Space Invaders video game sounds. Technodelic (1981) introduced the use of digital sampling in popular music, as the first album consisting of mostly samples and loops. The album was produced using Toshiba-EMI's LMD-649 digital PCM sampler, which engineer Kenji Murata custom-built for YMO. The LMD-649 was also used for sampling by other Japanese synthpop artists in the early 1980s, including YMO-associated acts such as Chiemi Manabe and Logic System.

=== 1980s ===
The emergence of electronic dance music in the 1980s was shaped by the development of several new electronic musical instruments, particularly those from the Japanese Roland Corporation. The Roland TR-808 (often abbreviated as the "808") notably played an important role in the evolution of dance music. In 1980, Ryuichi Sakamoto's cult hit "Riot in Lagos" from the album B-2 Unit introduced the 808 to clubs, demonstrating a new type of electro music that laid the groundwork for modern dance music, making it one of the most important tracks in the history of dance music. In 1982, Afrika Bambaataa's "Planet Rock" (1982) made the 808 very popular on dancefloors. The track, influenced by Sakamoto's "Riot in Lagos" as well as Kraftwerk, informed the development of electronic dance music, and subgenres including Miami bass and Detroit techno, and popularized the 808 as a "fundamental element of futuristic sound". According to Slate, "Planet Rock" "didn't so much put the 808 on the map so much as reorient an entire world of post-disco dance music around it". The Roland TR-909, TB-303 and Juno-60 similarly influenced electronic dance music such as techno, house and acid.

==== Post-disco ====
During the post-disco era that followed the backlash against "disco" which began in the mid to late 1979, which in the United States lead to civil unrest and a riot in Chicago known as the Disco Demolition Night,^{[13]} an underground movement of "stripped-down" disco inspired music featuring "radically different sounds"^{[14]} started to emerge on the East Coast.^{[15] [Note 1]} This new scene was seen primarily in the New York metropolitan area and was initially led by the urban contemporary artists that were responding to the over-commercialization and subsequent demise of disco culture. The sound that emerged originated from P-Funk^{[18]} the electronic side of disco, dub music, and other genres. Much of the music produced during this time was, like disco, catering to a singles-driven market.^{[14]} At this time creative control started shifting to independent record companies, less established producers, and club DJs.^{[14]} Other dance styles that began to become popular during the post-disco era include dance-pop,^{[19] [20]} boogie,^{[14]} electro, Hi-NRG, Italo disco, house,^{[19] [21] [22] [23]} and techno.^{[22] [24] [25] [26] [27]}

==== Electro ====
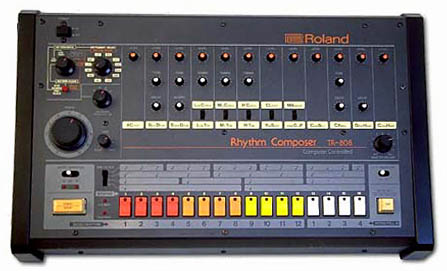
The instrument that provided electro's synthesized programmed drum beats, the Roland TR-808 drum machine.

In the early 1980s, electro (short for "electro-funk") emerged as a fusion of synth-pop, funk, and boogie. Also called electro-funk or electro-boogie, but later shortened to electro, cited pioneers include Ryuichi Sakamoto, Afrika Bambaataa, Zapp, D.Train, and Sinnamon. Early hip-hop and rap combined European and Japanese electropop influences such as Giorgio Moroder, Dan Lacksman (Telex) and Yellow Magic Orchestra inspired the birth of electro. As the electronic sound developed, instruments such as the bass guitar and drums were replaced by synthesizers and most notably by iconic drum machines, particularly the Roland TR-808 and the Yamaha DX7. Early uses of the TR-808 include Sakamoto's "Riot in Lagos" in 1980, several Yellow Magic Orchestra tracks during 1980–1981, the 1982 track "Planet Rock" by Afrika Bambaataa, and the 1982 song "Sexual Healing" by Marvin Gaye. In 1982, producer Arthur Baker, with Afrika Bambaataa, released the seminal "Planet Rock", which was influenced by Yellow Magic Orchestra (Ryuichi Sakamoto - Riot In Lagos 1980) and had drum beats supplied by the TR-808. Planet Rock was followed later that year by another breakthrough electro record, "Nunk" by Warp 9. In 1983, Hashim created an electro-funk sound with "Al-Naafyish (The Soul)" that influenced Herbie Hancock, resulting in his hit single "Rockit" the same year. The early 1980s were electro's mainstream peak. According to author Steve Taylor, Afrika Bambaataa's Planet Rock serves as a "template for all interesting dance music since".

==== House music ====
In the early 1980s, Chicago radio jocks The Hot Mix 5 and club DJs Ron Hardy and Frankie Knuckles played various styles of dance music, including older disco records (mostly Philly disco and Salsoul tracks), Italo Disco, electro funk tracks by artists such as Afrika Bambaataa, newer Italo disco, B-Boy hip-hop by Man Parrish, Jellybean Benitez, Arthur Baker, and John Robie, and electronic pop music by Giorgio Moroder and Yellow Magic Orchestra. Some made and played their own edits of their favorite songs on reel-to-reel tape, and sometimes mixed in effects, drum machines, and other rhythmic electronic instrumentation. The hypnotic electronic dance song "On and On", produced in 1984 by Chicago DJ Jesse Saunders and co-written by Vince Lawrence, had elements that became staples of the early house sound, such as the Roland TB-303 bass synthesizer and minimal vocals as well as a Roland (specifically TR-808) drum machine and Korg (specifically Poly-61) synthesizer.

"On and On" is sometimes cited as the 'first house record', though other examples from around that time, such as J.M. Silk's "Music is the Key" (1985), have also been cited. House music quickly spread to American cities including New York City, and Newark, and Detroit—all of which developed their own regional scenes. In the mid-to-late 1980s, house music became popular in Europe as well as major cities in South America, and Australia. Chicago House experienced some commercial success in Europe with releases such as "House Nation" by House Master Boyz and the Rude Boy of House (1987). Following this, a number of house inspired releases such as "Pump Up The Volume" by M|A|R|R|S (1987), "Theme from S'Express" by S'Express (1988), and "Doctorin' the House" by Coldcut (1988) entered the pop charts.

The electronic instrumentation and minimal arrangement of Charanjit Singh's Synthesizing: Ten Ragas to a Disco Beat (1982), an album of Indian ragas performed in a disco style, anticipated the sounds of acid house music, but it is not known to have had any influence on the genre prior to the album's rediscovery in the 21st century.

==== Techno, acid house, rave ====
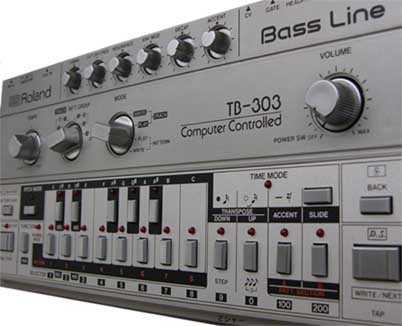
Roland TB-303: The bass line synthesizer that was used prominently in acid house

In the 1980s, Detroit DJs Juan Atkins, Derrick May, and Kevin Saunderson laid the foundation for a new style of music which would dubbed techno. They fused Chicago house influenced electronic and Detroit (including Motown) influenced funk sounds with the mechanical vibes of the post-industrial city, creating the techno sound of four-on-the-floor beat driven by a kick drum on the quarter notes and a snare or high hat on the second, fourth, or eighth notes.

In the mid-1980s house music thrived on the small Balearic Island of Ibiza, Spain. The Balearic sound was the spirit of the music emerging from the island at that time; the combination of old vinyl rock, pop, reggae, and disco records paired with an "anything goes" attitude made Ibiza a hub of drug-induced musical experimentation. A club called Amnesia, whose resident DJ, Alfredo Fiorito, pioneered Balearic house, was the center of the scene. Amnesia became known across Europe and by the mid to late 1980s it was drawing people from all over the continent.

By 1988, house music had become the most popular form of club music in Europe, with acid house developing as a notable trend in the United Kingdom and Germany in the same year. In the UK an established warehouse party subculture, centered on the British African-Caribbean sound system scene fueled underground after-parties that featured dance music exclusively. Also in 1988, the Balearic party vibe associated with Ibiza's DJ Alfredo was transported to London, when Danny Rampling and Paul Oakenfold opened the clubs Shoom and Spectrum, respectively. Both places became synonymous with acid house, and it was during this period that MDMA gained prominence as a party drug. Other important UK clubs included Back to Basics in Leeds, Sheffield's Leadmill and Music Factory, and The Haçienda in Manchester, where Mike Pickering and Graeme Park's spot, Nude, was an important proving ground for American underground dance music. (Note: Fikentscher (2000), p. 5, in discussing the definition of underground dance music as it relates to post-disco music in America, states that: "The prefix 'underground' does not merely serve to explain that the associated type of music—and its cultural context—are familiar only to a small number of informed persons. Underground also points to the sociological function of the music, framing it as one type of music that to have meaning and continuity is kept away, to a large degree, from mainstream society, mass media, and those empowered to enforce prevalent moral and aesthetic codes and values.") The success of house and acid house paved the way for Detroit techno, a style that was initially supported by a handful of house music clubs in Chicago, New York, and Northern England, with Detroit clubs catching up later. The term Techno first came into use after a release of a 10 Records/Virgin Records compilation titled Techno: The Dance Sound of Detroit in 1988.

One of the first Detroit productions to receive wider attention was Derrick May's "Strings of Life" (1987), which, together with May's previous release, "Nude Photo" (1987), helped raise techno's profile in Europe, especially the UK and Germany, during the 1987–1988 house music boom (see Second Summer of Love). It became May's best-known track, which, according to Frankie Knuckles, "just exploded. It was like something you can't imagine, the kind of power and energy people got off that record when it was first heard. Mike Dunn says he has no idea how people can accept a record that doesn't have a bassline." According to British DJ Mark Moore, "Strings of Life" led London club-goers to accept house: "because most people hated house music and it was all rare groove and hip hop...I'd play 'Strings of Life' at the Mudd Club and clear the floor". (Note: "Although it can now be heard in Detroit's leading clubs, the local area has shown a marked reluctance to get behind the music. It has been in clubs like the Powerplant (Chicago), The World (New York), The Hacienda (Manchester), Rock City (Nottingham), and Downbeat (Leeds) where the techno sound has found most support. Ironically, the only Detroit club which really championed the sound was a peripatetic party night called Visage, which unromantically shared its name with one of Britain's oldest new romantic groups".) By the late 1980s interest in house, acid house and techno escalated in the club scene and MDMA-fueled club-goers, who were faced with a 2 a.m. closing time in the UK, started to seek after-hours refuge at all-night warehouse parties. Within a year, in summer 1989, up to 25,000 people at a time were attending commercially organised underground parties called raves.

=== 1990s ===
==== Trance ====
Trance emerged from the rave scene in the United Kingdom in the late 1980s and developed further during the early 1990s in Germany before spreading throughout the rest of Europe, as a more melodic offshoot from techno and house. At the same time trance music was developing in Europe, the genre was also gathering a following in the Indian state of Goa. Trance is mostly instrumental, although vocals can be mixed in: typically they are performed by mezzo-soprano to soprano female soloists, often without a traditional verse/chorus structure. Structured vocal form in trance music forms the basis of the vocal trance subgenre, which has been described as "grand, soaring, and operatic" and "ethereal female leads floating amongst the synths". Trance music is broken into a number of subgenres including acid trance, classic trance, hard trance, progressive trance, and uplifting trance. Uplifting trance is also known as "anthem trance", "epic trance", "commercial trance", "stadium trance", or "euphoric trance", and has been strongly influenced by classical music in the 1990s and 2000s by leading artists such as Ferry Corsten, Armin Van Buuren, Tiësto, Push, Rank 1 and at present with the development of the subgenre "orchestral uplifting trance" or "uplifting trance with symphonic orchestra" by such artists as Andy Blueman, Ciro Visone, Soundlift, Arctic Moon, Sergey Nevone&Simon O'Shine etc. Closely related to Uplifting Trance is Euro-trance, which has become a general term for a wide variety of highly commercialized European dance music. Several subgenres are crossovers with other major genres of electronic music. For instance, Tech trance is a mixture of trance and techno, and Vocal trance "combines [trance's] progressive elements with pop music". The dream trance genre originated in the mid-1990s, with its popularity then led by Robert Miles.

AllMusic states on progressive trance: "the progressive wing of the trance crowd led directly to a more commercial, chart-oriented sound since trance had never enjoyed much chart action in the first place. Emphasizing the smoother sound of Eurodance or house (and occasionally more reminiscent of Jean-Michel Jarre than Basement Jaxx), Progressive Trance became the sound of the world's dance floors by the end of the millennium. Critics ridiculed its focus on predictable breakdowns and relative lack of skill to beat-mix, but progressive trance was caned by the hottest DJ."

==== Breakbeat hardcore, jungle, drum and bass ====
By the early 1990s, a style of music developed within the rave scene that had an identity distinct from American house and techno. This music, much like hip-hop before it, combined sampled syncopated beats or breakbeats, other samples from a wide range of different musical genres, and, occasionally, samples of music, dialogue, and effects from films and television programmes. Relative to earlier styles of dance music such as house and techno, so-called 'rave music' tended to emphasise bass sounds and use faster tempos, or beats per minute (BPM). This subgenre was known as "hardcore" rave, but from as early as 1991, some musical tracks made up of these high-tempo breakbeats, with heavy basslines and samples of older Jamaican music, were referred to as "jungle techno", a genre influenced by Jack Smooth and Basement Records, and later just "jungle", which became recognized as a separate musical genre popular at raves and on pirate radio in Britain.

By 1994, jungle had begun to gain mainstream popularity, and fans of the music (often referred to as junglists) became a more recognisable part of youth subculture. The genre further developed, incorporating and fusing elements from a wide range of existing musical genres, including the raggamuffin sound, dancehall, MC chants, dub basslines, and increasingly complex, heavily edited breakbeat percussion. Despite the affiliation with the ecstasy-fuelled rave scene, Jungle also inherited some associations with violence and criminal activity, both from the gang culture that had affected the UK's hip-hop scene and as a consequence of jungle's often aggressive or menacing sound and themes of violence (usually reflected in the choice of samples). However, this developed in tandem with the often positive reputation of the music as part of the wider rave scene and dance hall-based Jamaican music culture prevalent in London. By 1995, whether as a reaction to, or independently of this cultural schism, some jungle producers began to move away from the ragga-influenced style and create what would become collectively labelled, for convenience, as drum and bass.

=== 21st century ===
==== Dubstep ====
Dubstep is a genre of electronic dance music that originated in South London in the late 1990s. It is generally characterized by sparse, syncopated rhythmic patterns with bass lines that contain prominent sub-bass frequencies. The style emerged as an offshoot of UK garage, drawing on a lineage of related styles such as 2-step, dub reggae, jungle, broken beat, and grime. In the United Kingdom, the origins of the genre can be traced back to the growth of the Jamaican sound system party scene in the early 1980s.

The earliest known dubstep releases date back to 1998, and were usually featured as B-sides of 2-step garage single releases. These tracks were darker, more experimental remixes with less emphasis on vocals, and attempted to incorporate elements of breakbeat and drum and bass into 2-step. In 2001, this and other strains of dark garage music began to be showcased and promoted at London's nightclub Plastic People, at the "Forward" night (sometimes stylised as FWD>>), which went on to be considered influential to the development of dubstep. The term "dubstep" in reference to a genre of music began to be used around 2002 by labels such as Big Apple, Ammunition, and Tempa, by which time stylistic trends used in creating these remixes started to become more noticeable and distinct from 2-step and grime.

==== Riddim ====
Riddim originated in the early 2010s as a subgenre of dubstep, heavily influenced by Jamaican dancehall music's repetitive instrumental patterns. The term "riddim" was coined around 2012 by dubstep artist Jakes to describe this new, minimalist style, which focused on a single, catchy bassline that repeated throughout the track.

==== Electro house ====
Electro house is a form of house music characterized by a prominent bassline or kick drum and a tempo between 125 and 135 beats per minute, usually 128. Its origins were influenced by electro. The term has been used to describe the music of many DJ Mag Top 100 DJs, including Dimitri Vegas & Like Mike, Hardwell, Skrillex, and Steve Aoki. Italian DJ Benny Benassi, with his track "Satisfaction" released in 2002, is seen as the forerunner of electro-house who brought it to the mainstream. By the mid-2000s, electro-house saw an increase in popularity, with hits such as the Tom Neville remix of Studio B's "I See Girls" in 2005 (UK #11). In November 2006, electroGq-house tracks "Put Your Hands Up for Detroit" by Fedde Le Grand and the D. Ramirez remix of "Yeah Yeah" by Bodyrox and Luciana held the number one and number two spots, respectively, on the UK top 40 singles chart. Since then, electro-house producers such as Feed Me, Knife Party, The M Machine, Porter Robinson, Yasutaka Nakata and Dada Life have emerged.

Big room house is a sub-genre of electro and progressive house that emerged in the mid-2010s, characterized by simplistic melodies and drops, and a sound design intended to be suited towards larger venues such as arenas and outdoor festivals.

==== EDM trap music ====
Trap music originated from techno, dub, and Dutch house, but also from the original off-shoot of Southern hip-hop in the late 2000s and early 2010s. This form of trap music can be simplified by these three features: "1/3 hip hop (tempo and song structure are similar, most tracks are usually between 70 and 110 bpm)—with vocals sometimes being pitched down, 1/3 dance music—high-pitched Dutch synth work, hardstyle sampling, as well as a plethora of trap remixes of popular EDM songs, and 1/3 dub (low-frequency focus and strong emphasis on repetitiveness throughout a song)". Some of the artists that popularized this genre, along with several others, are producers such as RL Grime with the tracks "Core" and "Scylla" released in 2014, Flosstradamus with their Hdynation Radio album released in 2015 and Carnage with his track "Turn Up" released in 2012. Trap music in this connotation was characterized by "soulful synths, 808s, the pan flute, sharp snares and long, syrup-slurred vowels" which created dirty and aggressive beats resulting in "dark melodies". Trap is now mainly used to create remixes of already existing songs.

==== Afro-EDM ====
Afro-EDM depicts African electronic dance music genres and styles that blend elements of traditional African music with electronic dance music. It incorporates various African rhythms, instruments, and vocal styles, merging them with modern EDM production techniques. Afro EDM had existed for decades. However, it was only with the advent of 21st-century technology that African EDM truly began to thrive. Popular contemporary millennium Afro-EDM genres and styles can be found within the gqom (South Africa) and Afrobeats (Nigeria) genres. Music scenes in other African countries exist such as in Uganda and the Democratic Republic of the Congo (tekno kintueni).

==== Afrobeats ====
Pon Pon (also ADM or African Dance Music) emerged in Nigeria circa 2018 denoting EDM influences intermingled with Afrobeats, Nigerian Afropop, dancehall and highlife. A variant is Nigerian Afro-EDM which emerged in the 2020s encompassing afrobeats, Nigerian afro-house and afroelectro.

==== Gqom ====
Gqom originated around 2009–2010 in Durban, through the pioneering efforts of local record producers. Gqom blends elements of techno, broken beats, and house music. Unlike traditional house music, gqom diverges by eschewing the typical four-on-the-floor rhythm. Gqom is categorized as both EDM and house music, characterized by diverse production techniques and variations.

== Terminology ==
In 1980 English producer Richard James Burgess, and his band Landscape, used the term on the sleeve of the single "European Man": "Electronic Dance Music... EDM; computer programmed to perfection for your listening pleasure." In response to a question about being credited with coining the term New Romantic Burgess has stated that: "Initially I was using three terms—Futurist, Electronic Dance Music (the Landscape singles have EDM printed on them) and New Romantic."

Music journalist for The Guardian, Alexis Petridis, claimed that British DJ and music journalist James Hamilton coined the term EDM, but does not give a date for this.

Writing in The Guardian, journalist Simon Reynolds noted that the American music industry's adoption of the term EDM in the late 2000s was an attempt to re-brand US "rave culture" and differentiate it from the 1990s rave scene. It has been described as an era of electronic music, being described in a MixMag article as being "the drop-heavy, stadium-filling, fist-pumping, chart-topping, massively commercial main stage sound that conquered America...possibly somewhere between electro and progressive house, directed by Michael Bay, and like many music genres, trying to pin it down exactly is like trying to grab a fistful of water". In the UK, "dance music" or "dance" are more common terms for EDM.^{[4]} What is widely perceived to be "club music" has changed over time; it now includes different genres and may not always encompass EDM. Similarly, "electronic dance music" can mean different things to different people. Both "club music" and "EDM" seem vague, but the terms are sometimes used to refer to distinct and unrelated genres (club music is defined by what is popular, whereas EDM is distinguished by musical attributes).^{[96]} Though Billboard debuted a "dance" chart in 1974, the larger US music industry did not create music charts until the late 1990s.^{[93]} In July 1995, Nervous Records and Project X Magazine hosted the first awards ceremony, calling it the "Electronic Dance Music Awards".^{[Note 4]}

The City of Chicago defines EDM as "music created by a DJ or multiple DJs primarily using specialized equipment and software instead of traditional instruments."

== Production ==
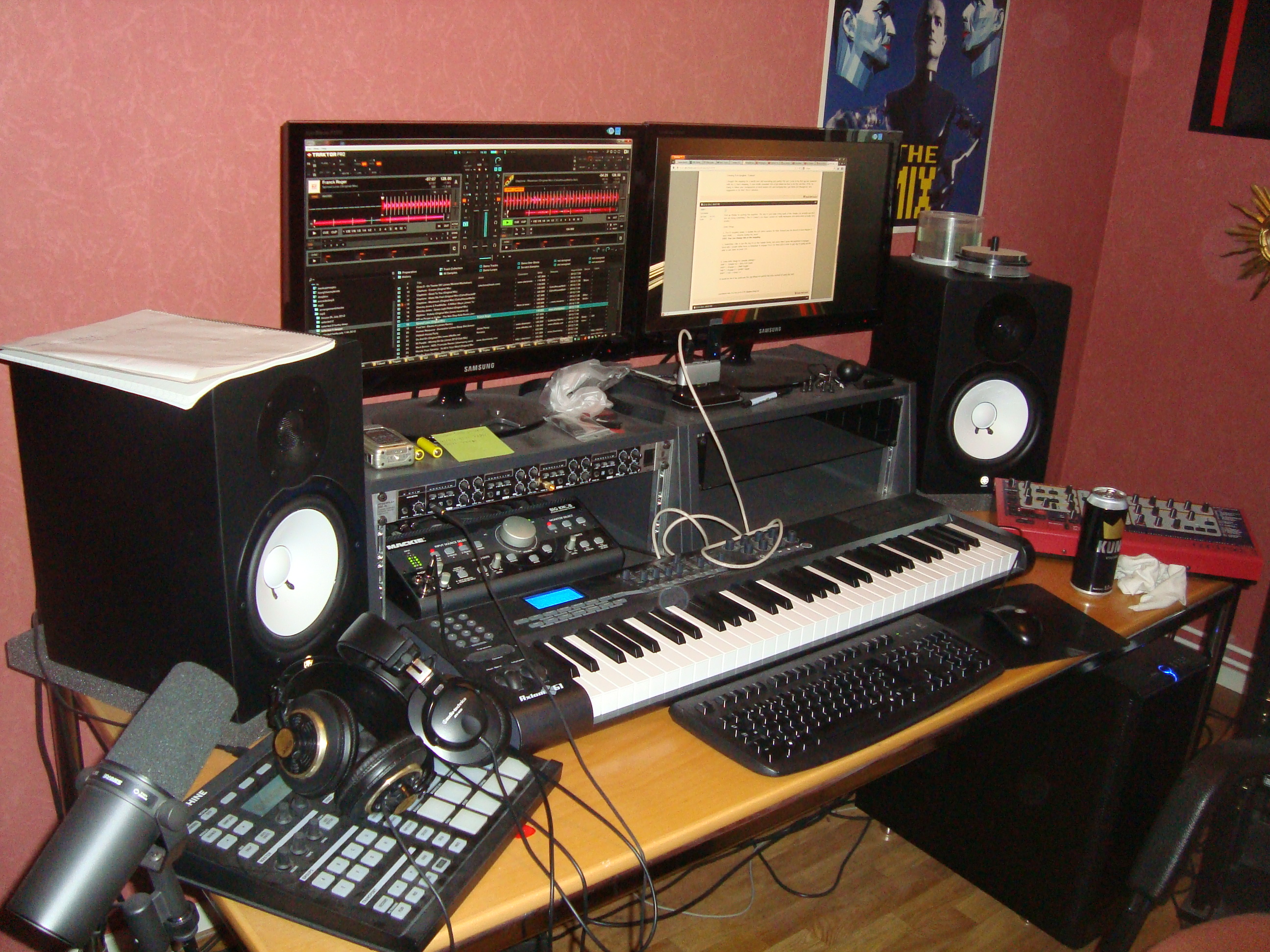
A typical home studio setup for EDM production with computer, audio interface and various MIDI instruments.

Electronic dance music is generally composed and produced in a recording studio with specialized equipment such as samplers, synthesizers, effects units and MIDI controllers all set up to interact with one another using the MIDI protocol. In the genre's early days, hardware electronic musical instruments were used and the focus in production was mainly on manipulating MIDI data as opposed to manipulating audio signals. Since the late 1990s, the use of software has increased. A modern electronic music production studio generally consists of a computer running a digital audio workstation (DAW), with various plug-ins installed such as software synthesizers and effects units, which are controlled with a MIDI controller such as a MIDI keyboard. This setup is generally sufficient to complete entire productions, which are then ready for mastering.

=== Ghost production ===
A ghost producer is a hired music producer in a business arrangement who produces a song for another DJ/artist that releases it as their own, typically under a contract which prevents them from identifying themselves as a personnel of the song. Ghost producers receive a simple fee or royalty payments for their work and are often able to work in their preference of not having the intense pressure of fame and the lifestyle of an internationally recognized DJ. A ghost producer may increase their notability in the music industry by acquainting with established "big name" DJs and producers. Producers like Martin Garrix and Porter Robinson are often noted for their ghost production work for other producers while David Guetta and Steve Aoki are noted for their usage of ghost producers in their songs whereas DJs like Tiësto have been openly crediting their producers in an attempt to avoid censure and for transparency.

Many ghost producers sign agreements that prevent them from working for anyone else or establishing themselves as a solo artist. Such non-disclosure agreements are often noted as predatory because ghost producers, especially teenage producers, do not have an understanding of the music industry. London producer Mat Zo has alleged that DJs who hire ghost producers "have pretended to make their own music and [left] us actual producers to struggle".

=== Bedroom production ===
A bedroom producer is an independent musician who creates electronic music on their laptop or in a home studio. Unlike in traditional recording studios, bedroom producers typically use low-cost, accessible software and equipment which can lead to music being created completely "in the box", with no external hardware.

== Popularisation ==
=== United States ===
Initially, the popularization of electronic dance music was associated with European rave and club culture and it achieved limited popular exposure in the United States. By the mid-to-late 1990s this began to change as the American music industry made efforts to market a range of dance genres as "electronica". At the time, a wave of electronic music bands from the United Kingdom, including The Prodigy, The Chemical Brothers, Fatboy Slim and Underworld, had been prematurely associated with an "American electronica revolution". But rather than finding mainstream success, many established EDM acts were relegated to the margins of the US industry. In 1998, Madonna's album Ray of Light—heavily influenced by club music trends and produced with British producer William Orbit—brought dance music to the attention of popular music listeners. In the late 1990s, despite US media interest in dance music re-branded as electronica, American house and techno producers continued to travel abroad to establish their careers as DJs and producers. By the mid-2000s, Dutch producer Tiësto was bringing worldwide popular attention to EDM after providing a soundtrack to the entry of athletes during the opening ceremony of the 2004 Summer Olympics — an event which The Guardian deemed as one of the 50 most important events in dance music. In 2003, the influence of dance music on American radio resulted in Billboard creating the first-ever Dance/Mix Show Airplay chart. By 2005, the prominence of dance music in North American popular culture had markedly increased. According to Spin, Daft Punk's performance at Coachella in 2006 was the "tipping point" for EDM—it introduced the duo to a new generation of "rock kids". As noted by Entertainment Weekly, Justin Timberlake's "SexyBack" helped introduce EDM sounds to top 40 radio, as it brought together variations of electronic dance music with the singer's R&B sounds. In 2009, French house musician David Guetta began to regularly achieve crossover hits via collaborations with other pop and hip-hop acts, such as Kelly Rowland ("When Love Takes Over"), Akon ("Sexy Bitch"), The Black Eyed Peas ("I Gotta Feeling"), and Sia ("Titanium"). The music sharing website SoundCloud, as well as the video sharing website YouTube, also helped fuel interest in electronic music. Dubstep producer Skrillex popularized a harsher sound dubbed "Brostep", which had drawn comparisons to the aggression and tone of heavy metal.

With the increasing popularity of electronic dance music, promoters and venues realized that DJs could generate larger profits than traditional musicians; Diplo explained that "a band plays [for] 45 minutes; DJs can play for four hours. Rock bands—there's a few headliner dudes that can play 3,000–4,000-capacity venues, but DJs play the same venues, they turn the crowd over two times, people buy drinks all night long at higher prices—it's a win-win." Electronic music festivals, such as Electric Daisy Carnival (EDC) in Las Vegas and Ultra Music Festival in Miami also grew in size, placing an increased emphasis on visual experiences, and DJs who had begun to attain a celebrity status. Other major acts that gained prominence, including Avicii and Swedish House Mafia, toured major venues such as arenas and stadiums rather than playing clubs; in December 2011, Swedish House Mafia became the first electronic music act to sell out New York City's Madison Square Garden.

In 2011, Spin declared a "new rave generation" led by acts like David Guetta, Deadmau5, and Skrillex. In January 2013, Billboard introduced a new EDM-focused Dance/Electronic Songs chart, tracking the top 50 electronic songs based on sales, radio airplay, club play, and online streaming. According to Eventbrite, EDM fans are more likely to use social media to discover and share events or gigs. They also discovered that 78% of fans say they are more likely to attend an event if their peers do, compared to 43% of fans in general. EDM has many young and social fans. By late 2011, Music Trades was describing electronic dance music as the fastest-growing genre in the world. Elements of electronic music also became increasingly prominent in pop music. Radio and television also contributed to dance music's mainstream acceptance.

==== US corporate interest ====
Corporate consolidation in the EDM industry began in 2012—especially in terms of live events. In June 2012, media executive Robert F. X. Sillerman—founder of what is now Live Nation—re-launched SFX Entertainment as an EDM conglomerate, and announced his plan to invest $1 billion to acquire EDM businesses. His acquisitions included regional promoters and festivals (including ID&T, which organises Tomorrowland), two nightclub operators in Miami, and Beatport, an online music store which focuses on electronic music. Live Nation also acquired Cream Holdings and Hard Events, and announced a "creative partnership" with EDC organizers Insomniac Events in 2013 that would allow it to access its resources whilst remaining an independent company; Live Nation CEO Michael Rapino described EDM as the "[new] rock 'n' roll".

US radio conglomerate iHeartMedia, Inc. (formerly Clear Channel Media and Entertainment) also made efforts to align itself with EDM. In January 2014 It hired noted British DJ and BBC Radio 1 personality Pete Tong to produce programming for its "Evolution" dance radio brand, and announced a partnership with SFX to co-produce live concerts and EDM-oriented original programming for its top 40 radio stations. iHeartMedia president John Sykes explained that he wanted his company's properties to be the "best destination [for EDM]".

Major brands have also used the EDM phenomena as a means of targeting millennials and EDM songs and artists have increasingly been featured in television commercials and programs. Avicii's manager Ash Pournouri compared these practices to the commercialization of hip-hop in the early 2000s. Heineken has a marketing relationship with the Ultra Music Festival, and has incorporated Dutch producers Armin van Buuren and Tiësto into its ad campaigns. Anheuser-Busch has a similar relationship as beer sponsor of SFX Entertainment events. In 2014, 7 Up launched "7x7Up"—a multi-platform EDM-based campaign that included digital content, advertising featuring producers, and branded stages at both Ultra and Electric Daisy Carnival. Wireless carrier T-Mobile US entered into an agreement with SFX to become the official wireless sponsor of its events, and partnered with Above & Beyond to sponsor its 2015 tour.

In August 2015, SFX began to experience declines in its value, and a failed bid by CEO Sillerman to take the company private. The company began looking into strategic alternatives that could have resulted in the sale of the company. In October 2015, Forbes declared the possibility of an EDM "bubble", in the wake of the declines at SFX Entertainment, slowing growth in revenue, the increasing costs of organizing festivals and booking talent, as well as an oversaturation of festivals in the eastern and western United States. Insomniac CEO Pasquale Rotella felt that the industry would weather the financial uncertainty of the overall market by focusing on "innovation" and entering into new markets. Despite forecasts that interest in popular EDM would wane, in 2015 it was estimated to be a £5.5bn industry in the US, up by 60% compared to 2012 estimates.

SFX emerged from bankruptcy in December 2016 as LiveStyle, under the leadership of Randy Phillips, a former executive of AEG Live. The company began to slowly divest its live music assets in 2018, including selling its stakes in Rock in Rio (which it had bought as part of an attempted Las Vegas edition of the festival), and later other SFX-owned promoters such as ID&T and React Presents. Phillips stepped down as CEO in 2019 to pursue other projects.

==== Criticism of over-commercialization ====
Following the popularization of EDM in America a number of producers and DJs, including Carl Cox, Steve Lawler, and Markus Schulz, raised concerns that the perceived over-commercialisation of dance music had impacted the art of DJing. Cox saw the "press-play" approach taken by newer EDM DJs as unrepresentative of what he called a "DJ ethos". Writing in Mixmag, DJ Tim Sheridan argued that "push-button DJs" who use auto-sync and play pre-recorded sets of "obvious hits" resulted in a situation overtaken by "the spectacle, money and the showbiz". "Big room house"—an EDM genre characterized by simplistic songs designed to be played in festival settings (exemplified by songs such as Martin Garrix's "Animals"), also faced criticism for being a homogenized sound with little originality. In May 2014, the NBC variety show Saturday Night Live satirized EDM culture and push-button DJs in a Digital Short titled When Will the Bass Drop?. It featured a DJ who goes about performing everyday activities—playing a computer game, frying eggs, collecting money—who then presses a giant "BASS" button, which explodes the heads of concertgoers.

Some house producers openly admitted that "commercial" EDM needed further differentiation and creativity. Avicii, whose 2013 album True featured songs incorporating elements of bluegrass, such as lead single "Wake Me Up", stated that most EDM lacked "longevity". Deadmau5 criticized the homogenization of popular EDM, and suggested that it "all sounds the same". During the 2014 Ultra Music Festival, Deadmau5 made critical comments about up-and-coming producer Martin Garrix, and later played an edited version of Garrix's "Animals" remixed to the melody of "Old McDonald Had a Farm". Afterwards, Tiësto criticized Deadmau5 on Twitter for "sarcastically" mixing Avicii's "Levels" with his own "Ghosts 'n' Stuff" (in reference to being a last-minute substitution for Avicii on the festival schedule due to a medical issue), to which Deadmau5 asked whether playing a song "sarcastically" involved "sneer[ing] while hitting the sync button".

Porter Robinson was another critic of commercial EDM, believing that EDM was oriented towards "entertainment" rather than artistry, and felt that trying to gear songs towards dance and DJs was compromising the quality of his music. In August 2014, he released a studio album titled Worlds, which pivoted from his previous EDM-oriented material in favor of atmospheric tracks with aspects of video game music, new wave, and electropop. His later albums, Nurture and Smile! :D reflected further departures from electronic music, with the former having an indie pop-driven sound, and the latter carrying pop-punk and hyperpop influences.

After years of rapid growth, the American popular EDM market started to wane in 2016, when some producers began to diversify beyond the "big room" sound. This development was directly referenced by two such DJs—David Guetta and Showtek—in a techno-influenced single released in April 2016 titled "The Death of EDM". By the end of the 2010s, EDM's position as the dominant force in mainstream popular music began to plateau as it became displaced by other styles.

=== International ===
In May 2015, the International Music Summit's Business Report estimated that the global electronic music industry had reached nearly $6.9 billion in value; the count included music sales, events revenue (including nightclubs and festivals), the sale of DJ equipment and software, and other sources of revenue. The report also identified several emerging markets for electronic dance music, including East Asia, India, and South Africa, credited primarily to investment by domestic, as well as American and European interests. A number of major festivals also began expanding into Latin America.

In Ghana, West Africa, an artist named Djsky introduced EDM in 2015–present and organised successful festivals and events such as Hey Ibiza, Sunset music Festival, Sky show and more. In an interview with WatsUp TV, Djsky revealed he was the first to introduce Electronic Music Dance into Ghana music.

In Ethiopia EDM has become part of mainstream music after the 2018 breakthrough of a young artist named Rophnan which incorporated EDM sound with traditional rhythms and melodies. In his shows, tens of thousands of youth were packing stadiums across the country and radios started to play the emerging genre.

China is a market where EDM had initially made relatively few inroads; although promoters believed that the mostly instrumental music would remove a metaphorical language barrier, the growth of EDM in China was hampered by the lack of a prominent rave culture in the country as in other regions, as well as the popularity of domestic Chinese pop over foreign artists. Former Universal Music executive Eric Zho, inspired by the US growth, made the first significant investments in electronic music in China, including the organisation of Shanghai's inaugural Storm festival in 2013, the reaching of a title sponsorship deal for the festival with Anheuser-Busch's Budweiser brand, a local talent search, and organising collaborations between EDM producers and Chinese singers, such as Avicii and Wang Leehom's "Lose Myself". In the years following, a larger number of EDM events began to appear in China, and Storm itself was also preceded by a larger number of pre-parties in 2014 than its inaugural year. A new report released during the inaugural International Music Summit China in October 2015 revealed that the Chinese EDM industry was experiencing modest gains, citing the larger number of events (including new major festival brands such as Modern Sky and YinYang), a 6% increase in the sales of electronic music in the country, and the significant size of the overall market. Zho also believed that the country's "hands-on" political climate, as well as investments by China into cultural events, helped in "encouraging" the growth of EDM in the country.

== Social impact ==
=== Festivals ===
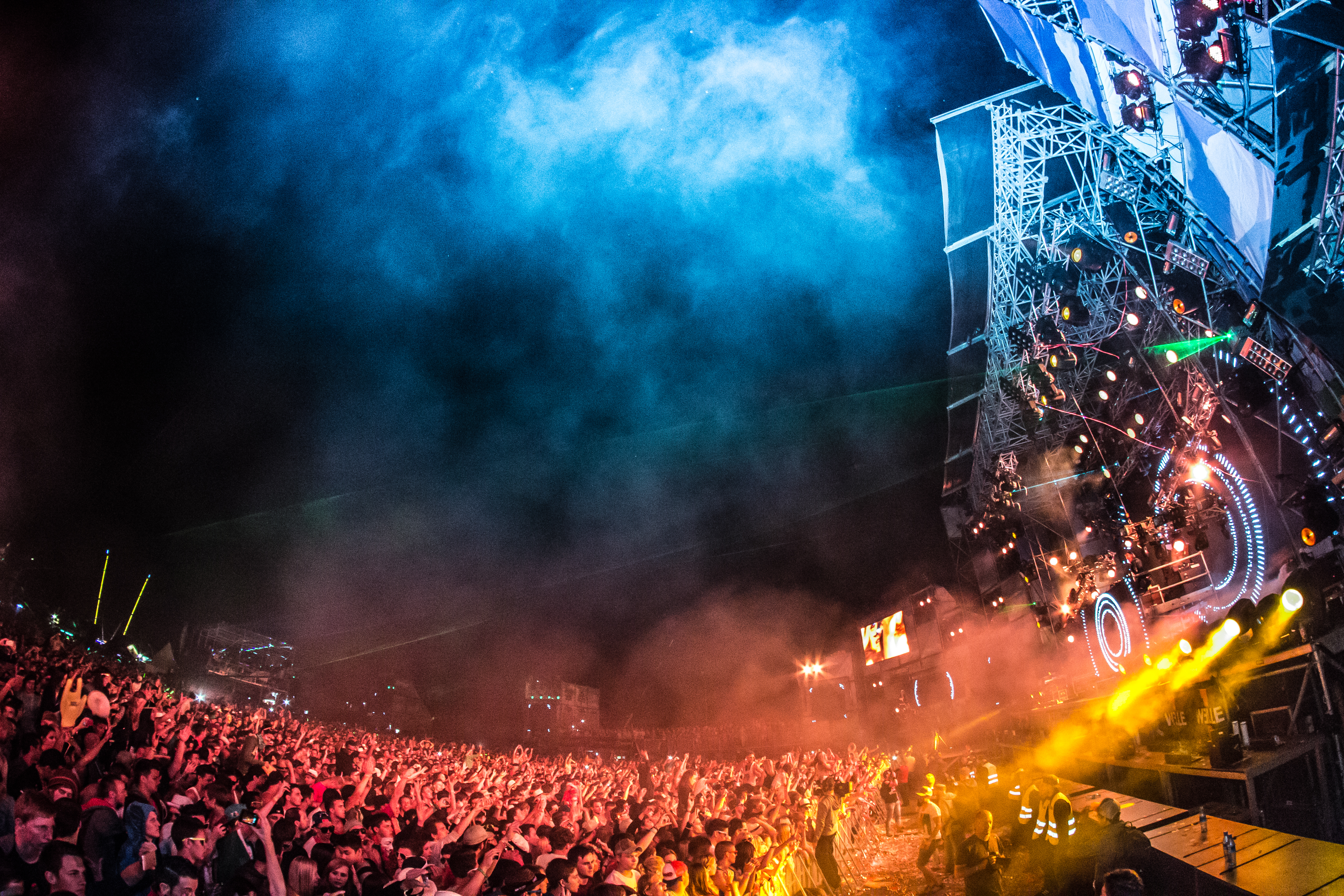
An EDM festival in 2013 in Plainfeld, Austria, with over 100,000 attendees, exhibiting the large crowds and dramatic lighting common at such events since the early 2000s

In the 1980s, electronic dance music was often played at illegal underground rave parties held in secret locations, for example, warehouses, abandoned aircraft hangars, fields and any other large, open areas. In the 1990s and 2000s, aspects of the underground rave culture of the 1980s and early 1990s began to evolve into legitimate, organized EDM concerts and festivals. Major festivals often feature a large number of acts representing various EDM genres spread across multiple stages. Festivals have placed a larger emphasis on visual spectacles as part of their overall experiences, including elaborate stage designs with underlying thematics, complex lighting systems, laser shows, and pyrotechnics. Rave fashion also evolved among attendees, which The Guardian described as having progressed from the 1990s "kandi raver" to "[a] slick and sexified yet also kitschy-surreal image midway between Venice Beach and Cirque du Soleil, Willy Wonka and a gay pride parade". These events differed from underground raves by their organized nature, often taking place at major venues, and with measures to ensure the health and safety of attendees. MTV's Rawley Bornstein described electronic music as "the new rock and roll", as has Lollapalooza organizer Perry Farrell.

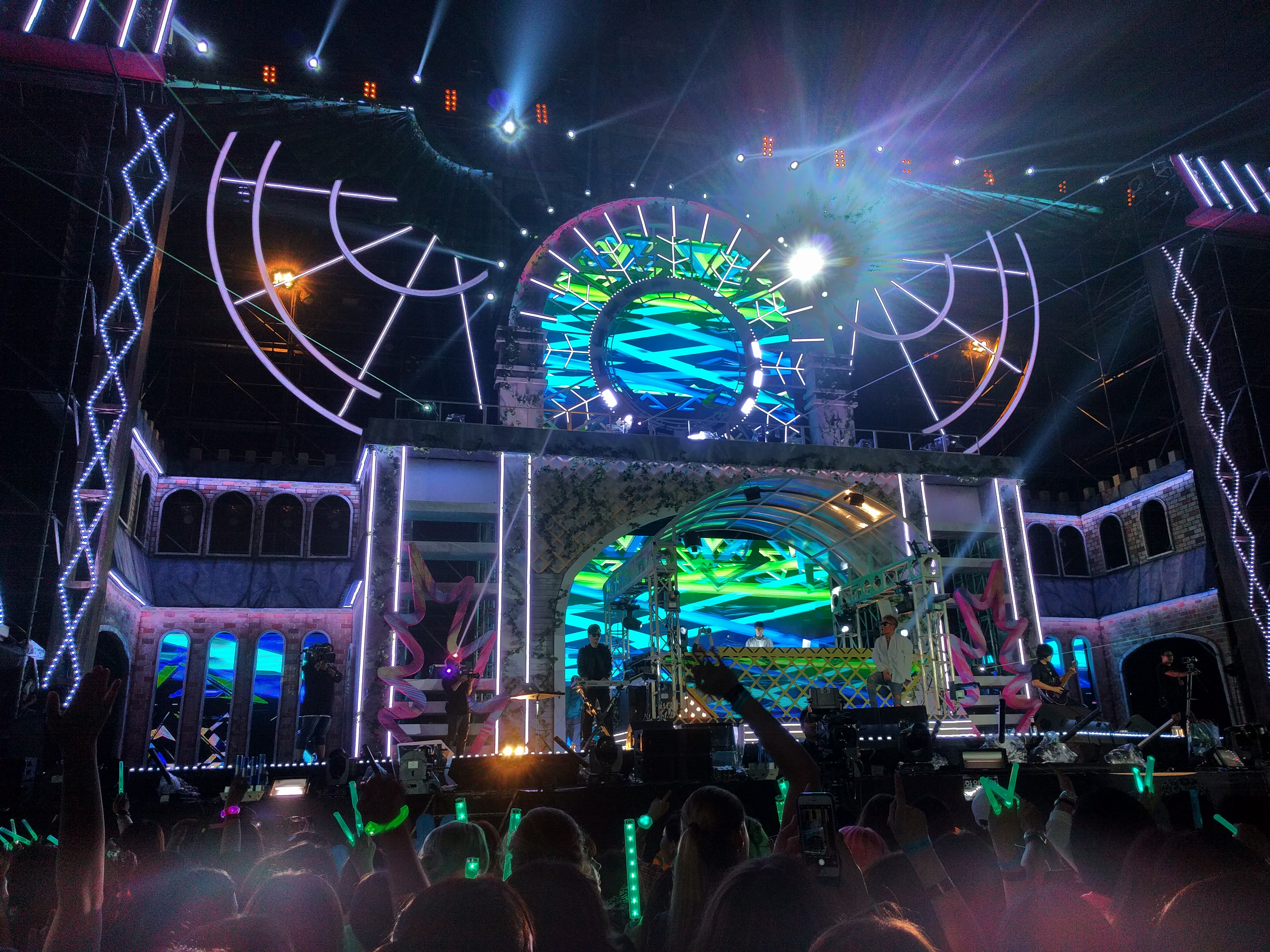
Spectrum Dance Music Festival, 2016

Ray Waddell of Billboard noted that festival promoters have done an excellent job at branding. Larger festivals have been shown to have positive economic impacts on their host cities the 2014 Ultra Music Festival brought 165,000 attendees—and over $223 million—to the Miami/South Florida region's economy. The inaugural edition of TomorrowWorld—a U.S.-based version of Belgium's Tomorrowland festival, brought $85.1 million to the Atlanta area—as much revenue as its hosting of the NCAA Final Four (the semi-final and national championship games of the NCAA Division I men's basketball tournament) earlier in the year. EDC Las Vegas boosted the Clark County economy by $350.3 million in 2015 alone, with over 405,000 attendees across three days (June 19–21).

The popularity of EDM and festivals also led some multi-genre festivals not strongly associated with electronic music, such as Coachella and Lollapalooza, to add more electronic acts to their lineup. They often play EDM-specific stages, but major acts such as Deadmau5, Calvin Harris and Subtronics have made overall headlining appearances on the main stages of Lollapalooza and Coachella respectively—placements that are typically associated with rock and alternative acts. Russell Smith of The Globe and Mail felt that the commercial festival industry was an antithesis to the original principles of the rave subculture, citing "the expensive tickets, the giant corporate sponsors, the crass bro culture—shirtless muscle boys who cruise the stadiums, tiny popular girls in bikinis who ride on their shoulders—not to mention the sappy music itself." Drug-related incidents, as well as other complaints surrounding the behaviour of their attendees, have contributed to negative perceptions and opposition to electronic music events by local authorities.

After Ultra Music Festival 2014, where a crowd of gatecrashers trampled a security guard on its first day, members of the Miami City Commission considered banning the festival from being held in the city, citing the trampling incident, lewd behavior, and complaints by downtown residents of being harassed by attendees. The commissioners voted to allow Ultra to continue being held in Miami due to its positive economic effects, under the condition that its organizers address security, drug usage and lewd behavior by attendees. In 2018, after continued concerns, the commissioners voted to bar the festival from being held in Bayfront Park and downtown Miami, but subsequently approved a proposal to move the event to one of Miami's barrier islands, Virginia Key. Following the festival, which was impacted by transportation issues (as there is only one vehicular link between Virginia Key and mainland Miami) and other problems, Ultra pulled out of the agreement, and negotiated an agreement to return to Bayfront Park. The UK Jungle and Drum and Bass focused record label, Hospital Records, runs a festival called Hospitality in clubs and other locations scattered around the UK and other countries with big EDM influence. These events are usually concerts from artists on the record's roster of musicians.

=== COVID-19 impact ===
Due to the COVID-19 pandemic, cancellation of festivals, accompanied by the restrictions on social distancing has negatively impacted economic activity of festivals and the music industry. Festivals are required to have regulations on health and safety, as well as deal with crisis and risk management, since they are at high risk due to the mass of people that attend. As a result, it has become normal for festivals or performances to be streamed online.

During 2020, all large EDM music festivals were postponed or canceled due to the COVID-19 pandemic. On March 4, 2020, Ultra Miami was the first electronic dance music festival to cancel an event since the event could not conform to the state's capacity rules and county's safety protocols and regulations. On April 21, 2020, Electric Forest music festival in Rothbury, Michigan rescheduled their event on June 25–27, 2020 to June 2021 due to health concerns. On July 9, 2020, New York City Mayor Bill de Blasio decided that all sizeable events will be suspended through September 30. As a result, Electric Zoo 2020, which takes place on Randall's Island in New York City during Labor Day Weekend, fully canceled their 2020 event.

Electric Daisy Carnival Las Vegas (EDC), the biggest dance music festival in North America, was scheduled to happen on May 15–17, 2020. In April, EDC postponed their May event to October 2–4, 2020, and later declared on August 2 that EDC Las Vegas 2020 would be officially canceled. Instead, EDC CEO Pasquale Rotella announced the celebration of EDC's 25th anniversary on May 21–23, 2021. On April 9, 2021, EDC had not yet released their lineup and COVID-19 safety protocols for the event happening in May 2021. On April 20, 2021, Rotella postponed the festival to October 22–24, 2021.

The cancellations of these events economically hurt the music industry and the companies that run these events. EDC 2020 originally sold out of the 200,000 tickets for their first event, but offered full returns for those who could not make it to new dates. Electric Zoo included an incentive for customers to keep their ticket by providing an extra $50 for General Admission tickets and $100 for VIP tickets to spend on merchandise and food on festival grounds. Most music festival companies offered to rollover the ticket to their next event or give full refunds to those who could not attend, but ultimately lost a lot of customers due to the uncertainty of COVID-19.

=== Association with recreational drug use ===
Dance music has a long association with recreational drug use, particularly with a wide range of drugs that have been categorized under the name "club drugs". Russell Smith noted that the association of drugs and music subcultures was by no means exclusive to electronic music, citing previous examples of music genres that were associated with certain drugs, such as psychedelic rock and LSD, disco music and cocaine, and punk rock and heroin.

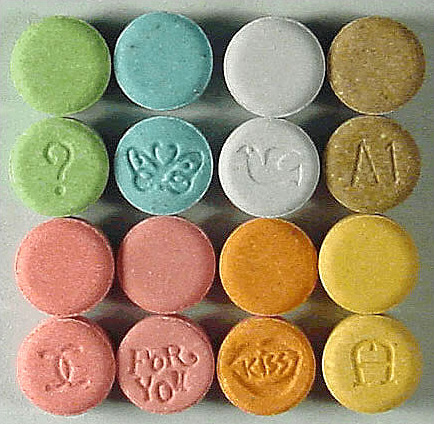
Pictured above is what the drug ecstasy commonly looks like, though there are many different shapes and forms

Methylenedioxymethamphetamine (MDMA), also known as ecstasy, "E", or "Molly", is often considered the drug of choice within the rave culture and is also used at clubs, festivals and house parties. In the rave environment, the sensory effects from the music and lighting are often highly synergistic with the drug. The psychedelic amphetamine quality of MDMA offers multiple reasons for its appeals to users in the "rave" setting. Some users enjoy the feeling of mass communion from the inhibition-reducing effects of the drug, while others use it as party fuel because of the drug's stimulatory effects. Another drug para-Methoxyamphetamine (4-MA) also known as pink ecstasy, PMA, "Death" or "Dr. Death", it is similar to MDMA but they can take up to an hour to produce effects, which can result in hyperthermia and subsequently, organ failure. People who take PMA are often mistaken for it being identified as MDMA.

MDMA is occasionally known for being taken in conjunction with psychedelic drugs. The more common combinations include MDMA combined with LSD, MDMA combined with DMT, MDMA with psilocybin mushrooms, and MDMA with the dissociative drug ketamine. Many users use mentholated products while taking MDMA for its cooling sensation while experiencing the drug's effects. Examples include menthol cigarettes, Vicks VapoRub, NyQuil, and lozenges.

The incidence of nonmedical ketamine has increased in the context of raves and other parties. However, its emergence as a club drug differs from other club drugs (e.g. MDMA) due to its anesthetic properties (e.g., slurred speech, immobilization) at higher doses; in addition, there are reports of ketamine being sold as "ecstasy". The use of ketamine as part of a "postclubbing experience" has also been documented. Ketamine's rise in the dance culture was rapid in Hong Kong by the end of the 1990s. Before becoming a federally controlled substance in the United States in 1999, ketamine was available as diverted pharmaceutical preparations and as a pure powder sold in bulk quantities from domestic chemical supply companies. Much of the current ketamine diverted for nonmedical use originates in China and India.

==== Drug-related deaths at electronic dance music events ====
A number of deaths attributed to apparent drug use have occurred at major electronic music concerts and festivals. The Los Angeles Memorial Coliseum blacklisted Insomniac Events after an underaged attendee died from "complications of ischemic encephalopathy due to methylenedioxymethamphetamine intoxication" during Electric Daisy Carnival 2010; as a result, the event was re-located to Las Vegas the following year. Drug-related deaths during Electric Zoo 2013 in New York City, United States, and Future Music Festival Asia 2014 in Kuala Lumpur, Malaysia, prompted the final day of both events to be cancelled, while Life in Color cancelled a planned event in Malaysia out of concern for the incident, and other drug-related deaths that occurred at the A State of Trance 650 concerts in Jakarta, Indonesia.

In September 2016, the city of Buenos Aires, Argentina, banned all electronic music events, pending future legislation, after five drug-related deaths and four injuries at a Time Warp Festival event in the city in April 2016. The ban forced electronic band Kraftwerk to cancel a planned concert in the city, despite arguing that there were dissimilarities between a festival and their concerts.

== Industry awards ==
Organization	Award(s)	Year(s)	Notes
BRIT Awards	British Dance Act	1994–present (on hiatus from 2005 to 2021)	Most recently won (2026) by Fred Again, Skepta and PlaqueBoyMax.
EDMAs	Male Artist of the Year	2016–present	Most recently won (2026) by John Summit.
EDMAs	Female Artist of the Year	2016–present	Most recently won (2026) by Alison Wonderland.
EDMAs	Vocalist of the Year	2016–present	Most recently won (2026) by Zara Larsson.
Grammy Awards	Best Dance/Electronic Recording	1998–present	Most recently won (2025) by Tame Impala for "End of Summer".
Grammy Awards	Best Dance/Electronic Music Album	2005–present	Most recently won (2025) by FKA Twigs for "Eusexua".
DJ Mag	Top 100 DJs poll	1991–present	The British dance music magazine DJ Mag publishes a yearly listing of the top 100 DJs in the world; from 1991 to 1996 the Top 100 poll were ranked by the magazine's journalists; in 1997 the poll became a public vote. The current number one as of the 2025 list is David Guetta.
DJ Awards	Best DJ Award	1998–present	The only global DJ awards event that nominates and awards international DJs in 11 categories held annually in Ibiza, Spain, winners selected by a public vote and one of the most important.
Winter Music Conference (WMC)	IDMA: International Dance Music Awards	1998–present	
Project X Magazine	Electronic Dance Music Awards	1995	Readers of Project X magazine voted for the winners of the first (and only) "Electronic Dance Music Awards". In a ceremony organized by the magazine and Nervous Records, award statues were given to Winx, The Future Sound of London, Moby, Junior Vasquez, Danny Tenaglia, DJ Keoki, TRIBAL America Records and Moonshine Records.
American Music Awards	Favorite Dance/Electronic Artist	2012–present	Most recently won (2025) by Lady Gaga.
World Music Awards	Favorite Electronic Dance Music Artist	2006–present (on hiatus)	Most recently won (2014) by Calvin Harris.

== See also ==
(Alphabetical)

- Alternative dance
- Beatport
- Computational musicology
- Dance music
- Drop
- EBM
- Freetekno
- Gospel music
- Latin freestyle
- List of electronic dance music venues
- List of electronic music genres
- Rave music
- Remix
- Rock music
- Sampling
- Timeline of electronic music genres
- Soul music
