= Randy Phillips (music producer) =

American music producer

- Born: 1954 or 1955 (age 71–72)
- Education: B.A. Stanford University
- Occupations: Music Producer; Talent agent Booking agent
- Known for: President and CEO of LiveStyle; Former president of Anschutz Entertainment Group

Randy Phillips is an American music producer, former president of Anschutz Entertainment Group, and current president and CEO of LiveStyle (formerly SFX Entertainment).

== Biography ==
Phillips was born to a Jewish family and graduated from Stanford University where he was the director of special events and was named Billboard's college talent buyer of the year. At Stanford, he was responsible for all bookings including Crosby Stills & Nash, Boz Scaggs, Fleetwood Mac, and Rod Stewart. After graduating, he went to the Santa Clara University School of Law where he received a scholarship thanks to his booking prowess (Santa Clara had a 5,000-seat stadium at the time). He served as their stadium manager and was responsible for booking bands such as Lydia Pense, Cold Blood, Elvin Bishop, and Bruce Springsteen. After law school, he worked for NBC where he co-produced Rock Palace. He then signed a contract with K-Rock where he focused on New Wave artists, Haircut 100 and Modern English; and later booked Rod Stewart. Soon after, Stewart's manager, Arnold Stiefel, hired him to join his talent management company and Phillips quickly signed Billy Squier and Prince becoming a full partner after the first year. Phillips and Paul Gongaware managed Prince until Warner Brothers executives Mo Ostin, Lenny Waronker, and Michael Ostin parted ways with Prince. While with Stiefel, he also signed Simple Minds, Morrissey from The Smiths, Matthew Broderick, and produced the film Midnight in the Garden of Good and Evil.

In the late 1980s, he contracted with Al Teller, the chairman of MCA (now Universal Music Group), to obtain acts for his newly-created record label called Gasoline Alley. He quickly signed Shai and later Sublime (an act his nephew found although he and his nephew kept the first two of Sublime's albums, 40oz to Freedom and Robbin the Hood, to themselves forming the independent label Skunk Records). He signed Toni Braxton and reached success with Un-Break My Heart a song Clive Davis brought to them from Diane Warren that they co-produced with David Foster. In 1994, he founded Red Ant Records with Al Teller - who had left MCA - and signed contracts with Divine (which had the 1998 hit single Lately), Cheap Trick, and Salt-N-Pepa. In 1999, Irving Azoff engaged him to help book acts at the boutique concert company Concerts West (founded by Paul Gongaware and John Meglen) which had just been sold to the Anschutz Entertainment Group. As Phillips was close friends to David Zedeck and Larry Rudolph, he was able to book Britney Spears, Tom Petty, and Paul McCartney. Soon after, he became the CEO of Concerts West changing the name to AEG Live and reporting directly to CEO Tim Leiweke. While CEO, he hired Clear Channel executives Chuck Morris and Brent Fedrizzi; brokered the purchase of rival Goldenvoice; purchased 50% of Coachella; expanded into New York by taking over the staff (including Debra Rathwell) of Mitch Slater's Metropolitan Entertainment after it was purchased by Live Nation; and opened The O2 Arena in London hiring Rob Hallett as booking agent (opening with Bon Jovi, Justin Timberlake, and Bocelli). Along with Quint Davis and George Wein, Phillips successfully promoted the New Orleans Jazz & Heritage Festival and along with John Meglen was able to book Celine Dion to open the Colosseum at Caesars and then 50 nights with Michael Jackson thanks to company founder Philip Anschutz's friendship with Tom Barrack. After Jackson's death, he produced the memorial broadcast with Ken Ehrlich and Kenny Ortega.

In 2013, went to work for Ashley Tabor-founded, radio operator Global Entertainment. In 2016, he was asked by Andrew Axelrod at Axar Capital and German insurer Allianz to run Robert F. X. Sillerman-founded concert promoter SFX Entertainment which they had purchased out of bankruptcy. Phillips hired Chuck Ciongoli and Gary Richards, renamed the company LiveStyle, and moved the headquarters to Los Angeles. Phillips felt that SFX as a brand had garnered a negative reputation, and that the company had originally collapsed because it focused too much on growing quickly, performing an IPO, and Sillerman "[selling] a story about sponsorship", which "has to be the icing on the cake – not the cake itself." Phillips also began to describe the company as being oriented towards electronic music in general rather than EDM, and stated that some of their events (such as Mysteryland) will broaden their scope (similarly to the Coachella Festival, which is owned by his former employer), but other events will remain predominantly oriented towards electronic music.
