= MDVIP =

Concierge MD network

- Type: Privately held company
- Industry: Health care
- Founded: 2000; 26 years ago
- Headquarters: Boca Raton, Florida, United States
- Area served: 45 states and the District of Columbia
- Services: Primary-care medicine
- Parent: Goldman Sachs Asset Management and Charlesbank Capital Partners
- Website: mdvip.com

MDVIP is an American company, headquartered in Boca Raton, Florida, that operates a network of concierge physicians (see concierge medicine). The company's physicians practice preventive medicine and personalized primary-care medicine.

The national network consists of 1,300 physicians serving over 400,000 patients in 45 states and the District of Columbia. Each physician cares for up to 600 patients as opposed to the average 2,500-3,500 patients in a traditional primary-care practice. MDVIP patients receive a comprehensive physical examination and follow-up wellness plan as well as electronic medical records and a personalized patient portal with focus on diet, exercise, doctor communication and more. The company states that additional patient benefits include acute-care visits, same or next-day availability, on-time appointments, 24/7 physician availability, and enhanced coordination of specialty care.

== History ==
Founded in Boca Raton in 2000. In June 2014, growth-equity investor Summit Partners acquired the company from Procter & Gamble. In November 2017, Leonard Green & Partners acquired majority ownership. In October 2021, Goldman Sachs Asset Management's Private Equity group and Charlesbank Capital Partners completed the acquisition of MDVIP from Leonard Green & Partners and Summit Partners.

== Business model ==
To supplement insurance reimbursements, MDVIP physicians charge patients an annual fee between $2,500 and $5,000 per year. In addition to this annual fee, patients are responsible for applicable co-pays and co-insurance, and maintain primary-care insurance coverage including Medicare.

MDVIP physicians are not directly employed by the company, instead they pay a royalty or franchise fee of 1/3rd of the membership fee per patient per year for services such as patient conversion, marketing, branding and other support.

== See also ==
- List of Florida companies
