= Avant Gardner =

Nightclub, music venue in New York City

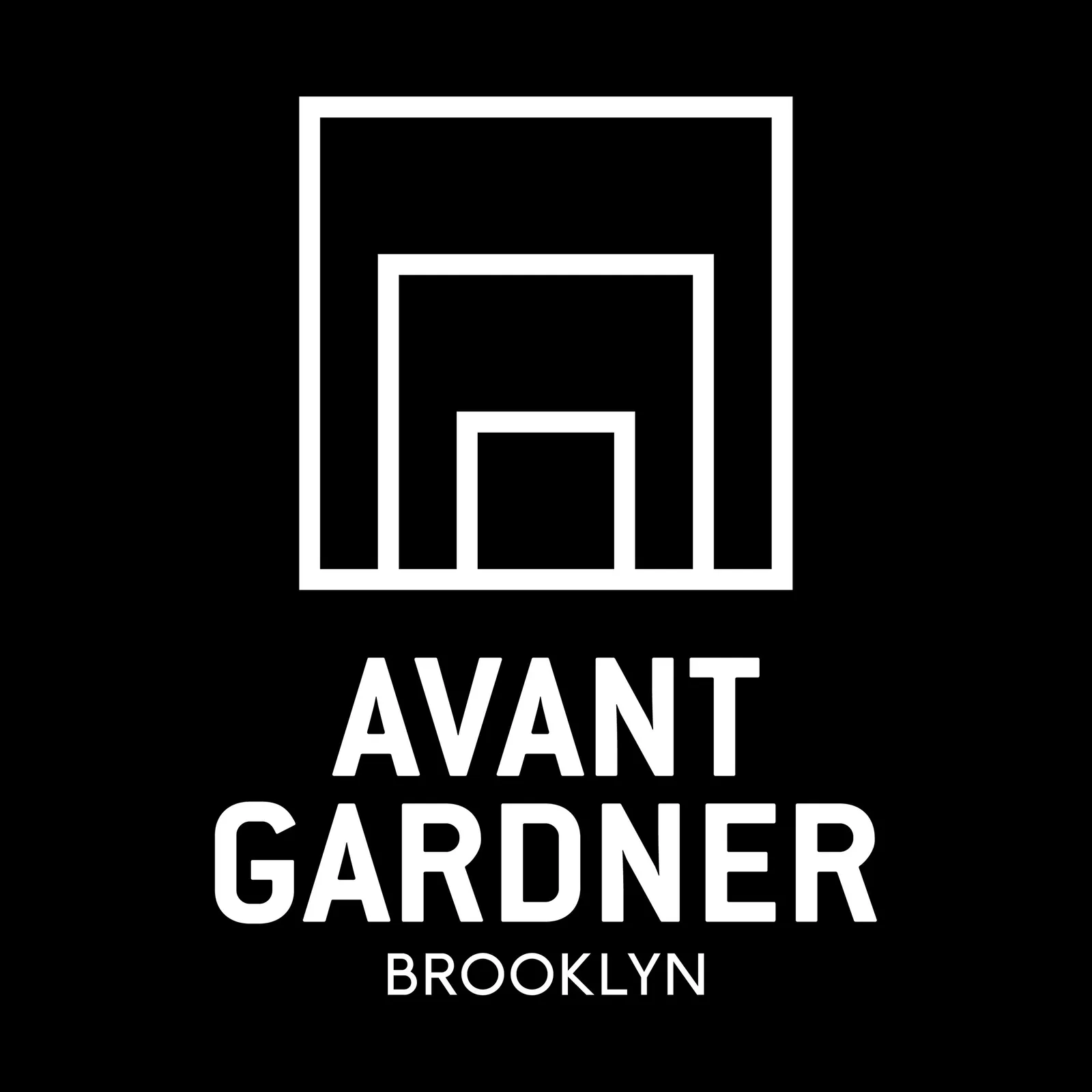

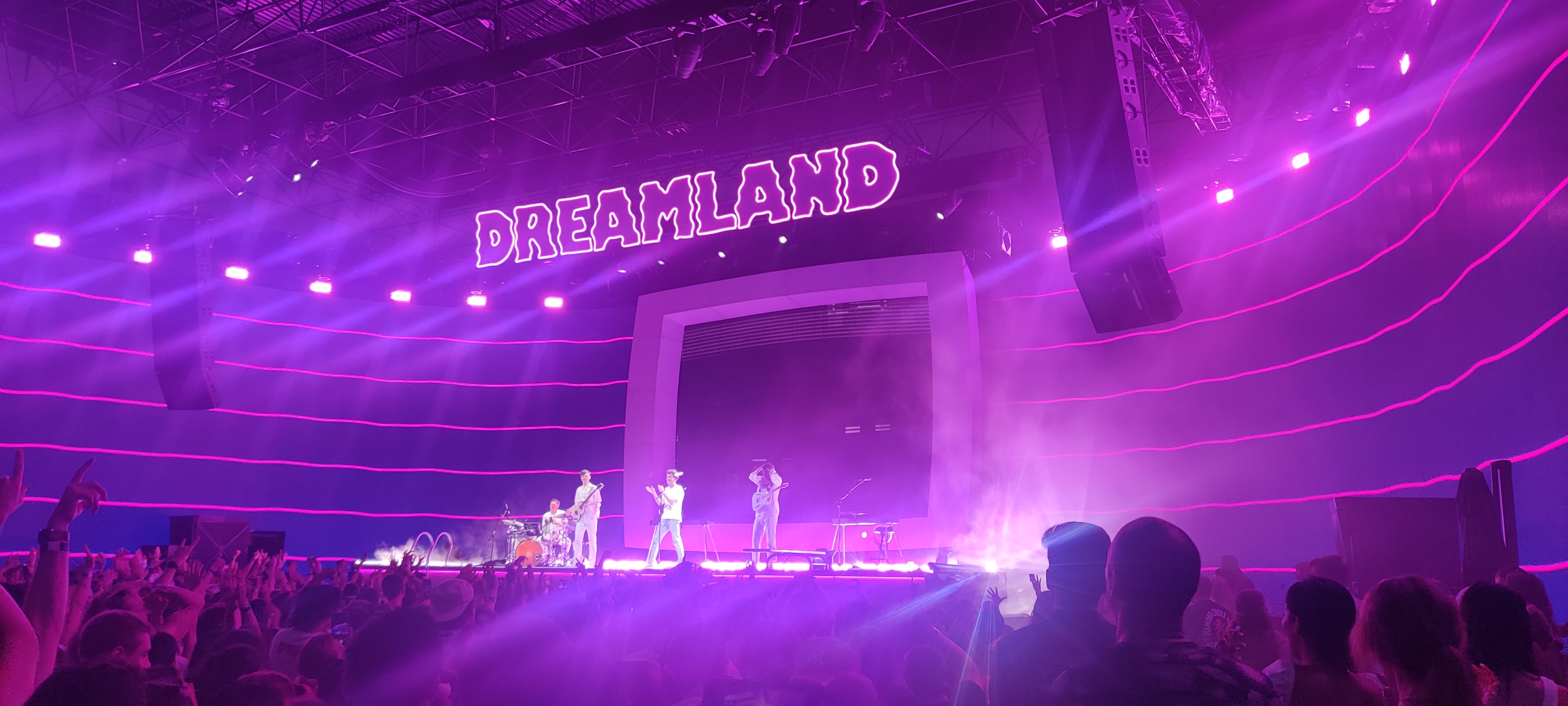
- Glass Animals performing at the Brooklyn Mirage in 2022
- Alternative names: Brooklyn Mirage, The Great Hall, Kings Hall

General information
- Location: 140 Stewart Ave; Brooklyn, New York, 11237, United States
- Coordinates: 40.71042251586914°N 73.926476°W
- Opened: 2017

Technical details
- Floor count: 4

Website
- https://www.avant-gardner.com

Avant Gardner was a New York City nightclub and music venue complex located in East Williamsburg, Brooklyn. The property, which spanned two whole city blocks, comprised three distinct event spaces: The Great Hall, Kings Hall, and its seasonal outdoor venue The Brooklyn Mirage.

Initially conceived in 2015 by Swiss-based promoter Cityfox as a pop-up nightclub at the nearby 99 Scott Avenue, the Brooklyn Mirage was established as a permanent space at its current street address by 2017. Following a 2022 refurbishment that included the installation of one of the highest-resolution video walls in the world, the venue became renowned for its production capabilities and unique outdoor atmosphere.

The two indoor rooms are characterized by an urban-industrial aesthetic. The Great Hall was previously a steel fabrication plant that now has a capacity of 2,776 people and hosts a variety of programming including corporate events and private functions. Conversely, Kings Hall, with its 480 person capacity and glass skylight, is considered more intimate in nature.

Following a chaotic series of renovations and closures, Avant Gardner filed for Chapter 11 bankruptcy on August 4, 2025.

== Controversies ==
Since its inception, Avant Gardner has been the subject of numerous controversies including general negligence, oversold events, aggressive security personnel, and accusations of political corruption. Electric Zoo, an annual EDM festival on Randalls Island, was acquired by the company in 2022 and was the subject of lawsuits after the 2023 edition was plagued by cancellations and a stampede of concertgoers that broke through its gates on the third and final day. The NYPD alleged Avant Gardner oversold the event by 7,000 tickets.

Further, complaints have been made regarding rude treatment at the hands of security at checkpoints, $15–$30 locker charges for purses and small bags.

=== 2025 renovations, delays, and demolition ===
When Josh Wyatt was hired as the complex's first CEO in 2024, the complex had launched a PR campaign in which he repeatedly touted a major venue redesign. According to specifics of the new Mirage released by the company, the new setting would include a shutter system with a 30K resolution, and over 100 precision-calibrated speakers and subwoofers. Originally, the venue planned to hold its first show of the year on May 1.

The Brooklyn Mirage cancelled its annual opening weekend; it was later revealed that despite official communications from the complex and in an April 30 interview with Wyatt conducted by Brooklyn Magazine that the venue was "show-ready", New York City's Department of Buildings had not granted them the necessary permits. The outdoor space remains closed, with no known opening date, canceling numerous shows up to and including the 2025 Memorial Day weekend. By May 22, Wyatt was fired as CEO of Avant Gardner, with day-to-day duties shifting to Gary Richards, Avant Gardner's non-executive chairman.

On August 4, Avant Gardner filed for bankruptcy, citing liabilities of up to $500 million, while holding less than $100 million in assets. That October, the company filed a permit application to demolish 32,000 square feet of the venue. The demolition of the Brooklyn Mirage was approved in January 2026, with work to begin the next month. The club Pacha built a new venue at the site, which opened in June 2026.

== Accolades ==
The entire complex has been ranked by DJ Mag as the 17th best nightclub in the world in 2025, and as the 10th best by the International Nightlife Association.
