= Electric Zoo =

Electronic music festival in Randall's Island, New York City

Electric Zoo Festival
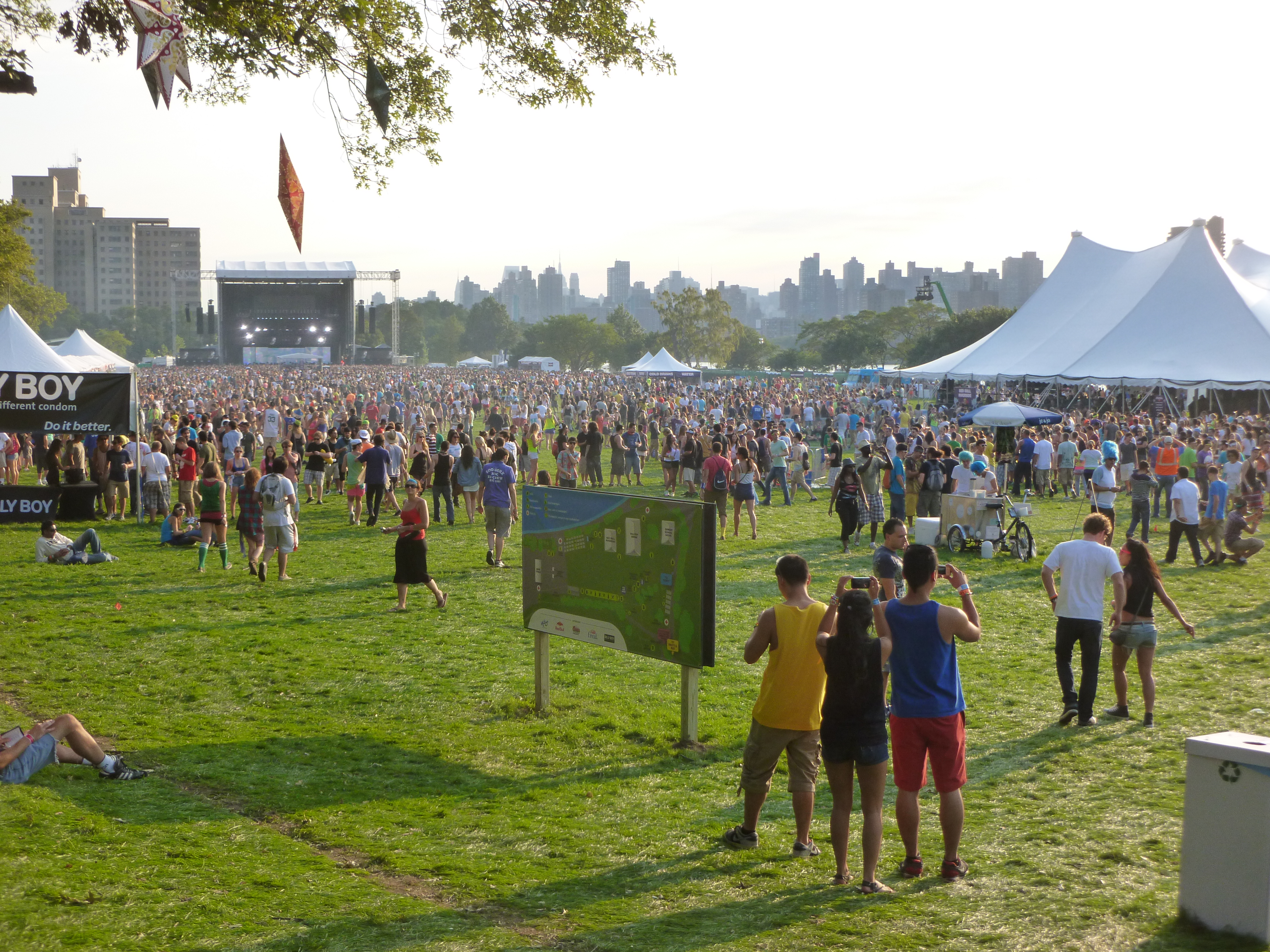
- Electric Zoo Festival
- Status: Active
- Genre: Music festival
- Frequency: Annually, Labor Day Weekend
- Venue: Randall's Island Park NYC
- Locations: New York City, U.S. Cancún, Mexico; São Paulo, Brazil; Tokyo, Japan; Beijing, China
- Country: United States; Mexico; Brazil; Japan; China
- Years active: 17
- Inaugurated: September 5, 2009
- Founder: Made Event
- Most recent: September 2–4, 2022
- Previous event: September 1–3, 2023
- Next event: -
- Website: www.electriczoofestival.com

Electric Zoo was an annual electronic music festival held over Labor Day weekend in New York City on Randall's Island. The festival represents all genres of electronic music, bringing top international DJs and live acts from multiple countries to four stages.

In its 2009 inaugural year, 26,000 people attended to see artists Armin van Buuren, Deadmau5, David Guetta and Ferry Corsten. In 2011, Electric Zoo expanded to a 3-day festival and with 85,000 attendees. Electric Zoo received International Dance Music Awards nominations in 2010, 2011, 2012, and 2013 for "Best Music Event".

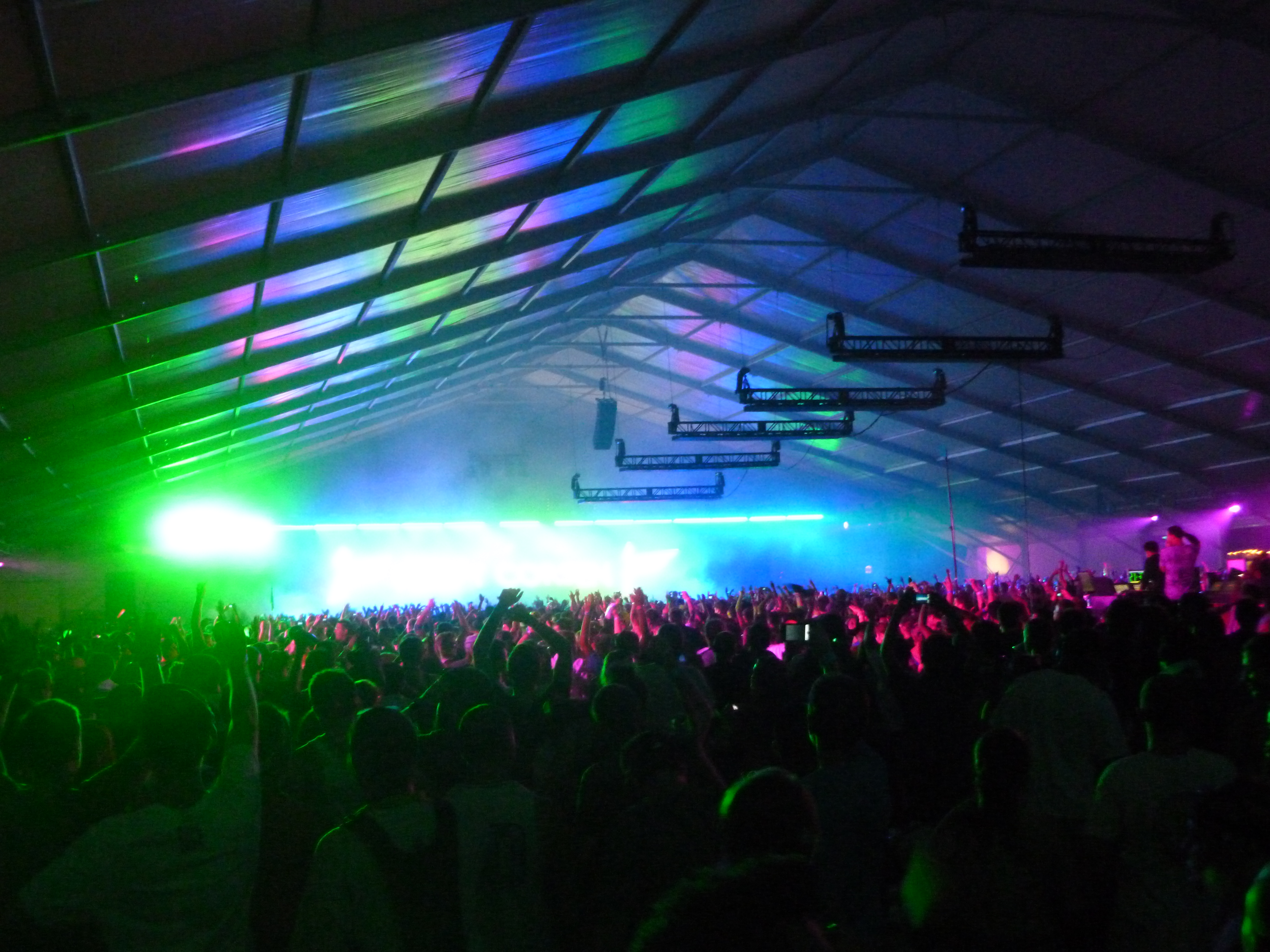
Hilltop Arena

== History ==
=== Electric Zoo 2009 ===
Electric Zoo 2009 was held during Labor Day weekend on September 5, 6, 2009. It featured 55 artists over the course of the 2 days the event spanned.

=== Electric Zoo 2010 ===
Electric Zoo 2010 was held on Labor Day weekend on September 4, 5, 2010. There were 66 acts during the 2 day festival.

=== Electric Zoo 2011 ===
Electric Zoo added one more day to the event from previous years, leading to the event being 3 days (Friday/Saturday/Sunday) instead of 2, which led to the performances of over 100 artists (expanding from the 66 of the previous year). The dates of the event were September 2, 3, 4, 2011. The overall attendance for all three days was 85,000.

=== Electric Zoo 2012 ===
Electric Zoo 2012 was the largest festival yet as over 110,000 people attended over the three days (8/31/12 - 9/2/12) with sold out crowds on Saturday and Sunday. The event was headlined by Above & Beyond, Pretty Lights, David Guetta, Laidback Luke, Dada Life, Tiësto, Porter Robinson and Skrillex. Made Event offered free water refill stations, designated help points and employed security staff.

=== Electric Zoo 2013 ===
==== Deaths and cancellation ====
The final day of Electric Zoo 2013 on September 1, 2013 was cancelled after two attendees, Jeffery Russ and Olivia Rotondo, died from hyperthermia and an overdose of MDMA during the festival, and four others had fallen ill. The organizers of the event and a number of performers provided their condolences to the victims. In response to concerns that the incident could affect future music events in the city, Mayor Michael Bloomberg's press secretary Marc LaVorgna stated that while the city would investigate the incident, live music events "have been part of the fabric of New York City for decades." On September 3, 2013, Bloomberg made a statement on the matter, lauding organizers for being "nothing but cooperative" in the wake of the tragedy.

=== Electric Zoo 2014 ===
In response to the incidents that occurred at the 2013 edition, festival organizers worked with the New York City Department of Parks and Recreation to conduct a review of Electric Zoo's health and safety practices. A stronger security and medical presence was present at Electric Zoo 2014, with a particular focus on preventing illegal drugs from being brought into the festival grounds, and providing additional medical services to attendees. All attendees were required to watch a two-minute-long, anti-drug public service announcement to activate their wristbands before they entered the festival. Additionally, to minimize sun exposure, the festival's daily start time was pushed forward to 1:00 p.m. ET from 11:00 a.m. ET.

The festival was cancelled part-way through its final day, this time due to severe thunderstorms hitting New York City and the United States northeast.

=== Electric Zoo 2015 ===
In December 2014, it was announced that ID&T, organizers of the Tomorrowland festival and a fellow SFX subsidiary, would serve as a "creative partner" for Electric Zoo 2015. The festival was revamped with an "immersive" zoo-themed atmosphere patterned off ID&T's other franchises, featuring new animal-themed stage designs. The revamp was headed by ID&T creative director Jeroen Jansen, who assisted in launching ID&T's other festival brands in the United States. The partnership came as part of an effort to re-launch the festival in the aftermath of the 2013 deaths; steps were also taken to address comments and complaints received via a survey after the 2014 edition, such as entry times and the number of washrooms available. Alesso, Above & Beyond, and The Chemical Brothers were announced on May 1, 2015 as the first headliners of the festival, with the remainder of the festival's lineup revealed throughout the month.

The concert was held over the Labor Day weekend, September 4, 5, 6, 2015.

=== Electric Zoo 2016 ===
Electric Zoo 2016 took place for its eighth year at Randall's Island during Labor Day weekend, 2–4 September 2016. Billboard worked with the event to announce the headliners for the 2016 festival, which included Tiesto, Hardwell, and Bassnectar. Other artists began getting announced on 28 April 2016 via Electric Zoo's social media pages. Stages for the 2016 festival were curated by Anjunadeep, ANTS, Buygore, Dim Mak, Elrow, and Sunday School.

=== Electric Zoo 2018 ===
Electric Zoo 2018 was held during Labor Day weekend on August 31–September 2. It was called "The Big 10," in honor of the festival's 10th anniversary.

=== Electric Zoo 2019 ===
Electric Zoo 2019 was held during Labor Day weekend on August 30–September 1.

=== Electric Zoo 2021 ===
The event was cancelled in 2020 due to the COVID-19 pandemic. The event returned in 2021, with safety protocols including all stages being open-air,, and requiring proof of vaccination in order to attend. The stages featured a new theme, "Supernaturals", including "The Den" (house and techno), "The Gateway" (melodic trance and melodic bass), "The Teleporter", and the main stage "The Hive". The festival was nearly hampered by rains from Hurricane Ida.

=== Electric Zoo 2022 ===
Electric Zoo 2022 was held during Labor Day weekend on September 2–September 4.

=== Electric Zoo 2023 ===
Electric Zoo 2023 was held during Labor Day weekend on September 1–September 3. It was scheduled to open at 1PM on all three days. This edition was infamously marred with notable problems, however.

==== Friday, Sept 1 ====
The first day of the festival was cancelled only 2 hours before the expected start time, due to the New York City Department of Parks and Recreation refusing to grant safety permits. Festival officials claimed the cancellation was a result of "global supply chain disruptions", causing the main stage construction to not be finished on time. The main stage remained incomplete throughout the remainder of the festival.

The last minute cancelation drew the ire of many, including artists that were set to perform on day 1. Pop-up performances were held in Manhattan by some of the artists that were supposed to perform, including Mau P and Bonnie and Clyde.

==== Saturday, Sept 2 ====
The festival opening was delayed by 2 hours on Saturday to 3PM, an announcement that also came at the last minute. However, it was reported that the main stage would not actually be opened until close to 5PM.

To further complicate things, many Friday ticket holders would purchase Saturday and Sunday tickets, leading to hours-long lines at the will call booths on the festival grounds. Festival goers would end up waiting as long as 5 hours just to be admitted entry to the grounds. Once again, public backlash was immense.

==== Sunday, Sept 3 ====
The festival would open at around 1:45PM on Sunday, almost true to its advertised opening time of 1PM. However, the festival soon reached capacity, and Electric Zoo officials and NYPD began denying further entry around 6:30PM. Electric Zoo sent out a social media update that they had reached capacity "due to the challenges caused by Friday cancelation [sic]," and would ask the police to help block traffic heading towards the festival grounds. Ticket-holders were stranded on Randall's Island, and eventually decided to rush through the metal detectors and gates at the entrances. Security was not able to contain the stampede.

==== Aftermath ====
Despite Electric Zoo stating that they would refund Friday ticket-holders, no news of such refunds would come. Lawsuits would come to light, from a number of different parties. Many frustrated ticket-holders began contacting their banks to initiate chargebacks; Electric Zoo would dispute some of these chargebacks, leading to even more public backlash.

No news of another Electric Zoo festival in 2024 came about. Avant Gardner, the owner of Electric Zoo, would still hold music events at their Brooklyn venue; however, it looked like the Electric Zoo festival had come to an end under current ownership.

On June 18, 2024, Electric Zoo made an announcement regarding official refunds, stating that they would begin refunding Friday ticket-holders.

=== Electric Zoo 2024 and beyond ===
Electric Zoo was never scheduled for 2024. It remains unclear whether, after the events of 2023, Electric Zoo will return to New York City.

Following a chaotic series of renovations and closures, Avant Gardner, the parent company of Electric Zoo, filed for Chapter 11 bankruptcy on August 4, 2025.

== Electric Zoo Mexico ==
On December 15, 2013, Made Event announced the first edition of Electric Zoo outside the United States. Electric Zoo Mexico took place May 3 and 4, 2014 in Mexico City.

== Initiatives ==
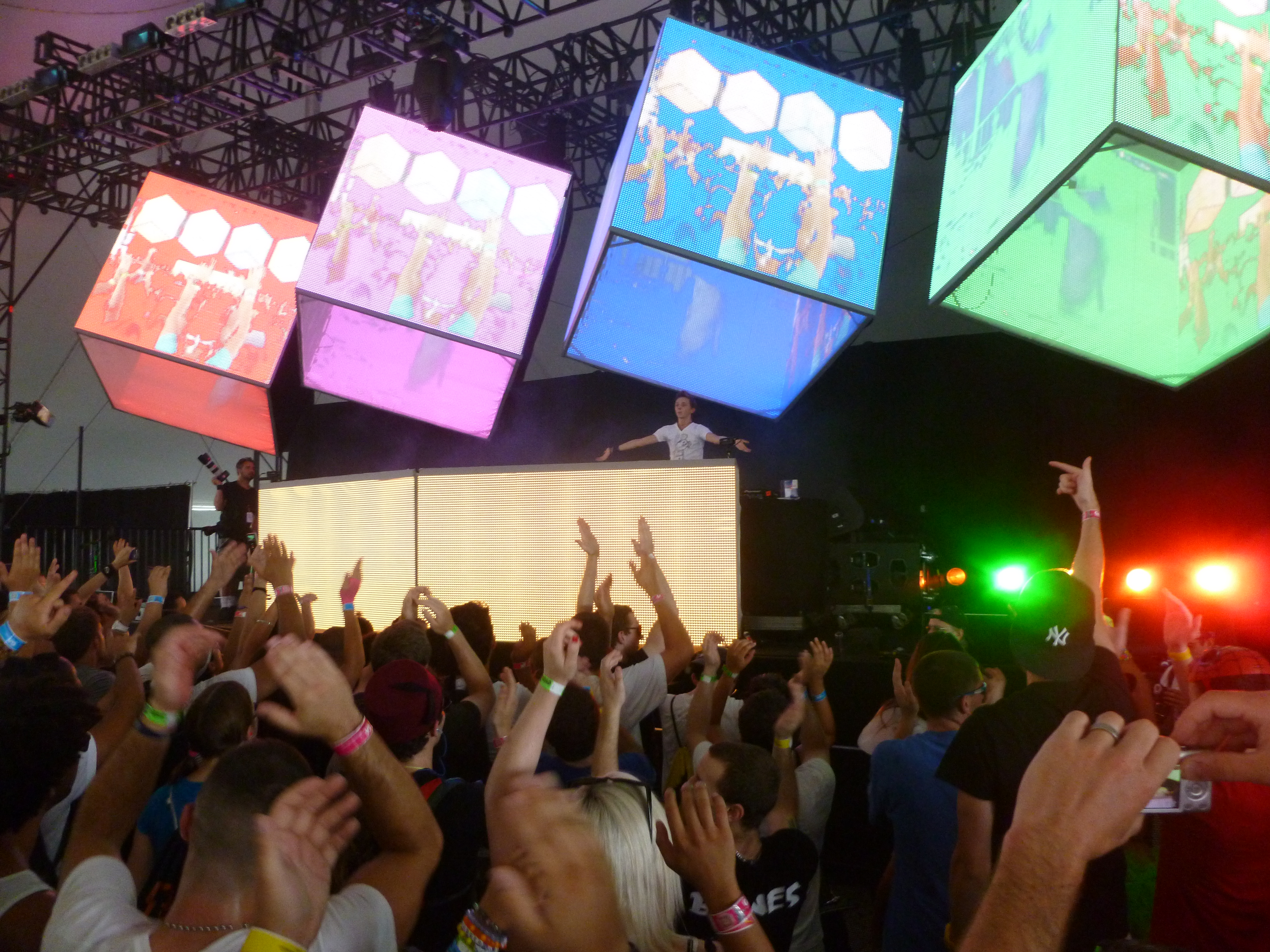
Arty at the Electric Zoo Festival 2011

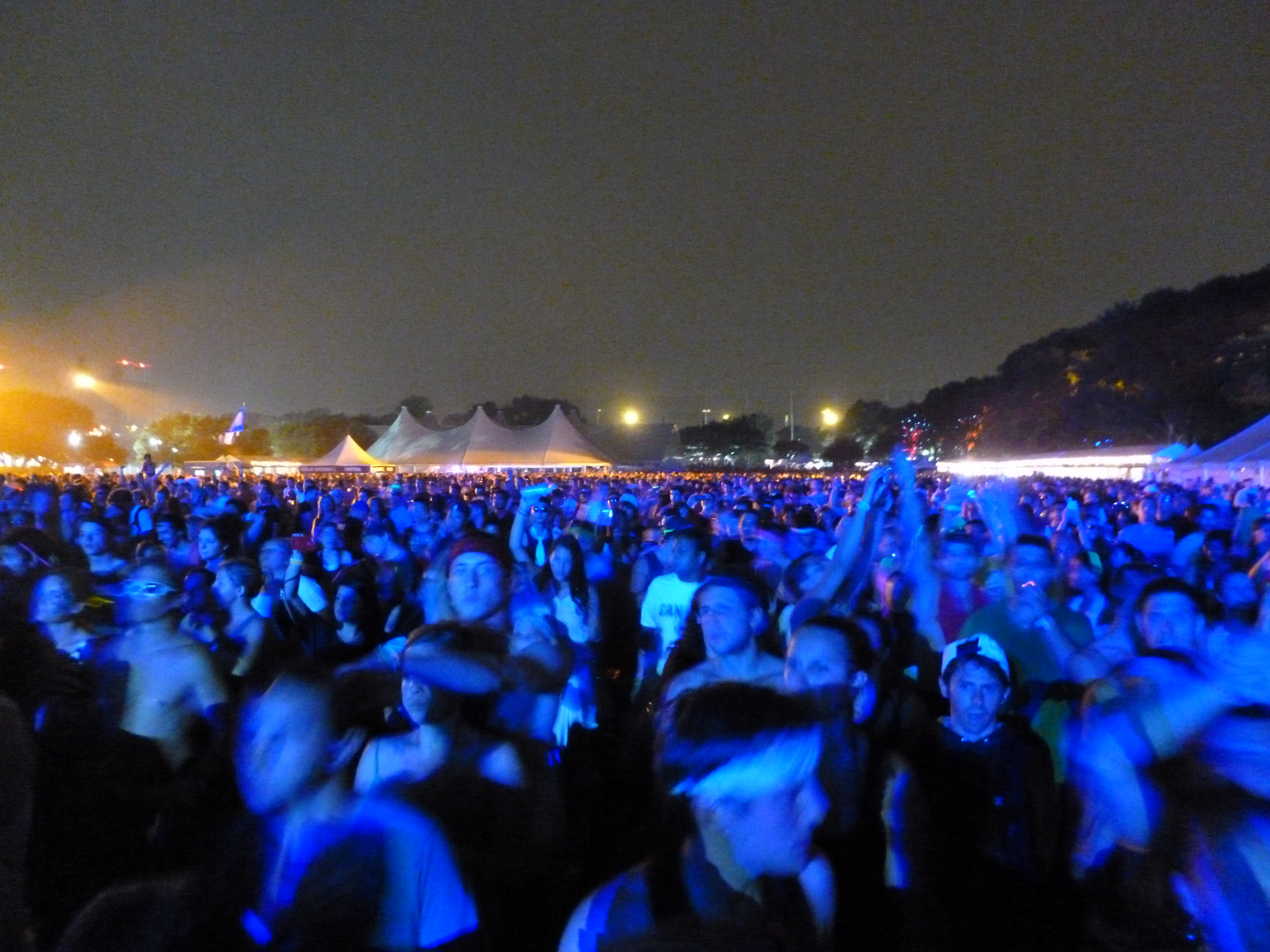
Electric Zoo Festival 2011 at night

In 2010, Made Event donated $42,000 to FLOW, an outdoor art exhibition project in coordination with The Randall's Island Park Alliance, The Bronx Museum of the Arts, and Rockefeller NYC Cultural Innovation Fund. The organizers of Electric Zoo also donated $2 from every ticket sale in 2011 to the project. In 2011, Electric Zoo also partnered with Music Unites, a 501(c)3 non-profit organization, to auction off a Pioneer CDJ-2000 signed by Electric Zoo artists, and helped bring music education to underprivileged children in innercity school systems.

In 2011, Electric Zoo introduced an on-site recycling program for all trash, water in cardboard containers, compostable plates and utensils, began using 100% biodiesel alternative fuel from NYC fryer grease, and required that all food vendors source only organic, hormone-free, humanely raised animals.

== Awards and nominations ==
=== DJ Magazine's top 50 Festivals ===
| Year | Category | Work | Result | Ref. |
|---|---|---|---|---|
| 2019 | World's Best Festival | Electric Zoo – New York City, USA | 41st | |

=== International Dance Music Awards ===
==== Pre-2016 ====
| Year | Category | Work | Result | Ref. |
|---|---|---|---|---|
| 2010 | Best Music Event | Electric Zoo - New York City, New York | Nominated | |
| 2011 | Best Music Event | Electric Zoo - New York City, New York | Nominated | |
| 2012 | Best Music Event | Electric Zoo - New York City, New York | Nominated | |
| 2013 | Best Music Event | Electric Zoo - New York City, New York | Nominated | |
| 2014 | Best Music Event | Electric Zoo - New York City, New York | Nominated | |

==== 2018–present ====
| Year (Note: No award ceremony was held in 2017. In 2018 winners were chosen by the Winter Music Conference themselves. 2019 marks the first year of public voting since the Winter Music Conference's restructure.) | Category | Work | Result | Ref. |
|---|---|---|---|---|
| 2020 | Best Festival | Electric Zoo | Nominated | |

== See also ==
- List of electronic music festivals
