= New York Yankees Radio Network =

Official radio network of MLB's New York Yankees

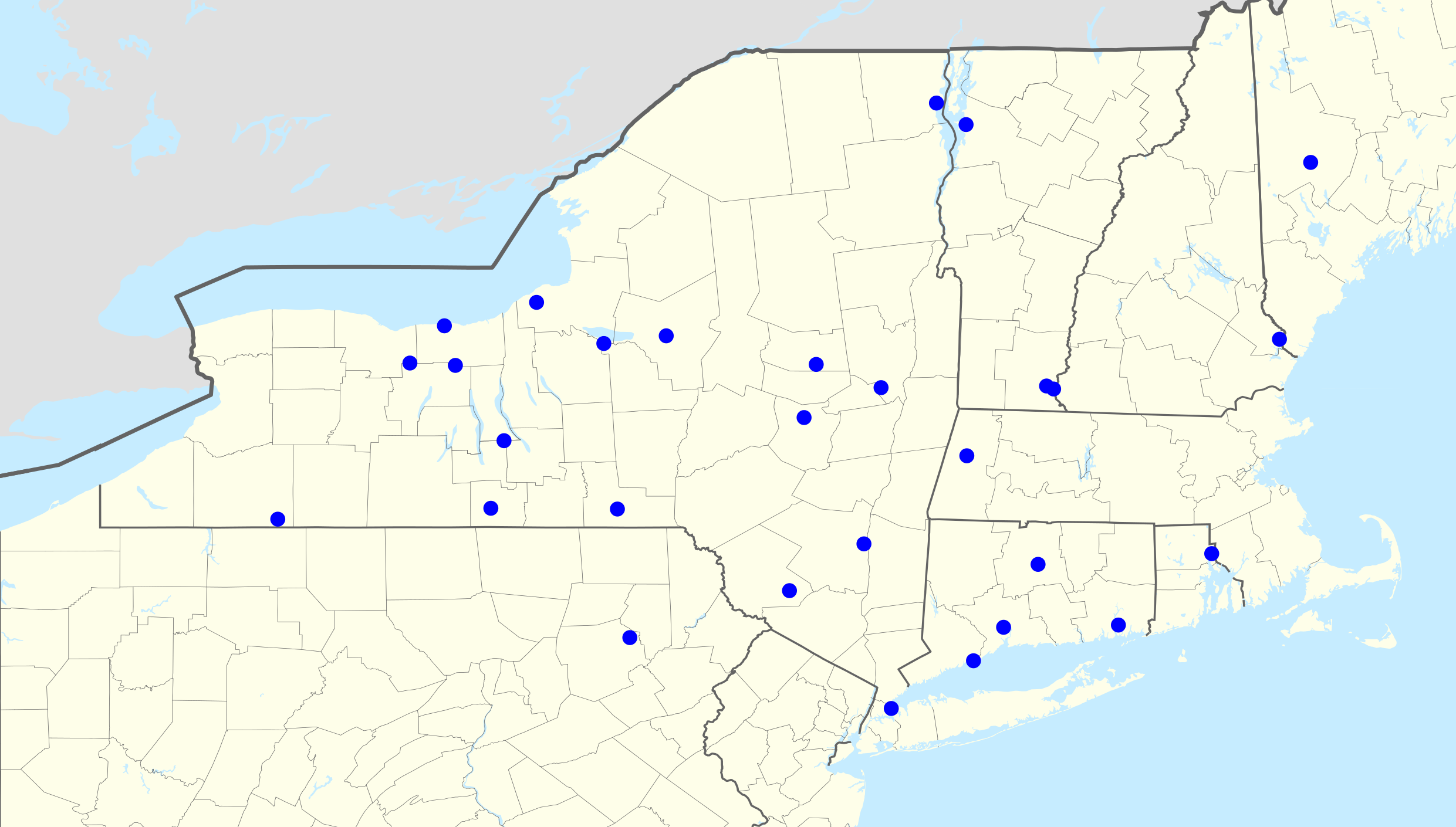
Map of radio affiliates (US Northeast).

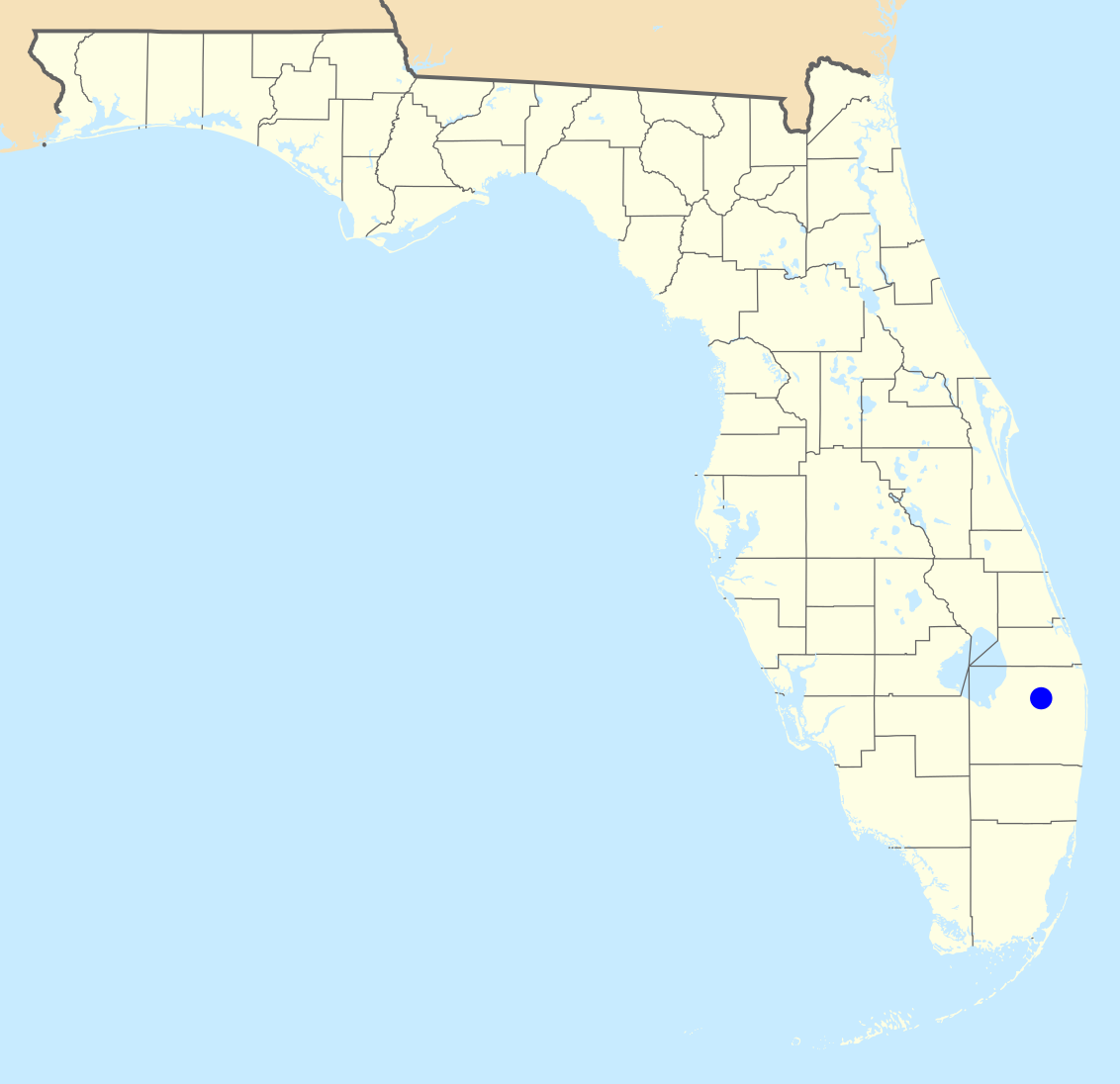
Map of radio affiliates (Florida).

The New York Yankees Radio Network is an Audacy-owned radio network that broadcasts New York Yankees baseball games to 19 stations across 5 states. The network's flagship station is WFAN, which succeeded sister station WCBS as the flagship in 2014; WCBS had aired Yankees broadcasts since the network was founded in 2002 while WFAN had been the flagship station for the Yankees' crosstown rivals, the New York Mets, since the station's founding. (In a rare move, WFAN carried the live broadcast of the Yankees day/night doubleheader at the Baltimore Orioles on August 28, 2011, so WCBS could remain within its usual news format for live, continuing coverage of Hurricane Irene.) The full on-air name of the broadcasts is the WFAN Yankees Radio Network Driven by Jeep, with the Chrysler LLC subsidiary continuing its sponsorship of the network while games are broadcast from the "DuckDuckGo broadcast booth."

The YES Network provides some technical support for each broadcast, and SiriusXM carries the network's feed for every game the Yankees play per their contract. A separate, Spanish-language broadcast airs on New York's WADO, 1280 AM.

The Yankees formed their own radio network in 2002 after WCBS outbid longtime Yankees home WABC for the rights.

== Broadcasters ==
Since 2025, Dave Sims (play-by-play) and Suzyn Waldman (color commentary) have been the Yankees Radio Network broadcast team. Waldman is the first and one of the few women to hold a full-time position with a major league team, and had served as a Yankees beat reporter for the YES Network before moving to the broadcast booth. Waldman was also one of the original personalities at WFAN upon its 1987 launch, where she served as a studio host for various teams (including the New York Knicks, for whom she hosted the pregame show) and also was the station's Yankees beat reporter. Sims joined the Yankees in 2025, following the retirement of longtime play-by-play broadcaster John Sterling.

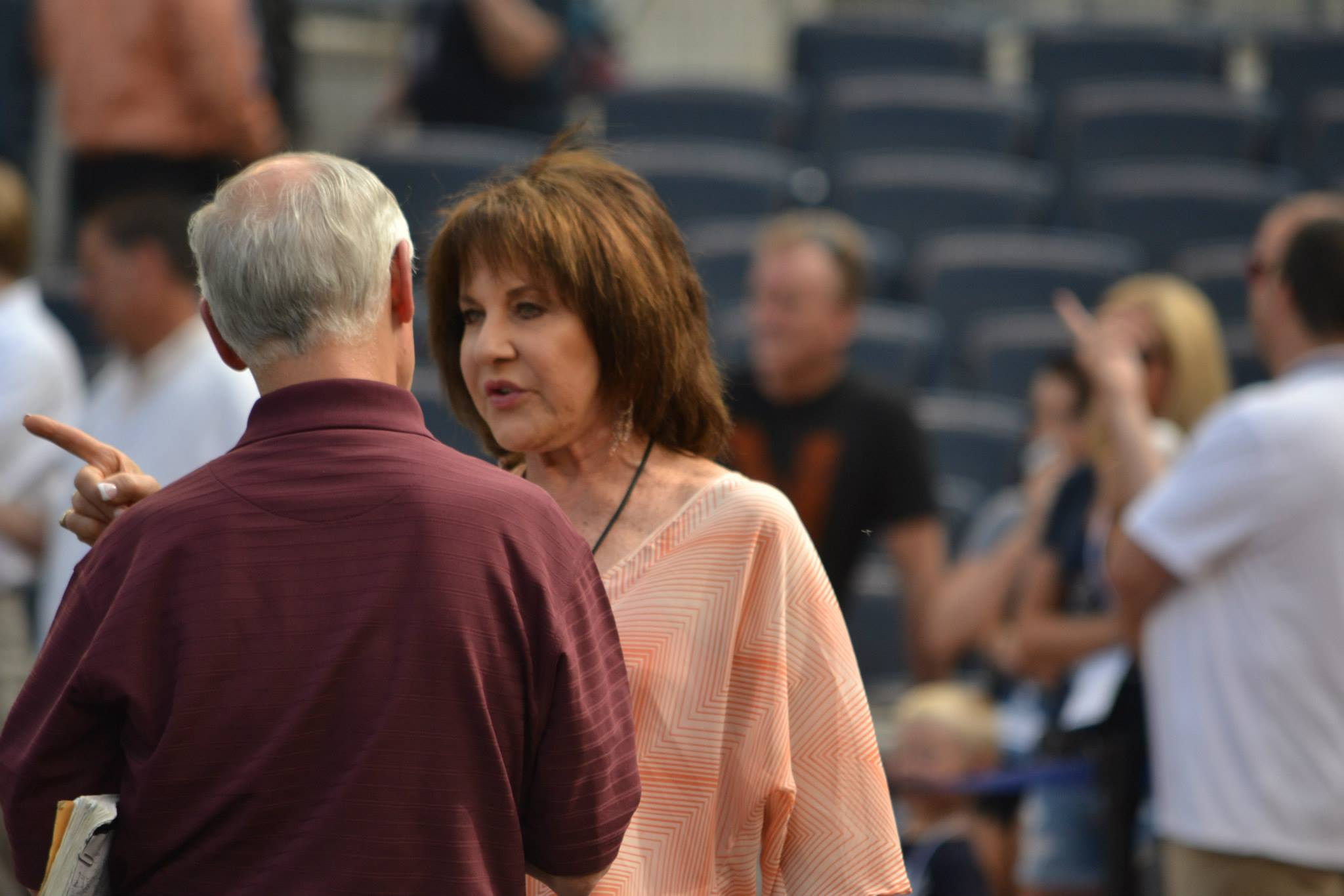
Broadcaster Suzyn Waldman in 2014

The network uses the instrumental version of "Here Come the Yankees" as its theme song, and highlights from past games are dubbed over it for game opens.

=== Previous announcers ===
John Sterling joined the Yankees in 1989 (or more accurately re-joined; he had done work for the Yankees in the 1970s) after calling games for Turner Sports for the previous decade. Prior to the Yankee broadcasts moving from WABC to WCBS, Sterling worked with Jay Johnstone, Joe Angel, and Michael Kay. He was widely known (and perhaps infamous) for his home run calls, which often involved one of his player nicknames or catchphrases, and for saying "Ballgame over! Yankees win! Theeeeeee Yankees win!" after a Yankee victory. Sterling often stretched out "the" for dramatic victories as well as say "Yankees win" in a more excited voice. (If the team loses, Sterling ended with a more subdued "Ballgame over, (opposing team) wins".)

For the inaugural season of the Yankees Radio Network, the team continued the longstanding tradition carried on by WABC, WINS, and other Yankee flagship stations by having a two-man booth where both broadcasters would share play-by-play duties during the game. Because 2002 was also the first season of the YES Network and Michael Kay was called upon to be the team's new lead television voice, the Yankees decided to replace him with longtime ESPN SportsCenter anchor Charley Steiner, who was no stranger to calling baseball on the radio (having been ESPN Radio's lead baseball voice for the previous four seasons) nor to New York sports (having covered New York sports on radio for almost a decade and serving as the voice of both the New Jersey Generals and the New York Jets football teams). The duo worked together for three seasons, with perhaps their most notable call being Steiner's call of Aaron Boone's 2003 American League Championship Series-winning home run.

The Sterling-Steiner partnership lasted until the end of the 2004 season, with their final game together being Game 7 of that year's American League Championship Series that the Yankees lost to become the first team in Major League Baseball history to lose a series they led 3-0. After that season, to make room for Suzyn Waldman's move to the broadcast booth, Steiner was to become the YES Network's studio host for Yankee games as well as for its coverage of the then-New Jersey Nets, a spot that opened after Fred Hickman left YES for ESPN. This did not come to pass, however, as Steiner elected to go west and replace the fired Ross Porter at the Los Angeles Dodgers Radio Network.

In April 2024, Sterling retired abruptly and was succeeded by a rotation of play-by-play announcers including Emmanuel Berbari, Justin Shackil and Spanish radio broadcaster Rickie Ricardo. He returned for the last few series of the season through the team's loss in the 2024 World Series before a final retirement. He was succeeded in 2025 by former Mariners play-by-play man Dave Sims.

== Format ==
The broadcast begins with the pregame show, which begins approximately forty minutes prior to first pitch and runs for approximately twenty-five minutes. It is sponsored by BMW's New York dealer network, and the proper name for the show is the "Nissan New York Yankees Pregame Program". Sterling opens the broadcast by introducing himself, Waldman, and his producer, then leads into the Manager's Show. This portion of the show features an interview by Waldman with Yankees manager Aaron Boone. Sterling then follows with Diamond Notes, relaying news from around the league. The Leadoff Spot feature is next, with Waldman usually talking to a member of the opposing team.

In the opposing half of the fifth inning, a reporter from one of the New York newspapers has joined the broadcast booth to offer some insight on team business. For many years, the reporter was the beat writer from the New York Daily News and the half-inning was known as the Daily News Fifth. Beginning in 2014 the fifth inning segment is called Post Time and a reporter from the New York Post joins the booth.

For the last inning or so, depending on how long the game continues, Sterling will announce the game by himself so Waldman can get a head start on her postgame duties. After the game ends Waldman will choose a player for her "Star of the Game" interview and then head into the clubhouse. Beginning in 2014, the Star of the Game segment is featured after every game; it used to be only featured if the Yankees won the game. Regardless of whether the Yankees win or not, after the final out (and the proceedings to follow), Sterling returns from one last commercial break with the totals and the winning and losing pitchers and closes the broadcast.

After another commercial break the postgame show begins, with Sweeny Murti hosting. The program starts with a recap of the game, with highlights interspersed where necessary. Included in the recap are the Drive of the Game, a home run or extra base hit that drove in multiple runs sponsored by Audi, the best defensive play of the game, and the play determined to be the turning point of the game. As has been the case for years, remembering the turning point of the game could win a fan a prize during the midday show the next morning; in 2014, the prize is a team watch and a pair of tickets to a future home game.

Waldman follows with the Clubhouse Report, relaying information from the postgame press conferences and interviews with players. This is followed by a rundown of scores from other MLB games from the evening and an update on the Yankees' minor league affiliates. An interview from the clubhouse is then played and after this, Murti reviews the next night's pitching matchup and game time and closes the broadcast.

== Affiliate stations ==
The current affiliates are:

=== Connecticut ===
- 960 AM WELI New Haven
- 97.9 FM WUCS Windsor Locks/Hartford

=== Hawaii ===
- 1420 AM KKEA: Honolulu
- 1500 AM KHKA: Honolulu

=== Florida ===
- 820 AM WWBA Tampa

=== New Mexico ===
- 101.7 FM KQTM Albuquerque

=== New York ===
- 660 AM / 101.9 FM WFAN New York Flagship
- 1420 AM WACK: Newark
- 1340 AM WENT Gloversville
- 1220 AM WGNY Newburgh/Middletown
- 680 AM / 96.9 FM WINR Binghamton
- 1160 AM / 107.1 FM WPIE Trumansburg
- 1190 AM / 94.3 FM WSDE Cobleskill
- 99.5 FM WTKW Bridgeport
- 104.5FM WTMM-FM Mechanicville
- 1340 AM / 105.3 FM WLVL Lockport (Buffalo)
- 1340 AM WIRY Plattsburgh
- 103.5FM WUUF: Sodus
- 105.5/WTKV: Minetto

=== Former affiliates (20 stations) ===
- WMEN/640: West Palm Beach, Florida ????-202?, not on 2024 list)
- WOKO/1460: Albany, New York
- WROW/590: Albany, New York (1980-1990 seasons)
- WKNY/1490: Kingston
- WKXP/94.3: Kingston (2003-2011 seasons)
- WIXT/1230: Little Falls, New York (????-202?, not on 2024 list; simulcast of WRNY/1350-Rome, New York)
- WALL/1340: Middletown (2000-2002 seasons)
- WEOK/1390: Poughkeepsie (1991-1993 seasons), (2000-2002 seasons)
- WQBK/1300: Rensselaer, New York (1993-1994 seasons)
- WQBK-FM/103.9: Rensselaer, New York
- WTMM/1300: Rensselaer, New York (2000-2007 seasons)
- WRNY/1350: Rome, New York (????-202?, not on 2024 list)
- WGY/810: Schenectady, New York
- WNBL/107.3: South Bristol, New York
- WVKZ/1240: Schenectady, New York (1989-1991 seasons)
- WWWD/1240: Schenectady, New York
- WSTL/1410: South Glens Falls, New York
- WTLB/1310: Utica, New York (????-202?, not on 2024 list; simulcast of WRNY/1350-Rome)
- WZAD/97.3: Wurtsboro (2006-2011 seasons)
- WJFP/740: Chester, Pennsylvania (????-202?, station is not on 2024 list)
- WPRV/790: Providence, Rhode Island (200?-2023)

== See also ==
- New York Mets Radio Network
