= WRRB =

Coordinates: 41.719°N 73.996°W

Simulcasts WRRV, Middletown
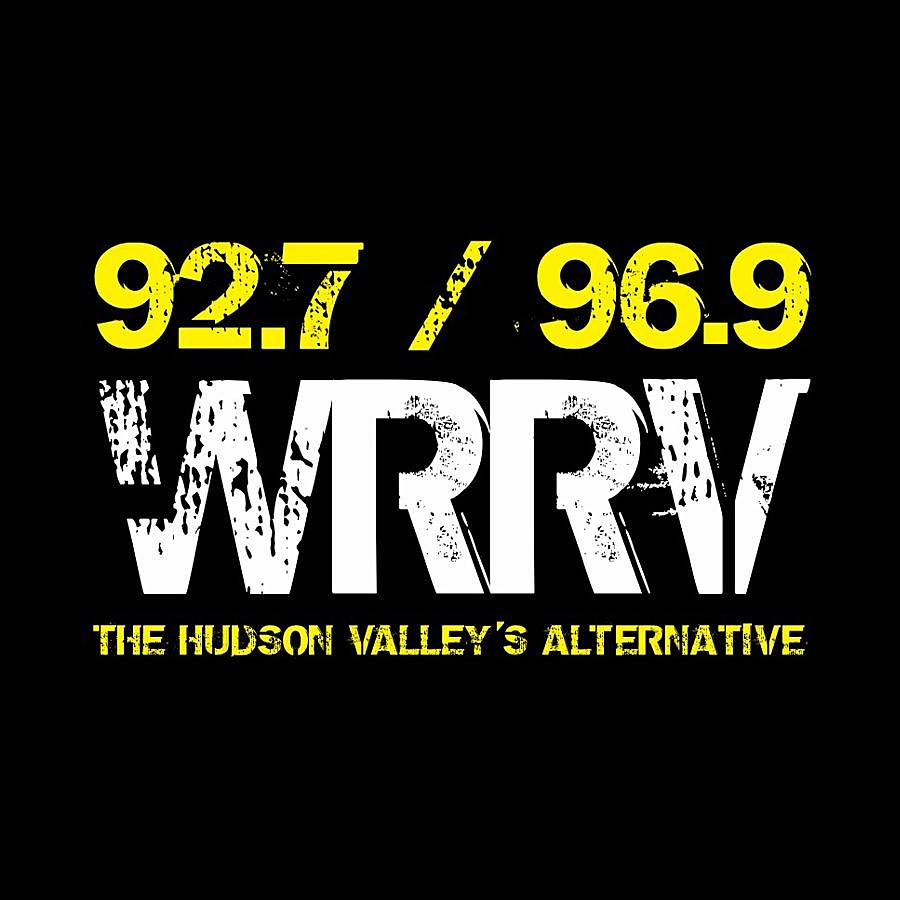
- Arlington, New York; United States
- Broadcast area: Mid-Hudson Valley
- Frequency: 96.9 MHz
- Branding: 92.7/96.9 WRRV

Programming
- Format: Alternative rock

Ownership
- Owner: Townsquare Media; (Townsquare License, LLC)

History
- First air date: 1989
- Former call signs: WEXT (1989–1991); WKIP-FM (1991–1993); WDSP (1993–1997)
- Call sign meaning: similar to WRRB, or "WRRV B" (secondary) signal

Technical information
- Licensing authority: FCC
- Facility ID: 10780
- Class: A
- ERP: 310 watts
- HAAT: 307 meters (1,007 ft)

Links
- Public license information: Public file; LMS
- Webcast: Listen live
- Website: wrrv.com

WRRB (96.9 FM) is an alternative rock radio station licensed to Arlington, New York, and serving the Mid-Hudson Valley of New York state. The station is owned by Townsquare Media and broadcasts at 310 watts ERP from the Illinois Mountain master tower in Marlborough, New York. It is a simulcast of WRRV (92.7 FM) from Middletown.

== Programming ==
WRRB's programming is simulcast with that of WRRV (92.7 FM) in Middletown, New York, which serves the lower Hudson Valley, Catskills, Sussex County, New Jersey and Pike County, Pennsylvania. Though WRRV is promoted as the primary station, WRRB is the more dominant of the two based on cume and sales (and the fact that, since 2000, the station has been run out of the longtime studios of sister WPDH on Pendell Road in Poughkeepsie.

== History ==
The 96.9 frequency came on the air in late 1989 as Bridge Broadcasting-owned WEX' ("Next FM") running a "new adult contemporary" format (a combination of smooth jazz and new-age music). Aside from its license, WEXT had another first in being the first station operated by a local marketing agreement (LMA) as Richard Novik–owner of WKIP and WRNQ in Poughkeepsie–later controlled WEXT.

WEXT's format was a bit ahead of its time and though it had a strong start and admiration of music critics and musicophiles, this critical success did not translate into ratings as "Next FM" was the market's lowest rated FM signal in its only Arbitron ratings book in 1990. Even with the station's poor ratings, it was seen as a threat to the ratings of the more mainstream and successful WRNQ.

To boost WRNQ, Novik flipped WEXT's format to a simulcast of the talk radio format of WKIP in February 1991 as WKIP-FM. Though the two stations split off at points, the simulcast of WKIP came with nearly no measurable ratings on 96.9 and at a financial loss on Novik's end. In August 1993, Novik terminated the LMA with Bridge who on September 1 of that year began an LMA with Woodstock-based WDST, bringing that station's storied adult album alternative format to points south under the call sign WDSP.

With a dedicated existing WDST audience on board and a good number of new listeners, WDSP became a middle-of-the pack station overall in the market but with good demographics; this success led Bridge to sell the station to WDST owner CHET-5 Broadcasting in 1994. The station remained moderately successful, however a financial crisis in early 1997 led CHET-5 to sell WDSP and WKNY in Kingston to the Crystal Radio Group in April of that year. Seeing an opportunity to take its WRRV in Middletown to a full-market signal, WDSP flipped to a WRRV simulcast as WRRB.

In October 2000, Crystal sold its holdings to Aurora Communications, which a year later was bought out by Cumulus Media. On August 30, 2013, a deal was announced in which Cumulus would swap its stations in Dubuque, Iowa, and Poughkeepsie (including WRRB) to Townsquare Media in exchange for Peak Broadcasting's stations in Fresno, California. The deal was part of Cumulus' acquisition of Dial Global; Townsquare, Peak, and Dial Global were all controlled by Oaktree Capital Management. The sale to Townsquare was completed on November 14, 2013.
