= WDBY =

- Patterson, New York; United States
- Broadcast area: Eastern Hudson Valley and Danbury, Connecticut
- Frequency: 105.5 MHz (HD Radio)
- Branding: The Wolf

Programming
- Format: Country
- Affiliations: Compass Media Networks

Ownership
- Owner: Townsquare Media; (Townsquare License, LLC)
- Sister stations: WRKI

History
- First air date: 1981
- Former call signs: WRVH (1981-86); WMJV-FM (1986-95); WVYB (1995–1996); WAXB (1996–2002)
- Call sign meaning: Danbury

Technical information
- Licensing authority: FCC
- Facility ID: 67815
- Class: A
- ERP: 900 watts
- HAAT: 186 meters (610 ft)
- Transmitter coordinates: 41.522°N 73.635°W
- Repeater: 105.5 WDBY-FM1 (Brookfield, Connecticut)

Links
- Public license information: Public file; LMS
- Webcast: Listen live
- Website: danburycountry.com

WDBY (105.5 FM, "The Wolf") is an American country music radio station licensed to Patterson, New York. The station serves the eastern Hudson Valley and Greater Danbury, Connecticut, listening areas, as part of a trimulcast with 97.7 WCZX in the Poughkeepsie area and 97.3 WZAD in the Catskill Mountains. The station is owned by Townsquare Media and broadcasts from a tower located in Patterson, near the Putnam/Dutchess county line. WDBY also operates a booster, WDBY-FM1 in Brookfield, Connecticut, which broadcasts with 1.2 kilowatts.

Though it is the only FM station in Putnam County, WDBY's primary target market has historically been Danbury, Connecticut. Even though the hills in and around Danbury limits the main 105.5 signal, the Brookfield booster has the ability to cover the primary coverage area. WDBY also targets eastern Putnam County as well as southern Dutchess County, where it regularly rates in the Poughkeepsie market. Due to its tower height, WDBY's signal covers most of the Route 22/I-684 corridor. The WDBY studios and offices are located on Ives Street in Downtown Danbury.

== History ==
=== Early days and Majic 105 ===
The 105.5 frequency licensed to Patterson/Pawling first signed on as WRVH. The first license was granted on May 20, 1982. WRVH was a class A facility with 3,000 watts of effective radiated power. Its studio was located on New York State Route 292 in Patterson, New York.

WRVH was founded by retired IBM engineer Edward Valentine, who also served as the station's general manager. Valentine was able to find a "gray area" at 105.5, at sufficient distance from WDHA-FM in Morristown, New Jersey, as to avoid short-spacing with that co-channel station.

When Valentine ran short of funds to complete building the station, he partnered with Richard Novik, owner of now-defunct WPUT (1510 AM) in Brewster, New York. Novik had always wanted an FM station to accompany WPUT, but was unable to find one until Valentine found the "gray area" at 105.5; Novik filed a competing application for that frequency, but the construction permit was awarded to Valentine. When Valentine's funding ran short, he partnered with Novik to put WRVH on the air.

The station's format was beautiful music: a compromise, as Valentine had wanted a classical music format, and Novik wanted a contemporary format. Valentine did manage to get some classical music on the station: an hour a day at 7:00 p.m. weeknights, called "Tableside Concert"; as well as a couple of specialty shows on Sundays. The beautiful music format was not a great success, as WRVH (with its Class A signal) was up against 2 giants: WHUD in Peekskill, New York; and WEZN in Bridgeport, Connecticut, both with Class B signals and both running beautiful music formats.

The original staff consisted of Ron Wilson (from WPUT) in mornings; Jennifer Dudley in afternoons; Kenn Hayes (from WKTU and WTFM in New York City) at night; and Kevin O’Keefe on overnights. Hayes also hosted the nightly "Tableside Concert" classical music program and the Sunday classical program "The Sound of Things to Come" (featuring then-new CD technology); while also working at WPAT-FM (beautiful music) and WQXR-FM (classical) in New York City.

In the mid-1980s, beautiful music began to decline in ratings. Listeners were aging-out of the format; stations began adding more vocals. Valentine and Novik sold WRVH to Ron Graiff, who changed the format to adult contemporary, and the call letters to WMJV-FM. The station became "Majic 105" on July 21, 1986; the WMJV call sign stood for "Majic" (MJ) and the Roman numeral for 5 (V). The station's new main competitor was then contemporary-formatted WVIP-FM and later WHUD and WDAQ.

In the early 1990s, Majic 105's on-air staff included Bob Stanhope, Dick Farrell and Gary Peters (mornings), PD/MD Al Matthews (middays), Flora Whitelaw, Langdon Towne and Cutler Whitman (afternoons), "Rich Andrews" aka talk show host Joe Thomas, Hank Tuttle and Jim Hartman (nights), John Harrison, Cutler Whitman, Langdon Towne and Christian (Chris Chase) Switzer (overnights) and weekenders Joe Rondini, JJ, Jed Taylor, Rob "Robbie" Adams and Rob Deldin.

=== Putnam/Westchester simulcast and Super Station era ===
In the early 1990s, Majic 105 began to have more competition as the rivals it had as WRVH also evolved to adult contemporary, in turn giving the station bigger signaled and heritage competition. In late September 1993 in order to more effectively compete with WHUD and WFAS-FM in Westchester and Putnam County and WDAQ in Danbury, Majic 105's owner/manager Ron Graiff acted on impulse and purchased WVIP-FM in Mount Kisco, New York, from Martin Stone. WVIP-FM by then had encountered tough times, it was airing a gold-based AC format with some dayparts live and some satellite-fed. It had become a shell of its former self. The plan was to expand WMJV's reach via simulcast further south into Westchester County for a bigger and better area-wide signal. The stations could then be heard from Dover Plains to White Plains. On September 24 at 7:00 p.m. Alix Bragga did the last show on WVIP-FM. The last song played was "The Star Spangled Banner" by Whitney Houston. The station then signed off at midnight and was moved overnight from Radio Circle in Mount Kisco to the WMJV studios in West Patterson. On September 25, the plan turned into reality as WVIP-FM became WMJU (the calls meant nothing, but was alphabetically before WMJV and looked similar). The stations were then simulcast and branded as "NY's Super Station" super-serving both Putnam County and Westchester County. Weekender Jed Taylor did the first show at 6:00 a.m. The format was upgraded from AC to hot adult contemporary and in time it became Putnam County's Arbitron rated #1 radio station. At its peak, Super Station had a music library of almost 1,300 songs that spanned the 1970s, 1980s up to the mid-1990s and was consistently rotated. All music decisions were made in-house and its positioning statement was "The Most Music and the Best Variety". It was very successful for its time although it lasted just two years.

Super Station was locally programmed by multi-market PD (and former WVIP-AM-FM PD) Al Matthews (middays) with an air staff that included Gary Peters, Ray Graff and John Chipman (mornings), Cutler Whitman and Chris Cimmino (afternoons), APD/MD Jim Hartman (nights), Langdon Towne (overnights) and weekenders Jed Taylor, Alix Bragga, Colleen Brown, KC Kressu, Kyle Kelley, Steve Maiolo, Bobby West, Tim Court, Paul Hoch, Chris Todaro, Jim McCannon, Mike Cannavaro and Rob Deldin. The news department was headed by ND Janice Berliner (mornings), Jennifer Fogarty and Greg Messinger (afternoons). Morning and afternoon traffic reports were handled by Kyle Kelley and Steve Maiolo. The chief engineer was Ron Graiff, the owner, who had been handling these duties since purchasing the station in 1986. Weekend music programs included a local Top 30 Countdown on Friday nights, The Retro Show (dance classics) on Saturday nights and Casey's Hot 20 on Sunday nights. Super Station's jingle package was produced by JAM Creative Productions and the stations liners were voiced by John Driscoll.

=== Sold stations, format changes and relocations ===
On October 2, 1995, Ron Graiff sold the stations (along with AM sister station WPUT) to Gary Starr, owner of WINE and WRKI in Brookfield, Connecticut. He dropped the "Super Station" brand, changed the call letters to WVYB/WVIB (to remind listeners of the old WVIP-FM) and flipped the format to a gold-based AC branded as "B-105/B-106"; the format was similar to what WVIP-FM was airing prior to its 1993 sale. That afternoon at 3:00 p.m. Chris Cimmino and then Chris Todaro did the last Super Station show. The last song played was "Goodbye Stranger" by Supertramp. at 7:00 p.m. Jim Hartman did the first B-105/B-106 show. The new format was put into place and the music library was then drastically cut. Lorna Potter took over as general/sales manager. PD Al Matthews left and Emily Anton took over middays. The I-95 PD's Lou Rizzo and then Tim Sheehan were the program directors (though they were still based at WRKI) and Alan Sneed (based in Atlanta, Georgia) was hired as a programming and music consultant. Then, in about four weeks time, the stations were sold again to Commodore Media Inc. (Commodore Media would later be sold to Capstar Broadcasting) and the two stations were then split up from its simulcast, format, call letters and location. The entire staff except for the morning show were let go. WVYB's new calls were WAXB (the B-105 brand was kept) with an oldies format via satellite from Westwood One except for its live morning show with John Chipman and Steve Maiolo. The station was moved to the WRKI studios in Brookfield, Connecticut, and its Arbitron market was changed from Poughkeepsie, New York, to Danbury, Connecticut. In October 2008 Cumulus Media sold the West Patterson, New York, property and its new owners tore down the long unused studio building. It has now become a newly built residential location.

WVIB's new calls were WZZN (The Zone-slogan though not used) with a short-lived jazz and then short-lived classic rock format also via satellite except for its live morning show with Emily Anton. Both formats were unsuccessful. The station was moved to the WFAS studios in Hartsdale, New York and eventually changed its calls to WFAF (sounds like WFAS) to become a northern simulcast of WFAS-FM and its AC format. On February 29, 2012, Cumulus dropped the WFAS/WFAF simulcast and started simulcasting country WDBY on it, in essence returning it to what it had been during its Super Station years albeit now with country. The calls were changed to WDVY (sounds like WDBY).

In 2006, when its iron-clad 40-year lease was up, WFAF's tower was moved from atop Darlington Castle to the Fox Lane Campus in Bedford and since then, its signal is not as strong due to a decrease in both terrain and tower height. Due to economic conditions and signal issues, the 106.3 frequency has never been a stand-alone FM since its sale and split from WVIP back in late September 1993. It has been and still is a simulcasted signal-first with WMJV/WVYB, then WFAS, for a short time WPDH and then again WFAS and now WDBY. Cumulus eventually sold WDVY to Family Stations and on January 14, 2013, country was out and non-commercial religion was in. WPUT also flipped its satellite format from country to adult standards and then to ESPN Radio. The daytime-only station was licensed to Brewster, New York, before the station went off-air in 2014 and its license was deleted in 2015.

=== From B-105 to Y-105 to Kicks 105-5 to The Wolf ===
When Capstar Broadcasting was purchased by AMFM Inc. (a subsidiary of what would become Clear Channel Communications) in 1999, the company was forced to divest its holdings in the northern suburbs of New York City due to Federal Communications Commission market concentration concerns. When Aurora Communications purchased those stations WAXB saw an increase in its budget that allowed the station to eliminate satellite fed programming. With this came a modified name, "B105.5", and modified oldies that leaned as recent as the early 1980s. However, Aurora's ownership was to be short-lived as in 2000 a failed buyout by Nassau Broadcasting took place which was followed in 2001 by Aurora being bought out by Cumulus Media.

After Cumulus took control of the Aurora stations in April 2002, control of the Danbury cluster became separate from their Hudson Valley cluster. Though WAXB had good ratings in both Danbury and Dutchess County with oldies, listeners were aging out of the format and Cumulus management sensed a hole for a more contemporary competitor against market rival WDAQ. WAXB flipped to Adult Top 40 on September 26, 2002, as Y-105 after two days of stunting and taking the new WDBY calls (for Danbury) that October. (The WAXB calls returned to the market in 2011 on 850 AM in Ridgefield, a sister station to WDAQ.) It forced 98Q to move to a more Top 40 approach in both music and presentation. Y-105 later evolved from a bright AC to a hot AC. On January 12, 2009, Y-105 hired longtime 98Q morning host Mr. Morning to host its morning show. WDBY switched to its current country format on January 11, 2010.

On August 30, 2013, a deal was announced in which Townsquare Media would acquire 53 Cumulus stations, including WDBY, for $238 million. The deal was part of Cumulus' acquisition of Dial Global; Townsquare and Dial Global were both controlled by Oaktree Capital Management. The sale to Townsquare was completed on November 14, 2013.

On April 15, 2021, WDBY rebranded as "The Wolf".

== HD Radio ==
Cumulus Broadcasting began upgrading its stations to HD Radio broadcasting in 2005. One of the first ten stations to be upgraded was WDBY.

== Booster ==
Call sign	Frequency	City of license	FID	ERP (W)	Class	Transmitter coordinates	FCC info
WDBY-FM1	105.5 FM	Brookfield, Connecticut	128387	1,200	D	41°24′18.3″N 73°26′46.4″W	LMS
