= Dead Air Dave =

Dead Air Dave was one of several on-air names used by the radio personality who currently calls himself Dylan. He has also broadcast as Nigel, A.B., A.B. Love, and Ashok (which is his actual first name). He got his start in the radio business as an intern at WXRK New York in 1994.

Dave's first on-air gig was at WPDH (Poughkeepsie). Over the next four years, he moved on to WBHT (Wilkes-Barre/Scranton), WRRV (Middletown), WKRZ (Wilkes-Barre/Scranton), and WDBZ/WNSR/WBIX (New York City).

He took the name "Dead Air" Dave when he was hired back as a personality on WXRK New York in September 1998. In March 2002, as part of an agreement that guaranteed him three weekly airshifts, he begrudgingly accepted the position of monitoring The Howard Stern Show for content that then-GM Tom Chiusano feared would incur a fine for indecency by the FCC and pressing a dump button when questionable content arose. Dave was then frequently used as an on-air punching bag for Howard's frustrations with the increasingly difficult FCC regulated broadcast climate and censorship. During this time, he was also an on-air personality for the Sirius Satellite Radio channels Hits 1, The Pulse, and 90s on 9.

Dave left WXRK in January 2006 when it became "Free-FM" (WFNY-FM) and soon after appeared on The Howard Stern Show (newly on Sirius) to discuss his time as the show's censor and his video documentary Irritation: A Radio Saga, which was available to watch for free on his then-website deadairdave.net.

Although Dead Air Dave is no longer a part of The Howard Stern Show, his voice was heard on Howard TV as the voiceover announcer for the original series "Wack Pack Bowling" as well as "DJ Black Cloud", a special documenting Scott the Engineer's triumphant return to party hosting.

Dave is currently using the on-air name "Dylan". He was the afternoon drive host (3–8 pm) on WWFS (New York City) from 2007 to 2015, and is currently doing weekends/swing at WKTU, New York City.
