= WDST =

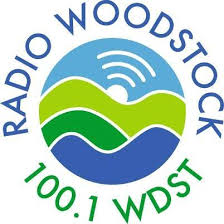
- Woodstock, New York; United States
- Broadcast area: Hudson Valley
- Frequency: 100.1 MHz
- Branding: Radio Woodstock

Programming
- Format: Adult album alternative

Ownership
- Owner: CHET-5 Broadcasting

History
- First air date: April 29, 1980
- Call sign meaning: "Woodstock"

Technical information
- Licensing authority: FCC
- Facility ID: 10781
- Class: A
- ERP: 3,000 watts
- HAAT: 96 meters (315 ft)
- Transmitter coordinates: 41°59′24.25″N 74°1′5.2572″W

Links
- Public license information: Public file; LMS
- Webcast: Listen live (via iHeartRadio)
- Website: radiowoodstock.com

WDST (100.1 MHz), branded as "Radio Woodstock 100.1", is a commercial radio station licensed to serve Woodstock, New York. Radio Woodstock is known as a progressive rock station that was at the forefront of both the modern rock and adult album alternative (triple A) formats. The station's studios are in the former West Hurley Methodist church on Route 28.

WDST is owned by CHET-5 Broadcasting, its effective radiated power is 3,000 watts. The station's transmitter is on Miggins Road in the Town of Kingston.

== History ==
On April 29, 1980, WDST first signed on the air from studios in Woodstock, New York, and a tower in Lake Katrine. Initially, WDST featured a free-form format which was described as "public radio with commercials". From its start until being sold in 1993, it used the slogan "The Bulldog of the Hudson Valley".

During this free-form period under program director Richard Fusco, though the station's eclectic format won three Billboard "Station of the Year" awards, the rock portions of the station's programming became the most-listened-to. WDST evolved its format more towards rock music, though free-form elements would remain until the early 1990s. Early hosts include Jeanne Atwood and nighttime DJ The Mysterious Robo. The progressive rock lean of the original format would evolve into an early modern rock format by the mid-1990s. The rise of alternative rock, a genre WDST had to itself, saw the station improve its overall listenership by the early 1990s.

In 1993, WDST was sold to CHET-5 Broadcasting along with WKNY in Kingston. Principal owner Gary Chetkof promoted Nic Harcourt to the morning show and the station was programmed with an alt-rock format. WDST soon thereafter purchased a radio station in Arlington, New York (a suburb of Poughkeepsie), and simulcast WDST on FM 96.9 MHz (also known as WDSP). It was a natural extension for the 96.9 MHz signal, which debuted in the late 1980s as WEXP Next FM, offering an eclectic mix of modern rock and progressive rock elements.

In April 1997, WDSP and WKNY were sold to the Crystal Radio Group, owners of WPDH and WRRV. Because of the loss of the 96.9 MHz simulcast, much of the station's coverage south of Poughkeepsie was lost. In 1998, WDST moved its transmitter site to a tower on Hallihan Hill in the Town of Kingston, slightly north west of the city. This greatly improved overall coverage in the Hudson Valley. Small areas of coverage to the south were restored via translators in Newburgh (1998) and Poughkeepsie (the Poughkeepsie translator service being discontinued in August 2009). Shortly after the sale, then Program Director (PD) Dave Leonard left to start The Woodstock Broadcasting Network at Utopia Studios and (MD) Nic Harcourt left for KCRW in Los Angeles, California, where he hosted Morning Becomes Eclectic until December 2, 2008.

To diversify its business offerings, Chetkof started to produce concerts in and around the Hudson Valley and became one of the largest independent concert promoters in the Hudson Valley. It is estimated that Radio Woodstock's concert division has produced over 500 shows, including one day music festivals such as The Felice County Fair at Opus 40 in Saugerties, the Speed of Sound Festival in Wappingers Falls outside Poughkeepsie (with headliners the Avett Brothers in 2015 and The Lumineers in 2016), and various Craft Beer Festivals known as the Boogaloo.

In 2005, to celebrate its 25th anniversary, Gary Chetkof formed a new company to produce a musical festival on behalf of the radio station. The Festival was named Mountain Jam after the Allman Brothers song, and was such a success, that it was brought back the following year as a 2-day music and camping festival. The Festival expanded to 3 days the following year, and is currently the Northeast's biggest music and camping festival. In 2013, Chetkof partnered with Townsquare Media to launch the Taste of Country Music Festival the weekend after Mountain Jam and that festival became the largest country music camping festival in the Northeast for 8 years. As part of the deal with Townsquare Media, Townsquare also became partners in Mountain Jam and the festival gradually shifted its programming from Jamband music to Inde/Alt Rock. In 2018, Chetkof and Townsqaure parted ways, with Chetkof owning Mountain Jam and Townsquare owning Taste of Country. Live Nation subsequently purchased 51% of Mountain Jam and 100% of Taste of Country. Mountain Jam moved to Bethel Woods Center for the Performing Arts in 2019, and was cancelled in 2020 due to the corona virus pandemic. In 2025, Chetkof got 100% ownership of Mountain Jam and the festival made a triumphant return at Belleayre Mountain.

In 2010, Radio Woodstock celebrated its 30th anniversary. The station released two volumes of a 30th anniversary CD featuring live recordings from the station's rich history of hosting top talent for in-studio performances, local concerts, and its annual Mountain Jam Festival. Additionally, Radio Woodstock's year-long 30th Anniversary Concert Series featured performances in the Woodstock area by Assembly of Dust, Amos Lee, and The Hold Steady to name a few.

In 2016, Radio Woodstock created the Radio Woodstock Cares Foundation to help raise money for breast cancer research and care in the Hudson Valley. Its Pink October Fundraisers, started in 1998, had become so successful that a 501(c)(3) entity was officially created. Nearly $1 million has been raised over the years via a combination of charity concerts, radio-thons supported by listener donations for song requests, online auctions and a Be a DJ for a Day program. Some of the featured charity concert headliners have included Brandi Carlile, Natalie Merchant, The Indigo Girls, and Michael Franti.

Also in 2016, Radio Woodstock became one of the first listener- and advertiser-supported commercial FM radio stations in the country. The station pledged to reduce the number of commercials it would play each hour, refused advertising from certain large multi-national corporations whose products were inconsistent with its Woodstock brand, and canceled its contract with the Nielsen Ratings Company. Radio Woodstock won a "most innovative station" award from the prestigious Jacobs Media in March 2017. The station continues to add supporters via its website and through two on-air supporter drives each year. Radio Woodstock is estimated to have nearly 1,000 supporters who pledge a minimum of $100.1 per year to help the station stay independent and keep its progressive and eclectic programming, and to receive Member benefits such as exclusive invitations to in-studio concerts and events.
