= WRKI =

Radio station in Brookfield–Danbury, Connecticut

- Brookfield, Connecticut; United States
- Broadcast area: Greater Danbury; Bridgeport-New Haven
- Frequency: 95.1 MHz
- Branding: I-95

Programming
- Format: Classic rock
- Affiliations: Compass Media Networks

Ownership
- Owner: Townsquare Media; (Townsquare License, LLC)
- Sister stations: WDBY

History
- First air date: July 14, 1957
- Former call signs: WGHF (1957–1967); WINE-FM (1967–1977)
- Call sign meaning: Rock, I-95

Technical information
- Licensing authority: FCC
- Facility ID: 15391
- Class: B
- ERP: 29,500 watts
- HAAT: 194 meters (636 ft)
- Transmitter coordinates: 41.4934°N 73.4290°W

Links
- Public license information: Public file; LMS
- Webcast: Listen live
- Website: i95rock.com

WRKI (95.1 FM, "I-95") is a commercial radio station licensed to Brookfield, Connecticut, serving Greater Danbury and Bridgeport-New Haven, Connecticut. The station is owned by Townsquare Media, and carries a classic rock radio format. Its studios and offices are located on Ives Street in Downtown Danbury; the station's transmitter is located on Carmen Hill Road in Brookfield.

== History ==
=== Early years ===
On July 14, 1957, the station signed on as WGHF. It was owned by the Eastern Broadcasting System. Its AM sister station, WINE (940 AM) signed on in 1963 as a simulcast of WGHF. On December 10, 1967, the FM station's call sign was changed to WINE-FM.

WINE-AM-FM aired a popular contemporary format, playing the Top 40 hits of the day. Because WINE was an AM daytimer, required to sign off at sunset, WINE-FM continued the Top 40 sound into the night when AM 940 was off the air.

=== Album rock I-95 ===
WINE-FM stopped simulcasting the AM station at the end of 1976. At 6:00 p.m. on December 24, 1976, it switched to an album-oriented rock format. The first song played was "The Bitch Is Back" by Elton John. On May 11, 1977, WINE-FM changed its call sign to WRKI, using the name of a major interstate highway in its listening area, I-95.

The station's original slogan was "Fairfield County's Best Rock". In 1982 the station had a brief detour into modern rock and new wave music as "The Rock of the 80s" but soon returned to its album rock sound. The station has also been known as "The Non-Stop Rock Station", "Connecticut's Best Rock & Roll", "Connecticut's Rock & Roll Favorites", "Real Rock" and "Danbury's Rock Station" but has most consistently been and currently known as "The Home of Rock 'n' Roll".

WRKI and WINE were acquired by Cumulus Media in 2002. Cumulus is one of the largest owners of radio stations in the U.S.

=== Townsquare ownership ===
On August 30, 2013, a deal was announced in which Townsquare Media would acquire 53 Cumulus Media stations, including WRKI and WINE, for $238 million. The deal was part of Cumulus Media's acquisition of Dial Global. Townsquare Media and Dial Global are both controlled by Oaktree Capital Management. The sale to Townsquare Media was completed on November 14, 2013.

Upon Townsquare taking control of WRKI, the new owner moved the station to classic rock. Unlike several Townsquare radio stations, WRKI kept most of the station's local disc jockeys.
