= Bruce Morrow =

American radio performer (born 1935)

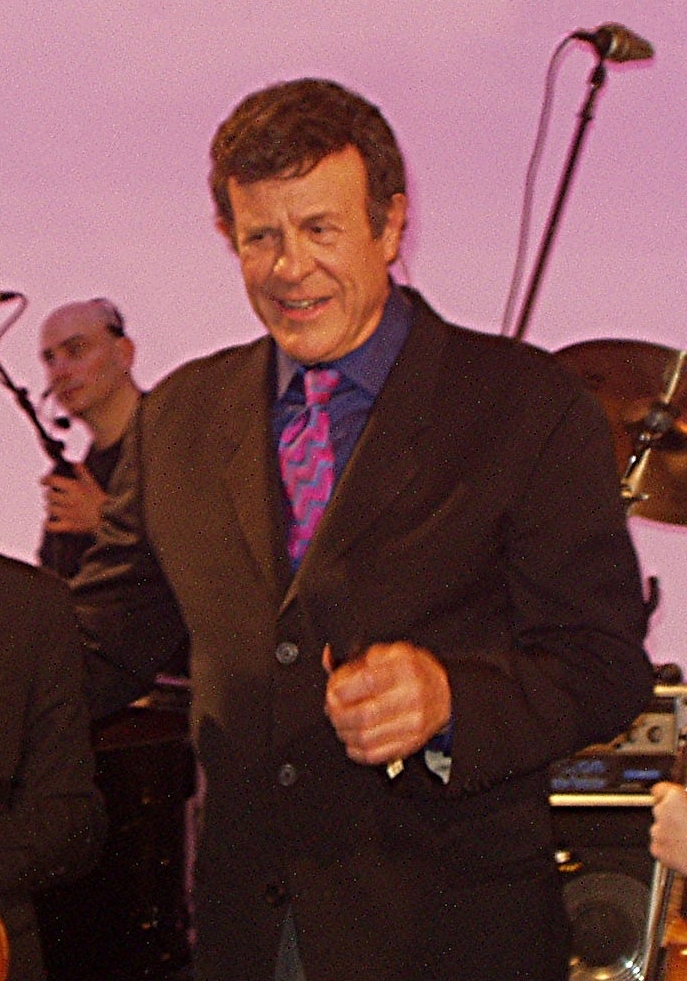
- Morrow in 2003
- Born: Bruce Meyerowitz; October 13, 1935 (age 90); Brooklyn, New York, U.S.
- Occupations: Disc jockey, radio announcer, actor
- Years active: 1959–present
- Spouse: Jodie Berlin (m. 1974)
- Children: 3

Bruce Morrow (born Bruce Meyerowitz; October 13, 1935) is an American radio performer, publicly known as Cousin Brucie or Cousin Bruce Morrow. In an October 2020 interview, Morrow said he received the moniker "Cousin" while in the lobby of his midtown Manhattan WABC studio when an elderly woman once asked him "Cousin, lend me fifty cents to get home" to whom he did give that fifty cents. The name stuck for six decades.

== Early life ==
Morrow was born in New York, New York, the son of Mina and Abe Meyerowitz. Morrow, who is Jewish, was raised in the Sheepshead Bay, Brooklyn neighborhood, where he attended elementary school at P.S. 206. While attending James Madison High School, he was involved with the All City Radio Workshop at Brooklyn Technical High School. Wanting to pursue a radio career, he spent 10 hours a week working for dramatic educational productions at radio station WNYE-FM.

Morrow enrolled as a student at Brooklyn College but transferred to New York University to study in the Communications Arts Program.

== Career ==
=== Radio work ===
Morrow's first stint in radio was in Bermuda at ZBM-AM, where he was known as "The Hammer". He began his career in the US at New York City Top 40 station WINS (AM) in 1959. In 1960, he relocated to Miami, Florida, for a stint at WINZ (AM) before returning to New York the next year for the major station WABC (AM 770), another Top 40 station. Morrow worked for WABC for 13 years and 4,014 broadcasts until August 1974, when he transferred to rival radio station WNBC replacing Wolfman Jack who quit to tour with The Guess Who. After three years there, he quit performance to team with entrepreneur Robert F.X. Sillerman to become the owner of the Sillerman Morrow group of radio stations, which included WALL and WKGL, both in Middletown, New York; WJJB, later WCZX, in Poughkeepsie, New York; WHMP in Northampton, Massachusetts; WOCB in West Yarmouth, Massachusetts; WRAN (later dark) New Jersey 1510 in Randolph, New Jersey and television station WATL Atlanta. The group later purchased WPLR in New Haven, Connecticut.

During 1982, Morrow resumed working as a radio announcer for New York's WCBS-FM, an oldies station. Initially, he filled in for Jack Spector every third Saturday evening for the Saturday Night Sock Hop program. After Spector's resignation in 1985, Morrow became the main performer for the program and renamed it the Saturday Night Dance Party. The station also added his nationally syndicated show Cruisin' America. In 1986, he began working the Wednesday evening shift, when he hosted The Top 15 Yesterday and Today Countdown. In 1991, the Wednesday show became The Yearbook, emphasizing music from the years between 1955 and 1979.

When the radio program Cruisin' America ended in December 1992, Morrow continued hosting a WCBS radio program named Cruising with the Cuz Monday evenings until the end of 1993. After that program ended, he hosted the Saturday night and Wednesday night programs there until the station's change to an adult hits format named Jack FM on June 3, 2005. Soon thereafter, he signed a multi-year deal to host oldies programming and a weekly talk program for Sirius Satellite Radio and for 15 years from 2005 to 2020, hosted programs for SiriusXM satellite radio on the '60s on 6 channel. Cousin Brucie's Saturday Night Party – Live was broadcast Saturday nights, while Cruisin' with Cousin Brucie was broadcast on Wednesday nights. On Sunday nights, Best of Brucie, a compilation culled from his SiriusXM broadcasts, aired. His crew included at various points former senior producers Adam Saltzman, Lauren Hornek, Emilio Medugno and producer Colton Murray. On his Wednesday, July 29, 2020, program, he announced he was leaving SiriusXM following that Saturday's broadcast, characterizing it as not a retirement.

Days later, it was announced that Cousin Brucie would be returning to WABC in New York City, where he was previously a DJ from 1961 to 1974. The station was reviving its previous 'Music Radio 77 WABC" format for Saturday evenings with the otherwise all-talk station airing Cousin Brucie’s Saturday Night Rock & Roll Party weekly from 6pm to 10pm, beginning September 5, 2020. The program was described as featuring music from the 1950s and 1960s and "a good touch" of the 1970s. WABC placed the show into syndication in 2025.

=== Film and television ===
Morrow's voice can be heard in the movies Across the Universe, Gas Pump Girls, and Dirty Dancing; he also had a minor part in the latter, playing a magician who saws Baby (Jennifer Grey) in half, and served as period music consultant. He can be seen making on stage introductory remarks for the 1966 documentary The Beatles at Shea Stadium. He also appeared in the 1978 movie Sgt. Pepper's Lonely Hearts Club Band and had a guest appearance in the 1990s science fiction television series Babylon 5 [in "War Without End" (Part 2), playing the first officer of Babylon 4]. In Across the Universe, the radio station call letters he used were WEAF which were the call letters of 660 in New York before it became WNBC. He also played a television contest announcer in Between Time and Timbuktu, a 1972 National Educational Television production adapted from several short stories by Kurt Vonnegut.

=== Charity work ===
Morrow has worked for the Variety Children's Charity (for which he served as president for ten years) to help fund children who are disadvantaged, physically challenged, sick or needy and he volunteers with Gatewave Audio Reading Service for people who are blind or visually impaired. and WhyHunger (which in 1975, was founded by Morrow's close friend, the late singer-songwriter, Harry Chapin).

== Personal life ==
In December 1974, the divorced Morrow married Jodie Berlin, at the time the corporate manager of executive development and internal placements for the department-store chain Alexander's. Morrow has three adult children: Jon, a doctor; Paige, a director; and Meridith, a former TV news anchor. He also has two grandchildren.

== Honors ==
Morrow was inducted into the National Radio Hall of Fame in 1988, and the National Association of Broadcasters Hall of Fame in the radio division in 2001. In 2010, he received the Bravery In Radio Award from William Paterson University and its radio station WPSC 88.7 FM, for a track record of "inspirational radio programming and lifelong commitment to the medium of radio". Born in Brooklyn, part of geographical Long Island, he was inducted into the Long Island Music Hall of Fame in 2018. In 1994, the city designated West 52nd Street (where the headquarters of former WCBS-FM parent CBS are located) as Cousin Brucie Way.

== Books ==
- Cousin Brucie: My Life in Rock 'N' Roll Radio (1987).
- Doo Wop: The Music, the Times, the Era (published November 1, 2007).
- Rock & Roll:...And the Beat Goes On (published October 1, 2009) ISBN 0-9823064-3-1.
