= WHVW =

- Hyde Park, New York; United States
- Broadcast area: Mid-Hudson Valley
- Frequency: 950 kHz
- Branding: 950 AM WHVW

Programming
- Format: Variety (Americana, blues, country, standards and oldies)

Ownership
- Owner: J.P. Ferraro

History
- First air date: July 4, 1963; 62 years ago
- Former call signs: WHVW (1963–1976); WHPN (1976–1979); WWWI (1979–1982)
- Call sign meaning: Hudson Valley

Technical information
- Licensing authority: FCC
- Facility ID: 41870
- Class: D
- Power: 500 watts (day); 57 watts (night)
- Transmitter coordinates: 41°44′46.34″N 73°54′44.49″W
- Translator: 96.5 W243EI (Hyde Park)

Links
- Public license information: Public file; LMS

WHVW (950 AM) is a commercial radio station licensed to Hyde Park, New York. It airs an eclectic format based on Americana music, pop hits, classic country, adult standards, blues and oldies. It is independently owned by J.P. Ferraro, with studios in Poughkeepsie, New York.

By day, WHVW is powered at 500 watts non-directional. To protect other stations on 950 AM from interference at night, it reduces power to 57 watts at sunset, also non-directional. Its transmitter tower is off Route 9G in the Town of Hyde Park. Programming is also heard on 250-watt FM translator W243EI at 96.5 MHz in Hyde Park.

== History ==
Originally owned by Ubiquitous Corp., WHVW signed on the air on July 4, 1963. It was a daytime-only station broadcasting from a tower just north of the Poughkeepsie–Hyde Park line. Launching with a Top 40 format that served the Poughkeepsie area, the station became popular and within a few years was the #1 station in town, with over 50% of the radio audience. In 1966, it added an FM outlet. WHVW-FM signed on at 97.7 MHz (now WCZX).

WHVW was sold to Castle Communications Corp in 1975. Despite the fact the Top 40 was still getting good ratings, the new owners made a radical format change to all-news (via NBC's News and Information Service) as WHPN, beginning June 28, 1976, and continuing the format after NBC folded the service the following year. This move reduced the station's audience considerably and in 1978 the format changed again to adult contemporary with the new call letters of WWWI. Positioning itself as a more musical alternative to WKIP, the station struggled to find an audience as the ownership lost money.

In 1982, WWWI's owners filed for bankruptcy and the future of the station was in doubt. While the sale of WJJB (the former WHVW-FM) helped matters, ownership nearly donated WWWI to a Christian group that would later become the genesis of Sound of Life Radio. Instead, the station was sold, the WHVW calls returned, and the station switched to a standards format. For the next decade, WHVW would switch between various oldies and adult standards permutations, often changing its format as a result of a higher-powered, better-funded station coming into competition. WHVW added nighttime service with 57 watts in the mid 1980s. Around the same time, its studios moved to Market Street in Poughkeepsie; in 1989 the station moved back to the original "Broadcast House" on Route 9G in Hyde Park, NY.

More financial problems in 1992 led to WHVW's sale to current owner Joseph-Paul (J.P.) Ferraro, a former pirate radio broadcaster. Noted by some as an eccentric, Ferraro would move the studios back to Poughkeepsie and change the format to something that would share his musical tastes with the community; the eclectic format has attracted media attention (see below) but has struggled to produce much revenue, resulting in the station relying on paid programming. No salaries are paid to any on-air hosts; anyone who can bring advertisers can potentially get on WHVW.

== Programming ==
WHVW's musical library is based mostly on pre-1965 music that was originally issued on 78 rpm records; this music rarely gets airplay anywhere except on some low-powered college or community radio stations. Non-music programming on WHVW includes some weekend religious and ethnic programs, a weekly talk show done with the Poughkeepsie Chamber of Commerce, a high school sports program, a weekly program hosted by Poughkeepsie Journal columnist and former WEOK morning host Larry Hughes, and occasional commentaries from former County Legislator Joel Tyner.

The mystique of WHVW's unique format has produced something of a cult following of the station; though not a factor in its own market and not having been rated in many years, WHVW has been profiled by many publications throughout the northeast including a 2001 piece by The New York Times.

In July 2013, WHVW began broadcasting two hours of programming per week on shortwave station WBCQ, in Monticello, Maine, which is owned by Ferraro's former pirate radio compatriot Allan Weiner.

== Translator ==
Call sign	Frequency	City of license	FID	ERP (W)	Class	Transmitter coordinates	FCC info
W243EI	96.5 FM	Hyde Park, New York	201475	250 horizontal	D	41°53′47″N 73°46′31″W	LMS
