= WRRV =

Coordinates: 41.457°N 74.440°W

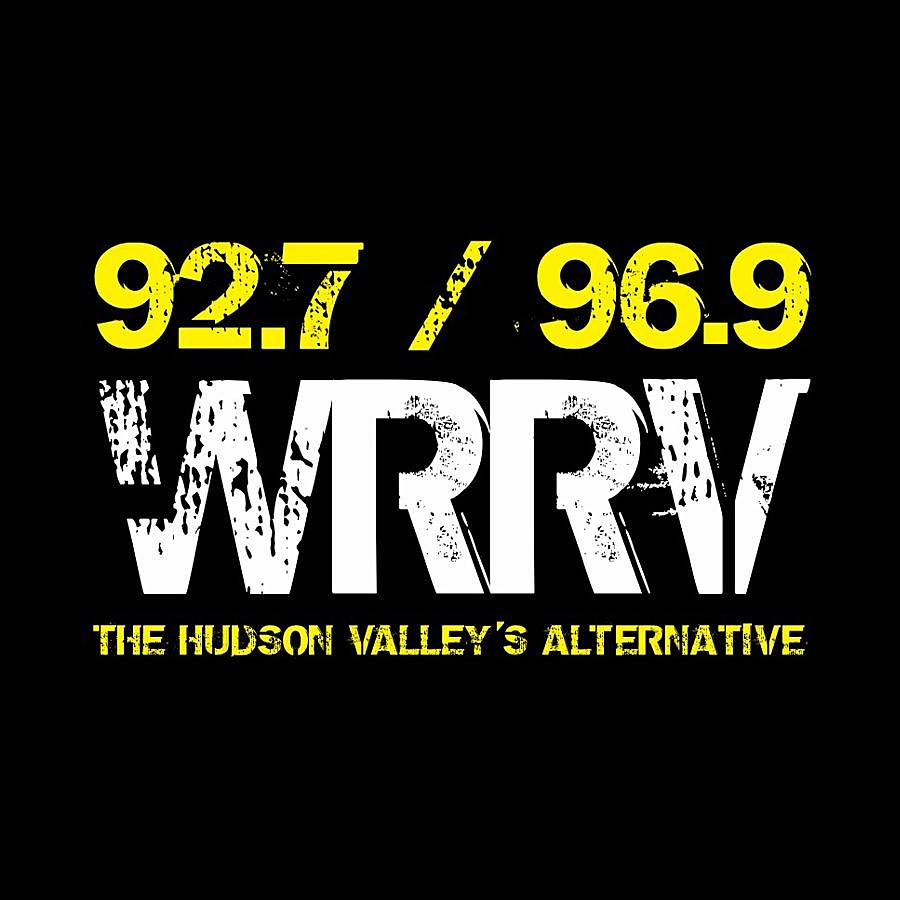
- Middletown, New York; United States
- Broadcast area: Orange County
- Frequency: 92.7 MHz
- Branding: 92.7–96.9 WRRV

Programming
- Format: Alternative rock

Ownership
- Owner: Townsquare Media; (Townsquare License, LLC)
- Sister stations: WCZX; WEOK; WKXP; WPDA; WPDH; WZAD

History
- First air date: 1966; 60 years ago
- Former call signs: WALL-FM (1966–1981); WKGL (1981–1988); WKOJ (1988–1995)
- Call sign meaning: Former "Rock Revolution" format

Technical information
- Licensing authority: FCC
- Facility ID: 3136
- Class: A
- ERP: 6,000 watts
- HAAT: 82 meters (269 ft)
- Repeater: 96.9 WRRB (Arlington)

Links
- Public license information: Public file; LMS
- Webcast: Listen live
- Website: wrrv.com

WRRV (92.7 FM) is a commercial radio station licensed to Middletown, New York, and serving Orange County, including parts of the mid Hudson Valley and Catskill Mountains. The station is owned by Townsquare Media and broadcasts an alternative rock radio format. WRRV's programming is simulcast on WRRB (96.9 FM) in Arlington, New York, which serves the Mid-Hudson Valley, north of WRRV's signal.

WRRV has an effective radiated power (ERP) of 6,000 watts. Its transmitter tower is on the northwest edge of Middletown, off Monhegan Avenue. The studios and offices are in Poughkeepsie, on Pendell Road.

== History ==
=== WALL-FM ===
The station signed on the air in 1966 as WALL-FM, sister station to WALL (1340 AM). It originally had an easy listening format, and later simulcast the popular top 40 format of the AM side.

WALL top 40 alumni include Howard Hoffman (later at KABC in Los Angeles, after serving as WABC's last music disc jockey), Dave Charity, Larry Berger (both at New York City station WPLJ), future game show announcer Randy West in his first on-air job and radio host Jimmy Howes.

The station was sold twice in its first decade of operation, to Oroco Communications in 1971 and Castle Communications Corporation in 1974.

=== WKGL ===
In 1979, WALL-AM-FM were sold to a group headed by New York City disc jockey Bruce Morrow ("Cousin Brucie"). The Middletown Armory became "One Broadcast Plaza", where Robert F. X. Sillerman and Morrow headquartered the Sillerman-Morrow Group, which purchased, operated and then sold radio and television stations around the country at a handsome profit. With Morrow making the programming decisions, 92.7 changed format to an adult contemporary/oldies hybrid as WKGL "92 Karat Gold"; the call letters were adopted in 1981.

Morrow left radio ownership in 1985 and sold WALL and WKGL to Bell Broadcasting. "92 Karat Gold" was replaced by "92rock7", a Top 40/rock hybrid which leaned heavily on modern rock and energetic air personalities around the clock. "92rock7" was well ahead of a late 1980s "Rock 40" radio industry trend and developed a cult following.

=== O&R Ownership ===
Bell Broadcasting fell into financial difficulties from its Sillerman-financed mortgage and sold WKGL and WALL in 1988 to Orange & Rockland Utilities (O&R), the locally based gas and electric provider for much of the station's coverage area and today a unit of Con Edison.

Orange & Rockland eliminated the on air personalities at the station, going with broadcast automation. By 1989, WKGL evolved into "The Orange" with a mainstream rock approach. The new call sign was WKOJ. It featured a rock format without hard rock or outrageous personalities. DJs were mostly limited to reading liner cards and did not talk over any music, production was sparse and the audience skewed toward women, not the traditional male album-oriented rock listener. By 1993, ratings had slipped, and WKOJ fell far behind rival station WPDH.

Orange & Rockland had relied heavily on an outside consultant from the beginning of its venture into broadcasting, as station general managers reported to management in a non-regulated natural gas division. Faced with several underperforming properties, in mid-1993 the utility hired a successful and experienced broadcaster, Don Schwartz, to oversee its radio properties in New York, New Jersey, Maine and Illinois. With new management in place in 1994, WKOJ updated its playlist. It also secured the local rights to rock festival Woodstock '94, jettisoned most pre-1975 titles, added Joe Kelly as the station's voice, built a new morning team around Joe Thomas from WRCN, Long Island. It added production director Chris Rogers and became "Today's Best Rock."

The station's new approach yielded a ratings rebound and a strong showing in the 18-34 demographic. However, O&R was anxious to leave radio ownership amid a management scandal at the parent company. Ownership deregulation brought lucrative offers for the broadcast properties. O&R sold all its radio holdings in 1995. Rather than compete with WKOJ, WPDH owner Rob Dyson's Crystal Radio Group bought WALL and WKOJ. He positioned the FM station to take audience from Top 40 rival WSPK K-104 and simultaneously protect WPDH from an active rock competitor.

=== WRRV ===
Logo used from 1997-2014

On April 3, 1995, at 10:00 a.m., WKOJ's format gave way to "The New Rock Revolution!" It switched its call letters to WRRV (which stand for "rock revolution"). Over time, the new slogan switched to "The New Rock Alternative!" Andrew Boris (who goes by only his last name on the radio) was WRRV's first DJ and hosted the morning show from the format change in 1995, after which he was replaced by Deuce.

Morning co-host Jennifer "Jen" King Coudrey died of sarcoma in June 2009. The station set up the Jennifer Coudrey Scholarship Fund, which helps women pursuing careers in physical therapy. In the summer of 2013, Andrew Boris stepped down as program director of WRRV to focus on his new job as morning drive time host at WPDH.

Andrew was replaced in November 2013 by longtime WRRV music director Billy Dunn. In March 2015, Dunn launched WRRV Sessions, a monthly live music series featuring a rotating cast of national acts like Jimmy Eat World, Switchfoot, Coheed and Cambria and others.

=== Evolutions of WRRV's format ===
At the outset, WRRV's format actually included more classic rock than the station had featured in WKOJ's final year. WRRV's format was an unusual blend of new and classic rock, both heavy metal and new alternative rock. The station gave listeners conflicting signals, featuring Ozzy Osbourne in produced imaging pieces while playing Green Day and Blues Traveler in heavy rotation. In late 1995, “Music All Morning with Boris” took over the morning drive slot. By 1996, the station had dropped their incredible slogan "We Are The New Rock Revolution!" for their newest slogan "We're The Pure Rock Alternative!" as WRRV officially focused exclusively on new alternative rock and the station took off. In June 1997, Crystal bought the 96.9 frequency, which had simulcast WDST into Poughkeepsie, and began a simulcast of WRRV.

In February 1999, WRRV made a quiet but sudden shift to a modern AC-heavy approach; this move was the opposite of the leaning of other stations in the format in a harder direction akin to active rock. At the time, the move seemed curious, but many of the stations that moved in the harder direction ended up changing their format entirely. In time, the station evolved back to a more mainstream alternative sound. In comparison to the format as a whole, WRRV still leans slightly towards some modern pop. Since 1996, following an uneven first year, WRRV's ratings have been successful, regardless of approach, and it is among the higher rated of modern rock stations in the US. The station has been highly successful from a business perspective over that time as well. The station has withstood brief challenges from 96.1 The X in 1996 and from active rock-formatted 92.9 Rock from 2002 through 2004.

=== Changes in ownership ===
Along with the other Crystal stations, WRRV and WRRB were sold to Aurora Communications in October 2000 which, in turn, was bought out a year later by Cumulus Media. WRRV is notable in being only one of two stations (WKNY in Kingston the other) from the Aurora purchase to face no major changes by Cumulus.

On August 30, 2013, a deal was announced in which Cumulus would swap its stations in Dubuque, Iowa, and Poughkeepsie, New York, (including WRRV) to Townsquare Media in exchange for Peak Broadcasting's statiojs in Fresno, California. The deal was part of Cumulus' acquisition of Dial Global; Townsquare, Peak, and Dial Global were all controlled by Oaktree Capital Management. The sale to Townsquare was completed on November 14, 2013.
