= WPDA =

Semi-satellite of WPDH Poughkeepsie
- Jeffersonville, New York; United States
- Broadcast area: Hudson Valley, Catskills, and Extreme Northern New Jersey
- Frequency: 106.1 MHz
- Branding: 101.5 WPDH

Programming
- Format: Classic rock
- Affiliations: Compass Media Networks; Westwood One

Ownership
- Owner: Townsquare Media; (Townsquare License, LLC)
- Sister stations: WCZX, WEOK, WKXP, WPDH, WRRV, WZAD

History
- First air date: 1966 (as WPDA)

Technical information
- Licensing authority: FCC
- Facility ID: 3655
- Class: A
- ERP: 1,600 watts
- HAAT: 191 meters (627 ft)
- Transmitter coordinates: 41°48′57″N 74°45′42″W

Links
- Public license information: Public file; LMS
- Webcast: Listen Live
- Website: wpdh.com

WPDA (106.1 FM) is a radio station broadcasting a classic rock radio format, simulcasting WPDH 101.5 FM Poughkeepsie, New York. Licensed to Jeffersonville, New York, United States, the station is owned by Townsquare Media and features programming from AP Radio. Its studios are in Poughkeepsie, and its transmitter is located in Liberty, New York.

WPDA also breaks away from the format to simulcast New York Yankees games with sister station, country WKXP.

Former logo

On August 30, 2013, a deal was announced in which Cumulus Media would swap its stations in Dubuque, Iowa and Poughkeepsie, New York (including WPDA) to Townsquare Media in exchange for Peak Broadcasting's Fresno, California stations. The deal is part of Cumulus' acquisition of Dial Global; Townsquare, Peak, and Dial Global are all controlled by Oaktree Capital Management. The sale to Townsquare was completed on November 14, 2013.

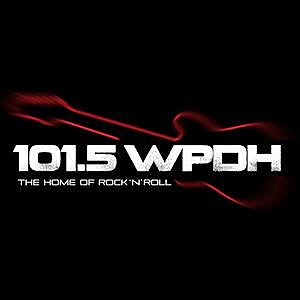
Previous logo

== Cultural references ==
A radio station with call sign WPDA "in Cedarburg, New Jersey" is mentioned in an episode of The Twilight Zone (Season 2, Episode 20, "Static"), although this episode predates the launch of the real-life station.

== See also ==
- WPDH
