= WENT =

- Gloversville, New York; United States
- Broadcast area: Mohawk Valley
- Frequency: 1340 kHz

Programming
- Format: Full Service Adult Contemporary
- Affiliations: NBC News Radio; New York Yankees Radio Network

Ownership
- Owner: Michael Schaus; (Thnk Tank Media, Inc.)

History
- First air date: 1944; 82 years ago

Technical information
- Licensing authority: FCC
- Facility ID: 72291
- Class: C
- Power: 1,000 watts (unlimited)
- Transmitter coordinates: 43°1′30″N 74°21′10″W
- Translator: 105.1 W286CD (Gloversville)

Links
- Public license information: Public file; LMS
- Webcast: Listen Live
- Website: wentradio.com

WENT (1340 AM) is a commercial radio station broadcasting a Full Service Adult Contemporary radio format, with a heavy emphasis on local news, weather and sports information. Licensed to Gloversville, New York, the station primarily serves the Fulton & Montgomery County portion of New York's Mohawk Valley. It is owned by Michael Schaus. WENT carries New York Yankees baseball games and weekly NFL games, as well as high school football and basketball. World and national news is covered by NBC News Radio.

WENT is powered at 1,000 watts, non-directional. It also operates FM translator W286CD at 105.1 MHz, co-located at the WENT AM broadcast facility.

== History ==
WENT signed on the air in 1944. It broadcast at 250 watts and was owned by the Sacandaga Broadcasting Company at 8 West Fulton Street. It was a network affiliate of CBS Radio and the Mutual Broadcasting System. It carried their dramas, comedies, news, sports, soap operas, game shows and big band broadcasts during the "Golden Age of Radio."

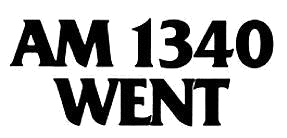
Former logo

In 2013, it added an FM translator, 105.1 W286CD.
