= Robert F. X. Sillerman =

American businessman (1948–2019)

- Born: Robert Francis Xavier Sillerman; April 12, 1948; Manhattan, New York City, US
- Died: November 24, 2019 (aged 71)
- Education: Brandeis University
- Occupation: Business executive
- Years active: 1966–2019
- Spouse: Laura Baudo

Robert Francis Xavier Sillerman (April 12, 1948 – November 24, 2019) was an American businessman and media entrepreneur. Sillerman was the owner of a range of television and radio stations during the 1970s and 1980s. In 1993, he formed SFX Broadcasting. He then built SFX Entertainment—a concert and stage performance promoter that was sold to Clear Channel in 2000 for $4.4 billion. He refounded SFX Entertainment in 2012 as a promoter of electronic music festivals; that company is now known as LiveStyle. He was also the founder of Viggle and the namesake of The Sillerman Center for the Advancement of Philanthropy at Brandeis University. Once on the Forbes 400 list, he also briefly owned the WLAF's New York/New Jersey Knights.

== Early life and education ==
Sillerman was born to a Jewish family in New York City, and he was raised in the Riverdale neighborhood of the Bronx, the son of Estelle (Levande) and Michael McKinley Sillerman. His father founded the Keystone Radio Network. After graduating from the Collegiate School, he attended Brandeis University. By day he majored in political science, while by night in 1966 he launched Youth Market Consultants, offering fellow students discount magazine subscriptions while advising marketers on how to target the teen set. He sold the company in 1971, and he then launched I P+E, a sales marketing and promotion company. He sold the company in 1972 to the Boston ad firm, Ingalls. Sillerman was married to copywriter Laura Baudo, whom he met at Ingalls.

== Radio and SFX ==
In 1978, Sillerman and disc jockey Bruce Morrow bought two radio stations in upstate New York for $1.875 million. They acquired additional radio and TV stations, including WALL and WKGL (Middletown, New York); WJJB (Hyde Park, New York); WHMP (Northampton, Massachusetts); WLOM (Orleans, Massachusetts); WRAN (Randolph, New Jersey); WPLR (New Haven, Connecticut) and the television station WATL (Atlanta). In 1985 Sillerman entered into a partnership with radio/television industry executive Carl E. Hirsch (known as Legacy Broadcasting) to acquire KJOI-FM, Los Angeles for a then record-setting $44 million, as well as other stations in Denver, Detroit, Minneapolis, Washington D.C., Houston, Philadelphia, Los Angeles and New York City. The company was merged at the end of 1989 with a unit of Westinghouse Broadcasting in a then record-setting transaction worth $727 million.

In 1989 Sillerman formed Capstar Communications. Capstar applied for and received permission to operate more than one class of radio station in the same market. This ultimately led to the Telecommunications Act of 1996 allowing for ownership of multiple stations in single markets Capstar merged with Command Communications, another radio group Sillerman founded, ultimately changing its name to SFX Broadcasting. SFX bought up enough stations to become the nation's seventh largest chain. SFX Broadcasting sold its 71 radio stations for $2.1 billion in 1998. In the sale, SFX kept two small concert promoters, and renamed the company SFX Entertainment (concert promotion, sports agencies), turning SFX Entertainment into the world's largest producer, promoter and presenter of live entertainment. He sold the company SFX Entertainment to Clear Channel for $4.4 billion in 2000. He also made money on Broadway as an executive producer for Mel Brooks' musical The Producers.

== CKX ==
Leading CKX, Inc., Sillerman bought majority rights to Graceland, the Elvis Presley estate, as well as the assets of Simon Fuller's 19 Entertainment, whose assets include TV hit American Idol and managed clients including football player David Beckham. The company also held a stake in Morra, Brezner, Steinberg & Tenenbaum Entertainment, the management company for Woody Allen, Robin Williams and Billy Crystal. The company also acquired 80% in Muhammad Ali Enterprises. In 2011, Apollo Management purchased CKX in 2011 for $512 million.

== Flag Luxury Properties ==
In May 2009, Credit Suisse filed a request for summary judgment in New York State Supreme Court, alleging Sillerman had failed to pay the outstanding balance due under a credit agreement with Flag Luxury Properties LLC and that Sillerman defaulted on a series of payments due since April 2008, totaling $21.4 million. In a July 2009 interview with the New York Post, Sillerman admitted failure, stating with reference to the Flag project: "I'm not very knowledgeable about real estate."

== Viggle ==
On February 8, 2011, Sillerman announced an agreement to acquire control of Gateway Industries, Inc. (GWAY.PK). The transaction renamed the company to Function (X), Inc. and changing its listing on the stock exchange to FNCX. The first product the company produced was called "Viggle", released in January 2012, which used a mobile app as its primary interface. Viggle registers the television show a person is watching, and engages the users with a loyalty program for viewing particular programs. Early rewards included gift cards to retail establishments. The app will also display the social media activity for other shows at the same time, along with what rewards are available for changing the channel to competing programs. On Jun 7, 2012, Function (X), Inc. was renamed Viggle, which changed the company stock listing to VGGL. As of the end of 2013, Viggle had about 3.7 million users. In December 2013, Viggle acquired Wetpaint for $30 million in stock, and in early 2014 Viggle acquired Digit Media, an entertainment app producer. Its main app, NextGuide and Digit Reminder Button, was integrated into Viggle software. As of December 2013, Viggle companies had a combined 17 million monthly users. In July 2015, Viggle had more than 9.5 million registered users across all properties, up from 5.4 million registered users at the end of 2014.

In May 2012, Sillerman was accused of sexual harassment by an employee of Function X. The dispute was settled out of court for an undisclosed amount. In February 2014, a lawsuit was filed against Sillerman, for allegedly having defrauded a trio of business partners. The suit alleges that Sillerman, in emails, promised a joint partnership in which the plaintiffs would receive 2.5 million "founders shares" of SFX, which never materialized.

== SFX Entertainment ==
In 2012, Sillerman rebooted SFX Entertainment, this time with a focus on the electronic dance music industry. The company acquired various promoters and electronic music festivals, as well as related companies in digital (including Beatport—an electronic music store, online ticketing provider Paylogic, and web development agency Fame House).

On October 9, 2013, SFX went public on the Nasdaq. Defaulting on a $10.8 million loan after missing an interest payment of $3 million in January 2016, the company filed for Chapter 11 bankruptcy on February 1, 2016. In December, the company went private and was renamed LiveStyle, with Sillerman exiting the company in favor of former AEG Live executive Randy Phillips as CEO.

In an interview with Billboard, Sillerman admitted that there were "no easy answers" surrounding why the company collapsed, but added that he didn't "begrudge the disappointment and anger" of his staff because he was just as disappointed over the company's performance. Former employees also interviewed by Billboard felt that the company did not do enough to leverage its scale, and that the company did not engage in centralization, leading to a lack of coordination between its collection of subsidiaries.

== Entrepreneurship ==
From 1993 Sillerman served as the Chancellor of the Southampton College of Long Island University, replacing Angier Biddle Duke. Sillerman took the job on two conditions: that the college scrap ill-defined programs and focus on marine science and creative writing and that he be allowed to handle publicity. In that spirit, he named Kermit the Frog as the 1996 commencement speaker: 31 newspapers picked up the story, a free marketing bonanza that raised the college's profile and drew hundreds of new admissions. In 2000, Sillerman donated a $15 million gift through the Tomorrow Foundation to extend the library and for marine science scholarships.

== Philanthropy ==
In 2008, Sillerman donated $10 million in order to fund The Sillerman Center for the Advancement of Philanthropy at Brandeis University. At the time it was the largest gift ever received by an alumnus to the university. For thirteen years, Sillerman served as the Chancellor of Southampton College and is the founder of The Tomorrow Foundation. Sillerman was also a donor and fundraiser for the Democratic Party in the United States.

== Death ==
On November 24, 2019, Sillerman died at the age of 71 after a respiratory illness.
