= Van Ritshie =

American voice-over artist and radio host

- Born: April 26, 1944; Astoria, Queens, New York, U.S.
- Died: November 3, 2024 (aged 80); Poughkeepsie, New York, U.S.
- Education: Queensborough Community College
- Occupations: Radio personality, voice-over artist
- Years active: 1960s–2024
- Children: 3

Van Ritshie (April 26, 1944 – November 3, 2024) was an American voice-over artist and radio host.

== Early life and education ==
Van Ritshie was born on April 26, 1944, in the Astoria neighborhood of Queens, New York. Ritshie was "a longtime Poughkeepsie resident." He has one brother.

In 1962, Ritshie graduated from Queensborough Community College with a communications degree.

== Career ==
=== Voicework ===
Beginning in January 1995, Ritshie voiced the announcements for the Long Island Rail Road and Metro-North Railroad. His voice can be heard on the C3 and M7 cars on the LIRR, and the M7A and M8 railcars on Metro-North. Additionally, he voices Shore Line East announcements following the transition to electric service on that line.

Ritshie provided voice over for "Earthquake: The Big One", a ride at Universal Studios Florida which opened in 1990 and remained in operation until 2002.

Between 2005 and 2008, Ritshie was the official image voice for the Golf Channel's coverage of the PGA Tour.

=== Radio ===
Ritshie was a radio DJ in the Poughkeepsie area for almost 30 years. He worked at WRNQ as their morning show host from 1989 to 2004 and at WGNY from 2009 to 2017. In March 2017, he began hosting the morning show at WALL in Middletown, Orange County.

== Personal life and death ==
Ritshie was an avid golfer and skier and gave singing lessons.

Ritshie died on November 3, 2024, in Poughkeepsie following a brief illness at the age of 80. He was survived by his wife of 44 years, Barbara, their three children, four grandchildren, and four great-grandchildren.
