= WCZX =

Coordinates: 41.720°N 73.995°W

Simulcast of WZAD, Wurtsboro
- Hyde Park, New York; United States
- Broadcast area: Poughkeepsie, New York
- Frequency: 97.7 MHz
- Branding: The Wolf

Programming
- Format: Country music
- Affiliations: Compass Media Networks

Ownership
- Owner: Townsquare Media; (Townsquare License, LLC)
- Sister stations: WEOK; WKXP; WPDA; WPDH; WRRV; WZAD

History
- First air date: 1966
- Former call signs: WHVW-FM (1966–1976); WHVS (1976–1978); WJJB (1978–1987)
- Call sign meaning: Phonetic spelling of "Classics" (former slogan)

Technical information
- Licensing authority: FCC
- Facility ID: 4587
- Class: A
- ERP: 300 watts
- HAAT: 314 meters (1,030 ft)

Links
- Public license information: Public file; LMS
- Webcast: Listen live
- Website: hudsonvalleycountry.com

WCZX (97.7 FM) is a radio station licensed to Hyde Park, New York, and serving the Mid-Hudson Valley of New York state. The station is owned by Townsquare Media and broadcasts at 300 watts ERP from the Illinois Mountain master tower in Marlborough, New York, with studios on Pendell Road in the Town of Poughkeepsie. It plays a country music format, which is simulcast on two other stations in the Hudson Valley, 97.3 WZAD in Wurtsboro and 105.5 WDBY in Patterson.

== History ==
=== Early years ===
The 97.7 frequency first signed on in 1969 as WHVW-FM, sister station to WHVW (then a Top 40 station that was No. 1 in the Poughkeepsie market). For the first several years of its existence, it simulcasted WHVW's Top 40 programming during that station's operating hours and aired automated easy listening music during the nighttime hours when WHVW was not on the air.

This format would remain until 1976 when WHVS evolved to Soft Adult Contemporary, a format which two years later would be replaced by an automated Top 40 format as WJJB, "Jib 98".

When the owners of WHVW and WJJB went bankrupt in 1982, WJJB was sold to the Sillerman-Morrow Group, a Middletown-based partnership headed by investor Robert F.X. Sillerman and New York City radio legend Bruce Morrow ("Cousin Brucie"). The Morrow half of the group would take over programming of the station and relaunched it as 98 Fame, a CHR/oldies hybrid (listing as a mainstream adult contemporary). A mild ratings success (part out of Morrow, widely known in the market, doing a regular weekend show), the format would last until March 1988 when the Sillerman/Morrow partnership was dissolved.

Under new ownership led by Harry Gregor, the former general manager for the Sillerman Morrow Group, the 98 Fame format was tweaked to a classic hits approach under the new calls WCZX and the name being modified to "'CZX Classic Hits". With former WKIP News Director Ron Lyon programming the station, it successfully evolved to oldies as "97-7 'CZX". In 1989, as the Hudson Valley Market recoiled under the IBM downsizing (39,000 employees from the Hudson Valley were 'early retired' or transferred), revenues fell dramatically, and the loan called in by Barclays Business Credit. After months of negotiations, Gregor filed for bankruptcy, and the station was sold to locally-based Beehive Entertainment which picked up many personalities formerly of WEOK which had previously been the oldies station in the market.

=== Oldies 97.7 (97.3)/Oldies 97 ===
In 1993, the Crystal Radio Group (owners of WPDH and WEOK) began controlling WCZX via a local marketing agreement. With this change came a modified name "(Oldies 97.7)" and a move into the recently upgraded WPDH/WEOK studios (reuniting much of the staff) and ended the last vestiges of automated programming at the station. Crystal would purchase WCZX outright in 1995 and in February 1996 would purchase 97.3 WZAD in Wurtsboro (which had been a locally run oldies station) and combine its operations with WCZX with some of its personalities being retained. The simulcast would rebrand itself as "Oldies 97-7/Oldies 97-3". The expanded station also would reach the Port Jervis/Middletown area plus reaching Sussex County, New Jersey, and Pike County, Pennsylvania.

The air personalities during this period included "Mitchell In The Morning" with Marty Mitchell (who would later become Program Director and afternoon host at WYNY in NYC and on-air at the legendary WCBS FM). After Mitchell left, Bob Miller was promoted from weekends to mornings with Program Director and morning sidekick Brian Jones (now News Director for Pamal Broadcasting and is a regular news anchor on WHUD, midday host Beth Christy (previously of WRWD, now Program Director at WKXP), PM drive host Randy Turner (preceded by "Cadillac" Kelley), night host Nick Robbins, and Marty Allen on overnights. Weekend talent included Bob Reynolds, Samantha Campbell (who would later move on to WXKP and sister station WRRV using the air name of Brandi Hunter), Scotty Newman, Ken Elder (host of "The All Request Saturday Night Oldies Party") and Rick McCafferey (host of the "Solid Gold Jukebox" on Friday nights, formerly of WEOK and WKIP, a show focused on pre-1964 music).

1999 saw some subtle changes at the station, with the moniker being simplified to Oldies 97, Jones becoming news director for the cluster, and Freddie Coleman (now of ESPN Radio) taking over as program director. The playlist was tweaked to an end date of 1979 with some 1980s music by relevant artists. This approach would last through the sale of Crystal Radio to Aurora Communications in 2000.

=== MIX/NOW 97-7 ===
When Aurora Communications was purchased by Cumulus Media in fall of 2001, the effect of the potential of new ownership was felt prior to actual takeover when Aurora refused to fill the vacant overnight air position at Oldies 97. Though minor, this change would be foreshadowing for future changes.

Chuck Benfer, a former Crystal/Aurora executive promoted to general manager by Cumulus to operate the Hudson Valley and Danbury clusters, saw the oldies format as being beyond its time and began to move the station to an adult contemporary format. In the spring of 2002, Oldies 97 phased out most pre-1964 music outside of special programming and began adding late-1970s to early-1980s material. The pre 1964 material was completely gone by the summer of 2002 and the station began to call themselves "Oldies 97 - The Hudson valley's Best Music Mix". By then the station now played music spanning from 1964 to 1989. To kick off Labor Day weekend that year, Oldies 97 relaunched as Mix 97. Initially, the music stayed the same playing only music from the 1964-1989 timeframe. The next month, WAXB in the Danbury area would follow suit and would drop oldies. In the winter of 2003, Mix 97 added big hits from the 1990s and shifted focus of the station to the 1970s and 1980s. Cumulus had acquired the LMA of Concord Media's WBPM from Clear Channel Communications at the same time. That station had been satellite oldies as "Cool 94.3". The Oldies format was kept initially (focusing on the 1964-1969 time period mixed in with 1955-1964 oldies as well as 1970-1972 oldies) and Nick Robbins, Rick McCaffery's Solid Gold Jukebox, and several other Mix 97 personalities moved to "Kool 94.3". This station though would be shut down that Fall and would switch to Country. The Kool Staff exited, but Beth Christie would transfer from "Mix 97" to "94.3 Kix".

During the Fall of 2003, Mix 97 added recurrent songs as well as a few current hits. The 1960s music was almost completely gone, but the station now focused on the 1970s, 1980s, and 1990s. In January 2004, the station began to play more current product and evolved into a Mainstream AC leaning toward 1980s and 1990s music. In March of that year, Mix 97 added John Tesh's syndicated nightly program to go against the popular Delilah After Dark program heard on rivals WRNQ and WHUD. Musically, the station is a cross of the two being more upbeat than WRNQ and tighter formatted than WHUD.

The mid-2000s saw other changes with Randy Turner being released in early-2006 only to take a position as Production Director at Pamal Broadcasting in Beacon. In March 2006, WZAD's simulcast with WCZX would be discontinued as they began to simulcast WKXP; with this move came a modification of the on air name to Mix 97-7. Joe Limardi, a Cumulus veteran whose regional work included WDBY in the Danbury area, supplanted Turner as program director in April 2006. Steve Frankenberry replaced Randy as afternoon host. Eventually, Frankenberry took over the program director position as well. Rick Knight then succeeded Frankenberry as PD/afternoons in 2015.

In October 2008, news director and morning show co-host Brian Jones was laid off in a cost-cutting move after 19 years with WCZX; he was picked up one month later by Pamal Broadcasting.

On February 25, 2010, Suzy Garcia and Bob Miller both were laid off due to a change in direction at Mix 97-7. The AC format was upgraded to a Hot AC format playing music from Today along with big hits from the 1990s and 2000s.

On August 30, 2013, a deal was announced in which Cumulus would swap its stations in Dubuque, Iowa and Poughkeepsie, New York (including WCZX) to Townsquare Media in exchange for Peak Broadcasting's Fresno, California stations. The deal was part of Cumulus' acquisition of Dial Global; Townsquare, Peak, and Dial Global were all controlled by Oaktree Capital Management. The sale to Townsquare was completed on November 14, 2013.

On March 9, 2018, WCZX dropped the "Mix 97.7" hot AC format and began stunting with songs that contain the word "Now". Three days later on March 12, 2018, at 7:00 am, WCZX rebranded as "Now 97-7"

=== The Wolf ===
On January 3, 2020, WCZX dropped the hot AC format and announced that it would become part of The Wolf country music simulcast, competing against WRWD-FM/WRWB-FM. On February 26, 2020, WCZX switched from simulcasting WKXP to WZAD due to WKXP changing formats to soft adult contemporary.
