= WALL =

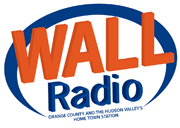
- Middletown, New York; United States
- Broadcast area: Hudson Valley (Orange, Ulster, Dutchess & Sullivan Counties)
- Frequency: 1340 kHz
- Branding: WALL Radio

Programming
- Language: English
- Format: Classic hits
- Affiliations: NBC News Radio; Compass Media Networks

Ownership
- Owner: Neversink Media Group, LLC; (Digital Radio Broadcasting, Inc.)
- Sister stations: WDLC; WYNY

History
- First air date: August 2, 1942

Technical information
- Licensing authority: FCC
- Facility ID: 3137
- Class: C
- Power: 1,000 watts
- Transmitter coordinates: 41°27′25″N 74°26′24″W
- Translators: 96.7 W244EA (Warwick); See also § Translators
- Repeater: 101.5 WPDH-HD2 and HD5 (Poughkeepsie)

Links
- Public license information: Public file; LMS
- Webcast: Listen live
- Website: wallradio.com

WALL (1340 AM) is a commercial radio station licensed to Middletown, New York, and serving Orange County and parts of the Hudson Valley. WALL is owned by Neversink Media Group through licensee Digital Radio Broadcasting, Inc. and broadcasts a classic hits radio format, its studios and offices are in Port Jervis and Middletown.

WALL is powered at 1,000 watts non-directional, broadcasting from a transmitter on Monhagan Avenue in Middletown.

== Early history ==
WALL radio came to air on August 2, 1942, the first radio station in the western part of Orange County, part of a series of low-powered local stations that took to the air in the period after the 1941 North American Regional Broadcasting Agreement and realignment.

WALL signed on with a full-service popular music format with a heavy amount of local news, and with only newspapers as competition, were successful. The station was owned by the Community Broadcasting Corporation whose partners were Roger Clipp, an executive with Triangle Publications (WFIL in Philadelphia) and John Morgan Davis, who ultimately served as Lieutenant Governor of Pennsylvania.

In 1950, WALL hired Jim Patt from WNBH in New Bedford, Massachusetts, as general manager; he ran the station until 1972. On-air personalities included Bill Swanwick ("Breakfast With Beaming Billy"), Jerry Wax ("The Wax Works"), longtime staffer Joe Ryan and Big Jim Pappas; Al Larson served as news director, with Johnny Zaimes in charge of sales.

== Dominance in the 1960s and 1970s ==
The station was sold to R. Peter Straus, owner of WMCA in New York City ("home of the Good Guys"). Straus, who had aspirations to become a United States senator, bought WALL as well as stations in Utica and Geneva, New York, so his editorials could be heard throughout the state. In 1964, however, Robert F. Kennedy decided to run for the Senate, ending Straus's political plans. Patt stayed on to run WALL for Straus, putting WALL-FM on the air, but when Straus sold his stations, Patt decided it was time to retire to Fort Myers, Florida, where he teamed up again with Roger Clipp to put a station on the air in that market.

By the mid-1960s, WALL had evolved into a Middle of the Road format, and on November 11, 1966, would add FM service at 92.7 MHz. It was with the FM launch that WALL switched to Top 40.

In 1968, the station hired program director Larry Berger, who spent the previous two years as music director of WWRL in New York City.

In 1972, Straus Communications sold all their radio properties except WMCA. WALL was bought by Oroco Communications, Inc., headed by James F. O'Grady, Jr., who retained most of the staff and continued the Top 40 format on WALL (AM). Shortly after taking the reins, Oroco decided to split the FM into the "beautiful music" format using an early automation system by Bonneville Program Services. Art Livesey was made program director of the FM. The move was a departure, but WALL-FM would still simulcast the live all-night and morning drive shows on WALL well into the 1970s.

In 1973, Berger was hired by ABC to program their Detroit album-oriented rock station, WRIF, and Dave Pound from New York's WNEW was named WALL's program director. When Berger brought some of WALL's talent with him, Pound brought in newcomers – among them Howard Hoffman, Randy West, Simon Hendrix and John Fischer - to fill the vacancies.

== The "NINE!" satire tape ==
In August 1974, WALL staffers Randy West and Howard Hoffman, along with radio friends Pete Salant and Russ DiBello, recorded a satirical tape known as "NINE!", a parody of industry marketing pitches and radio programming in general. The recording session took place in the WALL production studios after Hoffman's on-air shift ended at midnight. The tape, which takes place at fictional radio station AM 900 WVWA/Pound Ridge, New York, documents the progression of a top 40 station from earlier, awkward years (with odd sound effects, rambling disc jockeys, dead air, and wildly inaccurate weather forecasts) to a finely-tuned, professional-sounding station with various gimmicks, catch-phrases and promotions popular at the time. Ultimately, with help from a consulting firm, WVWA decides to go one step further and strip out all spoken-word content, leaving only a rapid-fire, barely intelligible station identification once an hour and the word "NINE!" screamed between each song. Hoffman and West had heard WWDJ, already imaging themselves as "97-DJ", calling themselves "9-J", and surmised that they would eventually reduce it to just "9", hence the imagined new format. Even before an ending could be added to it, "NINE" immediately turned viral in the entire radio industry when an unfinished copy found its way to New York City's 99X. The creators decided to leave the planned ending off since the payoff stood well on its own.

In the internet era, the satire would take on a life of its own, spawning a website providing WVWA with further backstory, and industry professional Scott Fybush wrote an article about the station as an April Fool's Day gag in 2004. For the 25th anniversary in 1999, a sequel was made by the same team titled "Ninety Nine!", chronicling further exploits of the consulting firm that worked on WVWA, and like its predecessor, taking aim at contemporary broadcasting practices such as voicetracking.

== Fire and aftermath ==
At about 8 p.m. on Sunday, December 21, 1975, WALL suffered a fire which gutted its North Street studios, killing several residents in a third-floor apartment, and forcing the station to move to an abandoned, block-long Armory building in Middletown. WALL was off the air less than half an hour; using remote broadcast equipment that was stored at the transmitter site on Monhagen Avenue, the station began broadcasting from the transmitter building using records borrowed from employees. The old Armory building had already been purchased by Oroco (which changed its name to Castle Communications to commemorate the acquisition), with the intent of moving the radio station there within a year; instead, the move happened overnight. WALL signed on from the Armory at 6 o'clock the morning after the fire, using remote equipment borrowed from sister station WHVW in Hyde Park, New York. Temporary studios were quickly constructed in a basement gym, with permanent studios constructed as originally planned on the second floor of the Armory, and offices on the first floor.

In 1979, WALL and sister WKGL (the former WALL-FM) were purchased by a consortium headed by media mogul Robert F.X. Sillerman and New York air personality Bruce Morrow ("Cousin Brucie"). Headquartering their group in Middletown at the Armory (now re-christened "One Broadcast Plaza"), major changes took place with WALL flipping first to a top 40/adult contemporary hybrid format, and later to Adult standards; WKGL went to an oldies format and then to top 40 format. In 1984, Sillerman and Morrow sold WALL and WKGL to long time employee Dick Bell's Bell Broadcasting Company for 10.4 million dollars (This sale included WJJB, 97.7 Hyde Park, NY and WRAN, Dover, NJ.

== 1980s and 1990s ==
By 1985 WALL began to regroup by bringing in program director Rob Dillman and flipping to a higher-energy oldies format. With this change came the acquisition of sports programming such as New York Mets baseball, New York Giants football, and various local sports and other community events. Additionally, WALL rehired some of the air talent from its top 40 heyday, including Joe Ryan.

In the WALL's "45th Anniversary Reunion Broadcast", on the weekend of August 2–3, 1987, the station looked back to its past and reunited air personalities including "Cousin Brucie", Howard Hoffman, Dave Charity, John Fisher, Ray Arthur, Randy West, Gene Pelc, Al Faust, Art Livesay, Alex Miller, Dick Wells, Jim Frey, Chris Rogers, Jim Brownold, Jon LeMieux, Jimmy Howes, Matt Paulson (Bruno), Jim Pappas, Al Larson and present owner Bud Williamson..

In September 1988 due to lacklustre financial performance of the group, a subsidiary of local power company Orange and Rockland Utilities, (which had financed Dick Bell in 1984), converted its preferred stock to common stock, essentially taking control of the stations. With this transaction new leadership was put in place and a number of employees were purged as the stations brought in a programming consultant and was one of the first to use a computer based music scheduler. WKGL became WKOJ and took on a rock format.

In 1994, Orange and Rockland took some heat for the subsidiaries it owned, and the result was the divestiture of the radio stations. It was announced that the stations would be sold to the highest bidders. At this time WALL and WKOJ went to the Poughkeepsie-based Crystal Radio Group, Rob Dyson's company that also owned WEOK and WPDH. WALL's news-talk format continued undisturbed for most of the rest of the 1990s. WKOJ's format was changed to modern rock and its calls to WRRV, and it continues in the format today.

== WEOK simulcast history ==
While WALL was left alone and did moderately well given its signal and status in the market, Crystal Radio had problems with WEOK given the aging demographics of that station's longtime adult standards format. Looking at an opportunity to fortify their holdings, in August 1999 Crystal decided to join WEOK with WALL and renovate WALL's talk format into a station that would target all of the Hudson Valley. On September 6, 1999, WEOK dumped pop standards and joined with WALL to simulcast talk, a format known as NewsTalk 13. John Moultrie, WALL's morning man since switching to talk, was dumped in favor of WEOK's Larry Hughes. (Moultrie later turned up doing afternoons on WTBQ; and mornings at WVOS-FM.)

Up against the highly rated WABC in New York (and sharing much of its programming), the NewsTalk 13 simulcast struggled to find an audience, especially in Middletown; many listeners there thought the new station was too "Poughkeepsie-centric". In August 2000, the ESPN Radio programming that the station aired nights and weekends became the full-time format of the station. Soon, Aurora Communications would purchase the assets of the Crystal Radio Group. Both NewsTalk 13 and the ESPN Radio simulcast featured a large amount of sports rights including Yankees baseball, Giants and Jets football, and Marist College basketball.

Aurora's ownership of the station would prove to be short-lived; in October 2001 they were purchased by Cumulus Media. At 2 pm on September 15, 2002 (following the rueful announcement "This was ESPN Radio"), WALL and WEOK flipped to a Spanish language Hot AC format as El Ritmo ("The Rhythm"), the first Spanish-language station in the Hudson Valley.

Poor ratings and revenues led Cumulus, in March 2005, to flip the stations again, this time to Radio Disney; Cumulus had actually considered switching to Disney three years earlier.

== True Oldies Channel and return to live radio ==
On February 21, 2010, the WEOK and WALL simulcast dropped Radio Disney, and after stunting with Surfin' Bird by The Trashmen for a day, began airing Scott Shannon's The True Oldies Channel on February 22, a syndicated format similar to the top-40 WALL of the 1960s and 70s (and the high-energy oldies format of the mid-80s). With the switch, WEOK and WALL stopped being a true simulcast, running liners, jingles and commercials specific to each station.

On April 11, 2011, former WALL personality Mark West brought live radio back to Middletown for the first time since 1999 when he began programming a local morning show from his studio in New Hampton, New York. West leased the morning shift (6–10 a.m. weekdays) from Townsquare Media and sold commercials and covered local news.

== Ownership under Townsquare Media ==
On August 30, 2013, a deal was announced in which Cumulus would swap its stations in Dubuque, Iowa, and Poughkeepsie, New York, (including WALL) to Townsquare Media in exchange for Peak Broadcasting's stations in Fresno, California. The deal was part of Cumulus' acquisition of Dial Global; Townsquare, Peak, and Dial Global were all controlled by Oaktree Capital Management. The sale to Townsquare was completed on November 14, 2013.

On January 8, 2015, WALL changed its format to regional Mexican, branded as "Fierro". Mark West's brokered program in English continued, on a month-by-month basis, until May 8. It was during this time that Bud Williamson negotiated a deal to acquire WALL with the intent of keeping Mark west on in the morning.

Effective October 30, 2015, WALL was sold to Bud Williamson's Digital Radio Broadcasting, Inc., in exchange for the license of translator W239AC.

On November 9, 2015, WALL changed its format to classic hits and started broadcasting on 105.7, 94.1, 94.9, 96.7, 106.5 and WPDH-HD2. The station added local air talent back on the air, including Kate Brannan, Jim Frey, Hank Gross, Van Ritshie (d. 2024) and Jimmy Howes. In 2022, Mark Bolger joined WALL for the weekends and returned to radio after four years.

== Translators ==
Broadcast translators for WPDH-HD2
Call sign	Frequency	City of license	FID	ERP (W)	HAAT	Class	Transmitter coordinates	FCC info
W231BP	94.1 FM	Chester, New York	156189	250	285 m (935 ft)	D	41°22′42.00″N 74°8′16.00″W	LMS
W289BE	105.7 FM	Ellenville, New York	144608	99	458 m (1,503 ft)	D	41°41′1.00″N 74°21′24.00″W	LMS
W235BI	94.9 FM	Middletown, New York	46501	155	28 m (92 ft)	D	41°27′16.00″N 74°25′6.00″W	LMS
W293AE	106.5 FM	Newburgh, New York	51925	10	284 m (932 ft)	D	41°29′19.70″N 73°56′53.00″W	LMS
W292CM	106.3 FM	Poughkeepsie, New York	88017	58	208 m (682 ft)	D	41°50′27.50″N 73°59′25.40″W	LMS
W244EA	96.7 FM	Warwick, New York	201478	135	15 m (49 ft)	D	41°22′42″N 74°08′14″W	LMS
