= WEOK =

Spanish-language adult hits radio station in Poughkeepsie, New York

- Poughkeepsie, New York; United States
- Broadcast area: Mid-Hudson
- Frequency: 1390 kHz
- Branding: Juan 95.7

Programming
- Language: Spanish
- Format: Adult hits

Ownership
- Owner: Townsquare Media; (Townsquare License, LLC)
- Sister stations: WALL; WCZX; WKNY; WKXP; WPDA; WPDH; WRRV; WZAD

History
- First air date: October 16, 1949

Technical information
- Licensing authority: FCC
- Facility ID: 71513
- Class: D
- Power: 5,000 watts (day); 106 watts (night)
- Transmitter coordinates: 41°43′14″N 73°54′29″W
- Translator: See § Translators
- Repeater: 101.5 WPDH-HD3 (Poughkeepsie)

Links
- Public license information: Public file; LMS
- Webcast: Listen live
- Website: juanhudsonvalley.com

WEOK (1390 AM) is a commercial radio station licensed to Poughkeepsie, New York and serving the Mid-Hudson Valley. The station is owned by Townsquare Media and airs a Spanish adult hits format, known as "Juan 95.7".

By day, WEOK is powered at 5,000 watts. But to protect other stations on 1390 AM at night, it reduces power to 106 watts at sunset, using a directional antenna at all times. The transmitter is adjacent to the Townsquare complex on Pendell Road in the Town of Poughkeepsie. It uses a two-tower array. Programming is also heard on two FM translators, both at 95.7 MHz, one in Poughkeepsie and one in Middletown.

== History to 1999 ==
WEOK signed on October 16, 1949, as a daytimer and the second station licensed to Poughkeepsie after WKIP. The station chose the WEOK calls given that their original choice, WPOK (for Poughkeepsie) was unavailable and the WEOK calls sounded similar. In the 1950s and 1960s, WEOK was a full-service Middle of the Road radio station. Programming included news blocks in the morning and noon time hour. Late mornings were reserved for The Hyde Park Show, The Rhinebeck Show and Pleasant Valley Shows. Radio station personalities would broadcast live from area shopping centers. In the 1960s, WEOK added its Talkback show after the noon news. The mainstay telephone talk show was hosted by Raphael Mark and later by Larry Hughes.

In the late 1960s, in response to Top 40 WHVW, the station would feature rock & roll tunes in Ralph Arrigale's afternoon show. In 1962, it added an FM signal at 101.5 MHz (now WPDH). It simulcast WEOK during the day and had a series of block programing at night including classical, jazz, show tunes and folk music hosted by Raphael. The station began to lean toward soft rock and was more an adult contemporary station by 1970.

In 1972, the Dyson family bought the WEOK stations and changes took place at both frequencies. While the FM side went on its own, the AM side began to lean towards Top 40 in what today would be considered hot adult contemporary. Weekends included specialty programming including the start of the "Solid Gold Jukebox" hosted by WKIP refugee Rick McCaffrey. This format lasted until 1981, when WEOK flipped to country in the wave of the "urban cowboy" fad. Although an initial success (rated No. 2 to sister WPDH-FM) it proved difficult to sell advertising, so WEOK left the format in 1983. Though WEOK returned to what it had left, it leaned more on oldies and flipped entirely to oldies in 1986. Two years later, this format was replaced when WEOK changed to pop standards as a charter affiliate of Unistar's "AM Only" format, better known today as Westwood One's "Popular Standards" while retaining local programming drive times and parts of weekends. WEOK's oldies format and some of the air staff (including Rick McCaffery) informally migrated to WCZX. In 1993, WCZX became a sister to WEOK through a local marketing agreement, then an outright purchase in 1996.

== History since 1999 ==
The aging demographics of pop standards by the late 1990s, led WEOK owner Crystal Radio Group (the spun off Dyson family unit) to explore changing its format. In summer 1999, the decision was made to dissolve the formats of WEOK and sister WALL in Middletown and to launch a new format on the two frequencies. On September 6, 1999, WEOK dumped pop standards and joined with WALL to simulcast the talk format. Nick Robbins program director and morning man for many years took the station through many format changes under station manager Mike Harris.

The stations became known as "News-Talk 13", an amalgam of Rush Limbaugh, Dr. Laura, Poughkeepsie-centric local host Larry Hughes, ESPN Radio, and assorted other programming including the rights to the New York Yankees, New York Giants, New York Jets, and Marist College men's basketball. Complaints that programming leaned too much towards one area or another, plus the high numbers of WABC from New York City, doomed this format. On August 28, 2000, WEOK and WALL flipped to ESPN Radio as its primary format as 1340/1390 ESPN Radio though Larry Hughes would remain for nearly another year, and a brokered financial information show which dated back to the standards format would continue to air. Not long after this flip, the Crystal group was sold to Aurora Communications though most of Crystal's employees survived the move.

The ESPN Radio simulcast worked in the short-term, however the flip of WEVD in New York City (whose signal is directional to the north) to the format in August 2001, led to an uncertain future for the format. After Aurora was bought out by Cumulus Media in April 2002, and new management came in, several new formats were explored ranging from a second try at talk radio to Radio Disney. The research-obsessed Cumulus decided to switch to a Spanish language format since it seemed that the Spanish population was growing in the Hudson Valley. In September 2002, WEOK/WALL flipped to El Ritmo ("The Rhythm"), a Spanish contemporary format Program Director Nick Robbins and the first of its sort in upstate New York. The new format was seen with a critical eye as some saw that Cumulus was ahead of their time, some saw that it would have done better on an FM frequency, and some others saw the move Cumulus as ignoring the far larger African-American population. Nevertheless, the hit-or-miss nature of El Ritmo's audience, concentrated in the cities of the area, led to the station getting little, if any, ratings and being a hard sell towards advertisers given that the overall Hispanic market share of the Hudson Valley is minuscule at best.

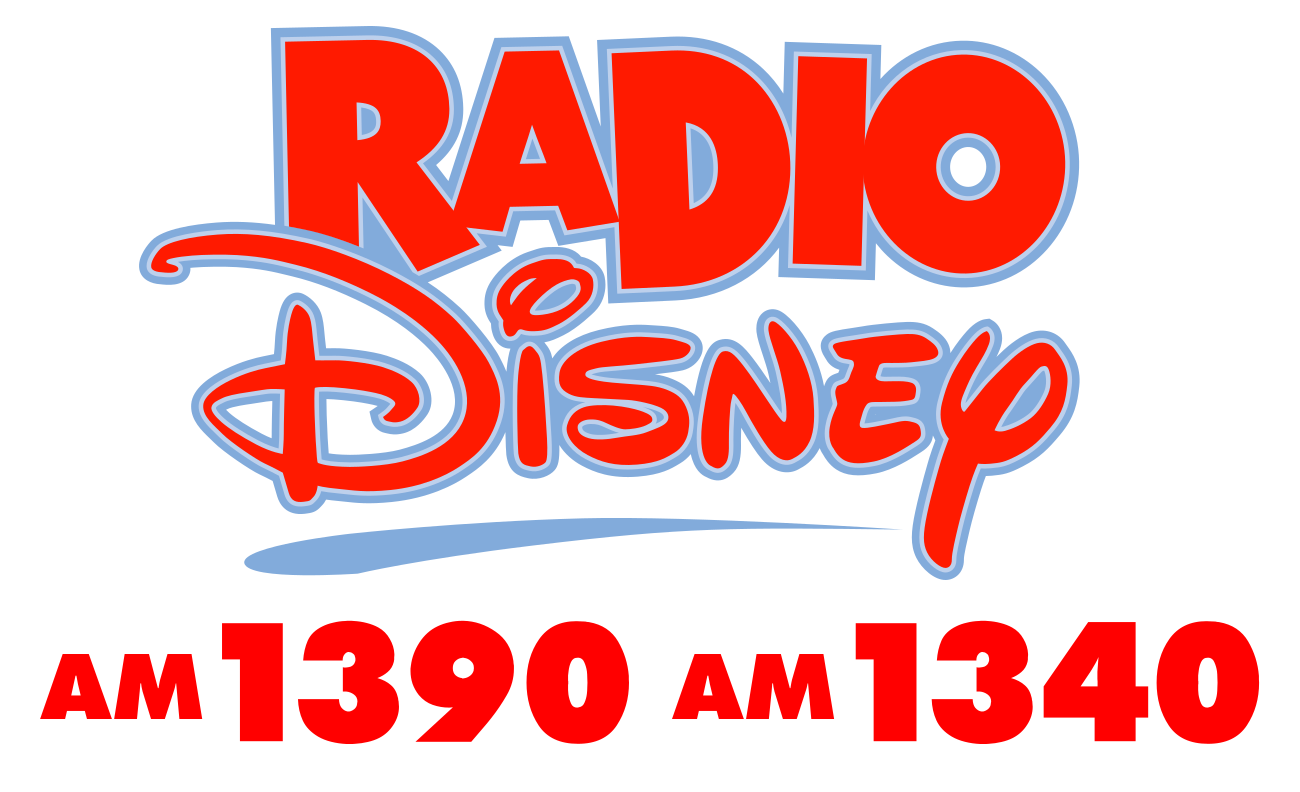
WALL and WEOK logo used from 2005 until 2007.

Though with some community support, the lack of support and lack of clients led Cumulus to flip WEOK and WALL in March 2005, to Radio Disney, the format it had nearly taken three years earlier. After almost five years as Radio Disney, WEOK and WALL changed formats in February 2010, to The True Oldies Channel. The two stations have been simulcasting programming since September 1999, going through three prior formats.

On August 30, 2013, a deal was announced in which Cumulus would swap its stations in Dubuque, Iowa and Poughkeepsie (including WEOK) to Townsquare Media in exchange for Peak Broadcasting's Fresno, California stations. The deal was part of Cumulus' acquisition of Dial Global; Townsquare, Peak, and Dial Global are all controlled by Oaktree Capital Management. The sale to Townsquare was completed on November 14.

On January 8, 2015, WEOK changed their format to regional Mexican, branded as "Fierro".

On October 30, WEOK changed their format to Spanish adult hits, branded as "Juan AM".

== Notable alumni ==
Jay Reynolds (currently of ESPN Radio) was former anchor of WEOK's 5 O'Clock News

Mike Breen, voice of the NY Knicks, also worked as a local newsman

Mark Mahoney, 2009 Pulitzer Prize winner, editorial writing. Afternoon and midday news anchor/reporter 1986–1987

Lane Bajardi, currently News Anchor at 1010 WINS, was formally News Director and anchor.

Terry Lickona, Executive Producer of Austin City Limits

== Translators ==
Broadcast translators for WPDH-HD3
Call sign	Frequency	City of license	FID	ERP (W)	HAAT	Class	Transmitter coordinates	FCC info
W239AC	95.7 FM	Middletown, New York	84803	140	76 m (249 ft)	D	41°27′25.3″N 74°26′22.6″W	LMS
W239BL	95.7 FM	Poughkeepsie, New York	147219	250	264 m (866 ft)	D	41°41′58.3″N 74°0′10.5″W	LMS
