= WPDH =

Coordinates: 41.719°N 73.996°W

- Poughkeepsie, New York; United States
- Broadcast area: Kiryas Joel–Poughkeepsie–Newburgh metropolitan area
- Frequency: 101.5 MHz (HD Radio)
- Branding: 101.5 WPDH

Programming
- Format: Classic rock
- Subchannels: HD2: WALL simulcast (Classic hits); HD3: WEOK simulcast (Spanish adult hits); HD4: WZAD simulcast (Country music); HD5: Same as HD2
- Affiliations: Compass Media Networks; Westwood One

Ownership
- Owner: Townsquare Media; (Townsquare License, LLC)
- Sister stations: WCZX, WEOK, WKXP, WPDA, WRRV, WZAD

History
- First air date: 1962; 64 years ago
- Former call signs: WEOK-FM (1962–1972)
- Call sign meaning: Poughkeepsie Dutchess Hudson

Technical information
- Licensing authority: FCC
- Facility ID: 71514
- Class: B
- ERP: 4,400 watts
- HAAT: 469 meters (1,539 ft)
- Translators: HD2: See WALL § Translators; HD3: See WEOK § Translators
- Repeater: 106.1 WPDA (Jeffersonville)

Links
- Public license information: Public file; LMS
- Webcast: Listen live
- Website: wpdh.com

WPDH (101.5 FM) is a commercial radio station licensed to Poughkeepsie, New York, and serving the Kiryas Joel–Poughkeepsie–Newburgh metropolitan area. The station is owned by Townsquare Media and broadcasts a classic rock radio format. Its studios and offices are on Pendell Road in Poughkeepsie.

WPDH has an effective radiated power (ERP) of 4,400 watts. Its transmitter site is on Illinois Mountain in Highland, New York. WPDH is also simulcast on a class A station, 106.1 WPDA in Jeffersonville, New York. Several translators relay WPDH's digital subchannels.

== History ==
=== WEOK-FM ===
In 1962, the station signed on as WEOK-FM, sister station to WEOK (1390 AM). The main purpose of the station at the outset was to provide Muzak programming to area offices and stores via its subcarrier. By day, WPDH simulcast the AM's middle of the road (MOR) format, with block programming airing between the AM's sign off and 10:00 p.m.

In 1972, WEOK AM and FM were sold to the Dyson family (also owners of Dyson Racing) and with the sale came key changes to the FM side. The transmitter moved from a site in Milton to the Illinois Mountain site. It upgraded to a full Class B signal and added FM stereo capabilities in the process.

=== Country Music to AOR ===
At the end of these upgrades, it relaunched as country music formatted WPDH. With poor ratings playing country music, management saw a hole for an album-oriented rock (AOR) station in the Hudson Valley. In 1976 WPDH abandoned country for rock music.

=== Classic Rock ===
WPDH spent the latter part of 1994 and early 1995 evolving to Classic rock.

Rob Dyson sold the Crystal Radio Group to Aurora Communications in 2001 which, in turn was acquired by Cumulus Media in 2002. Amid an extended drop in ratings, WPDH was relaunched as a mainstream rock station over Labor Day weekend 2003.

In January 2012, Andrew Boris, program director of sister station WRRV, became the new program director of WPDH. No formula changes in the programming were enacted. Boris later began hosting the morning drive time show, in addition to his PD duties.

=== Changes in Ownership ===
On August 30, 2013, a deal was announced in which Cumulus would swap its stations in Dubuque, Iowa, and Poughkeepsie (including WPDH) to Townsquare Media in exchange for Peak Broadcasting's Fresno, California stations. The deal was part of Cumulus' acquisition of Dial Global. Townsquare, Peak, and Dial Global are all controlled by Oaktree Capital Management.

The sale to Townsquare was completed on November 14, 2013.

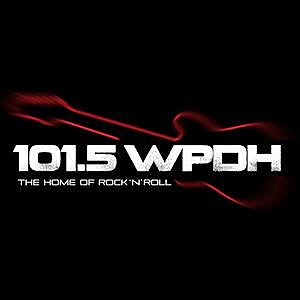
Previous logo

== Notable alumni ==
- Mike Breen, sportcaster, began his career on WPDH/WEOK around 1982-83, reading the news in the morning. Later, news/sports sidekick for Imus in the morning on NBC, play-by-play commentator for the NBA on ABC and the lead commentator for New York Knicks games on the MSG network. He also works NBA games for ESPN, and was formerly a play-by-play announcer for New York Giants preseason games, as well as for regular season NFL games on both Fox and NBC.
- Freddie Coleman, now of GameNight on ESPN Radio, entered radio at WPDH as music director and overnight host, later working at sister station WCZX.
- Dead Air Dave started his on-air career at WPDH, years before becoming a personality on 92.3 K-Rock New York and later adding dump button duties for The Howard Stern Show.

== HD Radio ==
Cumulus Broadcasting began upgrading its stations to HD Radio broadcasting in 2005. One of the first ten stations to be upgraded was WPDH.

WPDH uses its HD2 digital subchannel to rebroadcast co-owned oldies WALL 1340 AM and its HD3 subchannel to rebroadcast Spanish adult hits WEOK 1390 AM.

== See also ==
- WPDA
