= WKXP =

Coordinates: 41.896°N 73.992°W

- Kingston, New York; United States
- Broadcast area: Poughkeepsie; Newburgh; Kingston, New York
- Frequency: 94.3 MHz
- Branding: 94.3 Lite FM

Programming
- Format: Soft adult contemporary

Ownership
- Owner: Townsquare Media; (Townsquare License, LLC)
- Sister stations: WCZX; WEOK; WPDA; WPDH; WRRV; WZAD

History
- First air date: 1965 (as WGHQ-FM)
- Former call signs: WGHQ-FM (1965–75); WBPM (1975–2003)
- Call sign meaning: "Kicks Poughkeepsie" (old slogan) or a variation on "Kingston-Poughkeepsie"

Technical information
- Licensing authority: FCC
- Facility ID: 27395
- Class: A
- ERP: 2,250 watts
- HAAT: 166 meters (545 ft)

Links
- Public license information: Public file; LMS
- Webcast: Listen live
- Website: 943litefm.com

WKXP (94.3 FM) is a commercial radio station licensed to Kingston, New York, and serving the Hudson Valley of New York. The station is owned by Townsquare Media and it broadcasts a soft adult contemporary radio format from its radio studios in Poughkeepsie, New York. Weekday evenings, WKXP carries the nationally syndicated show "Intelligence for Your Life" with John Tesh.

WKXP has an effective radiated power of 2,250 watts. Its transmitter tower is off Station Road in Port Ewen, New York.

== History ==
=== WGHQ-FM ===
The station signed on in 1965 as WGHQ-FM. It was a sister station to the Thayer family-owned WGHQ (920 AM). For its first decade, WGHQ-FM would simulcast the AM's programming by day and aired automated easy listening during hours when the AM was not on the air. In 1975, WGHQ-FM split off from the AM, flipping to an automated Top 40 format, and changing its call sign to WBPM (for "World's Best Popular Music"). Several years after this switch, family patriarch Harry Thayer transferred the station ownership to his stepson Walter Maxwell and wife Jean.

By 1985, the station moved to local programming under the name B-94 and became a Kingston-focused FM station in contrast to the market-dominant WSPK, based in Beacon, New York. This arrangement worked for much of the next decade. But around 1995, the station began to target Poughkeepsie, and adjusted its format to a rhythmic top 40 approach.

Unlike most rhythmic stations, the rotation was peppered with obscure dance tracks and odd 1980s gold hits (mixed with the same jingles the station had used for the decade prior). This led it to become a cult station among dance music fans. As the 1990s came to a close, the Maxwells were looking to get out of the radio business.

=== Jammin' Oldies ===
In early 1999, the Maxwells sold WBPM and WGHQ to Roberts Radio (owners of WRWD-FM and WBWZ). That May, it was announced that WBPM would flip to the "Jammin' Oldies" format that was quite popular at the time. It became known as Rhythm 94-3, with the flip taking place on June 10 of that year. Unlike many other "Jammin' Oldies" stations, WBPM saw little increase in its ratings versus what B-94 had prior. (Meanwhile, WSPK became #1 by a considerable margin.)

In 2000, Roberts Radio sold its stations to Clear Channel Communications and the fallout from this deal had an effect on WBPM. Clear Channel was also purchasing the Straus Media stations in the market and legally was one station over the limit in the market. However, ownership regulations at the time did allow them to control additional stations. As Clear Channel was known for doing at the time, WBPM (and WCKL in Catskill) were sold to Concord Media, a "shell" company that owned stations Clear Channel controlled via local marketing agreements (LMA).

"Rhythm"'s ratings struggled further and by late 2001 the format was declared unsalvageable. On Thanksgiving weekend of that year, WBPM flipped to a satellite-fed oldies format as Cool 94.3. Existing in a glutted market for the format, this had no effect on the ratings even after established oldies outlet WCZX evolved out of the format to a 1970s/1980s approach (and later to full-out adult contemporary).

=== Cumulus ownership ===
In late 2002, the FCC ordered that Clear Channel divest itself of associations to all "shell" companies, at which point Concord Media was disbanded. On February 28, 2003, Concord sold WBPM to Cumulus Media who took over the station the next day. With the takeover, the oldies format was relaunched as an all-local format with several former WCZX jocks on the air. This format, combined with New York Yankees baseball, propelled the station to its highest numbers since the B-94 days.

However, this success was short-lived in the wake of aging demographics of the oldies format. On October 3, the station went into a weekend of Christmas music stunting (though the station continued to air Yankee games and a New York Giants football game). At 9:43 AM on October 6, the station was relaunched as Kicks 94.3, playing country music. The WKXP call letters started being used on the station a week prior.

Country was not successful on the 94.3 frequency. The ratings plummeted from the one full book as oldies under Cumulus. The reasons for this can be debated; everything from poor management to signal and promotions versus WRWD to the probability that the Hudson Valley can truly support only one country station. One theory even cites the potential of a "top of the dial" bias for country music in the Hudson Valley given that WRWD, WGNA-FM in Albany, and the former New Country Y-107 (WYNY) in Westchester County were all next to each other in the 107 MHz range and that any country stations not near that range have not succeeded.

The Spring 2005 Arbitron ratings showed the station having nearly no measurable audience outside of Yankee games. So the station went to a more youthful approach as The Wolf in fall of 2005, adding WZAD to cover Orange County and the Catskills in March 2006. Late in the Summer of 2006, "The Wolf" added some country-sounding songs by non-country artists such as The Allman Brothers, Gordon Lightfoot, Bonnie Raitt, Eric Clapton, Jewel and The Eagles.

=== Townsquare Media ===
On August 30, 2013, a deal was announced in which Cumulus would swap its stations in Dubuque, Iowa, and Poughkeepsie, New York (including WKXP), to Townsquare Media in exchange for Peak Broadcasting's stations in Fresno, California. The deal was part of Cumulus' acquisition of Dial Global; Townsquare, Peak, and Dial Global were all controlled by Oaktree Capital Management. The sale to Townsquare was completed on November 14, 2013.

On January 3, 2020, sister station WCZX in Hyde Park, New York, dropped its hot adult contemporary format and announced that it would switch to country music, simulcasting with WKXP and WZAD.

=== Soft AC ===
On February 26, 2020 at 12:00 PM, WKXP broke away from "The Wolf" network (which continued on WCZX and WZAD) and flipped to soft adult contemporary as "94.3 Lite FM". The "Lite FM" branding was previously used in the Poughkeepsie market on WRNQ from 2003 to 2014.. WKXP plays popular artists from the 1980s and 1990s to today, such as Madonna, Whitney Houston, Lionel Richie and Adele.
