= WZAD =

Coordinates: 41.601°N 74.554°W

- Wurtsboro, New York; United States
- Broadcast area: Catskill Mountains region, Orange County, northeast Pennsylvania
- Frequency: 97.3 MHz
- Branding: The Wolf

Programming
- Format: Country
- Affiliations: Compass Media Networks

Ownership
- Owner: Townsquare Media; (Townsquare License, LLC)
- Sister stations: WCZX; WEOK; WKXP; WPDA; WPDH; WRRV

History
- First air date: 1990
- Call sign meaning: "Wizard" (former station name)

Technical information
- Licensing authority: FCC
- Facility ID: 74285
- Class: A
- ERP: 620 watts
- HAAT: 219 meters (719 ft)
- Repeaters: 97.7 WCZX (Hyde Park); 101.5 WPDH-HD4 (Poughkeepsie)

Links
- Public license information: Public file; LMS
- Webcast: Listen live
- Website: hudsonvalleycountry.com

WZAD (97.3 FM The Wolf) is country music radio station licensed to Wurtsboro, New York, that serves the Catskill Mountains region, Orange County, New York, and Pike County, Pennsylvania. The station is owned by Townsquare Media and broadcasts with 620 watts ERP from a tower between Wurtsboro and Monticello. Its studios are in Poughkeepsie, New York.

WZAD's programming was a simulcast of sister station 94.3 WKXP in Kingston, an arrangement that began in March 2006 and ended in February 2020. Prior to this, WZAD had simulcast the programming of another sister station, 97.7 WCZX in Hyde Park. Since January 3, 2020, WCZX has been simulcasting WZAD's programming.

== History ==
WZAD first signed on in 1990 as part of a wave of new FM stations in the wake of the FCC's passage of Docket 80-90 which loosened class/frequency restrictions. The station began its life as The Wizard a locally based open-format station allowing DJs to choose their own music, featuring everything from contemporary folk and rock to jazz and country, with an evening talk segment and new age, world and classical music on weekends.

The station was sold in the early 1990s and immediately fired all its on-air staff and changed to a satellite-based oldies format that had a playlist spanning from the birth of rock until the mid-1980s. The station later hired new DJs, Jeff James as morning DJ, and Linda Walsh as morning co-host/news director, for its morning and afternoon hours, but was otherwise automated outside of some syndicated programming on weekends.

The oldies format would last until early 1996, when WZAD's second owner sold the station to the Poughkeepsie-based Crystal Radio Group. With this sale, Crystal saw an opportunity to strengthen its WCZX (Oldies 97-7), an oldies station in Poughkeepsie by upgrading its format and simulcasting the programming to cover most of the Hudson Valley. When Crystal took control of the stations, WCZX and WZAD were merged into one station, Oldies 97-7/Oldies 97-3, from Crystal's headquarters in Poughkeepsie with some of WZAD's local staff making the move. However, with the move came a historical reduction on WZAD's end given that all post-1975 music was stricken from the playlist given WCZX's heavy 1955–1969 musical base. The name would be modified to Oldies 97 in early 1999 to sound less unwieldy.

WZAD (and the rest of the Crystal stations) would change ownership twice in the early 2000s, first being sold to Aurora Communications in October 2000 and then to Cumulus Media when that company purchased Aurora a year later. It was the second move that led to profound changes as new management came out as being against the Oldies format which led to the push of WCZX/WZAD to change format. In February 2002 WCZX/WZAD began a gradual evolution away from oldies. Initially, they added some 1980s music. By the Summer the pre-1964 oldies were nearly gone and they were known as "Oldies 97 The Hudson valley's Best Mix". By August 2002, the station began focusing on the 1970s and played music from 1964 to 1989. Labor Day weekend in 2002 saw the name change to Mix 97, which at that time was a 1960s to 1980s music format. Late in 2002, the station began adding 90's music as well as recent hits and would evolve into an Adult Contemporary format in 2003. They would spend 2004 evolving away from its gold base.

By 2005, the WZAD end of the simulcast was losing local listenership and advertising to locally-based WVOS-FM and its adult contemporary format. At the same time, Cumulus was looking to shore up the ratings of WKXP, a poorly rated country station with coverage problems. Prior to the start of the Spring ratings in March 2006, Cumulus changed WZAD's simulcast from WCZX to WKXP in response to saving WKXP's format and to retaliate against locally based WDNB launching a country format. The first ratings book for the two stations saw a slight improvement though both stations lag considerably behind longtime leader WRWD.

On August 30, 2013, a deal was announced in which Cumulus would swap its stations in Dubuque, Iowa and Poughkeepsie, New York (including WZAD) to Townsquare Media in exchange for Peak Broadcasting's Fresno, California stations. The deal was part of Cumulus' acquisition of Dial Global; Townsquare, Peak, and Dial Global are all controlled by Oaktree Capital Management. The sale to Townsquare was completed on November 14, 2013.

On January 3, 2020, sister station Now 97.7 WCZX out of Hyde Park dropped its hot AC format and announced that it would become part of The Wolf simulcast to make a trimulcast to do competition with 107.3/99.3 WRWD-FM (Highland/Poughkeepsie)/WRWB-FM (Ellenville/Eastern Catskills). On February 26, 2020, WZAD became the main station for "The Wolf" after previous originating station WKXP flipped to soft adult contemporary as 94.3 Lite FM.
