= WKNY =

- Kingston, New York; United States
- Broadcast area: Ulster County; Hudson Valley
- Frequency: 1490 kHz
- Branding: Radio Kingston

Programming
- Format: Community radio

Ownership
- Owner: Radio Kingston Corp.

History
- First air date: December 16, 1939
- Call sign meaning: Kingston, New York

Technical information
- Licensing authority: FCC
- Facility ID: 10782
- Class: C
- Power: 1,000 watts unlimited
- Transmitter coordinates: 41°56′11″N 74°0′30″W
- Translator: 107.9 W300DU (Kingston)

Links
- Public license information: Public file; LMS
- Website: radiokingston.org/en/

WKNY (1490 kHz; "Radio Kingston") is an AM radio station in Kingston, New York, serving Ulster County. It broadcasts at a power of 1,000 watts from a single tower located off Albany Avenue. The studios and offices are located on Broadway in Kingston. WKNY is owned and operated by not-for-profit charitable licensee Radio Kingston Corp.

On March 26, 2019, a 250–watt FM translator was added, 107.9 MHz W300DU. Listeners can choose either AM or FM to hear WKNY.

== Programming ==
WKNY airs a non-commercial full service radio format, featuring adult contemporary music, news and information in AM and PM drive times, with talk and specialty music shows the rest of the day, including oldies, jazz and other genres. Programs aimed at the Irish, Italian, German and Polish communities are heard Sundays.

Warren Lawrence hosts the weekday morning show along with the Saturday afternoon oldies show and Sunday afternoon Garage Sale program. Hank Gross provides local news. Jimmy Buff is the late afternoon DJ, while Frank Auringer hosts early evenings. Adam Alberts helms Saturday mornings, in addition to production for live sporting events on the station. Antonio Flores-Lobos and Mariel Fiori are the late morning hosts of the Spanish-English show, "La Voz".

Dan Reinhard provides sports reports for WKNY, with sports updates on the weekday morning drive show, as well as hosting Monday Night SportTalk, and play-by-play broadcasts of Kingston High School football and basketball.

== History ==
On December 16, 1939, WKNY first signed on. The inaugural program was broadcast at 8:15 p.m. from the auditorium of Kingston High School before an audience of approximately 100 people. Major C.J. Heiselman was unable to attend WKNY's opening ceremonies but a recorded message from him was broadcast over the air. The musical program was rendered by Roger Baer's Orchestra, the Vocal Rhythm Boys of Saugerties and vocal solos by Miss Lynne Clark.

Following the musical program in the high school, the program continued with musical selections from the new WKNY studios in the Governor Clinton Hotel. The following morning the services in the Fair Street Reformed Church were broadcast on the air and the station was expected to have a formal dedication in January 1940.

The Federal Communications Commission (FCC) first licensed WKNY to begin full operations on January 17, 1940. At first, WKNY broadcast at 1500 kHz, at a power of 100 watts. In March 1940, the station received permission to increase power to 250 watts. In 1941, after the enactment of the North American Regional Broadcasting Agreement (NARBA), WKNY moved one spot down the dial to AM 1490

The station was first owned by John R. McKenna and his family, under the name Kingston Broadcasting Company. The first program director was Ezra McIntosh and the first manager was Leon Bernard. In 1940, John McKenna held the position of President of Kingston Broadcasting. In July 1943, Benjamin F. Feiner, Jr. stepped down as President of Kingston Broadcasting.

In 1944, WKNY moved its studios and offices to the Community Theatre Building at 601 Broadway, In March 1944, transfer of control of Kingston Broadcasting went from a group consisting of Benjamin F Feiner, Jr., Morris S. Novik, and Louis J. Furman to a new group consisting of Myer Weisenthal, Charles C Swaringer, John J. Laux, Richard Teitlebaum, Louis Berkman, Louis J. Furman, and Morris S. Novik.

In 1954, the Kingston Broadcasting Company put a television station on the air, WKNY-TV. It started on channel 66 and later moved to channel 21. While it was licensed to Kingston, its studios and tower were in Poughkeepsie. WKNY-TV carried programming from the four TV networks at the time: CBS, NBC, ABC and the DuMont. It served as the only television station between New York City and Albany. In the 1950s, few people had TV sets that could receive UHF channels, above 13, and the advertising base in the sparsely populated Hudson Valley was small. WKNY-TV only lasted two years, suspending operations in 1956.

In the 1960s and 1970s, WKNY was a Top 40 station. It aired the syndicated countdown show "American Top 40 with Casey Kasem" on Saturdays from 8am-noon. By the 1980s, WKNY evolved to a full-service adult contemporary format, when it was in competition with Walter C. Maxwell's WGHQ.

In 1971, the station moved to 212 Fair Street in a house formerly owned by Mayor Raymond Garraghan. In 1986, WKNY moved into its present studio and offices at 718 Broadway.

Noted former personalities include "Morning Mayor" Ward Todd, who enjoyed a high ratings in the era when AM radio captured a large wake-up audience. WKNY also aired New York Yankees baseball for many years before the games shifted to country music station WKXP, when it was co-owned with WKNY.

In 2002, Cumulus Media, a major owner of radio stations across the U.S., acquired WKNY. On August 30, 2013, a deal was announced in which Cumulus would swap its stations in Dubuque, Iowa, and Poughkeepsie, New York, including WKNY, to Townsquare Media in exchange for Peak Broadcasting's stations in Fresno, California. The deal was part of Cumulus' acquisition of Dial Global. Townsquare, Peak, and Dial Global were all controlled by Oaktree Capital Management. The transaction was consummated effective November 14, 2013.

On August 2, 2017, a new non-profit organization, The Radio Kingston Corporation, announced an agreement with Townsquare to purchase WKNY and move it to non-commercial status. Thirty–year broadcast veteran Jimmy Buff, former program director and morning host for WDST in Woodstock, New York, was named executive director of Radio Kingston. On October 31, 2017, the sale between Radio Kingston Corp and Townsquare was completed at a price of $500,000.

== On-air personalities ==
- Jimmy Buff, Executive Director/"Jimmy Buff Loves You" Host
- Warren Lawrence, Program Director/Music DJ
- Adam Alberts, Producer/Music DJ/Digital Editor
- Ida Hakkila, Imaging Director/"The Heavy Light Show" Host
- Kale Kaposhilin, Technical Director
- Manuel Blas, Technical Supervisor/Show Host
- Frank Auringer, Music DJ
- Dan Reinhard, Sports
- Hank Gross, Local News Reporter
- Cappy Foster, Stock Market Analyst
- Shayne Gallo & Bill Ford, "Speak Out" Hosts
- Ed Gaddy & John Crispell, "Right Time Radio" Hosts
- Rev. Charles Stickley, "Morning Meditations" Host
- Ken Brett / Bill Yosh, "Irish Show" Hosts
- Steve Adamczyk, "Polkatime Sunday" Host
- Hans Safer, "German Show" Host
- Nadine Ferraro & Kevin Godbey, "Happy Hour" Hosts
- Don Ryan & Rick Cahill, "Rick n' Ryan" Hosts
- beetle bailey & FreedomWalker Peace, "The Black Meta" Hosts
- Nick Panken, "Freedom Highway" Host
- Blake Pfeil, "The Pfeil File" Host
- Peter Wetzler, "Sound Forms Classical Music and Beyond" Host
