= WBWZ =

Coordinates: 41.700°N 74.003°W

- New Paltz, New York; United States
- Broadcast area: Poughkeepsie-Newburgh-Kingston, New York
- Frequency: 93.3 MHz
- Branding: Z93.3

Programming
- Format: Classic rock
- Affiliations: Premium Choice iHeartRadio

Ownership
- Owner: iHeartMedia, Inc.; (iHM Licenses, LLC)
- Sister stations: WJIP, WKIP, WRNQ, WCTW,WPKF, WRWD-FM, WHUC, WZCR, WRWB-FM

History
- First air date: December 20, 1992
- Call sign meaning: Betty Walker (original owner) Z–Rock (original format)

Technical information
- Licensing authority: FCC
- Facility ID: 48615
- Class: A
- ERP: 330 watts
- HAAT: 295 meters (968 ft)

Links
- Public license information: Public file; LMS
- Webcast: Listen Live
- Website: z93hv.iheart.com

WBWZ (93.3 MHz "Z93.3") is a commercial FM radio station licensed to New Paltz, New York, and serving the Mid-Hudson Valley of New York state. The station is owned by iHeartMedia, Inc. Its effective radiated power (ERP) is 330 watts, broadcasting from a transmitter near Illinois Mountain in Marlborough, New York, on a tower shared with longtime sister station 107.3 WRWD-FM.

Z93 calls itself "Today's Classic Rock". It primarily plays harder-edged classic rock titles with some active rock songs from the 1990s and 2000s that are not usually heard on Classic Rock stations. Its main competition is 101.5 WPDH in Poughkeepsie, which also leans to classic rock but not as hard-edged.

== History ==
WBWZ's construction permit was awarded by the Federal Communications Commission (FCC) in 1991 to Betty Walker, the mother of then-WRWD owner William H. ("Bud") Walker. She also owned a local apple orchard. Prior to sign-on, the younger Walker signed an agreement to operate WBWZ with WRWD from the company's studios in Highland. After testing for the first part of December 1992, WBWZ formally signed on the air on December 20, 1992. At first, it carried ABC's "Z Rock" satellite-delivered hard rock format. The station called itself "Z-Rock 93.3." With limited outside promotion and no rock station targeting younger audiences, WBWZ entered the Top 10 of the Poughkeepsie ratings in its first two books.

While WBWZ had a loyal audience and good numbers, the Walkers found it hard to sell WBWZ to advertisers, alongside the country music format of WRWD. Coupled with the decline of hard rock and the rise of alternative rock, the Walkers decided Z-Rock 93.3 needed to change its format. In February 1995 the station flipped to a satellite-fed 1970s music format as "Z-93." The station had an initial surge of listeners. But then the ratings began to fall again.

Shortly after the format change, Bud Walker bought the license of WBWZ after the loosening of FCC regulations, permitting one company to own more than one FM station in a region. In early 1996, Walker decided to leave radio to pursue a career in politics. He sold WBWZ, WRWD, and WWLE to Hudson Valley Radio Partners, a short-term holding company. In November 1996, with the ownership change, WBWZ's format switched to a locally-run Hot Adult Contemporary format while keeping the Z-93 name. Within a month, the station hired morning host Mark Bolger, who had recently exited Top 40 station 104.7 WSPK. His newscaster/co-host Dawn Spicer was also hired. However, their non-compete clauses with WSPK barred them from the air until mid-1997. Shortly after taking the air, Hudson Valley Radio Partners was sold to California-based Roberts Radio.

Bolger's presence proved to be key for the station as WBWZ soon saw an increase in the ratings (at its peak being behind only 104.7 WSPK and 101.5 WPDH, both more powerful stations). WBWZ also became #1 in morning drive time. WBWZ added more market veterans and targeted former WSPK listeners.

In 2000, Roberts Radio was bought by Clear Channel Communications with Clear Channel taking control that November. Though WBWZ was aided by the elimination of rival 96.1 WCTJ (now WPKF), its ratings soon began to slip to levels not seen since prior to the Hot AC format. After the decline stretched several years, the station's operations were taken over by WPKF program director Jimi Jamm (Jim Collins). On June 30, 2003, Z-93 was replaced by the more CHR-leaning "Star 93.3." Bolger remained in mornings, while Dawn Spicer left for WGY in Schenectady in April 2005. In December 2010, Clear Channel replaced Bolger with WPKF Program Director Chris Marino.

In 2011, as an economy move, Clear Channel switched many of its Hudson Valley stations to national Premium Choice formats, eliminating local DJs and locally programmed music.

On March 14, 2012, at 4 pm, WBWZ changed its format to classic rock, branded as "Rock 93.3."

On July 11, 2012, Gary Cee, formerly of 101.5 WPDH, became the first local DJ on Rock 93.3, hosting middays 10 a.m to 3 p.m.

On October 3, 2016, WBWZ rebranded as "Z93".
