= WKIP (disambiguation) =

WKIP is a radio station (1450 AM) licensed to Poughkeepsie, New York, United States.

WKIP may also refer to:

- WRWB-FM, a radio station (99.3 FM) licensed to Ellenville, New York, which held the call sign WKIP-FM from 2009 to 2012
- WRRB, a radio station (96.9 FM) licensed to Arlington, New York, which held the call sign WKIP-FM from 1991 to 1993
- WSPK, a radio station (104.7 FM) licensed to Poughkeepsie, New York, which held the call sign WKIP-FM from 1947 to 1952
