= WELV (disambiguation) =

WELV-LP is a radio station (107.9 FM) licensed to Ellenville, New York.

WELV may also refer to:

- WJIP, a radio station (1370 AM) licensed to Ellenville, New York, which held the call sign WELV from 1964 to 2004
- WRWB-FM, a radio station (99.3 FM) licensed to Ellenville, New York, which held the call sign WELV from 1970 to 1981 and 1984 to 1989
- WGLU, a radio station (102.5 FM) licensed to Warner Robins, Georgia, which held the call sign WELV from 2002 to 2004
- WELV (virus) or Wetland virus
