= WBPM =

Radio station in Saugerties, New York

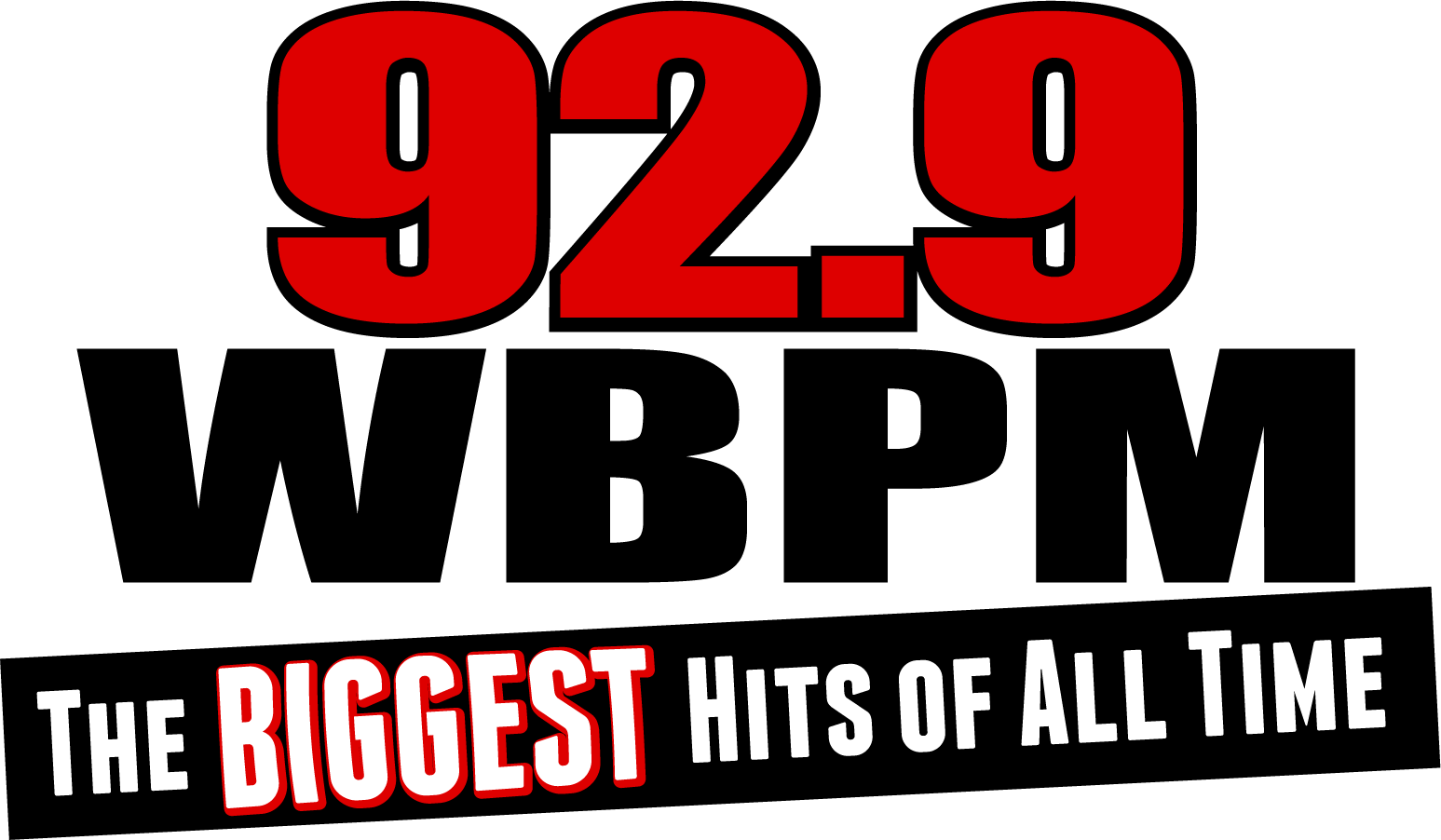
- Saugerties, New York; United States
- Broadcast area: Mid-Hudson
- Frequency: 92.9 MHz
- Branding: 92.9 WBPM

Programming
- Format: Classic hits

Ownership
- Owner: Pamal Broadcasting; (6 Johnson Road Licenses, Inc.)
- Sister stations: WBNR; WGHQ; WHUD; WLNA; WSPK; WXPK

History
- First air date: October 22, 1999
- Former call signs: WRKW (1999–2004)
- Call sign meaning: "World's Best Popular Music"

Technical information
- Licensing authority: FCC
- Facility ID: 43444
- Class: A
- ERP: 6,000 watts
- HAAT: 88 meters (289 ft)
- Transmitter coordinates: 41°59′20.3″N 74°1′6.5″W

Links
- Public license information: Public file; LMS
- Webcast: Listen live
- Website: www.929wbpm.com

WBPM (92.9 FM) is a classic hits radio station icensed to Saugerties, New York, and serving the Mid-Hudson Valley. The station is owned by Pamal Broadcasting and broadcasts at 6,000 watts ERP from a tower in the Town of Kingston, New York, while its studios are located on Route 52 in Beacon.

== History ==
The allocation for 92.9 MHz in Saugerties, was added to the FCC's Table of Allotments in June 1998. The allotment was applied for and won by then-WRNQ, WKIP, WTND owner Eric Straus. In its preparation to reach the air, its tower site changed from WDST's original tower in Lake Katrine to a defunct AT&T microwave relay tower site in the Town of Kingston, given that a feasibility study showed that from the former very little signal would reach the main target market of Poughkeepsie.

On September 15, 1999, the allotment was assigned the call letters WRKW, signed on for testing that October 23, and made a full launch on November 1, 1999. WRKW's launch format was a "rock adult contemporary" format called Quality Rock which was automated and jockless outside of the syndicated Bob & Tom morning show. Later a voicetracked PM drive jock and the syndicated weekend show The Beatle Years was added. Considering that the same music was available on the far stronger WPDH, the station struggled to make a showing.

After Clear Channel Communications purchased Straus' stations in 2000, the format remained unchanged until 2002 due to contractual obligations to the firm that programmed the Quality Rock format. On June 26, 2002, at 10 a.m., the station entered a 26-hour-long stunt of Eminem's "Without Me". The next day at noon, WRKW relaunched as active rock 92.9 Rock. Unlike its predecessor, the station launched with DJ's taken from sister stations and a heavy promotion blitz and quickly became a middle-of-the pack radio station.

In March 2003, the syndicated Waking with the Wolf show began airing on the station. "The Wolf" had been on WPDH for several years before moving to WPYX in Albany, New York. This show did not live up to the station's expectations and was canceled 14 months later when the station changed formats again.

On May 26, 2004, WRKW changed format to oldies as Cool 92.9 and soon thereafter took the WBPM calls which had served nearly three decades on 94.3 FM and with air staff formerly of that station and oldies predecessor WCZX.

In late May 2006, it was announced that WBPM and sister station WGHQ would be swapped to Pamal Broadcasting along with Clear Channel's cluster in Rutland, Vermont (WSYB, WZRT), and WPYR in Baton Rouge, Louisiana, for WRNX in Amherst, Massachusetts. The deal made WBPM a sister station to market leaders WSPK and WHUD as well as WBNR and WLNA. On February 1, 2007, the station switched from oldies to classic hits.

On March 15, 2021, WBPM began to simulcast its classic hits programming on WBNR and WLNA. The move was primarily to better use the FM translators associated with the AM signals. The simulcast allowed WBPM a larger coverage area including the southern part of the Poughkeepsie metro.
