= WJIP =

Simulcast of WKIP, Poughkeepsie
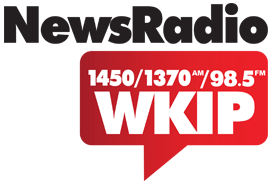
- Ellenville, New York; United States
- Broadcast area: Southeastern Catskill Mountains
- Frequency: 1370 kHz
- Branding: News Radio 1450/1370 WKIP

Programming
- Format: News/talk
- Affiliations: Compass Media Networks; Fox News Radio; Premiere Networks; Westwood One

Ownership
- Owner: iHeartMedia; (iHM Licenses, LLC)
- Sister stations: WBWZ; WCTW; WHUC; WKIP; WPKF; WRNQ; WRWB-FM; WRWD-FM; WZCR

History
- First air date: 1964
- Former call signs: WELV (1964–2004); WRWD (2004–2006); WELG (2006–2009); WRWD (2009–2012)

Technical information
- Licensing authority: FCC
- Facility ID: 63528
- Class: D
- Power: 5,000 watts day
- Transmitter coordinates: 41°44′19.3″N 74°23′46.6″W

Links
- Public license information: Public file; LMS
- Webcast: Listen live (via iHeartRadio)
- Website: 1450wkip.iheart.com

WJIP (1370 AM) is a radio station broadcasting a news/talk radio format. The station is owned by iHeartMedia, through licensee iHM Licenses, LLC, and is licensed to Ellenville, New York, United States. The station broadcasts with a power of 5,000 watts, daytime only, from a single tower located off Irish Cape Road in the hamlet of Napanoch.

The station simulcasts the programming of WKIP in nearby Poughkeepsie. Weekdays begin with a local morning show, Hudson Valley Focus Live with Tom Sipos. The rest of the day features nationally syndicated shows, mostly from co-owned Premiere Networks, including Rush Limbaugh, Sean Hannity, Glenn Beck, Mark Levin and This Morning, America's First News with Gordon Deal. Weekends feature shows from Kim Komando, Joe Pags, Gary Sullivan, Leo Laporte, Ric Edelman, Bill Handel and The Jesus Christ Show. Some weekend hours are paid brokered programming. Most hours begin with world and national news from Fox News Radio.

== History ==
The station was known as WELV for 40 years. WELV first went on the air in 1964 with a full service format featuring a variety of local programming. The format was a broad based free-flowing middle of the road music format leaning adult contemporary.

In 1975, Robin Cohen became the first female DJ at WELV. Using her on-air name Julie Russell (after a character from daytime TV drama Days of Our Lives) she hosted her weekend show Friday to Sunday until moving to California in 1976. As Raven West, she published Red Wine For Breakfast, a novel centered around her radio experiences.

Its sister station 99.3 (now WRWB-FM) shared the WELV call letters from 1970 to 1981 and 1984 to 1989. In the early part of 1985, WELV and WELV-FM were sold to Straus Communications and flipped to an adult standards format mixing in limited amounts of soft rock and baby boomer pop hits. Initially, the syndicated "Unforgettable" format was aired. By 1986, standards format was programmed in-house. In 1991, WELV flipped to a news/talk format with mostly syndicated programming.

Bob Mangels was the morning host for several decades, through the late 1990s. In the late 1990s, Mangels hosted "The Breakfast Club", with Ken Gonyea, which aired on Straus Media's four AM stations: WELV, WKIP, WCKL, and WHUC. By 1999, Mike Winters hosted this quad cast morning show. The quad cast continued until 2002, when the AM programming was broken up into several different formats.

Studios were originally on Canal Street in Ellenville, above Matthews Pharmacy, and in the early 1980s, moved to 22 N. Main Street, where they remained until moving to Straus Media's facilities in the Arlington section of Poughkeepsie in 1997.

The station changed its call sign to WRWD, on November 11, 2004, to simulcast its country music sister station, WRWD-FM 107.3. On December 4, 2006, the station changed its call letters to WELG. By 2006, the station's original call letters were no longer available, as they were in use by Ellenville Central School District's WELV-LP.

In November 2009, the station and FM sister 99.3 swapped formats: 1370 AM reverted to WRWD, carrying a country format, while the news/talk format went to 99.3 FM as WKIP-FM. On March 8, 2012, WRWD changed its format to back to news/talk, simulcasting WKIP in Poughkeepsie. The call letters were switched to WJIP the next day (March 9).
