= WRWD =

WRWD may refer to:

- WRWD-FM, a radio station (107.3 FM) licensed to serve Highland, New York, United States
- WJIP, a radio station (1370 AM) licensed to serve Ellenville, New York, which held the call sign WRWD from 2004 to 2006 and from 2009 to 2012
