= WCTW =

Coordinates: 42.201°N 73.835°W

- Catskill, New York; United States
- Broadcast area: Upper Hudson Valley
- Frequency: 98.5 MHz
- Branding: 98.5 The Cat

Programming
- Format: Hot adult contemporary
- Affiliations: Westwood One

Ownership
- Owner: iHeartMedia; (iHM Licenses, LLC)
- Sister stations: WJIP; WKIP; WRNQ; WPKF; WRWD-FM; WHUC; WBWZ; WZCR; WRWB-FM

History
- First air date: September 6, 1990
- Former call signs: WQKZ (1990–92)
- Call sign meaning: "Cat"

Technical information
- Licensing authority: FCC
- Facility ID: 63527
- Class: A
- ERP: 4,700 watts
- HAAT: 114 meters (374 ft)

Links
- Public license information: Public file; LMS
- Webcast: Listen live (via iHeartRadio)
- Website: 985thecat.iheart.com

WCTW (98.5 FM "98.5 The Cat") is a hot adult contemporary music formatted radio station licensed to Catskill, New York, and serving Columbia and Greene counties as well as the upper Hudson Valley, the southern Capital District, and Berkshire County, Massachusetts. The station is owned by iHeartMedia and broadcasts at 4.7 kW ERP from the center tower of the three-tower array used by former sister station WCKL, on Route 9G in Greenport, New York. WCTW's signal can be received as far north as Albany and as far south as Poughkeepsie; however, the station begins to mix with co-channel WCKM-FM and WTRY-FM (on 98.3) north of Albany.

== History ==
The 98.5 frequency, the first FM station in Greene County, New York, first came into being in early 1988 as a construction permit bearing the WCKL-FM call sign as a sister to WCKL. Originally, the plans for the station were to simulcast the popular standards format of WCKL but at some point in 1990 these plans were changed for the 98.5 frequency to go on its own under the new call letters as WQKZ. With those calls, the station would begin testing late that August and on September 6 would sign on with a contemporary hit radio format as "The Mid-Hudson Valley's Power Station, Z98.5". This is not to be confused with "KZ96.7", a "Rock 40" station that briefly served the Capital District to the north. Being an all-local station outside of signing off overnights and some weekend programming, Z98.5 attracted listeners from WBPM, then at 94.3 MHz as "B94", in Kingston. However, its presence in a small, unrated market at a time of Top 40 radio's decline was a challenge. Attracting listeners against established rivals such as WSPK, WBPM, and WFLY made things even worse. The station began to lose money.

In late 1991, Straus Media (owner of WELV and WWWK in Ellenville) purchased WCKL and WQKZ. Looking to make the pairing of stations more attractive to advertisers and wanting to cut costs, Straus flipped WQKZ to a hot adult contemporary format as WCTW ("The Cat") in February 1992 with the station going to satellite-fed programming outside of mornings which retained Z98.5 morning host Bob Johnson. Straus would later buy the cross-river rivals of WCKL and WCTW, Hudson-based WRVW and WHUC, in early 1995 giving Straus a practical monopoly on radio between Kingston and Albany. This would be followed in July 1996 by Johnson getting a move to afternoons (with the studios moving from Catskill to Poughkeepsie alongside Straus' stations there) with the syndicated Bob & Sheri morning show–based out of WWSN in Charlotte–coming to the station as its first affiliate.

=== Poughkeepsie expansion ===
In 1998, Poughkeepsie based translator W292CM (106.3 MHz) signed on with a simulcast of WCTW's programming. With nearly no promotion, WCTW showed in the Poughkeepsie ratings in the spring of 1999, nearly tying the full-power WTND, itself a Straus station. Seeing an opportunity, Straus decided to flip WTND to a variation of WCTW under the WCTJ calls that August. W292CM would soon switch to simulcasting sister station WTHN and now relays WDST.

The presence of WCTJ was both a blessing and a curse for WCTW. The addition of an audience in a rated market allowed the WCTW end of the "Cat" stations to work with a larger budget and allowed WCTW to phase out satellite programming given the ability to use such tools as voicetracking. However, the attempt to try to run one station as two became a strain given the distance and differences between the two areas and that air talent was doing double the work with staggered breaks between the two stations. A general glut of hot AC music in the mid-Hudson Valley did not help matters as well and with Straus's sale to Clear Channel Communications (now iHeartMedia) in 2000 the days of the WCTJ part of the simulcast were numbered.

WCTW and WCTJ were split in October of that year with WCTJ keeping a frozen, all-automated version of that format until December 23 of that year when it flipped to rhythmic CHR as WPKF.

=== Post-2000 ===
With the Clear Channel purchase of Straus came the later sale of the Catskill stations (and WBPM) to Concord Media, a front company with ties to Clear Channel that existed to warehouse additional stations controlled by Clear Channel. The Clear Channel/Concord combination moved the studios of those stations to a new location in Hudson and, with it, WCTW returned to a mostly-satellite fed format which would remain for the next several years.

In April 2005, WCTW would change its format to adult contemporary with the "Lite FM" branding as part of an expansion of the brand throughout the Hudson Valley in an attempt to compete with Pamal Broadcasting-owned rivals WHUD and WYJB.

In May 2009, WCTW reverted to hot adult contemporary, once again under the "Cat" branding.
