= 1170 AM =

AM radio frequency

The following radio stations broadcast on AM frequency 1170 kHz: 1170 AM is a United States clear-channel frequency. Class A status is shared by three stations: KOTV in Tulsa, Oklahoma, WWVA in Wheeling, West Virginia, and KJNP in North Pole, Alaska.

Because 1170 kHz is a multiple of both 9 and 10, the frequency is available for use by broadcast stations in all three ITU regions.

== Argentina ==
- LRA29 in San Luis
- Mi Pais in Hurlingham, Buenos Aires

== China ==
- CNR The Voice of China, mainly in Huizhou

== Mexico ==
- XERT-AM in Reynosa, Tamaulipas

== Philippines ==
- DZCA, in Manila
- DXMR, in Zamboanga City

== Slovenia ==
- Radio Capodistria in Koper

== South Korea ==
- KBS World Radio

 Korean service (19:00~20:00 KST)
 Japanese service (20:00~21:00 KST)
 Russian service (21:00~22:00 KST)
 Chinese service (22:00~23:00 KST)

- KBS Hanminjok Radio (23:00~13:00 KST)

Power: D500kW

== United States ==
Stations in bold are clear-channel stations.

Call sign	City of license	Facility ID	Class	Daytime power (kW)	Nighttime power (kW)	Critical hours power (kW)	Transmitter coordinates
KCBQ	San Diego, California	13509	B	50	2.9		32.895°N 116.925278°W
KFOW	Waseca, Minnesota	70931	D	2.5	0.005	1	44.045833°N 93.385556°W
KJJD	Windsor, Colorado	58940	D	1			40.462778°N 104.913056°W
**KJNP**	North Pole, Alaska	19866	A	50	21		64.759444°N 147.323889°W
KJXX	Jackson, Missouri	65795	D	0.25	0.005		37.381944°N 89.653333°W
KLOK	San Jose, California	41339	B	50	9		37.357778°N 121.871389°W
**KOTV**	Tulsa, Oklahoma	68329	A	50	50		36.146389°N 95.807222°W
KPUG	Bellingham, Washington	58887	B	10	5		48.776111°N 122.439167°W
KYET	Golden Valley, Arizona	64357	D	6	0.001		35.213056°N 114.113889°W
WAVS	Davie, Florida	58309	B	5	0.25		26.0775°N 80.2175°W
WCLN	Clinton, North Carolina	7090	D	5		1	35.0225°N 78.349444°W
WCXN	Claremont, North Carolina	71306	D	7.7		1	35.726111°N 81.147778°W
WDEK	Lexington, South Carolina	250	D	10		3.3	33.973611°N 81.149722°W
WDFB	Junction City, Kentucky	1197	D	1			37.596111°N 84.838611°W
WFDL	Waupun, Wisconsin	42092	D	1			43.643056°N 88.723611°W
WFPB	Orleans, Massachusetts	8591	D	0.67			41.780556°N 70.010556°W
WGMP	Montgomery, Alabama	43633	D	0.85	0.007		32.454722°N 86.290556°W
WKFL	Bushnell, Florida	62365	D	1			28.708611°N 82.126667°W
WLEO	Ponce, Puerto Rico	52943	B	0.2	0.2		17.981111°N 66.613611°W
WRPM	Poplarville, Mississippi	17476	D	1			30.815278°N 89.506667°W
WSOS	St. Augustine Beach, Florida	70404	D	0.71			29.918056°N 81.390556°W
WWLE	Cornwall, New York	72622	D	0.8			41.44°N 74.073611°W
WWTR	Bridgewater, New Jersey	6684	D	0.6			40.560278°N 74.589444°W
**WWVA**	Wheeling, West Virginia	44046	A	50	50		40.101944°N 80.867222°W
