= WTHK (disambiguation) =

WTHK is the call sign for a radio station (100.7 MHz) in Wilmington, Vermont

WTHK may also refer to:

- WPEN (FM), a radio station (97.5 MHz) in Burlington, New Jersey, which held the call sign WTHK from 2005 to 2006
- WPST, a radio station (94.5 MHz) in Trenton, New Jersey, which held the call sign WTHK from 2002 to 2005
- WZCR, a radio station (93.5 MHz) in Hudson, New York, which held the call sign WTHK from 1995 to 2001
