= WXPK =

Adult album alternative radio station in Briarcliff Manor, New York

- Briarcliff Manor, New York; United States
- Broadcast area: Westchester County, New York
- Frequency: 107.1 MHz
- Branding: 107.1 The Peak

Programming
- Format: Adult album alternative

Ownership
- Owner: Pamal Broadcasting; (6 Johnson Road Licenses, Inc.)
- Sister stations: WBNR; WBPM; WGHQ; WHUD; WLNA; WSPK

History
- First air date: April 8, 1960
- Former call signs: WRNW (1960–1982); WZFM (1982–1991); WXPS (1991–1994); WRGX (1994–1997); WWXY (1997–1998); WYNY (1998–2003)
- Call sign meaning: Similar to WSPK (adopted during K-104/K-107 simulcast); backronym for current "Peak" branding

Technical information
- Licensing authority: FCC
- Facility ID: 50056
- Class: A
- ERP: 1,900 watts
- HAAT: 180 meters (590 ft)
- Transmitter coordinates: 41°4′49.3″N 73°48′24.5″W

Links
- Public license information: Public file; LMS
- Webcast: Listen live
- Website: www.1071thepeak.com

WXPK (107.1 MHz), branded 107.1 The Peak, is a commercial radio station licensed to Briarcliff Manor, New York, and serving Westchester County, New York. It is owned by Pamal Broadcasting and broadcasts an adult album alternative (AAA) radio format. The station's studios are located on Mamaroneck Avenue in White Plains and its transmitter is off the Sprain Brook Parkway at the Westchester County Correctional Facility in Valhalla.

== History ==
On April 8, 1960, WRNW got its start at 454 Main Street in Mount Kisco playing a mixture of light classical music and easy listening songs. It began broadcasting in FM stereo in 1964. Founder and broadcast engineer Richard Burden was instrumental in the development of FM stereo broadcasting. By 1967, the station had moved to the second floor at 78 Lexington Avenue, and in June of that year, program director Don Bayley adopted an album rock format making WRNW one of the first FM stations in the New York City area to play rock music full time. (New York's WOR-FM went rock in 1966, but was hampered by an AFTRA strike; WNEW-FM started its progressive rock format in October 1967.) In 1969, WRNW was sold to Lake Champlain Broadcasting Company, which also owned 105.9 WHBI in Newark. WRNW then played big band music during the day and sold brokered programming from 10 p.m.–2 a.m. weekdays and all day weekends to clients shared with WHBI. According to WRNW's founder, the call letters stood for "Wonderful Radio Northern Westchester".

In 1971, WRNW changed to an easy listening format, and then to Top 40. In 1972, the station transitioned to a progressive rock format. On Monday, July 9, 1973, WRNW inaugurated transmissions from its new Briarcliff Manor studio on the second floor of a small house at 55 Woodside Avenue. The new transmitter was in Irvington, covering White Plains, Yonkers and other parts of Westchester and Rockland Counties.

It was there, that Howard Stern obtained his first full time paying radio job as a disc jockey and program director. Meg Griffin, later of WNEW-FM, WPIX-FM, WXRK and Sirius Satellite Radio, was also music director of the station during the mid-70s. Ted Utz also began his professional career at the station in 1976 and went on to program and manage pioneering stations like WMMR in Philadelphia and WNEW-FM in New York. Earle Bailey (WLIR, WNEW-FM, WMMR, Sirius XM Radio's Deep Tracks) hosted a shift at the station during the progressive rock era as did Doug Berman, now producer of National Public Radio programs Car Talk and Wait Wait... Don't Tell Me!.

In 1982, the station flipped to an adult contemporary (AC) format, first known as Magic 107. It soon adopted the WZFM call letters and became known on-air as Z-107. The AC format was in place until 1991.

WZFM was perhaps best known as the home of "The Saturday Night Special", a freewheeling five-hour request 'n' contest good time oldies/comedy series which, over a nine-year run, became the station's highest-rated program. Co-hosts Gary Theroux and Kerin McCue also developed spinoff specials which were syndicated to other outlets, such as "The Halloween Spooktacular" and the 12-hour "Christmas Through The Years". A three CD adaptation of the latter was released by Reader's Digest Records and ultimately sold over six million box sets.

"The Saturday Night Special" remained on the air through a call letter change to WXPS The Express until the station was sold to new owners. In the early 1990s, the new owners flipped the station to an alternative rock format as Today's Rock: X-107 with the WRGX call letters.

On December 5, 1996, the station became part of the Big City Radio trimulcast (and eventual "quadcast") with other 107.1 stations on Long Island, in northern New Jersey and, later, the Allentown–Lehigh Valley, Pennsylvania area. WRGX and the other two multicast stations switched formats to country music as "New Country Y-107"; the station originated from Big City Radio's headquarters in Hawthorne. WRGX became known as WWXY and later adopted the call letters of former New York City country station WYNY.

On May 8, 2002, after a day of stunting with construction noises, the quadcast adopted a tropical music format branded Rumba 107. The format was ill-suited to the quadcast suburban signals, and at the end of the year, Big City Radio filed for bankruptcy and sold the quadcast to Nassau Broadcasting. Nassau broke up the quadcast, leasing WYNY to Pamal Broadcasting under a local marketing agreement (LMA).

On April 3, 2003, at 3 p.m., 107.1 flipped to a simulcast of WSPK in Poughkeepsie, cobranded as "K104 and K107". The first song under the simulcast was "Ignition" by R. Kelly. In 2004, Pamal ended the WSPK simulcast and debuted the adult album rock format WXPK has today as The Peak. Pamal completed the purchase of WXPK from Nassau at the end of 2004.

== Programming ==
The Peak adopted the moniker "World Class Rock for New York's Backyard" in April 2004. Staffed by veteran broadcasters from New York City and around the country, The Peak is the only commercial Triple A radio station in the New York City area. The Program Director is Chris Herrmann (WHJY, Providence; WCSX, Detroit; WBOS, Boston) who doubles as the midday host. "The Morning Peak" is the morning drive show, and is currently hosted by Chris "Coach" Rodriguez. Previously the morning slot was hosted by Caroline Corley (Sirius Satellite Radio; WLIR, Garden City; WYNY, New York.) until her death on November 25, 2013. Longtime New York radio personality Jimmy Fink (WHFS, Bethesda; WXRK, New York; WPLJ, New York) is the afternoon host. Weekends are branded as "The Weekend Peak". Current weekend lineup features Pam Landry, Meg White, and Dina Dessner. Previous air talent included veteran broadcasters Bruce Figler and Kerin McCue. The Peak dedicates minimal airtime to syndicated programming; "Anything Anything" (hosted by Rich Russo) airs 9-10pm on Sunday. The Bluesmobile (hosted by Elwood Blues) previously aired 8 pm on Sundays.

The "Peak Performance Series" brings artists to what the station calls "the world's most intimate performance venue", starting at the Acme Recording and Mastering studio in Mamaroneck, New York and now at Mercy University sound studios and at a summer series at The Barley Beach House in Rye, New York. Earlier, select members of the station's listener rewards program, The Peak Listener Advisory Board, were invited to attend, now the beach sessions are opened to the general public. The performances are recorded and played back on the air. The resulting tracks are exclusive to The Peak and are generally not available for purchase or download, although the station has released compilation albums. "Peak Performance Pop-ups" feature tracks from these live performances and are played back on the air several times a day. The Peak can be heard nationwide via The Peak App and online at 1071thepeak.com. Peak-TV is a feature of YouTube that presents various live performances recorded by the radio station.

Like format leader KBCO in Denver, Colorado, The Peak airs a locally produced "10 at 10" weekdays at 10 am and 10 pm. The program features 10 songs from a single year peppered with snippets of popular movies, television shows, and commercials from that year. In 2006, the editors of Westchester Magazine named "The Peak's 10 at 10 written, produced and hosted by Jimmy Fink. the Best Local Radio Show. It continues to be one of the most liked features of the radio station. Fink also has a free form hour of broadcasting every weeknight in a feature called "After 6."In the annual "Best of Westchester" issue, readers have voted The Peak best radio station multiple times. In 2008, 2010 and 2024 Jimmy Fink was named "Best Radio Personality" by the readers of Westchester Magazine. In 2011, Caroline Corley was named "Best Radio Personality" by the readers of Westchester Magazine. Corley repeated as "Best Radio Broadcaster" winner again in 2013, largely due to her popular "Coffee With Caroline" promotion meeting up with numerous people in the community to share coffee. Caroline once again garnered the honor of "Best Radio Broadcaster" in 2014, a posthumous tribute to her legacy. Her successor on the morning show, Chris "Coach" Rodriguez, has also been named Best Local Broadcaster in Westchester Magazine's Beast of Westchester Feature.
