= WARW =

WARW may refer to:

- WARW (FM), a radio station (96.7 FM) licensed to Port Chester, New York, United States
- WAWR, a radio station (93.5 FM) licensed to Remsen, New York, United States, which held the call sign WARW from 2015 to 2019
- WIAD, a radio station (94.7 FM) licensed to Bethesda, Maryland, United States, which held the call sign WARW from 1993 to 2007
- WWLE, a radio station (1170 AM) licensed to Cornwall, New York, United States, which held the call sign WARW from 1990 to 1993
