= WKIP =

Coordinates: 41°42′18.3″N 73°53′14.5″W

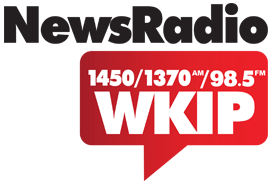
- Poughkeepsie, New York; United States
- Broadcast area: Mid-Hudson
- Frequency: 1450 kHz
- Branding: NewsRadio 1450/1370 WKIP

Programming
- Language: English
- Format: Talk radio
- Affiliations: Compass Media Networks; Fox News Radio; Premiere Networks; Westwood One

Ownership
- Owner: iHeartMedia, Inc.; (iHM Licenses, LLC)
- Sister stations: WBWZ; WCTW; WHUC; WJIP; WPKF; WRNQ; WRWB-FM; WRWD-FM; WZCR

History
- First air date: June 5, 1940
- Call sign meaning: Middle syllable of Poughkeepsie

Technical information
- Licensing authority: FCC
- Facility ID: 73163
- Class: C
- Power: 1,000 watts day; 910 watts night
- Translator: 98.5 W253BV (Poughkeepsie)
- Repeater: 1370 WJIP (Ellenville)

Links
- Public license information: Public file; LMS
- Webcast: Listen live (via iHeartRadio)
- Website: 1450wkip.iheart.com

WKIP (1450 AM) is a commercial talk radio station licensed to Poughkeepsie, New York. The station is owned by iHeartMedia, and broadcasts at 1,000 watts by day and 910 watts at night from a single tower adjacent to its studios in the Arlington section of the Town of Poughkeepsie. It uses a non-directional antenna at all times. Programming is also heard on FM translator W253BV at 98.5 MHz and on WJIP (1370 AM) in Ellenville, New York.

Most of the schedule features nationally syndicated programs, largely from co-owned Premiere Networks. Weekdays begin with Your Morning Show with Michael DelGiorno. He's followed by The Glenn Beck Radio Program, The Clay Travis and Buck Sexton Show, The Sean Hannity Show, The Mark Levin Show, The Jesse Kelly Show, Coast to Coast AM with George Noory and This Morning, America's First News with Gordon Deal. Weekends feature specialty programs including The Kim Komando Show, At Home with Gary Sullivan, The Weekend with Michael Brown, Rich DeMuro on Tech, Bill Handel on the Law, Sunday Night with Bill Cunningham, Somewhere in Time with Art Bell and The Jesus Christ Show with Neil Saavedra. Some weekend hours are paid brokered programming. Most hours begin with world and national news from Fox News Radio.

== Translator ==
To supplement coverage, WKIP programming is also heard on an FM translator station on 98.5 MHz.

Call sign	Frequency	City of license	FID	ERP (W)	Class	FCC info
W253BV	98.5 FM	Poughkeepsie, New York	138571	200	D	LMS

== History ==
=== Early years ===
Originally owned by Poughkeepsie Newspaper Incorporated, WKIP signed on the air on June 5, 1940, as the first radio station in the area. It had 250 watts of power on 1420 kilocycles. It was the first radio station in Dutchess County since the move of WOKO from Beacon to Albany a decade earlier. Like many other "local" frequency stations, the Federal Communications Commission had it move to a new frequency in 1941, after the North American Regional Broadcasting Agreement (NARBA) treaty took effect. The new frequency was 1450 kHz.

WKIP began as an affiliate of the NBC Blue Network, carrying its schedule of dramas, comedies, news, sports, game shows, soap operas and big band broadcasts during the Golden Age of Radio. In 1945, the Blue Network became today's American Broadcasting Company (ABC). WKIP's involvement with the ABC Radio Network would last for the remainder of the 20th Century.

With the shift of network programming from radio to TV, WKIP evolved into a full service middle of the road and news format in the 1950s. WKIP gained a sister station when it purchased the former WHVS at 104.7 MHz in 1958. Rechristened WKIP-FM, the station was sold a decade later and is now WSPK.

=== Top 40 era ===
WKIP maintained its original format and ownership until late 1967 when the station was sold to Star Broadcasting. Star changed the format the next year to Top 40. Around the same time, the ABC Radio Network switched to four sub-networks. WKIP signed up with the Top 40-leaning American Contemporary Network feed. The station was not successful with its new format against competitor WHVW and that October returned to its prior MOR format.

In 1970, WKIP was sold again, this time to Olympian Broadcasting (to whom Star had sold WKIP-FM to two years earlier and who would resell that station to WBNR owner Lance Broadcasting). Modifying the format to full service adult contemporary, WKIP rose from being in last place to first place with a combination of increased local involvement and help from format changes at WHVW and WEOK. This continued until the mid-1980s.

=== Switch to talk ===
When Richard Novick purchased WKIP from Olympian in 1987, assorted changes started to take place. It began with Novick allowing veteran morning host Van Risthie to leave for WHVW. This move plus the imminent decline of full-service AM formats led WKIP to go through a short-lived Fun and Games (hybrid oldies/talk) format with the station going to a talk radio format in 1989. At that time, Novick launched FM station WRNQ (92.1 FM), which had the spirit of WKIP's former format, as well as Van Ritshie. WRNQ was an automated station with no live disc jockeys. Ritshie also served as a voiceover artist for imaging for WRNQ.

The talk radio format continued through the 1990s, surviving a simulcast attempt with the Novick-controlled 96.9 MHz which also sported the WKIP-FM call sign. After Straus Media purchased Novick's stations in November 1996, elements of WKIP's programming began to be heard on sister stations in Ellenville, Hudson, and Catskill.

CBS News Justice Correspondent Scott MacFarlane began his career at WKIP in this era.

=== Adult standards ===
WKIP and all of Straus's stations were sold to Clear Channel Communications in June 2000. Clear Channel took control of the stations that October. With the ownership change came a new format, the "Music of Your Life" adult standards format, as part of the "Hudson Valley Nostalgia Network". WKIP was simulcast with WELV in Ellenville, WGHQ in Kingston, and WHUC in Hudson. Each station ran its own commercials but aired the same music.

=== Return to talk ===
The "Nostalgia Network" was dismantled in 2004 with WKIP keeping the standards format for three more years. Then in October 2007, the station returned to talk radio programming, carrying mostly shows from Clear Channel's Premiere Networks.

On June 10, 2008, WKIP dropped Quinn and Rose and began running the syndicated Don Imus morning show until October 1, 2012. At that time, Hudson Valley Focus with Tom Sipos became the station's new morning show. The morning show was later hosted by Ed Kowalski. In 2025, the local morning show ended and was replaced with a Premiere Networks wake-up show, hosted by Michael DelGiorno based at co-owned WLAC Nashville.
