= WAIP =

WAIP may refer to:

  - WAIP-LP, a low-power radio station (90.9 FM) licensed to serve Quebradillas, Puerto Rico, United States
- WHUC, a radio station (1230 AM) licensed to serve Hudson, New York, United States, which held the call sign WAIP in 2012
