= WCKL =

WCKL may refer to:

- WCKL (FM), a radio station (97.9 FM) licensed to serve Chicago, Illinois, United States
- WCKL (New York), a defunct radio station (560 AM) formerly licensed to serve Catskill, New York, United States
- WLSF, a radio station (88.3 FM) licensed to serve Starke, Florida, United States, which held the call sign WCKL-FM from 2016 to 2018
