= WRWD-FM =

Coordinates: 41.700°N 74.003°W

- Highland, New York; United States
- Broadcast area: Poughkeepsie-Newburgh-Kingston, New York
- Frequency: 107.3 MHz
- Branding: Country 107.3 WRWD

Programming
- Format: Country
- Affiliations: Premiere Networks; Westwood One

Ownership
- Owner: iHeartMedia, Inc.; (iHM Licenses, LLC)
- Sister stations: WCTW; WHUC; WPKF; WRNQ; WRWB-FM; WZCR; WBWZ; WJIP; WKIP

History
- First air date: September 1, 1989
- Call sign meaning: Rachel, William Jr, and David (the first names of original owner William H. Walker's children)

Technical information
- Licensing authority: FCC
- Facility ID: 70719
- Class: A
- ERP: 330 watts
- HAAT: 295 meters (968 ft)
- Repeaters: 99.3 WRWB-FM (Ellenville); 1230 WHUC (Hudson)

Links
- Public license information: Public file; LMS
- Webcast: Listen live (via iHeartRadio)
- Website: wrwdcountry.iheart.com

WRWD-FM (107.3 MHz, "Country 107.3") is a country music radio station licensed to Highland, New York, and primarily serving the mid-Hudson Valley of New York. The station broadcasts at 330 watts ERP from a tower near Illinois Mountain in Marlborough, New York shared with sister station WBWZ. The station is owned and operated by iHeartMedia, Inc. Its studios are in Arlington, New York.

== History ==
WRWD was put on the air in September 1989 by apple orchard owner William H. ("Bud") Walker who used the call letters to pay tribute to his children, Rachel, William Jr, and David. WRWD took on the country format long avoided by area stations at a time when past failures daunted existing owners and out-of-market stations from New York City, Albany and Hartford were garnering significant shares in the Hudson Valley. At the outset, most programming on the station was satellite fed with former WEOK personality Ken Gonyea at the helm for Mornings.

A major change took place in 1990, as Walker gave control of the station to Thom Williams who replaced Ken Gonyea in mornings and as program director while taking the station in a new country direction. WRWD at this time added an AM simulcast in WWLE (1170 AM), a daytime station licensed to Cornwall-on-Hudson which would soon take on the WRWD calls with the FM becoming suffixed. Also added were FM translators in Newburgh, Middletown, and Kingston, all of which either signed off or took on simulcasting new stations by 2000. By 1992, WRWD added former WBPM personality Mike Vincent to their afternoon roster, who later left WRWD by February 1996 for middays/Production Director for WGNY-FM 103.1 in Newburgh.

In 1996, WRWD-AM-FM and WBWZ were sold by Walker to Hudson Valley Radio Partners, a short-term holding company. The new ownership relieved morning man Terry Donovan of his duties and took the station to an all-local, current-leaning mainstream format and returned Mike Vincent to mornings from WGNY. Vincent would stay with WRWD until August 1999.

After WWLE was sold in 2000, Roberts sold the remnants of their group to Clear Channel Communications which assumed operational control in November. Under Clear Channel, WRWD became #1 in Dutchess and Ulster counties for the first time in 2002—a feat repeated several times since then.

In 2005, WRWD added another AM simulcast when WELV (1370 AM) in Ellenville changed format from standards to WRWD's country music format. Following the announcement of the proposed Clear Channel decision to be acquired by a private equity group, WRWD (AM) ended its simulcast, which moved to WRWB-FM 99.3 in Ellenville.

In 2011, Clear Channel Radio of the Hudson Valley, fired all local air talent outside of morning drive time and switched to the Premium Choice programming format (pre-recorded announcers from other markets), removing live jocks and locally programmed music.

In March 2012, CJ and Dee in the Morning were fired from their position in morning drive. They then hired Tommy Lee Walker, a former DJ to take over morning drive for a short run before they parted ways.

In June 2014, Party Marty Mitchell took over morning drive and the program director chair for WRWD. In July 2018, Party Marty Mitchell was let go and was replaced in mornings with The Bobby Bones Show. In September 2018, Chase Daniels (formerly of Saga Communications' WQNY in Ithaca) came on board to replace iHeart Premium Choice talent Boxer in the afternoon and Marty Mitchell's role as program director.

On July 1, 2019, Beth Christy (formerly of crosstown Townsquare Media-owned WKXP/WZAD) returned to WRWD to host the midday show replacing iHeart Premium Choice talent Billy Greenwood.
