= WELV-LP =

- Ellenville, New York; United States
- Frequency: 107.9 MHz

Programming
- Format: Adult hits

Ownership
- Owner: Ellenville Central School District

History
- First air date: 2005
- Call sign meaning: Ellenville

Technical information
- Licensing authority: FCC
- Facility ID: 131711
- Class: L1
- ERP: 100 watts
- HAAT: −122.7 meters (−403 ft)
- Transmitter coordinates: 41°43′07″N 74°23′21″W

Links
- Public license information: LMS
- Webcast: Listen live
- Website: www.ecs.k12.ny.us/page/welvch20

WELV-LP (107.9 FM) is a low-power FM radio station broadcasting an adult hits music format. Licensed to Ellenville, New York, United States, the station is owned by Ellenville Central School District.

== History ==
The Federal Communications Commission issued a construction permit for the station on October 29, 2003. The station was assigned the WELV-LP call sign on December 13, 2004, began testing in April 2005, and received its license to cover on September 30, 2005. The station's call sign dates back to the early 1960s, when it was originated by Ellenville's commercial station (now WRWD (AM)), and often used by its FM sister station (now WRWB-FM). The station is operated by Ellenville Central School District students and staff, who developed the station as an extension of the existing cable television programming, which included WELV's precursor, Radio Ellenville. The station's morning show, "Dennis In The Morning," debuted in February 2006, hosted by Dennis Warner and ECSD broadcasting students. Warner and the show have won regional awards from Hudson Valley Magazine in 2006 and 2007, and the Times Herald-Record in 2008.
