= Jimmy Fink =

American radio personality

- Born: Eastchester, New York, U.S.
- Education: American University (B.A.. Communications, 1971)
- Occupations: Radio personality, writer, producer
- Known for: New York rock radio
- Spouse: Debbie Fink
- Children: 3
- Website: www.jimmyfink.com

Jimmy Fink is a New York metropolitan area radio personality, producer and writer.

== Early life and education ==
Fink was born in NYC and raised in Eastchester, New York. His family owned the Fink Baking Corp., a New York City-based company which operated in Manhattan and Long Island City from 1888 to 2000.

Fink studied drama at the University of Arizona from 1967–69 and received a BA degree in Speech Arts/Communications from The American University in Washington DC in 1971. While at American University, he participated in the early development of the school's radio station, WAMU-FM, and worked at rock station WHFS in Bethesda Maryland. From 1971–72, as a graduate student, he studied electronic music at The New School for Social Research in New York City.

== Career ==
Fink began his professional radio career in the fledgling days of New York FM radio at WABC-FM, which later became WPLJ. From 1970-83 he worked for WPLJ as an on-air personality, and is one of the better-known on-air personalities in New York FM radio. In 1985, he was the first New York air personality to join the new K-Rock, WXRK, in New York City.

Fink has also done voiceover work for HBO, Cinemax and various other commercial clients. He was the longtime producer for various nationally syndicated shows on the ABC Rock Radio Network, including Rock & Roll Legends, a daily calendar of rock events, and New Waves, an interview program distributed by NPR focusing on rock stars' youth and upbringing. Rolling Stone Magazine's Continuous History of Rock & Roll, written and produced by Fink, was heard worldwide on 160 radio stations. His interviews with rock stars have been featured in hundreds of radio programs. He was the host of Rock Watch, a nationally syndicated show for the United Stations Radio Network.

In 2004, he became the afternoon drivetime host on 107.1 The Peak, WXPK-FM a suburban New York radio station owned by Pamal Broadcasting. Fink currently hosts the afternoon drive show on 107.1 The Peak and hosts, writes and produce the 10@10, a daily program heard at 10 AM & 10 PM on 107.1 The Peak featuring "ten great songs from one great year." His daily "After 6" program is one of the last bastions of free form radio on the air.

== Honors and awards ==
In July 2008, and again in 2010 & 2024, Fink was named "Best Radio Personality" by the readers of Westchester Magazine in its annual "Best of Westchester" issue.
