= WLNA =

Simulcast of WGHQ Kingston
- Peekskill, New York; United States
- Broadcast area: Hudson Valley
- Frequency: 1420 kHz
- Branding: The Beacon

Programming
- Format: Conservative Talk
- Affiliations: Fox News Radio; Salem Radio Network; Westwood One; Army Black Knights football; New York Knicks; New York Rangers

Ownership
- Owner: Pamal Broadcasting; (6 Johnson Road Licenses, Inc.)
- Sister stations: WBNR; WBPM; WGHQ; WHUD; WSPK; WXPK

History
- First air date: December 22, 1948
- Call sign meaning: "Local News Authority"

Technical information
- Licensing authority: FCC
- Facility ID: 54852
- Class: B
- Power: 5,000 watts (day); 1,000 watts (night)
- Transmitter coordinates: 41°18′31.34″N 73°54′58.5″W
- Translator: 94.3 W232DQ (Peekskill)

Links
- Public license information: Public file; LMS
- Website: hvbeacon.com

WLNA (1420 AM) is a commercial radio station licensed to Peekskill, New York, and serving the Hudson Valley. The station is owned by Pamal Broadcasting, and branded "The Beacon". It simulcasts a conservative talk radio format with sister stations WBNR in Beacon and WGHQ in Kingston. Its studios are on New York State Route 52 in Beacon.

WLNA is powered at 5,000 watts by day. At night, to protect other stations on 1420 AM from interference, it reduces power to 1,000 watts using a directional antenna with a five-tower array. The station's transmitter is just north of Peekskill in the Town of Cortlandt, New York. (The day and night patterns use two different arrays of three towers, with only one tower shared by both arrays.) Programming is also heard on one-watt FM translator W232DQ at 94.3 MHz.

== Programming ==
Weekdays on "The Beacon" (WLNA, WBNR and WGHQ) begin with a local news and interview show, Hudson Valley Focus with Tom Sipos. The rest of the day, nationally syndicated programs are heard: Brian Kilmeade, Dan Bongino, Charlie Kirk, Joe Pags, Bill O'Reilly, America at Night with Rick Valdés, Red Eye Radio and America in the Morning. Weekends feature specialty shows on travel, golf, cars and guns. Syndicated weekend hosts include Dave Ramsey, Larry Elder, Hugh Hewitt, Mike Gallagher, Rudy Maxa and Eric Metaxas.

The Beacon carries live sports including New York Rangers hockey, New York Knicks basketball and Army Black Knights football from nearby West Point.

== History ==
=== Early years ===
WLNA signed on the air on December 22, 1948. It was originally a daytimer, with 500 watts of power by day and required to go off the air at night. It used a single tower, located on Radio Terrace in the Town of Cortlandt.

From the 1950s until the 1980s, it was a full service middle of the road AM station with heavy emphasis on local news and community events. A typical broadcast day had local news at the top and bottom of the hour, farm reports, local weather, and recorded or live music in between.

During the Peekskill riots on September 4, 1949, WLNA was requested by State Police and City of Peekskill officials to stay on the air past its 6 p.m. sign off time. It was used to broadcast emergency information to local residents and persons traveling into the area who may have not been aware of the situation. The Riots took place near Van Cortlandtville, about 2 miles west of the station.

In 1951, the station increased power to 1,000 watts. In 1958 WLNA-FM 100.7 signed on as a simulcast of the AM station. After sign-off time, WLNA-FM continued on-the-air until about midnight, allowing its programming to be heard in the evening when the AM station was silent. On October 24, 1971, WLNA-FM changed its call letters to WHUD. In 1972 the simulcast ended as FM signal split off and launched a beautiful music format, syndicated from Bonneville International.

Throughout the 1970s, WLNA continued its full service format. It switched from its Middle of the Road music to easy listening.

=== Signal upgrade and sale ===
In 1980, WLNA applied to the Federal Communications Commission for a signal upgrade to 5,000 watts daytime and 1,000 watts night time power. This would entail moving the transmitter site about 1/2-mile south and putting up a five tower directional antenna array. The station owners, Highland Broadcasting, battled the Town of Cortlandt zoning board all the way to the New York State Supreme Court over a zoning variance for use of the new transmitter site. The Supreme Court sided with the radio station, and construction was finished in late 1981.

Despite the power upgrade, the station's signal was still difficult to hear in parts of its service area. With the decline of AM radio, more resources were put into its sister FM station WHUD.

Highland Broadcasting sold both WLNA and WHUD to Radio Terrace, Inc., in 1982. Radio Terrace also owned WROW and WROW-FM in Albany, New York. Radio Terrace sold WROW-AM-FM to Albany Broadcasting, predecessor of Pamal Broadcasting in December 1993. Pamal acquired WLNA and WHUD in 1997.

=== Real Country, classic hits and conservative talk ===
On March 24, 2014, WLNA and WBNR introduced the "Real Country" national music format. The stations played classic country hits from the 1960s through the 90s. On March 15, 2021, WLNA and WBNR changed their format from classic country to a simulcast of co-owned classic hits station WBPM in Saugerties.

On October 14, 2024, WLNA changed its format again, ending the classic hits simulcast of WBPM. WLNA, WBNR and WGHQ began airing a conservative talk format, branded as "The Beacon". It began airing syndicated talk shows from Westwood One and carrying ABC News Radio for national news updates.

== Translator ==
Broadcast translator for WLNA
Call sign	Frequency	City of license	FID	ERP (W)	Class	Transmitter coordinates	FCC info
W232DQ	94.3 FM	Peekskill, New York	202878	1	D	41°20′18″N 73°53′39″W	LMS
