= WPKF =

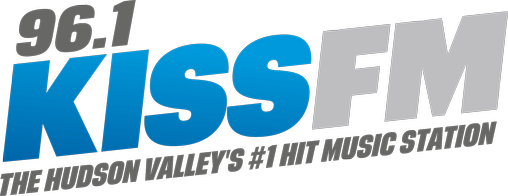
- Poughkeepsie, New York; United States
- Broadcast area: Poughkeepsie-Newburgh-Kingston, New York
- Frequency: 96.1 MHz
- Branding: 96.1 KISS-FM

Programming
- Format: Top 40 (CHR)
- Affiliations: Premiere Networks

Ownership
- Owner: iHeartMedia, Inc.; (iHM Licenses, LLC)
- Sister stations: WCTW; WHUC; WRNQ; WRWB-FM; WRWD-FM; WBWZ; WJIP; WKIP; WZCR

History
- First air date: October 11, 1996
- Former call signs: WALQ (1996, CP); WNSX (1996–97); WTND (1997–99); WCTJ (1999–2001)
- Call sign meaning: Poughkeepsie Kiss FM

Technical information
- Licensing authority: FCC
- Facility ID: 72380
- Class: A
- ERP: 3,500 watts
- HAAT: 81 meters (266 ft)
- Transmitter coordinates: 41.7379°N 73.9051°W

Links
- Public license information: Public file; LMS
- Webcast: Listen live (via iHeartRadio)
- Website: kissfmhv.iheart.com

WPKF (96.1 FM, "Kiss FM") is a rhythmic-leaning top 40 (CHR) radio station licensed to Poughkeepsie, New York and serving the Mid-Hudson Valley of New York state. The station is owned by iHeartMedia, Inc. Its studios are located on Tucker Drive in Poughkeepsie, and its transmitter is located on Ryon Drive in the same city.

== History ==
The 96.1 frequency was granted as a construction permit in 1995 to WRNQ/WKIP owner Richard Novik. In early 1996, the frequency planned to use the WALQ calls, however that August those calls were replaced by WNSX (Ninety Six) as the station prepared to sign on the air. Two months later, the 96.1 frequency came to life as "Modern Rock, The X 96.1", with The Greaseman in mornings and ABC's "MR-35" format the rest of the day.

Two months after WNSX signed on, Richard Novik sold his station cluster to Straus Media and the future of the modern rock format began to unravel. The X did not fit in with the country-oriented Straus strategy and the station flipped to country as "Thunder Country" WTND. WNSX did quite well for a new signal in its only book on the air, but it was too late to turn back.

Being mostly satellite-fed (Westwood One "Hot Country") and in a quasi-network with WTHK in Hudson and WTHN in Ellenville, WTND seemed to make economic sense for Straus at the outset. In reality, the format failed badly against the heritage, better programmed and better-promoted WRWD-FM and sunk to the bottom of the ratings. After nearly being de-listed from the Poughkeepsie Arbitron ratings, WTND was flipped to hot adult contemporary "The Cat" WCTJ on August 9, 1999, after a weekend of stunting with clips from the Bob & Sheri morning show.

Initially, WCTJ was to be a simulcast of sister station WCTW in Catskill, however by September it was ironed out into a mutual simulcast. Instead of simulcasting WCTW to points south (as had been done a year prior via translator in Poughkeepsie), the two stations existed on their own albeit with the same music and DJs on a slight delay with different promotions and a nighttime split where WCTW aired Delilah (heard in Poughkeepsie on WRNQ). Balancing the two different markets and keeping everything running was problematic and WCTJ's ratings and revenue remained weak in relation to the work needed for the simulcast.

Straus Media sold its stations to Clear Channel Communications in 2000 and, after buying rival Roberts Radio, WCTJ was put under the same roof as rival WBWZ. After WCTW split off on its own after Clear Channel took control of the stations at the start of November, WCTJ was left on its own amid format-flip rumors. On December 22, rumors became fact when WCTJ and WTHN entered joint stunting as "Variety 96 & 99" and eventually launched as Rhythmic Top 40 that afternoon using Clear Channel's KissFM brand.

In March 2005, WFKP in Ellenville dropped the Kiss-FM format amid dismal ratings and flipped to a virtual simulcast of WRNQ's "LiteFM" format. The change had no effect on WPKF's Dutchess County ratings.

Instability and many changes were still to come. In September 2005, Kiss added Matt Bosso as afternoon host, but he moved on shortly afterwards to join the then-syndicated Wake Up with Whoopi in August 2006. More changes to Kiss came in 2007 as programmer Jimi Jamm left radio to embark on a career in music promotion. Aaron McCord became Kiss-FM's third program director, but left music programming responsibilities to CJ McIntyre. Then in 2008, yet more changes came to the station, with morning/APD CJ McIntyre becoming program director while continuing to host "CJ's Playhouse. Still more changes in late 2009 saw CJ's Playhouse come to end and the syndicated Elvis Duran and the Morning Show replaced local programming, as did On Air with Ryan Seacrest middays; local programming on the station continued with Chris Marino afternoons (who also served as program director and music director) and Fuzzy & Choco at night. CJ was moved to WRWD's morning show.

Then in January 2011, Chris Marino left WPKF to do the morning show on WBWZ, and Fuzzy moved to afternoons for a short time and Choco became the night DJ, with a 5 p.m. to 7 p.m. overlap with both Fuzzy & Choco.

In September 2011, WPKF fired local air talent except Chris Marino and began largely carrying Clear Channel's Premium Choice programming format with pre-recorded DJs from other markets, and eliminated locally programmed music in favor of programming from corporate headquarters in San Antonio, Texas.
