= WZCR =

Coordinates: 42.254°N 73.762°W

- Hudson, New York; United States
- Broadcast area: Upper Hudson Valley, lower Capital District
- Frequency: 93.5 MHz
- Branding: Oldies 93.5

Programming
- Format: Oldies
- Affiliations: Premiere Networks

Ownership
- Owner: iHeartMedia; (iHM Licenses, LLC)
- Sister stations: WJIP; WKIP; WRNQ; WPKF; WRWD-FM; WHUC; WBWZ; WCTW; WRWB-FM

History
- First air date: 1968 (as WHUC-FM)
- Former call signs: WHUC-FM (1968–1981); WRVW (1981–1995); WTHK (1995–2001)
- Call sign meaning: Cruisin' (former branding)

Technical information
- Licensing authority: FCC
- Facility ID: 63532
- Class: A
- ERP: 5,800 watts
- HAAT: −5 meters (−16 ft)

Links
- Public license information: Public file; LMS
- Webcast: Listen live (via iHeartRadio)
- Website: oldies935.iheart.com

WZCR (93.5 FM, "Oldies 93.5") is an oldies radio station licensed to Hudson, New York, and serving Columbia and Greene counties as well as the upper Hudson Valley, the southern Capital District, and Berkshire County, Massachusetts. The station is owned by iHeartMedia and broadcasts from a tower located near the Hudson River in Hudson.

== History ==
WZCR signed on in 1969 as WHUC-FM, sister to WHUC and the first FM station between Kingston and Albany. Initially airing automated easy listening music, the station would flip to a simulcast of WHUC's successful Top 40 format by 1971, a format it would keep for the next decade. During this time, it was not uncommon for the WHUC stations to appear in the ratings for the Albany market to the point that some Albany businesses advertised on the stations.

With the Federal Communications Commission requiring stations to stop simulcasting, the simulcast was broken in April 1981 with WHUC-FM flipping to automated adult contemporary programming from Drake-Chenault and taking the WRVW calls. This format was selected by the station's current general manager. The station would take several variations of AC before flipping to country in 1988. Country would only last a couple of years before the station went through a variety of formats, including standards, big band, and an oldies format called 93Gold FM.

WRVW's oldies format was never a winning proposition, with two strong Albany oldies stations, WGY-FM and WTRY dominating the Hudson market. This would continue until early 1995 when Straus Media, owners of WCTW and WCKL in Catskill, bought WHUC and WRVW. Straus had earlier purchased WELV and WWWK in Ellenville and all those stations, with the exception of WELV moved to the studios on Route 9G in Hudson.

In early 1995, WRVW and WWWK joined together as "Thunder Country", a satellite-fed "Hot Country" format; with this format change, WRVW took the WTHK calls. WTHK struggled against WGNA-FM to the north and WRWD to the south, however the station did last out the 1990s. It was in 1997 that Straus's Hudson/Catskill stations were relocated to the company's Poughkeepsie headquarters, a move met with some local criticism.

The sale of Straus Media to iHeartMedia (then known as Clear Channel Communications) in 2000 led to the divestiture of the Hudson/Catskill stations and WBPM in Kingston to Concord Media, an affiliated holding company. With this sale came the relocation of WTHK and its sister stations to its old facility in Hudson along with a format change that November to an oldies format with the WZCR calls soon following. Clear Channel would later buy the Hudson/Catskill stations (except WCKL) in early 2003 with satellite-fed programming being soon replaced. WZCR would drop satellite broadcasting and go local in January 2005. The station continues to be a strong ratings leader with the oldies format.

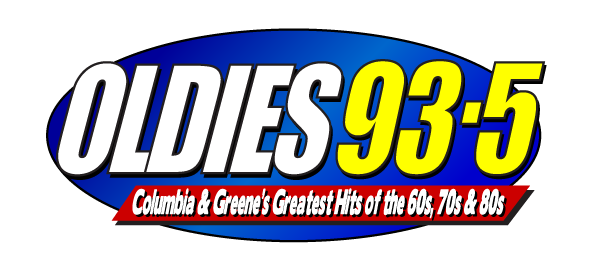
Former logo from 2013-2021

On two occasions (in 2004 and 2005), WZCR was simulcast on WCKL as filler programming while Clear Channel unsuccessfully tried to sell that station due to market concentration concerns.
