= WGHQ =

- Kingston, New York; United States
- Broadcast area: Hudson Valley
- Frequency: 920 kHz
- Branding: The Beacon

Programming
- Language: English
- Format: Conservative talk radio
- Affiliations: Fox News Radio; Salem Radio Network; Westwood One; Army Black Knights football; New York Knicks; New York Rangers Radio Network

Ownership
- Owner: Pamal Broadcasting
- Sister stations: WBNR; WLNA; WBPM; WHUD; WSPK

History
- First air date: March 4, 1956
- Former call signs: WSKN (1956–1959)
- Call sign meaning: "General Headquarters"

Technical information
- Licensing authority: FCC
- Facility ID: 27396
- Class: D
- Power: 1,000 watts (day); 38 watts (night)
- Transmitter coordinates: 41°53′13.3″N 73°58′15.5″W
- Translator: 92.5 W223CR (Kingston)

Links
- Public license information: Public file; LMS
- Webcast: Listen live
- Website: www.hvbeacon.com

WGHQ (920 kHz) is a commercial AM radio station licensed to Kingston, New York, and serving the Hudson Valley. WGHQ is owned by Pamal Broadcasting and it simulcasts a conservative talk radio format known as "The Beacon" with sister stations WLNA (1420 AM) in Peekskill and WBNR (1260 AM) in Beacon. The studios are on New York State Route 52 in Beacon.

By day, WGHQ is powered at 1,000 watts; at night, to protect other stations on 920 AM from interference, power is reduced to 38 watts. It broadcasts a non-directional signal from a single tower located south of Port Ewen, New York. WGHQ also broadcasts on FM translator W223CR Port Ewen, at 92.5 MHz.

== Programming ==
Weekdays on "The Beacon" (WGHQ, WBNR and WLNA) begin with a local news and interview show, Hudson Valley Focus with Tom Sipos. The rest of the day, nationally syndicated programs are heard: Brian Kilmeade, Dan Bongino, Charlie Kirk, Joe Pags, Bill O'Reilly, America at Night with Rick Valdés, Red Eye Radio and America in the Morning. Weekends feature specialty shows on travel, golf, cars and guns. Syndicated weekend hosts include Dave Ramsey, Larry Elder, Hugh Hewitt, Mike Gallagher, Rudy Maxa and Eric Metaxas.

The Beacon carries live sports including New York Rangers hockey, New York Knicks basketball and Army Black Knights football from nearby West Point.

== History ==
=== WSKN ===
The station first signed on the air on March 4, 1956. The call letters were WSKN. The original city of license was Saugerties, New York, a small community in Ulster County.

The station had 1,000 watts of power and was a daytimer, required to go off the air at night. Its transmitter and studio were located on the Glasco Turnpike, in the Town of Saugerties.

=== WGHQ ===
In 1959, the call letters were changed to WGHQ. The city of license was changed to Kingston and the transmitter site was moved to U.S. Route 9W, just south of Port Ewen. The station's operating power was increased to 5,000 watts, still as a daytimer.

WGHQ was the second radio station licensed to Kingston (after WKNY). In 1965, WGHQ-FM 94.3 (later the original WBPM, now WKXP) was licensed. It was a full-time simulcast of the AM's programming for much of the next decade.

=== AC, standards and talk ===
Rising costs and the decline of full service formats on AM forced the station to drop much of its news coverage. It changed to an adult contemporary music format. In 1988, WGHQ was licensed for 78 watts nighttime power; however, the station dropped local programming, going instead to mainly satellite syndicated music programming.

WGHQ aired adult standards for most of the 1990s. In 1999, the family sold WGHQ and WBPM to WRWD/WBWZ local radio owner Roberts Radio Group. This began a period of multiple format changes. Roberts Radio sold to Clear Channel Communications in mid-2000. WGHQ became a talk radio station under Clear Channel ownership, airing syndicated talk shows including Rush Limbaugh and Glenn Beck. WGHQ along with WBPM (92.9 FM) was sold to Pamal Broadcasting in April 2007.

Pamal Broadcasting changed the format from talk radio back to adult standards in July 2007, simulcasting with co-owned WBNR and WLNA. Pamal kept locally originated "Kingston Community Radio", produced by Walter Maxwell, in its 7-9 am time slot. In March 2008, the trimulcast of WBNR, WLNA and WGHQ changed to a service-oriented talk radio format under the name "Hudson Valley Talk Radio". HVTR featured non-political syndicated advice hosts Gary Goldberg (financial), Dr. Laura Schlesinger and Dr. Joy Browne (life advice), Dave Ramsey (money management) as well as local experts under time brokered arrangements.

=== Robin Hood Radio and Real Country ===
On December 20, 2013, Pamal announced that Tri-State Public Communications would acquire WGHQ through a donation. Tri-State operates WHDD AM–FM in Sharon, Connecticut, and WLHV in Annandale-on-Hudson as public radio station Robin Hood Radio. As of January 1, 2014, WGHQ was re-transmitting Robin Hood Radio programming except during "Kingston Community Radio"'s morning timeslot. A local marketing agreement (LMA) was in effect until paperwork was filed and approved by the Federal Communications Commission (FCC) for the donation of WGHQ to Robin Hood Radio.

On March 1, 2016, Tri-State Public Communications ended its lease of the station. Pamal Broadcasting took back programming control of WGHQ. It resumed simulcasting with WBNR and WLNA, airing the syndicated "Real Country" classic country music format.

=== Removal of towers ===
On June 28, 2016, Pamal Broadcasting removed two of three towers at the WGHQ transmitter site due to the poor physical condition of the towers. The station power was reduced to 1,000 watts daytime, 38 watts nighttime non-directional from the remaining tower. In January 2017, Pamal Broadcasting acquired an FM translator at 92.5 FM to simulcast WGHQ's programming. WGHQ continued its syndicated "Real Country" format.

On March 15, 2021, in a move to better use the AM frequencies and their FM translators, Pamal relaunched WGHQ on its own with a soft oldies and standards format. It was rebranded as "Magic 92.5" playing "Great Songs and Magic Memories" from pop vocalists of the 1950s through the 1980s. Meanwhile, sister stations WBNR and WLNA began simulcasting WBPM's classic hits format in areas south of Kingston.

=== The Beacon ===
On October 14, 2024, WGHQ changed formats from soft oldies to conservative talk, branded as "The Beacon"; it resumed simulcasting with WBNR and WLNA.

Syndicated hosts on "The Beacon" include Brian Kilmeade, Dan Bongino and Bill O'Reilly. A local three-hour morning show airs on weekdays, Hudson Valley Focus with Tom Sipos.
