= WDEK =

Coordinates: 33°58′17″N 81°16′43″W

- Lexington, South Carolina; United States
- Broadcast area: Columbia metropolitan area
- Frequency: 1170 kHz
- Branding: Columbia's Praise

Programming
- Format: Urban gospel

Ownership
- Owner: The Meeting Place Church of Greater Columbia

History
- First air date: 1983 (as WXAX)
- Former call signs: WXAX (1983–1988); WLGO (1988–2005); WQVA (2005–2010)
- Call sign meaning: W DEcK (former branding)

Technical information
- Licensing authority: FCC
- Facility ID: 250
- Class: D
- Power: 10,000 watts day 2,500 watts critical hours
- Translator: 95.7 W239DA (Columbia)

Links
- Public license information: Public file; LMS
- Webcast: Listen live
- Website: columbiaspraise.com

WDEK (1170 AM) is a daytimer radio station licensed to Lexington, South Carolina and serving the Columbia area. It is owned by the Meeting Place Church of Greater Columbia and airs an urban gospel radio format, along with some Christian talk and teaching programs aimed at Columbia's African-American community. The station solicits donations on the air and on its website.

Its studios and offices are located at 201 Columbia Mall Blvd., Suite 185. This property was formerly part of the Columbia Mall property and is now owned by the Meeting Place Church of Greater Columbia. WDEK brands itself on-air as "Columbia's Praise."

By day, WDEK is powered at 10,000 watts, using a non-directional antenna. Because AM 1170 is a clear channel frequency, WDEK must sign off at sunset to avoid interfering with the Class A station WWVA in Wheeling and KFAQ in Tulsa. During critical hours, the station is powered at 2,500 watts. WDEK’s programming can be heard around the clock on FM translator W239DA at 95.7 MHz.

AM 1170 signed on as WXAX in late 1983 with a country music format. The station became WLGO in 1988 with automated adult contemporary music. This lasted until the early 1990s, when the station switched to a Christian radio format.

In 2005, the station was sold and the format was changed to Spanish Contemporary music under the "Radio Ritmo" handle. The new call letters became WQVA.

The station was owned by Peregon Communications, which in 2008 simulcast "Radio Ritmo" on WIGL/St. Matthews under a local marketing agreement (LMA).

In November 2010, the station was in receivership with a request to transfer the license to Broomfield Broadcasting of Greenwood, South Carolina. Broomfield also owned radio station WCZZ. Under Broomfield ownership, the station changed its call sign to WDEK, calling itself "1170 The Deck."

WDEK's previous format was urban oldies as "Jammin' Hits 97.9 & 1170," adding FM translator W250CG at 97.9 MHz.

Effective May 10, 2021, Broomfield Broadcasting sold WDEK and W250CG to the Meeting Place Church of Greater Columbia for $475,000. Under the leadership of Bishop Eric J. Freeman, the station adopted an urban gospel format branded as "Columbia's Praise." The FM translator frequency was changed to 95.7 FM. The station now serves as a cornerstone of The Meeting Place Church’s community engagement initiatives, broadcasting faith-based programming and gospel music.
