= WRNQ =

Coordinates: 41.719°N 73.996°W

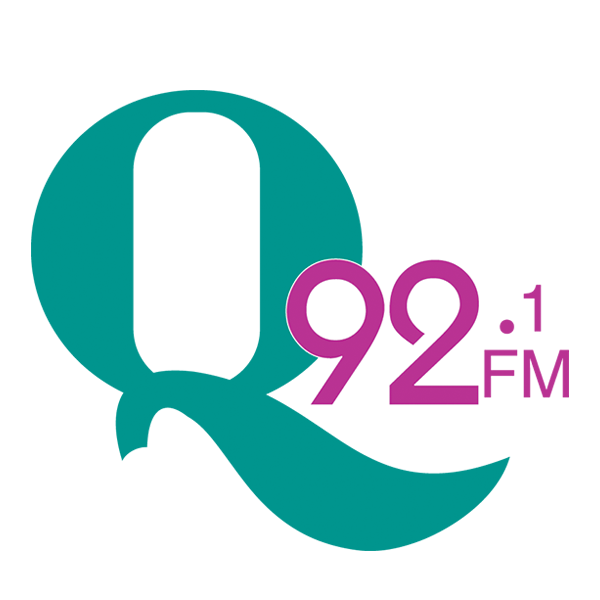
- Poughkeepsie, New York; United States
- Broadcast area: Hudson Valley
- Frequency: 92.1 MHz
- Branding: Q92

Programming
- Format: Adult contemporary
- Affiliations: Premiere Networks

Ownership
- Owner: iHeartMedia, Inc.; (iHM Licenses, LLC)
- Sister stations: WCTW; WHUC; WPKF; WRWB-FM; WRWD-FM

History
- First air date: June 30, 1989
- Former call signs: WLMS (1985–89, CP)
- Call sign meaning: "Rockin' Easy, Q-92" (original branding)

Technical information
- Licensing authority: FCC
- Facility ID: 17771
- Class: A
- ERP: 520 watts
- HAAT: 314 meters (1,030 ft)

Links
- Public license information: Public file; LMS
- Webcast: Listen live (via iHeartRadio)
- Website: q92hv.iheart.com

WRNQ (92.1 FM "Q92") is a commercial radio station licensed to Poughkeepsie, New York, United States, and serving the Mid-Hudson Valley of New York state. The station is owned by iHeartMedia, Inc. and broadcasts an adult contemporary radio format, switching to Christmas music for much of November and December. Its studios are located on Tucker Drive in Poughkeepsie, and it transmits from the Illinois Mountain master tower in Highland, New York, to which it moved in 2000.

WRNQ has an effective radiated power of 520 watts. Unlike other Class A stations on the Illinois Mountain tower, WRNQ's signal is directional to protect two first adjacent stations on 92.3: WINS-FM in New York City and WFLY in Troy, New York.

== History ==
The original construction permit for what became WRNQ was awarded in December 1985, several years after the Federal Communications Commission amended the table of allotments to allow for the 92.1 frequency to become active in Poughkeepsie. Around 1987, the frequency was awarded to WKIP owner Richard Novik, gained the WLMS ("Lite Music Station") calls and announced that the station would take on a format near-identical to that which hit the air. Due to potential ratings confusion with WLTW ("Lite FM") from New York City the call letters were replaced with WRNQ in 1989, a decision made by then-general manager Don Verity. The difficulty obtaining a transmitter site in the market also was a problem and Novik eventually settled on a site in Lagrangeville, New York, east of Poughkeepsie, unlike most stations which broadcast on mountain peaks in Ulster County.

WRNQ, better known as "Rockin' Easy, Q-92", hit the air on June 30, 1989, and made a splash with former WKIP morning man Van Ritshie anchoring an otherwise satellite-fed format (Unistar's "Format 41"). With no real competition in the format (WHUD was still easy listening and WKIP had changed to all-talk programming), Q-92 reached top of the ratings its first year on the air. Eventually, the station added the hugely successful "Love Songs on Q" a locally hosted evening love songs program hosted by Pete Clark (currently at WVKR-FM and WPDH) and later by Rick Buser, formerly of WPDH.

In 1996, Novik sold WRNQ, WKIP, and new sister station WNSX ("Modern Rock, The X 96.1") to Straus Media (owned by Eric Straus, heir to former owner of WMCA in New York City) who in turn replaced the satellite-fed time periods with all-local programming, much of which came from Straus stations in Ellenville and Hudson. With this, the station picked up Delilah After Dark evenings. The pickup of Delilah, later picked up by rival WHUD, was allowed via a geographic loophole (WHUD and WRNQ are technically in different markets) which also allowed the two rivals to have the same jingle package for several years.

Eric Straus decided to leave radio ownership in 2000 to start two online ventures (Regional Help Wanted and Cupid.com), selling the cluster to Clear Channel Communications. The next year, Van Ritshie retired from radio, and was replaced by Joe Daily (formerly of WBNR) in the morning slot. In 2002, WRNQ began airing Christmas music in the months before Christmas copying a programming move popular in other radio markets.

WRNQ's logo under previous "Lite FM" branding

At the end of Christmas music in 2003, the station relaunched under the "LiteFM" brand of popular sister WLTW in New York City—the same station that it sought to avoid confusion with in 1989—in a move of "branding unity". Outside of some music refocusing and the addition of a Saturday night dance program, no major changes were made until October 2011, when WRNQ switched to Premium Choice and Premiere Networks for content outside of Joe Daily's morning show.

A variation of WRNQ's format, without the simulcast and with different disc jockeys, had been broadcast on WCTW in Catskill, New York. From March 2005 until November 2006, WRNQ's format and programming was "shadowcast" on WFKP in Ellenville, New York, which aired the same air talent as WRNQ (and carried WRNQ's "Joe Daily in the Morning").

On September 8, 2014, WRNQ returned to its original "Q92" branding.
