= WHUD =

Radio station in Peekskill, New York

- Peekskill, New York; United States
- Broadcast area: Hudson Valley
- Frequency: 100.7 MHz
- Branding: 100.7 WHUD

Programming
- Format: Hot adult contemporary
- Affiliations: Compass Media Networks

Ownership
- Owner: Pamal Broadcasting; (6 Johnson Road Licenses, Inc.)
- Sister stations: WBNR; WBPM; WGHQ; WLNA; WSPK; WXPK

History
- First air date: October 24, 1958
- Former call signs: WLNA-FM (1958–1971)
- Call sign meaning: Hudson

Technical information
- Licensing authority: FCC
- Facility ID: 54854
- Class: B
- ERP: 50,000 watts
- HAAT: 152 meters (499 ft)
- Transmitter coordinates: 41°20′18.3″N 73°53′39.4″W

Links
- Public license information: Public file; LMS
- Webcast: Listen live
- Website: www.whud.com

WHUD (100.7 FM) is a commercial radio station licensed to Peekskill, New York. It airs an hot adult contemporary format, with an empahsis of music from the 1990s. WHUD is owned by Pamal Broadcasting and broadcasts at 50,000 watts ERP. The station's transmitter facility is located in Philipstown, New York, and its studios are located on Route 52 in Beacon, New York, along with other Hudson Valley Pamal stations. WHUD is responsible for the activation of the Hudson Valley area Emergency Alert System.

== History ==
In early 1957, Highland Broadcasting, owner of WLNA, began petitioning the Federal Communications Commission to grant a class B FM allocation to the City of Peekskill, New York. In the petition, Highland noted that there were no class B FM allotments between Poughkeepsie and New York City, that the far flung northern suburbs were rather heavily populated, not all of the area was covered by FM signals, and it was culturally unique from New York City.

Initially, it was thought that 106.7 MHz would fit in with the stations already licensed to New York City. However, by March 1957 that frequency had already been applied for by the Riverside Church in New York City. After some frequency shuffling between the cities of New Haven, Connecticut and Waterbury, Connecticut, 100.7 MHz was allotted to Peekskill, New York on May 24, 1957.

WLNA-FM signed on for the first time on October 24, 1958, as the second FM station between New York City and Albany, New York. The format was a 100% simulcast of WLNA. During this time, the FM station's main source of revenue was a Muzak Subcarrier.

The first major changes to the station occurred in late 1971. On October 14, 1971, the call sign was changed to WHUD. In December 1971, WHUD increased its power from 20 KW to 50 KW ERP. In February 1972, the simulcast with WLNA ended, WHUD began broadcasting in stereo, and launched a beautiful music format.

The Bonneville format consisted largely of instrumental covers of pop songs with some vocal standards. Some adult contemporary artists were mixed into the music rotation with one vocal track per 15 minutes under the work of Program Director (and morning personality) Joe O'Brien. Prior to his work at WHUD, O'Brien was one of the WMCA Good Guys and had been doing mornings on the New York City station since the early 60s.

During this early period, WHUD branded its format as Music From the Terrace, a term named for the location of WHUD's studios on Radio Terrace, (41°18′46.04″N 73°54′58.2552″W) a public street in the town of Cortlandt, New York.

In 1982, Highland Broadcasting sold WHUD and WLNA to Radio Terrace, Inc. The format remained unchanged, however, more resources were diverted away from WLNA in favor of WHUD as AM radio began to decline.

In 1986, Joe O'Brien retired and was replaced by longtime New York City radio personality Ed Baer. Baer spent a total of 18 years broadcasting in the New York City market, also as one of the WMCA good guys then on country station WHN and later on WYNY He stayed in the morning show position until he retired for the second time in 2000. Ed Baer was replaced by longtime news director Mike Bennett who got his start at Hudson Valley radio station WHVW in the early 1970s.

1986 was also the year that WHUD began to equal out the vocal/instrumental ratio to the point that by early 1990 it was an even split. However, the declining demographics and audience of the beautiful music format led WHUD to eliminate instrumental covers with little fanfare, evolving into a soft adult contemporary format. Throughout the first half of the 1990s, WHUD would continue evolving to a wide play list adult contemporary format.

In 1997, WHUD was sold to Albany, New York–based Pamal Broadcasting. The studios were moved from Radio Terrace to the newly reconstructed "Broadcast Center" on NY Route 52, in the town of Fishkill, New York.

== Programming ==
After the ownership transfer, Pamal altered the format with a slight recurrent lean to the play list and the addition of the Delilah show in evening time slot in spite of the same program being cleared on the Poughkeepsie-based WRNQ. This geographic loophole also led to the stations sharing a jingle package for several years. Regardless, WHUD dropped Delilah in September 2006 and replaced her with a live and local evening program called Night Rhythms hosted by Catherine Michaels. (The Delilah program resurfaced on WLTW in New York City two months later and continues to be heard there).

In August 2026, WHUD shifted toward hot adult contemporary with a heavy emphasis on music released in the 1990s. The station subsequently changed its slogan to "The 90s to Now", and updated its logo. No changes have been made to its on-air schedule.

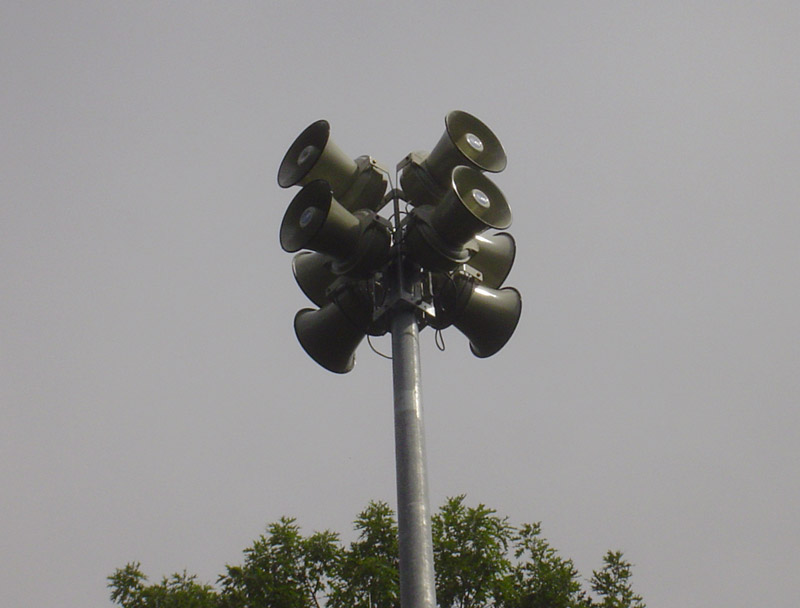
Indian Point warning Siren at WHUD transmitter site

WHUD serves as the primary (LP-1) Emergency Alert System (EAS) station for Westchester, Rockland, Putnam, and Orange Counties. As such it is the first media outlet in the Indian Point Nuclear Power Plant public warning system. Prior to the studio move to Fishkill, New York, these duties fell to WABC in New York City because WHUD's studio was located within the 10-mile (16 km) Emergency Planning Zone around the Indian Point Energy Center. In July 2007 Pamal spent approximately $500,000 to upgrade WHUD's transmitter site and add redundancies to its technical facility to ensure that the station could meet its public warning responsibilities.

WHUD's signal reaches most of the Hudson Valley and the suburbs of New York City with a usable signal in much of Manhattan, Queens and especially in the Bronx. In total, WHUD's signal reaches parts of five states. The primary target market of WHUD is Westchester and Rockland Counties plus the Mid-Hudson Valley. In all of these areas, WHUD is at or near the top of the ratings and is the highest rated Westchester County station in Nielsen's New York City book.

For many years, WHUD played Christmas music only occasionally in the month between Thanksgiving and Christmas, going with all holiday songs in the days leading to December 25. Most adult contemporary stations in the U.S. and Canada switch to all Christmas music for part of November and most of December. In 2020, during the COVID-19 pandemic, WHUD joined with other AC stations and played all Christmas songs from Thanksgiving to Christmas Day.
