= WCKL (New York) =

- Catskill, New York; United States
- Broadcast area: Mid-Hudson Region
- Frequency: 560 kHz

Ownership
- Owner: Family Broadcasting and Media, LLC

History
- First air date: 1970
- Last air date: 2015
- Call sign meaning: Catskill

Technical information
- Facility ID: 63526
- Class: D
- Power: 1,000 watts (day); 43 watts (night)
- Transmitter coordinates: 42°12′3.3″N 73°50′7.5″W

WCKL (560 AM) was a radio station licensed to Catskill, New York, United States, to broadcast at 560 kHz. The station lost its license in October 2016 in a consent decree with the Federal Communications Commission (FCC) in which Brian Dodge admitted lying to the FCC, using various false names and addresses to control radio stations, numerous other violations, and a $100,000 fine to be paid by selling three FM translators to other broadcasters. Earlier, the station had sold to Clear Channel Communications in a $4.3 million package deal which included WCKL, WCTW, WHUC and WTHK.

WCKL had been primarily dark under its final ownership, primarily due to non payment of transmitter site rent to iHeartMedia (the former Clear Channel). It had been silent since March 10, 2015, but were granted on March 9, 2016, special temporary authority to use a temporary site at 25% power from a long wire antenna. The station never used that facility according to the consent decree so as a matter of FCC law WCKL's license expired March 10, 2016, due to one year of continuous silence.
