= WDFB (AM) =

- Junction City, Kentucky; United States
- Broadcast area: Daytime Only
- Frequency: 1170 kHz

Programming
- Format: Religious

Ownership
- Owner: Alum Springs Vision & Outreach Corp

Technical information
- Licensing authority: FCC
- Facility ID: 1197
- Class: D
- Power: 1,000 watts day
- Transmitter coordinates: 37°35′46″N 84°50′19″W

Links
- Public license information: Public file; LMS

WDFB (1170 AM) is a radio station broadcasting a Religious format. Licensed to Junction City, Kentucky, United States, the station serves the Daytime Only area. The station is currently owned by Alum Springs Vision & Outreach Corp.
