= WBNR =

Beacon
New York
- Beacon, New York; United States
- Broadcast area: Hudson Valley
- Frequency: 1260 kHz
- Branding: The Beacon

Programming
- Format: Conservative talk
- Affiliations: Fox News Radio; Salem Radio Network; Westwood One; Army Black Knights football; New York Knicks; New York Rangers

Ownership
- Owner: Pamal Broadcasting; (6 Johnson Road Licenses, Inc.)
- Sister stations: WBPM; WGHQ; WHUD; WLNA; WSPK; WXPK

History
- First air date: December 17, 1959
- Call sign meaning: "Beacon Newburgh Radio"

Technical information
- Licensing authority: FCC
- Facility ID: 19629
- Class: B
- Power: 1,000 watts (day); 400 watts (night)
- Transmitter coordinates: 41°29′32.34″N 73°58′41.5″W
- Translator: 96.5 W243EM (Beacon)

Links
- Public license information: Public file; LMS
- Website: www.hvbeacon.com

WLNA (1260 AM) is a commercial radio station licensed to Beacon, New York, and serving the Hudson Valley. The station is owned by Pamal Broadcasting and calls itself "The Beacon." It simulcasts a conservative talk radio format with sister stations WLNA (1420 AM) in Peekskill and WGHQ (920 AM) in Kingston. The studios are located on New York State Route 52 in Beacon.

WBNR is powered at 1,000 watts by day and 400 watts at night. It has a directional antenna using a two-tower array at 475 South Avenue in the city of Beacon. Programming is also hear on 100-watt FM translator W243EM at 96.5 MHz.

== Programming ==
Weekdays on "The Beacon" (WBNR, WLNA and WGHQ) begin with a local news and interview show, Hudson Valley Focus with Tom Sipos. The rest of the day, nationally syndicated programs are heard: Brian Kilmeade, Dan Bongino, Charlie Kirk, Joe Pags, Bill O'Reilly, America at Night with Rick Valdés, Red Eye Radio and America in the Morning. Weekends feature specialty shows on travel, golf, cars and guns. Syndicated weekend hosts include Dave Ramsey, Larry Elder, Hugh Hewitt, Mike Gallagher, Rudy Maxa and Eric Metaxas.

The Beacon carries live sports including New York Rangers hockey, New York Knicks basketball and Army Black Knights football from nearby West Point.

== History ==
=== Early years ===
WBNR signed on the air on December 17, 1959. It was powered at 1,000 watts and was a daytimer station, required to go off the air at night. It was built, engineered, owned and operated by Robert Gessner and brothers Sy and Al Dresner. The original studio was near Denning's Point, a location on the Hudson River that has an archaeological record going back 5,000 years. Former staffers felt that this explained frequent reports of paranormal activity in the studio building.

It was not until 1987 that WBNR was licensed for 480 watts night time operation with a DA2 antenna pattern. For many years it was owned by brothers Robert and Alford Lessner, who were involved in the popular TV show Candid Camera. The station served the community with a full service, middle of the road (MOR) music format, local news and sports. It was heavily involved with Beacon community events and was the flagship station for Army Black Knights football.

=== Changes in ownership ===
In 1970, Lance Broadcasting, then owners of WBNR, acquired WSPK (104.7 FM) from Poughkeepsie–based Olympian Broadcasting. Olympian was also the owner of WKIP (1450 AM), along with the mountain top transmitter site on North Mount Beacon.

In the 1980s and 1990s, radio listeners increasingly tuned to FM stations for music. That hurt the ratings on WBNR. In 1994, WBNR and WSPK were sold to Enterprise Media of Binghamton, New York. Both stations were subsequently sold to Pamal Broadcasting in October 1997. The studios moved from their original 1959 location at 475 South Avenue in Beacon to the newly reconstructed "Broadcast Center" at 715 Fishkill Avenue (NY Route 52), in Fishkill, New York.

=== Classic country, classic hits and conservative talk ===
On Monday, March 24, 2014, WBNR and WLNA switched to "Real Country", a national music format. The stations began playing classic country hits of the 1960s, 1970s, 1980s and 1990s. On December 3, 2019, WBNR began simulcasting on translator station W243EM at 96.5 FM. That gave listeners in and around Beacon the option of tuning in WBNR on the FM dial.

On March 15, 2021, WBNR changed from classic country to a simulcast of co-owned classic hits station WBPM in Suagerties.

On October 14, 2024, WBNR ended its simulcast of WBPM. It switched to a conservative talk format, simulcast with WGHQ in Kingston and WLNA in Peekskill. The stations began airing talk hosts from Westwood One and were branded as "The Beacon". They became network affiliates of ABC News Radio.

== Translator ==
Broadcast translator for WBNR
Call sign	Frequency	City of license	FID	ERP (W)	Class	Transmitter coordinates	FCC info
W243EM	96.5 FM	Beacon, New York	202877	100	D	41°29′32″N 73°58′38″W	LMS
