= WWTR =

- Bridgewater, New Jersey; United States
- Broadcast area: Central New Jersey
- Frequency: 1170 kHz
- Branding: EBC Radio

Programming
- Format: South Asian

Ownership
- Owner: EBC Music, Inc.

History
- First air date: December 23, 1971; 54 years ago
- Former call signs: WBRW (1971–1990); WSPW (1997–1999); WWTR (1999–2006); WJJZ (2006)
- Call sign meaning: similar to WMTR (former simulcast)

Technical information
- Licensing authority: FCC
- Facility ID: 6684
- Class: D
- Power: 600 watts (daytime only)
- Transmitter coordinates: 40°33′37.0″N 74°35′22.0″W

Links
- Public license information: Public file; LMS
- Webcast: Listen live
- Website: ebcmusic.com

WWTR (1170 AM, "EBC Radio") is a radio station in Bridgewater, New Jersey broadcasting a South Asian-oriented ethnic format. The station is currently owned by EBC Music, Inc.

WWTR is powered by 600 watts daytime only. At night, WWTR must sign off the air to avoid interference with clear-channel station WWVA in Wheeling, West Virginia.

== History ==
The station signed on December 23, 1971, as WBRW, a middle of the road-formatted station owned by the Somerset Valley Broadcasting Corporation and licensed to Somerville, New Jersey. The station subsequently shifted to an adult contemporary format, and was later relicensed to Bridgewater. However, WBRW began to lose money during the 1980s, and in 1990 it was taken off-the-air.

The Bridgewater Broadcasting Corporation purchased the license in 1993, and brought WBRW back on the air in February 1997. Initially airing its own programming, in December 1997 the station became WSPW and began to simulcast One on One Sports programming from WJWR in Newark (now WSNR in Jersey City). The following year, the station was sold to New Jersey Broadcasters and in April 1999 became a simulcast of sister standards station WMTR, under the callsign WWTR. New Jersey Broadcasting was sold to Greater Media in 2001. WMTR and WWTR shifted to a classic oldies format, emphasizing pre-1964 music, in 2004.

WWTR was leased to EBC Music, Inc. on November 1, 2005, who moved their "EBC Radio" South Asian programming from WTTM. The station's call letters were then changed to WJJZ for a brief time in 2006 so that Greater Media could transfer that callsign to 97.5 FM in Burlington (now WPEN); after this was completed, 1170 returned to WWTR. In 2011 EBC Music ended their lease agreement and bought WWTR.
