= WRWB-FM =

Coordinates: 41.685°N 74.356°W

Simulcast of WRWD-FM, Highland
- Ellenville, New York; United States
- Broadcast area: Hudson Valley; eastern Catskills
- Frequency: 99.3 MHz
- Branding: Country 99.3 WRWD

Programming
- Format: Country
- Affiliations: Premiere Networks; Westwood One

Ownership
- Owner: iHeartMedia, Inc.; (iHM Licenses, LLC)
- Sister stations: WCTW; WHUC; WPKF; WRNQ; WRWD-FM; WZCR; WBWZ; WJIP; WKIP

History
- First air date: 1970 (as WELV-FM)
- Former call signs: WELV-FM (1970–1981); WDRE (1981–1984); WELV-FM (1984–1989); WWWK (1989–1995); WTHN (1995–2001); WFKP (2001–2006); WRWC (2006–2009); WKIP-FM (2009–2012)
- Call sign meaning: similar to WRWD

Technical information
- Licensing authority: FCC
- Facility ID: 63525
- Class: A
- ERP: 115 watts
- HAAT: 497 meters (1,631 ft)

Links
- Public license information: Public file; LMS
- Webcast: Listen live (via iHeartRadio)
- Website: wrwdcountry.iheart.com

WRWB-FM (99.3 MHz) is a radio station licensed to Ellenville, New York, and serving an area including much of the Hudson Valley and the eastern parts of the Catskills. WRWB-FM is owned by iHeartMedia, Inc. and broadcasts with 115 watts effective radiated power from a tower site on Shawangunk Ridge in Ellenville. The high elevation of this tower site gives the station a fringe coverage area that stretches from the Berkshire Mountains in Massachusetts to the Pocono Mountains in Pennsylvania. Its studios are in Arlington, New York.

== History ==
The 99.3 frequency first signed on in 1970 as WELV-FM, sister to AM daytimer WELV (today's WJIP) and the first FM station in Ulster County outside of Kingston. The FM signal allowed WELV to extend its middle of the road programming with the two stations simulcasting during daytime hours with the FM continuing after the AM's signoff. This arrangement would continue until 1981, when WELV-FM would separate from the AM and switch to a beautiful music/easy listening format with mostly instrumentals. The station would be known as WDRE and be automated.

In January 1985, Eric Straus (grandson of Nathan Straus, then owner of WMCA in New York City) purchased the stations as the first stations in what would eventually become a regional group. The formats of both WELV and WDRE were dropped. WDRE reverted to the WELV-FM call letters and began simulcasting its AM station, WELV again. The stations flipped to an adult standards format. Core artists included Frank Sinatra, Jack Jones, Neil Diamond, Kay Starr, Frankie Laine, Harry James, Carpenters, Nat King Cole, Tony Bennett, Glenn Miller, Bing Crosby, Perry Como, Barry Manilow, The 5th Dimension, and others. The stations would also play softer Elvis Presley and Beatles songs. At some points, the stations played a few adult contemporary songs mixed in. The station ran a syndicated format, Unforgettable from 1985 to 1986 and then a locally based format until 1989.

In mid-1989, WELV's long-standing format was broken with WELV-FM flipping to a music-intensive, mainly satellite-fed adult contemporary format as WWWK (K-Lite) with WELV simulcasting it much of the day. The "K-Lite" format would last until late 1994 when WWWK (and WELV) flipped to a satellite-fed hot adult contemporary format, a format that would serve as a placeholder while Straus waited for a purchase of two stations in Hudson to close.

In the spring of 1995, WWWK joined with WRVW in Hudson with the two stations simulcasting a satellite "hot country" format known as "Thunder Country" with WWWK changing its calls to WTHN in the process. With the move, the on-air operations for WTHN (and WELV) would move from Ellenville to Hudson, a move that would be short lived as both the Hudson and Ellenville stations would move to Poughkeepsie in 1997 when the format added WTND in that city.

Faced with competition from market dominant WRWD-FM, WVOS-FM in Monticello, and WGNA-FM in Albany, the Thunder Country format never was successful. After Straus Media sold its stations to Clear Channel Communications in 2000, a format change at WTHN became apparent. On December 22, these rumors became truth when WCTJ (the former WTND) and WTHN entered joint stunting as "Variety 96 & 99" and launched as rhythmic top 40 that afternoon using Clear Channel's KissFM brand. Shortly after the start of 2001, WTHN would change its calls to WFKP to match that of WCTJ's new WPKF calls.

Though the Kiss format was successful marketwide and on WPKF, WFKP suffered from unsteady ratings in the nearby Newburgh/Middletown market. After a period of declining ratings, WFKP left its simulcast with WPKF in March 2005 to flip to an adult contemporary format as "LiteFM", airing a delayed and localized version of the programming heard on sister WRNQ in Poughkeepsie. However, the experiment proved unwieldy and in the wake of Clear Channel announcing the sale of their Poughkeepsie-area stations the simulcast was terminated on November 20, 2006. Coincidentally, this briefly reunited the former WELV and WELV-FM in terms of programming.

On November 20, 2006, WFKP replaced the WRNQ "shadowcast" with two days of love songs as "Cupid 99.3". After that ended, WFKP began playing a "Country Holiday Favorites" format and announced that after Christmas the station would begin simulcasting with sister station WRWD-FM, also from Poughkeepsie. On November 28, new call letters of WRWC would follow.

On November 2, 2009, WRWC changed its call letters to WKIP-FM and changed its format to news/talk, swapping formats with sister station 1370 AM, WRWD.

On March 8, 2012, WKIP-FM returned to simulcasting WRWD-FM; the talk programming, a simulcast of WKIP from Poughkeepsie, returned to 1370 AM. The call letters were changed to WRWB-FM the next day (March 9).
