= WSPK =

Radio station in Poughkeepsie, New York

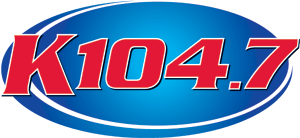
- Poughkeepsie, New York; United States
- Broadcast area: Mid-Hudson
- Frequency: 104.7 MHz
- Branding: K104.7

Programming
- Language: English
- Format: Contemporary hit radio

Ownership
- Owner: Pamal Broadcasting; (6 Johnson Road Licenses, Inc.)
- Sister stations: WBNR; WBPM; WGHQ; WHUD; WLNA; WXPK

History
- First air date: December 7, 1947
- Former call signs: WHVA (1947–1952); WRRH (1952–1953); WKIP-FM (1953–1970)
- Call sign meaning: "Stereo Poughkeepsie"

Technical information
- Licensing authority: FCC
- Facility ID: 19630
- Class: B
- ERP: 7,400 watts
- HAAT: 381 meters (1,250 feet)
- Transmitter coordinates: 41°29′19.3″N 73°56′50.4″W

Links
- Public license information: Public file; LMS
- Webcast: Listen live
- Website: www.k104online.com

WSPK (104.7 FM, "K104.7") is a contemporary hit radio station licensed to Poughkeepsie, New York. Its studios are located on Route 52 Business in the town of Fishkill (with a Beacon address). It is owned by Pamal Broadcasting and transmits from a tower atop Beacon Mountain in Fishkill.

== History ==
Poughkeepsie Newspaper Incorporated, then owner of WKIP, signed on WHVA 104.7 MHz on December 7, 1947. It was the first FM station to sign on between New York City and the Albany area. The transmitter site was located on North Mount Beacon in an area that was mainly a bungalow colony above the Mount Beacon Incline Railway and casino. The building and tower had been previously used by WOKO in the late 1920s. While that site did not work well for AM radio because of the poor ground conductivity, it proved an excellent site for FM radio due to its height advantages.

In its early years, the station played classical music and for a time was a part of a regional network operated by station WQXR. In 1950, WHVA was sold to the Rural Radio Network, which later was renamed the "Northeast Radio Network". The call sign was changed to WRRH. In June 1953, WRRH was sold to Dutchess Broadcasting Corporation, owners of WKIP. This would make the second time the station was co-owned with WKIP. The call letters were changed to WKIP-FM and the station adopted a full-time simulcast of WKIP's full service format.

In 1968 WKIP-FM added stereo capabilities and split off from its AM sister station with a Top 40 format.

In 1970 WKIP-FM was sold to Beacon Broadcasting, owner of WBNR, and took on new call letters: WSPK (Stereo Poughkeepsie). With new owners came a 60% simulcast with WBNR that created a varied middle of the road/classical/beautiful music format which was commonplace on many FM stations at the time. The new owners also chose an unusual identifier for an FM frequency: 10-47 (said on-air as "ten-forty-seven").

By 1972, the station changed to a country music format to counter the newly relaunched WPDH. Country did not last long on the frequency and in the fall of 1974, WSPK adopted a Top 40 format under the moniker "10-47, More Music!", which ran from the fall of 1974 to early 1977. During this period, WSPK simulcast the WBNR morning show hosted by Rick Liotta. The station also simulcast with WBNR on the weekends, breaking away for network newscasts on the half-hour and when WBNR ran Yankees baseball, WSPK played pre-recorded oldies tapes voiced by Liotta. The national radio show American Top 40 with Casey Kasem also debuted during this time; WKNY in Kingston would become the regional affiliate, however, through the 1980s as WPLJ took AT40 following its July 1983 switch to Top 40. At the time the 95.5 MHz reached much of the mid-Hudson Valley thanks to FM via cablevision.

In the spring of 1977, WSPK again went after WPDH which had flipped from country to automated album-oriented rock (AOR) a year earlier with instant ratings success. WSPK's AOR format concentrated on quieter tracks than PDH's approach and struggled as WPDH refined its rock format. In 1978, SPK went to an unusual CHR/oldies hybrid called "Gold N' Stereo" combining music by Sugarhill Gang, Neil Diamond, The Who, Abba, Free, Prince, and the Monkees. The station itself evolved to a more pure CHR "hit music" format from 1980 through 1981.

=== K104 history ===
In 1979, Stew Schantz (who also had worked stints at WPDH, later WSPK program director) re-worked the station's image, branding it "K-104". Schantz and the station's sales manager, Chuck Stewart, picked up the idea from a sales conference out west (there, station call signs usually begin with a "K" where east of the Mississippi River they usually begin with a "W"). The new name worked wonders for a station which had spent the previous decade adrift. Stew returned to mornings at WPDH, but he would later return again to K-104 in the late 1980s. Jim Simonetti was WSPK's first PD in its new incarnation as an Adult Top 40 calling itself K-104. He would later transfer to Beacon Broadcasting's WSCR in Scranton, Pennsylvania. Chris Leide would succeed him as PD until 1989, when afternoon host Sean Phillips would become PD until 1992. Mark Bolger, currently at WCZX (MIX 97FM), joined K104. As a later evening DJ, Bolger was nicknamed as "The Bolge" from 1985 to 1988. He then handled the K-104 morning drive as "Mark Bolger in the Morning on K104" until 1996. Mark Bolger's "Record Crusher" segment, a test play on new hit records, was a notable trademark of his evening show. Nick Robbins also rocked the Hudson valley in K104s early Rock of the Hudson Days, Stew Schantz re-joined K-104 in 1988 after leaving the "Stew and John Morning Show" at WPDH, initially handling the afternoon drive before eventually moving into the midday slot. The "All-Request Lunch at Noon with Stew Schantz" also debuted, with Scotty Mac as the current host as the "All-Request Lunch at Noon with Scotty Mac". Scotty joined the station in 1989 originally handling voiceover and commercial production work with weekend host (and later MD) Chris St. James. With the exception of one year being at KHITS Tulsa, OK in 1998, Scotty Mac is the longest tenured air personality at the station, and is currently midday host and PD.

By the early 1990s, K-104 evolved to a more adult-leaning approach as the CHR format went into a short-term decline. The decline was mainly due to country music's resurgence immediately following the Persian Gulf War. With this, the numbers weakened even though there was no real competition for its target audience. In 1996, owner Beacon Broadcasting sold their remaining stations to Enterprise Media of Binghamton. Under this new ownership, Mark Bolger left the station, and Stew Schantz handled the K-104 morning drive. Their ownership was short lived, as they in turn sold WBNR and WSPK to Pamal Broadcasting in 1998. Upon Pamal's take over, Schantz resigned from the station. He later went on to do behind-the-scenes work in Utica, Albany and Pittsfield, Massachusetts. Schantz died in June 2010. The sale to Pamal ended K-104's running of weekend shows such as Open House Party with John Garabedian, Classic Dance Tracks with Stevie T, as well as the K-104 Hometown Countdown.

After Schantz's departure, Brian Krysz took on the program director's responsibilities and hired Kent Bonham ("Woodman") to handle the K-104 morning drive. Krysz programmed the station until May 1999, when Scotty Mac (formerly nights in 1991) took over. The changes led to a re-imaged CHR approach which leaned towards dance music. The station's ratings improved, regaining top position in many key demographics, as well as the 12+ bragging rights. Though in recent years weak competition has come in the form of WPKF and the station is a perennial No. 1, K-104 is still a dominant force in the Hudson Valley radio markets. K-104 also has the distinction as being the oldest FM 24/7 top 40 station in continuous operation in the United States, as this station pioneered such format on the FM radio dial. Other radio stations in the country including WPLJ, WHTZ (Z-100), KISS 108 (WXKS-FM) Boston and KIIS-FM Los Angeles, would later evolve and emulate into similar 24/7 radio formats. The late Stew Schantz is considered a pioneer in establishing this type of radio format, as he is listed as one of the notable program directors and disk jockeys in the Rock and Roll Hall of Fame (alongside Alan Freed, Dick Clark, Casey Kasem and many others, local and national). Jarrett "Skywalker" Galeno joined K-104 in 2000, from WBLI. Holding down assistant program director responsibilities, he also hosts afternoon drive.

Kent "Woodman" Bonham originally hosted the K-104 morning show from 1998 to 2006. Upon his exit, Chris Marino took the helm from 2006 until 2009 when Kent "Woodman" Bonham returned. Woodman has continued to host mornings ever since. The current morning line-up features co-host Jill, long-time morning news voice and K-104 personality, Bill Beale, and a diverse cast of characters.

K-104 is known for its use of voice-over veteran Mark Driscoll as the station's voice from 1994 to the end of 1997 and from 1999 through today. Before Driscoll, Mitch Craig was the voice guy.

K-104 is the Top 40 radio station in the United States whose terrestrial radio is broadcast over more states than any other Top 40 station in the country and currently can be heard in New York, New Jersey, Connecticut, Massachusetts, Pennsylvania, and Vermont.

=== K107 ===
In early 2003, Pamal Broadcasting purchased WYNY (107.1 MHz), the Westchester County portion of the former New Country Y-107 "quadcast" (by then running contemporary Spanish music as "Rumba 107") from Nassau Broadcasting (which itself had bought all four stations from Big City Radio). On April 9 of that year, WYNY took on the WXPK calls and the stations relaunched as "K-104 and K-107". Due to various problems keeping the station on the air and generating revenue with the Westchester signal, the simulcast ended one year later when the 107.1 frequency changed to adult album alternative as "107.1 The Peak".

== KFEST ==
WSPK holds a yearly event known as K*Fest. In 2007, rapper Akon threw a boy off the stage into the crowd, an event which attracted media attention. As of November 29, 2007, charges have been filed against Akon regarding this incident. Charges include, Endangering the Welfare of a Minor, a misdemeanor and second-degree harassment.
