= WWLE =

- Cornwall, New York; United States
- Broadcast area: Poughkeepsie–Newburgh–Middletown metropolitan area
- Frequency: 1170 kHz
- Branding: El Poder

Programming
- Language: Spanish
- Format: Regional Mexican

Ownership
- Owner: WWLE Radio LLC

History
- First air date: November 22, 1969
- Former call signs: WWLE (1969–1981); WCRR (1981–1990); WNBW (1990); WARW (1990–1993); WRWD (1993–1996)

Technical information
- Licensing authority: FCC
- Facility ID: 72622
- Class: D
- Power: 800 watts day
- Transmitter coordinates: 41°26′24.3″N 74°4′23.5″W
- Translator: (100.1 MHz) W261DY (Newburgh)

Links
- Public license information: Public file; LMS

WWLE (1170 AM) is a radio station broadcasting a Regional Mexican format. Licensed to Cornwall, New York, United States, the station serves the Newburgh-Middletown area. The station is owned by WWLE Radio LLC.

AM 1170 is a United States clear-channel frequency, on which WWVA and KOTV share Class A status. WWLE must leave the air during the sunset to sunrise period to protect the nighttime skywave signals of the Class A stations.

== History ==
WWLE has existed in two incarnations. The original WWLE came to air on November 22, 1969, as the dream of the late ABC radio newscaster William L. Edmonds; the call letters are his initials. Edmonds' widow Adeline served as WWLE's president, while their son Bill ran the news department. The station aired a big band/standards format with country music programs on the weekends, broadcasting from the village of Cornwall-on-Hudson. After several years, the station faced financial troubles and was eventually bought out by investors including Angelo Martinelli, the mayor of Yonkers, New York. By 1981, WWLE had been replaced with a new station, WCRR, which eventually went dark for several years.

The old WWLE returned as WNBW on February 19, 1990, changing later in the year to WARW, becoming WRWD (simulcasting WRWD-FM) in 1993, then finally bringing back the old WWLE call letters in 1996. By the late 1990s, the station had moved out of the village of Cornwall to a facility on New York State Route 299 near New Paltz, New York, airing an automated big band format. Later, the station was bought by 1170 Broadcast Radio, Inc. and flipped to a news/talk format, featuring programming from CNN Radio. In 2010, WWLE filed a petition to move to 1150 AM and increase its power (not possible on 1170 because of interference by WWVA in Wheeling, West Virginia); no action has been taken by the Federal Communications Commission (FCC).

In 2014, WWLE changed again, this time to a Regional Mexican format under the name El Poder ("The Power")

Effective March 18, 2019, 1170 Broadcast Radio sold the station to WWLE Radio LLC.
