= List of programming syndicated by iHeartMedia =

The majority of programming syndicated by iHeartMedia is distributed through its subsidiary, Premiere Networks, owned by the company since 1999 and purchased by antecedent Jacor in 1997. However, several music and talk shows originated on iHeartMedia-owned stations are syndicated by those stations without the assistance of Premiere, or via a third-party distributor. Talk shows of this type are generally broadcast through Orbital Media Networks, Inc., formerly Clear Channel Satellite Services. Music programs of this type, including music scheduling and voice-tracking, are distributed through an intranet service known as "Premium Choice".

== Talk shows ==
=== Currently in production ===
Radio programs syndicated by iHeartMedia but not distributed by Premiere Networks include:

- Armstrong & Getty
- Ellen K Weekend Show
- Elliot in the Morning with Elliot Segal
- Mojo in the Morning
- Murphy, Sam & Jodi
- Rover's Morning Glory
- The Travel Show with Don Shafer and Larry Gelwix
- Valentine in the Morning with Sean Valentine

=== Former programs ===
Radio programs formerly syndicated by iHeartMedia include:

- America's Trucking Network
- Kidd Kraddick in the Morning
- Lex and Terry
- MJ Morning Show and The Schnitt Show
- Springer on the Radio
- The John and Ken Show
- The Paul and Young Ron Show
- The War Room with Quinn and Rose

=== Formerly internally distributed, since assumed by Premiere ===
Radio programs syndicated by iHeartMedia that have moved to Premiere include:

- Elvis Duran and the Morning Show
- The Bobby Bones Show

== Custom ==
On April 15, 2009, Clear Channel Radio announced the start of "Premium Choice", an internal network of voice-tracking and music scheduling by specific format genres available to all 850 Clear Channel-owned radio stations, their HD Radio digital subchannels and the iHeartRadio platform. This followed a series of broad downsizing efforts throughout the station group in an attempt to restructure debt incurred from a $27 billion (equivalent to $40.4 billion in 2025) leveraged buyout; 1,850 off- and on-air employees were laid off throughout January 2009. A brand management team consisting of 24 programmers throughout the chain was organized in 2011 to oversee this initiative and blogs authored by on-air talent were cross-posted to station websites via Clear Channel's content management system.

Despite the "Premium Choice" name being used extensively in industry trades, the music formats and programming are not publicly marketed or promoted under this name. A company-wide e-mail sent on May 1, 2009, stated the following: "The Premium Choice program is not something we are talking openly about in the industry or in the public or in the press ... No CC employee should be discussing PC with the media or with record reps."

Jerry Del Colliano, author of the blog Inside Music Media and founder of the trade publication Inside Radio, has said that Clear Channel plans to replace local on-air talent with national Premium Choice content, with "nothing local, little live and everything cheap." In March 2014, the market research firm Edison Research stated that Clear Channel (renamed iHeartMedia later in the year) has "long pursued a strategy of eliminating local talent in its smaller markets via voice tracking and their Orwellian-named 'Premium Choice' networks." Premium Choice was renamed “Custom” in the late 2010s and has since expanded to include more formats.
