= Arlington, New York =

- Census-designated place
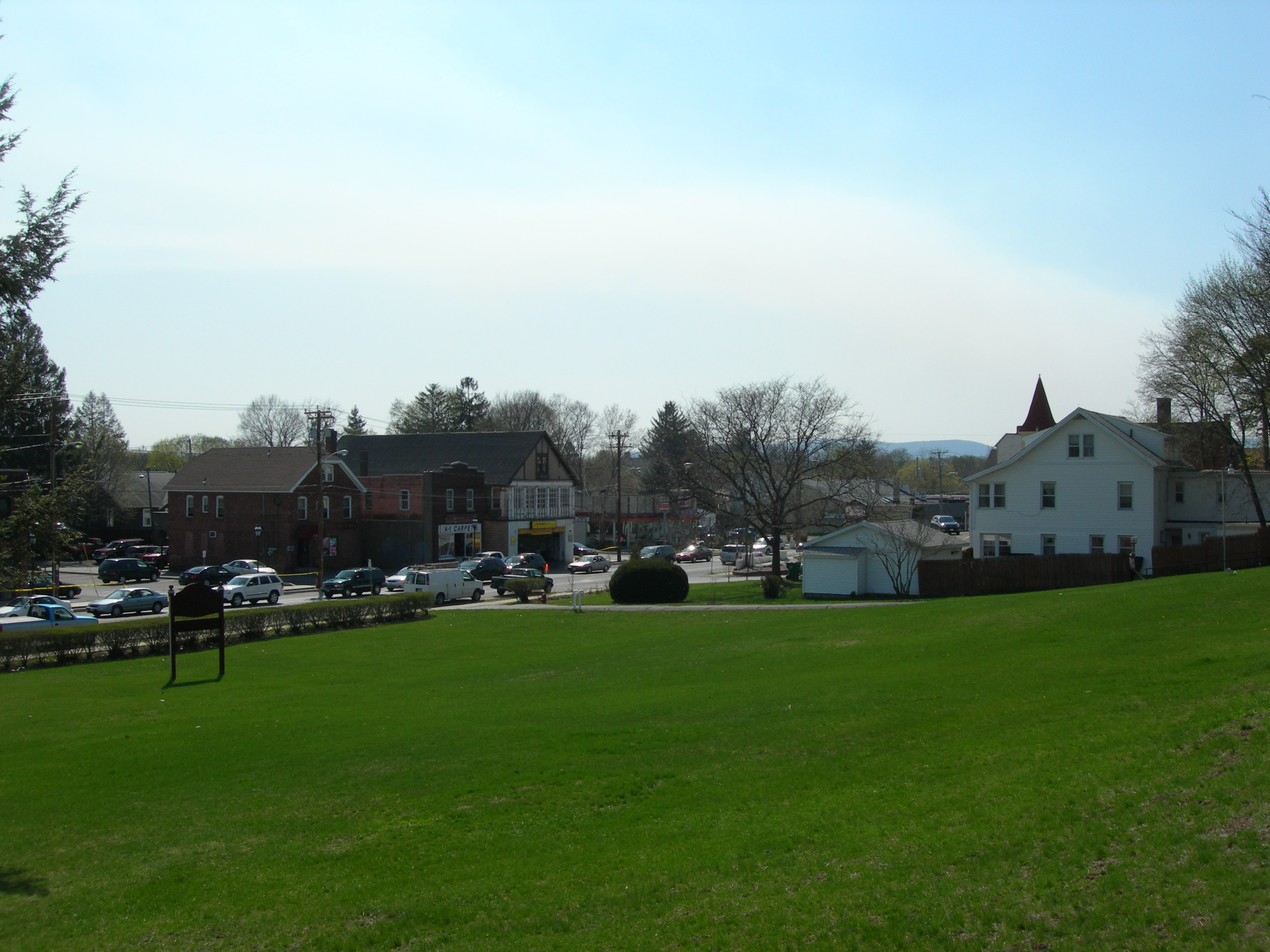
- Main Street, seen from top of hill at Church of the Holy Trinity

- Location of Arlington, New York
- Coordinates: 41°41′42″N 73°53′31″W
- Country: United States
- State: New York
- County: Dutchess
- Town: Poughkeepsie

Area
  - Total: 0.61 sq mi (1.58 km^{2})
  - Land: 0.61 sq mi (1.58 km^{2})
  - Water: 0 sq mi (0.00 km^{2})
- Elevation: 187 ft (57 m)

Population (2020)
  - Total: 3,010
  - Density: 4,946.0/sq mi (1,909.66/km^{2})
- Time zone: UTC-5 (Eastern (EST))
  - Summer (DST): UTC-4 (EDT)
- ZIP Codes: 12603 (Arlington); 12601 (Poughkeepsie)
- Area code: 845
- FIPS code: 36-02616
- GNIS feature ID: 0942561

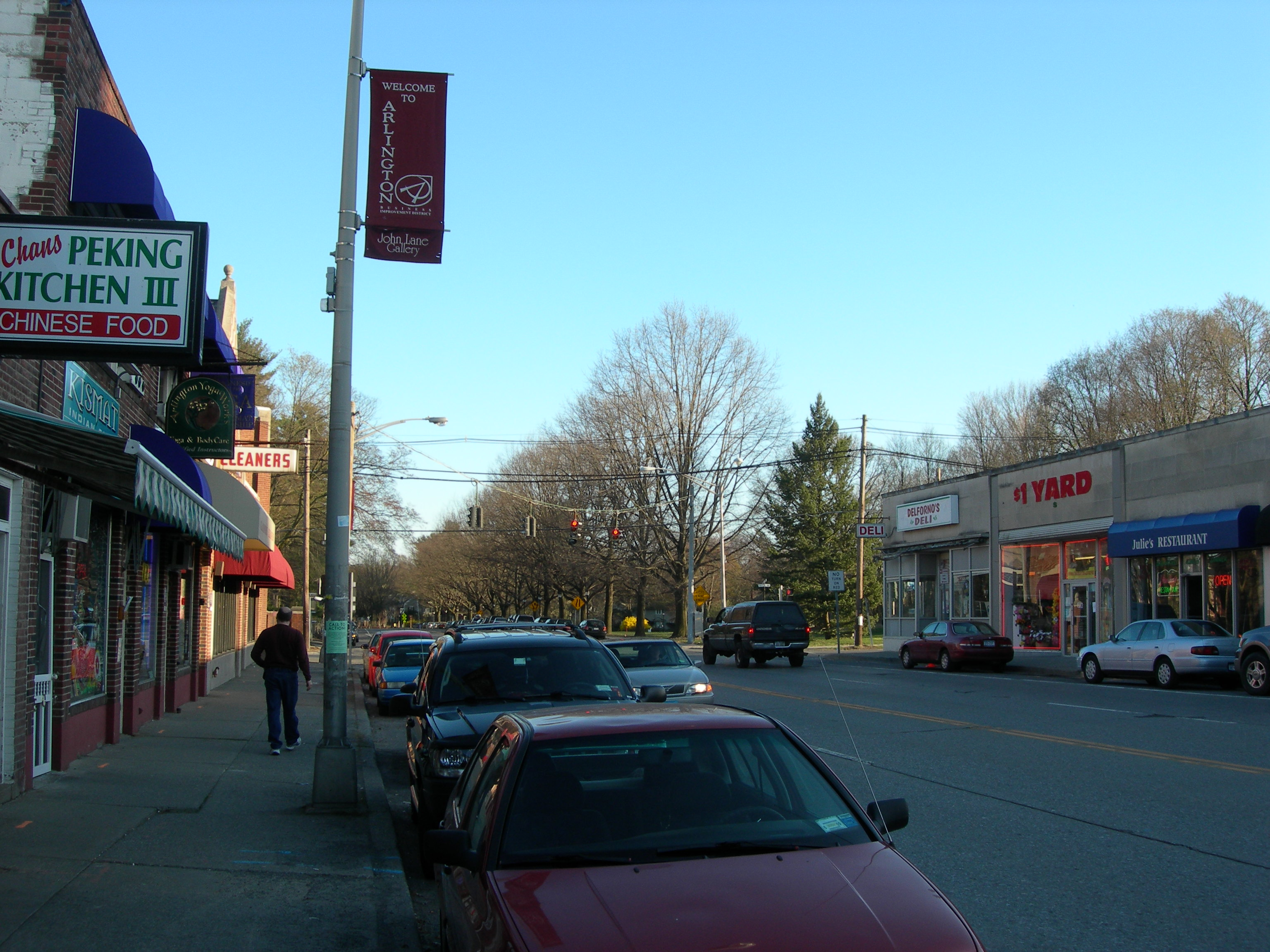
Raymond Avenue in Arlington

Arlington is a neighborhood and census-designated place (CDP) in the town of Poughkeepsie, Dutchess County, New York, and United States. As of the 2020 census, Arlington had a population of 3,010.

Arlington is a suburb of the neighboring city of Poughkeepsie. It is part of the Kiryas Joel–Poughkeepsie–Newburgh, NY Metropolitan Statistical Area as well as the larger New York–Newark–Bridgeport, NY-NJ-CT-PA Combined Statistical Area.

== Geography ==
Arlington is located at 41°41′42″N 73°53′31″W (41.694943, -73.892054), in the north-central part of the town of Poughkeepsie. It is bordered to the west by the city of Poughkeepsie.

According to the United States Census Bureau, the CDP has a total area of 0.66 square miles (1.7 km^{2}), all land.

== Demographics ==
Historical population
Census	Pop.	Note	%±
2010	4,061		—
2020	3,010		−25.9%
U.S. Decennial Census

=== 2020 census ===
As of the 2020 census, Arlington had a population of 3,010. The median age was 37.0 years. 23.8% of residents were under the age of 18 and 12.8% of residents were 65 years of age or older. For every 100 females there were 88.8 males, and for every 100 females age 18 and over there were 89.3 males age 18 and over.

100.0% of residents lived in urban areas, while 0.0% lived in rural areas.

There were 1,258 households in Arlington, of which 29.7% had children under the age of 18 living in them. Of all households, 32.4% were married-couple households, 22.9% were households with a male householder and no spouse or partner present, and 37.5% were households with a female householder and no spouse or partner present. About 37.1% of all households were made up of individuals and 11.8% had someone living alone who was 65 years of age or older.

There were 1,372 housing units, of which 8.3% were vacant. The homeowner vacancy rate was 4.5% and the rental vacancy rate was 4.8%.

Racial composition as of the 2020 census
Race	Number	Percent
White	1,377	45.7%
Black or African American	751	25.0%
American Indian and Alaska Native	23	0.8%
Asian	143	4.8%
Native Hawaiian and Other Pacific Islander	0	0.0%
Some other race	404	13.4%
Two or more races	312	10.4%
Hispanic or Latino (of any race)	699	23.2%

=== 2010 census ===
At the 2010 census, there were 4,061 people, 1,222 households and 721 families residing in the CDP. The population density was 6,061.2 inhabitants per square mile (2,340.2/km^{2}). There were 1,339 housing units at an average density of 1,998.5 per square mile (771.6/km^{2}). The racial makeup of the CDP was 63.4% White, 16.4% African American, 0.9% Native American, 8.1% Asian, 5.4% some other race, and 5.9% from two or more races. Hispanic or Latino of any race were 14.1% of the population.

There were 1,222 households, of which 33.5% had children under the age of 18 living with them, 37.3% were headed by married couples living together, 16.0% had a female householder with no husband present, and 41.0% were non-families. 34.6% of all households were made up of individuals, and 10.3% were someone living alone who was 65 years of age or older. The average household size was 2.43, and the average family size was 3.19.

18.6% of the population were under the age of 18, 34.2% from 18 to 24, 21.0% from 25 to 44, 18.5% from 45 to 64, and 7.9% who were 65 years of age or older. The median age was 22.9 years. For every 100 females, there were 83.3 males. For every 100 females age 18 and over, there were 80.6 males.

=== Income and poverty ===
For the period 2009 through 2013, the estimated median household income was $41,679, and the median family income was $56,250. Male full-time workers had a median income of $41,617 and females $35,459. The per capita income was $21,123. About 11.6% of families and 19.1% of the population were below the poverty line, including 21.5% of those under age 18 and 22.7% of those age 65 or over.

All of Vassar College is located within the zip code 12604, which falls inside the Arlington CDP.

== Sports ==
- Arlington Speedway (aka Airport Speedway) was a 1/4-mile (0.40 km) dirt oval facility opened in 1951. The facility featured stock car racing sanctioned by the Mutual Racing Association, which also hosted events at the Rhinebeck Speedway to meet the rising popularity of auto racing in Dutchess County following World War II. Racing ended after the 1962 season, and the land was repurposed for a radio station. (Note: Geolocation of Arlington Speedway: 41.7048°N 73.8879°W)

== See also ==
- Arlington Fire District
