= WHUC =

Simulcast of WRWD-FM, Highland
- Hudson, New York; United States
- Broadcast area: Capital District
- Frequency: 1230 kHz
- Branding: Country 106.9 WRWD

Programming
- Format: Country music
- Affiliations: Premiere Networks; Westwood One

Ownership
- Owner: iHeartMedia; (iHM Licenses, LLC)
- Sister stations: WCTW; WZCR

History
- First air date: October 21, 1947
- Former call signs: WAIP (2012)
- Call sign meaning: Hudson–Catskill

Technical information
- Licensing authority: FCC
- Facility ID: 63531
- Class: C
- Power: 1,000 watts
- Transmitter coordinates: 42°15′13.3″N 73°45′43.4″W
- Translator: 106.9 W295BN (Catskill)

Links
- Public license information: Public file; LMS
- Webcast: Listen live (via iHeartRadio)
- Website: wrwdcountry.iheart.com

WHUC (1230 AM) is a radio station simulcasting the country music format of WRWD-FM 107.3. Licensed to Hudson, New York, the station is owned by iHeartMedia (as iHM Licenses, LLC). WHUC's studios are in Arlington, New York, and its transmitter is in Lorenz Park, New York.

WHUC is powered at 1,000 watts non-directional. In August 2013, programming began being simulcast on FM translator W296AT at 106.9 MHz.

== History ==
Logo as an adult standards station

WHUC began broadcasting October 21, 1947, with 250 watts of power. It was owned by Colgren Broadcasting Company.

It previously featured adult standards programming from the America's Best Music network from Dial Global, as well as news from NBC News Radio. As of January 2013, the station began simulcasting WRWD-FM 107.3 in Poughkeepsie, New York.
