= WVOA =

WVOA may refer to:

- WVOA (AM), a radio station (1540 KHz) licensed to East Syracuse, New York, United States.
- WQSE-LD, a low-power television station (channel 6) licensed to Westvale, New York, United States, that used the call sign WVOA-LP from 2013 to 2021, and WVOA-LD from 2022 to 2025.
- WSEN (FM), a radio station (103.9 MHz) licensed to Mexico, New York, United States, which held the call signs WVOA and WVOA-FM from 2001 to 2009 and from 2009 to 2013
- WCIS-FM, a radio station (105.1 MHz) licensed to DeRuyter, New York, United States, which held the call sign WVOA from 1989 to 2001 and the call sign WVOA-FM from May to September 2009
