= WSEN (disambiguation) =

WSEN may refer to:

- WSEN, a radio station (103.9 FM) licensed to Mexico, New York
- WBVG, a defunct radio station (1050 AM) licensed to Baldwinsville, New York, which held the call sign WSEN from 1959 to 1993 and from 2003 to 2017
- WOLF-FM, a radio station (92.1 FM) licensed to Baldwinsville, New York, which held the call sign WSEN-FM from 1967 to 2016
- WYTS, a radio station (1230 AM) licensed to Columbus, Ohio, which held the call sign WSEN from 1930 to 1934
