= WNDR =

WNDR may refer to:

- WNDR-LD, a low-power television station (channel 32) licensed to serve Auburn, New York, United States; see List of television stations in New York (state)
- WNDR-LP, a low-power television station (channel 6) licensed to serve Auburn, New York
- WMBO (AM), a radio station (1340 AM) licensed to serve Auburn, New York, which held the call sign WNDR from 2016 to 2017
- WSEN (FM), a radio station (103.9 FM) licensed to serve Mexico, New York, which held the call sign WNDR-FM from 2013 to 2016
- WSKO (AM), a radio station (1260 AM) licensed to serve Syracuse, New York, which held the call sign WNDR from 1946 to 1996
- WNNY-LP, a defunct low-power television station (channel 13) formerly licensed to serve Syracuse, New York, which held the call sign WNDR-LP from 2015 to 2016
- WBLZ-LD, a low-power television station (channel 22, virtual 49) licensed to serve Syracuse, New York, which held the call sign WNDR-LP from 1998 to 2015
- World News Daily Report (WNDR), a fake news website.
