= Radio Disney =

American youth-focused radio network (1996–2021)

- Type: Radio network
- Country: United States
- Headquarters: Burbank, California, U.S.

Programming
- Language: English

Ownership
- Owner: Disney Branded Television

History
- Launch date: November 18, 1996; 29 years ago
- Closed: April 14, 2021; 5 years ago

Coverage
- Availability: National, through broadcast stations, satellite radio, and internet radio
- Affiliates: See list

Links
- Website: radio.disney.com at the Wayback Machine (archived December 29, 2020)

Radio Disney was an American radio network operated by the Disney Radio Networks unit of Disney Branded Television within Disney General Entertainment Content, headquartered in Burbank, California.

The network broadcast music programming oriented towards children, pre-teens and teenagers, focusing mainly on current hit music and a heavy emphasis on teen idols (particularly those signed with Disney Music Group record labels, such as Hollywood and Walt Disney); compared to most CHR stations, Radio Disney was far more aggressive in playing only current hits and eschewed recurrent rotation.

For many years Radio Disney affiliated with stations in markets of varying size, mainly large and mid-sized markets; however, by the early 2010s, Disney had begun to phase out the network's affiliations with terrestrial radio stations, and sold its owned-and-operated Radio Disney stations (with the exception of KDIS in Los Angeles) to third-parties, in order to focus more on its programming, marketing, creating revenue producing events and distribution of Radio Disney as an internet radio outlet on digital platforms.

In 2015, Radio Disney partnered with iBiquity to distribute the network terrestrially via its HD Radio platform, and with iHeartRadio for further digital distribution. In the same year, Radio Disney launched a spin-off service, Radio Disney Country, which carried a country music format catered towards a similar audience; in 2017, this service replaced the main Radio Disney service on KDIS, which was renamed KRDC. The network also lent its name to the Radio Disney Music Awards, an annual music awards presentation broadcast on television from 2014 to 2019 by Disney Channel.

On December 3, 2020, Disney announced that Radio Disney and Radio Disney Country would be shut down in the first quarter of 2021. On April 14, 2021, Radio Disney ceased broadcast when its last remaining terrestrial station, KRDC in Los Angeles, was quietly changed to a simulcast of KSPN 710 AM, an ESPN Radio frequency. Two years later, KRDC was sold to the owners of Christian Talk station KWVE-FM, and today, now operates as KWVE.

== Background ==
Disney had for a long time been involved in the music business, building off its success in movies and TV shows, which later became Disney Music Group. However, with radio, Disney was not committed to the medium only doing a few shows. Radio Disney is Disney's third foray into radio. In late 1955, Walt Disney started The Magic Kingdom radio show—running Monday through Fridays and which was heard on ABC Radio. Even before the 1996 Disney-CC/ABC merger, Disney and ABC Radio considered as early as 1991 planned for a children's radio network but dropped the idea. Starting on July 31, 1994, Disney started a weekend radio show, Live From Walt Disney World, that originated from both Disney World and Disneyland on Radio AAHS.

In November 1995, ABC Radio Networks and Children's Broadcast Corp. reached an agreement for ABC Radio to provide marketing and sales to Radio AAHS. After Disney's acquisition of CC/ABC, Disney had ABC Radio cancel the agreement in August 1996 plus announced the start of its own children's network and ended AAHS's Disney World broadcasting rights.

== History ==
=== ABC Radio Networks (1996–2006) ===
Radio Disney was test launched at 5 am on November 18, 1996, in four markets, Minneapolis, Atlanta, Salt Lake City, and Birmingham, Alabama by ABC Radio Networks. On March 8, 1997, a fifth test market was added, Seattle on former KidStar station KKDZ.

Pleased with the results in those four test markets, ABC Radio Networks announced on May 8 that Radio Disney would begin a nationwide rollout, starting on October 1. On August 26, Radio Disney was launched in Los Angeles on KTZN/710, and by the end of the year, the network had 14 affiliates.

By August 1998, 28 stations had affiliated with Radio Disney, with an expected 63 stations by the end of 1999. Radio Disney purchased KAAM (AM) (Plano, Texas) for $12 million and switched the station to the network in August. In 1998, the network was based out of its Dallas station.

Radio Disney Family Pledge

Because my family matters, I promise to spend at least one hour each week with my family participating in fun things that draw us together and celebrate what makes us unique.

— Radio World

Other than music, the network aired other programs such as "Mickey & Minnie's Tune Time", a two-hour, weekday-morning, toddler-aimed program, and two 60-second features per hour which included contests, "ABC News for Kids" and "Gross Me Out". The network ran its Radio Disney Project Family Initiative from July 1 to September 15, 2003, with family-themed programming and events to get family to sign on to the Radio Disney Family Pledge.

Former Radio Disney logo, used from 2002 to 2007.

Radio Disney would later begin being carried on XM Satellite Radio in 2001, with the station launching on Sirius Satellite Radio in 2002. Disney entered a joint venture to launch Capital Disney digital radio channel in the UK and operated from 2002 until June 29, 2007. In 2004, Disney paid the former Children's Broadcasting Corporation (which operated children's radio network Radio AAHS) $12.4 million in a lawsuit settlement.

In April 2002, Radio Disney began using a new logo, which was followed by the network redesigning its website, and changing its slogan to "Your Music, Your Way" on May 28, 2002.

On July 30, 2003, ABC Radio Networks founded the Radio Disney Group, who took over operations of most of Radio Disney's stations.

The year 2006 marked the network's 10th anniversary; Radio Disney rebroadcast its first hour of programming from November 18, 1996, on June 6, 2006, at around 4:58 pm. EST on stations in selected markets, such as WQEW. Also, as part of the 10th anniversary, Radio Disney held the "Totally 10 Birthday Concert" on July 22, 2006, at the Arrowhead Pond in Anaheim, California. It also included a simultaneous live webcast on the Radio Disney website. A second concert was held in Dallas, Texas, on November 18, 2006, at the Dallas Convention Center.

=== Disney Channels Worldwide (2006–2014) ===
In August 2006, operational duties of Radio Disney were transferred to the company's Disney–ABC Cable Networks Group (currently d.b.a. Disney Channels Worldwide), which otherwise operates Disney's cable television properties, except for ESPN.

On June 12, 2007, Disney spun off and merged its ABC Radio Networks with Citadel Broadcasting into Citadel Communications while retaining its ESPN Radio and Radio Disney networks and stations.

Former Radio Disney logo, used from 2007 to 2009.

In March 2008, Radio Disney and Gracenote signed a licensing agreement starting immediately that allowed the lyrics to be seen along with the song online on Radio Disney Internet Radio Player. The channel began streaming live on iTunes Radio Tuner in August 2008. In November 2008, Radio Disney relocated its main operations from Dallas to Los Angeles. The former radio studio that housed Radio Disney in Dallas began to be used by The Kidd Kraddick Morning Show in 2008.

On October 8, 2008, the network launched the Next Big Thing feature which allowed listeners to vote on young unsigned artists' songs to be played. In 2013, the Radio Disney Music Awards began airing on the Disney Channel.

Sometime in April 2009, Radio Disney changed its logo to the one used until the station's closure.

By 2009, Radio Disney was starting to reduce its station footprint to the larger markets to make the network more profitable. In January 2010, Radio Disney Group requested permission from the FCC to "silence" five of its owned-and-operated stations (along with a sixth station operating under a local marketing agreement with another company) while the stations were being sold. Disney sold six AM stations and one FM station that year. In June 2013, Disney announced the sale of seven owned-and-operated stations in medium-sized markets, in order to focus back on Radio Disney's broadcast distribution on the top-25 radio markets.

On April 10, 2014, it was announced that Radio Disney's Top 30 Countdown would become a syndicated radio show, distributed by Rick Dees's Dees Entertainment. Aha Radio, Slacker and ShowMobile signed online carriage agreements with the network in mid-2014.

=== Shift to HD Radio and digital (2014–2020) ===
On August 13, 2014, Radio Disney's general manager Phil Guerini announced plans to sell all but one of its remaining owned-and-operated stations on or before September 26, 2014, in order to focus more on the network's programming, co-branded events, and digital outlets. Listenership reports indicated that the majority of Radio Disney's audience listened to the network via satellite radio and other digital platforms, and only 18% via terrestrial AM/FM radio. KDIS remained operational to serve as the originating station for the Radio Disney network, while the remaining stations would continue carrying Radio Disney programming until their respective sales were completed. The last five Radio Disney owned-and-operated stations for sale were sold on September 15, 2015, to Salem Media Group (who was the largest purchaser of the stations) for $2.225 million.

On April 13, 2015, Disney announced that the Radio Disney network would move to HD Radio subchannels; the network would be distributed by iBiquity via deals with broadcast companies (CBS Radio, Entercom, Cumulus Media, etc.) with ad sales handled by its HD Radio Digital Network. A network representative stated that the move was intended to target families as in-car listeners. Eventually, those deals ended quietly after a few years. On August 6, 2015, Radio Disney was made available for listening on iHeartRadio.

It was announced that on November 25, 2019, Disney had secured a deal with Entercom to bring Radio Disney and Radio Disney Country to the company's Radio.com platform.

=== Decline and closure (2020–2021) ===
On December 3, 2020, Disney announced that both Radio Disney and Radio Disney Country would shut down in the first quarter of 2021 as part of its restructuring plan to focus more on producing content for the television networks and Disney+, with KRDC being put up for sale. Radio Disney began to wind down operations on New Year's Eve 2020, as their DJ's hosted their last shows, and was discontinued on SiriusXM on that same date. Radio Disney Country was completely shut down at noon Pacific Time on the same day as the main Radio Disney feed; KRDC subsequently returned to the main feed. On January 1, the station ceased its Top 40 format and switched to an automated flashback playlist which mainly consisted of songs from throughout the nearly 25-year history of the network. The Radio Disney app and website shut down on January 22, 2021, while the station continued to broadcast on iHeartRadio until it was removed sometime during March. At that point, the station was only heard in the Greater Los Angeles Area on terrestrial radio until April 14, 2021, at 10 am PT, when it was quietly discontinued and switched to a simulcast of sister station KSPN. The final song where Radio Disney played prior to being switched was "Unwritten" by Natasha Bedingfield.

Despite the station now being defunct, Radio Disney's Instagram and Twitter (now X) remain active to promote other Disney movies and TV shows, mainly those airing on Disney+.

=== Replacement services (2021–present) ===
On March 25, 2021, Disney launched Disney Hits, at the time exclusively on SiriusXM. Unlike Radio Disney, Disney Hits only includes music from The Walt Disney Company's productions.

In August 2022, Disney announced a partnership with Audacy Inc. to launch nine additional Disney-branded audio feeds through the Audacy mobile app, in addition to making Disney Hits available on that platform. The nine channels include jazz, a sing-along channel, flashback-format channels devoted to the 1990s, 2000s and 2010s, a "Disney Reimagined" channel, a Spanish-language channel, a channel devoted to music from Disney Channel, and an LGBTQ-oriented "Disney Pride" channel. The announcement noted that additional Disney-branded channels, including at least one Christmas music channel, would be added later in 2022.

== Programming ==
Radio Disney played a large selection of songs from stars and programs on Disney Channel, along with popular songs from mainstream pop and R&B artists that are found on conventional radio stations. The network aired edited versions of some Top 40 songs (which remove profanity and any other suggestive content, and in most cases, it replaces it with re-recorded lyrics specifically for the station) to make them appropriate for young listeners.

=== List of former programs broadcast by Radio Disney ===
- The Wakey Blakey Show – hosted by Blake Kuhre from 2007 to 2013, was the longest-running and most successful morning show in Radio Disney history. The show aired at the peak of Disney Channels Worldwide franchises. Blake also served as Executive Producer of the show that provided the largest daily block of weekday programming on the network, from 6 AM until 12 PM EST.
- Fearless Everyday – hosted by blogger and entrepreneur Alexa Curtis, is Radio Disney's first show to introduce topics such as social media and mental health to listeners.
- #ICYMI – In Case You Missed It
- 1 Hour of Nonstop Music – A One Hour Program that plays commercial free music.
- More Music Monday – Non-stop commercial-free music on Mondays without any hosts.
- Morning Update
- Radio Disney Country Spotlight
- Radio Disney Insider Show
- Really Good Time – Hosted by DJ Lela B, the program features dance music including remixes of popular songs. In addition, Lela B also hosts the Weekend Warm-Up show which similar features remixes of songs.
- The Radio Disney Top 3 – The Radio Disney Top 3, hosted by Morgan Tompkins, features the three most requested songs of the day, and after, a caller who is able to name all three songs will win a prize or super entry.
- TBT Top 3
- Radio Disney's Top 10 (originally Top 30 Countdown and Radio Disney's Top 30) – The longest-running program, originally hosted only by Susan Huber, soon by Jake Whetter, later by Ernie D., and eventually by various guest hosts. Songs that receive the most requests during the week are included on the countdown, played in descending order. In 2016, the Radio Disney Top 30, after being the longest-running program in the station, was shortened to only 10 songs. Around New Year's Eve or January 1st, a special version of the countdown featuring the 50 most requested songs of the year is broadcast. As of February 2018, it is hosted by various artists or other guest hosts.
- Connect Family – Originally named Family Fun Day, the program was retitled early in April 2007 as Connect Family (borrowed from the network's on-air campaign of the same name); it was formally hosted by Ernest "Ernie D." Martinez and Blake Kuhre. Between songs, parents and children would discuss with the DJs how they spend time with one another, their family life and play contests for children to win prizes and entries into Radio Disney contests.
- For the Record with Laura Marano – A weekly one-hour show hosted by Austin & Ally star Laura Marano, chronicling her journey as she launches her career. This show closed in April 2016.
- Frequency Jam – A Friday night program which first introduced around 2002/2003, in which three songs would be played by DJs Ernest "Ernie D." Martinez or Blake Kuhre. The song with the most votes (via Radio Disney's website) would be the next song that would be played as the winner. Frequency Jam ended in February 2007 with the redesign of Radio Disney website.
- Morgan & Maddy in the Morning – hosted by Morgan Tompkins and Maddy Whitby started on April 1, 2013
- Nate and Megan in the Morning – A morning show hosted by Nate and Megan.
- Move It Party – Saturday weekend show hosted by Morgan Tompkins and Maddy Whitby
- Playhouse Disney – (Originally "Mickey and Minnie's Tune Time" from 1998 to February 2001) The program aired on Radio Disney weekdays during the school year from 12:00 to 1:00 pm. ET and was hosted by Robin, Tina, The Jonas Brothers and Susan Huber from its inception; it was also hosted by Betsy. Playhouse Disney was originally a two-hour block, but was later reduced to one hour; segments featured in the block included Circle Time Story (originally "Mickey and Minnie's Storytime Theatre" from 1998 to 2001), which featured read-along stories from Disney movies. Like the now-defunct Playhouse Disney block (succeeded by Disney Junior) on Disney Channel, it was targeted towards preschoolers. Songs for younger children were played along with trivia contests.

=== Serial radio ===
In July 2010, Radio Disney debuted its first scripted serial called My Dream, a contemporary story utilizing a format reminiscent of serials from the 1940s. Unlike Depression-era radio serials that typically featured episodes lasting 15 to 30 minutes, episodes of My Dream runs for only 90 seconds and play multiple times throughout the day. My Dream stars Daphne Blunt as a 14-year-old girl trying to make a name for herself in the music industry while dealing with the usual struggles, responsibilities and emotional ups and downs of an everyday teen.

=== Features and contests ===
Radio Disney carried a number of features from interactive contests to informational programs.

==== Final features ====
- Music Mailbag – The hour-long Saturday program. After a new song selected for entry into Radio Disney's regular playlist was played, listeners were urged to call into the network's hotline or vote on its website to "Pick It" (make the song part of the network's playlist rotation) or "Kick It" (reject it as an entry into the playlist). By the time the station shut down, voting was conducted via Twitter as the station's website was no longer used.
- 60 Seconds With (actor/actress/artist name) – A segment featuring minute-long excerpts from interviews and celebrity "takeovers".
- Grand Prize Drawing – Grand prize drawings often occur over the course of one to four weeks, depending on the contest. Contestants can win entries in a regular contest that contestant wins; contestants also periodically have the opportunity to win a "super entry", in which 100 entries for the drawing are entered into the contest. The winner of the grand prize will usually win a vacation, or a chance to meet a popular artist heard on Radio Disney or the opportunity to meet another celebrity. Drawings usually occur on a Friday.
- Planet Premiere – A music artist sits down with Ernest "Ernie D." Martinez or Candice Huckeba as their newest album or song is played on Radio Disney. Before each song plays, the artist tells the listeners how the song was conceived, and what its meaning was.
- Power Prize – The "Power Prize" occurs at least six times a day. A winner of a contest will not only win a super entry, but also a "power" prize. This started when Radio Disney stopped giving out prizes to every contest winner.
- Radio Rewind – A segment of a song was played backward and callers would try to guess the name of that song. The song would usually be played forward after someone wins.
- Sound File – The news on new music and artists (new entries appear weekly during the Top 10 Countdown).
- Super Entry – Winners of a contest receive 100 entries into the grand prize drawing. When the "super entry" first started, the winner would get 40 entries.
- TBT Top 3 – Throwback Thursday Top 3, A long time segment That Plays Throwback Songs, But not that far back. and after that, a caller would try to guess 3 songs, and a caller will win.
- Title Text – A segment that a DJ says the first letter for each word of a song, and callers would try to guess the full words of the song, and will play after someone wins. (For Example: C, S, T, F,: Can't Stop the Feeling (Timberlake).)

==== Former features ====
Greyson Chance being interviewed during "Celebrity Take with Jake".

- ABC News for Kids Notebook – News updates from ABC News Radio which featured child-appropriate news updates and features segments.
- Aptitude Dude – voiced by Squeege.
- Backwards Bop – A small excerpt of a song was played backward, and callers would try to guess the name of that song.
- Battle of the Cities – A trivia game hosted by Mark and Zippy. Two contestants from different cities would call in and the caller with the most answers wins.
- Bumbling Bill's Safety Spotlight – Bumbling Bill and his friend Sally (Susan Huber) talk about what's safe and unsafe, with Bill (as his nickname indicates) would riskily perform the act. In a running gag, Bumbling Bill would often malaprop Sally's name and she would correct him ("Sally!") to which he would always reply "Whatever." This program ended near the beginning of 2006.
- Celebrity Take with Jake – A pre-recorded segment hosted by Jake Whetter, providing celebrity news stories focusing on actors and music artists popular with the network's target demographic.
- Code Word of the Day – The "Code Word of the Day" is given out about five times an hour. If a caller knows the code word when they calls Radio Disney's hotline (usually around 6:30 pm. ET), that person is awarded a prize. This program ended in mid 2017.
- ESPN Sports for Kids - Sports news and some health tips.
- Grandma Nature
- Garage Door Derby – A contest hosted by DJ Aaron K. in which two callers would call in and participate in a race to see whose garage door closed the fastest. The first to say, "It's open!" or "It's closed!" would win a prize.
- Gross Me Out – "Gross Me Out" was a longtime segment that talked about gross things which kids often like to hear.
- Hairbrush Karaoke – Similar to the "Karaoke" game with DJ Kara. DJ Susan Huber would get a caller to sing karaoke on the radio, and then they would win a prize. This ended when Susan Huber left Radio Disney.
- Hogwarts or Hogwash – A game played by DJ Aaron K. The correct caller must answer three out of four questions from the popular Harry Potter book and/or film series as true or false, by saying "Hogwarts" for being true and "Hogwash" for being false.
- Incubator – A segment played between songs or during commercial breaks featuring interviews with up-and-coming music artists.
- Karaoke – A contest held by retired DJ Kara Edwards. She would sing one line of a song, and the correct caller would sing the other.
- Laugh Shack – Kids would call in and leave jokes on the network's voicemail (or "earmail") number. The jokes would then later be aired on the radio.
- Let's Make a Deal – Another game/contest hosted by Mark and Zippy. This was a parody of the television game show of the same name.
- NBT (Next Big Thing) – This segment was hosted by Jake Whetter, and is similar to the former Incubator feature. Each year since the contest launched in 2008, Radio Disney plays new songs by five up-and-coming music artist that are contestants; listeners are able to vote for which contestant moves on to the next round of the competition until a winner is chosen.
- Theatre of the B-zarre – An interstitial segment that ended around mid-2006, in which Dr. B and a hairball-like creature named Critter talk about strange and creepy things.
- The Adventures of Bud and Iggy – A contest that centered on two unheard characters, Bud and Iggy, who are always getting lost. Clues were given as to what city the two are lost in. This longtime contest ended near the end of 2003.
- The Answer is Always "C." – The DJ would give a caller a multiple-choice question, or questions, but a winner would almost always be assured, as the answer was always the "C." choice.
- The State Game – Three clues about a state were given out (the state nickname and two facts) and callers would try to guess what state it is. This game was played by B.B. Good and Sherry.
- Thinkenstein: 2000 – A segment featuring Dr. Thinkenstein (voiced by Clint Ford) a wild, hyperactive scientist with a Karloff-esque voice, who routinely examined technologies and breakthroughs that other scientists were currently working on to improve the future. He frequently discussed his findings with his computer assistant, "I.gor" (nicknamed "E-dot").
- Your Music, Your Way a.k.a. Your Music & Your Stars, Your Way

== Radio Disney Music Awards ==
From 2001 to 2019, Radio Disney held an annual awards ceremony, the Radio Disney Music Awards, to honor popular music artists featured on the network. Similar to the Teen Choice Awards and Nickelodeon Kids Choice Awards (aired on rival channels), teenagers would vote to select the winner of each category including Best Female Artist, Best Male Artist, Best Music Group, Song of the Year, Best New Artist, Fiercest Fans, Artist with the Best Style, Most Talked About Artist and more. Hilary Duff is the biggest winner with 18 awards and 35 nominations. After 2007, the ceremony went on a five-year hiatus before returning in 2013. Beginning in 2014, it was televised on Disney Channel. In 2019, the ceremony was renamed the "ARDYs". No ceremony was held in 2020 due to the COVID-19 pandemic, though a pre-recorded special entitled Radio Disney Presents ARDYs Summer Playlist aired in place of the ceremony that same year. After Disney announced in December of that same year that Radio Disney would be shut down in the first quarter of 2021, the awards ceremony was quietly discontinued.

== Radio Disney World Tours ==
In 2000 and 2001, Radio Disney launched two separate "world tours" that traveled to major U.S. cities including Atlanta, New York City, Boston, Dallas, Chicago, Houston, Phoenix, Los Angeles, San Francisco and Seattle. In 2000, the tour featured up-and-coming talent (No Authority, Myra) and then Radio Disney DJs, Mark and Zippy. The tour played in theatrical venues and had audiences of up to 2,000 people per show (there were four shows each weekend in each city).

A 2002 World Tour was teased on the Radio Disney website, but eventually ended up being canceled.

== Other networks ==
=== Radio Disney Networks ===
Radio Disney, Inc.
- Trade name: Radio Disney Networks
- Type: Subsidiary
- Industry: Broadcasting
- Founded: 1996; 30 years ago
- Defunct: February 2021
- Headquarters: 3800 Alameda Avenue, Burbank, United States
- Number of locations: 1
- Key people: Phil Guerini (General Manager); Sean Cocchia (EVP, Business Operations, Disney Channels Worldwide); Ivan Heredia (VP, Marketing); Ray De La Garza (VP, Programming); Gary Marsh (President and CCO, Disney Channels Worldwide)
- Services: Radio network
- Parent: Disney Channels Worldwide (Walt Disney Television)
- Divisions: Radio Disney; Radio Disney Country; Radio Disney Junior; Radio Disney Group; KRDC

Radio Disney Networks is an American radio network that is owned by Disney Channels Worldwide, Inc., a subsidiary of Walt Disney Television, a primary component of The Walt Disney Company's Disney Media Networks segment. Radio Disney Networks broadcasts three separated digital channels, Radio Disney, Radio Disney Country and Radio Disney Junior, via radio station's HD channel or by online stream sites. The original Radio Disney network play music and other content aimed at preteens and young teenagers; it can be described as a youth-targeted contemporary hit radio format with heavy emphasis on teen idols. Recently Radio Disney has become a Mainstream Top 40 Indicator reporter on Nielsen-BDS eventually being upgraded to monitored status with Nielsen-BDS. Radio Disney is also a monitored reporter on the Mediabase 24/7 Top 40 panel. The network is headquartered in Burbank, California.

Radio Disney Junior was available via the Watch Disney Junior app in August 2014. On November 4, 2015, Radio Disney Networks launched a country music-focused internet radio station, Radio Disney Country. Disney Channels Worldwide replaced its Watch app series with the singular, DisneyNow, which combines its TV and radio channels the week of September 29, 2017. On November 13, 2014, Radio Disney and Radio Disney Junior became available on Slacker Radio with Radio Disney's Top 30 Countdown starting on November 15, 2014.

=== Radio Disney Country ===
Radio Disney Country
- Logo of Radio Disney Country on its only affiliate, KRDC
- Type: Radio network
- Country: United States

History
- Launch date: November 4, 2015
- Closed: December 31, 2020; (5 years, 57 days)

Coverage
- Affiliates: See list

Links
- Website: radio.disney.com

Radio Disney Country was a country music focused internet radio network that launched on November 4, 2015, and was initially exclusive to Radio Disney's own digital platforms. The service focused upon current songs, current and past material from popular artists, and pop songs featuring country musicians. Guerini explained that the format of the channel was meant to allow it to draw from a wider range of songs than traditional country radio stations, owing to the format's "embrace" of rock, hip-hop and pop-oriented songs (with Rolling Stone noting its airplay of Lil Nas X's Western-trap song "Old Town Road" in 2019 as an example of this strategy). The network's launch coincided with the 2015 CMA Awards. Like its sister station, Radio Disney Country emphasized current hits and used little recurrent rotation.

On June 9, 2017, Disney announced that it would expand the network's distribution to include other digital platforms, such as iHeartRadio and TuneIn, as well as curated playlists on Apple Music and Spotify, and terrestrial radio with the flip of KDIS to the network as KRDC 99.1 FM and AM 1110 (the main Radio Disney network continued to be carried locally on a subchannel of KRTH until late 2018 when its contract to carry the network expired).

The station's Let the Girls Play segment premiered on December 5, 2018. In July 2019, Radio Disney Country opened a Nashville Music Row based studio. In July 2019, Disney agreed to license Radio Disney video content to Sheridan Broadcasting Corporation to telestream via a patented process the content to the web and the audio to a radio station, WIGO-AM, as The Radio Disney Hour (working tile).

Radio Disney Country's targeted audience was women aged 18 to 34 years old. The network's mix of music would be every thing with 60% popular artists and 40% up and coming artists. It ceased in the afternoon of December 31, 2020.

=== Radio Disney Junior ===
Radio Disney Junior logo.

On February 14, 2011, a Radio Disney Junior block was launched in tandem with the Disney Junior on Disney Channel block. The hour-long block focused on music for the preschool age plus fun "audio theater" with Disney Junior characters. On May 30, 2014, Radio Disney Junior was spun off into its own station on the WATCH Disney Junior app, later becoming its own separate paid app in January 2016, and appearing to have been discontinued some time afterwards.

On October 1, 2024, a spiritual successor to Radio Disney Junior, Disney Jr. Radio would be launched on the SiriusXM app.

==== Programming ====
- Magical World of Disney Junior, Disney and Pixar movies music
- Pirates & Princesses, themed songs
- Get Up and Move, dedicated to health and wellness

== Stations ==
Despite being music-oriented, the network was carried primarily on AM stations. The Walt Disney Company owned most of the network's affiliates, though some stations were operated through local marketing agreements that had varying degrees of local management. The last separately-owned Radio Disney affiliate, WOLF in Syracuse, New York, left the network on February 1, 2014.

In addition to terrestrial stations, Radio Disney was also available nationally through XM Satellite Radio and Sirius, which merged into SiriusXM in 2008. In the Walt Disney World resort, the station was carried on channel 14 (later 32) on TVs in the Disney Resorts Collection.

On August 13, 2014, it was announced that all of Radio Disney's remaining stations, excluding KDIS, were to be sold in an effort to focus more on digital distribution of the Radio Disney network. KDIS would be retained to serve as the originator of Radio Disney's programming, and its operations was assumed by the network's national staff. However, Disney later announced that it would syndicate Radio Disney through affiliations with HD Radio subchannels.

A gray background indicates a station directly operated by the Walt Disney Company.

Former Radio Disney affiliates/owned stations
| Media market | State | Station | Affiliated | Disaffiliated | Notes |
|---|---|---|---|---|---|
| Birmingham | Alabama | WMKI | 1996 | 1999 | |
| Mobile | Alabama | WQUA | 2002 | 2005 | |
| Phoenix | Arizona | KMIK | 1998 | 2015 | |
| Little Rock | Arkansas | KRNN | 1999 | 2003 | |
| Little Rock | Arkansas | KDIS-FM | 2003 | 2013 | |
| Bakersfield | California | KMAP | 2000 | 2003 | |
| Fresno | California | KAVT | 2000 | 2008 | |
| Los Angeles-Disneyland | California | KDIS | 1997 | 2003 | |
| Los Angeles-Disneyland | California | KDIS | 2003 | 2017 | |
| Los Angeles-Disneyland | California | KRDC | 2020 | 2021 | |
| Sacramento | California | KIID | 2001 | 2015 | |
| San Bernardino | California | KKDD | 1998 | 2012 | |
| San Diego | California | KSON | 1998 | 2003 | |
| San Francisco | California | KMKY | 1997 | 2015 | |
| Denver | Colorado | KADZ | 1998 | 2003 | |
| Denver | Colorado | KDDZ | 1998 | 2015 | |
| Grand Junction | Colorado | KRDY | 1999 | 2000 | |
| Hartford–New Haven | Connecticut | WDZK | 1998 | 2010 | |
| Fort Myers | Florida | WMYR | 2000 | 2005 | |
| Gainesville | Florida | WAJD | 2000 | 2009 | |
| Jacksonville | Florida | WBWL | 2002 | 2010 | |
| Miami–Fort Lauderdale | Florida | WMYM | 1999 | 2015 | |
| Orlando-Walt Disney World | Florida | WDYZ | 2001 | 2015 | |
| Panama City | Florida | WDLP | 1999 | 2000 | |
| Tampa–St. Petersburg | Florida | WWMI | 1999 | 2015 | |
| West Palm Beach | Florida | WMNE | 1999 | 2010 | |
| Atlanta | Georgia | WDWD | 1996 | 2015 | |
| Augusta | Georgia | WBBQ | 1999 | 2000 | |
| Macon | Georgia | WNEX | 1999 | 2008 | |
| Macon | Georgia | WPGA | 1998 | 2008 | |
| Savannah | Georgia | WCHY | 1998 | 2002 | |
| Honolulu | Hawaii | KORL | 1999 | 2003 | |
| Chicago | Illinois | WRDZ | 1998 | 2015 | |
| Zion | Illinois | WDDZ | 1998 | 2000 | |
| Zion | Illinois | WDDZ | 2002 | 2002 | |
| Indianapolis | Indiana | WRDZ-FM | 2003 | 2015 | |
| Wichita | Kansas | KQAM | 2002 | 2010 | |
| Louisville | Kentucky | WDRD | 2002 | 2010 | |
| Baton Rouge | Louisiana | WYNK | 1998 | 2002 | |
| Lafayette | Louisiana | KDYS | 1997 | 2004 | |
| Monroe | Louisiana | KMBS | 1997 | 2000 | |
| New Orleans | Louisiana | WBYU | 2003 | 2011 | |
| Cumberland | Maryland | WDZN | 1998 | 2011 | |
| Salisbury | Maryland | WJDY | 1999 | 2002 | |
| Boston | Massachusetts | WMKI | 1997 | 2015 | |
| Detroit | Michigan | WFDF | 2002 | 2015 | |
| Grand Rapids | Michigan | WDSS | 2003 | 2008 | |
| Muskegon | Michigan | WKBZ | 2001 | 2001 | |
| Duluth | Minnesota | KXTP | 1998 | 2002 | |
| Minneapolis–Saint Paul | Minnesota | KDIZ | 1996 | 2015 | |
| St. Cloud | Minnesota | WBHR | 1998 | 2001 | |
| Kansas City | Missouri | KPHN | 2002 | 2013 | |
| St. Louis | Missouri | WSDZ | 1998 | 2015 | |
| Omaha | Nebraska | KOIL | 2006 | 2009 | |
| Omaha | Nebraska | KYDZ | 1999 | 2006 | |
| Albuquerque–Santa Fe | New Mexico | KALY | 2003 | 2010 | |
| Albuquerque–Santa Fe | New Mexico | KDEF | 2000 | 2003 | |
| Albuquerque–Santa Fe | New Mexico | KDZZ | 1997 | 1999 | |
| Albany–Schenectady | New York | WDDY | 2002 | 2013 | |
| Auburn | New York | WMBO | 1999 | 2013 | |
| DeRuyter | New York | WVOA-FM | 2001 | 2001 | |
| DeRuyter | New York | WVOA-FM | 2009 | 2009 | |
| Fulton | New York | WOSW | 2006 | 2012 | |
| Long Island | New York | WGSM | 1997 | 1998 | |
| Middletown | New York | WALL | 2005 | 2010 | |
| New York City | New York | WQEW | 1998 | 2015 | |
| Oswego | New York | WOLF-FM | 1999 | 2006 | |
| Oswego | New York | WOLF-FM | 2009 | 2009 | |
| Poughkeepsie | New York | WEOK | 2005 | 2010 | |
| Sylvan Beach | New York | WWLF-FM | 2001 | 2006 | |
| Syracuse | New York | WOLF | 1999 | 2014 | |
| Syracuse | New York | WSIV | —N/a | —N/a | |
| Syracuse | New York | WVOA | —N/a | 2001 | |
| Charlotte | North Carolina | WGFY | 1998 | 2015 | |
| Greensboro–Winston-Salem | North Carolina | WKEW | 1998 | 2000 | |
| Greensboro–Winston-Salem | North Carolina | WCOG | 2000 | 2010 | |
| Cleveland | Ohio | WWMK | 1998 | 2015 | |
| Oklahoma City | Oklahoma | KEBC | 2003 | 2013 | |
| Tulsa | Oklahoma | KMUS | 2004 | 2010 | |
| Portland | Oregon | KDZR | 2003 | 2015 | |
| Philadelphia | Pennsylvania | WWJZ | 1999 | 2015 | |
| Pittsburgh | Pennsylvania | WDDZ | 2011 | 2015 | |
| Pittsburgh | Pennsylvania | WWCS | 2001 | 2010 | |
| Providence | Rhode Island | WDDZ | 2001 | 2010 | |
| Providence | Rhode Island | WHRC | 1997 | 2001 | |
| Memphis | Tennessee | WOWW | 2000 | 2012 | |
| Corpus Christi | Texas | KRYS | 1997 | 2000 | |
| Dallas–Fort Worth | Texas | KMKI | 1998 | 2015 | |
| Houston | Texas | KMIC | 1999 | 2015 | |
| San Antonio | Texas | KRDY | 2003 | 2013 | |
| Waco | Texas | KWTX | 1998 | 2001 | |
| Salt Lake City | Utah | KBEE | 1996 | 2003 | |
| Salt Lake City | Utah | KWDZ | 2003 | 2013 | |
| Salt Lake City | Utah | KWDZ | 2014 | 2015 | |
| Norfolk | Virginia | WBVA | 2000 | 2001 | |
| Norfolk | Virginia | WHKT | 2001 | 2010 | |
| Norfolk | Virginia | WVAB | 2000 | 2001 | |
| Richmond | Virginia | WDZY | 1998 | 2013 | |
| Seattle–Tacoma | Washington | KKDZ | 1997 | 2015 | |
| Parkersburg | West Virginia | WKYG | 1998 | 2004 | |
| Milwaukee | Wisconsin | WKSH | 2002 | 2013 | |

=== HD Radio affiliates ===
| Media market | State/Terr. | Station | Freq. | Affiliated | Disaffiliated | Owner |
|---|---|---|---|---|---|---|
| Phoenix | Arizona | KOOL-HD3 | 94.5-3 | 2016 | 2018 | Entercom |
| Los Angeles | California | KRTH-HD2 | 101.1-2 | 2016 | 2018 | Entercom |
| Oakland–San Francisco | California | KLLC-HD3 | 97.3-3 | 2016 | 2018 | Entercom |
| Sacramento | California | KUDL-HD2 | 106.5-2 | 2017 | 2018 | Entercom |
| San Diego | California | KYXY-HD3 | 96.5-3 | 2016 | 2018 | Entercom |
| Denver | Colorado | KALC-HD3 | 105.9-3 | 2017 | 2018 | Entercom |
| Wilmington | Delaware | WJBR-HD2 | 99.5-2 | 2016 | 2018 | Beasley Broadcast Group |
| Fort Myers | Florida | WXKB-HD2 | 103.9-2 | 2016 | 2018 | Beasley Broadcast Group |
| Miami | Florida | WKIS-HD3 | 99.9-3 | 2016 | 2018 | Entercom |
| Tampa | Florida | WLLD-HD2 | 94.1-2 | 2015 | 2018 | Beasley Broadcast Group |
| Augusta | Georgia | WKXC-HD2 | 99.5-2 | 2015 | 2018 | Beasley Broadcast Group |
| Indianapolis | Indiana | WZPL-HD2 | 99.5-2 | 2017 | 2018 | Entercom |
| New Orleans | Louisiana | WLMG-HD2 | 101.9-2 | 2017 | 2018 | Entercom |
| Minneapolis–Saint Paul | Minnesota | KMNB-HD3 | 102.9-3 | 2016 | 2018 | Entercom |
| Kansas City | Missouri | KZPT-HD2 | 99.7-2 | 2017 | 2018 | Entercom |
| St. Louis | Missouri | KFTK-HD3 | 97.1-3 | 2017 | 2018 | Entercom |
| Las Vegas | Nevada | KCYE-HD2 | 102.7-2 | 2015 | 2017 | Beasley Broadcast Group |
| Las Vegas | Nevada | KCYE-HD3 | 102.7-3 | 2017 | 2018 | Beasley Broadcast Group |
| New York City | New York | WBMP-HD3 | 92.3-3 | 2015 | 2018 | Entercom |
| Charlotte | North Carolina | WNKS-HD2 | 95.1-2 | 2016 | 2018 | Beasley Broadcast Group |
| Fayetteville | North Carolina | WZFX-HD2 | 99.1-2 | 2016 | 2018 | Beasley Broadcast Group |
| Greensboro | North Carolina | WQMG-HD2 | 97.1-2 | 2017 | 2018 | Entercom |
| Greenville | North Carolina | WMGV-HD2 | 103.3-2 | 2016 | 2018 | Curtis Media Group |
| Portland | Oregon | KRSK-HD2 | 105.1-2 | 2017 | 2018 | Entercom |
| Philadelphia | Pennsylvania | WXTU-HD3 | 92.5-3 | 2015 | 2018 | Entercom |
| Bayamon | Puerto Rico | WXYX-HD2 | 100.7-2 | 2016 | 2018 | RAAD Broadcasting |
| Isabela | Puerto Rico | WELX-HD2 | 101.5-2 | 2016 | 2018 | RAAD Broadcasting |
| Lajas | Puerto Rico | WXLX-HD2 | 103.7-2 | 2016 | 2018 | RAAD Broadcasting |
| Santa Isabel | Puerto Rico | WXHD-HD2 | 98.1-2 | 2016 | 2018 | RAAD Broadcasting |
| Memphis | Tennessee | WRVR-HD2 | 104.5-2 | 2017 | 2018 | Entercom |
| Austin | Texas | KGSR-HD2 | 93.3-2 | 2017 | 2018 | Sinclair Telecable Inc. |
| Dallas–Fort Worth | Texas | KLUV-HD3 | 98.7-3 | 2016 | 2018 | Entercom |
| Houston | Texas | KHMX-HD3 | 96.5-3 | 2016 | 2016 | Entercom |
| Norfolk–Virginia Beach | Virginia | WPTE-HD2 | 94.9-2 | 2017 | 2018 | Entercom |
| Seattle | Washington | KSWD-HD3 | 94.1-3 | 2016 | 2018 | Entercom |
| Milwaukee | Wisconsin | WMYX-HD2 | 99.1-2 | 2017 | 2018 | Entercom |

== Radio Disney History of #1s ==
These songs hit No. 1 on Radio Disney's Top 50 Songs from 1997 to 2020.

- 1997: Will Smith – Men in Black
- 1998: Celine Dion – My Heart Will Go On
- 1999: Britney Spears – (You Drive Me) Crazy
- 2000: NSYNC – Bye Bye Bye
- 2001: NSYNC – Pop
- 2002: Avril Lavigne – Complicated
- 2003: Hilary Duff – Why Not
- 2004: Hilary Duff – Come Clean
- 2005: Bowling For Soup – 1985
- 2006: Hannah Montana – The Best of Both Worlds
- 2007: Jonas Brothers – SOS
- 2008: Jonas Brothers – Burnin' Up
- 2009: Taylor Swift – You Belong with Me
- 2010: Justin Bieber featuring Ludacris – Baby
- 2011: Selena Gomez & the Scene – Love You like a Love Song
- 2012: One Direction – What Makes You Beautiful
- 2013: One Direction – Best Song Ever
- 2014: Ariana Grande featuring Iggy Azalea – Problem
- 2015: Shawn Mendes – Stitches
- 2016: Daya – Sit Still, Look Pretty
- 2017: Julia Michaels – Issues
- 2018: Marshmello & Anne-Marie – Friends
- 2019: Shawn Mendes – If I Can't Have You
- 2020: BTS – Dynamite

== Albums ==
The Radio Disney Jams series CDs are various artists compilations of music featured on Radio Disney.

== International ==
Internationally, there are Radio Disney stations in Chile, Poland, Argentina, Paraguay, Nicaragua, Guatemala, Uruguay, Costa Rica, Panama, and the Dominican Republic. On October 21, 2010, Radio Disney launched in Brazil. From October 1, 2013, to July 28, 2022, Radio Disney was available in Russia via Disney.ru.

=== Latin America ===
Radio Disney is available in Latin America via terrestrial broadcast. Similar to Radio Disney in the U.S., it broadcasts in Spanish to Argentina, Bolivia, Chile, Nicaragua, Ecuador, Guatemala, Paraguay, Uruguay, Dominican Republic, Panama, Costa Rica, Mexico, Peru and in Portuguese to Brazil. Radio Disney Latin America is a separate operation and wasn't affected by the decision to shutter Radio Disney in the United States.

=== Europe ===
Radio Disney planned to begin broadcasting on the digital radio platform in the United Kingdom by the end of 2008. On July 6, 2007, Ofcom, the communications regulator of the United Kingdom, announced that the 4 Digital Group, a consortium headed by Channel 4 and featuring Emap, UTV, British Sky Broadcasting, Global Radio, Carphone Warehouse and UBC, had been awarded a license to run a new digital radio multiplex which would include Radio Disney as one of ten new national radio stations. On October 10, 2008, Channel 4 withdrew plans to launch 4 Digital, ending the probability of Radio Disney launching on the service.

A similar station, Capital Disney began broadcasting in 2002 on the DAB digital radio network, on Sky Digital (Digital Satellite) and various digital cable television providers in the UK. The station was a joint venture between the UK's Capital Radio Group and Disney. The idea was to use Capital Radio's programming experience to assist Disney in launching a radio station in the UK. In early 2007, both Capital Radio (by now called GCap Media) and Disney agreed to pursue different goals, and as a result, Capital Disney closed down on June 29, 2007.

== See also ==
- Radio Disney Group
- Cumulus Media Networks (formerly ABC Radio Networks and Citadel Media)
- List of children's radio networks
- ESPN Radio
- Nick Radio (a similar radio network launched by Nickelodeon and iHeartMedia in 2013)
- Teen pop
- Bubblegum pop
