= Rural Radio Network =

Pioneering FM radio network in New York State (1948–1981)

Primary coverage of the six Rural Radio Network stations in late 1948. Each station was originally equipped with a 250 watt General Electric transmitter and four-section RCA Pylon horizontally polarized antenna, providing 1.3 kW ERP.

The Rural Radio Network (RRN) was an interconnected group of six commercial FM radio stations spread across upstate New York and operated from Ithaca, New York—the first all-radio, no-wireline network in the world. It began operation in 1948 as an innovative broadcast service to the agricultural community, but competition from television—and a lack of affordable, well-performing FM receivers—caused the founders' original business plan to fail. The stations changed ownership, as well as Radio formats, several times in futile attempts to achieve profitability. Perhaps the group's most notable owner was the Christian Broadcasting Network, headed by televangelist Pat Robertson, which acquired the stations through a corporate donation in 1969. A decade later, Robertson decided to sell the stations and the licenses were gradually transferred to individual owners in 1981 and 1982, thus dissolving one of the nation's earliest FM networks.

== Network history through 1981 ==
=== Planning ===
The concept of building the world's first farmer-owned network originated at the Cooperative Grange League Federation Exchange (commonly known as "GLF"), an agricultural co-op founded in 1920 in Ithaca, which later merged with another co-op to form the Agway organization that remains today. GLF, also noted for its role in founding the P&C Foods supermarket chain, began to use radio several years before the start of World War II and later assembled an informal network of about ten AM stations, connected by leased telephone lines, over which a weekly five-minute program was aired. The value of this early "network" was proven during the war when GLF members found it difficult to attend regular meetings.

In December 1946, GLF's directors approved a plan to expand the use of radio and allocated $10,000 to form the Rural Radio Foundation, a non-profit organization that would embrace several agricultural interest groups including the New York State Grange, Dairymen's League, and New York Artificial Breeder's Co-op. This foundation, which formally incorporated on March 18, 1947, would be sole owner of a subsidiary commercial broadcasting corporation, The Rural Radio Network, Inc., with any operating profits to be turned back to the founding groups for educational and research purposes. Corporate officers included president H. L. Creal, vice-president Clifford Snyder, and secretary-treasurer George Slocum. They were convinced that the recently opened 88-108 MHz FM band offered superior reliability over AM "standard broadcast"—particularly before sunrise when many farmers would start their daily tasks—and broader opportunities to establish new stations where needed. In April 1947, GLF appropriated an additional $200,000 to launch the new FM network.

R. B. Gervan, head of GLF's Information Service, was granted a leave of absence from that position to serve as General Manager of RRN until it was well established. Robert B. Child, an experienced farm broadcaster, was hired away from Schenectady's WGY to serve as Program Director. Donald K. de Neuf was hired as Chief Engineer, and with optimism he began planning the network's technical facilities.

A primary objective was to provide satisfactory rural coverage throughout the "milkshed" of New York State extending from the Niagara Frontier to the Capital District, and north to the Saint Lawrence Valley. The network would be headquartered in Ithaca, near the geographical center of this region and home of the New York State College of Agriculture at Cornell University, the state's land grant institution. With the help of engineering consultants Dr. Miller McClintock, Murray Crosby, and William S. Halstead (the latter two would later develop an FM stereo system), six hilltop transmitter sites, each over 2,000 feet (610 m) AMSL and spaced roughly 50 miles (80 km) apart across line-of-sight paths, were identified and acquired for the project. Based on 50 μV/m (34 dBμ) rural service contour predictions, these stations would have a combined coverage area encompassing 118,000 farms, 76 percent of the total farms in New York state at that time. Space for RRN's studios and offices was leased in the existing Ithaca Savings Bank building at 306 East State Street in downtown Ithaca, and General Electric, which then manufactured broadcast products at the Electronics Park plant in nearby Syracuse, was chosen as the prime equipment supplier. Applications for the six FM construction permits were filed with the FCC in mid-July 1947 and granted three months later.

Original stations of the Rural Radio Network
Community of License	County	Nearby Metro Areas	Call Sign	Frequency	Transmitter Coordinates
Wethersfield	Wyoming	Buffalo	WFNF	107.7	42°37′23″N 78°17′16″W
Bristol Center	Ontario	Rochester	WVBT	101.9	42°44′47″N 77°25′35″W
Ithaca	Tompkins	Ithaca, Elmira	WVFC	95.1	42°23′13″N 76°40′10″W
DeRuyter	Madison	Syracuse	WVCN	105.1	42°46′58″N 75°50′28″W
Cherry Valley	Otsego	Utica, Albany	WVCV	101.9	42°47′36″N 74°41′41″W
Turin	Lewis	Watertown, Utica	WVBN	107.7	43°38′55″N 75°29′0″W

=== Station construction and configuration ===
A typical Rural Radio Network transmitter site. In 2001 when this photo of the Bristol Center facility was taken, a steel pole with four side-mounted antenna bays had long since replaced the original 1948 RCA Pylon atop the tower. The porch on the right side of the building formerly supported relay antennas to receive programming from Ithaca and Wethersfield.

Gervan had promised his managers that the network would be ready for operation by the summer of 1948, requiring de Neuf's engineering staff and contractors to construct transmitter buildings and towers through the winter season. The likelihood of heavy precipitation in upstate New York's snowbelt required temporary heated shells to be erected around each building site, allowing concrete to be poured and masonry work to proceed on schedule. The worst weather conditions, by far, were encountered at the Turin site on the highest point of the Tug Hill Plateau, a remote area due east of Lake Ontario known for record lake-effect snowfall. Pending installation of telephone service, RRN engineers assigned to each construction site kept in contact by means of high-band VHF mobile two-way radios that were later modified for remote-pickup use.

Meanwhile, the GLF laboratory began testing various AM/FM table radios to determine which product would be carried in its farm supply stores. None of the existing models offered sufficient sensitivity to perform at all locations within the network's expected coverage area, so North American Philips was contracted to design a special high-sensitivity GLF-branded "farm radio" and serve as its OEM. Designated the GLF model F-770, the set was priced at $87.50 (more than $700 in 2005 dollars after adjustment for inflation), a considerable expense for many farm families in 1948. A $15 two-section outdoor "turnstile antenna", manufactured by the Technical Appliance Corporation (TACO) of Sherburne, New York, was offered as an accessory.

Construction of five of the transmitter facilities concluded in time for the network to begin operation as scheduled, but the Turin site could not be completed until the fall of 1948. A major complication was the lack of electric power at Turin; the site was so remote that the local utility would not run lines, so a redundant pair of Smith-Meeker 15 kW Diesel generators were installed along with a 12,000-gallon fuel tank, sufficient to operate the station for four months.

Standard floor plan of an RRN transmitter building.

All six of the RRN transmitter buildings, which resembled small chalets, were constructed of masonry and wood from similar floor plans. A steeply pitched roof was included in the design to shed snow and provide more interior headroom in the attic. A two-car garage, furnace room, generator room, and shower were at ground level, with a water well drilled through the floor of the generator room. The first floor, which was nearly eight feet above ground, included the transmitter room, a small studio area for visiting guests, a kitchen and workbench area, and a small restroom. The attic was accessible by means of a staircase and served as a dormitory for the operating and maintenance engineers. Just outside the kitchen was a side porch where off-air relay receive antennas were installed on a wooden lattice. Behind each building was a 100-foot (30 m) self-supporting tower that supported a four-section aluminum RCA"Pylon" tubular slot antenna, 54 feet (16 m) high with a power gain of 6. de Neuf's choice of RCA's FM antenna over GE's competing "ring radiator" was likely based on the Pylon's reduced exposure to the elements, which would lessen the chances for VSWR problems during icing conditions.

RRN's original equipment list at each transmitter site also included:

- General Electric BT-1-A 250 W FM transmitter with Phasitron exciter
- General Electric BT-2-B 1 kW power amplifier (added in 1951)
- General Electric BC-1-A studio consolette
- General Electric FS-1-A monitoring speaker
- General Electric YDA-1 distortion and noise analyzer
- General Electric modulation and frequency monitor
- Dual RCA turntables
- Radio Engineering Labs 646-B tunable FM receiver
- Radio Engineering Labs 670-L crystal-controlled relay receivers
- Hoisington 16-element horizontally polarized collinear receive antenna
- 15 kW gasoline-fueled emergency generator

The downtown Ithaca studio was also primarily GE-equipped and employed an early GE 940 MHz studio-transmitter link to relay programs to the Ithaca transmitter at the highest point in Tompkins County, Connecticut Hill. RRN engineers also outfitted a remote broadcast trailer which was taken to county fairs, farm meetings, and other public gatherings. This had a public-address amplifier and 50 W transmitter (tuned to 153.59 MHz) capable of sending remote programming to the closest hilltop transmitter site, where it could then be relayed to the rest of the network.

When the network was originally constructed, the FCC had not yet authorized remote control of FM stations.Each of the six transmitter sites had to be staffed with a licensed engineer throughout the broadcast day; this was a significant operating expense in the network's early years.

=== Early programming ===
Re-created newspaper ad that appeared June 5, 1948, in The Ithaca Journal.

The Rural Radio Network's first day of operation was Sunday, June 6, 1948. According to a newspaper ad published the preceding day, the 1 p.m. inaugural program was a 15-minute feature entitled Radio for Rural People, followed by a 15-minute newscast. Several more farm-related programs, interspersed with musical interludes, aired until sign-off at 7:45 that evening.

RRN's initial schedule offered 9 1/2 hours of daily programming, beginning at 11:45 a.m. On December 6, 1948, service was expanded to fifteen hours, signing on at 6 a.m. with news and concluding at 9:15 p.m. with an evening prayer.

Some program highlights from that period:

- 6:55 a.m. – Johnny Huttar, RRN's farm reporter with the latest market reports, weather, farm news and answers to farm questions
- 8:30 a.m. – Claire's Scrapbook with Claire Banister, Kay Stevens, and Pat Landon, featuring household hints, fashion notes, poetry and recipes, and musical sketches
- 11:30 a.m. – Country Music
- 12:30 p.m. – Cornell Farm Hour
- 1:30 p.m. – Empire State School of the Air – educational programming targeted to Upstate New York classrooms
- 3:30 p.m. – Mail Box Tunes
- 5:00 p.m. – The Storyteller – children's program
- 6:30 p.m. – The Supper Serenaders

Program Director Bob Child decided against airing radio soap operas after a survey of farm women revealed that 25 percent found them objectionable. In the words of one respondent, "There is never a happy family life in the soap box opera type of program."

Several non-owned stations were affiliated with the Rural Radio Network during its first year of operation. The largest was William G. H. Finch's WGHF in New York City, which is known today as WFAN-FM, and others included WSLB-FM in Ogdensburg, New York; WFHA in Hartford, Connecticut; WACE-FM in Springfield, Massachusetts; and WFLY in Troy, New York. According to RRN's December 1948 program listing, WGHF cut away from the network at 8 p.m. each evening for a Spanish-language program entitled Programa Hispano.

Some of the individual RRN-owned stations also aired local segments from the studio facilities in each transmitter building. Thursday evenings at 7:30, WVBN in Turin carried a program called County Students Speak, while WFNF in Wethersfield featured the live music of a barbershop quartet. On Fridays at 6:30 p.m., WVBT in Bristol Center ran a local program called Canandaigua Review.

=== Weather Roundup ===
One of RRN's most popular daily features was a series of live weather reports from each of the hilltop transmitter sites, moving from west to east. At 12:15 p.m., an announcer in the downtown Ithaca studio would introduce the "roundup", then pause for a few seconds while the Bristol Center and Ithaca transmitters switched relay receivers. The engineer at Wethersfield would then fade down his relay receiver, switch on his mic, and report the readings of each of his weather instruments. By means of RRN's off-air relay system, this would be simulcast on the other five stations. After another pause, Bristol Center's engineer would go live—followed in turn by the Ithaca, DeRuyter, Turin and Cherry Valley transmitter staff—who would each flip the necessary switches to air their respective reports and relay the rest "down the line".

Early Weather Roundup aircheck from April 1949. The first report originates from the WFNF transmitter building on New York State Route 78 in Wethersfield, New York, and is followed by local observations from WVBT atop Worden Hill near Bristol Center, WVFC atop Connecticut Hill near Ithaca, WVCN in DeRuyter, the defunct WVBN in Turin, and WVCV in Cherry Valley. The program concludes with an official forecast from the US Weather Bureau in Albany.

In 1953, RRN was granted authority by the FCC to operate its outlying stations from Ithaca by remote control. With the elimination of attended transmitters, responsibility for Weather Roundup reports was delegated to other broadcasters around the state, who continued to support the program for the next two decades.

The final Weather Roundup aired June 4, 1968—two days before RRN/NERN's 20th anniversary.

=== Subsequent owners ===
On February 1, 1960, the network was purchased by the Ivy Broadcasting Company, a corporation headed by Woody Erdman, who also owned WTKO (AM) in Ithaca and WOLF (AM) in Syracuse. The group of FM stations was renamed the "Northeast Radio Network", and all stations received new call signs ending in "IV". Ivy filed in August 1961 to increase the effective radiated power of the stations, but only some of these requests were granted by the FCC.

In April 1966, Ivy sold the group of FM stations to Chenango and Unadilla Communications, a small upstate New York telephone company also known as C&U Telephone. However, in early 1968, C&U was acquired by Continental Telephone, a larger corporation. At that time, FCC regulations prohibited control of broadcast licenses by national phone companies of Continental's size, so the new parent was forced to divest the stations. This provided televangelist Pat Robertson the opportunity to acquire the five-station network, then valued at $600,000, as a tax-deductible gift. Robertson was already operating WYAH-TV and FM station WXRI in the Hampton Roads area of Virginia, and he incorporated the five upstate New York stations into his fledgling Christian Broadcasting Network on January 1, 1969. Christian programming for CBN Northeast, as the New York station group was then called, originated from the transmitter site of the Ithaca station, WEIV. During CBN's period of ownership, the stations underwent significant equipment upgrades, including installation of new RCA stereo transmitters and circularly polarized antennas. The off-air relay scheme was also eliminated in favor of Moseley PCL-303 950 MHz STLs between Ithaca and the outlying sites. In its earliest years of ownership, the fledgling CBN stations gained credibility in their communities and increased its listening audience in part because of its partnerships with Christian organizations that were meeting the needs of the community, including a new Teen Challenge Center in Ithaca (a drug rehabilitation center sponsored by the area Assembly of God churches) and The Love Inn ministry, which brought in up-and-coming musicians like Phil Keaggy and Ted Sandquist to the barn that housed their worship services in nearby Freeville and which was the brainchild of CBN station manager Scott Ross. The Sunday morning broadcast was a taped broadcast of the services of the Ithaca First Assembly of God Church, then pastored by Donald Minor. The CBN Northeast network operated through the 1980s, until the stations were sold individually to separate owners, thus breaking up one of the first FM radio networks in the country.

=== Successors ===
The Cherry Valley signal was the only one to retain its NERN/CBN callsigns, remaining on the air as WJIV 101.9. It has also retained a religious radio format since the Robertson era.

The DeRuyter license remains active as WCIS-FM 105.1, with a new tower but the original Rural Radio Network transmitter building. WCIS joined the Family Life Network in the late 2010s; WCIS was at the time of its acquisition the easternmost affiliate of Family Life, a network that covers all of the Rural Radio Network's former territory (it has since expanded further eastward). During the 2000s (decade), Clear Channel Communications owned the station, and on at least two occasions, Craig Fox's companies owned the station, with various, quickly-changing formats.

The Ithaca signal became WQNY 103.7, continuing to operate from the Connecticut Hill site that was the CBN network control point. Centrally located in a smaller market in Ithaca (as opposed to its counterparts, who serve bigger, more distant cities in Buffalo, Rochester, and Syracuse with rimshot signals), WQNY has been the most commercially successful of the network's stations, having earned top Arbitron ratings in the Ithaca market. WQNY is currently owned by Saga Communications.

The Bristol Mountain site remains in broadcast use, but not with the original RRN/NERN/CBN license. That station is now WAIO 95.1 Honeoye Falls, operating from Baker Hill, closer to Rochester. The current signal at the old Bristol Mountain facility, WNBL 107.3, is a newer license that was moved to Bristol in a frequency and location swap in 1999. Both stations are owned by iHeartMedia. WAIO runs an active rock radio format, while WNBL has changed radio formats frequently, currently running a 1980s-centered classic hits format.

The Wethersfield site remains on the air as WGR-FM 107.7, with a new tower and a substantially renovated transmitter building. It has had varying success with several radio formats in the Olean, Buffalo and Rochester markets and currently serves as an FM simulcast of WGR. Its current owner is Audacy.

The Turin transmitter building remains standing, but no broadcast station has operated there since WVBN went silent and radio service has never been restored to the town. The site now houses a microwave relay tower.
