= WAQX-FM =

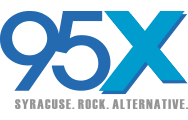
- Manlius, New York; United States
- Broadcast area: Syracuse metropolitan area; Central New York
- Frequency: 95.7 MHz
- Branding: 95X

Programming
- Format: Alternative rock
- Affiliations: Westwood One

Ownership
- Owner: Cumulus Media; (Radio License Holding CBC, LLC)
- Sister stations: WNTQ; WSKO

History
- First air date: August 23, 1978
- Call sign meaning: Wax, slang for phonograph records

Technical information
- Licensing authority: FCC
- Facility ID: 52606
- Class: B1
- ERP: 25,000 watts
- HAAT: 91 meters (299 ft)
- Transmitter coordinates: 43°00′24.7″N 76°05′38.0″W

Links
- Public license information: Public file; LMS
- Webcast: Listen live; Listen live (via iHeartRadio)
- Website: www.95x.com

WAQX-FM (95.7 FM) is a commercial radio station licensed to Manlius, New York, United States, featuring an alternative rock format known as "95X". Owned by Cumulus Media, the station serves the Syracuse metropolitan area of Central New York. Studios are located in Downtown Syracuse, while the transmitter resides in DeWitt.

In addition to a standard analog transmission, WAQX-FM is available online.

== History ==
On November 29, 1976, AGK Communications, Inc., a company owned by George Kimble, applied to the Federal Communications Commission (FCC) for a new radio station on 95.3 MHz to serve Manlius. The application competed against a bid from Manlius Broadcasting Co., which was owned by Craig Fox. The Kimble and Fox bids merged and won the construction permit on May 10, 1978. Construction immediately ensued on studios in the Market Place complex on Route 92, including Fox doing much of the construction himself as chief engineer, and with an album-oriented rock (AOR) format, WAQX began broadcasting on August 23, 1978. Fox, then 25, and two friends of his from Syracuse University felt that Syracuse could support a commercial AOR station; until then, WAER at the university and WOUR in nearby Utica were the only AOR stations serving the market.

The small WAQX, which went on the air with an effective radiated power of 410 watts, had only been on the air a year when format competition came in the form of a much stronger station: WSYR-FM 94.5, which dropped WAQX's ratings by a full point nearly immediately. An attempt at an "adult rock" format proved to be a disaster, but an upgrade to 3,000 watts and the sale of WSYR-FM and its flip to another format helped lead to a rebound. Ratings rose to double-digit shares in 1984 and 1985, a feat the station would only accomplish one other time—in 1994, when it made its lone appearance as the highest-rated station in Syracuse.

In 1988, after an upgrade in the station's transmitting facility and power prompted it to relocate from 95.3 to 95.7 MHz, Kimble and Fox negotiated the sale of the station to Atlantic Ventures Corporation, a Massachusetts company formed by former executives of the recently sold American Cablesystems, for $4.5 million. The deal also included a construction permit for a new radio station at 670 kHz which would have required a divestiture of a Fox station anyway; Fox owned WOLF (1490 AM), which for five years had simulcast WAQX on the AM band. New studios on James Street were built for WAQX. However, Atlantic soon unloaded WAQX, selling it at a $500,000 loss to Pilot Communications in 1990 to focus on its stations in Rochester and Boston. Neither of the partners in Pilot had owned a radio station before; Pilot would own seven stations in Syracuse and Augusta, Maine, when Broadcasting Partners, a unit of VS&A, invested in the group in 1997.

In 1999, Citadel Communications purchased WAQX and three other Syracuse stations as part of a $190 million purchase of Broadcasting Partners involving 36 stations in 11 markets. Citadel merged with Cumulus Media on September 16, 2011.
