= WMBO =

WMBO may refer to:

- WMBO (AM), a radio station (1340 AM) licensed to serve Auburn, New York, United States
- WSYR-FM, a radio station (106.9 FM) licensed to serve Solvay, New York, United States, which held the call sign WMBO-FM until 1970
- WNDR-LP, a low-power television station (channel 6) licensed to serve Auburn, New York, which held the call sign WMBO-LP from 2016 to 2017
- WVOA-LD, a low-power television station (channel 6) licensed to serve Westvale, New York, which held the call sign WMBO-LP from 1998 to 2013
- Wolf Moon Blood Orgy, a gag in the YouTube animated series Purgatony (Season 1, Episode 6) by Explosm
