= WNTQ =

Contemporary hit radio station in Syracuse, New York

Coordinates: 42.947°N 76.024°W

Syracuse, New York; United States
- Broadcast area: Syracuse metropolitan area
- Frequency: 93.1 MHz
- Branding: 93Q

Programming
- Language: English
- Format: Contemporary hit radio
- Affiliations: Westwood One

Ownership
- Owner: Cumulus Media; (Radio License Holding CBC, LLC)
- Sister stations: WAQX-FM; WSKO

History
- First air date: February 3, 1947
- Former call signs: WFBL-FM (1947–1955); WDDS (1956–1976)

Technical information
- Licensing authority: FCC
- Facility ID: 50514
- Class: B
- ERP: 97,000 watts
- HAAT: 201 meters (659 ft)

Links
- Public license information: Public file; LMS
- Webcast: Listen live; Listen live (via Audacy); Listen live (via iHeartRadio)
- Website: www.93q.com

WNTQ (93.1 FM, "93Q") is a commercial radio station in Syracuse, New York. It is owned by Cumulus Media and it broadcasts a contemporary hit radio format. The radio studios and offices are on James Street in Syracuse.

WNTQ is grandfathered at an effective radiated power (ERP) of 97,000 watts. That's nearly double of the 50,000-watt maximum for most stations in the Syracuse area. The transmitter is on Sevier Road at Sweet Road in Pompey.

== History ==
That station that today is WNTQ originally signed on the air on February 3, 1947. Its first call sign was WFBL-FM, broadcasting in the old FM band at 45.9 MHz. (The FM band was reallocated to the current 88-108 MHz spectrum a short time later). WFBL-FM was the sister station to WFBL 1390 AM. The two stations mostly simulcast and were network affiliates of the CBS Radio Network, carrying its dramas, comedies, news and sports during the "Golden Age of Radio".

WFBL-FM moved to 93.1 MHz the following year. Few people owned FM receivers in that era and reports show that WFBL-FM went off the air several years later. It returned to the air as WDDS, a call sign reportedly chosen because its beautiful music format was marketed to dentists' offices. The station has been in continuous operation since 1956. The call sign changed from WDDS to WNTQ on January 20, 1976.

WNTQ is known as a "grandfathered super-powered" FM station because its effective radiated power (ERP) of 97,000 watts exceeds the FCC Class B maximum of 50,000 watts. Likewise, WNTQ's height above average terrain (HAAT) of 201 meters (659 feet) exceeds the FCC maximum for a Class B facility of 150 meters (492 feet). The FCC rules determining the power and height maxima for Class B stations were not formed until 1964. Because WNTQ was operating at powers in excess of the FCC rules when they were adopted in 1964, WNTQ and several other Syracuse-area stations (94.5 WYYY and 104.3 WFRG) were grandfathered to be permitted to operate with power and height greater than what is allowed by today's rules. This makes WNTQ one of the more powerful stations in the region with great signal coverage.

WNTQ made its debut with its current Top 40 format in 1981. It competes with WWHT (HOT 107.9), owned by iHeartMedia and non-commercial Syracuse University student-run WJPZ (Z89). WNTQ's mass-appeal approach has resulted in 93Q beating HOT 107.9 in many ratings periods. When WNTQ launched in 1981, the station began competing against WKFM for the first four years of operation until WKFM dropped CHR in 1985, leaving WNTQ as the only CHR station in the Syracuse market.

WNTQ was owned by Citadel Broadcasting until that company's merger with Cumulus Media on September 16, 2011. Long-time Syracuse disc jockeys were among the top personalities at 93Q. Dave Laird and Ted Long in the Morning. Rob Cunningham middays. Bob Brown in the afternoon. Gary Dunes at night. Kenny Dees overnight. Also, Jim Shields, Brian Ocean, Dollar Bill, Jack Strap, and Mike Andrews were all on-air talents. Dave Edwards was the station's engineer and was also responsible for "Teen Talk", program on Sunday nights designed to help troubled youngsters with their issues. Mike Andrews wrote and produced WNTQ's Thursday Top 40 countdowns hosted by Gary Dunes, and Kenny Dees had Central New York's hottest dance shows on Saturday nights called "Club Beat".

=== Past Air Talent from 93Q ===
- American Top 40 with Ryan Seacrest (Moved to Hot 107.9)
- "Big" Jim Donovan
- Brandon C (Worked Monday-Friday evenings and did the Top 5 At 9. Later Moved To Movin 100.3 & 96.5 (WMVN) in Syracuse. Later at WSKS/WSKU in Utica, NY).
- Brian Ocean (Went on to work as a Television Engineer)
- Brian Phillips (On 93Q from time to time usually during the weekends)
- Dennis Crawford (Previously worked on 93Q Saturday and Sunday evenings)
- Ellie Cruz (Moved to WAQX-FM, now lives in Tallahassee)
- Gary Dunes (Remained in the Syracuse market as a Program Director & Morning Drive Host at WSEN 92.1, WZUN Sunny 102 & RadioHits.us)
- Jack Ryan (Previously worked on 93Q, moved to San Diego for an alternative station, moved back to CNY and was later at WAQX-FM).
- Katie Gray (Previously worked on 93Q Sunday evenings)
- Kevin Charles (Previously worked on 93Q in the evenings)
- Mike Cauchon (Now an actor)
- Rick Dees Weekly Top 40 (Syracuse's affiliate, which ran throughout the 1980s)
