= WMVN =

WMVN may refer to:

- WMVN (FM), a radio station (100.3 FM) licensed to Sylvan Beach, New York, United States
- WCIO, a radio station (96.7 FM) licensed to Oswego, New York, United States, which used the call sign WMVN from September to December 2009
- WXOS, a radio station (101.1 FM) licensed to East St. Louis, Illinois, United States, which used the call sign WMVN from 2006 to 2008
- WZAM, a radio station (970 AM) licensed to Ishpeming, Michigan, United States, which used the call sign WMVN from 1982 to 1984 and from 1987 to 1995
