= WWLF =

WWLF may refer to:

- WWLF-LD, a low-power television station (channel 35) licensed to serve Syracuse, New York, United States
- WCIO, a radio station (100.3 FM) licensed to Sylvan Beach, New York, which held the call sign WWLF-FM from 2009 to 2016
- WMBO (AM), a radio station (1340 AM) licensed to Auburn, New York, which held the call sign WWLF from 2000 to 2013
