= WCDO =

WCDO can refer to:

- WCDO (AM), a radio station at 1490 AM licensed to Sidney, New York
- WCDO-FM, a radio station at 100.9 FM licensed to Sidney, New York
