= Buckley Broadcasting =

American radio broadcasting company

Buckley Radio
- Industry: Entertainment
- Headquarters: Greenwich, Connecticut
- Products: radio

Buckley Broadcasting (or Buckley Radio) was an American broadcasting company that previously held radio stations in the states of New York, Rhode Island, California and Connecticut.

== History ==
Buckley Broadcasting Radio was founded in 1954 as Buckley-Jaeger Broadcasting. Richard D. Buckley Sr and John Jaeger were the original founding partners. It began as an independently owned radio broadcasting company. WNEW in New York City was the station's first acquisition, but the company resold that station to Metromedia in 1955. In 1957, the station bought its first long-term asset, WHIM in Providence, Rhode Island. In 1959, it bought WDRC in Hartford, Connecticut, and soon after launched its flagship station WDRC-FM.

Following the death of his father in 1972, Richard D. Buckley Jr. became the president and chairman of the company, a position he held until his death in 2011. Buckley acquired WOR in New York City in 1989. Buckley began divesting its stations shortly before Buckley Jr.'s death. WSEN, WSEN-FM, and WFBL in Syracuse, New York, were divested to local owners in 2008, eventually landing in the hands of Craig L. Fox. WOR was sold to Clear Channel Communications in 2012. WDRC and WDRC-FM were sold in early 2014 to Connoisseur Media of Bloomfield. Stations KSEQ in Fresno and KWAV in Monterey were then sold soon after that year, and its stations in Bakersfield, California (KLLY, KKBB and KNZR) and Merced, California (KUBB and KHTN) were sold to Alpha Media in October 2014.

== People ==
Richard D. Buckley: President, 1972-2011 Richard D. Buckley was born in Bronxville, New York. After the death of his father in 1972, Richard D. Buckley became the president of the company. He began his broadcasting career as a page in 1960 at the National Broadcasting Company. He has served in the broadcasting company for over 50 years, until his death in August 2011. During his time as chairman of the company, he refused to sell his independent and family owned business. In early 2011 he was inducted into the Hall of Fame of the New York State Broadcasters’ Association. Buckley was the past chairman of the Board of Radio Advertising Bureau and of the Board of the Southern California Broadcasters’ Association. Richard D. Buckley died on July 31, 2011.

Joe Bilotta: President & Chief Operating Officer, 2011-2014 Joe Bilotta has served Buckley Radio for over 40 years prior to his appointment of President following the death of Richard D. Buckley.

== Lynne Berke, et al. v. Buckley Broadcasting Corporation WOR Radio ==
On April 30, 2003, the Superior Court of New Jersey decided the case Lynne Berke, et al. v. Buckley Broadcasting Corporation WOR Radio. The plaintiffs, Lynne Berke et al. were around 300 investors in a cable television security that was advertised on WOR Radio, owned by Buckley Broadcasting. Talk show host, Harry I. “Sonny” Bloch advertised this cable television security on WOR Radio. The plaintiffs commenced action in Federal Court against Bloch, who died during the pendency of the action. However, since the advertising ceased in 1994 and the appeal was made 2001, the court dismissed the appeal as untimely under the statute of limitations.
