= WVBN (Turin, New York) =

Radio station in Turin, New York (1948–1951)

Turin, New York; United States
- Broadcast area: Black River Valley
- Frequency: 107.7 MHz

Ownership
- Owner: Rural Radio Network
- Sister stations: WFNF, WVBT, WVCN, WVCV, WVFC

History
- First air date: October 1948
- Last air date: 1951

Technical information
- ERP: 1,300 watts
- HAAT: 215 meters (705 ft)
- Transmitter coordinates: 43°38′55″N 75°29′00″W

WVBN (107.7 FM) was a commercial radio station located atop Gomer Hill in the Town of Turin, New York, which began broadcasting in October 1948 on 107.7 MHz with an effective radiated power of 1.3 kW at 215 meters (705 ft) above average terrain. It was the northernmost of six owned-and-operated stations of the Rural Radio Network (RRN), an innovative broadcast service for upstate New York farmers, and the first radio station in Lewis County, New York. Launched when a scant five-to-ten percent of rural households had acquired FM receivers, WVBN's relatively weak signal and narrowly targeted programming failed to reach a significant audience. After suffering severe financial losses, RRN decided to surrender the WVBN license in 1951 and the FM allocation to Turin was permanently deleted.

== History ==
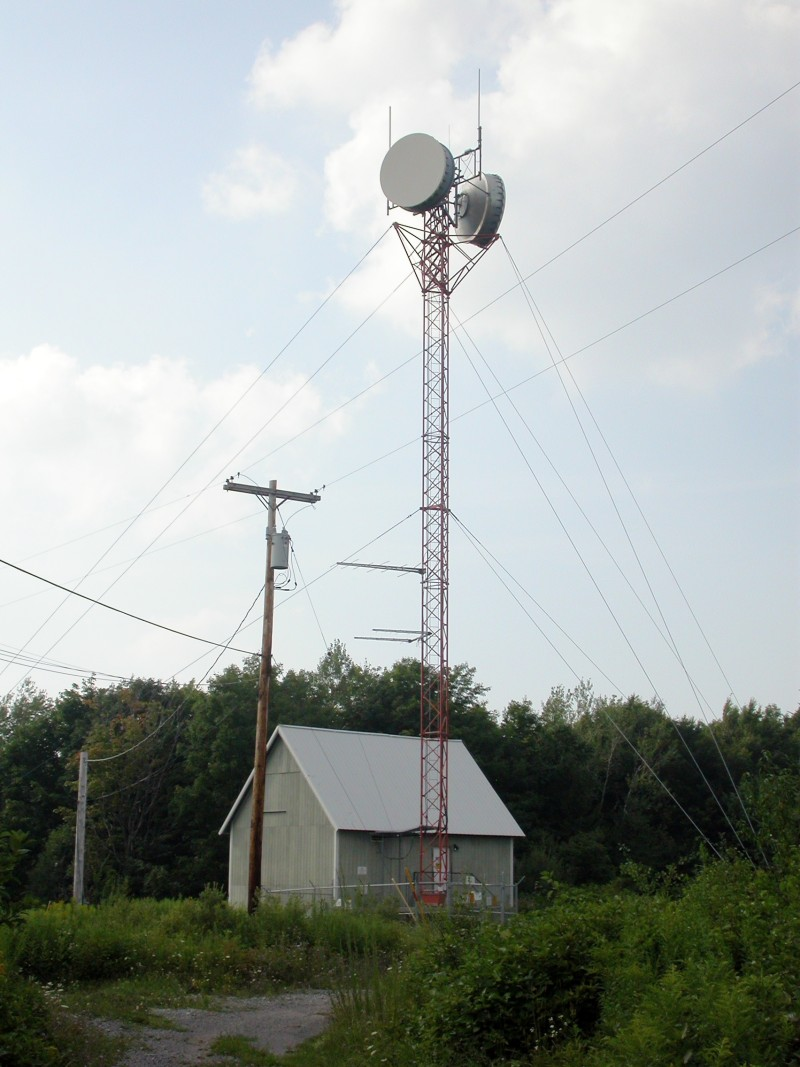
August 2005 photo of the former WVBN transmitter site atop Gomer Hill in Turin, now occupied by a cable TV microwave relay facility. A self-supporting tower, topped with an RCA four-section FM transmitting antenna, once stood behind the building. Utility power became available on the hilltop after a nearby air traffic control communications site was established.

In an attempt to provide maximum regional coverage at minimum operating expense, RRN's consulting engineers recommended that the network's six transmitting sites should be spaced roughly 80 kilometers (50 mi) apart and built on "commanding elevations" at least 610 meters (2,000 ft) AMSL. For WVBN, the planners selected a remote summit known as Gomer Hill, the highest point in Lewis County, New York, and the peak of the Tug Hill Plateau, a sparsely populated wooded region directly east of Lake Ontario known for dramatic deposits of lake effect snow. Approximate coordinates: 43°38′55″N 75°29′00″W

The Federal Communications Commission granted WVBN's construction permit on October 15, 1947, but with winter conditions quickly approaching, construction of the transmitter building and tower at Turin could not start until spring of 1948. While the other five RRN stations began offering programming on June 6, 1948, WVBN did not begin operating until mid-October of that year. Another complication at that time was the lack of utility power on Gomer Hill; two Smith-Meeker 15 kW Diesel generators and a 45-kiloliter (12,000 U.S. gal) fuel tank had to be installed on site before any broadcast equipment could be turned on. Most of WVBN's programming originated at RRN's main studio in Ithaca and was relayed through sister station WVCN in DeRuyter. A daily highlight was the "Weather Roundup", which featured meteorological observations from each of the six stations.

WVBN "Weather Roundup" report from April 1949, voiced by transmitter engineer Phil Glazier.

WVBN's transmitter house was nearly identical in appearance to the masonry and wood buildings constructed at the other five RRN stations. It was vacant for many years after the station's demise, but later acquired by Eastern Microwave, a cable-TV distribution service known today as Intermedia. The original 30-meter (98 ft) self-supporting tower, which once held an RCA Pylon antenna, was dismantled and replaced with a new guyed microwave tower following the sale of the site to Eastern. To improve security and reduce maintenance, the building's exterior has been sheathed with plywood paneling, but retains a steeply pitched roof common to the other structures. The present owner of the property is American Tower Corporation, which offers antenna rental space.

== Operational challenges ==
Operating expenses for WVBN likely exceeded the cost of running any of the other RRN stations, none of which turned a profit. Until 1953, the FCC required FM stations to assign a licensed operator at each transmitter site. In the winter, the rural roads leading to the snowy hilltop became impassable after heavy lake-effect snowfalls, making it difficult for operators to reach the site. Diesel fuel and generator maintenance also posed a significant financial burden.

Although WVBN's HAAT exceeded 200 meters (660 ft), its 1.3 kW power would only qualify as a Class A FM facility at that height under today's standards. The resulting 1 mV/m primary coverage contour reached less than halfway to the closest cities of Rome and Watertown. If the Turin FM facility (several kilometers north of latitude 43º30' in FM "Zone II") had survived past 1962, the FCC would have designated it a Class C allocation, providing the opportunity for future licensees to increase WVBN's power to 100 kW and HAAT to 600 meters (2,000 ft)—a super-regional signal that could have been a contender in the radio markets of Syracuse, Utica-Rome, and Watertown, possibly listenable from Rochester to Albany and as far north as the Canadian capital of Ottawa, Ontario. (On the station's western end, however, it would have had to contend with its sister station in Wethersfield, which also operated on 107.7, and it may have been prevented from achieving that level of power because a station in Syracuse, now WWHT, signed on to the adjacent 107.9 frequency in 1956.)

Around 1951, as RRN's operating deficit continued to mount, the decision was made to cease operations at WVBN, and since the station license had no value to any prospective buyers, it was returned to the FCC for cancellation.

Local broadcast service to Lewis County's Black River Valley was restored in June 1955 when WBRV, a 1 kW daytime AM station licensed to Boonville, began operating from a Quonset hut on New York State Route 12D, about 13 kilometers (8.1 mi) south of Turin village.
