= WOSW =

- Fulton, New York; United States
- Broadcast area: Syracuse metropolitan area; Oswego, New York
- Frequency: 1300 kHz
- Branding: Fox Sports

Programming
- Format: Sports radio
- Affiliations: Fox Sports Radio

Ownership
- Owner: Craig Fox; (Foxfur Communications, LLC)
- Sister stations: WFBL; WMBO; WMVN; WOLF; WOLF-FM; WQSE-LD; WSEN; WVOA

History
- First air date: August 22, 1949 (as WOSC)
- Former call signs: WOSC (1949–1988); WZZZ (1988–2002); WAMF (2002–2012)

Technical information
- Licensing authority: FCC
- Facility ID: 52370
- Class: D
- Power: 1,000 watts day; 40 watts night
- Transmitter coordinates: 43°17′41″N 76°26′35″W
- Translator: 98.5 W253BZ (Fulton)

Links
- Public license information: Public file; LMS

WOSW (1300 AM) is a radio station licensed to Fulton, New York, United States. The station serves the northern suburbs of the Syracuse area. WOSW is owned by Craig Fox's Wolf Radio, through licensee Foxfur Communications, LLC.

== History ==
The station went on the air as WOSC on August 22, 1949. By the late 1960s, the station programmed a format of pop and easy rock music, local and Mutual network news, and popular local personalities such as Carl Dunn in the morning, Frank Dale, Bob Putnam, Pat Riley, and Dave Kramer throughout the day. Manager Robert Rooney kept the station glued to the local news events. During this time, the co-owned WOSC-FM became the first FM station to program rock and roll on FM in central New York. In 1972, recent Syracuse University graduate Peter McElvein took over the morning program and, later that year, attained the highest ratings in its history, fifth overall out of more than 15 Syracuse stations, although the station was 22 miles (35 km) away from Syracuse. By the mid-1980s the station was briefly silent and then it returned to the air as WZZZ on June 19, 1988. On August 16, 2002, the station changed its call sign to WAMF, and again to the current WOSW on June 1, 2012.

During the time as WAMF, the station broadcast as an affiliate of Radio Disney. The format changed to classic country in September 2012, branded as "Real Country 1300". During this time, it was unknown whether or not the Real Country satellite network was being used. WOSW also carried NASCAR races from the Motor Racing Network.

In 2015, the station began simulcasting the sports format on WOLF.

In late June 2016, the station's format was temporarily changed to country to facilitate a trade of sister station WOLF-FM with Family Life Network. This arrangement was required in order for the then-station owner to comply with the multiple ownership rule set forth by the Federal Communications Commission. Family Life temporarily simulcast the station on its WOLF-FM until the consummation was completed in August 2017.

Effective August 21, 2017, Cram Communications sold WOSW to Pathway Community Radio, Inc. for $20,000. The transaction was largely a paper transaction as Craig Fox controls both companies; Sinan Mimaroglu, the other major stakeholder in the company, operates Armstrong Transmitter Corporation, which sells broadcasting equipment. The station went silent that day.

Effective February 21, 2020, Pathway Community Radio sold WOSW to Craig Fox's Foxfur Communications, LLC for $25,000.

WOSW has been listed as silent since July 15, 2021.

WOSW 1300 kHz along with its FM translator W253BZ at 98.5 MHz serving Fulton/Oswego currently simulcasts WOLF's sports radio format.
