= WFBL =

Simulcast of WSEN
- Syracuse, New York; United States
- Broadcast area: Syracuse, New York
- Frequency: 1390 kHz
- Branding: The Dinosaur

Programming
- Format: Classic hits
- Affiliations: Compass Media Networks; Westwood One

Ownership
- Owner: Craig Fox; (Wolf Radio, Inc.)
- Sister stations: WMBO; WMVN; WOLF; WOLF-FM; WOSW; WQSE-LD; WSEN; WVOA

History
- First air date: November 19, 1924 (1922 when including WLAH)
- Former call signs: WFBL (1924–1989); WLLF (1989); WFBL (1989–1993); WDCW (1993–2003)
- Call sign meaning: None (sequentially assigned, although later slogans have included "When Feeling Blue, Listen" and "First Broadcasting License")

Technical information
- Licensing authority: FCC
- Facility ID: 34821
- Class: B
- Power: 5,000 watts
- Transmitter coordinates: 43°9′10″N 76°11′35″W
- Translator: 107.5 W298DC (Liverpool)

Links
- Public license information: Public file; LMS
- Webcast: Listen live
- Website: dinofm.com

WFBL (1390 kHz) is a commercial AM radio station licensed to Syracuse, New York, and owned by Wolf Radio, Inc. The studios and offices are on W. Kirkpatrick St. in Syracuse. Since September 2017. the station has simulcast Craig Fox's "Dinosaur Radio" classic hits format. The programming originates on WSEN (103.9 FM).

WFBL is powered at 5,000 watts. To protect other stations on 1390 AM, it uses a directional antenna with a three-tower array. The transmitter is on Wetzel Road at Henry Clay Boulevard in Liverpool, New York. Programming is also heard on 250-watt FM translator W298DC at 107.5 MHz in Liverpool.

== History ==
=== Early years ===
The earliest Syracuse broadcasting stations, all of which were short-lived, were: WBAB (Andrew J. Potter, April 19, 1922—March 22, 1923); WDAI (Hughes Electrical Corporation, May 16, 1922 – November 19, 1923); WFAB (Carl Frank Woese, June 6, 1922 – October 9, 1924); and WLAH, first licensed in the summer of 1922 to Samuel Woodworth. It was deleted in the fall of 1924. A contemporary write-up of WFBL's debut referred to both WFAB and WLAH as low-powered "private stations", which "have now been dismantled", and contrasted them to WFBL, which it called "Syracuse's first professional station".

WFBL's first license was issued to the Onondaga Hotel, and dated November 20, 1924. The call letters were sequentially assigned, (Note: Other stations first licensed the same month as WFBL included WFBK, Hanover, New Hampshire; WFBM, Indianapolis, Indiana; WFBQ, Raleigh, North Carolina; and WFBR, Baltimore, Maryland.) and the station initially adopted the slogan "When Feeling Blue, Listen", based on the call sign. WFBL was described as the culmination of "many months" of cooperative effort between the Radio Dealers Association and the hotel. Studios were located on the 11th floor of the Onondaga, with an antenna constructed on the roof.

Samuel Woodworth was credited with having "shouldered the burden of mechanical installation and testing", and was WFBL's General Manager at the time of his death in 1954. Some of WLAH's equipment was transferred to be used by WFBL; consequently, station staff began to link WLAH's and WFBL's histories, resulting with the station's slogan later becoming the "First Broadcasting License" in central New York. However, government regulators have consistently considered WLAH and WFBL to be separate stations, and Federal Communications Commission records list WFBL's first license date as November 20, 1924.

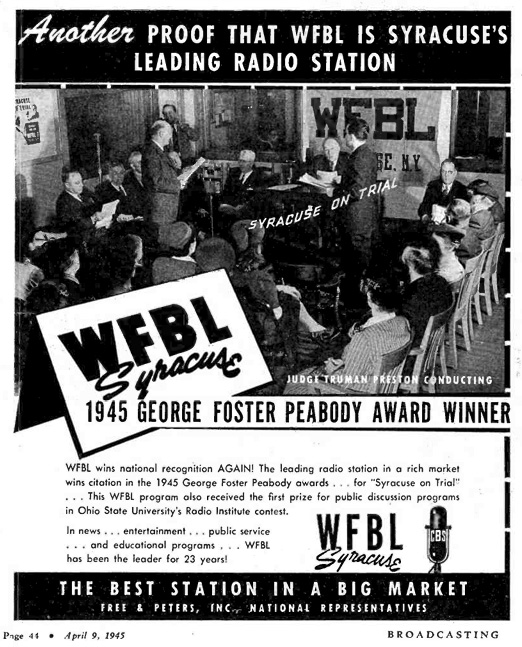
1945 station advertisement.

=== CBS Radio ===
WFBL was a charter member of the CBS Radio Network, being one of the 16 stations that aired the first CBS network program on September 18, 1927. (Note: The other stations were WOR (Newark); WADC (Akron); WAIU (Columbus); WCAO (Baltimore); WCAU (Philadelphia); WEAN (Providence); WGHP (Detroit); WJAS (Pittsburgh); WKRC (Cincinnati); WMAK (Buffalo-Lockport); WMAQ (Chicago); WNAC (Boston); WOWO (Fort Wayne); KMOX (Saint Louis); and KOIL (Council Bluffs).) In late 1932, controlling interest in the station was bought by Oscar and Robert Soule and Samuel H. Cook.

In 1945, an FM station was added, WFBL-FM. It largely simulcast the AM station. At first, WFBL-FM was heard on 45.9 MHz but a short time later it moved to 93.1 MHz. WFBL-AM-FM carried the line up of CBS dramas, comedies, news, sports, soap operas, game shows and big band broadcasts during the "Golden Age of Radio".

=== MOR, Hot Hits and Music of Your Life ===
As network programming moved from radio to television in the 1950s, WFBL switched to a full-service radio format of middle of the road music, news and sports.

From May 1979 to October 1980, WFBL, then known as "Fire 14," used consultant Mike Joseph's "Hot Hits" format as a Top 40 competitor to 1490 WOLF. The station dropped "Hot Hits" in October 1980 in favor of the then-emerging adult standards format called the "Music of Your Life". In the early 1990s, the station also broadcast local call-in sports talk programming in late night to supplement the music format. During that era, future ESPN and NBC sportscaster Mike Tirico (then a sports anchor at WTVH) was one of the station's sports talk personalities.

The WFBL call sign (and standards format) later moved to 1050 AM in Baldwinsville, New York, before returning to their original home at 1390. WFBL changed its call letters to WLLF on October 17, 1989, but returned to WFBL two weeks later. On September 21, 1993, it became WDCW, owned by Don Crawford as one of around two dozen AMs and FMs across the nation broadcasting Christian programing on the Crawford network. The 1390 kilohertz call letters returned once again to WFBL on December 1, 2003.

=== Talk and oldies ===
For a few years, when it was owned by Buckley Broadcasting, WFBL featured a line-up that closely mirrored its sister talk station, 710 WOR in New York City. This continued until April 7, 2008 at 6:00 a.m.

At that time, WFBL switched formats from "Talk Radio 1390" to "Oldies 1390". It featured hits from the 1950s and 1960s. However, on October 12, 2009, the oldies format moved to WSEN 1050 AM. With the move, WFBL returned to the talk radio format.

=== Station sale ===
In late 2015, Leatherstocking Media Group reached an agreement to sell some of its assets to the Family Life Network, a regional Christian radio company. The sale did not include WFBL. But it did give the network rights to share WFBL's transmitter and gave Family Life right of first refusal to purchase WFBL and match any bid for the station. Because Family Life owned no AM stations, and promptly traded away the other Syracuse station included in the deal to Craig Fox, such a sale was deemed unlikely.

On September 3, 2016, WFBL went silent due to insufficient funds to correct equipment problems. The station resumed broadcasting on August 7, 2017, with a 1950s and 60s Oldies format.

Craig Fox reached an agreement to purchase the station's license for Wolf Radio, Inc. from Leatherstocking for $275,000. While there were questions whether Fox, who was at the maximum number of allowable license holdings in the Syracuse market and had run into complications with the Family Life trades, would be allowed to consummate the sale, it was eventually consummated on August 22, 2017. After Fox bought the station, it began simulcasting the classic hits format heard on sister station WSEN.
