= WWDG =

WWDG may refer to:

- WWDG-CD, a low-power television station (channel 28, virtual 12) licensed to serve Utica, New York, United States; see List of television stations in New York (state)
- WCIS-FM, a radio station (105.1 FM) licensed to serve Deruyter, New York, which held the call sign WWDG from 2003 to 2009
