= WBVG =

Baldwinsville, New York; United States
- Broadcast area: Syracuse metropolitan area
- Frequency: 1050 kHz

Programming
- Format: Defunct

Ownership
- Owner: Leatherstocking Media Group, Inc.

History
- First air date: February 25, 1959
- Former call signs: WSEN (1959–1993); WFBL (1993–2003); WSEN (2003–2017)
- Call sign meaning: W BaldwinsVille G

Technical information
- Facility ID: 7712
- Class: D
- Power: 2,500 watts day 19 watts night
- Transmitter coordinates: 43°10′46″N 76°20′19″W

WBVG (1050 kHz) was an AM radio station licensed to Baldwinsville, New York serving the Syracuse metropolitan area. WBVG was last owned by Leatherstocking Media Group and aired a 1950s - 1960s oldies radio format. The transmitter was on Hencle Boulevard (Route 631) in Baldwinsville.

WBVG was powered at 2,500 watts by day. But because AM 1050 is a clear channel frequency, WBVG reduced power at night to only 19 watts to avoid interference. Outside of Baldwinsville, the 1050 frequency in Central New York at night is either occupied by WEPN New York City or CHUM Toronto, both 50,000 watt stations. They sometimes were heard over WBVG at night, even a mile or two from its transmitter.

== History ==
On February 25, 1959, the station first signed on as WSEN and was licensed by Century Radio Corp. Owners Robert Stockdale, Donald Menapace, and James Lowery started WSEN as a middle of the road and adult standards station, but changed to country music in 1962 and called it "The first country station north of the Mason–Dixon line." On-air personalities Early Williams and Fred Lewis played the current country hits and announced with a western "twang", unique to central New York at that time. In 1967, sister station 92.1 WSEN-FM (now WOLF-FM) began operations, simulcasting the same country music, allowing listeners with FM receivers to hear the format around the clock.

Century Radio sold the stations in 1974 to Sentry Radio, led by principal owners Roger O'Connor, Robert Orenbach, and manager Shirley Zakrazek, one of the early female station managers. A more "modern country" approach was taken which resulted in a younger audience and larger sales dollars. In 1977, "Downes, Merchant and Company", a two man team of Ted Downes and Bill Merchant, took over the morning show along with a cast of characters. Other on-air talent included Dick Kuklinski, Bob Mason, Ed McKee, and Al Jenner, with Dave Kramer and Pete McKay on production. In 1979, chief engineer Richard Kane donated $1500 in a stock purchase so the station could go to stereo. It was led by new Program Director Daniel Dunn, who attained record audience ratings for the station and its, by then, "progressive country" format, with artists such as Willie Nelson, Jerry Jeff Walker and Waylon Jennings.

WSEN-AM-FM flipped to an oldies format in 1986.

=== 2000s ===
WSEN was owned by Buckley Broadcasting, simulcasting the oldies format on both the AM and FM, during much of the early 2000s until being sold in 2008.

=== 2010s ===
WSEN 1050 split from simulcasting WSEN-FM in 2011. This came as part of a national trend for oldies outlets transitioning to classic hits. At the time, WSEN/WSEN-FM was airing 1960s and 1970s music. As part of the split, WSEN became a "true oldies" outlet focusing on the 1960s, while WSEN-FM shifted to classic hits of the 1970s and added 1980s music to its playlist.

In 2016, Leatherstocking Media Group sold WSEN-FM 92.1 FM (now WOLF-FM) to the Family Life Network, which in turn sold it to Craig L. Fox. When the call letters of WSEN-FM were changed to WOLF-FM, Fox changed the call letters of one of his stations, WNDR-FM 103.9 FM, to WSEN-FM. He insisted that Leatherstocking Media Group change the call letters of WSEN to avoid confusion with his FM station.

On September 18, 2016, WSEN went silent for technical reasons. The station resumed broadcasting on July 10, 2017, with a 1950s and 1960s Oldies format. The call letters of the station were changed to WBVG on August 14, 2017, one day before the station went silent again on August 15, 2017. WBVG signed back onto the air on July 23, 2018, to go off the air again soon afterwards. In the summer of 2019, WBVG signed on once again with the commercial-free 1950s and 1960s Oldies format.

=== 2020s ===
WBVG's license was deleted on June 2, 2022, after being silent for two years, as owners Leatherstocking Media Group failed to file a license renewal application for the station.
