= WVOA (AM) =

Christian radio station in East Syracuse, New York

- East Syracuse, New York; United States
- Broadcast area: Syracuse metropolitan area
- Frequency: 1540 kHz

Programming
- Format: Christian radio
- Affiliations: Salem Radio Network

Ownership
- Owner: Craig Fox; (Cram Communications LLC)
- Sister stations: WFBL; WMBO; WMVN; WOLF; WOLF-FM; WOSW; WQSE-LD; WSEN

History
- First air date: December 6, 1965
- Former call signs: WPAW (1965–1974); WYRD (1974–1981); WSIV (1981–2025)
- Call sign meaning: Former call sign of WCIS-FM, WSEN, and WQSE-LD, The Voice of the Arts

Technical information
- Licensing authority: FCC
- Facility ID: 22133
- Class: D
- Power: 1,000 watts day; 57 watts night
- Transmitter coordinates: 43°5′40″N 76°2′0″W (day); 43°1′22″N 76°9′34″W (night)
- Translator: 106.3 W292EY (Syracuse)

Links
- Public license information: Public file; LMS
- Webcast: Listen live
- Website: www.wvoaradio.com

WVOA (1540 AM) is a radio station broadcasting a Christian radio format. Licensed to East Syracuse, New York, United States, the station serves the Syracuse metropolitan area. The station is owned by Cram Communications LLC, a company majority-owned by Craig Fox. WVOA also transmits programming via 106.3 FM translator W292EY.

According to the Federal Communications Commission database, the station's nighttime tower is 10 meters (33 ft) tall (18 degrees at 1540 kHz) making it the shortest broadcast AM tower in the United States.

== History ==
The Wide Water Broadcasting Company received a construction permit to build a new radio station on 1540 kHz in East Syracuse on May 12, 1965. The company, consisting of local residents, built studios in the former Canada Dry Building on Erie Boulevard, Broadcasts began on December 6, 1965, with a full-service format. The station would adopt a full-time country music format in 1967.

Bruce A. Houston bought WPAW in 1969, but his future in Syracuse broadcasting would be frustrated when his bid to buy classical-formatted WONO-FM (now WWHT) was successfully blocked by a citizen's group. In 1973, he tried selling the station to Mars Hill Broadcasting Co., owner of Christian radio station WMHR, but the sale was dismissed months after it was proposed. WPAW was instead sold to Richard T. Crawford the next year, but the result was the same: WPAW took on a Christian format and adopted the callsign WYRD, going by "The Word". Crawford also relocated the transmitter to a site at Fremont and Myers roads in Syracuse, adjacent to the New York State Thruway. Surof Communications, a subsidiary of Forus Communications, purchased WYRD in 1979.

The call letters were changed to WSIV in 1981, after Forus acquired the FM station in DeRuyter, WOIV (105.1 FM), which had been owned by the Christian Broadcasting Network along with a string of other stations that had been previously owned by (and named for) the Ivy Broadcasting Company. WSIV and WOIV began simulcasting on November 2, 1981. The simulcast ended in January 1989, when low ratings prompted Forus to flip WOIV to classical music as WVOA; WSIV continued with its religious programs.

Cram Communications, a company owned by Craig Fox, bought WSIV and WVOA in 1996 for $900,000. WVOA would become WCIS-FM later in its life.

On July 13, 2021, WSIV began carrying the programming previously heard on sister station WVOA-LP (87.7 FM). On May 12, 2025, WSIV changed its call sign to WVOA, concurrent with WVOA-LD becoming WQSE-LD.
