= WOLF (AM) =

- Syracuse, New York; United States
- Broadcast area: Syracuse metropolitan area
- Frequency: 1490 kHz
- Branding: Fox Sports 1490

Programming
- Language: English
- Format: Sports radio
- Affiliations: Fox Sports Radio

Ownership
- Owner: Craig Fox (91.1%); (WOLF Radio, Inc.)
- Sister stations: WFBL; WMBO; WMVN; WOLF-FM; WOSW; WQSE-LD; WSEN; WVOA

History
- First air date: May 5, 1940
- Former call signs: WOLF (1940–1984); WAQX (1984–1988); WNYR (1988–1989); WNNR (1989)
- Call sign meaning: Wolf

Technical information
- Licensing authority: FCC
- Facility ID: 73380
- Class: C
- Power: 1,000 watts unlimited
- Transmitter coordinates: 43°3′30.24″N 76°9′58.73″W
- Translator: 92.5 W223CP (Syracuse)

Links
- Public license information: Public file; LMS
- Webcast: Listen live
- Website: foxsports1490.com

WOLF (1490 kHz) is a commercial sports radio formatted broadcast AM radio station licensed to Syracuse, New York, serving the Syracuse metropolitan area. The station is owned by Craig Fox, who also owns several other radio and low-power TV stations in the state of New York. The WOLF broadcast license is held by WOLF Radio, Inc. The station is also simulcast on FM translator W223CP at 92.5 FM, on the FM6 service of WVOA-LD at 87.75 FM, and in Fulton, New York, on WOSW 1300 AM and its FM translator, W253BZ at 98.5 FM.

== History ==
WOLF first signed on in Syracuse shortly after the start of World War II. Like all local-channel AMs, it was initially limited to only 250 watts of power. During the early 1960s it was permitted to raise daytime power to 1,000 watts, and increased night power to 1,000 watts a decade later along with nearly all other local-channel (Class C) AM stations in the United States. It long programmed a personality popular music format, and for many years was highly competitive within its signal area with stronger regional (Class B) signals from similarly formatted stations including WNDR and WFBL, although it was unable to achieve full metropolitan coverage especially after sunset. In 1984, WOLF began broadcasting in AM stereo using the Kahn-Hazeltine independent sideband system. In the 1990s, WOLF stopped broadcasting in AM stereo.

Past radio personalities at WOLF include:

- Dick Clark
- Jim Sims
- Fred Winston (Chicago)
- Bud Ballou and Dale Dorman (Buffalo, Boston)
- Marv Albert and Don Bombard (New York City)
- Wendell "Windy" Craig (CBS Evening News)

The call sign was changed to WAQX in 1984. It became WNYR on October 4, 1988; WNNR on April 1, 1989; and returned to WOLF on October 23, 1989.

On May 3, 1999, WOLF (alongside WOLF-FM and WKGJ) became the Radio Disney affiliates in the Syracuse metropolitan area, and the station switched back using the AM stereo system, this time with a Motorola system. Two weeks later, WOLF stopped broadcasting in AM stereo again. In June 2001, WBGJ started the simulcast of WOLF. On November 25, 2006, WAMF also started the simulcast of WOLF as result of the sale of the station to Craig Fox; although in October, the WAMF callsign was heard in the ID of Radio Disney stations in Syracuse.

In December 2006, the FM stations split off and flipped to the MOViN format. In September 2012, WAMF (now WOSW) dropped Radio Disney and flipped to Country.

In December 2013, WMBO dropped the WOLF simulcast and flipped to all-Beatles programming. On February 1, 2014, Radio Disney (as part of its phaseout of terrestrial broadcasting) canceled its affiliation with WOLF. WOLF was the last Radio Disney station not owned by the ABC, Inc. subsidiary of The Walt Disney Company. This resulted in the station going off-the-air as it transitioned to a new format, originally slated according to FCC filings to happen in August 2014.

At the time, a construction permit was filed for a new FM translator at 93.9 FM by Pathway Community Radio, Inc. to simulcast WOLF. However, this was never completed.

WOLF was still silent in January 2015. As a result, the station temporarily signed on with a simulcast of WNDR-FM to keep the station's license active.

On July 20, 2015, the station flipped to sports as the Fox Sports Radio affiliate on the area. The station broadcasts the national network lineup. Fox Sports Radio had previously been heard in the area on network owned-and-operated WHEN until late 2010.

In May 2017, the station began simulcasting on FM translator W223CP at 92.5 FM.

On December 18, 2023, the station began simulcasting at 87.75 MHz as an ancillary or supplementary analog service of WVOA-LD, one of only fourteen such FM6 stations licensed in the United States. On May 28, 2026, the station dropped the Fox Sports Radio WOLF (AM) simulcast and flipped to classic hits as The Spot 87.7, which focuses on music from the 1990s and early 2000s.

== Translator ==
Call sign	Frequency	City of license	FID	ERP (W)	Class	Transmitter coordinates	FCC info
W223CP	92.5 FM	Syracuse, New York	13910	250	D	43°3′30.2″N 76°9′58.7″W	LMS
