= WOLF-FM =

- Baldwinsville, New York; United States
- Broadcast area: Syracuse, New York
- Frequency: 92.1 MHz (HD Radio)
- Branding: 92.1 The Wolf

Programming
- Format: Country
- Subchannels: HD2: WSEN simulcast; HD3: WMVN simulcast
- Affiliations: Compass Media Networks; Westwood One

Ownership
- Owner: Craig Fox and Sam Furco; (FoxFur Communications, LLC)
- Sister stations: WFBL; WMBO; WMVN; WOLF; WOSW; WQSE-LD; WSEN; WVOA

History
- First air date: 1967 (as WSEN-FM)
- Former call signs: WSEN-FM (1967–2016); WNDR (4/6/2016-4/14/2016)
- Call sign meaning: "The Wolf" (station branding)

Technical information
- Licensing authority: FCC
- Facility ID: 7716
- Class: B1
- ERP: 25,000 watts
- HAAT: 91 meters (299 ft)
- Transmitter coordinates: 43°10′46″N 76°20′19″W
- Translator: See § Repeaters and translators
- Repeater: See § Repeaters and translators

Links
- Public license information: Public file; LMS
- Webcast: Listen live
- Website: www.921fmthewolf.com

WOLF-FM (92.1 MHz) is a radio station licensed to Baldwinsville, New York, serving the Syracuse metropolitan area. The station is owned by Craig Fox and Sam Furco, through licensee FoxFur Communications, LLC, and broadcasts a country music format branded as 92.1 The Wolf.

== History ==
In 1967, the station began operations as a full-time country outlet as WSEN-FM. It was the sister station to WSEN (1050 AM), one of the first country stations in the northeastern United States. Century Radio sold the stations in 1974. On September 7, 1975, WSEN-FM began operating on a 24-hour basis continuing with a country music format.

In 1986, the station format flipped to oldies. Both AM and FM were owned by Buckley Broadcasting during much of the 2000s, until being sold in 2008 to Leatherstocking Media Group.

In 2011, as the oldies format drifted into classic hits, WSEN (at the time playing a 1960s/1970s mix of songs) split its simulcast: the FM side switched to a modern-leaning classic hits format centered on the 1970s and 1980s, while the AM side went for a "real oldies" approach featuring 1950s and 1960s music.

=== Acquisition by Family Life and trade with Craig Fox ===
In late 2015, the station was sold to the Family Life Network, a regional religious broadcaster, along with WMCR-FM and rights to WFBL. WSEN-FM's intellectual property (including all on-air programming and staff contracts, but not the rights to the WSEN call sign) was sold to Galaxy Communications, who merged it with that of WZUN (which Galaxy reacquired in February 2016).

Family Life Network then promptly traded the 92.1 license to Craig Fox in exchange for the former WOLF-FM (105.1) in DeRuyter and WWLF-FM (96.7) in Oswego. WOLF's country music format was installed on 92.1 on March 29 at 5:00 p.m. The WSEN-FM call letters were swapped with Fox's WNDR-FM on April 6, 2016. The station adopted the WOLF-FM call sign on April 14, 2016.

On June 15, 2016, the Federal Communications Commission (FCC) denied the trade and fined FoxFur and Wolf Radio $20,000 for violating the multiple ownership rule (because the companies' owner Craig Fox illegally operated eight licenses, where ownership limits in the market are seven).

In late June 2016, FoxFur filed a second request for the transfer of 105.1 and 96.7 to Family Life. However, because of the FCC's ruling, FoxFur ceased operation of WOLF-FM. As a result, Fox temporarily installed the country music format on his station WOSW. The station's previous owner, Family Life, then simulcast WOSW on 92.1 until the transfer was finalized. At the time, WOLF-FM was the only station in FLN's portfolio running secular programming.

The transaction was approved in September 2016 and the consummation occurred simultaneously with FoxFur's purchase of WFBL on August 21, 2017, in order to keep Fox under the ownership limits in the market. The transfer of translator W252AC to Family Life and translator W207BH to FoxFur affiliate Wolf Radio, Inc. was also included in the final deal.

Shortly after the consummation in late 2017, WOLF-FM began HD radio broadcasts. It also began simulcasting sister stations WSEN and WMVN on its HD2 and HD3 subchannels, respectively.

== Repeaters and translators ==
Broadcast translators for WOLF-FM
Call sign	Frequency	City of license	FID	ERP (W)	Class	Transmitter coordinates	FCC info	Notes
W231CS	94.1 FM	Elmwood, New York	155848	235	D	43°03′30.20″N 76°09′58.70″W	LMS	Relays HD2
W255DC	98.9 FM	Fulton, New York	86708	210	D	43°17′41″N 76°26′35″W	LMS	Relays HD3
W259DJ	99.7 FM	Volney, New York	93092	190	D	43°17′41.0″N 76°26′34.0″W	LMS	Relays HD3

Call sign	Frequency	City of license	Facility ID	ERP W	Height m (ft)	Class	Transmitter coordinates
WMVN (FM) HD3	100.3 FM (HD)	Sylvan Beach, New York	85534	6,000	100 m (330 ft)	A	43°14′46.2″N 75°46′23.7″W

Broadcast translator for WMVN (FM) HD3
Call sign	Frequency	City of license	FID	ERP (W)	Class	Transmitter coordinates	FCC info
W268AE	101.5 FM	Wampsville, New York	87504	75	D	43°03′57″N 75°40′05″W	LMS
