= WMVN (FM) =

Coordinates: 43.2462°N 75.7732°W

- Sylvan Beach, New York; United States
- Broadcast area: Syracuse metropolitan area–Utica–Rome metropolitan area
- Frequency: 100.3 MHz (HD Radio)
- Branding: 96.5/100.3 The Beat

Programming
- Format: Rhythmic top 40
- Subchannels: HD2: Simulcast of WSEN; HD3: Simulcast of WOLF-FM
- Affiliations: Premiere Networks

Ownership
- Owner: Craig Fox; (WOLF Radio, Inc.)
- Sister stations: WFBL; WMBO; WOLF; WOLF-FM; WOSW; WQSE-LD; WSEN; WVOA

History
- First air date: June 2001
- Former call signs: WBGJ (1998–2006); WWLF-FM (2006–2009); WMVU (9/2009–12/2009)
- Call sign meaning: Movin (previous format)

Technical information
- Licensing authority: FCC
- Facility ID: 85534
- Class: A
- ERP: 6,000 watts
- HAAT: 100 meters (330 ft)
- Translator: WOLF-FM HD3: 96.5 W243AB (Westvale)
- Repeater: 92.1 WOLF-FM HD3 (Baldwinsville)

Links
- Public license information: Public file; LMS
- Webcast: Listen live
- Website: 965thebeat.com

WMVN (100.3 MHz, "96.5/100.3 The Beat") is a rhythmic top 40 FM radio station serving the Syracuse and a part of the Utica–Rome market. WMVN is licensed to Sylvan Beach, New York. A separate translator W243AB, serves the city of Westvale, New York, on the 96.5 frequency (hence the "96.5/100.3 The Beat" branding). The station's studios are located on West Kirkpatrick Street in Syracuse.

== History ==
=== As Radio Disney ===
WMVN signed on in June 2001 as WBGJ, a simulcast of the Radio Disney affiliated sister stations WOLF and WWLF.

=== As "Movin'" ===
In October 2006, the station changed its call sign to WWLF-FM. On December 6, 2006, the station flipped its format to rhythmic adult contemporary, becoming the tenth station to adopt the MOViN' format, along with sister station WOLF-FM 96.7. The AM stations continued to carry Radio Disney programming through 2014.

In August 2009, WWLF-FM and WOLF-FM changed their call signs to WMVU and WMVN. This allowed sister station FM 105.1 to adopt the WOLF-FM call letters, as it transitioned to a country music format known as "The Wolf". The WMVN call sign had been available since January 2009, when the current WXOS in St. Louis, Missouri, abandoned the Movin' format and thus the call sign.

On November 30, 2009, WMVU and WMVN split their simulcast, with 96.7 flipping to country, simulcasting WOLF-FM with new calls WWLF-FM. The WMVN call sign was concurrently moved to 100.3.

=== As "The Beat" ===
On November 9, 2016, WMVN began stunting with the sound of a heartbeat and liners promoting a change at 4 p.m. on that date. At that time, WMVN flipped to rhythmic CHR as "96.5/100.3 The Beat". The first song on "The Beat" was "No Problem" by Chance the Rapper.

In late 2017, WMVN began HD radio broadcasts. It also began simulcasting sister stations WSEN and WOLF-FM on its HD2 and HD3 subchannels, respectively.
