= WCIS-FM =

- DeRuyter, New York; United States
- Broadcast area: Central New York
- Frequency: 105.1 MHz (HD Radio)
- Branding: Family Life Network

Programming
- Format: Contemporary Christian
- Network: Family Life Network

Ownership
- Owner: Family Life Network; (Family Life Ministries, Inc.)

History
- First air date: June 6, 1948 (as WVCN)
- Former call signs: WVCN (1948–1954); WRRD (1954–1961); WOIV (1961–1989); WVOA (1989–2001); WVOQ (2001); WXBB (2001–2003); WWDG (2003–2009); WVOA-FM (2009); WOLF-FM (2009–2016)
- Call sign meaning: "Where Christ is Savior"

Technical information
- Licensing authority: FCC
- Facility ID: 22134
- Class: B
- ERP: 33,000 watts
- HAAT: 185 meters (607 ft)
- Transmitter coordinates: 42.783°N 75.841°W
- Translator: 98.3 W252AC (Syracuse)

Links
- Public license information: Public file; LMS
- Website: www.familylife.org/radio/

Simulcast
- WCIO
- Oswego, New York; United States
- Frequency: 96.7 MHz

History
- First air date: July 1990
- Former call signs: WPZX (1988–1989); WZOS (1989–1997); WOLF-FM (1997–2009); WMVN (2009); WMVU (2009); WWLF-FM (2009–2016)
- Call sign meaning: "Where Christ is Over All"

Technical information
- Facility ID: 5344
- Class: A
- ERP: 3,400 watts
- HAAT: 86 meters (282 ft)
- Transmitter coordinates: 43°29′12″N 76°23′10″W

Links
- Public license information: Public file; LMS

WCIS-FM (105.1 MHz) is a contemporary Christian radio station serving the Central New York Region. The station broadcasts with an ERP of 33 kW and is licensed to DeRuyter, New York; it is owned and operated by the Family Life Network, a regional Christian broadcaster active in upstate New York and Northern Pennsylvania. Family Life also owns WCIO (96.7 FM) in Oswego.

== History ==
=== WVCN ===
The 105.1 MHz facility in DeRuyter began operating June 6, 1948, as WVCN, the Central New York outlet of the farm-oriented Rural Radio Network, a six-station group based in Ithaca. This pioneer FM network was the first to employ a direct off-air relay system instead of wire lines, with WVCN serving as the link between Ithaca flagship station WVFC and sister stations WVBN, Turin (which would cease operation in 1951) and WVCV, Cherry Valley. Its original General Electric 250 watt transmitter and four-section RCA FM Pylon antenna provided an ERP of 1.3 kW, horizontally-polarized. A 1 kW amplifier was added in April 1951, increasing ERP to 5.3 kW, however this proved insufficient to cover the entire city of Syracuse with a predicted 1 mV/m (60 dBμ) signal.

=== WRRD/WOIV ===
On January 1, 1954, the DeRuyter station's callsign was changed to WRRD. After affiliating with New York City's WQXR, the group's programming began to shift toward classical music and a new identity as the "Northeast Radio Network" was introduced. In January 1961, ownership of the DeRuyter facility and its four sister stations was transferred to the Ivy Broadcasting Company, Inc., prompting a callsign change to WOIV. Five years later, the network changed hands again, this time to the Chenango & Unadilla (C&U) Telephone Company, which added a second 1 kW transmitter and a Collins/ERI model 300-5 dipole antenna to provide 4.9 kW in the vertical polarization. A 1968 merger with Continental Telephone forced divestiture of C&U's broadcast properties, and the entire group of five FM stations, then valued at $600,000, was donated to the Christian Broadcasting Network (CBN), headed by Pat Robertson.

=== WVOA/WXBB/The Dog/Nova 105.1 ===
CBN raised funds to replace aging transmitter equipment and eliminated the off-air relay system in favor of a stereo 950 MHz link from the main studio in Ithaca. In September 1972, an RCA BTF-10E1 transmitter and BFC-10 circularly-polarized antenna were installed, increasing the ERP to 42 kW and greatly improving coverage in Syracuse. In October 1981, CBN sold WOIV to Forus Communications for $242,500, and in 1989, the call sign was changed again to WVOA. Cram Communications, headed by Syracuse broadcast entrepreneur Craig Fox, operated the station under a religious format from 1994 to 2001, then sold it for $5 million to Clear Channel, which converted it to a simulcast of WBBS with the calls WXBB. After one year, it flipped to active rock as WWDG, "The Dog", in 2002, but after four years of struggling ratings, it flipped to "Nova 105.1", with a hot adult contemporary format, in July 2006. Clear Channel would later place the station in the Aloha Station Trust in 2008 due to the company's privatization plans.

=== Sale back to Craig Fox ===
On March 6, 2009, Craig Fox purchased the station back from Aloha, for $1.25 million; the license would be transferred to FoxFur Communications, owned by Fox and partner Samuel J. Furco. The deal closed two months later, after which Fox and Furco temporarily took the station off the air. FoxFur Communications restored the former WVOA call letters and brought the station back on the air on May 19, 2009, as WVOA-FM, and aired religious programming, simulcasting WVOU.

On August 14, 2009, WVOA-FM began stunting. The station started off simulcasting Radio Disney affiliate WOLF (1490 AM).

=== Wolf 105-1 ===
After just two weeks with the Radio Disney format, the station then began stunting with a loop of "Hungry Like the Wolf" by Duran Duran and then an all glam metal band format, before officially flipping at 4 p.m. on August 28, 2009, with a country music format, branded as "Wolf 105-1". The call sign would change to WOLF-FM.

=== Trade with Family Life Network ===
In March 2016, as part of a multiple-station swap, the FM 105.1 license (along with 96.7) was traded to the Family Life Network in exchange for the FM 92.1 license in Baldwinsville (then WSEN-FM). WOLF-FM's intellectual property would move to 92.1, which provides a stronger signal over Syracuse proper. When the change was complete, 105.1 and 96.7 would call signs (to WCIS-FM and WCIO respectively) and adopt FLN's Christian radio format. However, on June 15, the Federal Communications Commission denied the trade and fined FoxFur and Wolf Radio $20,000 for violating the multiple ownership rule (because companies' owner Craig Fox illegally operated eight licenses, where ownership limits in the market are seven). The sale was reconfigured and approved by the FCC in September 2016, also reducing the fine to $16,000 in recognition of Fox's prompt correction of the error; the consummation of the sale occurred on August 21, 2017.

== Repeaters and translators ==
Since 2009, the programming of 105.1 FM has been simulcast on WCIO (96.7 FM) in Oswego, New York. This station went on the air in July 1990 as WZOS. Its original owner, OSQ Broadcasting (controlled by John C. Clancy, then-owner of WATN and WTOJ in Watertown and WCDO AM–FM in Sidney), sold the station to Binder-Johnson Broadcasting for $234,000 in 1992. As WZOS, the station had an adult contemporary format as "Z96".

WZOS was silent by November 1996, and was sold in a bankruptcy auction to Craig Fox for $65,000 the following year. Fox brought WZOS back on the air in August 1997 as a simulcast of his talk radio station in Syracuse, WOLF (1490 AM), and changed the call sign to WOLF-FM on September 5. The WOLF stations, along with WKGJ in Auburn, replaced talk with Radio Disney on May 3, 1999.

WOLF-FM, along with WWLF-FM (100.3) in Sylvan Beach, broke from the WOLF simulcast on December 7, 2006, and launched a rhythmic adult contemporary format under the "Movin'" brand. The call sign was changed to WMVN in 2009, freeing the WOLF-FM call sign for use on 105.1; on November 30, 96.7 would switch to simulcasting 105.1's country format under the WWLF-FM call sign. The 100.3 facility, which had earlier changed from WWLF-FM to WMVU, retained the "Movin'" programming and took on the WMVN call sign.

Broadcast translator for WCIS-FM
| Call sign | Frequency | City of license | FID | ERP (W) | Class | Transmitter coordinates | FCC info |
|---|---|---|---|---|---|---|---|
| W252AC | 98.3 FM | Syracuse, New York | 25016 | 250 | D | 42°58′1″N 76°12′0″W | LMS |
