= WQSE-LD =

Television station in Syracuse, New York

ATSC 3.0 station
- Syracuse, New York; United States
- Channels: Digital: 6 (VHF); Virtual: 6

Programming
- Affiliations: 6.1: Infomercials

Ownership
- Owner: Craig Fox; (Metro TV, Inc.)
- Operator: Inner Harbor Media
- Sister stations: WFBL; WMBO; WMVN; WOLF; WOLF-FM; WOSW; WSEN; WVOA

History
- Founded: June 30, 1992
- Former call signs: W60BY (1992–1998); WMBO-LP (1998–2013); WVOA-LP (2013–2022); WVOA-LD (2022–2025)
- Former channel numbers: Analog: 60 (UHF, 1997–2009), 6 (VHF, 2009–2022)
- Former affiliations: NASA TV; The Fish (Salem); Dark (2021–2022)
- Call sign meaning: From "'Cuse", a colloquial contraction of the name Syracuse

Technical information
- Licensing authority: FCC
- Facility ID: 14319
- Class: LD
- ERP: 2.75 kW
- HAAT: 54.1 m (177 ft)
- Transmitter coordinates: 43°3′30″N 76°9′59″W

Links
- Public license information: Public file; LMS

Radio station information
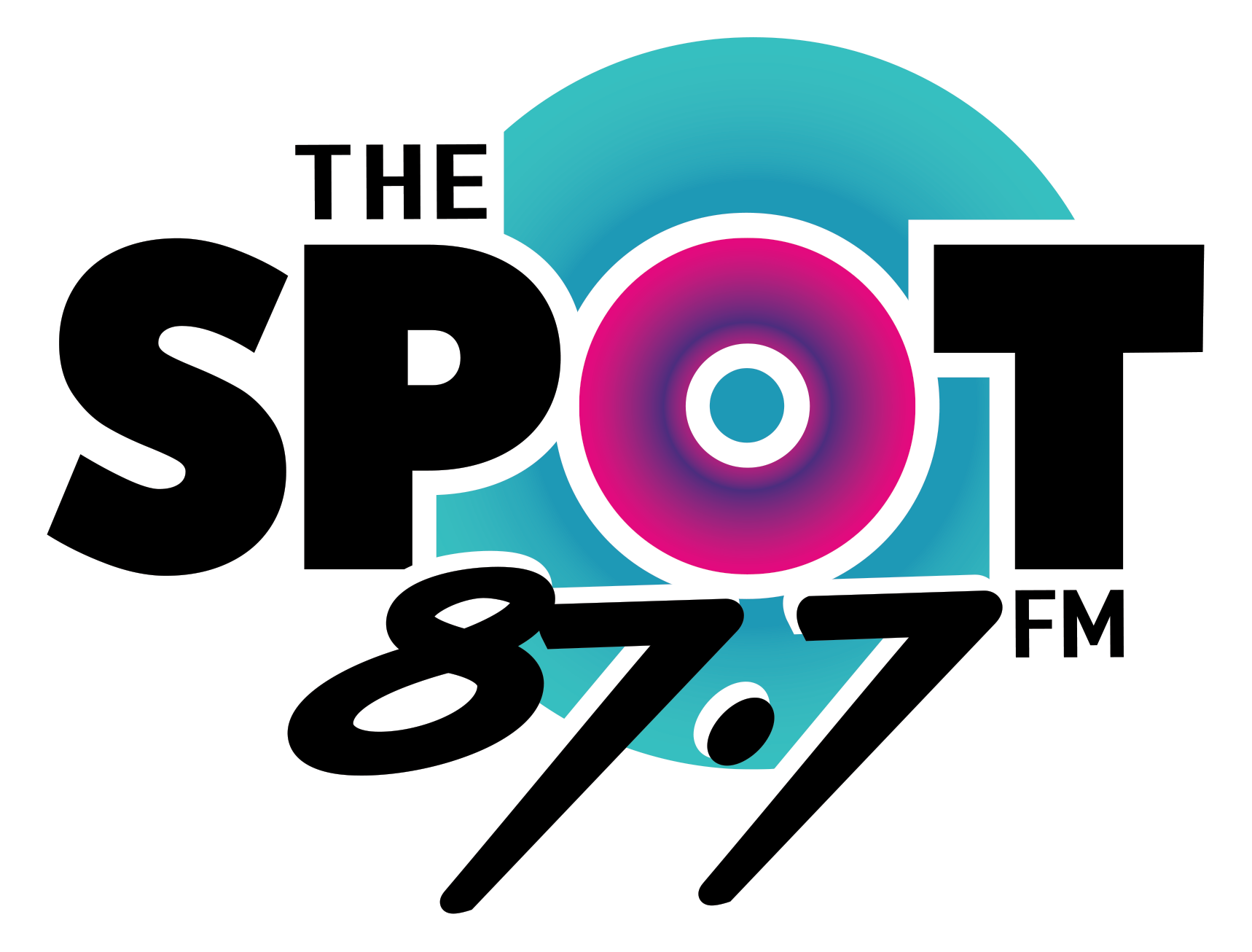
- Frequency: 87.7 MHz
- Branding: The Spot 87.7

Programming
- Format: Classic hits

Links
- Website: 877thespot.com

WQSE-LD (channel 6) is a low-power television station in Syracuse, New York, United States. The station is owned by Metro TV, Inc., one of the numerous holding companies owned or co-owned by Craig Fox. WQSE-LD's transmitter is located on the WOLF radio tower on West Kirkpatrick Street northwest of downtown Syracuse.

Until July 13, 2021, the station—then known as WVOA-LP—operated a brokered religious format known as "Love Radio"; "Love Radio" had previously aired in the Syracuse area on 103.9 FM, now known as WSEN. WVOA-LP operated on analog channel 6, allowing its audio feed to be heard on the FM radio dial at 87.75 MHz. To meet the legal requirements for visual content, the station ran the display from an Atari Video Music machine that the station's audio signal was fed into.

Prior to adopting that format in October 2013, the then-WMBO-LP carried a feed of NASA TV, which it had carried since returning to the air in November 2010.

WVOA-LP's programming consisted mostly of brokered religious programming from around the United States, with Salem Radio Network's "The Fish" network filling in unsold gaps. A few secular music programs also aired, primarily on weekends.

As part of the Federal Communications Commission (FCC)'s mandated shutdown on low-power analog television stations, the station ended all analog transmissions on July 13, 2021, at 5 p.m. All programs were moved to sister station WSIV. The station was licensed to begin digital TV operations effective January 11, 2022, changing its call sign to WVOA-LD.

On July 20, 2023, a FCC "Report and Order" stated that WVOA-LD would be permitted to apply to resume separate audio operations on 87.75 MHz, using a modified version of the ATSC 3.0 "NextGen TV" standard. It converted to ATSC 3.0 operation on December 15, 2023, and began offering FM6 service under special temporary authority three days later, becoming the 14th and final permitted FM6 station, with the station simulcasting the programming of WOLF at 87.75 MHz as an ancillary or supplementary analog service of WVOA-LD.

On May 2, 2025, the FCC authorized a call sign change to WQSE-LD, effective May 12, which cleared the former WSIV to adopt the WVOA calls. On May 28, 2026, the station flipped to classic hits as The Spot 87.7, which focuses on music from the 1990s and early 2000s.

== Subchannel ==
Subchannel of WQSE-LD (ATSC 3.0)
| Subchannel | Res. | Short name | Programming |
|---|---|---|---|
| 6.1 | 1080p | WQSE-LD | Infomercials |
