= WMBO (AM) =

Simulcasting WSEN Mexico, New York
- Auburn, New York; United States
- Broadcast area: Finger Lakes; Syracuse metropolitan area
- Frequency: 1340 kHz
- Branding: The Dinosaur

Programming
- Format: Classic hits
- Affiliations: Compass Media Networks; Westwood One

Ownership
- Owner: Craig Fox (91%); (WOLF Radio Inc.)
- Sister stations: WFBL; WMVN; WOLF; WOLF-FM; WOSW; WQSE-LD; WSEN; WVOA

History
- First air date: March 23, 1927 (at 1310)
- Former call signs: WMBO (1927–1998); WKGJ (1998–2000); WWLF (2000–2013); WMBO (2013–2016); WNDR (2016–2017)
- Former frequencies: 1310 kHz (1927–1941)

Technical information
- Licensing authority: FCC
- Facility ID: 25001
- Class: C
- Power: 1,000 watts unlimited
- Transmitter coordinates: 42.9514°N 76.5856°W (single tower)
- Translator: 106.1 W291CV (Auburn)

Links
- Public license information: Public file; LMS
- Webcast: Listen live
- Website: www.dinofm.com

WMBO (1340 kHz) is an AM radio station licensed to Auburn, New York, United States. The station serves the western Syracuse metropolitan area. The station is 51% owned by Craig Fox, who also owns several other radio and low-power TV stations in the state of New York. WMBO serves as a simulcast of WSEN (103.9 FM), and is relayed on FM translator W291CV (106.1).

== History ==
WMBO signed on in 1927, initially broadcasting at 1310 AM.

As a result of the North American Regional Broadcasting Agreement, in 1941 the station was reallocated to its current frequency. It was during this time that famed disc jockey Dick Biondi had his first on-air radio experience, reading a radio advertisement for WMBO as a child at some point in the early 1940s.

In 1998, the call sign changed to WKGJ. On May 3, 1999, WKGJ (alongside WOLF and WOLF-FM) became the Radio Disney affiliates in the Syracuse metropolitan area. The station later changed its call sign to WWLF in 2000.

In December 2013, WMBO dropped the WOLF simulcast and flipped to all-Beatles programming. The all-Beatles stunt, branded as WBTL, remained on the station for the first few months of 2014, before being replaced by a simulcast of the "Dinosaur Radio" classic hits format originating from sister station WNDR (now WSEN).

== Translator ==
Call sign	Frequency	City of license	FID	ERP (W)	Class	Transmitter coordinates	FCC info
W291CV	106.1 FM	Auburn, New York	147996	210	D	42°57′5.2″N 76°35′3.8″W	LMS
