= WJIV =

- Cherry Valley, New York; United States
- Broadcast area: Mohawk Valley
- Frequency: 101.9 MHz
- Branding: Victory 101.9

Programming
- Format: Christian radio

Ownership
- Owner: Christian Broadcasting System, Ltd.

History
- First air date: June 7, 1948
- Former call signs: WVCV (1948–1953); WRRC (1953–1960)
- Call sign meaning: "Ivy Broadcasting" (former owner)

Technical information
- Licensing authority: FCC
- Facility ID: 73138
- Class: B
- ERP: 11,500 watts
- HAAT: 312 meters (1,024 ft)
- Transmitter coordinates: 42°47′36″N 74°41′41″W
- Repeater: 107.7 WGNA-FM-HD2 (Albany)

Links
- Public license information: Public file; LMS
- Website: wjivradio.com

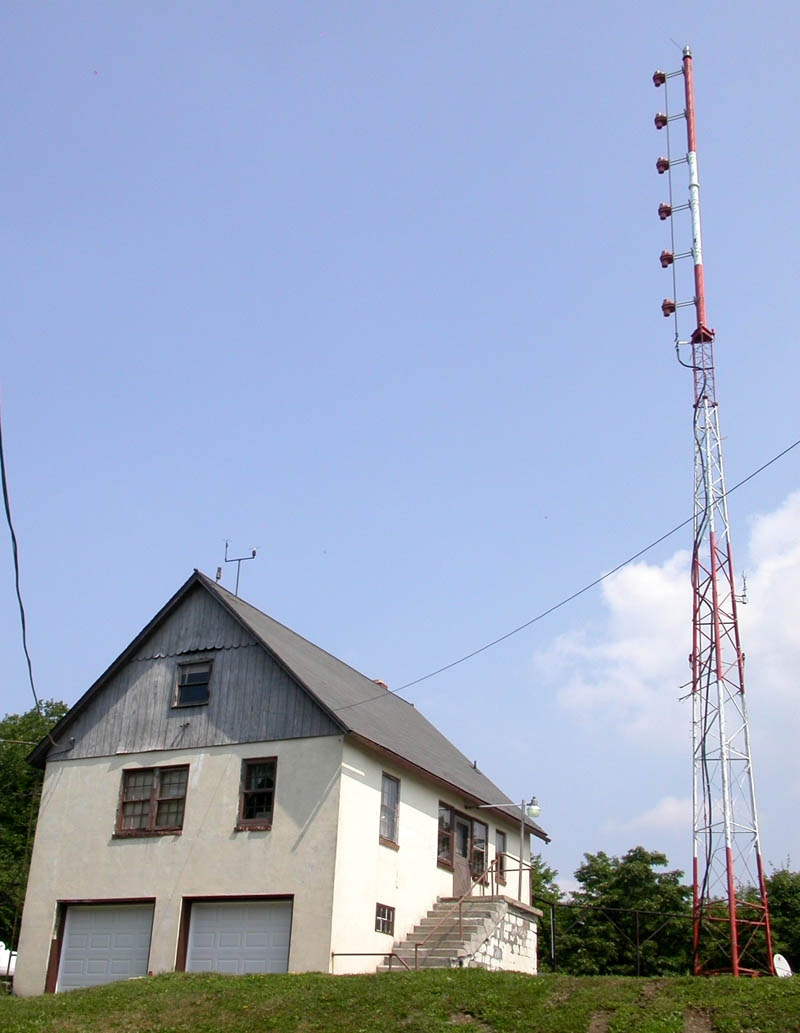
An August 2005 photo of WJIV's studio and tower. Derelict weather instruments atop the roof are a reminder of the daily "Weather Roundup" reports that aired on the Rural Radio Network.

WJIV (101.9 FM "Victory 101.9") is a commercial radio station licensed to Cherry Valley, New York, and serving the Mohawk Valley. The radio format is primarily Christian along with some Southern gospel music. WJIV has an effective radiated power (ERP) of 11,500 watts. The transmitter is about 3 miles (5 km) east of Cherry Valley village. The signal gives secondary coverage to Capital District, including Albany and Schenectady, as well as Oneonta and Utica/Rome.

== History ==
On June 6, 1948, the station first signed on as WVCV, as part of the Rural Radio Network, a service that provided farming news and rural entertainment to areas that generally lacked this type of specialized programming. The network stretched across much of Upstate New York, in an era where few people owned FM receivers.

A call sign change to WRRC was made in 1953 to reinforce the station's "Rural Radio" identity. The Rural Radio Network survived until 1960, dropping most of the farm related programming in favor of an over-the-air simulcast of classical music station 96.3 WQXR-FM New York City, along with live weather reports for each of the stations in the network every hour.

On February 1, 1960, the network was purchased by the Ivy Broadcasting Company, a corporation headed by Woody Erdman. In April 1966, Ivy sold WJIV and the other four FM stations to Chenango and Unadilla Communications, a small upstate New York telephone company. In 1968, C&U was acquired by Continental Telephone, however FCC regulations prohibited control of broadcast licenses by large phone companies - so Continental was forced to divest WJIV.

Televangelist Pat Robertson acquired the five-station network as a tax-deductible gift. Mr. Robertson was already operating Channel 27 WYAH-TV and FM station WXRI in Virginia Beach, and incorporated the five upstate New York stations into his Christian Broadcasting Network (CBN) on January 1, 1969. CBN programmed mostly Christian Contemporary music with some religious instructional shows also heard.

Floyd Dykeman purchased WJIV from CBN on March 30, 1981, and kept the religious format. Dykeman increased the station's power to its current level in 1984, then sold the station to Detroit-based religious broadcaster Midwest Broadcasting in 2000.

The call sign WJIV had previously been assigned to the E.D. Rivers, Jr., station on 900 kHz in Savannah, Georgia (later known as WJLG). Midwest Broadcasting changed its name to Christian Broadcasting system in 2003 .

== Current programming ==
WJIV currently offers Christian themed talk and news programs, as well as traditional religious broadcasting. The station also offers local weather and community updates throughout its broadcast day.
