= WCDO (AM) =

Radio station in Sidney, New York

- Sidney, New York; United States
- Broadcast area: Southern Tier
- Frequency: 1490 kHz
- Branding: FM 101 / AM 1490

Programming
- Format: Adult contemporary
- Affiliations: Compass Media Networks; United Stations Radio Networks; Westwood One

Ownership
- Owner: Dave Mance; (CDO Broadcasting, Inc.)
- Sister stations: WCDO-FM

History
- First air date: January 18, 1982
- Former call signs: WSID (1982–1984)
- Call sign meaning: Chenango, Delaware, Otsego

Technical information
- Licensing authority: FCC
- Facility ID: 9685
- Class: C
- Power: 1,000 watts unlimited
- Transmitter coordinates: 42°19′24″N 75°22′57″W
- Translator: 92.3 W222CR (Norwich)

Links
- Public license information: Public file; LMS
- Webcast: Listen Live
- Website: wcdoonline.com

WCDO (1490 kHz) is an AM radio station broadcasting an adult contemporary format licensed to Sidney, New York, United States. The station is owned by Dave Mance under the name of CDO Broadcasting, Inc., and features programming from Compass Media Networks, United Stations Radio Networks, and Westwood One.

The station simulcasts its sister station WCDO-FM 100.9.

== History ==
The station went on the air as WCDO on January 18, 1982. On August 1, 1984, it changed its call sign to WSID and on July 6, 1985, to the current WCDO.
