= WCDO-FM =

- Sidney, New York; United States
- Frequency: 100.9 MHz
- Branding: FM 101 (Sidney) /92.3 (Norwich)/ AM 1490

Programming
- Format: Adult contemporary
- Affiliations: Compass Media Networks; United Stations Radio Networks; Westwood One

Ownership
- Owner: Dave Mance; (CDO Broadcasting Inc.)
- Sister stations: WCDO (AM)

History
- First air date: May 8, 1982
- Call sign meaning: Chenango, Delaware, Otsego

Technical information
- Licensing authority: FCC
- Facility ID: 9686
- Class: A
- ERP: 1,900 watts
- HAAT: 176 meters (577 ft)
- Transmitter coordinates: 42°17′33″N 75°22′03″W

Links
- Public license information: Public file; LMS
- Webcast: Listen Live
- Website: wcdoonline.com

WCDO-FM (100.9 MHz) is a news and information/adult contemporary radio station in Chenango, Delaware, and Otsego Counties (plus portions of Broome County) in Upstate New York. The station simulcasts its sister station WCDO (1490 AM) and 92.3 FM in Norwich.

WCDO's adult contemporary format includes adult hits and plays songs from the 1970s to the present. WCDO also claims to be the local news leader with local news 12 times each weekday. Local sports coverage is also provided covering high school football and basketball for five school districts: Afton, Bainbridge-Guilford, Harpursville, Sidney, and Unatego.
