= WSEN =

- Mexico, New York; United States
- Broadcast area: Syracuse area
- Frequency: 103.9 MHz
- Branding: 103.9 The Dinosaur

Programming
- Format: Classic hits
- Affiliations: Compass Media Networks; Westwood One

Ownership
- Owner: Craig Fox; (Wolf Radio, Inc.)
- Sister stations: WFBL; WMBO; WMVN; WOLF; WOLF-FM; WOSW; WQSE-LD; WVOA

History
- First air date: January 1997 (as WNDR)
- Former call signs: WUPN (1995–1996); WNDR (1996–1998); WVOQ (1998–2001); WVOA (2001–2002); WVOA-FM (2002–2009); WVOU (2009); WVOA-FM (2009–2013); WNDR-FM (2013–2016); WSEN-FM (2016–2017)

Technical information
- Licensing authority: FCC
- Facility ID: 67058
- Class: A
- ERP: 3,000 watts
- HAAT: 89 meters
- Transmitter coordinates: 43°28′36″N 76°16′44″W
- Translator: See § Simulcasts and translators
- Repeater: See § Simulcasts and translators

Links
- Public license information: Public file; LMS
- Webcast: Listen live
- Website: www.dinofm.com

WSEN (103.9 MHz) is an FM radio station licensed to Mexico, New York, United States. The station serves the Syracuse area and is currently owned by Wolf Radio, Inc., owned by Craig Fox.

== History ==
The station was assigned the call sign WUPN on April 14, 1995, before giving those calls to the current WPNY-LD, a television station (as its call sign indicated, a UPN affiliate) in Utica, in May 1996. Then, on May 6, 1996, the station changed its call sign to WNDR (picking up the calls previously heard on the current WSKO). It signed on in January 1997 as a simulcast of WVOA (105.1 FM); it became WVOQ in late 1998, WVOA on April 25, 2001 (picking up the call sign and programming from 105.1 after its sale to Clear Channel Communications), WVOU on May 19, 2009 (during a period in which the WVOA-FM call letters were moved back to 105.1 after Craig Fox reacquired that station), and then back to WVOA-FM on September 8, 2009 (after 105.1 became WOLF-FM). The -FM suffix was added to the WVOA call sign on May 7, 2002; this was the result of an unrealized construction permit for an AM station in DeWitt with the WVOA call sign that was commonly owned with the station. Despite a similarity in call signs, there was no relation between WVOA-FM and the Voice of America service.

Most of WVOA's programming was religious in nature; however, some non-religious programming aired on the station, including "The Wax Museum with Ronnie Dark", a program dedicated to garage rock, progressive rock, British Invasion music, and deep cuts from the 1960s and 1970s, and "Hablando con Central New York" (Talking with Central New York), a Spanish language talk show hosted by Hugo Acosta.

On October 5, 2013, WVOA moved its programming and call sign to an analog low-power television station on channel 6 in Syracuse; such stations broadcast their audio feeds on 87.7 MHz, a channel generally receivable on most FM radios. The station then changed back to WNDR-FM and began stunting with Christmas music. On December 26, 2013, WNDR began stunting with all-Beatles, branded as "WBTL". On January 20, 2014, WNDR-FM ended stunting and launched a classic hits format, branded as "The Dinosaur".

On April 6, 2016, the WNDR-FM call letters were swapped with WSEN-FM. The -FM suffix was dropped from the WSEN call sign on August 21, 2017.

== Simulcasts and translators ==
Call sign	Frequency	City of license	Facility ID	Power W	ERP W	Height m (ft)	Class	Transmitter coordinates
WOLF-HD2	92.1 FM (HD)	Baldwinsville, New York	7716	—	25,000	99 m (325 ft)	B1	43°09′10″N 76°11′35″W
WMVN-HD2	100.3 FM (HD)	Sylvan Beach, New York	85534	—	6,000	100 m (330 ft)	A	43°14′46.2″N 75°46′23.7″W
WMBO	1340 AM	Auburn, New York	25001	1,000	—	—	C	42°57′5.2″N 76°35′3.8″W
WFBL	1390 AM	Syracuse, New York	34821	5,000	—	—	B	43°09′10″N 76°11′35″W

Call sign	Frequency	City of license	FID	ERP (W)	Class	Transmitter coordinates	FCC info	Notes
W231CS	94.1 FM	Elmwood, Syracuse	155848	250	D	43°03′30″N 76°10′00″W	LMS	Relays WOLF-HD2
W237AY	95.3 FM	Dewitt, New York	77734	250	D	43°00′25″N 76°05′38″W	LMS	Relays WOLF-HD2
W279CK	103.7 FM	Durhamville, New York	143405	100	D	43°03′57″N 75°40′05″W	LMS	Relays WMVN-HD2
W291CV	106.1 FM	Auburn, New York	147996	210	D	42°57′05″N 76°35′05″W	LMS	Relays WMBO
W298DC	107.5 FM	Liverpool, New York	202588	250	D	43°08′00″N 76°20′19″W	LMS	Relays WFBL
