= WSKO (AM) =

Coordinates: 43°01′32″N 76°03′55″W

- Syracuse, New York; United States
- Broadcast area: Central New York
- Frequency: 1260 kHz
- Branding: The Score 1260

Programming
- Format: Sports
- Affiliations: Westwood One Sports; BetMGM Network; Syracuse Mets

Ownership
- Owner: Cumulus Media; (Radio License Holding CBC, LLC)
- Sister stations: WAQX-FM, WNTQ

History
- First air date: 1946; 80 years ago (as WNDR)
- Former call signs: WNDR (1946–1996); WNSS (1996–2010)
- Call sign meaning: W SKOre

Technical information
- Licensing authority: FCC
- Facility ID: 50515
- Class: B
- Power: 5,000 watts

Links
- Public license information: Public file; LMS
- Webcast: Listen live
- Website: thescore1260.com

WSKO (1260 kHz) is a commercial AM radio station in Syracuse, New York. It has a sports radio format and is owned by Cumulus Media with studios on James Street. "The Score" is the flagship station for all Syracuse Mets baseball games. In addition to carrying Westwood One Sports, and selected shows from BetMGM Network, a local program is heard on weekends, Outside The Box with Mark Rowlands.

By day, WSKO’s power is 5,000 watts non-directional. At night, to protect other stations on 1260 kHz from interference, it switches to a directional antenna with a four-tower array. The transmitter is on Andrews Road in DeWitt, near Interstate 481.

== History ==
=== MOR and Top 40 ===
The station signed on the air in 1946. The original call sign was WNDR. It was a network affiliate of the Mutual Broadcasting System airing its dramas, comedies, variety shows, news and sports. In the 1950s, network programming began moving from radio to television. During that time, the station began its run as a full service, middle of the road popular music station. Among its 1950s-era staffers was character actor and Golden Globe nominee Aldo Ray, who worked there in 1956 during an extended break in his film career. A publicity photo of him taken at the station survives and is reproduced on a station tribute website.

In the 1960s, WNDR was the most popular Top 40 station in the Syracuse area. The studio and 5,000-watt transmitter were located on Andrews Road in DeWitt, a Syracuse suburb. During the station's heyday, personalities who would later achieve success in major markets including Bud Ballou, Peter Cavanaugh, Bob Shannon, Joey Reynolds, and—for a very brief time in a rare excursion outside Buffalo—Danny Neaverth. In the 1980s, it switched to country music. But over time, FM radio became more popular for music listening and WNDR saw its ratings decline.

=== News and Comedy ===
Logo as ESPN Radio 1260, used from 2001 until 2010

It adopted the call sign WNSS in 1996. It tried airing an all-news format under the branding of "W-News". It used reports from CBS Radio News and AP Radio, along with a local reporting staff.

In 2000, it made an ill-fated change to an all-comedy radio, using a national comedy radio service. But that did not last long.

=== Sports Radio ===
Later in 2000, it flipped to Sports radio. At first, WNSS was mostly a satellite feed from the ESPN Radio network, including ESPN's MLB and NBA broadcasts. During most of this period, WNSS was the flagship station of Syracuse University Orange football along with sister station WAQX, until WTKW acquired the rights in 2007. The station was also the home of the Syracuse Chiefs from 2010 to 2012, the Syracuse Crunch from 2010 to 2013, and the Buffalo Bills Radio Network until its parent company dropped Bills broadcasts across all of its stations after the 2011 season.

Effective March 2010, ESPN Radio was dropped from WNSS, replaced with CBS Sports Radio. ESPN Radio began airing on WTLA and WSGO. The nationally syndicated Imus in the Morning show became WNSS's new morning program, migrating from 620 WHEN. WNSS also rebranded as "The Score 1260", switched its network affiliation to Sporting News Radio, and increased its emphasis on local sports. The station also changed its callsign to WSKO to reflect this.

=== Past Personalities ===
Former local programs include: On the Block with Brent Axe, 2-6pm. heard on WHEN until early 2009. Axe's program was unaffected by the station's March 2010 programming changes, with the exception of an expansion by one hour. The Danny Parkins Show, hosted by Danny Parkins was added for the 12noon-2pm weekday shift on June 1, 2010.

In March 2011, Parkins left WSKO to take a job at KCSP 610 Sports Radio in Kansas City. Midday with Mike Lindsley took over the midday slot on WSKO noon-2pm until the end of 2012. At that point, the show became The Afternoon Drive after the departure of Brent Axe. In late March 2013, Lindsley left WSKO to take a job at WTMM 104.5 The Team in Albany, New York.

In June 2025, mid-morning hosts Jim Lerch and Paul Esden, Jr., known as The Manchild Show with Boy Green, announced that their show was ending on WSKO and would resume online; they can be seen and heard on the "MCShowDigital" channel on YouTube.
