= Craig Fox (radio host) =

American media executive

Craig L. Fox is a broadcasting station owner in New York state in the United States. As of 2013, he controls five companies which, between them, own 5 AM radio stations, 4 FM radio stations not counting FM translators, and 11 low-power television stations of which 6 are class A television stations. All of the stations are in New York state. Fox is based in Syracuse, New York.

== See also ==
- List of stations and licensees owned by Craig Fox
