= Ian Eagle =

American sports announcer (born 1969)

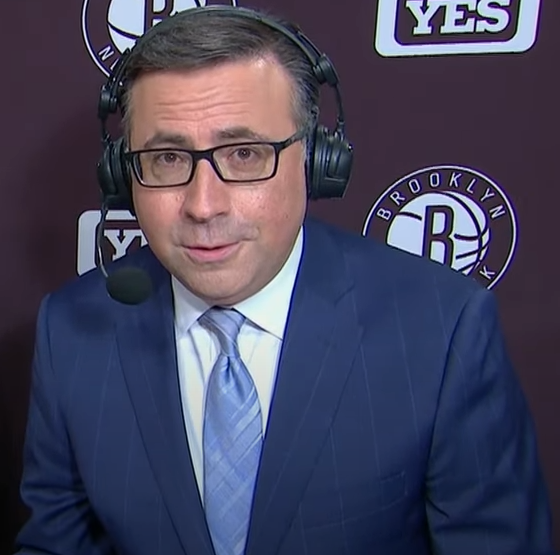
- Eagle in 2021
- Born: February 9, 1969 (age 57); Miami, Florida, U.S.
- Other name: "Bird"
- Education: Syracuse University
- Occupation: Sports announcer/commentator
- Years active: 1992–present
- Spouse: Alisa Eagle
- Children: 2 including Noah
- Parents: Jack Eagle (father); Monica Maris (mother)

Ian Eagle (/ˈaɪ.ən/ EYE-ən; born February 9, 1969) is an American sports announcer. He calls NFL and college basketball games on CBS, as well as NBA games on Prime Video and Brooklyn Nets games on the YES Network, for which he has been the voice since 1995. Since 2024, Eagle has been the lead announcer of the NCAA Tournament on CBS and TNT Sports. Other announcing experiences include Army–Navy football games, boxing, and NCAA track and field for CBS.

== Early life and education ==
Eagle was born in Miami to entertainers Jack Eagle and Monica Maris. Jack, a former "Catskills comedian" and commercial actor, was best known for portraying "Brother Dominic" and "Mr. Cholesterol" in Xerox and Fleischmann's margarine television commercials respectively in the 1970s. Maris was a singer.

Eagle grew up in Forest Hills, Queens, in New York City where his favorite sport was baseball and his favorite team was the New York Mets. His favorite announcer growing up was Marv Albert. He graduated from Syracuse University's S. I. Newhouse School of Public Communications in 1990. He was a member of Alpha Epsilon Pi.

== Career ==
=== Early career ===
While at Syracuse, Eagle joined WJPZ his freshman year and announced women's basketball games at the Carrier Dome. In his sophomore year, he was given more opportunities to call high-profile Syracuse Orangemen games on WAER, a student run radio station. He also joined UUTV (now CitrusTV), to gain on-camera experience. Outside the campus, Eagle interned with then-recent graduate Mike Tirico at WTVH in Syracuse for three years. He hosted 10 shows during his senior year.

Following his graduation in 1990, Eagle began working for WFAN Radio in New York City as a producer. In 1992, WFAN gave him his own show (Bagels and Baseball). In 1993, Eagle was given pregame and postgame duties for the Jets. 1994 saw Eagle's first year as a Nets play-by-play radio announcer. A year later, he was made a TV announcer for SportsChannel, which later became Fox Sports Net New York (now MSG Plus). In 1997, WFAN made Eagle play-by-play announcer for Jets games.

=== Later television and radio career ===
Eagle joined CBS in 1998 doing announcing work for NFL and NCAA basketball. He continues to serve these roles today. In 2010, he joined Dan Fouts to make up the number three broadcast team for CBS' NFL coverage. The pair was elevated to the number two team behind Jim Nantz and Phil Simms in the 2014 season. After Fouts parted ways with CBS, and with the NFL's playoff expansion, which included CBS gaining rights to an extra playoff game, during the 2020 offseason, the network paired him with former Fox analyst Charles Davis. Until 2026, J. J. Watt was Eagle’s partner on the number two broadcast team, while Davis succeeded Gary Danielson as lead analyst for CBS's college football coverage. Eagle is currently paired with Ross Tucker on the number two team. Other CBS work for Eagle includes boxing, The Pilot Pen Tennis tournament, the U.S. Open (both the late night show and daytime studio host for 2008 U.S. Open coverage), and the NCAA Track and Field Championships.

Prior to joining the YES Network as Nets announcer in 2002, Ian Eagle served the same role for the Nets on the MSG Network and Fox Sports Net New York. When Marv Albert joined the YES Network prior to the 2005-06 NBA season, the games were split between the two broadcasters, before Eagle again became the primary announcer for the Nets in the 2011-12 NBA season upon Albert's departure.

During the 2010 NBA Playoffs, Eagle called two games on TNT, a likely move to promote him to calling national television broadcasts, similar to what Albert, former Minnesota Timberwolves play-by-play man Kevin Harlan and Knicks play-by-play man Mike Breen experienced. He was again called up by TNT for the 2011 NBA Playoffs, pairing with his YES colleague Mike Fratello. He has since continued to cover the NBA Playoffs for TNT through the first two rounds, though the number of games fluctuates on whether the Nets make the playoffs (in 2019 and 2020, with the Nets making the playoffs, he instead covered the team locally on YES and missed the entire 1st round of TNT coverage, with Spero Dedes filling in. He returned to cover part of the Raptors-76ers 2nd round series for TNT). He also does play-by-play for Thursday Night Football on Westwood One. On Sirius, in addition to his daily talk show, Eagle did a weekly talk show, The Phil Jackson Show, with Los Angeles Lakers coach Phil Jackson, and Eagle retains his roots to WFAN, occasionally serving as a fill-in talk show host on his old station.

Eagle also serves as the voice-over host of NBA Action replacing Spero Dedes in 2005 and previously, NBA Jam. In 2013, he called the international telecasts of the 2013 NBA Finals alongside Jim Spanarkel, his partner on Nets broadcasts on YES.

Prior to the 2019-20 NBA season, it was announced that as a replacement to the recently eliminated "Players Only" broadcasts which occurred on Tuesday nights beginning during the second half of the season, TNT would instate a more traditional broadcast format to their Tuesday Night slate of games. Eagle was announced to be one of the play-by-play announcers to the weekly scheduled doubleheader, along with Brewers announcer Brian Anderson. Eagle was partnered with either Stan Van Gundy or Jim Jackson.

In October 2022, it was announced that Eagle would succeed Jim Nantz as the lead play-by-play announcer for CBS and TNT Sports' coverage of the NCAA Tournament starting in 2024.

Following TNT's loss of NBA rights, Eagle joined Prime Video as a lead play-by-play announcer for the streaming service's NBA coverage. He shares these duties with Kevin Harlan, but is expected to work the service's conference finals coverage. Eagle and Harlan will both remain with CBS and TNT for their NFL and college basketball duties.

Since Eagle pronounces his first name "EYE-un" (instead of the more common "EE-an"), he has often admitted that life was easier prior to the 1986 release of the movie Iron Eagle. In fact, many callers (including prominent sports figures) continue to call him "Iron Eagle"—much to his chagrin.

== Other announcing ==
- French Open for Tennis Channel
- Masters Online commentary of Amen corner 09
- Voice of the announcer for NBA 07, 08 and 09 for PSP
- NBA playoff announcing for NBA TV
- Westwood One radio play by play 1996 Atlanta Olympics
- Hosts NBA Action, a weekly highlights and features show for NBA TV
- Announces preseason New York Jets telecasts on WCBS-TV in New York
- Host of Nets Magazine, a look inside the Brooklyn Nets for the YES Network
- Voiceover for Modell's radio commercials and in-store voiceovers
- Voice of NBA Action from 2004 to present
- Co-hosts Power Performances presented by Courtyard by Marriott on CBS.Sportsline.com
- NFL Thursday Night games on Westwood One, with Trent Green as his color man
- Lee Myles Commercials
- On the song Games by Dog Eat Dog
- Voice of announcer on NBA Shootout video game series by 989 Sports.
- Commentator and playable character on NBA Playgrounds by Saber Interactive.

== Personal life ==
Eagle lives in Essex Fells, New Jersey with his wife Alisa. They have two children, Noah and Erin. Noah, also a Syracuse alum, is a play-by-play announcer for college football and college basketball on NBC, the Brooklyn Nets on YES Network, and has held the same role for NFL coverage on NBC and Nickelodeon.

== Awards ==
- Bob Costas Award for Outstanding Sportscasting (while at Syracuse)
- (2002, 2013, 2016, 2017) New York Sports Emmy Award: On Camera Talent: Sports Play by Play
- 2013: WAER Wall of Fame
- 2020: The Big Lead Play-by-Play Announcer of the Year
- 2022: National Sports Media Association Sportscaster of the Year
- 2024: National Sports Media Association Sportscaster of the Year

Preceded by Greg Gumbel	#2 play-by-play announcer, NFL on CBS; 2014–present	Succeeded by Incumbent
Preceded by Jim Nantz	Play-by-play announcer, NCAA Men's Final Four; 2024–present	Succeeded by Incumbent
