= Tony Caridi =

American sportscaster

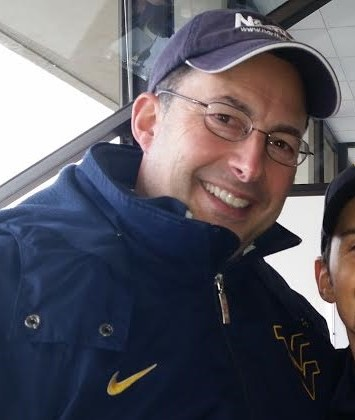
- Caridi in November 2014
- Born: September 8, 1962 (age 63); Lockport, New York, United States
- Education: Syracuse University
- Occupations: Sportscaster, author
- Website: www.tonycaridi.com

Tony Caridi (born September 8, 1962) is a children's book author and an American sportscaster for West Virginia University's Mountaineer Sports Network and West Virginia Radio Corporation's Metronews Radio Network.

== Early life ==
Caridi was born on September 8, 1962, in Lockport, New York. Caridi's desire to become a play-by-play announcer was inspired by his experiences listening to the NBA's Buffalo Braves, the NHL's Buffalo Sabres, and the NFL's Buffalo Bills.

== Education ==
Caridi graduated from Lockport High School in 1980. He attended the State University of New York at Geneseo and studied communications as a freshman and sophomore. An internship with Clip Smith at ABC affiliate WKBW-TV Buffalo made Caridi realize he needed more of a challenge. He transferred to Syracuse University's S. I. Newhouse School of Public Communications. Upon graduating from Syracuse in 1984, Caridi worked for WHEN Radio in Syracuse doing overnight news.

At Syracuse, Caridi was a classmate of prominent national sportscasters. His peers included Sean McDonough of ESPN and Monday Night Football; Dan Hoard, Voice of the Cincinnati Bengals and Cincinnati Bearcats; Greg Papa, former Voice of the Oakland Raiders and currently the San Francisco 49ers; Bill Roth, Voice of the Virginia Tech Hokies and former Voice of the UCLA Bruins; Jim Jackson, Voice of the Philadelphia Flyers; Rich Cimini, New York Jets reporter for ESPN.com; and Craig Minervini of the WWE.

== Career ==
Caridi arrived in West Virginia in 1984, and expected to stay for a few months when he was hired by Hoppy Kercheval to work afternoon news for WAJR-AM Morgantown. He was one of two finalists for the job, so West Virginia Radio Corporation president Dale Miller (who was station general manager at the time) suggested a coin toss to decide which candidate to hire. Caridi won the flip. He assumed the role of Sports Director when Metronews was created two years later. Caridi took over as host of the Northside Automotive Statewide Sportsline in 1986 and continues in that role today.

Through Caridi's Syracuse connection, several national broadcasters started their careers at West Virginia Radio Corporation's Metronews Radio Network – Dave Pasch, Voice of the Arizona Cardinals and ESPN's College Football and NBA coverage; Dave Ryan of CBS Sports; Dave Jageler, Voice of the Washington Nationals; and Sagar Meghani of Associated Press Radio News.

=== West Virginia University ===
Caridi began working with the West Virginia University's Mountaineer Sports Network in 1987 as a television play-by-play announcer and feature reporter. He worked his first WVU basketball game on the MSN-TV Network on February 20, 1988, in a Mountaineers loss to the Rhode Island Rams at Madison Square Garden in New York City. Caridi assumed radio play-by-play duties on MSN in 1997, replacing Jack Fleming. Fleming, the longtime Voice of the Pittsburgh Steelers and West Virginia Mountaineers, referred to his eventual replacement as "Top Talent." Caridi referred to Fleming as "The Voice."

Caridi has been behind the microphone for some of the Mountaineers' biggest football wins in school history, including Bowl Championship Series victories in the 2006 Sugar Bowl over the Georgia Bulldogs, the 2008 Fiesta Bowl over the Oklahoma Sooners, and the 2012 Orange Bowl over the Clemson Tigers. In March 2010, he returned to the Carrier Dome at his alma mater, Syracuse University, to broadcast the West Virginia basketball upset victory over the Kentucky Wildcats to advance the Mountaineers to the Final Four for the first time in 51 years.

Caridi partners with Brad Howe on Mountaineer basketball broadcasts. Prior to Howe, Caridi spent decades calling Mountaineer basketball games with former WVU player Jay Jacobs. He works with former Ball State head football coach Dwight Wallace and Glenville State Hall of Fame quarterback Jed Drenning on West Virginia football games. His spotter for the 1992 football season was current Drexel and former West Point head basketball coach Zach Spiker.

On December 28, 2002, Caridi broadcast two West Virginia University games (football and basketball) in the same day—one in the Eastern Time Zone and one in the Pacific Time Zone. The football game in Charlotte, North Carolina, was the 2002 Continental Tire Bowl against the Virginia Cavaliers. After a flight from Charlotte to Atlanta, he flew to Las Vegas, Nevada, to work the basketball game at UNLV.

Caridi hosts the Rich Rodriguez and the Ross Hodge statewide radio shows.

=== Other media ===
Caridi has broadcast nationally on ESPN and Westwood Radio and regionally for the Big East and Atlantic Ten television networks.

In 2002, Caridi was a founding member of Pikewood Creative, an Emmy Award-winning video production company. He continues to serve as the company's Director of Business Development.

Caridi's audio highlights were used in the 2014 ESPN 30 for 30 feature, Rand University, on two touchdown passes from Chad Pennington to Randy Moss from the August 30, 1997 Friends of Coal Bowl football game between West Virginia Mountaineers and the Marshall Thundering Herd.

Caridi served as the producer of the 2018 Emmy Award-winning documentary Hot Rod, which told the life story of legendary WVU basketball player Hot Rod Hundley.

== Awards ==
Caridi was awarded West Virginia Sportscaster of the Year and Best Network Play-By-Play for Mountaineer Football by the West Virginia Broadcasters Association. In 2022, he was inducted into Syracuse University's WAER Hall of Fame. Tony Caridi, the 30-year "Voice" of the West Virginia University Mountaineers, has been voted the 2026 Woody Durham Voice of College Sports Award winner.

== Quotes ==
After significant WVU victories, Caridi declared, "It is a great day to be a Mountaineer, wherever you may be!"

In March 2010, following West Virginia's win against Kentucky in the East Regional Final of the NCAA Tournament, Caridi announced, "Good-bye Big Blue—hello, Gold and Blue. The West Virginia Mountaineers are going to the Final Four!"

== Children's Book Author ==
In 2016, Caridi published a children's book, Where, Oh Where, Oh Where Could We Go? Traveling West Virginia High and Low, about places in West Virginia. Caridi was inspired to write a children's book after he and his wife volunteered with the Read Aloud program in Monongalia County Schools.
