= Derrin Horton =

American sportscaster

Derrin Horton is an American sportscaster and voice actor based in Los Angeles, California. He was selected to be the public address announcer for the Los Angeles Lakers' basketball games at Crypto.com Arena in October of 2026, replacing longtime Lakers public-address announcer Lawrence Tanter. He was a sports anchor for KTLA. Horton has also been a play-by-play announcer and anchor for ESPN and Fox Sports Net. He is also a network and TV affiliate voiceover actor.

== Early life and education ==
Horton was born in Washington, D.C., but grew up in Queens, New York. He graduated from the Holy Cross High School in Flushing, New York in 1986.

Horton attended S.I. Newhouse School of Public Communications at Syracuse University and graduated in 1991. At Syracuse, he worked at the student-run WAER station & Citrus TV, calling Syracuse Orange sports.

== Career ==
Horton became a sportscaster for KCAL-TV in Los Angeles, California in 1998. This was before the CBS Corporation duopoly started and KCAL and KCBS consolidated their on-air and production teams.

He joined NFL Network at the start of the 2004 NFL season where he served as an anchor, reporter and host. Horton provides in-depth interviews, post-game reports, and sideline reports for the Network. He also serves as the host and narrator for the Network's documentary series NFL Top 10.

Horton was also on an episode of Spike TV's Pros VS. Joes, in which he lost in overtime to Sal Masekela.
