= CitrusTV =

Student television station in Syracuse, New York

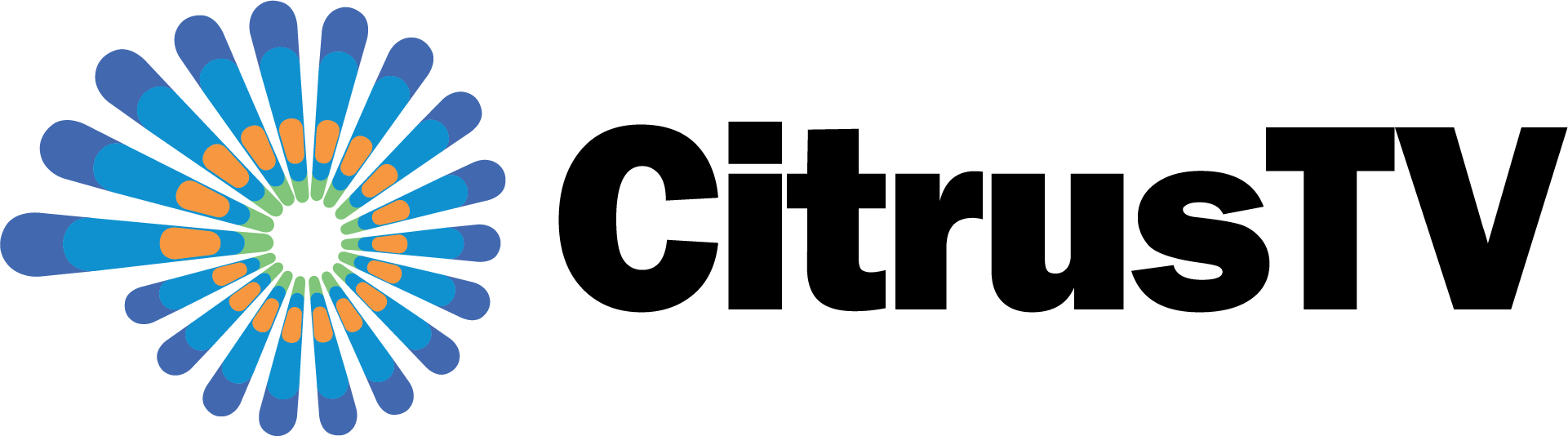
- Syracuse, New York; United States

Ownership
- Owner: Syracuse University students

History
- Founded: 1970
- Former names: Synapse, UUTV, HillTV

Links
- Website: citrustv.com

CitrusTV is the completely student-run television studio of Syracuse University and SUNY ESF in Syracuse, New York. It was founded in 1970 and has more than 350 student members.

The organization is not a station, network or channel and does not broadcast its own programming, except for online streaming. Instead, CitrusTV provides programming, both live and taped—primarily to its website, YouTube, and the Orange Television Network, which is the university-controlled cable network available in all campus buildings on channel 24.2.

== History ==
=== Synapse era (1970–1977) ===
The organization was founded in 1970 as the Syracuse University Union student-run video program through its kickoff event "Alternatives in Communications Media" featuring a lecture by Marshall McLuhan, a concert by the Jefferson Airplane, and its main event, the "Multimedia Phenomenon" in Manley Field House. In 1972, University Union was granted the former Watson Dormitory dining hall as an interim UU center, with funding to construct a theater, the Community Darkrooms, and the first color television studio on the SU campus, edit rooms, and offices to teach and promote portable video production. Students designed and built the cable television system connecting large TV monitors in most campus buildings. They named the program Synapse, and soon began looking for funds to sustain the students, many of whom were now graduating. They secured a grant from the New York State Council on the Arts to run the Artist Visitation Program where students could work with video artists from around the state exploring the nascent use of video technology as a formal art medium. By the mid-1970s, the Synapse Artist Visitation Program expanded into the new Newhouse Communication Center, working at night and mostly on the 2" video tape machines editing artistic works shot on small format recorders. In 1977, Synapse ended its use of the Watson studio and formalized its association with the Newhouse School continuing its NYSCA post-production program following a National Endowment for the Arts grant to control 2" video editing by computer. Watson studio and the cable television system were now run again only by students as UUTV.

UUTV and Synapse were conceived as a center for experimental video productions using the "portable" video equipment that was just becoming available in the early 1970s. By current standards, the "portable" equipment would be considered ludicrously heavy and bulky, and barely portable at all.

During these years there was a continuing debate between those who favored more conventional approaches to programming and those who envisioned more experimental and creative approaches. In 1971, cables were run across the campus to various locations where students could watch the programming, including dormitory lounges, the S.I. Newhouse School of Public Communications, and the basement of the E.S. Bird Library. At its peak, the system had over 100 monitors able to receive the programming.

Early founding members included Carl Geiger and Bill Viola, who helped build the cable system. In 1972, Synapse began operating in Watson Hall. A color three-camera television studio was built. Visiting artists who recorded material at the studio included members of The Firesign Theatre. Operations were managed by Gail Waldron, Bob Burns and Lance Wisniewski. Synapse recorded music concerts and prominent speakers on campus. Synapse had a portable system which was used to record the feelings of inmates at Attica Prison following the Attica prison riot.

In 1973, Henry Baker organized remote coverage for Richard Nixon's second inauguration and the demonstrations in Washington. In 1974, wishing to expand its offerings, Synapse sought and received outside support from the New York State Council on the Arts. Artists in a visiting artists program visited Synapse and used the facilities for the production of video art pieces for several more years.

Other projects included Carl Geiger designing and building new electronic image making tools and producing an elaborate experiment called “Multi-Origination Dance Piece." Synapse maintained master edits and a tape collection with copies of works produced through the programs. They actively encouraged wide distribution of the produced work, especially broadcast.

In 1977, Synapse left Watson Theatre, leaving behind the color production studio and campus cable system. Synapse forged an association with the S.I. Newhouse School of Public Communications, with which it shared its production equipment and studio facilities, and continued one of its functions as an independent production house for experimental video, allowing access to the community and to video artists, as well as producing some of its own productions.

In 1981, SU had become dissatisfied with the curricular component of their relationship with Synapse. While executive director Henry Baker made a proposal that redefined the educational aspects of the Synapse Program, SU rejected the plan and elected to terminate the program. Synapse moved off campus and closed in November 1981.

=== UUTV era (1977–2004) ===
The color production studio and campus cable system were taken over by the largest student-run organization on campus, University Union, which also programmed film screenings, concerts, speakers, and later established a radio station, WERW (We are UU). The television station was reorganized as University Union Television, or UUTV. Though technically under the control of University Union, the station had its own management, which reported to those in charge of University Union as a separate "board." Despite this oversight, the station usually ran autonomously. There was also a faculty advisor nominally responsible for oversight.

The station remained entirely run by students, who programmed the station and produced television programming in-house, including a nightly half-hour news program. UUTV also occasionally aired X-Rated films in the early 80s, largely to generate publicity. Early student productions included "Newswatch," (1977–1984), a comedy show which had a format almost identical to that of Comedy Central's "The Daily Show," which did not come on the air until the 1990s, though "Newswatch" was frankly derivative of the "Weekend Update" segment of "Saturday Night Live," which premiered in 1975. Several of the shows including Newswatch 'bicycled' their tapes over to Syracuse Cable TV, and had them aired on the cable TV system's Public-access television channel.

Another long-running show was "Null & Void," a sketch comedy show (somewhat of a replacement for "Newswatch") that ran almost 20 years, starting in January 1987; its premise of the programming at a fictional low-rent TV station was strongly influenced by SCTV. Another popular show during the years 1990–1992 was "Uncle Bobo's World of Fun" which included such colorful characters as Texas Bob Stone and Marty the Fishboy.

The station also continually broadcast a sports-talk show, and each semester ran "The Bio Answer Show," in which University biology professor Marvin Druger would broadcast the answers to that evening's biology exam, so that the large number of students taking the class would not have to wait several days to find out how they did on the test. "The Rhythm," a popular music video program created by undergrad Dawn Jordan featuring music and interviews from R&B, Rap, Reggae and Urban Contemporary artists, was another popular show during this era and added diversity to both the station's programming and the channel's production staff.

The station also programmed professionally produced television shows from television's past, such as "The Twilight Zone" and "Star Trek." Some of these were 16 millimeter films shown on the station's film chain. Though the films were rented from a local film library, the legality of showing them over the campus cable system was never clear. Many eyebrows were raised when UUTV showed several recent theatrical releases even before HBO had screened them, including "Raiders of the Lost Ark." During this period, the station was on the air approximately seven hours per day, seven days per week.

In 1989, an organization called "U-Net," an association of college-based broadcasters, began showing some of UUTV's productions at various colleges around the nation, including "Null and Void." This led to a clip of "Null and Void" appearing on the national show "Entertainment Tonight."

During the early 90s, UUTV established a relationship with the Syracuse cable TV franchise that enabled nearly all UUTV programs to be aired on the City of Syracuse's cable system public-access channel. During this time, the public-access channel was happy to accept and air the UUTV programming as long as it complied with some rudimentary decency standards. There were a few shows that could not clear the decency hurdle, but for the most part, all of the UUTV programming eventually found its way on to public-access.

The nightly newscast (Campus 7 News) and the once-a-week morning show (Sun Up) both did this, along with most of the station's entertainment and sports programs. Campus 7 News was aired at 10 p.m. on the public-access channel, leading the show to be tagged by its producers as "Central New York's Only Prime-Time Newscast," which it was.

The arrangement with Syracuse's public-access channel quickly became the only remaining practical outlet to distribute UUTV programming. During this time, the campus' original closed-circuit TV network was generally not maintained by the university at even the most basic level. As all of the campus dorm rooms were re-wired for commercial cable TV, the campus closed-circuit TV network was pushed out of the dorm rooms and relegated to the "dorm lounge areas." It became logistically difficult for students to view the campus network. As TVs quickly became a standard fixture in every dorm room, students rarely watched TV in the dorm lounge areas, and the campus closed-circuit network faded into obscurity.

The demise of the campus' closed-circuit TV network did not dampen the enthusiasm of the students at UUTV. The organization continued to attract record numbers of students and regularly produced a full complement of news, sports and entertainment programs every semester. During this time, SU exercised almost zero oversight over the station, which empowered students to experiment, learn, have fun, and create any type of show their hearts desired. With the absence of university oversight, and no ratings to fret about, UUTV became a fertile ground for experimentation and learning. In some nominal sense, UUTV had returned to its Synapse roots.

Over the years, there was sporadic controversy about the station's funding. Some student government members thought that the student fee should not be funding educational opportunities for those students working at the station, and that UUTV's film programming was wasteful and duplicative of the UU Film Board's programming. Several times, the station was given a budget allocation of $0 during the annual student government budget hearings, yet with help from the larger UU organization, was always able to bounce back.

In 1999, UUTV's great grandparent, Light Works Community Darkrooms, re-entered UUTV's life in a most unexpected manner. SU announced that they had accepted a very substantial grant, which would further develop the photography program of Light Works Community Darkrooms. Unfortunately, Light Works was physically located directly next to the UUTV studios in the Watston Theater complex. Light Works was hungry to acquire the UUTV real estate for their upcoming expansion, and their newfound grant money provided the political and monetary support that they needed. SU administration was eager to accept the Light Works grant, and only nominally aware of UUTV's activities. Consequently, the original Watson Theater television studio was completely gutted to make room for the Light Works expansion. The UUTV studios and offices were moved down the hall and squeezed into a space that formerly housed the original UUTV offices and the independent student radio station, WJPZ. The Watson Theater complex was renamed the Robert B. Menschel Media Center, in recognition of the Light Works donor.

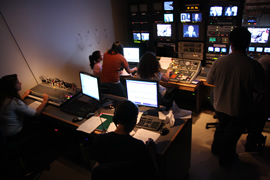
The control room during a taping of CitrusTV News during the fall 2008 semester.

Though the UUTV studio and office spaces were now significantly smaller, the station did benefit from a new complement of production equipment that was purchased as part of the relocation. In effect, SU administration had forced UUTV (and WJPZ) to accept an implicit deal that traded real-estate for new equipment.

In the early 21st century, Internet distribution of UUTV programming became technologically practical, and the station found a new outlet to distribute their programming.

=== HillTV era (2004–2005) ===
HillTV Logo used from 2004 to 2005.

In early 2004 UUTV, led by general manager Eric Fleming, split off the University Union, and became a separate student organization: HillTV. Later that year, the university trialed the Orange Television Network (OTN), which in a partnership with Time Warner Cable, gave the university two channels in residence hall and academic building cable systems. HillTV was allowed to broadcast some of its shows on OTN, and has since continued to provide OTN with some of its content.

=== Over the Hill Controversy ===
On October 18, 2005, The Daily Orange, SU's student newspaper, published a story about the content of one of HillTV's shows, Over the Hill. The show had several episodes online (some of which had also aired on the "Orange Television Network") that contained content that some people found offensive because of racial and ethnic jokes. HillTV immediately removed the show's episodes from its Web site, and shortly afterwards issued an on-air apology. The controversy sparked a letter to the university community by Chancellor Nancy Cantor, and the story was also picked up by the Syracuse Post-Standard, local TV stations and the Associated Press.

On Oct. 20, in a greatly debated and controversial decision, Nancy Cantor revoked HillTV's status as a recognized student organization, breaking the history of HillTV by punishing more than just the 'Over the Hill' team. The HillTV Web site was removed shortly afterwards. Cantor claimed she would "create a new, responsible television station." Current and past HillTV members, many faculty members and members of the university and community questioned the lack of due process Cantor displayed.

On Oct. 25, former General Manager Rich Levy and numerous former HillTV members filed a petition for reconsideration. Pressure to reinstate the station mounted from alumni, several dozen of which spoke out for reinstatement. According to The Daily Orange, one alumnus reconsidered a $25,000 donation towards the construction of a new building for the S.I. Newhouse School of Public Communications.

On November 11, SU held a hearing before a panel of three tenured faculty members at an undisclosed time and location to reconsider Cantor's decision to disband HillTV.

On November 30, the panel reversed the Chancellor's decision and reduced the punishment to a suspension and one year probationary period and required HillTV to undertake steps toward re-organization to prevent such an issue from arising in the future. Requirements under this decision included a name change for the station, as well as several forms of oversight. The panel also ruled that the university, including the Chancellor and members of her cabinet, must take responsibility for "Over the Hill." Chancellor Cantor's task force for a "new responsible television station" made suggestions to HillTV management about how to create a more diverse and welcoming environment for all campus members instead of creating an entirely new television station.

The station had planned to return under the name 'CuseTV, but that title was reportedly rejected by the university due to trademark concerns.

=== CitrusTV era (2006–present) ===
The original logo for CitrusTV designed in 2006. The station was rebranded in the fall 2008 semester.

In 2006, the television station was able to re-open under a new name: CitrusTV. During that time, the station focused on renewing its culture by altering its approach on recruiting new members and improving the attitude within the major departments. In addition, they implemented changes on how content is reviewed to avoid further controversies. In April 2006, the station provisionally regained its recognition, and by September of that same year was granted full recognition by the university.

CitrusTV now makes its content available online in addition to traditional cablecasts through the Orange Television Network and across the central New York region on Time Warner Cable Sports channel 13.

In November 2006, CitrusTV began to offer some programming via podcasting. As of 2023, new episodes of these podcasts are exclusively available on Spotify.

In November 2008, CitrusTV launched a new website, while also rebranding the station with a new logo.

CitrusTV has partnered with a variety of local and national stations to provide content to CBS Sportsline, InsideLacrosse.com, Time Warner Cable Sports and Syracuse.com.

In August 2011, CitrusTV completed a multiyear process of upgrading its studio and field equipment from Standard Definition to High Definition. It began producing content solely in 1080i, continuing to provide video to the campus Orange Television Network—the first American college campus cable station in High Definition. Video is posted online in 720p and 1080i resolutions. The upgrades were made financially possible through the Student Association and its co-curricular student fee, which is paid separate from tuition. Significant contributions from parents, studio alumni, and students themselves also supported the upgrades.

Beginning in the fall of 2012, CitrusTV began renovating its physical studio location in Watson Hall. The renovations were made in partnership with the student radio station WJPZ. It was at the time the first construction project led by a student organization on campus. The renovations were funded through private donations, and largely completed by January 2013 when the station began operating out of its expanded footprint.

During the summer of 2014, CitrusTV finalized its studio upgrades with a state-of-the-art $60,000 renovation to its main studio, including the purchase of a new desk and backdrop. This replaced the dated look that the station had previously had. The renovations were largely paid for by the student programming fee.

In July 2016, CitrusTV introduced a new website, citrustv.com. Viewers can watch CitrusTV shows and find information about supporting and joining the studio.

In 2020, 2023, and 2024, the Broadcast Education Association presented CitrusTV with the Television National Signature Station Award.

In September 2022, the University Union announced the return of the UUTV brand, for the first time in 18 years. Completely separate from CitrusTV, University Union planned to release behind-the-scenes video footage of UU events in collaboration with the Orange Television Network (OTN).

In March 2025, CitrusTV finalized another major studio upgrade, which included a refresh of the 2014 set, adding additional video and lighting elements, as well as a complete overhaul of the audio system.

== Departments ==
=== Entertainment ===
CitrusTV's Entertainment Department gives the studio a unique voice. The department has five regularly taped shows. Syracuse After Hours is a sketch comedy show limited only by its motley cast and crew's imagination and innovation. It takes on a style most comparable to NBC's Saturday Night Live.

In 2013, the department introduced two new shows. Unpeeled is an entertainment news studio show, featuring two hosts and numerous beat reporters that analyze entertainment news topics in various segments. College Eats is a cooking show targeting college students. It tapes every week during the semester and includes kitchen and field reporter segments.

In 2019, the department introduced a spinoff of After Hours titled The University News Cycle (often abbreviated to Unicycle). The University News Cycle is an in-studio comedy show, but primarily focuses on parodying college news programs. The show features campus and national news, weather, and in- and out-of-studio reporter segments.

In 2021, 'Cuse Tonight was introduced. 'Cuse Tonight is a late-night talk show in the vein of The Tonight Show. Episodes usually feature an opening monologue, comedy bits, games, correspondent segments, and a featured guest (usually a student musician or comedian).

=== News ===
Working in CitrusTV's own studio, students rotate between jobs in order to get familiar with the industry equipment and to appreciate all that goes into producing a successful newscast. From this, students are well prepared in meeting deadlines and collaborating in a newsroom environment.

The News Department produces News Live at 6, a live 30-minute newscast at 6:00 pm five days a week, as well as CitrusTV NOW, a live 5-minute news brief at 4:55 pm. These shows stream live online, broadcast live on the Orange Television Network and are posted to the station's website and YouTube channel.

Over the years, the station has won multiple awards for its news broadcasts and breaking news coverage. In 2016, the New York State Associated Press Association awarded CitrusTV's News Live at 6 at 6:00 first place in the category of Best Regularly Scheduled Local Newscast in the college division. The award was given for breaking news reporting following an Orange Alert being issued on the SU campus.

For the landmark 2008 presidential election, CitrusTV produced a live hour-and-a-half special that streamed online to about 100 viewers. Another 100 viewers watched the coverage at a station-sponsored election watch party held in Watson Theater. Similar, live election specials were produced in 2012 and 2014 (which was produced by Talking Points). In recent years, the department has also partnered with the university's undergraduate Student Association to produce live, 2-hour debates between the student government presidential candidates before elections. For the 2016 presidential election, CitrusTV produced a live three-and-a-half hour special that also streamed online and aired on the Orange Television Network. This was the first time CitrusTV aired a live broadcast at this length. In 2018, a three hour special was produced and broadcast for that years midterm elections. In 2024, the station hosted a live special report immediately following the ABC News Presidential Debate, as well a live four-hour election night special, the longest show in the station's history.

In 2008, a Spanish news program, CitrusTV Noticias en español, was introduced, making SU one of the few campuses in the country to have a Spanish TV news program. The program broadcasts live every Sunday at 5:00 pm.

In 2009, CitrusTV's morning show, Juice and Java, was introduced. This show has a similar format to ABC's Good Morning America or NBC's Today show.

In the fall of 2013, a political show Talking Points was introduced. The show features two co-anchors with a rotating team of political analysts covering the latest news in local, state, and national politics.

In the spring of 2023, an economic news show Market Shares was introduced, covering the stock market and major events in finance and business.

In the fall of 2025, CitrusTV Investigates was introduced. The show is series of pre-taped investigative news specials focused on issues impacting both the Syracuse community and university. The pilot was released in November 2025, with regular production beginning in spring 2026.

=== Operations ===
The Operations Department keeps the station equipment and facilities in order, takes care of repairs, and requests the purchase of new equipment. Operations oversees all engineering and computer/networking functions of CitrusTV.

=== Sports ===
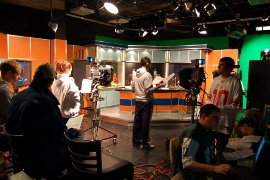
The CitrusTV studio during a taping of a sports show during the fall 2008 semester.

The CitrusTV Sports Department covers all SU athletics with five regular shows. On the Bench is a weekly sports-themed newscast, modeled after ESPN's SportsCenter. It is the longest-running collegiate sports program in the country and was founded by current CBS College Sports Announcer Dave Ryan. 'Cuse Countdown is a pre-game show for football, men's basketball, and men's lacrosse. Cuse Countdown and On the Bench both air on Spectrum Sports and the Orange Television Network. The relationship with Time Warner Cable (now Charter Spectrum) began in 2004. In 2005, Orange Press Pass was introduced, and is the only live post-game show in Syracuse, N.Y. for the major sports. In 2018, the sports department added No Pulp to its lineup. The program functions as a debate show and focuses on NCAA teams and storylines outside of Syracuse University.

In 2002, On The Bench aired its first remote preview show from the Carrier Dome focused on lacrosse. The show has become a station staple along with the Men's Basketball Preview Show, which began in 2003.

The Sports Department used to collaborate with the Orange Television Network and SU Athletics to produce live play-by-play shows of non-revenue athletic events on a show called SUper Sports.

In 2004 and in 2005, the sports department won three student Emmys.

In 2009 both On the Bench and 'Cuse Countdown were nominated and in the final "Blue Ribbon" round of the College Television Awards (the "College Emmys"), run by the Academy of Television Arts and Sciences.

The Sports Department sends student reporters to every home and away Syracuse Men's football, basketball, and lacrosse game. This included extensive coverage of the Orange's run to 2016 Final Four.

== Shows ==
=== Current ===
The following shows are currently being produced by CitrusTV:

- News
  - CitrusTV News Live at 6
  - CitrusTV Noticias en español (spring 2008 to present)
  - Juice & Java (spring 2009 to present)
  - Talking Points (fall 2013 to present)
  - CitrusTV NOW (spring 2018 to present)
  - Market Shares (spring 2023 to present)
  - CitrusTV Investigates (spring 2026 to present)
- Sports
  - On the Bench
  - Orange Press Pass (fall 2005 to present)
  - 'Cuse Countdown (spring 2006 to present)
  - No Pulp (spring 2019 to present)
  - Beat the Bookie (fall 2019 to present)
- Entertainment
  - Syracuse After Hours
  - College Eats (spring 2013 to present)
  - Unpeeled (fall 2013 to present)
  - The University News Cycle (fall 2019 to present)
  - 'Cuse Tonight (fall 2021 to present)

=== Past ===
The following shows have been produced by the station but are no longer in production:

- News
  - Campus 7 News
  - On Point (2005)
  - CounterPoint (2004, a pilot that produced live presidential election coverage in 2004.)
  - Syracuse Gameday
  - SUN (Syracuse University News)
  - SunUp
  - SA Today
  - OrangeZest
- Sports
  - Sideline/Courtside (Sideline was also briefly known as 4Downs.)
  - Sportsrap (until 2007?)
  - SUper Sports (until 2012)
- Entertainment
  - The Bio-Answer Show
  - Coast to Coast
  - Float Your Boat
  - Hardcore Sexton
  - Behind The 8 Ball (1987–1989)
  - Lower Learning (2002–2005)
  - Newswatch (1977–1984)
  - Take It Off! (1984–1985)
  - Null & Void (1987–2006)
  - Over The Hill
  - The Rhythm
  - SunDown
  - Syrafeud
  - Syracuse Live
  - Syracuse Stories
  - SyraQuiz
  - To the Batcave
  - Uncle Bobo's World of Fun (1990–1992)

== Notable alumni ==
  - Bob Costas, NBC Sports Anchor
  - Matthew Berry, ESPN fantasy sports expert
  - Steve Bunin, ESPN anchor
  - Rob Edwards, co-writer of The Princess and the Frog and producer of several TV shows
  - Jeff Rossen, Hearst Television reporter
  - Dave Ryan, CBS and former ESPN sportscaster
  - Danny Zuker, Emmy-winning co-executive producer and writer of Modern Family and several other shows
  - Mike Tirico, NBC Sports host and Sunday Night Football play-by-play announcer
  - David Highfield, KDKA-TV Pittsburgh anchor and host
  - Mike Konner, MLB Network
  - Derrin Horton, KTLA sports anchor
  - Kevin Maher, News12 Long Island
  - Jason Horowitz, Radio play-by-play voice of the Las Vegas Raiders
  - Matt Lincoln, WPEC sports director and news anchor
  - Angelo Di Carlo, WNDU-TV Sports
  - Matt Maisel, Director of Communications for the City of Harrisburg
  - Sal Maneen, formerly WSYR-TV Sports
  - Ben Freidfield, MLB Network
  - Rich Kiss, Assistant News Director CBS Philadelphia (KYW-TV)
  - Matt Rivers, ABC News Mexico City correspondent
  - Ryan Balton, Emmy-winning jib and Steadicam operator
  - David Resnick, Play-by-play voice of the Westchester Knicks
  - Ali Bauman, WCBS-TV New York reporter
  - Brian Cheung, NBC News business and data reporter
  - Jay Alter, ESPN play-by-play announcer
  - Noah Eagle, Radio play-by-play voice of the Los Angeles Clippers
  - Drew Carter, ESPN play-by-play announcer and studio host
