= WAER =

Radio station in Syracuse, New York, United States

- Syracuse, New York; United States
- Broadcast area: Central New York
- Frequency: 88.3 MHz (HD Radio)
- Branding: WAER 88.3 FM

Programming
- Language: English
- Format: Jazz/News/Sports
- Subchannels: HD2: Jazz 88
- Affiliations: NPR

Ownership
- Owner: Syracuse University
- Sister stations: WERW, WJPZ-FM

History
- First air date: April 1, 1947
- Call sign meaning: Alpha Epsilon Rho

Technical information
- Licensing authority: FCC
- Facility ID: 64354
- Class: B
- ERP: 50,000 watts
- HAAT: 84 meters (276 ft)
- Transmitter coordinates: 43°02′12″N 76°07′41″W

Links
- Public license information: Public file; LMS
- Webcast: Listen live; Listen live (via TuneIn)
- Website: waer.org

WAER (88.3 FM) is a radio station in Syracuse, New York. Its studios are located inside Haft Hall on Ostrom Avenue, and its transmitter is located atop Day Hall on One Mount Olympus Drive, both on the campus of Syracuse University, and is a part of the S. I. Newhouse School of Public Communications. The station features a jazz music and National Public Radio format, with a news, Syracuse Orange play-by-play, and music staff providing programming around the clock.

It is best known for its sports staff, which has produced the likes of Bob Costas, Mike Tirico, Nick Wright, and many others. Lou Reed also hosted a free-format show on WAER during his time at Syracuse University; this free-format radio tradition at Syracuse is carried on by WERW. Other alums include Ted Koppel, Jerry Stiller and Dick Clark. The station is managed by full-time professional staff and employs as many as 50 students each semester.

== History ==
Radio programming began on the university campus as early as 1931, the year when AM station WSYR-WMAC in Syracuse built its new transmitter site on the university campus. This station employed the WMAC call sign only when it carried Syracuse University programming originating from Crouse College. In late 1933 the call sign was changed to WSYR-WSYU, with WSYU, being used when broadcasting the university programs. In 1940, the use of dual callsigns was ended, and this station became just WSYR.

On April 1, 1947, an experimental low-powered educational FM station began broadcast on 88.1 MHz as WJIV-FM, primarily as a practical workshop for SU radio students, becoming first class D educational station in the nation. After three months, a license renewal from the FCC allowed the students to change the call sign letters to WAER (W Alpha Epsilon Rho), referring to the radio honorary society). The call sign was also interpreted as Always Excellent Radio. The studios, financial supported by General Electric, were located at Radio House, a set of prefabricated houses near the steps to Mount Olympus, immediately south of Carnegie Library. GE provided the setup, valued at $150,000 in 1948, and asked Syracuse university to experiment with this type of transmitter, in hopes of pioneering educational broadcasting by using the low-powered FM transmitters.

The enterprise was overseen by the dean of Radio department Kenneth G. Bartlett and professor Lawrence Myers Jr. served as the faculty manager. Student staff was soon appointed to create schedule of broadcast. The broadcasts included classical music, sports, news, religious programs from the Hendricks Chapel, immediate university news, student activities, as well as official university events. The station operated from 4 to 10 p.m. to avoid lecture hours.

When it began in 1947, WAER was authorized an effective radiated power of only 2.5 watts, but in 1951 the FCC granted an increase in power to 1,000 watts. The station began broadcasting seven hours a day, seven days a week, and became Syracuse University's permanent radio station. By 1984, the station’s effective radiated power was 6,000 watts. The station had moved to the then newly-built Newhouse II building by the seventies.

Up until 1983, WAER was student-run, but in a controversial decision in 1983, SU took over WAER and hired full-time professionals to run operations and train students.

Former logo

In 2017, a full-length documentary titled "The Miracle Microphone: The Impossible History and History Makers of WAER Radio" chronicled the 70-year history of WAER. The documentary was researched and produced by Scott MacFarlane and Keith Kobland and won New York state AP Press Association award in 2019.

Formerly a component of the auxiliary services department, the station became part of the S. I. Newhouse School of Public Communications in July 2021. The station continues to be housed at Haft Hall, 795 Ostrom Ave, where it has been located since 2003.

== Programming ==
The station programming includes jazz music, NPR programming, news, Syracuse Orange play-by-play, and special reporting projects.

=== Sports ===
The WAER sports staff is made up entirely of students, who report on home and away games. It provides daily sports updates as well as play-by-play for Syracuse University football, men's basketball, and men's lacrosse. A pregame show begins 30 minutes before each broadcast (Countdown to Kickoff, Tipoff, or Faceoff) with a halftime segment (Orange at the Half) and a postgame wrap-up (Orange Overtime). The Double Overtime, a full-length postgame talk show, airs after every football, basketball, and lacrosse game. Sports Nite airs weekly on Friday nights.

=== Music ===
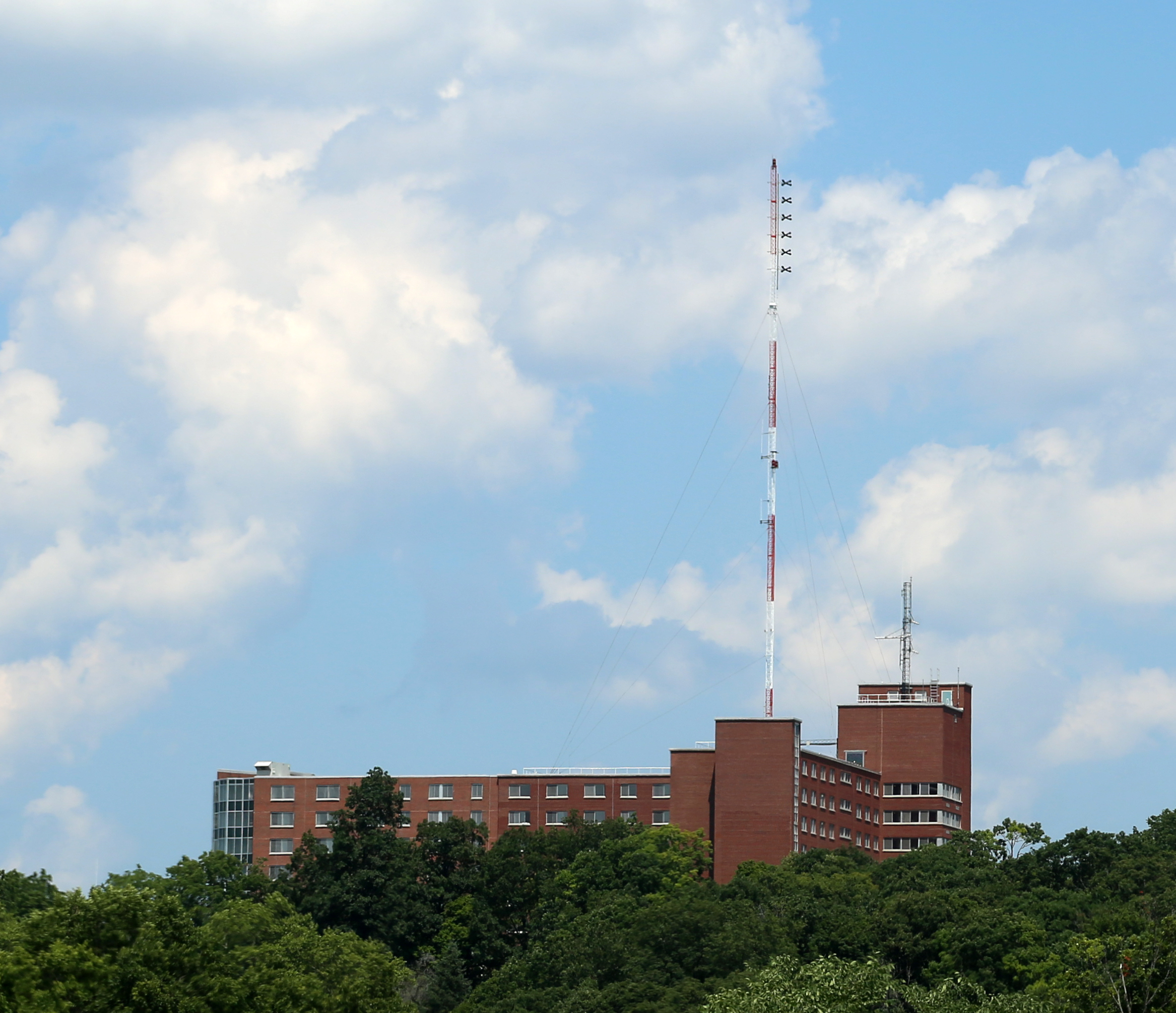
The WAER/88.3 transmitter, atop Day Hall.

The music department is organized by Eric Cohen, multiple-time winner of National Jazz Programmer of the Year. Larry Hoyt is the longtime voice of Common Threads on WAER. Cora Thomas is the office supervisor and runs gospel music programming.

== Partnership with WERW ==
Since February 2010, WAER has partnered with Syracuse University's WERW 1570 (later 1670). WERW is a student-run, free-format station, which returned to the air in 2017 after six years of only being available through iTunes radio. The partnership has resulted in a weekly, 3-hour show, called Real College Radio on WAER, which is hosted by alternating reps of a select cohort of WERW DJs. The genre is adult album alternative (AAA), and each DJ brings their own new flavor to the WAER offerings.

== Alumni ==
- Marv Albert, "the voice of basketball", the voice of the New York Knicks (1967–2004), WAER Hall of Fame Inductee (2017)
- Jason Benetti, television play-by-play announcer for Detroit Tigers baseball and Fox Sports
- Len Berman, eight-time, Emmy Award-winning Sports-Anchor for WNBC-TV in New York City, WAER Hall of Fame Inductee (2018)
- Carter Blackburn, football sportscaster for CBS Sports
- Tony Caridi, play-by-play voice of the West Virginia Mountaineers, WAER Hall of Fame inductee (2023)
- Kevin Brown, play-by-play announcer for the Baltimore Orioles and ESPN
- Joe Castiglione, radio play-by-play announcer for the Boston Red Sox
- Andrew Catalon, announcer for NFL on CBS, PGA Tour on CBS, College Basketball on CBS, and NCAA March Madness.
- Dick Clark, radio and television personality
- Bob Costas, prime-time host of 11 Olympic Games from 1992 until 2016 for NBC Sports, WAER Hall of Fame Inductee (2015)
- Ian Eagle, play-by-play announcer for the Brooklyn Nets on the YES network, NFL on CBS and College Basketball on CBS, WAER Hall of Fame Inductee (2013)
- Noah Eagle, play-by-play announcer for NBC Sports
- Steve Gelbs, reporter for SNY
- Hank Greenwald, play-by-play announcer for the San Francisco Giants, WAER Hall of Fame Inductee
- Scott Hanson, host of NFL RedZone and reporter for NFL Network
- Brian Higgins, radio and television sportscaster working for the SU athletic department, the Syracuse IMG sports network and Time Warner Cable sports
- Todd Kalas, television play-by-play announcer for Houston Astros baseball
- Steve Kroft, journalist & long-time correspondent for 60 Minutes, WAER Hall of Fame Inductee (2018)
- Ted Koppel, anchor for Nightline (1980–2005) first inductee of the WAER Hall of Fame (2012)
- Ed Levine of Galaxy Media Company, WAER Hall of Fame Inductee (2017)
- Sean McDonough, sportscaster currently employed by ESPN and Boston Red Sox Radio Network, WAER Hall of Fame Inductee (2014)
- Beth Mowins, play-by-play announcer and sports journalist for ESPN and CBS
- Andy Musser, play-by-play announcer for Philadelphia Phillies baseball from 1976-2001, WAER Hall of Fame Inductee
- Dave O'Brien, lead play-by-play announcer on the New England Sports Network (NESN)
- Greg Papa, radio play-by-play announcer for many Oakland & San Francisco pro-teams, WAER Hall of Fame inductee (2025)
- Dave Pasch, radio play-by-play voice of the Arizona Cardinals and ESPN announcer
- Cory Provus, radio voice of the Minnesota Twins
- Lou Reed, musician, singer, songwriter
- Bill Roth, play-by-play voice of Virginia Tech Hokies football and men's basketball (1988–2015), WAER Hall of Fame Inductee (2014)
- Adam Schein, radio host on SiriusXM since 2004
- Andrew Siciliano, sports television anchor, reporter and radio broadcaster, WAER Hall of Fame inductee (2025)
- Lakshmi Singh, national midday newscaster for NPR, WAER Hall of Fame Inductee
- Bill Spaulding, play-by-play announcer for the New Jersey Devils
- Jerry Stiller, comedian, actor, and author known for his roles in Seinfeld and King of Queens
- Dick Stockton, play-by-play announcer for NFL on Fox Sports
- Mike Tirico, NBC Olympics host and Sunday Night Football play-by-play, former ESPN personality, WAER Hall of Fame Inductee (2014)
- Nick Wright, sports talk personality for Fox Sports 1

== See also ==
- WJPZ
- The Daily Orange
- CitrusTV
- WERW (student radio)
