= Bill Spaulding (sportscaster) =

American sports announcer

Bill Spaulding (born c. 1991) is an American sports announcer. He is the former play-by-play announcer for the New Jersey Devils and has announced for the Ivy League Digital Network as well as other college sports events on NBC and ESPN, including the Olympic Games.

== Biography ==
Spaulding grew up in Horseheads, New York. he went to Notre Dame High School in Elmira, New York, where he graduated before going to Syracuse University. While studying at the S. I. Newhouse School of Public Communications at Syracuse, Spaulding worked as a sports director for WAER and also hosted a talk-show as well as play-by-play announcing for high school and women's college sports at WJPZ-FM. During the summer months, Spaulding also did commentary for collegiate summer baseball games with the Wareham Gatemen of the Cape Cod Baseball League and the Geneva Red Wings of the New York Collegiate Baseball League. He won the Jim Nantz Award for outstanding sportscaster in 2012.

After graduating from Syracuse in 2013, he became a play-by-play announcer for the Dayton Dragons minor league baseball team and eventually joined the Ivy League Digital Network where he did play-by-play commentary for Harvard and Northwestern University.

Spaulding worked as a play-by-play announcer for college hockey games as well as the Olympic Games for NBC Sports starting with the 2016 Summer Olympics as well as the 2018 Winter Olympics and 2020 Summer Olympics. Much of his commentary with NBC Sports during the Olympics include track-and-field, speed skating, ski jumping, and others.

On August 11, 2022, the MSG Network announced that Spaulding would join the network as a play-by-play announcer for the New Jersey Devils, replacing the outgoing Steve Cangialosi who did play-by-play for the Devils for eleven seasons. He left the Devils after the 2024-25 season and was replaced by Don La Greca.
