= Scott MacFarlane (journalist) =

American journalist (active starting 1996)

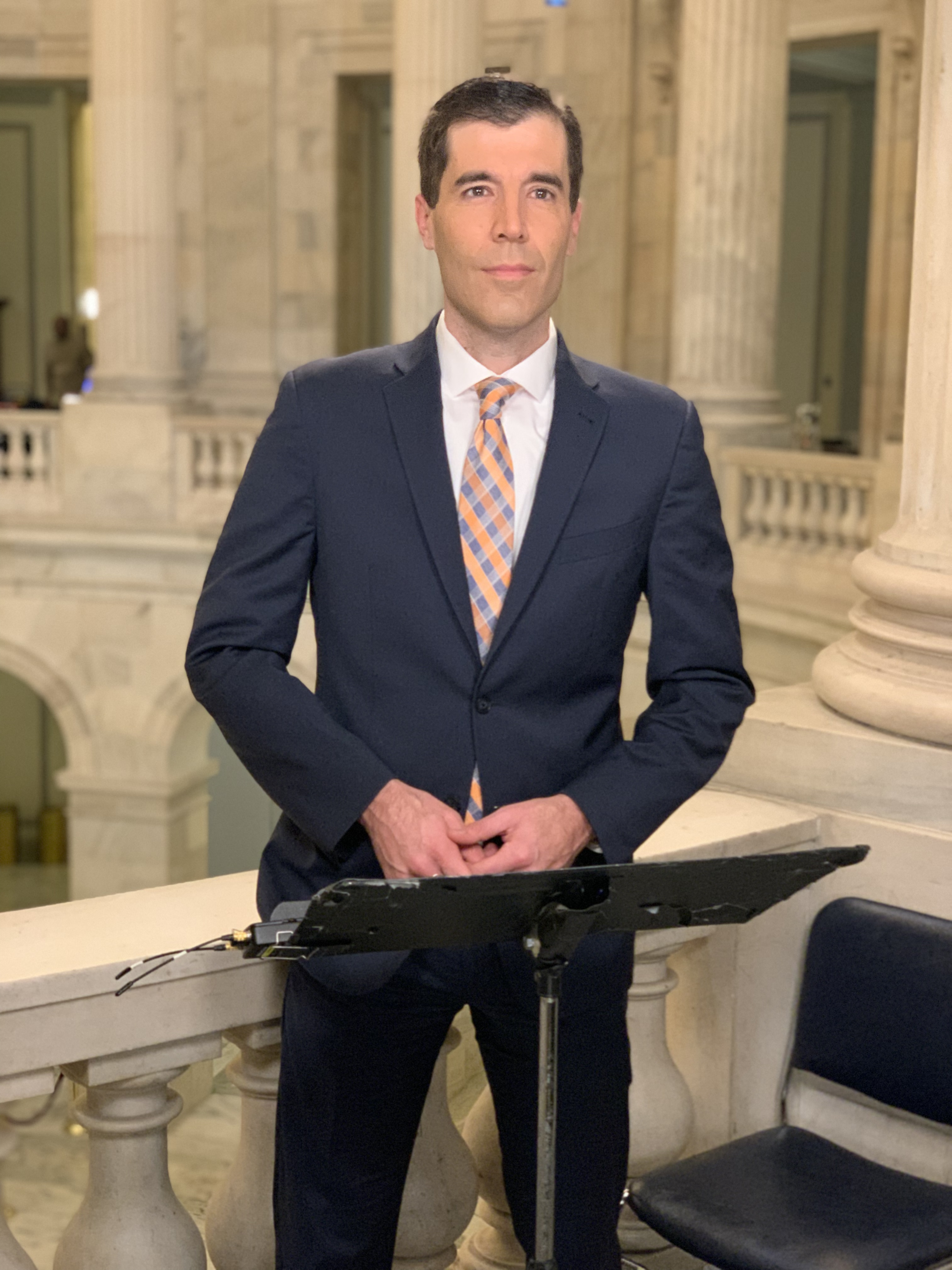
- Scott MacFarlane at the U.S. Capitol
- Born: Scott John MacFarlane; September 18, 1976 (age 49); Highland, New York, U.S.
- Education: Syracuse University
- Occupations: journalist, investigative reporter
- Years active: 1996–present
- Employer: MeidasTouch
- Notable work: CBS Mornings; CBS Evening News; CBS Saturday Morning; Face the Nation; CBS News 24/7; CBS Radio
- Spouse: Lisa Hines
- Children: 2

Scott MacFarlane is an American investigative journalist and broadcaster who is chief Washington correspondent and anchor at MeidasTouch. He worked previously for CBS News as a justice correspondent and at NBC Washington as an investigative reporter.

MacFarlane is based in Washington, D.C. and his reports appeared on all platforms, including CBS Mornings, the CBS Evening News, CBS Saturday Morning, Face the Nation, CBS News 24/7, CBS Radio and in daily reports with major CBS TV and radio affiliates.

He previously worked as an investigative reporter at WRC-TV, a local NBC affiliate in Washington, D.C. Prior to that he was a Congressional correspondent for the Cox-TV network.

MacFarlane emerged on the national scene during his coverage of the prosecutions following the January 6, 2021, attack on the US Capitol.

== Early life and education ==
MacFarlane grew up in Highland, New York, near Poughkeepsie and attended Highland High School. In a 2023 CBS Mornings report about high school academic challenge competitions, a high school-era clip of MacFarlane from Highland, New York, was spotlighted.

MacFarlane graduated summa cum laude from Syracuse University’s S. I. Newhouse School of Public Communications in 1998. He majored in broadcast journalism and political philosophy. During his undergraduate years, he worked at WJPZ and WAER FM stations on campus. MacFarlane was later named to both of their radio Halls of Fame.

== Career ==
Scott hosts “Scott MacFarlane Reports” on YouTube and contributes to a nationwide radio network of affiliates. He’s also a frequent panelist on cable news and is editor of the “DAY AHEAD” editorial note in Washington.

He contributes to all shows and platforms on Meidas Touch Network, where he serves as Chief Washington Correspondent and anchor

From 2021-26, MacFarlane covered Congress, politics and federal criminal cases for CBS News. MacFarlane was the CBS correspondent who reported on the assassination attempt of Donald Trump on July 13, 2024 in Butler, Pennsylvania. His reporting detailed how he and others at the rally sought cover beneath press scaffolding.

MacFarlane was an in-studio correspondent for the network’s coverage of election nights and breaking news. He was the inside-the-Chamber correspondent for the network's coverage of State of the Union addresses. Scott reported from inside the courtroom during Trump legal cases, covered Presidential and US House campaigns and reported on Congressional leadership races.

He was a substitute anchor for the CBS Weekend News

MacFarlane was a regular contributor to CBS radio affiliates and CBS Television stations, including WCBS-TV in New York, KYW (AM) radio in Philadelphia, WTOP-FM radio in Washington, WTMJ (AM) radio in Milwaukee, WJZ-TV in Baltimore and KNX (AM) radio in Los Angeles.

MacFarlane's career began as a reporter at WTVH-TV in Syracuse, New York. He also worked at WKIP in Poughkeepsie, WSYR (AM) and WYYY radio in Syracuse, WWMT in Michigan and at WKBD/WWJ-TV in Detroit.

He previously worked in D.C. as a correspondent at Cox-TV, a contributor for Sirius XM radio and WRC-TV, a local NBC affiliate. He worked at WRC-TV for eight years, focusing on several investigations into veterans' healthcare and school safety, which led to new state laws in Virginia and Maryland. He joined Cox media in 2005. He was named congressional correspondent for CBS News in December 2021.

MacFarlane has prominently covered the aftermath of the January 6 U.S. Capitol attack, reporting on more than 1,500 criminal cases from the attack.

In a 2023 special report on CBS News, McFarlane broke the news of federal criminal charges against Donald Trump regarding the 2020 presidential election.

At WRC-TV in 2020, he founded and produced a news program for children called "News 4 Kids".

In 2017, MacFarlane produced a full-length documentary titled The Miracle Microphone: The Impossible History and History Makers of WAER Radio chronicling the 70-year history of WAER-FM on Syracuse University campus. The documentary won New York state AP Press Association award in 2019.

McFarlane worked at WKIP and WRNQ radio in Poughkeepsie, NY while in high school. He was also an R&B disc jockey at WJPZ radio in Syracuse.

On March 9, 2026, MacFarlane said that he would leave CBS voluntarily amidst a shakeup following the sale of the network to Skydance and the installation of Bari Weiss as head of CBS News. Two weeks later he became the Chief Washington Correspondent and anchor for the MeidasTouch Network. He stated that the move allowed him a platform for "independent, unfiltered reporting" without the constraints of traditional television production. He is slated to host his own program, Scott MacFarlane Reports, focusing on the intersection of politics, law, and democracy.

== Recognition ==
MacFarlane has won over 20 regional Emmy and Edward R. Murrow Awards.

He won the Anna Quindlen Award from the Child Welfare League of America for his reporting on school security and teacher licensing.

In 2001, MacFarlane earned the Wade H. McCree award for excellence in reporting on the justice system while working at the WKBD/WWJ-TV in Detroit. In 1999, he won first place in the national William Randolph Hearst Broadcast News Competition.

He was inducted into the WJPZ Hall of Fame and the WAER Hall of Fame in 2017.

== Personal life ==
MacFarlane is married to Lisa, whom he met on the first day of college at Syracuse. The couple has two sons.
