= WERW (student radio) =

Student radio station in Syracuse, New York

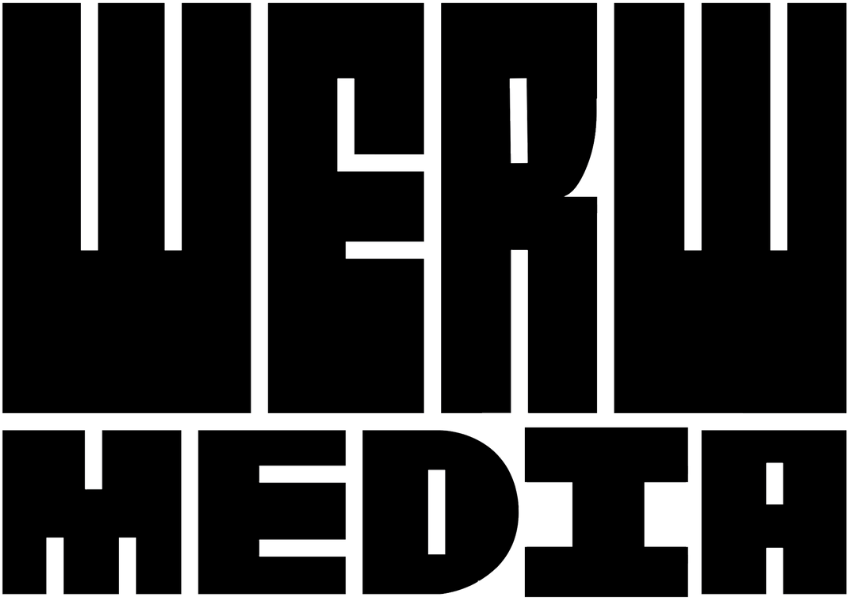
- Syracuse, New York; United States
- Frequency: 1670 kHz

Programming
- Format: Freeform

Ownership
- Owner: Syracuse University
- Sister stations: WJPZ-FM, WAER

History
- First air date: February 2, 1985
- Call sign meaning: WE aRe University Union (original); What Everyone Really Wants (2010 – present)

Technical information
- Transmitter coordinates: 43°2′24.8″N 76°8′7.0″W

Links
- Website: werwradio.org

WERW (1670 AM) is an independent student-run, free-format radio station at Syracuse University that broadcasts on the Web. The station programs an eclectic format similar to many other college radio stations in the United States, with blocks of programs featuring underground rock music, world music, folk music, occasional news, and some political or public affairs programs. The online station can be streamed at its website.

== History ==
The station was formed by the largest student-run organization on campus, University Union, after a controversy involving the other student-run station, WJPZ-FM. WJPZ had incorporated as an independent entity broadcasting Top 40 music in a simulation of a professional radio station, in order to provide communications students attending the S.I. Newhouse School of Public Communications with vocational training. It started, unlike WERW, as a low-power AM station with 100 milliwatts on 1200 AM with its antenna atop Day Hall, but later began broadcasting with a Federal Communications Commission issued license utilizing 100 watts on 89.1 FM on February 2, 1985. WJPZ did find some favor among students at Syracuse University and amongst Top 40 fans in the surrounding community that could hear it. However, there were protests among many university students who wanted the station to reflect more "diverse" programming, including a three-day sit-in at the station's studios by the Student Afro-American Society in the autumn of 1986.

The station was originally conceived in October 1986. University Union Concert Board Director Fred Feldman Creative Board Director Will Morrison and UU member Kevin Baier hatched the idea for an alternative radio station to exist under the University Union umbrella. They joined forces with SU freshmen Pete Wesenberg, Kyle Rosa, and Shane Francis, who also wanted to start a radio station. Baier became the station's first General Manager and Lori Teitler the first music director. The original turntables and records were those of the University Union members and its free-form format initially consisted of indie rock, rap and alternative dance music.

In response to the student complaints, and with the new team in place, the University Union organization established WERW in January 1987. University Union is commonly referred to as "U.U." and the station call letters, WERW, were chosen as shorthand for "We Are U.U.". During its first year, WERW broadcast out of the control room of CitrusTV (then UUTV) for a limited broadcasting schedule, and was heard only on cable television (WJPZ earlier had a similar arrangement). University Union secured just enough funding for turntables, a mixing console and other basic broadcast necessities and WERW moved into a "real" studio over the summer of 1987 in Watson Hall just across the hall from WJPZ. The station was originally heard only through television monitors and over low-power FM. By the early 1990s, WERW operated via carrier current on 750 AM and was available in Syracuse University's dorms and some other campus buildings.

A low-power AM broadcast transmitter was acquired and an antenna was erected atop Booth Hall in 1995 to allow WERW to broadcast with 20 watts of power on 1570 AM while simulcasting on 750 AM. It could then be heard all across campus at the Syracuse University and in adjacent areas of the city of Syracuse.

By the late 1990s, the carrier current broadcast on 750 AM had been abandoned. WERW began to simulcast its programming on the Web in early 2001. A few years later, the 1570 AM transmitter began to broadcast a dead carrier signal when the cable that ran from the studio to the transmitter was cut or damaged from corrosion.

In 2002, WERW released an album of music from local artists in conjunction with the campus record label.

In early 2010, WERW split from University Union and became an independent student organization. "What Everyone Really Wants" began to be used as an alternate meaning for the call sign instead of the original meaning of "We Are U.U." In October 2010, the station relaunched and began to broadcast from its new facilities in the basement of the Schine Student Center in the Jabberwocky Cafe.

The AM transmitter was removed from the air in early 2011. In 2017, WERW returned to the airwaves on AM 1670 with a campus-only signal, but remains available online.

== Notable WERW alumni ==
- Ariel Helwani (sports host, 2000–2004)
- Sam Roberts (DJ, 2002–2006)
