= Andrew Catalon =

American sportscaster (born 1980)

- Born: September 7, 1979 (age 47); Millburn, New Jersey U.S.
- Education: Syracuse University
- Occupation: Sports commentator
- Years active: 2001–present
- Spouse: Jessica Layton
- Children: 1
- Sports commentary career
- Genre: Play-by-play
- Sports: NFL, PGA Tour, College Basketball, NCAA March Madness
- Employer: CBS Sports (2013–present)

Andrew Catalon (born September 7, 1979) is an American sportscaster. He has announced NFL on CBS, PGA Tour on CBS, College Basketball on CBS, WNBA on CBS and NCAA March Madness.

== Early life and education ==
Catalon grew up in the Short Hills section of Millburn, New Jersey and graduated in 1997 from Millburn High School. He attended the S. I. Newhouse School of Public Communications at Syracuse University, graduating in 2001. At Syracuse, he worked for WAER-FM.

== Career ==
Catalon was the sports director at WVNY until its news department was shuttered in September 2003 due to financial troubles. He joined WNYT as the weekend sports anchor three months later in December. He eventually was the station's primary sports anchor until his requested demotion to part-time status was granted in December 2012. By then, he had play-by-play basketball assignments with the UConn Huskies women's team for SNY and the Mountain West Conference on CBS Sports Network. He also freelanced at WFAN before joining CBS Sports Network on a full-time basis after his departure from WNYT on July 19, 2013. Beginning in 2011, Catalon became a play-by-play announcer for the NFL on CBS. Catalon served as a tennis play-by-play announcer for the 2016 Olympic Games and has called the Masters Tournament and PGA Championship in golf.

In 2022, he was inducted into Syracuse University's WAER Hall of Fame.

== Personal life ==
Catalon lives in New Jersey with his wife, Jessica Layton, who is a news reporter for MSNBC. They have a son, CJ.
