= Jay Jacobs (broadcaster) =

American basketball broadcaster

Jules "Jay" Jacobs Jr. (born June 18, 1938, in Morgantown, West Virginia, United States) is a retired public school administrator and radio color analyst with Tony Caridi for West Virginia University's Mountaineer Sports Network basketball coverage. His parents, Jules and Helen Jacobs raised him in Morgantown with his two sisters, Jennifer and Judie. He attended the Little Red Schoolhouse, Morgantown Junior High and Morgantown High School.

== Playing career ==
He played guard on Morgantown High’s 1956 team that finished as state runner up. He had 38 points and he fouled out in the third quarter of the semi-finals. The Mohigans played against fellow rival and future teammate Jerry West’s East Bank team. He was named all state for the second time in his high school career. Jay graduated from Morgantown High in 1956 and went on to attend West Virginia University as a Physical Education Major. He played basketball for WVU along with Jerry West and Willie Akers. The three of them were on the freshman team that was coached by the late Quentin Barnette. They finished the season with a 36–0 record. Perhaps some of the most talented recruits of their time. “In 1958, we went 26–1, won the Southern Conference championship and finished No. 1 in the Associated Press poll. If Don Vincent hadn’t broken his leg in the league tournament, that team probably would have won the NCAA title.” Commented Jay. The Mountaineers were beaten by Manhattan 89–84 in the first round of the NCAA tournament held at Madison Square Garden. That squad went on to make great strides for the Mountaineers. Jacobs, who sprained his ankle badly his junior year didn't play as much but has fond memories of the team led by West.

== Coaching career ==
After graduating from WVU Jay took the head basketball coaching position at Benwood Union High. He coached for four years there before the Marshall County schools were consolidated. Jay then moved he and his wife Bonnie and their daughter, Lisa, to Frederick, Maryland where he coached basketball at Thomas Johnson High School. He taught physical education and served as the athletic director.

== Broadcasting career ==
He retired from coaching, but that only allowed him to pick up his love for basketball in a new area: color commentating. Jacobs spent 18 seasons as basketball analyst on MSN-TV and worked through the years with play-by-play announcers: Jack Fleming, Woody O'Hara and Tony Caridi. He has made the trip from his home in Walkersville to Morgantown to do basketball games more times than he can count. He worked continuously for the university and MSN providing color analysis on the radio with Tony Caridi as they cover the men's basketball games. On October 25, 2023, Jacobs announced his retirement from broadcasting. WVU gave recognition to Jacobs' service as both player and broadcaster on December 1, 2023 game, which was supposedly his final broadcast. He stayed on until he officially signed off on February 3, 2024.

== Trivia ==
Jay and his wife Bonnie (married in 1963) have two children, John and Lisa and four grandchildren. They all live near Frederick, Maryland. He continues to follow WVU basketball and travels with the team giving expert analysis and plenty of laughs to those he crosses paths with. He is also interviewed on ESPN's SportsCentury about Jerry West.
