= Jack Eagle =

American actor (1926–2008)

- Born: January 15, 1926; Brooklyn, New York, U.S.
- Died: January 10, 2008 (aged 81); New York City, U.S.
- Occupations: Television, film actor
- Spouse: Monica Eagle
- Children: Ian Eagle
- Relatives: Noah Eagle (grandson)

Jack Eagle (January 15, 1926 – January 10, 2008) was an American actor. He was best known for his work in television commercials, including his role as Brother Dominic in a Super Bowl commercial for Xerox.

Eagle was born into a Jewish family in Brooklyn, New York, on January 15, 1926. He initially worked as a trumpet player during the big-band era, and began working in commercials during the early 1960s. Eagle was working as a comedian in the Borscht Belt when he made the first Xerox commercial as Brother Dominic, which first aired during Super Bowl IX.

More commercials followed; Brother Dominic became the company's mascot, and Eagle said in 1978 that he had made more money from commercials in the previous two years than he had in his entire career. He signed a three-year contract to promote Xerox in person to customers and its employees. Other notable commercial roles included "Mr. Cholesterol" in commercials for Fleischmann's margarine during the 1970s.

Jack Eagle's son is sportscaster Ian Eagle and his grandson is sportscaster Noah Eagle. Jack Eagle died in New York City on January 10, 2008, at the age of 81.
