= Cory Provus =

American sportscaster (born 1978)

- Born: July 7, 1978 (age 48)
- Education: Syracuse University
- Occupation: Sports broadcaster
- Years active: 2000–present
- Employer: Minnesota Twins
- Known for: Play-by-play announcer
- Spouse: Dana Provus
- Children: 2
- Relatives: Brad Sham (cousin)

Cory Provus (born July 7, 1978) is a sports television and radio broadcaster. As of the 2024 season, he is the play-by-play voice of the Minnesota Twins on television, replacing Dick Bremer.

== Early life and education ==
Provus grew up in Highland Park, Illinois. He graduated from Syracuse University's S. I. Newhouse School of Public Communications in 2000. Working at WAER-FM at SU campus, he did play by play and studio hosting for the Syracuse Orange sports. While at Syracuse, he called baseball games for minor-league Auburn of the New York–Penn League.

== Career ==
Provus began his career calling collegiate football, basketball, and baseball games for the Virginia Tech Hokies (2000-03), Georgia Tech Yellow Jackets, UAB Blazers (2006), and the Wake Forest Demon Deacons. Cory is a play-by-play announcer for a small package of Big Ten Network games and is a play-by-play announcer for college basketball on FOX.

He began his major league broadcasting career as the pregame/postgame host for radio broadcasts of the Chicago Cubs and backed up Pat Hughes. The Milwaukee Brewers then hired Provus in 2009, replacing Jim Powell who departed for a job with the Atlanta Braves, alongside Bob Uecker until 2012. Joe Block would replace him.

The Twins hired Provus to replace John Gordon who retired after the 2011 season.

The Twins hired Provus as the play-by-play voice for the television booth to replace Dick Bremer who retired after the 2023 season.

== Personal life ==
Provus lives in Minnetonka, Minnesota with his wife Dana; they have a son and daughter. Provus is Jewish. Dallas Cowboys sportscaster Brad Sham is his cousin.
