= Lakshmi Singh =

American journalist

- Born: c. 1972; Syracuse
- Alma mater: Syracuse University; Newhouse School of Public Communications
- Occupation: Radio personality, journalist
- Employer: NPR (2000–)

Lakshmi Singh (/ˈlækʃmiː ˈsɪŋ/ LAK-shmee) is an American journalist. She is the anchor of Midday for NPR Newscasts, which is one of the top three most downloaded podcasts in the United States.

== Early life ==
According to Singh, growing up, she struggled with shyness and stuttering. In high school, as she tried new activities and classes in forensics, debate, and drama, she says she began to find her voice with the encouragement of her teachers, leading to her interest in public speaking and journalism.

== Career ==
Singh graduated from S.I. Newhouse School Of Public Communications and Syracuse University in 1994 with a dual bachelor's degree in broadcasting & digital journalism and Latin American studies. Prior to her tenure at NPR, she worked at WAER in Syracuse, then NPR member stations KPBX (Spokane), WMFE (Orlando), and Washington DC's WAMU, where she was a reporter and local show host. She joined NPR's Newscast Unit in 2000. Singh's contributions cover a variety of topics including race, health, immigration policy, and the arts.

In addition to announcing news throughout the day, Singh's résumé includes field reporting, and contributing to NPR's Latino USA, The Christian Science Monitor, PRI, Voice of America and Gannett News Service. Singh has worked as a documentary producer and reporter for Soundprint Media, where she covered stories of women struggling with HIV/AIDS.

== Personal life ==
Singh's father is Indo-Trinidadian while her mother is Puerto Rican. Singh pronounces her first name as "LAK-shmee," not "LUK-shmee," as it is more traditionally pronounced. She prefers to follow the way her paternal Indo-Trinidadian grandmother said her name.

== Awards and recognition ==
Singh was inducted into the WAER Hall of Fame. In 2014, Singh was recognized by Women of Color in Communications for her "contributions to the field, mentorship to other women in communications and broad impact on the promotion of ethnic diversity in journalism." As a 1994 Syracuse University alumna with a dual degree in broadcast and digital journalism, Singh delivered the keynote address at the 2017 Newhouse School Convocation Ceremony. In 2018, "The Invention of Thanksgiving" - a radio report by Singh - was featured in the Trail of Tears gallery of the "Americans" exhibition at the Smithsonian's National Museum of the American Indian.
