= Adam Schein =

American sportscaster

- Education: Syracuse University
- Occupation: Sportscaster
- Years active: 2000–present
- Children: 3

Adam Schein is an American radio and TV sportscaster. He has worked for SiriusXM and CBS Sports Network.

== Education ==
Schein graduated from Syracuse University's Newhouse School of Public Communications in 1999, with a degree in broadcast journalism.

== Career ==
Schein has worked at WFAN (2001–2006), SiriusXM NFL Radio (2004–2012), WHEN (AM) Radio in Syracuse (1999–2002), and Foxsports.com (2005–2012). He won the John Bayliss Award for Excellence in Radio Journalism in 1998 and 1999.

Schein has been a radio host on SiriusXM since 2004. Schein hosts Schein on Sports weekdays on Mad Dog Sports Radio from 9 am – 12 pm EST.

In 2011, He hosted Loud Mouths with Chris Carlin on SNY weeknights at 5:30 Eastern Time. Schein was with SNY from 2006 to 2015 and was on SNY's Jets Post Game Live and Jets Nation on-air teams from 2006 to 2012.

Schein hosts Time to Schein weeknights at 6 pm EST on CBS Sports Network. He announced that show was ending February 2024. He became the host of That Other Pregame Show on CBS Sports Network in September 2013. He is also the host of NFL Monday QB on the CBS Sports Network with Phil Simms, Rich Gannon, Trent Green, and Steve Beuerlein, which launched in 2012. On March 10, 2026, Schein started hosting Schein Time weekdays at 2pm EST on the New York Post.

In August 2015, Schein was named the host of Inside the NFL on Showtime, working alongside Phil Simms, Boomer Esiason, and Brandon Marshall. He is also a columnist for NFL.com and has been with the website since 2012.

== Personal life ==
Schein and his wife Katie have three children.
