= Dave Pasch =

American sportscaster (born 1972)

- Born: August 11, 1972 (age 54); Madison, Wisconsin, U.S.
- Education: Syracuse University (1994)
- Years active: 1994–present
- Spouse: Hallie Pasch (m. 1996)
- Children: 3
- Sports commentary career
- Genre: Play-by-play
- Sports: NBA, College basketball, College football, NFL

Dave Pasch (born August 11, 1972) is an American ESPN announcer, covering the NBA, college football, and college basketball. He was also the radio play-by-play voice of the Arizona Cardinals.

== Personal life ==
Pasch grew up in Madison, Wisconsin, to parents Robert and Ina. Pasch grew up in a Reform Jewish home. Upon meeting his wife Hallie in 1994, he decided to explore, and ultimately convert to, Christianity. Pasch is also a believer of creationism and has stated on ESPN broadcast that he does not believe in evolution.

Pasch graduated from Madison Memorial High School in 1990. He then attended Syracuse University's S. I. Newhouse School of Public Communications, and was selected to do on-air work for WAER radio. He graduated in 1994.

== Broadcasting career ==
Pasch has worked for ESPN television since 2003, calling primarily the NBA, college football and college basketball. Pasch was also been the play-by-play announcer of the Arizona Cardinals from 2002 to 2025. Pasch was the voice of Syracuse Orange college football and basketball from 1999 to 2002. Pasch also did preseason TV for the Buffalo Bills in 2001, as well as NFL Europe for FOX. He also called select NFL games for FOX and Westwood One radio.

Pasch started calling college football in 2004, working with Rod Gilmore and Trevor Matich on Friday Night Football. In 2007, he moved to Saturday afternoons, working with Andre Ware. In 2009, he began working with Chris Spielman and Bob Griese. In 2011, he called games with Spielman and Urban Meyer, before Meyer took the Ohio State coaching job. Pasch started calling NBA games for ESPN in 2006, working with Tom Tolbert and Bill Walton. Pasch would later pair with Walton on college basketball for ESPN's Pac-12 coverage, starting in 2013. Pasch has worked with a variety of analysts on NBA and college basketball, including Jeff Van Gundy, Mark Jackson, Hubie Brown, Doug Collins, Jon Barry, PJ Carlesimo, Jay Bilas, Dick Vitale, Bill Raftery, and Doris Burke. Pasch also has worked the NCAA women's basketball tournament, Major League Baseball, the WNBA, the great outdoor games, and arena football for ESPN.

Before working with ESPN, Pasch worked for the West Virginia Radio Corporation for high school football; CBS Radio/Westwood One for golf, NFL, and college basketball tournaments; Fox Sports for NFL Europe and NFL; the Detroit Vipers; and the Chicago Blackhawks.
