= Dave Ryan (sportscaster) =

American sportscaster

Dave Ryan (born June 20, 1967) is an American play-by-play announcer and reporter for CBS, who has worked a wide variety of sports programming including NFL, college basketball, lacrosse, bowling, baseball and hockey.

== Education ==
Ryan graduated from Syracuse University's S. I. Newhouse School of Public Communications with a B.S. in Broadcast Journalism in 1989. He got his start in broadcasting at UUTV, now called CitrusTV, the student-run TV studio at Syracuse University. He is also Co-Director of Syracuse's Sportscaster U. program that instructs NBA players in broadcasting.

== Career ==
He previously worked for ESPN. He previously called Rochester Rattlers games on ESPN3 with Evan Washburn. He is mostly known for calling PBA bowling events on the network alongside color commentator Randy Pedersen from 2002–2007.

He called other non-marquee sporting events on ESPN and its sister networks, such as lacrosse and the semifinals of the Little League World Series. In addition, he occasionally serves as a college football sideline reporter and a college basketball announcer and served as a play-by-play man for ESPN/ESPN2 for 8 years. His signature phrases on bowling telecasts were "60 feet to success!" and "Those pins had no chance." Some bowling fans criticized him for calling pins by a number, such as "number seven" instead of saying "the seven pin." Ryan was replaced by Rob Stone for ESPN's PBA telecasts in 2007, but Ryan handled play-by-play for the handful of CBS Sports Network PBA telecasts. He also continued to fill in for Stone on occasion, while calling other bowling events, such as PWBA and college tournaments.

Ryan's name is on a fairly short list of national bowling play-by-play announcers, with Chris Schenkel being the most well known after he spent 36 years calling PBA events for ABC. Denny Schreiner (ESPN), Jay Randolph (NBC/ESPN2), Mike Durbin (ESPN), Dick Stockton (HBO) and Rob Stone (ESPN/ FOX) have also served as play-by-play announcers for bowling telecasts.

Ryan joined the NFL on CBS commentary team in 2009 as a play by play man, substituting for Gus Johnson in week 16.

On February 2, 2012, Ryan agreed to call Major League Lacrosse games on the CBS Sports Network with Evan Washburn. Ryan also returned to PBA bowling broadcasts in June–July 2013, when CBS Sports Network covered five events in the PBA Tour's "Summer Swing." He has continued to anchor many PBA and PWBA telecasts through the present day.

Ryan is the father of 7 children and lives in Florida
