= Noah Eagle =

American sportscaster (born 1996)

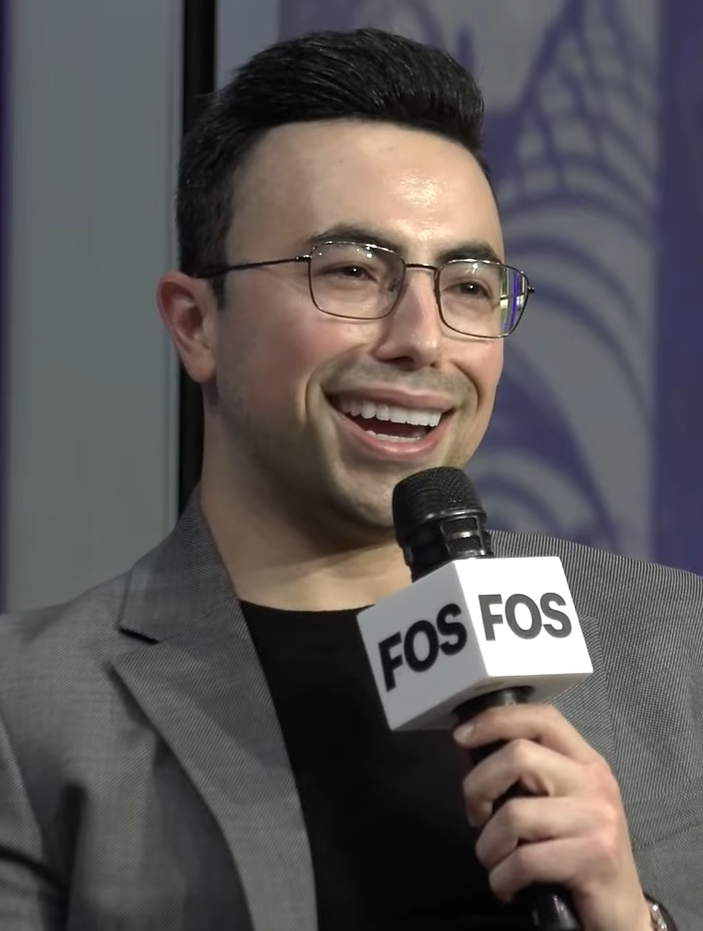
- Eagle in 2025
- Born: December 11, 1996 (age 29); Essex Fells, New Jersey, U.S.
- Education: Syracuse University
- Occupation: Sportscaster
- Employers: NBC Sports; Nickelodeon; Brooklyn Nets; Tennis Channel
- Father: Ian Eagle
- Relatives: Jack Eagle (grandfather)

Noah Eagle (born December 11, 1996) is an American sportscaster. The son of sportscaster Ian Eagle, he is a play-by-play broadcaster for NBC Sports, primarily calling football games, college basketball, National Basketball Association, and the Summer Olympic Games. He is also a play-by-play announcer for the Tennis Channel, Brooklyn Nets, and NFL games airing on Nickelodeon and Netflix.

Previously, Eagle was a play-by-play announcer for the French Open, CBS Sports, Fox Sports, and the Los Angeles Clippers.

== Early life ==
Growing up, Eagle intended to follow in his father Ian's footsteps and pursue a career in broadcasting. A basketball fan, Eagle would shadow his father when he called NBA games.

Raised in Essex Fells, New Jersey, Eagle graduated from West Essex High School in 2015 and attended Syracuse University’s S. I. Newhouse School of Public Communications, graduating in 2019. At Syracuse, he showed promise as a play-by-play announcer when calling the Orange's basketball, football and lacrosse games.

== Career ==
In April 2019, Eagle tried out for the Los Angeles Clippers TV play-by-play job, but did not get the role. However, he was offered the radio play-by-play job for the Clippers, which he began in October 2019.

In the summer of 2021, Eagle worked the play-by-play assignment of 3x3 basketball for NBC Sports' coverage of the 2020 Summer Olympics, the first time the sport was played at the Olympic Games.

Eagle joined CBS Sports in 2021 as the play-by-play broadcaster for their #2 broadcasting team for college football. His role consisted of calling games during the SEC on CBS doubleheaders and calling select CBS Sports Network games. Eagle worked in this role during the 2021 season due to Carter Blackburn, who had held that role from 2014 to 2015, and again from 2017 to 2020, being on sabbatical.

He has also called special NFL broadcasts for CBS' sibling cable network Nickelodeon since 2021, teaming with fellow CBS sportscaster Nate Burleson and Nickelodeon star Gabrielle Neveah Green on coverage of two Wild Card playoff games and a Christmas Day contest. Eagle and Burleson again teamed up to call a Christmas Day game, as well as Super Bowl LVIII during the 2023 season, with Nickelodeon characters joining them in the booth.

In 2022, Eagle was paired with his father's former announcing partner Dan Fouts for Los Angeles Chargers preseason games airing on KCBS-TV. Eagle also moved over to Fox Sports that same year, working as a play-by-play announcer for their college basketball coverage and later their college football coverage. Eagle has also spent time filling in on MLB games as a studio host for Fox. Eagle's first instance calling an NFL game on network television came in 2022 when he called a Week 6 matchup between the 49ers and the Atlanta Falcons on Fox, filling in for colleague Adam Amin, who was covering postseason baseball for Fox. On December 17, 2022, Eagle and Burleson worked the 2022 Indianapolis Colts-Minnesota Vikings game for NFL Network. With the Vikings win, by a score of 39–36, in overtime, they came back from being down by 33 points at halftime for the biggest comeback in NFL history.

In February 2023, NBC announced that Eagle would be their play-by-play broadcaster for their newly acquired Big Ten Saturday Night package, as well as their Big Ten basketball package on Peacock. Eagle also returned as the Chargers preseason TV play caller in 2023. In September 2023, it was announced that Eagle had joined the YES Network as an alternate play-by-play behind his father, Ian Eagle, and Ryan Ruocco, thus leaving his role with the Clippers. Eagle, alongside Todd Blackledge, called the Bengals-Steelers game for Week 16 on NBC, while Mike Tirico and the main NBC booth team called the Peacock exclusive Bills-Chargers game. The duo returned for the NFL playoffs on Wild Card weekend to call the Browns-Texans game. They also called the first NFL game in Brazil between the Green Bay Packers and Philadelphia Eagles for Peacock on September 6, 2024.

NBC announced in April 2024 that Eagle would take on play-by-play duties for the United States men's and women's basketball teams at the 2024 Summer Olympics in Paris. Eagle also handled the gold medal matches, which featured the United States defeating France on both the men's and women's side.

Eagle was the lead play-by-play announcer for NBC Sports/Peacock at the 2024 French Open tennis championships and for a Netflix NFL game on Christmas Day.

In February 2025, NBC announced that Eagle would be a play-by-play broadcaster for their NBA coverage beginning in the 2025–26 season. He worked the 2026 NBA All-Star Game for NBC.

On November 8, 2026, Eagle would step into the NBC Sunday Night Football booth to call the Tampa Bay Buccaneers-Chicago Bears contest in place of Mike Tirico, who was dealing with an undisclosed health issue. Eagle had already been nearby in South Bend, Indiana for Notre Dame’s victory over Miami the night before.

== Play-by-play roles ==
Los Angeles Clippers

- Radio broadcasts (2019–2023)

CBS Sports

- NFL on Nickelodeon (2021–2024)
- NCAA Football (2021)

NBC Sports

- Olympic Games (2021–present), various events
- Big 10/Notre Dame Saturday Night (2023–present), lead broadcaster
- NFL on NBC (2023–present), secondary broadcaster
- NCAA Basketball (2023–present), lead broadcaster
- 2024 French Open, lead broadcaster
- NBA on NBC (2025–present), co-lead broadcaster

Fox Sports

- NCAA Football (2022)
- NCAA Basketball (2022–2023)

Los Angeles Chargers

- Preseason broadcasts (2022–present)

Brooklyn Nets

- Alternate television broadcaster (2023–present)

Netflix

- NFL Christmas Day Special (2024–present)
