= WJPZ-FM =

FM radio station in Syracuse, New York

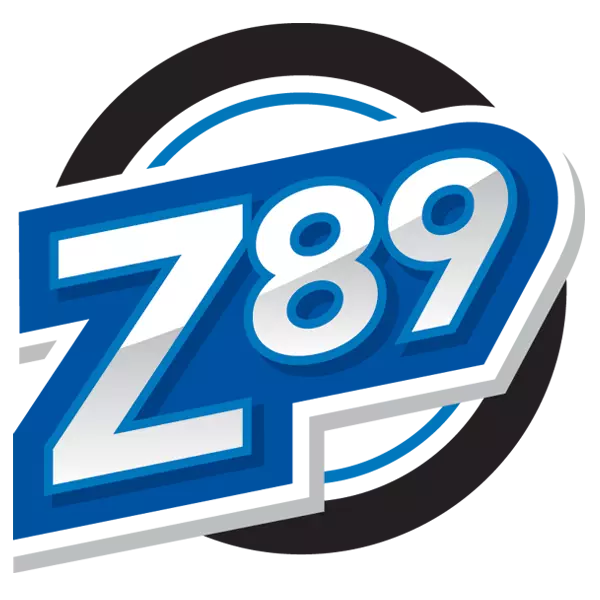

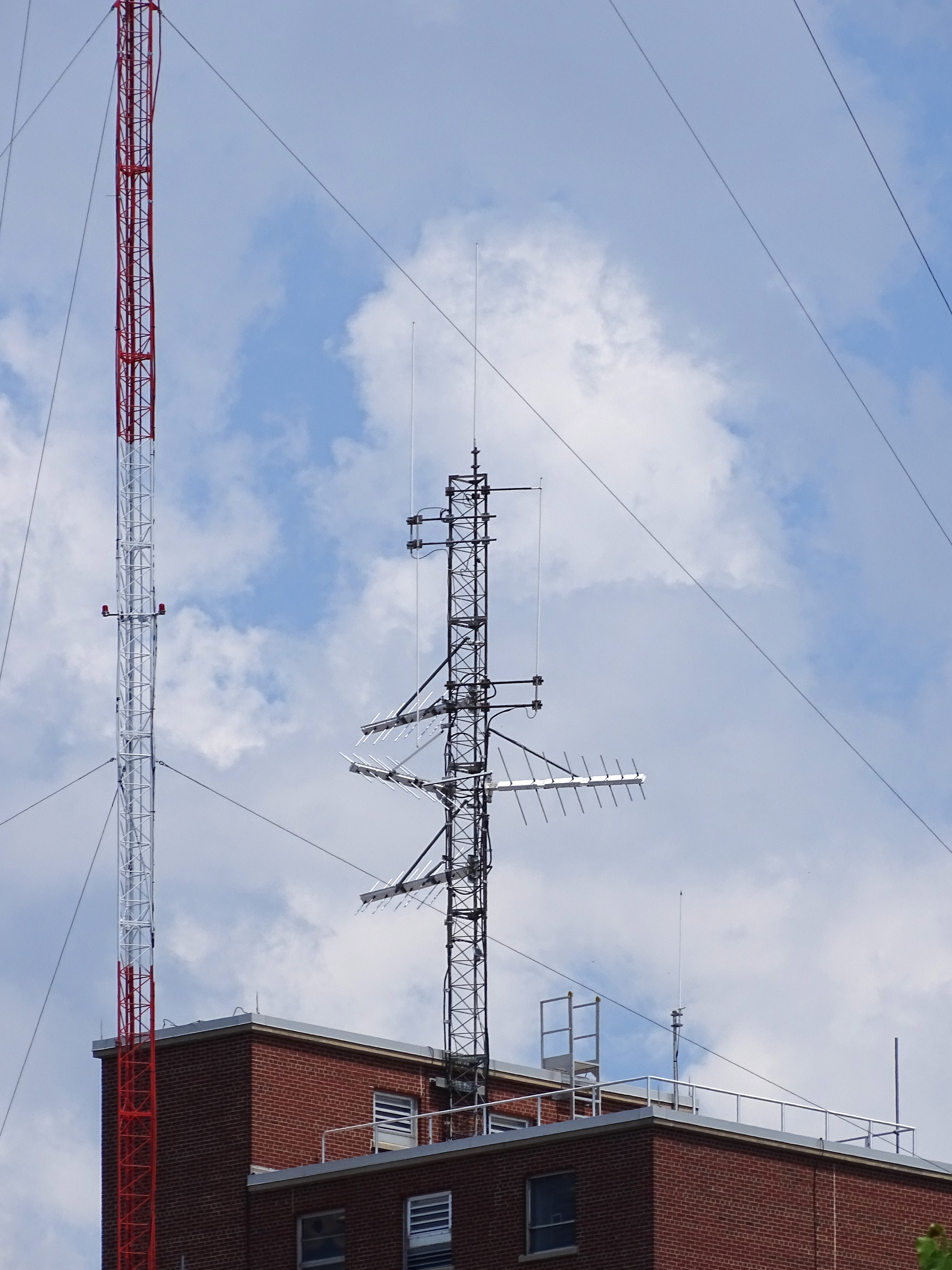
- The WJPZ-FM antenna, atop Day Hall.
- Syracuse, New York; United States
- Broadcast area: Central New York
- Frequency: 89.1 MHz (HD Radio)
- Branding: Z89

Programming
- Format: Contemporary hit radio

Ownership
- Owner: WJPZ Radio, Inc.
- Sister stations: WAER; WERW

History
- First air date: 1972
- Call sign meaning: None; chosen at random

Technical information
- Licensing authority: FCC
- Facility ID: 73148
- Class: A
- ERP: 1,000 watts
- HAAT: 37.0 meters (121.4 ft)
- Transmitter coordinates: 43°2′1.2″N 76°7′51.7″W

Links
- Public license information: Public file; LMS
- Webcast: Listen live (via iHeartRadio)
- Website: z89online.com

WJPZ-FM (89.1 FM) – branded Z89 – is a radio station in Syracuse, New York. It broadcasts on 89.1 MHz with an effective radiated power of 1,000 watts, and can be heard throughout Syracuse. WJPZ primarily programs a contemporary hit radio (CHR) format. A notable amount of airtime during the academic year is devoted to sports talk and live play-by-play coverage of select local sporting events.

== Ownership ==
Although operated by students, it is an independent organization which is incorporated and licensed by the Federal Communications Commission (FCC) as WJPZ Radio, Inc and leases studio and transmitter facilities on Syracuse University property. WJPZ broadcasts 14 hours of sports talk radio and provides game broadcasts for Central New York high school football, Syracuse Orange women's basketball, and Syracuse women's lacrosse.

== History ==
WJPZ was founded by a group of Syracuse University students including Craig Fox and Bill Bleyle in late 1972. The unlicensed station initially broadcast with a power of one-tenth of a watt, and played Top 40 hits on 1200 AM. The makeshift studio was located in the attic of a building at 100 Waverly Avenue, which housed a campus record store. According to one story, the WJPZ call letters were chosen because the students liked the call letter rhyme scheme for WABC in New York City, while Bill Bleyle has maintained that the letters were chosen at random.

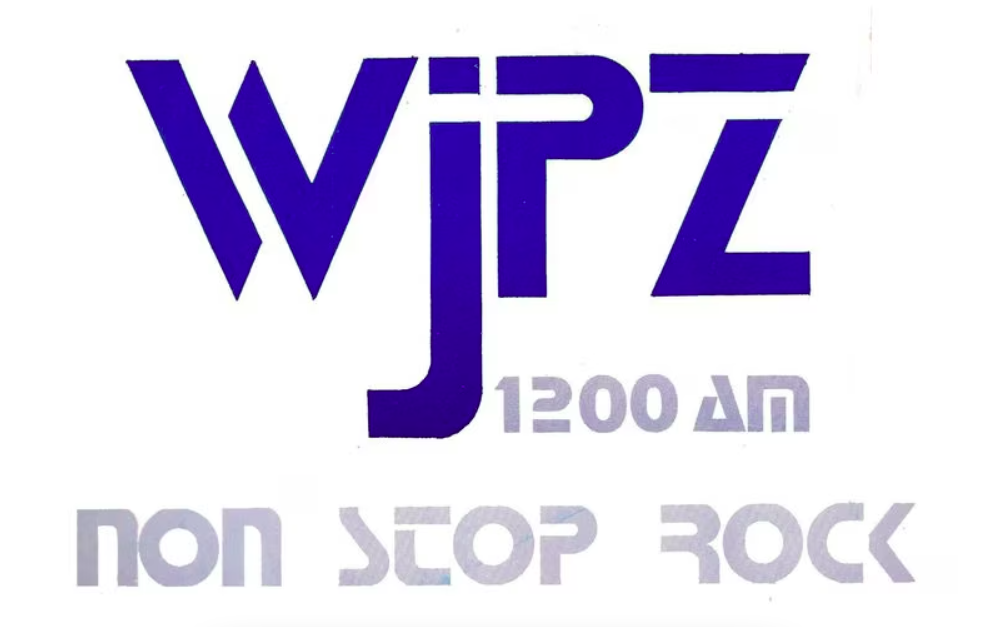
Wordmark for WJPZ (AM 1200) Non-Stop-Rock (c. 1975).

After construction of the Newhouse 2 building in 1972, university-supported WAER radio moved into a brand-new facility and discarded equipment that had been in use since 1946. These discarded turntables and parts were salvaged by Fox and Bleyle. WAER was more academically focused and students wanting freedom to learn other aspects tuned in to WJPZ. In 1974, WJPZ relocated to the basement of 821 University Avenue (now the Sheraton Hotel). The station branded itself WJPZ 1200 Z-Rock "Non-Stop Rock," playing a "tasteful blend of Top 40 music and popular album cuts" for a college-age audience 24 hours a day. However, the station was not a fully recognized student organization, and did not have a license because the station's low-power signal did not require one under Part 15 of the FCC's rules. The university wanted a faculty advisor for the station and suggested Dr. Roosevelt "Rick" Wright Jr. Wright, who became the station's biggest champion and helped it grow into a successful student-run and operated operation.

In 1985, the station rebranded Z89 when it acquired an FM license and began broadcasting with 100 watts of effective radiated power. With WAER becoming a "public radio" station and National Public Radio affiliate, the Student Government Association encouraged WJPZ to move to the FM dial. At the time, it was the first and only student-owned and operated FM station in the United States.

In the fall of 1997, WJPZ was placed into receivership for several reasons, but survived. In early 2001, the station moved temporarily into an off-campus house on Ostrom Avenue, and that fall settled into the Menchel Media Center inside Watson Hall, where it broadcasts from today.

On June 29, 2017, the station increased power to 1,000 watts.

Currently WJPZ broadcasts as part of Syracuse University's student media organization. The WJPZ Alumni Association organizes events and curates a Hall of Fame wall.

== Greatest Media Classroom and WJPZ at 50 ==
In 2014, WJPZ alumnus Scott MacFarlane produced Greatest Media Classroom documentary film to chronicle the 40-year history of WJPZ. The film showcased the students' ambition and self-reliance in creating and running the station, as well as their ability to handle tragic events such as the Pan Am Flight 103 tragedy in 1988. It was commissioned by the WJPZ Alumni Association.

In 2023, a new podcast "WJPZ at 50" was created and produced by WJPZ to mark the station's 50th anniversary. It consists of 50 episodes. Hosted by Jon "JAG" Gay, a Class of 2002 alumnus, the podcast featured interviews with current and former staffers about their experiences at SU and the station. Notable guests included CBS News Correspondent Scott MacFarlane and ESPN Radio's Mike Couzens, as well as business owners and communicators from the radio industry.
