= Mike Tirico =

American sportscaster (born 1966)

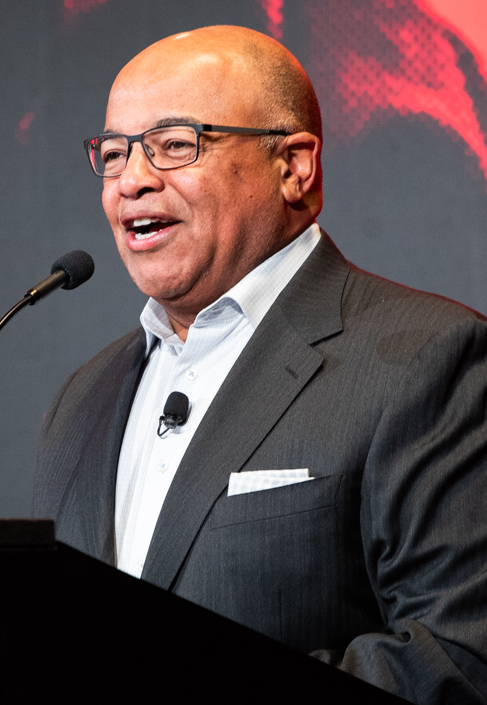
- Tirico in 2024
- Born: Michael Todd Tirico; December 13, 1966 (age 59); New York City, U.S.
- Education: Syracuse University
- Occupation: Sportscaster
- Years active: 1987–present
- Employer(s): Meredith Corporation (1987–1991); Capital Cities/ABC Inc. (1991–1996); The Walt Disney Company (1996–2016); Comcast (2016–present)
- Television: WTVH (1987–1991); ESPN/ABC (1991–2016); NBC Sports (2016–present)
- Spouse: Deborah Gibaratz (m. 1991)
- Children: 2

Michael Todd Tirico (/tɪˈriːkoʊ/; born December 13, 1966) is an American sportscaster. He is currently the lead play-by-play announcer for NBC Sunday Night Football, having replaced Al Michaels in 2022, and became the lead play-by-play announcer for NBC's NBA coverage in 2025. Tirico is also the primary primetime host for the Olympics on NBC and the host of Triple Crown races on NBC.

From 1997 to 2006, Tirico served as lead announcer for the PGA Tour on ABC. From 2006 to 2015, he served as a play-by-play announcer on ESPN's Monday Night Football. Tirico has called a multitude of sports in his career, including the NBA, NHL, NFL, college football and basketball, golf, tennis, and World Cup soccer.

Tirico left ESPN after 25 years with the network when his contract expired in mid-2016, and was subsequently hired by NBC Sports. Tirico debuted during NBC's coverage of the 2016 Open Championship and has since served as the network's lead host for golf coverage.

With NBC Sports, Tirico has hosted NBC's coverage of the Indianapolis 500, was the lead play-by-play for Notre Dame Football on NBC, hosted Football Night in America, and hosted NBC's coverage of the Stanley Cup Finals.

== Early life and education ==
Tirico was born on December 13, 1966, in New York City to an Italian American mother and an African American father. He grew up in the borough of Queens, graduating from Bayside High School. In 1988, Tirico graduated from the S. I. Newhouse School of Public Communications and the College of Arts and Sciences as a dually enrolled student at Syracuse University. At Syracuse, he was the first recipient of the Robert Costas scholarship. While at Syracuse, Tirico worked with WAER and The Daily Orange.

== Career ==
=== ABC and ESPN (1991–2016) ===
Tirico joined ESPN in 1991 as a SportsCenter anchor, after four years as sports director at CBS affiliate WTVH in Syracuse, New York, during his undergraduate years at Syracuse University. Tirico was noted for his versatile nature and the variety of assignments he handled for SportsCenter. Tirico was the first host seen on ESPNews.

Tirico also handled the play-by-play for ESPN's Thursday night college football package (1997 to 2005), college basketball coverage (1997 to 2002), NBA coverage (2002 to 2016), and golf coverage for ESPN/ABC (1997 to 2015). He also hosted studio coverage of various ESPN and ABC covered events, including a stint on ESPN's Monday Night Countdown (previously known as NFL Prime Monday) from 1993 to 2001 and ABC's NBA studio shows. Tirico broadcast NBA games on ESPN/ABC and play-by-play for the NBA Finals on ESPN Radio. He anchored the 2009 U.S. Open (tennis) and co-anchored the 2010 FIFA World Cup, the 2014 FIFA World Cup, and UEFA Euro 2016 (his last assignment at ESPN/ABC).

Tirico was one of the subjects covered in Mike Freeman's 2000 book ESPN: An Uncensored History, where accounts of misconduct involving him sexually harassing and stalking at least six women led to an employment suspension for three months in 1992.

=== NBC Sports (2016–present) ===
On May 9, 2016, after a leak the prior month, it was officially announced that Tirico would join NBC Sports effective July 1. He signed off for the last time on ESPN on June 30 during the conclusion of that day's coverage of the UEFA Euro 2016 soccer tournament. Tirico's first on-air appearance on an NBC property came during the 2016 Open Championship on NBC's Golf Channel, calling play-by-play for the first three hours of first and second round coverage. He moved to the studio host role in the afternoons on both Thursday and Friday, and Tirico hosted all on the coverage on NBC proper over the weekend.

Tirico served as a studio host and contributor for NBC's broadcasts of the 2016 Summer Olympics from Rio de Janeiro in August. Richard Deitsch of Sports Illustrated suggested that Tirico could potentially succeed Bob Costas as the primetime host of NBC's Olympics coverage. NBC Sports chairman Mark Lazarus explained following the 2014 Winter Olympics that the division had begun to "think about what life after Bob might be, whether post-Rio, post-Pyeongchang, post-Tokyo, whenever he does not want to do it anymore." Deitsch also felt that Tirico's experience in radio could allow him to contribute to the NBC Sports Radio network.

Sports Business Journal initially reported that Tirico would serve as NBC's lead play-by-play announcer for Thursday Night Football (which was expanding to NBC during the upcoming season), and was likely to be a future successor to Al Michaels. The NFL later stated that its contract with NBC required that the network use its lead play-by-play commentator for all primetime broadcasts nationally over-the-air. In the meantime, Tirico called the two preseason games allocated to NBC, hosted Football Night in America on-site and was placed on play-by-play for NBC's first three Notre Dame college football games to fill in for Dan Hicks, due to Hicks' conflicts with his lead play-by-play role on NBC's golf coverage, including the 2016 Ryder Cup. Tirico would join Hicks to host Sunday coverage of the event.

Consequently, Tirico only called to two late-season games in the Thursday Night Football package produced for NFL Network, held on a Saturday and Christmas Sunday respectively, with Doug Flutie and Tony Dungy. In November 2016, NBC announced that Tirico would perform play-by-play with Cris Collinsworth on three Sunday Night Football games (including the Thanksgiving primetime game) and one Thursday Night Football game, filling in for Al Michaels. Michaels had requested time off due to NBC's increased NFL workload.

On February 9, 2017, Bob Costas announced that he would be retiring as the primetime host of NBC's coverage of the Olympics, and that Tirico would replace him beginning at the 2018 Winter Olympics. Tirico also replaced Costas as studio host for NBC's NFL coverage and Football Night in America.

On May 31, 2017, it was announced that Tirico would permanently replace Al Michaels as the play-by-play commentator for all of NBC's Thursday Night Football games. Starting that year, Tirico took over the role of Tom Hammond in Triple Crown coverage and became full-time as the play-by-play announcer for Notre Dame football.

Tirico skipped Super Bowl LII in order to focus on preparing for the 2018 Winter Olympics, which began the following Friday, but contributed to NBC's pregame coverage from Pyeongchang. In the 2018 NFL season, after losing Thursday Night Football to Fox, Tirico was assigned to NBC's Thanksgiving game, joined by his Football Night in America colleagues Tony Dungy and Rodney Harrison. He also called two NFL Network Special games in December produced by Fox Sports.

On February 20, 2019, Tirico called his first NHL game on NBCSN's Wednesday Night Hockey, between the Chicago Blackhawks and Detroit Red Wings, joined by Eddie Olczyk on color commentator and Brian Boucher as the "Inside-the-Glass" reporter. Although he has served as studio host for selected NHL broadcasts, this marked his first broadcast as commentator. His performance was well received by viewers and sportswriters. Starting in January of that year, he hosted both the 2019 NHL Winter Classic and 2020 NHL Winter Classic.

In a similar move to 2016, Tirico filled in for Al Michaels on a few Sunday Night Football games during the 2020 season. Due to the ongoing COVID-19 pandemic, NBC decided to give Michaels 3–5 "bye weeks", in order to minimize travel. One of those weeks was due to Michaels failing to pass NBC's COVID-19 protocols. He also worked one of NBC's two Wild Card games, albeit remotely, also due to COVID-19 protocols. In addition, Tirico had planned to work NBC's Thanksgiving game, but it was postponed to Sunday. Tirico then called the originally planned Sunday night game with Tony Dungy and Kathryn Tappen. Michaels had planned to work the postponed game, but the former game was postponed again to Tuesday, so NBC kept Tirico on duty for the planned Sunday night game, but also placed him back on duty for the game that was later postponed to Wednesday.

Tirico hosted both the 2022 Winter Olympics and the Super Bowl LVI, traveling to Los Angeles part-way through the Games to anchor Olympics coverage from outside SoFi Stadium on the weekend of the Super Bowl.

Coinciding with NBC's return to broadcasting NBA games, Tirico was named NBC's lead play-by-play announcer for its NBA coverage starting in 2025. To prepare for his return to the NBA, NBC assigned Tirico to call two games on NBC's regional networks. He called a Philadelphia 76ers–Portland Trail Blazers game on March 3 on NBC Sports Philadelphia (filling in for Kate Scott), and called a Boston Celtics–Trail Blazers game on March 5 on NBC Sports Boston (filling in for Drew Carter).

In addition to his sports duties, Tirico guest hosted NBC News’ Today program the week of April 14, 2025, filling in for regular host Craig Melvin, who was vacationing with his family.

On November 8, 2026, Tirico declined to call that evening's Sunday Night Football game between the Tampa Bay Buccaneers and Chicago Bears due to health reasons. Noah Eagle was selected to substitute for him.

=== Broadcasting partners ===
Tirico has been paired in the college football booth with Tim Brant, Terry Bowden, Mike Gottfried, Kirk Herbstreit, Lee Corso, and David Norrie. From 2017 until assuming Al Michaels’ Sunday Night Football post, Tirico served as a play-by-play announcer for Notre Dame Football on NBC, partnering with Doug Flutie and later Tony Dungy. In 2021, Drew Brees joined NBC Sports as Tirico's partner for Notre Dame games and on Football Night in America with Tirico and Dungy.

During his career with ESPN, Tirico has called most of NBA games with Hubie Brown. The pair began calling games in the 2006–07 season, when Mark Jackson replaced Brown as lead analyst on ABC. Tirico and Brown form ABC's #2 broadcast team, while Brown would remain paired with Mike Breen on ESPN's lead broadcast team. His other partners included Jon Barry, Doris Burke, P. J. Carlesimo, Sean Elliott, Jeff Van Gundy, Mark Jackson, Steve "Snapper" Jones, George Karl, Tim Legler, Chris Mullin, Jack Ramsay, Jalen Rose, Tom Tolbert, and Bill Walton. Tirico called his last NBA game on May 8, 2016, during the second round of the 2016 NBA playoffs.

Tirico's color commentators for golf coverage were Curtis Strange, Ian Baker-Finch, Nick Faldo, and Paul Azinger. He has worked with Len Elmore on college basketball coverage. Tirico worked with Jon Gruden on Monday Night Football and also the Outback Bowl (2011, 2012, 2013 and 2014) and Orange Bowl (2011 and 2012).

On April 21 and 22, 2007, Tirico appeared as a guest host, filling in for Michael Wilbon, alongside Tony Kornheiser on ESPN's Pardon the Interruption.

On Sunday Night Football, Tirico currently teams with Cris Collinsworth in the booth, Melissa Stark on the sidelines, and rules analyst Terry McAulay, with Kaylee Hartung joining the crew for select playoff games and Super Bowls. For the NBA on NBC, Tirico has called games with Reggie Miller and Jamal Crawford, with either Zora Stephenson or Ashley ShahAhmadi joining on the sidelines.

=== Radio career ===
Tirico hosted his first show from WAER radio in Syracuse, the station where he started his sports broadcasting career, on the campus of Syracuse University. Fellow Orange alum Bob Costas was his first guest. On September 20, 2007, Tirico began hosting the short-lived The Mike Tirico Show on ESPN Radio with co-host Scott Van Pelt (later renamed Tirico &Van Pelt in May 2008), replacing Dan Patrick in its previous timeslot. On May 19, 2009, Tirico announced he would be leaving the show to focus more on his television duties; the show would carry on as The Scott Van Pelt Show, with Ryen Russillo becoming the new co-host.

== Awards ==
In 2017, Tirico won the Marty Glickman Award for Leadership in Sports Media from the S.I. Newhouse School of Public Communications.

== Personal life ==
Tirico and his wife Debbie, a Michigan native, have two children. They have lived in Ann Arbor, Michigan, since 1999.

Tirico's parents, Donald and Maria, were separated when he was about four, and Tirico says he has since lost contact with his father's side of the family. His mother's side of the family are all of Italian ancestry. At one point, Tirico said: "The only contact I had growing up was with my mom's side of the family. And they are all as white as the refrigerator I'm standing in front of right now." In regard to a genealogical test to see if he has a black ancestor, Tirico said: "Yeah. I'd like to find out the truth at some point, so I can answer questions for my kids", but made it clear that he did not feel any urgency. In September 2022, Tirico acknowledged that his father is African American.

In May 2025, Tirico prematurely left NBC Sports' coverage of the 2025 Kentucky Derby after suffering a serious allergic food reaction, with Ahmed Fareed filling in to host the rest of the broadcast. In a segment on NBC's Today a few days later, Tirico explained that he has had a nut allergy for his whole life. Tirico encouraged viewers to "ask, inquire, be curious, and be courteous to those who have nut allergies or other food allergies."

Preceded by Al Michaels	Monday Night Football play-by-play announcer 2006–2015	Succeeded by Sean McDonough
Preceded by Bob Costas	American television prime time anchor, Summer Olympic Games; 2016–present	Succeeded by Incumbent
Preceded by Bob Costas	American television prime time anchor, Winter Olympic Games; 2018–present	Succeeded by Incumbent
Preceded by Al Michaels	Thursday Night Football play-by-play 2017	Succeeded by Joe Buck
Preceded by Al Michaels	Sunday Night Football play-by-play 2022–present	Succeeded by Incumbent
Preceded by Al Michaels	Lead NFL on NBC play-by-play announcer 2022–present	Succeeded by Incumbent
