= Newhouse School of Public Communications =

Communications and journalism school at Syracuse University

Coordinates: 43.0399°N 76.1352°W

- Former names: Department of Journalism (1919–1934); School of Journalism (1934–1971)
- Type: Private
- Established: 1919; 107 years ago
- Parent institution: Syracuse University
- Accreditation: ACEJMC
- Dean: Mark Lodato
- Academic staff: 130
- Undergraduates: 2,000
- Postgraduates: 380
- Doctoral students: 15
- Location: Syracuse, New York, U.S.
- Campus: Urban
- Website: newhouse.syr.edu

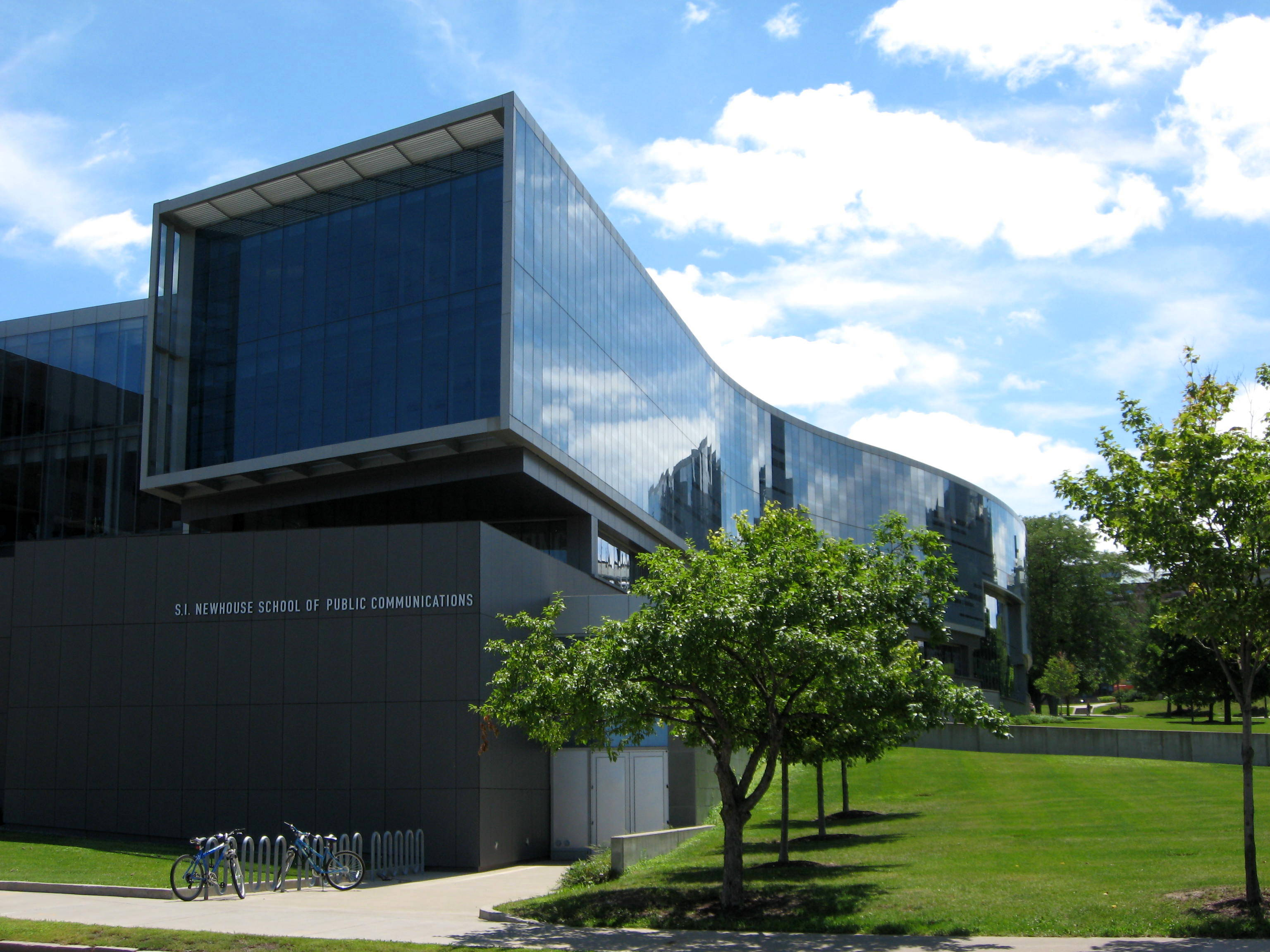
The outside of the Newhouse School of Public Communications in 2014.

The Newhouse School of Public Communications (formally S. I. Newhouse School of Public Communications; also as the Newhouse School) is the communications and journalism school of Syracuse University in Syracuse, New York. The school was named after publishing magnate Samuel Irving Newhouse Sr., founder of Advance Publications, who provided the founding gift in 1964.

The school enrolls approximately 2,000 undergraduate students, 180 residential master’s degree students, 200 online master's degree students, and 15 doctoral degree candidates as of 2022. Undergraduate admissions are highly selective. The school has about 80 full-time faculty members and about 50 adjunct instructors. Mark J. Lodato has been the dean of the Newhouse School since July 2020.

== History ==
=== Early years ===
The Department of Journalism was established at Syracuse University in 1919 as a part of the College of Business Administration. The Theta Sigma Phi (ΘΣΦ) journalism sorority was established in 1920. SU produced a radio show over WSYR-FM in 1932 and the production studio was housed in the Crouse College.

=== Formation of the School of Journalism ===
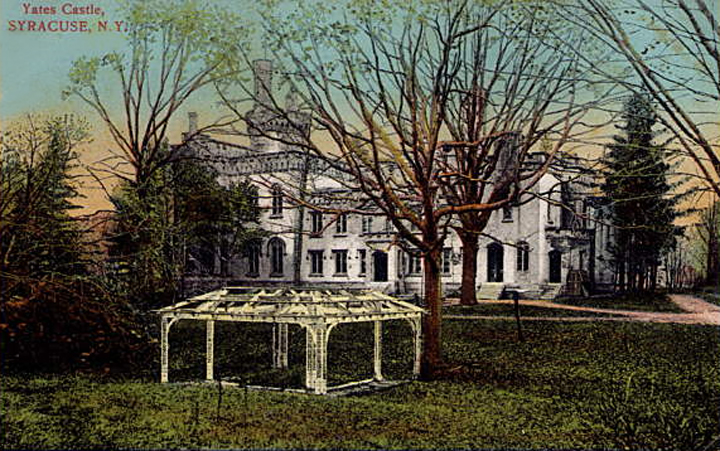
Yates castle c. 1910.

The department became a separate School of Journalism in 1934, with Matthew Lyle Spencer serving as the founding dean. The new school was housed in the Yates Castle (Renwick Castle) from 1934 until the buildings demolition in 1954. The school was moved into the Old Gym from 1953 until that building was razed in 1965.

In 1932, Syracuse University became the first university in the nation to offer a college credit radio course. In 1947, SU launched WAER, one of the nation's first college radio stations. With the emergence of television, SU was the first to offer instruction in the field in 1956.

=== Construction of the Newhouse Complex ===
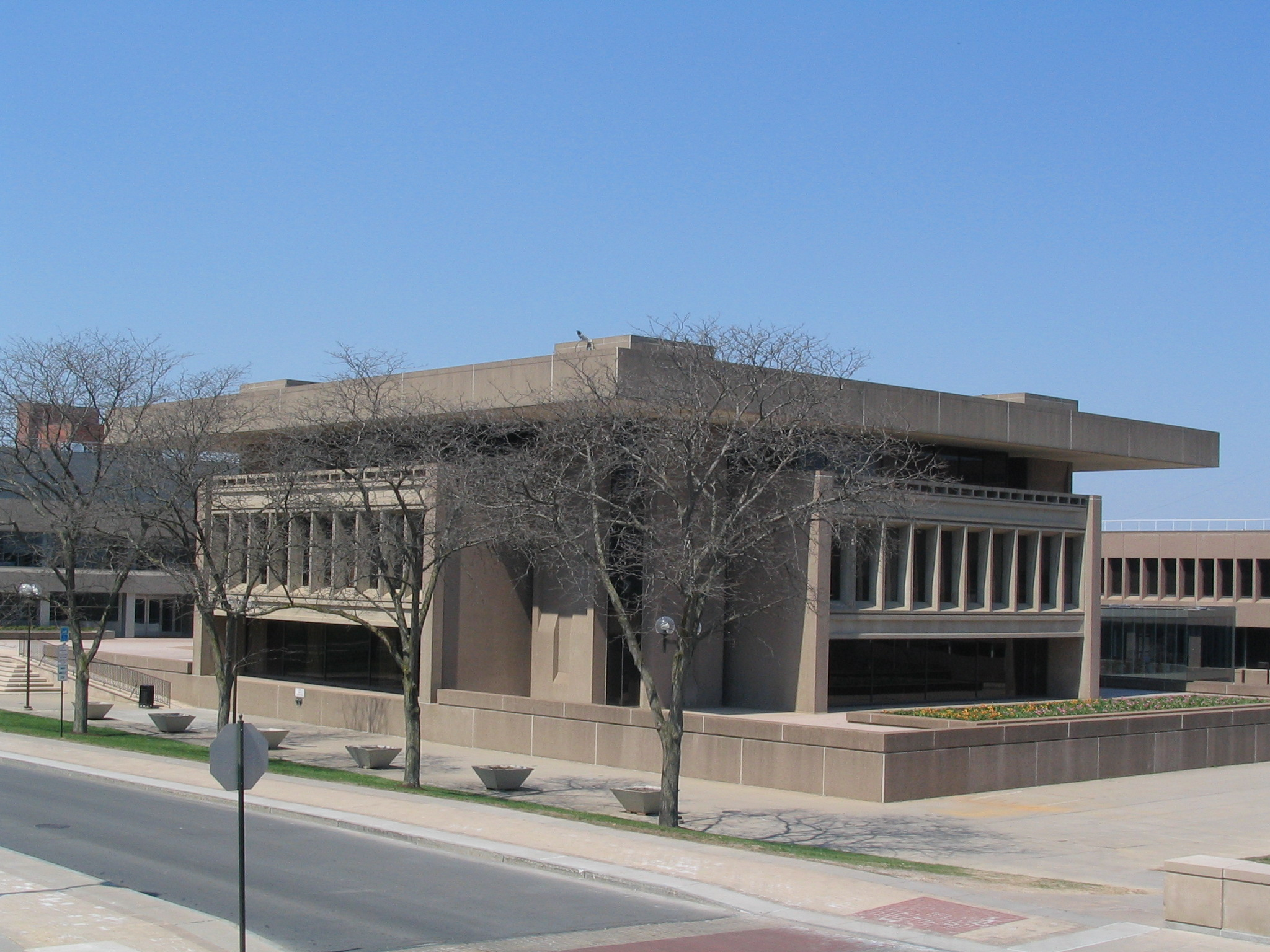
Newhouse 1, Designed by I. M. Pei.

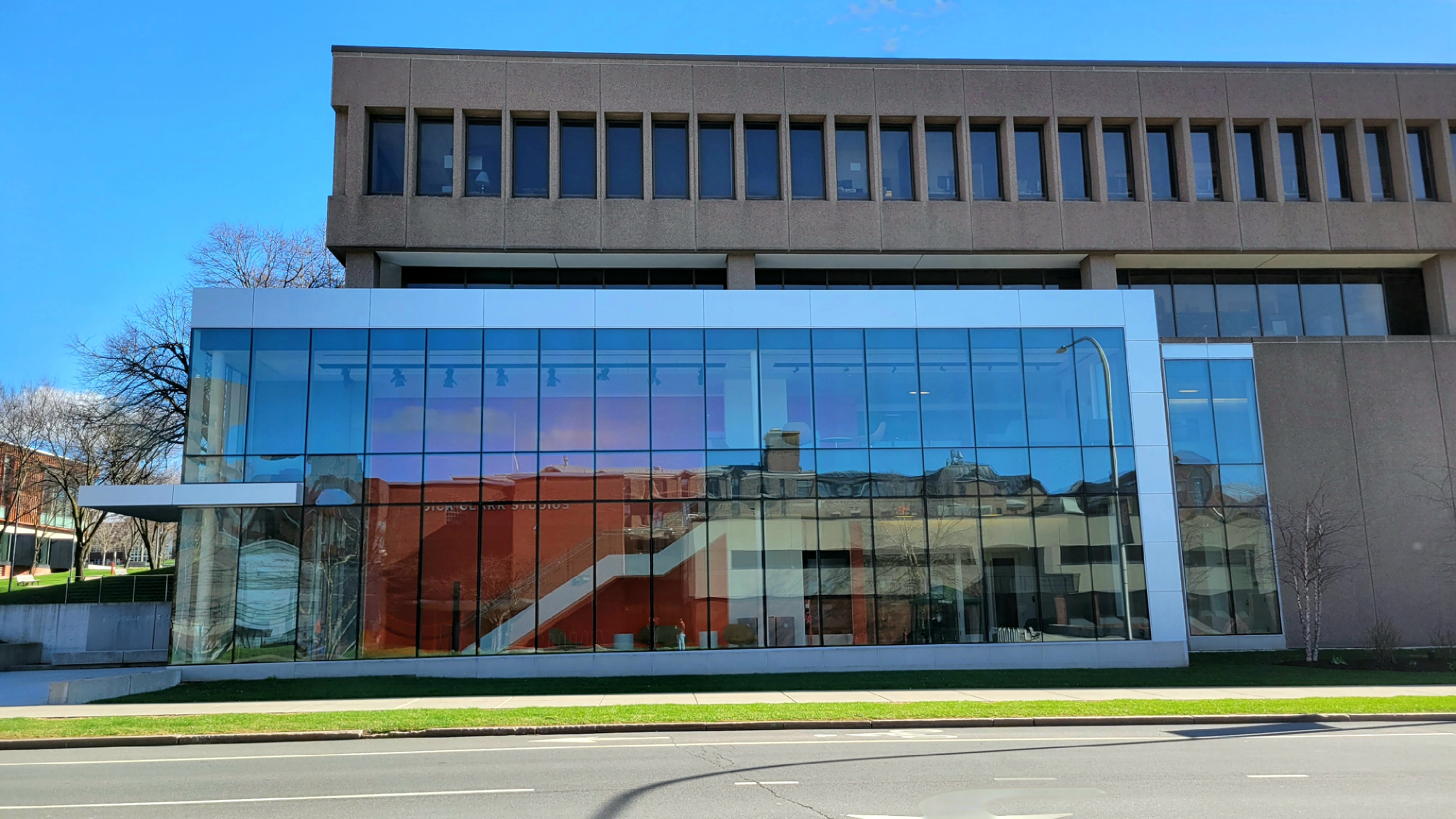
Newhouse 2 Building & Dick Clark Studios at the Waverly Ave entrance.

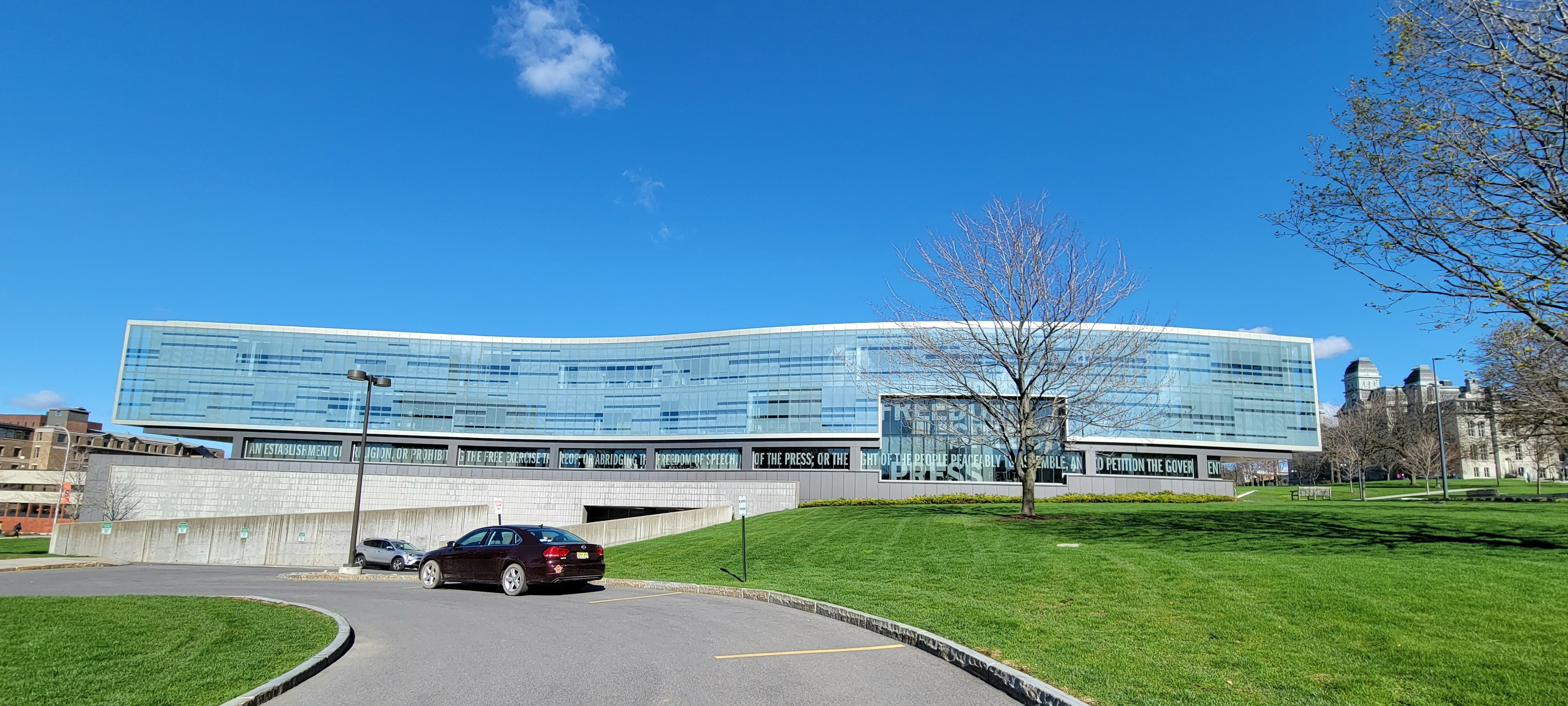
Newhouse 3, built in 2007, features the First Amendment etched in six-foot-high letters on its curving glass windows.

In 1964, supported by a $15 million gift from Samuel Irving Newhouse Sr., the Newhouse Communications Complex was officially inaugurated in Newhouse 1, an award-winning building designed by architect I. M. Pei, which housed the School of Journalism. The building was dedicated by President Lyndon B. Johnson, who delivered his famous "Gulf of Tonkin Speech" on the Newhouse Plaza.

In 1971, the School of Journalism merged with the Department of Television-Radio and was renamed the S. I. Newhouse School of Public Communications. A second building, Newhouse 2, was dedicated in 1974 with a keynote address by William S. Paley, chairman of the board of CBS. It cost $7.2 million to build.

In 2003, the Newhouse School received a $15 million gift from the S. I. Newhouse Foundation and the Newhouse family to fund the construction of the third building in the Newhouse Communications Complex. The $31.6 million 74,000-square-foot (6,900 m^{2}) modern structure, designed by the former Polshek Partnership, features the First Amendment etched in six-foot-high letters on its curving glass windows. Newhouse 3 was dedicated on September 19, 2007, with a keynote address from the Chief Justice of the United States John Roberts.

In September 2014, the school completed an $18 million renovation of the Newhouse 2 building, creating the Newhouse Studio and Innovation Center, which features Dick Clark Studios, the Alan Gerry Center for Media Innovation and the Diane and Bob Miron Digital News Center. Oprah Winfrey attended and spoke at the dedication ceremony.

In January 2020, Donald E. Newhouse donated $75 million to the School through the Newhouse Foundation.

== Deans of the Newhouse School of Public Communications ==
1. 1934–1950 Matthew Lyle Spencer
2. 1950–1972 Wesley Clark
3. 1972–1980 Henry Schulte
4. 1980–1989 Edward Stephens
5. 1989–1990 Lawrence Myers Jr.
6. 1990–2008 David Rubin
7. 2008–2019 Lorraine Branham
8. 2019–2020 Amy Falkner (interim)
9. 2020– Mark J. Lodato

== Notable Newhouse alumni ==
The Newhouse School is known for its notable alumni in sports broadcasting and other fields, including:

- Marv Albert, sportscaster, CBS Sports, NBC Sports, TNT Sports, MSG Networks, YES Network
- Lylah M. Alphonse, former managing editor, U.S. News & World Report; currently Editor of Globe Rhode Island and Globe New Hampshire at The Boston Globe.
- Michael Barkann, host/reporter, Comcast SportsNet and USA Network
- Richard Benedetto, retired White House Correspondent and Columnist, USA Today; Political Columnist, Gannett News Service
- Jason Benetti, sportscaster, NBC Sports, Detroit SportsNet, formerly ESPN, Fox, and NBC Sports Chicago
- Matthew Berkowitz, filmmaker
- Len Berman, Former sporstcaster (NBC Sports)
- Carter Blackburn, sportscaster, CBS Sports
- Paul Bouche, Emmy Award-Winning TV Host and Producer A Oscuras Pero Encendidos
- Contessa Brewer, journalist for MSNBC
- Kevin Brown, sportscaster, ESPN, MASN
- Steve Bunin, sportscaster, ESPN
- Ryan Burr, sportscaster, ESPN
- Tony Caridi, sportscaster
- Craig Carton, sportscaster, WFAN
- Joe Castiglione, sportscaster, WEEI
- Michael Cole, sportscaster, WWE
- Bob Costas, sportscaster, NBC Sports, TNT Sports, and MLB Network
- Dennis Crowley, co-founder, Foursquare
- Andrew Catalon, sportscaster, CBS Sports, formerly NBC Sports
- Eric Collins, sportscaster, Fox Sports and FanDuel Sports Network Southeast
- Shanti Das, owner, PressReset Me LLC
- Matt Dery, sportscaster
- Ian Eagle, broadcaster, CBS Sports, TNT Sports, YES Network, and Amazon Prime
- Noah Eagle, broadcaster, NBC Sports. Ian Eagle's son
- Spike Eskin, radio personality, WIP
- Ahmed Fareed, sportscaster, NBC Sports
- Dave Flemming, sportscaster, ESPN/ABC, KNBR
- Brian Frons, former president, ABC Daytime
- Steve Gelbs, sportscaster, SNY
- Steve Goldstein, sportscaster
- Jeff Glor, anchor, CBS Evening News
- Hank Greenwald, sportscaster (deceased)
- Dan Gurewitch, Emmy Award-winning television writer, Last Week Tonight with John Oliver
- Eric Gurian, president, Little Stranger Productions
- Scott Hanson, sportscaster, NFL Network, NFL Redzone
- Ariel Helwani, MMA journalist
- Jim Henderson, sportscaster
- Deborah Henretta, senior advisor, SSA & Company; retired group president, Procter & Gamble
- Dan Hoard, sportscaster, WLW
- Larry Hryb, director of programming, Xbox Live (Microsoft)
- Dave Jageler, sportscaster
- T.J. Jagodowski, comedian, actor and improvisor
- Weijia Jiang, senior White House correspondent, CBS News
- Todd Kalas, sportscaster, Space City Home Network
- Marc Kestecher, sportscaster, ESPN Radio
- Roula Khalaf, first female editor of Financial Times
- Larry S. Kramer, former president of USA Today & Gannett, and current president of TheStreet.com
- Steve Kroft, correspondent, "60 Minutes" (CBS)
- Adam Lefkoe, sportscaster, TNT
- Chris Licht, former chairman and CEO, CNN
- Sean McDonough, broadcaster, ESPN/ABC, Red Sox Radio Network
- Liam McHugh, sportscaster, TNT, formerly NBC Sports
- Joe McNally, photographer
- John Miller, television executive
- Will Murray, producer, The Howard Stern Show
- Jeanne Moos, national news correspondent, CNN
- Jim Morris, general manager and executive vice president of production, Pixar
- John Murphy, sportscaster
- Andy Musser, sportscaster (deceased)
- Diane Nelson, former president, DC Entertainment
- Dave O'Brien, sportscaster, ESPN, NESN
- Stanley J. Orzel, Writer/Director
- Greg Papa, sportscaster
- Dave Pasch, sportscaster, ESPN/ABC
- Jeff Passan, sports columnist, ESPN/ABC
- Scott Pioli, NFL executive, sports analyst and broadcaster
- Cory Provus, sportscaster, FOX Sports, TwinsTV
- Philip Quartararo, president, Filament Entertainment; former president, Warner Music Group (deceased)
- Doug Robinson, founder, DRP Doug Robinson Productions
- Bill Roth, sports broadcaster
- Dave Ryan, sportscaster, CBS Sports
- Erin Ryder, co-host, Destination Truth
- Maria Sansone, co-host, Good Day LA
- Eli Saslow, Pulitzer Prize–winning journalist, The Washington Post
- Adam Schein, anchor, CBS Sports, SportsNet New York (SNY)
- Anish Shroff, sportscaster, ESPN/ABC, Carolina Panthers Radio Network
- Andrew Siciliano, sportscaster, NFL Network, Cleveland Browns Radio Network
- Fred Silverman, president, The Fred Silverman Company (deceased)
- Lakshmi Singh, midday newscaster, NPR
- Bill Spaulding, sportscaster, MSG Network (MSG)
- Dick Stockton, sportscaster, CBS Sports, Fox Sports, and TNT Sports
- John Sykes, president, Entertainment Enterprises, iHeartMedia
- Mark Tinker, Emmy Award-winning television director, NYPD Blue and Deadwood
- Mike Tirico, sportscaster, NBC Sports, formerly of ESPN/ABC
- Robin Toner, first female political correspondent for The New York Times
- Stephen Wilkes, photographer
- Nick Wright, sports personality, FOX Sports
- Adam Zucker, sportscaster, CBS Sports

== See also ==
- Mirror Awards
- Toner Prize for Excellence in Political Reporting
