= WSYR =

WSYR may refer to:

Current stations:

- WSYR (AM), a radio station (570 AM) licensed to Syracuse, New York
- WSYR-FM, a radio station (106.9 FM) licensed to Solvay, New York
- WSYR-TV, a television station (channel 17 / virtual 9) licensed to Syracuse, New York, United States

Former stations:

- WPHR-FM, a radio station (94.7 FM) licensed to Gifford, Florida, United States, which held the call sign WSYR-FM from 2003 to 2011
- WYYY, a radio station (94.5 FM) licensed to Syracuse, New York, which held the call sign WSYR-FM until 1983
- WSTM-TV, a television station (channel 24 / virtual 3) licensed to Syracuse, New York, United States, which held the call sign WSYR-TV from 1950 to 1980
