= WPHR =

WPHR may refer to:

- WPHR-FM, a radio station (94.7 FM) licensed to Gifford, Florida, United States
- WSYR-FM, a radio station (106.9 FM) licensed to Solvay, New York, United States, which held the call signs WPHR and WPHR-FM from 2001 to 2011
- WHEN (AM), a radio station (620 AM) in Syracuse, New York, United States, which carries the former format of WPHR-FM in Solvay
- WPYR, a radio station (1380 AM) licensed to Baton Rouge, Louisiana, United States, which held the call sign WPHR in 2005
- WENZ, a radio station (107.9 FM) licensed to Cleveland, Ohio, United States, which held the call sign WPHR from 1987 to 1992
- WRNL, a radio station (910 AM) licensed to Richmond, Virginia, United States, which held the call sign WPHR from 1932 to 1937
