= SYR =

Syr or SYR may refer to:

- Sigurd Syr (c. 970-1018), Norwegian petty king
- Sonic Youth Recordings
- South Yarra railway station, Melbourne
- South Yorkshire Railway (1849–1864)
- Sýr, a name of Freyja in Norse mythology
- Syracuse Hancock International Airport (IATA airport code SYR)
- Syr Darya, a major river of Central Asia
- Syre, a river in Luxembourg
- Syria, ISO 3166-1 abbreviation
- ICAO designator for Syrian Airlines, a Syrian airline
- William F. Walsh Regional Transportation Center, Syracuse, New York
- Cheese, called Syr or Sýr in some Slavic languages

== See also ==
- Sir (disambiguation)
- WSYR (disambiguation)
