= WBBS =

Coordinates: 43.214°N 76.396°W

- Fulton, New York; United States
- Broadcast area: Syracuse metropolitan area
- Frequency: 104.7 MHz (HD Radio)
- Branding: B-104.7

Programming
- Format: Country
- Affiliations: Premiere Networks

Ownership
- Owner: iHeartMedia, Inc.; (iHM Licenses, LLC)
- Sister stations: WHEN; WSYR; WSYR-FM; WWHT; WYYY

History
- First air date: August 1, 1961
- Former call signs: WOSC-FM (1961–1973); WKFM (1973–1993)
- Call sign meaning: Best music in Syracuse

Technical information
- Licensing authority: FCC
- Facility ID: 48730
- Class: B
- ERP: 50,000 watts
- HAAT: 150 meters (490 ft)

Links
- Public license information: Public file; LMS
- Webcast: Listen live (via iHeartRadio)
- Website: b1047.iheart.com

WBBS (104.7 FM "B-104.7 FM") is a commercial radio station licensed to Fulton, New York, and serving the Syracuse metropolitan area. It airs a country format and is owned by iHeartMedia, Inc. The studios and offices are on Plum Street in Syracuse. In morning drive time, it airs the nationally syndicated Bobby Bones Show.

WBBS has an effective radiated power (ERP) of 50,000 watts, the maximum for most FM stations in New York. The transmitter is off Lamson Road at East Mud Lake Road in Lysander. WBBS broadcasts using HD Radio technology. Its HD-2 digital subchannel formerly carried the iHeartCountry 80s Radio service. The HD2 subchannel has since been turned off.

== History ==
The station signed on the air on August 1, 1961. The call sign was WOSC-FM, representing its home county, Oswego County. It mostly simulcast its sister station, WOSC (1300 AM). The two stations were owned by Cassill Radio Company and were network affiliates of the Mutual Broadcasting System.

In the 1970s, the station was a Top 40/CHR outlet as WKFM, calling itself "104.7 HitRadio KFM". In 1985, it flipped to album-oriented rock (AOR). In the late 1980s, WKFM switched to classic rock as "104.7 KIX-FM".

The station has been a country music outlet since 1993 and switched its call letters to WBBS shortly after changing the format. B104.7 formerly held an annual summer concert with national recording acts called B-Jam. It later coordinated with "Harborfest" in Oswego.

Until 2007, WBBS competed for country listeners with Sandy Creek-based WSCP and WSCP-FM, before they switched to classic hits. In August 2009, WBBS was challenged by WVOA-FM, which became country music station WOLF-FM, known as "The Wolf". Incidentally, WOLF-FM was WBBS' former sister station and simulcast partner under the call sign WXBB. Some Syracuse-area listeners can also tune to 100,000-watt country station WFRG-FM in Utica.

== Personalities ==
Weekdays on WBBS begin with The Bobby Bones Show based in Nashville. That's followed by Michael J., "Some Guy Named Tias," Shanna, Dusty and syndicated radio program CMT After Midnite with Granger Smith during overnights. Weekend hosts include Tom Owens, Madison, Brooke Taylor, Casey Carter and The iHeart Country House Party. Weather is provided by Dave Longley and news by Christie Casciano from WSYR-TV.

In 2004, B104.7's Ron and Becky received a Country Music Association Award (CMA) for "Personality of the Year" for a US Medium Market. Former morning team hosts Tom Owens and Becky Palmer were nominated for CMA and ACM awards in 2009 and 2010.
