= WSTM-TV =

Television station in Syracuse, New York

ATSC 3.0 station
- Syracuse, New York; United States
- Channels: Digital: 19 (UHF); Virtual: 3
- Branding: NBC 3; CNY Central; CW 6 (3.2)

Programming
- Affiliations: 3.1: NBC; 3.2: The CW; 3.3: Comet

Ownership
- Owner: Sinclair Broadcast Group; (WSTQ Licensee, LLC)
- Sister stations: WKOF; WTVH

History
- First air date: February 15, 1950
- Former call signs: WSYR-TV (1950–1980)
- Former channel numbers: Analog: 5 (VHF, 1950–1953), 3 (VHF, 1953–2009); Digital: 54 (UHF, 2000–2009), 24 (UHF, 2009–2019)
- Call sign meaning: Syracuse Times Mirror (former owner)

Technical information
- Licensing authority: FCC
- Facility ID: 21252
- ERP: 150 kW
- HAAT: 410 m (1,345 ft)
- Transmitter coordinates: 42°56′41.8″N 76°7′6.2″W

Links
- Public license information: Public file; LMS
- Website: cnycentral.com

WSTM-TV (channel 3) is a television station in Syracuse, New York, United States, affiliated with NBC and The CW. It is owned by Sinclair Broadcast Group alongside CBS affiliate WKOF (channel 15) and co-managed with WTVH (channel 5). The three stations share studios on James Street/NY 290 in the Near Northeast section of Syracuse; WSTM-TV's transmitter is located in the town of Onondaga, New York.

== History ==
The station began operations on February 15, 1950, on VHF channel 5 with the call sign WSYR-TV, moving to VHF channel 3 in 1953. It was owned by Advance Publications (the Newhouse family's company) along with the Syracuse Post-Standard, Syracuse Herald-Journal, and WSYR radio (AM 570 and FM 94.5, now WYYY). It was Syracuse's second television station, signing on a year and three months after WHEN-TV (now WTVH). It originally had facilities at the Kemper Building in Downtown Syracuse. In 1958, WSYR-AM-FM-TV moved to new studios on James Street.

Unlike most NBC affiliates in two station markets, WSYR-TV did not take a secondary ABC or DuMont affiliation. WSYR-TV doubled as the NBC affiliate for Binghamton until WINR-TV (now WICZ-TV) signed-on in 1957. The station also operated a satellite station in Elmira until 1980; that station, first known as WSYE-TV and now WETM-TV, is now owned by Nexstar Broadcasting Group and fed via centralcasting facilities of a Syracuse cross-town rival, which ironically now holds the WSYR-TV call letters. It remains affiliated with NBC.

The Newhouse family largely exited broadcasting in 1980. The WSYR cluster had been grandfathered after the Federal Communications Commission (FCC) banned common ownership of newspaper and broadcasting outlets, but lost this protection when Advance dismantled its broadcasting division. Channel 3 was sold to the Times Mirror Company, who—so as to comply with an FCC rule in effect at the time that prohibited TV and radio stations in the same market, but with different owners from sharing the same callsigns—changed the television station's calls to WSTM-TV (for "Syracuse Times Mirror") on March 28 and kept the James Street studios.

In 1986, Times Mirror sold WSTM-TV to SJL Broadcast Management, a broadcast holding company controlled by George Lilly. SJL then sold WSTM-TV to Federal Broadcasting in 1992. That company was bought out by Raycom Media in 1997. The WSYR-TV calls returned to Syracuse in 2005 after Clear Channel Communications purchased WIXT-TV (formerly WNYS-TV) as part of the Ackerley Group acquisition three years earlier. The company changed WIXT-TV's calls to match WSYR radio, which it had owned for several years.

On March 5, 1996, WSTM-TV general manager Charles Bivins died after collapsing at the Syracuse Track and Racquet Club. He was 48 and had previously suffered a mild heart attack two years earlier. Bivins was also a visiting professor at Syracuse University's S. I. Newhouse School of Public Communications teaching television programming. In 2003, Raycom Media purchased Syracuse's low-powered UPN affiliate WAWA-LP from Venture Technologies Group for an undisclosed amount of money. The station had its call letters changed to WSTQ-LP (derived from WSTM-TV) and given the on-air branding of "UPN 6, The Q". Raycom used "6" to reflect its cable slot as a result of the station becoming offered on the basic lineup of Time Warner Cable (now Charter Spectrum) on July 1.

Before the purchase, Time Warner Cable had refused to carry WAWA-LP. The same "must-carry" rules that kept the station off the cable system eventually got WSTQ-LP on. The must-carry rules give full-powered stations the option of "retransmission consent" or requiring compensation from cable systems as a condition of carrying a station's signal. In this case, full-powered WSTM-TV can require cable systems like Time Warner Cable to offer WSTQ-LP on their systems as a condition of carrying WSTM-TV.

On March 27, 2006, Raycom Media announced the sale of WSTM-TV and WSTQ-LP to Barrington Broadcasting. The sale was finalized that August. On March 2, 2009, as a result of low ratings and slow advertising sales, it was announced that WTVH would enter into a local marketing agreement with WSTM-TV. Initially, WTVH continued to operate out of its own James Street studios a block away but was eventually merged into WSTM-TV's facilities. WTVH was also integrated into WSTM-TV's website. On September 6, 2009, WTVH's transmitter was damaged after a power failure. While Granite Broadcasting worked to fix the signal, WSTM-TV's third digital subchannel carried that station. On September 12, WTVH's signal was restored.

On February 28, 2013, Barrington Broadcasting announced the sale of its entire group, including WSTM-TV and the LMA for WTVH, to Sinclair Broadcast Group (which announced that it would not renew the LMA with WTVH when it expires in March 2017). To comply with FCC ownership regulations, Sinclair initially announced its intent to transfer the license of its existing Syracuse station, Fox affiliate WSYT, along with WSYT's local marketing agreement with MyNetworkTV affiliate WNYS-TV, to Cunningham Broadcasting. Had the transfer been approved, Sinclair would have continued to effectively own WSYT because nearly all of Cunningham's stock is controlled by trusts in the names of the children of Sinclair's principals. However, in an updated filing that August, Sinclair would instead sell WSYT and the LMA for WNYS-TV to Bristlecone Broadcasting, a company owned by Northwest Broadcasting owner Brian Brady. Following the completion of the sale, Sinclair continued to operate WSYT and WNYS-TV through a transitional services agreement for six months, until May 2014. Those transactions were finalized on November 25.

Through cable coverage, WSTM-TV serves as the de facto NBC affiliate for the Ithaca/Finger Lakes region of New York State, and provides some news coverage in that area. Previously, it served as the de facto NBC affiliate for Watertown until December 1, 2016, when WVNC-LD signed on as that area's first full-time NBC affiliate. WSTM-TV also carries substantial news stories from Utica and Herkimer County even though that area has its own NBC affiliate WKTV that produces local news. WSTM-TV's analog signal reached parts of Southeastern Ontario and was carried on Cogeco systems in Kingston until February 2009 when it was replaced with Buffalo's WGRZ-TV. WSTM-TV is still (after customer protest) carried on Spectrum systems in Ogdensburg and Gouverneur along with replacement WPTZ out of Plattsburgh.

== News operation ==
Local news offerings on this station originally consisted of ten-minute-long capsules; this effort would not be expanded to thirty-minute full newscasts until the 1960s. For the past two decades, WSTM-TV's newscasts have been second overall in the viewership ratings behind longtime dominant WSYR-TV. As of July 2008, that station remained number one in Central New York for the whole day-part. However, it remained in a tight battle with WSTM-TV for weekday mornings and weeknights at 11. WSYR-TV made up for this with huge leads during the week at noon, 5, 5:30, and 6. In two periods during its broadcasting history, WSTM-TV has used the popular Action News branding.

From 1996 until 2000 through a news share agreement, WSTM-TV produced a prime time newscast for Fox affiliate WSYT. Known as Fox 68 News at 10, the broadcast could be seen every night for thirty minutes. After WSTM-TV declined to renew the arrangement, WSYT then partnered with WTVH to keep the broadcasts continuing. Meanwhile, in 2003, WSTM-TV brought back a weeknight prime time news show for newly acquired sister station WSTQ-LP. Although WTVH would terminate its arrangement with WSYT in April 2006, the nightly 10 o'clock broadcasts were WTVH's most successful having soundly beat WSTM-TV's effort on WSTQ-LP.

After becoming operated by WSTM-TV, WTVH shut down its separate news department and merged it with that of WSTM-TV. This resulted in the elimination of 40 jobs at WTVH. Only Michael Benny was retained to anchor by himself the weeknight newscasts on WTVH from its separate studios (less than a block away on James Street from WSTM-TV's facility) using other personalities from WSTM-TV for all other content. The system set up by WTVH to use videotaped footage (including interviews) shot by WSTM-TV presented problems for WSTM-TV staff, who had to walk to WTVH's old studios to deliver raw video for WTVH to edit for its weeknight news programs. Neither station attempted to offer newscasts outside traditional time slots to compete with WSYR-TV (such as weekdays at 11 a.m., 12:30 p.m., or weeknights at 4 and 7) despite a plan originally announced. However, WSTM-TV eventually expanded WSTQ-LP's weeknight prime time newscast to an hour on August 30, 2010.

In October 2009, Barrington Broadcasting began to produce separate weeknight newscasts on WTVH from a new secondary set at WSTM-TV's facility. Otherwise, at that time, the CBS and NBC stations would simulcast each other on weekday mornings (except the first hour at 4 a.m. on WSTM-TV), weekdays at noon, and weekend evenings. Although WTVH retained unique branding, music, and graphic aspects of the separately-produced news broadcasts on weeknights, coverage was essentially the same with re-purposed and packaged stories from the NBC affiliate airing on WTVH. WSTM-TV usually featured more live reports from the field during a breaking news event.

In mid-December 2010, WSTM-TV became the first television station in the market to produce local newscasts in 16:9 enhanced definition widescreen with the shows on WTVH being included in the change. Although not truly high definition, the broadcasts match the aspect ratio of HD television screens. Rival WSYR-TV upgraded to full high definition on January 29, 2011. Initially, only the newscasts seen on the digital cable feed of WSTQ-LP aired in enhanced definition since its over-the-air low-power analog and digital (on WSTM-DT2) signals remained in pillarboxed 4:3 standard definition. In January 2013, the CW subchannel (WSTM-DT2) was upgraded to high definition allowing the WSTQ-LP shows to be aired terrestrially in widescreen. On October 23, 2016, both WSTM and WTVH became the second and third stations in the Syracuse market to upgrade their newscasts to true HD.

On April 13, 2015, WTVH reintroduced separately-produced local newscasts airing weekday mornings (from 5 to 7 a.m.) and weekdays at noon (seen for a half-hour) with a dedicated anchor and meteorologist that do not appear on WSTM-TV. At the same time, the CBS station also began to feature its own meteorologist for the weeknight newscasts rather than sharing an on-air personality with WSTM-TV. WTVH already had a separate news anchor seen weeknights exclusively on the station. The CBS station continued to simulcast local news with WSTM-TV on weekend evenings. These broadcasts used the two station's shared branding, CNY Central. There could be a preemption or delay on one channel due to network obligations (most notably sports programming).

WSTM-TV was the first in Syracuse to use Doppler weather radar in 1985 and launched its own system in 2000. This consisted of its own radar at the transmitter site in Onondaga as part of a network including WHEC-TV/SUNY Brockport in the Rochester area and WIVB-TV in Buffalo. However, WIVB-TV and WSTM-TV have since shut down their individual radars. During current weather segments, WSTM-TV features three live NOAA National Weather Service radars in Montague, Binghamton and Buffalo. On-air, this is known as "Live Triple Doppler" and the radar beams are superimposed over the on-screen image.

On October 7, 2019, WSTM launched the market's first and only newscast airing at 7 p.m.

On July 1, 2021, Buffalo sister station WUTV introduced a 10 p.m. newscast that was anchored and produced from WSTM's studios. The program also used resources from WHAM-TV in Rochester. It was canceled on January 27, 2023.

=== Notable former on-air staff ===
- Jim Axelrod – reporter (1990–1993)
- Joe Castiglione
- Bob Costas
- Jeff Glor
- Dan Kloeffler
- Steve Kroft
- Dave Ryan

== Technical information ==
=== Subchannels ===
The station's ATSC 1.0 channels are carried on the multiplexed signals of other Syracuse television stations:

Subchannels provided by WSTM-TV (ATSC 1.0)
Subchannel	Res.	Short name	Programming	ATSC 1.0 host
3.1	1080i	WSTMNBC	NBC	WTVH
3.2	1080i	CW6	The CW	WSYR-TV
3.3	480i	Comet	Comet	WTVH

=== Analog-to-digital conversion ===
WSTM-TV shut down its analog signal, over VHF channel 3, on June 12, 2009. Two days later, the station's digital signal moved from its pre-transition UHF channel 54, which was among the high band UHF channels (52-69) that were removed from broadcasting use as a result of the transition, to UHF channel 24, using virtual channel 3.

=== ATSC 3.0 lighthouse ===
Subchannels of WSTM-TV (ATSC 3.0)
Subchannel	Res.	Short name	Programming
3.1	1080p	WSTM	NBC
3.10	1080p	T2	T2
3.11	1080p	PBTV	Pickleballtv
3.20		GMLOOP	GameLoop
3.21		ROXi	ROXi
5.1	1080i	WTVH	Roar (WTVH)
9.1	720p	WSYR	ABC (WSYR-TV)
