= CBS 5 =

CBS 5 may refer to one of the following television stations in the United States:

== Current affiliates ==
- KALB-DT2, a digital channel of KALB-TV in Alexandria, Louisiana
- KAUU in Anchorage, Alaska
- KCTV in Kansas City, Missouri
- KENS in San Antonio, Texas
- KFSM-TV in Fort Smith, Arkansas
- KGMB in Honolulu, Hawaii
- KGWN-TV in Cheyenne, Wyoming
- KPHO-TV in Phoenix, Arizona
- KPIX-TV in San Francisco, California (O&O)
- KREX-TV in Grand Junction, Colorado
- WABI-TV in Bangor, Maine
- WCSC-TV in Charleston, South Carolina
- WDTV in Weston, West Virginia
- WFRV-TV in Green Bay, Wisconsin
- WKOF in Syracuse, New York (branding channel; broadcasts on channel 15)
- WKRG-TV in Mobile, Alabama
- WNEM-TV in Saginaw, Michigan
- WTVF in Nashville, Tennessee

== Formerly affiliated ==
- KION-TV in Monterey, California (broadcasts over the air on channel 46; was branded by its cable channel number such as KION 5/46 from 2014 to 2025)
- KOBI in Medford, Oregon (primary from 1953–1978 and secondary from 1978–1983)
- KSL-TV in Salt Lake City, Utah (1949–1995)
- KXGN-TV in Glendive, Montana (1962–2025)
- WAGA-TV in Atlanta, Georgia (1949–1994)
- WEWS-TV in Cleveland, Ohio (1947–1956)
- WHDH-TV in Boston, Massachusetts (1961–1972)
- WOI-TV in Ames–Des Moines, Iowa (1950–1955)
- WRAL-TV in Raleigh, North Carolina (1985–2016)
- WTVH in Syracuse, New York (1949–2025)
