= WSTQ-LP =

Television station in Syracuse, New York (2000–2021)

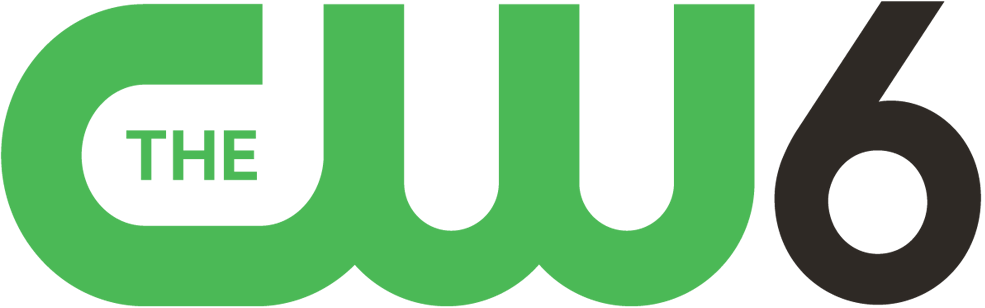

Syracuse, New York; United States
- Channels: Analog: 14 (UHF); Digital: 14 (UHF) (CP, never built)
- Branding: CW 6

Programming
- Affiliations: Defunct

Ownership
- Owner: Sinclair Broadcast Group; (WSTQ Licensee, LLC)
- Sister stations: WSTM-TV, WTVH

History
- Founded: June 10, 1985
- First air date: June 19, 2000
- Last air date: February 5, 2021; (20 years, 231 days); (license canceled)
- Former call signs: W14AE (1985–1996); WAWA-LP (1996–2003)
- Former affiliations: Independent (2000–2001); UPN (2001–2006); The CW (2006–2021)
- Call sign meaning: disambiguation of WSTM-TV

Technical information
- Licensing authority: FCC
- Facility ID: 10320
- ERP: 9.8 kW (analog); 15 kW (digital CP, never built)
- HAAT: 34 m (112 ft) (analog); 262.3 m (860.6 ft) (digital CP, never built)
- Transmitter coordinates: 43°3′30″N 76°9′59″W (analog); 42°56′41.8″N 76°7′6.2″W (digital CP, never built)
- Translator(s): WSTM-TV 3.2 Syracuse

Links
- Public license information: LMS

WSTQ-LP (channel 14) was a low-power television station in Syracuse, New York, United States, which operated from 2000 to 2021. In its latter years, it was owned by Sinclair Broadcast Group as an affiliate of The CW; it had common ownership with NBC affiliate WSTM-TV (channel 3) and was also sister to CBS affiliate WTVH (channel 5), which Sinclair operates through a local marketing agreement (LMA) with Granite Broadcasting. Its operations were housed at the shared studios of WSTM-TV and WTVH on James Street/NY 290 in the Near Northeast section of Syracuse.

WSTQ-LP's transmitter was located in the city's Lakefront section. It did not transmit a digital signal of its own, and its analog signal was only attainable in the immediate Syracuse area (northern and eastern boundary was roughly NY 481/Interstate 481; southwestern reach was NY 173). Therefore, in order to reach the entire market, it was simulcast in 1080i full high definition on WSTM-TV's second digital subchannel, which eventually became its permanent over-the-air conduit. WSTQ-LP's broadcast license was canceled on February 5, 2021, at Sinclair's request, with improvements in WSTM-TV's multiplexer allowing two HD feeds over the same channel making the low-power license all but superfluous.

WSTQ-LP was branded as CW 6 in reference to its universal channel position on area cable systems (not over-the-air channel 6 which was held in the market by WVOA-LD); the WSTM-TV subchannel retains this branding and cable channel.

== History ==
WSTQ-LP signed on June 19, 2000, as WAWA-LP and was owned by Venture Technologies Group, LLC. The majority of the lineup consisted of home shopping and other paid programming. On October 20, 2001, ten months after WNYS-TV dropped its UPN affiliation, WAWA-LP picked it up. For two years, it asked for carriage on Time Warner Cable. Due to the station's schedule outside of prime time, the provider found no justification for doing so, and it was not obligated to carry WAWA-LP due to its status as a low-power station which had no "must-carry" protection.

Time Warner Cable added UPN O&O WSBK-TV from Boston to its line-up on channel 6 in July 2001 in advance of the move of Buffy the Vampire Slayer to UPN's schedule two months later from The WB, at the cost of $1 million a year in out-of-market licensing fees, but with a schedule fully filled with syndicated content and Boston sports outside of prime time. Despite this, WAWA-LP made no effort to improve their schedule outside of prime time to feature less paid programming and home shopping.

At one point, WAWA-LP even offered to pay Time Warner Cable for carriage. Low-power outlets buying channel space on cable is commonplace due to the lack of "must-carry" protection. WAWA-LP took the case to the Federal Communications Commission (FCC) and asked them to adopt a rule that would require the provider to black out WSBK's prime time UPN lineup whether it carried WAWA-LP or not, effectively nullifying the entire purpose by Time Warner to carry WSBK and likely angering viewers of UPN programming had they ruled for the blackout but disallowed WAWA-LP carriage. In the end, the FCC ruled against the station on both counts.

In 2003, Raycom Media (then the owner of WSTM-TV) purchased WAWA-LP from Venture Technologies for an undisclosed amount. The station had its call letters changed to the current WSTQ-LP (a disambiguation from WSTM-TV) and was given the on-air branding "UPN 6, The Q". Raycom used "6" to reflect its pending cable channel slot on Time Warner which was obtained July 1, 2003 (replacing WSBK) following WSTQ-LP's acquisition by the company; carriage of WSTQ-LP was now required by Raycom to carry WSTM-TV under FCC regulations giving full-power stations the option of "retransmission consent" for sister stations (and later, digital subchannels) or requesting compensation from cable systems to carry them. Also under Raycom ownership, the former surrounding home shopping and paid programs were drastically reduced and replaced with regular syndicated programming, and its operations were merged into WSTM's facilities.

On January 24, 2006, CBS Corporation (which split from Viacom in December 2005) and Time Warner's Warner Bros. Entertainment (the division that operated The WB) announced that they would dissolve UPN and The WB, and move some of their programs to a newly created network operated as a joint venture between the companies, The CW Television Network. As a result of that announcement, WSTQ-LP revealed in March that it would become Syracuse's affiliate with the new network. The station became a CW affiliate on September 18 and changed its branding to "CW 6". On March 27, 2006, Raycom Media announced the sale of WSTQ-LP and WSTM-TV to Barrington Broadcasting. Also in 2006, Ion Television affiliate WSPX-TV filed an application with the FCC to broadcast its digital signal on channel 14 where WSTQ-LP's analog signal was located. This was eventually abandoned in favor of channel 15 on December 3, 2008. WSTQ-LP was largely unaffected by the consolidation of WSTM-TV with rival WTVH on March 2, 2009. On February 28, 2013, Barrington Broadcasting announced the sale of its entire group, including WSTQ-LP, to the Sinclair Broadcast Group. The sale was completed on November 25.

The station held an application to flash-cut its analog signal to digital on UHF channel 14. Using the WSTQ-LD call sign (referring to low-power digital), it would have drastically increased the station's coverage area, utilizing the WSTM tower in Onondaga. The application was withdrawn after the FCC slotted WSYT into the physical channel 14 position as part of their spectrum reallocation across the United States.

== Newscast ==
After Raycom acquired WSTQ-LP, WSTM-TV began producing a half-hour prime time newscast called Action News at 10 on UPN 6 which competed with Fox 68 Eyewitness News at 10 seen on WSYT. That program, produced by WTVH, was seen every night for thirty minutes unlike WSTQ-LP's show which was only aired on weeknights. Action News at 10 would eventually be expanded to a seven night operation on January 8, 2005. In April 2006, WTVH ceased producing all local news programming for WSYT in order to focus on its own newscasts that were cemented in third place by this point. Ironically, the 10 o'clock broadcasts on WSYT were WTVH's most successful having soundly beat WSTM-TV's effort on WSTQ-LP in the ratings.

Since dropping news programming from the CBS outlet, WSYT remains one of a handful of Big Four network-affiliated stations throughout the United States that do not produce or air local newscasts. When WSTQ-LP became a CW affiliate, its newscast title changed to Action News at 10 on CW 6. On August 30, 2010, the show's format was expanded to an hour on weeknights featuring more coverage and additional segments. Soon after, on September 7, rival ABC affiliate WSYR-TV added a prime time newscast to its second digital subchannel. Unlike traditional 10 o'clock broadcasts, however, this only airs live for fifteen minutes and is then repeated four times in the hour.

In mid-December 2010, WSTM-TV became the first station in the market to upgrade local newscasts to 16:9 enhanced definition widescreen. Although the broadcast on WSTQ-LP was technically included, it was initially only seen in the updated resolution on Time Warner Cable digital channel 866. This is because WSTM-DT2 (serving as WSTQ-LP's digital signal) only transmitted in pillarboxed 4:3 standard definition at the time. The situation changed in January 2013 when the subchannel was upgraded to high definition transmission thus allowing the WSTQ-LP broadcast to be seen terrestrially in HD. However, the WSTQ-LP newscast was still seen in downscaled 4:3 on the station's analog feed. Corresponding with the upgrade, the program received an updated graphic and music package while being renamed The CW 6 News at 10.

== See also ==
- Channel 6 branded TV stations in the United States
