= WHCD =

WHCD may refer to:

- White House Correspondents' Dinner, an annual event put on by the White House Correspondents' Association
- WSYR-FM (previously WHCD), a news/talk radio station serving Syracuse and central New York
- White House Communications Director, a member of the senior staff of the president of the United States
