= WPHR-FM =

Radio station in Gifford, Florida

Coordinates: 27.555°N 80.368°W

- Gifford, Florida; United States
- Broadcast area: Treasure Coast–Vero Beach–Fort Pierce
- Frequency: 94.7 MHz
- Branding: B94.7

Programming
- Format: Country

Ownership
- Owner: Mitchell Rubenstein and Laurie Silvers; (R&S Radio LLC)

History
- First air date: 1994
- Former call signs: WBBE (1994–1998); WAVW (1998–2003); WSYR-FM (2003–2011)

Technical information
- Licensing authority: FCC
- Facility ID: 40988
- Class: C2
- ERP: 50,000 watts
- HAAT: 101 meters (331 ft)

Links
- Public license information: Public file; LMS
- Website: b947freshcountry.com

WPHR-FM (94.7 MHz "B-94.7") is a commercial FM radio station licensed to Gifford, Florida, and serving the Treasure Coast including Vero Beach and Fort Pierce. The station has a country music radio format and is owned and operated by Mitchell Rubenstein and Laurie Silvers' R&S Radio, LLC.

WPHR-FM has an effective radiated power (ERP) of 50,000 watts. The transmitter is on Old Dixie Highway in Lakewood Park, Florida, near U.S. Route 1.

== History ==
In 1994, the station signed on the air as WBBE. It was later acquired by Clear Channel Communications, the forerunner to today's iHeartMedia.

On January 25, 2008, it was announced that the station, then licensed as WSYR-FM, was one of several Clear Channel Communications radio stations to be sold, in order to remain under the ownership caps following the sale of Clear Channel to private investors. Until it was sold, WSYR-FM and other stations were placed into the Aloha Station Trust. (,) In December 2010, Clear Channel and Aloha filed to switch the station's call sign to WPHR-FM in order to make the WSYR-FM call letters available to WPHR-FM in Solvay, New York (a suburb of Syracuse) as part of its conversion to an FM simulcast of WSYR 570 AM.

On April 25, 2011, the station switched from Hot Adult Contemporary to a talk radio format. Programming was primarily from the co-owned Premiere Networks, including a simulcast the morning show on WJNO 1290 AM in West Palm Beach, followed by The Glenn Beck Program, The Rush Limbaugh Show, The Sean Hannity Show, The Mark Levin Show, The Jason Lewis Show, and Coast to Coast AM with George Noory. At the time, WPHR used the "Rush Radio" brand.

On December 26, 2013, WPHR changed format to country music, branded as "Hot Country 94.7", under new owners R&S Radio. On September 9, 2016, WPHR rebranded as "Fresh Country, B94.7".
