= Joe Koff =

American professional wrestling executive (1951–2024)

- Born: Joseph Koff; February 20, 1951; New York City, U.S.
- Died: October 15, 2024 (aged 73); Baltimore, Maryland, U.S.
- Occupation: Wrestler
- Years active: 1980–2022

Joseph Koff (February 20, 1951 – October 15, 2024) was an American professional wrestling personality. He is best known for his role with the promotion Ring of Honor, where he worked as chief operating officer.

== Life and career ==
Koff began to work in television in 1980 after departing the general manager job at KRUX radio in Phoenix for a sales position at KTVK. Despite the promotion offering a full-time job, he decided to stay in television. He worked as a general sales manager at WFLX in West Palm Beach, Florida, until 1989 and general manager at several stations owned by ABRY Communications: WNUV in Baltimore (1989–1995), WSTR-TV in Cincinnati (1995–1996), and WXLV-TV in Winston-Salem, North Carolina. He also served as president and COO of Muzak in the early 2000s.

In 2003 he began to work with Sinclair Broadcast Group, where he became the senior vice president of training and development. He suggested Sinclair enter pro wrestling and proposed Ring of Honor. Koff was familiar with wrestling: he was the television distributor for Championship Wrestling from Florida's Battle of the Belts specials. On May 21, 2011, Sinclair purchased the professional wrestling promotion Ring of Honor, and ROH's programming began airing on September 24, 2011. Koff worked for Ring of Honor as chief operating officer until May 2022, after ROH was sold to Tony Khan. Cary Silkin, who sold Ring of Honor to Sinclair, credited Koff with keeping ROH alive on multiple occasions during Sinclair's ownership of the promotion.

Koff died from cancer on October 15, 2024, at the age of 73. After his death, Tony Khan paid tribute to him during the Ring of Honor tapings. Sinclair won a television station permit in Syracuse, New York, in 2022. The station, which signed on in July 2025 as WKOF, received its call sign in Koff's memory.
