= Jim Barach =

American politician (born 1956)

Member of the West Virginia House of Delegates from the 36th district
- Incumbent
- Assumed office December 1, 2020

Personal details
- Born: March 25, 1956 (age 70) Los Angeles, California, U.S.
- Party: Democratic
- Children: 1
- Education: Mississippi State University (BS)

Jim Barach (born March 25, 1956) is an American politician and former weather broadcaster serving as a member of the West Virginia House of Delegates from the 36th district. He assumed office on December 1, 2020. He was not reelected in 2024.

== Early life and education ==
Barach was born in Los Angeles in 1956. He earned a Bachelor of Science degree in geoscience from Mississippi State University.

== Career ==
Barach worked as a television meteorologist for 38 years, including for WFTV, WTVH, WCHS-TV, and WVAH-TV. Barach has also worked as a freelance joke-writer. His material has been published in Newsday and You Don't Say!, a book of sports humor. In 2018, Barach sued Sinclair Broadcast Group, the parent organization of WCHS and WVAH, for alleged age discrimination. Barach was elected to the West Virginia House of Delegates in November 2020 and assumed office on December 1, 2020. He serves as vice minority chair of the House Government Organization Committee.
