= Clive Meredith =

American radio station owner

Clive Burlingame Meredith (February 7, 1892 – April 11, 1932) was an American radio engineer and radio station owner. Meredith served as the founding owner and operator of WSYR in Syracuse, New York. He also assisted the Federal Radio Commission with the developing a means to reduce heterodyne interference between radio stations operating on the same transmitting frequency.

== Early life and education ==
Meredith was born to Eugene Meredith and Gertrude Burlingame Meredith in Syracuse. He was a grandson of diplomat Anson Burlingame and a cousin of author Roger Burlingame. Meredith graduated from the Morristown School (now Morristown-Beard School) in Morristown, New Jersey in 1910. He then attended Harvard University in Cambridge, Massachusetts from 1910 to 1913. Meredith later participated in the Harvard Club of New York.

== Radio operations ==
On September 15, 1922, Meredith launched radio station WMAC from his home in Cazenovia, New York, with the first broadcast featuring music from nationally known harpist Melville Clark. In late 1926 he founded a second station, WSYR, operating from the Hotel Syracuse in nearby Syracuse. In 1930 these two stations were consolidated in Syracuse as WSYR-WMAC.

In 1927, Meredith devised a plan for precise unified control of radio station transmitting frequencies; this plan informed work by the Federal Radio Commission to reduce electromagnetic interference. The following year, Meredith organized WSYR's participation in a national frequency synchronization experiment for the commission. WSYR partnered with four stations also broadcasting on 1020 kHz (294 meters): WTMJ in Milwaukee, Wisconsin, KPRC in Houston, Texas, WODA in Paterson, New Jersey, and WGL in New York City.

Meredith also operated amateur radio station 8AQO with J. Edward Page. In December 1922, this station participated in a transatlantic test of the American Radio Relay League, and was one of 13 radio stations heard by listeners in both England and France.

== Military service during World War I ==
In 1917, Meredith attended the officers' training camp for the U.S. Army in Plattsburgh, New York. After he received a commission of second lieutenant in the infantry, he served at Fort Dix, a military facility near Trenton, New Jersey. In 1918, Meredith transferred to the 307th Machine Gun Battalion of the 78th Infantry Division. He later joined the Aviation Section of the Army Signal Corps as a second lieutenant and sailed for France to serve in World War I on February 26, 1918. Meredith served at the headquarters of the U.S. Army Air Service and then as an officer in charge of supply train.

During the summer, Meredith returned to infantry. The U.S. Army detailed him to the headquarters of the 41st Division and then to the 2nd Machine Gun Battalion of the 1st Infantry Division. Following the conclusion of World War I, Meredith served with the Army of Occupation during the Occupation of the Rhineland.

== Personal life ==
On October 4, 1913, Meredith married Alice Louise Abbot of Pelham Manor, New York, who was related to the Roosevelt family. They divorced in 1914 and they both remarried. His second wife was Jean Jeffrey Smedberg.

Meredith died in an Albany, New York hospital on April 11, 1932, after a car accident. According to reports, he was a passenger in a car struck by another car near Selkirk, New York, in the evening of April 10. Meredith was thrown from the vehicle and run over by a third car, suffering punctured lungs. He died the next morning in the hospital.
