= Jean Daugherty =

American television personality (1922–2008)

Jean Burnett Daugherty (March 5, 1922, in Barnesboro, Pennsylvania – April 6, 2008, in Syracuse, New York) wrote, produced, and acted in more than 6,000 episodes of the pioneering children's television program Magic Toy Shop spanning nearly 30 years. She is the sister of former Michigan State University football coach Duffy Daugherty.

== Early life ==
A graduate of Barnesboro High School, she received a bachelor's degree from Indiana State Teacher's College (now Indiana University of Pennsylvania) in 1943. In 1944, she joined the SPARS, the women's branch of the U.S. Coast Guard. In 1948, she received a master's degree in communications from Syracuse University.

== Magic Toy Shop ==
Daugherty began her television career in Cleveland, Ohio. In 1948 she joined WHEN-TV (now WTVH-TV) in Syracuse, New York in 1948. On the Magic Toy Shop children's program, she was "The Play Lady". She produced all 6,200 episodes of the WTVH show broadcast between 1955 and 1982. In 1998, she wrote Magic Toy Shop: Memories to Cherish, a limited-edition book tracing the history of the program. Much of the history and props from the series are now in the Onondaga Historical Association.

== Community activity ==
Jean Daugherty was a founder of the Board of Literacy Volunteers and worked with the Inter-religious Council. She was a member of the board of the Syracuse Children's Chorus and the Alibrandi Catholic Center at Syracuse University. She was a member of the Friends of the Burnet Park Zoo and Historic Onondaga Lake. In 1990, she was co-marshal of the St. Patrick's Day Parade.

== Awards and honors ==
She was among the first inductees of the Syracuse Press Club Wall of Distinction. Syracuse University awarded her the Woman of Achievement Award, the All-Time Woman of Achievement and Distinguished Alumni Award. She received the Mayors Achievement Award and an Honorary Letter of Distinction by the Syracuse University Varsity Club. In 1976, Indiana University of Pennsylvania gave her an honorary doctorate of letters degree. LeMoyne College gave her a similar honorary degree in 1991.
