= Jennet Conant =

American writer

- Born: Jennet Richards Conant; July 15, 1959 (age 67); Seoul, South Korea
- Education: Bryn Mawr College; Haverford College; Columbia University
- Occupations: Non-fiction writer, journalist
- Spouse: Steve Kroft
- Children: John
- Writing career
- Period: 1982–present
- Subject: World War II
- Notable works: Tuxedo Park (2002); 109 East Palace (2005); The Irregulars (2008)

Jennet Conant (born July 15, 1959) is an American non-fiction author and journalist. She has written five books about World War II, three of which have appeared on the New York Times Best Seller list: Tuxedo Park: A Wall Street Tycoon and the Secret Palace of Science that Changed the Course of WWII, 109 East Palace: Robert Oppenheimer and the Secret City of Los Alamos, The Irregulars: Roald Dahl and the British Spy Ring in Wartime Washington, and A Covert Affair: Julia Child and Paul Child in the OSS.

== Biography ==
Born in Seoul, South Korea, and raised in Asia and America, she received a BA degree (cum laude) in Political Theory from Bryn Mawr College in 1982, and double-majored in philosophy at Haverford College. She completed a master's degree in journalism from New York City's Columbia University in 1983. She was awarded a John J. McCloy Fellowship to study politics in Germany.

Conant went on to work at Newsweek magazine for seven years, and wrote profiles for Rolling Stone, Spy magazine, and The New York Times. Additionally, she was a contributing editor for Esquire, GQ, and Vanity Fair, from which she resigned to write her first book, Tuxedo Park. Her profile of James Watson, the co-discoverer of the double-helix, was featured in The Best American Science & Nature Writing 2004.

She lives in New York City and in Sag Harbor, New York. She is married to the journalist Steve Kroft. They have one son.

Conant is the granddaughter of James Bryant Conant, noted chemist and President of Harvard University.

== Books ==
- Tuxedo Park: A Wall Street Tycoon and the Secret Palace of Science that Changed the Course of World War II (2002), based in part on her family's role in World War II, explores the hitherto unknown story of lawyer, scientist, and New York financier Alfred Lee Loomis and his role in the development of radar technology during World War II.
- Her second book, 109 East Palace: Robert Oppenheimer and the Secret City of Los Alamos (2005), is an account of the history, science, politics and struggles surrounding the building of the atomic bomb. It includes insights from the author's grandfather, James B. Conant, who was an administrator for the Manhattan Project. In 2006, it won the Spirit of the West Award for literary achievement in nonfiction.
- The Irregulars: Roald Dahl and the British Spy Ring in Wartime Washington (2008) is about the structure, history, development, implications, and influence of British espionage in the United States before, during and immediately after World War II. Her history of the organization known as British Security Coordination (BSC) chronicles the exploits of a charm brigade that included such recruits as Roald Dahl, Ian Fleming and David Ogilvy as well as the head of BSC, William Stephenson. It was selected as Amazon Best Book of the Month September 2008.
- A Covert Affair: Julia Child and Paul Child in the OSS (2011) is about the experiences of Julia Child and Paul Child as members of the Office of Strategic Services (OSS) in the Far East during World War II and the later years when they were caught up in the McCarthy Red spy hunt in the 1950s.
- Man of the Hour: James B. Conant, Warrior Scientist (2017) is a biography of Conant's grandfather James B. Conant, a prominent chemist, president of Harvard University, and ambassador to Germany. A review in the journal Nature (journal) called it a "welcome" take on James Conant's life, emerging "at a salutary moment," and said that Jennet Conant "is a fine writer."
- The Great Secret: The Classified World War II Disaster That Launched the War on Cancer (2020) discusses a 1943 air attack on Bari, Italy; in the aftermath, sailors sat for hours in clothing soaked in oil containing mustard gas. In the subsequent investigation of the bombing, Lt. Col. Stewart Alexander noticed the effect of the mustard gas on white blood cells, sparking later research into chemotherapy. A review in the New York Times was lukewarm, saying "As intriguing as all this might sound, the telling is hobbled in several fundamental ways."
- Conant, Jennet (2023-10-31). Fierce Ambition. W. W. Norton. ISBN 978-0-393-88212-4.

== Reception ==
Conant has been widely praised by critics. Kirkus Reviews hailed Tuxedo Park as "Remarkable and remarkably told, as if F. Scott Fitzgerald had penned Batman." Jonathan Yardley in a Washington Post review of The Irregulars said that "As was true of her excellent first book, Tuxedo Park, in The Irregulars she removes the dust of history from a forgotten but important figure to be reckoned with before and during the war."
