= Channel 6 branded TV stations in the United States =

The following television stations in the United States brand as channel 6 (though neither using virtual channel 6 nor broadcasting on physical RF channel 6):

- KECY-DT3 in El Centro, California
- KEQI-LD in Dededo, Guam
- KONG in Everett, Washington
- WGEM-DT2 in Quincy, Illinois
- WGGB-DT2 in Springfield, Massachusetts
- WRUF-LD in Gainesville, Florida
- WSTM-DT2 in Syracuse, New York

The following television stations in the United States formerly branded as channel 6:

- WSTQ-LP in Syracuse, New York
- KASW in Phoenix, Arizona
- KMIR-TV in Palm Springs, California
- WCNC-TV in Charlotte, North Carolina
