= WWHT =

Radio station in Syracuse, New York

Coordinates: 42.956°N 76.110°W

Syracuse, New York; United States
- Broadcast area: Central New York
- Frequency: 107.9 MHz (HD Radio)
- Branding: Hot 107.9

Programming
- Format: Top 40 (CHR)
- Affiliations: Premiere Networks

Ownership
- Owner: iHeartMedia; (iHM Licenses, LLC)
- Sister stations: WBBS; WHEN; WSYR; WSYR-FM; WYYY

History
- First air date: 1956
- Former call signs: WONO (1956–1979); WRRB (1979–1988); WRHP (1988–1993); WHEN-FM (1993–1996)
- Call sign meaning: "Hot"

Technical information
- Licensing authority: FCC
- Facility ID: 57842
- Class: B
- ERP: 50,000 watts
- HAAT: 152 meters (499 ft)

Links
- Public license information: Public file; LMS
- Webcast: Listen live (via iHeartRadio)
- Website: hot1079.iheart.com

WWHT (107.9 FM, "Hot 107-9") is a radio station that is licensed to Syracuse, New York. The station is owned by iHeartMedia and broadcasts a contemporary hit radio (CHR) format. The studios and offices are located on Plum Street in Syracuse while its transmitter is located near Sentinel Heights south of Syracuse.

It broadcasts in HD Radio.

== History ==
The station signed on the air as WONO in 1956, with a classical music format. In 1979, the station's new owner, Roy H. Park Broadcasting, changed its call sign to WRRB and installed a country music format. Over the next decade and a half, 107.9 FM has changed formats and call letters several times; these formats included adult contemporary, album-oriented rock, easy listening/classical (as WRHP), and country (as WHEN-FM, "Hit Country 108").

In 1996, WHEN-FM was sold to Cox Communications, owners of country format competitor WBBS (B104.7). On June 10 of that year, the station flipped to contemporary hit radio (CHR) with new call letters WWHT. WWHT was one of a group of five stations included in a trade between Cox and Jacor Communications in 1999 when Cox exited the Syracuse market. Clear Channel Communications (now iHeartMedia) subsequently acquired Jacor in April 1999. While classified as a mainstream CHR and playing mainstream pop and rock, WWHT focused heavily on rhythmic and dance hits.

In 2010, WWHT added more rhythmic songs and reduced non-rhythmic content, a trend that several Top 40 stations were adopting at the time, and by January 2011 had shifted completely to Rhythmic Top 40. This resulted in WWHT being moved from the Mainstream Top 40 reporting panels of both Nielsen BDS and Mediabase panels to their respective rhythmic panels in November 2011. In October 2012, WWHT returned to Mainstream Top 40, dropping almost all rhythmic-only content, but because most of the station's programming was voice-tracked, Nielsen BDS did not include its playlist in its Top 40/CHR panel. The station airs Elvis Duran and the Morning Show originating from Z100 In New York City every weekday morning, On Air with Ryan Seacrest, On the Move with Enrique Santos, Most Requested Live with Romeo, and AT40 from iHeartMedia's Premiere Networks.

== HD Radio ==
WWHT broadcasts in HD Radio and had up to three subchannels until the other two were turned off:

- WWHT-HD1 is a digital simulcast of the analog FM signal.
- WWHT-HD2 broadcast "iHeart90s", a commercial-free all-1990s hits channel from the iHeartRadio streaming radio platform. The HD2 subchannel served as the originating station for this service. The HD2 subchannel has since been turned off.
- WWHT-HD3 broadcast "iHeart2000s", a commercial-free all-2000s hits channel from the iHeartRadio streaming radio platform. The HD3 subchannel has since been turned off.
