= Lee Goldberg (meteorologist) =

American television meteorologist

- Born: October 4, 1972 (age 53)
- Education: B.S. Cornell University
- Occupation: Meteorologist
- Spouse: Jessica Goldberg
- Children: 2

Lee Goldberg (born October 4, 1972) is Chief Meteorologist at New York City's WABC-TV, where he anchors Eyewitness News Accu-Weather coverage at 4pm, 5pm, 6pm and 11pm. He has been at WABC-TV since July 1996. He also serves as Senior Meteorologist for ABC News.

== Career ==
Goldberg began his career in broadcast meteorology as a private weather forecaster, where he reported for utilities and ski areas. He also worked as a weather agent for radio stations in Canada and the United States at the same time.

He earned his B.S. in meteorology at Cornell University in 1994. At this time, he interned at WCVB-TV and WHDH-TV, both in Boston. He began his career at WTVH-TV in Syracuse, New York, starting just in time to cover the infamous Blizzard of 1993, which heavily impacted central New York. He was hired full-time after graduating from college. He remained there for two years, long enough to report on the winter of 1995-1996 that buried Syracuse in more than 15 feet of snow.

On July 23, 1996, Goldberg appeared on Good Morning America, as a substitute for Sam Champion, whom Goldberg replaced at WABC-TV in 2006. Since September 28, 1996, he has appeared in the local broadcasts, formerly as the station's weekend forecaster.

== Personal life ==
Lee was born to a Jewish family and resides in Somers, New York with his wife Jessica and their two children, Emily (born 2000) and Ethan (born 2002). He graduated from Canton High School, in Canton, Massachusetts, in 1990.
