= Maureen Green =

American broadcast journalist and real estate agent

Maureen Green (born June 6, 1957) is an American real estate agent and former broadcast journalist who was a news anchor on WTVH-TV in Syracuse, New York from 1982 until 2007. Green's show attained top television ratings in its marker throughout the 1980s and 1990s, attaining a "50 share".

Green is included on the Syracuse University Newhouse School of Public Communication's Wall of Distinction and holds a Lifetime Achievement Award from the Syracuse Press Club,

In December 2007, WTVH, newly emerged from bankruptcy protection and owned by a hedge fund, eliminate Green's position. Green became a Guest Columnist and Contributing Writer for the Syracuse Post-Standard newspaper before relocating to Massachusetts.

Today Green sells residential real estate in Cape Cod, Massachusetts. She also runs a lifestyle and real estate website and blog. Green's sales techniques using mobile technology were mentioned in The Wall Street Journal in December, 2013.

Green has four children. Each year Green brought her children on camera during the New York State Fair remote broadcasts.
