= WHEN (AM) =

- Syracuse, New York; United States
- Broadcast area: Syracuse metropolitan area
- Frequency: 620 kHz
- Branding: Power 620

Programming
- Format: Urban adult contemporary
- Affiliations: Premiere Networks

Ownership
- Owner: iHeartMedia, Inc.; (iHM Licenses, LLC)
- Sister stations: WBBS; WSYR; WSYR-FM; WWHT; WYYY

History
- First air date: 1941
- Former call signs: WAGE (1941–1954)
- Call sign meaning: the word "when"

Technical information
- Licensing authority: FCC
- Facility ID: 7080
- Class: B
- Power: 5,000 watts (day); 1,000 watts (night)
- Transmitter coordinates: 43°5′32.24″N 76°11′20.73″W
- Translator: 101.7 W269DT (Syracuse)
- Repeater: 106.9 WSYR-FM-HD2 (Solvay)

Links
- Public license information: Public file; LMS
- Webcast: Listen live (via iHeartRadio)
- Website: power620.iheart.com

WHEN (620 kHz "Power 620") is a commercial AM radio station in Syracuse, New York. WHEN airs an urban adult contemporary radio format and is owned by iHeartMedia, Inc. The station carries The Steve Harvey Morning Show and the Keith Sweat Hotel, which are syndicated by iHeart subsidiary Premiere Networks. The offices and studios are on Plum Street in Syracuse.

WHEN is powered at 5,000 watts by day, using a non-directional antenna. To avoid interfering with other stations on AM 620, WHEN reduces power at night to 1,000 watts and uses a directional antenna. The transmitter is off Old Liverpool Road in Liverpool. Programming is also heard on 50 watt FM translator W269DT at 101.7 MHz. It is also simulcast on the HD radio subchannel of WSYR-FM-HD2 at 106.9 MHz.

== History ==
=== WAGE ===
WHEN first signed on in 1941 as a 1,000-watt daytimer, started by local real estate agent Frank Revoir, under the call sign WAGE. At first it operated as a Mutual Broadcasting System network affiliate. Then it carried the NBC Blue Network and stayed with that service when it became ABC.

By the mid-1940s, WAGE got permission to broadcast at 1,000 watts around the clock. Daytime power was increased to its present 5,000 watts in 1949, while remaining at 1,000 watts at night.

=== Switch to WHEN ===
In 1954, the station was acquired by the Meredith Corporation, founder of WHEN-TV, the city's first television station, which had signed on in 1948. AM 620 became WHEN, sharing the television station's call letters. WHEN became an affiliate of the CBS Radio Network, replacing WFBL, and began airing middle of the road music with a sizable news staff. This was part of a five-station agreement that also saw KCMO-AM-TV and WOW-AM-TV switch network affiliations to CBS, as a compensation for the loss of Phoenix station KPHO-TV's CBS affiliation; WHEN-TV was already the CBS television affiliate in Syracuse.

In the 1970s, the station became famous for playing a jingle during the testing of the Emergency Broadcast System, a practice that was outlawed by the Federal Communications Commission by the end of the decade. This jingle version was spoofed by the band Negativland in the song "It's All In Your Head FM". The producer of the song was Jerry Moss.

=== 1970s and 1980s ===
During the 1970s and 1980s, WHEN became a dominant station in the Syracuse metropolitan area, once again affiliating with ABC for world and national news. Under the ownership first of Meredith Corporation and then of the Roy H. Park organization (Park Communications), WHEN regularly topped the ratings in prime 18-49 demographic by offering a full-service personality adult contemporary format with a 24-hour-a-day, 7 day a week newsroom operation.

WHEN was one of the pioneer adult contemporary stations in the country during the early 1970s. It was aimed specifically at young adult listeners who had grown up with the first generation of rock music and still enjoyed upbeat contemporary songs, but had begun to regard most top 40 stations as too juvenile in their presentation. The station blended an adult presentation with up-tempo music and full service information elements, serving as a model for other stations seeking a similar audience, along with format pioneers like WGAR in Cleveland, WGR in Buffalo and WNBC in New York City. The formula kept WHEN a market leader for a decade and a half, until late in the 1980s when many music listeners began moving to FM.

=== Sports talk ===
In the early 1990s, WHEN changed to a talk and sports format. In addition to daytime talk shows, the station featured play-by-play of Buffalo Bills football, Syracuse Chiefs minor league baseball and Syracuse Crunch AHL hockey.

In 1999, the station was bought by Clear Channel Communications, a forerunner of current owner iHeartMedia. Clear Channel also owned WHEN's chief news/talk competitor WSYR, so WHEN became an all-sports station, allowing WSYR to concentrate on local news and talk programming. WHEN kept its schedule of Bills, Chiefs and Crunch play by play, and aired syndicated sports shows.

=== Power 620 ===
On December 22, 2010, WHEN changed its format to urban adult contemporary, branded as "Power 620". The format change preceded abandonment of the format on co-owned WPHR-FM, which switched to a simulcast of WSYR on the FM band to fill in areas in Syracuse's western, southern and eastern suburbs where WSYR's AM directional signal pattern provides poor coverage.

The station uses the slogan "Central New York's Only R&B". An FM translator at 101.7 MHz was added to broadcast WHEN programming on the FM dial in Syracuse and its adjacent suburbs.

== Translator ==
Call sign	Frequency	City of license	FID	ERP (W)	Class	Transmitter coordinates	FCC info
W269DT	101.7 FM	Syracuse, New York	140439	50	D	43°3′1.2″N 76°9′0.7″W	LMS
