= Steve Kroft =

American journalist (born 1945)

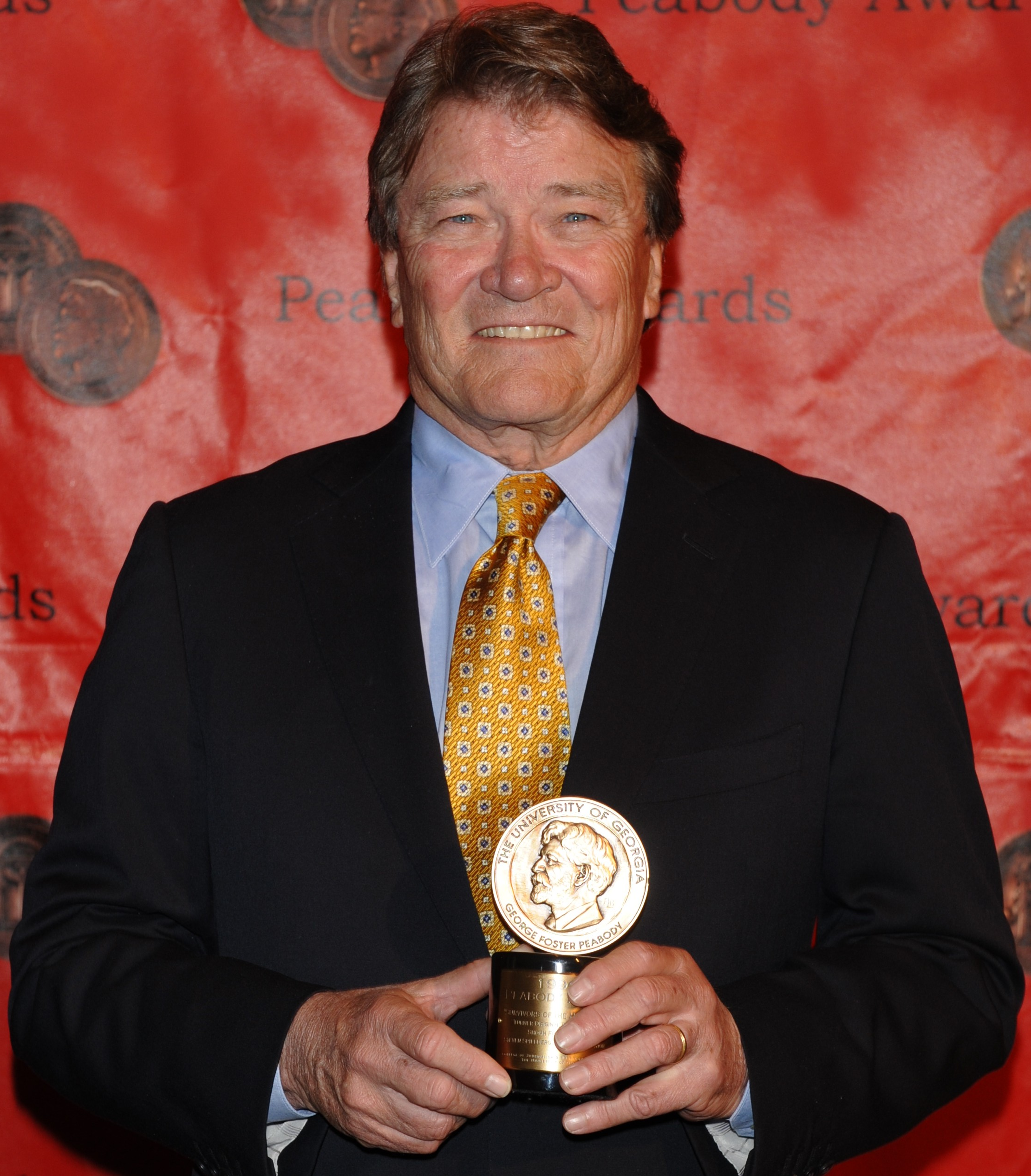
- Kroft at the 69th Annual Peabody Awards in 2010
- Born: August 22, 1945 (age 81); Kokomo, Indiana, U.S.
- Education: Syracuse University (BA); Columbia University (MS)
- Occupation: Journalist
- Years active: 1971–2019
- Spouse: Jennet Conant
- Children: John Conant Kroft
- Website: www.stevekroft.tv

Stephen F. Kroft (born August 22, 1945) is an American retired journalist who was a longtime correspondent for 60 Minutes. His investigative reporting garnered widespread acclaim, winning him three Peabody Awards and nine Emmy awards, including one for Lifetime Achievement in 2003.

== Biography ==
=== Early life ===
Kroft was born on August 22, 1945, in Kokomo, Indiana, the son of Margaret and Fred Kroft. Kroft attended Syracuse University, where he earned his bachelor's degree from the S. I. Newhouse School of Public Communications in 1967. At Syracuse, he was a member of Kappa Sigma fraternity. He also worked at The Daily Orange and radio station WAER.

After his graduation, he was drafted into the United States Army and served in the Vietnam War. He was assigned to the 25th Infantry Division in Cu Chi, where he was a reporter for the Armed Forces Network; he covered the division's participation in the invasion of Cambodia. Kroft won several Army journalism awards for his work and a Bronze Star for Meritorious Achievement. When the division was redeployed, he was reassigned to the military newspaper Stars and Stripes as a correspondent and photographer.

Shortly after receiving an honorable discharge from the army in 1971, he began his broadcast journalism career as a reporter for WSYR-TV in Syracuse, New York. Kroft returned to academics in 1974, enrolling at the Columbia University Graduate School of Journalism and earning his master's degree in 1975. Upon graduation Kroft moved to Florida, where he worked for two stations owned by the Washington Post Company. As an investigative reporter for WJXT in Jacksonville, his reports on local corruption led to several grand jury investigations and established his reputation. In 1977 he moved to WPLG-TV in Miami, where his work came to the attention of CBS News.

=== CBS career ===
Kroft joined CBS News in 1980 as a reporter in its Northeast bureau, based out of New York City. The next year, he was named a correspondent and the network soon moved him to its Southwest Bureau in Dallas, where he stayed until 1983. That year, Kroft returned to Florida after CBS reassigned him to its Miami bureau. He was soon making frequent visits to the Caribbean and Latin America, covering the civil war in El Salvador and the U.S. invasion of Grenada.

In 1984, Kroft landed a job as a foreign correspondent at the CBS London bureau, where he traveled extensively to cover stories in Europe, Africa, Asia, and the Middle East. Many of his assignments involved international terrorism and sectarian violence, including the hijackings of TWA Flight 847 and Achille Lauro, the Rome and Vienna airport attacks of the Abu Nidal Organization, the Lebanese Civil War, and the violence in Northern Ireland. His report for the CBS Evening News on the assassination of Indira Gandhi won him an Emmy. In 1986, CBS News brought Kroft back to the United States to become a principal correspondent on a new magazine show called West 57th. He stayed in that position until the program was cancelled in the spring of 1989.

That September, Kroft and Meredith Vieira, a West 57th colleague, joined 60 Minutes. In 1990, he became the first American journalist to be given extensive access to the contaminated grounds of the Chernobyl nuclear facility, and his story won an Emmy. After allegations of infidelity surfaced in the 1992 presidential election, then-Governor Bill Clinton and his wife, Hillary, gave an exclusive interview to Kroft. The interview was one of the defining moments in the election.

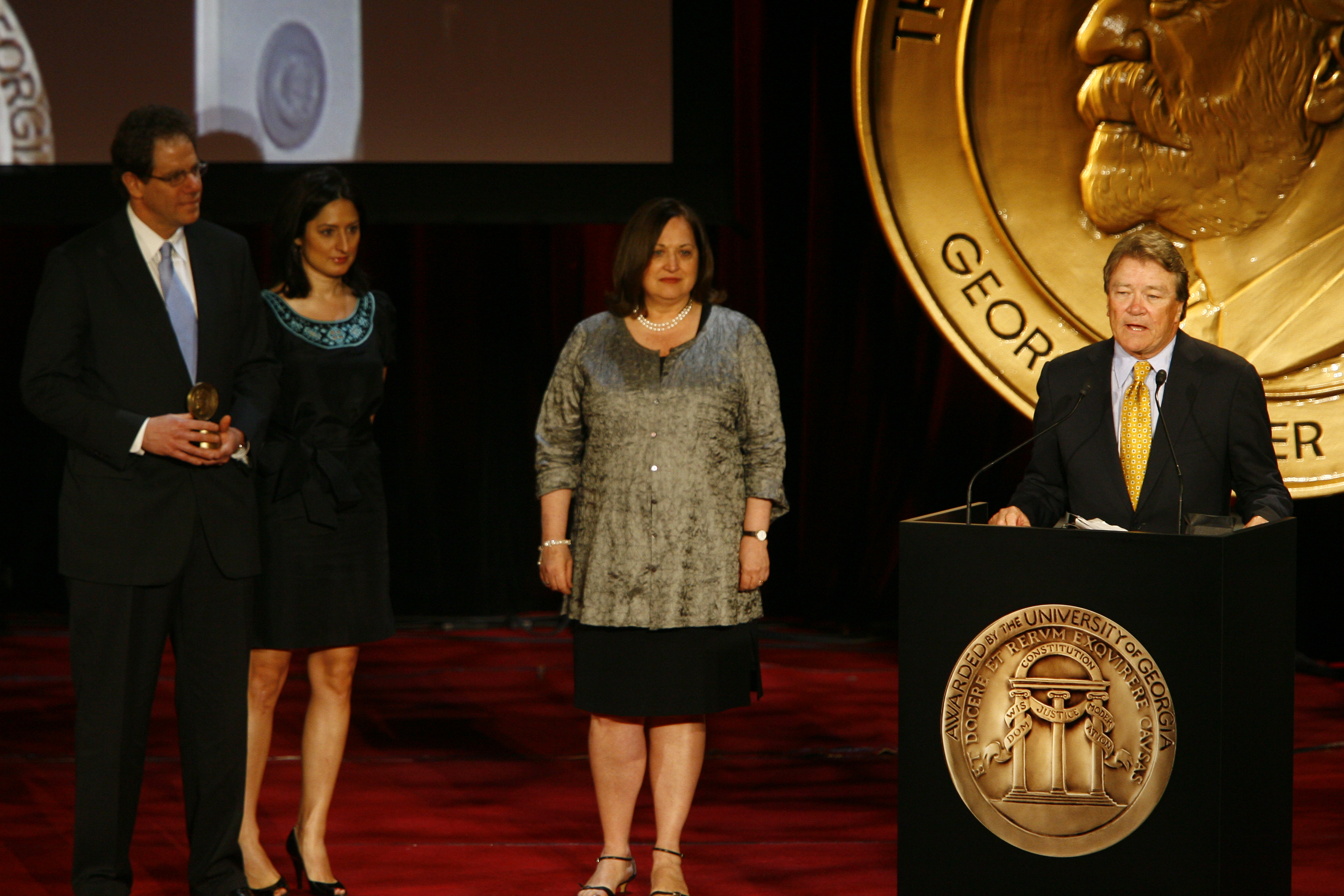
Andy Cort, Maria Gavrilovic, Stephanie Palewski and Steve Kroft for 60 Minutes: "The Co$t of Dying" at the 69th Annual Peabody Awards

Kroft continued to file groundbreaking reports for 60 Minutes. A 1992 segment which detailed a friendly fire incident in the Gulf War won him his first Peabody Award. Two of Kroft's stories in 1994, a profile of Senator Bob Dole and an exposé on the Cuban government's quarantine policy for people infected with AIDS, won Emmy awards. In 2003, he and the rest of the 60 Minutes team were awarded Emmys for lifetime achievement.

Kroft asked Clint Eastwood how many children he has while interviewing the highly secretive actor in 1997. When Eastwood responded "I have a few," Kroft broached the subject with a declarative question: "Seven kids with five women, right?"—actually a conservative estimate, but at the time an unprecedented statement. Eastwood did not answer and stared at Kroft in silence for 30 seconds.

In May 2019, The Hollywood Reporter disclosed Kroft would retire from 60 Minutes on May 19, 2019, his 30th season on the show.

=== Presidential interviews ===
Kroft has been corrected by Gallup.com on public opinion he cited while interviewing U.S. President Barack Obama on December 13, 2009. He stated in the interview that "Most Americans right now don't believe this war's worth fighting". He then questioned President Obama, about why he was conducting the war without public support. Gallup Editor in Chief Frank Newport challenged his statement and presented data, that indicated that Americans were split on the War in Afghanistan.

In March 2009, Kroft asked Obama, who was laughing while discussing the recession, "Are you punch drunk?"

Regarding the interview of Obama and Hillary Clinton on January 27, 2013, Conor Friedersdorf of The Atlantic argues that Steve Kroft's softball interview technique diminishes 60 Minutes. Peggy Noonan, in a column titled "So God Made a Fawner" in The Wall Street Journal, says that Kroft's interview was as "soft as a sneaker full of puppy excrement."

== Personal life ==
Kroft lives in New York City with his wife, Jennet Conant, who is a journalist and author. They have one son, John Conant Kroft.

=== Extramarital affair ===
In 2015, the National Enquirer broke news of an affair involving Kroft and New York City attorney Lisan Goines, a woman 28 years his junior. Kroft later admitted to and apologized for the affair publicly.

=== Popular culture ===
He appeared as himself on an episode of Murphy Brown. He played himself again in Woody Allen's 2000 movie Small Time Crooks, in which he interviewed Allen's character for a segment on 60 Minutes.

== Awards ==
- 11-time Emmy Award winner including a Lifetime Achievement Emmy in 2003
- 5-time Peabody Award winner
- 2-time Columbia University DuPont Award winner
- 1992: George Arents Medal, the highest honor given to a Syracuse University alumnus
- Honorary Doctoral degrees from Indiana University; Binghamton University; and Long Island University.
- 2007: Medallion of the University, the highest honor given by the University at Albany.
- 2007: Gerald Loeb Award for Television Enterprise business journalism for "The Mother of All Heists"
- 2009: List of George Polk Award Winners
- 2009: Gerald Loeb Award for Television Breaking News business journalism for "Economic Crisis: House of Cards"
- 2010: Paul White Award, Radio Television Digital News Association
- 2014: Gerald Loeb Award for Personal Finance business journalism for "60 Minutes: 40 Million Mistakes"

== See also ==
- New Yorkers in journalism
