= WSYR-TV =

Television station in Syracuse, New York

- Syracuse, New York; United States
- Channels: Digital: 17 (UHF); Virtual: 9
- Branding: News Channel 9

Programming
- Affiliations: 9.1: ABC; for others, see § Subchannels

Ownership
- Owner: Nexstar Media Group; (Nexstar Media Inc.)

History
- First air date: September 9, 1962
- Former call signs: WNYS-TV (1962–1978); WIXT (1978–1982); WIXT-TV (1982–2005)
- Former channel number: Analog: 9 (VHF, 1962–2009)
- Call sign meaning: Syracuse; adopted from WSYR radio

Technical information
- Licensing authority: FCC
- Facility ID: 73113
- ERP: 105 kW; 285 kW (CP)
- HAAT: 402 m (1,319 ft)
- Transmitter coordinates: 42°56′42″N 76°1′27″W

Links
- Public license information: Public file; LMS
- Website: www.localsyr.com

WSYR-TV (channel 9) is a television station in Syracuse, New York, United States, affiliated with ABC. Owned by Nexstar Media Group, the station maintains studios on Bridge Street (off NY 290) in East Syracuse (a village of DeWitt), and its transmitter is located on Sevier Road in Pompey, New York.

WWTI (channel 50) in Watertown operates as a semi-satellite of WSYR-TV. As such, it clears all network programming as provided by its parent and simulcasts most of WSYR-TV's newscasts, but airs a separate offering of syndicated programming; there are also separate station identifications and commercial inserts. WWTI maintains its own studios on Court Street in downtown Watertown.

== History ==
Channel 9 was the last of Syracuse's major network affiliates to sign on, doing so September 9, 1962, after a channel shuffle involving rival WHEN-TV (now WTVH) and Rochester's WROC-TV allowed a third analog VHF station in Syracuse. The original callsign was WNYS-TV. It signed-on under the ownership of a group of local investors. The station has always been an ABC affiliate. Channel 9's original studios were located in the basement of the Shoppingtown shopping center on Erie Boulevard in DeWitt. Fire overtook the studios in April 1967, forcing the station to temporarily move to WCNY-TV (channel 24)'s studios in Liverpool until its facilities were rebuilt.

In 1969, then-owner W. R. G. Baker Television Corporation applied for a WNYS-TV translator on channel 7, W07BA; this facility, serving Syracuse and nearby Nedrow, came on the air in 1972. W07BA, which later moved its second city of license to DeWitt, remained a repeater of channel 9 until 2014; its license was canceled on March 24, 2014. The station was purchased by The Outlet Company in 1971.

=== First call sign change ===
The Outlet Company sold WNYS in 1978 to WNYS Acquisition Corp., which was a joint partnership of Coca-Cola's New York bottling division and former Washington Post president Larry H. Israel. The call sign was then changed to WIXT on March 1 with "IX" standing for Roman numeral 9. The Ackerley Group bought the station in 1982 and the -TV suffix was added to the WIXT calls. The station moved its studios to the current location on Bridge Street in 1985.

In 1999, WIXT-TV implemented a digital central-casting control hub for Ackerley's New York State cluster that also included WOKR in Rochester, WWTI in Watertown, WIVT in Binghamton, WETM-TV in Elmira, and WUTR in Utica to help with the upcoming digital television transition. The central-casting still exists today; however, now that Nexstar owns WSYR-TV as well as most of the other stations in New York State that were previously owned by Ackerley, the hub is in the process of being relocated to now-sister-station WWLP in Springfield, Massachusetts. Other stations throughout Ackerley's New York cluster have received updated studios.

=== Second call sign change ===
Clear Channel Communications (now iHeartMedia) bought Ackerley in 2001, putting WIXT-TV under the same ownership as WSYR radio (570 AM). The call sign was then changed to the current WSYR-TV on June 13, 2005. The change caused a small amount of confusion, as the WSYR-TV call letters had last resided on rival NBC affiliate WSTM-TV from its sign-on in 1950 until its sale to the Times Mirror Company in 1980. The callsign WIXT was moved to sister station WLFH in Little Falls, New York. This was part of a strategy that Clear Channel would use the older callsign for an existing TV station they co-owned with the radio stations, the others were WOAI-TV in San Antonio and WHAM-TV in Rochester.

On April 20, 2007, Clear Channel entered into an agreement to sell its entire television division to Newport Television, a broadcasting group established by Providence Equity Partners. WSYR radio was not part of the sale as it remains owned and operated by iHeartMedia. Nevertheless, the WSYR-TV callsign was retained.

WSYR-DT2 was affiliated with the Variety Television Network (operated by Newport Television) until its demise in early-January 2009. This station once served on cable as the default ABC affiliate in Northern New York State communities such as Ogdensburg, Potsdam, Massena, and Malone. Since then, most of those areas have been replaced with WSYR-TV's sister station and fellow ABC affiliate WWTI. However, both were available in these markets for a short time with WVNY from Burlington, Vermont now serving Malone.

On July 19, 2012, Newport Television announced the sale of WSYR-TV and all of its stations in New York State except WXXA-TV in Albany and WHAM-TV in Rochester to the Nexstar Broadcasting Group as part of a 22-station deal that involved Nexstar, Sinclair Broadcast Group and Cox Media Group. The transaction was completed on December 3.

== Programming ==
=== Past programming preemptions and deferrals ===
In October 1987, WIXT decided to preempt ABC's airings of Full House in order to air first-run syndicated airings of Silver Spoons, feeling the latter show was of superior quality.

=== Bridge Street ===
In 2004, WIXT-TV premiered the area's only locally produced daytime talk/entertainment/lifestyle magazine show known as Bridge Street (named from the address of the studios). The program airs weekdays at 10 a.m. from a secondary set. In July 2008, 46-year station veteran Mike Price retired. The station's news studio was renamed the "Mike Price Studio" on July 9 in dedication to his work on Bridge Street. On December 29, Maureen Green (a former WSYR-TV anchor) was featured as a substitute co-host on Bridge Street filling in for Rick Gary. This was the first time Green was seen on the airwaves since being fired from her position at WTVH as main weeknight anchor in December 2007.

On March 20, 2009, Keith Kobland (former weekday morning and noon anchor on WTVH until its consolidation with WSTM-TV) joined Carrie Lazarus to co-host Bridge Street filling in for Rick Gary. On April 24, WSYR-TV announced that Rick Gary had left the station after serving for more than two decades. Dan Cummings and Keith Kobland joined Carrie Lazarus as temporary replacements until February 1, 2010, when Bridge Street was relaunched with a new look hosted by Chris Brandolino with an occasional guest. The show was then hosted by TeNesha Murphy and Sistina Giordano as of January 2017. Murphy left the station in 2020. On September 1, 2020, WSYR Sports Director Steve Infanti joined Sistina Giordano as co-host.

=== News operation ===
By the early 1980s, channel 9 rose from third to first place in the Syracuse ratings, and it has remained there more or less ever since. Coinciding with this ratings growth, work commenced on a new facility on Bridge Street in East Syracuse in 1985. Construction was completed in 1986 and WIXT-TV moved there soon afterward. In 2000, a new news set and newsroom built by NewSet debuted. Also that year in response to declining ratings, WIXT-TV began a new segment called "Your Stories". This feature is where viewers can call the station, not an automated phone system, and get right on-line with a staffer for help with questions. The most popular topics are turned into segments which air at 5:16 during the weeknight news at 5. "Your Stories" was reinvented in 2007 when WSYR-TV started the "Consumer Protection Unit". This is divided into three different parts: "Your Stories", "The Real Deal", and "Consumer Reports".

While WSYR-TV remains number one in Nielsen ratings in Central New York for the whole day-part, it has spent much of the new millennium in a spirited battle with WSTM-TV on weekday mornings and weeknights at 11. WSYR-TV makes up for this with huge leads during the week at noon, 5, 5:30, and 6. With the consolidation of WTVH and WSTM-TV on March 2, 2009, there has been a noticeable decline in viewership especially on WTVH which now only airs separately-branded newscasts on weeknights with the same coverage. As a result, WSYR-TV has seen increased viewership. Currently, there are only three news operations that cover the area including cable-only Spectrum News.

Sister station WWTI in Watertown was hit by across the board cuts from Newport Television in June 2009. Eventually, it began simulcasting WSYR-TV's newscasts every night at 11 and added half-hour reports from the Buffalo Bills training camp produced by fellow ABC affiliate and sister station WHAM-TV in Rochester. On September 8, 2009, WWTI began simulcasting WSYR-TV's weekday morning and nightly 6 o'clock newscasts. After letting go the few on-air news staff that it had, the station became a news bureau of WSYR-TV with contributions of content from the North Country from a single reporter.

On September 7, 2010, WSYR-TV added a prime time newscast weeknights at 10 on WSYR-DT2. However, unlike the hour-long weeknight and half-hour weekend broadcasts on low-power CW affiliate WSTQ-LP (produced by WSTM-TV), WSYR-DT2's newscast only airs live for the first fifteen minutes and is then repeated four times in the 10 p.m. hour. The station also added a half-hour to the weekday morning show, which now starts at 4:30, becoming the first station outside of New York City to make such a launch. WSYR-TV was an affiliate of CNN Newsource, but in a late-2008 cost-cutting move Newport Television chose to terminate all station affiliations with the network. That leaves ABC NewsOne as its lone source of national and world material.

Weekday and weekend live newscasts that air on the main channel are repeated on WSYR-DT2 with the exception of the weekend news at 6 p.m. and 11 p.m. However, when the live news is delayed or preempted altogether by live ABC Sports programming, the newscast is then replaced by another show on WSYR-DT2. The station operates its own weather radar at its transmitter site known as "Live Doppler 9" making it the only local weather radar based in the Syracuse area. The radar is specifically tuned to be more sensitive to displaying lake-effect snow bands, which the station argues may not always appear on the further-out public NOAA National Weather Service radars out of Montague, Binghamton and Buffalo. There is a live streaming video feed of "Live Doppler 9" on its website. WSYR-TV also offers a live video stream of all its weekday newscasts.

On January 29, 2011, WSYR-TV became the first station in Central New York (and until the fall of 2016, the only station in the Syracuse area) to broadcast local news in true high definition. With the switch to HD came a new set, a new logo (which uses the same "Circle 9" design as fellow ABC affiliates WSOC-TV in Charlotte, North Carolina, WTVC in Chattanooga, Tennessee, and KMBC-TV in Kansas City, Missouri, though with the 2007 version of the ABC logo placed on the bottom right side) and a new slogan ("The Local Station"); as a result, the station's logo that was used since 1996 (which was rendered in the FF Meta typeface) was retired. WRGB in Albany, in January 2008, became the first station in upstate New York to broadcast their local newscasts in high definition. In mid-December 2010, WSTM-TV and CBS affiliate WTVH (at the time operated by WSTM-TV) became the first two stations in the market to offer local newscasts in 16:9 enhanced definition widescreen. Although not truly high definition, the broadcasts match the aspect ratio of HD television screens. Both of those stations would ultimately upgrade their local newscasts to true HD on October 23, 2016.

On June 27, 2011, WSYR-TV's 25-year-duo Rod Wood and Carrie Lazarus were inducted into the New York State Broadcasters Association Hall of Fame. As one of the longest-running anchor teams in the United States, their names join those of Walter Cronkite, Barbara Walters and other broadcast legends.

WSYR-TV have previously used many versions of Frank Gari's "News Station" music package including customized vocal versions of the theme using old station slogans, "Making a Difference" and "Central New York's News Source." They used the theme from 1993 until August 19, 2013, in favor of "Aerial" by Stephen Arnold Music.

On January 30, 2018, WSYR-TV received a significant news studio set upgrade.

On April 3, 2023, sister station WUTR in Utica began simulcasting the 5 and 6 a.m. hours of WSYR-TV's morning newscast.

==== Personalities ====
On December 22, 2006, Nancy Duffy, a former general assignment reporter for the station, died after a long illness. She became the first female police reporter in Central New York after joining the Syracuse Herald-Journal in 1966. She was Syracuse's first female television reporter when she moved to WHEN-TV (now WTVH) in 1967. Duffy became the first woman to join the Syracuse Press Club and later served as its president. In 1970, Duffy served as press secretary at Syracuse City Hall. She returned to WHEN-TV after a year and moved to WNYS-TV as a weekday morning anchor and reporter in 1977. She is credited with founding the local St. Patrick's Day parade, formally named the Syracuse St. Patrick's Parade.

On March 2, 2017, Carrie Lazarus transitioned away from anchoring in favor of a special correspondent role. She was replaced by Christie Casciano.

Due to the COVID-19 pandemic, longtime anchor Rod Wood took a leave of absence from WSYR-TV after April 13, 2020's broadcasts. He provided routine updates from home but never returned to the anchor desk and retired just before his 80th birthday in November 2020. Senior reporter Jeff Kulikowsky, who filled in for most of 2020, took the job full-time.

==== Notable former on-air staff ====
- Steve Kroft – reporter (1971–1974)
- Dan Maffei – reporter (1991–1993)
- Jim Rose – sports anchor
- Jeff Rossen – reporter

== Technical information ==
=== Subchannels ===
The station's signal is multiplexed:

Subchannels of WSYR-TV
Subchannel	Res.	Short name	Programming
9.1	720p	WSYR-HD	ABC
9.2	480i	Antenna	Antenna TV
9.3	480i	Bounce	Bounce TV
9.4	480i	Laff	Laff
3.2	720p	CW6	The CW (WSTM-TV)

Broadcast on behalf of another station

On June 15, 2016, Nexstar Broadcasting Group, owners of WSYR-TV, announced that it has entered into an affiliation agreement with Katz Broadcasting for the Escape, Laff, Grit, and Bounce TV networks (the last one of which is owned by Bounce Media LLC, whose COO Jonathan Katz is president/CEO of Katz Broadcasting), bringing one or more of the four networks to 81 stations owned and/or operated by Nexstar, including WSYR-TV. As a result, WSYR-TV renewed its DT3 subchannel's affiliation with Bounce TV and added a new fourth subchannel carrying programs from Laff on August 25, 2016. (At the time of the agreement, Grit was available in Syracuse on WTVH-DT2).

=== Analog-to-digital conversion ===
WSYR-TV shut down its analog signal, over VHF channel 9, on June 12, 2009, the official date on which full-power television stations in the United States transitioned from analog to digital broadcasts under federal mandate. The station's digital signal remained on its pre-transition UHF channel 17, using virtual channel 9.
