= WYYY =

Coordinates: 42.946°N 76.118°W

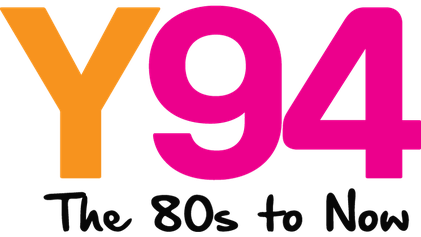
- Syracuse, New York; United States
- Broadcast area: Central New York
- Frequency: 94.5 MHz (HD Radio)
- Branding: Y94

Programming
- Format: Adult contemporary
- Affiliations: Premiere Networks

Ownership
- Owner: iHeartMedia, Inc.; (iHM Licenses, LLC)
- Sister stations: WBBS; WHEN; WSYR; WSYR-FM; WWHT

History
- First air date: 1946 (as WSYR-FM)
- Former call signs: WSYR-FM (1946–1983)
- Call sign meaning: Y94

Technical information
- Licensing authority: FCC
- Facility ID: 48725
- Class: B
- ERP: 100,000 watts
- HAAT: 198 meters (650 ft)

Links
- Public license information: Public file; LMS
- Webcast: Listen live (via iHeartRadio)
- Website: y94fm.iheart.com

WYYY (94.5 FM "Y94") is a commercial radio station licensed to Syracuse and serving Central New York. It broadcasts an adult contemporary radio format, switching to all Christmas music for much of November and December. It is owned by iHeartMedia and has its studios and offices on Plum Street in Syracuse along with sister stations WBBS, WHEN, WSYR, WSYR-FM and WWHT. Evenings, WYYY carries Delilah, a call-in and dedications show, syndicated from co-owned Premiere Networks. The station also carries the weekly syndicated Ellen K show on Saturday mornings.

While most Class B FM stations are limited to 50,000 watts or less, WYYY is grandfathered at an effective radiated power (ERP) of 100,000 watts. The transmitter is on Sentinel Heights Road in Lafayette, New York, near Interstate 81. WYYY broadcasts using HD Radio technology. The HD-2 subchannel formerly ran "iHeart80s," iHeart's all-80s music service. The HD-3 subchannel formerly ran "The Breeze," iHeart's soft adult contemporary music service. The HD subchannels have since been turned off.

== History ==
In 1946, the station first signed on the air as WSYR-FM. It mostly simulcast co-owned WSYR (570 AM). From the late 1940s until the early 1950s, WSYR-AM-FM were affiliates of the NBC Radio Network, carrying its schedule of dramas, comedies, news, sports, soap operas, game shows and big band broadcasts during the "Golden Age of Radio". As network programming moved from radio to television, WSYR-AM-FM switched to a full service middle of the road format of popular music, news and sports.

In the late 1960s, the Federal Communications Commission encouraged AM-FM combo stations to offer separate programming. WSYR-FM switched to an album-oriented rock (AOR) format, calling itself "94 Rock." In 1983, it flipped to adult contemporary music, changing the call sign to WYYY. The format change was quite a surprise as WSYR-FM was one of the top rated stations in Syracuse, playing rock music. It was the first FM station to achieve double digit ratings. But management thought an AC format was a better pairing for the AM station's advertising sales.

In 2007, the station somewhat tweaked the format, playing more soft rock and pop hits from the 1970s, 1980s and 1990s rather than mostly contemporary music. This was to distance itself from hot AC station WWDG, which was a sister station at the time. WWDG was sold off to new owners in 2009.

WYYY is one of the two prominent Christmas music stations in Syracuse (WZUN-FM being the other); WYYY traditionally changes to Christmas music on the second Friday of November.
