= WKOF =

Television station in Syracuse, New York

ATSC 3.0 station
- Syracuse, New York; United States
- Channels: Digital: 15 (UHF); Virtual: 15
- Branding: CBS5; CNY Central

Programming
- Affiliations: 15.1: CBS

Ownership
- Owner: Sinclair Broadcast Group; (WSTQ Licensee, LLC)
- Sister stations: WSTM-TV

History
- First air date: July 22, 2025
- Former affiliations: Roar (July–November 2025)
- Call sign meaning: Joe Koff, former Sinclair executive who died in 2024

Technical information
- Licensing authority: FCC
- Facility ID: 776176
- ERP: 475 kW
- HAAT: 389 m (1,276 ft)
- Transmitter coordinates: 42°56′41.8″N 76°7′6.2″W

Links
- Public license information: Public file; LMS
- Website: cnycentral.com

WTVH
- Syracuse, New York
- Channels: Digital: 18 (UHF); Virtual: 5

Programming
- Affiliations: 5.1: Roar; 5.2: Charge!

Ownership
- Owner: Deerfield Media; (Deerfield Media (Syracuse) Licensee, LLC)
- Operator: Sinclair Broadcast Group

History
- First air date: December 1, 1948
- Former call signs: WJTV (CP, 1948); WHEN (1948–1954); WHEN-TV (1954–1976)
- Former channel numbers: Analog: 8 (VHF, 1948–1961), 5 (VHF, 1961–2009); Digital: 47 (UHF, 2002–2020)
- Former affiliations: Independent (1948); CBS (1949–2025); DuMont (secondary, 1949–1955); ABC (secondary, 1949–1962)
- Call sign meaning: "Television", H has no specific meaning

Technical information
- Licensing authority: FCC
- Facility ID: 74151
- ERP: 109 kW
- HAAT: 392.6 m (1,288 ft)
- Transmitter coordinates: 42°56′41.8″N 76°7′6.2″W

Links
- Public license information: Public file; LMS

WKOF (channel 15), branded as CBS5, is a television station in Syracuse, New York, United States, affiliated with CBS. It is owned by Sinclair Broadcast Group alongside WSTM-TV (channel 3), an affiliate of NBC and The CW. The two stations, collectively branded as CNYCentral, share studios on James Street northeast of downtown Syracuse; WKOF's transmitter is located near Sentinel Heights in the town of Onondaga. Prior to December 1, 2025, CBS programming in Syracuse was supplied by WTVH (channel 5), which is owned by Deerfield Media and operated by Sinclair.

WTVH began broadcasting as WHEN on December 1, 1948. It was Syracuse's first television station, owned by the Meredith Corporation; it broadcast on channel 8 from 1948 to 1961. Meredith owned WHEN alongside WHEN radio; when it sold the radio station in 1976, channel 5 changed its call sign to WTVH. While WTVH was initially the dominant station in Syracuse television news ratings, the market became more competitive in the 1980s.

Granite Broadcasting acquired WTVH in 1993. WTVH's news ratings continued to decline under Granite ownership. In 2009, amid the Great Recession, Granite entered into a multi-city agreement with Barrington Broadcasting, then-owner of WSTM-TV, to combine operations; 40 employees of WTVH were laid off. Sinclair acquired Barrington in 2013, while Granite retained the WTVH license, among its last assets. After winning the authority to build a new Syracuse TV station at federal auction, Sinclair built WKOF in 2025 and moved WTVH's branding and CBS programming to that station, leaving WTVH to broadcast Roar.

== Meredith ownership ==
The Meredith Publishing Company applied on April 22, 1948, to the Federal Communications Commission (FCC) for permission to build a new television station on channel 8 in Syracuse, New York. Meredith had also applied for stations in Albany and Rochester. The FCC granted the application on July 12, 1948, as one of three television permits approved for the city of Syracuse and the only one to a group that was not a Syracuse radio station. The call sign on the permit was originally WJTV but changed to WHEN on November 2. WHEN began broadcasting on December 1, 1948. It originated from a temporary studio while permanent facilities were being constructed and from a temporary 120-foot (37 m) tower while approval for a taller 500-foot (150 m) mast was awaited.

Programs from networks were added shortly thereafter. WHEN became a CBS affiliate on January 1, 1949, an affiliate of the DuMont Television Network by February, and an ABC affiliate in May. WHEN-TV was interconnected with live network television service that December. The second station, WSYR-TV (channel 5), began in February 1950 as an NBC affiliate. (Note: WSYR-TV moved from channel 5 to channel 3 in 1953.) WHEN moved its transmitter from Court Street to Sentinel Heights, 9 miles (14 km) away, in 1952. Meredith acquired Syracuse radio station WAGE in 1954. WAGE had held one of the original television permits, for channel 10, but surrendered it in 1949. WAGE changed its call sign to WHEN, and the television station became WHEN-TV.

WHEN-TV debuted a new children's program—The Magic Toy Shop, hosted by Jean Daugherty—in 1955. Daugherty produced and appeared in 6,200 editions of the program, later known as Corporation on Location, between 1955 and 1982 and served as the station's public affairs director into the 1990s.

In 1961, the FCC authorized a swap of channels 5 and 8 between Syracuse and Rochester. Rochester's channel 5 station, WROC-TV, moved to channel 8, and WHEN-TV moved to channel 5. This facilitated the addition of a third VHF channel allocation to both cities. The changeover took place on September 9, 1962; WROC-TV and WHEN-TV swapped channels. That same day, channel 9 began service as WNYS-TV, an ABC affiliate.

Meredith proposed the construction of a new studio facility for WHEN radio and television in 1960 at 980 James Street. This was less than half a block from the WSYR radio and television facilities at 1030 James Street. At the time, WHEN radio operated from the Loew Building and WHEN-TV from 101 Court Street. The facility was completed in 1963.

In 1976, Meredith sold WHEN radio to Park Broadcasting, necessitating a change in call sign for WHEN-TV. Meredith originally intended to change to WTVZ, but radio station WEZG-FM objected, leading Meredith to propose WTVH instead. The change to WTVH took effect on August 16, 1976.

During most of this time, WTVH was the leading television station in the Syracuse-market news ratings. In the mid-1980s, WTVH and WSTM were trading first-place ratings, with different ratings surveys finding one or the other station on top in the important 6 p.m. and 11 p.m. time slots, but by 1986 WTVH had comfortable leads in both. WTVH was the second station in the market to debut a local morning newscast, in 1990.

== Granite ownership ==
After nearly 45 years, Meredith sold WTVH and KSEE in Fresno, California, in 1993 to Granite Broadcasting. The $32 million transaction gave Granite stations that it had sought for a year and saw Meredith sell WTVH, the oldest station the company owned. After closing on the purchase, Granite and the station's unionized workforce, organized by the National Association of Broadcast Employees and Technicians, entered into a labor dispute that at one point saw six employees fired for allegedly picketing a nearby advertiser.

Granite's ownership ushered in the decline of WTVH's news operation. Between 1993 and 1996, the station had four news directors, lost reporters, and made multiple shuffles of its anchor lineup. It had fired Maureen Green during maternity leave in 1993, only to rehire her three years later after a brief stint at WIXT. WIXT first made inroads in the 5:30–6:30 p.m. time slot where it aired its main early evening newscast.

The news product was rebranded several times during this period. In 1998, WTVH renamed its newscasts Eyewitness News in a bid to promote the station's coverage of breaking news. By 2000, the station was third in every news time slot except noon.

In 2000, longtime anchorman Ron Curtis—who had anchored the 6 p.m. news from 1966 to 1999 before moving over to noon—retired from WTVH after a 41-year career. Curtis died of cancer the next year and was remembered by employees and civic figures. Though Curtis's retirement was not the cause of WTVH's ratings decline, it was considered the most visible symbol of it. Dow Smith, a professor at Siena College, noted in 2009, "[T]hey never figured out what they were going to do after Ron Curtis."

In January 2003, WTVH replaced its 5 p.m. newscast with a news and talk show called Central New York Live! The show was a lifestyle program that included sponsored segments paid for by advertisers, which were not initially fully disclosed to viewers. Live! was a ratings failure and was canceled in May 2004. In 2005, the newscasts were reformatted once again and retitled CBS 5 News. Long-tenured news personalities including Maureen Green (fired again in 2007 after 22 years), Matt Mulcahy (contract not renewed in 2004), and Liz Ayers (moved to public station WCNY-TV in 2005 after 19 years) departed as Granite lowered salaries and hired younger, more inexperienced employees.

The changes did not stem the decline in WTVH's news viewership. Between 1996 and 2003, WTVH lost half the audience for its 6 p.m. news and slipped from second to third place. By 2005, WTVH had fewer viewers from 5 to 6 p.m. than reruns of Judge Judy on WSYT, and by 2006, the only time period in which a WTVH newscast was not in third place or worse was at noon.

In 2000, WTVH replaced WSTM-TV as the news provider for Fox affiliate WSYT (channel 68)'s 10 p.m. newscast. Unlike the previous newscast channel 68 aired, it entirely used WTVH anchors and reporters. Management hoped that offering a newscast on WSYT would draw viewers to WTVH's other newscasts. Ratings for the WTVH-produced newscasts were initially higher than for the ones WSTM had produced. The partnership expanded in January 2005, when WTVH began producing Fox Eyewitness News at 7 a.m. for channel 68. The newscasts aired for nearly six years in total before WTVH opted to end the arrangement effective April 21, 2006, to focus on its own newscasts.

WTVH began broadcasting a digital signal on UHF channel 47 on January 29, 2004. It ceased analog broadcasting with the digital television transition on June 12, 2009.

== Consolidation with WSTM-TV ==
On March 3, 2009, Granite and WSTM-TV owner Barrington Broadcasting entered into a two-city contract by which the companies' stations in Syracuse and Peoria, Illinois, would share news departments and other resources. In Syracuse, WSTM-TV assumed operational control of WTVH under joint sales and shared services agreements, and about 40 employees of WTVH were immediately fired. WTVH continued to have dedicated newscasts; under the new model, WTVH had its own managing editor, but reports would be shared, as would weather and sports personnel. Former WTVH anchor David Muir, who had interned at the station before being hired, wrote in The Post-Standard that the news of WTVH's newsroom shutting down left him "broken", recalling how he had idolized Ron Curtis. For six months, WSTM produced newscasts from the WTVH studios using a transitional team and weather and other content originating from the WSTM studios. Office equipment and other belongings from the WTVH studios were auctioned in September 2009, while the building was still vacant in 2016, when it was sold to a developer for conversion into offices.

Sinclair Broadcast Group acquired Barrington Broadcasting's stations in 2013. Under Sinclair, WTVH received dedicated morning and noon newscasts in 2015, and a weeknight meteorologist was dedicated to the WTVH evening newscasts.

WTVH was the CBS affiliate of record in much of the Utica market for decades. In 1983, CBS denied affiliation with a new Utica station, WTUV, on the grounds that it would not attract enough new viewers from WTVH to be worth it. That status ended in 2015, when Utica NBC affiliate, WKTV, launched a CBS-affiliated subchannel.

=== From WTVH to WKOF ===
In 2022, Sinclair Television Group, Inc., placed the winning bid on a full-power TV station permit in Syracuse, paying $3.137 million. The permit, for channel 15, took the call sign WKOF, and the station began broadcasting on July 22, 2025. Broadcasting as an ATSC 3.0 (NextGen TV) station from the start, it aired Roar, a Sinclair-owned digital multicast television network, on its own transmitter with an ATSC 1.0 simulcast from WTVH, which already offered Roar as a subchannel. A Sinclair representative stated that the WKOF call sign honored former Sinclair and Ring of Honor wrestling executive Joe Koff, who died in 2024.

On December 1, 2025, CBS5 programming moved from WTVH to WKOF, which was described in a station release as a call sign and major channel change (from 5.1 to 15.1), with Roar moving to WTVH 5.1. Granite filed to sell WTVH to Deerfield Media on December 17. The sale was consummated on February 13, 2026.

== Notable on-air staff ==
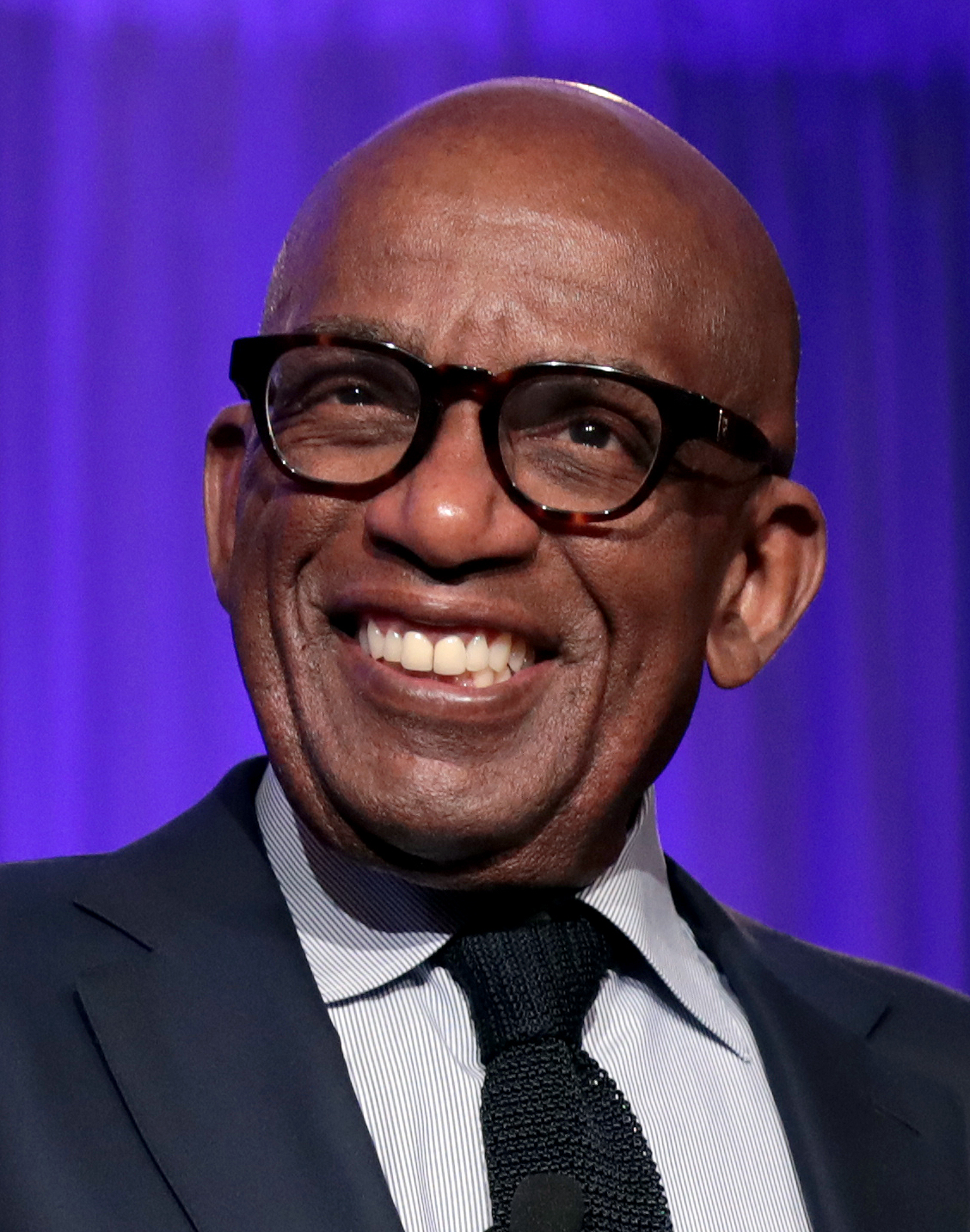
Al Roker

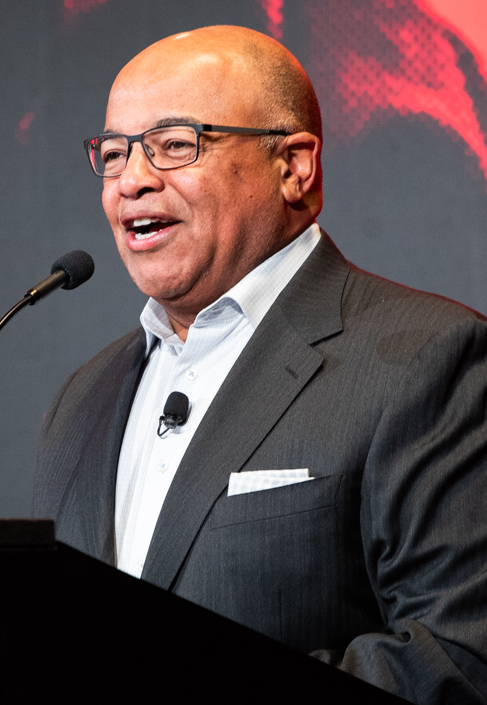
Mike Tirico

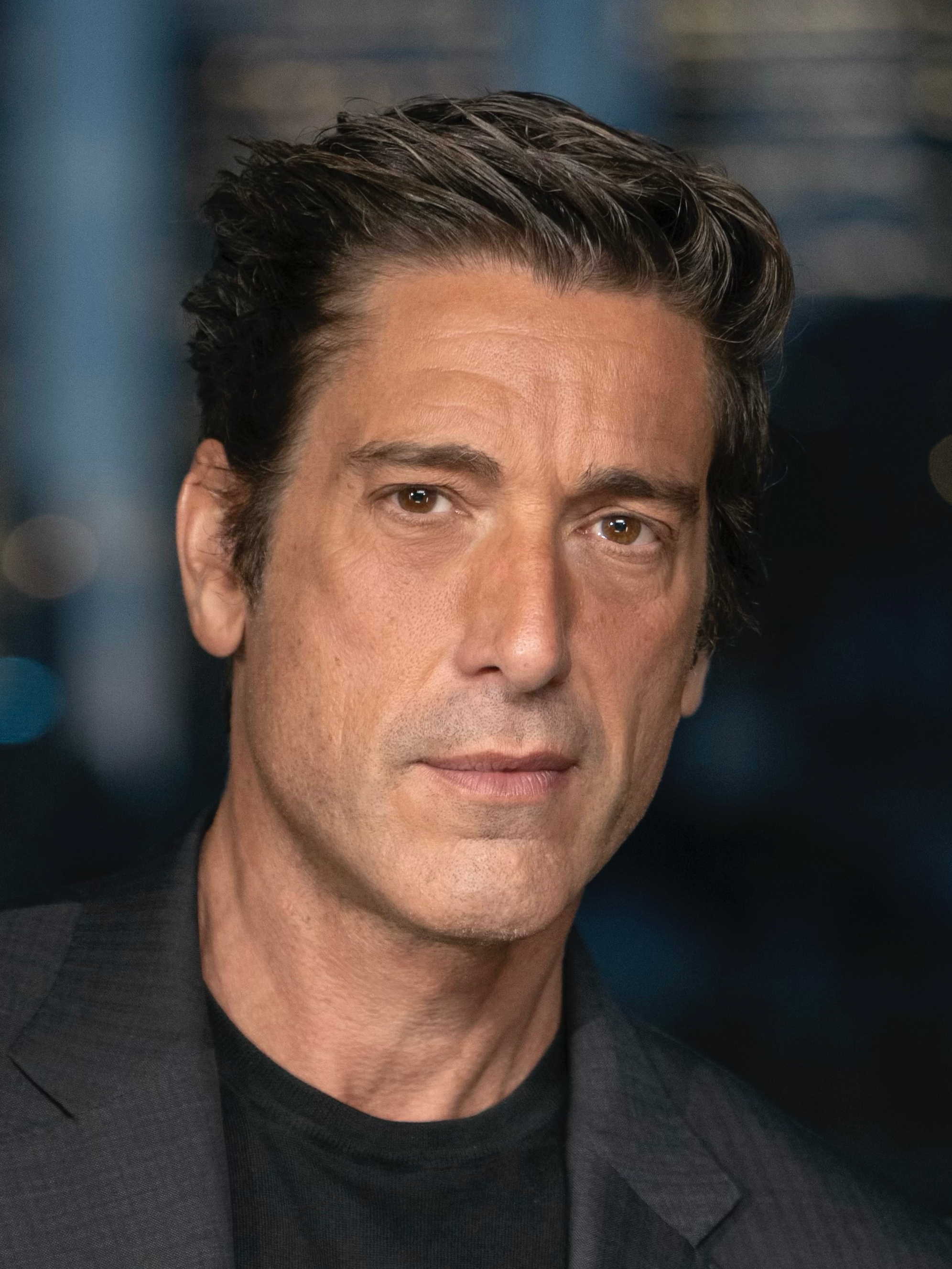
David Muir

Al Roker, then a student at SUNY Oswego, was hired by WHEN-TV in 1974 as the station's weekend weatherman, paid $10 for each of the four weather reports he gave each weekend. The next year, the weeknight weatherman was fired after an on-air gaffe, and Roker was promoted to the weeknight newscasts. In 1976, he left WTVH to work at WTTG in Washington, D.C.

In 1987, WTVH hired Mike Tirico, then still a junior at Syracuse University, as a weekend sports anchor. In 1990, Tirico was promoted to sports director. He departed the next year for a position at ESPN, where he remained until moving to NBC Sports in 2016.

David Muir began as a junior summer intern at the station in 1987. He was hired in 1995 as an anchor and departed in 2000 for WCVB-TV in Boston; three years later, he joined ABC News, which named him anchor of ABC World News Tonight in 2014.

- Jim Barach – morning meteorologist, c. 2003
- Katherine Creag – reporter, 1998–2000
- Tracy Davidson – anchor, 1987–1996
- Lee Goldberg – meteorologist, 1994–1996
- Maureen Green – anchor, 1983–1993 and 1995–2007
- Dan Hoard – sports reporter and anchor, 1991–1995
- Scott MacFarlane – reporter
- Don Morrow – announcer, 1948
- Kathy Orr – meteorologist, 1992–1998
- Bob Van Dillen – meteorologist, c. 1998
- Adam Zucker – sports anchor and reporter, 1998–1999

== Technical information ==
WKOF and WTVH have co-sited transmission facilities near Sentinel Heights in the town of Onondaga, south of Syracuse. WTVH serves as the ATSC 1.0 host station for WSTM-TV and WKOF, which both broadcast in 3.0 format:

Subchannels of WTVH
Subchannel	Res.	Short name	Programming
5.1	480i	ROAR	Roar
5.2	480i	Charge!	Charge!
3.1	1080i	WSTMNBC	NBC (WSTM-TV)
3.3	480i	Comet	Comet (WSTM-TV)
15.1	1080i	WKOFCBS	CBS (WKOF)

Broadcast on behalf of another station

Subchannel of WKOF (ATSC 3.0)
Subchannel	Res.	Short name	Programming
15.1	1080p	WKOF	CBS
