= WSYR (AM) =

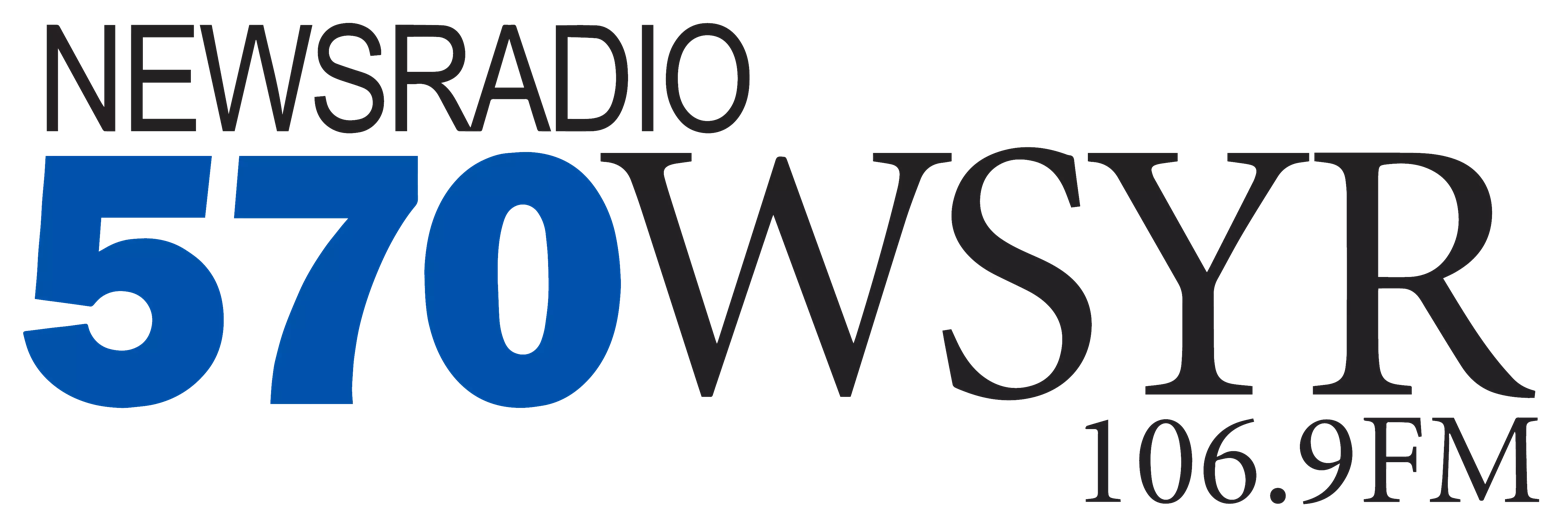
- Syracuse, New York; United States
- Broadcast area: Central New York
- Frequency: 570 kHz
- Branding: Newsradio 570 WSYR

Programming
- Format: News/talk
- Affiliations: Fox News Radio; Compass Media Networks; Premiere Networks; Westwood One

Ownership
- Owner: iHeartMedia, Inc.; (iHM Licenses, LLC)
- Sister stations: WBBS, WHEN, WSYR-FM, WWHT, WYYY

History
- First air date: September 15, 1922; 103 years ago
- Former call signs: WMAC (1922–1930); WSYR (1926–1930); WSYR-WMAC (1930–1933); WSYR-WSYU (1933–1940)
- Former frequencies: 833 kHz (1922-1923); 1150 kHz (1923-1924); 1090 kHz (1924-1926); 850 kHz (1926–1927); 1330 kHz (1927); 1020 kHz (1927–1928)
- Call sign meaning: Syracuse

Technical information
- Licensing authority: FCC
- Facility ID: 48720
- Class: B
- Power: 5,000 watts
- Transmitter coordinates: 42°59′13.24″N 76°9′7.73″W
- Repeater: 106.9 WSYR-FM (Solvay)

Links
- Public license information: Public file; LMS
- Webcast: Listen live (via iHeartRadio)
- Website: wsyr.iheart.com

WSYR (570 kHz) is a commercial AM radio station in Syracuse, New York, and serving Central New York. Owned and operated by iHeartMedia, it broadcasts a news/talk format, calling itself "Newsradio 570 WSYR". The station has simulcast on WSYR-FM (106.9 MHz) in Solvay since January 2011. The studios and offices are on Plum Street in Syracuse.

WSYR transmits with 5,000 watts, using a directional antenna with a three-tower array. The transmitter is off Valley Drive at Dorwin Avenue near Onondaga Creek.

== Programming ==
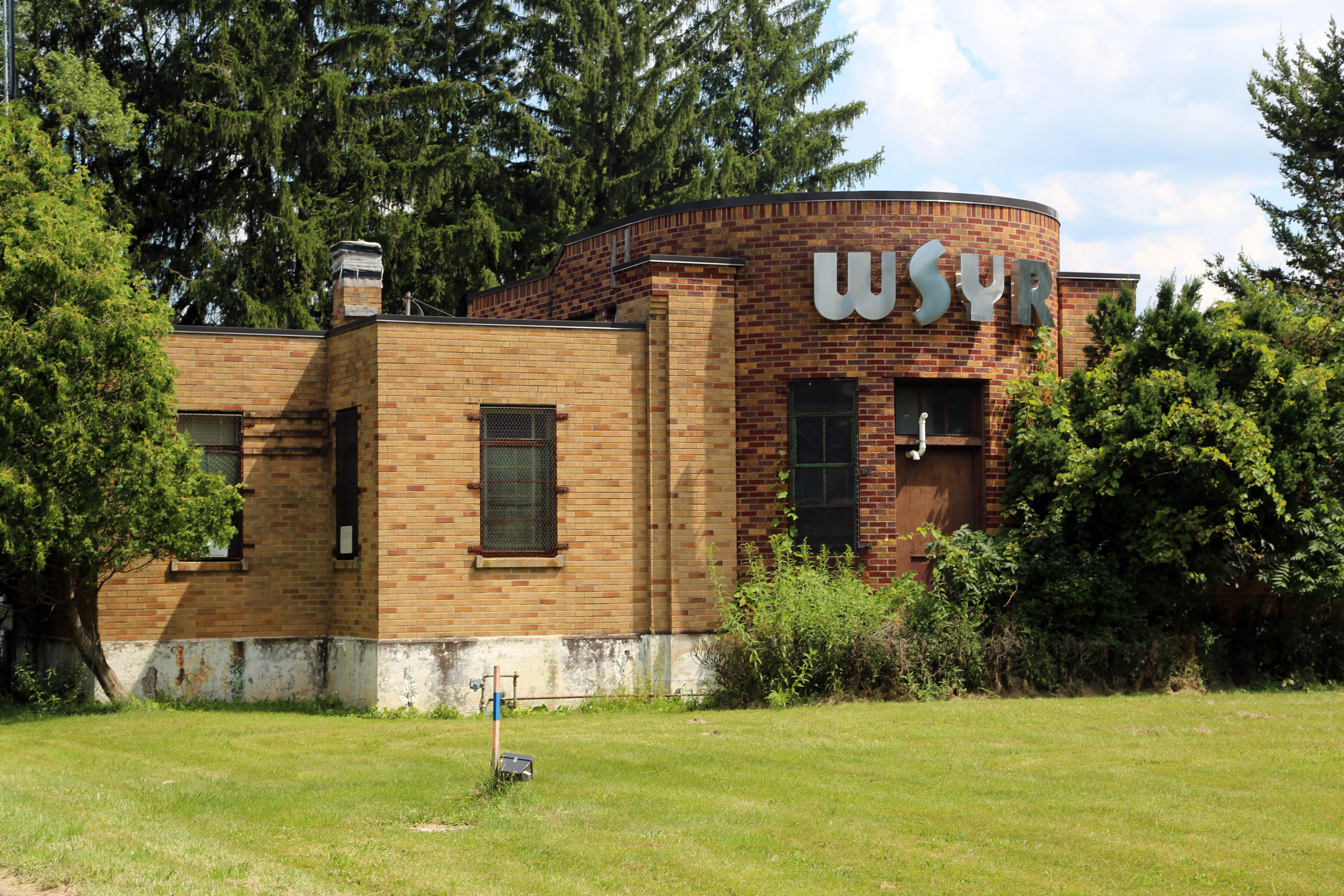
The WSYR transmitter building, on Valley Drive.

Weekday mornings begin with a local news and interview show with Dave Allen. Afternoons are hosted by Bob Lonsberry, who broadcasts his show from the studios of sister station WHAM in Rochester. The rest of the weekday schedule comes from nationally syndicated talk shows, mostly from iHeartMedia subsidiary, Premiere Networks: The Sean Hannity Show, The Glenn Beck Program, The Clay Travis and Buck Sexton Show, and Coast to Coast AM with George Noory. One program from Westwood One is heard weeknights, The Mark Levin Show.

The weekend schedule includes shows on money, cars, home repair and pets, some of which are paid brokered programming. Syndicated shows heard on weekends include The Tech Guy Leo Laporte, At Home with Gary Sullivan, Handel on The Law with Bill Handel, The Weekend with Michael Brown, The Cat's Roundtable with John Catsimatidis and Sunday Night Live with Bill Cunningham. A Sunday morning WSYR talk show with George Kilpatrick ran from 1994 to 2014. Kilpatrick later joined 620 WHEN, an urban adult contemporary station. Another long-running weekend show, The Weeder's Digest with Terry Ettinger, was canceled the same weekend Kilpatrick left WSYR. Most hours begin with world and national news from Fox News Radio.

== History ==
WSYR was first licensed in 1926. However, it has traditionally traced its founding to September 15, 1922, the date when station WMAC, which merged with WSYR in 1930, signed on the air.

=== WMAC ===
WMAC was first licensed in September 1922 to "J. Edward Page '(Clive B. Meredith)'", broadcasting on 360 meters (833 kHz) from Fernwood Street in Cazenovia, New York. The call letters were randomly assigned from an alphabetic list of available call signs.

The next year the station was reassigned to 1150 kHz, and ownership changed to just Clive B. Meredith. The station moved to 1090 kHz in late 1924, and to 1330 kHz in 1927.

=== WSYR ===
WSYR's initial telegraphed authorization was sent to Clive B. Meredith on November 20, 1926, for a station located at the Hotel Syracuse in Syracuse. The station was originally on 850 kHz and shifted to 1330 kHz on June 1, 1927. Beginning in November the station received a year-long series of monthly authorizations to operate on 1020 kHz.

During this time WSYR worked with the Federal Radio Commission (FRC) on a national synchronization experiment aimed at reducing co-channel interference through the use of equipment that provided more precisely controlled transmitter frequencies. For this work WSYR partnered with four other stations broadcasting on 1020 kHz (294 meters): WTMJ in Milwaukee, Wisconsin, KPRC in Houston, Texas, WODA in Paterson, New Jersey, and WGL in New York City.

=== Consolidation ===
With the November 1928 implementation of the FRC's General Order 40, both WMAC and WSYR were assigned to 570 kHz on a timesharing basis, although WMAC was still licensed to Cazenovia. However, on October 31, 1930 the stations were formally consolidated as a single station located in Syracuse, with the call sign WSYR-WMAC. In 1931, the station transmitter was moved to the campus of Syracuse University. The WSYR call sign was used for normal programming, switching to WMAC for programs originating from Syracuse University. In late 1933 the call sign was changed to WSYR-WSYU, with the WSYU call letters now being used for Syracuse University programs instead of WMAC. In mid-1940 the secondary WSYU call letters were dropped, with the station becoming just WSYR.

For decades, beginning in 1948, WSYR was owned by the Newhouse chain alongside the Syracuse Post-Standard and Syracuse Herald-Journal.

=== NBC network ===
For most of its early history, WSYR was an affiliate of the NBC Red Network. It carried NBC's schedule of dramas, comedies, news, sports, game shows, soap operas and big band broadcasts during the "Golden Age of Radio".

In 1946, the owners added an FM station (now 94.5 WYYY) and in 1950, a television station (now WSTM-TV). Because WSYR was an NBC radio affiliate, WSYR-TV joined the NBC television network.

=== Talk radio ===
As network programming moved to television in the 1950s and 1960s, WSYR switched to a full service, middle of the road format of popular adult music, news, sports and talk. In the 1980s, the talk programming increased, and music shows were reduced. By 1990, WSYR was an all-talk radio station.

WSYR and WYYY were acquired by Clear Channel Communications (now known as iHeartMedia) in the 1990s. For a brief time, it had another television sister station when Clear Channel acquired WIXT (channel 9) and brought back the WSYR-TV call letters after a 26-year absence. The new WSYR-TV was sold off along with the rest of Clear Channel's television division in 2007.

=== FM simulcast ===
In late 2010, numerous indications based upon Federal Communications Commission filings, domain registrations, and a format change at a sister station, suggested that WSYR was preparing to launch an FM simulcast on 106.9 MHz. The simulcast became official at 7 p.m. on January 2, 2011, as co-owned WPHR became "Newsradio 106.9 WSYR".

For a time, the FM side gained priority in on-air advertising and on the Web site banner. However, the AM side remained the primary station, and over the next two years most references to the FM side were cut back, to the extent that the station now refers to itself as "Newsradio 570 WSYR, now on 106.9 FM".

For decades, WSYR was the flagship station of the Syracuse Orange football and men's basketball teams. Those games are now heard on classic rock stations WTKW and WTKV, both on FM.
