= WSYR-FM =

News/talk radio station in Solvay–Syracuse, New York

Coordinates: 43.003°N 76.199°W

Simulcast of WSYR, Syracuse
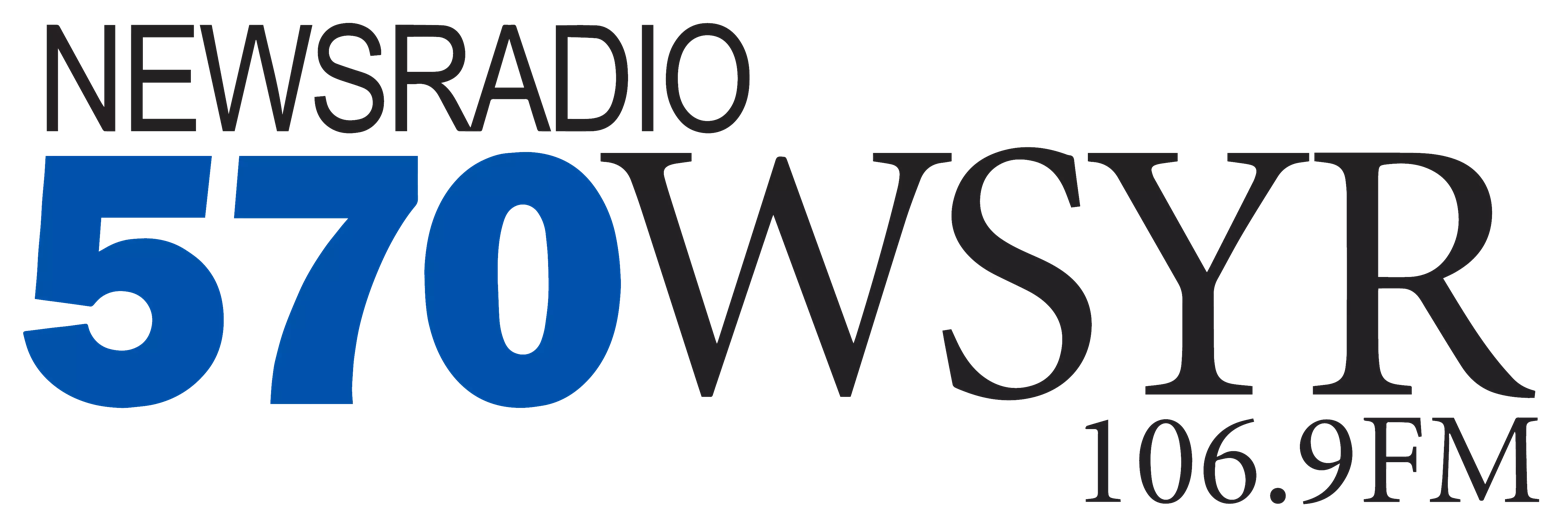
- Solvay, New York; United States
- Broadcast area: Syracuse metropolitan area
- Frequency: 106.9 MHz (HD Radio)
- Branding: Newsradio 570 WSYR

Programming
- Format: News/talk
- Subchannels: HD2: Urban adult contemporary (WHEN simulcast); HD3: Christian worship "Air1"
- Affiliations: Fox News Radio; Compass Media Networks; Premiere Networks; Westwood One

Ownership
- Owner: iHeartMedia, Inc.; (iHM Licenses, LLC)
- Sister stations: WBBS; WHEN; WSYR; WWHT; WYYY

History
- First air date: July 19, 1946
- Former call signs: WMBO-FM (1949–1970); WRLX (1970–1981); WPCX (1981–1997); WHCD (1997–2001); WPHR (2001–2005); WPHR-FM (2005–2011)
- Call sign meaning: Syracuse

Technical information
- Licensing authority: FCC
- Facility ID: 25018
- Class: B1
- ERP: 9,000 watts
- HAAT: 124 meters (407 ft)
- Translators: 101.3 W267AL (Syracuse; relays HD3)

Links
- Public license information: Public file; LMS
- Webcast: Listen live (via iHeartRadio)
- Website: wsyr.iheart.com

WSYR-FM (106.9 MHz) is a commercial radio station licensed to Solvay, New York, and serving the Syracuse metropolitan area and Central New York. Owned and operated by iHeartMedia, it broadcasts a talk radio format, simulcast with WSYR (570 AM) since January 2011. The studios and offices are on Plum Street in Syracuse.

WSYR-FM has an effective radiated power (ERP) of 9,000 watts. The transmitter is off West Seneca Turnpike, on the campus of Onondaga Community College in Syracuse. WSYR-FM broadcasts using HD Radio technology. One of its digital subchannels simulcasts the urban adult contemporary programming of co-owned WHEN. Another subchannel carries Christian worship music from the "Air1" network.

== Programming ==
Weekday mornings begin with a local news and interview show with Dave Allen. Afternoons are hosted by Bob Lonsberry, who broadcasts his show from the studios of sister station WHAM in Rochester. The rest of the weekday schedule comes from nationally syndicated talk shows, mostly from iHeartMedia subsidiary, Premiere Networks: The Sean Hannity Show, The Glenn Beck Program, The Clay Travis and Buck Sexton Show, and Coast to Coast AM with George Noory. One program from Westwood One is heard weeknights, The Mark Levin Show.

The weekend schedule includes shows on money, cars, home repair and pets, some of which are paid brokered programming. Syndicated shows heard on weekends include The Tech Guy Leo Laporte, At Home with Gary Sullivan, Handel on The Law with Bill Handel, The Weekend with Michael Brown, The Cat's Roundtable with John Catsimatidis and Sunday Night Live with Bill Cunningham. Most hours begin with world and national news from Fox News Radio.

== History ==
The original WSYR-FM began operating on July 19, 1946, and the call sign was originally found on 94.5 MHz. That station originally simulcast 570 WSYR. In the 1970s, WSYR-FM carried a largely automated soft rock format. In the 1980s, it switched to adult contemporary music with live DJs. To give it a separate identity from its AM sister station, the FM station switched its call letters to WYYY, calling itself "Y94".

The current WSYR-FM had been licensed for most of its time on air to the city of Auburn, New York. It signed on the air on May 20, 1949, as WMBO-FM. It became WRLX on February 13, 1970. The station was not automated as most beautiful music stations of that era. It used turntables and tape cartridge machines, providing a mostly instrumental format, with one slogan being "Relax with WRLX". (The WRLX call sign is now used by a station in Riviera Beach, Florida, also owned by iHeartMedia.)

In 1981, the station changed its call sign and re-branded as WPCX "Pix 106" and featured Bob Paris in the morning. Paris had been the morning drive personality for WSEN-FM in the 1970s when it featured a country music format. In 1997, the station flipped to smooth jazz as WHCD. By 2000, it switched to urban contemporary. After three years, it evolved into an urban adult contemporary direction, focusing on targeting the African-American community. For the first three years as urban AC, there was no competitor until WOLF-FM flipped to the MOViN format.

On August 28, 2009, at 5 pm, Power 106.9 dropped the Urban AC format for country music, branding itself as "Young Country 106.9". This was despite the fact that station owner Clear Channel Communications already had a country music outlet in the Syracuse area, the market leader 104.7 WBBS in Fulton, a more mainstream country station. The move was ostensibly an effort to hedge its bets against competition from WOLF-FM in DeRuyter, which Clear Channel sold in March 2009 and changed to country music at the same time as WPHR did. As it turned out, the country format on WPHR was a weekend-long stunt. The station switched back to its regular format that Monday morning (August 31). The station, after the stunt, moved to its current location in Solvay, which gives it greater coverage over the city of Syracuse but far less over the Finger Lakes. Coverage was very large in the Central New York area down into Pennsylvania and up into Canada in the 1970s when the station was WRLX. It also ran a subcarrier music program similar to the old style Muzak of those days.

In December 2010, five domains suggesting that 106.9 would be changing to a simulcast of WSYR were registered and parked at GoDaddy. Later discovered, none of those domains were registered/owned by the station or used. WSYR was already simulcasting on WPHR's HD Radio digital subchannel. Concurrently with the discovery, WHEN adopted an identical format and branding as "Power 620". The "Power 106.9" website was rebranded as "Power620.com" at the same time. As of December 27, Clear Channel had filed to swap call signs with WSYR-FM in Gifford, Florida. The format change took effect Sunday evening, January 2, 2011.

For a time, the FM side gained priority in on-air advertising and on the web site banner. At the outset, the simulcast was branded "Newsradio 106.9 WSYR". However, the AM side remained the primary station, and over the next two years most references to the FM side were cut back, to the extent that the station now refers to itself as "Newsradio 570 WSYR, now on 106.9 FM".
