= Daily Sentinel (Rome, New York) =

Newspaper in the Mohawk Valley

- Type: Daily newspaper
- Owner: Sentinel Media Company
- Founded: 1820s (as Rome Telegraph and Democratic Sentinel); 1840s (as Rome Sentinel)
- Headquarters: 111 Langley Rd; Rome, NY 13441
- Sister newspapers: Boonville Herald; Clinton Record
- OCLC number: 14082459
- Website: romesentinel.com

The Daily Sentinel is a newspaper serving the Utica-Rome metropolitan area in Central New York. It is based in Rome, New York and has an office in Utica, New York.

== History ==
Earlier Rome papers in the 1820s sharing the same publisher included the Rome Telegraph and Democratic Sentinel. The two began publishing as the Rome Sentinel (including Rome Weekly Sentinel and Rome Daily Sentinel) in the 1840s. Since 1864, the Sentinel has been family-owned. Through marriage, the name of the owning family has changed from Kessinger to Barnard to Waters.

Since as early as 1855, Sentinel articles, editorials, and photos have been reprinted or used as sources by other papers such as The New York Times, as well as the Associated Press. The Sentinel covered the activities at nearby Griffiss Air Force Base, including the presence of nuclear weapons there, until the closure of Griffiss in 1994.

The Sentinel company founded a radio station, WRUN, which signed on April 24, 1948. WRUN stood for "Rome-Utica News". At the time it applied for permits, the signal from Utica-based competitor WIBX was too weak to reach Rome at night; WIBX upgraded their transmitter soon after. Dick Clark was an announcer at WRUN before becoming a television news anchor at WKTV in 1951. The Sentinel company sold WRUN in 1970. Later, a local FM repeater of WAMC would use the call letters WRUN, and the AM station would rebrand as WUTI, which would become defunct in 2013.

The Sentinel company published the "Clinton Record" from 2018 to 20202, covering the village of Clinton.

In early 2022, the paper rebranded as the Daily Sentinel. Other changes at the same time included switching from carrier delivery to delivery via the U.S. Postal Service, expansion of local news coverage to all of Oneida, Herkimer and Madison counties, and a $1 increase in rates. At that time, publisher Bradley Waters mentioned that the paper had not turned a profit for four years, and expressed hopes that the changes would allow the Sentinel to remain family-owned. Over the following year, the boards of the Utica City School District and the town of New Hartford voted to switch from the Utica-based Observer-Dispatch to the Sentinel as their official newspaper. In its organizing meeting for its 2024 term, the Utica Common Council voted to switch the city's official newspaper to the Sentinel.
