= WAWR =

Air 1 radio station in Remsen–Utica, New York

- Remsen, New York; United States
- Broadcast area: Utica-Rome, New York
- Frequency: 93.5 MHz
- Branding: Air1

Programming
- Format: Christian worship
- Affiliations: Air1

Ownership
- Owner: Educational Media Foundation
- Sister stations: WKVU

History
- First air date: December 1, 1982; 43 years ago (as WIBQ)
- Former call signs: WIBQ (1982–1992); WKDY (1992–1993); WUUU (1993–1996); WRFM (1996–2003); WUCL (2003–2005); WOKR (2005–2015); WARW (2015–2019)
- Call sign meaning: Air 1 WoRship

Technical information
- Licensing authority: FCC
- Facility ID: 465
- Class: A
- ERP: 2,100 watts
- HAAT: 172 meters (564 ft)
- Transmitter coordinates: 43°20′44″N 75°15′00″W

Links
- Public license information: Public file; LMS
- Webcast: Listen Live
- Website: air1.com

WAWR (93.5 FM) is a radio station that broadcasts a Christian worship format and airs programming from the nationally syndicated Air1 feed. Licensed to Remsen, New York, United States, the station serves the Utica–Rome area. The station is owned by Educational Media Foundation.

== History ==
The station signed on the air on December 1, 1982, and ran as an adult contemporary station as WIBQ (B-93.5) until 1992 when it switched format and callsign to WKDY to become "Hot Country KDY 93.5". KDY Country stayed on 93.5 until a frequency swap took place in 1993 between WKDY and oldies-formatted WUUU. WUUU then became "Oldies 93.5".

More than a year later, Norma Eilenberg changed WUUU's format to easy listening and became "Warm 93.5". In 1996, "Warm 93.5" switched its callsign to WRFM. It adopted the slogan "not lite, just right" posing itself a rival to longtime AC Station WLZW (Lite 98.7).

In 1997, Norma Eilenberg sold WRFM along with sister station WSKS to Dame Media and WRFM rebranded as "93.5 Warm FM", but retained the format. A year later, the station began to switch to a Christmas music format between Thanksgiving and Christmas.

In 1999, Dame Media was brought by Clear Channel Communications (now iHeartMedia). Clear Channel retained WRFM's format as "93.5 Warm FM" until December 26, 2002, when it flipped to an oldies format as "Kool 93.5". Its slogan, "Superhits Of The 60's and 70's" posed itself as a competitor to Oldiez 96 (WODZ). Shortly afterward, the station changed calls to WUCL.

Clear Channel attempted to boost coverage in the Utica area with the addition of translator W231BI which was installed on the same Smith Hill tower as then-sister station WOUR. Despite the signal boost for downtown Utica, "Kool 93.5" was no match for WODZ. In December 2004, WUCL changed format to classic hits/adult contemporary and became "93.5 The River" with the slogan "It's All About The Music". One month after the format change Clear Channel changed the station's callsign to WOKR, the former call letters of Rochester's WHAM-TV which was also owned by Clear Channel Communications. The format served as a complement to then-sister station WOUR.

In 2007, Clear Channel decided to exit the small markets such as the Utica-Rome market. Galaxy Communications acquired WOKR and spun off the station, along with its own classic rock station WRCK, to Educational Media Foundation. WOKR then joined the God's Country Radio Network while WRCK joined the Air 1 satellite feed.

WOKR's affiliation with God's Country was made possible by a local marketing agreement between EMF and God's Country Radio Network formed, in June 2008. Under the agreement, both parties agreed that if God's Country Network could satisfy the terms of the LMA (the length of the LMA contract term was not made public), it would eventually assume ownership of both stations.

The following month, EMF requested permission to move WOKR's primary translator to a new site in East Floyd, New York. EMF contended that it would allow WOKR to provide a city-grade signal covering Utica without the need for a translator.

God's Country dissolved in November 2010. EMF changed the affiliations of most of the God's Country affiliates it owned to Radio Nueva Vida, while WOKR took over the Air 1 affiliation from WRCK. In March 2012, WRCK was spun off to Ken Roser, owner of WUTQ and WADR and began simulcasting their programs as WUTQ-FM. The station changed its callsign to WARW on January 7, 2015. On July 19, 2019, EMF moved the WARW call sign to its Air 1 station in Port Chester, New York, with 93.5 becoming WAWR.
