= WVTL =

Radio station in New York (state)

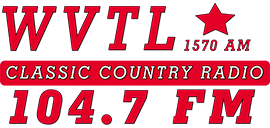
- Amsterdam, New York; United States
- Broadcast area: Mohawk Valley
- Frequency: 1570 kHz
- Branding: Classic Country 104.7 FM and 1570 AM

Programming
- Format: Classic country

Ownership
- Owner: Roser Communications Network, Inc.
- Sister stations: WBUG-FM; WBGK; WUTQ-FM; WSKU; WSKS

History
- First air date: August 16, 1961
- Last air date: January 1, 2026
- Former call signs: WAFS (1961–1967); WKOL (1967–1990); WBUG (1990–2004)
- Call sign meaning: Valley's Talk Leader (prior format)

Technical information
- Licensing authority: FCC
- Facility ID: 72624
- Class: B
- Power: 1,000 watts (day); 204 watts (night)
- Transmitter coordinates: 42°54′38.27″N 74°13′2.47″W
- Translator: (104.7 MHz) W284BZ (Amsterdam)

Links
- Public license information: Public file; LMS

WVTL (1570 AM) was a commercial radio station broadcasting a classic country format to the Mohawk Valley in the U.S. state of New York. It was licensed to Amsterdam, New York, and was owned by Roser Communications Network, Inc. WVTL's studios and offices were in Florida, New York.

By day, WVTL was powered at 1,000 watts, non-directional. As 1570 AM is a Mexican clear channel frequency, WVTL cut its power to 204 watts at night to reduce interference. Programming was also heard on 250 watt FM translator 104.7 W284BZ.

== History ==
On August 16, 1961, the station first signed on as WAFS. It became WKOL in 1967 and WBUG in 1990. The WVTL call sign began to be used in 2004.

In late December 2009, WVTL switched to a soft adult contemporary format. Along with its FM translator station, WVTL was called "Lite 104.7 and 1570 AM". In late February 2016, the station adapted to a classic country format.

In October 2021, Roser Communications agreed to sell the station to Think Tank Media, owners of WENT. The deal was called off in August 2022.

On January 1, 2026, Roser took WVTL silent due to unsustainable cost of operation. The license was surrendered in June 2026. The Federal Communications Commission cancelled the station’s license on July 6, 2026.

== FM translator ==
In addition to the main AM station at 1570 kHz, WVTL was relayed by an FM translator for those who preferred to listen in FM stereo. The FM translator frequency was used as the primary frequency for station branding.

Broadcast translator for WVTL
Call sign	Frequency	City of license	FID	ERP (W)	HAAT	Class	Transmitter coordinates	FCC info
W284BZ	104.7 FM	Amsterdam, New York	142713	250	15.4 m (51 ft)	D	42°54′38.2″N 74°13′2.4″W	LMS
