= WXUR =

Radio station in Herkimer–Utica, New York

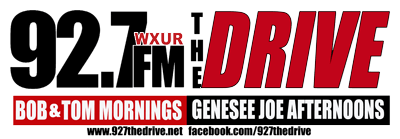
- Herkimer, New York; United States
- Broadcast area: Utica-Rome, New York
- Frequency: 92.7 MHz
- Branding: 92.7 The Drive

Programming
- Format: Classic rock
- Affiliations: Westwood One

Ownership
- Owner: Arjuna Broadcasting Corp.
- Sister stations: WNRS

History
- First air date: 1986 (as WYUT-FM)
- Former call signs: WYUT-FM (1986–1994)

Technical information
- Licensing authority: FCC
- Facility ID: 2761
- Class: B1
- ERP: 6,400 watts
- HAAT: 201 meters (659 ft)
- Transmitter coordinates: 43°03′50″N 75°01′44″W

Links
- Public license information: Public file; LMS
- Webcast: Listen live
- Website: 927thedrive.net

WXUR (92.7 FM, "92.7 The Drive") is a radio station broadcasting a classic rock format. Licensed to Herkimer, New York, United States, the station serves Utica, NY. The station is currently owned by Arjuna Broadcasting Corp. and features programming from Westwood One. The station is an affiliate of the syndicated Pink Floyd show "Floydian Slip."

== History ==
The station signed on as WYUT-FM on March 2, 1986, a simulcast of AM station WALY, which became WYUT in 1987, to match the call letters. On July 20, 1994, WYUT and WYUT-FM returned to the air after a 3-year hiatus and WYUT-FM changed its call sign to the current WXUR, while the AM became WNRS. The station broadcast a satellite oldies format with Don Imus in the morning before switching to Active Rock and bringing in Bill Keeler to handle mornings. The station, which then adopted its current branding of The Drive, switched to Classic Hits then Adult Rock after Galaxy Communications, which formerly owned WRCK (Rock 107), took over WOUR, spun off WRCK to the Educational Media Foundation, and began programming WOUR from Syracuse. WXUR hired former WRCK (Rock 107) morning host Frank McBride to handle afternoons, returned the popular Bob & Tom Show to the market and also added former local radio(WOUR) veterans Tom Starr, Rick Devoe and Alison to the line-up that already included market mainstay Jack Moran. Jerry Kraus, one of the top area personalities and a market mainstay, for many years at WOUR joined the station for weekends in 2012. After Frank McBride's sudden death, WXUR completed the migration down the dial of the WOUR airstaff by hiring 'Genesee' Joe Trisolino to take over the afternoon show.
