= WLZW =

- Utica, New York; United States
- Broadcast area: Utica-Rome
- Frequency: 98.7 MHz
- Branding: Lite 98.7

Programming
- Format: Adult contemporary
- Affiliations: Premiere Networks; Westwood One

Ownership
- Owner: Townsquare Media; (Townsquare Media Licensee of Utica/Rome, Inc.)
- Sister stations: WFRG-FM, WIBX, WODZ-FM, WOUR

History
- First air date: January 1, 1974
- Former call signs: WIBQ (1974–1985); WNYZ (1985–1989)
- Call sign meaning: "Lite and Easy Favorites"

Technical information
- Licensing authority: FCC
- Facility ID: 169
- Class: B
- ERP: 25,000 watts
- HAAT: 201 meters (659 ft)
- Transmitter coordinates: 43.144°N 75.179°W

Links
- Public license information: Public file; LMS
- Webcast: Listen Live
- Website: lite987.com

WLZW (98.7 FM) is a commercial radio station licensed to Utica, New York, United States, and serving the Utica-Rome market. Owned by Townsquare Media, the station carries an adult contemporary format branded as "Lite 98.7". It is part of a cluster with news-talk station WIBX, country-formatted WFRG-FM, classic hits station WODZ-FM, and classic rock-formatted WOUR.

== History ==
The station signed on the air on January 1, 1974. It was a sister station to WIBX 950 AM and ran a beautiful music format using the call sign WIBQ. But in the 1980s, the beautiful music format was starting to attracting only older listeners, while most advertisers seek young to middle aged clients.

Without warning, WIBQ changed its format in 1985 to oldies as "Z 98.7" with the call letters WNYZ. After a while in the format, WNYZ next flipped to a rock-leaning Top 40 format, identifying as "New York's Z-98.7". The format began with Twisted Sister's We're Not Gonna Take It, followed by Quiet Riot's Cum On Feel the Noize. The Top 40 format could not, however, compete against powerhouse Top 40 station Power Hits Rock 107 WRCK. In 1989 the station again changed format. Originally the station planned to join the Z-Rock satellite delivered Heavy Metal format available at the time, but instead flipped to the current Adult Contemporary sound and current call sign WLZW, identifying as "Lite 98.7".

Lite 98.7's call letters WLZW and format are reflected in its first slogan "Lite and Easy Favorites". In its early years, Lite 98.7 competed with rival AC station and market leader KG 104 WKGW (now sister station WFRG). WLZW quickly toppled WKGW from its position, and by 1993 WKGW had flipped to classic rock as WKFM, formerly in Syracuse, taking over the 104.3 frequency.

WLZW was then the only AC station in the Utica-Rome market until the spring of 1994 when WUUU (later WRNY & WUCL, now Air 1 affiliate WAWR) switched frequencies from 93.5FM to 102.5FM with WKDY (later WSKS & WRBY, now WUMX) the previous year, flipped format from oldies to adult contemporary to become "Warm 93.5". While WUUU/WRFM was a softer AC station, WLZW was a bit more upbeat. After over 8 years of competition between the two stations, WRFM flipped format and call sign on December 26, 2002, becoming oldies station WUCL (identified as Kool 93.5) again leaving Lite 98.7 as the only AC station in the market.

This lasted over a year until WRBY flipped to hot AC and call sign to WUMX, identifying as Mix 102.5. In order to compete with WUMX's popular "Christmix 102.5" holiday programming, WLZW began switching to a Christmas Music format in 2009. Traditionally, WLZW switches on or around Thanksgiving Day and continues with holiday music until Christmas Day. In 2015, WUMX tweaked its format to Hot AC and dropped holiday music programming. That left WLZW as the only station in Utica-Rome to broadcast only Christmas music through much of November and December.
