= Interfaith Works (Syracuse) =

US non-profit organization

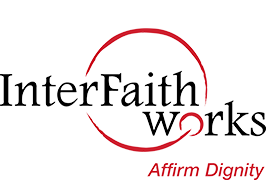
The logo for InterFaith Works of Central New York Founded: 1976 Founders: Type: Non-profit organization Location: 1010 James Street, Syracuse, NY 13203 Services: Resettling refugees, bridging the gap between different races and religions Fields: Protecting human rights Website: https://www.interfaithworkscny.org/

InterFaith Works is a non-profit organization based in Syracuse, New York, that provides help and resources to refugees globally who are fleeing to the Central New York region from war, persecution and famine.

The group's mission statement centers around ideas of respect for people of all backgrounds. It reads, "InterFaith Works affirms the dignity of each person and every faith tradition, builds racial and religious equity, and creates bridges of understanding among us.

== Programs ==
=== Center for New Americans ===
The agency works to resettle refugees from the Middle East, Asia, Africa, and other regions and help them integrate into their new communities by providing English classes, employment preparation, medical case management, mental health services, cultural orientation, referrals and community navigation services.

=== Center for Dialogue and Action ===
Bishop Colette Matthews-Carter leads this program which is an effort to encourage dialogue on racism, race relations and healing to build understanding across racial, ethnic, religious and community differences. The Community-Wide Dialogue to End Racism is the most long-lasting dialogue of its kind initiating discussion for the last 25 years.

=== Center for Healthy Aging ===
This center serves older adults, caregivers who need a break, elder refugees, and active older adults looking for service opportunities to promote activity, socialization and lifelong learning to help older adults live well and age with dignity. InterFaith Works' Director of the Center for Healthy Aging Lori Klivak cited a growing population in Central New York of people over the age of 65 in a multitude of backgrounds including large influxes of both Black and Hispanic people.

== History ==
The organization was founded in 1976 to begin building understanding across racial divides driven by civil rights activity and had heightened after the 9/11 terrorist attacks continuing to serve as a vehicle of hate. InterFaith Works strives to bridge the religions of Catholics, Protestants, Jews, Muslims, Sikhs, Buddhists, Mormons and other faith groups to unite cultures.

InterFaith Works serves the following counties: Cayuga, Onondaga, and Oswego.

InterFaith Works executes multiple social service programs to address the needs of vulnerable, low-income, targets of oppression, and refugees arriving through resettlement programs, fleeing war, political repression, and famine. These programs are meant to serve the community and address the needs of vulnerable populations such as hunger and housing to promote the racial and religious diversity of the region.

The agency actively works with programs associated with Syracuse University. In December 2023, the two collaborated on InterFaith Works’ holiday clothing drive in which Syracuse put out flyers and notices to students making the charitable drive public. InterFaith Works also has hosted refugee education classes including courses on interviewing for jobs.
