= CW 33 =

CW 33 may refer to the following television stations in the U.S. affiliated with The CW:

== Current ==
- KDAF in Dallas–Fort Worth, Texas (O&O)
- KSCW-DT in Wichita, Kansas
- KVCW in Las Vegas, Nevada
- WBFS-TV in Miami, Florida
- WFXV-DT2 in Utica, New York
- WISE-TV in Fort Wayne, Indiana

== Former ==
- KSPR-LD in Springfield, Missouri (2006–2017 and on DT2 from 2017–2021)
