= WYFY =

WYFY may refer to:

- WYFY (FM), a radio station (88.1 FM) licensed to serve Cambridge, Ohio, United States
- WKAL, a radio station (1450 AM) licensed to serve Rome, New York, United States, which held the call sign WYFY from 1999 to 2011
