= WPNY-LD =

Television station in Utica, New York

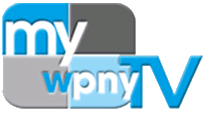
- Utica–Rome, New York; United States
- City: Utica, New York
- Channels: Digital: 11 (VHF); Virtual: 11
- Branding: MyWPNYTV

Programming
- Affiliations: Independent with MyNetworkTV

Ownership
- Owner: Nexstar Media Group; (Nexstar Media Inc.)
- Sister stations: WUTR, WFXV

History
- First air date: January 1, 1988
- Former call signs: W11BS (1988–1995); WUPN-LP (1995–1996); WPNY-LP (1996–2021)
- Former channel number: Analog: 11 (VHF, 1988–2021)
- Former affiliations: Independent (1988–1995); UPN (1995–2006)
- Call sign meaning: "UPN, New York"

Technical information
- Licensing authority: FCC
- Facility ID: 34335
- Class: LD
- ERP: 0.16 kW
- HAAT: 178.6 m (586 ft)
- Transmitter coordinates: 43°8′41.1″N 75°10′32.2″W
- Translator(s): WUTR 20.2 Utica

Links
- Public license information: LMS
- Website: www.cnyhomepage.com

WPNY-LD (channel 11) is a low-power television station in Utica, New York, United States. It is programmed primarily as an independent station, but maintains a secondary affiliation with MyNetworkTV. WPNY-LD is owned by Nexstar Media Group alongside Fox/CW+ affiliate WFXV (channel 33) and co-managed with ABC affiliate WUTR (channel 20). The three stations share studios on Smith Hill Road in Deerfield (with a Utica mailing address), where WPNY-LD's transmitter is also located.

The station broadcast on VHF analog channel 11 until the FCC-mandated shutdown of analog LPTV stations on July 13, 2021. It was licensed for digital broadcasting on the same channel effective July 23, 2021, and began digital operations later that year on November 30. Due to WPNY-LD's very low-power signal, its broadcasting radius only covers the immediate Utica area. Therefore, it is simulcast in high-definition on WUTR's second digital subchannel (20.2)—which transmits from a separate facility on Smith Hill Road, shared with WFXV—in order to reach the entire market.

== History ==
The station signed on January 1, 1988, with the call sign W11BS licensed to Little Falls. It was a low-power translator and general entertainment independent outlet. The station joined UPN as a charter affiliate on January 16, 1995. On December 22 of that year, W11BS upgraded to low-power status and adopted the WUPN-LP calls. However, less than a year later, the station became WPNY-LP after a full power outlet in Greensboro, North Carolina, took the call letters.

At some point in time, WPNY became a sister outlet to WFXV and began to be housed at the latter's facility on Greenfield Road in Rome. In 1996, both stations were sold to Sullivan Broadcasting which would itself be bought out by the Sinclair Broadcast Group only two years later. Instead of being acquired by that company, WPNY and WFXV were purchased by Quorum Broadcasting founded by former Sullivan head Dan Sullivan.

The stations were acquired by current owner Nexstar in 2003. It was announced in December of that year that Clear Channel Communications would sell WUTR to Nexstar partner company Mission Broadcasting. The sale was approved by the Federal Communications Commission (FCC) on April 1, 2004, at which point Nexstar took over operations of WUTR under local marketing and joint sales agreements through the company's operational arrangement with Mission. Although the ABC affiliate was the subordinate entity, WPNY and WFXV were consolidated into WUTR's Deerfield studios.

In 2006, UPN and The WB merged into one network called The CW. Several weeks later, Fox announced the establishment of another network called MyNetworkTV, for the benefit of those UPN or WB affiliates that did not earn a CW affiliation. Since "WBU", the cable-only WB affiliate operated by NBC affiliate WKTV through The WB 100+, was the default choice to take the CW affiliation, WPNY-LP chose to associate with MyNetworkTV, and promptly did so on September 5, 2006.

== Newscast ==
After WUTR's sale to Mission Broadcasting, speculation began circulating that Nexstar would establish a combined news department for WUTR, WFXV and WPNY in order to take on longtime dominant WKTV. Progress was not made until March 31, 2011, when the company announced it would launch a news operation for the three stations by mid-September. Nexstar invested $1 million for new equipment and the hiring of twelve employees.

Eyewitness News at 6, seen weeknights at 6 p.m. on WUTR, was repeated at 7 p.m. on WPNY from September 2011 to September 2017. It was the Mohawk Valley region's only local newscast in its time slot, since there was no such offering on WKTV. The quiet cancellation of this rebroadcast without advance notice left no local news programming on WPNY's schedule.

== Subchannel ==
Subchannel of WPNY-LD
Channel	Res.	Short name	Programming
11.1	720p	WPNY-LP	Main WPNY-LD programming
