= WKAL =

- Rome, New York; United States
- Broadcast area: Utica–Rome; Syracuse, New York
- Frequency: 1450 kHz 103.3 Mhz
- Branding: Magic 103.3

Programming
- Format: Adult Contemporary

Ownership
- Owner: Tune In Broadcasting, LLC

History
- First air date: November 25, 1946
- Former call signs: WKAL (1946–1988); WFRG (1988–1991); WZLB (1991–1993); WFRG (1993); WODZ (1993–1996); WFRY (1996–1997); WODZ (1997–1999); WYFY (1999–2011); WRUY (2011–2012)
- Call sign meaning: Kallet family (original owners)

Technical information
- Licensing authority: FCC
- Facility ID: 72067
- Class: C
- Power: 1,000 watts
- Transmitter coordinates: 43°12′18.3″N 75°28′43.6″W
- Translator: 103.3 W277DR (Rome)

Links
- Public license information: Public file; LMS
- Webcast: Listen live
- Website: wkalradio.com

WKAL (1450 AM) is a radio station licensed to Rome, New York, United States, and serving the Utica–Rome and Syracuse radio markets. The station is owned by Tune In Broadcasting, LLC, a company based in Santa Clarita, California. It broadcasts an automated classic hits format. It had previously broadcast a talk radio format, with an emphasis toward Rome-area sports, and after that a simulcast of WNRS in Herkimer.

== History ==
WKAL signed on November 25, 1946, as a Mutual affiliate owned by the Copper City Broadcasting Corporation. Copper City Broadcasting was itself owned by Myron Kallet, who also controlled a chain of theaters that included the Capitol Theatre in Rome, where WKAL placed its studios. The station was the second station in Utica–Rome, after WIBX (which had already been on the air for two decades). Kallet would also expand into television on December 1, 1949, when WKTV (then on channel 13; later on channel 2) went on the air from Utica.

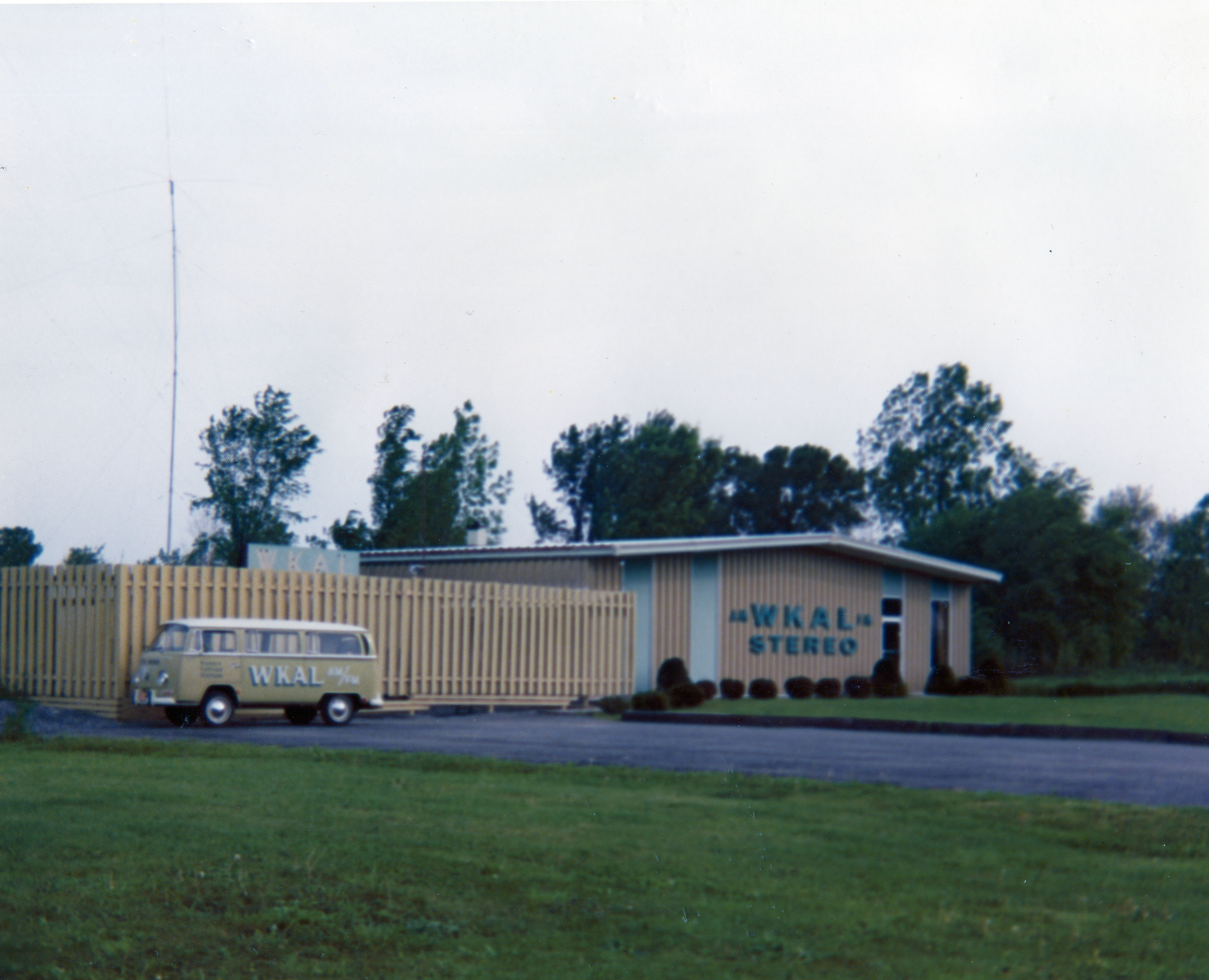
The combined WKAL studio and transmitter facility, South Jay Street, Rome, New York; Spring 1974. FM Stereo service had been recently initiated, simulcasting AM programming. The station's building markings were updated to advertise the change. To the left the station's VW Bus can be seen which was utilized during this period for promotional events. As of 2018, only the concrete pad remains to mark the location where the building once stood.

In 1958, Kallet sold WKAL and WKTV to a group led by Paul Harron and Gordon Gray, who had previously owned WIBG AM-FM in Philadelphia and WPFH in Wilmington, Delaware. The group, Mid-New York Broadcasting, changed the station's affiliation to ABC Radio by 1959; it then sold WKAL to Jackson Maurer, former owner of WHKK in Akron, Ohio, in 1961. The sale separated the station from WKTV, which remained under Harron ownership until 1992. In 1962, WKAL reaffiliated with Mutual; by 1964, the ABC affiliation had ceased, and by 1967, the station's studios had left the Capitol Theatre for its transmitter location on South Jay Street. An FM sister station, WKAL-FM, was started in August 1968 on 95.9 MHz as a simulcast of the AM station. During this time, WKAL's music programming included blocks devoted to middle of the road music, country music, and top 40. In 1977, WKAL-FM dropped the AM simulcast in favor of beautiful music.

Maurer Broadcasting Corporation sold WKAL AM-FM to Wooster Republican Publishing Company of Wooster, Ohio, in 1980. By 1983, WKAL had an adult contemporary format; two years later, the station, along with what had become WTCO, were acquired by Howard Green and Donald Simmons, owner of WENY AM-TV and WLEZ in Elmira and WOND and WMGM FM-TV in Atlantic City, New Jersey. By then, WKAL had an oldies format.

Target Communications bought WKAL and its FM sister station (which had reverted to WKAL-FM) from Green and Simmons in 1987; soon after taking over, on February 1, 1988, the station's call sign was changed to WFRG, and it began simulcasting the "96 Frog" country music format of the FM station, which had become WFRG-FM at 96.1. The AM’s callsign was changed to WZLB on November 29, 1991, as the station began simulcasting an adult standards format with WTLB in Utica; in February 1992, WZLB and WTLB switched to the Satellite Music Network's Kool Gold oldies programming. WZLB's local marketing agreement with WTLB ended on April 1, 1993, and the station returned to simulcasting WFRG-FM; on May 15, 1993, WZLB reverted to the WFRG call sign. Target Communications eventually became Arrow Communications, which went into receivership in 1992; in November 1993, WFRG AM-FM was purchased by Forever Broadcasting, which renamed the stations WODZ and launched an oldies format, with the country format and callsign WFRG-FM moving to 104.3 MHz. The AM’s callsign changed again on November 25, 1996, this time to WFRY; this was to warehouse the callsign for a sister station in Watertown, and the callsign reverted to WODZ on February 14, 1997.

Forever sold the station to the Bible Broadcasting Network (BBN) in 1999; after the sale was completed that May, the station became WYFY, and replaced the simulcast of WODZ-FM with a 24-hour broadcast of BBN's satellite-fed religious programming. BBN sold the station to Tune In Broadcasting in 2011; Tune In chose to return the station to commercial operation, forcing WYFY to leave the air following the completion of the sale on May 6, 2011, as only noncommercial stations can maintain main studios outside of their broadcast area (the former studios at the transmitter site in Rome were demolished). In addition, BBN retained the callsign WYFY; as a result, the station was renamed WRUY, swapping with the construction permit for a BBN station in Cambridge, Ohio. WRUY tested its signal with public service announcements and station identification (which claimed service to the nearby Syracuse market) in late February 2012, but on April 1 the call letters were changed back to WKAL. The station returned to the air again on May 4, 2012, but went silent three days later due to technical difficulties. WKAL again resumed broadcasting on April 24, 2013, with nostalgia programming from the 1920s Radio Network, as well as a station identification announcing that the station was conducting an "engineering test broadcast" and that "a brand new WKAL" would launch soon. However, on May 8, 2013, satellite problems, an interference complaint, and the theft of copper strapping from the station's tower led WKAL to again leave the air.

Following further test broadcasts, WKAL finally resumed regular broadcasts March 11, 2014, providing a mix of lifestyle and regular talk radio (primarily syndicated, along with some drive time local programming), as well as coverage of Rome Free Academy athletics. In 2018, WKAL became affiliated with the Salem Radio Network; it was previously affiliated with ABC News Radio, CBS News Radio, and Cable Radio Networks.

On April 1, 2025, WKAL dropped its talk format and began simulcasting WNRS in Herkimer by arrangement with Arjuna Broadcasting, to allow full-market coverage of WNRS' Spanish language tropical music format. The simulcast ended May 1, 2026, at which point the station began playing an Adult Contemporary format branded at Magic 103.3 WKAL.
