= WNRS (AM) =

- Herkimer, New York; United States
- Broadcast area: Utica, New York
- Frequency: 1420 kHz
- Branding: El Zorro 98.3 FM y 103.3 FM

Programming
- Format: Tropical music
- Affiliations: Premiere Networks

Ownership
- Owner: Arjuna Broadcasting Corp.
- Sister stations: WXUR

History
- First air date: October 12, 1956 (as WALY)
- Former call signs: WALY (1956–1979); WKYZ (1979–1980); WRMV (1980–1985); WLIR (1985–1987); WYUT (1987–1994)
- Call sign meaning: "Winners" (previous format)

Technical information
- Licensing authority: FCC
- Facility ID: 2760
- Class: D
- Power: 1,000 watts day; 64 watts night
- Transmitter coordinates: 43°3′40.25″N 75°1′42.57″W
- Translator: 98.3 W252DO (Herkimer)

Links
- Public license information: Public file; LMS
- Webcast: Listen live (via TuneIn)
- Website: 983elzorroradio.com

WNRS (1420 kHz) is an AM radio station broadcasting a Spanish language tropical music format. Licensed to Herkimer, New York, United States, the station serves the Utica area. Owned by Arjuna Broadcasting Corp., the station also simulcasts on translator station W252DO at 98.3 FM.

Since WNRS must greatly reduce power at sunset, the station also simulcasts in Rome on WKAL (1450 AM) and translator W277DR (103.3 FM) to serve the entire Utica-Rome market, hence its branding as El Zorro 98.3 FM y 103.3 FM.

== History ==
The station went on the air as WALY in 1956, often programming a full service music format. However, on occasion, it would program other formats like top 40. Eventually, the station settled for beautiful music programming. The station changed callsigns several times in the late 1970s and 1980s, to WKYZ in 1979, WRMV in 1980, and WLIR in 1985. On March 2, 1987, the station changed its call sign to WYUT to match its FM sister WYUT-FM, but signed off in 1991. On July 20, 1994, both WYUT and WYUT-FM returned to the air as WNRS and WXUR, respectively. On June 26, 2009, Arjuna Broadcasting Corp. moved the Imus in the Morning show to WNRS from WXUR, which had just flipped to an active rock format.

On March 4, 2013, WNRS dropped its Premiere Networks and Bloomberg Radio affiliations and affiliated with The True Oldies Channel. Imus in the Morning was once again retained (and would continue on WNRS until the show ended on March 29, 2018). When the True Oldies Channel ended in June 2014, WNRS retained its oldies format and changed its affiliation to Good Time Oldies, which had recently been launched by Westwood One.

On December 1, 2016, WNRS added an FM simulcast at 98.3, to cover areas not served by WNRS' nighttime signal.

On November 1, 2020, WNRS dropped its oldies format in favor of Spanish-language tropical music; such a format had never before been heard in Central New York. With the format change came new branding as "El Zorro" - the Spanish word for "Fox".

On April 1, 2025, WNRS began simulcasting in Rome on WKAL and its translator W277DR through an arrangement with Tune In Broadcasting, owners of WKAL and W277DR, allowing for full-market coverage of the format. WNRS' branding was then altered slightly to El Zorro 98.3 y 103.3 FM, emphasizing the FM translators of both WNRS and WKAL.

== Translator ==
Call sign	Frequency	City of license	FID	ERP (W)	Class	Transmitter coordinates	FCC info
W252DO	98.3 FM	Herkimer, New York	60893	250	D	43°3′40.25″N 75°1′42.57″W	LMS
