= John Atkinson (clergyman) =

John Atkinson (December 6, 1835, Deerfield, New York - December 8, 1897, Haverstraw, New York) was an American Methodist clergyman and historian. He wrote histories of Methodism, and the hymn "We Shall Meet Beyond the River".

== Biography ==
He became a preacher at 18 years of age and served in the ministry of the Methodist Episcopal Church. He filled pulpits in New Jersey (Newark, Jersey City); Chicago; Bay City, Michigan; and finally Haverstraw, New York; after another pass through Newark and Jersey City.

== Works ==
Works deriving from his pastoral experience:

- The Living Way (1856)
- The Garden of Sorrows (1868)
- The Class Leader (1875)

Histories:

- Memorials of Methodism in New Jersey (1860)
- The Centennial History of American Methodism, 1784-1816 (1884)
- The History of the Wesleyan Movement in America and of the Establishment Therein of Methodism (1896)
