= WKTV =

Television station in Utica, New York

- Utica–Rome, New York; United States
- City: Utica, New York
- Channels: Digital: 29 (UHF); Virtual: 2
- Branding: 2.1: NewsChannel 2; 2.2: CBS 2 Utica; 2.3: WKTV Plus; 2.4: MeTV Utica

Programming
- Affiliations: 2.1: NBC; 2.2: CBS; for others, see § Subchannels

Ownership
- Owner: Heartland Media; (WKTV Licensee, LLC)

History
- Founded: December 1, 1949
- Former channel number: Analog: 13 (VHF, 1949–1958), 2 (VHF, 1959–2009)
- Former affiliations: All secondary: DuMont (1949–1956); CBS (1949–1956); ABC (1949–1970)
- Call sign meaning: Kallet Television (original owner)

Technical information
- Licensing authority: FCC
- Facility ID: 60654
- ERP: 708 kW
- HAAT: 402 m (1,319 ft)
- Transmitter coordinates: 43°6′8.4″N 74°56′19″W

Links
- Public license information: Public file; LMS
- Website: www.wktv.com

WKTV (channel 2) is a television station in Utica, New York, United States, affiliated with NBC and CBS. Owned by Heartland Media, the station maintains studios on Smith Hill Road in Deerfield (with a Utica postal address), and its transmitter is located in the Eatonville section of Fairfield.

== History ==
The station launched on December 1, 1949, as Utica's first television station, operating on very high frequency (VHF) channel 13. It was the 93rd television station in the United States to sign on. This made Utica one of the smallest cities in the nation with a television station. It was owned by Copper City Broadcasting Corporation, controlled by Myron Kallet, along with WKAL (1450 AM). As the only station in its area, it was affiliated with all four major networks at the time: NBC, DuMont, ABC, and CBS, with NBC having served as its primary affiliation since its inception. It lost DuMont in 1956 following the network's closure, and lost CBS soon afterward following a dispute with the network; after that, WHEN-TV/WTVH in Syracuse served as the default CBS affiliate for the Utica area until 2015.

The station was a major beneficiary of a quirk in the Federal Communications Commission (FCC)'s plan for allocating stations. In the early days of broadcast television, there were twelve VHF channels available and 69 UHF channels (later reduced to 55 in 1983). The VHF bands were more desirable because they carried longer distances and many television receivers lacked optional UHF tuners. Since there were only twelve VHF channels available, there were limitations as to how closely the stations could be spaced.

After the FCC's Sixth Report and Order ended the license freeze and opened the UHF band in 1952, it devised a plan for allocating VHF licenses. Under this plan, almost all of the country would be able to receive two commercial VHF channels plus one noncommercial channel. Most of the rest of the country ("1/2") would be able to receive a third VHF channel. Other areas would be designated as "UHF islands" since they were too close to larger cities for VHF service. The "2" networks became CBS and NBC, "+1" represented non-commercial educational stations, and "1/2" became ABC (which was the weakest network usually winding up with the UHF allocation where no VHF was available).

However, Utica was sandwiched between Albany, New York (channels 4 (later 6) and 10, later joined by 13), to the east, Syracuse (channels 3, 5, and 9) to the west, Binghamton (channel 12) to the south, and Watertown (channel 7) and Burlington–Plattsburgh (channels 3 and 5) to the north. This resulted in the Utica market having only one VHF license; WKTV was fortunate enough to gain that license, and as a result remained the only television station based in Utica for its first 21 years of existence. Although there were no allocations of channels 2, 8, and 11 in the immediate area, channel 2 was occupied in Buffalo, channel 11 was occupied in New York City and Kingston, Ontario, and channel 8 was occupied in New Haven and later Rochester, which were all too close to Utica to reallocate at the time.

In 1951, a young local radio announcer named Dick Clark joined the staff at WKTV. He quickly gathered a loyal following. Clark's father was the manager of Utica radio station WRUN (1150 AM, later to become WUTI and shut down in 2013; and 104.3 FM, now WFRG-FM), and his son wanted to avoid the name recognition factor. To avoid confusion, the younger Clark became known on-air as "Dick Clay". Eventually, Clark would anchor the weeknight newscasts on WKTV (replacing Robert Earle, who would later host the GE College Bowl). In 1952, Clark departed WKTV for WFIL AM-FM-TV in Philadelphia.

In 1958, Kallet sold WKTV and WKAL to a group led by Paul Harron and Gordon Gray, who had previously owned WIBG AM-FM in Philadelphia and WPFH in Wilmington, Delaware. Soon afterward, on January 1, 1959, WKTV moved to VHF channel 2 in a dial realignment, which allowed WTRI (channel 35) in Albany to move to channel 13 (where it became WAST, now WNYT), and (along with the earlier move of a channel 13 allocation in Hamilton, Ontario, to channel 11, becoming CHCH-TV) led to a channel 13 allocation being assigned to Rochester (which signed on in 1962 as WOKR and is now WHAM-TV). With the switch, WKTV upgraded its signal and began to cover a fairly wide area stretching from as far south as the Catskill Mountains, as far east as The Berkshires in Western Massachusetts and into Southern Ontario, Canada. The Harron/Gray group, Mid-New York Broadcasting, sold WKAL in 1961, but retained WKTV, and in subsequent years acquired several additional stations, including KAUZ-TV in Wichita Falls, Texas, and WMTW-FM-TV on Mount Washington, New Hampshire. Harron also operated a chain of cable systems in the Northeastern United States, including a system in Utica, Central New York Cable TV (later Harron Cable TV) built in 1963. The company eventually became known as Harron Communications Corporation.

WKTV enjoyed a monopoly in the Utica television market until February 28, 1970, when WUTR signed on as an ABC affiliate. WKTV then became affiliated solely with NBC, and is now one of the network's longest-serving affiliates. In the mid-1980s, the FCC ruled on cross-ownership of broadcast, cable and print media in the same market. The FCC grandfathered Harron. A few years later Harron acquired a cable system in nearby Canajoharie, New York, then owned by a local appliance dealer. The Canajoharie plant extended well within a 20-mile (32 km) contour of WKTV's Middleville transmitter site. The FCC revoked Harron's grandfather status and required divestiture of either its cable or television assets in the region. In 1992, Harron sold controlling interest in WKTV to Smith Broadcasting (the cable system was later sold to Adelphia and is now part of Charter Communications). In 2004, Boston Ventures, acquired the Smith Broadcasting stations, and formed Smith Media, LLC, after founder Bob Smith died in 2003.

WKTV has been broadcasting its digital signal on UHF channel 29 since May 2006 and in high definition starting with the 2008 Summer Olympics. The station signed off its analog signal on February 18, 2009, and began broadcasting exclusively in digital. This left some viewers without a reachable signal and others looking for an outdoor UHF antenna. To continue serving those areas, WKTV began simulcasting its weekday newscasts at noon and 5 p.m. on WUTQ (1550 AM, now WUSP) and WADR (1480 AM, now WRCK). In May 2011, the radio stations began simulcasting the second hour of WKTV's weekday morning show. On March 16, 2012, WUTQ-FM (100.7 FM), then simulcasting WUTQ/WRCK, began simulcasting the newscasts. WUTQ/WRCK broke from the simulcast later that year when WUTQ-FM owner Ken Roser sold the stations to Good Guys Broadcasting Corporation. WUTQ-FM continues to simulcast WKTV's 5 p.m. newscast and its weekday morning show; however, it now simulcasts the first hour due to an expansion of its popular morning talk show Talk Of The Town.

Due to an ongoing retransmission dispute, Time Warner Cable replaced WKTV with fellow NBC affiliate WBRE-TV from Wilkes-Barre, Pennsylvania, on December 16, 2010. WKTV-DT2 was also dropped and eventually replaced by HBO Family. On the same date, rival WUTR began to be seen in the Burlington, Vermont–Plattsburgh, New York, market on Time Warner Cable after sister station WVNY was dropped for the same reason. Nexstar Broadcasting Group, owner of WBRE, and Mission Broadcasting (a broadcaster whose stations are operated by Nexstar), owner of WUTR, opposed the use of their stations as replacement programming and requested the Time Warner Cable franchise for the affected regions be revoked. WKTV and Time Warner reached an agreement, the terms of which both sides refused to reveal, on January 8, 2011, allowing WKTV and the CW subchannel to return to the cable system the next day. (Ironically, WVNY would later be sold to Mission Broadcasting, making it a sister station to WUTR.)

On October 1, 2013, Smith Media reached a deal to sell WKTV to Heartland Media, a newly-formed company owned by former Gray Television executive Bob Prather. The sale was completed on March 20, 2014. WKTV launched a third digital subchannel eight months later on November 10, carrying programming from MeTV.

== Subchannel history ==
=== WKTV-DT2 ===
WKTV-DT2 is the CBS-affiliated second digital subchannel of WKTV, broadcasting in 720p high definition on channel 2.2.

WKTV-DT2 signed on in September 1998 alongside the creation of The WB 100+. WKTV partnered with the group to launch a cable-only WB affiliate. This new service replaced superstation WPIX from New York City on Harron Cable (then Adelphia, later Time Warner, now Spectrum) systems in the Mohawk Valley (which had been carried dating back to its days as an independent station) and it used the "WBU" (standing for "The WB Utica") call sign in a fictional manner.

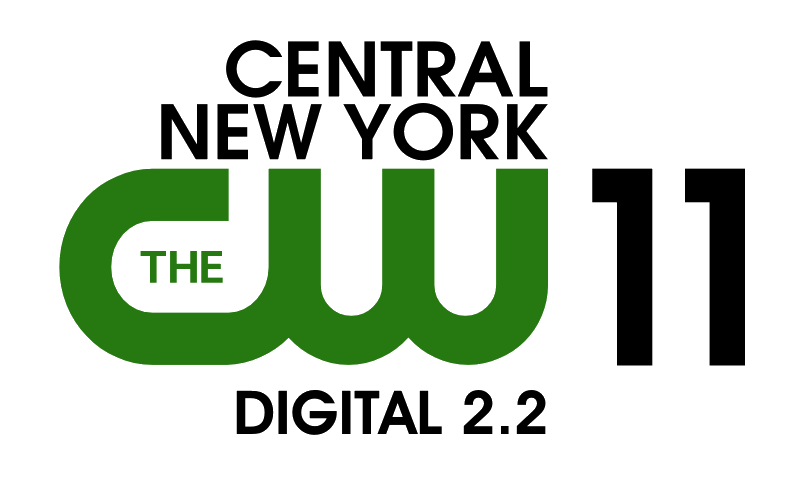
"Central New York's CW 11" logo used from September 18, 2006, until November 22, 2015, when the CW+ affiliate moved to WKTV-DT3 from WKTV-DT2.

In January 2006, The WB and UPN announced that they would merge and form The CW Television Network, from which affiliates were to be drawn from existing WB and UPN affiliates. "WBU" was chosen to become the CW affiliate for Utica, while UPN affiliate WPNY-LP associated itself with MyNetworkTV (a network started by Fox, whose Utica affiliate WFXV was a sister station to WPNY-LP) for UPN or WB affiliates not chosen by The CW. Responding to the selection, WKTV launched a new second digital subchannel to simulcast "WBU" and offer off-air access to CW programming, which begun along with the CW on September 18. The station then began using the WKTV-DT2 calls in an official manner. Originally, this subchannel was known on-air as "Central New York's CW" but was eventually re-branded to "Central New York's CW 11" (and more recently "The CW 11") to reflect its location on Time Warner Cable systems. Ultimately, the new subchannel replaced "WBU" altogether.

On October 26, 2015, WKTV announced that it would change WKTV-DT2's affiliation from The CW to CBS on November 22 (rebranding the subchannel as "CBS Utica"). The new affiliation gave the Utica market its first CBS affiliate since the end of WKTV's secondary affiliation with the network in the mid-1950s, and CBS its first full-time affiliate in Utica. (Prior to this, WTVH in Syracuse and WBNG in Binghamton served as the default CBS affiliates via cable for the Utica market; WTVH was able to be picked up over-the-air in portions of the Utica market before it shut down its analog signal.) Within a month of the subchannel's launch, WKTV-DT2 had replaced WTVH on Time Warner Cable channel 5 in Utica proper, while DirecTV later added WKTV-DT2 to its local packages, as did Dish Network shortly after the new year. On July 1, 2016, WKTV-DT2 was re-launched in the rest of the Utica DMA when the station replaced WTVH in Herkimer County and WBNG in Otsego County. However, as a result of viewer complaints in Otsego County, WBNG was restored to Time Warner Cable systems in that area (alongside WKTV-DT2) on January 25, 2017.

In May 2016, WKTV-DT2 upgraded their over-the-air digital signal into 720p high definition; thus offering a locally operated in-market over-the-air HD feed for CBS for the first time in the Utica–Rome market.

=== WKTV-DT3 ===
WKTV-DT3 is the third digital subchannel of WKTV, broadcasting in 720p high definition on channel 2.3. The subchannel is branded as "WKTV Plus".

The station signed on November 10, 2014, as an affiliate of MeTV. As recommended by Weigel Broadcasting, MeTV's owners, WKTV-DT3 cleared the entire MeTV schedule. After much deliberation between WKTV and Time Warner Cable, WKTV-DT3 was added to Time Warner Cable's Utica line-up in the summer of 2015 on channel 1245.

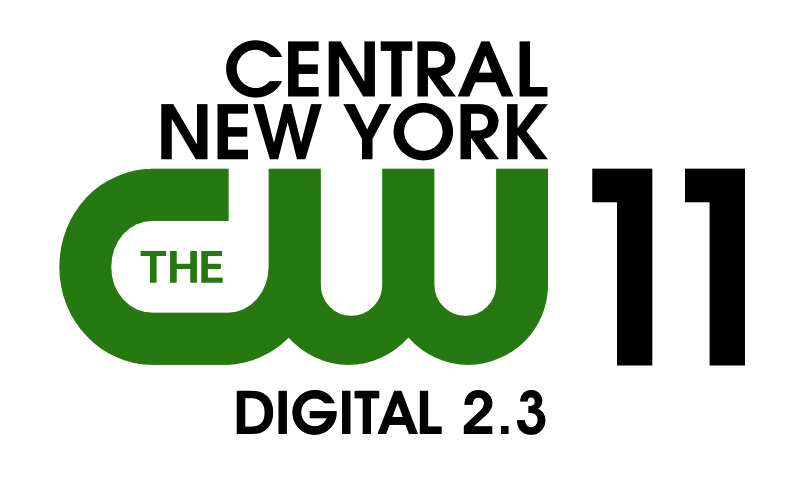
"Central New York's CW 11" logo used from November 22, 2015, to September 1, 2024, when the CW+ affiliation moved to WFXV-DT2.

On October 26, 2015, concurrent with WKTV's announcement that WKTV-DT2 would be joining CBS, it was also announced that WKTV-DT3 would switch its affiliation from MeTV to The CW (WKTV-DT2's former affiliation), while MeTV programs would be moved to a newly created fourth subchannel. Like WKTV-DT2's switch to CBS, both changes also took effect on November 22. WKTV-DT3 subsequently inherited WKTV-DT2's cable channel position, as well as its programming from The CW Plus, while the new fourth subchannel immediately took over WKTV-DT3's former cable channel position.

In May 2016, WKTV-DT3 upgraded its over-the-air digital signal into 720p high definition; thus offering over-the-air access to The CW's HD feed for the first time in the Utica–Rome market.

On September 1, 2024, The CW moved to WFXV-DT2 due to Nexstar Media Group's majority ownership of the network. On that day, WKTV announced that WKTV-DT3 would become a news-oriented independent station, replaying recent WKTV newscasts and airing weather presentations and exclusive newscasts.

== News operation ==
The station has been a ratings stronghold in the Mohawk Valley for its entire history. For the most part, this is because the station had no local competition before WUTR's 1970 sign on; in addition, WUTR aired no local newscasts from August 2003 through September 2011, again leaving WKTV as the lone news operation in the market.

In September 2001, WKTV entered into a news share agreement with Fox affiliate WFXV (then owned by Quorum Broadcasting), leading to a 10 p.m. newscast on that station. Known as NewsChannel 2 on Fox, the show aired every night for a half-hour and was virtually identical to WKTV's regular newscasts. The broadcast generally originated live from WKTV's studios; however, there were frequently technical problems beaming the show to WFXV's facility on Greenfield Road in Rome through microwave relay. Sometimes, WKTV personnel had to record the newscast in advance and physically deliver the videotape to WFXV; the stations' studios are next to each other on top of Smith Hill in Deerfield, New York.

When the outsourcing contract ended on August 31, 2004, WFXV decided not to renew it (by this point, WFXV was owned by Nexstar Broadcasting Group and operated Mission Broadcasting's WUTR through a joint sales agreement). The next day, the 10 p.m. newscast moved to cable-exclusive "WBU", with the weekend edition dropped; the newscast continued on the station, which became WKTV-DT2 in 2006, until WKTV-DT2 switched affiliations to CBS on November 22, 2015. At that point, the newscast moved to WKTV-DT3, where it continues to air to this day.

Newscasts on WKTV officially upgraded to true high definition on January 29, 2015, making WKTV the third station in the Utica area (behind WUTR and WFXV) to switch. Its HD conversion was a two-step process, beginning with the construction of a new set, which debuted on August 4, 2014, and continuing with the replacement of its news and engineering equipment with HD-ready versions.

During weather forecast segments, WKTV features live NOAA National Weather Service Doppler weather radar data from several regional sites. On-air, this system is known as "StormTracker 2 Live Doppler".

=== WKTV-DT2 ===
WKTV-DT2 currently simulcasts the 6 a.m. half-hour of its parent station's morning newscast, the first half-hour of its noon newscast, and its 11 p.m. newscast; the second half-hour of the noon newscast only airs on WKTV to allow WKTV-DT2 to air The Young and the Restless in CBS's recommended 12:30 p.m. time slot. Although plans for WKTV to produce exclusive newscasts for the subchannel using CBS resources have yet to be realized, WKTV also produces periodic specials that air on the subchannel.

=== WKTV-DT3 ===
When WKTV-DT3 first signed on, it did not air any newscasts in favor of MeTV programming. However, on November 23, 2015, WKTV-DT3 began airing the 10 p.m. newscast that had previously aired on WKTV-DT2 as a CW affiliate. The newscast airs every weekday for a half-hour and is virtually identical to WKTV's regular newscasts. On January 25, 2016, WKTV-DT3 also added a 7 a.m. newscast, making it the first station in the Utica market to carry local news at that time. The newscast was dropped on September 1, 2024, after The CW left WKTV-DT3 for WFXV-DT2.

On September 1, 2024, WKTV-DT3 also began airing rebroadcasts of other WKTV newscasts and debuted a half-hour weather forecast under the branding of "KTV Plus Window on the Weather", which is repeated several times daily. The half-hour weeknight 10 p.m. newscast continued under the new format.

==== Notable former staff ====
- Dick Clark – anchor (1951–1952)
- Robert Earle – announcer/anchor (1949–1951)
- Donna Hanover
- Ryan Nobles – sports reporter (late 1990s)

== Controversy ==
On September 28, 2016, WKTV was subjected to two broadcast signal intrusions at 6:17 p.m. and 10:38 p.m. respectively. At the time, FEMA was conducting tests for the Emergency Alert System's test and development message aggregators, using lines from Dr. Seuss's children's books as place holder messages. WKTV's EAS device was mistakenly viewing the testing environment and produced a warning for hazardous substances with the place holder message of "Would you. Could you. On a train?", a quote from Green Eggs and Ham. WKTV issued a retraction and apology over its Twitter feed and website later that night, initially saying it was a mistake on FEMA's behalf before retracting and stating FEMA was uncertain of cause at the time. Coincidentally, a train crash occurred the following morning in Hoboken, New Jersey, killing one and injuring 114. In questioning by Snopes, FEMA ultimately claimed responsibility for the intrusions and that they had no prior knowledge of the disaster.

== Technical information ==
=== Subchannels ===
The station's signal is multiplexed:

Subchannels of WKTV
Channel	Res.	Short name	Programming
2.1	720p	WKTVNBC	NBC
2.2	720p	WKTVCBS	CBS
2.3	720p	KTVPlus	WKTV Plus
2.4	480i	WKTV-ME	MeTV

== See also ==
- Channel 2 virtual TV stations in the United States
- Channel 29 digital TV stations in the United States
