= WUTR =

Television station in Utica, New York

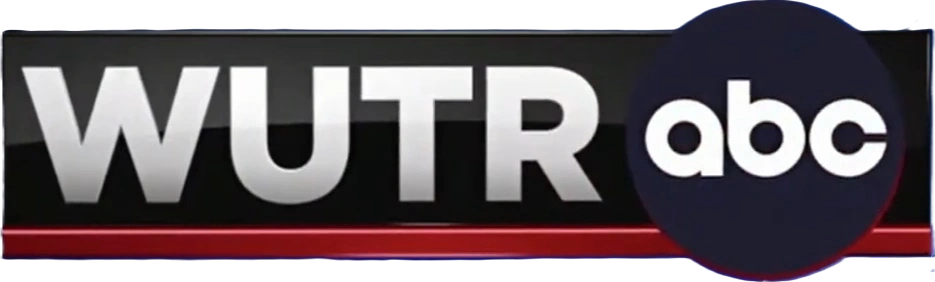

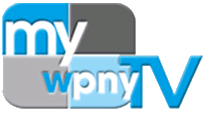
- Utica–Rome, New York; United States
- City: Utica, New York
- Channels: Digital: 30 (UHF); Virtual: 20
- Branding: WUTR ABC; Eyewitness News; MyWPNYTV (20.2)

Programming
- Affiliations: 20.1: ABC; 20.2: Independent with MyNetworkTV; for others, see § Subchannels

Ownership
- Owner: Mission Broadcasting, Inc.
- Operator: Nexstar Media Group
- Sister stations: WFXV, WPNY-LD

History
- First air date: February 28, 1970
- Former channel number: Analog: 20 (UHF, 1970–2009)
- Call sign meaning: Utica/Rome

Technical information
- Licensing authority: FCC
- Facility ID: 57837
- ERP: 50 kW
- HAAT: 227 m (745 ft)
- Transmitter coordinates: 43°8′43″N 75°10′34″W

Links
- Public license information: Public file; LMS
- Website: www.cnyhomepage.com

WUTR (channel 20) is a television station in Utica, New York, United States, serving as the ABC affiliate for the Mohawk Valley. It is owned by Mission Broadcasting and operated by Nexstar Media Group under joint sales and shared services agreements (JSA/SSA), making it sister to WFXV (channel 33), an affiliate of Fox and The CW Plus, and WPNY-LD (channel 11), an independent station with MyNetworkTV. The three stations share studios on Smith Hill Road in Deerfield (with a Utica mailing address), where WUTR's transmitter is also located.

== History ==
WUTR signed on for the first time on February 28, 1970, as the second television station in the market, owned by Roy H. Park Communications. Park originally sought an affiliation with CBS, but the network turned the offer down due to objections from WHEN-TV (channel 5, now WTVH) in Syracuse. WHEN-TV claimed it would have faced substantial revenue losses had WUTR aligned with CBS; WHEN-TV had long claimed Utica–Rome as part of its market coverage area. However, a rivalry between the Syracuse-based Park and then-WHEN owner Meredith Corporation may also have been a factor. As a result, WUTR joined ABC (taking that affiliation from NBC affiliate WKTV, channel 2) and was the only affiliate with the network owned by Park at that time. WUTR was also the only Park TV station located outside Park's native Southern U.S. (although Park maintained his operations in Ithaca, New York, in the state's Southern Tier region).

Until the 1980s, WUTR was the default ABC affiliate for much of the Watertown market. It operated translators in Watertown and in Massena. The translators were shut down after WFYF (now WWTI, which later spent several years as a sister station to WUTR) began operations in 1988 on the Watertown translator allotment.

After Roy Park died in 1993, the future of the group was put into doubt as his estate sold much of the group to corporate investor Gary Knapp. Knapp sold the remnants of the Park group to Media General in 1996. With WUTR being one of the smallest of Park's stations and the sole station the group had in the Northeast, Media General spun it off in mid-1997 to the Ackerley Group (then-owner of ABC affiliate WIXT, now WSYR-TV, in Syracuse). With the purchase, Ackerley began to build a regional strategy called the "Central New York Station Group" (CNYSG) which eventually covered most of Upstate New York.

In October 2001, Clear Channel Communications (now iHeartMedia) announced its buyout of Ackerley closing on its purchase in 2002. Though initially no changes took place, market concentration concerns with Clear Channel's radio cluster in the Utica market put WUTR's future under the company in doubt. Given the option between potentially selling WUTR or the four-station "Sports Stars" sports radio simulcast, Clear Channel reduced budgets and redistributed resources to other stations in the CNYSG. In December 2003, Clear Channel announced it would sell WUTR to Nexstar Broadcasting Group subsidiary Mission Broadcasting; the sale was completed on April 1, 2004. At that time, Nexstar (owner of WFXV and WPNY) took over operations of WUTR under local marketing and joint sales agreements, and the three stations were eventually consolidated into WUTR's studios in Deerfield. The station's broadcasts became digital-only, effective March 16, 2009.

For a time in December 2010, WUTR was available in the Burlington, Vermont–Plattsburgh, New York area on Time Warner Cable systems. Due to an ongoing retransmission dispute, the provider dropped that market's ABC affiliate WVNY and added WUTR in its place. Rival WKTV, which at the time was co-owned with WVNY, was replaced with Nexstar-owned WBRE-TV from Wilkes-Barre, Pennsylvania on Time Warner Cable's systems in Utica for the same reason. Eventually, the dispute was resolved and both stations were returned to the cable system. (In November 2012, Mission would acquire WVNY from Smith, placing that station in the same family as WUTR.)

On June 15, 2016, Nexstar announced that it has entered into an affiliation agreement with Katz Broadcasting for the Escape, Laff, Grit, and Bounce TV networks (the last one of which is owned by Bounce Media LLC, whose COO Jonathan Katz is president/CEO of Katz Broadcasting), bringing the four networks to 81 stations owned and/or operated by Nexstar, including WUTR and WFXV.

== News operation ==
At various times in its history, WUTR has sought to compete with WKTV for local news viewers, with varying degrees of success. Its highest ratings to date, perhaps, occurred during two periods: the late 1980s and the mid-1990s.

After Clear Channel reduced funding for local news gathering, WUTR became more reliant on content originating from its sister stations in Upstate New York (particularly flagship WIXT (now WSYR-TV) in Syracuse), ending weekday morning and weekend newscasts in June 2002. Weeknight newscasts were discontinued and remaining news staff members were terminated in August 2003. For the rest of Clear Channel's ownership, the station simulcast news programs from WIXT, which provided some limited coverage of the Utica and Rome area. After Nexstar/Mission assumed ownership of WUTR, the simulcasts of WIXT's newscasts were replaced with syndicated programming.

After WUTR's sale to Mission Broadcasting, insiders speculated that Nexstar would establish a combined news department for WUTR and its sister stations, WFXV and WPNY. In March 2011, the company announced it would launch a news operation for the three stations by mid-September, and said it would invest $1 million for staff and equipment. WUTR's Eyewitness News operation began on September 12, 2011, and broadcast in true high definition, making it the first station in the Utica–Rome market to air full high-definition news broadcasts. (WFXV would become the second such station four hours later, when its 10 p.m. newscast launched.) Late-evening newscasts are broadcast at 10 p.m. on WFXV and at 11 p.m. on WUTR. As of July 6, 2015, the audio of WUTR's 6 p.m. newscast also simulcasts on Townsquare Media-owned radio station WIBX. On April 3, 2023, WUTR added a simulcast of the 5 and 6 a.m. hours of WSYR-TV's morning newscast; WSYR-TV had been reunited with WUTR in 2012 when Nexstar purchased the station from Newport Television.

WUTR has announced no plans for noon, afternoon (4, 5 or 5:30 p.m.), or weekend newscasts. As a result, the station offers the fewest weekly hours of local news of any ABC affiliate in the state of New York.

=== Notable former on-air staff ===
- Jim Axelrod – anchor/reporter (1989–1990; now with CBS News)
- Jeff Rossen – reporter (was with NBC News)
- Bob Van Dillen – meteorologist (now with Fox Weather)

== Subchannels ==
The station's signal is multiplexed:

Subchannels of WUTR
| Channel | Res. | Short name | Programming |
|---|---|---|---|
| 20.1 | 720p | WUTR-TV | ABC |
| 20.2 | 720p | WPNY-LP | WPNY-LD (Independent with MyNetworkTV) |
| 20.3 | 480i | Grit | Grit |
| 20.4 | 480i | Bounce | Bounce TV |

Simulcast of subchannels of another station
