= WBGK =

Radio station in Newport Village, New York

WBGK and WBUG-FM

WBGK: Newport Village, New York; WBUG-FM: Fort Plain, New York; United States
- Broadcast area: Utica–Rome; Mohawk Valley
- Frequencies: WBGK: 99.7 MHz; WBUG-FM: 101.1 MHz
- Branding: Bug Country

Programming
- Format: Country music
- Affiliations: Premiere Networks; Westwood One

Ownership
- Owner: Ken Roser; (Roser Communications Network, LLC)
- Sister stations: WUTQ-FM; WSKU; WSKS

History
- First air date: WBGK: October 2000; WBUG-FM: March 1, 1991
- Former call signs: WBUG-FM: WLKO (1989–1992)
- Call sign meaning: "Bug Country"

Technical information
- Licensing authority: FCC
- Facility ID: WBGK: 110; WBUG-FM: 72625
- Class: WBGK: A; WBUG-FM: A
- ERP: WBGK: 1,400 watts; WBUG-FM: 1,250 watts
- HAAT: WBGK: 206 meters (676 ft); WBUG-FM: 219 meters (719 ft)
- Transmitter coordinates: WBGK: 43°8′28.2″N 75°1′47.5″W; WBUG-FM: 42°52′44.2″N 74°47′5.5″W

Links
- Public license information: WBGK: Public file; LMS; WBUG-FM: Public file; LMS
- Webcast: Listen live
- Website: www.bugcountry.com

WBGK (99.7 MHz) and WBUG-FM (101.1 MHz) are commercial radio stations simulcasting a country music radio format known as "Bug Country". WBGK is licensed to Newport, and WBUG-FM is licensed to Fort Plain, New York. They are owned by Roser Communications Network, Inc. The signals of the two stations cover the Utica-Rome radio market as well as the Mohawk Valley.

== History ==
WBUG-FM began on March 1, 1991, as WLKO, a locally produced simulcast with WBUG (1570 AM) in Amsterdam. It became WBUG-FM on May 15, 1992. WBUG's programming was also heard on WBGG (900 AM) in Saratoga Springs, which carried a country format from August 1992 until becoming classic rock station WCKM in April 1994. It was replaced with WLFH (1230 AM) in Little Falls, which had itself been a country music station.

The stations then broadcast the Real Country satellite classic country format from ABC Radio, and added WBGK at 99.7 FM in October 2000. WLFH was later acquired by Clear Channel Communications and left Bug Country to join the "Sports Stars" network of WADR/WUTQ and WRNY. In 2004, WBUG left Bug Country to become talk-formatted WVTL, leaving WBGK and WBUG-FM as the only two stations in the Bug Country network. In November 2009, WBGK and WBUG-FM dropped Real Country and swapped it with a continuous automated selection of country Christmas music. After the holidays, their current format of mainstream country was launched and the station returned to local production. WBGK had been providing live play-by-play high school football games but that ended in 2011.

On March 30, 2015, Roser Communications moved the studios of all their stations, including WBGK/WBUG-FM, to new facilities located at the Canal Park off Leland Avenue. Prior to this, Roser Communications had been leasing space at the Adirondack Bank building on Genesee Street.
