= WUTQ-FM =

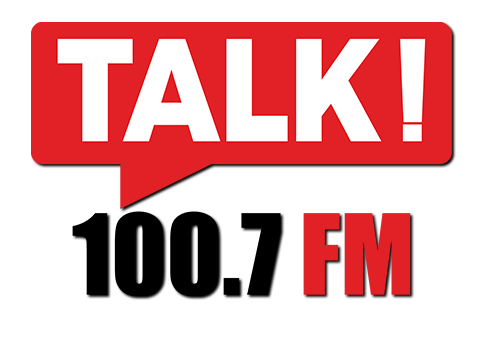
- Utica, New York; United States
- Broadcast area: Utica-Rome
- Frequency: 100.7 MHz
- Branding: Talk! 100.7

Programming
- Format: Talk radio
- Network: Townhall News
- Affiliations: Fox Sports Radio; Premiere Networks; Westwood One; WKTV

Ownership
- Owner: Roser Communications Network, Inc.
- Sister stations: WBGK; WBUG-FM; WSKS; WSKU

History
- First air date: July 11, 1994 (as WVVC)
- Former call signs: WEIF (construction permit) (1989–1994); WVVC (1994–2001); WKVU (2001–2010); WRCK (2010–2012)
- Call sign meaning: approximation of Utica

Technical information
- Licensing authority: FCC
- Facility ID: 14532
- Class: A
- ERP: 1,600 watts
- HAAT: 191 meters (627 ft)
- Transmitter coordinates: 43°2′15″N 75°11′45″W

Links
- Public license information: Public file; LMS
- Webcast: Listen live
- Website: www.wutqfm.com

WUTQ-FM (100.7 MHz) is a commercial radio station licensed to Utica, New York. The station serves the Utica-Rome region of New York State. It is owned by Roser Communications Network and it airs a talk radio format.

The studios and offices are on Leland Avenue in Utica. The transmitter is on Higby Road in New Hartford.

== Programming ==
Weekdays begin with a local interview and information show, The Talk of the Town, hosted by Jason Aiello, Rocco LaDuca and Mark Wolber. The rest of the schedule is made up of nationally syndicated talk shows, The Glenn Beck Radio Program, The Chris Plante Show, The Clay Travis and Buck Sexton Show, The Jesse Kelly Show, The Larry Elder Show and Red Eye Radio.

Weekends feature shows on money, health, real estate, technology and home repair. Weekend syndicated programs include At Home with Gary Sullivan, Jill Schlesinger on Money, Rich DeMuro on Tech, The Ben Ferguson Show and Sunday Nights with Bill Cunningham. WUTQ-FM simulcasts newscasts from television station WKTV. Most hours begin with an update from Townhall News.

== History ==
The station got its construction permit from the Federal Communications Commission in 1989, and was assigned the call sign WEIF. It took several years for original owner Clara Crocco of Clayville, New York, to put the station on the air. The station officially signed on the air on July 11, 1994, as WVVC. It was a Christian radio station, owned by Bethany Broadcasting, with its studios and offices on Higby Road in New Hartford, New York. (The transmitter remains at that location, even after several ownership changes.)

WVVC was sold to the Educational Media Foundation (EMF) in 2001 for $1.25 million; this was the first purchase made by EMF in the state of New York. It became Utica's K-Love station, under the call sign WKVU.

On December 15, 2010, Air 1 station WRCK swapped frequencies with WKVU, with WRCK moving to 100.7 FM and WKVU moving to 107.3 FM. In November 2011, EMF announced that it would sell WRCK to Roser Communications and move Air 1 to WOKR (93.5 FM), which had previously carried the now-defunct God's Country Radio Network.

On March 16, 2012, Roser took control of the station and began a simulcast of AM stations WUTQ and WADR, the full-service gold-based adult contemporary stations that had been airing on the station since approximately 2007. WUTQ had previously been relying on an FM translator, W238CA (95.5) in Middleville, New York, for FM coverage. On March 23, the station took the WUTQ-FM call letters, with the WRCK call sign moving to the former WADR.

WUTQ spun off its former AM simulcast stations to Good Guys Broadcasting in July 2012; the stations were shut down in late 2015.

On March 30, 2015, Roser Communications moved the studios of all their stations, including WUTQ-FM, to new facilities located at the Canal Park off Leland Avenue. Prior to this, Roser Communications had been leasing space at the Adirondack Bank building on Genesee Street.

Dave Coombs, former morning host at classic rock WTKW and WOUR, was hired as morning host in August 2015.

On February 27, 2017, after a weekend of stunting with a wide variety of sound clips and snippets of music, WUTQ dropped its soft AC music and became a full-time talk radio station as "Talk! 100.7", becoming the first station in the Utica-Rome area to broadcast FM news-talk. The Talk of the Town, the station's existing morning drive talk show, was retained, with new hosts after Coombs left for another station; also retained were simulcasts of three WKTV television newscasts. Music programming was replaced by syndicated talk shows, including Glenn Beck, Laura Ingraham, Dave Ramsey, America Now with Buck Sexton, Michael Savage, and Red Eye Radio.
