= Lee Hamilton (sports) =

American sportscaster

Lee "Hacksaw" Hamilton is an American sportscaster and radio talk show host based in San Diego, California. He was co-host of the Hacksaw and Hayworth show on from 6:00 am to 9:00 am Pacific Time Monday through Friday on XEPRS-AM, known on-air as "San Diego's Sports Leader, The Mighty 1090" and he worked alongside producers Bobby Wooldridge and Alex Padilla. Hacksaw is also a regular contributor to SanDiego.com.

Born as Paul K. Mahon, he grew up in Northport, New York, on Long Island. Hamilton is also a host on Sirius XM Satellite Radio's MLB Network Radio channel. He began calling play-by-play for the NFL on Compass Media Networks in 2009.

Hamilton had been the afternoon drive-time host on KLSD, "XTRA Sports 1360" in San Diego, from its launch in November 2007 until September 3, 2008, when his contract with parent company Clear Channel Communications expired and Clear Channel wanted better ratings so they let him go. The expiration also ended a job he had at KLAC in Los Angeles.

Prior to 2007, he worked 17 years at XETRA-AM "XTRA Sports 690", a station that was operated by the current American operator of XEPRS, John Lynch.

In July 2014, Hamilton left XEPRS-AM but continues daily sports commentary and connects with fans on his website "Lee Hacksaw Hamilton.com".

== Years in Southern California ==
From 1987 to 2005, he hosted a daily four-hour talk show on those stations. In July 2005, he lost the show as part of a restructuring as KLAC de-emphasized sports talk in favor of "man talk." He was replaced by Matt "Money" Smith and Joe Grande, both of whom once read sports news as part as morning shows on music stations (respectively, KROQ-FM and KPWR), as well as former UCLA Bruins quarterback Wayne Cook. Hamilton still had a daily segment at the start of the show until 2006.

== Before Southern California ==
In the mid-1970s, Hamilton was the play-by-play voice of the Mohawk Valley Comets - Utica, New York, of the North American Hockey League. He then called the play-by-play for the Cleveland Crusaders of the World Hockey Association on WWWE "3WE" 1100. After the Crusaders moved to Minnesota, Lee hosted an evening sports talk radio show, the "Sports Desk" on Akron, Ohio radio station WHLO. He hosted the long-running sports radio program Sportswatch on WIBX in Utica.

From 1981 to 1987, Hamilton was announcer for the football and basketball programs at Arizona State University and a talk-show host in Phoenix for news/talk/sports station KTAR. His show, 620 Sportsline, was a four-hour show similar in format to the show he would host in Southern California. He started at "XTRA" doing play-by-play for the NFL's San Diego Chargers while still at KTAR, before Phoenix was chosen for an NFL franchise.

== Play-by-play work ==
Hamilton has also been a noted play-by-play host for the San Diego Chargers, Seattle Seahawks, USC Trojans, Minnesota Vikings, and San Diego State Aztecs.

Hamilton was the radio play-by-play announcer for the Chargers from 1986 to 1997. Hamilton replaced Ted Leitner, who later replaced Hamilton in 1997 when XTRA Sports lost the broadcasting rights to KFMB. (Hamilton and Leitner became broadcast partners in 2007 as KOGO assumed the broadcast rights to San Diego State Aztecs football games. Hamilton was normally the color commentator, but switched to play-by-play for a few early-season games when Leitner called San Diego Padres games on XEPRS-AM.) Prior to that he called USC Trojans football from 1997 to 2000 alongside Paul McDonald.

Hamilton called the game for Super Bowl XXIX in January 1995 where the Chargers, in their only appearance, were defeated by the San Francisco 49ers. His partners were Jim Laslavic and Pat Curran. Broadcasting team partner Chet Forte became ill and was unable to continue during the Chargers' run to the Super Bowl.

Hamilton's last play-by-play work was for the Minnesota Vikings in 2001, but his tenure was cut short due to his past comments on his talk radio show that were accused of being racist. He was criticized for racially slurring pitcher Hideki Irabu from Japan. Hamilton defended himself by saying: "I'm terribly bothered by the way I've been portrayed...I'm a stand-up guy and I'm an honest-to-goodness good person."

Hamiton also criticized Major League Baseball's decision to include records of Negro League players. He defended his viewpoint by saying "I am a purist I admit." Hamilton gave then went on to say "What's next, recognizing Ichuro[sic] Suzuzki's[sic] lifetime record in Japan's Nippon Leagues with his Mariners marks?"

Other play-by-play assignments include the USC Trojans football team, the Seattle Seahawks (1998–1999), the Pac-10 men's basketball tournament, and National Football League games on Sports USA Radio Network.

== Catchphrases ==
Hamilton is best known for his pet phrases: "Show me your lightning bolt!", and "I am bleeping brilliant!" and, "You use the line or you lose the line," his argumentative attitude toward some callers, and "I've won awards, I have a national reputation, I've built a sportstalk empire". He also uses the phrase "Bring your A Game, don't be lame!" on occasion.
