= WIBX =

- Utica, New York; United States
- Broadcast area: Mohawk Valley
- Frequency: 950 kHz
- Branding: 950 and 92.3 WIBX

Programming
- Format: News/Talk
- Network: Fox News Radio
- Affiliations: Compass Media Networks; Premiere Networks; Westwood One

Ownership
- Owner: Townsquare Media; (Townsquare Media Licensee of Utica/Rome, Inc.)
- Sister stations: WFRG-FM, WLZW, WODZ-FM, WOUR

History
- First air date: December 5, 1925; 100 years ago
- Former frequencies: 1460 kHz (1925–1926); 1280 kHz (1926–1927); 1260 kHz (1927–1928); 1200 kHz (1928–1941); 1230 kHz (1941–1948)

Technical information
- Licensing authority: FCC
- Facility ID: 168
- Class: B
- Power: 5,000 watts
- Transmitter coordinates: 43°6′12.3″N 75°20′29.6″W
- Translator: 92.3 W222DA (Utica)

Links
- Public license information: Public file; LMS
- Webcast: Listen Live
- Website: wibx950.com

WIBX (950 AM) is a commercial radio station in Utica, New York. It is one of Central New York's oldest radio stations, dating back to 1925. The station airs a news/talk radio format and is owned by Townsquare Media as part of a cluster with adult contemporary 98.7 WLZW, country music 104.3 WFRG-FM, classic hits 96.1 WODZ, and classic rock 96.9 WOUR. The studios and offices are on River Road in Marcy, New York.

WIBX broadcasts at 5,000 watts around the clock. It uses a directional antenna system with a four-tower array to avoid interfering with other stations on AM 950. The transmitter site is off Clark Mills Road in Whitesboro, New York. WIBX is also heard on FM translator W222DA at 92.3 FM.

== Programming ==
=== Weekdays and weekends ===
WIBX broadcasts nationally syndicated conservative talk programs from Premiere Networks, Westwood One and Fox News Radio: The Brian Kilmeade Show, Fox Across America with Jimmy Failla, The Sean Hannity Show, The Guy Benson Show, The Michael Berry Show and Coast to Coast AM with George Noory.

On weekends the station features shows about money, health, home repair, the law, and technology. Weekend syndicated programs include The Chris Plante Show, America at Night with Rick Valdés, The Money Pit Home Improvement Radio Show, The Kim Komando Show, The Weekend with Michael Brown, Handel on the Law with Bill Handel, The Townhall Week in Review and Somewhere in Time with Art Bell, as well as repeats of weekday shows. Most hours begin with an update from Fox News Radio.

=== Charitable broadcasts ===
The station conducts a radiothon for the American Heart Association every March. It was first held in 1971 in memory of Ralph Allinger, a WIBX staffer who died of a heart attack. In subsequent years, the American Heart Association has also held additional fundraisers in the Mohawk Valley, including a run and walk, to supplement the radiothon.

== History ==
=== Early years ===
WIBX was first licensed on July 29, 1925, to a local radio dealer, Grid-Leak (Inc.) at 236 Genesee Street in Utica. It began broadcasting on December 5, 1925. Its call letters were randomly assigned from a sequential roster of available call signs. The company put the station on the air to provide programming for customers who bought radios. WIBX's facilities were housed at the store. The following April, Grid Leak transferred the station to a subsidiary, WIBX, Inc., and a month later new studios were opened at the Hotel Utica. Initially operating at 1460 kilocycles, WIBX moved to 1280 kHz in late 1926, and then to 1260 kHz in April 1927. Among Central New York radio stations, only WSYR is older, going on the air in 1922.

The Boston Store acquired the station in early 1928, a move intended to keep WIBX in Utica. That April, the station was taken over by John C. Drummond. The Federal Radio Commission moved WIBX to 1200 kHz on November 11. On December 1, the station moved its studios to the First National Bank Building. The Buffalo Broadcasting Corporation, which operated several stations in Buffalo, New York, including WGR, WKBW, and WMAK, acquired WIBX in August 1929. In March 1931, the station was sold to a partnership of Percy B. Brown and Scott Howe Bowen. Bowen soon acquired Brown's stake; his family would maintain ownership for nearly five decades.

=== CBS affiliation ===
On October 14, 1934, WIBX became a network affiliate of the Columbia Broadcasting System (CBS). Through the Golden Age of Radio, the station carried the CBS network's line up of dramas, comedies, soap operas, game shows, sports and big band remotes, as well as newscasts.

WIBX remained a CBS Radio Network affiliate for 76 years.

=== Power increase ===
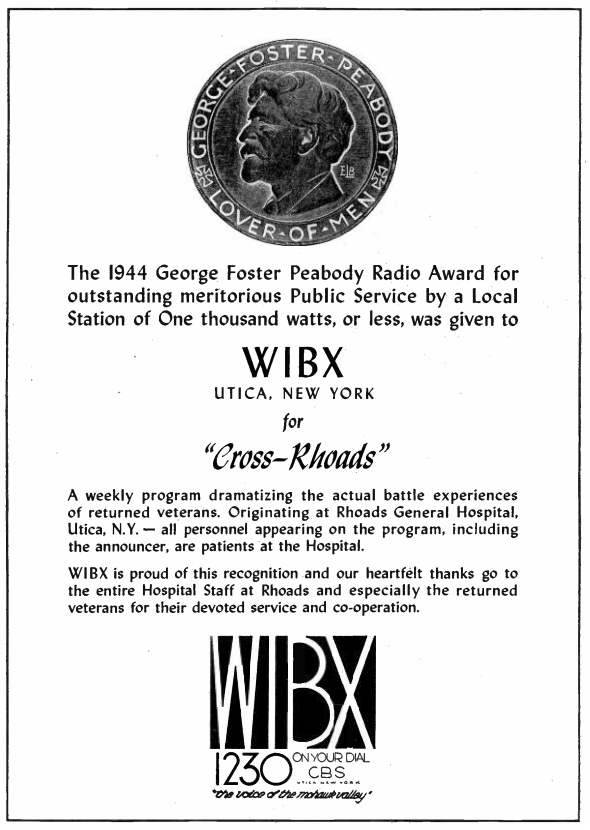
1945 station advertisement.

The North American Regional Broadcasting Agreement (NARBA) moved WIBX to 1230 kHz on March 29, 1941. However, on this frequency, the station remained at low-power, 250 watts, as had been the case at 1200 kHz. That meant it could not be easily heard in nearby Rome at night, leading the Rome Sentinel to apply for a 5,000-watt station serving both cities in 1946. Afraid that the new station, which eventually became WRUN, would prove more attractive for CBS, WIBX sought to upgrade to its own 5,000-watt facility.

On May 2, 1947, the Federal Communications Commission granted WIBX a move to 950 kHz from a transmitter site in Whitesboro, New York, with the new facility going on the air in early 1948. The 1230 frequency was relocated to nearby Little Falls, and would return to the air in 1952 when WLFH (now WIXT) signed-on. The WIBX studios would relocate to Whitesboro as well in the early 1960s. An FM sister station at 98.7, WIBQ (now WLZW), was added January 1, 1974. An earlier WIBX-FM at 96.9 FM first signed on in October 1946, but left the air during the early 1950s, when few people owned FM radios.

=== Sportswatch ===
WIBX included in its line up the sports program Sportswatch, which debuted in the 1950s and included among its numerous hosts Bill O'Donnell, Lee "Hacksaw" Hamilton, Tim Roye, Bob Papa, Jim Jackson, and Mike Haynes. Sportswatch ended its run in January 2013.

=== All-Talk format ===
The Bowen family sold WIBX to Marathon Communications in 1979. Soon afterward, the station's longstanding full service middle of the road format began evolving away from music in favor of increased news, talk, and sports programming. After REBS, Inc. acquired WIBX in 1985, music programming was dropped entirely, outside of the station's Sunday morning Polish language program, Polonaise. Maritime Broadcasting bought the station in 1988. The station was then sold to 950 Communications Corporation in 1992, to Forever Broadcasting in 1996, and to Regent Communications (the predecessor to Townsquare Media) in 1999. Regent moved its Utica-area stations to studios in Marcy, New York, in 2003. WIBX ended its long affiliation with CBS on February 28, 2011, when it joined Fox News Radio.

In 2015, WIBX reached an agreement with Nexstar Broadcasting Group and Mission Broadcasting, whose stations are managed by Nexstar under shared services and local marketing agreements, to share programming, allowing Nexstar-owned Channel 33 WFXV to simulcast WIBX's morning show starring Bill Keeler, while WIBX began simulcasting Mission-owned WUTR Channel 20's 6 p.m. newscast. Citing closed-captioning expenses, WFXV dropped the simulcast of Keeler's show on January 4, 2016, but reinstated it May 9, 2016. Keeler's show was dropped again in 2022 when WFXV began simulcasting Morning in America from corporate sibling NewsNation. On August 20, 2026, Keeler announced that a corporate decision had been made to cancel his show, leaving the station without live, local programming for the first time in his 100-year history.

For listeners who prefer tuning in WIBX on the FM dial, the station added an FM translator in 2022. It had previously broadcast on 106.9 FM. It moved to 92.3 FM on April 15, 2024, due to interference complaints by listeners of 106.9 WSYR-FM in Syracuse.

== Former logos ==
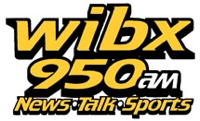
WIBX logo prior to March 8, 2011

WIBX logo prior to November 23, 2021
