= Smith Hill (Oneida County, New York) =

Mountain in New York, United States

- Location within New York Location within the United States

Highest point
- Elevation: 1,204 feet (367 m)
- Coordinates: 43°08′41″N 75°10′35″W

Geography
- Location: NE of Utica, New York, U.S.
- Topo map: USGS South Trenton

Smith Hill is a mountain located in Central New York Region of New York located northeast of Utica, New York. Smith Hill is the location of the WKTV and the WUTR/WFXV/WPNY-LD studio facilities and transmitters, with both studios standing across Grace Road from each other.
