= WFXV =

Television station in Utica, New York

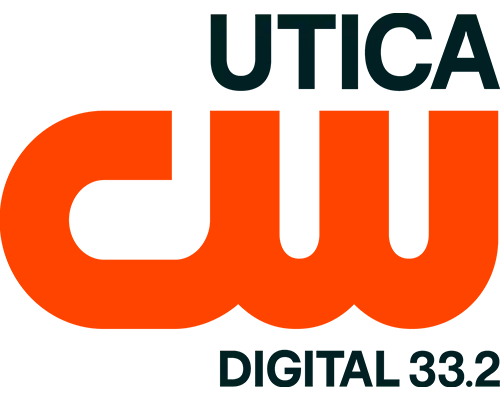
- Utica–Rome, New York; United States
- City: Utica, New York
- Channels: Digital: 34 (UHF); Virtual: 33
- Branding: WFXV 33; Eyewitness News; Utica CW (33.2)

Programming
- Affiliations: 33.1: Fox; 33.2: The CW Plus; for others, see § Subchannels

Ownership
- Owner: Nexstar Media Group; (Nexstar Media Inc.)
- Sister stations: WUTR, WPNY-LD

History
- Founded: April 26, 1982
- First air date: October 12, 1986
- Former call signs: WTUV (1986–1990)
- Former channel numbers: Analog: 33 (UHF, 1986–2009); Digital: 27 (UHF, 2005–2020)
- Call sign meaning: "Fox Utica" (the "V" looks like "U")

Technical information
- Licensing authority: FCC
- Facility ID: 43424
- ERP: 1,000 kW
- HAAT: 243.5 m (799 ft)
- Transmitter coordinates: 43°8′41.1″N 75°10′32.2″W

Links
- Public license information: Public file; LMS
- Website: www.cnyhomepage.com

WFXV (channel 33) is a television station in Utica, New York, United States, serving the Mohawk Valley as an affiliate of Fox and The CW Plus. It is owned by Nexstar Media Group alongside WPNY-LD (channel 11)—an independent station with MyNetworkTV—and co-managed with ABC affiliate WUTR (channel 20). The three stations share studios on Smith Hill Road in Deerfield (with a Utica mailing address), where WFXV's transmitter is also located.

== History ==
A construction permit for a new television station on analog channel 33 in Utica was granted in 1982 and issued the call letters WTUV; construction began in the spring of 1983. The new station attempted to affiliate with CBS, but the network refused, citing that the new station would not attract new viewers, and that the area was sufficiently covered by Syracuse-based WTVH. A petition filed by WTUV's owner, Mohawk Valley Broadcasting, against both the network and WTVH was rejected by the Federal Communications Commission (FCC) in 1984. (Utica would not receive a local CBS affiliate until November 22, 2015, when rival NBC affiliate WKTV, channel 2, affiliated its second digital subchannel with the network.) WTUV finally signed-on October 12, 1986, as an affiliate of the then-new Fox network, and has been with Fox ever since. However, as with other Fox affiliates, WTUV considered itself an independent station until Fox began its prime time schedule in April 1987. The station adopted the current call sign WFXV on February 1, 1990, in reference to the network. The call letters can also be interpreted as "Fox Utica", since the "V" looks like "U". Channel 33's studios were originally located on Greenfield Road in Rome.

At some point in time, translator station W11BS licensed to Little Falls became a sister station to WFXV and began to be housed at the Rome facility. In 1996, WFXV and what had become WUPN-LP were sold to Sullivan Broadcasting, which would itself be bought out by the Sinclair Broadcast Group only two years later. Instead of being acquired by that company, WFXV and the low-power station (by then WPNY-LP) were purchased by Quorum Broadcasting founded by former Sullivan head Dan Sullivan. The station was acquired by current owner Nexstar in 2003.

In December of that year, Mission Broadcasting, a company with connections to Nexstar, announced it would acquire ABC affiliate WUTR from Clear Channel Communications (now iHeartMedia). The deal was closed on April 1, 2004—when local marketing and joint sales agreements were established between the two stations. Although the ABC affiliate was the junior partner, WFXV and WPNY-LP were consolidated into WUTR's studios in Deerfield.

This station aired The Bill Keeler Show (a local late-night comedy series) from April 1, 2003, to 2005 when the program moved to WKTV. Prior to the DTV transition, WFXV filed an application with the FCC to relocate its transmitter southwest of Utica to a tower on Skyline Drive in Clinton, a village of Kirkland. However, this proposal was ultimately denied by the FCC. WFXV's broadcast became digital-only, effective March 16, 2009.

On June 15, 2016, Nexstar announced that it has entered into an affiliation agreement with Katz Broadcasting for the Escape, Laff, Grit, and Bounce TV networks (the last one of which is owned by Bounce Media LLC, whose COO Jonathan Katz is president/CEO of Katz Broadcasting), bringing the four networks to 81 stations owned and/or operated by Nexstar, including WFXV and sister station WUTR.

On April 1, 2020, the antenna changed to reflect the switch over from UHF channel 27 to 34 on March 13, 2020, at noon.

On August 22, 2024, Nexstar announced that WFXV-DT2 would join The CW Plus on September 1, taking the market's CW affiliation from longtime affiliate WKTV-DT3.

== News operation ==
In September 2001, WFXV entered into a news share agreement with WKTV (then owned by Smith Television). This arrangement resulted in a prime time newscast at 10 to debut on this station. Known as NewsChannel 2 on Fox, the show aired every night for a half-hour and mirrored programs seen on WKTV. The broadcast was supposed to originate live from WKTV's Smith Hill Road studios in Deerfield but there were technical problems beaming the show to WFXV's facility in Rome through microwave relay.

Sometimes, personnel had to record the newscast in advance and physically deliver the videotape to this station which was a thirty-minute drive. When the outsourcing contract ended on August 31, 2004, WFXV decided not to renew it. The prime time broadcast moved to WKTV's cable-only WB affiliate "WBU" (now CBS affiliate WKTV-DT2) the next day and reduced to weeknights. Today the newscast airs on WKTV Plus as NewsChannel 2 at 10 and can be seen for thirty minutes.

After WUTR's acquisition by Mission Broadcasting, speculation began circulating Nexstar would establish a combined news department for WFXV as well as sister stations WUTR and WPNY to take on longtime dominant WKTV. Actual progress was not made until March 31, 2011, when the company announced it would launch a news operation for the three outlets by mid-September. Nexstar invested $1 million for new equipment and the hiring of twelve employees. The company's initial press release indicated this station would feature separate news anchors from WUTR and be presented in a more fast-paced format to attract Fox's younger viewers.

In a later press release in August, however, indications mentioned only one anchor team was hired for both stations. The debut of WFXV 33 Eyewitness News at 10 occurred September 12, 2011, making WFXV the second station in the Utica area (behind WUTR, which launched its newscast four hours earlier) to broadcast local news in true high definition. WKTV would not switch to true high-definition until January 29, 2015. The newscast competes against a similar broadcast airing on WKTV's third digital subchannel. Throughout the process of building a local news operation from scratch, WFXV consulted with viewers and businesses for input in developing the final product. Right now, there is no sports department at the operation's inception.

WFXV added a simulcast of Bill Keeler's radio show, which originates from radio station WIBX, in 2015. The simulcast was temporarily dropped due to new 2016 requirements from the FCC requiring local real-time closed captioning on January 4, 2016; it returned on May 9, 2016, with captioning. Keeler's show was finally dropped from WFXV in 2022 when it began simulcasting Morning in America from corporate sibling NewsNation.

== Technical information ==
=== Subchannels ===
The station's signal is multiplexed:

Subchannels of WFXV
Channel	Res.	Short name	Programming
33.1	720p	WFXV-TV	Fox
33.2	720p	CW	The CW Plus
33.3	480i	Mystery	Ion Mystery
33.4	480i	Laff	Laff

=== Former translator ===
WFXV was previously relayed on analog repeater W31BP (channel 31) in the Town of Burlington from a transmitter on Clock Hill Road. W31BP's license was surrendered to the FCC and canceled on August 3, 2021.
