= WODZ-FM =

- Rome, New York; United States
- Broadcast area: Utica–Rome, New York
- Frequency: 96.1 MHz
- Branding: 96.1 The Eagle

Programming
- Format: Classic hits
- Affiliations: Compass Media Networks; Premiere Networks; United Stations Radio Networks

Ownership
- Owner: Townsquare Media; (Townsquare Media Licensee of Utica/Rome, Inc.)
- Sister stations: WIBX; WOUR; WLZW; WFRG-FM

History
- First air date: August 1968 (as WKAL-FM at 95.9)
- Former call signs: WKAL-FM (1968–1984); WTCO (1984–1986); WKAL-FM (1986–1988); WFRG-FM (1988–1993)
- Former frequencies: 95.9 MHz (1968–1988)
- Call sign meaning: "Oldies" (previous format)

Technical information
- Licensing authority: FCC
- Facility ID: 72068
- Class: B1
- ERP: 7,400 watts
- HAAT: 184 meters
- Transmitter coordinates: 43°8′39″N 75°10′45″W

Links
- Public license information: Public file; LMS
- Webcast: Listen live
- Website: 961theeagle.com

WODZ-FM (96.1 MHz), branded as "The Eagle", is a radio station broadcasting a classic hits format. Licensed to Rome, New York, United States, the station serves the Utica–Rome market. The station is owned by Townsquare Media as part of a cluster with news-talk station WIBX, classic rock-formatted WOUR, hot AC-formatted WLZW (Lite 98.7), and country-formatted WFRG (Big Frog 104).

== History ==
WODZ-FM signed on in August 1968 as WKAL-FM, owned by Maurer Broadcasting Corporation and operating at 95.9 FM. The station originally simulcast its AM sister station, WKAL (1450 AM). In 1977, WKAL-FM dropped the simulcast in favor of beautiful music.

Maurer Broadcasting Corporation sold WKAL AM-FM to Wooster Republican Publishing Company of Wooster, Ohio, in 1980. In July 1984, WKAL-FM changed its call letters to WTCO, and became a country music station, "Top Country." The following year, the station, along with WKAL, was acquired by Howard Green and Donald Simmons, owner of WENY AM-TV and WLEZ in Elmira and WOND and WMGM FM-TV in Atlantic City, New Jersey. The new owners reverted the station's call letters to WKAL-FM on February 10, 1986, and implemented a soft adult contemporary format.

Target Communications bought WKAL AM-FM from Green and Simmons in 1987; soon after taking over, on February 1, 1988, the call sign was changed to WFRG-FM, and the station returned to country music, this time branded "96 Frog". The new format was simulcast on 1450 AM, which also took the WFRG call letters (save for a short time in the early 1990s when the AM station broke away to become oldies station WZLB); in addition, the station moved to its current frequency, 96.1.

Target Communications eventually became Arrow Communications, which went into receivership in 1992, and then in November 1993, WFRG AM-FM was purchased by Forever Broadcasting, owners of WIBX and dominant market leader WLZW. Forever renamed the stations WODZ and launched an oldies format, with the country format and WFRG-FM call letters moving to 104.3 FM. The simulcast on AM 1450 continued until May 1999, when that frequency was sold to the Bible Broadcasting Network and became WYFY (it has since reclaimed the WKAL call sign). Forever sold its stations in the market, including WODZ-FM, to Regent Communications (the forerunner to Townsquare Media) several months later. On January 2, 2015, WODZ shifted to classic hits and rebranded from "Oldiez 96" to "96.1 The Eagle."
