= WUTI =

- Utica, New York; United States
- Broadcast area: Utica, New York
- Frequency: 1150 kHz

Programming
- Format: Defunct

Ownership
- Owner: Leatherstocking Media Group

History
- First air date: April 24, 1948
- Last air date: May 23, 2013
- Former call signs: WRUN (1948–2009)
- Call sign meaning: UTIca

Technical information
- Facility ID: 73969
- Class: B
- Power: 5,000 watts day 1,000 watts night
- Transmitter coordinates: 43°10′31″N 75°21′3″W

WUTI (1150 AM) was a radio station broadcasting a talk format. Licensed to Utica, New York, United States, the station, established in 1948 as WRUN, was last owned by Leatherstocking Media Group, Inc., and simulcast with WFBL in Syracuse until going off the air in 2013.

== History ==
WUTI signed on April 24, 1948 as WRUN, under the ownership of the Rome Sentinel. The Sentinel was concerned that the Utica-Rome area was not being served adequately by WIBX, which, at the time the paper applied for the construction permit in 1946, had a 250-watt signal incapable of reaching Rome at night; in contrast, WRUN, with its 5,000-watt signal, would have more of a regional reach. (WIBX, in turn, upgraded to 5,000 watts soon afterward.)

One of its announcers during WRUN's early days, in his first job as broadcaster, was a young radio announcer named Dick Clark, whose father was the manager of WRUN AM and FM (the FM half now WFRG-FM). He was known on-air as "Dick Clay", to avoid confusion with his father, who had the same name. The young Dick Clark would move to television, as anchor of the evening news program on WKTV, in 1951.

The Sentinel sold WRUN to Woods Communication Corporation in 1970; by then, it had a middle-of-the-road format, which evolved to a contemporary format by 1974. However, WRUN returned to MOR programming the following year. WRUN again changed its format in 1977, this time to top 40. The station was sold to WRUN, Inc. in 1978 and to Oneida Communications in 1985.

Forever Broadcasting bought the station in 1996. In the fall of 1997, the station began to relay sister country music station WFRG-FM; WRUN itself had applied for, but never used, the WFRG callsign in 1993. Forever sold its stations in the market to Regent Communications in 1999, and the following year, after a brief period simulcasting erstwhile competitor WIBX, WRUN began an adult standards format.

The format continued until 2005; that year, the station was sold to WAMC, who switched it to a relay of its public radio network. However, WAMC had been trying since 1998 to launch an FM relay of the network on 90.3 in nearby Remsen. When WRUN-FM finally signed on in December 2008, it determined that the AM station was no longer necessary, and sold it to Digital Radio Broadcasting in exchange for a translator in Cooperstown the following year. Upon assuming control that December, the new owners changed the call letters to WUTI, broadcasting a variety hits format with minimal interruption; by May 2010, the station began branding itself as "Ed 1150", including several thinly veiled references to Ed Levine, the owner of Galaxy Communications. That September, Leatherstocking Media Group began programming the station and implemented a simulcast of its Syracuse talk radio station WFBL, once again making WUTI a direct competitor to WIBX. Leatherstocking bought WUTI outright shortly afterward.

WUTI went off the air on May 23, 2013, after vandals stole the station's transmission line; at that time, the station was operating at reduced power, and had also been experiencing briefer interruptions due to unrelated technical problems with equipment used to receive programming from WFBL. Though the station initially planned to resume broadcasting within weeks, by that December WUTI remained silent, with plans to return to the air in the first quarter of 2014. The station ultimately did not sign back on within a year of going silent, and as a result its license was canceled by the Federal Communications Commission on August 11, 2014. Its studio in Whitestown, still zoned as a media studio, went into tax foreclosure and was auctioned off in September 2023 to a local car dealership in nearby Oriskany.
