= WSKU =

Radio station in Little Falls, New York

WSKS and WSKU

WSKS: Whitesboro, New York; WSKU: Little Falls, New York; United States
- Broadcast area: Utica-Rome
- Frequencies: WSKS: 97.9 MHz; WSKU: 105.5 MHz
- Branding: 97-9 & 105-5 Kiss FM

Programming
- Format: Contemporary hit radio

Ownership
- Owner: Roser Communications Network
- Sister stations: WBUG-FM; WBGK; WUTQ-FM

History
- First air date: WSKS: 1994; WSKU: 1990
- Former call signs: WSKS: WOWZ (1994–2001); WSKU: WOWB (1990–2001)
- Call sign meaning: KISS Utica

Technical information
- Licensing authority: FCC
- Facility ID: WSKS: 53630; WSKU: 67460
- Class: WSKS: A; WSKU: A
- ERP: WSKS: 1,500 watts; WSKU: 2,250 watts
- HAAT: WSKS: 204 meters (669 ft); WSKU: 161 meters (528 ft)
- Transmitter coordinates: WSKS: 43°2′14″N 75°26′40″W; WSKU: 42°59′27″N 74°55′6″W

Links
- Public license information: WSKS: Public file; LMS; WSKU: Public file; LMS
- Webcast: Listen live
- Website: cnykiss.com

WSKS (97.9 FM) and WSKU (105.5 FM) are radio stations simulcasting a contemporary hit radio format. Licensed to Whitesboro, New York and Little Falls, New York, the stations serve the Utica-Rome area and are owned by Roser Communications Network.

== History ==
WSKU signed on the air in 1990 as WOWB-FM 105.5, licensed to Little Falls. The station was licensed to Towpath Communications Limited as an adult contemporary station and after a brief stint as "B105" became "Wow 105".

The station was soon sold to the Professional Broadcasting Corporation (a joint venture of Frank DuRoss and Ken Roser), who added a simulcast on WOWZ at 97.9 FM in September 1994. Licensed to Whitesboro, it was the first allocation of 97.9 in the Utica market. The resulting simulcast was identified as Wow-FM.

WOWZ/WOWB became a rhythmic top 40 station in December 1996. Now known as "The Beat of Central New York", "Wow-FM" went in a dance direction with program director J.P. Marks, the nighttime air personality under the adult contemporary format, at the helm. Marks had previously been a nighttime and weekend air personality at Hot 107 (WRCK) before they changed format to classic rock.

WOWZ and WOWB were sold to Clear Channel Communications in 2000. The rhythmic top 40 format was abandoned and in 2001, WOWB became WSKU and WOWZ became WSKS, while the top 40 programming and "KISS FM" branding previously heard under the WSKS call letters at 102.5 FM (now WUMX) moved to WSKS/WSKU.

Clear Channel closed its Utica operations in 2007, and the KISS FM stations were sold to former co-owner Ken Roser, through his company Roser Communications. The format and branding of the stations remained the same, under program director and air personality Shaun Andrews.

A notable stunt occurred on WSKS/WSKU on May 18, 2009. In a news release issued by Roser Communications on the Friday before, the company announced that effective 7:30 a.m. on Monday the station was going to switch formats due to "financial constraints". On Monday, WSKS/WSKU, still feigning their format change, stopped playing their regular format at 7:31 a.m. and played the "beautiful music" format similar to that presented by then-sister stations WADR/WUTQ. A few hours later, WSKS/WSKU returned to its normal programming by announcing that all of the "format changes" were actually a publicity stunt to promote their new program lineup and radio hosts.

On March 30, 2015, Roser Communications moved the studios of all their stations, including WSKS/WSKU, to new facilities located at the Canal Park off Leland Avenue. Prior to this, Roser Communications had been leasing space at the Adirondack Bank building on Genesee Street.
