= WFRG-FM =

Radio station in Utica, New York

Coordinates: 43.0576°N 75.4174°W

- Utica, New York; United States
- Broadcast area: Utica-Rome, New York
- Frequency: 104.3 MHz
- Branding: Big Frog 104

Programming
- Format: Country
- Affiliations: Compass Media Networks; Westwood One

Ownership
- Owner: Townsquare Media; (Townsquare Media Licensee of Utica/Rome, Inc.)
- Sister stations: WIBX, WODZ-FM, WOUR, WLZW

History
- First air date: October 10, 1948; 78 years ago (as WRUN-FM)
- Former call signs: WRUN-FM (1948–1976); WKGW (1976–1993); WKFM (1993)
- Call sign meaning: "Frog"

Technical information
- Licensing authority: FCC
- Facility ID: 50362
- Class: B
- ERP: 100,000 watts
- HAAT: 139 meters

Links
- Public license information: Public file; LMS
- Webcast: Listen Live
- Website: bigfrog104.com

WFRG-FM (104.3 MHz), branded as Big Frog 104, is a country music radio station licensed to Utica, New York. Owned by Townsquare Media as part of a cluster with news-talk station WIBX, hot AC-formatted WLZW, classic hits-formatted WODZ and classic rock-formatted WOUR, it bills itself as "Central New York’s #1 For New Country".

== History ==
104.3 FM in Utica signed on the air in 1948 as WRUN-FM, a simulcast of AM station WRUN. In 1976 the station changed callsigns to WKGW and began airing an adult contemporary format under the name KG-104 then Magic 104. For many years, they were the market leading AC station, outlasting competitor WUUU in this format. In its later years, the name was changed to back to KG-104. Their market leading status would not last though. In 1989, now-sister station WLZW switched to an adult contemporary format, and toppled KG-104 from its market-leader status. In 1993, WKGW assumed the classic rock format and call letters of WKFM. These were formerly heard in the Syracuse market on 104.7 FM, which had changed to country-formatted B104.7 on June 1, 1993.

The country music format now heard on WFRG actually began on 95.9 FM (then 96.1 (now WODZ)) as "96 Frog". As part of an April Fool's Day gimmick, 96 Frog swapped frequencies with then-WKFM that day. The improved signal strength was so popular that, following the bankruptcy and shutdown of WKFM, the station applied for a frequency reassignment. When it was granted by the FCC, WFRG began calling itself Big Frog 104.

WFRG was previously owned by Forever Broadcasting (hence the "Big Frog" branding) but was sold to Regent Broadcasting (now Townsquare Media) in August 1999.

== Programming ==
In addition to the frog-themed local jocks used in most Froggy stations, WFRG also airs the syndicated programs Danny Wright, Retro Country USA, American Country Countdown and Taste of Country Nights.
