= Central New York =

Collection of counties situated in the heart of New York State

Coordinates: 43°N 75.8°W

The central region of New York State includes:

- Auburn in Cayuga County
- Cortland in Cortland County
- Oneida in Madison County
- Syracuse, the largest city of Central New York, in Onondaga County
- Fulton and Oswego in Oswego County

With a population of about 784,283 as of 2020 and an area of 3,715 square miles (9,620 km^{2}), the region includes the Syracuse metropolitan area.

== Definitions ==
The New York State Department of Transportation's definition of the Central and Eastern region of New York state includes the counties of Albany, Broome, Chenango, Columbia, Cortland, Delaware, Fulton, Greene, Herkimer, Madison, Montgomery, Oneida, Onondaga, Oswego, Otsego, Rensselaer, Saratoga, Schenectady, Schoharie, Sullivan, Ulster, and Washington, but does not commit itself to a definition of Central New York.

Cortland County and Tompkins County are often considered part of the New York State region called the Southern Tier; the ski country demarcation line runs through Cortland County. Tompkins County, which includes Ithaca at the edge of Cayuga Lake, is considered part of the Finger Lakes. Oneida County and Herkimer County are often considered part of New York state's Mohawk Valley, although Central New York and Mohawk Valley's geographic definitions overlap. Only Onondaga County, Cayuga County, Oswego County, and Madison County are always considered Central New York.

Daniel Koch writes in his book, Land of the Oneidas: Central New York State and the Creation of America, published in 2023, that "the term 'central New York' is a confounding one, which has been defined differently by various writers and agencies at different times." His work on central New York focuses on the homeland of the Oneida people along with the neighboring homelands of the Onondaga people to the west and the Mohawk people to the east.

== History ==
During the early historic period, the Haudenosaunee (Iroquois, Five Nations) successfully excluded Algonquian tribes from the region.

The Central New York Military Tract (land reserved for soldiers of the American Revolution) was located here. Many towns derived from the tracts have classical names.

== Higher education ==
Major colleges and universities in the region include:

- Cornell University
- Colgate University
- Hamilton College
- Le Moyne College
- SUNY Cortland
- SUNY ESF
- SUNY Morrisville
- SUNY Oswego
- SUNY Polytechnic Institute
- SUNY Upstate Medical University
- Syracuse University
- Utica University

== Media ==
Major newspapers in the region include the Oneida Daily Dispatch, Syracuse Post-Standard, Auburn Citizen, Rome Daily Sentinel, Ithaca Journal, and Utica Observer-Dispatch.

The region is served by several television stations based in Syracuse (including ABC affiliate WSYR-TV, NBC affiliate WSTM-TV, CBS affiliate WTVH, Fox affiliate WSYT and PBS member station WCNY-TV) and Utica (NBC/CBS affiliate WKTV, ABC affiliate WUTR and Fox TV affiliate WFXV).

== Speech patterns ==
Central New York is near the eastern edge of the dialect region known as the Inland North, which stretches as far west as Wisconsin. The region is characterized by the shift in vowel pronunciations known as the Northern Cities Vowel Shift, although in recent decades the shift has begun to fade out among younger generations.

Many Central New Yorkers pronounce words like elementary, documentary and complimentary with secondary stress on the -ary, so elementary becomes /ɛləˈmɛntˌɛri/, instead of the more widespread pronunciations of /ɛləˈmɛntəri/ and /ɛləˈmɛntri/. This feature is shared with the rest of Upstate New York.

The word soda is used for "soft drink" in Central New York; this distinguishes it linguistically from Western New York, where pop is traditionally used.

== See also ==
- Syracuse metropolitan area
