= WOUR =

Coordinates: 43.146°N 75.177°W

- Utica, New York; United States
- Broadcast area: Utica–Rome; Central New York
- Frequency: 96.9 MHz
- Branding: 96.9 WOUR

Programming
- Format: Classic rock
- Affiliations: Compass Media Networks

Ownership
- Owner: Townsquare Media; (Townsquare Media Licensee of Utica/Rome, Inc.)
- Sister stations: WFRG-FM, WIBX, WLZW, WODZ-FM

History
- First air date: June 1967; 59 years ago
- Call sign meaning: Utica–Rome

Technical information
- Licensing authority: FCC
- Facility ID: 4681
- Class: B
- ERP: 19,500 watts
- HAAT: 241 meters (791 ft)

Links
- Public license information: Public file; LMS
- Webcast: Listen live
- Website: www.wour.com

WOUR (96.9 FM) is a commercial radio station licensed to Utica, New York. It broadcasts a classic rock radio format, with occasional recent rock hits, calling itself "The Rock of Central New York". The station is owned by Townsquare Media as part of a cluster with talk station WIBX, country music station WFRG-FM, adult contemporary station WLZW and classic hits station WODZ-FM. The studios and offices are on River Road in Marcy. In morning drive time, WOUR carries the syndicated Free Beer and Hot Wings Show.

WOUR has an effective radiated power (ERP) of 19,500 watts. The transmitter is on Smith Hill Road at Cooley Road in Utica, amid the towers for other local FM and TV stations.

== History ==
=== Religion to rock ===
WOUR signed on in June 1967. It originally was a Christian radio station, owned by the Brinsfield Broadcasting Company. In 1970, it changed its format to the syndicated automated Adult Top 40 "Hit Parade '70" service. In 1971, it programmed "Hit Parade '71" by day, and progressive rock at night, with a live disc jockey during the rock hours. In 1973, WOUR became a full-time progressive rock station. Over time, the format segued to only the top tracks from the biggest selling albums, with a format known as album-oriented rock (AOR).

At that time, WOUR was the only AOR station in either Utica or Syracuse. The station was well known for a series of radio concerts broadcast live from local clubs including "Four Acres" in Marcy, New York. Artists who appeared in those live concerts included Elvis Costello, Blackjack (featuring Michael Bolton and Yellowjackets' bass player Jimmy Haslip), Cindy Bullens (with Central New York's Mark Doyle), Craig Fuller & Eric Kaz, Nick Gilder and The Ramones.

=== Interviews and personalities ===
WOUR also became known for presenting interviews with rock musicians, among them Boston's Tom Scholz (in one of his rare radio interviews), Journey's Steve Perry, Ross Vallory and Greg Rolie, Cheap Trick's Rick Nielsen, Lynyrd Skynyrd's Ed King, Charlie Daniels, Anthony Phillips, former Genesis guitarist Steve Hackett and John Hall of Orleans.

WOUR air personalities include John Cooper, Bob Lassiter, Tony Yoken, Steve Huntington, Bob London, Peter Hirsch, Dale Edwards, Tom Starr, Robin Sherwin, Jerry Kraus, "Genesee" Joe Trisolino, Alisson Ryan, J.P. Hastings and many more. A morning drive show with Hirsch and Bill Houser became popular among WOUR listeners in the late-1970s to early-1980s.

=== Changes in ownership ===
Previous owners have included Bunkfeldt Broadcasting, Dame Media and Clear Channel Communications. Clear Channel (today's iHeartMedia) sold WOUR to Galaxy Communications in 2007 when it decided to exit small markets and go private. Galaxy, which already owned WRCK, also a classic rock station, sold WRCK to religious broadcaster Educational Media Foundation, and purchased WOUR. Under Galaxy ownership, WOUR brought "Fireworks Over Utica" back, brought Dickey Betts to Hanna Park, created the annual Wine & Chocolate event, created Fan Fest for the Utica Comets season kick-off and adjusted the station's classic rock playlist.

In 2016, Galaxy moved the company's Utica studios (WKLL, WOUR, WUMX, WTLB, WRNY and WIXT) from Washington Mills to Downtown Utica inside the new landmark building (the old HSBC Location) and renamed it Galaxy Media. Inside their new location the walls on the side of the street for each studio are made entirely of glass, allowing people to see DJs at work.

On February 15, 2018, Townsquare Media announced it had agreed to purchase WOUR. The sale was approved by the FCC on September 24, 2018, and finalized on October 2, 2018. WOUR's studios moved to the Townsquare Media complex in Marcy, New York.
