= Deerfield, New York =

- Town
- Location in Oneida County and the state of New York.
- Coordinates: 43°10′28″N 75°9′42″W
- Country: United States
- State: New York
- County: Oneida

Government
  - Type: Town Council
  - Town Supervisor: Gregory Sacco (D)
  - Town Council: Members' List: • Gregory Sacco (D); • Phil Domser (D); • Michael Collins (D); • David Kolek (R)

Area
  - Total: 33.05 sq mi (85.60 km^{2})
  - Land: 32.94 sq mi (85.32 km^{2})
  - Water: 0.11 sq mi (0.28 km^{2})
- Elevation: 1,014 ft (309 m)

Population (2010)
  - Total: 4,273
  - Estimate (2016): 4,249
  - Density: 129/sq mi (49.8/km^{2})
- Time zone: UTC-5 (Eastern (EST))
  - Summer (DST): UTC-4 (EDT)
- ZIP Codes: 13502 (Deerfield); 13304 (Barneveld); 13431 (Poland)
- Area code: 315
- FIPS code: 36-19928
- GNIS feature ID: 0978891
- Website: www.townofdeerfield.org

Deerfield is a town in Oneida County, New York, United States. The population was 4,273 at the 2010 census.

The Town of Deerfield is on the eastern border of the county and northeast of the City of Utica.

== History ==
Deerfield was formed from the Town of Schuyler in 1798.

In Walter D. Edmonds' 1936 novel "Drums Along the Mohawk" and the 1939 film of the same name, the story portrays settlers of the New York frontier in the 1700s. The main protagonists (played in the film by Henry Fonda and Claudette Colbert) leave their luxurious home to build a small frontier farm in Deerfield in the Mohawk Valley.

== Geography ==
According to the United States Census Bureau, the town, which lies immediately north of the city of Utica, has a total area of 33.1 square miles (86 km^{2}), of which 32.9 square miles (85 km^{2}) is land and 0.1 square miles (0.26 km^{2}) (0.39%) is water.

The eastern town line is the border of Herkimer County. The New York State Thruway and the Erie Canal pass south of the town. The Mohawk River once formed the southern border of the town but has since been annexed into Utica.

== Demographics ==
Historical population
Census	Pop.	Note	%±
1800	1,048		—
1810	1,232		17.6%
1820	2,346		90.4%
1830	4,182		78.3%
1840	3,120		−25.4%
1850	2,287		−26.7%
1860	2,249		−1.7%
1870	2,045		−9.1%
1880	2,082		1.8%
1890	1,954		−6.1%
1900	1,756		−10.1%
1910	1,660		−5.5%
1920	706		−57.5%
1930	983		39.2%
1940	1,147		16.7%
1950	1,621		41.3%
1960	3,554		119.2%
1970	4,104		15.5%
1980	3,934		−4.1%
1990	3,942		0.2%
2000	3,909		−0.8%
2010	4,273		9.3%
2016 (est.)	4,249		−0.6%
U.S. Decennial Census

As of the census of 2000, there were 3,906 people, 1,449 households, and 1,146 families residing in the town. The population density was 118.6 inhabitants per square mile (45.8/km^{2}). There were 1,512 housing units at an average density of 45.9 per square mile (17.7/km^{2}). The racial makeup of the town was 98.75% White, 0.59% African American, 0.05% Native American, 0.28% Asian, 0.03% from other races, and 0.31% from two or more races. Hispanic or Latino of any race were 0.72% of the population.

There were 1,449 households, out of which 35.0% had children under the age of 18 living with them, 68.9% were married couples living together, 7.2% had a female householder with no husband present, and 20.9% were non-families. 17.8% of all households were made up of individuals, and 9.0% had someone living alone who was 65 years of age or older. The average household size was 2.70 and the average family size was 3.06.

In the town, the population was spread out, with 25.5% under the age of 18, 5.5% from 18 to 24, 27.0% from 25 to 44, 26.1% from 45 to 64, and 15.9% who were 65 years of age or older. The median age was 40 years. For every 100 females, there were 99.3 males. For every 100 females age 18 and over, there were 97.7 males.

The median income for a household in the town was $47,197, and the median income for a family was $53,631. Males had a median income of $37,540 versus $24,441 for females. The per capita income for the town was $20,676. About 2.0% of families and 3.8% of the population were below the poverty line, including 0.5% of those under age 18 and 8.1% of those age 65 or over.

== Communities and locations in Deerfield ==
- Bell Hill – An elevation located northeast of Utica; partially in Herkimer County.
- Deerfield – The hamlet of Deerfield is a northern suburb of the City of Utica. The community is located on Route 5 by the Mohawk River and Erie Canal.
- Deerfield Heights – Another suburb of Utica, north of Deerfield.
- Dewey Corners – A location south of Dewey Corners on Route 8.
- North Gage – A hamlet in the northwestern part of the town.
- Smith Hill – An elevation located northeast of Utica.
- Walker Corners – A location east of North Gage, located on Route 8.

== Notable people ==
- John Atkinson (1835–1897), born in Deerfield, noted Methodist clergyman and author
- Pádraig Phiarais Cúndún (1777-1856), Irish-American poet in the Irish language from Ballymacoda, County Cork, who settled with his family on a homestead near Deerfield around 1826.
- Hanmer Robbins (1815–1890), Wisconsin State Assemblyman
- Michael Zarnock, published author/columnist and two-time Guinness World Record holder, born April 21, 1958, in Utica; moved to Deerfield in 1998.
