= WKVU =

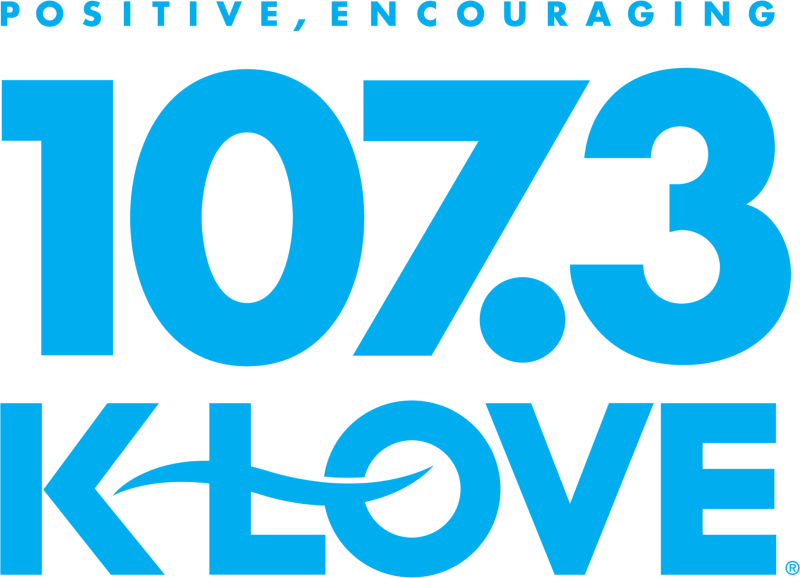
- Utica, New York; United States
- Broadcast area: Utica–Rome metropolitan area
- Frequency: 107.3 MHz
- Branding: K-Love

Programming
- Format: Christian adult contemporary
- Network: K-Love

Ownership
- Owner: Educational Media Foundation
- Sister stations: WAWR

History
- First air date: April 23, 1962
- Former call signs: WUFM (1962–1970); WZOW (1970–1975); WTLB-FM (1975–1981); WRCK (1981–2010)
- Call sign meaning: K-Love Utica

Technical information
- Licensing authority: FCC
- Facility ID: 54549
- Class: B
- ERP: 50,000 watts
- HAAT: 152 meters (499 ft)
- Transmitter coordinates: 43°8′40″N 75°10′32″W

Links
- Public license information: Public file; LMS
- Webcast: Listen live
- Website: www.klove.com

WKVU (107.3 FM) is a radio station broadcasting a Christian adult contemporary format. Licensed to Utica, New York, United States, the station serves the Utica–Rome metropolitan area. The station is currently owned by the Educational Media Foundation, and is an affiliate of the K-Love network.

== History ==
WKVU signed on in 2001, on 100.7 FM, when Bethany Broadcasting sold its religious station broadcasting on that frequency, WVVC, to the Educational Media Foundation (EMF). Upon acquiring WVVC, EMF changed its call sign to WKVU and began simulcasting its K-Love satellite format of Christian adult contemporary music on the station.

The 107.3 facility was previously owned by Galaxy Communications, who ran a classic rock format on the frequency under the call sign WRCK and slogan Rock 107. Prior to this WRCK was a longtime powerhouse Top 40 station. During this time, WRCK was known as Power Hits Rock 107 until March 17, 1994, when they changed their name to Hot 107. However, their Top 40 format lasted until June 13, 1994, when The Radio Corporation (forerunner of Galaxy Communications) purchased the station from H & D Entertainment Incorporated saddening and upsetting listeners who listened to Top 40 music in the Utica-Rome area about the takeover and format change to classic rock. In October 2007, Galaxy purchased a portion of Clear Channel Communications' Utica cluster, including WRCK's rival, WOUR. WOUR's signal was deemed to be stronger and more favorable than WRCK's and so WRCK was spun off to EMF. Some of WRCK's former staff moved to WOUR. EMF then announced that it would keep the WRCK call letters and simulcast their Christian rock satellite format Air1 on the station. WRCK's last song as Rock 107 was Led Zeppelin's "Stairway to Heaven" before the Air1 satellite feed was picked up.

Back during the early 1980s, the WRCK calls belonged to ABC Radio Networks owned-and-operated WRCK-FM 95 (dial position 94.7) in Chicago. In 1980, the station changed its calls to WLS-FM to join with its sister AM station, WLS, while the WRCK calls went to Utica.

On December 15, 2010, WRCK swapped frequencies with WKVU, with WRCK (and its Air1 affiliation) moving to 100.7 FM and WKVU moving to 107.3 FM. The next year, EMF sold WRCK to Ken Roser, who renamed the station WUTQ-FM and began simulcasting the full service–soft adult contemporary format then heard on sister stations WUTQ and WADR, which assumed the WRCK callsign. EMF then moved its Air1 affiliation to WOKR, which would change its call sign to WARW in January 2015.

== Former on-air staff ==
- Gomez and Dave (Mornings as under the classic rock format)
- Paul Szmal
- Bill Keeler (Morning announcer under the Top 40 & classic rock formats)
- Gary Spears
- Frank McBride
- J.P. Marks
- Bill Whiteman
- 'Big' Larry Williams (deceased)
- B.B. Good (She worked on Radio Disney)
- Bud in the Night Time
- John Carucci
- JR Jim Reitz (deceased)
- Karen Hanna (deceased)
- Scott Burton
- Ugly Michaels Mike Hotaling
- Kevin Quinn
- Cheri Kendall
- Rich Lundy Bramley
- Nick at Night Norod
- Kelly Steve Abel
- Rick Pendleton
- Becky Williams
- Janet Bauer
- Kym Charmicheal
