= List of radio stations in New York =

The following is a list of FCC-licensed radio stations in the U.S. state of New York, which can be sorted by their call signs, frequencies, cities of license, licensees, and programming formats.

== List of radio stations in New York state ==
Call sign	Frequency	City of license	Licensee	Format
WAAL	99.1 FM	Binghamton	Townsquare License, LLC	Classic rock
WABC	770 AM	New York City	Red Apple Media, Inc.	News/talk (oldies "MUSICRADIO" on weekends/holidays)
WABH	1380 AM	Bath	Tower Broadcasting, LLC	Classic country
WABY	900 AM	Watervliet	Saratoga Radio LLC	1990s-2000s rock
WACK	1420 AM	Newark	Waynco Radio, Inc.	News/talk
WADO	1280 AM	New York City	Univision Radio Stations Group, Inc.	Spanish sports (TUDN)
WAER	88.3 FM	Syracuse	Syracuse University	Public radio
WAIB-LP	88.5 FM	Redwood	Betterarts, Inc.	Variety
WAIO	95.1 FM	Honeoye Falls	iHM Licenses, LLC	Hot talk/active rock
WAIV	91.7 FM	Kingston	Educational Media Foundation	Christian worship (Air1)
WAJZ	96.3 FM	Voorheesville	6 Johnson Road Licenses, Inc.	Rhythmic contemporary
WALF	89.7 FM	Alfred	Alfred University	Variety
WALK-FM	97.5 FM	Patchogue	Connoisseur Media Licenses, LLC	Hot adult contemporary
WALL	1340 AM	Middletown	Digital radio Broadcasting, Inc.	Classic hits
WAMC	1400 AM	Albany	WAMC, Inc.	Public radio
WAMC-FM	90.3 FM	Albany	WAMC, Inc.	Public radio
WAMK	90.9 FM	Kingston	WAMC, Inc.	Public radio
WANC	103.9 FM	Ticonderoga	WAMC, Inc.	Public radio
WANR	88.5 FM	Brewster	WAMC	Public radio
WANZ	90.1 FM	Stamford	WAMC, Inc.	Public radio
WAPP-LP	100.3 FM	Westhampton	Aquila Broadcasting Corp.	Religious
WAQX-FM	95.7 FM	Manlius	Radio License Holding CBC, LLC	Alternative rock
WARW	96.7 FM	Port Chester	Educational Media Foundation	Christian worship (Air1)
WARY	88.1 FM	Valhalla	Westchester Community College	Variety
WATN	1240 AM	Watertown	Community Broadcasters, LLC	News/talk
WAUB	1590 AM	Auburn	Auburn Broadcasting, Inc.	News/talk
WAVR	102.1 FM	Waverly	WATS UP, LLC	Adult contemporary
WAWR	93.5 FM	Remsen	Educational Media Foundation	Christian worship (Air1)
WAXQ	104.3 FM	New York City	iHM Licenses, LLC	Classic rock
WAYO-LP	104.3 FM	Rochester	MUCCC, Inc.	Variety
WBAB	102.3 FM	Babylon	CMG NY/Texas Radio, LLC	Classic rock
WBAI	99.5 FM	New York City	Pacifica Foundation, Inc.	Public Radio
WBAR-FM	94.7 FM	Lake Luzerne	Capital Media Corporation	Christian radio
WBAZ	102.5 FM	Bridgehampton	LRS Radio, LLC	Adult contemporary
WBBF	1120 AM	Buffalo	Radio License Holding CBC, LLC	Sports (ESPN)
WBBI	107.5 FM	Endwell	iHM Licenses, LLC	Country
WBBR	1130 AM	New York City	Bloomberg Communications Inc.	Business news
WBBS	104.7 FM	Fulton	iHM Licenses, LLC	Country
WBDR	106.7 FM	Copenhagen	Community Broadcasters, LLC	Top 40 (CHR)
WBDY-LP	99.5 FM	Binghamton	The Bundy Museum of History & Art	Variety
WBEA	101.7 FM	Southold	LRS Radio, LLC	Rhythmic contemporary
WBEE-FM	92.5 FM	Rochester	Audacy License, LLC	Country
WBEN	930 AM	Buffalo	Audacy License, LLC	News/talk
WBER	90.5 FM	Rochester	Monroe BOCES#1	Alternative
WBFO	88.7 FM	Buffalo	Western New York Public Broadcasting Association	Public radio
WBGK	99.7 FM	Newport Village	Roser Communications Network, Inc.	Country
WBKT	95.3 FM	Norwich	Townsquare License, LLC	Country
WBKV	102.5 FM	Buffalo	Educational Media Foundation	Contemporary Christian (K-Love)
WBKX	96.5 FM	Fredonia	Chadwick Bay Broadcasting	Country
WBLH	92.5 FM	Black River	Radioactive, LLC	Adult hits
WBLI	106.1 FM	Patchogue	CMG NY/Texas Radio, LLC	Top 40 (CHR)
WBLK	93.7 FM	Depew	Townsquare Media of Buffalo, Inc.	Urban contemporary
WBLN-LP	104.9 FM	Glens Falls	Better Living Radio, Inc.	Christian radio
WBLS	107.5 FM	New York City	Mediaco WBLS License LLC	Urban adult contemporary
WBNR	1260 AM	Beacon	6 Johnson Road Licenses, Inc.	Conservative talk
WBNW-FM	105.7 FM	Endicott	iHM Licenses, LLC	Top 40 (CHR)
WBNY	91.3 FM	Buffalo	State University of New York	Campus radio
WBON	98.5 FM	Westhampton	JVC Media LLC, a Florida LLC Company	Spanish/tropical
WBPM	92.9 FM	Saugerties	6 Johnson Road Licenses, Inc.	Classic hits
WBQE-LP	102.3 FM	Brooklyn	Educational Lab Inc.	Variety
WBRV	900 AM	Boonville	The Flack Broadcasting Group L.L.C.	Classic rock
WBRV-FM	101.3 FM	Boonville	The Flack Broadcasting Group L.L.C.	Country
WBSU	89.1 FM	Brockport	State University of New York	Pop, rock, rap
WBTA	1490 AM	Batavia	Majic Tones Communications, LLC	Soft adult contemporary
WBTZ	99.9 FM	Plattsburgh	Hall Communications	Alternative rock
WBUF	92.9 FM	Buffalo	Townsquare Media of Buffalo, Inc.	Mainstream rock
WBUG-FM	101.1 FM	Fort Plain	Roser Communications Network, Inc.	Country
WBWA	89.9 FM	Buffalo	Educational Media Foundation	Christian worship (Air1)
WBWD	540 AM	Islip	Metro Mex USA, LLC	Bollywood (Indian) music
WBWZ	93.3 FM	New Paltz	iHM Licenses, LLC	Classic rock
WBXL	90.5 FM	Baldwinsville	Baldwinsville Central School District	Variety
WBZA	98.9 FM	Rochester	Audacy License, LLC	Adult hits
WCAA-LP	107.3 FM	Albany	Grand Street Community Arts, Inc.	Variety
WCAN	93.3 FM	Canajoharie	WAMC	Public radio
WCBF	96.1 FM	Elmira	Seven Mountains Media	Country
WCBS-FM	101.1 FM	New York City	Audacy License, LLC	Classic hits
WCDB	90.9 FM	Albany	State University of New York	Freeform/alternative
WCDO	1490 AM	Sidney	CDO Broadcasting, Inc.	Adult contemporary
WCDO-FM	100.9 FM	Sidney	CDO Broadcasting, Inc.	Adult contemporary
WCDW	106.7 FM	Port Dickinson	Equinox Broadcasting Corp.	Classic hits
WCEB	94.7 FM	Deposit	Family Life Ministries, Inc.	Christian radio (Family Life Network)
WCEG	100.3 FM	Delhi	Family Life Ministries, Inc.	Christian radio (Family Life Network)
WCEL	91.9 FM	Plattsburgh	WAMC	Public radio
WCER	97.5 FM	Delhi	Family Life Ministries, Inc.	Christian radio (Family Life Network)
WCGP	89.3 FM	Silver Creek	Family Life Ministries, Inc.	Christian radio (Family Life Network)
WCGR	1550 AM	Canandaigua	The Fingerlakes Radio Group, Inc.	Classic rock
WCGS	105.9 FM	Little Valley	Family Life Ministries, Inc.	Christian radio (Family Life Network)
WCHP	760 AM	Champlain	Champlain Radio, Inc.	Christian radio
WCID	101.1 FM	Enfield	Family Life Ministries, Inc.	Christian radio (Family Life Network)
WCIG	97.7 FM	Big Flats	Family Life Ministries, Inc.	Christian radio (Family Life Network)
WCIH	94.3 FM	Elmira	Family Life Ministries, Inc.	Christian radio (Family Life Network)
WCII	88.5 FM	Spencer	Family Life Ministries, Inc.	Christian radio (Family Life Network)
WCIJ	88.9 FM	Unadilla	Family Life Ministries, Inc.	Christian radio (Family Life Network)
WCIK	103.1 FM	Avoca	Family Life Ministries, Inc.	Christian radio (Family Life Network)
WCIM	104.9 FM	Montour Falls	Family Life Ministries, Inc.	Christian radio (Family Life Network)
WCIN	88.3 FM	Bath	Family Life Ministries, Inc.	Christian radio (Family Life Network)
WCIO	96.7 FM	Oswego	Family Life Ministries, Inc.	Christian radio (Family Life Network)
WCIP	93.7 FM	Clyde	Family Life Ministries, Inc.	Christian radio (Family Life Network)
WCIS-FM	105.1 FM	DeRuyter	Family Life Ministries, Inc.	Christian radio (Family Life Network)
WCIT-FM	106.3 FM	Oneida	Family Life Ministries, Inc.	Christian radio (Family Life Network)
WCIY	88.9 FM	Canandaigua	Family Life Ministries, Inc.	Christian radio (Family Life Network)
WCIZ-FM	93.3 FM	Watertown	Stephens Media Group Watertown	Classic hits
WCJW	1140 AM	Warsaw	Lloyd Lane, Incorporated	Country
WCKM-FM	98.5 FM	Lake George	Regional Radio Group, LLC	Classic hits
WCKR	92.1 FM	Hornell	PMJ Communications, Inc.	Top 40 (CHR)
WCLP-LP	98.3 FM	Lake Placid	Light of Truth, Inc.	Catholic
WCLX-LP	107.3 FM	Moriah	Champlain Music Appreciation Society, Inc.	Christian radio
WCMF-FM	96.5 FM	Rochester	Audacy License, LLC	Classic rock
WCNY-FM	91.3 FM	Syracuse	Public Broadcasting Council of Central New York	Classical
WCOF	89.5 FM	Arcade	Family Life Ministries, Inc.	Christian radio (Family Life Network)
WCOM-FM	90.7 FM	Kendall	Family Life Ministries, Inc.	Christian radio (Family Life Network)
WCOQ	101.9 FM	Alfred	Sound Communications, LLC	Country
WCOU	88.3 FM	Attica	Family Life Ministries, Inc.	Christian radio (Family Life Network)
WCOV-FM	89.1 FM	Friendship	Family Life Ministries, Inc.	Christian radio (Family Life Network)
WCPV	101.3 FM	Essex	Vox AM/FM, LLC	News/talk
WCQL	95.9 FM	Queensbury	Regional Radio Group, LLC	Top 40 (CHR)
WCSQ-LP	105.9 FM	Cobleskill	Dialogos of Cobleskill, Incorporated	Ethnic/Greek
WCSS	1490 AM	Amsterdam	Cranesville Block Company	News/talk
WCTW	98.5 FM	Catskill	iHM Licenses, LLC	Hot adult contemporary
WCVF-FM	88.9 FM	Fredonia	Board of Trustees of State University of New York	Variety
WCWP	88.1 FM	Brookville	Long Island University Public Radio Network	Top 40, jazz, sports, news, Latino, rap
WCZX	97.7 FM	Hyde Park	Townsquare License, LLC	Country
WDBA-LP	105.5 FM	Farmingdale	Fuente de Luz Radio, Inc.	Country
WDBY	105.5 FM	Patterson	Townsquare License, LLC	Country
WDCX	990 AM	Rochester	Kimtron Inc	Religious
WDCX-FM	99.5 FM	Buffalo	Kimtron, Inc.	Religious
WDCZ	970 AM	Buffalo	Kimtron, Inc.	News/talk
WDKX	103.9 FM	Rochester	Monroe County Broadcasting Co., Ltd.	Urban contemporary
WDLA	1270 AM	Walton	Townsquare License, LLC	News/talk/sports
WDLA-FM	92.1 FM	Walton	Townsquare License, LLC	Country
WDLC	1490 AM	Port Jervis	Neversink Broadcasting Company, LLC	Country
WDMB-LP	105.5 FM	Queens	The Roman Catholic Diocese of Brooklyn	Religious
WDNB	102.1 FM	Jeffersonville	Bold Gold Media Group, L.P.	Country
WDNY	1400 AM	Dansville	Genesee Media Corporation	Classic hits
WDOE	1410 AM	Dunkirk	Chadwick Bay Broadcasting Corporation	Classic hits
WDRE	1570 AM	Riverhead	JVC Media LLC	News/talk
WDRX-LP	100.7 FM	Cortland	Cortland Christian Radio, Inc.	Christian radio
WDST	100.1 FM	Woodstock	Chet-5 Broadcasting, L.P.	Adult album alternative
WDVI	100.5 FM	Rochester	iHM Licenses, LLC	Country
WDWN	89.1 FM	Auburn	Cayuga County Community College	Alternative
WDXT	93.9 FM	Dansville	Genesee Media Corporation	Classic rock
WEAV	960 AM	Plattsburgh	Vox AM/FM, LLC	Sports (FSR)
WEBG	95.9 FM	Mina	iHM Licenses, LLC	Sports (FSR)
WEBO	1330 AM	Owego	Radigan Broadcasting Group, LLC	Adult contemporary & news
WEBR	1440 AM	Niagara Falls	Kenmore Broadcasting Communications, Inc.	Soft adult contemporary
WECK	1230 AM	Cheektowaga	Radio One Buffalo, LLC	Oldies
WECW	107.7 FM	Elmira	Elmira College	Independent
WEDG	103.3 FM	Buffalo	Radio License Holding CBC, LLC	Alternative rock
WEER	88.7 FM	Montauk	Eastern Tower Corp.	Public radio
WEFX	100.7 FM	Henderson	Community Broadcasters, LLC	Country
WEGB	90.7 FM	Napeague	Community Bible Church	Christian radio
WEGQ	91.7 FM	Quogue	Community Bible Church	Christian radio
WEHM	92.9 FM	Southampton	LRS Radio, LLC	Adult album alternative
WEHN	96.9 FM	East Hampton	LRS Radio, LLC	Adult album alternative
WELJ	104.7 FM	Montauk	BOLD Broadcasting, LLC	Soft adult contemporary/oldies
WELM	1410 AM	Elmira	Tower Broadcasting LLC	Top 40 (CHR)
WELV-LP	107.9 FM	Ellenville	Ellenville Central School District	Variety
WENE	1430 AM	Endicott	iHM Licenses, LLC	Sports (FSR)
WENI	1450 AM	Corning	Southern Belle, LLC	Classic country
WENT	1340 AM	Gloversville	Thnk Tank Media, Inc.	Full service
WENU	1410 AM	South Glen Falls	6 Johnson Road Licenses, Inc.	Soft oldies
WEOK	1390 AM	Poughkeepsie	Townsquare License, LLC	Regional Mexican
WEOS	89.5 FM	Geneva	Hobart and William Smith Colleges	NPR
WEPL-LP	97.1 FM	Rochester	Ibero American Action League	Spanish hits
WEPN	1050 AM	New York City	Good Karma Broadcasting, L.L.C.	Sports (ESPN)
WEPN-FM	98.7 FM	New York City	Emmis Radio License Corporation of New York	Bilingual AC
WEXP	102.9 FM	Westport	Sun Signals LLC	AAA, progressive, blues, R&B, jazz & folk
WEXT	97.7 FM	Amsterdam	WMHT Educational Telecommunications	Adult album alternative
WFAN	660 AM	New York City	Audacy License, LLC	Sports (ISN)
WFAN-FM	101.9 FM	New York City	Audacy License, LLC	Sports (ISN)
WFBL	1390 AM	Syracuse	Wolf Radio, Inc.	Classic hits
WFFG-FM	100.3 FM	Warrensburg	6 Johnson Road Licenses, Inc.	Country
WFGB	89.7 FM	Kingston	Sound of Life, Inc.	Christian radio
WFIZ	95.5 FM	Odessa	Saga Communications of New England, LLC	Top 40 (CHR)
WFKL	93.3 FM	Fairport	Stephens Media Group – Rochester, LLC	Adult hits
WFLK	99.3 FM	Seneca Falls	Auburn Broadcasting, Inc.	Classic hits
WFLR	1570 AM	Dundee	Finger Lakes Radio Group, Inc.	Country
WFLY	92.3 FM	Troy	6 Johnson Road Licenses, Inc.	Top 40 (CHR)
WFME	1560 AM	New York City	Family Stations, Inc.	Christian radio
WFME-FM	92.7 FM	Garden City	Family Stations, Inc.	Christian radio (Family Radio)
WFNP	88.7 FM	Rosendale	State University of New York	College radio
WFNY	1440 AM	Gloversville	Michael A. Sleezer	Variety
WFRG-FM	104.3 FM	Utica	Townsquare Media Licensee of Utica/Rome, Inc.	Country
WFRS	88.9 FM	Smithtown	Family Stations, Inc.	Christian radio (Family Radio)
WFRY-FM	97.5 FM	Watertown	Stephens Media Group Watertown	Country
WFSO	88.3 FM	Olivebridge	Redeemer Broadcasting, Inc.	Christian radio
WFUV	90.7 FM	New York City	Fordham University	Public radio, adult album alternative
WGBB	1240 AM	Freeport	WGBB-AM, Inc.	Ethnic
WGDJ	1300 AM	Rensselaer	Capital Broadcasting, Inc.	Talk
WGFR	92.7 FM	Glens Falls	Board of Trustees of Adirondack College	Adult album alternative
WGGO	1590 AM	Salamanca	Holy Family Communications	Catholic
WGHQ	920 AM	Kingston	6 Johnson Road Licenses, Inc.	Conservative talk
WGKR	105.3 FM	Grand Gorge	Sound of Life, Inc.	Christian radio
WGKV	101.7 FM	Pulaski	Educational Media Foundation	Contemporary Christian (K-Love)
WGMC	90.1 FM	Greece	Greece Central School District	Jazz, ethnic
WGNA-FM	107.7 FM	Albany	Townsquare Media of Albany, Inc.	Country
WGNY	1220 AM	Newburgh	Sunrise Broadcasting Corporation	News/talk/sports
WGNY-FM	98.9 FM	Rosendale	Hawkeye Communications, Inc.	Oldies
WGR	550 AM	Buffalo	Audacy License, LLC	Sports (ISN)
WGR-FM	107.7 FM	Wethersfield Township	Audacy License, LLC	Sports
WGRF	96.9 FM	Buffalo	Radio License Holding CBC, LLC	Classic rock
WGSS	89.3 FM	Copiague	Calvary Chapel of Hope	Christian radio
WGSU	89.3 FM	Geneseo	State University of New York	Alternative
WGVA	1240 AM	Geneva	Geneva Broadcasting Inc.	News/talk
WGWR	88.1 FM	Liberty	Sound of Life, Inc.	Christian radio
WGXC	90.7 FM	Acra	Free103Point9	Community radio
WGY	810 AM	Schenectady	iHM Licenses, LLC	News/talk
WGY-FM	103.1 FM	Albany	iHM Licenses, LLC	News/talk
WHAM	1180 AM	Rochester	iHM Licenses, LLC	News/talk
WHAZ	1330 AM	Troy	Capital Media Corporation	Christian radio
WHAZ-FM	97.5 FM	Hoosick Falls	Capital Media Corporation	Christian radio
WHCL-FM	88.7 FM	Clinton	Trustees of Hamilton College	Variety
WHCR-FM	90.3 FM	New York City	City College of New York	College radio
WHCU	870 AM	Ithaca	Saga Communications of New England, LLC	News/talk
WHEN	620 AM	Syracuse	iHM Licenses, LLC	Urban adult contemporary
WHFM	95.3 FM	Southampton	CMG NY/Texas Radio, LLC	Classic rock
WHIC	1460 AM	Rochester	Holy Family Communications	Catholic
WHIH-LP	97.3 FM	Whitesboro	Lifepoint Church of the Mohawk Valley	Religious teaching
WHLI	1100 AM	Hempstead	Connoisseur Media Licenses, LLC	Oldies (50's-70's)
WHMV-LP	97.5 FM	Mohawk	Mohawk Valley Radio Group	Variety
WHNB	104.5 FM	Hancock	Bold Gold Media Group, L.P.	Country
WHPC	90.3 FM	Garden City	Nassau Community College	Freeform
WHRW	90.5 FM	Binghamton	State University of New York at Binghamton	Freeform
WHSQ	880 AM	New York City	Audacy License, LLC	Sports
WHTK	1280 AM	Rochester	iHM Licenses, LLC	Sports (FSR)
WHTT-FM	104.1 FM	Buffalo	Radio License Holding CBC, LLC	Classic hits
WHUC	1230 AM	Hudson	iHM Licenses, LLC	Country
WHUD	100.7 FM	Peekskill	6 Johnson Road Licenses, Inc.	Adult contemporary
WHUG	101.9 FM	Jamestown	Media One Holdings, LLC	Country
WHVC	102.5 FM	Rhinebeck	Christian Media Associates, Inc.	Religious
WHVM	91.9 FM	Owego	Holy Family Communications	
WHVP	91.1 FM	Hudson	Sound of Life, Inc.	Christian radio
WHVW	950 AM	Hyde Park	Joseph Paul Ferraro	Americana
WHWK	98.1 FM	Binghamton	Townsquare License, LLC	Country
WHWS-LP	105.7 FM	Geneva	Hobart and William Smith Colleges	Spanish/adult contemporary
WIBX	950 AM	Utica	Townsquare Media Licensee of Utica/Rome, Inc.	News/talk
WICB	91.7 FM	Ithaca	Ithaca College	Alternative
WICY	1490 AM	Malone	Cartier Communications Inc.	Country
WIFF	90.1 FM	Windsor	CSN International	Religious (CSN International)
WIHR-LP	94.1 FM	Jamestown	Advent Radio Ministries Corporation	Christian radio
WIII	99.9 FM	Cortland	Saga Communications of New England, LLC	Classic rock
WINO	91.9 FM	Watkins Glen	Ithaca Community Radio, Inc.	Community radio
WINR	680 AM	Binghamton	iHM Licenses, LLC	Classic country
WINS	1010 AM	New York City	Audacy License, LLC	News
WINS-FM	92.3 FM	New York City	Audacy License, LLC	News
WINU	104.9 FM	Altamont	6 Johnson Road Licenses, Inc.	Classic country
WIOF-LP	104.1 FM	Woodstock	Birds of a Feather Media Limited	Variety/Pacifica
WIOX	91.3 FM	Roxbury	WIOX, Inc.	Variety
WIRQ	90.9 FM	Rochester	West Irondequoit Central School District	Alternative
WIRY	1340 AM	Plattsburgh	Hometown Communications, LLC	Full service
WITC	88.9 FM	Cazenovia	Cazenovia College	Variety
WITH	90.1 FM	Ithaca	Hobart and William Smith Colleges	Adult album alternative/talk
WITR	89.7 FM	Henrietta	Rochester Institute of Technology	College radio
WIXT	1230 AM	Little Falls	Galaxy Utica Licensee LLC	Adult hits
WIZR	930 AM	Johnstown	Cranesville Block Company, Inc.	Hot adult contemporary
WJCA	102.1 FM	Albion	Family Worship Center Church, Inc.	Christian radio
WJDM	1520 AM	Mineola	Cantico Nuevo Ministry, Inc.	Gospel
WJFF	90.5 FM	Jeffersonville	Radio Catskill, Inc.	Public radio
WJGK	103.1 FM	Newburgh	Sunrise Broadcasting Corporation	Adult contemporary
WJIH-LP	95.9 FM	Oneonta	Spirit and Truth Christian Assembly	Religious teaching
WJIP	1370 AM	Ellenville	iHM Licenses, LLC	News/talk
WJIV	101.9 FM	Cherry Valley	Christian Broadcasting System, Ltd.	Religious
WJJF	94.9 FM	Montauk	Red Wolf Broadcasting Corporation	News/talk
WJKE	101.3 FM	Stillwater	Educational Media Foundation	Contemporary Christian (K-Love)
WJKS	104.3 FM	Keeseville	Great Eastern Radio, LLC	Country
WJMP	1070 AM	Plattsburgh	A & J Radio LLC	Classic hip hop
WJNN-LP	104.1 FM	Fallsburg	Torah Treasure House	Religious teaching
WJNY	90.9 FM	Watertown	Public Broadcasting Council of Central New York	Classical
WJPZ-FM	89.1 FM	Syracuse	WJPZ Radio, Inc.	Rhythmic contemporary
WJQZ	103.5 FM	Wellsville	DBM Communications, Inc.	Oldies
WJTN	1240 AM	Jamestown	Media One Holdings, LLC	Full service/news/talk
WJUX	99.7 FM	South Fallsburg	Bridgelight, LLC	Religious
WJVC	96.1 FM	Ronkonkoma	JVC Media LLC, a Florida LLC Company	Country
WJVQ-LP	94.7 FM	Poughkeepsie	New York Catholic Radio, Inc.	Catholic
WJZZ	88.1 FM	Montgomery	Hudson Valley Public Radio, Inc.	Jazz
WKAJ	1120 AM	Saint Johnsville	Cranesville Block Company, Inc.	News/talk
WKAL	1450 AM	Rome	Tune in Broadcasting, LLC	Talk
WKBE	107.1 FM	Corinth	6 Johnson Road Licenses, Inc.	Country
WKBR-LP	102.3 FM	Town of Highlands	Catholic Kolping Society New York	Catholic
WKCR-FM	89.9 FM	New York City	Trustees of Columbia University in New York	College radio
WKDL	104.9 FM	Brockport	Brockport Licenses, LLC	Contemporary Christian (K-Love)
WKDM	1380 AM	New York City	Multicultural Radio Broadcasting Licensee, LLC	Ethnic/Chinese & Spanish
WKEL	88.1 FM	Webster	Educational Media Foundation	Contemporary Christian (K-Love)
WKGB-FM	92.5 FM	Conklin	iHM Licenses, LLC	Active rock
WKGS	106.7 FM	Irondequoit	iHM Licenses, LLC	Rhythmic contemporary
WKHV-LP	103.9 FM	Kingston	Kingston Outreach Services	Christian radio
WKIP	1450 AM	Poughkeepsie	iHM Licenses, LLC	News/talk
WKJY	98.3 FM	Hempstead	Connoisseur Media Licenses, LLC	Adult contemporary
WKKF	102.3 FM	Ballston Spa	iHM Licenses, LLC	Rhythmic contemporary
WKLI-FM	100.9 FM	Albany	6 Johnson Road Licenses, Inc.	Country
WKLL	94.9 FM	Frankfort	Galaxy Utica Licensee LLC	Active rock
WKLZ	105.9 FM	Syracuse	Educational Media Foundation	Contemporary Christian (K-Love)
WKNY	1490 AM	Kingston	Radio Kingston Corp.	Full service AC/talk
WKOL	105.1 FM	Plattsburgh	Hall Communications, Inc.	Classic hits
WKPQ	105.3 FM	Hornell	Southern Belle, LLC	Country
WKRB	90.3 FM	Brooklyn	Kingsborough Community College	CHR/college
WKRH	106.5 FM	Fair Haven	Galaxy Syracuse Licensee LLC	Active rock
WKRL-FM	100.9 FM	North Syracuse	Galaxy Syracuse Licensee LLC	Active rock
WKSE	98.5 FM	Niagara Falls	Audacy License, LLC	Top 40 (CHR)
WKSN	1340 AM	Jamestown	Media One Holdings, LLC	Adult standards
WKTU	103.5 FM	Lake Success	iHM Licenses, LLC	Rhythmic AC-leaning Top 40 (CHR)
WKVJ	89.7 FM	Dannemora	Educational Media Foundation	Contemporary Christian (K-Love)
WKVU	107.3 FM	Utica	Educational Media Foundation	Contemporary Christian (K-Love)
WKWV	90.1 FM	Watertown	Educational Media Foundation	Contemporary Christian (K-Love)
WKWZ	88.5 FM	Syosset	Syosset Central School District	Educational
WKXP	94.3 FM	Kingston	Townsquare License, LLC	Soft adult contemporary
WKXZ	93.9 FM	Norwich	Townsquare License, LLC	Hot adult contemporary
WKZA	106.9 FM	Lakewood	Media One Group II, LLC	Oldies
WLEA	1480 AM	Hornell	PMJ Communications, Inc.	Talk (daytime) & oldies (nights/weekends)
WLFK	95.3 FM	Gouverneur	Community Broadcasters, LLC	Country
WLGR	93.5 FM	Warrensburg	Loud Media LLC	Classic hits
WLGU	90.7 FM	Lancaster	Holy Family Communications Inc	
WLGV	90.9 FM	Gloversville	Educational Media Foundation	Contemporary Christian (K-Love)
WLGZ-FM	102.7 FM	Webster	DRJO Broadcasting LLC	Classic hits
WLHV	88.1 FM	Annandale-on-Hudson	Tri-State Public Communications, Inc.	
WLIB	1190 AM	New York City	WBLS-WLIB License LLC	Urban contemporary gospel
WLID	1370 AM	Patchogue	Cantico Nuevo Ministry, Inc.	Contemporary Christian
WLIM	1440 AM	Medford	JVC Media LLC	Spanish news/talk
WLIR-FM	107.1 FM	Hampton Bays	Red Apple Media, Inc.	Conservative talk
WLIW-FM	88.3 FM	Southampton	WNET	Public radio
WLIX-LP	94.7 FM	Ridge	RCN Ministry Inc.	Classic hits/1980s
WLJH	90.7 FM	Glens Falls	Sound of Life, Inc.	Christian radio
WLJP	89.3 FM	Monroe	Sound of Life, Inc.	Christian radio
WLKW	95.3 FM	Celoron	Educational Media Foundation	Contemporary Christian
WLLG	99.3 FM	Lowville	The Flack Broadcasting Group L.L.C.	Country
WLLW	101.7 FM	Geneva	Upstate Media Group, Inc.	Classic rock
WLNA	1420 AM	Peekskill	6 Johnson Road Licenses, Inc.	Conservative talk
WLNF	90.9 FM	Rapids	Lockport Community Television	Variety
WLNG	92.1 FM	Sag Harbor	Bark Out Loud Dogs Media, LLC	Oldies
WLNL	1000 AM	Horseheads	Trinity Media, Ltd.	Christian radio
WLOF	101.7 FM	Elma	Holy Family Communications	Catholic
WLPP-LP	102.9 FM	Palenville	Maetreum of Cybele, Magna Mater, Inc.	Variety/Pacifica
WLPW	105.5 FM	Lake Placid	North Country Radio, Inc.	Mainstream rock
WLRF-LP	94.3 FM	Binghamton	Latter Rain Network, Inc.	Christian radio
WLRG-LP	107.5 FM	Corning	Corning Christian Radio Corporation	Christian radio
WLSV	790 AM	Wellsville	DBM Communications, Inc.	Country
WLTB	101.7 FM	Johnson City	GM Broadcasting, Inc.	Top 40 (CHR)
WLTW	106.7 FM	New York City	iHM Licenses, LLC	Adult contemporary
WLVL	1340 AM	Lockport	Kenmore Broadcasting Communications, Inc.	News/talk
WLVY	1600 AM	Elmira Hts-Horseheads	Tower Broadcasting LLC	Top 40 (CHR)
WLYK	102.7 FM	Cape Vincent	Border International Broadcasting	Classic hits
WLZW	98.7 FM	Utica	Townsquare Media Licensee of Utica/Rome, Inc.	Adult contemporary
WMAJ	1230 AM	Elmira	Southern Belle, LLC	Adult contemporary
WMBO	1340 AM	Auburn	Wolf Radio, Inc.	Classic hits
WMCA	570 AM	New York City	Salem Media of New York, LLC	Christian radio
WMCR	1600 AM	Oneida	Towercast Media, LLC	Soft adult contemporary
WMFU	90.1 FM	Mount Hope	Auricle Communications	Freeform
WMHH	96.7 FM	Clifton Park	Mars Hill Broadcasting Company, Inc.	Christian radio
WMHI	94.7 FM	Cape Vincent	Mars Hill Broadcasting Co. Inc.	Christian radio
WMHN	89.3 FM	Webster	Mars Hill Broadcasting Co. Inc.	Christian radio
WMHQ	90.1 FM	Malone	Mars Hill Broadcasting Co. Inc.	Christian radio
WMHR	102.9 FM	Syracuse	Mars Hill Broadcasting Co. Inc.	Christian radio
WMHT-FM	89.1 FM	Schenectady	WMHT Educational Telecommunications	Classical
WMHU	91.1 FM	Cold Brook	Mars Hill Broadcasting Co., Inc.	Christian radio
WMHY	88.5 FM	Richfield Springs	Mars Hill Broadcasting Co., Inc.	Christian radio
WMML	1230 AM	Glens Falls	6 Johnson Road Licenses, Inc.	Classic country
WMSA	1340 AM	Massena	Stephens Media Group Massena	Talk/Oldies
WMTQ	88.1 FM	Elmira/Corning	Holy Family Communications	Catholic
WMVN	100.3 FM	Sylvan Beach	Wolf Radio, Inc.	Rhythmic adult contemporary
WMVQ	90.5 FM	Fenner	State University of New York	Variety
WMWA	96.5 FM	Malone	Educational Media Foundation	Christian worship (Air1)
WMXO	101.5 FM	Olean	Southern Belle, LLC	Hot adult contemporary
WMXW	103.3 FM	Vestal	iHM Licenses, LLC	Adult contemporary
WMYY	97.3 FM	Schoharie	Capital Media Corporation	Christian radio
WNAR-LP	100.3 FM	Arcade	Arcade Christian Broadcasting Corporation	Christian radio
WNBF	1290 AM	Binghamton	Townsquare License, LLC	News/talk
WNBL	107.3 FM	South Bristol Township	iHM Licenses, LLC	1980s hits
WNBZ-FM	106.3 FM	Saranac Lake	NBZ, LLC	Classic hits
WNCQ-FM	102.9 FM	Canton	Stephens Media Group Ogdensburg, LLC	Country
WNED-FM	94.5 FM	Buffalo	Western New York Public Broadcasting Association	Classical
WNER	1410 AM	Watertown	Stephens Media Group Watertown	Sports (FSR)
WNEW-FM	102.7 FM	New York City	Audacy License, LLC	Hot adult contemporary
WNGN	91.9 FM	Argyle	Northeast Gospel Broadcasting Inc.	Contemporary Christian
WNGZ	1490 AM	Watkins Glen	Southern Belle, LLC	Classic hits
WNJA	89.7 FM	Jamestown	Western New York Public Broadcasting Association	Classical
WNKI	106.1 FM	Corning	Southern Belle, LLC	Top 40 (CHR)
WNRS	1420 AM	Herkimer	Arjuna Broadcasting Corp.	Tropical
WNTQ	93.1 FM	Syracuse	Radio License Holding CBC, LLC	Top 40 (CHR)
WNVU	93.5 FM	New Rochelle	Hope Media Group	Spanish Christian
WNYC	820 AM	New York City	New York Public Radio	Public radio
WNYC-FM	93.9 FM	New York City	New York Public Radio	Public radio
WNYE	91.5 FM	New York City	NYC Dept. of Information Technology and Telecommunications	Variety, educational
WNYG	1580 AM	Patchogue	Cantico Nuevo Ministry, Inc	Spanish Christian
WNYH	740 AM	Huntington	Win Radio Broadcasting Corporation	Spanish Christian
WNYO	88.9 FM	Oswego	State University of New York	College radio
WNYQ	101.7 FM	Hudson Falls	6 Johnson Road Licenses, Inc.	Classic hits
WNYR-FM	98.5 FM	Waterloo	Lake Country Broadcasting, Inc.	Adult contemporary
WNYU-FM	89.1 FM	New York City	New York University	College radio
WNYY	1470 AM	Ithaca	Saga Communications of New England, LLC	Oldies
WODZ-FM	96.1 FM	Rome	Townsquare Media Licensee of Utica/Rome, Inc.	Classic hits
WOEN	1360 AM	Olean	Sound Communications, LLC	Classic rock
WOFX	980 AM	Troy	iHM Licenses, LLC	Sports (FSR)
WOGM-LP	104.7 FM	Jamestown	Lighthouse Baptist Church	Christian radio
WOKN	99.5 FM	Southport	Tower Broadcasting LLC	Country
WOKR	1310 AM	Canandaigua	1310 FLX Radio, Inc.	Classic country
WOLF	1490 AM	Syracuse	Wolf Radio Inc.	Sports (FSR)
WOLF-FM	92.1 FM	Baldwinsville	FoxFur Communications, LLC	Country
WOLN	91.3 FM	Olean	Western New York Public Broadcasting Association	Public radio
WOLY	1450 AM	Olean	Southern Belle, LLC	Classic hits
WONY	90.9 FM	Oneonta	State University of New York	College radio
WOOA-LP	106.9 FM	Albany	Green Education and Legal Fund, Inc.	Variety
WOOC-LP	105.3 FM	Troy	Media Alliance	Variety
WOOG-LP	92.7 FM	Troy	Oakwood Community Center, Inc.	Variety
WOOS-LP	98.9 FM	Schenectady	Troy Bike Rescue Inc.	Variety
WOPG	1460 AM	Albany	Pax et Bonum, Inc.	Catholic talk/EWTN
WOPG-FM	89.9 FM	Esperance	Pax et Bonum, Inc.	Catholic talk/EWTN
WOR	710 AM	New York City	iHM Licenses, LLC	News/talk
WOSR	91.7 FM	Middletown	WAMC	Public radio
WOSW	1300 AM	Fulton	Foxfur Communications, LLC	Sports (FSR)
WOTT	94.1 FM	Calcium	Community Broadcasters, LLC	Mainstream rock
WOUR	96.9 FM	Utica	Townsquare Media Licensee of Utica/Rome, Inc.	Classic rock
WOXR	90.9 FM	Schuyler Falls	Vermont Public Co.	Classical
WPAC	98.7 FM	Ogdensburg	Stephens Media Group Ogdensburg, LLC	Oldies
WPBZ-FM	103.9 FM	Rensselaer	Townsquare Media of Albany, Inc.	Hot adult contemporary
WPDA	106.1 FM	Jeffersonville	Townsquare License, LLC	Classic rock
WPDH	101.5 FM	Poughkeepsie	Townsquare License, LLC	Classic rock
WPDM	1470 AM	Potsdam	Martz Communications Group Inc.	Country
WPGL	90.7 FM	Pattersonville	Sound of Life, Inc.	Christian radio
WPGO	820 AM	Horseheads	Montrose Broadcasting Corporation	Christian radio
WPHD	98.7 FM	Corning	Southern Belle, LLC	Classic hits
WPIE	1160 AM	Trumansburg	Taughannock Media, LLC	Sports (ESPN)
WPIG	95.7 FM	Olean	Southern Belle, LLC	Country
WPKF	96.1 FM	Poughkeepsie	iHM Licenses, LLC	Rhythmic contemporary
WPLF	103.3 FM	Shelter Island	Educational Media Foundation	Contemporary Christian (K-Love)
WPLJ	95.5 FM	New York City	Educational Media Foundation	Contemporary Christian (K-Love)
WPNR-FM	90.7 FM	Utica	Utica College	Variety
WPOB	88.5 FM	Plainview	Plainview-Old Bethpage School District	High school broadcasting
WPTR	1240 AM	Schenectady	Area Independent Radio, Inc.	Full service classic rock and classic hits
WPTY	105.3 FM	Calverton-Roanoke	JVC Media LLC, a Florida LLC Company	Rhythmic adult contemporary
WPUT	90.1 FM	North Salem	Foothills Public Radio, Inc.	Jazz/community
WPXY-FM	97.9 FM	Rochester	Audacy License, LLC	Top 40 (CHR)
WPYX	106.5 FM	Albany	iHM Licenses, LLC	Classic rock
WQBK-FM	105.7 FM	Malta	Townsqure Media of Albany, Inc.	Classic rock
WQEQ-LP	105.5 FM	Flushing	The Global Service Center for Quitting Chinese Communist Party	Ethnic/Chinese
WQET-LP	107.9 FM	Middletown	Eastern US Taiwan Culture Promotion Association, Inc.	Ethnic
WQHT	97.1 FM	New York City	Mediaco WQHT License LLC	Mainstream urban
WQKA-LP	92.9 FM	Pulteney	Keuka Broadcasters, Inc.	Variety
WQLR	94.7 FM	Chateaugay	Educational Media Foundation	Contemporary Christian
WQNY	103.7 FM	Ithaca	Saga Communications of New England, LLC	Country
WQPJ-LP	94.3 FM	Port Jervis	D S Great Tatang Cultural Inc.	Ethnic
WQPU-LP	93.7 FM	Westbrookville	Pure Heart Culture and Education Foundation	Ethnic
WQRS	98.3 FM	Salamanca	Sound Communications, LLC	Classic rock
WQRW	93.5 FM	Wellsville	Pembrook Pines Mass Media N.A. Corp.	Hot adult contemporary
WQSH	103.5 FM	Cobleskill	Townsquare Media of Albany, Inc.	Classic rock
WQTK	92.7 FM	Ogdensburg	Community Broadcasters, LLC	News/talk
WQXW	90.3 FM	Ossining	New York Public Radio	Classical
WRAQ-LP	92.7 FM	Angelica	Angelica Community Radio Inc	Variety
WRCD	101.5 FM	Canton	Stephens Media Group Massena, LLC	Classic rock
WRCK	1480 AM	Remsen	Phoenix Radio, Inc.	Hip hop (relays: WUSP)
WRCN-FM	103.9 FM	Riverhead	JVC Media LLC, a Florida LLC Company	News/talk
WRCR	1700 AM	Haverstraw	Alexander Broadcasting, Inc.	Adult contemporary
WRCU-FM	90.1 FM	Hamilton	Colgate University	Freeform
WREM	88.7 FM	Canton	The St. Lawrence University	Public radio
WRFA-LP	107.9 FM	Jamestown	Reg Lenna Center for the Arts, Inc.	Variety/Pacifica
WRFI	89.7 FM	Odessa	Ithaca Community Radio, Inc.	Public radio
WRFZ-LP	106.3 FM	Rochester	Rochester Free Radio, Inc.	Variety
WRGR	102.1 FM	Tupper Lake	North Country Radio Corp.	Adult hits
WRHO	89.7 FM	Oneonta	Hartwick College	Album-oriented rock
WRHU	88.7 FM	Hempstead	Hofstra University	Variety
WRHV	88.7 FM	Poughkeepsie	WMHT Educational Telecommunications	Classical
WRIP	97.9 FM	Windham	RIP Radio, LLC	Adult contemporary
WRIV	1390 AM	Riverhead	Crystal Coast Communications, Inc.	Adult standards
WRKL	910 AM	New City	Polnet Communications, Ltd.	Ethnic
WRLI-FM	91.3 FM	Southampton	Connecticut Public Broadcasting, Inc.	Public radio
WRMM-FM	101.3 FM	Rochester	Stephens Media Group – Rochester, LLC	Adult contemporary
WRNQ	92.1 FM	Poughkeepsie	iHM Licenses, LLC	Adult contemporary
WRNY	1350 AM	Rome	Galaxy Utica Licensee LLC	Sports (ESPN)
WROC	950 AM	Rochester	Audacy License, LLC	Sports (ISN)
WROW	590 AM	Albany	6 Johnson Road Licenses, Inc.	Soft oldies
WRPI	91.5 FM	Troy	Rensselaer Polytechnic Institute	College radio
WRPJ	88.9 FM	Port Jervis	Sound of Life, Inc.	Christian radio
WRRB	96.9 FM	Arlington	Townsquare License, LLC	Alternative rock
WRRV	92.7 FM	Middletown	Townsquare License, LLC	Alternative rock
WRSB	1600 AM	Brockport	Genesee Media Corporation	Spanish tropical
WRUC	89.7 FM	Schenectady	Trustees of Union College	Freeform
WRUN	90.3 FM	Remsen	WAMC	Public radio
WRUR-FM	88.5 FM	Rochester	University of Rochester Broadcast Corp.	AAA/NPR News
WRVD	90.3 FM	Syracuse	State University of New York	Public radio
WRVE	99.5 FM	Schenectady	iHM Licenses, LLC	Hot adult contemporary
WRVH	89.3 FM	Clayton	State University of New York	Public radio
WRVJ	91.7 FM	Watertown	State University of New York	Public radio
WRVN	91.9 FM	Utica	State University of New York	Public radio
WRVO	89.9 FM	Oswego	State University of New York	Public radio
WRVP	1310 AM	Mount Kisco	Radio Vision Cristiana Management	Spanish religious
WRWB-FM	99.3 FM	Ellenville	iHM Licenses, LLC	Country
WRWD-FM	107.3 FM	Highland	iHM Licenses, LLC	Country
WSBU	88.3 FM	St. Bonaventure	St. Bonaventure University	Alternative rock, hip-hop, classic rock
WSDE	1190 AM	Cobleskill	Schoharie Broadcasting, LLC	Adult standards
WSEN	103.9 FM	Mexico	Wolf Radio, Inc.	Classic hits
WSFW	1110 AM	Seneca Falls	CSN International	Religious (CSN International)
WSGO	1440 AM	Oswego	Galaxy Syracuse Licensee LLC	Sports (ESPN)
WSHR	91.9 FM	Lake Ronkonkoma	Sachem Central School District Holbrook	Top 40 (CHR)
WSIA	88.9 FM	Staten Island	The College of Staten Island	Modern active rock
WSIV	1540 AM	East Syracuse	Cram Communications LLC	Christian radio
WSKG-FM	89.3 FM	Binghamton	WSKG Public Telecommunications Council	Public radio
WSKO	1260 AM	Syracuse	Radio License Holding CBC, LLC	Sports (ISN)
WSKQ-FM	97.9 FM	New York City	WSKQ Licensing, Inc.	Tropical
WSKS	97.9 FM	Whitesboro	Roser Communications Network	Top 40 (CHR)
WSKU	105.5 FM	Little Falls	Roser Communications Network	Top 40 (CHR)
WSLB	1400 AM	Ogdensburg	Community Broadcasters, LLC	Sports (ESPN)
WSLG	90.5 FM	Gouverneur	The St. Lawrence University	Public radio
WSLJ	88.9 FM	Watertown	The St. Lawrence University	Public radio
WSLL	90.5 FM	Saranac Lake	The St. Lawrence University	Public radio
WSLO	90.9 FM	Malone	The St. Lawrence University	Public radio
WSLP	93.3 FM	Ray Brook	North Country Radio Corp.	Adult hits
WSLU	89.5 FM	Canton	The St. Lawrence University	Public radio
WSLZ	88.1 FM	Cape Vincent	The St. Lawrence University	Public radio
WSNN	99.3 FM	Potsdam	Martz Communications Group Inc.	1980s hits
WSNO-FM	97.9 FM	Au Sable	Great Eastern Radio, LLC	Adult contemporary
WSPJ-LP	103.3 FM	Syracuse	Syracuse Community Radio, Inc.	Public radio
WSPK	104.7 FM	Poughkeepsie	6 Johnson Road Licenses, Inc.	Top 40 (CHR)
WSPN	91.1 FM	Saratoga Springs	Skidmore College	Freeform
WSQA	88.7 FM	Hornell	WSKG Public Telecommunications Council	Public radio
WSQC-FM	91.7 FM	Oneonta	WSKG Public Telecommunications Council	Public radio
WSQE	91.1 FM	Corning	WSKG Public Telecommunications Council	Public radio
WSQG-FM	90.9 FM	Ithaca	WSKG Public Telecommunications Council	Public radio
WSQN	88.1 FM	Greene	WSKG Public Telecommunications Council	Public radio
WSQX-FM	91.5 FM	Binghamton	WSKG Public Telecommunications Council	Public radio
WSRK	103.9 FM	Oneonta	Townsquare License, LLC	Adult contemporary
WSSK	89.7 FM	Saratoga Springs	Sound of Life, Inc.	Christian radio
WSSV	1160 AM	Mechanicville	Loud Media LLC	Classic hits
WSUC-FM	90.5 FM	Cortland	State University of New York at Cortland	Variety
WSUF	89.9 FM	Noyack	Sacred Heart University, Inc.	News/talk/classical
WSUL	98.3 FM	Monticello	Bold Gold Media Group, L.P.	Adult contemporary
WSYR	570 AM	Syracuse	iHM Licenses, LLC	News/talk
WSYR-FM	106.9 FM	Solvay	iHM Licenses, LLC	News/talk
WTBQ	1110 AM	Warwick	Frank R. Truatt	Full service
WTKV	105.5 FM	Minetto	Galaxy Syracuse Licensee LLC	Classic rock
WTKW	99.5 FM	Bridgeport	Galaxy Syracuse Licensee LLC	Classic rock
WTLA	1200 AM	North Syracuse	Galaxy Syracuse Licensee LLC	Sports (ESPN)
WTLB	1310 AM	Utica	Galaxy Utica Licensee LLC	Sports (ESPN)
WTMI	88.7 FM	Fleming	Holy Family Communications	Catholic
WTMM-FM	104.5 FM	Mechanicville	Townsquare Media of Albany, Inc.	Sports (ESPN)
WTNY	790 AM	Watertown	Stephens Media Group Watertown	Talk
WTOJ	103.1 FM	Carthage	Community Broadcasters, LLC	Adult contemporary
WTOR	770 AM	Youngstown	Birach Broadcasting Corporation	Ethnic/South Asian
WTRY-FM	98.3 FM	Rotterdam	iHM Licenses, LLC	Classic hits
WTSC-FM	91.1 FM	Potsdam	Knight & Day Inc.	Full service, "free-format", college
WTSS	96.1 FM	Buffalo	Townsquare Media of Buffalo, Inc.	Adult contemporary
WUBJ	88.1 FM	Jamestown	Western New York Public Broadcasting Association	Public radio
WUFO	1080 AM	Amherst	Visions Multi Media Group – WUFO Radio LLC	Classic hip hop
WUMX	102.5 FM	Rome	Galaxy Utica Licensee LLC	Hot adult contemporary
WUNY	89.5 FM	Utica	Public Broadcasting Council of Central New York	Classical
WUSB	90.1 FM	Stony Brook	State University of New York	Freeform
WUSP	1550 AM	Utica	Phoenix Radio, Inc.	Hip hop
WUSW	1270 AM	Niagara Falls	Radio License Holding CBC, LLC	Classic country
WUTQ-FM	100.7 FM	Utica	Roser Communications Network, Inc.	Talk
WUUA	89.5 FM	Glen Spey	B. Stephen Demchuk Foundation	Ethnic/Ukrainian
WUUF	103.5 FM	Sodus	Waynco Radio	Country
WVBN	103.9 FM	Bronxville	VCY America, Inc.	Christian radio (VCY America)
WVBR-FM	93.5 FM	Ithaca	Cornell Radio Guild, Inc.	Rock (weekdays) & talk/variety (weekends)
WVCR-FM	88.3 FM	Loudonville	Siena College	Variety
WVHC	91.5 FM	Herkimer	Herkimer County Community College	Variety
WVIN-FM	98.3 FM	Bath	Tower Broadcasting, LLC	Adult contemporary
WVKR-FM	91.3 FM	Poughkeepsie	Vassar College	College radio
WVLF	96.1 FM	Norwood	Stephens Media Group Massena	Adult contemporary
WVOR	102.3 FM	Canandaigua	iHM Licenses, LLC	Soft adult contemporary
WVOS	1240 AM	Liberty	Bold Gold Media Group, L.P.	News/talk
WVOS-FM	95.9 FM	Liberty	Bold Gold Media Group, L.P.	Classic hits
WVOX	1460 AM	New Rochelle	Jeff Chang	Silent
WVSL	1240 AM	Saranac Lake	North Country Radio, Inc.	Mainstream rock
WVTK	92.1 FM	Port Henry	Vox AM/FM, LLC	Classic hits
WVTL	1570 AM	Amsterdam	Roser Communications Network, Inc.	Classic country
WVVC-FM	88.1 FM	Dolgeville	Northeast Gospel Broadcasting Inc.	
WWES	88.9 FM	Albany	WAMC	Public radio
WWFK	107.1 FM	Dannemora	Great Eastern Radio, LLC	Classic rock
WWHT	107.9 FM	Syracuse	iHM Licenses, LLC	Rhythmic contemporary
WWKB	1520 AM	Buffalo	Audacy License, LLC	Sports gambling
WWLE	1170 AM	Cornwall	WWLE Radio LLC	Hispanic
WWPR-FM	105.1 FM	New York City	iHM Licenses, LLC	Urban contemporary
WWRL	1600 AM	New York City	iHM Licenses, LLC	Black-oriented news
WWRV	1330 AM	New York City	Radio Vision Cristiana Management Corp.	Spanish Christian music & teaching
WWSC	1450 AM	Glens Falls	Regional Radio Group, LLC	Classic rock
WWSE	93.3 FM	Jamestown	Media One Holdings, LLC	Top 40 (CHR)/Hot AC
WWSK	94.3 FM	Smithtown	Connoisseur Media Licenses, LLC	Mainstream rock
WWTJ-LP	96.9 FM	Watertown	Calvary Chapel North Country	Religious teaching
WWWF-FM	103.1 FM	Bay Shore	Connoisseur Media Licenses, LLC	Country
WWWS	1400 AM	Buffalo	Audacy License, LLC	Urban oldies
WWYL	104.1 FM	Chenango Bridge	Townsquare License, LLC	Top 40 (CHR)
WXBA	88.1 FM	Brentwood	Brentwood Union Free School District	Educational
WXHC	101.5 FM	Homer	Eves Broadcasting, Inc.	Oldies
WXIR-LP	100.9 FM	Rochester	Rochester Community TV, Inc.	Variety
WXLJ	94.1 FM	Whitehall	The St. Lawrence University	Public radio
WXLB	91.7 FM	Boonville	The St. Lawrence University	Public radio
WXLD	89.7 FM	Lowville	The St. Lawrence University	Public radio
WXLE	105.9 FM	Indian Lake	The St. Lawrence University	Public radio
WXLG	89.9 FM	North Creek	The St. Lawrence University	Public radio
WXLH	91.3 FM	Blue Mountain Lake	The St. Lawrence University	Public radio
WXLL	91.7 FM	Lake Placid	The St. Lawrence University	Public radio
WXLS	88.3 FM	Tupper Lake	The St. Lawrence University	Public radio
WXLU	88.1 FM	Peru	The St. Lawrence University	Public radio
WXNY-FM	96.3 FM	New York City	Univision Radio Stations Group, Inc.	Tropical Top 40
WXPK	107.1 FM	Briarcliff Manor	6 Johnson Road Licenses, Inc.	Adult album alternative
WXRL	1300 AM	Lancaster	Dome Broadcasting, Inc.	Country
WXUR	92.7 FM	Herkimer	Arjuna Broadcasting Corporation	Classic rock
WXXI	1370 AM	Rochester	WXXI Public Broadcasting Council	Public radio
WXXI-FM	105.9 FM	Rochester	WXXI Public Broadcasting Council	Public radio
WXXO	91.5 FM	Rochester	WXXI Public Broadcasting Council	Classical
WXXY	90.3 FM	Houghton	WXXI Public Broadcasting Council	Classical
WXZO	96.7 FM	Willsboro	Vox AM/FM, LLC	Soft oldies
WYAI	93.7 FM	Scotia	Educational Media Foundation	Christian worship (Air1)
WYBY	920 AM	Cortland	Bible Broadcasting Network, Inc.	Conservative religious (Bible Broadcasting Network)
WYJB	95.5 FM	Albany	6 Johnson Road Licenses, Inc.	Adult contemporary
WYKV	94.5 FM	Ravena	Educational Media Foundation	Contemporary Christian (K-Love)
WYLF	850 AM	Penn Yan	WYLF Radio LLC	Soft adult contemporary
WYMK	106.3 FM	Mount Kisco	Family Stations, Inc.	
WYRK	106.5 FM	Buffalo	Townsquare Media of Buffalo, Inc.	Country
WYRR	88.9 FM	Lakewood	Family Worship Center Church, Inc.	Religious
WYSL	1040 AM	Avon	Radio Livingston, Ltd.	News/talk
WYSX	96.7 FM	Morristown	Stephens Media Group Ogdensburg, LLC	Top 40 (CHR)
WYVS	96.5 FM	Speculator	Cranesville Block Company	Adult contemporary
WYXL	97.3 FM	Ithaca	Saga Communications of New England, LLC	Adult contemporary
WYYY	94.5 FM	Syracuse	iHM Licenses, LLC	Adult contemporary
WZAD	97.3 FM	Wurtsboro	Townsquare License, LLC	Country
WZCR	93.5 FM	Hudson	iHM Licenses, LLC	Oldies
WZDV	92.1 FM	Amherst	Calvary Chapel of the Niagara Frontier	Contemporary Christian
WZHD	97.1 FM	Canaseraga	Southern Belle, LLC	Classic rock
WZNE	94.1 FM	Brighton	Stephens Media Group – Rochester, LLC	Alternative rock
WZNY-LP	98.3 FM	Fairport	Grace Bible Fellowship, Incorporated	Contemporary Christian
WZOZ	103.1 FM	Oneonta	Townsquare License, LLC	Classic hits
WZRC	1480 AM	New York City	Multicultural Radio Broadcasting Licensee, LLC	Ethnic/Chinese
WZUN	1070 AM	Sandy Creek-Pulaski	Galaxy Syracuse Licensee LLC	Classic hits
WZUN-FM	102.1 FM	Phoenix	Galaxy Syracuse Licensee LLC	Classic hits
WZXV	99.7 FM	Palmyra	Calvary Chapel of the Finger Lakes, Inc.	Christian radio

== Defunct ==
- Jukebox Radio
- W8XH
- WAIH
- WBVG
- WCBA
- WCEB
- WCHN
- WDCD
- WDOS
- WDT
- WETD
- WFAS
- WGLI
- WGYN
- WIRD
- WJY
- WMGM-FM
- WNYK
- WOSS
- WQKE
- WSPQ
- WVBN
- WXKW (Albany, New York)
- WXKW (Watervliet, New York)
- WYBG
- WYOS

== Bibliography ==
- Alicoate, Jack, ed. (1939), "Standard Broadcasting Stations of the United States: New York", Radio Annual, New York: Radio Daily, OCLC 2459636
