= New York Giants Radio Network =

Official radio network of the NFL's New York Giants

The New York Giants Radio Network is a broadcast radio network based in New York City, the official radio broadcaster of the National Football League's New York Giants. The network's radio broadcasts are currently flagshipped at WFAN, a station owned by Audacy. Overflow radio casts air on WFAN-FM, WFAN's corporate sibling.

The network distributes Giants home and away games to a network of 18 stations in three states. Bob Papa is the current play-by-play announcer, with former Giants linebacker Carl Banks as color analyst, and former Giants tight end Howard Cross as sideline reporter.

== Stations ==
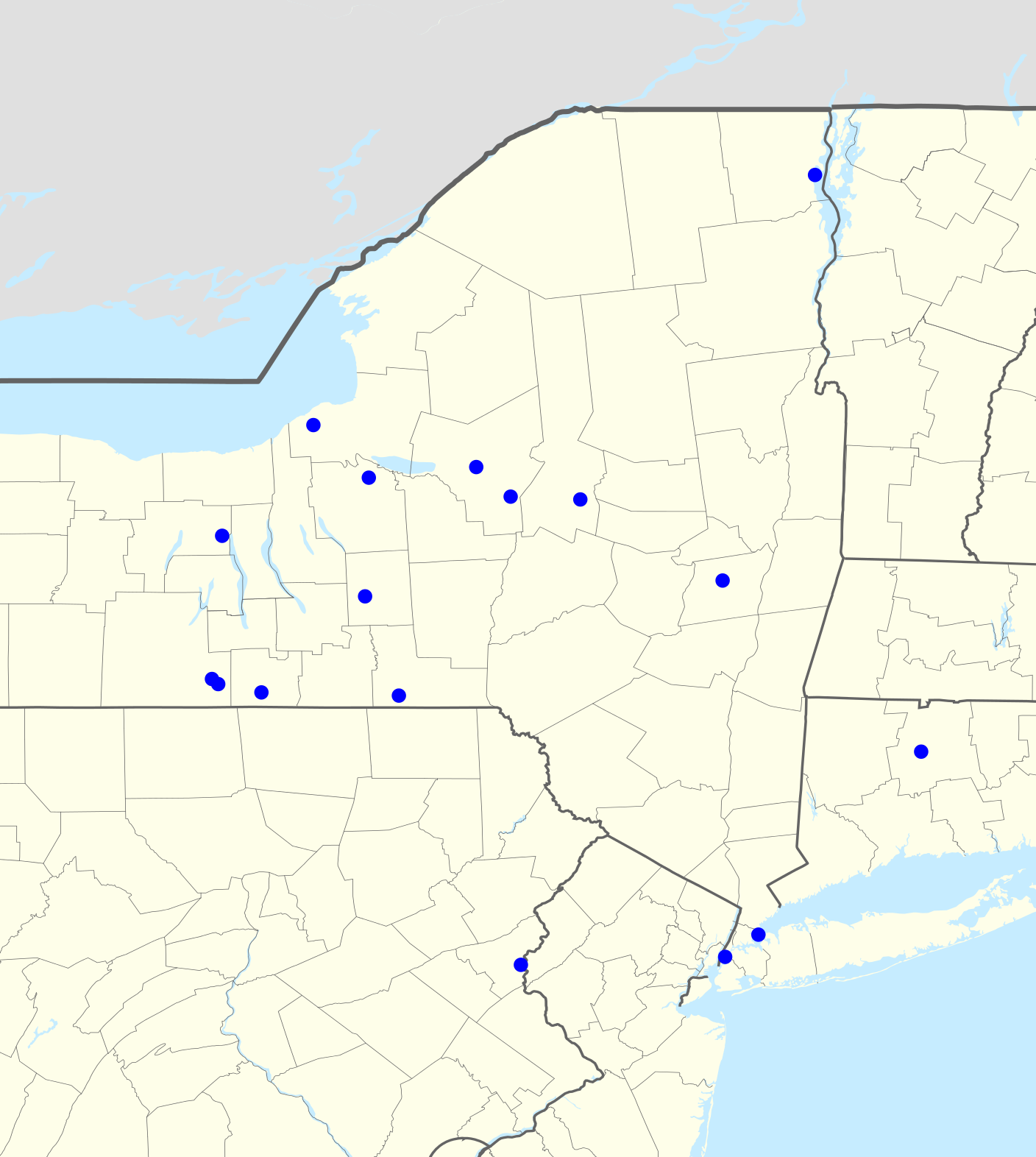
Map of New York Giants Radio Network affiliates

=== Flagship (2 stations) ===
- WFAN/660: New York City
- WFAN-FM/101.9: New York City

=== Affiliates (13 stations + 2 translators) ===
==== New York (11 stations + 2 translators) ====
- WPYX/106.5: Albany
- WAAL/99.1: Binghamton
- WENI/1450: Corning
- WPHD/98.7: Corning
- WMAJ/1230: Elmira
- WIXT/1230: Little Falls
- W249BC/97.1: Mattydale (rebroadcasts WTLA at North Syracuse)
- WTLA/1200: North Syracuse
- WSGO/1440: Oswego
- W261AC/100.1: Oswego (rebroadcasts WSGO)
- WIRY/1340: Plattsburgh (Burlington, Vermont market) AM Stereo
- WRNY/1350: Rome
- WTLB/1310: Utica (Syracuse market)

==== Pennsylvania (1 station) ====
- WEEX/1230: Easton, Pennsylvania

==== Connecticut (1 station) ====
- WPOP/1410: Hartford

=== Former affiliates (45 stations) ===
- WLAD/800: Danbury
- WSUB/980: Groton
- WTIC/1080: Hartford
- WNHC/1340: New Haven
- WPLR/99.1: New Haven
- WWCO/1240: Waterbury
- WZON/620: Bangor
- WBZ/1030: Boston
- WNAC/680: Boston
- WNNZ/640: Westfield
- WVEI/1440: Worcester
- WNNJ/1360: Newton
- WABY/1400: Albany
- WROW/590: Albany (1983-1992 seasons), (1995-2000 seasons)
- WCGR/1550: Canandaigua, New York (2012-13 season)
- WFLR/1570: Dundee, New York (2012-13 season)
- WENE/1430: Endicott
- WBZA/1230: Glens Falls (1993-1995 seasons)
- WRQI/95.1: Honeoye Falls
- WSRD/104.9: Johnstown (1991-1997 seasons)
- WKNY/1490: Kingston
- WALL/1340: Middletown
- WOR/710: New York City (1936-1937 seasons), (1939 season), (1993-1995 seasons)
- WCBS/880: New York City (1939 season), (1958-1960 seasons)
- WINS/1010: New York City (1934-1935 seasons), (1956-1957 seasons)
- WMGM/1050: New York City (1939-1955 seasons)
- WNEW/1130: New York City (1961-1992 seasons)
- WEOK/1390: Poughkeepsie
- WADR/1480: Remsen
- WQBK/1300: Rensselaer (1993-1994 seasons)
- WCMF/990: Rochester
- WGY/810: Schenectady
- WNNR/103.5: Sodus
- WBAZ/101.7: Southold
- WSYR/570: Syracuse
- WOFX/980: Troy (2001 season)
- WUTQ/1550: Utica
- WTKZ/1320: Allentown
- WICK/1400: Scranton
- WPNW/550: Pawtucket
- WPRO/630: Providence
- WVMT/620: Burlington
- WDEV/550: Waterbury
- WDEV-FM/96.1: Warren
- WLEZ-LP/100.1 (now 98.1): Jackson, Mississippi (2009-10 season)

== Broadcasters ==
=== 2010s ===
Year	Flagship station	Play-by-play	Color commentator(s)	Sideline reporter	Studio host	Studio analyst
2011	WFAN	Bob Papa	Carl Banks	Howard Cross		

=== 2000s ===
Year	Flagship station	Play-by-play	Color commentator(s)	Sideline reporter	Studio host	Studio analyst
2007	WFAN	Bob Papa	Carl Banks and Dick Lynch	Howard Cross		

=== 1990s ===
Year	Flagship station	Play-by-play	Color commentator(s)	Sideline reporter	Studio host	Studio analyst
1990	WNEW	Jim Gordon	Dick Lynch and Karl Nelson		Bob Papa	

=== 1980s ===
Year	Flagship station	Play-by-play	Color commentator(s)	Sideline reporter	Studio host	Studio analyst
1986	WNEW	Jim Gordon	Dick Lynch		John Kennelly	Tom Tracy
