= Brian Higgins (sportscaster) =

American sportscaster (born 1982)

- Born: February 6, 1982 (age 44)
- Education: Syracuse University
- Sports commentary career
- Genres: Radio personality, sports commentator

Brian Higgins is an American radio personality and play-by-play commentator.

Higgins has been a play-by-play broadcaster and host for the Syracuse Sports Network, ACC Network, and Time Warner Sports. From 2019 to 2025, he worked for Galaxy Media and hosted The 315 in drive time for ESPN Syracuse.

== Early life and education ==
Higgins graduated from the S. I. Newhouse School of Public Communications of Syracuse University in 2004 with a degree in broadcast journalism. He was a member of WAER-FM, and broadcast Orangemen football, men's basketball, and men's lacrosse games. He also called Syracuse SkyChiefs games, anchored sportscasts, and produced feature stories.

Higgins interned for WTEN in Albany and WTVH in Syracuse. He served as the play-by-play broadcaster for the Tri-City ValleyCats from 2002 until 2004.

== Career ==
After graduation, Higgins joined the Syracuse University athletic department and the Syracuse Sports Network as a play-by-play broadcaster and host.

From 2004 until 2022, Higgins was the radio play-by-play broadcaster for the Syracuse men's lacrosse and women's basketball teams. He was on the call for the men's lacrosse team's thrilling comeback win over Cornell in the 2009 NCAA tournament final.

Starting in 2006, he worked as the sideline reporter and host of the pregame, halftime, and postgame shows for football games. When necessary, he filled in for Matt Park on play-by-play for football and men's basketball games.

From 2011 until 2018, he hosted the "Syracuse in 60" football recap show and called high school and college sports games for Time Warner Sports, which later became Spectrum. Higgins went on to call Syracuse basketball, lacrosse, and soccer games for ACC Network Extra until 2022.

Higgins also taught broadcasting as an adjunct professor at the Newhouse School and Sportscaster U.

In 2019, Higgins joined Galaxy Media as a radio host for ESPN Syracuse. He began as a host of Higgins & Sacco with NewsChannel9 sports anchor Mario Sacco. He later hosted The 315 from 4-6 p.m. by himself. The show was also simulcast on ESPN Radio Utica-Rome. On July 8, 2025, Higgins announced on X that he had been laid off by Galaxy Media.
