= WMCR =

WMCR can refer to:

- WMCR (AM), a radio station (1600 AM) licensed to Oneida, New York, United States
- WMCR, an online, student-run radio station at Montgomery College in Rockville, Maryland
- WCIT-FM, a radio station (106.3 FM) licensed to Oneida, New York, which held the call sign WMCR-FM from 1972 until 2016
