= WXKW =

WXKW may refer to:

- WXKW (FM), a radio station (104.9 FM) licensed to Key West, Florida
- WENJ, a radio station (97.3 FM), licensed to Millville, New Jersey, which held the call sign WXKW from 2006 to 2009
- WVSQ, a radio station (106.9 FM), licensed to Renovo, Pennsylvania, which held the call sign WXKW from 1995 to 1997
- WSAN, a radio station (1470 AM), licensed to Allentown, Pennsylvania, which held the WXKW calls from 1985 to 1995
- WAEB-FM, a radio station (104.1 FM), licensed to Allentown, Pennsylvania, which held the WXKW calls the 1970 to 1985
- WXKW (Albany, New York), defunct Albany, New York radio station
- WXKW (Watervliet, New York), defunct Watervliet, New York radio station
