= WZUN =

WZUN may refer to:

- WZUN (AM), a radio station (1070 AM) licensed to serve Sandy Creek-Pulaski, New York, United States
- WZUN-FM, a radio station (102.1 FM) licensed to serve Phoenix, New York
