= WBRV =

WBRV may refer to:

- WBRV (AM), a radio station (900 AM) licensed to Boonville, New York, United States
- WBRV-FM, a radio station (101.3 FM) licensed to Boonville, New York, United States
