= 1200 AM =

AM radio frequency

The following radio stations broadcast on AM frequency 1200 kHz: 1200 AM is classified by the Federal Communications Commission as a United States clear-channel frequency. WOAI San Antonio is the dominant Class A station.

== In Argentina ==
- LRF203 in Esquel, Chubut
- LT6 in Goya, Corrientes

== In Canada ==
| Call sign | City of license | Daytime power (kW) | Nighttime power (kW) | Transmitter coordinates |
|---|---|---|---|---|
| CFGO | Ottawa, Ontario | 50 | 50 | 45.2167°N 75.7697°W |
| CJRJ | Vancouver, British Columbia | 25 | 25 | 49.183767°N 123.062333°W |

== In Mexico ==
- XEPAS-AM in Punta Abreojos, Baja California Sur
- XECPAC-AM in Jalpan de Serra, Querétaro

== In the United States ==
Stations in bold are clear-channel stations.

| Call sign | City of license | Facility ID | Class | Daytime power (kW) | Nighttime power (kW) | Unlimited power (kW) | Transmitter coordinates |
|---|---|---|---|---|---|---|---|
| KFNW | West Fargo, North Dakota | 49792 | B | 50 | 13 | | 46.801667°N 96.883056°W |
| KYAA | Soquel, California | 60852 | B | 25 | 10 | | 36.660556°N 121.541389°W |
| KYOO | Bolivar, Missouri | 36016 | D | 1 | | | 37.621111°N 93.401667°W |
| WBCE | Wickliffe, Kentucky | 71209 | D | 1 | | | 36.981667°N 89.0775°W |
| WFCN | Nashville, Tennessee | 72879 | D | 2 | | | 36.208333°N 86.8725°W |
| WGDL | Lares, Puerto Rico | 36564 | D | 0.25 | | | 18.295°N 66.896944°W |
| WKST | New Castle, Pennsylvania | 71246 | B | 5 | 1 | | 40.939444°N 80.393889°W |
| WMIR | Atlantic Beach, South Carolina | 41499 | D | 6.5 | 0.011 | | 33.836667°N 78.784167°W |
| WMUZ | Taylor, Michigan | 4598 | B | 50 | 15 | | 42.156667°N 83.332222°W |
| WNRJ | Huntington, West Virginia | 61277 | D | 5 | 0.009 | | 38.404722°N 82.489167°W |
| **WOAI** | San Antonio, Texas | 11952 | A | | | 50 | 29.501944°N 98.128611°W |
| WRKK | Hughesville, Pennsylvania | 49265 | B | 10 | 0.25 | | 41.211944°N 76.748611°W |
| WRTO | Chicago, Illinois | 11196 | B | 20 | 4.5 | | 41.661944°N 87.63°W |
| WSML | Graham, North Carolina | 740 | B | 10 | 1 | | 36.133611°N 79.470556°W |
| WTLA | North Syracuse, New York | 54546 | B | 1 | 1 | | 43.151667°N 76.132778°W |
| WXIT | Blowing Rock, North Carolina | 64274 | D | 4.2 | | | 36.216389°N 81.701667°W |
| WXKS | Newton, Massachusetts | 20441 | B | 50 | 50 | | 42.288889°N 71.189167°W |
