= WZUN (AM) =

Simulcasting WZUN-FM Phoenix, NY
- Sandy Creek-Pulaski, New York; United States
- Broadcast area: Oswego & Syracuse, New York
- Frequency: 1070 kHz
- Branding: Sunny 102

Programming
- Format: Classic hits

Ownership
- Owner: Galaxy Media Partners; (Galaxy Syracuse Licensee LLC (New))
- Sister stations: WKRL-FM, WKRH, WSGO, WTKV, WTKW, WTLA, WZUN-FM

History
- First air date: August 8, 1974 (as WSCP)
- Former call signs: WSCP (1974–2018)
- Call sign meaning: Sunny 102 (from sister station WZUN-FM)

Technical information
- Licensing authority: FCC
- Facility ID: 1046
- Class: D
- Power: 2,500 watts days only
- Transmitter coordinates: 43°36′19″N 76°7′48″W
- Translator: 106.1 W291BU (Fulton)

Links
- Public license information: Public file; LMS
- Webcast: Listen live
- Website: sunnysyracuse.com

WZUN (1070 AM) is a radio station airing a classic hits format, twin-licensed to both Sandy Creek and Pulaski, New York, and effectively serving the Syracuse market to the south. The station is owned by Galaxy Media Partners, and is part of a simulcast with 102.1 WZUN-FM.

By day, WZUN is powered at 2,500 watts non-directional. It is a daytime-only station, but uses an FM translator station broadcasting around the clock. W291BU at 106.1 MHz is licensed to Fulton, though this translator mainly covers Oswego.

== History ==
Logo as an ESPN Deportes affiliate

The station signed on August 8, 1974 as WSCP, a country music radio station owned by Oswego Jefferson Broadcasting. Wheat Hill Broadcasting bought the station in 1986. In January 1987, Wheat Hill signed on WSCP-FM (101.7) as a simulcast of the AM station.

WSCP went into bankruptcy in 1992; in 1994, the stations went silent. At the time of the shutdown, the AM station programmed a gospel music format, with country music continuing on WSCP-FM. Tri-County Broadcasting bought WSCP and WSCP-FM out of bankruptcy in 1995, and soon returned WSCP-FM to the air with country music; in August 1996, the AM station returned to the air as a simulcast of WSCP-FM. By June 2000, the stations had shifted to classic country.

Galaxy Communications purchased the WSCP stations in 2001. In May 2003, Galaxy began simulcasting WSCP-FM on translator station W267AL (101.3), bringing the station's programming to Syracuse. WSCP-FM was sold to the Educational Media Foundation in 2007 and is now WGKV, part of the K-LOVE network. Galaxy retained WSCP, and switched it to a simulcast of classic rock station WTKW. On March 5, 2010, WSCP switched to ESPN Deportes Radio, coinciding with sister stations WTLA and WSGO switching to ESPN Radio. On June 6, 2018, the station changed its call sign to WZUN, sharing a call sign with its sister station on 102.1 MHz. ESPN Deportes Radio ceased operations in September 2019, and the station became part of a simulcast with WZUN-FM.

== Translator ==
Broadcast translator for WZUN
Call sign	Frequency	City of license	FID	ERP (W)	Class	Transmitter coordinates	FCC info
W291BU	106.1 FM	Fulton, Oswego County, New York	143125	250	D	43°24′56″N 76°27′54″W	LMS
