= WIXT =

WIXT may refer to:

- WIXT (AM), a radio station (1230 AM) licensed to serve Little Falls, New York, United States
- WMJQ-CD, a low-power television station (channel 27, virtual 40) licensed to serve Syracuse, New York, which held the call sign WIXT-CA from 2005 to 2013 and WIXT-CD from 2013 to 2021
- WIXT-TV, formerly television station WSYR-TV
