= WTLB =

Radio station in Utica, New York

WTLB and WRNY
WTLB: Utica, New York; WRNY: Rome, New York; United States
- Broadcast area: Utica-Rome area
- Frequencies: WTLB: 1310 kHz; WRNY: 1350 kHz
- Branding: ESPN Radio Utica-Rome

Programming
- Format: Sports
- Affiliations: ESPN Radio; Westwood One; New York Giants Radio Network

Ownership
- Owner: Galaxy Media Partners; (Galaxy Utica Licensee LLC)
- Sister stations: WIXT; WKLL; WUMX

History
- First air date: WTLB: January 15, 1947; WRNY: October 12, 1959
- Former call signs: WTLB: WGAT (1946–1957)
- Call sign meaning: WTLB: Former general manager Thomas L. Brown; WRNY: Rome, New York

Technical information
- Licensing authority: FCC
- Facility ID: WTLB: 54548; WRNY: 53657
- Class: WTLB: B; WRNY: D
- Power: WTLB: 5,000 watts (day); 500 watts (night); WRNY: 500 watts day; 57 watts (night)
- Transmitter coordinates: WTLB: 43°3′24″N 75°16′42″W; WRNY: 43°12′18″N 75°29′8″W
- Translator(s): WRNY: 96.5 W243DY (Rome)

Links
- Public license information: WTLB: Public file; LMS; WRNY: Public file; LMS
- Webcast: Listen live
- Website: espnur.com

WTLB (1310 kHz) is an American AM radio station in Utica, New York. Until going silent in 2025, the station broadcast a sports radio format affiliated with ESPN Radio, which conntinues to air in Rome, New York, on simulcast station WRNY (1350 AM) and translator station W243DY (96.5 FM). All three stations are owned by Galaxy Media Partners.

== History ==
=== WTLB ===
WTLB went on the air January 15, 1947, as WGAT, a daytime-only station affiliated with ABC and operating at 1100 kHz. The station was owned by Central Broadcasting Company, a partnership of H. Ross Perkins and J. Eric Williams; the two also owned WNOC in Norwich, Connecticut. After several months, the partnership was dissolved, with Williams becoming the sole owner of WGAT and Perkins taking full control of WNOC. WGAT moved to 1310 in 1949.

Central Broadcasting sold WGAT to Star Broadcasting, owner of WBBF in Rochester and WGVA in Geneva, for $85,000 in 1956. The station, which had gone independent, rejoined ABC under Star ownership. It also changed the call sign to WTLB on March 4, 1957, for then-general manager Thomas L. Brown.

Star Broadcasting sold WTLB and WGVA to R. Peter Straus's Straus Broadcasting Group, owner of WMCA in New York City and WALL in Middletown, for $500,000. Straus was at the time seeking to assemble a statewide group of radio stations. In 1971, Straus sold WTLB to the station's management, led by Paul A. Dunn, for $400,000, as part of a selloff of all of the company's stations except for WMCA.

After a $1.5 million sale to Vanguard Communications in 1987 fell through, WTLB and FM sister station WRCK were sold to Joel Hailstone and Barry Dickstein's H&D Broadcast Group for $1.75 million in 1988; by this point, WTLB was a talk and adult contemporary station. In November 1991, the station began simulcasting on WFRG (1450 AM) in Rome, renamed WZLB, under a local marketing agreement (LMA); the stations initially shared an adult standards format from Unistar, replacing oldies on WTLB, but by February 1992 they were carrying Satellite Music Network's Kool Gold oldies programming. The LMA ended on April 1, 1993, with WZLB returning to its previous WFRG identity.

H&D Media sold WTLB and WRCK to The Radio Corporation (forerunner of Galaxy Media Partners) for $1 million in 1994. In January 1995, the station began simulcasting an adult standards format with WTLA in North Syracuse. WTLB and WTLA, along with WSGO in Oswego, were affiliated the Music of Your Life network; the format would remain on WTLB until 2007.

=== WRNY ===
WRNY signed on October 12, 1959. It was owned by Clear Channel Communications until September 2007, when ownership was transferred to Galaxy Communications as a result of Clear Channel's decision to "go private". The station had been acquired by Clear Channel from Dame Media in June 1999.

=== Sports network ===
Before their transfer of ownership to Galaxy, WRNY and WIXT in Little Falls (which, from its sign-on in 1952 to 2005, was known by the call sign WLFH) operated as part of a four station network of sports talk radio stations identified as "The Sports Stars", along with WADR in Remsen and WUTQ in Utica. The stations carried a variety of local and syndicated sports talk programming, along with live coverage of local sporting events. The Sports Stars network also carried an affiliation with Fox Sports Radio, as was the standard for Clear Channel sports radio stations.

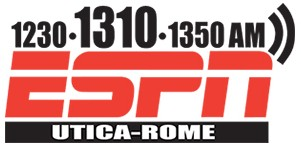
Former Logo with WIXT - which now has separate format

Upon Clear Channel's exit from the Utica market in September 2007, the network was rearranged. WADR and WUTQ, the two weakest stations in the network, were sold to Ken Roser and became full service outlets, while Galaxy Communications acquired WRNY and WIXT, which retained their sports format. Galaxy then paired the stations with WTLB, which ended its adult standards format to simulcast with WRNY and WIXT. The stations retained their Fox Sports Radio affiliation, but changed their identification from "Sports Stars" to "1310 The Game", with WTLB being promoted as the main station. In 2010, Galaxy reached an affiliation deal with ESPN Radio, in which their Utica and Syracuse AM stations would join the network. The deal took effect on March 5, and WTLB/WIXT/WRNY promptly dropped Fox Sports to join ESPN. WTLA and WSGO also ended their Music of Your Life affiliation at that time to join ESPN.

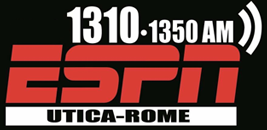
Former Logo before translator sign on

Since WTLB and WRNY have to lower power at night to avoid interference with other stations, Galaxy sought an FM translator to serve the city at night. In 2012, they acquired translator W256AJ at 99.1 FM from the Christian Broadcasting System, owners of WJIV, moved the translator from Hotel Utica to the top of Smith Hill, and boosted its power. The new signal began simulcasting WTLB's programs on September 13, 2012. On September 8, 2016, W256AJ broke from its WTLB simulcast to become variety hits-formatted "Tony FM", which also simulcasts on the HD2 subchannel of sister station WKLL. WIXT followed suit on March 23, 2018. On November 15, 2018, WTLB and WRNY's programming was restored to the FM dial when Galaxy signed on translator W243DY at 96.5.

In 2016 Galaxy moved their Utica studios (WKLL, WOUR, WUMX, WTLB, WRNY and WIXT) from Washington Mills to Downtown Utica inside the new Landmarc Building (the old HSBC Location) and renamed it Galaxy Media. Inside their new location the walls on the side of the street for each studio are made entirely of glass, allowing people to see DJ's at work similar to the Good Morning America studios (Galaxy has long used a similar layout for their studio in Syracuse).

WTLB went silent in December 2025, as its transmitter site land was sold; the station's four towers were demolished in January 2026. WRNY was not affected and continues to air "ESPN Radio Utica-Rome" programming.

== Translator ==
Broadcast translator for WRNY
Call sign	Frequency	City of license	FID	ERP (W)	Class	FCC info
W243DY	96.5 FM	Rome, New York	201219	83	D	LMS
