= WCIT =

WCIT may refer to:

- Worshipful Company of Information Technologists
- World Information Technology and Services Alliance
- World Conference on International Telecommunications
- WCIT (AM), an AM radio station (940 AM) located in Lima, Ohio also an FM radio station in Lima, Ohio (98.5 FM)
- WCIT-FM, a radio station (106.3 FM) licensed to serve Oneida, New York, United States
- WCDV-FM, a radio station (90.1 FM) licensed to serve Trout Run, Pennsylvania, United States, which held the call sign WCIT or WCIT-FM from 2001 to 2016
