= WNSS =

WNSS may refer to:

- WNSS (FM) (89.3 FM), a radio station in Palm Coast, Florida
- WSKO (AM) (1260 AM), a radio station in Syracuse, New York, which held the call sign WNSS from 1996 to 2010
- WTLA (1200 AM), a radio station in North Syracuse, New York, which held the call sign WNSS from 1991 to 1993
