= WUMX =

- Rome, New York; United States
- Broadcast area: Utica, New York
- Frequency: 102.5 MHz
- Branding: Mix 102.5

Programming
- Format: Hot adult contemporary
- Affiliations: Premiere Networks

Ownership
- Owner: Galaxy Media Partners; (Galaxy Utica Licensee LLC)
- Sister stations: WKLL, WIXT, WRNY, WTLB

History
- First air date: 1982 (as WUUU-FM)
- Former call signs: WUUU-FM (1982–1993); WKDY (1993–1995); WSKS (1995–2001); WRBY (2001–2004)
- Call sign meaning: "Utica Mix"

Technical information
- Licensing authority: FCC
- Facility ID: 53656
- Class: B
- ERP: 27,000 watts
- HAAT: 198 meters (650 ft)
- Transmitter coordinates: 43°2′14″N 75°26′40″W
- Translator: 102.7 W274AT (Little Falls)

Links
- Public license information: Public file; LMS
- Webcast: Listen live
- Website: www.mix1025.com

WUMX (102.5 FM) is a radio station broadcasting a hot adult contemporary format. Licensed to Rome, New York, United States, the station serves the Utica–Rome metropolitan area. The station is owned by Galaxy Utica Licensee LLC, the Utica division of Galaxy Media Partners.

== History ==
=== WUUU ===
The station signed on in 1982 as WUUU, an adult contemporary station identified as "U-102" under the ownership of Norma Eilenberg. In 1989, WUUU changed to an oldies format, and Norma Eilenberg renamed the station "Oldies 102". The callsign was retained until a frequency swap with WKDY (93.5 FM) in 1993.

=== WKDY ===
As WKDY, 102.5 operated under a country music format as "Hot Country KDY 102.5". Aimed at rival WFRG-FM which had also gone through a frequency swap, "KDY country" could not dislodge WFRG and often ended up last place in the Utica-Rome market. In August 1994, Norma Eilenberg hired program director Wally "Wilcox" McCarthy who changed WKDY's format to contemporary hit radio (CHR). Now branded as "Kiss 102", WKDY was the first top 40 station in the Utica-Rome market since WRCK where Wilcox was before its sale and changed from CHR to classic rock. The new station shot from last to top 5 across all demos in less than one year. The on-air staff during the station's rise in the market consisted of Wally and Jess in the morning (Wally "Wilcox" McCarthy and Jess Woollard), Dianne Chase in Midday, Shannon Steele Afternoon Drive, Steve "Roadrunner" Lawrence at night and Estelle in the overnight.

=== WSKS ===
In December 1995, Kiss 102 changed its calls to WSKS. In the fall of the following year Kiss 102 was rebranded as 102.5 Kiss FM. In 1997, Norma Eilenberg sold WSKS to Dame Media, who retained the top 40 format.

Dame Media sold the station to Clear Channel Communications (now iHeartMedia) in 1999. One year later, Clear Channel bought rival WOW-FM (WOWZ/WOWB) and moved the Kiss-FM branding to WOWZ/WOWB. WOWZ, at 97.9 FM, took over the WSKS call letters and WOWB was renamed WSKU. The station played various formats before beginning its second stint as a country music station.

=== WRBY ===
In 2001, 102.5 changed calls to WRBY and started branding as "Bob 102.5". Under the country music format for the second time, Bob 102.5 played country music marathons known as 20 Song Bob-A-Thons, causing dominant rival WFRG-FM, who branded as Big Frog 104, to ditch its longtime 10 Songs In A Row imaging. Bob 102.5 was best known for their slogan, "Turn Your Knob To Bob". WRBY had modest ratings, but despite their imaging and slogan could not overtake WFRG-FM. At the beginning of 2004, Clear Channel stunted with the "Wheel Of Formats". On January 12, 2004, the "wheel" landed on hot AC and WRBY flipped to the current "Mix 102.5". The new Mix 102.5 played music from the 1980s and 1990s, as well as contemporary hits.

=== WUMX ===
Logo used from 2004 to 2015

Shortly after the format change Mix 102.5 changed calls to the present-day WUMX. In 2005, WUMX began flipping to a holiday music format branded as "Christmix 102.5" (a format also shared with eventual sister station WZUN) from early November until Christmas Day. This programming choice proved popular and forced rival WLZW to begin the practice in 2009. In October 2007, Clear Channel sold WUMX along with sister stations WOUR, WRNY, and WIXT to Galaxy Communications, who kept the hot AC format and Mix 102.5 branding. The station added a new logo, slogan and slight format change to meet with the changing times in June 2015, eliminating their holiday music format. As of January 2024, the WUMX lineup consists of Big Poppa (who replaced Elvis Duran and the Morning Show) and Brett Hall.
