= K-Rockathon =

Music festival in New York state

Coordinates: 43.0744°N 76.2226°W

- Genre: Alternative rock Alternative metal Rock
- Dates: K-Rock 1: July 28, 1996; K-Rock 2: July 13, 1997; K-Rock 3: July 12, 1998; K-Rock 4: July 11, 1999; K-Rock 5: July 9, 2000; K-Rock 6: July 14, 2001; K-Rock 7: July 14, 2002; K-Rock 8: August 16, 2003; K-Rock 9: July 30, 2004; K-Rock 10: July 16, 2005; K-Rock 11: July 22, 2006; K-Rock 12: July 21, 2007; K-Rock 13: July 19, 2008; K-Rock 14: August 8, 2009; K-Rock 15: July 31, 2010; K-Rock 16: July 30, 2011 DFB 1: May 2007; DFB 2: May 24, 2008; DFB 3: May 23, 2009; DFB 4: May 29, 2010; DFB 5: May 28, 2011; DFB 6: May 27, 2012 SS2009: March 20, 2009; SS2010: April 7, 2010
- Location: Central New York
- Years active: 1996 – 2015, 2017 – 2018
- Founders: WKLL/WKRL-FM/WKRH
- Website: www.krockathon.com www.krock.com

K-Rockathon was an annual music festival held in the Central New York region of New York sponsored by Galaxy Communications-owned radio stations WKLL/WKRL-FM/WKRH. These concerts were held at venues in Vernon, Syracuse, Oswego, Utica, and Weedsport, NY. Local bands are showcased at the event along with nationally-touring rock music acts. K-Rockathon has showcased many subgenres of rock music from alternative rock, to rap rock, to straight metal and drew hundreds of thousands to Central New York over its twenty year run.

== History ==
The inaugural K-Rockathon was held on July 28, 1996, at the Vernon Downs race track in Vernon, NY. This was the same location through 1999, after which the event moved to the New York State Fairgrounds in Syracuse, New York, on July 9, 2000. The event returned to Vernon Downs after which it shifted locations almost annually. As of 2002, it drew approximately 30,000 fans annually. The festival status remains unknown as of 2019.

In 2024, a K-Rockathon Reboot was held during the New York State Fair featuring performers from prior events.
