= Syracuse Sports Network =

Collegiate sports radio network

Syracuse IMG Sports Network is the radio and television name for Syracuse University sports. The radio affiliates broadcast football, as well as men's and women's basketball and men's lacrosse games.

All the aforementioned games are broadcast via the IMG College radio network.

== Current Radio Affiliates ==
Call sign	Frequency	City	Station identification	Sports carried	Notes
WTKW/WTKV	99.5/105.5	Syracuse/Bridgeport/Oswego	TK99	Football, Men's Basketball	Also carries coaches show
WTLA/WSGO	1200/1440/97.7/100.1	Syracuse/North Syracuse/Oswego	ESPN Radio 97.7 and 100.1	Men's Lacrosse, Women's Basketball	WSGO is an alternate flagship
WGY/WGY-FM	810/103.1	Albany/Schenectady	AM 810 103.1 FM News/Talk WGY	Football, Men's Basketball	Clear-channel station
WOFX	980	Albany/Troy	Fox Sports Radio AM 980		Coaches show
WAUB/WFLR/WGVA	1590/1570/1240	Auburn/Dundee/Geneva	Finger Lakes News Network	Football, Men's Basketball	Also carries coaches show
WEBO AM/FM	1330/107.9	Binghamton/Owego	News Radio 1330 WEBO	Football, Men's Basketball	Also carries coaches show
WUSW	1270	Buffalo	1270 The Fan	Football, Men's Basketball	Also carries coaches show
WVMT	620	Burlington, VT	News/Talk 620 WVMT	Football, Men's Basketball	
WCGR	1550	Canandaigua		Football, Men's Basketball	Also carries coaches show
WENI	1450	Corning	News Talk 1450	Football, Men's Basketball	Also carries coaches show
WXHC	101.5	Cortland/Homer	X101 Always Classic 101.5	Football, Men's Basketball	
WMAJ	1230	Elmira	News Radio 1230	Football, Men's Basketball	Also carries coaches show
WPIE	1160	Ithaca/Trumansburg	Your Sportstation	Football, Men's Basketball	Also carries coaches show
WNYM	970	Hackensack, New Jersey/New York City	AM 970 The Answer	Football, Men's Basketball	Also carries coaches shows
WACK	1420	Newark	Your Hometown Station	Football, Men's Basketball	Also carries coaches show
WHAM	1180	Rochester	NewsRadio WHAM 1180	Football, Men's Basketball	Clear-channel station
WHTK	1280	Rochester	Fox Sports 1280		Coaches show
WOUR	96.9	Utica	96.9 WOUR	Football, Men's Basketball	Also carries coaches show
WNER	1410	Watertown	ESPN 1410	Football, Men's Basketball	Also carries coaches show
WTNY	790	Watertown	790 WTNY	Football, Men's Basketball	
