= WHCL-FM =

- Clinton, New York; United States
- Broadcast area: Utica, New York
- Frequency: 88.7 MHz

Programming
- Format: Variety
- Affiliations: Hamilton College

Ownership
- Owner: Trustees of Hamilton College

History
- First air date: 1941-1948, 1958
- Call sign meaning: Hamilton College

Technical information
- Licensing authority: FCC
- Facility ID: 68224
- Class: A
- ERP: 270 watts
- HAAT: 29.0 meters (95.1 ft)
- Transmitter coordinates: 43°3′4.00″N 75°24′24.00″W

Links
- Public license information: Public file; LMS
- Website: WHCL.org

WHCL-FM (88.7 FM) is an independent, non-profit, and educational college radio station licensed to the Trustees of Hamilton College operating out of Hamilton College in Clinton, New York, United States. It is the only radio station in the town of Clinton. The station serves the Utica area and broadcasts a variety of music around the Mohawk Valley. The station is student-run with a community adviser.

== Format ==
The format of WHCL has been freeform since its inception. Every semester, a weekly schedule is set comprising student, professor, and community member shows. These shows start on the top of the hour and typically last for either one or two hours. Due to the large student investment, there is a wide diversity of radio music on the show; including indie, rap, world music, country, and metal. Several professors also host shows relating to their subject of discourse, including Latin music, theatrical dramas and jazz. These music shows are also interspersed with several talk shows covering a breadth of topics, including sports discussion, politics, lyrical analysis, pop culture and culinary discourse. Specialty shows are occasionally held for notable events, including sports programming and fundraising events for alumni. At least one non-student-operated show runs on the station: Gary Sroka's "Saturday Polka Review," formerly on WUTQ and WUSP, moved to WHCL in late 2015 after WUSP suddenly shut down.

The station is in operation during the academic year and over the summer, typically between the hours of 6 AM to 2 AM, but does not operate overnight. Overnight, there is a setup that pulls various songs from a large playlist interspersed with PSAs and the WHCL call. The station does not operate between scheduled programs which are listed on the website. A stream of the broadcasting audio is available on the website.

== Development ==
In its early years, WHCL was a low-power station confined to the college campus, and its 2.5 watt signal was monaural. By the mid-1980s, however, it had expanded to 270 watts, with stereophonic broadcasting to the entire Mohawk Valley.

== Community ==
The WHCL Executive Board hosts a publication and a variety of events for the campus community. The Radio Board creates a biweekly (every other week) publication called The Wattage which chronicles new album reviews, music thought pieces, community answers to questions, and the broadcasting schedule. WHCL is also responsible for hosting and funding concerts for students on the Hamilton College campus, with various artists including Cloud Nothings, Snail Mail, Varsity, and Diet Cig. The station also hosts CD drives to benefit the station and community.
