= WBCE =

Radio station in Wickliffe, Kentucky

- Wickliffe, Kentucky; United States
- Frequency: 1200 kHz

Programming
- Format: Religious

Ownership
- Owner: Wendell D. Gray

History
- First air date: January 3, 1981
- Call sign meaning: Ballard Carlisle Entertainment; We Broadcast Christ Everyday (as a religious station)

Technical information
- Licensing authority: FCC
- Facility ID: 71209
- Class: D
- Power: 1,000 watts day
- Transmitter coordinates: 36°58′54″N 89°4′39″W

Links
- Public license information: Public file; LMS

WBCE (1200 AM) is a radio station broadcasting a religious format, licensed to Wickliffe, Kentucky, United States. The station is owned by Wendell D. Gray.

== History ==
WBCE was put on air by a pair of attorneys, Charles Geveden and Bill Cunningham, who under the Ballard-Carlisle Broadcasting Company put stations on air in Wickliffe and Eddyville. The station's call letters were chosen after WBCK, the first option in mind, was found to be in use in Battle Creek, Michigan; the station later justified the E for "Entertainment" by the time it signed on January 3, 1981, on 1010 kHz. After signing on with a country format (as well as NBC and Kentucky Network news), WBCE changed formats to gospel music on November 1, 1982, citing the glut of area stations playing country music. WBCE applied to build an FM station in Wickliffe, which was approved in 1984 after the competing applicant for the frequency dropped out, though it was never built. The AM station also got a boost when it moved from 1010 to 1200 kHz in 1985, increasing its power to 1,000 watts from 250, though it remained daytime-only in order to avoid co-frequency interference with San Antonio, Texas-based clear channel station WOAI.

In 1986, WBCE, Inc. was bought by Bibletime Ministries, an outgrowth of Faith United Church in Paducah, headed by Jim Baggett. The station had been originally backed by the Small Business Administration, but when the Beal Bank bought the loan, it accelerated the payment schedule, forcing Baggett into foreclosure in 2004. Under the impression that the station's license renewal could not be filed because of the foreclosure, Baggett did not do so; the FCC renewed the license and approved the station's sale at auction to James N. Courtney at the end of 2006, but fined the station $7,000 for the late renewal.

Courtney sold WBCE to Rev. Wendell D. Gray for $105,000 in 2011.
