= WACK =

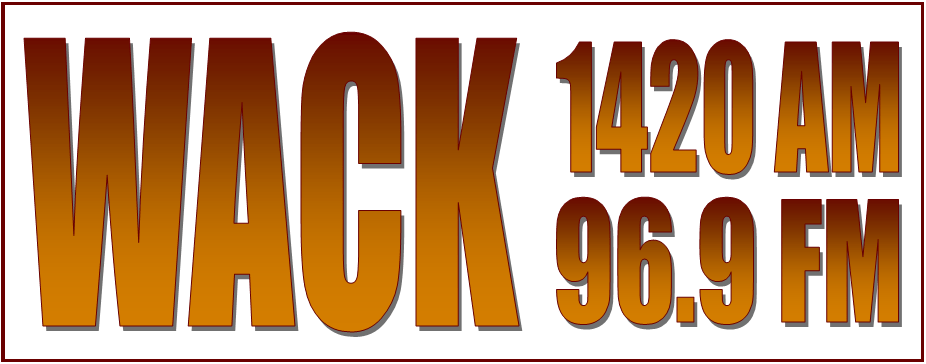
- Newark, New York; United States
- Frequency: 1420 kHz

Programming
- Format: Full-service (talk/classic hits)
- Affiliations: Fox News Radio; Premiere Networks; SportsMap; Westwood One; Buffalo Bills Radio Network; New York Yankees Radio Network; Syracuse ISP Sports Network; Motor Racing Network

Ownership
- Owner: Waynco Radio, Inc.
- Sister stations: WUUF

History
- First air date: October 19, 1957

Technical information
- Licensing authority: FCC
- Facility ID: 52123
- Class: B
- Power: 5,000 watts day 500 watts night
- Transmitter coordinates: 43°1′8″N 77°4′41″W
- Translator: 96.9 W245DI (Sodus)

Links
- Public license information: Public file; LMS
- Website: 1420wack.com

WACK (1420 AM) is a radio station broadcasting a full service format and licensed to Newark, New York, United States. The station is owned by Waynco Radio, Inc., and features programming from Fox News Radio, Premiere Networks, SportsMap, and Westwood One.

WACK is the station where Lowell Paxson, later the founder of Home Shopping Network and PAX TV, began his broadcasting career. He and Joseph “Bud” Sova bought the radio station in 1962.

Programming heard on WACK includes National Farm Report with Orion Samuelson, Farming America with Steve Alexander, America in the Morning, a classic hits-formatted local morning show hosted by Dean Amsler, The Glenn Beck Program, Chris Plante, The Dave Ramsey Show, The Sean Hannity Show, a regionally syndicated program hosted by Andrew Hollister, On the House with the Carey Brothers, and American Standards By the Sea. Any time slots not filled by programming are filled with SportsMap.

The combination of Beck, Plante, Ramsey and Hannity forms what the station dubs the "Great American Talk Show Line-Up" (prior to Beck and Plante, The Radio Factor and subsequently Dennis Miller were also included in that branding, as was The Laura Ingraham Show). Samuelson's and Alexander's programs are considered to be one show, which is given its own full half-hour time slot under the title "WACK Farm and Agribusiness Report".

Sports programs heard on WACK include the Buffalo Bills, New York Yankees, Syracuse Orange and the NASCAR Cup Series, in addition to local high school sports.

== FM translator ==
Call sign	Frequency	City of license	FID	ERP (W)	HAAT	Class	Transmitter coordinates	FCC info
W245DI	96.9 FM	Sodus, New York	202421	250	105 m (344 ft)	D	43°8′54.5″N 77°4′8.3″W	LMS
