= WBRV (AM) =

- Boonville, New York; United States
- Frequency: 900 kHz
- Branding: The Blizzard

Programming
- Format: Classic rock
- Affiliations: AP Radio, Westwood One

Ownership
- Owner: The Flack Broadcasting Group
- Sister stations: WBRV-FM, WLLG

History
- First air date: 1955
- Call sign meaning: Black River Valley

Technical information
- Licensing authority: FCC
- Facility ID: 3198
- Class: D
- Power: 1,000 watts day 52 watts night
- Transmitter coordinates: 43°30′47″N 75°21′46″W
- Translators: 98.3 W252CK (Lowville); 103.9 W280FQ (Rome); 105.9 W290BX (Boonville)

Links
- Public license information: Public file; LMS
- Webcast: Listen Live
- Website: WBRV Online

WBRV (900 AM) is a radio station broadcasting a classic rock format. Licensed to Boonville, New York, United States, the station is owned by The Flack Broadcasting Group.

== Station history ==
WBRV AM signed on in the 1950s. The station was built by local newspaper owner Livingston Lansing. The station became a member of the Northeast Radio Network after WVBN FM in nearby Turin went silent. WBRV-FM, and its repeater WLLG, both act as translators. In May 2007, WBRV became independent from the FMs and began broadcasting an oldies format. The new station was called "Oldies 900".

On January 1, 2017, WBRV changed formats from classic hits to classic rock, still branded as "The Blizzard" (info taken from stationintel.com).

== FM rebroadcasters ==
In February 2010, Flack Broadcasting acquired a former North Country Public Radio translator after it moved to a more powerful signal. The 105.9 FM translator allows WBRV to be heard more widely 24 hours a day, since WBRV is only allowed a nighttime power of 52 watts. Shortly after signing on the FM translator, WBRV changed its name from "Oldies 900" to "The Blizzard", but kept the same format.

In November 2011, Flack Broadcasting was able to acquire another North Country Public Radio translator that was being upgraded to a more powerful signal. This translator's frequency is 98.3 and should give Lowville, New York a stronger signal.

== See also ==
- List of radio stations in New York
