= WUSP (AM) =

Radio station in Utica, New York

WUSP and WRCK

WUSP: Utica, New York; WRCK: Remsen, New York; United States
- Broadcast area: Central New York Region
- Frequencies: WUSP: 1550 kHz; WRCK: 1480 kHz
- Branding: 95.5 The Heat

Programming
- Format: Urban contemporary; hip hop music

Ownership
- Owner: Utica Phoenix; (Phoenix Radio, Inc.)

History
- First air date: WUSP: 1962; WRCK: 1958
- Former call signs: WUSP: WBVM (1962–1980); WUTQ (1980–2012); WRCK: WREM (1958–1966); WADR (1966–2012)
- Call sign meaning: WUSP: Utica sports; WRCK: Rock music

Technical information
- Licensing authority: FCC
- Facility ID: WUSP: 4680; WRCK: 466
- Class: WUSP: D; WRCK: D
- Power: WUSP: 1,000 watts (day); 3 watts (night); WRCK: 5,000 watts (daytime)
- Transmitter coordinates: WUSP: 43°6′48″N 75°15′25″W; WRCK: 43°19′31″N 75°10′29″W
- Translator(s): WUSP: 95.5 W238CA (Utica); WRCK: 94.1 W231DZ (Remsen)

Links
- Public license information: WUSP: Public file; LMS; WRCK: Public file; LMS
- Webcast: Listen live
- Website: 955theheat.com

WUSP (1550 kHz) is an AM radio station in Utica, New York. Programming is simulcast on WRCK 1480 kHz in Remsen, New York. Two FM translators also carry the programming, 95.5 MHz W238CA in Utica, relaying WUSP, and 94.1 MHz W231DZ Remsen, relaying WRCK. The stations are owned by the Utica Phoenix, a local alternative newspaper, and air an urban contemporary and hip hop music radio format.

WUSP and WRCK have been silent since 2024 yet the 95.5 FM translator continues transmitting programming.

== History ==
=== WUSP ===
In 1962, WBVM signed on, owned by Michael and Daniel Fusco. WBVM was named after the Blessed Virgin Mary. It was a 1,000 watt daytimer, required to go off the air at night to avoid interfering with CBE in Windsor, Ontario, the Class I-A station on AM 1550.

WBVM became WUTQ in 1980.

From the late 1990s onward, WUTQ and sister station WADR were two of the four stations collectively known as the "Sports Stars Radio Network", a collection of four AM radio stations (WLFH in Little Falls and WRNY in Rome being the others) carrying a mix of local and national sports talk. When station owner Clear Channel Communications exited most of its small markets in 2007, the network was broken up: WLFH (now WIXT) and WRNY went to Galaxy Communications (who joined them with WTLB to form a new sports network) while WUTQ and WADR were sold to Ken Roser and became full-service outlets. In 2012, Roser moved WUTQ's programming to FM 100.7, which was rechristened WUTQ-FM.

On July 27, 2012, it was announced that Good Guys Broadcasting Corporation, a company led by two former executives at WKTV, would be purchasing WRCK and WUTQ from Roser and converting the two stations to sports radio. The purchase was consummated on December 21, 2012, at a purchase price of $350,000. The stations then began airing programming from Sports Byline USA and the USA Radio Network, with Tom Coyne (one of the two stations' owners) hosting morning drive and longtime radio host Hank Brown returning for his third stint at the station in middays. Since April 2014, the late morning timeslot has featured the Mohawk Valley Memories musical program, featuring music from the 1940s up to the 1980s. Sports included the New York Mets and the New England Patriots. The stations' previous format moved to FM 100.7 and kept the WUTQ call sign and branding, while the former WUTQ was renamed WUSP. Ethnic/specialty programming such as "The Saturday Polka Review" Polish/American show with Gary Sroka, "Radio 202" Bosnian Radio Show, The 95.5FM Hispanic Show, all on Saturday, and on Sunday; "The Family Rosary Radio" followed by "The Voice Of The New Italy" were retained by WUSP. (When WUSP ceased operations, "Radio 202" and "The Voice of New Italy" both returned to WUTQ; Sroka took his polka show to WHCL.)

In August 2013, WUSP/WRCK dropped its Sports Byline USA affiliation and affiliated with CBS Sports Radio and Yahoo! Sports Radio.

On August 5, 2015, WUSP and WRCK both went silent as a result of financial and some ongoing technical problems. The ownership's last public statement was to quote the last line of "A Visit from Saint Nicholas" ("merry Christmas to all, and to all a good night.") put out through its social media pages on Christmas Eve 2015.

As of July 2017, the WUSP and WRCK licenses were still active but silent. Good Guys Broadcasting was attempting to sell the stations and had sustained major financial losses during their ownership, having temporarily turned the stations back on to keep the license operational on June 28, 2017. Effective March 16, 2018, WUSP was purchased by Phoenix Radio, Inc, a corporation affiliated with the Utica Phoenix independent newspaper. (It is unrelated to William "Wolf" Berry's "Phoenix Radio" that operated radio stations in the Southern Tier of New York.) The purchase, at a price of $125,000, also included WUSP's translator on 95.5 FM.

=== WRCK ===
WRCK was known as WREM from its sign on in 1958 by owners Ed Slusarczyk and Jerry Prouty, until 1966, when it became WADR. WREM was unusual in that it used a shunt fed antenna.

WADR had simulcast 1550 since the late 1990s. In 2012, WADR was renamed WRCK, parking the call letters that had previously been used on FM 107.3 (now a K-Love owned-and-operated station as WKVU). On June 26, 2018, the station separated from WUSP and went silent. On May 31, 2019, WRCK went back on the air in order to keep the license active and perform equipment testing. The station had a "we play anything" type format during this period.

In early November 2019, WRCK launched translator W231DZ 94.1 and began airing "Up Music Radio", a Christian contemporary format. Studios were located at the Big Apple Music Plaza in New Hartford, New York.

WRCK eventually dropped "Up Music Radio" and left the air. In March 2024, WRCK returned to the air at 1480 AM including W231DZ 94.1 and began simulcasting the programming of WUSP 1550 AM and W238CA 95.5 FM 95.5 The Heat.
