= WMCR (AM) =

Radio station in Oneida, New York

- Oneida, New York; United States
- Broadcast area: Mohawk Valley
- Frequency: 1600 kHz
- Branding: 101.1 The Wave

Programming
- Format: Adult contemporary

Ownership
- Owner: Letitia and Robert English; (Towercast Media, LLC)

History
- First air date: September 26, 1956; 69 years ago (as WONG)
- Former call signs: WONG (1956–1961)
- Call sign meaning: Madison County Radio

Technical information
- Licensing authority: FCC
- Facility ID: 70890
- Class: D
- Power: 1,000 watts day 20 watts night
- Transmitter coordinates: 43°05′04″N 75°41′35″W
- Translator: 101.1 W266DJ (Oneida)

Links
- Public license information: Public file; LMS
- Website: wmcramfm.com

WMCR (1600 AM) is a radio station licensed to Oneida, New York, United States. The station is owned by Letitia and Robert English, through licensee Towercast Media, LLC.

== History ==
The station signed on September 26, 1956 as WONG, owned by John J. Geiger; it was transferred by 1959 to Madison County Broadcasting Corporation, which changed the call letters to WMCR on April 26, 1961 The station was sold to Chenor Communications in 1965, and to Warren Broadcasting Company in 1969.

At one time, the station simulcast with sister station WMCR-FM (106.3 FM, now WCIT-FM), which Warren signed on in 1972. After co-owner Bill Warren died in 2005, his wife Vivian Warren maintained full ownership of the stations, but ultimately decided to sell in 2009 after receiving an offer from Leatherstocking Media Group. Leatherstocking immediately announced plans to split the simulcast, and did so on February 11, 2010, when WMCR began simulcasting WFBL, a talk radio station in Syracuse.

On September 2, 2016, WMCR went silent. WMCR resumed broadcasting on July 21, 2017. Effective December 29, 2017, Leatherstocking Media sold WMCR to Towercast Media.

The station returned to the air in April 2019 with an adult contemporary format. Syracuse-based broadcaster Gary Dunes is the morning host and program director. Dunes left the station in 2020. As of mid-2026, WMCR switched to a Classic Country Format with a focus on 80's and 90's Country.

== Translator ==
Broadcast translator for WMCR
Call sign	Frequency	City of license	FID	ERP (W)	Class	Transmitter coordinates	FCC info
W266DJ	101.1 FM	Oneida, New York	201474	250	D	43°05′04″N 75°41′35″W	LMS

== Previous logo ==
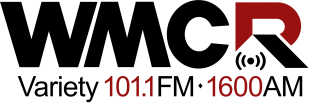
