= WKLL =

Radio station in Frankfort, New York

K-Rock (WKLL, WKRL-FM, WKRH)
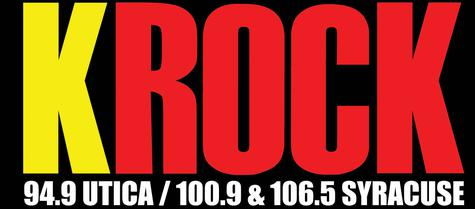
- United States
- Broadcast area: Utica–Rome metropolitan area, Syracuse metropolitan area, Oswego-Fulton, New York

Programming
- Format: Active rock
- Affiliations: Utica Comets; Syracuse Orange

Ownership
- Owner: Galaxy Media Partners
- Sister stations: WIXT; WRNY; WSGO; WTKV; WTKW; WTLA; WTLB; WUMX; WZUN; WZUN-FM

History
- Founded: 1972, with the start of WKRL-FM as WEZG-FM
- First air date: October 25, 1993, as a simulcast

Links
- Webcast: WKLL: Listen live; WKRL-FM/WKRH: Listen live; WKLL-HD2: Listen live
- Website: www.krock.com; WKLL-HD2: galaxymediapartners.com/radio/99-1-tony-fm/

WKLL, WKRL-FM, and WKRH, known together as K-Rock, are radio stations broadcasting an active rock radio format to Central New York and the Mohawk Valley. Owned by Galaxy Media Partners, the stations provide coverage of Utica-Rome area, the Syracuse metropolitan area, and the Oswego-Fulton area, respectively. Galaxy has studios and offices in Utica and Syracuse.

The oldest of the three stations is WKRL-FM (100.9 MHz), licensed to North Syracuse, which began as WSOQ-FM but was WEZG-FM from 1972 to 1993. It mostly ran an easy listening format before slowly shifting to adult contemporary in the 1980s. In 1990, Galaxy (then known as The Radio Corporation) put WKLL (94.9 MHz), licensed to Frankfort, on the air to broadcast a classic rock format to the Utica area; it soon switched to an alternative format. The Radio Corporation acquired WEZG-FM in 1993 and began the K-Rock simulcast into Syracuse. WKRH (106.5 MHz) debuted in 1996. Aside from a brief period in 2004, stemming from an abortive sale, the simulcast has retained its name and general rock orientation since then. The Central New York K-Rock stations sponsored the annual K-Rockathon music festival.

== History ==
=== WEZG-FM ===
WSOQ-FM, adjunct to WSOQ (1220 AM), began broadcasting in early 1972. On June 6, 1972, WSOQ-FM adopted a separate call sign from its AM sister and became WEZG-FM, reflecting its easy listening format.

In 1983, after a vote among listeners over whether to switch to album-oriented rock was closely divided, WEZG-FM flipped to that format, while WSOQ became WEZG on the AM band and continued with easy listening. The WEZG stations later changed to WSCY on AM and FM. The flip was not a success, and owner Sky Corp. elected to undo the flip and switch both stations back to their former easy listening format—which had been higher-rated—and WEZG call letters on February 28, 1984. Sky sold the stations in 1985 to Lorenz Broadcasting Company of Buffalo, who split them into separate formats; WEZG-FM continued with a more upbeat, soft adult contemporary sound. In 1990, the WEZG stations were purchased by Larry Levite, owner of WBEN in Buffalo.

=== WKLL ===
WKLL began broadcasting to the Utica area on February 12, 1990. It was owned by Robert Raide and Ed Levine and originally was a classic rock–formatted station known as "Classic 94.9". The LL in the call sign represented Ed Levine's daughter Lauren. The station switched to a harder rock format after being unable to top WOUR in the ratings.

=== As the K-Rock simulcast ===
Raide, Levine, and Frank Toce bought WEZG-FM and WNSS (the former WEZG AM) in 1993 and immediately assumed control under a time brokerage agreement. On October 15, the stations left the air. On October 25, WEZG-FM became WKRL-FM and began simulcasting WKLL as K-Rock, touting itself as "the station 95X"—WAQX-FM, which Levine had helped build in the late 1970s—"used to be". The K-Rock format distinguished itself from WAQX by playing harder rock geared toward a younger audience. The Utica and Syracuse stations shared programming but had separate advertising for the Utica and Syracuse areas. Levine touted the fact that costs increased 20 percent with WKRL-FM in the fold but the revenue base tripled. In 1996, K-Rock shifted to a modern rock (alternative) format.

The K-Rock simulcast was broken between March and April 2004 after Levine agreed to sell WKLL to Route 76 Radio, a subsidiary of Route 81 Radio of West Chester, Pennsylvania. Route 76, operating WKLL under a time brokerage agreement, installed an adult standards format which was to be simulcast with WTLB. Galaxy Communications was unsatisfied with Route 76's decision to change formats on the stations without consulting Galaxy, and the deal failed to close. On April 26, 2004, Galaxy reassumed control of WKLL and reinstated K-Rock.

== HD2 subchannel of WKLL ==
On September 8, 2016, WKLL signed on a new HD2 subchannel broadcasting a variety hits format as "Tony FM". The subchannel also broadcasts in Utica on low-power W256AJ at 99.1, which formerly served as a translator station for WRNY/WTLB/WIXT. An AM simulcast of the station was added on March 23, 2018 on WIXT in Little Falls.

== Technical information ==
The three K-Rock transmitters serve an area running from Utica in the east to Oswego in the west, with Syracuse in the middle.

K-Rock transmitters
Call sign	Frequency	City of license	Facility ID	ERP (W)	HAAT	Class	Transmitter coordinates	Founded	Former call signs
WKLL	94.9 FM (HD Radio)	Frankfort	54959	34,000	173 m (568 ft)	B	43°8′40.2″N 75°10′30.5″W	February 12, 1990	—
WKRL-FM	100.9 FM	North Syracuse	2876	6,000	50 m (164 ft)	A	43°9′6.2″N 76°7′56.7″W	1972	WSOQ-FM (1972); WEZG-FM (1972–1983, 1984-1993); WSCY-FM (1983–1984)
WKRH	106.5 FM	Fair Haven	20591	5,000	100 m (328 ft)	A	43°24′30.2″N 76°33′22.8″W	April 1, 1996	—
