= WBRV-FM =

Radio station in Boonville, New York

WBRV-FM and WLLG

WBRV-FM: Boonville, New York; WLLG: Lowville, New York; United States
- Broadcast area: WBRV-FM: Oneida County; WLLG: Lewis County
- Frequencies: WBRV-FM: 101.3 MHz; WLLG: 99.3 MHz
- Branding: The Moose

Programming
- Format: Country
- Affiliations: AP Radio; Westwood One

Ownership
- Owner: The Flack Broadcasting Group
- Sister stations: WBRV

History
- First air date: WBRV-FM: 1989; WLLG: 1987

Technical information
- Licensing authority: FCC
- Facility ID: WBRV-FM: 65411; WLLG: 38934
- Class: WBRV-FM: A; WLLG: A
- ERP: WBRV-FM: 4,700 watts; WLLG: 1,000 watts
- HAAT: WBRV-FM: 114 meters (374 ft); WLLG: 171 meters (561 ft)
- Transmitter coordinates: WBRV-FM: 43°26′52″N 75°20′50″W; WLLG: 43°45′12″N 75°33′50″W

Links
- Public license information: WBRV-FM: Public file; LMS; WLLG: Public file; LMS
- Webcast: Listen live
- Website: themoose.net

WBRV-FM and WLLG are commercial FM radio stations, owned by The Flack Broadcasting Group and simulcasting a country music radio format. WBRV-FM (101.3 MHz) is licensed to Boonville, New York, and WLLG (99.3 MHz) is licensed to Lowville, New York. WBRV-FM serves Oneida County, north of Utica while WLLG serves Lewis County, east of Watertown.
