= WUUF =

- Sodus, New York; United States
- Broadcast area: Rochester metropolitan area, New York
- Frequency: 103.5 MHz
- Branding: Big Dog 103.5

Programming
- Language: English
- Format: Mainstream country
- Affiliations: Westwood One; Indianapolis Motor Speedway Radio Network; Motor Racing Network; Performance Racing Network

Ownership
- Owner: Waynco Radio
- Sister stations: WACK

History
- First air date: October 31, 1989; 36 years ago
- Former call signs: WNNR-FM (1989–2002)
- Call sign meaning: Onomatopoeia for a dog's bark

Technical information
- Licensing authority: FCC
- Facility ID: 71153
- Class: A
- ERP: 6,000 watts
- HAAT: 74 meters (243 ft)
- Transmitter coordinates: 43°16′5.2″N 77°9′38.9″W

Links
- Public license information: Public file; LMS
- Webcast: Listen live
- Website: www.bigdog1035.com

WUUF (103.5 FM) is a radio station broadcasting a country music format, licensed to Sodus, New York. The station is owned by Waynco Radio and features programming from Westwood One's Mainstream Country format.

The station also carries radio coverage of NASCAR and the Indianapolis 500 from the three networks which provide it.

== History ==
The station went on the air as a rock station, WNNR-FM on October 31, 1989. The station changed its format to country on November 1, 1999 and call sign to the current WUUF on May 30, 2002.
