= WXKW (Albany, New York) =

Radio station in Albany, New York (1948–1953)

- Albany, New York; United States
- Broadcast area: Capital District
- Frequency: 850 kHz

Ownership
- Owner: Stephen Rintoul

History
- First air date: July 24, 1948
- Last air date: July 31, 1953
- Call sign meaning: "Ten kilowatts" with X as the Roman numeral for 10

Technical information
- Class: II
- Power: 10 kW unlimited

WXKW was the call sign for two unrelated AM radio stations in upstate New York; originally on 850 kHz, with a second incarnation on 1600 kHz in the 1960s.

== History ==
WXKW took to the air on July 24, 1948. It transmitted from six inline 300-foot towers, on Beaver Dam Road in Selkirk, with 10,000 watts on 850 kHz. Studios occupied the entire fifth floor of the First Trust Company Building, 444 Broadway, Albany, a beneficial arrangement, as several of the station’s managers were also bank officers. Within a month of its debut, WXKW - with its much more powerful signal - managed to steal the ABC radio network from WOKO.

WXKW was plagued with technical and legal problems from day one. Its towers were supposed to beam its signal north and south, to protect WHDH Boston, on the same frequency, and KOA Denver, which reached 38 states at night. However, WXKW’s antenna array - the first of its kind in the country - proved an engineering nightmare, never operating to specs. Parts of its signal spilled out east and west. WHDH and KOA immediately filed interference complaints with the FCC. The Bureau mandated that WXKW lower its night power by 90 percent, to a mere 1,000 Watts, until hearings could be held.

Hearings were scheduled and rescheduled, dragging on almost indefinitely. The station operated on a conditional license for the better part of its lifetime. Although audible from Lake George to Kingston during the day, WXKW continued to limp along on low power at night. There was conjecture in the broadcasting community that WGY, owned by General Electric, and unhappy about having a powerful competitor just four channels up the dial, was doing its best in Washington to make life miserable for WXKW.

At the time of its inception, WXKW (which began as WRWR) had also filed a TV application, just when the FCC instituted a freeze on licenses. When the freeze was lifted in 1952, there was a scramble among the area broadcasters for the two precious new UHF channels. A year later, in a complicated deal to end the rivalry for channel 23, Champlain Valley Broadcasting Corporation (WXKW’s owners) withdrew WXKW from the field and sold its physical assets (transmitter sites in Selkirk and Pinnacle Mountain in the Helderbergs, plus transmitting equipment) for $300,000 to the other three applicants. Management insisted it did so to spare lengthy litigation that would impede the development of local TV, but more likely the buyout - which mandated the station cease operations - enabled a clean exit from a messy operation.

WXKW/850 went silent at midnight on July 31, 1953.
