= Mattydale, New York =

- Census-designated place
- Location in Onondaga County and the state of New York.
- Coordinates: 43°5′55″N 76°8′37″W
- Country: United States
- State: New York
- County: Onondaga

Area
  - Total: 1.92 sq mi (4.97 km^{2})
  - Land: 1.92 sq mi (4.97 km^{2})
  - Water: 0 sq mi (0.00 km^{2})
- Elevation: 404 ft (123 m)

Population (2020)
  - Total: 6,296
  - Density: 3,278.4/sq mi (1,265.78/km^{2})
- Time zone: UTC-5 (Eastern (EST))
  - Summer (DST): UTC-4 (EDT)
- ZIP code: 13211
- Area code: 315
- FIPS code: 36-46151
- GNIS feature ID: 0956687

Mattydale is a hamlet (and census-designated place) in Onondaga County, New York, United States. As of the 2020 census, Mattydale had a population of 6,296.

Mattydale is a community in the northeast part of the town of Salina and is a northern suburb of Syracuse.

Mattydale was named for the farm of Frank Matty.

Although born in nearby Chittenango, New York, Wizard of Oz author L. Frank Baum spent much of his childhood on the site of Roxboro Road Middle School. He later moved to the Sports-O-Rama roller rink site on the first plank road in the country known as Route 11. Freethought Trail says, "The yellowish hemlock wood of the plank road may have been an inspiration for the Yellow Brick Road". A vacant lot since the Sports-O-Rama skating rink was torn down in 2015, the site previously featured two roadhouses after the Baum family residence. Built in succession following fires, the last roadhouse/hotel succumbed to blazes in 1957 and the final fire in 1958.

== Geography ==
Mattydale is located at 43°5′55″N 76°8′37″W (43.098717, -76.143530). It is north of Syracuse.

According to the United States Census Bureau, the community has a total area of 1.9 square miles (4.9 km^{2}), all land.

The New York State Thruway (Interstate 90) passes across the community. The Thruway intersects Interstate 81 west of Mattydale.

Mattydale is southwest of Syracuse Hancock International Airport and borders the community of Hinsdale.

Ley Creek, which flows along the south part of Mattydale, enters Onondaga Lake a few miles southwest of the village.

== Demographics ==
Historical population
Census	Pop.	Note	%±
2020	6,296		—
U.S. Decennial Census

=== 2020 census ===
As of the 2020 census, Mattydale had a population of 6,296. The median age was 38.6 years. 22.4% of residents were under the age of 18 and 14.8% of residents were 65 years of age or older. For every 100 females there were 98.9 males, and for every 100 females age 18 and over there were 94.7 males age 18 and over.

100.0% of residents lived in urban areas, while 0.0% lived in rural areas.

There were 2,611 households in Mattydale, of which 26.6% had children under the age of 18 living in them. Of all households, 33.2% were married-couple households, 22.9% were households with a male householder and no spouse or partner present, and 31.8% were households with a female householder and no spouse or partner present. About 31.5% of all households were made up of individuals and 12.7% had someone living alone who was 65 years of age or older.

There were 2,816 housing units, of which 7.3% were vacant. The homeowner vacancy rate was 1.3% and the rental vacancy rate was 11.6%.

Racial composition as of the 2020 census
Race	Number	Percent
White	4,940	78.5%
Black or African American	389	6.2%
American Indian and Alaska Native	50	0.8%
Asian	251	4.0%
Native Hawaiian and Other Pacific Islander	8	0.1%
Some other race	97	1.5%
Two or more races	561	8.9%
Hispanic or Latino (of any race)	349	5.5%

=== 2000 census ===
As of the census of 2000, there were 6,367 people, 2,631 households, and 1,673 families residing in the community. The population density was 3,323.3 inhabitants per square mile (1,283.1/km^{2}). There were 2,804 housing units at an average density of 1,463.6 per square mile (565.1/km^{2}). The racial makeup of the CDP was 94.33% White, 1.74% African American, 0.86% Native American, 0.80% Asian, 0.03% Pacific Islander, 0.68% from other races, and 1.55% from two or more races. Hispanic or Latino of any race were 2.14% of the population.

There were 2,631 households, out of which 29.8% had children under the age of 18 living with them, 42.5% were married couples living together, 15.6% had a female householder with no husband present, and 36.4% were non-families. 29.7% of all households were made up of individuals, and 13.2% had someone living alone who was 65 years of age or older. The average household size was 2.42 and the average family size was 2.99.

In the CDP, the population was spread out, with 25.4% under the age of 18, 7.4% from 18 to 24, 30.6% from 25 to 44, 20.0% from 45 to 64, and 16.5% who were 65 years of age or older. The median age was 37 years. For every 100 females, there were 91.4 males. For every 100 females age 18 and over, there were 86.3 males.

The median income for a household in the CDP was $35,387, and the median income for a family was $43,668. Males had a median income of $32,917 versus $25,808 for females. The per capita income for the CDP was $19,030. About 6.4% of families and 9.9% of the population were below the poverty line, including 11.4% of those under age 18 and 6.3% of those age 65 or over.

== Education ==
Almost all of it is in the North Syracuse Central School District while a portion is in Liverpool Central School District.
