= WSGO =

- Oswego, New York; United States
- Broadcast area: Syracuse metropolitan area
- Frequency: 1440 kHz
- Branding: ESPN Radio 100.1

Programming
- Format: sports radio
- Affiliations: ESPN Radio; New York Giants Radio Network; NFL on Westwood One; Syracuse Crunch; Syracuse ISP Sports Network (Syracuse Orange)

Ownership
- Owner: Galaxy Media Partners; (Galaxy Syracuse Licensee LLC)
- Sister stations: WKRH; WKRL-FM; WTKV; WTKW; WTLA; WZUN-FM

History
- First air date: March 6, 1961
- Call sign meaning: Oswego

Technical information
- Licensing authority: FCC
- Facility ID: 24130
- Class: D
- Power: 1,000 watts (day); 45 watts (night)
- Transmitter coordinates: 43°24′56″N 76°28′0″W
- Translator: 100.1 W261AC (Oswego)

Links
- Public license information: Public file; LMS
- Webcast: Listen live
- Website: espnsyracuse.com

WSGO (1440 AM) is a commercial radio station, licensed to Oswego, New York, and serving the northern suburbs of the Syracuse metropolitan area. The station is owned by Galaxy Media Partners and airs a sports radio format.

The station, like most of Galaxy Media Partners' Oswego cluster, is a direct repeater of a Syracuse sister station, in WSGO's case, WTLA (1200 AM). Like WTLA, it simulcasts programming full-time on a 220-watt FM translator, W261AC, on 100.1 MHz).

WSGO operates with 1,000 watts by day. At night, when radio waves travel farther, it reduces power to 45 watts to avoid interfering with other stations on AM 1440. It uses a non-directional antenna at all times, located on Dutch Ridge Road in Oswego, adjacent to Route 481.

== Programming ==
WSGO and WTLA have two local weekday sports shows, in middays and afternoon drive time. The rest of the schedule features programming from ESPN Radio, the Syracuse ISP Sports Network (carrying Syracuse University sports), the New York Giants Radio Network and the NFL on Westwood One. They had previously carried New York Mets baseball games until the New York Mets Radio Network was discontinued in 2019 due to the high cost of satellite time.

== History ==
WSGO signed on the air on March 6, 1961. It was owned by Clifford C. Harris and the studios were in the Pontiac Hotel. Originally WSGO was a daytimer, required to go off the air at sunset to avoid interfering with other radio stations on 1440 AM at night when radio waves travel farther. In the 1990s, it got permission from the Federal Communications Commission to stay on the air at night, at only 45 watts.

In 2000, it was acquired by Galaxy Communications. The studios and offices were relocated to Syracuse and WSGO became a full time simulcast station to 1200 WTLA. For a time, it aired an adult standards format, from the "Music of Your Life" network. It switched to sports radio in 2010, affiliating with ESPN Radio.
