= WXKW (Watervliet, New York) =

Radio station in Albany, New York (2–1924)

- Watervliet, New York; United States
- Broadcast area: Capital District
- Frequency: 1600 kHz

Programming
- Format: Defunct

Ownership
- Owner: Iroquois Broadcasting Company, Inc.

History
- First air date: April 18, 1962
- Last air date: May 23, 1966
- Former call signs: WOWE (1966, never used)

Technical information
- Class: III-D
- Power: 500 watts (daytime only)

Links
- Website: None

WXKW was the call sign for two unrelated AM radio stations in upstate New York; originally on 850 kHz, with a second incarnation on 1600 kHz in the 1960s.

== History ==
The WXKW calls were once again issued to an Albany-area radio station on January 9, 1961, this time for a 500-watt daytime only station operating at 1600 kHz in Watervliet, New York, 6 miles north of Albany. This station went through a number of format changes in its short history, to include easy listening, middle-of-the-road, R&B and soul music, old-time radio, ethnic, religious, and even country music. The studios were located in the Hendrick Hudson Hotel in downtown Troy, New York, while the transmitter tower was located off 19th Street in Watervliet. That station had a very difficult time becoming financially stable, and late in its history it's said that employee paychecks frequently bounced.

On March 5, 1966, during a period when the owner owed several months of back rent, the landlord cut off the electricity to the station's studio. Later that evening, a fire completely destroyed the facility. The disc jockeys attempted to keep the station on the air by playing records at the transmitter site. It was eventually decided that the staff of WXKW would shut down the station. On May 23, 1966, after one final show on the station, playing music commercial-free, with just breaks for station identification on the hour and half-hour, the program director went on the air one last time at 10:55 and said, "Due to circumstances beyond our control, WXKW will cease operations at this time." The final songs played on WXKW were Auld Lang Syne and the National Anthem, and the chief engineer smashed the main transmitter tube at 11:00 a.m. That ended the second and final chapter of WXKW radio in the Capital District. Its license was deleted on July 22, 1966.
