= WTLA =

ESPN Radio affiliate in North Syracuse, New York

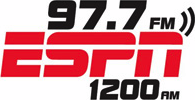
- North Syracuse, New York; United States
- Broadcast area: Syracuse metropolitan area
- Frequency: 1200 kHz
- Branding: ESPN Radio 97.7

Programming
- Format: Sports
- Affiliations: ESPN Radio; Syracuse Crunch; Syracuse ISP Sports Network (Syracuse University); New York Giants Radio Network; NFL on Westwood One

Ownership
- Owner: Galaxy Media Partners; (Galaxy Syracuse Licensee LLC)
- Sister stations: WKRL-FM; WKRH; WSGO; WTKV; WTKW; WZUN-FM

History
- First air date: August 1, 1959
- Former call signs: WSOQ (1959–1984); WEZG (1984–1985); WURS (1985–1988); WXRA (1988–1991); WNSS (1991–1993); WKRL (1993–1995)
- Former frequencies: 1220 kHz (1959–1991)

Technical information
- Licensing authority: FCC
- Facility ID: 54546
- Class: B
- Power: 1,000 watts
- Transmitter coordinates: 43°9′6″N 76°7′58″W
- Translator: 97.7 W249BC (Mattydale)
- Repeater: 1440 WSGO (Oswego)

Links
- Public license information: Public file; LMS
- Webcast: Listen live
- Website: www.espncny.com

WTLA (1200 AM; "ESPN Radio 97.7") is a commercial radio station licensed to North Syracuse, New York, and serving the Syracuse metropolitan area. The station is owned by Galaxy Media Partners and airs a sports radio format. Programming is also simulcast on co-owned WSGO (1400 AM) in Oswego, New York.

WTLA operates with 1,000 watts. Because 1200 AM is a clear channel frequency reserved for Class A station WOAI in San Antonio, WTLA uses a directional antenna at night to avoid interference when radio waves travel farther. WTLA's transmitter is off Davis Road North in Cicero, New York, near Interstate 481. WTLA also is heard on 120-watt FM translator W249BC at 97.7 MHz in nearby Mattydale, New York.

== Programming ==
WTLA and WSGO have several local weekday sports shows, in middays and afternoon drive time. The rest of the schedule features programming from ESPN Radio, the Syracuse ISP Sports Network (carrying Syracuse University sports), the New York Giants Radio Network and the NFL on Westwood One. WTLA and WSGO had previously carried New York Mets baseball games until the New York Mets Radio Network was discontinued in 2019 due to the high cost of satellite time.

== History ==
The station signed on the air August 1, 1959. Its call sign was WSOQ and it broadcast on 1220 AM. On that frequency, WSOQ was a daytimer. Due to longer established stations on 1220, WSOQ had to go off the air at sunset each day to avoid interference. The station was owned by Sol Panitz and Harry Winton, and was an affiliate of the Mutual Broadcasting System.

Over the years, the station used the call letters WEZG, WURS, and WXRA.

In 1991, the station moved to 1200 AM. It had attempted to move its spot on the dial since 1980, hoping to find a frequency where it could broadcast around the clock. A few months later, the station was renamed WNSS. It then became WKRL in 1993, and WTLA in 1995.

Until March 5, 2010, WTLA offered an adult standards format from the "Music of Your Life" network. On that date, it affiliated with ESPN Radio. A local afternoon show, "Disturbing The Peace" was added in May 2010, focusing on Syracuse and New York sports. In January 2011, programs hosted by Mike Bristol (who had previously been heard on WHEN) were picked up by WTLA.

Actor Daniel Baldwin began hosting a one-hour weekday sports program on WTLA and WSGO in 2017. The show ended in April 2019.

== Translators ==
Call sign	Frequency	City of license	FID	ERP (W)	Class	FCC info
W249BC	97.7 FM	Mattydale, New York	618	120	D	LMS
