= WTKW =

Classic rock-formatted radio station in Bridgeport/Syracuse, New York

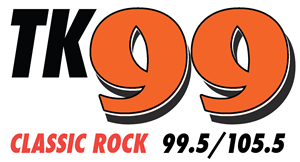
- Bridgeport, New York; United States
- Broadcast area: Syracuse/Oswego
- Frequency: 99.5 MHz (HD Radio)
- Branding: TK99

Programming
- Format: Classic rock
- Subchannels: HD2: WTLA simulcast

Ownership
- Owner: Galaxy Media Partners; (Galaxy Syracuse Licensee LLC)
- Sister stations: WKRL-FM, WTLA, WZUN-FM

History
- First air date: 1992; 34 years ago

Technical information
- Licensing authority: FCC
- Facility ID: 22234
- Class: A
- ERP: 5,700 watts
- HAAT: 103 meters (338 ft)
- Transmitter coordinates: 43°9′24.2″N 75°57′23.7″W
- Translator: 99.1 W256AC (Solvay)

Links
- Public license information: Public file; LMS
- Webcast: Listen live
- Website: tk99.net

Satellite station
- WTKV
- Minetto, New York; United States
- Frequency: 105.5 MHz

Ownership
- Owner: Galaxy Media Partners; (Galaxy Syracuse Licensee LLC (New))
- Sister stations: WKRH, WSGO

History
- First air date: 1973; 53 years ago
- Former call signs: WSGO-FM (1973–1989); WGES (1989–1996)

Technical information
- Facility ID: 24131
- Class: A
- ERP: 4,000 watts
- HAAT: 121 meters (397 ft)
- Transmitter coordinates: 43°24′56.2″N 76°27′52.8″W

Links
- Public license information: Public file; LMS

WTKW (99.5 FM "TK99") is a classic rock radio station in Bridgeport, New York. The station broadcasts to the Syracuse, New York market.

WTKW was launched in 1992 as a country music station under the leadership of Bob Paris (real name Gary W. Gallup), a longtime disc jockey in Syracuse. It was changed to its current classic rock format in 1993 when Classic Rock 104.3 KIX-FM (WKFM, now WFRG-FM) became country-formatted Big Frog 104 and the Syracuse radio market was left without a classic rock radio station. The station also simulcasts on full-power satellite WTKV (105.5 FM) in Minetto, New York (serving Oswego) and low-power translator W256AC (99.1 FM) for Downtown Syracuse.

In April 2007, WTKW/WTKV became the flagship station of Syracuse University athletics with play-by-play coverage of Men's Football, Men's Basketball and Men's Lacrosse games. The station also broadcasts New York Yankees baseball games.
