= WCIT-FM =

- Oneida, New York; United States
- Broadcast area: Utica, New York
- Frequency: 106.3 MHz
- Branding: Family Life Network

Programming
- Format: Contemporary Christian
- Network: Family Life Network

Ownership
- Owner: Family Life Ministries

History
- First air date: September 1972; 53 years ago (as WMCR-FM)
- Former call signs: WMCR-FM (1972–2016)
- Call sign meaning: "Where Christ is Truth"

Technical information
- Licensing authority: FCC
- Facility ID: 58038
- Class: A
- ERP: 1,250 watts
- HAAT: 219 meters (719 ft)
- Transmitter coordinates: 43°2′48″N 75°39′58″W

Links
- Public license information: Public file; LMS
- Website: familylife.org/radio/

WCIT-FM (106.3 MHz) is a radio station broadcasting Family Life Network's contemporary Christian music format. Licensed to Oneida, New York, United States, the station serves central New York with an emphasis on Madison and Oneida counties.

== History ==
The former WMCR-FM flipped from classic hits to Family Life Network's contemporary Christian music format in March 2016, with a call sign change on April 6, 2016, to WCIT-FM.
