= WIXT (AM) =

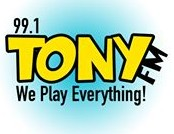
- Little Falls, New York; United States
- Broadcast area: Mohawk Valley region
- Frequency: 1230 kHz
- Branding: 99.1 Tony FM

Programming
- Format: Variety hits

Ownership
- Owner: Galaxy Media Partners; (Galaxy Utica Licensee LLC)
- Sister stations: WKLL, WRNY, WTLB

History
- First air date: June 22, 1952
- Former call signs: WLFH (1952–2005)
- Call sign meaning: Channel Nine ("IX" as a Roman numeral) Television; callsign transferred from that station (now WSYR-TV) in Syracuse to prevent competitor re-use during Clear Channel ownership by both stations

Technical information
- Licensing authority: FCC
- Facility ID: 57701
- Class: C
- Power: 1,000 watts
- Transmitter coordinates: 43°2′33″N 74°51′31″W
- Translators: 99.1 W256AJ (Utica, relays WKLL-HD2)
- Repeater: 94.9 WKLL-HD2 (Frankfort)

Links
- Public license information: Public file; LMS
- Webcast: Listen live
- Website: galaxymediapartners.com/radio/99-1-tony-fm/

WIXT is an AM radio station broadcasting on a frequency of 1230 kHz and licensed to the city of Little Falls, New York. Owned by Galaxy Media Partners, the station airs a variety hits format under the branding Tony FM 99.1.

== History of WIXT ==
WIXT signed on June 22, 1952, under the callsign WLFH (the call letters stood for Little Falls and nearby Herkimer, two of its primary communities). Owner Robert (Mouse) Feldman built the station to promote his furniture business next door. It was the first full-time radio station in Herkimer County. The 1230 frequency had previously been occupied by WIBX in nearby Utica from 1941 until it moved to the 950 frequency in 1947. Broadcasting from a studio on South Second Street (in a building which still houses its transmitter), WLFH was a typical full service station offering a variety of formats, including MOR and Top 40. By the end of the 1980s, WLFH was a country music station. In 1994, WLFH became part of Bug Country, simulcasting WBUG-FM in Fort Plain and WBUG (now WVTL) in Amsterdam. The stations mostly broadcast the Real Country satellite classic country format from ABC Radio, but retained some local production.

In 2000, WLFH was acquired by Clear Channel Communications (now iHeartMedia) and became part of a four-station simulcast known as the "Sports Stars Radio Network", along with WRNY in Rome, WADR (now WRCK) in Remsen and WUTQ (now WUSP) in Utica. The stations carried a variety of local and syndicated sports talk programming, along with live coverage of local sporting events. The Sports Stars network also carried an affiliation with Fox Sports Radio, as was the standard for Clear Channel sports radio stations. In 2005, as part of a company-wide rebranding, television station WIXT (channel 9) in Syracuse changed its call sign to WSYR-TV, and Clear Channel chose to park the WIXT calls on WLFH to maintain control of them.

In 2007, Clear Channel divested its Utica stations, including WIXT. The station, along with WRNY, was transferred to Galaxy Communications, which retained their sports format and paired the two stations with its own WTLB. WIXT remained associated with Fox Sports Radio, but the stations changed their identification from "Sports Stars" to "1310 The Game." In 2010, Galaxy reached an affiliation deal with ESPN Radio, in which their Utica and Syracuse AM stations would join the network. The deal took effect on March 5, and WTLB/WIXT/WRNY promptly dropped Fox Sports to join ESPN.

In 2016 Galaxy moved their Utica studios (WKLL, WOUR, WUMX, WTLB, WRNY and WIXT) from Washington Mills to Downtown Utica inside the new Landmarc Building (the old HSBC Location) and renamed it Galaxy Media. Inside their new location the walls on the side of the street for each studio are made entirely of glass, allowing people to see DJs at work similar to the "Good Morning America" Studios (Galaxy has long used a similar layout for their studio in Syracuse).

== History of Tony FM ==
In 2012, Galaxy Communications acquired translator W256AJ on 99.1 MHz (originally W259AC on 99.7 MHz until 1999) from the Christian Broadcasting System, owners of WJIV, moved the translator from Hotel Utica to the top of Smith Hill, and boosted its power. The new signal began simulcasting WRNY's programs on September 13, 2012. On September 8, 2016, W256AJ broke from its WRNY simulcast to become variety hits-formatted Tony FM, a simulcast of WKLL-HD2. Galaxy then switched WIXT to Tony FM on March 23, 2018, in order to ensure full market coverage of the format.

== See also ==
- WRNY (AM)
