= Galaxy Media Partners =

Radio broadcasting company in Central New York

- Industry: Radio broadcasting
- Founded: February 12, 1990
- Key people: Ed Levine (President)
- Website: galaxymediapartners.com

Galaxy Media Partners (formerly Galaxy Communications) is a radio broadcasting company with radio stations entirely in the Central New York area. As of 2024, Galaxy owns 13 radio signals in New York.

== History ==
Ed Levine, the company's president, attended the Newhouse School at Syracuse University where his love for radio began. After serving as program director for the college radio station, Levine and two classmates started Syracuse’s first live FM radio station in 1978. On February 12, 1990, the first Galaxy station, WKLL was launched by Levine, and his business partner, Bob Raide. WKLL was named for Ed and wife Pam’s then-19-month-old daughter Lauren. In the 1990s, Galaxy launched additional stations in Syracuse and Utica. In 2001, the headquarters was moved from Bridgeport to a new building in Armory Square, located in downtown Syracuse. WKLL remains owned by Galaxy to this day.

The company was originally named The Radio Corporation; it became Galaxy Communications in May 2000 after a $23 million recapitalization.

Galaxy divested itself of its Albany, New York, cluster and swapped several stations in a multi-owner deal that included Clear Channel Communications in Utica/Rome in 2007. In 2013, Ed Levine became the sole owner after a $13.2 million buyout from the former majority shareholder.

In 2016 Galaxy moved their Utica studios (WKLL, WUMX, WTLB and WRNY) from Washington Mills to Downtown Utica inside the brand new Landmarc building (the old HSBC location) and renamed it Galaxy Media in 2018.

In October 2016, Galaxy Communications (through Galaxy II Media, LLC) agreed to acquire Gamma Broadcasting's stations in Berkshire County, Massachusetts for $3.15 million: WBEC, WBEC-FM, and WUPE in Pittsfield, WNAW and WUPE-FM in North Adams, and WSBS in Great Barrington. The acquisition was never completed; the Gamma stations were instead purchased by Townsquare Media in 2017.

In 2018, Galaxy Communications rebranded to Galaxy Media Company and brought aboard 10 new investors to buy out the shares that had been owned by a private investment firm and help the company reduce debt. The investors included Syracuse University basketball coach Jim Boeheim. Also in 2018, Townsquare Media acquired WOUR in Utica from Galaxy.

The Rasselas Trust alleged that in August 2025, Galaxy had fallen into a short-term cash crunch and had approached Rasselas with a loan request, and that Rasselas offered a million-dollar loan in exchange for Galaxy's events division as collateral; Galaxy allegedly never paid back the loan, and in February 2026, Rasselas obtained—but withdrew without ever enforcing—a restraining order which would have effectively shut Galaxy down. The withdrawal coincided with Levine selling the events business to Louis Santaro. Ed Levine announced his retirement in August 2026, effective at the end of the year, as he relocates to North Carolina; Galaxy will continue operations for the time being as the company had begun restructuring its executive team in January of that year, with a possible sale in the future.

On September 29, 2026, Galaxy announced it was being acquired by James Morrell and his family, doing business as Pamal Broadcasting, with Morrell set to take over the stations on October 1. Pamal operates 19 stations in the eastern portions of New York State.

== Stations ==
=== Syracuse/Oswego ===
- WTKW/WTKV - classic rock ("TK")
- WKRL/WKRH - active rock ("K-Rock")
- WZUN (Classic Hits)
- WTLA/WSGO (ESPN Radio)
- WZUN-FM - classic hits ("Sunny")

=== Utica/Rome ===
- WKLL - active rock ("K-rock")
- WTLB / WRNY (AM) (ESPN Radio)
- WUMX - hot adult contemporary ("Mix")
- WIXT - variety hits ("Tony FM")

== Former ==
Several stations formerly in the Galaxy family were sold to the Educational Media Foundation.

- WOUR, Now owned by Townsquare Media.
- The Bone of Albany, New York: (WOOB and WBOE, now WYAI and WYKV respectively)
- WSCP-FM of Sandy Creek/Pulaski, New York (now WGKV)
- WRCK in Utica (now WKVU) - Swapped with WOUR
- WOKR: Remsen, New York (now WAWR)

== Pop culture ==
In February 2024, Galaxy Media was featured on The American Dream, a Bloomberg TV series.
