= WZUN-FM =

Phoenix, New York; United States
- Broadcast area: Syracuse metropolitan area
- Frequency: 102.1 MHz
- Branding: 102.1 - Sunny 102

Programming
- Format: Classic hits

Ownership
- Owner: Edward Levine (Galaxy Media Partners); (Galaxy Syracuse Licensee LLC)
- Sister stations: WKRL-FM, WTKW, WZUN

History
- First air date: 1995 (as WRDS)
- Former call signs: WRDS (1995–2000); WZUN (2000–2018)
- Call sign meaning: "Sun" (with the Z as a reversed S)

Technical information
- Licensing authority: FCC
- Facility ID: 60253
- Class: A
- ERP: 6,000 watts
- HAAT: 81 meters (266 ft)
- Transmitter coordinates: 43°6′4″N 76°16′58″W
- Translator(s): 106.1 W291BU (Fulton)

Links
- Public license information: Public file; LMS
- Webcast: Listen live
- Website: sunnysyracuse.com

WZUN-FM (102.1 MHz "Sunny 102") is a commercial FM radio station licensed to Phoenix, New York, and serving the Syracuse metropolitan area. The station is owned by Edward Levine's Galaxy Media Partners through licensee Galaxy Syracuse Licensee LLC. It airs a classic hits radio format.

The studios and offices are on Walton Street in Syracuse. The transmitter is off Van Buren Road in Van Buren. Programming is also heard on AM 1070 WZUN in Sandy Creek-Pulaski and a 250-watt translator in Fulton, W291BU at 106.1 MHz.

== History ==
The station first went on the air as WRDS in 1995. The station used the syndicated urban adult contemporary service known as "The Touch" with the syndicated Tom Joyner Morning Show heard in the morning.

On December 20, 2000, the station changed its call sign to WZUN. It aired a soft adult contemporary format, calling itself "Sunny 102". On September 12, 2009, WZUN switched from soft AC to classic hits.

Effective October 1, 2013, Galaxy Communications sold the station to Wayne Mack's WZUN Communications LLC for $1 million. The move was made primarily to address ownership caps in the market. Oswego and Syracuse are considered to be in the same market in terms of FCC regulations. Galaxy owns two other stations in Syracuse, 100.9 WKRL-FM "K-Rock" and 99.5 WTKW "TK99," as well as two in the Oswego area. This meant Galaxy would have five FM stations in Central New York, one more than allowed. The ownership of these stations was allowed under a grandfather clause, but a restructuring of Galaxy Communications's corporate structure resulted in the station cluster losing its grandfathered status.

In March 2016, Galaxy combined WZUN-FM's DJs with the on-air staff of WSEN-FM 92.1. The newly merged station at 102.1 was initially expected to carry the "WSEN-FM" call sign. This turned out not to be the case, as Craig Fox, who was purchasing FM 92.1, parked the WSEN call letters on his own rival station on 103.9 FM. WZUN once again came under the ownership of Galaxy Communications, after it got its grandfather clause status reinstated. Galaxy bought the 102.1 license back from Mack on February 29. The move was made as WSEN-FM's previous frequency, 92.1, was traded away to Craig Fox in a three-way station trade that involved Fox, and the religious Family Life Network. These dealings resulted in Syracuse being a rare radio market with competing classic hits stations.

The station began sharing its call sign with its sister station on AM 1070 (formerly WSCP) in June 2018, with 102.1 becoming WZUN-FM and 1070 becoming WZUN. AM 1070 is now part of a simulcast with WZUN-FM.
