= WIVT =

Television station in Binghamton, New York

- Binghamton, New York; United States
- Channels: Digital: 27 (UHF); Virtual: 34
- Branding: News 34; NBC 5 (34.2)

Programming
- Affiliations: 34.1: ABC; 34.2: NBC (WBGH-CD); for others, see § Subchannels

Ownership
- Owner: Nexstar Media Group; (Nexstar Media Inc.)
- Sister stations: WBGH-CD

History
- First air date: November 24, 1962
- Former call signs: WBJA-TV (1962–1978); WMGC-TV (1978–1998)
- Former channel numbers: Analog: 34 (UHF, 1962–2009); Digital: 4 (VHF, 2003–2009), 34 (UHF, 2009–2019)
- Call sign meaning: Variant of sister station WIXT (now WSYR-TV); IV (Roman numeral 4) Television (former digital channel)

Technical information
- Licensing authority: FCC
- Facility ID: 11260
- ERP: 298 kW
- HAAT: 275.4 m (904 ft)
- Transmitter coordinates: 42°3′39″N 75°56′35″W

Links
- Public license information: Public file; LMS
- Website: www.binghamtonhomepage.com

WIVT (channel 34) is a television station in Binghamton, New York, United States, affiliated with ABC. It is owned by Nexstar Media Group alongside low-power, Class A NBC affiliate WBGH-CD (channel 20). The two stations share studios on Ingraham Hill Road in the town of Binghamton, where WIVT's transmitter is also located.

== History ==
Alfred E. Anscombe, former general manager of WKBW-AM-TV in Buffalo, secured a construction permit for Binghamton's third television station on April 25, 1961. He named it WBJA-TV after his wife Beth J. Anscombe. Initially, the station was allocated to UHF analog channel 56. However, five years earlier, two competing ABC affiliates in Northeastern Pennsylvania (WILK-TV channel 34 in Wilkes-Barre and WARM-TV channel 16 in Scranton) merged to form WNEP-TV, retaining WILK's license but using WARM's old UHF channel 16.

Seeing a chance to use more signal at less cost, Anscombe sought and won a new construction permit for analog channel 34. The new station signed on November 24, 1962, from studios at its transmitter site on Ingraham Hill south of Binghamton; it was the third station to sign on in the Binghamton area, after WBNG and WICZ-TV. It has always been an ABC affiliate. Channel 56 would eventually be used in Hazleton, Pennsylvania, where WWLF-TV went on the air in 1985.

Anscombe planned for WBJA to be the first station in a seven-station group; however, only one other station, WEPA-TV in Erie, Pennsylvania (now defunct; its channel 66 allocation was later used by WFXP), was started before the two stations were acquired by Gerald Arthur, Oliver Lazare, and Jules Hessen, a group who also owned WEEE in Rensselaer, in 1966. Pinnacle Communications bought WBJA in 1978 and changed the call letters to WMGC-TV on October 16, reflecting its new "Magic 34" branding. It dropped the branding by the mid to late-1980s, but retained the call letters.

Former WIVT logo.

Pinnacle sold WMGC to Citadel Communications in 1986; in 1995, Citadel sold the station, along with WVNY in Burlington, Vermont, to USA Broadcast Group, which was soon renamed U.S. Broadcast Group after a complaint from USA Network. U.S. Broadcast Group put its stations up for sale in early 1997; WSKG-TV contemplated acquiring WMGC and operating it as an NBC affiliate to raise money for its public broadcasting operations; during this time, a cable-only version of WETM (which would be replaced by WBGH-CD later that fall) served as the network's affiliate for the Binghamton market following WICZ's affiliation with Fox in April 1996. The station would be purchased by the Ackerley Group, which changed the call letters to WIVT on February 26, 1998. The call letters were derived from Ackerley's station in Syracuse, WIXT.

A few months later, Ackerley nearly lost its investment. On May 31, 1998, a tornado ripped through WIVT's Ingraham Hill studios and destroyed its tower; radio stations WSKG-FM, WSQX and WAAL also had their towers destroyed in that storm. WBNG had live reports that night literally from the WIVT facilities. The station had a feed restored to Time Warner Cable for customers in the immediate Binghamton area, but was off-the-air for several months. WIVT became a sister station to WBGH when that station was sold by Smith Television to Ackerley in 2000. Ackerley merged with Clear Channel Communications (now iHeartMedia) on June 14, 2002. On April 20, 2007, the company entered into an agreement to sell its entire television stations group to Newport Television, a broadcasting group established by Providence Equity Partners; the deal was completed on March 14, 2008.

Newport announced on July 19, 2012, that it would sell 12 of its stations, including WIVT and WBGH, to Nexstar Broadcasting Group. The sale was completed on December 3. On September 16, 2013, it was announced that Mission Broadcasting would acquire WICZ and low-power MyNetworkTV affiliate WBPN-LP from the Stainless Broadcasting Company subsidiary of Northwest Broadcasting. Upon the deal's completion, the stations' operations would have been taken over by Nexstar making them sisters to WIVT and WBGH. In March 2015, Mission's purchase of WICZ and WBPN was canceled; as a result, Stainless withdrew the license assignment applications on March 18.

== News operation ==
WIVT's News 34 logo.

For the most part, WIVT has been a non-factor in the local newscast race in Binghamton. It has spent most of its history as the third station in what was at one point essentially a two-station market (since it did not sign-on until November 1962). The outlet reaped virtually no benefit when the area's long-time NBC affiliate WICZ switched to Fox in 1996. Immediately after taking control, the Ackerley Group significantly upgraded WIVT's news department with the ability to share resources with WIXT's well-respected news department in Syracuse as well as the company's other television properties in Upstate New York.

WIVT's evening newscasts began to be simulcast on WBGH in 2000 after that station's acquisition by Ackerley. After the aforementioned tornado caused severe damage to its newly renovated studios, the station temporarily relocated to the facilities of WSKG-TV in Vestal while rebuilding on Ingraham Hill. However, the upgrades proved unsustainable and cuts began to be made as a result. Shortly before Clear Channel took over in June 2002, WIVT eliminated its weekday morning and midday newscasts.

On July 8, WIXT in Syracuse began producing a two-hour weekday morning show known as Daybreak. Airing from 5 until 7, the regional newscast (separate from WIXT and originating from a secondary set at its East Syracuse studios) was simulcasted on sister stations WWTI in Watertown and WUTR in Utica. The show included brief localized updates (focusing on Binghamton) twice an hour although most coverage was regional in nature with area-wide weather forecasts.

In 2003, WIVT dropped its weekend newscasts due to a loss of viewership. The station eventually closed down its local sports department in 2006 and at the same time reduced its 11 p.m. newscast to a short five-minute update. WIVT also began originating its early weeknight shows, featuring unique segments including exclusive musical performances, from secondary studios in the Oakdale Mall in Johnson City. Due to a lack of meteorologists (except for a lone weather anchor) based at WWTI, WIVT's forecasting personnel also produced most weather segments that were taped in advance for that station.

On June 5, 2009, WIVT and WBGH announced there would be a consolidation of news operations with sister station WETM-TV in Elmira after Newport Television made across the board cuts. WBNG reported all but two people from the news staff and all production personnel for the news department would be terminated. The Press & Sun-Bulletin later identified the two personnel remaining as news director Jim Ehmke and news anchor Peter Quinn but also said fifteen other members of the original 28 person staff, including non-news personnel, would remain based in Binghamton. The two stations would continue to be locally operated and maintain engineer staff at the studios on Ingraham Hill Road. WIVT and WBGH then began simulcasting WETM's newscasts with only regional weather coverage of the Eastern Twin Tiers.

A separate newscast specifically focusing on the Binghamton area was brought back to WIVT and WBGH on June 28, 2009, through a simulcast on both stations. This effort originally consisted of a 6 p.m. weeknight newscast entirely produced from WETM's studios in Elmira. Eventually, production of the news and sports portions of the broadcast shifted back to the WIVT and WBGH facility. These segments are recorded earlier in the day (usually by 5 o'clock) and feature locally based photojournalists in Binghamton. A repeat of the 6 o'clock newscast at 11 was subsequently added to the schedules of WIVT and WBGH. During the broadcast, WSYR-TV in Syracuse (the former WIXT) provides a local weather forecast (featuring rotating meteorologists) that is also recorded in advance. Soon after adding the hyper-local Binghamton news, WIVT ceased simulcasting WETM's newscasts making the taped weeknight newscast the only local news shown on the station. However, WBGH continued to air WETM's weekend 11 p.m. newscast until some point in late 2013.

=== Notable alumni ===
- Greg Kelly
- Jillian Mele

== Technical information ==
=== Subchannels ===
The station's signal is multiplexed:

Subchannels of WIVT
Subchannel	Res.	Short name	Programming
34.1	720p	WIVT-DT	ABC
34.2	720p	WBGH-HD	NBC (WBGH-CD)
34.3	480i	LAFF	Laff
34.4	480i	MYSTERY	Ion Mystery

Simulcast of subchannels of another station

Since WBGH operates as part of the WIVT twinstick, its second digital subchannel now carries WBGH in 720p high definition as of February 9, 2010. The official plan was to broadcast WBGH-CD in high definition in the future with the Federal Communications Commission (FCC) roll-out plan for low-power digital stations. The plan took effect when WBGH-CD flash cut to digital in August 2015.

=== Analog-to-digital conversion ===
WIVT shut down its analog signal, over UHF channel 34, after midnight on June 12, 2009, the official date on which full-power television stations in the United States transitioned from analog to digital broadcasts under federal mandate. The station's digital signal relocated from its pre-transition VHF channel 4 to UHF channel 34 for post-transition operations.
