= WBGH-CD =

Television station in Binghamton, New York

- Binghamton, New York; United States
- Channels: Digital: 20 (UHF); Virtual: 20
- Branding: NBC 5; News 34

Programming
- Affiliations: 20.1: NBC

Ownership
- Owner: Nexstar Media Group; (Nexstar Media Inc.)
- Sister stations: WIVT

History
- Founded: November 10, 1993
- First air date: April 25, 1996
- Former call signs: W08DL (1996–1997); WBGH-LP (1997–2001); WBGH-CA (2001–2015)
- Former channel number: Analog: 8 (VHF, 1996–2001), 20 (UHF, 2001–2015)
- Former affiliations: Independent (1996–1997)
- Call sign meaning: Binghamton

Technical information
- Licensing authority: FCC
- Facility ID: 15569
- Class: CD
- ERP: 0.04 kW
- HAAT: 203 m (666 ft)
- Transmitter coordinates: 42°3′39″N 75°56′35″W
- Translator(s): WIVT 34.2 Binghamton

Links
- Public license information: Public file; LMS
- Website: www.binghamtonhomepage.com

WBGH-CD (channel 20, cable channel 5) is a low-power, Class A television station in Binghamton, New York, United States, affiliated with NBC. It is owned by Nexstar Media Group alongside ABC affiliate WIVT (channel 34). The two stations share studios on Ingraham Hill Road in the town of Binghamton, where WBGH-CD's transmitter is also located.

Even though WBGH-CD transmits a digital signal of its own, its broadcast range is limited to the immediate Binghamton area. However, in order to serve the entire market, WBGH-CD has been carried in 720p high definition on WIVT's second digital subchannel since February 9, 2010. A direct-to-cable full 1080i HD feed of WBGH-CD/WIVT-DT2 is carried on Charter Spectrum channel 5 (hence the NBC 5 branding).

== History ==
The original construction permit for the station was granted on November 10, 1993, and issued the call sign W08DL, reflecting its facilities on VHF channel 8. W08DL applied for a license to cover the permit in July 1996 and was granted it on August 12.

In September 1995, WICZ-TV (channel 40), the market's longtime NBC station, announced that it would switch to Fox in the wake of similar affiliation switches in other parts of the country. Since the Binghamton market only had three full-powered commercial television stations at the time the affiliation switch was announced, it appeared that NBC would not have an affiliate in Binghamton once WICZ's contract with NBC expired. Time Warner Cable signed a local marketing agreement (LMA) with Elmira NBC affiliate WETM-TV to carry a cable-only Binghamton version of that station until a replacement NBC affiliate could be found. The cable channel (branded as "NBC 5 Binghamton") launched once WICZ switched to Fox in April 1996, displacing WNYW from cable systems in the region; under this arrangement, Time Warner Cable sold Binghamton-market advertising and replaced syndicated programs that aired on other Binghamton stations with programming acquired by WETM for the Binghamton market due to syndex laws, while WETM sold regional advertising seen in both markets.

W08DL changed its call letters to WBGH-LP on August 22, 1997; on October 23, original owner David Grant sold WBGH to Smith Broadcasting, owner of WETM, with plans to make channel 8 an over-the-air semi-satellite of WETM. As time went on, WBGH largely separated from the WETM partial simulcast but continued to air that station's newscasts.

In 2000, Smith Broadcasting sold WBGH-LP to the Ackerley Group of Seattle, Washington, which also entered into an LMA to take over operations of WETM. With this sale, WBGH's last ties with WETM were severed as Ackerley already owned WIVT (channel 34). WBGH moved its operations into WIVT's studios on Ingraham Hill south of Binghamton.

In 2001, the station upgraded to Class A status, moved to UHF channel 20 (to accommodate WICZ's digital signal on channel 8), and changed call letters to WBGH-CA. Ackerley merged with Clear Channel Communications on June 14, 2002. On April 20, 2007, the company entered into an agreement to sell its entire television stations group to Newport Television, a broadcasting group established by Providence Equity Partners; the deal was completed on March 14, 2008.

Former WBGH logo.

Newport announced on July 19, 2012, that it would sell twelve of its stations, including WBGH and WIVT, to Nexstar Broadcasting Group. The sale was finalized on December 3. On September 16, 2013, it was announced that Mission Broadcasting would acquire WICZ and low-power MyNetworkTV affiliate WBPN-LP from the Stainless Broadcasting Company subsidiary of Northwest Broadcasting. Upon the deal's completion, the stations' operations would have been taken over by Nexstar making them sisters to WBGH and WIVT. In March 2015, Mission's purchase of WICZ and WBPN was canceled; as a result, Stainless withdrew the license assignment applications on March 18.

== News operation ==
Throughout its entire existence, WBGH has never had its own news operation. In the late-1990s as a semi-satellite of WETM, it simulcast that station's local newscasts. After the sale to Ackerley in 2000, WIVT's weeknight newscasts began to be simulcast on WBGH. The early weeknight shows (from 5 to 6:30) eventually began originating from secondary studios in the Oakdale Mall in Johnson City featuring unique segments including exclusive musical performances.

On June 5, 2009, WBGH and WIVT announced there would be a consolidation of news operations with WETM after Newport Television made across the board cuts. WBNG reported all but two people from the news staff and all production personnel for the news department would be terminated. The Press & Sun-Bulletin later identified the two personnel remaining as news director Jim Ehmke and news anchor Peter Quinn but also said fifteen other members of the original 28 person staff, including non-news personnel, would remain based in Binghamton. The two stations would continue to be locally operated and maintain engineer staff at the studios on Ingraham Hill Road. WBGH and WIVT then began simulcasting WETM's newscasts with only regional weather coverage of the Eastern Twin Tiers.

A separate newscast specifically focusing on the Binghamton area was brought back to WBGH and WIVT on June 28, 2009, through a simulcast on both stations. This effort originally consisted of a 6 p.m. weeknight newscast entirely produced from WETM's studios in Elmira. Eventually, production of the news and sports portions of the broadcast shifted back to the Ingraham Hill Road facility. These segments are recorded earlier in the day (usually by 5 o'clock) and feature locally based photojournalists in Binghamton. A repeat of the 6 o'clock newscast at 11 was subsequently added to the schedules of WBGH and WIVT. During the broadcast, WSYR-TV in Syracuse provides a local weather forecast (featuring rotating meteorologists) that is also recorded in advance. Soon after adding the hyper-local Binghamton news, WIVT ceased simulcasting WETM's newscasts making the taped weeknight newscast the only local news shown on the station. However, WBGH continued to air WETM's weekend 11 p.m. newscast until some point in late 2013.

== Technical information ==
=== Subchannel ===
Subchannel of WBGH-CD
Channel	Res.	Short name	Programming
20.1	720p	WBGH-CD	NBC

=== Analog-to-digital conversion ===
WBGH shut down its analog signal, over UHF channel 20, in August 2015, and "flash cut" its digital signal into operation on UHF channel 20.

== See also ==
- Channel 5 branded TV stations in the United States
- Channel 20 low-power TV stations in the United States
