= WUCI-FM =

Radio station in Binghamton, New York

Binghamton, New York; United States
- Frequency: 91.5 MHz

Programming
- Format: Jazz

Ownership
- Owner: Uhuru Communications, Inc.

History
- First air date: August 31, 1986
- Last air date: June 1, 1990

Technical information
- Class: B1
- ERP: 630 watts
- HAAT: 241 m (791 ft)
- Transmitter coordinates: 42°3′21.73″N 75°56′37.72″W

WUCI-FM was a radio station that broadcast on 91.5 MHz FM in Binghamton, New York, United States. It was owned and operated by Uhuru Communications, Inc., and broadcast from 1986 to 1990. The station was a minority-owned community outlet that suffered from a series of deep factional conflicts and ultimately succumbed to financial problems.

== History ==
=== Building the dream ===
In 1982, a group known as Uhuru Communications formed, seeking to start a noncommercial radio station that would cater to the interests of minority listeners that were not served by either of Binghamton's two existing noncommercial stations, WSKG-FM and WHRW. The corporation was named by founder Ashimba Tariq for the Swahili word uhuru, meaning "freedom".

On December 20, 1984, the Federal Communications Commission granted Uhuru's application for a construction permit; by this time, the station was raising funds for operations, and it had moved into the former offices of WAAL on Hawley Street. Uhuru secured a federal grant in August 1985 to build what had been designated as WUCI-FM, by which time it was already broadcasting on the local cable system. The grant allowed Uhuru to carry out its original plan of siting the antenna with television station WICZ-TV.

Uhuru moved to new studios on Court Street in 1986 after securing better lease terms. WUCI-FM finally began broadcasting on August 31, 1986; the station aired a music format heavy on jazz and R&B music.

=== Civil war ===
In May 1987, the station spent five days off the air due to technical issues with the transmitter, but financial issues were also brewing at the fledgling WUCI-FM due to low community support. Two months later, on July 26, WUCI went silent again, this time with a warning from Tariq that it could one day be permanently off the air, as the station owed creditors. The silence lasted three days but inflamed a blooming power struggle over Tariq's management; during the time the station was off air, a dissident board attempted to fire Tariq, blaming him for putting Uhuru Communications into a $40,000 debt. Within a week of the station going off the air, the strife had developed into a full-on "mutiny", as an alternative board led by Frederick E. Smith attempted to oust Tariq and tried to get a locksmith to change the locks on the studio doors. Tariq began a dialogue with WSKG to explore potential operating arrangements under which WSKG would acquire WUCI's debt and broadcast facility, leaving Uhuru a production company.

The situation continued to deteriorate in August. Louis Ramos, a station staffer and supporter of Tariq, claimed he was threatened with a revolver by rival Smith after refusing to retract comments made to a newspaper reporter, resulting in a police investigation; Smith pleaded innocent to a charge of menacing, which would be dropped in 1989. After a temporary restraining order was issued against Tariq forbidding him from entering the WUCI-FM studios, on August 17, a new board of Smith supporters headed by Fred Johnson was announced and proclaimed itself the new leadership; Tariq refused to recognize it. The dispute was put on the back burner as the Johnson-led group sought to raise the necessary funds to put WUCI-FM back on the air. That faction soon developed a crack when the board removed Smith, prompting several disc jockeys to threaten a walkout. Later that month, Tariq was arrested on charges of possession of an illegal weapon and cocaine. That arrest led to a shocking revelation: Tariq had served a 10-year prison term in the maximum-security Attica Correctional Facility under the name Carl Jones and had been sought by New York state parole officials since 1981.

WUCI-FM's board attempted to turn the station around. In December, station manager Kingsley Hines vowed that it would return to the air in 1988, even though Johnson noted it could be three to five years before it could repay its creditors. The station resumed broadcasting but was shut down again on May 31, this time when New York State Electric & Gas shut off power to WUCI-FM, citing nonpayment; broadcasts resumed 11 days later after an Elks club helped raise the money necessary to pay the utility bill.

=== Demise ===
Despite launching a plea for listener support, the new management was able to keep the station running smoothly until June 1, 1990, when WUCI-FM was silenced again—this time by the repossession of its equipment to satisfy the debts of an unnamed creditor. Uhuru returned to the 1987 proposal that had been made by WSKG to merge and began to investigate the possibility of an alliance with the public broadcaster. However, negotiations collapsed in November because Uhuru wanted WSKG to assume liability to all of WUCI-FM's creditors; WSKG balked because Uhuru had no records to show to whom it owed money.

WUCI-FM's license came up for renewal in 1991, creating an opportunity for potential new bidders to offer competing station proposals for 91.5 FM in Binghamton. In 1992, the Federal Communications Commission designated WUCI-FM's renewal application for hearing alongside two such proposals, from Arrowhead Christian Center and WSKG. The two parties reached a settlement agreement that October, whereby WSKG paid $18,000 to Arrowhead, which changed its application to specify 90.1 MHz and thus be buildable alongside WSKG's proposed station.

The two resulting stations began broadcasting in 1995, with WSQX-FM, a jazz and news station from WSKG, on WUCI-FM's former frequency of 91.5 MHz and WJIK on 90.1 MHz, airing Christian music.
