= WBPN-LP =

Television station in Binghamton, New York

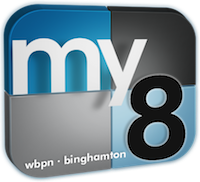
- Binghamton, New York; United States
- Channels: Analog: 10 (VHF); Digital: 28 (UHF, never built)
- Branding: My 8

Programming
- Affiliations: Independent (1996–2000); UPN (2000–2006); MyNetworkTV (2006–2021)

Ownership
- Owner: Cox Media Group; (Stainless Broadcasting, L.P.)
- Sister stations: WICZ-TV

History
- Founded: March 28, 1980
- First air date: May 17, 1996
- Last air date: June 15, 2021; (25 years, 29 days); (license canceled)
- Former call signs: W04BG (1996–1999); W10CO (1999–2000)
- Former channel numbers: Analog: 4 (VHF, 1996–1999)
- Call sign meaning: We're Binghamton's UPN (refers to former affiliation)

Technical information
- Licensing authority: FCC
- Facility ID: 74020
- Class: TX
- ERP: 0.004 kW
- HAAT: 263 m (863 ft)
- Transmitter coordinates: 42°3′22″N 75°56′38″W
- Translator(s): WICZ-TV 40.2 Binghamton

Links
- Public license information: LMS

WBPN-LP (channel 10) was a low-power television station in Binghamton, New York, United States, which operated from 1996 to 2021. In its later years, it was owned by Cox Media Group as an affiliate of MyNetworkTV; it had common ownership with Fox affiliate WICZ-TV (channel 40). WBPN-LP's operations were last housed at WICZ-TV's studios on Vestal Parkway East (NY 434) in Vestal; its transmitter was located on Ingraham Hill Road in the town of Binghamton.

WBPN-LP did not transmit a digital signal of its own, and there were never any plans to convert the station's signal to digital. In addition, due to its analog signal transmitting at an extremely low power, the station's broadcast range only included the immediate areas south of the Susquehanna River North Branch and did not even reach most of the city of Binghamton. However, in order to reach the entire market, WBPN-LP was simulcast on WICZ-TV's second digital subchannel (40.2), which eventually became its permanent over-the-air conduit. Ever since its inception, the WICZ-DT2 simulcast of WBPN-LP had been presented in 480i standard definition, with most programs (including the MyNetworkTV prime time schedule) airing in letterboxed 4:3; however, with improvements to WICZ-TV's multiplexer, it had been upgraded into 720p high definition.

Cox surrendered WBPN-LP's broadcast license to the Federal Communications Commission (FCC) for cancellation on June 15, 2021, ahead of the FCC-mandated July 13 shutdown of analog LPTV stations. The former WBPN-LP continues under WICZ-TV's license as "My 8" (referring to its channel position on most cable systems in the market).

== History ==
The station, as translator W10CO, was purchased by Northwest Broadcasting in 2000. At this point, the call sign became WBPN-LP after it upgraded to low-powered status. The channel assumed the market's UPN affiliation from WICZ which had been previously aired the network in a secondary manner since the late-1990s.

On September 16, 2013, it was announced Mission Broadcasting would acquire WBPN and WICZ from Northwest Broadcasting. Upon the deal's completion, the stations' operations would have been taken over by Nexstar Broadcasting Group making them sister stations to WIVT and WBGH-CD. Northwest withdrew the license assignment application on March 18, 2015, following the deal's cancellation.

The station had a pending application to air a low-power digital signal of its own on UHF channel 28 under the call sign WBPN-LD. This signal would not sign on, however. As stated above, WICZ-DT2 had served as WBPN-LP's digital signal since it did not operate one of its own. Ultimately, Cox Media Group would surrender WBPN-LP's license to the FCC on June 15, 2021, less than a month before the long-anticipated shutdown date for analog LPTV stations.

== See also ==
- Channel 8 branded TV stations in the United States
