= WSKG-TV =

Television station in Binghamton, New York

WSKG-TV and WSKA
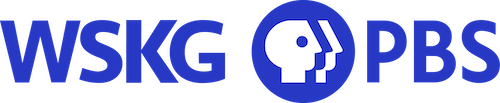

WSKG-TV: Binghamton, New York; WSKA: Corning–Elmira, New York; United States
- Channels for WSKG-TV: Digital: 31 (UHF); Virtual: 46
- Channels for WSKA: Digital: 25 (UHF); Virtual: 30
- Branding: WSKG PBS

Programming
- Affiliations: 46.1/30.1: PBS; for others, see § Technical information and subchannels

Ownership
- Owner: WSKG Public Telecommunications Council
- Sister stations: WSKG-FM, WSQX-FM

History
- First air date: WSKG-TV: May 12, 1968; WSKA: 2006
- Former call signs: WSKG-TV: WQTV (CP, 1952–1967); WSKG (1967–1979)
- Former channel number: WSKG-TV: Analog: 46 (UHF, 1968–2009); Digital: 42 (UHF, 2003–2019); WSKA: Digital: 30 (UHF, 2006–2019)
- Former affiliations: WSKG-TV: NET (1968–1970)
- Call sign meaning: WSKG-TV: Stanley Kiehl Gambell

Technical information
- Licensing authority: FCC
- Facility ID: WSKG-TV: 74034; WSKA: 78908
- ERP: WSKG-TV: 40.2 kW; WSKA: 50 kW
- HAAT: WSKG-TV: 408 m (1,339 ft); WSKA: 334 m (1,096 ft)
- Transmitter coordinates: WSKG-TV: 42.0609°N 75.9463°W; WSKA: 42°8′31.2″N 77°4′38.8″W

Links
- Public license information: WSKG-TV: Public file; LMS; WSKA: Public file; LMS
- Website: wskg.org

WSKG-TV (channel 46) is a PBS member television station in Binghamton, New York, United States, serving New York's Southern Tier. It is owned by the WSKG Public Telecommunications Council alongside NPR members WSKG-FM (89.3) and WSQX-FM (91.5). The three stations share studios on Gates Road in Vestal, New York; WSKG-TV's transmitter is located on Ingraham Hill in the town of Binghamton. WSKG is rebroadcast on a high-power satellite station, WSKA (channel 30), licensed to Corning and serving the western Twin Tiers from a transmitter on Higman Hill southwest of the town.

The New York State Department of Education's plans for educational television in New York state included a transmitter on channel 46 in Binghamton, and in 1952 the state obtained a construction permit for the facility. However, the network never received state funding. Meanwhile, in 1961, the Southern Tier Educational Television Association, a consortium representing local school districts, was chartered to provide educational programs for air on Binghamton's commercial stations. In 1966, it took over planning for its own educational station as well as the Department of Education permit.

WSKG-TV began broadcasting on May 12, 1968. It was named to honor a deceased local clergyman at the request of an anonymous donor. In constructing the facility, the original general management wildly overspent, leaving the station with more than a million dollars in debt and triggering a financial crisis in 1969. The station came days away from signing off the air but survived due to budgetary austerity, state support, and increased local giving. In 1975, WSKG-TV spawned WSKG-FM, the region's public radio station. In the 1970s, WSKG and local education officials built a large regional translator network, while the station began producing local newscasts, which were cut in 1981 as a drain on station resources. Between 1968 and 1989, the station operated from five different locations, including space in four different regional elementary schools, before acquiring and moving into its present site in Vestal.

In the 1990s, WSKG negotiated steep cuts in state funding that saw its subsidy decline by more than half from 1990 to 1996. Management responded by conducting two rounds of layoffs, closing most of the translators, and outsourcing many of the broadcaster's business operations. In the 2000s, WSKA was built to provide high-power public television to the Elmira–Corning area for the first time.

== History ==
=== Planning and construction ===
The construction permit for channel 46 was awarded by the Federal Communications Commission (FCC) to the New York State Department of Education on August 13, 1952, with the call sign WQTV. WQTV was projected as one of up to ten transmitters in the New York state educational television network. However, the state legislature never funded the network, leaving WQTV little more than a station on paper for more than 15 years. The Binghamton Press television column in December 1955 predicted that it would be a "long, long time" before channel 46 was in use.

On March 28, 1961, school administrators in the Triple Cities proposed a plan to begin educational television programming to be broadcast two days a week over commercial station WNBF-TV, which offered the use of its facilities for this purpose. The report also proposed the formation of the Southern Tier Educational Television Association (STETA) to manage the service. The first STETA programs were broadcast on October 24, 1961, to an estimated 50,000 students. For the 1962–63 school year, the organization offered 11 programs on WNBF-TV and WINR-TV. STETA programming later expanded to three channels after the debut of WBJA-TV.

In December 1964, Governor Nelson Rockefeller proposed to establish an educational TV network, with one of the four stations being at Harpur College (now Binghamton University); however, most of it would be used for closed-circuit telecasting, and no specific mention was made of activating the WQTV permit. In 1966, STETA took over planning to build the station, using federal grant money originally allocated to the state government and expanding its board of trustees to better reflect channel 46's planned coverage area. The new facility was proposed to connect Binghamton University and other institutions.

STETA leased facilities in the Vestal Plaza shopping center in Vestal; it received a $250,000 (equivalent to $1.84 million in 2025) equipment donation from CBS that secured its ability to build channel 46. Another gift, of $50,000 (equivalent to $367,884 in 2025) from an anonymous donor, led the station to change its call sign. The donor gave in memory of Dr. Stanley K. Gambell, a pastor of the local First Congregational Church who had died in a car crash the year before. Gambell had hosted the series Stories Retold on WNBF-TV from 1963 until 1966 and previously spent 10 years on the air at Philadelphia's WFIL-TV. In August, STETA filed to have the 15-year-old WQTV permit transferred to it from the state Department of Education. The FCC approved the change in November alongside plans for studios at Vestal Plaza and the Roberson Memorial Center. STETA then began a fund drive to raise money from the community, as well as construction on the transmitter facility and tower at Ingraham Hill.

=== Early years and financial trouble ===
WSKG-TV began broadcasting on May 12, 1968, having aired its first test pattern the day before. Nearly immediately, STETA was submerged in debt. By March 1969, the situation was so dire that the New York State Department of Education was reported to be taking over channel 46 and using it to rebroadcast WCNY-TV in Syracuse. The original general manager, Jerry R. Brown, resigned after just 10 months, and the board of trustees persuaded former local school superintendent William A. Anderson to step in at the troubled station. A day after being appointed, Anderson laid off 17 of STETA's 28 full- and part-time employees; two weeks later, he reached an agreement with electrical utility New York State Electric & Gas after it threatened to shut off power to channel 46. The station vacated its original studios in Vestal Plaza in favor of using empty space in the George Washington Elementary School in Binghamton; cut all local productions; and negotiated with its two largest creditors, tower constructor Stainless Inc. and equipment manufacturer RCA.

However, the withdrawal of support from the State University of New York system in connection with its University of the Air classes and an inability to secure a Ford Foundation grant caused the station to lose support it had been counting on. On April 22, Anderson declared, "Our only hope now is massive public support", revealing that he had been instructed by the board of trustees to take channel 46 off the air on April 26. However, the board granted a reprieve after the state legislature added funds for the station, dependent on matching funds in the local community, to its supplemental budget. The state Department of Education ordered an audit of the organization. When George Washington Elementary School closed in June 1969, the station moved yet again, this time to a three-room suite in the city's Woodrow Wilson Elementary School.

Even as it was revealed that the station was behind on paying withholding tax to the Internal Revenue Service, Anderson unveiled a plan to resolve WSKG's financial obligations—totaling $1.148 million (equivalent to $7.72 million in 2025)—to an audience of dozens of creditors in late June. STETA hired a fundraising firm to arrange a fund drive and auctioned off furnishings from its former Vestal Plaza studios. It paid off some of its obligations, while a number of smaller creditors forgave their debts. The board deadlocked on another proposal to shut down the station, leaving it to resume broadcasting for the 1969–70 school year.

In October, the Department of Education published details of its audit of STETA, but the audit only extended through June 30, 1968, whereas evidence indicated it was in late 1968 and early 1969 that spending had become excessive. Instead, it was details uncovered through other means that revealed the station's activity: an insurance claim on color television sets bought from RCA and the purchase of silver tea services and a color film processor. The station had paid for an animal mascot, a St. Bernard named Heidi; when they finally tried to use her in a program, she would not follow instructions and had to be sent to an obedience school in Buffalo. The expenses painted a picture of a station that had overbought on equipment and nearly doubled its budget to go on air; details around the color TV sets led to a state police probe. A Broome County grand jury indicted Brown on six counts of grand larceny in May 1970, but the indictment was tossed by a judge in 1973, as evidence in the Brown case was inconsistent with that provided by STETA in a lawsuit against its insurer.

=== Turnaround ===
Anderson left his role as chairman in December 1969 and was replaced by attorney Salvatore A. Fauci. Under Fauci, STETA made significant headway at reducing its debt, increased local giving, and began an annual on-air auction to raise funds. Within three years, channel 46 was profitable. It outgrew the Woodrow Wilson School site and moved to the former Hooper School in Endwell in the town of Union. The school also housed other community services, including a police substation and Meals on Wheels.

During the 1970s, WSKG expanded its television coverage and moved into radio. In 1973, it built a translator on Hawley Hill to extend its broadcast signal to the Elmira area; four years later, the Schuyler-Chemung-Tioga Board of Cooperative Educational Services constructed a six-transmitter network to further extend educational television service, and WSKG took over operation of a translator in Stamford. These were among the first in a network that included 52 translators by 1990. The main station doubled its effective radiated power in December 1979. WSKG-FM launched on October 22, 1975, bringing National Public Radio and classical music to the Southern Tier. With these expansions and additional viewers and listeners, as well as increasing programming costs, WSKG's budget swelled from $300,000 (equivalent to $1.52 million in 2025) to $1.3 million (equivalent to $5.03 million in 2025) between 1974 and 1978.

The station also expanded its local news coverage. In 1976, the station scrapped its existing current affairs program, Weekday, and began airing 7 and 11 p.m. local newscasts, known as WSKG News Center. The 11 p.m. newscast moved up to 10 p.m. later that year before returning to 11; weekend early evening newscasts were introduced in January 1980. The station reformatted its news programming as the market's first hour-long newscast, The Ten O'Clock Report, in August 1981.

=== Two studio moves in the 1980s ===
In 1981, WSKG began the process of moving facilities yet again, this time to the former Francis Donnelly Elementary School in Conklin. Costs for the move escalated from a bid of $200,000 (equivalent to $563,724 in 2025) to $1.3 million (equivalent to $3.66 million in 2025). The news department was cut back, then abolished, in 1982 as the station made cuts, bracing for expected reductions in federal support for public broadcasting. In canceling The Ten O'Clock Report, the station launched four new local programs to cover local news, arts, and sports coverage.

In 1986, STETA changed its name to the WSKG Public Telecommunications Council. That same year, enrollment increases in the Susquehanna Valley Central School District led to consideration of reverting the elementary school that WSKG leased back to use as a school. District officials and WSKG agreed to reopening the school's front wing to provide room for kindergarten classes even while WSKG was still operating from the site. In 1987, the district rejected an offer by WSKG to buy the school, leading the public broadcaster to begin a search for another new home. After rejecting a downtown site because it would require significant financial aid, the station bought the former Willow Point School in Vestal. This elementary school had closed a decade prior and was considered by WSKG as a possible site at that time. The station moved in the next year: the old cafeteria became the television control room, while the gymnasium was converted into the studio.

=== Cuts in the 1990s ===
In the 1990s, under governors Mario Cuomo and George Pataki, the New York state government made repeated deep cuts to its subsidies for public broadcasters. The first of these cuts, in 1991, threatened to reduce state funding by half and WSKG's total budget by 20 percent; the cuts were not as deep as feared, but they still led to the loss of 11 positions. In October, WSKG announced it would close 32 of its 53 translators; some were later leased to broadcast Fox network programming. Another round of cuts, in 1993, was aggravated for WSKG by the decision of IBM, a major Binghamton-area employer, to change its matching program for employee donations from a two-for-one to a dollar-for-dollar match. The 1993 cuts led to three more layoffs. Governor Pataki made more cuts to public broadcasting funding in 1996–97; in that year, WSKG received $722,800 (equivalent to $1.34 million in 2025), less than half of the $1.6 million (equivalent to $3.48 million in 2025) the stations received in 1990. In response, many key operating functions were subcontracted to other companies, including scheduling, bookkeeping, and part of its fundraising operation.

The station was featured in a 1992 episode of Where in the World Is Carmen Sandiego?, where the station was stolen by the character Wonder Rat. Vice president and general manager Michael Ziegler made a cameo in the episode. In 1998, when commercial station WIVT was severely damaged in a tornado, WSKG provided studio space for the station to resume newsgathering operations; WIVT remained there for several months until it could refurbish its facility atop Ingraham Hill. The year before, WSKG had contemplated acquiring the struggling station.

After 20 years as general manager, Michael Ziegler retired at the end of 1999. During his 20-year tenure, the WSKG stations enjoyed one of the highest membership renewal rates in public broadcasting and continued their radio expansion with new rebroadcasters for WSKG and WSQX-FM, a secondary service in Binghamton that began in 1995. Radio came to overshadow television within the WSKG operation; WSKG-FM became the most-listened-to radio station in Ithaca. At the same time, the payroll shrunk from 81 employees when he started to 37. In 1999, WSKG explored and opted against merging with WCNY-TV in Syracuse, in part to defray costs of converting to digital television. The two stations had already been collaborating; in 1996, WSKG started sharing WCNY's chief financial officer.

=== Digital conversion and Elmira–Corning expansion ===
WSKG applied for channel 30 in Corning in 1996. The Hawley Hill translator was turned off due to cost in 2003; the next year, WSKG received a $1.29 million (equivalent to $2.1 million in 2025) federal grant that allowed it to build a new, high-power digital TV station. WSKG completed its digital television conversion in 2006 and built the Corning station, WSKA, at that time.

Under Chris Sickora, who became the CEO of the stations in 2007, the station debuted its arts magazine, Expressions. Soon after, it executed another round of cost cuts in the late 2000s and early 2010s. Soon after arriving, he led a round of layoffs in response to further state budget cuts. Sickora also saw the station through the digital television transition; the station shut down its analog signal on the transition date of June 12, 2009, and continued to broadcast on its pre-transition physical channel 42. In 2013, WSKG teamed with other public TV stations in upstate New York to build a central master control facility in Syracuse. Sickora left in 2016 to run UNC-TV, the statewide PBS network in North Carolina; he was replaced by Greg Catlin, who left WBNG-TV after a 34-year career in which he served as news anchor and news director. Catlin retired in 2022; he was credited with restoring financial stability to the public broadcaster. He was replaced by Natasha Thompson, previously the president and CEO of the Food Bank of the Southern Tier; from 2018 to 2021, she had hosted a WSKG series on poverty, Chasing the Dream.

WSKG was available on cable in Ithaca—part of the Syracuse market—until 2018, when it was removed from the Spectrum cable lineup. Spectrum's move came despite disapproval from Tompkins County officials. In 2020, WSKG began offering in-market streaming in Tompkins and Cortland counties. WSKG-TV changed frequencies from channel 42 to 31 and WSKA from channel 30 to 25 on August 2, 2019, as a result of the 2016 United States wireless spectrum auction.

== Funding ==
In fiscal year 2024, WSKG-TV had total revenue of $3.409 million. The station had 4,983 members, who contributed $681,000. The Corporation for Public Broadcasting provided $1.07 million in the form of a Community Service Grant and other grants.

== Technical information and subchannels ==
Logo prior to 2018

WSKG-TV transmits from Ingraham Hill in the town of Binghamton. WSKA broadcasts from a tower on Higman Hill, southwest of Corning. Both stations carry the same subchannels:

Subchannels of WSKG-TV and WSKA
Subchannel		Res.	Short name		Programming
WSKG-TV	WSKA	Res.	WSKG-TV	WSKA	Programming
46.1	30.1	1080i	WSKG-HD	WSKA-HD	PBS
46.2	30.2	480i	WSKG-2	WSKA-2	PBS Kids
46.3	30.3	480i	WSKG-3	WSKA-3	Create
46.4	30.4	480i	WSKG-4	WSKA-4	World
