= WYOS =

Radio station in Binghamton, New York

Coordinates: 42°04′01″N 75°54′22″W

Binghamton, New York; United States
- Frequency: 1360 kHz
- Branding: CBS Sports Radio 1360

Programming
- Format: Sports
- Affiliations: CBS Sports Radio

Ownership
- Owner: Townsquare Media; (Townsquare License, LLC)
- Sister stations: WAAL, WHWK, WNBF, WWYL

History
- First air date: July 15, 1947 (as WKOP at 750)
- Last air date: December 28, 2022
- Former call signs: WKOP (1947–1985); WRSG (1985–1990); WBNK (1990–1992); WKOP (1992–2002)
- Former frequencies: 750 kHz (1947–1950)

Technical information
- Licensing authority: FCC
- Facility ID: 7921
- Class: B
- Power: 5,000 watts day; 500 watts night

Links
- Public license information: Public file; LMS

WYOS (1360 AM) was a radio station licensed to serve Binghamton, New York, United States, from 1947 to 2023. It was last owned by Townsquare Media.

The station went on the air as WKOP in 1947. It programmed various formats, including two separate stints as a country music station; in 2006, the station began airing sports radio programming, which it maintained until its 2022 shutdown.

== History ==
=== WKOP ===
On December 17, 1946, the Federal Communications Commission (FCC) granted a construction permit to The Binghamton Broadcasters, a group run by Andrew Jarema and Frank H. Altdoerffer, to start a new radio station on 750 kHz in Binghamton. It would operate with 1,000 watts during daytime hours only. The station made its debut as WKOP on July 15, 1947, from studios on the fourth floor of 34 Chenango Street; it was affiliated with the Mutual Broadcasting System. In order to broadcast at night, WKOP obtained a construction permit to move to 1360 kHz, with nighttime broadcasts at 500 watts, and moved there in June 1950. Daytime power increased to 5,000 watts in 1955. WKOP launched WKOP-FM, which initially aired Rural Radio Network programming, in 1954; it also expressed interest in television, but the FCC denied its bid to add VHF channel 7 to the market in 1952.

Jarema became the controlling shareholder in 1961 when he purchased another 45 percent in the company from Altdoerffer. By 1972, the station was established as a country music outlet.

In 1973, Jarema sold the station to Connecticut-based Royal Industrial Corporation, which in turn spun off the FM station, which became WAAL. Royal, however, missed payments on the purchase, and in October 1974, Jarema was appointed receiver and resumed management duties. Just days after his appointment, WKOP sustained damage when a fire was set in the Weeks and Dickinson music store in which it had been housed since its launch. The fire, it turned out, had a direct connection to the station: it had been started by a 21-year-old Johnson City man, Michael Fullman, who had briefly been a DJ as "Mike Eldredge" on WKOP in 1973. Fullman was convicted of arson and sentenced to three years in state prison.

Jarema was able to sell WKOP out of receivership to Southern Tier Broadcasters, Ltd., owned by Raymond Ross and Clark Cook, in 1977.

=== Solid gold and business ===
Southern Tier Broadcasters sold the station to the owners of WAAL, Regional Broadcasters Group, in 1981 after receiving what Ross called "an offer we couldn't refuse". Regional's ownership of WKOP was marked by changes in the Binghamton radio market. In 1982, WENE flipped to country and tried to make a run at WKOP; when rumors circulated that an FM station was about to join the format, WKOP decided to leave. On Christmas Day 1983, WKOP became oldies "K-Gold". Ratings were poor, and listeners continued to associate the WKOP call sign with country music, so in December 1985, the station tried to solve two problems at once: it adjusted its music mix and changed its calls to WRSG, for "Rock Solid Gold".

In the late 1980s, WRSG saw its ratings slide due to the adoption of an oldies format by an FM station. As a result, on October 29, 1990, the station flipped to a financial news format and adopted the call letters WBNK the next year. Advertising revenue remained steady, while ratings ticked up slightly, though not enough to pull the station from last place in the market.

=== Return to WKOP ===
In 1992, WBNK dropped its business format, returned to country music, and reclaimed the WKOP call letters.

Regional Broadcasting opted to sell all four of its radio stations in 1996 to Wicks Broadcasting, which divested itself of two stations but kept the Binghamton pair of WKOP and WAAL. Wicks already owned three stations in the Binghamton market.

The 16 Wicks radio stations were sold to Citadel Communications for $77 million in late 1998, by which time WKOP was airing an adult standards format. Citadel then filed to swap WKOP to Titus Broadcasting Systems in order to acquire that company's WINR a year later. The move was proposed as a swap of the two stations' frequencies, even though they aired the same programming; it never came to pass, with WINR being sold to Clear Channel Communications instead.

=== WYOS ===
The WYOS call letters and the oldies format that accompanied them moved to 1360 AM when Citadel relaunched 104.1 FM as WWYL "Wild 104", airing a contemporary hit radio format, in February 2002. The oldies format was discarded in 2005, when WYOS became a progressive talk station.

In November 2006, WYOS adopted a sports radio format, initially using programming from ESPN Radio. In 2012, Cumulus, which had acquired Citadel out of bankruptcy, transferred WYOS and its other Binghamton outlets to Townsquare Media as part of a 65-station swap. The following year, WYOS became an affiliate of the new CBS Sports Radio. As a CBS Sports Radio affiliate, WYOS' primary programming draws were the afternoon drive show co-hosted by Binghamton native Maggie Gray, and The Jim Rome Show.

Townsquare Media shut down WYOS on December 28, 2022, citing an "auxiliary transmitter failure". At the time of the shutdown, the station maintained a lower share of the Binghamton radio audience than WENE, the market's other sports radio station. Though Townsquare filed for special temporary authority to return the station to the air up to one year in the future, Townsquare also shut down the WYOS Web site, redirecting visitors to sister station WNBF. In a statement to the media, Townsquare's Binghamton cluster manager noted that WYOS was not selling nor airing local advertising at the time. The WYOS license was returned to the FCC on July 19, 2023, and cancelled on July 20. The shutdown would be a harbinger of Townsquare's future strategy of shutting down underperforming AM stations that would accelerate in 2025.
