= WSKG =

WSKG may refer to:

- WSKG-FM, a radio station (89.3 FM) licensed to Binghamton, New York, United States
- WSKG-TV, a television station (channel 31, virtual 46) licensed to Binghamton, New York, United States
- WSKG Public Telecommunications Council, the owner of WSKG-FM and WSKG-TV
