= WETM-TV =

Television station in Elmira, New York

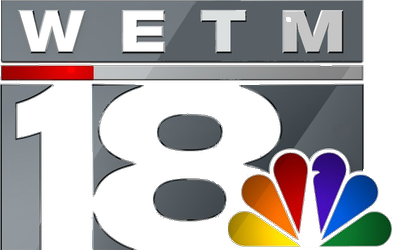

- Elmira–Corning, New York; United States
- City: Elmira, New York
- Channels: Digital: 23 (UHF); Virtual: 18
- Branding: WETM 18; 18 News; Twin Tiers CW 18.2

Programming
- Affiliations: 18.1: NBC; 18.2: The CW Plus; for others, see § Subchannels

Ownership
- Owner: Nexstar Media Group; (Nexstar Media Inc.)

History
- First air date: September 15, 1956
- Former call signs: WSYE-TV (1956–1980)
- Former channel numbers: Analog: 18 (UHF, 1956–2009); Digital: 2 (VHF, 2001–2009), 18 (UHF, 2009–2020)
- Former affiliations: UPN (18.2, 2004–2006); Independent (18.2, 2006–2020); Antenna TV (18.2, 2020–2025; now on 18.3)
- Call sign meaning: "Elmira/Times Mirror" (former owner)

Technical information
- Licensing authority: FCC
- Facility ID: 60653
- ERP: 265 kW
- HAAT: 375 m (1,230 ft)
- Transmitter coordinates: 42°6′22″N 76°52′16″W

Links
- Public license information: Public file; LMS
- Website: www.mytwintiers.com

WETM-TV (channel 18) is a television station in Elmira, New York, United States, affiliated with NBC and owned by Nexstar Media Group. Its second subchannel serves as an owned-and-operated station of The CW (via The CW Plus), as Nexstar owns a majority stake in the network. WETM-TV's studios are located on East Water Street in downtown Elmira, and its transmitter is located on Hawley Hill in Big Flats, New York.

== History ==
=== Prior use of channel 18 ===
The first user of channel 18 in Elmira was its second station, WECT, which was operated by El-Cor Television, a joint venture of the Corning Leader and the Elmira Star-Gazette. The station only operated for less than a year, from September 30, 1953, to May 27, 1954. El-Cor surrendered the station's license in September.

=== WSYE-TV ===
In late 1955, plans surfaced from two groups to reactivate channel 18 for use as a rebroadcaster of another station, one from Triangle Publications, owner of WNBF-TV of Binghamton, and one from the Newhouse group, owner of WSYR-TV of Syracuse. After WNBF-TV dropped its proposal at the end of November, WSYR-TV was granted the construction permit by the Federal Communications Commission on April 4, 1956, and broadcasting began on September 15 under the callsign WSYE-TV. The station telecast from the same Hawley Hill site used by WECT; like its parent, it was an NBC affiliate. While most programming came from Syracuse, the station did originate some programming from the Hawley Hill site.

In 1980, Newhouse sold its entire television division, including WSYR and WSYE, to the Times Mirror Company. The new owners changed the call letters to WSTM-TV and WETM-TV, respectively. Times Mirror gradually cut the last ties between the two stations while establishing WETM-TV as a full-fledged station in its own right. It sold WETM to Smith Broadcasting in 1986. Smith moved the station's studios and sales units to a more central facility in Elmira in 1988. Under Smith's ownership, a reversal of the station's origins took place with the April 1996 launch of a cable-only Binghamton version of WETM-TV (known as "NBC 5") through a local marketing agreement with Time Warner Cable, which would displace WNYW from cable systems in that area. Set up in the wake of WICZ-TV, Binghamton's established NBC affiliate, defecting to Fox, the arrangement saw Time Warner Cable sell Binghamton-market advertising and replace syndicated programs that aired on other Binghamton stations with programming acquired by WETM-TV for the Binghamton market due to syndex laws, while WETM-TV sold regional advertising seen in both markets. In 1997, Smith bought Binghamton low-power station WBGH-LP and made it an over-the-air semi-satellite of WETM-TV; WBGH eventually split off except for simulcasting WETM-TV's newscasts. WETM-TV became the first outlet in the Elmira market with an internet presence starting in 1998.

In 2000, Smith Broadcasting entered into a management agreement with The Ackerley Group to operate WETM-TV. Clear Channel Communications inherited the management agreement when it purchased Ackerley in late 2001. In 2004, Smith Broadcasting sold WETM-TV outright to Clear Channel after the death of Smith Broadcasting founder Robert Smith. On April 20, 2007, Clear Channel entered into an agreement to sell its entire television stations group to Providence Equity Partners. Newport announced on July 19, 2012, that it would sell twelve of its television stations (including WETM-TV) to Nexstar Broadcasting Group. The sale was finalized on December 3, 2012. On July 26, the station was knocked off the air by widespread power outages caused by a confirmed tornado that struck downtown Elmira during the afternoon. By the next day around mid-morning, WETM-TV had a feed restored to Time Warner Cable.

=== WETM2 ===
WETM's second subchannel has its roots in W30AA, a translator of PBS member station WSKG-TV in Binghamton. That station closed down the translator in 2003 after concluding the expenses required to operate W30AA were not justified by its limited viewership base. WSKG subsequently sold the W30AA license to Clear Channel, which brought it back on-the-air in September 2004 as UPN affiliate WTTX-LP (identified on-air as "UPN 30"). At this point, it began to be seen through a simulcast on WETM-TV's second digital subchannel, since its analog broadcasting radius was very limited. It replaced WWOR-TV of New York City on local cable systems.

With the September 2006 merger of UPN and The WB to form The CW, WTTX competed to become the area's affiliate. Ultimately, this went to cable-only WB 100+ station "WBE", which was operated by rival ABC affiliate WENY-TV. WTTX was dealt another blow when WSKG launched full-time satellite WSKA on the channel 30 allotment, forcing Clear Channel to shut down the low-power station; it never moved to another channel, and instead its programming became a subchannel of WETM-TV, known as "WETM2". It aired coverage of local high school sports, Elmira Jackals hockey, and New York Yankees baseball. The channel started airing Antenna TV programming in 2020.

The subchannel became an owned-and-operated station of The CW Plus at 6 a.m. on September 1, 2025. Antenna TV was shifted to 18.3, replacing Laff.

== News operation ==
WETM-TV has traditionally been a ratings stronghold in the Central Twin Tiers area. This is because the news department at rival WENY is quite small compared with WETM-TV. In addition, WENY does not provide any newscasts in several traditional timeslots (such as a midday broadcast during the week, weeknights at 5, and weekends) despite operating three major broadcast networks (ABC, CBS, and The CW+).

While serving as a semi-satellite of WSTM, WETM-TV produced separate local newscasts that were seen weeknights at 6 and 11 from its original Hawley Hill studios. There were also weekday morning news and weather cut-ins (airing at :25 and :55 past the hour) during Today (airing from 7 to 9 a.m.). The 2004 launch of WETM-DT2/WTTX-LP introduced the area's first prime time newscast at 10 which is still seen for thirty minutes on weeknights. WETM 18 News at 10 currently competes with another half-hour newscast airing on Fox affiliate WYDC, channel 48 (which is taped in advance). WETM-DT2 formerly simulcast the newscasts from the main channel before becoming an Antenna TV affiliate.

On June 5, 2009, WIVT and WBGH in Binghamton announced there would be a consolidation of news operations with WETM-TV after Newport Television made across the board cuts. However, those two stations would continue to be locally operated and maintain engineer staff at their own studios in Binghamton. WIVT and WBGH began simulcasting WETM's newscasts with only regional weather coverage of the Eastern Twin Tiers and not much of a news focus. A separate newscast, specifically focusing on the Binghamton area, was brought back to those two stations on June 28, 2009, through a simulcast on both outlets. This effort originally consisted of a 6 p.m. weeknight newscast entirely produced from WETM's studios.

Eventually, production of the news and sports portions of the broadcast was shifted back to Binghamton. These segments are recorded earlier in the day (usually by 5 p.m.) and feature locally based photojournalists. A repeat of the 6 p.m. newscast at 11 p.m. was subsequently added to the schedules of WIVT and WBGH. Soon after adding the hyper-local Binghamton news, WIVT ceased simulcasting WETM's newscasts making the taped weeknight program the only local news shown on the station. However, WBGH continued to air WETM's weekend 11 p.m. newscast until at some point in late 2013. WETM upgraded its local newscast production to high definition level on July 15, 2014. It is the second television station in the market to perform the change as rival WENY switched on April 23, 2012.

=== Notable former staff ===
- Rod Denson
- Jericka Duncan
- Ken Rosato

== Technical information ==
=== Subchannels ===
The station's signal is multiplexed:

Subchannels of WETM-TV
Subchannel	Res.	Short name	Programming
18.1	720p	WETM-TV	NBC
18.2	720p	CW18	The CW Plus
18.3	480i	Antenna	Antenna TV
18.4	480i	MYSTERY	Ion Mystery

=== Analog-to-digital conversion ===
WETM-TV became the first station in Elmira to broadcast a high definition feed in 2001 with the launch of a digital signal on VHF channel 2. The station shut down its analog signal, over UHF channel 18, at 12:01 a.m. on June 12, 2009, the official date on which full-power television stations in the United States transitioned from analog to digital broadcasts under federal mandate. The station's digital signal relocated from its pre-transition VHF channel 2 to UHF channel 18.

== See also ==
- Channel 23 digital TV stations in the United States
- Channel 18 virtual TV stations in the United States
