= WMTT =

WMTT may refer to:

- WMTT-FM, a radio station (94.7 FM) in Tioga, Pennsylvania
- WPGO, a radio station (820 AM) in Horseheads, New York, which held the call sign WMTT from 2020 to 2021
- WCID, a radio station (100.9 FM) in Horseheads, New York, which held the call sign WMTT-FM from 2020 to 2021
- WTHK, a radio station (100.7 FM) in Wilmington, Vermont, which held the call sign WMTT from 1999 to 2000
- WVIP (FM), a radio station (100.5 FM) in Susquehanna, Pennsylvania, which held the call sign WMTT from 1995 to 1996
- WNPX-TV, a television station (channel 28) in Franklin, Tennessee, which held the call sign WMTT from 1989 to 1993
- WRIO, a radio station (101.1 FM) in Ponce, Puerto Rico, which held the call sign WMTT from 1983 to 1986
