= Channel 8 branded TV stations in the United States =

The following television stations in the United States brand as channel 8 (though neither using virtual channel 8 nor broadcasting on physical RF channel 8):

- WICZ-DT2 in Binghamton, New York
- WDAY-DT2 in Fargo, North Dakota
- WTOK-DT3 in Meridian, Mississippi

The following stations, which are no longer broadcasting, formerly branded as channel 8:

- WBPN-LP in Binghamton, New York
