= Ingraham Hill =

Mountain in the Southern Tier of New York

- Location within New York Adirondack Park Location within the United States

Highest point
- Elevation: 1,824 feet (556 m)
- Coordinates: 42°03′42″N 75°57′04″W

Geography
- Location: SSW of Binghamton, Broome County, New York, U.S.
- Topo map: USGS Binghamton West

Ingraham Hill is a mountain in the Southern Tier of New York. It is located south-southwest of Binghamton in Broome County. The mountain contains the television and radio broadcast towers for the surrounding metropolitan area. The summit rises to an elevation of 1,824 feet (556 m). These towers include TV stations WBNG, WICZ, WIVT, WSKG-TV and radio stations WNBF, WAAL, WWYL WLTB and many more. The towers are visible throughout the region.

== History ==
In 1950, the Conservation Department built an 80-foot-tall (24 m) Aermotor LS40 steel fire lookout tower on the mountain. The tower was placed into service in 1951, reporting 6 fires and 39 visitors. Due to the increased use of aerial detection, the tower ceased fire lookout operations at the end of the 1970 fire lookout season. Sometime in the 1970s, the tower was sold to a local communications company, which removed the tower cab for use as a communications antenna tower. The tower was removed in the Fall of 2016, and the site is not open to the public.
