= WVIP =

WVIP may refer to:

- WVIP (FM), a radio station (100.5 FM) licensed to Susquehanna, Pennsylvania, United States
- WNVU (FM), a radio station (93.5 FM) licensed to New Rochelle, New York, which used the WVIP-FM call sign in 2006, and the WVIP call sign from 2006 to 2023
- WRVP, a radio station (1310 AM) licensed to Mount Kisco, New York, which used the WVIP call sign from 1957 to 2006
- WYMK, a radio station (106.3 FM) licensed to Mount Kisco, New York, which used the WVIP-FM call sign from 1963 to 1993
