= WCDW =

- Port Dickinson, New York; United States
- Broadcast area: Greater Binghamton
- Frequency: 106.7 MHz (HD Radio)
- Branding: COOL 106.7

Programming
- Language: English
- Format: Classic hits
- Subchannels: HD2: 95.1 The Drive (Alternative rock); HD3: Hot 92.9 (Rhythmic CHR); HD4: The Bear 107.1 (Classic country)

Ownership
- Owner: Equinox Broadcasting
- Sister stations: WVIP

History
- First air date: 2006
- Former call signs: WRRQ (2006–2013)

Technical information
- Licensing authority: FCC
- Facility ID: 165347
- Class: A
- ERP: 1,200 watts
- HAAT: 221 meters (725 ft)
- Transmitter coordinates: 42°3′22.3″N 75°56′37.7″W
- Translator: See § Translators

Links
- Public license information: Public file; LMS
- Webcast: Listen live; HD2: Listen live; HD3: Listen live; HD4: Listen live
- Website: www.coolesthits.com; HD2: www.binghamtondrive.com; HD3: www.hot929.com; HD4: thebear1071.com

WCDW (106.7 FM) is a commercial radio station licensed to Port Dickinson, New York, United States, and serving the Greater Binghamton market. The station is owned by Equinox Broadcasting and broadcasts a classic hits format as "Cool 106.7".

The station's transmitter is in the Ingraham Hill tower farm, south of Binghamton. It also has FM translators at 101.1 in Endwell, New York (relays the main station), 95.1 in Binghamton (relays HD2), 92.9 in Endicott, New York (relays HD3), and 107.1 in Johnson City, New York (relays HD4).

== History ==
The station signed on the air in October 2006. The original call sign was WRRQ ("Q107"). Owned by Equinox Broadcasting, it paired up with an oldies station, WCDW Cool 100, from studios on Upper Court Street in the city of Binghamton. The station ran automated, without any regular on-air staff for several months.

Q107 began broadcasting the local AHL hockey team, the Binghamton Senators, for the 2006-07 season. Justin (Case) MacGregor became the station's first on-air personality, hosting a live pregame show called "Hockey Night In Binghamton" prior to every Saturday night home game. The Senators did not return to the station for the 2007-08 season.

In February 2007, Tejay Schwartz, a veteran of the Binghamton radio market, became the first morning drive time DJ on Q107. He was joined a month later by radio veterans Steve Shimer (Shimes) on middays and Justin (Case) MacGregor on afternoon drive. In September 2007, Q107 added a contemporary Christian rock show on Sunday mornings from 7 till 9 am.

In December 2007, Tejay left the lineup to rejoin a station across town. Justin shifted to morning drive while Amy Love was added for afternoon drive.

In October 2008, the schedule adjusted again, as Thunder Reynolds joined the staff from crosstown station WAAL for afternoons from 1-4pm. Also added was Josh Evans, who hosted nights from 9 pm till midnight.

Q106.7's format was a blend of up-tempo hits of the 1980s, 1990s and 2000s, using the slogan "The 80's And More".

On June 18, 2013, WRRQ switched to a simulcast of classic hits-formatted WCDW 100.5 FM.

On August 16, 2013, WRRQ changed its call letters to WCDW, after 100.5-FM changed its call sign to WDRE, flipping to Alternative Rock.

WCDW is part of the Southern Tier Radio Network, which includes 100.5 The Drive (WVIP) and 95 The Met (WMTT) in Elmira.

On February 2, 2022, WCDW's HD4 subchannel changed its format from soft adult contemporary as "Sunny 107.1" to classic country as "107.1 The Bear".

== Translators ==
Broadcast translators for WCDW
Call sign	Frequency	City of license	FID	ERP (W)	HAAT	Class	FCC info	Notes
W225BC	92.9 FM	Endicott, New York	156937	175	220 m (722 ft)	D	LMS	relays HD3
W236AP	95.1 FM	Binghamton, New York	141559	99	178 m (584 ft)	D	LMS	relays HD2
W266BK	101.1 FM	Endwell, New York	153459	14	62 m (203 ft)	D	LMS	relays FM/HD1
W296BS	107.1 FM	Johnson City, New York	141544	250	285 m (935 ft)	D	LMS	relays HD4
