= WIOX =

- Roxbury, New York; United States
- Broadcast area: Catskill Mountains–Delaware County, New York
- Frequency: 91.3 MHz

Programming
- Format: Variety

Ownership
- Owner: WIOX, Inc.
- Sister stations: WSKG-FM, WSQX-FM

History
- First air date: 2010; 16 years ago

Technical information
- Licensing authority: FCC
- Facility ID: 172638
- Class: A
- ERP: 3,300 watts
- HAAT: −183 meters (−600 ft)
- Transmitter coordinates: 42°16′13″N 74°34′16″W

Links
- Public license information: Public file; LMS
- Webcast: Listen Live
- Website: wioxradio.org

WIOX (91.3 FM) is a community radio station licensed to Roxbury, New York, and serving Delaware County and the Catskill Mountains region.

== History ==
Originally licensed to the Town of Roxbury, WIOX received its initial construction permit from the Federal Communications Commission on May 7, 2008. The new station was assigned the WIOX call sign by the FCC on May 14, 2008. The station received its license to cover from the FCC on September 23, 2010. In 2014, the WSKG Public Telecommunications Council became the licensee of WIOX. The station's license was transferred to WIOX, Inc. effective May 8, 2018, for $1.
