= Old Hawleyton Methodist Episcopal Church =

Historic church in New York, United States

- U.S. National Register of Historic Places
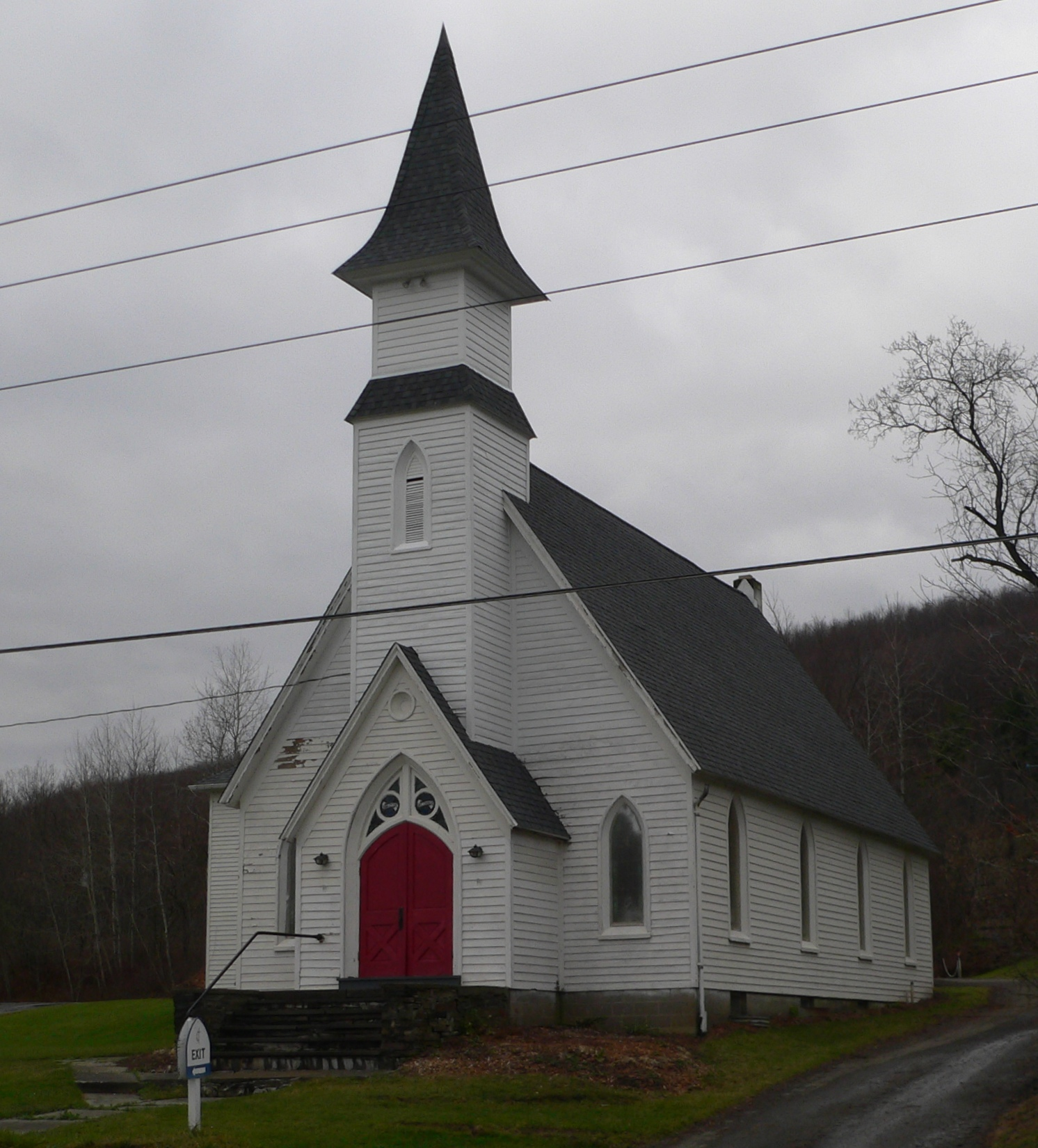
- Old Hawleyton United Methodist Episcopal Church, November 2011

- Location within New York Location within the United States
- Location: 923 Hawleyton Rd., Hawleyton, New York
- Coordinates: 42°1′8″N 75°55′0″W
- Area: 1 acre (0.40 ha)
- Built: 1857
- Architect: Stearns, Edwin
- Architectural style: Gothic Revival
- NRHP reference No.: 06000893
- Added to NRHP: September 28, 2006

Old Hawleyton Methodist Episcopal Church is a historic Methodist Episcopal church located at Hawleyton in Broome County, New York. It was constructed in 1856-1857 and altered in 1877 and 1942; the attached Fellowship Hall was constructed in two stages between 1950 and 1954. The original structure was built as a small rectangular wood-frame building characterized by a steep gable roof with deeply hanging overhanging eaves in a rural Gothic Revival style. It was listed on the National Register of Historic Places in 2006.
