= WVIP (FM) =

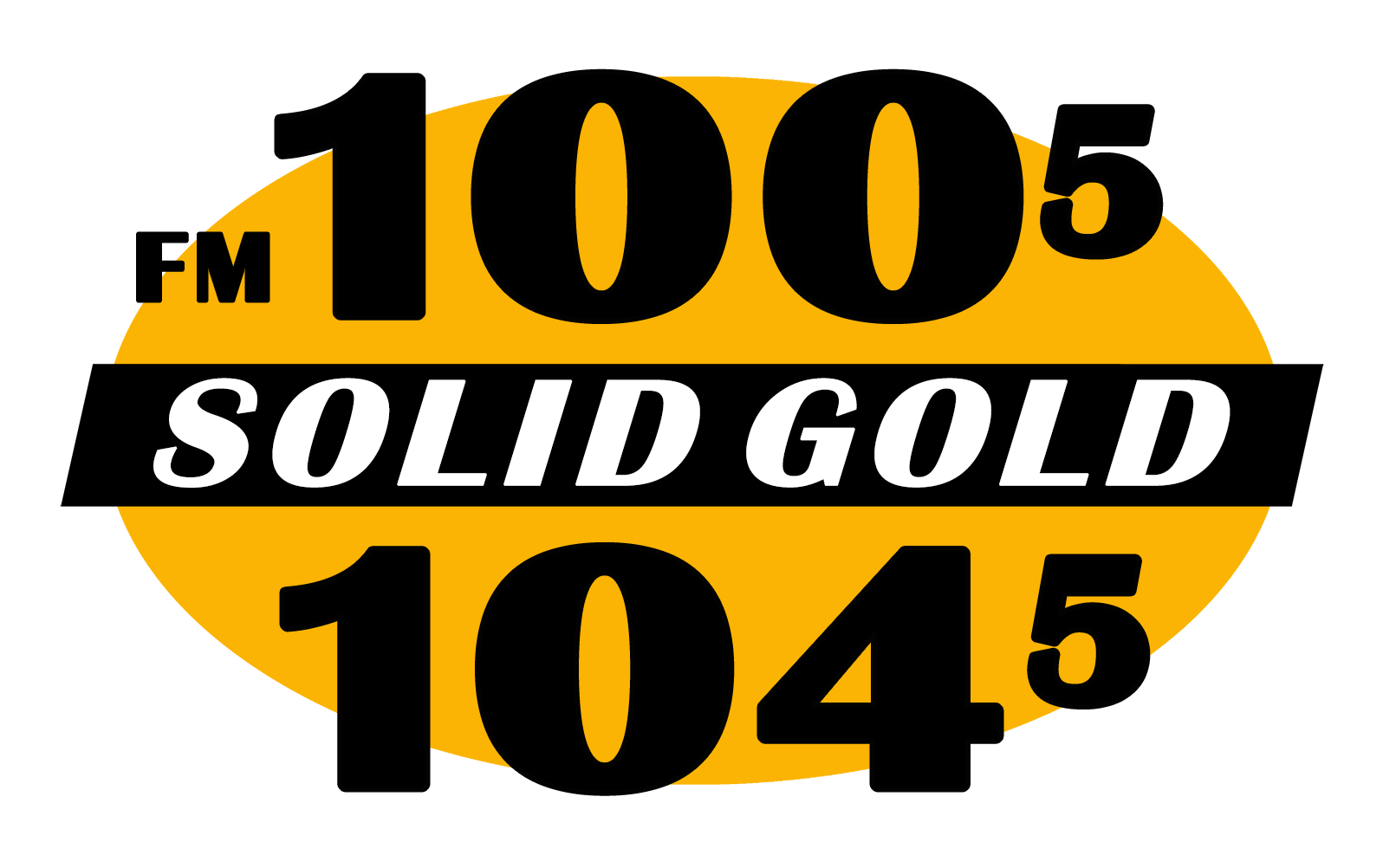
- Susquehanna, Pennsylvania; United States
- Broadcast area: Binghamton metropolitan area
- Frequency: 100.5 MHz (HD Radio)
- Branding: SolidGold 100.5 & 104.5

Programming
- Language: English
- Format: Oldies
- Affiliations: Buffalo Bills Radio Network

Ownership
- Owner: Equinox Broadcasting Corporation
- Sister stations: WCDW

History
- First air date: July 2, 1992; 34 years ago
- Former call signs: WXEJ (1992–1995); WMTT (1995–1996); WCDW (1996–2013); WDRE (2013–2025); WVYP (2025)

Technical information
- Licensing authority: FCC
- Facility ID: 19668
- Class: A
- ERP: 1,600 watts
- HAAT: 196 meters (643 ft)
- Transmitter coordinates: 42°3′10.00″N 75°42′7.00″W
- Translator: (104.5 MHz) W283AG (Binghamton, New York)

Links
- Public license information: Public file; LMS
- Webcast: Listen live
- Website: binghamtonoldies.com

WVIP (100.5 MHz, "Solid Gold 100.5 & 104.5") is a commercial FM radio station licensed to Susquehanna, Pennsylvania, and serving the Binghamton metropolitan area. It airs an oldies radio format. WVIP is owned by the Equinox Broadcasting Corporation. In the fall, WVIP carries Buffalo Bills football. Its studios are on Main Street in Johnson City.

WVIP is a Class A station. It has an effective radiated power (ERP) of 1,600 watts. The station's transmitter is on Anne Road at Sugarbush Road in Windsor, New York.

== History ==
From 1947 to 1952, 100.5 MHz was the frequency used by WNBF-FM. It was sister station to WNBF, the first radio station in the Binghamton area. In that era few people owned FM radio receivers, and management saw little opportunity to make it profitable, so the station was taken silent. In 1956, WNBF-FM returned to the air, moving to 98.1 MHz (currently WHWK). The 100.5 allocation in the eastern Twin Tiers remained silent for the next 40 years.

The current station on 100.5 signed on the air as WXEJ on July 2, 1992. On April 14, 1995, the station changed its call sign to WMTT, and on April 8, 1996, to WCDW.

On August 16, 2013, WCDW changed its call letters to WDRE, and also changed formats from oldies, back to alternative rock.

On January 1, 2024, WDRE changed its format from alternative rock (which moved to the WCDW-HD2 subchannel) to oldies, branded as "Solid Gold 100.5/104.5"

WDRE changed its call sign to WVYP on January 19, 2025, and to WVIP on January 28.
