= Channel 18 virtual TV stations in the United States =

The following television stations operate on virtual channel 18 in the United States:

- K04BJ-D in La Pine, Oregon
- K06GW-D in New Castle, Colorado
- K08OX-D in Thomasville, Colorado
- K09PJ-D in Ouray, Colorado
- K11PS-D in Collbran, Colorado
- K11RX-D in Big Arm, Montana
- K13SN-D in Nucla, Colorado
- K17OS-D in Laredo, Texas
- K18BN-D in Glasgow, Montana
- K18DD-D in Camp Verde, Arizona
- K18DG-D in Alexandria, Minnesota
- K18GF-D in Little Falls, Minnesota
- K18HD-D in Bakersfield, California
- K18HQ-D in Sandpoint, Idaho
- K18KK-D in Columbia, Missouri
- K18NE-D in St. James, Minnesota
- K18NO-D in Lubbock, Texas
- K18NW-D in Minot, North Dakota
- K19HG-D in Redstone, Colorado
- K20JB-D in Hollis, Oklahoma
- K20OE-D in Silt, Colorado
- K21PE-D in Tyler, Texas
- K24JO-D in Crawford, Colorado
- K24MV-D in Fort Peck, Montana
- K25PC-D in Gateway, Colorado
- K26LH-D in Snowmass Village, Colorado
- K26ON-D in Deer Lodge, etc., Montana
- K27OV-D in Woody Creek, Colorado
- K28HA-D in Grand Valley, Colorado
- K31CW-D in Carbondale, Colorado
- K31IW-D in Ridgway, Colorado
- K31NS-D in Fort Peck, Montana
- K32CW-D in Montrose, Colorado
- K32HL-D in Rulison, Colorado
- K32IC-D in Altus, Oklahoma
- K32NO-D in Glenwood Springs, Colorado
- K33HG-D in Quanah, Texas
- K33PB-D in Grand Junction, Colorado
- K35NS-D in Montrose, Colorado
- K35ON-D in Paonia, Colorado
- K36GX-D in Basalt, Colorado
- K36JZ-D in Roseburg, Oregon
- K43HD-D in Quanah, Texas
- KAJJ-CD in Kalispell, Montana
- KCEI-LD in Taos, New Mexico
- KCWH-LD in Lincoln, Nebraska
- KDKZ-LD in Farmington, Missouri
- KDOV-LD in Medford, Oregon
- KGSW-LD in Keene, Texas
- KHMP-LD in Las Vegas, Nevada
- KJTL in Wichita Falls, Texas
- KLJB in Davenport, Iowa
- KLRU in Austin, Texas
- KLTL-TV in Lake Charles, Louisiana
- KOHD in Bend, Oregon
- KPFW-LD in Dallas, Texas
- KPTF-DT in Farwell, Texas
- KQRM-LD in Petaluma, California
- KRMJ in Grand Junction, Colorado
- KSCI in Long Beach, California
- KTEW-LD in Ponca City, Oklahoma
- KTTU in Tucson, Arizona
- KTVV-LD in Hot Springs, Arkansas
- KUEW in St. George, Utah
- KUPB in Midland, Texas
- KVPT in Fresno, California
- KWYB in Butte, Montana
- KXCY-LD in Cheyenne, Wyoming
- KXDP-LD in Denver, Colorado
- KZCS-LD in Colorado Springs, Colorado
- W18BB-D in Elizabeth City, North Carolina
- W18DZ-D in Ceiba, Puerto Rico
- W18EV-D in New Bern, North Carolina
- W18EW-D in Jackson, Tennessee
- W18FB-D in Sutton, West Virginia
- W22FC-D in Greenville, North Carolina
- W25FP-D in Young Harris, Georgia
- W27DF-D in Quincy, Illinois
- W32EV-D in Adamsville, Tennessee
- W34FH-D in Marion, etc., North Carolina
- W34FL-D in Harrisburg/Lancaster, Pennsylvania
- WBGR-LD in Bangor/Dedham, Maine
- WBXC-CD in Champaign/Urbana, Illinois
- WBXN-CD in New Orleans, Louisiana
- WCCB in Charlotte, North Carolina
- WDFL-LD in Miami, Florida
- WDHN in Dothan, Alabama
- WDPM-DT in Mobile, Alabama
- WDWO-CD in Detroit, Michigan
- WECN in Naranjito, Puerto Rico
- WEID-LD in South Bend, Indiana
- WETM-TV in Elmira, New York
- WHIZ-TV in Zanesville, Ohio
- WHTV-LD in New York, New York
- WJTS-CD in Jasper, Indiana
- WKCF in Clermont, Florida
- WLCN-CD in Charleston, South Carolina
- WLEX-TV in Lexington, Kentucky
- WLFI-TV in Lafayette, Indiana
- WLHA-LD in Laurel, Mississippi
- WMAV-TV in Oxford, Mississippi
- WNGH-TV in Chatsworth, Georgia
- WNPI-DT in Norwood, New York
- WQMK-LD in Cusseta, Alabama
- WQOW in Eau Claire, Wisconsin
- WSTN-LD in Isabela-Mayaguez, Puerto Rico
- WSVT-LD in Tampa, Florida
- WTCV in San Juan, Puerto Rico
- WUHO-LD in Kalamazoo, Michigan
- WUJX-LD in Jacksonville, Florida
- WUVN in Hartford, Connecticut
- WVEO in Aguadilla, Puerto Rico
- WVTV in Milwaukee, Wisconsin
- WVVH-CD in Southampton, New York
- WXTM-LD in Erie, Pennsylvania

The following stations, which are no longer licensed, formerly operated on virtual channel 18 in the United States:

- K06HU-D in Aspen, Colorado
- K18IW-D in Rapid City, South Dakota
- KEGG-LD in Tulsa, Oklahoma
- KJVG-LD in Joplin, Missouri
- KTWN-LD in Little Rock, Arkansas
- WADA-LD in Wilmington, North Carolina
- WHNW-LD in Gary, Indiana
- WHTV in Jackson, Michigan
- WURO-LD in Roscommon, Michigan
