= WWYL =

Coordinates: 42.058°N 75.954°W

- Chenango Bridge, New York; United States
- Broadcast area: Binghamton, New York
- Frequency: 104.1 MHz (HD Radio)
- Branding: KISS 104.1

Programming
- Format: Top 40 (CHR)
- Affiliations: Compass Media Networks

Ownership
- Owner: Townsquare Media; (Townsquare License, LLC)
- Sister stations: WAAL, WHWK, WNBF

History
- First air date: July 1, 1996 (as WYOS)
- Former call signs: WETR-FM (1995, CP); WANG (1995–1996, CP); WYOS (1996–2002)
- Call sign meaning: "Wild" (previous branding)

Technical information
- Licensing authority: FCC
- Facility ID: 7663
- Class: A
- ERP: 930 watts
- HAAT: 254 meters (833 ft)

Links
- Public license information: Public file; LMS
- Webcast: Listen Live
- Website: kissbinghamton.com

WWYL (104.1 FM, branded as KISS 104.1) is a radio station serving Binghamton, New York with a top 40 (CHR) format. This station is under the ownership of Townsquare Media.

The station signed on July 1, 1996, as WYOS, an oldies station. It became WWYL in 2002, after changing to a top 40 format as "Wild 104.1"; the WYOS call sign and oldies format moved to 1360 AM. It rebranded as "Kiss 104.1" in 2019.

== Previous logos ==
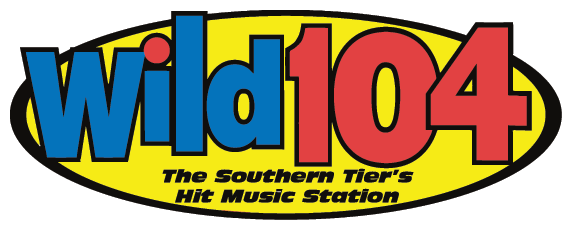
