= WHWK =

Radio station in Binghamton, New York

Coordinates: 42.061°N 75.945°W

- Binghamton, New York; United States
- Broadcast area: Southern Tier
- Frequency: 98.1 MHz
- Branding: 98.1 The Hawk

Programming
- Format: Country
- Affiliations: Compass Media Networks; Westwood One

Ownership
- Owner: Townsquare Media; (Townsquare License, LLC)
- Sister stations: WAAL; WNBF; WWYL

History
- First air date: January 1956
- Former call signs: WNBF-FM (1956–1972); WQYT (1972–1983)
- Call sign meaning: "Hawk"

Technical information
- Facility ID: 72373
- Class: B
- ERP: 6,700 watts
- HAAT: 395 meters (1,296 ft)

Links
- Webcast: Listen live
- Website: 981thehawk.com

WHWK (98.1 FM "The Hawk") is a commercial radio station in Binghamton, New York. It carries a country music radio format and is owned by Townsquare Media. Local disc jockeys are heard during the day on weekdays. Two syndicated shows are heard after 7 p.m.: Taste of Country Nights from Compass Media Networks, hosted by Evan Paul, and The Third Shift from Westwood One heard overnights. Current local staff include Glenn Pitcher, Traci Taylor, Jess Rose, and Chrissy. It is regularly the highest ranking station in the Nielson ratings in the Binghamton radio market.

WHWK has an effective radiated power of 6,700 watts. The transmitter is off Ingraham Hill Road in Binghamton, amid the towers for other FM and TV stations in the region.

When streamed, commercials which are heard on the radio signal are replaced on the internet stream for nationally and regionally sponsored ads, and a few public service announcements.

== History ==
In January 1956, the station first signed on as WNBF-FM. It was co-owned with WNBF (1290 AM) and WNBF-TV (channel 12), which had operated a previous WNBF-FM on various frequencies (among them 100.5) from 1940 to 1952. The owner was Triangle Publications, which also put out the weekly magazine TV Guide. At first, WNBF-FM simulcast the programming on the AM station.

In the 1960s, WNBF-FM switched to its own beautiful music format. It played quarter hour sweeps of mostly instrumental cover versions of popular songs, as well as Broadway and Hollywood show tunes.

In 1972, as part of Triangle's dismantling, Stoner Broadcasting, based in Des Moines, bought WNBF-AM-FM. At the same time, Gateway Communications, the publisher of The Record of Bergen County, New Jersey, bought WNBF-TV (now WBNG-TV). Also in 1972, WNBF-FM changed its call sign to WQYT, representing its "quiet" format. In the 1980s, the easy listening music audience was aging while advertisers mostly seek young and middle aged adults. Management decided to make a change.

In January 1984, 98.1 switched to a country music format, calling itself "98.1 The Hawk". It switched its call letters to WHWK. Citadel Broadcasting acquired WHWK and its AM counterpart, WNBF.
