= WICZ-TV =

Television station in Binghamton, New York

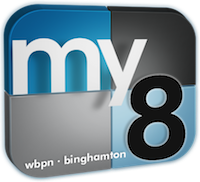
- Binghamton, New York; United States
- Channels: Digital: 7 (VHF); Virtual: 40
- Branding: Fox 40; My 8 (40.2)

Programming
- Affiliations: 40.1: Fox; 40.2: Independent with MyNetworkTV; 40.3: Ion Television

Ownership
- Owner: Deltavision Media; (Binghamton License LLC)

History
- First air date: November 1, 1957
- Former call signs: WINR-TV (1957–1971)
- Former channel numbers: Analog: 40 (UHF, 1957–2009); Digital: 8 (VHF, until 2020)
- Former affiliations: NBC (1957–1996); ABC (secondary, 1957–1962); UPN (secondary, c. 1999–2000)
- Call sign meaning: Henry Guzewicz (former owner)

Technical information
- Licensing authority: FCC
- Facility ID: 62210
- ERP: 28 kW
- HAAT: 372.9 m (1,223 ft)
- Transmitter coordinates: 42°3′22″N 75°56′38″W

Links
- Public license information: Public file; LMS
- Website: www.wicz.com

WICZ-TV (channel 40) is a television station in Binghamton, New York, United States, affiliated with Fox and MyNetworkTV. Owned by Deltavision Media, the station maintains studios on Vestal Parkway East (NY 434) in Vestal, and its transmitter is located on Ingraham Hill Road in the town of Binghamton.

== History ==
The station signed on November 1, 1957, as WINR-TV, the area's second television station, and aired an analog signal on UHF channel 40. The station was originally owned by the then-Rochester-based Gannett Company, which purchased the station's construction permit along with NBC Radio Network affiliate WINR (680 AM) in January of that year. The WINR stations were part of a newspaper-broadcast combination owned by Gannett in Binghamton, operating alongside the Binghamton Press. Upon its purchase of WINR, the Press went to work towards completing the construction of channel 40, and used its pages to educate readers on how to receive the new UHF signal. At its sign-on, WINR-TV was primarily an NBC television affiliate, though it also carried some ABC programming before WBJA-TV (channel 34, now WIVT) went on the air in 1962.

Gannett announced on July 30, 1970, that it would sell its Binghamton broadcasting interests, while retaining the Binghamton Press. Broadcast tower manufacturer Stainless, Inc. acquired WINR-TV as part of this divestiture. Upon receiving approval of the sale, the station changed its call letters to the current WICZ-TV (for company owner Henry Guzewicz) on April 7, 1971. That fall, the station moved to an 870-foot (270 m) tower on Ingraham Hill; it had previously shared a transmitter location with WINR radio.

In November 1995, WICZ-TV announced it would be dropping its NBC affiliation and switching to Fox; the station stated that the switch would allow it to expand its news programming. WICZ already had a secondary affiliation with Fox to carry the Fox Kids block, which resulted in the station beginning to preempt much of NBC's programming (especially its daytime soap operas). Prior to the station's affiliation with Fox, the network's two closest over-the-air affiliates were Syracuse affiliate WSYT and Scranton affiliate WOLF-TV, neither of which had a strong signal to cover the city of Binghamton proper owing to the area's rugged terrain. The majority of Fox's programming was only available on cable via Foxnet, WOLF-TV, or New York City owned-and-operated station WNYW, depending on the location. The affiliation change took place April 4, 1996, after WICZ's contract with NBC expired. NBC programming was then seen on cable via a localized version of Elmira's WETM-TV; the network regained an over-the-air affiliate in Binghamton a year later when WETM's owners, Smith Broadcasting, purchased WBGH-LP (channel 8, now WBGH-CD channel 20) and made it a semi-satellite of WETM.

Stainless, whose holdings by this point included its tower manufacturing business, WICZ-TV, and KTVZ in Bend, Oregon, was sold to Northwest Broadcasting for $17 million in 1997. Though Northwest would sell the Stainless tower company to SpectraSite Holdings in 1999, it would still own WICZ under the Stainless Broadcasting name. During the late 1990s, WICZ added a secondary affiliation with UPN; in 2000, Northwest bought W10CO (channel 10), changed its call letters to WBPN-LP, and moved UPN programming there.

On September 16, 2013, it was announced that Mission Broadcasting would acquire WICZ-TV and WBPN-LP from Stainless Broadcasting. Upon the deal's completion, the stations' operations would have been taken over by Nexstar Broadcasting Group, making them sister stations to WIVT and WBGH-CA. Stainless withdrew the license assignment application on March 18, 2015, following the deal's cancellation.

In February 2019, Reuters reported that Apollo Global Management had agreed to acquire the entirety of Brian Brady's television portfolio, which it intended to merge with Cox Media Group (which Apollo was acquiring at the same time) and stations spun off from Nexstar Media Group's purchase of Tribune Broadcasting, once the purchases were approved by the FCC. In March 2019 filings with the FCC, Apollo confirmed that its newly-formed broadcasting group, Terrier Media, would acquire Northwest Broadcasting, with Brian Brady holding an unspecified minority interest in Terrier. In June 2019, it was announced that Terrier Media would instead operate as Cox Media Group, as Apollo had reached a deal to also acquire Cox's radio and advertising businesses. The transaction was completed on December 17.

On March 29, 2022, Cox Media Group announced it would sell WICZ-TV and 17 other stations to Imagicomm Communications, an affiliate of the parent company of the INSP cable channel, for $488 million; the sale was completed on August 1. On April 8, 2025, Imagicomm announced that WICZ-TV would be acquired by Webb Collums's Deltavision Media; the deal was consummated on August 15.

== News operation ==
News logo from August 2012 to December 2017.

Since switching networks, WICZ has consistently maintained lower viewership than rival CBS outlet WBNG-TV and remains ranked at second, but that gap has closed slightly in recent years. The big three affiliate has always been a ratings powerhouse in Binghamton. For the most part, WIVT has always been a non-factor in the local newscast race. The ABC outlet has spent most of its history as the third station in what was originally a two-station market (since WIVT did not sign-on until November 1962) and virtually gained no benefit when WICZ joined Fox.

On Memorial Day in 2009, in an attempt to increase its presence against WBNG, WICZ added a thirty-minute newscast weeknights at 6 joining their flagship nightly prime time broadcast at 10. WBNG already established a weeknight newscast in the prime time slot airing on its CW second digital subchannel. The prime time newscast on WBNG-DT2 would eventually be expanded to weekends at some point in time.

On June 5, 2009, there was an increase in viewership on WICZ (and to a larger extent on WBNG) when WIVT announced its plans to consolidate news operations with WETM-TV in Elmira. WIVT eventually began simulcasting some of WETM's newscasts featuring regional weather coverage but not a full news focus of the Eastern Twin Tiers region. A separate, taped newscast specifically covering the Binghamton area was subsequently brought back to WIVT on June 28. On August 19, 2012, WICZ became the market's first television station to upgrade local news production to high definition level. The transition included a new on-air look with state-of-the-art graphics and updated set design.

== Technical information ==
=== Subchannels ===
The station's signal is multiplexed:

Subchannels of WICZ-TV
Subchannel	Res.	Short name	Programming
40.1	1080i	WICZDT	Fox
40.2	720p	MY8	Independent with MyNetworkTV
40.3	480i	WICZION	Ion

=== Analog-to-digital conversion ===
WICZ-TV shut down its analog signal, over UHF channel 40, on April 16, 2009. The station's digital signal remained on its pre-transition VHF channel 8, using virtual channel 40.
