= WNBF-FM =

Radio station in Binghamton, New York (1942–1952)

WNBF-FM was an FM radio station in Binghamton, New York, that began broadcasting, as W49BN, in 1942. It was the first commercial FM station authorized in the Southern Tier region. WNBF-FM suspended operations and was deleted in 1952.

== History ==
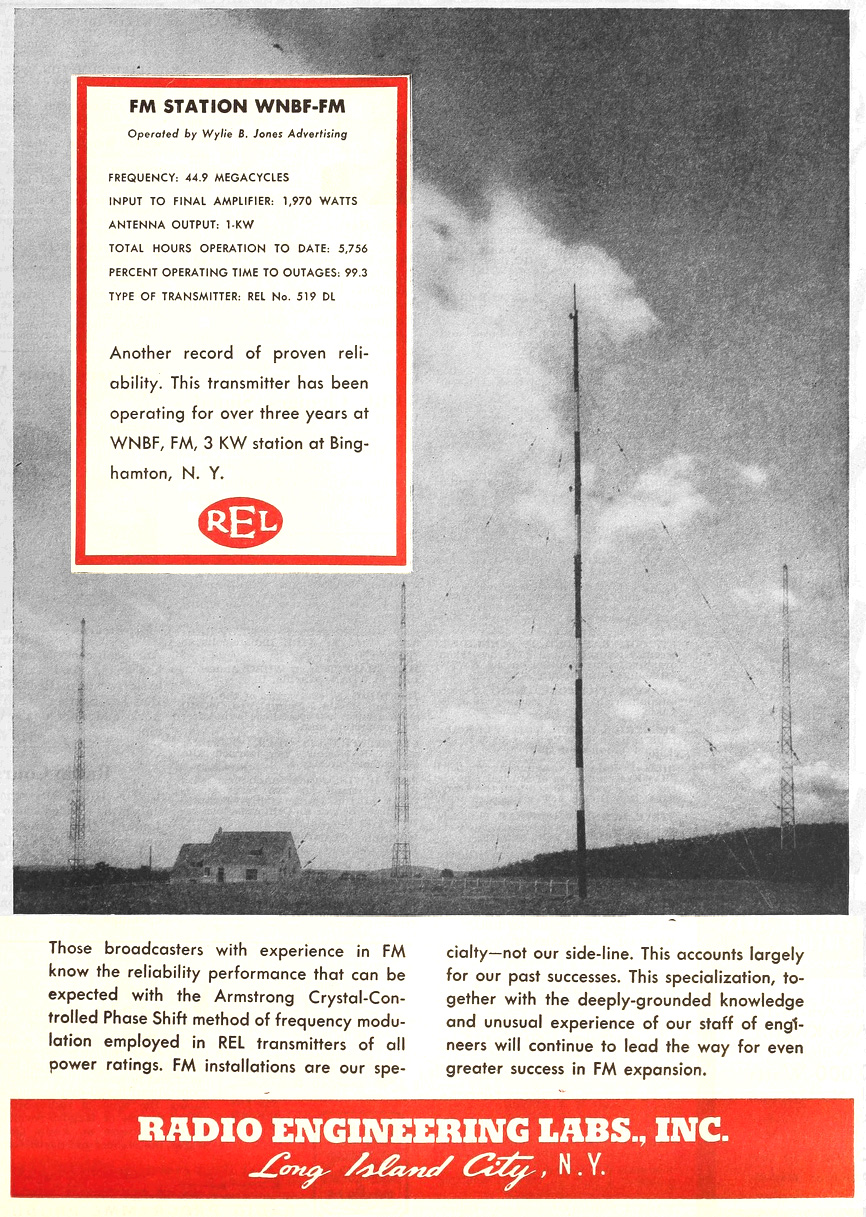
1945 advertisement showcasing the WNBF-FM transmitter site.

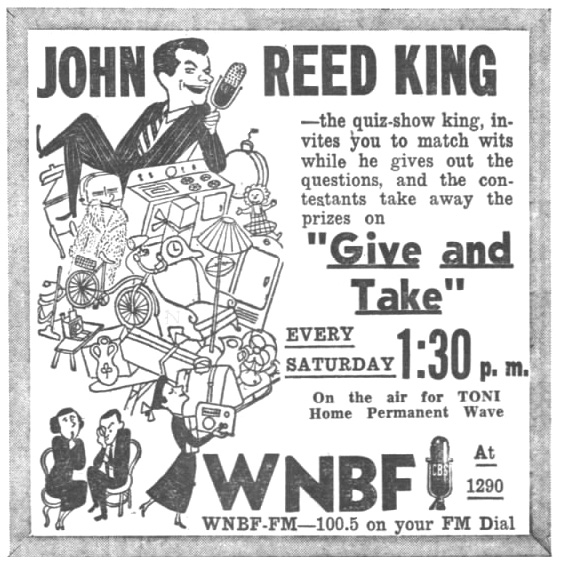
By 1950 WNBF-FM was generally a secondary outlet, primarily simulcasting WNBF (AM).

On October 31, 1940, the Federal Communications Commission (FCC) awarded the first fifteen commercial FM station construction permits, including an assignment on 44.9 MHz in Binghamton to the Howitt-Wood Radio Company, which was issued the call sign W49BN. In early 1941 ownership was transferred to the Wylie B. Jones Advertising Agency. W49BN began broadcasting in 1942. Effective November 1, 1943, the FCC modified its policy for FM call signs, and the call letters were changed to WNBF-FM.

On June 27, 1945, the FCC announced the reassignment of the FM band to 80 channels from 88–106 MHz, which was soon expanded to 100 channels from 88–108 MHz. WNBF-FM was originally assigned to 96.3 MHz on the new band, which was later changed to 100.5 MHz. The FCC provided that, during a transitional period, stations could simultaneously broadcast on both their old and new frequencies.

WNBF-FM was the companion to AM station WNBF. WNBF-FM initially maintained a schedule separate from WNBF, including programming from the recently formed Continental Network. However, to reduce expenses, in the mid-1940s it switched to primarily simulcasting the AM station. In 1950, Cecil D. Mastin, general manager of WNBF, WNBF-FM, and WNBF-TV, conducted a survey, soliciting listener letters to determine whether the money-losing operation of WNBF-FM should continue. The review found sufficient support, especially among listeners 25 to 50 miles (40 to 80 km) away, who had difficulty, especially at night, picking up the AM station. Mastin concluded that currently "Neither the number of sets nor the number of listeners is economically sufficient, but they are nevertheless substantial." Moreover, "The response to the survey shows me that we are not operating on barren ground but that FM is a young sapling worth cultivating", and "we realize that as more and better FM sets are made, our service is increased... So, perhaps the FM nag is getting out of the starting gate. Will she overcome her handicaps? Who knows! Anyway, we will continue to ride not one, not two, but all three-AM, FM, TV."

However, the reprieve was short-lived, and the license for WNBF-FM was cancelled on August 11, 1952. In 1955, Triangle Publications purchased WNBF, WNBF-TV, and the construction permit for a new WNBF-FM on 98.1 MHz, which began broadcasting in 1956.
