= WBNG-TV =

Television station in Binghamton, New York

- Binghamton, New York; United States
- Channels: Digital: 8 (VHF); Virtual: 12
- Branding: WBNG 12; 12 News; Binghamton CW (12.2)

Programming
- Affiliations: 12.1: CBS; 12.2: CW+; for others, see § Subchannels

Ownership
- Owner: Gray Media; (Gray Television Licensee, LLC)

History
- First air date: December 1, 1949
- Former call signs: WNBF-TV (1949–1972)
- Former channel numbers: Analog: 12 (VHF, 1949–2009); Digital: 7 (VHF, until 2020)
- Former affiliations: All secondary: DuMont (1949–1955); NBC (1949–1957); ABC (1949–1962)
- Call sign meaning: Binghamton

Technical information
- Licensing authority: FCC
- Facility ID: 23337
- ERP: 23.8 kW
- HAAT: 373.6 m (1,226 ft)
- Transmitter coordinates: 42°3′31″N 75°57′5″W

Links
- Public license information: Public file; LMS
- Website: wbng.com

WBNG-TV (channel 12) is a television station in Binghamton, New York, United States, affiliated with CBS and The CW Plus. The station is owned by Gray Media, and maintains studios on Columbia Drive in Johnson City and a transmitter on Ingraham Hill Road in the town of Binghamton.

== History ==
The station signed on December 1, 1949, as WNBF-TV and was originally owned by Clark Associates Inc. along with WNBF radio (1290 AM and 98.1 FM, now WHWK). At its launch, WNBF carried programs from all four American television networks at the time (CBS, DuMont, NBC, and ABC) since it was the market's first television outlet to launch. For many of its early years, WNBF was the only station available to viewers in the nearby Scranton–Wilkes-Barre, Pennsylvania, market as set owners pointed their roof-top antennas north towards Binghamton. The station subsequently lost its affiliations with DuMont in 1956 after the network's collapse, and the others when new UHF stations arrived in town: NBC on WINR-TV (channel 40, now WICZ-TV) in 1957; and ABC to WBJA-TV (channel 34, now WIVT) in 1962. WNBF launched its first newscast in partnership with the Binghamton Press on January 30, 1950.

The station was a major beneficiary of a quirk in the Federal Communications Commission (FCC)'s plan for allocating stations. In the early days of broadcast television, there were twelve VHF channels available and 69 UHF channels (later reduced to 55 in 1983). The VHF bands were more desirable because they carried longer distances. Since there were only twelve VHF channels available, there were limitations as to how closely the stations could be spaced.

After the FCC's Sixth Report and Order ended the license freeze and opened the UHF band in 1952, it devised a plan for allocating VHF licenses. Under this plan, almost all of the country would be able to receive two commercial VHF channels plus one noncommercial channel. Most of the rest of the country ("1/2") would be able to receive a third VHF channel. Other areas would be designated as "UHF islands" since they were too close to larger cities for VHF service. The "2" networks became CBS and NBC, "+1" represented non-commercial educational stations, and "1/2" became ABC (which was the weakest network usually winding up with the UHF allocation where no VHF was available).

However, the Binghamton market was sandwiched between Syracuse (channels 3, 8 (later 5), and 9) and Utica (channel 13, later 2) to the north, Elmira (a UHF island) to the west, Scranton–Wilkes-Barre (a UHF island) to the south, and Albany–Schenectady–Troy (channels 4 (later 6), 10, and later joined by 13) and New York City (channels 2, 4, 5, 7, 9, 11, and 13) to the east. This created a large "doughnut" in south-central New York where there could only be one VHF license. Binghamton was also too close to Lancaster, Pennsylvania, and New Haven, Connecticut, to reallocate channel 8 into the market; the original channel 8 allocation would later be moved to Rochester. Additionally, UHF signals usually do not travel very far over rugged terrain, as was the case in Binghamton and in Scranton–Wilkes-Barre. As a result, WNBF was the only station in Binghamton until WINR-TV signed on in 1957.

Philadelphia-based Triangle Publications, owner of various broadcasting and newspaper properties, purchased the WNBF stations in 1955. As part of Triangle's exit from broadcasting in 1972, WNBF-AM-FM-TV and sister stations in Altoona and Lebanon (both in Pennsylvania) were sold to Gateway Communications. Gateway was a new broadcasting concern majority-owned by the Borg family, publishers of the Bergen Record of Hackensack, New Jersey, and headed by George Koehler, president of Triangle's broadcast division. As a condition of the purchase, Gateway sold the WNBF radio stations to Des Moines–based Stoner Broadcasting and retained channel 12 which was renamed to its current call sign, WBNG-TV on October 28, 1972.

In September 1998, an agreement between WBNG, The WB 100+ Station Group and the area's cable provider allowed the station to launch the WB-affiliated "WBXI" cable channel, which replaced superstation WPIX on Binghamton-area cable systems. Since it was a cable-exclusive outlet, the call sign was not officially recognized by the FCC. WBNG provided sales and promotional opportunities to "WBXI".

In 2000, Gateway was purchased by SJL Broadcasting which reduced staff from 100 to 58 over five years to fit the aggressive SJL automation model. In 2002, WBNG's digital signal on VHF channel 7 signed on.

In April 2006, it was announced that Granite Broadcasting made a deal to acquire the station from Television Station Group License Subsidiary, LLC (successor to SJL and a subsidiary of Alta Communications) for $45 million. The required money was funded by a new senior credit facility created after the previously announced sales of Detroit's WMYD and San Francisco's KBWB fell apart. Granite would close on its purchase of WBNG on July 26, 2006. As part of the transaction, Les Vann (formerly president and general manager of CBS affiliate WTVH in Syracuse) was promoted to executive vice president of the company's Central and Southern New York operations. His duties were regional in nature with responsibilities at both WBNG and WTVH.

WBNG's digital signal began broadcasting network programming in high definition in late January 2007. Beginning in September 2007, CW affiliate "WBXI" began to be simulcast on a new second digital subchannel of WBNG; the faux "WBXI" call sign, which was inherited from the former WB 100+ cable-only channel, was then dropped. In December 2008, it was announced a deal was reached between Granite and Time Warner Cable to carry WBNG's high definition feed throughout the Binghamton region. This was the first time HD programming from CBS was available to customers in the Southern Tier of New York State without using an antenna.

Former logo.

Action News's former logo, before dropped.

On February 11, 2014, Quincy Newspapers announced that it had reached a deal to purchase WBNG from Granite along with other company-owned and/or managed stations in three other markets. The sale was approved on September 15, 2015 and completed on November 2.

Until April 25, 2009, WBNG served as the longtime default CBS affiliate for the Elmira–Corning area. On that date, ABC affiliate WENY-TV signed on a new second digital subchannel in order to offer access to CBS for the first time ever in that market. On November 22, 2015, WBNG also lost its status as the default CBS affiliate for most of Otsego County in the Utica market (as did former sister station WTVH in Syracuse for the rest of that DMA), when NBC affiliate WKTV's second digital subchannel became CBS' first full-time affiliate in that area. However, WBNG continues to be shown in Otsego County (alongside WKTV-DT2) as a result of viewer complaints caused when the station was taken off Time Warner Cable systems on August 31, 2016. The WBNG signal was restored January 25, 2017.

On February 1, 2021, Gray Television announced its intent to purchase Quincy Media for $925 million. The acquisition was completed on August 2, making WBNG-TV the second Gray property in New York State and a sister station to fellow CBS affiliate WWNY-TV in Watertown.

== Technical information ==
=== Subchannels ===
The station's signal is multiplexed:

Subchannels of WBNG-TV
Channel	Res.	Short name	Programming
12.1	1080i	WBNGCBS	CBS
12.2	720p	WBNGCW	The CW Plus
12.3	480i	WBNGME	MeTV
12.4	480i	CourtTV	Court TV
12.5	480i	Grit	Grit
12.6	480i	WBNGOUT	Outlaw

=== Analog-to-digital conversion ===
WBNG-TV shut down its analog signal, over VHF channel 12, on June 12, 2009, the official date on which full-power television stations in the United States transitioned from analog to digital broadcasts under federal mandate. The station's digital signal remained on its pre-transition VHF channel 7, using virtual channel 12.

== Out-of-market cable coverage ==
Outside of Binghamton, WBNG is carried on Charter Spectrum in Liberty and Highland Lake, in Sullivan County, which is a part of the New York City market.

== See also ==
- Channel 8 digital TV stations in the United States
- Channel 12 virtual TV stations in the United States
