= WSQX-FM =

Coordinates: 42.132°N 75.932°W

- Binghamton, New York; United States
- Broadcast area: Southern Tier
- Frequency: 91.5 MHz

Programming
- Format: Public radio
- Affiliations: NPR, Pacifica Radio

Ownership
- Owner: WSKG Public Telecommunications Council
- Sister stations: WIOX, WSKG-FM, WSKG-TV

History
- First air date: January 1995

Technical information
- Licensing authority: FCC
- Facility ID: 74064
- Class: A
- ERP: 3,500 watts
- HAAT: 116 meters (381 ft)

Links
- Public license information: Public file; LMS
- Website: www.wskg.org

WSQX-FM is an NPR member radio station in south-central New York State. It operates in Binghamton, New York, on 91.5 MHz (FM), and has an effective radiated power of 3.5 kW. The signal is repeated in Greene by WSQN 88.1 MHz, in Corning by translator station W214AA on 90.7 MHz, and in Cooperstown by translator station W290CI on 105.9 MHz.

WSQX-FM began broadcast at the beginning of 1995. The station had long aired an expanded schedule of NPR news programming, along with jazz music. However, on February 3, 2019, it switched to a mix of classical music during the week and jazz and folk music on weekends, consolidating all NPR news programming on sister station WSKG-FM.

WSKG-TV and WSKG-FM are other broadcast stations owned and operated by the WSKG Public Telecommunications Council.

== Simulcast ==
Call sign	Frequency	City of license	ERP (W)	Height m (ft)	Class
WSQN	88.1 FM	Greene, New York	850	182 meters (597 ft)	A

== Translators ==
Broadcast translators for WSQX-FM
Call sign	Frequency	City of license	FID	ERP (W)	HAAT	Class	FCC info
W214AA	90.7 FM	Corning, New York	74038	8	302.9 m (994 ft)	D	LMS
W290CI	105.9 FM	Cooperstown, New York	158555	10	153 m (502 ft)	D	LMS

== See also ==
- WIOX
- WSKG-FM
