= Oakdale Commons =

- Location: Johnson City, New York
- Coordinates: 42°7′41″N 75°58′27″W
- Address: 601-635 Harry L Drive, Johnson City, NY 13790
- Opened: October 1, 1975; 51 years ago
- Developer: Interstate Properties
- Manager: JFM Real Estate
- Owner: Spark JC, LLC
- Num. of stores: 60
- Num. of anchor tenants: 9
- Floor area: 963,475 square feet (89,509.8 m^{2})
- Floors: 1
- Public transit: B.C. Transit
- Website: oakdalecommons.com

Oakdale Commons (formerly Oakdale Mall) is an enclosed super-regional shopping mall in Johnson City, New York, United States, serving the Binghamton metropolitan area. The mall has a gross leasable area of 963,475 square feet (89,510 m^{2}). The mall opened in 1975, by the development company, Interstate Properties.

The mall's anchors are JCPenney, Dick's Sporting Goods, Beer Tree, Guthrie Health & Fitness, Guthrie Broome Orthopedic & Spine Surgery Center, Guthrie Medical Offices, Broome County KinderCare, Broome-Tioga Workforce NY, and BJ's Wholesale Club.

In 2017, the Macy's anchor store closed. The building was eventually renovated as Dick's House of Sports, a specialty concept by Dick's Sporting Goods, which opened in 2023.

In 2017, Sears closed its anchor store. The building was reconstructed as "Factory by Beer Tree", a restaurant offering two levels of indoor and outdoor dining space, and Lourdes Health and Fitness a gym with three pools, a steam room and sauna, and a fitness floor.

In April 2018, The Bon-Ton chain went out of business and their anchor store closed. In 2023, the building was demolished and replaced by a new BJ's Wholesale Club. BJ's opened in January 2024.

In September 2022, Burlington announced it would close and move to Town Square Mall in Vestal.

On April 21, 2023, it was announced that Dave & Busters would open at the mall in 2024.

On October 14, 2022, it was reported the mall envisions a $117 million plan to further develop the concourse while being known simply as Oakdale Commons. The mall developer proclaimed, "We have significant plans for further development."

As of 2025 and into 2026, several areas of the mall are currently undergoing construction and redevelopment. This construction and redevelopment includes the former Burlington anchor to add new medical and retail facilities, new drainage systems, replacing the west side parking lot, a multiple story apartment complex in the north end of the mall, and new shops and restaurants near the south end of the mall. Several new stores and construction is also ongoing inside the mall to add new stores and services. Marshalls, Chick-Fil-A, Guthrie Broome Orthopedic & Spine Surgery Center, and an upcoming daycare center run by Broome County called Broome County KinderCare are among the current construction projects.
