= WNBF =

Coordinates: 42°3′29.3″N 75°57′13.7″W

Binghamton, New York; United States
- Broadcast area: Southern Tier
- Frequency: 1290 kHz
- Branding: News Radio 1290 AM & 92.1 FM

Programming
- Format: News-talk
- Network: ABC News Radio
- Affiliations: CBS News Radio; Premiere Networks; Salem Radio Network; Westwood One; Binghamton Rumble Ponies

Ownership
- Owner: Townsquare Media; (Townsquare License, LLC)
- Sister stations: WAAL; WHWK; WWYL

History
- First air date: February 7, 1927; 99 years ago

Technical information
- Licensing authority: FCC
- Facility ID: 72372
- Class: B
- Power: 9,300 watts day; 5,000 watts night
- Translator: 92.1 W221EJ (Binghamton)

Links
- Public license information: Public file; LMS
- Webcast: wnbf.com/listen-live/
- Website: Listen live

WNBF (1290 AM) is a commercial radio station in Binghamton, New York. It airs a news/talk format and is owned by Townsquare Media. The studios and offices are on Court Street in Binghamton.

By day, WNBF is powered at 9,300 watts using a non-directional antenna. At night, to protect other stations on AM 1290, it reduces power to 5,000 watts and switches to a three-tower array directional antenna. The transmitter is off Ingraham Hill Road in Binghamton, among the towers for other broadcast stations in the Binghamton area. WNBF is also heard on 250-watt FM translator W221EJ at 92.1 MHz.

== Programming ==
Weekdays begin with two local shows, First News with Don Morgan followed by Binghamton Now with Bob Joseph. The rest of the weekday schedule is made up of nationally syndicated conservative talk programs: The Vince Show with Vince Coglianese, The Sean Hannity Show, The Mark Levin Show, CBS Eye on the World with John Batchelor and Red Eye Radio.

Weekend programming includes shows on health, money, car repair, home improvement, a Saturday oldies show and a Sunday morning polka music show. Syndicated weekend programs include The Kim Komando Show, At Home with Gary Sullivan, The Mike Gallagher Show and Sunday Night with Bill Cunningham. It also carries Binghamton Rumble Ponies minor league baseball games. Most hours begin with an update from ABC News Radio.

== History ==
WNBF is one of the Southern Tier's oldest radio stations. Although the station has traditionally traced its founding to 1928, the year it moved to Binghamton, it was first licensed on February 7, 1927, to the Howitt-Wood Radio Company (Lyle E. Howitt and H. L. Wood) at 117 West Main Street in Endicott, New York, with 50 watts on 1460 kHz, operating from the Elvin Theater. The WNBF call letters were randomly assigned from a sequential roster of available call signs.

The station was moved to 1450 kHz on June 15, 1927. On November 11, 1928, it was reassigned to 1500 kHz as a low-powered "local" station, as part of a major reallocation implemented by the Federal Radio Commission's General Order 40. Later that month the studios moved to the Arlington Hotel in Binghamton.

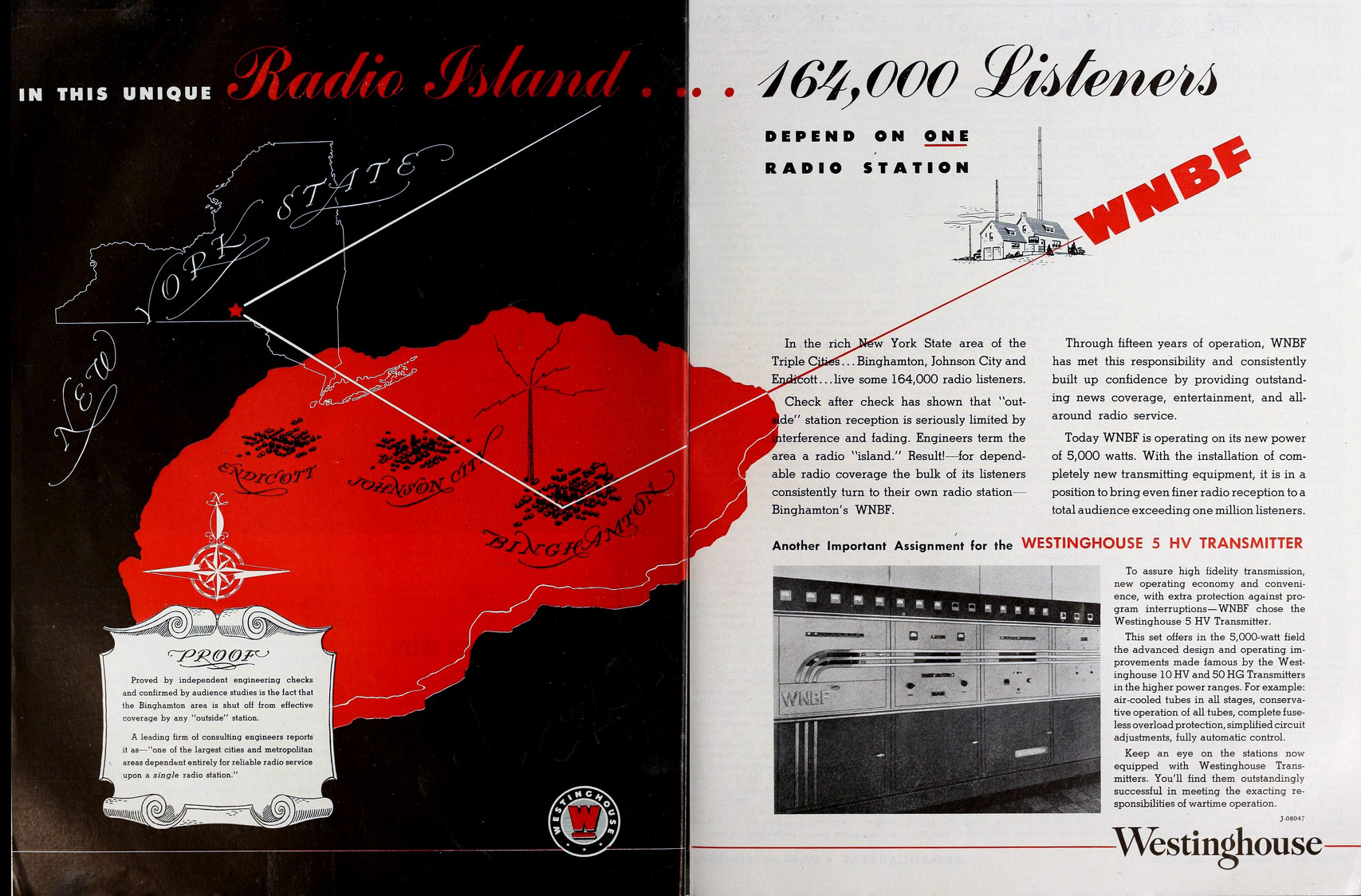
In 1942 WNBF moved to 1290 kHz with 5,000 watts.

In 1940, the Federal Communications Commission awarded the Howitt-Wood Radio Company one of first construction permits for a commercial FM station. Originally on 44.9 MHz as W49BN, it later became WNBF-FM on 100.5 MHz. The license for this original WNBF-FM was cancelled on August 11, 1952.

In early 1941 station ownership was transferred to the Wylie B. Jones Advertising Agency. On March 29, 1941, most of the stations on 1500 kHz, including WNBF, moved to 1490 kHz, with the implementation of the North American Regional Broadcasting Agreement. In 1942, WNBF moved to 1290 kHz, with a power increase from 250 to 5,000 watts. In 1946, the station owners became Clark Associates, Inc. In 1949 a 384-foot (117 m) transmission tower was constructed for use by both the AM and FM radio stations, plus a newly authorized television station, WNBF-TV channel 12 (now WBNG-TV).

In 1955, Triangle Publications purchased WNBF-AM-TV and the construction permit for a new WNBF-FM (now WHWK) on 98.1 MHz, which began broadcasting in 1956. Triangle also owned TV Guide magazine. In 1972, Stoner Broadcasting, based in Des Moines, bought WNBF-AM-FM, and Gateway Communications, publishers of The Record of Bergen County, New Jersey, bought WNBF-TV. Citadel Broadcasting acquired WNBF and WHWK in 1999.

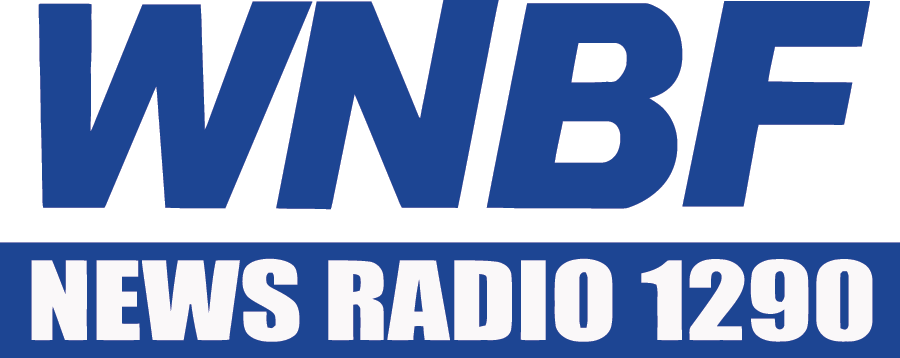
Former logo before 92.1 translator sign on

In 2021, an FM translator W221EJ signed on at 92.1 FM to rebroadcast WNBF.

Over its long history, WNBF has been home to some of the biggest names in area broadcasting, such as Bill Parker, John Leslie, Roger Neel and Bernard Fionte.
