= WAAL =

Coordinates: 42.059°N 75.951°W

- Binghamton, New York; United States
- Broadcast area: Binghamton metropolitan area; Southern Tier
- Frequency: 99.1 MHz
- Branding: 99.1 The Whale

Programming
- Format: Classic rock
- Affiliations: New York Giants Radio Network; Compass Media Networks; United Stations Radio Networks

Ownership
- Owner: Townsquare Media; (Townsquare License, LLC)
- Sister stations: WHWK, WNBF, WWYL

History
- First air date: March 1954 (as 95.3 WKOP-FM)
- Former call signs: WKOP-FM (1954–1975)
- Call sign meaning: Play on the word "Whale"

Technical information
- Licensing authority: FCC
- Facility ID: 7920
- Class: B
- ERP: 8,700 watts
- HAAT: 291 meters (955 ft)

Links
- Public license information: Public file; LMS
- Webcast: Listen Live
- Website: 991thewhale.com

WAAL (99.1 FM; "The Whale") is a commercial radio station licensed to Binghamton, New York. It airs a classic rock radio format and is owned by Townsquare Media. WAAL is the oldest FM radio station continuously broadcasting in the Binghamton metropolitan area. It is an affiliate of the New York Giants Radio Network. The studios and offices are on Court Street in Binghamton. The transmitter is off Ingraham Hill Road, also in Binghamton, amid other towers for local TV and FM stations.

== History ==
=== WKOP-FM ===
In March 1954, the station signed on as WKOP-FM at 95.3 MHz. It was the FM counterpart of WKOP (1360 AM; later WYOS). The two stations simulcast and were network affiliates of the Mutual Broadcasting System. They were owned by Binghamton Broadcasters, Inc. At first, WKOP-FM broadcast at only 420 watts, a fraction of the station's current power.

While WKOP-FM (now WAAL) has been continuously on the air since 1954, WNBF-FM (now 98.1 WHWK) went on the air 14 years earlier as an experimental station owned by the Howitt-Wood Radio Company. But it left the airwaves from 1952 to 1956.

In the 1960s, WKOP-FM received Federal Communications Commission (FCC) permission to move to 99.1 MHz, with an increase in power to 33,000 watts. By 1970, it ended its simulcast with WKOP 1360 and began playing a progressive rock format.

=== WAAL ===
In 1974, the station was sold to Butternut Broadcasting, which switched the call sign to WAAL. It moved to an album-oriented rock (AOR) format, playing the top tracks from the biggest selling albums. The station was known as "WAAL Stereo FM 99". It pronounces its call letters as "Whale" and uses a cartoon whale as its mascot.

The station dropped its AOR format in October 1985 for Top 40/CHR after contemporary hit station WWWT-FM switched to adult contemporary music. In the late 1980s and early 1990s, WAAL was known as "The Hot FM" and was affiliated with the ABC FM Network.

Wicks Broadcasting bought WAAL in 1996. It ended its run as a Top 40/CHR station and changed its format to classic rock.

=== Citadel ownership, then Townsquare ===
WAAL was acquired by Citadel Broadcasting in 1998 from Wicks Broadcast Group. It was part of a $77 million deal that included a total of 16 radio stations. Citadel merged with Cumulus Media on September 16, 2011.

In 2013, a $281 million, multi-station deal was worked out between Cumulus Media, Townsquare Media and Peak Broadcasting. Townsquare acquired all of Cumulus Media's Binghamton radio stations, including WAAL. With Townsquare's take over, the classic rock format has remained in place on WAAL.
