= WSKG-FM =

- Binghamton, New York; United States
- Broadcast area: Southern Tier
- Frequency: 89.3 MHz (HD Radio)

Programming
- Format: Public radio
- Subchannels: HD2: WSQX-FM simulcast
- Affiliations: NPR

Ownership
- Owner: WSKG Public Telecommunications Council
- Sister stations: WSKG-TV, WSQX-FM

History
- First air date: 1975; 51 years ago
- Call sign meaning: derived from WSKG-TV

Technical information
- Licensing authority: FCC
- Facility ID: 74039
- Class: B
- ERP: 11,500 watts
- HAAT: 317 meters (1,040 ft)
- Transmitter coordinates: 42.061°N 75.946°W
- Translator: See § Translators
- Repeater: See § Simulcasts

Links
- Public license information: Public file; LMS
- Webcast: Listen live
- Website: wskg.org

WSKG-FM, 89.3 MHz FM, is an NPR member station in Binghamton, New York. It has an effective radiated power of 11.5 kW. Due to hilly terrain, the signal is repeated on several other frequencies located throughout South Central New York State.

WSKG-FM began broadcast in October 1975. Its operator WSKG Public Telecommunications Council is a cooperative non-profit of the State University of New York Board of Regents and New York State Department of Education.

The station's format had long been principally classical music, NPR talk radio programs, and NPR news, with jazz on Friday evenings after All Things Considered and various folk music played on Saturday evenings after A Prairie Home Companion. On February 3, 2019, WSKG shuffled programming so that WSKG-FM took on an all-NPR and BBC talk and news format.

WSKG-TV and WSQX-FM are other broadcast stations operated by the WSKG Public Telecommunications Council.

== Simulcasts ==
WSKG-FM has five repeater stations to rebroadcast its programming

Call sign	Frequency	City of license	Facility ID	ERP W	Height m (ft)	Class	Notes
WSQA	88.7 FM (HD)	Hornell, New York	81145	4,500	151 m (495 ft)	B1	HD2 relays WSQX-FM
WSQC-FM	91.7 FM	Oneonta, New York	74056	570	161 m (528 ft)	A	
WSQE	91.1 FM (HD)	Corning, New York	74030	3,600	199 m (653 ft)	B1	HD2 relays WSQX-FM
WSQG-FM	90.9 FM (HD)	Ithaca, New York	74054	5,000	55 m (180 ft)	B1	HD2 relays WSQX-FM

== Translators ==
Call sign	Frequency	City of license	FID	ERP (W)	FCC info	Notes
W213BW	90.5 FM	Watkins Glen, New York	74033	10	LMS	relays WSKG-FM
W221CW	92.1 FM	Ithaca, New York	151614	250	LMS	relays WSQG-FM

== See also ==
- WIOX
- WSQX-FM
