= Press & Sun-Bulletin =

Newspaper in Binghamton, New York

- Type: Daily newspaper
- Format: Berliner
- Owner: USA Today Co.
- Editor: Kevin Hogan
- Advertising: Robb Scott
- Founded: 1904
- Headquarters: 33 Lewis Rd. Binghamton, New York United States
- Circulation: 29,771 Daily (as of 2017)
- ISSN: 0886-8816
- OCLC number: 12636926
- Website: pressconnects.com

The Press & Sun-Bulletin is a daily newspaper serving the area around Binghamton, New York.

== History ==
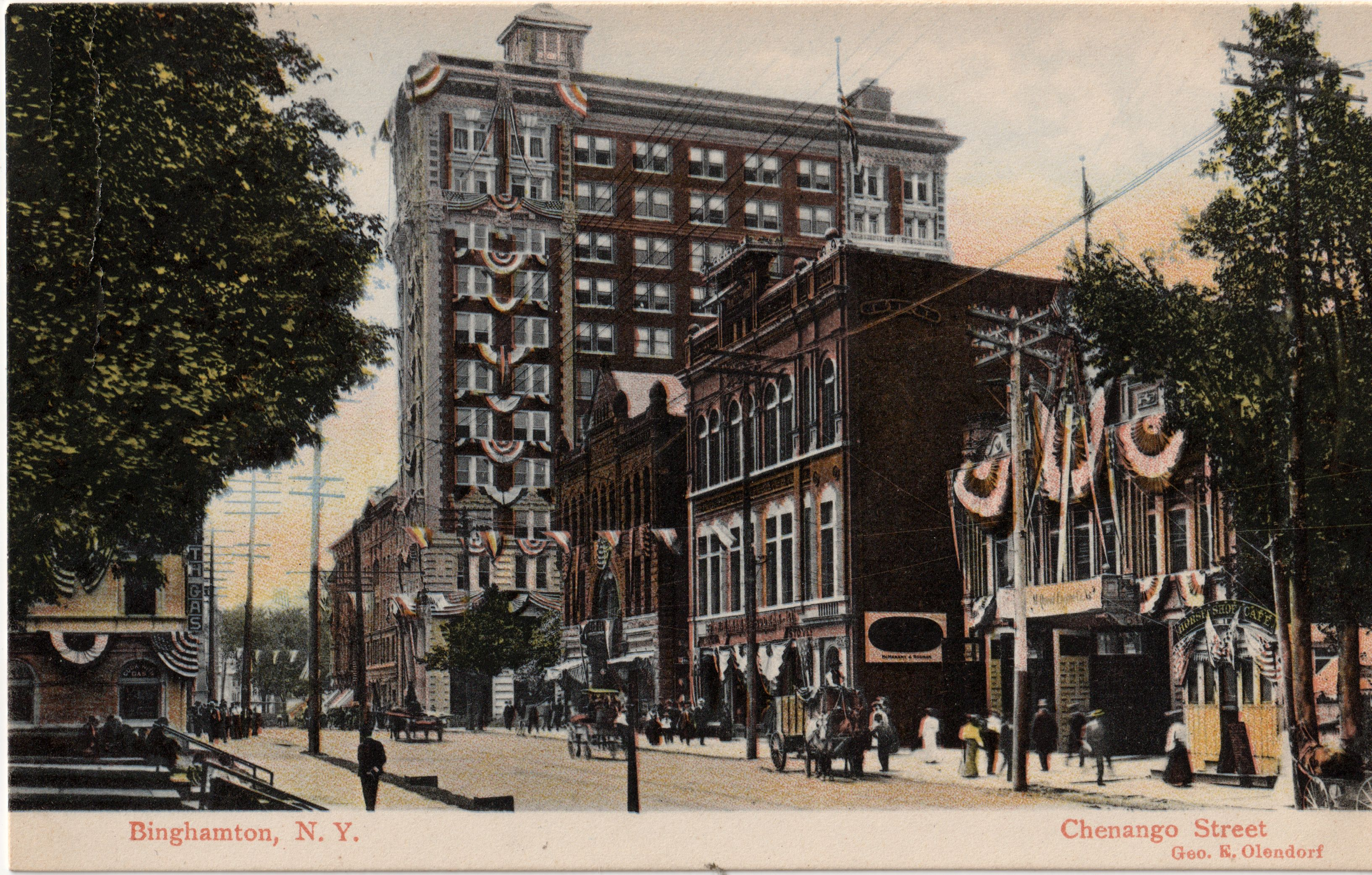
Press Building in the 1900s, shortly after its construction

The newspaper was formed by the 1985 merger of The Evening Press (which was known as The Binghamton Press prior to 1960) and The Sun-Bulletin. It is owned by Gannett, who purchased The Binghamton Press in 1943 and The Sun-Bulletin in 1971.
