= Binghamton (town), New York =

Binghamton, New York
- Town
- Seal

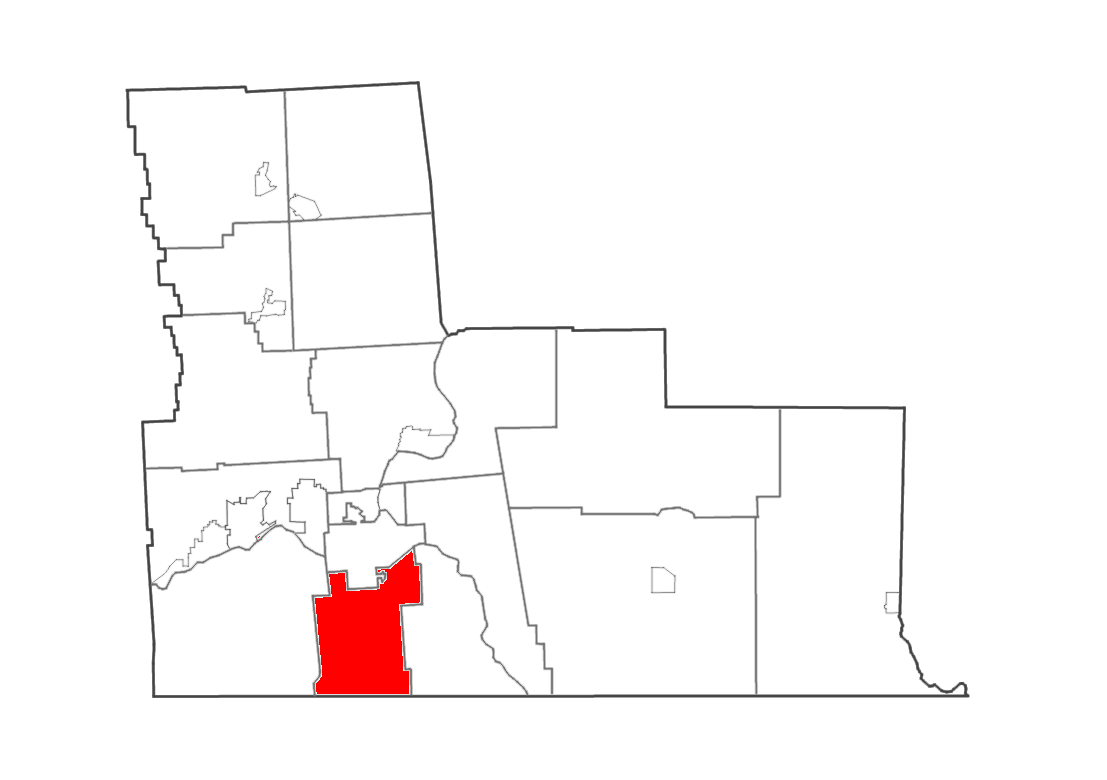
- Location within Broome County

- Location within New York Location within the United States
- Coordinates: 42°3′38″N 75°54′25″W
- Country: United States
- State: New York
- County: Broome

Government
  - Town Council: Members' List: • Marty Merriam; • Nancy Yezzi; • Norman Cline; • Vicky Xlander

Area
  - Total: 25.34 sq mi (65.63 km^{2})
- Elevation: 1,621 ft (494 m)

Population (2020)
  - Total: 4,623 ▼
  - Estimate (2021): 4,571
  - Density: 190.3/sq mi (73.49/km^{2})
- Time zone: UTC-5 (Eastern (EST))
  - Summer (DST): UTC-4 (EDT)
- ZIP Codes: 13903 (Binghamton); 13850 (Vestal)
- Area code: 607
- FIPS code: 36-06618
- GNIS feature ID: 978734
- Website: townofbinghamton.gov

Binghamton is a town in Broome County, New York, United States. The population was 4,623 at the 2020 census. The town is named after an early developer, William Bingham.

The town of Binghamton partly encloses the city of Binghamton on the city's south side.

== History ==
Before European settlers arrived in North America, Chenango Point, located within the present-day Binghamton, was inhabited by Indigenous peoples as early as 3600 BCE. By the time Europeans arrived in the area, Chenango Point and the surrounding areas belonged to the Iroquois. Following the fall of the Iroquois, 10,000 acres of land were granted to William Bingham, where he established the village that would later become Binghamton in 1798.

Incorportated as a part of Chenango Point in 1834, the town of Binghamton was officially formed in 1855 with the division of the Town of Chenango. Part of the new town was lost when the village of Binghamton was first incorporated in 1834, leading in 1867, to the city of Binghamton. This process ultimately removed the northern part of the town along with its river frontage.

== Geography ==
According to the United States Census Bureau, the town of Binghamton has a total area of 25.3 square miles (65.6 km^{2}), of which 25.3 square miles (65.4 km^{2}) is land and 0.077 square miles (0.2 km^{2}), or 0.35%, is water.

Binghamton is south of the junction of the Susquehanna River and Chenango River and is in the Southern Tier of New York State. The southern town line is the border of Pennsylvania.

Bayless Creek flows northward to the Susquehanna River from the northern part of the town.

== Demographics ==
Historical population
Census	Pop.	Note	%±
1860	9,919		—
1870	2,066		−79.2%
1880	2,555		23.7%
1890	1,519		−40.5%
1900	847		−44.2%
1910	675		−20.3%
1920	672		−0.4%
1930	1,092		62.5%
1940	1,576		44.3%
1950	2,073		31.5%
1960	3,475		67.6%
1970	4,844		39.4%
1980	5,007		3.4%
1990	5,006		0.0%
2000	4,969		−0.7%
2010	4,942		−0.5%
2020	4,623		−6.5%
2021 (est.)	4,571		−1.1%
U.S. Decennial Census

As of the census of 2000, there were 4,969 people, 1,813 households, and 1,408 families residing in the town. The population density was 195.4 inhabitants per square mile (75.4/km^{2}). There were 1,911 housing units at an average density of 75.2 per square mile (29.0/km^{2}). The racial makeup of the town was 96.14% White, 1.25% Black or African American, 0.08% Native American, 0.97% Asian, 0.04% Pacific Islander, 0.38% from other races, and 1.15% from two or more races. Hispanic or Latino of any race were 1.11% of the population.

There were 1,813 households, out of which 35.9% had children under the age of 18 living with them, 64.9% were married couples living together, 8.9% had a female householder with no husband present, and 22.3% were non-families. 18.9% of all households were made up of individuals, and 8.5% had someone living alone who was 65 years of age or older. The average household size was 2.74 and the average family size was 3.12.

In the town, the population was spread out, with 27.6% under the age of 18, 6.0% from 18 to 24, 27.0% from 25 to 44, 25.9% from 45 to 64, and 13.5% who were 65 years of age or older. The median age was 40 years. For every 100 females, there were 95.6 males. For every 100 females age 18 and over, there were 94.2 males.

The median income for a household in the town was $50,676, and the median income for a family was $55,521. Males had a median income of $40,865 versus $27,424 for females. The per capita income for the town was $23,747. About 4.3% of families and 5.3% of the population were below the poverty line, including 7.5% of those under age 18 and 3.5% of those age 65 or over.

== Communities and locations in the town of Binghamton ==
- Orchard Park – A residential community, once a large apple orchard, situated along the northern part of Felters Road; most of the streets in this community are named after women of the Greblick family (e.g., Stephanie Lane, Angela Court, Karen Court, Cheryl Drive, and Bernice Boulevard).
- Hawleyton – A hamlet named after James Stanton Hawley. It was the only other settlement in the town (with the village of Binghamton) in the 19th century. The community is in the south part of the town on County Road 117. The Old Hawleyton Methodist Episcopal Church was listed on the National Register of Historic Places in 2006.
- Park Terrace – A suburban community adjacent to the southern part of the City of Binghamton.
- Summit Hill – A hamlet south of Park Terrace on County Road 117.
- Binghamton University – A public research university affiliated with SUNY.
