= WPHD =

WPHD may refer to:

- WCIM (FM), a radio station (104.9 FM) licensed to serve Montour Falls, New York, United States, which held the call sign WPHD from 2020 to 2021
- WCBF (FM), a radio station (96.1 FM) licensed to serve Elmira, New York, United States, which held the call sign WPHD from 2017 to 2020
- WENI-FM, a radio station (92.7 FM) licensed to serve South Waverly, Pennsylvania, United States, which held the call sign WPHD from 2003 to 2017
- WMTT-FM, a radio station (94.7 FM) licensed to serve Tioga, Pennsylvania, which held the call sign WPHD from 1989 to 2003
- WEDG, a radio station (103.3 FM) licensed to serve Buffalo, New York, which held the call sign WPHD-FM from 1970 to 1989
