= WTVE (New York) =

Television station in Elmira, New York

- Logo used when the station returned to the air in May 1956
- Elmira, New York; United States
- Channels: Analog: 24 (UHF)

Programming
- Affiliations: DuMont (1953–1954); CBS (1953–1954); NBC (1953, 1956); ABC (1953–1954, 1956–1957)

Ownership
- Owner: WTVE, Inc.

History
- First air date: June 15, 1953
- Last air date: February 13, 1957
- Call sign meaning: "Television Elmira"

Technical information
- ERP: 7.94 kW
- HAAT: 274 m (898 ft)
- Transmitter coordinates: 42°01′52″N 76°47′05″W

WTVE (channel 24) was a television station in Elmira, New York, United States, which operated from 1953 to 1954 and again from 1956 to 1957. It was the first station to sign on in the Elmira area. It broadcast from studios on Market Street in Elmira and a transmitter on Comfort Hill, also known as South Mountain, near Ashland. Economic problems surrounding early UHF television stations played a major role in its demise and in its pursuit of a VHF channel assignment for Elmira, which was first granted and then taken away. It lost $350,000 (equivalent to $2.98 million in 2025 dollars) in 44 months of broadcasting.

== Construction and early years ==
In June 1952, Elmira Television became the third applicant for a television station in the Elmira–Corning area when it filed an application with the Federal Communications Commission (FCC) for channel 18 in Elmira. The company was a partnership of Thompson K. Cassel and John S. Booth, who owned stakes in various radio stations in the state of Pennsylvania. That August, Elmira Television switched its proposal to channel 24; this meant it would be in competition with an application filed by the Elmira Star-Gazette instead of that of the Corning Leader.

After the two newspapers merged their bids into El-Cor Television, specifying channel 18, the FCC granted Elmira Television a construction permit for channel 24 on November 6, 1952. By the end of November, work was underway on a new transmission tower atop South Mountain, also known as Comfort Hill, in Ashland, Chemung County, New York, Elmira Television set a May 15, 1953, deadline to get on air; in March, the group modified its application to reduce the proposed effective radiated power because of an equipment shortage while raising the height of the tower. It also secured network affiliations with CBS, ABC, and the DuMont Television Network. Though cameras were on order to produce live shows, most of the new station's programming would be network and filmed material.

The May 15 start date was missed, and the first test pattern went out on June 1, 1953. Regular programming began two weeks later, on June 15. In addition to CBS, ABC, and DuMont, NBC programs were seen until the newspapers' station, WECT (channel 18), came on the air at the end of September. Live CBS and NBC programs were received from Syracuse by a microwave pickup at Ithaca, and a second microwave route through Endicott was added in October to enable reception of live ABC shows from WILK-TV in Wilkes-Barre, Pennsylvania. Local live programming began later that month from studios in a converted YMHA at Madison Avenue and Market Street, with initial offerings including a local newscast and a children's show.

By April 1954, WTVE was entertaining possible expansion, with its owners drafting up plans for a larger studio to be added on at the Madison Avenue studios. The group had also filed to build a new radio station to broadcast on 800 kHz during the day, though a conflict had been identified with a proposed outlet in Wellsville.

== Tower collapse ==
On October 15, 1954, Hurricane Hazel became the first known hurricane to pass through upstate New York. Wind gusts recorded at about 90 miles per hour (140 km/h) reached South Mountain and brought the station's 491-foot (150 m) transmission tower to the ground at 9:15 p.m., the single largest damage wrought by the storm in the Elmira area. The tower fell to the north instead of the east, thus avoiding the transmitter building, where the engineer on duty did not even hear the tower fall to the ground on account of the noisy wind.

In the wake of the tower collapse, said at the time to mean at least a month out of service for the station, Elmira Television withdrew its radio station proposal. Repair of the television facility would require not only a new tower structure but a custom-made channel 24 antenna.

== Channel 9 fight ==
However, ideas of reconstruction were overshadowed by an attempt already underway on the part of WTVE's ownership to move a VHF television station allocation—one that would not require sets to be converted, unlike on UHF—to the Elmira area. As early as 1951, the Corning Leader had proposed the assignment of channel 9 to Elmira; however, when a final table of allocations was released in 1952, it was not included because channel 9 had also been allocated to Toronto—at the time too close to Elmira to coexist. In June 1954, Cassel and Booth made the same request. Another application seeking the channel at nearby Blossburg, Pennsylvania, was also received. Local business leaders endorsed the idea, noting that, with no television station in operation in Elmira (WECT having closed the preceding May), advertisers and viewers were left dependent on Binghamton's WNBF-TV (channel 12) for television advertising sales and programming, in the case of the former forcing Elmira businesses to compete with those in Binghamton.

Opposition coalesced to the possibility of a channel 9 assignment by interests in Binghamton. There, Southern Tier Radio Service, owner of radio station WINR, held a permit to start a new UHF station on channel 40; objections were also received from the promoters of the proposed Blossburg move and from broadcasting interests in the Scranton and Wilkes-Barre area. Southern Tier Radio Service noted that a channel 9 station in Elmira, which would reach Binghamton viewers, would have "disastrous effects" on the development of television in the Binghamton region, particularly on UHF stations, and result in "less service" overall. Binghamton mayor Donald W. Kramer, owner of Southern Tier Radio Service, noted that the assignment of channel 9 in either Elmira or Blossburg would put an end to the proposed WINR-TV. WTVE and WINR-TV each sought time extensions from the FCC while it contemplated the channel 9 issue, with the proposed Binghamton station noting that it had been told by television networks that no affiliation would be available if channel 9 were inserted into the region. Both stations were ordered on the air by January 1956, with the FCC stating that economic uncertainty surrounding UHF was not a valid reason for further extensions of time to build or rebuild.

== Assignment of channel 9; return of channel 24 to air ==
On December 1, 1955, the FCC allotted channel 9 to Elmira and opened the door for applicants to file to use the channel, denying a request by WTVE that its license be automatically amended to the new assignment. A group that had in the meantime drafted plans to enter the Elmira area on channel 18 registered its opposition. WSYR-TV (channel 3) in Syracuse was being approved to build a satellite station in Elmira, but its ownership felt that inserting channel 9, a VHF station, would adversely affect its proposal to broadcast a version of WSYR-TV with locally inserted programs to the Twin Tiers. WSYR-TV and the proposed WINR-TV both drafted petitions against the allocation.

In addition to Elmira Television, the start of 1956 brought another proposal for channel 9, this time from the Star-Gazette, which proposed an NBC-affiliated station to complement WNBF-TV in Binghamton, a CBS outlet, and to match WENY radio. The FCC rejected the Syracuse and Binghamton protests to the channel assignment in March. By that time, there were four different applications filed for channel 9: the bids from WTVE and the Star-Gazette, one connected to radio station WELM, and a fourth from the Veterans Broadcasting Company of Rochester.

Amidst all of this, channel 24 rebuilt and returned to the air after an 18-month absence. After missing a February 1 deadline and being held up by unusual winter weather, a new 500 feet (150 m) mast was erected atop South Mountain, tests began in late April, and WTVE signed on again on May 6, 1956, with programs from NBC and ABC, as well as William W. Scranton—owner of WARM-TV in that Pennsylvania city—as a new 30-percent owner. This made it the sixth UHF station to suspend broadcasting and return to the air. Live programming also returned, with a religious program and local news and weather.

== A shocking loss; closure ==
Just as it seemed like the FCC was about to designate the four channel 9 applications for hearing, the commission, on a 4–3 vote, delivered a body blow to the four applicants in June when it proposed substituting UHF channel 30 for the newly assigned VHF channel 9 as part of a deintermixture plan to reduce areas where VHF and UHF stations competed. Elmira joined Evansville, Indiana; Fresno, California; Hartford, Connecticut; Madison, Wisconsin; and Peoria and Springfield, Illinois, as cities where the FCC proposed a change in channel assignments to deintermix the area. Business leaders, U.S. representative W. Sterling Cole, and all four channel 9 applicants huddled to discuss next moves. The combined interests agreed to start a public campaign. Veterans filed the first formal protest, claiming that "the terrain around Elmira is not UHF terrain" with few line-of-sight transmission paths. Meanwhile, an educational television group supported the FCC plan on the grounds that it would support UHF development, and a group in Syracuse supported the idea of moving channel 9 to that city.

In January 1957, the four applicants were suddenly reduced to one. The Star-Gazette dropped out, while Television Associates of Elmira and Veterans Broadcasting each took ownership stakes in WTVE's channel 9 application. However, the commission affirmed its original decision in a 4–2 vote in February late and made Elmira an all-UHF market with channels 18, 24, and 30. Two weeks earlier, on February 13, WTVE shut down, with Cassel citing losses of over $350,000 in 44 months of operation and an inability to secure network programming, compounded by the September 1956 launch of WSYE-TV, the satellite station of WSYR-TV. The channel 24 permit and channel 9 application were withdrawn at the end of 1958.

The transmitter site at Comfort Hill was revived by FM radio station WENY-FM in 1965, reusing WTVE's former tower; several other FM stations and translators use the mast. WENI-FM continues to broadcast from the site today on this frequency. (Note: However, it is a separate license, the original WENY-FM having become WCBF 96.1.)
