= WENY =

WENY may refer to:

- WENY-TV, a television station (channel 35, virtual 36) licensed to serve Elmira, New York, United States
- WMAJ (AM), a radio station (1230 AM) licensed to serve Elmira, New York, which held the call sign WENY from 1939 to 2023
- WCIG, a radio station (97.7 FM) licensed to serve Big Flats, New York, which held the call sign WENY-FM from 2017 to 2021
- WENI-FM, a radio station (92.7 FM) licensed to serve South Waverly, Pennsylvania, United States, which held the call sign WENY-FM in 2017
- WCBF (FM), a radio station (96.1 FM) licensed to serve Elmira, New York, which held the call sign WENY-FM from the mid-1960s to the late 1970s, and from 1991 to 2017
