= WENI =

WENI may refer to:

- WENI (AM), a radio station (1450 AM) licensed to serve Corning, New York, United States
- WENI-FM, a radio station (92.7 FM) licensed to serve South Waverley, Pennsylvania, United States
- WCIG, a radio station (97.7 FM) licensed to serve Big Flats, New York, which held the call sign WENI-FM from 2005 to 2017
- Weni the Elder An ancient Egyptian official during Egypt's 6th dynasty
