= WCBA =

WCBA may refer to:

- Warrington College of Business Administration
- West Coast Baseball Association, a league which lasted only two months in 1946
- Westchester County Bar Association, based in White Plains, New York
- Western Counties Baseball Association, part of Baseball Ontario in Canada
- Women's Chinese Basketball Association, the pre-eminent women's professional basketball league in China
- WCB-Alberta, the workers' compensation board in Alberta, Canada
- We Came Bearing Arms, a Belgian metalcore band

Among radio callsigns, WCBA may refer to:

- WCBA (AM), a defunct radio station (1350 AM) formerly licensed to serve South Corning, New York, United States
- WPHD (FM), a sister station on the 98.7 frequency, which formerly held the WCBA-FM call sign
