= WNGZ =

WNGZ may refer to:

- WNGZ (AM), a radio station (1490 AM) licensed to serve Watkins Glen, New York, United States
- WCIM (FM), a radio station (104.9 FM) licensed to serve Montour Falls, New York, which held the call sign WNGZ from 1982 to 2020
