= WNKI =

Radio station in Corning, New York

- Corning, New York; United States
- Broadcast area: Corning–Elmira area
- Frequency: 106.1 MHz
- Branding: Wink 106

Programming
- Format: Contemporary hit radio

Ownership
- Owner: Seven Mountains Media; (Southern Belle, LLC)
- Sister stations: WCBF, WMTT-FM, WNGZ, WPHD, WZHD

History
- First air date: 1947
- Former call signs: WKNP (1947–1980); WCLI-FM (1980–1980); WZKZ (1980–1993)
- Call sign meaning: Transposal of letters in word "wink"

Technical information
- Licensing authority: FCC
- Facility ID: 53611
- Class: B
- ERP: 40,000 watts
- HAAT: 162 meters
- Transmitter coordinates: 42°9′43.2″N 77°2′13.8″W
- Translators: W239BQ 95.7 MHz (Elmira); W300BX 107.9 MHz (Wellsboro, PA)

Links
- Public license information: Public file; LMS
- Webcast: Listen Live
- Website: wink106.com

WNKI (106.1 FM, "Wink 106") is a radio station broadcasting a Top 40 (CHR) format. Licensed to Corning, New York, United States, the station serves the Corning–Elmira area, and is the Nielsen Audio #1 rated station in the market. The station is currently owned by Seven Mountains Media, which closed on its $3.9 million acquisition of the station April 1, 2019, from Community Broadcasters, LLC.

== History ==
The station went on the air as WKNP in 1947, under the ownership of the Corning Leader newspaper. Its original frequency was 95.1 FM. By 1950, it had moved to another frequency, the current 106.1 FM. A sister AM station, WCLI, signed on in 1947.

It had broadcast from a building at Erie Avenue (now Dennison Parkway) and Walnut Street in Corning. The Erie Railroad mainline passed nearby, and passing freight and passenger trains used to shake the building along with the recorded music on the turntables, according to Leader columnist Dick Peer. Disc jockey Bob Shaddock, who became one of the market's iconic radio personalities, developed a skill of picking up the needle from the 78 RPM records and making announcements while trains passed, according to Peer.

The newspaper sold the stations in 1953 to Radio Corning Inc. owned by Gordon Jenkins. WCLI duplicated much of the programming of 1450 WCLI. In May 1979, Jack King purchased Radio Corning Inc. and on October 20, 1980, the station changed its call sign to WZKZ. Known as KZ-106, the station played a live-assist automated adult contemporary format. It was the top-rated station in the Elmira-Corning market for much of the decade.

In 1993, Pro Radio Inc. bought the stations. The FM call letters were switched on Oct. 8, 1993, to the current WNKI The change was controversial in that several popular personalities were let go as Pro Radio launched a top 40 format under the name of Wink 106 with a staff of air personalities, who were popular on other stations in the market. The change made some unwanted headlines when a presumably irate listener entered the main office (then at 99 W. First St.) after hours and doused it with fox urine. The KZ brand, WZKZ call sign and country format would move west to Alfred, New York, where it would remain from 1999 to 2021.

In 1995, Pro Radio sold to Corning Sabrecom (part of Sabre Communications) for $1.85 Million which moved the stations to Elmira Heights. In 1997, the AM and FM split, with Sabre Communications selling WCLI to Eolin Broadcasting, which also owned WCBA, WCBA-FM, and WGMM.

On May 6, 2013, it was announced that Backyard Broadcasting was selling the Elmira/Corning and Olean, NY clusters, including WNKI/WPGI/WNGZ/WRCE/WWLZ, to Community Broadcasters, LLC in Watertown, New York. The sale was consummated on August 26, 2013, at a price of $3.6 million.

Seven Mountains Media acquired WNKI in January 2019.
