= WPEL =

WPEL may refer to:

- WPEL (AM), a radio station (800 AM) licensed to Montrose, Pennsylvania, United States
- WPEL-FM, a radio station (96.5 FM) licensed to Montrose, Pennsylvania, United States
- Wikipedia:External links
