= WQIX =

WQIX may refer to:

- WQIX-LD, a low-power television station (channel 25) licensed to Vidalia, Georgia
- WCID, a radio station (100.9) licensed to Horseheads, New York, which held the call sign WQIX from 1969 to 1995
- WPGO, a radio station (820 AM) licensed to Horseheads, New York, which held the call sign WQIX from 1996 to 1997
- WKHT, a radio station (104.5 FM) licensed to Belton, South Carolina, which held the call sign WQIX from 1998 to 2000
