= WPIE =

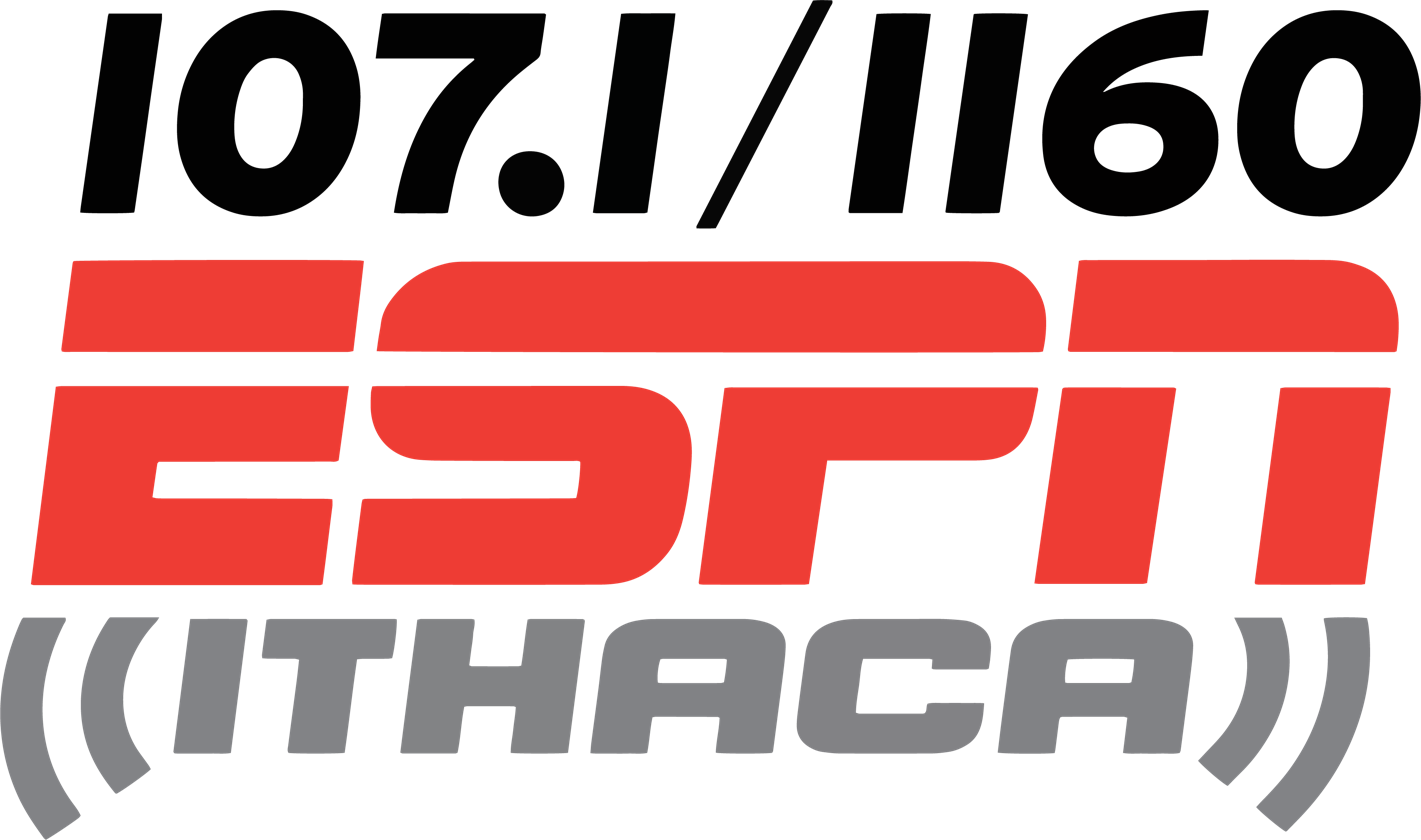
- Lansing, New York; United States
- Broadcast area: Finger Lakes
- Frequencies: 107.1 MHz (HD Radio) & 1160 kHz
- Branding: ESPN Ithaca 107.1/1160

Programming
- Format: Sports
- Affiliations: ESPN Radio

Ownership
- Owner: Vizella Media LLC

History
- First air date: 1989
- Call sign meaning: Pie: co-founder's wife was a baker

Technical information
- Licensing authority: FCC
- Facility ID: 52124
- Class: B
- Power: 5,000 watts (daytime); 220 watts (nighttime); 447 watts PSRA
- Transmitter coordinates: 42°32′42″N 76°42′39″W
- Translators: 107.1 W296CP (Ithaca); 107.1 W296DH (Watkins Glen)

Links
- Public license information: Public file; LMS
- Webcast: Listen Live
- Website: www.espnithaca.com

WPIE signed on in 1989 as Tompkins County's third AM radio station and the Ithaca, New York market's 12th station on both radio bands. It broadcasts on 1160 kHz. Since November 2010, it has been locally owned and operated by Vizella Media and has been an ESPN Radio affiliate with national sports coverage, local coverage of the Cornell Big Red, Ithaca Bombers, Cortland Red Dragons, TC3 Panthers, and Section IV high school sports, and regional coverage of the Syracuse Orange and New York Yankees.

== History ==
The Federal Communications Commission licensed the station on April 16, 1986, as WJCU to Elmira, New York-area radio personality Joel Clawson and local engineer William Sitzman. Two Trumansburg businessmen also were silent partners in the venture.

About three months later, the FCC approved a callsign change to WPIE, which was chosen in honor of Clawson's wife, a baker.

The station signed on in 1989, airing an easy listening format that featured music from abroad obtained by Sitzman's programming company. Some of the music was not available commercially in the United States, and gave an alternative to common pop music heard in the US. Some of the music was also from custom recording sessions.

This is an example of the original WPIE logo

The studio was in a former gasoline station in the hamlet of Jacksonville, New York, about midway between Trumansburg and Ithaca on Route 96. One of the gas station's tanks had leaked several years earlier, rendering the water at the studio unpotable.

In 1991, WPIE began airing Northeast Satellite Entertainment's adult contemporary programming at night. The station began adding limited AC songs to the regular daytime format around that time.

The station began airing Trumansburg High School football and basketball games, as well as South Seneca High School football, in 1992. Sports coverage was expanded the next year, when the Elmira-based Pembrook Pines Media Group bought the station.

The new owner brought a new format, country music, which garnered the station more listeners and advertisers.

The station's sports coverage also attracted listeners. The high-school sports coverage, which featured Lansing instead of South Seneca after 1993, was complemented by New York Yankees baseball, Buffalo Bills football, Motor Racing Network, and Syracuse University football and basketball. The Yankees were an immediate hit as they had not been on the air in the Ithaca market since the 1980s despite their popularity in the community.

Within a couple of years, the station moved into a new studio at its tower site, off Seneca Road in Trumansburg.

In the late 1990s, Pembrook Pines switched WPIE to an all-sports format, featuring ESPN Radio, and moved its main studio into its Elmira headquarters, which included the studios of all-sports WELM, easy-listening WEHH, urban contemporary WLVY and country WOKN, all of which serve the Elmira-Corning market rather than Ithaca.

Originally, WPIE and WELM aired different satellite-delivered programming with the exception of major sports broadcasts. Eventually, the stations began simulcasting, splitting only for WPIE's Ithaca-area local sports broadcasts.

In 2007, the station resumed its affiliation with Syracuse University. WPIE has also aired some Ithaca College sports and Ithaca High School sports.

In August 2010, WPIE entered a joint sales agreement with Taughannock Media, later Vizella Media, owned by former WIII/WKRT manager Todd Mallinson and his wife, in anticipation of selling the station. The station dropped the Buffalo Bills in favor of the New York Jets in the fall of 2010.

In November 2010, WPIE was purchased by Taughannock Media, later Vizella Media, and moved its studio and offices to a new facility in Lansing, NY, though the towers and transmitter remain in Trumansburg. Many improvements had been made, including new studio and remote broadcasting equipment and transmitter upgrades. Shortly after relocating, the station added an afternoon local sports talk show - "Between the Lines" - to its programming lineup.

In January 2011, WPIE became the flagship home of Cornell Wrestling broadcasts. In September 2011, it added local high school and local football sports talk show "Game Day" to its fall lineup on Saturday mornings.

WPIE airs nearly 70 high school play-by-play broadcasts throughout the year, including regular season and postseason football, soccer, basketball, hockey, baseball, and lacrosse games. Past broadcasts have included numerous state championships, including titles for Lansing baseball (2012), Newark Valley football (2016), Moravia boys basketball (2017 and 2024), Watkins Glen girls basketball (2017), Lansing boys soccer (2017 and 2018), Marathon boys soccer (2019), Newfield boys basketball (2022), and Moravia girls basketball (2024).

In November 2013, WPIE added an FM translator on 107.1 MHz, in addition to 1160 AM. WPIE rebranded as ESPN Ithaca 1160/107.1.

In June 2017, ESPN Ithaca added an FM translator on 107.1 MHz near Watkins Glen.

WPIE's original two-tower directional antenna system has been modified for full time omnidirectional operation using the east tower as active radiator. This became possible following shutdown of the first-adjacent 1150 kHz station at Utica, NY and co-channel 1160 kHz station at Lehighton, PA, and was relicensed in May 2025. The west tower remains in place as a rental structure and has been detuned to lessen its effect on the AM radiation pattern.

ESPN Ithaca is an 24-time award winner by the New York State Broadcasters Association for Excellence in Broadcasting.
