= WPGM =

WPGM may refer to:

- WPGM (AM), a radio station (1570 AM) licensed to Danville, Pennsylvania, United States
- WPGM-FM, a radio station (96.7 FM) licensed to Danville, Pennsylvania, United States
