= WECT (New York) =

Elmira, New York; United States
- Channels: Analog: 18 (UHF)

Programming
- Affiliations: NBC

Ownership
- Owner: El-Cor Television, Inc.

History
- First air date: September 30, 1953
- Last air date: May 27, 1954
- Call sign meaning: Name of the owner, referencing Elmira and Corning

Technical information
- ERP: 5 kW (Note: Authorized for 58 kW)
- HAAT: 238 m (780 ft)
- Transmitter coordinates: 42°6′22″N 76°52′16″W

WECT (channel 18) was a television station in Elmira, New York, United States. Owned by El-Cor Television, Inc., it was Elmira's second station (after WTVE (channel 24)), broadcasting from September 1953 to May 1954, but shut down for financial reasons after seven months of telecasting.

== History ==
El-Cor Television, Inc., a company whose shareholders were the Corning Leader and Elmira Star-Gazette, was formed in September 1952 and applied to the Federal Communications Commission (FCC) for a construction permit for channel 18; both newspapers abandoned their own applications for channels 18 and 24, respectively. El-Cor was granted the permit on February 26, 1953, but told it could not start construction until Elmira-Corning Broadcasting Corporation divested its stake in WELM, as WELM and WENY—the stations owned by stockholders in the two newspapers—had overlapping coverage. The FCC permitted construction activities to begin on March 25 once WELM was sold to Radio Elmira, Inc. At a site on Hawley Hill, work began on the integrated studio and transmitter site, and an affiliation agreement with NBC was signed in July. In addition to network shows, the station would have two cameras for the production of local programming.

By early September, the telecast of the World Series was the primary goal for start-up of the new channel 18. This was successfully achieved on September 30, when WECT made its first telecast, rebroadcasting the NBC feed of the first game of the series from WSYR-TV (channel 3) in Syracuse, New York. After the Series, the station temporarily went off the air; beginning October 7, it broadcast only a test pattern and select NBC network shows until October 19, when the first Elmira-based local program went out; on October 22, a formal dedication program marked the start of regular broadcasting activities.

On May 27, 1954, WECT suspended broadcast operations. The station cited "consistent losses" in its request to leave the air. El-Cor then announced in September that it had returned the permit to the FCC and would not resume; the company sold the site in 1955 to a man who planned to use the transmitter building for residential purposes and lease the tower to a cable television company which would use it as a receiving station. Two proposals were then received to run the station as a repeater of another, one from WSYR-TV and another from WNBF-TV in Binghamton, New York; the Binghamton station dropped its bid, leaving the path open for WSYR-TV to be granted a new construction permit for the channel. WSYE-TV, a near-full-time repeater of the Syracuse station, began broadcasting on September 15, 1956. The station, which eventually became an independent unit as WETM-TV, continued to maintain studios on Hawley Hill until 1988 and retains its transmitter on the high-elevation site.
