= WPGO =

- Horseheads, New York; United States
- Broadcast area: Southern Tier of New York
- Frequency: 820 kHz

Programming
- Format: Christian radio
- Affiliations: SRN News

Ownership
- Owner: Montrose Broadcasting Corporation
- Sister stations: WBGM, WJSA-FM, WPEL, WPEL-FM, WPGM, WPGM-FM

History
- First air date: 1966
- Former call signs: WIQT (1988–1996); WQIX (1996–1997); WWLZ (1997–2020); WMTT (2020–2021)

Technical information
- Licensing authority: FCC
- Facility ID: 10687
- Class: B
- Power: 4,100 watts (day); 850 watts (night)
- Transmitter coordinates: 42°09′14″N 76°50′47″W

Links
- Public license information: Public file; LMS
- Webcast: Listen live
- Website: wpel.org

WPGO (820 AM) is a non-commercial radio station licensed to Horseheads, New York, United States, serving the Elmira-Corning market. Owned by Montrose Broadcasting Corporation, it airs a Christian radio format, mixing talk and teaching programs with Christian music. Much of the programming is simulcast from WPEL-FM in Montrose, Pennsylvania. The studios are on High Street in Montrose.

== History ==
=== 1000 AM ===
The station signed on the air in 1966. Its original call sign was WIQT, with studios on Hanover Square in Horseheads. It was a daytimer, broadcasting on 1000 kHz and required to go off the air at sunset to protect a station on 1000 AM in Chicago from interference. It was the fifth station to sign on in Chemung County. It played beautiful music in its early years, airing quarter hour sweeps of mostly instrumental soft music.

WIQT served as the headquarters of a flood-emergency network during the Hurricane Agnes flood of June 22 and 23, 1972, under the direction of chief engineer C. Michael Scullin and program director David G. Ridenour. It was the only Chemung County station that remained on the during the disaster, which kept all other stations off the air for over a week. Personnel from other stations volunteered to work alongside their WIQT colleagues to broadcast emergency information 24 hours a day, by special dispensation of the FCC to extend the station's daytime license. A U.S. Army communications command post was set up in their studios, and a CB radio network node as well, for use by civil authorities.

Later in 1972, sister station WQIX 100.9 FM went on the air. It aired a country music format.

=== Move to 820 AM ===
WIQT, owned by Elmira retailer Manny Panosian, moved down the dial to 820 kHz on January 7, 1988. It also moved into new studios in Downtown Elmira. The relocation had been scheduled for a later date, but was expedited after the partial collapse of an external wall at the Horseheads location. Its former frequency and studios were picked up by a new Christian radio station, WLNL. Both stations kept Horseheads as their city of license.

In Elmira, WIQT played classic country to complement the country music format of its sister station. Its slogan "820 American" came about after program director David Rockwell submitted a list of possible slogans to general manager Ron Ferro and Ferro misread "820 AM."

Sabre Communications, which owned WCLI and Wink 106, entered into a limited marketing agreement to manage WIQT and WQIX late in 1994. It bought the stations several months later, enabling Sabre to move popular talk shows from WCLI to the more powerful WIQT. Sabre merged with Backyard Broadcasting in 2002. Backyard sold all of its New York assets to Community Broadcasters, LLC effective August 26, 2013, at a price of $3.6 million. Those assets were then spun off to Pennsylvania-based broadcaster Seven Mountains Media effective April 1, 2019.

WIQT changed its call sign to WQIX on January 17, 1996. Its sister station added the -FM suffix. On February 21, 1997, it switched its call sign to WWLZ.

=== Talk and Classic Rock ===
As WWLZ, the station aired a talk radio format that aired the Premiere Networks lineup (Glenn Beck Radio Program, The Rush Limbaugh Show, The Sean Hannity Show and Coast to Coast AM) during the workday and overnight, Westwood One programs (First Light, Imus in the Morning, The Mark Levin Show, The John Batchelor Show) during the evening and in morning drive, MRN races and Elmira Jackals hockey.

On January 13, 2020, WWLZ dropped the talk format to simulcast classic rock-formatted WMTT (94.7 FM), which was in the process of being sold to Seven Mountains Media. On July 3, 2020, WWLZ changed its call sign to WMTT and rebranded as "101 the Met" as part of a five-station format swap, which made 820/101.3 the main signals for the Met, while adding a simulcast sister station at the former WPGI 100.9 (renamed WMTT-FM).

=== Christian radio ===
When Seven Mountains Media announced it would acquire the New York assets of its primary rival Waypoint Media, WMTT was included among the licenses that would be donated to Family Life Network, along with WGGO in Salamanca, New York; as Family Life does not operate AM stations, has historically declined to purchase such stations (it declined to purchase WBVG or WFBL when involved in a similar swap in 2015), and initially did not apply to change the station's call sign, the fate of WGGO after the swap was unknown, with industry speculation that WMTT and WGGO might go silent. The FM translator will go to Seven Mountains Media and will no longer simulcast WMTT. The sale closed June 1, 2021.

In July 2021, the station went silent. As Seven Mountains Media retained rights to the WMTT call sign (which moved back to 94.7), Family Life changed the call sign to WPGO, matching that of WGGO (but not those of the other Family Life FM stations, all of which start with WCG, WCI or WCO). Neither WPGO nor WGGO were identified in Family Life's list of present or future affiliates. broadcast reporter Scott Fybush stated shortly after the transfer that Family Life intended to sell off WPGO and WGGO to another broadcaster in the near future.

On August 26, 2021, Family Life spun WPGO off to Montrose Broadcasting Corporation, a Pennsylvania-based religious broadcaster that owns WPEL, WPGM-FM and WBGM. The price tag was $50,000. The sale was consummated on December 15, 2021.

=== FM translator ===
In addition to the main station broadcasting at 820 kHz, the programming was, prior to 2021, relayed on FM translator W267CJ at 101.3 in Horseheads. That translator now rebroadcasts WENI 1240 AM in Corning.
