= WLVY =

WLVY may refer to:

- WLVY (AM), a radio station (1600 AM) licensed to serve Elmira Heights-Horseheads, New York, United States
- WCIH (FM), a radio station (94.3 FM) licensed to serve Elmira, New York, which held the call sign WLVY from 1976 to 2023
