= WCBF (FM) =

Radio station in Elmira, New York

Coordinates: 42.032°N 76.784°W

- Elmira, New York; United States
- Frequency: 96.1 MHz (HD Radio)
- Branding: 95-96-97 Bigfoot Country

Programming
- Format: Country
- Subchannels: HD2: Classic hits (WPHD simulcast); HD3: Rhythmic hot AC "Jamz 101.7"; HD4: Classic hits (WNGZ simulcast)

Ownership
- Owner: Seven Mountains Media; (Southern Belle, LLC)
- Sister stations: WMTT-FM, WNGZ, WNKI, WPHD, WZHD

History
- First air date: 1965 (as WENY-FM at 92.7)
- Former call signs: WENY-FM (1965–1977); WLEZ (1977–1991); WENY-FM (1991–2017); WPHD (2017–2020)
- Former frequencies: 92.7 MHz (1965–2017)
- Call sign meaning: "Bigfoot"

Technical information
- Licensing authority: FCC
- Facility ID: 71509
- Class: A
- ERP: 1,300 watts
- HAAT: 216 meters (709 ft)
- Translators: 93.1 W226BA (Elmira, relays HD4); 93.5 W228DN (Corning, relays HD4); 101.7 W269BK (Horseheads, relays HD3); 103.3 W277DW (Elmira, relays HD2); 107.9 W300DH (Corning, relays HD3)

Links
- Public license information: Public file; LMS
- Webcast: Listen live; Listen live (HD3)
- Website: bigfootcountryradio.com myradiojamz.com (HD3)

WCBF (96.1 MHz, "95-96-97 Bigfoot Country") is an FM radio station in Elmira, New York, United States. It is owned by Seven Mountains Media and airs a country music format.

== History ==
The station signed on the air as WENY-FM in 1965 at 92.7 FM as a sister station to WENY. The call letters WENY-FM had previously been assigned to another station in Elmira. It was licensed to the Elmira Star-Gazette, Incorporated, and began broadcasting November 1, 1948, on 106.9 MHz. It was a sister station to WENY, an AM station.

In 1977, the station changed its call letters to WLEZ, and was playing adult contemporary music. Known as EZ-92, the station was automated for most of the broadcast day, but had a popular morning show through the 1980s hosted by Chris Faber.

The station reclaimed its WENY-FM call sign on November 4, 1991. It also switched to a satellite-delivered adult contemporary format as an affiliate of the Northeast Satellite Entertainment network.

Longtime owner Howard Green sold the station to White Broadcasting in 2000. Under a limited marketing agreement, the station was managed by Eolin Broadcasting Inc., which also owned talk radio station WCLI, WCBA-FM (adult contemporary), WCBA (adult standards) and WGMM (oldies). White sold the station to EBI in 2001

EBI moved the station to its headquarters in South Corning and began simulcasting airing WCBA-FM programming on WENY. The stations were known as the Crystal Radio Network. That nomenclature came from WCBA-FM, which had been known as "Crystal 98.7" for a few years.

In 2003, EBI sold all of the stations to Route 81 Radio, based in Hazleton, Pennsylvania. Route 81 switched WCBA-FM's frequency to 97.7 (which was WGMM's) and its calls to WENI. The stations still air the same adult contemporary programming, but now are known as Magic 92.7 and 97.7. Route 81 dissolved and the stations ended up in the hands of William and Paige Christian's Sound Communications.

In 2017, Sound Communications filed to swap the license for WENY-FM to Kevin Fitzgerald and George Hawras' Europa Communications in exchange for the license for WPHD, in a move speculated to allow the Christians the opportunity to acquire another station in the Elmira-Corning area (South Waverly, Pennsylvania, the community to which WPHD was licensed, is located just outside the designated market area). The swap was consummated on November 15, 2017, along with the formats. In addition, the stations swapped call signs on November 20, 2017. On December 8, 2017, WPHD moved from 92.7 FM to 96.1 FM. (info taken from stationintel.com) On June 25, 2020, the station changed its call sign to WCBF. On July 3, 2020, the station adopted a country music format branded "Bigfoot Country", and the WPHD call sign and classic hits format moved to 104.9 FM.

== HD Radio ==
On May 24, 2018, WPHD launched two formats on their HD Radio subchannels—WPHD-HD2 was airing a rhythmic contemporary format, branded as "Hot 102.9" (simulcast on translator W275BA 102.9 FM Elmira) and WPHD-HD3 was airing an alternative rock format, branded as "93 The Drive" (simulcast on translator W226BA 93.1 FM Elmira).

On January 6, 2020, WPHD-HD3/W226BA changed their format from alternative rock to a simulcast of mainstream rock-formatted WNGZ 104.9 FM Montour Falls.

== Translators ==
WCBF also broadcasts on the following FM translators:

Broadcast translators for WCBF
Call sign	Frequency	City of license	FID	ERP (W)	Class	FCC info
W226BA	93.1 FM	Elmira, New York	156749	250	D	LMS
W228DN	93.5 FM	Corning, New York	156918	110	D	LMS
W269BK	101.7 FM	Horseheads, New York	140269	80	D	LMS
W277DW	103.3 FM	Elmira, New York	8554	250	D	LMS
W300DH	107.9 FM	Corning, New York	140304	200	D	LMS

W277DW relays WCBF-HD2; W269BK and W300DH relay WCBF-HD3; W226BA and W228DN relay WCBF-HD4.
