= WMAJ (AM) =

Radio station in Elmira, New York

Coordinates: 42°04′29″N 76°46′47″W

- Elmira, New York; United States
- Frequency: 1230 kHz
- Branding: Magic 106.7/106.9

Programming
- Format: Adult contemporary

Ownership
- Owner: Seven Mountains Media; (Southern Belle, LLC)
- Sister stations: WENI, WENI-FM, WPHD

History
- First air date: November 26, 1939 (at 1200)
- Former call signs: WENY (1939–2023)
- Former frequencies: 1200 kHz (1939–1941)
- Call sign meaning: "Magic"

Technical information
- Licensing authority: FCC
- Facility ID: 71510
- Class: C
- Power: 1,000 watts day; 910 watts night
- Translators: 106.7 W294BU (Corning); 106.9 W295BY (Elmira)

Links
- Public license information: Public file; LMS
- Webcast: Listen live
- Website: twintiersmagic.com

WMAJ (1230 kHz) is an AM radio station licensed to Elmira, New York, United States, and serving the Elmira–Corning radio market. It is owned by Seven Mountains Media and airs an adult contemporary format. It broadcasts at 1,000 watts at day and 910 watts at night from studios in Corning, New York.

== History ==
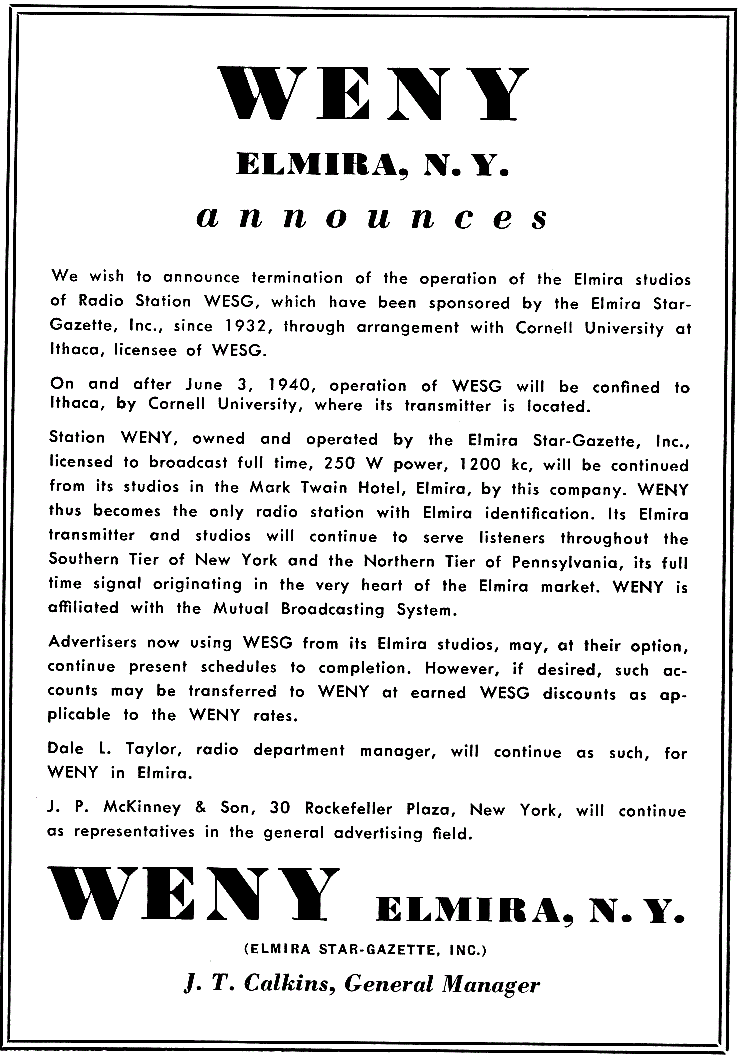
In 1940 the Star-Gazette ended its eight year lease of Cornell University's WESG in Ithaca and consolidated all its radio operations at WENY.

Test broadcasts began on November 1, 1939, reaching states such as Idaho and Florida. WMAJ officially started its broadcasts on November 26, operated by the Elmira Star-Gazette with the call sign WENY and was affiliated with the Mutual Broadcasting System. It was initially assigned to 1200 kHz, with studios in the Mark Twain Hotel on Market Street in Elmira.

WENY was the third Star-Gazette affiliated radio station. In the spring of 1932, the newspaper had briefly assumed control of WBGF in Glen Falls, and changed that station's call letters to WESG, with plans to move the station to Elmira. However, a short time later the newspaper instead entered into a long-term lease with Cornell University to operate its station in Ithaca from the newspaper's studios in Elmira. At this time, the Cornell station changed its call letters from WEAI to WESG (now WHCU).

The newspaper's leasing of WESG was terminated in mid-1940, and WENY became the Star-Gazette's sole radio outlet. In 1941, WENY moved to 1230 kHz, as part of the reassignments made under the provisions of the North American Regional Broadcasting Agreement (NARBA), where it remains today.

Former sister station WENY-FM was launched in the 1960s.

In the 1950s, 1960s, and 1970s, WENY was a full-service operation with an extensive air staff and local news department and by far the dominant radio station in the Elmira market.

In the 1970s, as a Top 40 music station, WENY adopted the slogan "We're the One", a play on the Orleans song "Still The One", which was popular at the time and was used in promotions for ABC television, of which then-sister station WENY-TV 36 was an affiliate. The members of Orleans also were natives of the Elmira and Ithaca areas.

The station kept playing music until the early 1990s, when it switched to talk radio. That was when it dropped Voice of the People, a long-running local talk show that ran weeknights at 6 p.m. Ted Hodge was the host of Voice of the People in the late 1970s.

Longtime owner Howard Green sold the station cluster to Lilly Broadcasting in 1999. As Lilly (and its predecessor, SJL Broadcast Management) was primarily a television company at the time (it would eventually reenter radio in 2019), Lilly sold off the radio stations to White Broadcasting in 2000, which switched the AM side to an oldies format. Under a limited marketing agreement, the station was managed by Eolin Broadcasting Inc., which also owned talk radio station WCLI, WCBA-FM (adult contemporary), WCBA (adult standards) and WGMM (oldies). White sold the station to EBI in 2001, at which time the television station was separated from the radio stations.

EBI moved the station to its headquarters in South Corning and switched WENY back to talk radio, simulcasting with WCLI.

In 2003, EBI sold all of the stations to Route 81 Radio, based in Hazleton, Pennsylvania. When Route 81 Radio went defunct, WS Media, a shell company for William and Paige Christian (owners of TV station WYDC), bought the stations. To circumvent ownership caps, the Christians each operate some of the stations under each individual owner's name. In November 2019, Standard Media struck an agreement to buy all of the Christians' broadcast assets, including WENY.

WENY carried a mostly syndicated lineup. Frankly Speaking with Frank Acomb, a local program, was heard during morning drive time. The station simulcast local high school sports with WGMM, with Denis Sweeney on play-by-play.

Though WENY shared the same "Patriot" brand as other Waypoint conservative talk stations WGGO and WSHY, it did not share the same lineup of hosts, because WWLZ, a competing station owned by Seven Mountains Media, held the rights to almost all the shows on those stations in the Elmira market for over a decade. The lineup became available to WENY in 2020 when WWLZ changed formats.

In June 2021, WENY changed their format from talk (which continued on WENI) to adult contemporary, branded as "Magic 106.7/106.9" (the format and "Magic" branding moved from WENI-FM 92.7 and WENY-FM 97.7). This returned WENY to its earlier years as a music station.

On February 13, 2023, the station changed its call sign to WMAJ.

== Notable former staff ==
- John Kobylt
- Carl Hausman
- Horn in the Morn
- Ron Ferro
- Steve Christy
- Dick Irland
