= WCID =

Radio station in Horseheads, New York, United States

- Enfield, New York; United States
- Broadcast area: Ithaca, New York area
- Frequency: 101.1 MHz
- Branding: Family Life Network

Programming
- Format: Christian radio

Ownership
- Owner: Family Life Ministries; (Family Life Ministries, Inc.)
- Sister stations: WCIM

History
- First air date: 1970 (as WQIX)
- Former call signs: WQIX (1969–1995); WPGI (1995–2020); WMTT-FM (2020–2021)
- Former frequencies: 100.9 FM (1970 - 2022)

Technical information
- Licensing authority: FCC
- Facility ID: 10688
- Class: A
- ERP: 3,800 watts
- HAAT: 75 meters (246 ft)
- Transmitter coordinates: 42°12′00″N 76°51′30″W
- Translator: (92.5 MHz) W223BR (Ithaca)

Links
- Public license information: Public file; LMS
- Webcast: Listen Live
- Website: www.familylife.org

WCID (101.1 FM) is a radio station broadcasting a Christian radio format from Family Life Network. Licensed to Enfield, New York, United States, the station serves the Ithaca area. The station is owned by Family Life Ministries.

== History ==
The station originated in 1970, with call letters WQIX, with a modern country format. Studios were in Horseheads, shared with sister AM WIQT, and transmitter on Prospect Hill north of the village. Construction was by Chief Engineer C Michael Scullin with John Mulligan. It was owned then by retailer Manny Panosian and John Arikian, dba Chemung County Radio. Program Director was David G. Ridenour and General Manager Bob Johnson. During the first part of the 21st century, WPGI shared the "Big Pig" branding with sister station WPIG in Olean, New York, both stations being owned by Backyard Broadcasting.

Along with the rest of Backyard Broadcasting's New York assets, the station was sold to Community Broadcasters, LLC effective August 26, 2013, at a price of $3.6 million. On October 1, 2013, the then-WPGI dropped its cross-branding with WPIG, as well as all of the station's jocks, and took on the brand "100.9 The Wolf" with the same format.

WPGI, along with the other stations in Community Broadcasters' Southern Tier portfolio, was sold to Seven Mountains Media in January 2019.

On July 3, 2020, WPGI flipped to classic rock as "101 The Met", as part of a five-station format swap, where WMTT moved from 94.7 to 820/101.3, with 100.9 starting to simulcast the new WMTT. WPGI had changed its call letters to WMTT-FM on June 25, 2020, to reflect this change. WPGI's former country format moved to 94.7 (renamed WQBF), WCBF (96.1), and WOBF (97.1) as "95-96-97 Bigfoot Country".

On June 15, 2021, WMTT-FM changed its format from classic rock (which moved back to 94.7, as well as WENI-FM 92.7) to Family Life Network's religious format under new WCID calls. Formerly at 100.9 FM licensed to Horseheads, New York which served Elmira-Corning area, WCID moved to its current 101.1 FM frequency around 2022 in its new city of license at Enfield, NY located near Ithaca.
