= WNGZ (AM) =

Radio station in Watkins Glen, New York

- Watkins Glen, New York; United States
- Broadcast area: Corning, New York; Elmira, New York; Lansing, New York; Ithaca, New York
- Frequency: 1490 kHz
- Branding: My Cool Radio

Programming
- Format: Classic hits
- Affiliations: Compass Media Networks; Buffalo Bills Radio Network

Ownership
- Owner: Seven Mountains Media; (Southern Belle, LLC)
- Sister stations: WCBF, WMTT-FM, WNKI, WPHD, WZHD

History
- First air date: 1968
- Former call signs: WGMF (1968–1999); WBZD (1999); WGMF (1999–2004); WTYX (2004–2008); WRCE (2008–2020)
- Former frequencies: 1500 kHz (1968–1984)
- Call sign meaning: Wings

Technical information
- Licensing authority: FCC
- Facility ID: 49446
- Class: C
- Power: 880 watts
- Transmitter coordinates: 42°21′8.3″N 76°52′4.9″W
- Translators: 93.1 W226BA (Elmira); 93.5 W228DN (Corning)
- Repeater: 96.1 WCBF-HD4 (Elmira)

Links
- Public license information: Public file; LMS
- Webcast: Listen live
- Website: mycoolradio.com

⁰

WNGZ (1490 AM) is a radio station licensed to Watkins Glen, New York, United States. The station is owned by Seven Mountains Media and airs a classic hits format under the "Cool Radio" branding. The AM station first signed on in 1968 and has undergone numerous call letter and format changes since 1990. From 2014 to 2020 the AM station carried a classic country format.

== History ==
The station originally signed on in 1968 as WGMF (for Watkins Glen/Montour Falls), a daytime-only station on 1500 kHz. Initially airing at the same frequency as clear-channel station WTOP in Washington, D.C., WGMF later moved to 1490 kHz to broadcast 24 hours a day.

In the late 1980s, while still a daytimer, WGMF simulcast the signal from WNGZ (104.9 FM), which, due to topography, had poor reception in Watkins Glen (WNGZ was licensed to nearby Montour Falls but targeted to listeners in the Elmira-Corning area). In 1990, WGMF originated a locally programmed oldies format as "Famous 1490". In 2004, the station aired an adult standards format as WTYX. The station was assigned the WRCE call letters by the Federal Communications Commission on January 22, 2008.

WRCE's tower collapsed on December 14, 2009, killing a worker and causing the station to go silent. A new tower was constructed in 2010 by chief engineer Benjamin Van Patten.

From June 30 to July 4, 2011, WRCE ran a simulcast of "The Bunny," a temporary radio station operated by the band Phish for the weekend-long Superball IX concert festival at Watkins Glen International. The Bunny also broadcast on Sirius XM's Jam On station and streamed on the Phish website, with an eclectic mix of music and live broadcasts of all eight concert sets performed by Phish over the weekend.

Along with the rest of Backyard Broadcasting's New York assets, WRCE was sold to Community Broadcasters, LLC effective August 26, 2013 at a price of $3.6 million.

Shortly after purchasing the station, Community Broadcasters ended the simulcast of 104.9 WNGZ and its affiliations with the Motor Racing Network, Performance Racing Network, Indy Racing Network, and Watkins Glen International Raceway. The station carried the ESPN Radio Network for a very short period in 2014 before the station switched formats to a satellite-provided classic country format.

In 2019, Community Broadcasters sold its New York assets to Seven Mountains Media. On July 3, 2020, WRCE adopted an active rock format branded as "Wingz 93" and its call sign was changed to WNGZ, absorbing the format and call sign of the former WNGZ, which became FM 104.9 when that station was sold off to a religious broadcaster.

Undated, WNGZ 1490 AM dropped the Wingz 93 simulcast and switched to its current classic hits format as My Cool Radio. Its unknown when the changes took place.

== FM translators ==
Wingz 93 logo

The following FM translators simulcast WNGZ and are used in the station branding. It also provides high fidelity stereophonic sound for the format.

Broadcast translators for WNGZ
Call sign	Frequency	City of license	FID	ERP (W)	Class	FCC info
W226BA	93.1 FM	Elmira, New York	156749	250	D	LMS
W228DN	93.5 FM	Corning, New York	156918	110	D	LMS

From 2020 until undated, WNGZ 1490 AM dropped the Wingz 93 classic rock simulcast and switched to classic hits as My Cool Radio. The Wingz 93 format remains on 93.1 and 93.5 FM.
