= WCIM =

WCIM may refer to:

- WCIM (FM), a radio station (104.9 FM) licensed to serve Montour Falls, New York, United States
- WCDH, a radio station (91.5 FM) licensed to serve Shenandoah, Pennsylvania, United States, which held the call sign WCIM from 2007 to 2021
