= WCIH =

WCIH may refer to:

- WCIH (FM), a radio station (94.3 FM) licensed to serve Elmira, New York, United States
- WCDN-FM, a radio station (90.3 FM) licensed to serve Ridgebury, Pennsylvania, United States, which held the call sign WCIH from 1989 to 2023
