= WLNL =

Radio station in Horseheads, New York

- Horseheads, New York; United States
- Broadcast area: Elmira-Corning, New York
- Frequency: 1000 kHz
- Branding: The Bell

Programming
- Format: Conservative talk
- Affiliations: Salem Radio Network

Ownership
- Owner: Trinity Media, Ltd.

History
- First air date: May 7, 1967
- Former call signs: WIQT (1967–1988)
- Call sign meaning: "Light N Life"

Technical information
- Licensing authority: FCC
- Facility ID: 37481
- Class: D
- Power: 5,000 watts (day); 2,500 watts (critical hours)
- Transmitter coordinates: 42°09′14″N 76°50′47″W

Links
- Public license information: Public file; LMS
- Webcast: Listen live
- Website: thebell1000.com

WLNL (1000 AM) is a radio station in Horseheads, New York, United States, serving the Elmira-Corning area. The station is owned by Trinity Media, Ltd. 1000 AM. Operating on a United States and Mexican clear-channel frequency, WLNL must cease broadcasting from sunset to sunrise to prevent interfering with the nighttime skywave signal of WMVP in Chicago.

This frequency was put to use from Horseheads in 1967 as WIQT, a full-service adult contemporary station owned by Manuel Panosian. Panosian successfully applied for a new license for a station at 820 kHz, and in January 1988, WIQT moved there; simultaneously, the 1000 kHz facility was sold and would air Christian programming for the next 33 years. In 2021, the station went silent for seven months and returned with its present conservative talk format under the moniker "The Bell".

== History ==
=== WIQT ===
Manuel Panosian, the owner of several clothing stores in Elmira and Horseheads, filed an application with the Federal Communications Commission (FCC) on August 10, 1965, to establish a new daytime-only radio station on 1000 kHz in Horseheads. Panosian aimed to address the programming at the Horseheads area, which he felt were underserved by the existing three stations in Chemung County. The FCC approved the construction on December 9, 1966, and the construction took place in early 1967. At one point, the call letters "WI T" were painted on the transmitter building, as the third letter in the call sign had not yet been selected; however, the call sign WIQT would be chosen.

WIQT began broadcasting on May 7, 1967. It was not long before the station expanded to FM. In December 1968, a construction permit was granted for a new FM station in Horseheads, and WQIX (100.9 FM) began broadcasting on July 4, 1970. By 1979, in addition to the radio stations, Panosian owned six shoe, clothing, and furniture stores in upstate New York, including one in Utica. In 1980, the FCC approved a power upgrade for WIQT to the present facility of 5,000 watts daytime and 2,500 watts during critical hours.

The breakdown of clear-channel radio frequencies in the 1980s created an opening for a new station—which could operate at night—at 820 kHz in the region, and Panosian's first application to move or start a new station on that frequency was filed in 1981. The FCC approved his application for 820 kHz in 1987, and work began to add towers to the transmitter site on Philo Road in Horseheads to accommodate the changeover.

=== WLNL ===
In order for Panosian to begin broadcasting at 820 kHz, it was necessary to divest the station at 1000 kHz. In late 1987, Panosian filed to sell it to Paul and Nancy Schumacher, owners of Christian radio station WSJL in Cape May, New Jersey. On January 6, 1988, WIQT and its full-service adult contemporary format signed on at 820 kHz, making way for the new Schumacher-run station at 1000 kHz. WLNL would air a mix of Christian talk and music programs. It used a mix of aging surplus equipment from WIQT and articles donated by Christian churches in its broadcast area.

WLNL's economic strength wavered in the station's early years; in 1990, its finances were described as "questionable" by its new station manager. The Schumachers sold the outlet in 1991 to Lighthouse Media, a company owned by Love Church Ministries of Horseheads, for $256,000, mostly in assumption of debt. Love Church grew throughout the 1990s, acquiring a second radio station (WMKB, an Elmira rimshot licensed to Ridgebury, Pennsylvania), and building a new church sanctuary in 1996.

Lighthouse Media was replaced by Trinity Media as licensee in 2006, although the change had in actuality occurred in 2001. Jim Pierce became the sole owner of Trinity in 2015 after Michael Cuomo sold him his 50 percent stake in the firm.

After more than 32 years of Christian programming, Trinity Media took WLNL silent on March 1, 2021; in asking for authority to remain off the air with the FCC, it cited financial difficulties. Programming resumed on October 1, 2021, After the silence, the station reemerged as "The Bell", a conservative talk station with Salem Radio Network syndicated programs from such hosts as Hugh Hewitt, Charlie Kirk, and Sebastian Gorka.
