= WJSA-FM =

- Jersey Shore, Pennsylvania; United States
- Broadcast area: Williamsport, Pennsylvania
- Frequency: 96.3 MHz

Programming
- Format: Religious
- Affiliations: SRN News

Ownership
- Owner: Montrose Broadcasting Corporation
- Sister stations: WBGM, WPEL, WPEL-FM, WPGM, WPGM-FM, WPGO

History
- Call sign meaning: "Jersey Shore, Pennsylvania"

Technical information
- Licensing authority: FCC
- Facility ID: 33085
- Class: B1
- ERP: 4,400 watts
- HAAT: 237 meters
- Transmitter coordinates: 41°13′28.00″N 77°22′48.00″W
- Translator: 100.5 W263AG (South Williamsport)

Links
- Public license information: Public file; LMS
- Webcast: Listen Live
- Website: wpgm.org

WJSA-FM (96.3 MHz) is a radio station licensed to Jersey Shore, Pennsylvania, United States. The station serves the Williamsport area. The station is currently owned by Montrose Broadcasting Company.

== Translators ==
In addition to the main station, WJSA-FM is relayed by an additional translator to widen its broadcast area.

Call sign	Frequency	City of license	FID	ERP (W)	Class	FCC info
W263AG	100.5 FM	South Williamsport, Pennsylvania	36237	1	D	LMS
W224AI	92.7 FM	Loyalsock Township, Pennsylvania	36238	20	D	LMS

== History ==
WJSA was originally an AM-only radio station authorized to operate during the daytime at 1600 kHz. Though not a Christian format, the station did air some daily devotional programs. In the fall of 1980 the station's owner, Williamsport businessman Ken Breon, sought the help of John Hogg as broadcast engineer and programming consultant, then within the year as general manager. Under Hogg's management and with Mr. Breon's agreement and involvement, the station changed format to full-time Christian programming. The AM station also extended its hours of operation and improved coverage.

=== The birth of WJSA-FM ===
39 years ago, Hogg identified an available FM frequency which would provide extended coverage and allow 24 hours a day service. Two years later the FCC granted the application and WJSA-FM began broadcasting on November 1, 1984 with a power of 3,000 watts on 93.5 MHz. A new company to operate the facilities was formed, Covenant Broadcasting Company, a partnership between Ken Breon and John Hogg.

=== Expanding the FM coverage ===
Almost immediately, Hogg identified the opportunity for several stations in the area to upgrade their signal strength by changing frequencies. This required cooperation of those stations and FCC approval took the next 12 years. In the early spring of 1997 this power upgrade was realized and WJSA-FM's frequency was changed to 96.3 MHz with a power equivalent of 25,000 watts.

Effective March 22, 2022, Covenant Broadcasting sold WJSA-FM and translator W263AG to Montrose Broadcasting Corporation for $475,000.
