= WGGO =

Coordinates: 42°10′24″N 78°41′07″W

- Salamanca, New York; United States
- Broadcast area: Western Twin Tiers
- Frequency: 1590 kHz
- Branding: The Station of the Cross

Programming
- Format: Catholic
- Affiliations: EWTN

Ownership
- Owner: Holy Family Communications

History
- First air date: June 19, 1957 (as WNYS)
- Former call signs: WNYS (1957–1958)

Technical information
- Licensing authority: FCC
- Facility ID: 9409
- Class: D
- Power: 5,000 watts day 14 watts night
- Translator: (100.5 MHz) W263CZ (Olean)

Links
- Public license information: Public file; LMS
- Webcast: Listen live
- Website: thestationofthecross.com/stations/salamanca-ny/

WGGO is an AM radio station located in Salamanca, New York, United States. The station broadcasts at 1590 kHz. WGGO is owned by Holy Family Communications as part of its network of Catholic radio stations, The Station of the Cross.

WGGO's licensed 5,000-watt daytime signal, the strongest AM signal in southwestern New York, covers all of Cattaraugus County and much of Chautauqua, Allegany, and McKean Counties as well as the Southtowns of Erie County. Further north, an FCC oversight meant that WRSB's signal interfered with WGGO's near Buffalo, a factor that was rectified when WRSB moved to AM 1600 in 2023.

== History ==
WGGO signed on June 19, 1957, with the call sign WNYS; it changed to WGGO within a year of signing on. Initial plans for the station were for it to be based in Great Valley. Religious broadcaster George Thayer built the station's transmitter; he continued to produce religious broadcasts until his death in 2020. It was initially owned by the Schaeffer family, doing business as the Cattaraugus Broadcast Service.

One of WGGO's most notable alumni is CBS weatherman Ira Joe Fisher, who worked at the station for his first job in 1963. Barry Lillis, a longtime weatherman at WGRZ and later WEBR, began his radio career at WGGO. Pete Hubbell, the son of Buffalo sportscaster Ralph Hubbell, had an early career stop at WGGO; he would later become the longtime sports director 30 miles west at Jamestown's WJTN for three decades.

In the late 1970s/early 1980s, WGGO's original programming included "Tradio on the Radio" and a top 25 countdown show called "The Most Alive 25". During this time period, one of the evening DJs went by the moniker "Johnny B. Goode", and would end each broadcast day by playing the Chuck Berry hit before sign-off.

WGGO was a local operation well into the 1990s, when it ran a country music and variety format. Some time in the late 1990s, WGGO switched to a satellite nostalgia format ("America's Best Music") from Westwood One. In 2003, the station moved to an MOR format ("Unforgettable Favorites") from ABC Radio, with ABC News Radio updates at the top of each hour.

Prior to 2003 the station was a daytime-only station that, regardless of time of year, would always sign off at 5:00 PM each day. The station now broadcasts at a nominal power level at night.

=== End of local programming ===
In 2006, Pembrook Pines Media Group (an ownership group led by Robert Pfuntner) purchased the station's license and assets from previous owner Michael Washington. Pembrook Pines changed the format to sports radio along with sister stations WELM in Elmira and WPIE in Ithaca. The last regularly scheduled local non-brokered program on the station, Tradio, was dropped unceremoniously in 2008. On Sunday September 12, 2010 at 9:22am, the longest running program on WGGO AM, "The Voice Of Living Waters", ended its run; Bill Ferguson, Sr. (1924–2012) started the program in 1963. The program was first called "The Voice of Many Waters" and had as its theme song the song of the same title. The ESPN Radio affiliation moved to WHDL in October 2013, at which point WGGO assumed an adult standards/oldies format.

Sound Communications was slated to buy what is left of Pembrook Pines in 2014, and changed the format to adult standards in late 2013 (at the time simulcasting WEHH in Elmira) upon the assumption of a local marketing agreement, but withdrew its bid days before it was to close because of cross-ownership objections. Once those objections were resolved (WEHH was not included in the revised sale, so that simulcast had to be broken), Sound acquired WGGO.

According to property records on file at Cattaraugus County, Sound Communications only purchased WGGO's license; previous owner Michael Washington reacquired the transmitter site, former studio and tower in the Pembrook Pines bankruptcy in 2015. Sound eventually ceased usage of Washington's studio when the Main Studio Rule expired in the late 2010s but bought the studio in 2019 so that it owned the transmitter site, which is on the same property.

WGGO flipped to an all-syndicated talk format in early 2016 with content from Salem Radio Network's "The Answer." All of the sports programming on the station (at the time this consisted of Buffalo Bisons baseball and a package of Allegany-Limestone Central School athletics) continued unaffected.

=== Tower collapse and periods of silence ===
The station was knocked off the air when its tower collapsed as the result of a windstorm in March 2017. At the time, Washington and Sound were in discussion with the insurance company about rebuilding the tower. On March 7, 2018, one day before its license was to be automatically forfeited to the FCC, WGGO returned to the air, airing an automated loop of early-to-mid-1970s soft rock. Two weeks later, the station began simulcasting WQRS. In January 2019, the station went silent again and WGGO's call sign was dropped from WQRS's station identification; WGGO returned to the air March 2 of that year, this time airing conservative talk from Premiere Networks and remaining affiliated with Salem. Despite the relative lack of promotion, WGGO registered a measurable audience in the Nielsens for the first time in several years with its return. As part of the return, an FM translator was established for the station on 100.5 FM in Olean.

In late 2019, Sound, by then operating as a partially owned collaboration with Waypoint Media, struck an agreement to turn all of its broadcast assets, including the WGGO license, to Standard Media. In January 2021, Waypoint withdrew from the sale agreement. One month afterward, when Seven Mountains Media announced it would acquire Waypoint's New York assets, WGGO was included among the licenses that would be donated to Family Life Network, along with AM 820 in Elmira; as Family Life does not operate AM stations, has historically declined to purchase such stations (it declined to purchase WBVG or WFBL when involved in a similar swap in 2015), and has so far not applied to change the station's call sign, the fate of WGGO after the swap is unknown, with industry speculation that WGGO and its Elmira counterpart may go silent again. The FM translator will go to Seven Mountains Media and will no longer simulcast WGGO. The sale closed June 1, 2021, upon which WGGO flipped to Family Life programming. Family Life did not include WGGO as one of its affiliates (it did not, for example, change call signs to a WCG, WCI or WCO as with its other stations), and eventual plans were for Family Life to sell WGGO and AM 820 WPGO (the latter of which was spun off to another religious broadcaster in August) to another broadcaster in the future.

In September 2021, Family Life sold WGGO and translator W263CZ to Holy Family Communications, which flipped the station to its Roman Catholic format under the brand The Station of the Cross. The sale was consummated on November 22, 2021, at a price of $100,000. Holy Family Communications placed the WGGO studio up for sale in 2023, with the stipulation that it remain in control of the transmitter and studio.
