= WCBA (AM) =

Coordinates: 42°06′59″N 77°02′24″W

- United States
- Broadcast area: Corning, New York
- Frequency: 1350 kHz

Programming
- Format: Defunct (was Sports)

Ownership
- Owner: William Christian; (Great Radio, LLC)
- Sister stations: WYDC, WJKP-LD

History
- First air date: 1948
- Last air date: 2022
- Call sign meaning: W Corning Broadcasting A

Technical information
- Facility ID: 19652
- Class: D
- Power: 1,000 watts day 37 watts night
- Translator: 99.9 W260DE (Corning)

WCBA (1350 AM) was a radio station in the Elmira-Corning market of New York state. It broadcast with 1,000 watts day and 37 watts night on 1350 kHz from studios in South Corning, New York.

== History ==
The station signed on as Corning's second AM station prior to 1967, according to the obituary for John T. Horn, the longtime disc jockey known on the air as Jack Shane.

Dean Slack bought the station in 1977 and persuaded Horn, who started his career at WCBA 10 years earlier and was then a top personality at WENY, to return. "Dean and Jack" hosted the morning show on the adult contemporary station for 12 years.

In 1988, Slack signed WCBA-FM on the air, giving WCBA an FM presence in the market. The stations were simulcast early on and often were referred to in marketing as "The WCBA stations".

Slack sold the stations in 1990 to Eolin Broadcasting Inc., which was headed by former Gateway Communications television station manager Bob Eolin, his wife Dee, and Horn. Bob Eolin replaced Slack as morning-show co-host.

By the early 1990s, WCBA had established an Adult standards format, while the FM remained adult contemporary. The adult contemporary morning show aired on both stations.

WCBA "1350 Gold" logo

In 1997, WCBA acquired its longtime rival and Horn's former employer (after his first WCBA tenure) WCLI when Eolin Broadcasting bought the station from Sabre Communications. A year prior to that, Eolin Broadcasting had bought WGMM.

In 2001, Eolin Broadcasting bought WENY and WENY-FM from White Broadcasting. At that point, Horn had become a part owner of all of the stations for which he worked in the market. He died unexpectedly in July 2002 at his summer home on Seneca Lake.

"Bob and Dee" hosted the morning show until they sold their stations a little more than a year later to Route 81 Radio, based in Hazleton, Pennsylvania.

Following the collapse of Route 81 Radio, the station was sold to WS Media, LLC, a company controlled by William Christian of Vision Communications. After WHHO ceased operations in 2009, the station dropped its standards format in favor of the Fox Sports Radio Network. WS Media is in the process of swapping WCBA in exchange for WKPQ; WCBA will be transferred to Phoenix Radio, Inc. in the transfer.

Effective March 15, 2013, Great Radio, LLC (another company controlled by Christian along with his son Jeffrey) acquired WCBA for $6,000. Christian took the station silent on June 21, 2019. The station returned to the air December 20.

WCBA was not included in the stations spun off to either Seven Mountains Media nor Family Life Network in 2021. WCBA again went silent on August 9 of that year. After one year of silence, WCBA's license was formally cancelled on August 11, 2022. W260DE’s license was also cancelled that same day.

== Alumni ==
- Vinnie Ferrari
- Edd Hall
- Dick Biondi
