= WBGM =

Coordinates: 40.891°N 76.998°W

- New Berlin, Pennsylvania; United States
- Broadcast area: Sunbury-Selinsgrove-Lewisburg, PA
- Frequency: 88.1 MHz

Programming
- Format: Religious
- Affiliations: SRN News

Ownership
- Owner: Montrose Broadcasting Corp.
- Sister stations: WJSA-FM, WPEL, WPEL-FM, WPGM, WPGM-FM

Technical information
- Licensing authority: FCC
- Facility ID: 43663
- Class: A
- ERP: 550 watts
- HAAT: 127 meters (417 ft)

Links
- Public license information: Public file; LMS
- Webcast: Listen Live
- Website: wpgm.org

WBGM (88.1 FM) is a radio station licensed to New Berlin, Pennsylvania. It is a sister station to WPGM (AM) and WPGM-FM, also located in New Berlin.
