= WMTT-FM =

Radio station in Tioga, Pennsylvania

- Tioga, Pennsylvania; United States
- Broadcast area: New York's Southern Tier - Elmira - Corning
- Frequency: 94.7 MHz
- Branding: The Met Rocks

Programming
- Format: Classic rock
- Affiliations: Compass Media Networks

Ownership
- Owner: Seven Mountains Media; (Southern Belle, LLC)
- Sister stations: WCBF, WNKI, WNGZ, WPHD, WZHD

History
- First air date: 1991 (as WPHD at 93.3)
- Former call signs: WKGV (June–December 1989); WPHD (December 1989–2003); WMTT (2003–2020); WQBF (2020–2021)
- Former frequencies: 93.3 MHz (1991)
- Call sign meaning: "Met"

Technical information
- Licensing authority: FCC
- Facility ID: 19858
- Class: B1
- ERP: 12,000 watts
- HAAT: 147 meters (482 ft)
- Transmitter coordinates: 42.062°N 77.360°W
- Translator: See § FM translator
- Repeater: 92.7 WENI-FM (South Waverly)

Links
- Public license information: Public file; LMS
- Webcast: Listen live
- Website: themetrocks.com

WMTT-FM (94.7 MHz) is a commercial radio station licensed to Tioga, Pennsylvania, United States, and serving New York's Southern Tier, including the Elmira–Corning radio market. WMTT-FM is owned by Seven Mountains Media, with the license held by Southern Belle, LLC. It broadcasts a classic rock radio format, simulcast with co-owned WENI-FM (92.7) in South Waverly. The radio studios and offices are on Chemung Street in Horseheads, New York.

== History ==
When the station signed on Memorial Day Weekend of 1991 as WPHD, the station was on 93.3 MHz and was rebroadcasting its sister station at the time, WKGB-FM, Conklin, New York.

In September 1991, WPHD switched to 94.7 MHz. In April 1992, the station began a progressive separation from its sister, WKGB-FM. During 1994, WPHD ran the ABC Classic Rock format. From January 1, 1995 to May 1, 1995, WPHD simulcast FM station WZMT, Hazleton, Pennsylvania, which at the time was called The Mountain, airing a mainstream rock format leaning towards classic rock.

From May 1, 1995 until early 1996, WPHD simulcast WCDW, Susquehanna, Pennsylvania, which at the time aired a classic hits format leaning heavily on rock songs from the 1970s and 1980s. From early 1996 to July 3, 2020, WPHD aired its own classic rock format; in 2003, it changed its call sign to WMTT to reflect its "Met" branding.

On June 25, 2020, WMTT changed its call sign to WQBF, and then on July 3, 2020 flipped to country as part of a five-station format swap, where 94.7's former classic rock format and WMTT call sign moved to 820/101.3 and 100.9, while 100.9's former country format moved to 94.7, WCBF (96.1 FM), and WOBF (97.1 FM) as "Bigfoot Country".

In July 2021, WQBF changed its call sign to WMTT-FM and returned to the "Met" classic rock format, as part of a simulcast with WENI-FM (92.7) in South Waverly.

== FM translator ==
WMTT-FM also broadcasts on the following translators:

Broadcast translators for WMTT-FM
Call sign	Frequency	City of license	FID	ERP (W)	Class	FCC info
W226AP	93.1 FM	Hornell, New York	140300	250	D	LMS
W239BK	95.7 FM	Bath, New York	154350	50	D	LMS
W250BI	97.9 FM	Mansfield, Pennsylvania	156729	68	D	LMS
W284BX	104.7 FM	Alfred, New York	153045	5.4	D	LMS
