= WPGM-FM =

Coordinates: 40.988°N 76.547°W

- Danville, Pennsylvania; United States
- Broadcast area: Sunbury-Selinsgrove-Lewisburg, PA
- Frequency: 96.7 MHz

Programming
- Format: Religious
- Affiliations: SRN News

Ownership
- Owner: Montrose Broadcasting Corp.
- Sister stations: WBGM, WJSA-FM, WPEL, WPEL-FM, WPGM, WPGO

Technical information
- Licensing authority: FCC
- Facility ID: 43650
- Class: A
- ERP: 570 watts
- HAAT: 233 meters (764 ft)

Links
- Public license information: Public file; LMS
- Webcast: Listen Live
- Website: wpgmfm.org

WPGM-FM (96.7 MHz) is a religious formatted radio station licensed to serve Danville, Pennsylvania. The station is owned by Montrose Broadcasting Corp.
