= Dick Biondi =

American disc jockey (1932–2023)

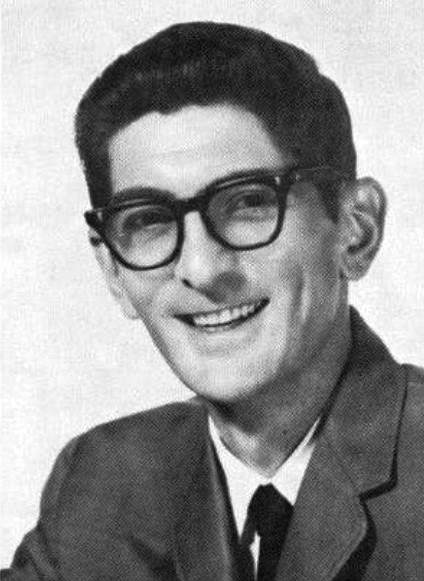
- Biondi at WCFL, circa 1967
- Born: Richard Orlando Biondi; September 13, 1932; Endicott, New York, U.S.
- Died: June 26, 2023 (aged 90); Chicago, Illinois, U.S.
- Presenting career
- Stations: WINR; WCBA-AM; KVOB; KSYL; WHOT AM; WKBW AM; WEBR; WLS AM; KRLA; WCFL AM; WMAQ AM; WBZ; WSAI; WNMB; WBBM FM; WJMK FM; WLS FM

Richard Orlando Biondi (September 13, 1932 – June 26, 2023) was an American Top 40 and oldies disc jockey. Calling himself The Wild I-tralian, he was one of the original "screamers", known for his screaming delivery as well as wild antics on and off the air. In a 1988 interview, Biondi said he had been fired 23 times, with both fits of temper and jokes gone wrong part of the tally. Over many years and many frequencies, Dick's closing line was, "God bless, bye, bye, Duke. Thanks a million for dialing our way."

Biondi gained national attention in the 1950s and 1960s as a disc jockey on leading AM radio stations in Buffalo, New York; Chicago, Illinois; and Los Angeles, California. Besides being among the first to play Elvis Presley, Jerry Lee Lewis, Gene Vincent, and other early rhythm and blues artists, he was also able to meet them. During the early Rock and Roll era, "record hops" at local schools and clubs typically featured appearances by disc jockeys; often, they also included appearances by the artists whose records were being played.

Biondi is credited as the first U.S. disc jockey to play the Beatles, on Chicago's WLS 890 AM in February 1963, with the song "Please Please Me". Later, while working at KRLA (1110 AM) in Los Angeles, he introduced the Beatles and the Rolling Stones at their Hollywood Bowl concerts.

From 1984, Biondi had been a mainstay on oldies stations in the city where he first earned his reputation, Chicago. On May 2, 2010, Dick Biondi celebrated the 50th anniversary of his first Chicago broadcast. WLS-AM and WLS-FM presented a five-hour (7:00 p.m.-midnight) simulcast special featuring memorable moments in his career and special celebrity guests, with Biondi as host.

Biondi was an inductee of the Radio Hall of Fame (Chicago).

== Documentary ==
The documentary, The Voice That Rocked America - The Dick Biondi Story was released on streaming platforms and DVD in 2023.

== Career ==
=== 1940s–1950s ===
Biondi was born and raised in Endicott, New York. His lifelong love of radio began at an early age, when he was allowed to read a commercial on WMBO in Auburn, New York. His father Mike, an Endicott fireman, and mother Rose, encouraged him in his goal; at the time it was to become a sportscaster. He went on to work behind the scenes and learned about broadcasting at nearby WINR, Binghamton, New York, where one of his co-workers was a young Rod Serling.

Another co-worker, himself a sportscaster, took an interest in the young Biondi and began working with him on pronunciation and diction. As a sportscaster, Biondi began his on-air career in radio on WCBA 1350 AM in Corning, New York. He continued on to KVOB, Bastrop, Louisiana, but it wasn't until working for KSYL in Alexandria that Biondi started doing music shows. It was here where he became acquainted with rhythm and blues. Career moves took him to York, Pennsylvania, and WHOT-AM, Youngstown, Ohio. When Biondi arrived there, Rock and Roll was on the airwaves, and he began doing local appearances with such stars as Fabian, Paul Anka, and Bobby Darin.

At a 1956 Cleveland Elvis Presley concert, Biondi had Elvis sign the shirt he was wearing. When Biondi returned to the crowd, Presley's frenzied female fans started tearing away at it. Biondi was hospitalized, to the amusement of Elvis.

Biondi was hired in 1958 by WKBW (1520 AM) in Buffalo; at WKBW if conditions were right, Biondi could be heard in Europe. After a dispute at WKBW, Biondi jokingly described his boss's car on the air, said where he would be driving, and asked his listeners to throw rocks at it. Someone did as Biondi asked, and he was fired the next day. He worked at the original WEBR (at the frequency now known as WDCZ) in Buffalo, from which he was also fired in spring 1960. Two weeks later, he was hired at WLS, which covered most of the United States east of the Continental Divide and drove his breakthrough to fame.

=== 1960s–1970s ===
To promote the WLS "Bright New Sound" which premiered May 2, 1960, ABC executives did some advance publicity by bringing two of its new personalities to Chicago early. Biondi and colleague Bob Hale made the media and music rounds. After their first big day as the representatives of the new WLS, they returned to the station that evening to begin asking for and taking collect calls from any point in the U.S. Calls came in from across the country as well as from a couple of ships at sea. Biondi recalled the first record he played on the new WLS was Elvis's "Teddy Bear." Many record company executives considered him a vital part of the hitmaking process. Biondi's playing a record on his show gave it maximum exposure to a very large audience; he was the most popular night time DJ in the Midwest. There was a lot of fun at WLS; in response to the record, "There Was Fungus Among Us", Dick issued his listeners "Fungus Licenses".

In 1961 he made a record, "On Top of a Pizza" (a parody of "On Top of Old Smoky"), that became a local hit. The flip side of the record is "Knock-Knock", a nod to the jokes Dick told on the air so often. (e.g., "Knock knock." "Who's there?" "Biondi." "Biondi who?" "Biondi Blue Horizon.") In 1963, Biondi left WLS over a dispute involving the number of commercials on his radio show. Rumors and urban legends still persist that Biondi told an obscene joke on the air which resulted in his being fired. Part of Biondi's hiatus from radio was spent making a record album, Dick Biondi's Favorites - the Teenagers with Ray Stevens. He moved to KRLA, then the No. 1 Top 40 station in the Los Angeles market. At KRLA, Biondi was in good company working with other legendary radio personalities, including Bob Eubanks, Casey Kasem, Emperor Bob Hudson and Dave Hull. Not long after arriving there, Dick created The Dick Biondi Road Show which brought new acts to perform at high schools all over Southern California.

From 1964 to 1965, between KRLA stints, he hosted a nationally syndicated show, Dick Biondi's Young America, carried by 125 stations on the Mutual Broadcasting System. Through this program, Dick was heard on WCFL 3 years prior to his signing with the station. During his time with the Mutual show, Biondi obtained exclusivity rights for records for all of his subscriber stations; this was a big boost to their ability to be competitive in smaller radio markets. He returned to KRLA in early 1965, soon after the Mutual show was cancelled.

Biondi returned to Chicago on WCFL (1000 AM) in 1967. In addition to his regular airshift, Dick did many specialty shows for WCFL: Pop Goes the Music and In the Beginning looked back at early Rock and Roll; This Is Elvis explored Elvis's life, and Dick Biondi Labels the Blues delved into that genre and its influence on Rock and Roll. Dick Biondi and Friend was an interview program featuring then-current popular music stars. There was also the weekly "Vietnam Show" that allowed listeners to send greetings to family and friends serving overseas; copies went to Armed Forces Radio Network.

In 1972, after a short time at WMAQ (AM), he left Chicago once again, working at WBZ Boston, WSAI Cincinnati, and a decade-long stint on WNMB in North Myrtle Beach, South Carolina. Beginning in 1976, during his time at WNMB, Dick produced a syndicated program called Dick Biondi's Super Gold Rock and Roll which was syndicated to about 60 radio stations. WNMB began rebroadcasting the shows on February 3, 2010.

=== 1980s–2017 ===
In the early 1980s, former WLS DJ Bob Sirott was a reporter for WBBM-TV. He did an ongoing feature, Where Are They Now? which located and interviewed former famous Chicagoans who had slipped from local prominence. Dick was the subject of Sirott's show in 1982; it was enough to rekindle local radio professional interest in him and Biondi returned to Chicago the next year - briefly working at WBBM (96.3 FM). In 1984, he was the signature voice for the launch of the new Oldies station WJMK (104.3 FM), where he was heard until the station switched formats in June 2005. Biondi, along with the Oldies format, was kept on digital subcarrier HD2, but was released in July 2006 along with all other on-air personalities. In November 2006, Biondi started on WLS (94.7 FM), where he hosted from 11 p.m. to 2 a.m. Central Time (formerly 7 - 11 p.m.). In November 2015, his show was moved to weekend mornings. Columbia College Chicago presented Inside the Radio Studio with Dick Biondi & Herb Kent - 100 Years on the Air on April 10, 2010. Both were on the air until Kent died on October 22, 2016.

In May 2017, Biondi released a statement declaring his intention to return after reportedly recovering from a leg ailment for which he was hospitalized. This never materialized and in May 2018, WLS-FM confirmed Biondi was no longer employed by the station.

== Awards and recognition ==
In 1961, while at WLS, Biondi received the Gavin Top 40 Disc Jockey of the Year Award. In 1966, when he was at KRLA, he was Billboard's most popular late evening DJ. In 1995, Biondi was honored in an exhibit at the Rock and Roll Hall of Fame along with other legendary disc jockeys. He was inducted into the Radio Hall of Fame in 1998, with the message, "He's an okay guy." In 2011, Biondi was inducted into the Southern Tier Broadcasters Hall of Fame and the Buffalo Broadcasting Hall of Fame.

Illinois Governor Pat Quinn proclaimed May 1, 2010 "Dick Biondi Day" in Illinois. The Chicago City Council also honored Biondi's longevity in Chicago radio by naming a street in his honor, "Dick Biondi Way". His ambition was to become the oldest active Rock and Roll disc jockey in the US. Biondi has said "I'd like to die with my earphones on."

== Death ==
Biondi died in Chicago June 26, 2023, at the age of 90. He was survived by his wife Maribeth.

== See also ==
- Internet Archive: Dick Biondi Show, WLS-AM Anniversaries, May 2, 1962 and May 2, 1963
