= Rod Denson =

Rod Denson was a former radio and television personality in the Elmira-Corning television market from 1959 to 1989.

== The Radio Years ==
Known as "Rockin' Rod", Rod was a disk jockey for radio station WEHH from 1959 to 1963.

Rod Denson got his start in radio while a student at Thomas A. Edison High School in Elmira Heights. Station owner Frank Saia donated a half-hour of air time Saturday morning to both local High Schools. Known as "The Heights High School Show" and "The Horseheads High School Show". During each school's respective half-hour, a student from that school would play music from the Fabulous Fifty Chart, read announcements about upcoming school events, report sports scores etc. One Saturday morning Denson substituted for the school's regular host and his work so impressed owner Frank Saia, that he hired him part-time immediately after the show. Denson began working after that for one hour a week, the last hour before Sunday evening sign off. Denson eventually worked up to 20 hours a week part-time from October 1959 to 1961.

He was then hired full-time for two years, and could be heard mornings from 6 to 10 on the morning show called "The Town Crier". He was back on the air from noon until 2 PM with the "Rod Denson Show". His last day on the job was in early November 1963. In August 1962 Denson interviewed Les Paul and Mary Ford at the original Latta Brook Studios. Originally the live interview was expected to run 10 minutes but lasted for more than one hour. Rod remembers Les and Mary picking on his wife Midge who was 4 months away from giving birth to Rod Jr.

Rod left his tape recorder in the trunk of his car at Les and Mary's Motel while he and his wife Midge rode to the studio with them. Because of that Denson does not have a recording the interview, something he regrets to this day.

Denson interviewed Chubby Checker at his Motel in Elmira when both were 21 years old, this time he had his recorder and still has the tape of the interview. When singer Conway Twitty was in Elmira to perform, Station owner Frank Saia came up with the idea of giving away pieces of Twitty's tee shirt as a promotion. Twitty supplied a tee shirt and dozens of pieces were given away and some probably survive to this day in area scrapbooks

== The TV Years ==
Mr. Denson began his television broadcasting career on November 11, 1963 when he was hired as WSYE/Elmira's first full-time chief photographer by General Manager Art Kendall. Local news events of that era were filmed with 16mm cameras using negative film and Polaroid cameras with black-and-white prints. When the 16mm negative film was run through the projector in the control room the image was electronically reversed so it ended up a positive image on viewers home screens. To show the Polaroid prints they were taped to a board side by side, the board was then inserted into a slot on a wooden frame where the prints were moved horizontally. A studio camera was focused on a rectangular slot in the frame where the prints appeared one by one. As the anchor read news script the photos were moved in relation to the story.

In the late 70s Denson was one of the first cameramen in New York State and the nation to use portable color video tape recorders to shoot news events. Denson anchored the Saturday 11PM Newscast alone, doing the local, state, sports, national news and weather from Hawley Hill. There were times when the Saturday newscast was done with only two people in the building, an engineer in the control room and Denson in the Studio. Most of the time there were four people for that newscast, a director, engineer, studio cameraman and Denson.

Denson left WSYE in 1989, then known as WETM, after serving as an engineer for the station from 1987 to 1989. He later would join Elmira College's staff, managing the college's audio-visual department.

A video compilation of Rod's career can be found on YouTube.
