= WPEL-FM =

- Montrose, Pennsylvania; United States
- Broadcast area: Wilkes-Barre–Scranton, Pennsylvania; Binghamton, New York
- Frequency: 96.5 MHz

Programming
- Format: Christian radio
- Network: SRN News

Ownership
- Owner: Montrose Broadcasting Corp.
- Sister stations: WBGM, WJSA-FM, WPEL, WPGM, WPGM-FM

History
- First air date: June 5, 1961
- Call sign meaning: We Proclaim Everlasting Life

Technical information
- Licensing authority: FCC
- Facility ID: 65965
- Class: B
- ERP: 57,000 watts
- HAAT: 140 meters (460 ft)
- Transmitter coordinates: 41°51′16.30″N 75°51′48.70″W
- Translator: See § Translators

Links
- Public license information: Public file; LMS
- Webcast: Listen live
- Website: wpel.org

WPEL-FM (96.5 FM) is a non-commercial radio station licensed to Montrose, Pennsylvania, United States, serving the Binghamton and Wilkes-Barre–Scranton markets. It is owned by Montrose Broadcasting and airs a Christian format, with much of the programming simulcast on WPGO in Horseheads. The studios are on High Street in Montrose.

WPEL-FM's transmitter is off Pennsylvania Route 29 near Chalker Road in Montrose.

== History ==
WPEL, a 1,000 watt daytimer station, has been on the air since May 30, 1953, and has always aired Christian radio programs. It was founded by W. Douglas Roe. Eight years later, Roe received a construction permit to build a sister station.

WPEL-FM signed on the air on June 5, 1961. At 57,000 watts, it is one of the region's most powerful radio stations. Located about halfway between Scranton, Pennsylvania and Binghamton, New York, WPEL-FM serves a potential audience of more than 800,000 listeners in 16 counties of Northeastern Pennsylvania and New York's Southern Tier. It broadcasts a mix of Bible teaching programs, music and newscasts. The playlist consists of traditional hymns, instrumentals, worship music and classic adult contemporary Christian music, along with classical music mixed in during the station's afternoon drive.

Former logo

WPEL-FM began streaming its programming on line on April 17, 2008.

The Montrose Broadcasting Corporation also owns and operates radio stations WPGO in Horseheads, New York, WPGM-AM-FM in Danville, Pennsylvania, and WBGM-FM in New Berlin, Pennsylvania.

== Translators ==
In addition to the main transmitter, WPEL-FM is relayed on four FM translators to widen its broadcast area.

Call sign	Frequency	City of license	FID	ERP (W)	Class	FCC info
W219CE	91.7 FM	Elmira, New York	89939	55	D	LMS
W221AS	92.1 FM	Sayre, Pennsylvania	5200	8	D	LMS
W234BT	94.7 FM	Endicott, New York	43660	250	D	LMS
W292DL	106.3 FM	Binghamton, New York	43661	14	D	LMS
