= WPEL (AM) =

- Montrose, Pennsylvania; United States
- Broadcast area: Scranton - Binghamton
- Frequency: 800 kHz

Programming
- Format: Southern gospel
- Affiliations: SRN News

Ownership
- Owner: Montrose Broadcasting Corporation
- Sister stations: WBGM, WJSA-FM, WPEL-FM, WPGM, WPGM-FM, WPGO

History
- First air date: May 30, 1953

Technical information
- Licensing authority: FCC
- Facility ID: 43658
- Class: D
- Power: 1,000 watts (day); 135 watts (night)
- Transmitter coordinates: 41°51′16″N 75°51′50″W
- Translator: 95.5 W238CM (Endicott, New York)

Links
- Public license information: Public file; LMS
- Webcast: Listen live
- Website: www.wpel.org

WPEL (800 AM) is a non-commercial radio station licensed to Montrose, Pennsylvania, United States. It is owned by Montrose Broadcasting and airs a Christian radio format, mixing Southern Gospel music with talk and teaching programs. The studios are on High Street in Montrose.

Programming is also heard on FM translator W238CM at 95.5 MHz in Endicott, New York.

== History ==
=== Founding ===
WPEL signed on the air on May 30, 1953. Its original frequency was 1250 kilocycles and it was founded by W. Douglas Roe. WPEL has always been a Christian station. The funding came in part from the Montrose Bible Conference, of which Roe was the executive director.

In 1961, Montrose Broadcasting added a sister station, WPEL-FM 96.5. Roe was the original licensee of both stations and died in 1984.

=== Frequency change ===
On October 17, 2007, WPEL changed frequencies from 1250 kHz, on which it had been transmitting for 54 years, to 800 kHz. The switch was made to give the station a larger coverage area. Around 2000, the Federal Communications Commission relaxed rules that restricted many AM stations from broadcasting on clear-channel frequencies such as 800 AM. That gave Montrose Broadcasting the opportunity to relocate WPEL. Generally stations lower on the AM dial are able to cover more territory than stations higher up the band with similar power.

In 2015, WPEL 800 began rebroadcasting its programming on an FM translator at 95.5 in Endicott, New York.

=== Ownership ===
In addition to WPEL-AM-FM and WPGO, the Montrose Broadcasting Corporation also owns and operates radio stations WPGM and WPGM-FM in Danville, Pennsylvania, and WBGM-FM in New Berlin, Pennsylvania.

Larry Souder served as president of the Montrose Broadcasting Corporation from 1984 to 2017, and WPGM since 1964. As of April 1, 2017, James Baker, the manager of WPEL, assumed the roles of President and CEO.
