= Vinnie Ferrari =

American professional wrestler (born 1971)

Personal information
- Born: Kevin Olmstead; July 23, 1971 (age 55) Elmira, New York, U.S.

Professional wrestling career
- Ring name(s): Vinnie Ferrari; Backyard Superstar; Kevin Olmstead
- Billed height: 6 ft 1 in (185 cm)
- Billed weight: 250 lb (113 kg)
- Billed from: Daytona Beach, Florida; Montreal, Quebec; Washington, D.C.
- Trained by: "Ironheart" Todd Costner; H. C. Loc; Big Poppa Chill; Hellcat
- Debut: 1999

Kevin Olmstead is an independent professional wrestling referee and former manager/wrestler known as Vinnie Ferrari. He also was a candidate for president of the United States. A former radio personality in the Elmira-Corning, New York, market, he became a ring announcer for the United States Wrestling Federation after his station booked the USWF for a 1996 radio promotion.

He discovered during the promotion that friends H. C. Loc and Big Poppa Chill were training to be wrestlers. He also had conversations during that time with Tony Atlas, Nikolai Volkoff, Bill Eadie, and Bam Bam Bigelow, after which he decided to go into training.

The USWF training facility had multiple trainers and locations while Ferrari was in training. He picked up instruction wherever he could, often before USWF events from Loc, Chill and any other workers who were willing to offer instruction.

As a ring announcer, or occasionally as a manager, Ferrari often was caught up in the action when it spilled out of the ring, but the USWF never hired him expressly as a wrestler.

He was booked for the first time as a wrestler in 1999, when he lost to Big Poppa Chill in Cheektowaga, New York.

In late 1999/early 2001 Vinnie helped future independent wrestling star "Poison" Appollo Starr to get training. Appollo would go on to get further training from Jimmy KillKillia and American Kickboxer at the R.A.A.G.E. Dojo. He still credits Vinnie for teaching him to work left, how to bump and some of the finer points of pro wrestling as well helping him get booked for his first match with Don Adams' Penn York Wrestling.

== New Millennium Wrestling ==
Ferrari began appearing on cards for New Millennium Wrestling, a promotion based out of Rochester, New York first as a ring announcer and eventually as a wrestler and manager. While he never wrestled a match on the bigger live show, he appeared as a masked backyard wrestler named I.B. Green. After returning to managing, Olmstead would pass the masked gimmick down to trainee Rob Cook who still uses the moniker on the independent circuit. As manager Vinnie Ferrari, Olmstead would guide the team of Chills 'N Thrills (Big Poppa Chill and The Canadian Thriller) to several NMW Tag Team Championship matches. He later wrestled for several independent promotions in the Eastern United States—primarily Upstate New York and Pennsylvania before "retiring" in 2001.

== Retirement ==
Even in "retirement," Ferrari worked occasionally as a ring announcer. On December 6, 2004, after the hoopla of the 2004 presidential campaign had subsided, Ferrari announced his intention to run for President of the United States in 2008. His candidacy has been the subject of occasional news reports worldwide.

Four days after announcing for president, Ferrari returned to the ring, managing former WWF wrestler Don Adams in the Tamaqua, Pennsylvania-based Elite Generation Wrestling. Within a month, he managed Big Poppa Chill to the EGW Heavyweight Championship. Chill lost the title to Slambo the Clown a couple of months later.

On June 10, 2005, Ferrari nearly defeated Slambo to win the title himself in his first match since 2001. In October 2005, Ferrari managed Rockin' Rebel to the title, though Rebel quickly lost it to "Dynamic" Dennis Diamond. Since then, he has managed the Redneck Mafia and Team Darkness to EGW tag-team titles. In 2006, Ferrari worked mainly for EGW as the manager of the Ferrari Administration and occasional wrestler.

As of December 2007, his former Web site, vinnie4prez.com is no longer active. He has recently worked as a referee for promotions in Pennsylvania, West Virginia and Indiana.

== Ferrari Administration members ==
- I.B. Green
- "The Virginia Beach Brawler" Braydon Shokker
- Big Poppa Chill
- Jebediah Gambino

Past members

- "The Extreme Redneck" Don Adams
- Rikki Lane
- Joey Image
- Matt Skillz
- Joey Hex
- Rockin' Rebel
- K'Ras Van Tasel
- Porter
