= WENI (AM) =

Radio station in Corning, New York

Coordinates: 42°6′59.27″N 77°2′22.88″W

- Corning, New York; United States
- Frequency: 1450 kHz
- Branding: Bigfoot Legends 102.9–103.3

Programming
- Format: Classic country

Ownership
- Owner: Seven Mountains Media; (Southern Belle, LLC)
- Sister stations: WMAJ, WENI-FM, WPHD

History
- First air date: November 1949 (as WCLI)
- Former call signs: WCLI (1949–2004)
- Call sign meaning: similar to WENY

Technical information
- Licensing authority: FCC
- Facility ID: 53610
- Class: C
- Power: 1,000 watts day; 930 watts night
- Translators: 102.9 W275DD (Elmira); 103.3 W277DG (Corning)

Links
- Public license information: Public file; LMS
- Webcast: Listen live
- Website: bigfootlegendsny.com

WENI (1450 AM) is a radio station licensed to Corning, New York, and serving the Elmira-Corning radio market. It is owned by Seven Mountains Media and airs a classic country format, branded as "Bigfoot Legends". It broadcasts with 1,000 watts day and night on 1450 kHz from studios in South Corning, New York.

== History ==
The station was founded as WCLI by the Corning Leader newspaper in November 1949 as the first AM station licensed to Corning and the fourth station in the market. It joined FM station WKNP, which had signed on in 1947 and was Corning's first station. Both were owned by the Leader and broadcast from its building, then located at Erie Avenue (now Dennison Parkway) and Walnut Street in Corning. Long time radio engineer, Mark Saia, reports that his father, Frank Saia, and Bob Shaddock were the first two broadcasters hired. Both on the same day.

The Erie Railroad mainline passed nearby and passing freight and passenger trains used to shake the building—and the recorded music on the turntables, according to Leader columnist Dick Peer.

Disc jockey Bob Shaddock, who became one of the market's iconic radio personalities, developed the skill of picking up the needle from the 78 RPM records and making announcements while trains passed, according to Peer.

The Leader sold the stations in 1953. Though the FM station changed call letters a few times (and frequency once), the stations remained linked until 1997, when owner Sabre Communications sold WCLI to Eolin Broadcasting Inc.

While the FM station had a 50,000-watt signal that could be heard throughout the market, WCLI was a Class C local station broadcasting with 1,000 watts on a so-called graveyard frequency. In addition, the ground conductivity was poor at its Denmark Hill tower site, so the AM station could barely be heard at night outside Corning.

In the 1980s, WCLI was a soft adult contemporary station. In 1990, it switched to talk radio, anchored by The Rush Limbaugh Show. WCLI was among the first stations to sign on as an affiliate of the show.

WCLI remained a talk station after the sale to Eolin. However, the terms of the sale called for the rights to broadcast Limbaugh and other popular shows to remain with Sabre. WCLI programming then included Dr. Joy Browne and Bob Grant, along with other shows on the WOR Radio Network.

After Eolin assumed management of WENY in Elmira through a local marketing agreement with White Broadcasting, WCLI programming was simulcast on WENY. The latter station, like WCLI, is a class C station. Together, the two stations effectively cover the market.

In 2003, Eolin Broadcasting sold all of the stations to Route 81 Radio, based in Hazleton, Pennsylvania. Route 81 switched WCLI's call letters to WENI in 2004 to make the call letters of its simulcasting stations similar.

WENI eventually ended up in the hands of Sound Communications, which by 2018 was an affiliated company with Waypoint Media. In late 2019, Sound and Waypoint struck an agreement to be acquired by Standard Media, a sale that was never consummated; Seven Mountains Media then purchased the stations in 2021.

On January 20, 2022, WENI changed its format to classic country branded as "Bigfoot Legends", as a cross-branding operation with its mainstream country sister stations, "Bigfoot Country".

== Alumni ==
- Bill Diehl
- Vinnie Ferrari
