= WZHD =

Radio station in Canaseraga, New York

Simulcast with WQRS Salamanca
- Canaseraga, New York; United States
- Broadcast area: Hornell
- Frequency: 97.1 MHz (HD Radio)
- Branding: The GOAT 96.3-97.1-98.3-98.7

Programming
- Format: Classic rock
- Subchannels: HD2: WMTT simulcast; HD3: WNKI simulcast

Ownership
- Owner: Seven Mountains Media; (Southern Belle, LLC)
- Sister stations: WKPQ

History
- First air date: 2010
- Former call signs: WZHD (2009–2020); WOBF (2020–2021)
- Call sign meaning: Similar to former simulcast partner WPHD

Technical information
- Licensing authority: FCC
- Facility ID: 165342
- Class: A
- ERP: 3,900 watts
- HAAT: 95 meters (312 ft)
- Transmitter coordinates: 42°24′06″N 77°39′37″W
- Translator: 95.1 W237FI (Hornell)

Links
- Public license information: Public file; LMS
- Webcast: Listen live
- Website: goatrockradio.com

WZHD (97.1 FM) is a classic rock-formatted radio station licensed to Canaseraga, New York, United States. It serves the Hornell–Dansville area and simulcasts programming from WQRS (98.3 FM), serving the Elmira, New York radio market. The station is owned by Seven Mountains Media.

On July 3, 2020, WZHD, along with its then-simulcast partner WPHD (96.1 FM), changed their call letters to WOBF and WCBF respectively, and flipped to country as "Bigfoot Country 95, 96, & 97", with both stations trimulcasting on WQBF. This was part of a five station format swap that was done by Seven Mountains Media, the owner of WOBF.

On June 18, 2021, WOBF changed their call letters back to WZHD and switched from a simulcast of WCBF back to a simulcast of classic hits-formatted WPHD (98.7 FM).

On October 1, 2024, WZHD changed their format from a simulcast of WPHD to a simulcast of classic rock-formatted WQRS 98.3 FM Salamanca, branded as "The G.O.A.T.".
