= WLVY (AM) =

Coordinates: 42°07′11.3″N 76°48′35.8″W

- Elmira Heights–Horseheads, New York; United States
- Broadcast area: Corning-Elmira
- Frequency: 1600 kHz
- Branding: 94 Rock

Programming
- Format: Contemporary hits

Ownership
- Owner: Dave Radigan; (Radigan Broadcasting Group, LLC)

History
- First air date: July 4, 1956
- Former call signs: WEHH (1955–2023)

Technical information
- Licensing authority: FCC
- Facility ID: 55271
- Class: B
- Power: 5,000 watts (day); 170 watts (night)
- Translators: 93.9 W230BB (Elmira) 96.7 W244EC (Corning); 106.5 W293CZ (Elmira Heights–Horseheads)
- Repeaters: 1550 WTXW (Towanda, PA); 107.7 W299CM (Athens, PA)

Links
- Public license information: Public file; LMS
- Website: myhometowntoday.com/94-rock

WLVY (1600 AM) is a commercial radio station licensed to Elmira Heights and Horseheads, New York, United States, and serving the Southern Tier of New York. It is owned by Radigan Broadcastng Group, LLC and airs a contemporary hit radio format.

The studios, offices and transmitter are on Lake Street in Elmira. Programming is also heard on four FM translator stations, 93.9 MHz (W230BB) in Elmira, 96.7 MHz (W244EC) in Corning, 106.5 MHz (W293CZ) in Elmira Heights-Horseheads, and 107.7 MHz (W299CM) in Waverly/Athens/Sayre (whose parent signal is 1550 khz WTXW in Towanda, PA which simulcasts 94 Rock/WLVY).

== History ==
=== Early years ===
WLVY signed on the air on July 4, 1956, with the call sign WEHH. Its original frequency was 1590 AM. WEHH was the third AM radio station in Chemung County and the fifth in the Elmira-Corning market in New York state. Testing on the frequency may have begun as early as 1952, according to documents at the original transmitter site found by former station engineer Jim Appleton.

It originally broadcast at 500 watts, with a non-directional pattern, only on the air during daylight hours. The studios were over Oldroyd's Grocery Store on Hanover Square in Horseheads. Later, a new studio facility was constructed on Latta Brook Road east of Route 17 in the town of Horseheads. When an overpass was built on Latta Brook Road at Route 17, the new studio was in the construction area and demolished. Another facility was built just east of the Route 17 overpass (Latta Brook Road has no interchange with the highway). For years, the studio location was identified on-air as Latta Brook Park and during weather reports the forecast was always ended with "the current temperature is ... in beautiful Latta Brook Park." The single tower non-directional antenna was fed by a Collins 550A transmitter in a field across the highway from the station. It stood until a storm in the early 2000s blew it down across Latta Brook Road, according to Appleton.

=== Top 40 and oldies years ===
The station, founded by Frank P. Saia, was owned by the Elmira Heights-Horseheads Broadcasting Company (family owned) for many years and was the first rock'n'roll station in the market. In the late 1950s and throughout the 1960s, area teenagers listened to RadioActive WEHH, Superhit Radio WEHH, and finally Rainbow Radio WEHH. Ed "Knucklehead" Knowles was the station's leading personality in the late '50s and early '60s. He did many Record Hops in the area with his engineer Rod Denson. Other DJs during that time were Bob Welch and Lou Coughlin. In the 1950s and 1960s, students rushed to the nearest drugstore for their free copy of the WEHH Fabulous 50, which detailed the 50 top hit songs of the day. A stack of the Fabulous 50s was found in the basement of the Latta Brook Road studio when the station moved out in the early 2000s.

By the early 1970s, the format had changed to easy listening with Frank at the helm. In the 1980s, Ray Ross bought the station and switched the format to oldies. The station also broadcast Elmira Pioneers' minor league and local Little League baseball games, as well as high school football and Elmira College hockey games. Under Ray's ownership, the station's broadcast day expanded to midnight, then to 24 hours a day, but at very low power after sunset. Among personalities on-air during this time were Norm Stull, Chris Sando, Scott Iddings, Jane MacNett, James Wilson, Pamela Kauffman, Ray Smith, Mike Owens, with Russ Ross and his father/owner/DJ Ray Ross. Nationally syndicated programs hosted by Bruce "Cousin Brucie" Morrow and Casey "Shaggy" Kasem were also highlighted on WEHH during the '80s.

Seeking to fill a niche in the market in the early 1990s, Ross switched the format to adult standards. By the end of the decade, the station was being operated at the WELM and WLVY studios by the Pembrook Pines Media Group under a local marketing agreement.

=== Adding an FM signal ===
WEHH was a standalone AM station for much of its existence until Frank Saia decided to put an FM station on the air in the mid-1960s. Frank Saia believed in the future of FM broadcasting and was responsible for WEHH-FM, which signed on at 94.3 MHz in 1964, with Elmira as its city of license. Studios were co-located with WEHH in Latta Brook Park. The transmitter was located at a private site on East Hill in Elmira. The station broadcast mainly easy listening and classical music along with a bit of country music in the mornings, "The Ralph Emery Show." In the 1970s, WEHH-FM broadcast Elmira City Council meetings live with Tony Volino handling the remote duties from the Council Chambers. Frank Saia, before the founding of WENY-TV, also had the first crack at UHF TV channel 36 and at one time considered putting a WEHH-TV on channel 36. But those plans did not materialize.

The FM station later was sold to crosstown rival WELM and changed to the call sign WLVY. In 1990, Ross also was instrumental in getting a new station on-the-air on 96.9 MHz. That station—then known as WMKB—was never owned by Ross, but later was signed on as contemporary Christian station WREQ. For a brief time, WMKB simulcast the WEHH signal. Ross formally sold WEHH to Pembrook Pines in 1999, after which it went dark for several months.

=== Adding a translator ===
It returned to the air in 2000 24/7 with reduced nighttime power, directional at 1600 kHz, using a satellite-delivered adult standards format. The station now uses three towers off Lake Street in Elmira. A translator station was added to simulcast the programming on FM.

From September 2013 until some time in spring 2014, WEHH simulcast on WGGO and WOEN, two sister stations in Cattaraugus County, as Sound Communications prepared to buy the Pembrook Pines station cluster. Antitrust concerns were raised about the sale. (Sound already owned a large number of stations in Elmira.) As a result, WEHH was spun off to a different owner, forcing the end of the trimulcast. Tower Broadcasting is the current owner of WLVY. The company was led by Gordon Ichikawa, who, as his company name implies, specializes mainly in ownership of broadcast towers.

WLVY is one of a handful of broadcast stations in the U.S. to carry a dual city of license. The station is licensed to both Elmira Heights and Horseheads.

=== WLVY simulcast and call sign change ===
On January 2, 2023, WEHH changed their format from adult standards to a simulcast of Hot AC-formatted WLVY 94.3 FM Elmira. The programming moved to WEHH full time and the simulcast ended shortly afterward, following the consummation of the sale of WLVY to Family Life Ministries and its switch to a Christian radio format as WCIH. 94 Rock moved from 94.3 FM to 93.9 FM while it simulcasts over AM 1600 and other FM translators at 96.7 in Corning, 106.5 in Horseheads, and 107.7 in the Valley. WEHH assumed the WLVY call sign on January 20, 2023.

WLVY went silent in July 2026 as the Radigan family, which acquired the station from Ichikawa's estate after the later's death, lost ownership of the station's broadcast tower site.
