= WCIH (FM) =

Radio station in Elmira, New York

- Elmira, New York; United States
- Broadcast area: Elmira-Corning area
- Frequency: 94.3 MHz
- Branding: Family Life

Programming
- Format: Christian

Ownership
- Owner: Family Life Network; (Family Life Ministries, Inc.)

History
- First air date: August 1, 1966 (as WEHH-FM)
- Former call signs: WEHH-FM (1965–1976); WLVY (1976–2023)
- Call sign meaning: "Where Christ is Honored"

Technical information
- Licensing authority: FCC
- Facility ID: 52122
- Class: A
- ERP: 1,200 watts
- HAAT: 224 meters (735 ft)
- Transmitter coordinates: 42°7′51″N 76°47′26″W

Links
- Public license information: Public file; LMS
- Webcast: Listen live
- Website: familylife.org

WCIH (94.3 FM) is a radio station broadcasting a Christian radio format. Licensed to Elmira, New York, United States, the station serves the Elmira-Corning area. The station is currently owned by Family Life Ministries, Inc.

== History ==
The station was signed on by Frank Saia on August 1, 1966, as WEHH-FM, a sister station of WEHH. It was Chemung County's first FM station. The station broadcast mainly easy listening and classical music along with a bit of country in the mornings, "The Ralph Emery Show". In the 1970s, WEHH-FM broadcast Elmira City Council meetings live, with Tony Volino handling the remote duties from the Council Chambers.

In 1976, Saia sold the station to Condit Communications, then-owner of crosstown rival WELM. Condit changed the call sign to WLVY on March 3, 1976, and the format changed to AOR. The station first was known as "Y94", but later rebranded as "Love Rock", presumably because of the existence of Y94 in relatively nearby Syracuse. Eventually, the station came to be known simply as "94 Rock".

In the early to mid-1980s, the station's programming evolved into more of a Top 40/CHR format first with a rock, new wave/modern rock, and heavy metal emphasis first and then with a dash of bubblegum pop, dance, R&B, freestyle, and hip-hop emphasis to the mix.

Since the 1980s, 94 Rock had been consistently among the market leaders in the Arbitron ratings.

On October 3, 2022, Tower Broadcasting, LLC filed paperwork with the FCC to transfer the license of WLVY to the Family Life Network, a large regional Christian radio operator out of nearby Bath, in exchange for the license to translator W293CE and $450,000.

On January 2, 2023, it was announced that the station's format would move to WEHH and WELM. The sale to Family Life Ministries was consummated on January 5, and the station changed its call sign to WCIH on January 14, 2023.

== Translators ==
WCIH recently obtained the frequency 93.7 for Waverly listeners. The 120-watt translator improves the station's signal in "The Valley," which consists of Waverly and South Waverly, Sayre and Athens in Bradford County, Pennsylvania. It can be received in an area roughly bounded by Southport, Van Etten and Owego in New York and Towanda, Pennsylvania.

The station has a 50-watt translator on 93.7 in Corning. It can be received roughly between Big Flats, Lindley, Addison, Campbell and the Schuyler County line in and around the Meads Creek Valley.
