= South Corning, New York =

- Village
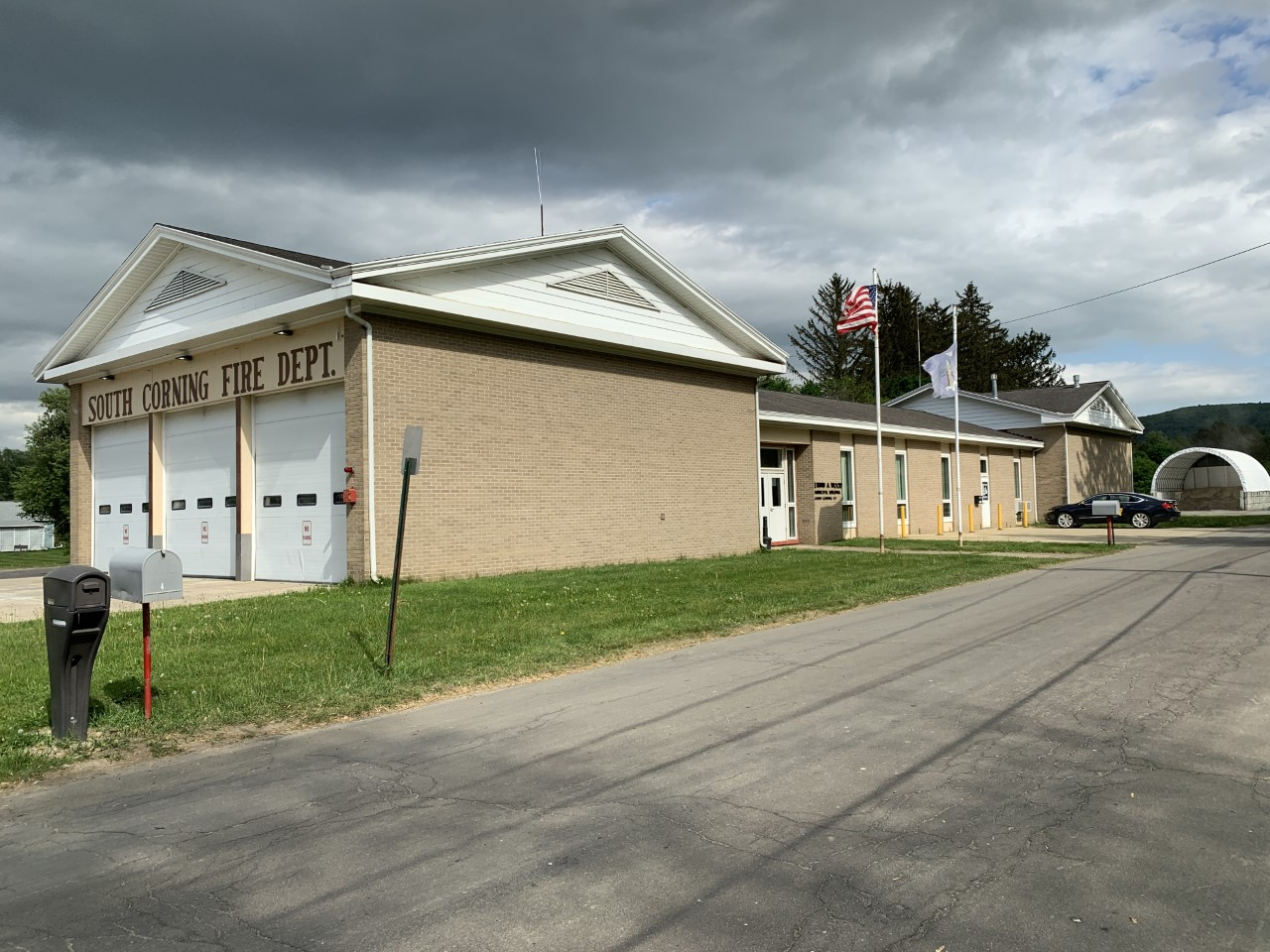

- Location within the state of New York
- Coordinates: 42°7′28″N 77°2′8″W
- Country: United States
- State: New York
- County: Steuben

Area
  - Total: 0.62 sq mi (1.60 km^{2})
  - Land: 0.62 sq mi (1.60 km^{2})
  - Water: 0 sq mi (0.00 km^{2})
- Elevation: 950 ft (290 m)

Population (2020)
  - Total: 1,108
  - Density: 1,796.7/sq mi (693.72/km^{2})
- Time zone: UTC-5 (Eastern (EST))
  - Summer (DST): UTC-4 (EDT)
- FIPS code: 36-68847
- GNIS feature ID: 0965727

South Corning is a village in Steuben County, New York, United States. As of the 2020 census, South Corning had a population of 1,108. The village is in the town of the same name.

== Geography ==
South Corning is located at 42°7′28″N 77°2′8″W (42.124442, -77.035463). According to the United States Census Bureau, the village has a total area of 0.6 square miles (1.6 km^{2}), all land. The village is near the western bank of the Chemung River and is south of the City of Corning. Bailey Creek flows through the village toward the Chemung River. New York State Route 225 passes through the village.

== Demographics ==
Historical population
Census	Pop.	Note	%±
1930	714		—
1940	681		−4.6%
1950	880		29.2%
1960	1,448		64.5%
1970	1,414		−2.3%
1980	1,195		−15.5%
1990	1,025		−14.2%
2000	1,147		11.9%
2010	1,145		−0.2%
2020	1,108		−3.2%
U.S. Decennial Census

As of the census of 2000, there were 1,147 people, 492 households, and 319 families residing in the village. The population density was 1,866.3 inhabitants per square mile (720.6/km^{2}). There were 512 housing units at an average density of 833.1 per square mile (321.7/km^{2}). The racial makeup of the village was 90.76% White, 7.24% African American, 0.09% Native American, 1.13% Asian, 0.26% from other races, and 0.52% from two or more races. Hispanic or Latino of any race were 0.61% of the population.

There were 492 households, out of which 29.7% had children under the age of 18 living with them, 48.4% were married couples living together, 11.0% had a female householder with no husband present, and 35.0% were non-families. 29.5% of all households were made up of individuals, and 12.0% had someone living alone who was 65 years of age or older. The average household size was 2.33 and the average family size was 2.86.

In the village, the population was spread out, with 23.6% under the age of 18, 6.7% from 18 to 24, 30.6% from 25 to 44, 21.3% from 45 to 64, and 17.8% who were 65 years of age or older. The median age was 39 years. For every 100 females, there were 92.4 males. For every 100 females age 18 and over, there were 88.0 males.

The median income for a household in the village was $40,455, and the median income for a family was $48,828. Males had a median income of $33,558 versus $28,750 for females. The per capita income for the village was $21,733. About 5.0% of families and 7.8% of the population were below the poverty line, including 14.5% of those under age 18 and 1.4% of those age 65 or over.

The late Rick Bonnell, a National Basketball Association writer for the Charlotte Observer, was born and raised in the Village of South Corning.

== Education ==
It is in the Corning City School District.
