= WELM =

Simulcasts WATS Sayre, Pennsylvania
- Elmira, New York; United States
- Broadcast area: Elmira, New York
- Frequency: 1410 kHz
- Branding: Liberty 960

Programming
- Format: news/talk

Ownership
- Owner: Gordon Ichikawa; (Tower Broadcasting LLC)

History
- First air date: 1947
- Call sign meaning: W ELMira

Technical information
- Licensing authority: FCC
- Facility ID: 52120
- Class: B
- Power: 5,000 watts day 1,000 watts night
- Transmitter coordinates: 42°07′11″N 76°48′37″W
- Translator: 106.5 W293CZ (Elmira)

Links
- Public license information: Public file; LMS
- Website: www.myhometowntoday.com/liberty-960

WELM signed on in 1947 as Chemung County's second radio station and the Elmira-Corning, New York market's third. It broadcasts on 1410 kHz. The station uses a three-tower array, broadcasting with 5,000 watts from a single tower until sundown, when the power is reduced to 1,000 watts and the pattern becomes directional from all three towers.

In its early years, it produced several local programs, including the 6:00 News, with newscaster Gordon M. Ridenour, from 1947-1948. In the sixties, the station was home to a popular morning program "Stan and Russ on the Bus" hosted by Stan Douglas and Bill Russell. After that program left the air, Douglas continued to be involved with the station by hosting a well-received Sunday morning polka music program. For a time in the sixties and early seventies, there was also a Saturday evening jazz program, "Twentieth Century Jazz" hosted by John "Cappy" Caparulo. For most of its history, the station was affiliated with CBS Radio, and ran many network based shows including News on the Hour, CBS Mystery Theatre and Music and the Spoken Word.

It was the market's dominant Top 40 station in the early 1970s, but in 1975 the station was purchased by New England broadcaster Robert Condit, who controversially changed the format to easy listening and middle-of-the-road standards, angering listeners and driving away the station's on-air staff. The move was a failure, and the format gradually shifted to adult contemporary in the later part of the decade. By 1990, it had become an oldies station. Later, the station would switch to an all sports format.

In 2019, the all-sports format was changed to Classic Rock Gold with selective sports programming from MRN and local highschool sports. Also continue to air sports updates from CBS and NBC.

== History ==
James Robert Meachem sold the station to Corning Leader Inc. for $110,000 plus a five-year employment contract.

== Jeff Whittaker and Pat Salois ==
Jeff Whittaker and Pat Salois were popular personalities on the station, voicing several original characters on Salois' evening show in the early 1980s and later hosting the morning drive and afternoon drive shows.

One of their characters—the Lake Welmer Swamp Monster—developed a following throughout the community. The mythic creature allegedly lived in "Lake Welmer," their nickname (which has stuck) for a swampy area between Lake Street and Grand Central Avenue near the station's three towers. They referred to the creature often in bits, and sometimes produced "news reports" in which an intrepid reporter would try to interview the monster. The responses typically were clips of lyrics from popular songs (clearly influenced by Buchanan and Goodman's "Flying Saucer")

Whittaker and Salois later hosted the morning show until late 1995, when they were released and the station format was changed to sports. Both were in poor health at the time—about which they often joked on the air—and died within a few years. At Whittaker's viewing, Salois came in—oxygen tank in tow—and said, "I win," in reference to a bet over who would die first.

== Previous sports programming ==
WELM is currently affiliated with CBS Sports Radio.

Bob Michaels, a well-known sports broadcaster in the market, was a personality on the station from the switch to sports until he started his own sports broadcasting company in 2010.

== WLVY simulcast ==
On January 2, 2023, WELM changed their format from sports to a simulcast of top 40/CHR-formatted WLVY 94.3 FM Elmira. The programming moved to WELM full time and the simulcast ended shortly afterward, following the consummation of the sale of WLVY to Family Life Ministries and its switch to a Christian radio format as WCIH.

The station, 1410 WELM most recently simulcast WATS 960 AM Sayre, Pennsylvania. WELM and WLVY went silent in July 2026 as the Radigan family, which acquired the station from Gordon Ichikawa's estate after the later's death, lost ownership of the stations' broadcast tower site.

== Alumni ==
Ken Chiampou of the "John & Ken Show"
Howard Simon WGR Buffalo
