= WENI-FM =

Radio station in South Waverly, Pennsylvania

Simulcasts WMTT-FM Tioga
- South Waverly, Pennsylvania; United States
- Broadcast area: Elmira–Corning, New York
- Frequency: 92.7 MHz
- Branding: The Met Rocks

Programming
- Format: Classic rock
- Affiliations: Compass Media Networks

Ownership
- Owner: Seven Mountains Media; (Southern Belle, LLC)
- Sister stations: WENI, WMAJ, WPHD

History
- First air date: October 30, 2003 (as WPHD at 96.1)
- Former call signs: WMTG (2000–2003); WPHD (2003–2017); WENY-FM (2017)
- Former frequencies: 96.1 MHz (2003–2017)
- Call sign meaning: similar to WENY

Technical information
- Licensing authority: FCC
- Facility ID: 77925
- Class: A
- ERP: 1,250 watts
- HAAT: 221 meters (725 ft)
- Transmitter coordinates: 42.032°N 76.784°W

Links
- Public license information: Public file; LMS
- Webcast: Listen live
- Website: themetrocks.com

WENI-FM (92.7 MHz) is a radio station licensed by the Federal Communications Commission (FCC) to serve the community of South Waverly, Pennsylvania (located south of Waverly, New York). Starting in early 2010, the then-WPHD moved to Comfort Hill in Ashland, New York, just south of Elmira. WENI-FM is located on the same radio tower as Elmira-licensed WCBF. WENI-FM now has one of the strongest signals in Chemung County, New York, and the greater Elmira area.

== History ==
At one time, the call sign WPHD was assigned to FM station WMTT (94.7 FM) in Tioga, Pennsylvania, but changed in 2005. WMTT remains a sister station of WPHD. WMTT is co-located within the WPHD studios located on Chemung Street in Horseheads, New York.

In 2017, owner Europa Communications filed to swap the license for WPHD to Sound Communications in exchange for the license to WENY-FM. The station swap was consummated on November 15, 2017, along with the formats. Additionally, the stations swapped call signs on November 20, 2017. On December 8, 2017, WENY-FM moved from 96.1 FM to 92.7 FM. The station swapped call signs with its Big Flats, New York–based sister station on December 27, 2017, assuming the WENI-FM call sign. The trade was largely a legal fiction to allow both stations to swap cities of license and allow each station's respective owners to make potential expansions (as Europa's stations were mostly rimshots that did not count toward FCC ownership caps the same way in-market stations do).

Standard Media announced its purchase of Sound Communications and its affiliated companies in November 2019, however, the sale collasped and were to Seven Mountains Media in 2021.

In June 2021 WENI-FM changed their format from adult contemporary, which moved to WENY (1230 AM), to classic rock, branded as "The Met"; this format moved from WMTT-FM (100.9) in Horseheads, which had been acquired by the Family Life Network and became WCID.

== Previous logo ==
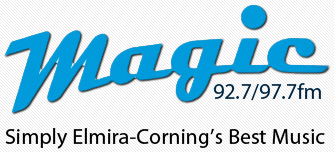
