= WCIM (FM) =

- Montour Falls, New York; United States
- Broadcast area: Elmira-Corning area
- Frequency: 104.9 MHz
- Branding: Family Life Network

Programming
- Format: Christian radio

Ownership
- Owner: Family Life Ministries
- Sister stations: WCDR

History
- First air date: 1973 (as WXXY)
- Former call signs: WXXY (1971–1982); WNGZ (1982–2020); WPHD (2020–2021)

Technical information
- Licensing authority: FCC
- Facility ID: 49449
- Class: A
- ERP: 1,000 watts
- HAAT: 146 meters (479 ft)
- Transmitter coordinates: 42°12′00″N 76°51′30″W

Links
- Public license information: Public file; LMS
- Webcast: Listen Live
- Website: familylife.org

WCIM (104.9 FM) is a Christian radio station as part of the Family Life Network. Licensed to Montour Falls, New York and broadcasting to the Elmira-Corning area, the station was acquired by Family Life Ministries in 2021.

== History ==
In 2020, WNGZ moved to the 93.1 frequency (with the WNGZ calls parked on AM 1490 in Watkins Glen) and tweaked to a full blown active rock format using the moniker The New Rock Edge. (Undated, WNGZ (AM) 1490 dropped the Wingz 93 rock simulcast and changed to classic hits as My Cool Radio). On July 3, 2020, WNGZ changed its callsign to WPHD and flipped to classic hits as part of a five-station frequency swap.

In June 2021, WPHD changed its format from classic hits (which moved to WGMM 98.7 FM Corning) to Family Life Network's religious format under new WCIM calls.
