= WPHD (FM) =

Radio station in Corning, New York

- Corning, New York; United States
- Broadcast area: Elmira, New York
- Frequency: 98.7 MHz
- Branding: Cool Radio

Programming
- Format: Classic hits

Ownership
- Owner: Seven Mountains Media; (Southern Belle, LLC)
- Sister stations: WENI, WMAJ, WENI-FM

History
- First air date: 1989 (as WCBA-FM)
- Former call signs: WCBA-FM (1987–June 2005); WGMM-FM (June-June 2005); WGMM (June 2005–2021)

Technical information
- Licensing authority: FCC
- Facility ID: 19651
- Class: A
- ERP: 1,200 watts
- HAAT: 220 meters (722 feet)
- Transmitter coordinates: 42°08′31″N 77°04′40″W

Links
- Public license information: Public file; LMS
- Webcast: Listen live
- Website: mycoolradio.com

WPHD (98.7 MHz, "Cool Radio") is an FM radio station licensed to serve Corning, New York, United States. The station is owned by Seven Mountains Media, through licensee Southern Belle, LLC.

It broadcasts a classic hits music format to the Elmira, New York, metropolitan area.

== History ==
This station received its original construction permit from the Federal Communications Commission on July 2, 1987. The new station was assigned the call letters WCBA-FM by the FCC on December 3, 1987. WCBA-FM received its license to cover from the FCC on March 23, 1990.

In April 1990, licensee Dean J. Slack reached an agreement to sell this station to Eolin Broadcasting, Inc. The deal was approved by the FCC on May 21, 1990, and the transaction was consummated on June 8, 1990.

Completing a swap between sister stations where the former WGMM became WCBA-FM (now WCIG) and this station, WCBA-FM's call letters were changed to WGMM-FM by the FCC on May 16, 2005. Just six weeks later, the station was assigned the call sign WGMM by the FCC on June 29, 2005.

In June 2021, WGMM rebranded as "Cool Radio" following the acquisition of the station by Seven Mountains Media. On June 23, 2021, WGMM changed their call letters to WPHD.
