= WPGM (AM) =

- Danville, Pennsylvania; United States
- Frequency: 1570 kHz

Programming
- Format: Religious

Ownership
- Owner: Montrose Broadcasting Corporation

History
- First air date: 1963
- Former call signs: WBDS (1963-64)
- Call sign meaning: We Proclaim God’s Message

Technical information
- Licensing authority: FCC
- Facility ID: 43662
- Class: B
- Power: 2500 watts day 221 watts night
- Transmitter coordinates: 40°59′10.00″N 76°37′37.00″W

Links
- Public license information: Public file; LMS
- Webcast: Listen live
- Website: wpgmfm.org

WPGM (1570 AM) is a radio station broadcasting a religious format. Licensed to Danville, Pennsylvania, United States, the station is currently owned by Montrose Broadcasting Corporation.
