= WCIG =

- Big Flats, New York; United States
- Broadcast area: Elmira–Corning, New York
- Frequency: 97.7 MHz
- Branding: Family Life Network

Programming
- Format: Christian radio

Ownership
- Owner: Family Life Network; (Family Life Ministries, Inc.)

History
- First air date: August 28, 1987 (as WNBR)
- Former call signs: WNBR (1987–1989); WGMM (1989–2005); WCBA-FM (2005); WENI-FM (2005–2017); WENY-FM (2017–2021)
- Call sign meaning: "Where Christ is Glorified"

Technical information
- Licensing authority: FCC
- Facility ID: 14713
- Class: A
- ERP: 610 watts
- HAAT: 220 meters (720 ft)
- Transmitter coordinates: 42°8′31″N 77°4′40″W

Links
- Public license information: Public file; LMS
- Website: familylife.org/radio/

WCIG (97.7 FM) is a radio station broadcasting a Christian radio format. Licensed to Big Flats, New York, United States, the station is owned by Family Life Network.

== History ==
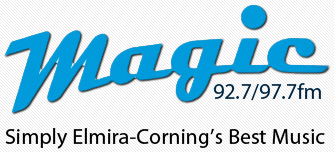
Logo as "Magic"

The station was assigned the call letters WNBR on August 28, 1987. On March 1, 1989, the station changed its call sign to WGMM; on May 16, 2005, to WCBA-FM; and on July 26, 2005, to WENI-FM. The station swapped call signs with its sister station in South Waverly, Pennsylvania, on December 27, 2017, assuming the WENY-FM call sign.

On June 1, 2021, WENY-FM changed its format from adult contemporary to Family Life Network's Christian radio format, assuming the call sign WCIG on June 22, 2021.
