= Double O Radio =

Radio broadcasting company, 2003–2011

- Industry: radio broadcasting
- Founded: 2003
- Defunct: 2011
- Fate: Merged with Townsquare Media in 2011
- Headquarters: Charleston, South Carolina, U.S.,
- Key people: Terry Bond (CEO) Bob Pittman
- Products: Mass media
- Parent: Pilot Group LLC

Double O Radio was a privately held media corporation with corporate headquarters in Charleston, South Carolina. At its peak, Double O Radio owned 28 radio stations in the United States.

On August 8, 2011, Double O announced it would merge with Townsquare Media and become part of the Oaktree Capital Management broadcast empire.

The clusters in Panama City, Florida, and Columbia, South Carolina, were not part of the transaction, and continued to be held by Double O's parent company, Pilot Group LLC. The Panama City cluster would be spun off on April 11, 2012 to Louisiana-based Powell Broadcasting for $950,000. The Columbia stations would later be spun off to a local broadcaster, Hometown Columbia.

== U.S. radio stations owned by Double O Radio ==
=== Central New York ===
- WBKT 95.3 FM, Norwich
- WCHN 970 AM, Norwich
- WDLA 1270 AM, Walton
- WDLA-FM 92.1, Walton
- WDHI 100.3 FM, Delhi
- WIYN 94.7 FM, Deposit
- WKXZ 93.9 FM, Norwich
- WZOZ 103.1 FM, Oneonta
- WSRK 103.9 FM, Oneonta
- WDOS 730 AM, Oneonta
- WTBD-FM 97.5, Delhi

=== Columbia, South Carolina ===
- WWNU 92.1 FM, Irmo
- WWNQ 94.3 FM, Forest Acres

=== Panama City, Florida ===
- WASJ 105.1 FM, Panama City Beach
- WKNK 103.5 FM, Callaway
- WPFM 107.9 FM, Panama City
- WRBA 95.9 FM, Springfield

=== Odessa-Midland, Texas ===
- KHKX 99.1 FM, Odessa
- KMCM 96.9 FM, Odessa
- KQRX 95.1 FM, Midland

=== San Angelo, Texas ===
- KELI 98.7 FM, San Angelo
- KKCN 103.1 FM, Ballinger
- KGKL 960 AM, San Angelo
- KGKL-FM 97.5, San Angelo
- KNRX 96.5 FM, Sterling City

=== Missouri ===
- KRRY 100.9 FM, Canton
- KICK-FM 97.9, Palmyra
- KHMO 1070 AM, Hannibal
- KSDL 92.3 FM, Sedalia
- KSIS 1050 AM, Sedalia
- KXKX 105.7 FM, Knob Noster
- WLIQ 1530 AM, Quincy, IL
