= WCHN =

Norwich, New York; United States
- Broadcast area: Oneonta, New York
- Frequency: 970 kHz
- Branding: CNY News

Programming
- Format: Defunct (was news/talk)
- Affiliations: Fox News Radio; NBC News Radio; Compass Media Networks; Premiere Networks; Radio America; Westwood One

Ownership
- Owner: Townsquare Media; (Townsquare License, LLC)
- Sister stations: WBKT, WDHI, WDLA, WDLA-FM, WDOS, WIYN, WKXZ, WSRK, WTBD-FM, WZOZ

History
- First air date: January 3, 1953
- Last air date: February 2023

Technical information
- Licensing authority: FCC
- Facility ID: 13826
- Class: D
- Power: 1,000 watts day; 34 watts night
- Transmitter coordinates: 42°30′23″N 75°29′34″W

Links
- Public license information: Public file; LMS
- Webcast: Listen live
- Website: cnynews.com

WCHN (970 AM) was a radio station broadcasting a news/talk format. Licensed to Norwich, New York, United States, the station was owned by Townsquare Media. WCHN featured programming from Fox News Radio, NBC News Radio, Compass Media Networks, Premiere Networks, Radio America, and Westwood One.

The station went silent in February 2023. Townsquare surrendered WCHN's license to the Federal Communications Commission on January 29, 2024, and the FCC cancelled it on February 6.
