= WDOS =

- Oneonta, New York; United States
- Frequency: 730 kHz
- Branding: CNY News

Programming
- Format: News/talk
- Affiliations: Fox News Radio; NBC News Radio; Compass Media Networks; Premiere Networks; Radio America; Westwood One

Ownership
- Owner: Townsquare Media; (Townsquare License, LLC)
- Sister stations: WBKT; WDLA; WDLA-FM; WKXZ; WSRK; WZOZ

History
- First air date: November 26, 1947
- Last air date: June 2025

Technical information
- Licensing authority: FCC
- Facility ID: 68738
- Class: D
- Power: 1,000 watts day; 8 watts night
- Transmitter coordinates: 42°27′28.3″N 75°0′17.6″W
- Repeater: 1270 WDLA (Walton)

Links
- Public license information: Public file; LMS
- Webcast: Listen live
- Website: cnynews.com

WDOS (730 AM) was a radio station broadcasting a news/talk format. Licensed to Oneonta, New York, United States, the station was owned by Townsquare Media. It featured programming from Fox News Radio, NBC News Radio, Compass Media Networks, Premiere Networks, Radio America, and Westwood One.

In June 2025 WDOS went silent; Townsquare would subsequently relaunch a news/talk format on WKXZ, though with a simulcast of WNBF from Binghamton (including its local content) instead of the entirely-syndicated lineup carried by WDOS. Townsquare returned the WDOS license to the Federal Communications Commission for cancellation in May 2026. It was cancelled on June 4, 2026.
