= WCER (FM) =

- Delhi, New York; United States
- Frequency: 97.5 MHz

Programming
- Format: Christian radio
- Network: Family Life Network

Ownership
- Owner: Family Life Ministries, Inc.
- Sister stations: WCEB; WCEG

History
- First air date: April 2008
- Former call signs: WTBD-FM (2007–2024)

Technical information
- Licensing authority: FCC
- Facility ID: 164165
- Class: A
- ERP: 6,000 watts
- HAAT: 100 meters (330 ft)
- Transmitter coordinates: 42°14′9.3″N 74°57′10.5″W

Links
- Public license information: Public file; LMS

WCER (97.5 MHz) is a radio station licensed to Delhi, New York. WCER is owned by Family Life Ministries.

== History ==
The 97.5 allocation in Delhi, New York, was added by the Federal Communications Commission (FCC) in 1999. Double O Radio won the construction permit at auction for $399,000 in 2004; it put WTBD-FM on the air in April 2008 with an adult hits format. Double O sold 26 radio stations, including WTBD-FM, to Townsquare Media in 2011. In early 2019, Townsquare closed the station's studios in Walton, which were shared with WDLA, WDLA-FM, WDHI, and WIYN; operations were moved to the company's Oneonta facility.

On December 31, 2023, WTBD-FM ceased operations; at the time of the closure, the station had a contemporary hit radio format. In May 2024, Townsquare Media sold the station, along with WDHI and WIYN (which had shut down at the same time), to the Family Life Network. WTBD-FM returned to the air October 8, 2024, and changed its call sign to WCER on December 6.
