= WCEB (FM) =

- Deposit, New York; United States
- Broadcast area: Binghamton, New York
- Frequency: 94.7 MHz

Programming
- Format: Christian radio
- Network: Family Life Network

Ownership
- Owner: Family Life Ministries, Inc.
- Sister stations: WCEG, WCER

History
- First air date: January 16, 1991; 35 years ago
- Former call signs: WIYN (1989–2024)

Technical information
- Licensing authority: FCC
- Facility ID: 16441
- Class: A
- ERP: 770 watts
- HAAT: 196 meters (643 ft)
- Transmitter coordinates: 42°1′44.2″N 75°28′23.6″W

Links
- Public license information: Public file; LMS

WCEB (94.7 MHz) is a non-commercial FM radio station licensed to Deposit, New York, and serving the Binghamton metropolitan area. The station simulcasts a Christian radio format with WCEG (100.3 FM) in Delhi. The stations are owned by Family Life Ministries.

== History ==
Delaware County Broadcasting, owner of WDLA and WDLA-FM in Walton, New York, was granted a construction permit for a new station on 94.7 in Deposit on July 27, 1989. The station, which took the call sign WIYN, signed on with a soft adult contemporary format on January 16, 1991.

Delaware County Broadcasting sold its stations—WIYN, the WDLA stations, and WDHI in Delhi—to BanJo Communications, owner of stations in nearby Norwich and Oneonta, for $865,000 in 2000. In January 2001, BanJo began simulcasting an oldies format on WIYN and WDHI. BanJo sold its stations to Double O Radio for $9.75 million in 2004.

Double O sold 26 radio stations, including WIYN and WDHI, to Townsquare Media in 2011. In early 2019, Townsquare closed the stations' studios in Walton, which were shared with the WDLA stations and WTBD-FM; operations were moved to the company's Oneonta facility. In September 2022, WIYN and WDHI shifted from classic hits to classic rock as "100.3 & 94.7 The Eagle". The stations carried the syndicated show The Free Beer and Hot Wings Show, based at then-sister WGRD-FM in Grand Rapids, Michigan, in morning drive time.

On December 31, 2023, WIYN and WDHI ceased operations. In May 2024, Townsquare Media sold the stations, along with WTBD-FM (which had shut down at the same time) to the Family Life Network. WIYN returned to the air October 8, 2024, and changed its call sign to WCEB on December 6.
