= WCEG =

- Delhi, New York; United States
- Broadcast area: Binghamton, New York
- Frequency: 100.3 MHz

Programming
- Format: Christian radio
- Network: Family Life Network

Ownership
- Owner: Family Life Ministries, Inc.
- Sister stations: WCEB, WCER

History
- First air date: March 16, 1992
- Former call signs: WDHI (1990–2024)

Technical information
- Licensing authority: FCC
- Facility ID: 16442
- Class: A
- ERP: 1,600 watts
- HAAT: 196 meters (643 ft)
- Transmitter coordinates: 42°22′43.2″N 74°50′20.5″W
- Repeater: 94.7 WCEB (Deposit)

Links
- Public license information: Public file; LMS

WCEG (100.3 FM) is an American radio station broadcasting a Christian radio format. Licensed to Delhi, New York, United States, the station is owned by Family Life Ministries. The station simulcasts with WCEB (94.7 FM) in Deposit, New York.

== History ==
Delaware County Broadcasting, owner of WDLA and WDLA-FM in Walton, New York, was granted a construction permit for a new station on 100.3 in Delhi on March 13, 1990. The station, which took the call sign WDHI, signed on with a soft adult contemporary format on March 16, 1992.

Delaware County Broadcasting sold its stations—WDHI, the WDLA stations, and WIYN in Deposit—to BanJo Communications, owner of stations in nearby Norwich and Oneonta, for $865,000 in 2000. In January 2001, BanJo began simulcasting an oldies format on WDHI and WIYN. BanJo sold its stations to Double O Radio for $9.75 million in 2004.

Double O sold 26 radio stations, including WDHI and WIYN, to Townsquare Media in 2011. In early 2019, Townsquare closed the stations' studios in Walton, which were shared with the WDLA stations and WTBD-FM; operations were moved to the company's Oneonta facility. In September 2022, WDHI and WIYN shifted their format from classic hits to classic rock as "100.3 & 94.7 The Eagle".

On December 31, 2023, WDHI and WIYN ceased operations. In May 2024, Townsquare Media sold the stations, along with WTBD-FM (which had shut down at the same time) to the Family Life Network. WDHI returned to the air October 8, 2024, and changed its call sign to WCEG on December 6.
