= WDLA =

WDLA can refer to:

- WDLA (AM), a radio station at 1270 AM licensed to Walton, New York
- WDLA-FM, a radio station at 92.1 FM licensed to Walton, New York
- W.D. La., abbreviation used in case citations for the United States District Court for the Western District of Louisiana
