= KGKL =

KGKL may refer to:

- KGKL (AM), a radio station (960 AM) licensed to San Angelo, Texas, United States
- KGKL-FM, a radio station (97.5 FM) licensed to San Angelo, Texas, United States
