= Brace Hill =

Mountain in New York, United States

- Location within New York Location within the United States

Highest point
- Elevation: 2,467 feet (752 m)
- Coordinates: 42°07′13″N 75°00′49″W

Geography
- Location: Walton, New York, U.S.
- Topo map: USGS Corbett

Brace Hill is a mountain located in the Catskill Mountains of New York east-southeast of Walton, New York. Money Point is located southeast of Brace Hill and Colchester Mountain is located northeast.
