= WCOB =

WCOB may refer to:

- WCOB (FM), a radio station (88.3 FM) licensed to serve State College, Pennsylvania, United States
- WCGV (FM), a radio station (89.9 FM) licensed to serve Cambridge Springs, Pennsylvania, which used the call sign WCOB from 2016 to 2021
- FIBA Basketball World Cup
