= WCOV =

WCOV may refer to:

- WCOV-TV, a television station (channel 22, virtual 20) licensed to serve Montgomery, Alabama, United States
- WCOV-FM, a radio station (89.1 FM) licensed to serve Friendship, New York, United States
- WCDR, a radio station (90.9 FM) licensed to serve Laporte, Pennsylvania, United States, which held the call sign WCOV-FM in 2016
- WCIP (FM), a radio station (93.7 FM) licensed to serve Clyde, New York, which held the call sign WCOV-FM from 2000 to 2016
