= Wude =

Wude may refer to:

- Wude, Chinese era name used by Emperor Gaozu of Tang during his reign (618–626)
- Wude or "martial morality", an ethical system taught in Chinese martial arts
- Wude Ayalew (born 1987), Ethiopian long-distance runner
- WUDE, a radio station (94.3 FM) licensed to serve Forest Acres, South Carolina, United States
- WYAY (FM), a radio station (106.3 FM) licensed to serve Bolivia, North Carolina, United States, which held the call sign WUDE from 2013 to 2020
- WCOR-FM, a radio station (96.7 FM) licensed to serve Lewis Run, Pennsylvania, United States, which held the call sign WUDE from 2020 to 2021

== See also ==
- Wu De (1913–1995), Chinese politician
