= Genesee Community College =

Community college in Batavia, New York, U.S.

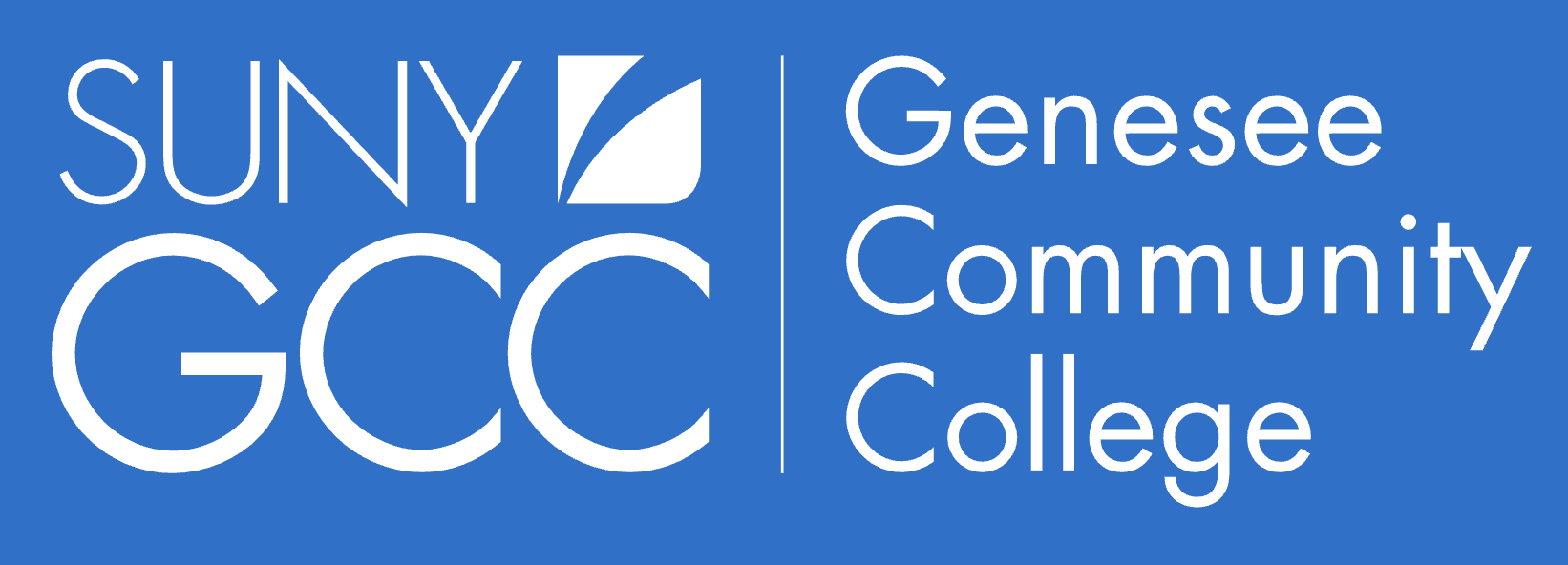
- Type: Public community college
- Established: 1966; 60 years ago
- Parent institution: State University of New York
- President: Craig R. Lamb
- Students: 4,415 (fall 2025)
- Location: Batavia, New York, U.S. 43.0159°N 78.1404°W
- Campus: Rural, 240 acres (97 ha)
- Colors: Blue & gold
- Nickname: Cougars
- Sporting affiliations: National Junior College Athletic Association, Region III
- Mascot: G-Dub
- Website: www.genesee.edu

Genesee Community College (GCC) is a public community college with its main campus in Batavia, New York. It has campus centers in Medina, Warsaw, Dansville, and Arcade, New York. The college serves areas not only inside of Genesee County but also in Livingston County, Orleans County, and Wyoming County, or the GLOW region. This two-year college also offers housing facilities to out-of-area students, although the school is attended primarily by commuters. Additionally, GCC offers some degree and certificate programs online.

== History ==
Genesee Community College was founded in 1966 as part of the State University of New York system. On September 27, 1967, Genesee Community College officially opened classes to full and part-time students. In January 1972, Genesee Community College relocated to its current permanent address on One College Road in the town of Batavia.

In 1991, GCC would see expansion with the addition of the Stuart Steiner Theatre, which houses a theater and stage, as well as expanded classrooms for the various arts programs. In 2000, the Conable Technology Building was added to the main campus facilities, a two-story 42,000-square-foot (3,900 m^{2}) annex that is the center for most of GCC's technological programs and apparatus. In January 2006, GCC expanded again, adding the Wolcott J. Humphrey III Student Union, a central location for student affairs and organizations.

In February 2009, the plans for another campus center in Lima was announced, which will replace the Lakeville satellite campus and in June 2009, construction of the campus was completed. The 9,000-square-foot (840 m^{2}) campus features two modern computer labs and a state-of-the-art science lab, five to seven classrooms, a lobby and reception area, as well as faculty, staff, advisor, and administrative offices.

Presidents of the college
| Name | Tenure |
|---|---|
| Alfred C. O’Connell | 1967–1970 |
| Cornelius V. Robbins | 1970–1975 |
| Stuart A. Steiner | 1975 – 2011 |
| James M. Sunser | 2011–2024 |
| Craig R. Lamb | 2024–present |

== Academics ==
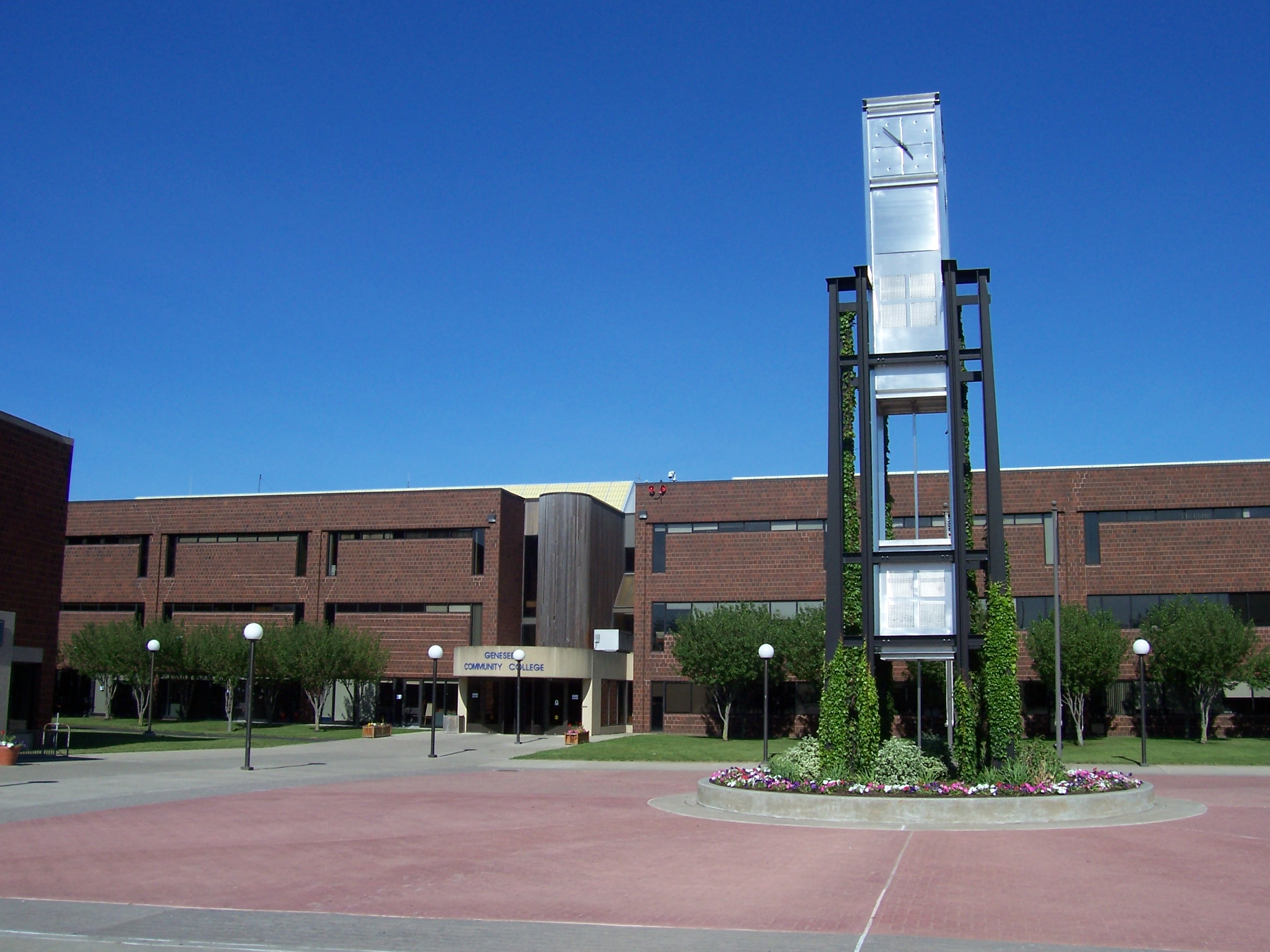
Main campus academic complex

Genesee Community College offers over 60 associate degree and certificate programs. Many students of the associate degree programs eventually transfer to four-year schools to complete their degree. College-ready students can complete their choice of 16 fully online programs at GCC.

== Athletics ==
Genesee Community College currently has 14 intercollegiate men's and women's teams in basketball, baseball, lacrosse, soccer, softball, golf, swimming, cheerleading, and volleyball. Collectively, they are known as the Cougars, and their colors are blue and gold.

== Roz Steiner Gallery ==
The Roz Steiner Gallery is Genesee Community College's (GCC) only gallery and is located in Batavia, New York, United States. The gallery is located in GCC's Center for the Arts, to the east of the Stuart Steiner Theatre lobby. The Roz Steiner Gallery opened in spring 2011. While the Steiner Gallery does not house a permanent collection, it typically features three professional exhibitions and two student-work exhibitions each academic year. The gallery was financed with funding from the State University of New York Construction Fund, and gifts from the Genesee Community College Foundation and Genesee Community College Association.

== Media ==
GCC formerly had a radio station called WGCC-FM The Music. It was heard on 90.7 FM and online. It broadcast to an approximately 25-mile (40 km) radius of the school. The station rights were sold to Family Life Ministries in late 2022 and eventually became known as WCOM-FM, transmitting out of Kendall.
