= Loomis, New York =

Loomis, New York may refer to the following places:

- Loomis, Delaware County, New York, a hamlet
- Loomis, Sullivan County, New York, a place in New York
