= Northfield, Delaware County, New York =

Northfield, New York
- Hamlet
- Location within the state of New York
- Coordinates: 42°14′49″N 75°11′20″W
- Country: United States
- State: New York
- County: Delaware
- Town: Walton
- Elevation: 1,821 ft (555 m)
- Time zone: UTC-5 (Eastern (EST))
  - Summer (DST): UTC-4 (EDT)

Northfield is a hamlet in Delaware County, New York. It is located northwest of Walton at the corner of White Hill Road and Loomis Brook Road. Kerrs Creek flows southeast through the hamlet. Teed Pond is located west and Loomis Mountain is located south-southwest of the hamlet.
