= WCOH =

WCOH may refer to:

- WCOH (FM), a radio station (107.3 FM) licensed to serve Du Bois, Pennsylvania, United States
- WRZX (AM), a radio station (1400 AM) licensed to serve Newnan, Georgia, United States, known as WCOH from 1947 to 2021

== See also ==
- Woman's Club of Hollywood (WCOH)
