= Windfall Brook =

- Location of the mouth of Windfall Brook

Location
- Country: United States
- State: New York
- County: Delaware

Physical characteristics
- Source
  - coordinates: 42°12′20″N 75°14′23″W
- Mouth: Loomis Brook
  - coordinates: 42°10′50″N 75°14′08″W
  - elevation: 1,378 ft (420 m)

Windfall Brook is a river in Delaware County, New York. It flows into Loomis Brook south-southwest of the hamlet of Loomis.
