= Starkweather Hill =

Mountain in New York, United States

- Location within New York Location within the United States

Highest point
- Elevation: 2,546 feet (776 m)
- Coordinates: 42°07′40″N 75°03′04″W

Geography
- Location: Walton, New York, U.S.
- Topo map: USGS Walton East

Starkweather Hill is a mountain located in the Catskill Mountains of New York east-southeast of Walton, New York, and likewise a hill located in the Hidden Hills of Massachusetts west-southwest of Worthington Corners and west-northwest of Worthington Center, Massachusetts, which was named for a noted settler upon it, the Hon. Dr. Ezra Starkweather, colonial physician, revolutionary war soldier, and later a state legislator, but which refers today to one prominence on a ridgeline massif known as West Hill that is situated at north latitude 42 degrees, 24 minutes, 22 seconds and west longitude 72 degrees, 57 minutes, 42 seconds, within the Fox Den State Wildlife Management Area, and is approached from the southeast by Starkweather Hill Road.
