= Everett De Morier =

American novelist

- Born: Everett Wayne De Morier; December 27, 1962 (age 63); Binghamton, New York, U.S.
- Education: State University of New York at Cortland; DeVry University
- Occupations: Humorist; author; playwright; filmmaker; novelist
- Spouse: Deborah J. Wilkins
- Children: 2
- Parent(s): Lawrence De Morier; Velma De Morier

Everett Wayne De Morier (born December 27, 1962) is an American humorist, author, playwright, documentary filmmaker and novelist.

== Life and education ==
De Morier was born in Binghamton, New York in 1962 to mother Velma and father Lawrence. De Morier spent the first twelve years of his life in the tiny town of Sanitaria Springs, New York, where his mother owned a small tropical fish store called The Mermaid Aquarium. He spent many years after that in the surrounding Binghamton, New York area, which lead him to use this location in his work later on. He graduated from Walton Central High School, Walton, New York in 1981. He also studied Communication at State University of New York at Cortland and Mechanical Engineering at DeVry University.

Lawrence De Morier, Everett's father, died in November 1990, when Everett was twenty-seven. The absence of his father is reflected in many essays he later wrote, including Father's Day.

De Morier moved to Dover, Delaware in 2007 where he lives with his wife Deborah J. De Morier (née Wilkins) and they have two children Nicholas and Alexander.

== Career ==
De Morier started his career as a non-fiction author. His two books, Crib Notes for the First Year of Marriage: A Survival Guide for Newlyweds (1997) and Crib Notes for the First Year of Fatherhood: A Survival Guide for New Fathers (1998), published by Fairview Press, were written, as their names suggest, to help first time husbands and fathers.

De Morier's most popular work is his first novel Thirty-Three Cecils (2015), published by Blydyn Square Books. The first half of the novel is placed in Binghamton, New York in 1992 and uses real local landmarks including The Belmar Pub and Lanes Deli. Riley 'Dutch' Dutcher, one of the novel's characters, lives in the same apartment at 1 Mather Street that De Morier had in the 1980s.

Thirty-Three Cecils won the top fiction prize at the 2015 London Book Festival and is currently under development as a feature film by Sunset River Productions and is planned for release in 2021. The book was also nominated for The John Gardner Fiction Prize and the Eastern Shore Writers Award.

In 2019, Blydyn Square Books released De Morier's fourth book, The Invention of Everything: Insights on Life, Food, and One Good Thermos, which was based on the best-of articles De Morier wrote for 543 Magazine.

This release of this book was also used as the framing device for the 2019 documentary Binghamton: Valley of Creativity, which De Morier wrote and helped direct. This documentary premiered at The Bundy Museum Theatre.

De Morier also wrote seven original musical scripts that were all produced and performed by Cornerstone Church of Dover, Delaware: Dover: A Christmas Story (2009 and 2010), A Gift to Remember (2011), Loockerman Letter (2012), The Mollywood Tree (2013), Finding Sergio (2014), A Little of That from Me (2015), and Welcome to Castlewood (2016). He has also written articles for In-Fisherman, Florida Keys, Bride, and Parenting magazines and is editor in chief for 543Magazine.com.

== Thirty-three Cecils Day ==
On September 1, 2022, a man named Mike Pedley visited the Belmar Pub in Binghamton, New York for the first time. He was there because this was the exact day, thirty years before, in the novel Thirty-three Cecils, that the characters, Dutch and Walker, died. Since The Belmar Pub was a central location in the novel, Pedley wanted to be there on this day to toast his favorite characters in this location.

This visit caught the attention of Binghamton locals and they decided to create an annual holiday on that day, September, 1st and call it Thirty-three Cecils Day. This holiday celebrates the idea of story.

Thirty-three Cecils Day, based on the novel of the same name by Everett De Morier, is celebrated every September 1 in Binghamton, New York.
