= WCOM-FM =

- Kendall, New York; United States
- Frequency: 90.7 MHz
- Branding: "Family Life Network"

Programming
- Format: Christian contemporary
- Network: Family Life Network

Ownership
- Owner: Family Life Ministries, Inc.

History
- First air date: 1985
- Former call signs: WGCC-FM (1985–2023)

Technical information
- Licensing authority: FCC
- Facility ID: 23603
- Class: A
- ERP: 1,250 watts
- HAAT: 112 meters (367 ft)
- Transmitter coordinates: 43°11′19″N 78°8′52″W

Links
- Public license information: Public file; LMS
- Website: www.familylife.org

WCOM-FM (90.7 FM) is an American radio station broadcasting a Christian contemporary format in Kendall, New York. The station is owned by Family Life Ministries, Inc.

WCOM-FM broadcasts with 1,250 watts effective radiated power (ERP). Its antenna has a height above average terrain (HAAT) of 112 meters (367 ft). The Federal Communications Commission (FCC) regulations for ERP and HAAT are listed under Title 47, Part 73 of the Code of Federal Regulations (CFR).

From 1985 to 2022, the station was WGCC-FM, the college radio station at Genesee Community College in Batavia, New York. It was sold to Family Life Ministries in 2023 and became WCOM-FM; it has broadcast from Kendall since 2024.

== History ==
The station, originally WGCC-FM in Batavia, New York, was first licensed on November 13, 1985, to Genesee Community College (GCC) by the Federal Communications Commission (FCC) thanks to the station's founding father, Chuck Platt. The station was later advised by GCC faculty member Barry Chow.

WGCC-FM started out as a mixed format radio station, which included some local bands, along with current favorites like Michael Jackson and The Moody Blues, as well as some classic favorites like The Beatles. At one point, WGCC-FM played some rap, but the genre was put out of rotation due to the demographics of the area at the time. The station's demographic range covered many genres, as students were allowed to play whatever type of music they chose.

Aamid a phaseout of FCC-licensed college radio in the State University of New York system, Genesee Community College surrendered WGCC-FM's license on February 25, 2022, and it was cancelled the same day; WGCC-FM rescinded the request in March and received its license back. In December 2022, the college sold WGCC-FM to Family Life Network, which planned to convert the station to its in-house contemporary Christian format. Since WGCC-FM's coverage area substantially overlaps existing owned-and-operated station WCOU in Attica, Family Life intended on relocating 90.7's city of license to Kendall as WCGI (Where Christ Grants Immortality). The sale to Family Life Network was consummated on March 27, 2023, at a price of $55,000. On September 6, 2023, the station changed its call sign to WCOM-FM. The move to Kendall took place in 2024.

== WGCC Rockfest ==
WGCC-FM hosted a concert called Rockfest. Local bands to the Rochester/Buffalo area such as Down To Earth Approach and New Skin have played at this concert. In 2000, Disturbed was the headlining band for Rockfest, but due to unfortunate circumstances, they were unable to play, thus canceling that year's show. Another band who was a hopeful for Rockfest 2006 was Kittie, but due to a previously scheduled touring event, they were scratched from the lineup. As of the fall of 2012, Rockfest was no more, and had been replaced by Play Eat and Trick or Treat, an indoor trick-or-treat activity for local children.

- 1986: WGCC 1st Anniversary Celebration

-Loosely Tight
-Trolls
-Reporter

- 2000: Monsters of Mock

-Battery
-People of the Sun
-Grafix 420
-Nic-Fit

- 2007: Benefit for Wilmot Cancer Center

-Secret Lives!
-Karate High School
-Urgency
-The Con
-Pollock
-Broken Frame

- 2008: Benefit For Salvation Army

-Take The Lead
-Amongst the Run
-The Gifted Children
-Burn Down Broadway
-The Reign of Kindo

- 2009: Benefit for WNY Make a Wish Foundation

-P-Frame
-Golden Bar
-Pam Swarts
-Red October
-Non Applicable
-Sonny Mayo Band

- 2010

-MC Chris
-Schaffer The Darklord
-James Kurdzel

- 2011: A Benefit for Pubadu

-Beard Without A Mustache
-Drew Richter
-Wyatt Coin
-Keaton
-My Friend Jane
