= KSIS =

- Sedalia, Missouri; United States
- Broadcast area: Lake of the Ozarks
- Frequency: 1050 kHz

Programming
- Format: News/talk
- Affiliations: ABC News Radio; Fox News Radio; NBC News Radio; Compass Media Networks; Premiere Networks; Radio America; Salem Radio Network; Westwood One; St. Louis Cardinals Radio Network

Ownership
- Owner: Townsquare Media; (Townsquare License, LLC)
- Sister stations: KSDL, KXKX

History
- First air date: February 18, 1954; 72 years ago

Technical information
- Licensing authority: FCC
- Facility ID: 5202
- Class: D
- Power: 1,000 watts day; 86 watts night
- Transmitter coordinates: 38°44′03″N 93°13′31″W

Links
- Public license information: Public file; LMS
- Webcast: Listen Live
- Website: ksisradio.com

KSIS (1050 AM) is a radio station licensed to serve Sedalia, Missouri, United States. The station is owned by Townsquare Media and the license is held by Townsquare License, LLC.

== Programming ==
Current weekday syndicated programming on KSIS includes Coast to Coast AM, Brian Kilmeade, Sean Hannity, Joe Pags, Gordon Deal, and Lars Larson, along with extra programming from Fox News Radio. On weekends feature Dave Ramsey on Saturdays and Ben Shapiro on Sundays. Brokered programming were also presented on both Saturday mornings and Sunday mornings, as well as simulcasts of Fox News Sunday and Meet the Press.

Throughout most of its talk period, KSIS broadcasts a blend of news, talk, and sports radio programming. The station also derives some of its news programming from ABC News Radio. Notable syndicated talk programming on KSIS over its current talk period includes weekday shows hosted by Rush Limbaugh, Sean Hannity, and Michael Medved. KSIS also airs St. Louis Cardinals baseball games as a member of the St. Louis Cardinals Radio Network.

Local real estate agent Angel Morales formerly hosted a Saturday morning Spanish language talk program called "Sábados Latinos". The name translates to "Latino Saturdays" in English. The show is part of the station's outreach to mid-Missouri's growing Latino population.

== History ==
KSIS first signed on at 1050 kHz as a 1,000 watt daytime-only station on February 18, 1954. The station was licensed to Yates Broadcasting Company, Inc., with Carl W. Yates, Jr., serving as president and general manager.

In November 1986, Yates Broadcasting Company, Inc., reached an agreement to sell this station to Bick Broadcasting Company. The deal was approved by the FCC on December 9, 1986, and the transaction was consummated on December 30, 1986.

In April 2006, Bick Broadcasting Company reached an agreement to sell this station to Double O Radio subsidiary Double O Missouri Corporation. The deal was approved by the FCC on June 30, 2006, and the transaction was consummated on August 31, 2006. Double O Radio later merged with Townsquare Media.

Former logo
