= Pines Brook Ridge =

Mountain in New York, United States

- Location within New York Location within the United States

Highest point
- Elevation: 2,100 feet (640 m)
- Coordinates: 42°11′24″N 75°09′43″W

Geography
- Location: Walton, New York, U.S.
- Topo map: USGS Walton West

Pines Brook Ridge is a mountainous ridge line of hills averaging 2,100 (640 m) feet in elevation located in the gradually slopping western extremes of the Catskill Mountains of New York State. The ridge is bounded at its southern end by the west branch of the Delaware River and the village of Walton and runs in a north-northwesterly direction for approximately 5.6 miles to its northern terminus where State Route 206 (Rt 206) bends west at the head of Pines Brook Valley and where a number of small ponds are in close proximity feeding the small Pines Brook. There is no headwall to the valley as the slight elevation changes are gradual and rolling. The ridge-top is heavily forested with a mix of northern hardwoods - Maples; Beech; Oaks; Ash; and Black Cherry. Shrubs, bracken, and wildflowers typical on the ridge are Maidenhair and Ostrich ferns; White Baneberry; Wild Columbine; Jack-in-the-pulpit; White Wood Aster; Golden Aster; Blue Lobelia; Woodland Phlox; Red Chokeberry; Sweetshrub; Red Twig Dogwood; Winterberry Holly; Rhododendron; Arrow Wood, and many others. The ridge's eastern slope, running parallel with Rt 206, is steep, heavily wooded and carpeted with thick underbrush. The western side slopes more gently into the valley of the same name where private properties dominate with a mix of cleared fields, wood lots, abandoned structures, private homes, a number of family businesses, and a small Baptist church. The geographic area, generally, is characterized by narrow V-shaped, north–south valleys separated by these narrow ridges. Snow usually covers the ground from December until April. South of the ridge and across the west branch of the Delaware River Rt 206 climbs up steadily to Bear Spring Mountain (2,518') and a State Wildlife Management Area where there are a number of horse trails, a seasonal state camping ground, and a number of small ponds. To the north the ridge is bounded by Loomis Mountain (2260'). Rt 206 traverses a low saddle between it and the north end of the ridge. Watch for wandering and loitering goats; White Tail Deer; Turkey; Coyotes; and the occasional Fisher crossing roadways. This is New York State's Southern Tier in Delaware County.
