= Colchester Mountain =

Mountain in New York, United States

- Location within New York Location within the United States

Highest point
- Elevation: 2,405 feet (733 m)
- Coordinates: 42°08′39″N 75°02′27″W

Geography
- Location: Walton, New York, U.S.
- Topo map: USGS Walton East

Colchester Mountain is a mountain located in the Catskill Mountains of New York east-southeast of Walton, New York.
