= KELI (FM) =

Coordinates: 31.3671°N 100.0470°W

- San Angelo, Texas; United States
- Broadcast area: San Angelo, Texas
- Frequency: 98.7 MHz
- Branding: 98.7 KISS FM

Programming
- Format: Top 40 (CHR)
- Affiliations: Compass Media Networks; Premiere Networks; Westwood One

Ownership
- Owner: Townsquare Media; (Townsquare License, LLC)
- Sister stations: KGKL, KGKL-FM, KKCN, KNRX

History
- First air date: 1986
- Former call signs: KGLB (1/1986-3/1986, CP)

Technical information
- Licensing authority: FCC
- Facility ID: 18180
- Class: C0
- ERP: 93,000 watts
- HAAT: 393 meters (1,289 ft)

Links
- Public license information: Public file; LMS
- Webcast: Listen Live
- Website: 987kissfmsanangelo.com

KELI (98.7 MHz, "98.7 KISS FM") is an FM radio station that serves the San Angelo, Texas, area with a top 40 (CHR) format. The station is owned by Townsquare Media. It is the local affiliate to The Kidd Kraddick Morning Show.

== History ==
On December 31, 2010, KELI changed their format from adult hits (as "Bob FM") to adult contemporary, branded as "Magic 98.7".

On May 9, 2016, KELI flipped to Hot AC as "i98.7", adding Elvis Duran in mornings.

On July 2, 2018, KELI changed their format from hot AC to top 40/CHR, branded as "98.7 Kiss FM".
