= Loomis Brook =

- Location of the mouth of Loomis Brook

Location
- Country: United States
- State: New York
- County: Delaware

Physical characteristics
- Source: Teed Pond
  - coordinates: 42°14′41″N 75°12′29″W
  - elevation: 2,031 ft (619 m)
- Mouth: Cannonsville Reservoir
  - coordinates: 42°09′20″N 75°17′06″W
  - elevation: 1,148 ft (350 m)

Basin features
- Tributaries
  - left: Windfall Brook

Loomis Brook is a river in Delaware County, New York. It flows into Cannonsville Reservoir northeast of Stilesville.
