= KNRX =

Radio station in Sterling City–San Angelo, Texas

Coordinates: 31.599°N 100.845°W

- Sterling City, Texas; United States
- Broadcast area: San Angelo, Texas
- Frequency: 96.5 MHz
- Branding: 96.5 The Rock

Programming
- Format: Mainstream rock
- Affiliations: Compass Media Networks; Westwood One

Ownership
- Owner: Townsquare Media; (Townsquare License, LLC)
- Sister stations: KELI, KGKL, KGKL-FM, KKCN

History
- First air date: 1998 (as KKCN)
- Former call signs: KAKR (1995–1998); KKCN (1998–1999); KCSE (1999–2005)

Technical information
- Licensing authority: FCC
- Facility ID: 37084
- Class: C2
- ERP: 40,000 watts
- HAAT: 166 meters
- Repeater: 96.5 KNRX-FM1 (San Angelo)

Links
- Public license information: Public file; LMS
- Webcast: Listen Live
- Website: 965therock.com

KNRX (96.5 FM) is a commercial radio station located in Sterling City, Texas, broadcasting to the San Angelo, Texas area. KNRX airs a mainstream rock music format branded as "96.5 The Rock".
