= KXKX =

Coordinates: 38.759°N 93.426°W

- Knob Noster, Missouri; United States
- Broadcast area: Sedalia–Warrensburg, Missouri
- Frequency: 105.7 MHz
- Branding: KIX 105-7

Programming
- Format: Country music
- Affiliations: Compass Media Networks; Westwood One

Ownership
- Owner: Townsquare Media; (Townsquare License, LLC)
- Sister stations: KSDL, KSIS

History
- First air date: 1982; 44 years ago
- Former call signs: KLUK (1982–1987); KSAF (1987–1990)
- Call sign meaning: Redundant Kix

Technical information
- Licensing authority: FCC
- Facility ID: 5204
- Class: C2
- ERP: 38,000 watts
- HAAT: 136 meters

Links
- Public license information: Public file; LMS
- Webcast: Listen Live
- Website: kxkx.com

KXKX (105.7 FM) is a radio station located in Knob Noster, Missouri, in the United States. The station is popularly known as KIX 105-7.
