= KKCN =

Coordinates: 31.663°N 100.091°W

- Ballinger, Texas; United States
- Broadcast area: San Angelo, Texas
- Frequency: 103.1 MHz
- Branding: Kickin' Country 103.1

Programming
- Format: Country

Ownership
- Owner: Townsquare Media; (Townsquare License, LLC)
- Sister stations: KELI, KGKL, KGKL-FM, KNRX

History
- First air date: August 1977 (as KCWB)
- Former call signs: KCWB (1977–1980); KRUN-FM (1980–1996); KCSE (1996–1999)
- Call sign meaning: KicKin' CouNtry

Technical information
- Licensing authority: FCC
- Facility ID: 10024
- Class: C1
- ERP: 100,000 watts
- HAAT: 143.6 meters
- Repeater: 103.1 KKCN-FM1 (San Angelo)

Links
- Public license information: Public file; LMS
- Webcast: Listen Live
- Website: 103kkcn.com

KKCN (103.1 FM, "Kickin' Country 103.1") is a radio station that serves the San Angelo, Texas, area with Texas/Red Dirt Country music. The station is owned by Townsquare Media. The station's studio is located on South Abe Street, south of downtown San Angelo, and the transmitter is northeast of Miles in southwestern Runnels County.

== History ==
The Central West Broadcasting company put KCWB on air in 1977. The callsign changed to KRUN-FM on May 18, 1980, to KCSE in 1996, and to the current KKCN in 1999.
