= WKXZ =

Radio station in Norwich, New York

Simulcasting WNBF Binghamton
- Norwich, New York; United States
- Broadcast area: Oneonta, New York
- Frequency: 93.9 MHz
- Branding: News Radio 93.9

Programming
- Format: News/talk
- Affiliations: Westwood One

Ownership
- Owner: Townsquare License, LLC
- Sister stations: WBKT; WDLA; WDLA-FM; WSRK; WZOZ

History
- First air date: June 3, 1961
- Former call signs: WCHN-FM (1961–1983)

Technical information
- Licensing authority: FCC
- Facility ID: 13824
- Class: B
- ERP: 26,000 watts
- HAAT: 206 meters (676 ft)
- Transmitter coordinates: 42°32′51″N 75°27′9″W
- Translators: 94.3 W232AT (Norwich); 94.3 W232AS (Oneonta)

Links
- Public license information: Public file; LMS
- Webcast: Listen live
- Website: www.wnbf.com

WKXZ (93.9 FM) is a radio station licensed to Norwich, New York, and owned by Townsquare Media. The station broadcasts a news/talk format, simulcasting WNBF from Binghamton.

The station broadcasts with an effective radiated power (ERP) of 26,000 watts, making it a class B station. The transmitter is off New York State Highway 23 and is 206 meters high.

== History ==
Logo as "Star 93.9"

The station went on the air as a class A FM station with the call letters WCHN-FM in 1961. It was initially transmitting from the WCHN (970 AM) tower and only had an ERP of 3,000 watts. In 1983, the station was upgraded to a class B FM station and changed its call sign to the current WKXZ. It moved to a new transmitter site at the former AT&T microwave tower on Tanner Hill, off New York State Route 23. Concurrent with the move, the station increased power from 3,000 watts ERP to 26,000 watts ERP.

On June 17, 2025, WKXZ changed its format from hot adult contemporary to a simulcast of news/talk-formatted WNBF from Binghamton. The move followed the gradual closure of a Townsquare-owned three-station network in the Norwich and Oneonta areas–WCHN, WDOS, and WDLA–that featured entirely-syndicated lineups and did not include WNBF's local programming. WKXZ breaks from the WNBF simulcast during Binghamton Rumble Ponies games, which are only carried on WNBF.

=== Translators ===
Broadcast translators for WKXZ
Call sign	Frequency	City of license	FID	ERP (W)	HAAT	Class	FCC info
W232AT	94.3 FM	Norwich, New York	13825	7	67.1 m (220 ft)	D	LMS
W232AS	94.3 FM	Oneonta, NY	79260	8	47.8 m (157 ft)	D	LMS
