= KSDL =

Radio station in Sedalia, Missouri

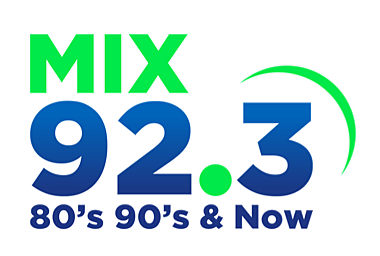
- Sedalia, Missouri; United States
- Broadcast area: Sedalia, Missouri
- Frequency: 92.3 MHz
- Branding: Mix 92.3

Programming
- Format: Adult contemporary

Ownership
- Owner: Townsquare Media; (Townsquare License, LLC)
- Sister stations: KSIS, KXKX

History
- First air date: 1964; 62 years ago (as KCBW)
- Former call signs: KCBW (1964–1992)
- Call sign meaning: Sedalia

Technical information
- Licensing authority: FCC
- Facility ID: 5206
- Class: A
- ERP: 6,000 watts
- HAAT: 89 meters (292 feet)
- Transmitter coordinates: 38°44′03″N 93°13′31″W

Links
- Public license information: Public file; LMS
- Webcast: Listen Live
- Website: mymix923.com

KSDL (92.3 FM) is a radio station licensed to serve Sedalia, Missouri, United States. The station is owned by Townsquare Media and the license is held by Townsquare License, LLC. It Flips to Christmas music on November And December. On November 17th at 3pm KSDL dropped the Awesome 92.3 moniker and began stunting with Christmas music as Santa 92.3. At 12:01am on December 26, 2023, KSDL changed to an AC station branded as Mix 92.3. With the change KSDL added The Anna and Raven show in the morning and the John Tesh Radio Show in the evening. The station now uses local talent for Middays and afternoons.

The station operates at 6,000 watts Effective radiated power (ERP), making it a class A station. The studios are off South Limit Avenue in Sedalia, with the transmitter being off Highway 65.

== History ==
In November 1986, Yates Broadcasting Co., Inc., reached an agreement to sell KCBW to Bick Broadcasting Company. The deal was approved by the FCC on December 9, 1986, and the transaction was consummated on December 30, 1986.

After running a Top 40 music format for much of the 1970s and early-1980s, the station flipped its format to adult contemporary in 1987.

The station was assigned new call letters KSDL by the Federal Communications Commission on August 10, 1992.

In May 2006, Bick Broadcasting Company reached an agreement to sell this station to Double O Radio holding company Double O Missouri Corporation. The deal was approved by the FCC on June 30, 2006, and the transaction was consummated on August 31, 2006. Double O Radio later merged with Townsquare Media.

On March 28, 2019, the station rebranded from Bob FM to Awesome 92.3.

At 3pm on November 17, 2023, "Awesome 92.3" dropped the classic hits format and branding to become Santa 92.3. On December 21, 2023, it was announced that KSDL will flip back to adult contemporary after the Christmas season, branding as "Mix 92.3".
