= WCOH (FM) =

- DuBois, Pennsylvania; United States
- Frequency: 107.3 MHz

Programming
- Format: Christian radio
- Network: Family Life Network

Ownership
- Owner: Family Life Ministries

History
- First air date: November 12, 1975
- Former call signs: WDBA (1975–2009); WCOH-FM (2009–2021)
- Call sign meaning: "Where Christ Offers Hope"

Technical information
- Licensing authority: FCC
- Facility ID: 17613
- Class: B
- ERP: 50,000 watts
- HAAT: 152 meters (499 ft)
- Transmitter coordinates: 41°11′28″N 78°41′27″W
- Translators: 88.3 W202CK (Butler); 103.7 W279AB (Clearfield)

Links
- Public license information: Public file; LMS
- Website: familylife.org

WCOH (107.3 MHz) is an American FM radio station, licensed to DuBois, Pennsylvania. Located in Clearfield County, this station broadcasts with an effective radiated power of 50,000 watts.

It first began broadcasting in 1975 under the call sign WDBA, a call sign that remained in place until April 2009. The station is currently owned by Family Life Ministries.

== History ==
The groundwork for WCOH actually was laid in the early 1970s, when it signed on the air as WDBA (for DuBois Area). A group of ten committed Christians explored the idea of starting up a Christian-formatted radio station in West Central Pennsylvania, as there was no such radio station at the time locally that offered full-time Christian programming. This board was the initial group of investors that successfully applied for a license to operate at 107.3 MHz.

The station first signed on the air November 12, 1975, with the longtime WDBA call sign, and for a period of about three years, it operated for eighteen hours a day, signing on at 6 a.m. and leaving the air at midnight. It was the mission of the station to serve as many Christians as possible, and one of WDBA's challenges as the station grew in popularity was that it could not be heard everywhere within its targeted signal reach.

This changed in 1978 when the group, known by this time as DuBois Area Broadcasting Company, Inc., successfully applied for a translator station which allowed WDBA to extend its signal to the more populous city of Altoona at 102.3 MHz. The translator was necessary because of the mountainous terrain that separated Altoona from eastern Clearfield County, which substantially weakened WDBA's reach. WDBA also extended its broadcast hours to a twenty-four-hour day with the addition of the translator.

The rough terrain also weakened WDBA's signal within the confines of its own county. To alleviate this, another translator was installed in the county seat of Clearfield, operating at 103.7 MHz. This translator signed on in 1994.

=== Station silenced ===
On August 8, 2005, WDBA suddenly went off the air at 10 a.m. Engineers found that the trunk tower feeder line that ran the audio signal from the transmitter to the tower in Sandy Township had been destroyed by an apparent vandal, who damaged the line with a series of shotgun blasts. Though the gunshots alone weren't successful in taking WDBA off the air at that point, enough damage was done to allow water to seep into the line over a period of time and short the line out. The shots were believed to have been fired into the line sometime before June 2.

WDBA remained off the air for eighteen days while the line was replaced. The special line had to be physically built by a cable company in order to meet FCC RF leakage limit standards. The station finally returned to the air at 5:45 p.m. on Friday, August 26. No arrests were made in connection with the vandalism.

=== Family Life Network transition ===
WDBA logo used until April 2009

WDBA ended more than three decades of local ownership on June 26, 2007, when DuBois Area Broadcasting Company entered into an agreement to transfer control of WDBA to Family Life Ministries of Bath, New York. Another application was filed two days later for consent to transfer control of the license of WDBA to Family Life Ministries from DuBois Area Broadcasting Company.

According to the Federal Communications Commission (FCC) website, the transaction was completed for $1.5 million . In November 2007, Family Life Ministries applied to the FCC for redesignation of WDBA's frequency from commercial to non-commercial educational use. Following this application, another was subsequently filed to relieve WDBA of its main studio rule, which would allow the point of program origination from DuBois to its flagship station, WCIK in Bath, New York, effectively shutting down WDBA's local studio and office operations at 28 West Scribner Avenue in DuBois, and furloughing the staff of about a dozen employees.

On April 6, 2009, the station changed its long-time call sign to WCOH-FM, which stands for "Where Christ Offers Hope". All of Family Life Network’s call signs for their stations are acronyms unto the Lord. The suffix was dropped on August 27, 2021.

When Family Life Network purchased WDBA in 2007, the Altoona translator was signed off the air. Then on October 7, 2010, with the generous support of listeners and an agreement between Family Life Network and Radio Partners, LLP, the station signed back on the air at 93.5 WHPA. The call sign was then changed on February 15, 2011 to WCGJ.
