= WUDE =

Coordinates: 34.001°N 81.035°W

- Forest Acres, South Carolina; United States
- Broadcast area: Columbia metropolitan area
- Frequency: 94.3 MHz
- Branding: 94.3 The Dude

Programming
- Format: Country

Ownership
- Owner: Midlands Media Group LLC
- Sister stations: WZMJ

History
- First air date: 2004
- Former call signs: WEHA (2004); WWNQ (2004–2021)
- Call sign meaning: "Dude"

Technical information
- Licensing authority: FCC
- Facility ID: 83396
- Class: A
- ERP: 2,550 watts
- HAAT: 135.9 meters (446 ft)

Links
- Public license information: Public file; LMS
- Webcast: Listen live
- Website: 943thedude.com

WUDE (94.3 MHz) is a commercial FM radio station licensed to Forest Acres, South Carolina, and serving the Columbia metropolitan area. Owned by Midlands Media Group LLC, the station broadcasts a country music radio format branded as "94.3 The Dude". It concentrates on country hits from the 1980s until today.

The studios are on Main Street in Columbia, near the state capitol building. WUDE broadcasts from atop the South Trust Tower. WUDE is a Class A FM station with an effective radiated power (ERP) of 2,550 watts. By contrast, country music rival 97.5 WCOS-FM is powered at 100,000 watts.

== History ==
=== Early years ===
The 94.3 frequency was allocated to Forest Acres by the Federal Communications Commission in the fall of 1996. In order to make way for the new station, WPUB, located in nearby Camden, South Carolina, changed its frequency from 94.3 MHz to 102.7 MHz in 1998.

After several years of planning and delays, WWNQ finally signed on under test authority in the fall of 2004. It initially played a mix of songs from different genes of music in order to not tip off other stations in the market the true format for the new station. After testing was completed, the station signed on in November with a classic country format.

The classic country sound lasted until late November 2008, when it was abruptly dropped for an all-Christmas format. The all-Christmas format had not been done since former adult contemporary station WLTY flipped its format to adult hits.

=== Classic hits ===
On December 30, 2008, after stunting with full-length movies, the station flipped to classic hits as "Flashback 94.3". The first song was "Let the Good Times Roll" by The Cars. Artists included Billy Joel, Queen, The Beatles, Tom Petty, and Electric Light Orchestra.

On July 30, 2010, WWNQ rebranded as "94.3 The River", taking the station off the satellite and programmed locally, playing the top 40 hits of the rock era. Local on-air personalities were Mike Lockaby mornings, Lona Steele middays and Marty Hall afternoons. WWNQ promoted "Columbia's Most-Music Mornings" weekday mornings with 94 minutes of commercial-free Classic Hits. WWNQ also featured a locally produced Beatles specialty program, "The Beatles Radio Magazine," hosted by Marty Hall Sunday mornings at 10 a.m.

=== Classic country ===
On June 28, 2011, at 3 pm, WWNQ began stunting with a ticking clock. On June 29, 2011, at 6 am, WWNQ changed its format to contemporary hit radio, branded as "Q94.3". The contemporary format turned out to be a stunt: at 6 pm on June 30, WWNQ resumed stunting with a ticking clock. The new format was actually classic country, branded as "Country Legends 94.3." The switch took place at 12 noon on Friday, July 1, 2011.

=== Ownership changes ===
In 2012, Hometown Columbia bought WWNQ and WWNU from Double O Radio. Minor changes were planned, but Kirk Litton of Hometown Columbia said Carolina Country would play "The Hall of Fame legends" instead of "bubblegum country". The focus would be the 1980s and 1990s. Also, "Good Morning Columbia", hosted by Doug Enlow, Bill Benton and Charlie Benton, moved from WWNU July 5; the show moved from WISW earlier in the year. WWNQ began airing Sprint Cup Series races as well.

In early 2013, the station began to stunt again as 94.3 George, 94.3 Kenny and 94.3 Garth Brooks, before re-branding as 94.3 The Dude on February 7, 2013, with no change in format.

On March 31, 2016, Hometown Columbia owner Thomas Davis transferred WWNQ's license to Hometown Columbia's parent company, Davis Media, LLC. Effective August 3, 2016, Davis Media sold the station to Midlands Media Group LLC for $900,000.

The call letters were changed to WUDE on September 15, 2021.
