= Teed Pond =

Lake in Delaware County, New York, United States

- Location of Teed Pond within New York
- Location: Delaware County, New York
- Coordinates: 42°14′46″N 75°12′30″W
- Primary outflows: Loomis Brook
- Basin countries: United States
- Surface area: 6 acres (2.4 ha)
- Surface elevation: 2,031 ft (619 m)
- Settlements: Loomis

Teed Pond is a small lake located north-northeast of the hamlet of Loomis in Delaware County, New York. It drains south via Loomis Brook which flows into the Cannonsville Reservoir.

== See also ==
- List of lakes in New York
