= Family Life Network =

Christian radio network in New York state and Pennsylvania

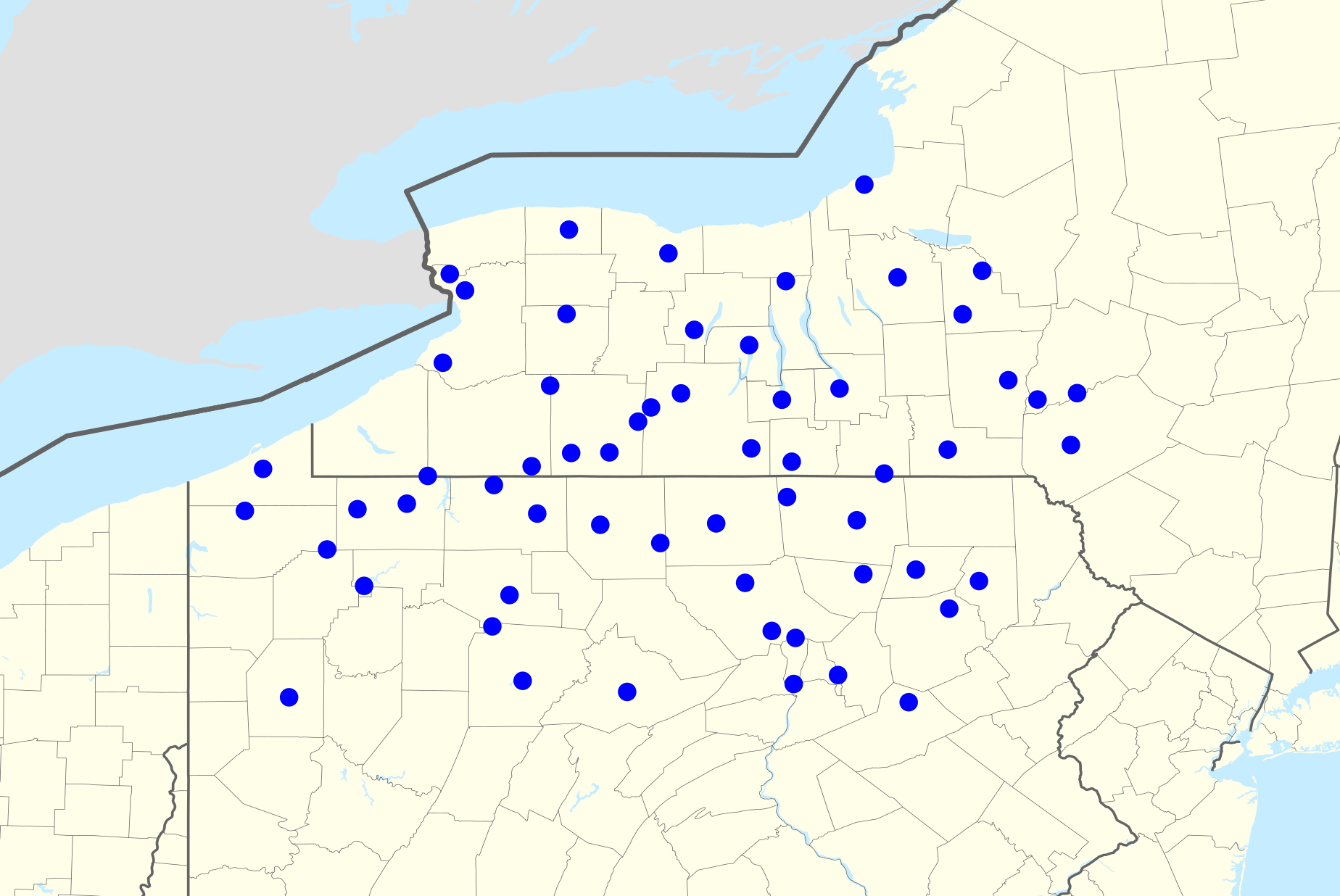
- Type: Radio network
- Country: United States
- Branding: Family Life

Ownership
- Owner: Family Life Ministries, Inc.

Links
- Website: http://www.familylife.org/

The Family Life Network is a Christian radio network, broadcasting on FM stations across Western and Central New York, as well as northern Pennsylvania, from flagship station WCIK (103.1) in Avoca, New York. It is owned and operated by the Family Life Ministries of Bath, New York. FLM is an accredited member of the Evangelical Council for Financial Accountability (ECFA). Family Life is a listener-supported outreach with about 95% of its operating revenue coming directly from listeners, participants, and supporting churches.

The Family Life Network airs a mix of Christian Contemporary music, presented by local DJs, along with Christian talk and teaching programs. National religious leaders heard on the Family Life Network include Jim Daly, Chuck Swindoll, Greg Laurie, Joni Eareckson Tada, David Jeremiah and John MacArthur.

The Family Life Network should not be confused with the unrelated Family Life Radio (also known as Intentional Life Media). Based in Tucson, it is a different chain of Christian radio stations in the South, Southwest and other regions of the U.S.

== History ==
Family Life Ministries was founded in 1957. For most of its first 30 years, FLN operated a single radio station at 103.1 FM in Bath. With the release of Docket 80-90 and the massive expansion of rural and suburban FM radio signals in the late 1980s, Family Life rapidly expanded into a network. It began by acquiring WCID in Friendship, New York (now WCOV).

Family Life actively buys and sells stations and translators in its coverage area, a practice that takes advantage of the ministry's status as a non-commercial religious broadcaster. That means it is not subject to Federal Communications Commission restrictions on the number of stations it can own in one broadcast region. It has largely avoided the AM radio band. When presented with a right of first refusal to buy an AM station in Syracuse, it declined. It quickly spun off two other AM stations in Elmira and Salamanca two months after acquiring them in the wake of Waypoint Media's dissolution.

All of Family Life's stations begin with call signs WCI, WCO, WCG, WCD or WCE. According to the company's station list, these abbreviations stand for Where Christ Is, Where Christ Offers, Where Christ Grants and With Christ Discover. Flagship WCIK, for example, represents "Where Christ Is King".

== Stations and translators by markets ==
=== New York ===
==== Binghamton ====
- WCII - Spencer - 88.5 FM with 17,000 watts.
- WCIJ - Unadilla - 88.9 FM with 5,000 watts.
- WCEB - Deposit - 94.7 FM with 770 watts.
- WCEG - Delhi - 100.3 FM with 1,600 watts.
- WCER - Delhi - 97.5 FM with 6,000 watts.

Translators

Call sign	Frequency	City of license	FID	ERP (W)	Class	FCC info
W275BC	102.9 FM	Chenango Bridge, New York	155934	57	D	LMS
W205CB	88.9 FM	Cayuga Heights, New York	121884	180	D	LMS
W293BE	106.5 FM	Norwich, New York	138951	10	D	LMS
W250BE	97.9 FM	Oneonta, New York	66455	10	D	LMS
W283AT	104.5 FM	Walton, New York	147210	70	D	LMS

==== Buffalo ====
- WCOF - Arcade - 89.5 FM with 1,000 watts.
- WCGP - Silver Creek - 89.3 FM with 8,000 watts.
- WCOU - Attica - 88.3 FM with 11,000 watts.
- WBUF-HD2 - Buffalo - 92.9 FM (owned by Townsquare Media, HD2 channel operated by FLN under a local marketing agreement) with 76,000 watts.

Translators

Call sign	Frequency	City of license	FID	ERP (W)	Class	FCC info
W239BX	95.7 FM	Albion, New York	91358	38	D	LMS
W291CN	106.1 FM	Buffalo, New York	86427	250	D	LMS
W263CN	100.5 FM	Dunkirk, New York	139451	150	D	LMS
W262CQ	100.3 FM	Lockport, New York	91099	250	D	LMS
W239BA	95.7 FM	Niagara Falls, New York	151718	250	D	LMS

==== Elmira ====
- WCDN-FM - Ridgebury, Pennsylvania - 90.3 FM with 4,000 watts.
- WCIG - Big Flats - 97.7 FM with 610 watts.
- WCIH - Elmira - 94.3 FM with 1,200 watts.
- WCIK - Avoca - 103.1 FM with 1,400 watts. (flagship station)
- WCIN - Bath - 88.3 FM with 250 watts; known formerly as WCDV-FM.

Translators

Call sign	Frequency	City of license	FID	ERP (W)	Class	FCC info
W293CE	106.5 FM	Bath, New York	151639	9	D	LMS
W281BA	104.1 FM	Corning, New York	89941	10	D	LMS
W257AX	99.3 FM	Hornell, New York	20652	10	D	LMS
W273BI	88.5 FM	Watkins Glen, New York	139441	50	D	LMS
W230BM	93.9 FM	Wellsboro, Pennsylvania	139304	40	D	LMS

==== Rochester ====
- WCIY - Canandaigua - 88.9 FM with 680 watts.
- WCIP - Clyde - 93.7 FM with 3,800 watts.
- WBZA-HD2 - Rochester - 98.9 FM (owned by Audacy, Inc., HD2 channel operated by FLN under a local marketing agreement)
- WCOM-FM - Kendall - 90.7 FM

Translators

Call sign	Frequency	City of license	FID	ERP (W)	Class	FCC info
W220CJ	91.9 FM	Penn Yan, New York	90738	10	D	LMS
W234AZ	94.7 FM	Rochester, New York	156288	250	D	LMS

==== Syracuse ====
- WCIT-FM - Oneida - 106.3 FM with 1,250 watts.
- WCIS-FM - DeRuyter - 105.1 FM with 33,000 watts.
- WCIO - Oswego - 96.7 FM with 3,400 watts

Translators

Call sign	Frequency	City of license	FID	ERP (W)	Class	FCC info
W252AC	98.3 FM	Fairmount, New York	25016	250	D	LMS

==== Western Twin Tiers ====
- WCGS - Little Valley, New York - 105.9 FM with 7,000 watts.
- WCOV-FM - Friendship, New York - 89.1 FM with 7,000 watts.
- WCGN - Tidioute, Pennsylvania (formerly WCOT Jamestown, New York) - 90.9 FM with 12,000 watts.
- WCOQ – Alfred, New York – 101.9 FM with 1,000 watts.
- WCOP - Eldred, Pennsylvania - 103.9 FM with 1,200 watts.
- WCOR-FM – Lewis Run, Pennsylvania – 96.7 FM with 2,850 watts.
- WCGB-FM – Franklinville, New York – 91.9 FM construction permit (originally issued as WCOI Ellicottville).

Translators

Call sign	Frequency	City of license	FID	ERP (W)	Class	FCC info
W280EB	103.9 FM	Alfred, New York	158291	34	D	LMS
W231AH	94.1 FM	Olean, New York	85146	44	D	LMS
W264AT	100.7 FM	Warren, Pennsylvania	141630	250	D	LMS
W249ED	97.7 FM	Westfield, New York	154509	38	D	LMS

=== Pennsylvania ===
==== Central Pennsylvania ====
- WCOG-FM - Galeton - 100.7 FM with 7,700 watts.
- WCOH - DuBois - 107.3 FM with 18,500 watts.
- WCOA-FM - Johnstown 88.5 FM with 10,000 watts.
- WCOB - State College 88.3 FM with 1800 watts.
- WCOX - Bedford 91.1 FM with 4,000 watts.
- WCDF - Millersburg 98.9 with 780 watts.
- WCDI - Elizabethville 100.5 FM with 1,100 watts.
- WILQ-HD2 - Williamsport - 105.1 FM (owned by Van Michael, HD2 operated by FLN under a local marketing agreement) with 638 watts digital.

Translators

Call sign	Frequency	City of license	FID	ERP (W)	Class	FCC info
W202CK	88.7 FM	Butler, Pennsylvania	147791	13	D	LMS
W279AB	103.7 FM	Clearfield, Pennsylvania	17614	175	D	LMS
W272BO	102.3 FM	Coudersport, Pennsylvania	139263	10	D	LMS
W284BG	104.7 FM	Lewisburg, Pennsylvania	150750	250	D	LMS
W277BJ	103.3 FM	Williamsport, Pennsylvania	156045	250	D	LMS

==== Erie ====
- WCGF - Ellwood City - 92.1 FM with 2,500 watts.
- WCGV - Cambridge Springs - 89.9 FM with 25,000 watts.
- WCGH - Farmington Township - 106.1 FM with 3,200 watts.
- WCGT - Clintonville - 88.7 FM (formerly 89.1 WGIP—Tidioute, acquired from Dove FM in May 2020; further relocations pending)

Translators

Call sign	Frequency	City of license	FID	ERP (W)	Class	FCC info
W254AJ	98.7 FM	Erie, Pennsylvania	78069	250	D	LMS
W238BD	95.5 FM	Titusville, Pennsylvania	138505	10	D	LMS

==== Northeastern Pennsylvania ====
- WCDH - Shenandoah - 91.5 FM with 1,200 watts.
- WCDJ - Tunkhannock - 91.3 FM with 250 watts.
- WCDR - Laporte - 90.9 FM with 250 watts.
- WCDV-FM - Trout Run - 90.1 FM with 350 watts.

Translators

Call sign	Frequency	City of license	FID	ERP (W)	Class	FCC info
W255BL	98.9 FM	Bloomsburg, Pennsylvania	154675	240	D	LMS
W228CH	93.5 FM	Towanda, Pennsylvania	141461	19	D	LMS
