= KGKL-FM =

- San Angelo, Texas; United States
- Broadcast area: San Angelo, Texas
- Frequency: 97.5 MHz
- Branding: 97.5 KGKL

Programming
- Format: Country
- Affiliations: Compass Media Networks; Premiere Networks

Ownership
- Owner: Townsquare Media; (Townsquare License, LLC)
- Sister stations: KELI, KGKL, KKCN, KNRX

Technical information
- Licensing authority: FCC
- Facility ID: 34465
- Class: C1
- ERP: 100,000 watts
- HAAT: 125 meters (410 ft)
- Transmitter coordinates: 31°29′46″N 100°24′50″W

Links
- Public license information: Public file; LMS
- Webcast: Listen Live
- Website: 975kgkl.com

KGKL-FM (97.5 MHz, "97.5 KGKL") is a radio station broadcasting a country music format. Licensed to San Angelo, Texas, United States, the station serves the San Angelo area. The station is currently owned by Townsquare Media.

== History ==
The station changed its call sign from KSJT to KGKL-FM on February 28, 1983. On October 7, 2003, then-owner KGKL, Inc. assigned the station's license to KGKL Partners, LLP, along with the licenses for KELI and KGKL. The licenses for the three stations were assigned again on January 26, 2004, to Encore Broadcasting LLC, and again on February 13, 2004, to Encore Broadcasting of San Angelo, LLC. On November 17, 2005, the three licenses, along with those for KKCN, KKCN-FM1, KNRX, and KNRX-FM1, were assigned to Encore Broadcasting of San Angelo Limited Partnership 1. All seven licenses were assigned to Double O Texas Corporation on January 19, 2006. In August of 2012, the cluster was sold to Townsquare Media Sangelo License LLC.

The station's current air personalities consist of Bobby Bones, Jess On The Job, Taste of Country Nights and is the Dallas Cowboys Affiliate for San Angelo.
