= KGKL (AM) =

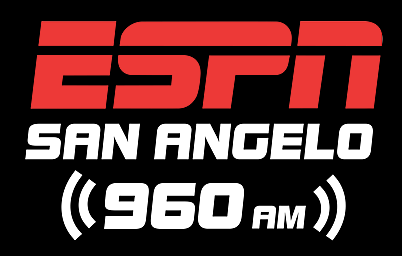
- San Angelo, Texas; United States
- Broadcast area: San Angelo, Texas
- Frequency: 960 kHz
- Branding: ESPN 960

Programming
- Format: Sports
- Affiliations: ESPN Radio; Dallas Cowboys Radio Network; Texas Rangers Radio Network

Ownership
- Owner: Townsquare Media; (Townsquare License, LLC)
- Sister stations: KGKL-FM, KELI (FM), KKCN, KNRX

History
- First air date: December 4, 1928

Technical information
- Licensing authority: FCC
- Facility ID: 34464
- Class: D (Formerly B up to March 2020)
- Power: 5,000 watts day 116 watts night
- Transmitter coordinates: 31°29′40″N 100°24′52″W

Links
- Public license information: Public file; LMS
- Webcast: Listen Live
- Website: espn960sanangelo.com

KGKL (960 AM) is a radio station broadcasting a sports format. Licensed to San Angelo, Texas, United States, the station serves the San Angelo area. The station is currently owned by Townsquare Media and before September 1, 2020; featured programming from Premiere Radio Networks, WestwoodOne, Dave Ramsey, and Compass Media Networks. Bill Lockwood's American Liberty program, based at News/Talk 1290 in Wichita Falls, also aired on News/Talk 960 before the format change to sports. The station was awarded a construction permit on March 9, 2020 to become a Class D station, reducing power at night from 1,000 to 116 watts.

One of the oldest continuous religious programs in Texas airs on KGKL AM, the San Angelo Businessmen & Women's Bible Class has aired every Sunday on KGKL AM since 1929.

In May 2020, Robert Snyder, Regional News/Talk/Sports Director of Content for the Texas Townsquare Media Network, became the operations manager for KGKL (AM).

On September 1, 2020, KGKL changed their format from news/talk to sports, branded as "ESPN 960", with programming from ESPN Radio. Ryan Hyatt's Raiderland featuring Rob Breaux also airs on ESPN 960, it is based at Talk 1340 in Lubbock.

On December 8, 2026 KGKL AM will celebrate its 98th anniversary being the oldest radio station in the Concho Valley.
