= Loomis, Delaware County, New York =

Loomis, New York
- Hamlet
- Location within the state of New York
- Coordinates: 42°12′31″N 75°12′56″W
- Country: United States
- State: New York
- County: Delaware
- Town: Walton
- Elevation: 1,568 ft (478 m)
- Time zone: UTC-5 (Eastern (EST))
  - Summer (DST): UTC-4 (EDT)

Loomis is a hamlet in Delaware County, New York, United States. It is located northwest of Walton at the corner of NY–206 and Loomis Brook Road. Loomis Brook flows southward through the hamlet.
