= WZOZ =

- Oneonta, New York; United States
- Frequency: 103.1 MHz
- Branding: WZOZ 103.1 FM

Programming
- Format: Classic hits
- Affiliations: Compass Media Networks

Ownership
- Owner: Townsquare Media; (Townsquare License, LLC)
- Sister stations: WBKT; WDLA; WDLA-FM; WKXZ; WSRK

History
- First air date: November 28, 1972 (as WIEZ)
- Former call signs: WIEZ (1972–1982)

Technical information
- Licensing authority: FCC
- Facility ID: 66664
- Class: A
- ERP: 2,000 watts
- HAAT: 110 meters (360 ft)
- Transmitter coordinates: 42°25′28″N 75°4′36″W

Links
- Public license information: Public file; LMS
- Webcast: Listen live
- Website: wzozfm.com

WZOZ (103.1 FM) is an American local radio station broadcasting a classic hits format. Licensed to Oneonta, New York, the station is owned by Townsquare Media.
