= WSRK =

- Oneonta, New York; United States
- Frequency: 103.9 MHz
- Branding: Mix 103.9

Programming
- Format: Adult contemporary
- Affiliations: Compass Media Networks

Ownership
- Owner: Townsquare Media; (Townsquare License, LLC)
- Sister stations: WBKT; WDLA; WDLA-FM; WKXZ; WZOZ

History
- First air date: January 26, 1970

Technical information
- Licensing authority: FCC
- Facility ID: 68737
- Class: A
- ERP: 1,400 watts
- HAAT: 180 meters (590 ft)
- Transmitter coordinates: 42°25′26″N 75°02′33″W

Links
- Public license information: Public file; LMS
- Webcast: Listen live
- Website: www.wsrkfm.com

WSRK (103.9 FM) is a radio station broadcasting an adult contemporary format, playing music from the 1980s, 1990s, and today. It is licensed to Oneonta, New York, United States, and is owned by Townsquare Media.
