= WBKT =

Radio station in Norwich, New York

- Norwich, New York; United States
- Broadcast area: Oneonta, New York
- Frequency: 95.3 MHz
- Branding: 95.3 Big Kat

Programming
- Format: Country
- Affiliations: Compass Media Networks

Ownership
- Owner: Townsquare Media; (Townsquare License, LLC)
- Sister stations: WDLA; WDLA-FM; WKXZ; WSRK; WZOZ

History
- First air date: August 29, 1997
- Call sign meaning: "Big Kat"

Technical information
- Licensing authority: FCC
- Facility ID: 73139
- Class: A
- ERP: 470 watts
- HAAT: 256.3 meters (841 ft)
- Transmitter coordinates: 42°26′8″N 75°30′47″W

Links
- Public license information: Public file; LMS
- Webcast: Listen live
- Website: bigcat953.com

WBKT (95.3 FM) is a radio station broadcasting a country format. Licensed to Norwich, New York, United States, the station is owned by Townsquare Media.
