= WDLA (AM) =

Currently silent
- Walton, New York; United States
- Frequency: 1270 kHz

Ownership
- Owner: Townsquare Media; (Townsquare License, LLC)
- Sister stations: WBKT; WDLA-FM; WKXZ; WSRK; WZOZ

History
- First air date: May 30, 1951

Technical information
- Licensing authority: FCC
- Facility ID: 16443
- Class: D
- Power: 5,000 watts (day); 89 watts (night)
- Transmitter coordinates: 42°8′10.3″N 75°4′46.6″W

Links
- Public license information: Public file; LMS

WDLA (1270 AM) is a commercial radio station licensed to Walton, New York, United States, that is currently silent. Owned by Townsquare Media alongside WDLA-FM, it last carried a talk format.

The transmitter is on Radio Station Road off New York State Route 206 in Colchester, New York.

== History ==
WDLA signed on the air on May 30, 1951. It was owned by the Delaware County Broadcasting Corporation.

WDLA was originally a daytimer powered at 1,000 watts but required to go off the air at night. In the 1980s, the station was authorized by the Federal Communications Commission to broadcast at 5,000 watts in the daytime and run with limited power at night.

The station went silent in mid-2025 for economic reasons. Vince Benedetto’s Bold Gold Media Group has offered to buy WDLA and sister station WDLA-FM. Bold Gold owns 15 stations in Upstate New York.
