= WDLA-FM =

Currently silent
- Walton, New York; United States
- Frequency: 92.1 MHz

Ownership
- Owner: Townsquare Media; (Townsquare License, LLC)
- Sister stations: WBKT; WDLA; WKXZ; WSRK; WZOZ

History
- First air date: November 16, 1973

Technical information
- Licensing authority: FCC
- Facility ID: 16444
- Class: A
- ERP: 690 watts
- HAAT: 200 meters (660 ft)
- Transmitter coordinates: 42°8′10.3″N 75°4′46.6″W

Links
- Public license information: Public file; LMS

WDLA-FM (92.1 FM) is a commercial radio station licensed to Walton, New York, United States, that is currently silent. It is owned by Townsquare Media.

The transmitter is on Radio Station Road off New York State Route 206 in Colchester, New York.

== History ==
WDLA-FM signed on the air on November 16, 1973. It was owned by the Delaware County Broadcasting Corporation as the sister station to WDLA 1270 AM. For the first few decades the two stations would simulcast most of their programming since WDLA AM was originally a daytimer station, required to go off the air at night. WDLA-FM 92.1 would continue to broadcast their programming after WDLA signed off. Eventually WDLA-FM separated its programming from the AM station, offering a country music format.

WDLA-AM-FM went silent in mid-2025 for economic reasons. Vince Benedetto’s Bold Gold Media Group has offered to buy WDLA-AM-FM. Bold Gold owns 15 stations in Upstate New York.
