= Walton (town), New York =

Walton, New York
- Town
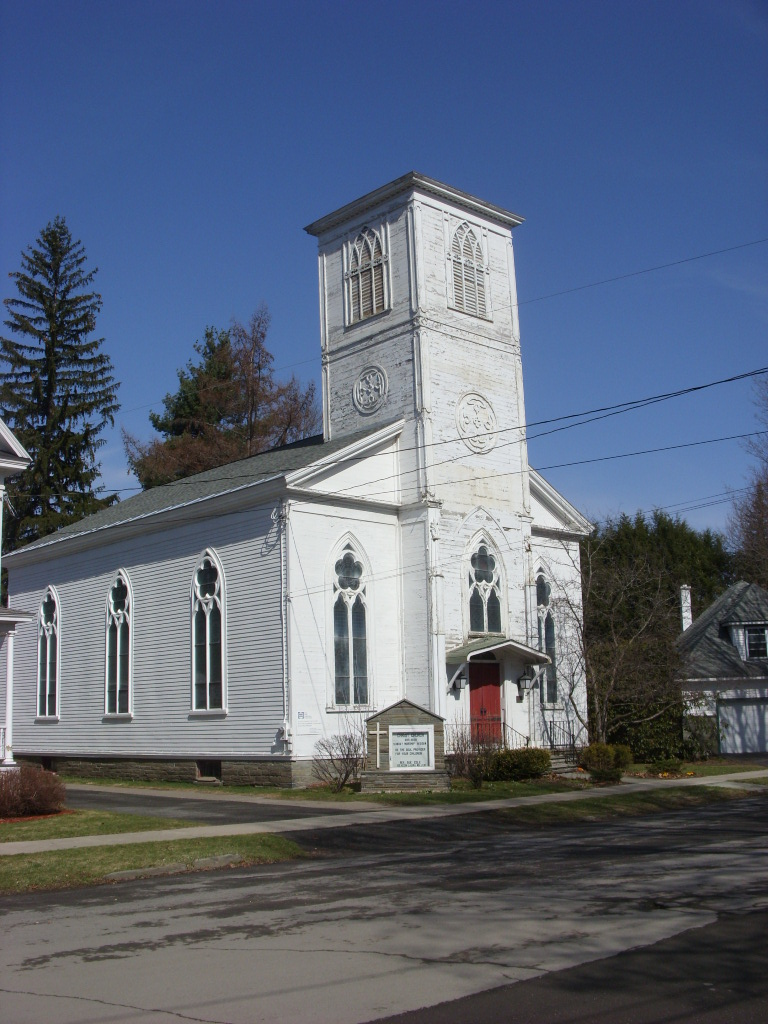
- Christ Episcopal Church in Walton

- Location in the state of New York
- Coordinates: 42°10′11″N 75°07′49″W
- Country: United States
- State: New York
- County: Delaware

Government
  - Type: Town Council
  - Town Supervisor: Joseph M. Cetta (R)
  - Town Council: Members' List: • Kevin Armstrong (R); • Patty Wood (R); • Luis Rodriguez-Betancourt (R); • Leonard Govern (R)

Area
  - Total: 97.62 sq mi (252.83 km^{2})
  - Land: 96.84 sq mi (250.81 km^{2})
  - Water: 0.78 sq mi (2.02 km^{2})
- Elevation: 1,228 ft (374 m)

Population (2020)
  - Total: 5,270
- Time zone: Eastern (EST)
- ZIP Codes: 13856 (Walton); 13756 (East Branch); 13839 (Sidney Center)
- Area code: 607
- FIPS code: 36-025-78047
- GNIS feature ID: 979593
- Website: townofwaltonny.gov

Walton is a town in Delaware County, New York, United States. The population was 5,270 at the 2020 census. The town is in the west-central part of the county and contains the village of Walton. The town claims to be the "Scarecrow Capital of the World."

Walton was formed in 1797 from the town of Franklin. The original settlement, near the site of the village of Walton, occurred in 1785.

George O. Mead's store in Walton in the early 20th century

== Geography ==
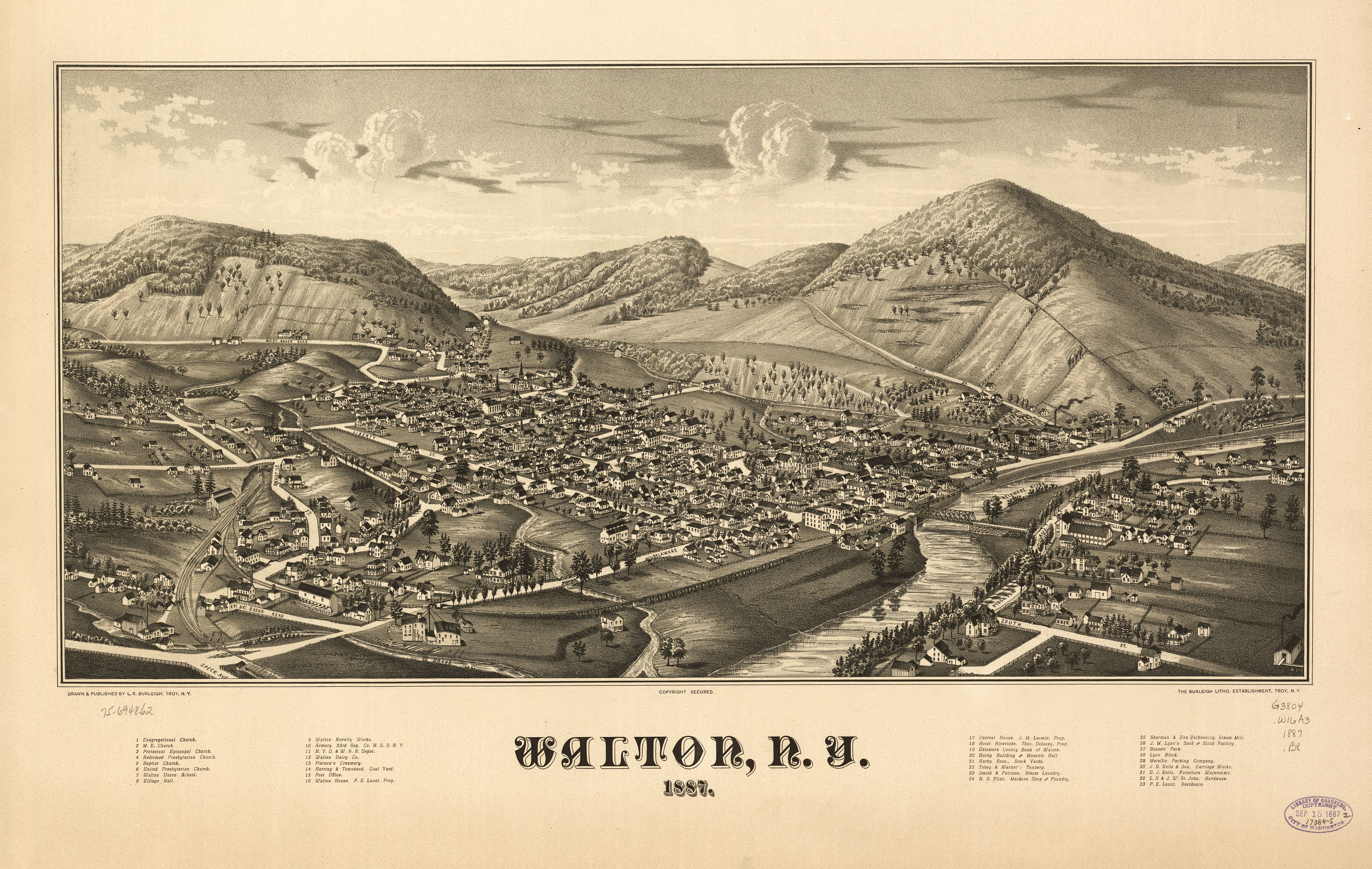
Lithograph of Walton from 1887 by L.R. Burleigh including list of landmarks

Walton is in west-central Delaware County, on both sides of the West Branch Delaware River. According to the United States Census Bureau, the town has a total area of 97.6 square miles (252.8 km^{2}), of which 96.8 square miles (250.8 km^{2}) is land and 0.77 square miles (2.0 km^{2}), or 0.80%, is water.

== Demographics ==
Historical population
Census	Pop.	Note	%±
1820	1,432		—
1830	1,672		16.8%
1840	1,846		10.4%
1850	2,271		23.0%
1860	2,740		20.7%
1870	3,216		17.4%
1880	3,544		10.2%
1890	4,543		28.2%
1900	4,869		7.2%
1910	5,088		4.5%
1920	5,425		6.6%
1930	5,111		−5.8%
1940	5,220		2.1%
1950	5,724		9.7%
1960	5,753		0.5%
1970	5,882		2.2%
1980	5,839		−0.7%
1990	5,953		2.0%
2000	5,607		−5.8%
2010	5,576		−0.6%
2020	5,270		−5.5%
U.S. Decennial Census

As of the census of 2000, there were 5,607 people, 2,391 households, and 1,570 families residing in the town. The population density was 57.7 inhabitants per square mile (22.3/km^{2}). There were 2,958 housing units at an average density of 30.4 per square mile (11.7/km^{2}). The racial makeup of the town was 97.81% White, 0.34% Black or African American, 0.25% Native American, 0.50% Asian, 0.20% from other races, and 0.91% from two or more races. Hispanic or Latino of any race were 1.03% of the population.

There were 2,391 households, of which 28.5% had children under the age of 18 living with them, 50.4% were married couples living together, 11.0% had a female householder with no husband present, and 34.3% were non-families. 29.9% of all households were one person, and 13.7% had someone living alone who was 65 years of age or older. The average household size was 2.33 and the average family size was 2.85.

In the town, the population was spread out, with 23.5% under the age of 18, 6.4% from 18 to 24, 25.7% from 25 to 44, 26.5% from 45 to 64, and 17.9% who were 65 years of age or older. The median age was 42 years. For every 100 females, there were 92.7 males. For every 100 females age 18 and over, there were 88.8 males.

The median income for a household in the town was $30,550, and the median income for a family was $41,464. Men had a median income of $27,463; women, $20,000. The per capita income for the town was $16,779. About 9.0% of families and 12.1% of the population were below the poverty line, including 14.7% of those under age 18 and 8.6% of those age 65 or over.

== Notable people ==
- Hobart M. Cable, Massachusetts legislator and pianomaker.
- Jeri Laber, a founder of Human Rights Watch.
- Everett De Morier, humorist, author, and novelist.
- William B. Ogden (1805-1877), served as the first mayor of Chicago from 1837-1838.
- Jim Rice, Tennessee Titans Executive

Elected officials for the town of Walton:

Supervisor

- Joseph M. Cetta

Town Clerk/Tax Collector Registrar of Vital Statistics

- Ronda Williams

Town Board:

- Kevin Armstrong
- Len Govern
- Patty Wood
- Luis Rodriguez

== Communities and locations in the Town of Walton ==
- Bear Spring Mountain – An elevation located south of the village of Walton.
- Beerston – A hamlet located south-southwest of Walton.
- Colchester Mountain – An elevation located northeast of Starkweather Hill.
- Dunk Hill – An elevation located north-northeast of the village of Walton.
- Houck Mountain – An elevation located south of Bear Spring Mountain.
- Launt Pond – A small lake located south of Mount Holly.
- Loomis – A hamlet located northwest of Walton.
- Loomis Mountain – An elevation located northeast of Loomis.
- Mount Holly – An elevation located east-southeast of the village of Walton.
- Northfield – A hamlet located north-northwest of Walton.
- Oak Ridge Pond – A small lake located west-northwest of Russ Gray Pond.
- Pine Hill – An elevation located east-northeast of the village of Walton.
- Pines Brook Ridge – A ridge located northwest of the village of Walton.
- Pinesville – A hamlet located west-southwest of Walton.
- Russ Gray Pond – A small lake located west of Launt Pond.
- South Mountain – An elevation located south of the village of Walton.
- Starkweather Hill – An elevation located southeast of Mount Holly.
- Teed Pond – A small lake located west of Northfield.
- Walton – The Village of Walton. Located in the center part of the town on the West Branch Delaware River.
- Walton Mountain – An elevation located west of the village of Walton.
